= 2011 European Trophy =

Tournament details
- Venue(s): 42 (in 39 host cities)
- Dates: 11 August – 18 December
- Teams: 24

Tournament statistics
- Games played: 108
- Goals scored: 600 (5.56 per game)
- Attendance: 237,496 (2,199 per game)
- Scoring leader(s): (Finland) Ilari Filppula (16 points)

The 2011 European Trophy was the second European Trophy, a European ice hockey tournament held annually. It was also the sixth tournament since its predecessor, the Nordic Trophy, was launched in 2006. The regulation round began on 11 August 2011 and ended on 6 September 2011. The playoffs, which took place in Austria, were played 16–18 December 2011 in the Eisarena Salzburg in Salzburg, and the Albert Schultz Eishalle in Vienna, at the same time as the 2011 Channel One Cup. The playoff hosts, Red Bull Salzburg, won the playoffs and captured their first championship title in the European Trophy tournament, having lost in the quarterfinals last year.

A significant difference in this year's tournament was that the number of participating teams was increased from 18 to 24. To compensate this, the teams were divided into four divisions this year, instead of just two in the previous year's tournament. Another difference was that the playoffs, known as the Red Bulls Salute, were not played at the same time as the regulation round—the regulation round was played between August–September 2011, while the playoffs were played in December, three months later. Further, the junior edition was disbanded prior to this year's tournament.

== Tournament format ==
The 24 teams in the tournament were, based on geographical location, divided into four divisions: the West Division, the North Division, the South Division, and the East Division. Each division consisted of 6 teams who played a round-robin in their division, and another three games against teams from the other three divisions (see the Division vs. Division games section), giving a total of 8 games per team. The top two teams of each division qualified for the playoffs, but as Red Bull Salzburg qualified for the playoffs as hosts (i.e. failed to reach one of the top two spots of the East Division), they replaced the worst second ranked team out of all four divisions, which was Eisbären Berlin.

Had at least two teams in the same division ended up tied in points, the following tie-breaker format was used:

1. Best goal difference
2. Most goals scored in total
3. Results in games against the tied teams
4. Drawing of lots

As Red Bull Salzburg, who were automatically qualified for the playoffs, failed to reach one of the top two spots of the East Division, the same tie-breaker format was used to determine which second ranked team they would replace, which was Eisbären Berlin.

== Participating clubs ==
2011 European Trophy teams (Divisions:: South,: North,: West,: East)

Division	Team	City	Home arena	Capacity	Joined NT/ET
North	Djurgårdens IF	(Sweden) Stockholm	Hovet	8,094	2006
North	HIFK	(Finland) Helsinki	Helsinki Ice Hall	8,200	2006
North	Jokerit	(Finland) Helsinki	Hartwall Areena	13,349	2008
North	Sparta Praha	(Czech Republic) Prague	Tesla Arena	16,995	2010
North	Slavia Praha	(Czech Republic) Prague	O2 Arena	18,000	2011
North	Luleå HF	(Sweden) Luleå	Coop Norrbotten Arena	6,200	2011
South	Linköpings HC	(Sweden) Linköping	Cloetta Center	8,500	2006
South	HV71	(Sweden) Jönköping	Kinnarps Arena	7,038	2008
South	Adler Mannheim	(Germany) Mannheim	SAP Arena	10,600	2010
South	Bílí Tygři Liberec	(Czech Republic) Liberec	Tipsport Arena	7,500	2011
South	ČSOB Pojišťovna Pardubice	(Czech Republic) Pardubice	ČEZ Aréna	10,194	2011
South	Kometa Brno	(Czech Republic) Brno	Hala Rondo	7,200	2011
East	Oulun Kärpät	(Finland) Oulu	Oulun Energia Areena	6,614	2006
East	KalPa	(Finland) Kuopio	Kuopion Jäähalli	5,225	2011
East	Mountfield České Budějovice	(Czech Republic) České Budějovice	Budvar Arena	6,421	2011
East	Plzeň 1929	(Czech Republic) Plzeň	ČEZ Aréna	8,420	2011
East	Slovan Bratislava	(Slovakia) Bratislava	Slovnaft Arena	10,000	2011
East	Vienna Capitals	(Austria) Vienna	Albert Schultz Eishalle	4,500	2011
West	Färjestad BK	(Sweden) Karlstad	Löfbergs Lila Arena	8,647	2006
West	Frölunda Indians	(Sweden) Gothenburg	Scandinavium	12,044	2006
West	TPS	(Finland) Turku	HK Arena	11,820	2006
West	Tappara	(Finland) Tampere	Hakametsä Areena	7,800	2006
West	Eisbären Berlin	(Germany) Berlin	O2 World	14,200	2010
West	Red Bull Salzburg	(Austria) Salzburg	Eisarena Salzburg	3,200	2010

== Regulation round ==
Team is qualified for the playoffs
Team is eliminated from the tournament

=== West Division ===
Team	GP	W	OTW	OTL	L	GF	GA	DIF	PTS
(Sweden) Frölunda Indians	8	5	1	1	1	32	19	+13	18
(Germany) Eisbären Berlin	8	4	0	1	3	18	26	–8	13
(Austria) Red Bull Salzburg	8	4	0	0	4	27	25	+2	12
(Finland) TPS	8	2	2	1	3	19	20	–1	11
(Sweden) Färjestads BK	8	2	1	2	3	15	22	–7	10
(Finland) Tappara	8	1	0	2	5	21	28	–7	5

All times for the games played in Finland are UTC+3, while all times for the other games are UTC+2.

11 August 2011; 19:00	Frölunda Indians (Sweden)	6–0 (2–0, 2–0, 2–0)	(Germany) Eisbären Berlin	Frölunda Campus, Gothenburg; Attendance: 2,187

Game reference

Linus Fernström
Goalies
Rob Zepp
Referees:
(Sweden) Morgan Johansson
(Sweden) Patrik Sjöberg

P-J. Axelsson (D. Umicevic, F. Eriksson) (PP) – 04:06	1–0
M. Kahnberg (J. Lundqvist) – 13:40	2–0
F. Pettersson (M. Pyörälä, M. Olimb) – 27:10	3–0
P. Johnsson (M. Pyörälä, M. Olimb) – 30:02	4–0
T. Koivisto (M. Kahnberg) – 43:57	5–0
M. Pyörälä (M. Olimb, P. Gunten) (PP) – 59:36	6–0

8 min
Penalties
32 min
36
Shots
27

11 August 2011; 19:00	Färjestad BK (Sweden)	0–4 (0–1, 0–0, 0–3)	(Austria) Red Bull Salzburg	Björkhallen, Kristinehamn; Attendance: 1,014

Game reference

Fredrik Pettersson-Wentzel
Goalies
Josh Tordjman
Referees:
(Sweden) Wolmer Edqvist
(Sweden) Mikael Nord

0–1	16:24 – R. Abid (B. Aubin)
0–2	47:13 – D. Heinrich (C. Lawrence, D. Lynch)
0–3	52:07 – (ENG) M. Latusa (R. Abid, D. Bois)
0–4	59:50 – M. Pöck (M. Schiechl, T. Raffl)

8 min
Penalties
14 min
37
Shots
22

13 August 2011; 16:00	Frölunda Indians (Sweden)	3–2 (1–1, 0–1, 2–0)	(Austria) Red Bull Salzburg	Frölunda Campus, Gothenburg; Attendance: 2,471

Game reference

Fredrik Andersen
Goalies
Josh Tordjman
Referees:
(Sweden) Morgan Johansson
(Sweden) Patrik Sjöberg

J. Tolsa (J. Lundqvist, M. Kahnberg) – 07:52	1–0
	1–1	10:03 – S. Regier (D. Bois, D. Lynch)
	1–2	23:19 – D. Bois (M. Schlacher)
F. Eriksson (H. Tömmernes) – 41:51	2–2
M. Pyörälä (F. Pettersson) (PP) – 49:19	3–2

12 min
Penalties
22 min
28
Shots
32

13 August 2011; 19:00	Färjestad BK (Sweden)	4–3 OT (2–1, 1–1, 0–1) (OT: 1–0)	(Germany) Eisbären Berlin	Löfbergs Lila Arena, Karlstad; Attendance: 2,687

Game reference

Fredrik Pettersson-Wentzel
Goalies
Kevin Nastiuk
Referees:
(Sweden) Mikael Sjökvist
(Sweden) Mikael Nord

	0–1	00:29 – D. Olver (J. Sharrow)
C. Berglund (P. Åslund, O. Klefbom) – 06:34	1–1
R. Sterner (J. Hillding, P. Wennerström) – 09:37	2–1
	2–2	24:52 – (SH) T. J. Mulock (D. Weiss)
S. Lindström (J. Hillding) – 26:21	3–2
	3–3	50:23 – J. Talbot (J. Baxmann, M. Christensen)
M. Nygren (A. Grundel, R. Walin) (PP) – 61:46	4–3

16 min
Penalties
23 min
35
Shots
24

18 August 2011; 18:30	Tappara (Finland)	3–4 GWS (0–1, 1–2, 2–0) (OT: 0–0) (SO: 0–1)	(Sweden) Frölunda Indians	Hakametsä Areena, Tampere; Attendance: 3,010

Game reference

Jani Nieminen
Goalies
Magnus Hellberg
Referees:
(Finland) Timo Favorin
(Finland) Jari Leppäalho

	0–1	16:05 – J. Lundqvist (M. Kahnberg, J. Tolsa)
	0–2	23:22 – N. Lasu (M. Johansson, T. Koivisto)
	0–3	29:38 – (PP) M. Kahnberg (J. Lundqvist, R. Lindqvist)
N. Lähde (J. Leimu, P. Saravo) – 33:47	1–3
J-M. Järvinen (P. Saravo, K. Kaijomaa) (PP) – 44:07	2–3
J. Tenute (P. Saravo) (SH) – 52:29	3–3

J. Tenute
S. Venäläinen
J. Leimu
K. Strömberg
Shootout
M. Kahnberg
D. Umicevic
M. Olimb
P-J. Axelsson
10 min
Penalties
10 min
26
Shots
37

18 August 2011; 18:30	TPS (Finland)	2–1 OT (1–0, 0–1, 0–0) (OT: 1–0)	(Sweden) Färjestad BK	HK Arena, Turku; Attendance: 2,309

Game reference

Marek Schwarz
Goalies
Cristopher Nihlstorp
Referees:
(Finland) Stefan Fonselius
(Finland) Antti Orelma

T. Plíhal (M. Birner, T. Mojžíš) (PP) – 18:01	1–0
	1–1	28:01 – (PP) E. Thorell (P. Lundh)
T. Plíhal (G. Raboin, T. Laakso) (PP) – 63:17	2–1

12 min
Penalties
10 min
29
Shots
21

19 August 2011; 19:30	Eisbären Berlin (Germany)	0–5 (0–2, 0–2, 0–1)	(Austria) Red Bull Salzburg	O2 World, Berlin; Attendance: 8,900

Game reference

Rob Zepp
Goalies
Josh Tordjman
Referees:
(Germany) Richard Schütz
(Germany) Jens Steinecke

0–1	12:13 – J. Williams (R. Earl, M. Schlacher)
0–2	12:50 – M. Trattnig (M. Schiechl, M. Schlacher)
0–3	22:01 – D. Erlich (M. Latusa, D. Heinrich)
0–4	33:14 – (PP) D. Heinrich (T. Raffl, R. Abid)
0–5	52:29 – D. Erlich (C. Lawrence, M. Trattnig)

28 min
Penalties
49 min
24
Shots
25

20 August 2011; 17:00	Tappara (Finland)	2–4 (1–1, 0–2, 1–1)	(Sweden) Färjestad BK	Hakametsä Areena, Tampere; Attendance: 2,810

Game reference

Juha Metsola
Goalies
Fredrik Pettersson-Wentzel
Referees:
(Finland) Jussi Leppänen
(Finland) Tero Toivola

J-M. Järvinen (J. Peltola) – 02:31	1–0
	1–1	15:07 – M. Paulsson (M. Johansson, E. Thorell)
	1–2	22:13 – M. Holtet
	1–3	30:59 – R. Sterner (P. Wennerström, K. Berglund)
J-M. Järvinen (A. Elorinne, J. Peltola) – 45:17	2–3
	2–4	45:43 – R. Sterner (M. Nygren)

16 min
Penalties
10 min
33
Shots
29

20 August 2011; 17:00	TPS (Finland)	3–2 GWS (0–0, 1–1, 1–1) (OT: 0–0) (SO: 1–0)	(Sweden) Frölunda Indians	HK Arena, Turku; Attendance: 2,465

Game reference

Aleksis Ahlqvist
Goalies
Frederik Andersen
Referees:
(Finland) Jari Levonen
(Finland) Antti Boman

	0–1	24:47 – (SH) P-J. Axelsson
T. Plíhal (J. Tuominen, M. Birner) (PP) – 39:25	1–1
M. Anttila (T. Suominen, V. Vahalahti) – 50:30	2–1
	2–2	57:23 – H. Tömmernes (J. Tolsa, J. Lundqvist)

T. Plíhal
M. Virtala (miss)
M. Birner
Shootout
M. Kahnberg
(miss) J. Sundström
P-J. Axelsson
10 min
Penalties
14 min
28
Shots
26

25 August 2011; 19:15	Red Bull Salzburg (Austria)	3–8 (2–2, 1–3, 0–3)	(Finland) Tappara	Eisarena Salzburg, Salzburg; Attendance: 1,276

Game reference

Josh Tordjman
Goalies
Juha Metsola
Referees:
(Austria) Georg Veit
(Austria) Wolfgang Fussi

S. Regier (D. Bois, R. Earl) – 06:32	1–0
M. Latusa (R. Abid, T. Raffl) (PP) – 12:38	2–0
	2–1	17:57 – (EV) S. Venäläinen (J. Makkonen)
	2–2	24:14 – K. Strömberg (J. Makkonen, T. Mäntylä)
	2–3	26:25 – (PP) S. Venäläinen (K. Strömberg, J. Makkonen)
D. Heinrich (M. Latusa, B. Aubin) (EV) – 30:04	3–3
	3–4	33:33 – (PP2) T. Mäntylä (J. Halme, J. Tenute)
	3–5	34:03 – J. Halme (J. Peltola, J. Cepis)
	3–6	48:31 – (SH) J. Makkonen
	3–7	51:18 – J. Leimu (J. Halme, A. Kangasniemi)
	3–8	53:13 – J. Cepis (J. Peltola, V. Ekbom)

59 min
Penalties
49 min
25
Shots
52

25 August 2011; 20:00	Eisbären Berlin (Germany)	4–3 (0–1, 2–0, 2–2)	(Finland) TPS	EnergieVerbund Arena, Dresden; Attendance: 2,050

Game reference

Kevin Nastiuk
Goalies
Aleksis Ahlqvist
Referees:
(Germany) Georg Jakublov
(Germany) Jens Steinecke

	0–1	19:30 – (PP) T. Plíhal (T. Mojžíš)
R. Regehr (F. Busch, B. Tallackson) (PP2) – 24:12	1–1
J. Talbot (J. Sharrow, T. J. Mulock) (DP) – 27:42	2–1
N. Angell (D. Olver, B. Tallackson) (PP) – 43:31	3–1
	3–2	14:52 – J. Hattunen (G. Raboin, V-M. Vittasmäki)
	3–3	15:32 – M. Anttila (J. Cerny)
J. Talbot (T. J. Mulock) (DP) – 59:32	4–3

12 min
Penalties
39 min
47
Shots
22

27 August 2011; 19:15	Red Bull Salzburg (Austria)	4–2 (1–0, 1–1, 2–1)	(Finland) TPS	Eisarena Salzburg, Salzburg; Attendance: 1,342

Game reference

Joshua Tordjman
Goalies
Aleksis Ahlqvist
Referees:
Thomas Bernecker
Georg Veit

T. Raffl (D. Bois, D. Lynch) – 04:11	1–0
R. Abid (M. Latusa, S. Regier) – 20:45	2–0
	2–1	28:38 – G. Raboin (M. Anttila, M. Palmroth)
T. Raffl (R. Earl, D. Bois) – 47:49	3–1
	3–2	58:51 – (PP) T. Plíhal (J. Tuominen)
R. Earl (T. Raffl, D. Bois) (ENG) – 59:30	4–2

4 min
Penalties
10 min
35
Shots
42

27 August 2011; 20:00	Eisbären Berlin (Germany)	1–0 (1–0, 0–0, 0–0)	(Finland) Tappara	Kunsteisstadion Crimmitschau, Crimmitschau; Attendance: 2,123

Game reference
Kevin Nastiuk	Goalies	Jani Nieminen	Referees: (Germany) Richard Schütz (Germany) Jens Steinecke
R. Regehr (B. Tallackson, D. Olver) (PP) – 22:37 / 1–0			Referees: (Germany) Richard Schütz (Germany) Jens Steinecke
18 min	Penalties	14 min	Referees: (Germany) Richard Schütz (Germany) Jens Steinecke
26	Shots	25	Referees: (Germany) Richard Schütz (Germany) Jens Steinecke

1 September 2011; 18:30	TPS (Finland)	3–1 (0–1, 2–0, 1–0)	(Finland) Tappara	HK Arena, Turku; Attendance: 2,922

Game reference

Marek Schwarz
Goalies
Juha Metsola
Referees:
(Finland) Stefan Fonselius
(Finland) Aleksi Rantala

	0–1	?
?	1–1
?	2–1
?	3–1

18 min
Penalties
12 min
35
Shots
22

4 September 2011; 16:00	Färjestad BK (Sweden)	1–4 (0–4, 1–0, 0–0)	(Sweden) Frölunda Indians	Löfbergs Lila Arena, Karlstad; Attendance: 7,352

Game reference

Cristopher Nihlstorp
Goalies
Magnus Hellberg
Referees:
(Sweden) Wolmer Edqvist
(Sweden) Patrik Sjöberg

	0–1	?
	0–2	?
	0–3	?
	0–4	?
?	1–4

8 min
Penalties
12 min
37
Shots
21

=== North Division ===
Team	GP	W	OTW	OTL	L	GF	GA	DIF	PTS
(Finland) Jokerit	8	6	0	0	2	29	18	+11	18
(Sweden) Luleå HF	8	4	1	0	3	23	21	+2	14
(Sweden) Djurgårdens IF	8	4	0	1	3	25	20	+5	13
(Finland) HIFK	8	3	2	0	3	24	19	+5	13
(Czech Republic) Sparta Praha	8	3	0	1	4	20	23	–3	10
(Czech Republic) Slavia Praha	8	2	0	1	5	18	29	–11	7

All times for the games played in Finland are UTC+3, while all times for the other games are UTC+2.

11 August 2011; 19:00	Djurgårdens IF (Sweden)	5–2 (1–1, 3–0, 1–1)	(Czech Republic) Slavia Praha	Hovet, Stockholm; Attendance: 1,743

Game reference

Gustaf Wesslau
Goalies
Miroslav Kopřiva
Referees:
(Sweden) Ulf Rönnmark
(Sweden) Christer Lärking

M. Nilson (M. Tjärnqvist) (PP) – 01:12	1–0
	1–1	18:40 – T. Svoboda (M. Tomica, T. Kůrka)
J. Almtorp (PP) – 20:26	2–1
C. Eklund (K. Lennhammer) – 21:50	3–1
P. Cehlin (J. Norman, M. Carlsson) – 34:28	4–1
J. Norman (M. Carlsson, P. Cehlin) (PP) – 40:31	5–1
	5–2	59:05 – J. Hertl (M. Tomica)

14 min
Penalties
18 min
31
Shots
39

13 August 2011; 16:00	Djurgårdens IF (Sweden)	4–2 (1–0, 2–1, 1–1)	(Czech Republic) Sparta Praha	Hovet, Stockholm; Attendance: 1,248

Game reference

Gustaf Wesslau
Goalies
Martin Falter
Referees:
(Sweden) Christer Lärking
(Sweden) Niclas Johansson

M. Tjärnqvist (M. Nilson, A. Holmqvist) – 06:13	1–0
M. Carlsson (J. Boumedienne, A. Holmqvist) (PP) – 20:52	2–0
M. Tjärnqvist – 29:14	3–0
	3–1	31:22 – M. Broš (I. Rachůnek, M. Sersen)
M. Tjärnqvist (K. Klubertanz, K. Ottosson) (PP) – 46:48	4–1
	4–2	58:50 – (PP) A. Foster (Y. Treille, J. Kasík)

4 min
Penalties
14 min
21
Shots
28

13 August 2011; 17:00	HIFK (Finland)	4–1 (2–0, 2–0, 0–1)	(Finland) Jokerit	Tikkurilan Valtti Areena, Vantaa; Attendance: 1,800

Game reference

Jan Lundell
Goalies
Eero Kilpeläinen
Referees:
(Finland) Jukka Hakkarainen
(Finland) Tom Laaksonen

E. Pöysti (M. Jokela) – 04:28	1–0
K. Kuhta (K. Hirschovits, P. Wirtanen) (PP) – 18:02	2–0
P. Wirtanen (M. Tuomainen) – 24:32	3–0
M. Jokela (V. Peltonen, M. Granlund) – 33:58	4–0
	4–1	51:42 – B. Eaves (I. Filppula)

12 min
Penalties
6 min
21
Shots
28

13 August 2011; 18:30	Luleå HF (Sweden)	1–2 (0–1, 0–0, 1–1)	(Czech Republic) Slavia Praha	Coop Norrbotten Arena, Luleå; Attendance: 4,057

Game reference

Joel Lassinantti
Goalies
Robert Slipcenko
Referees:
(Sweden) Marcus Vinnerborg
(Sweden) Tobias Björk

	0–1	06:57 – T. Svoboda (T. Kůrka, M. Tomica)
J. Vihko (M. Fagerudd, J. Harju) (PP) – 48:39	1–1
	1–2	56:55 – D. Jaškin (J. Sklenář)

10 min
Penalties
12 min
31
Shots
26

14 August 2011; 17:00	Luleå HF (Sweden)	2–1 (0–0, 2–1, 0–0)	(Czech Republic) Sparta Praha	Coop Norrbotten Arena, Luleå; Attendance: 3,872

Game reference

Joel Lassinantti
Goalies
Tomáš Pöpperle
Referees:
(Sweden) Marcus Vinnerborg
(Sweden) Linus Öhlund

S. Sandell (T. Jaakola, J. Vihko) (PP) – 24:29	1–0
K. Komarek (E. Fälth, K. Karlsson) – 30:31	2–0
	2–1	39:30 – P. Tenkrát (M. Broš)

4 min
Penalties
10 min
36
Shots
25

18 August 2011; 18:30	Jokerit (Finland)	2–1 (1–0, 1–0, 0–1)	(Sweden) Luleå HF	Tikkurilan Valtti Areena, Vantaa; Attendance: 1,204

Game reference

Frans Tuohimaa
Goalies
Johan Gustafsson
Referees:
(Finland) Jussi Leppänen
(Finland) Tero Toivola

I. Filppula (N. Hardt, T. Eronen) – 15:36	1–0
I. Filppula (B. Eaves, N. Hardt) – 24:07	2–0
	2–1	40:52 – (PP) E. Fälth (J. Fransson, S. Sandell)

12 min
Penalties
10 min
35
Shots
35

19 August 2011; 17:30	Slavia Praha (Czech Republic)	2–6 (0–2, 1–3, 1–1)	(Czech Republic) Sparta Praha	Eden Arena, Prague; Attendance: 2,280

Game reference

Miroslav Kopřiva
Goalies
Martin Falter
Referees:
(Czech Republic) Michal Hrubý
(Czech Republic) Jakub Smitka

	0–1	00:38 – P. Jansky (I. Rachůnek, A. Lapšanský)
	0–2	18:28 – P. Tenkrát (P. Ton, M. Bližňák)
	0–3	20:20 – T. Milam
	0–4	20:36 – (PP) P. Ton (P. Tenkrát, A. Krstev)
J. Doležal (P. Jelínek, L. Špelda) (PP) – 21:36	1–4
	1–5	24:39 – (PP) P. Tenkrát (M. Sersen, T. Milam)
J. Sklenář (J. Šulc) (PP) – 41:58	2–5
	2–6	56:27 – M. Bližňák (P. Ton, P. Tenkrát)

44 min
Penalties
58 min
31
Shots
25

19 August 2011; 18:30	HIFK (Finland)	5–2 (2–1, 1–1, 2–0)	(Sweden) Luleå HF	Tikkurilan Valtti Areena, Vantaa; Attendance: 1,548

Game reference

Juuso Riksman
Goalies
Johan Gustafsson
Referees:
(Finland) Jukka Hakkarainen
(Finland) Tom Laaksonen

K. Hirschovits (M. Kankaanperä, J. Ahtola) (PP) – 14:32	1–0
	1–1	15:00 – S. Hjalmarsson (E. Fälth, C. Abbott)
M. Granlund (V. Peltonen, M. Kousa) – 18:58	2–1
V. Peltonen (T. Söderholm, M. Kankaanperä) – 29:25	3–1
	3–2	35:56 – (PP) T. Jaakola (V. Viitaluoma, M. Fagerudd)
I. Melart (K. Hirschovits, J. Ahtola) – 41:38	4–2
T. Söderholm (M. Granlund, E. Somervuori) (PP) – 53:03	5–2

14 min
Penalties
8 min
30
Shots
22

20 August 2011; 17:00	Jokerit (Finland)	1–4 (0–1, 1–3, 0–0)	(Sweden) Djurgårdens IF	Tikkurilan Valtti Areena, Vantaa; Attendance: 1,524

Game reference

Eero Kilpeläinen
Goalies
Gustaf Wesslau
Referees:
(Finland) Tom Laaksonen
(Finland) Mikko Kaukokari

	0–1	09:31 – (PP) K. Klubertanz (K. Ottosson, D. Tjärnqvist)
	0–2	33:41 – M. Kempe (M. Nilson, P. Åberg)
B. Eaves (I. Filppula, M. Nordlund) – 34:24	1–2
	1–3	37:12 – M. Nilson (G. Wesslau)
	1–4	38:00 – (PP) K. Ottosson (M. Nilson, K. Klubertanz)

8 min
Penalties
14 min
35
Shots
23

21 August 2011; 19:00	HIFK (Finland)	4–3 OT (3–0, 0–2, 0–1) (OT: 1–0)	(Sweden) Djurgårdens IF	Tikkurilan Valtti Areena, Vantaa; Attendance: 1,800

Game reference

Jan Lundell
Goalies
Tim Sandberg
Referees:
(Finland) Mikko Kaukokari
(Finland) Tom Laaksonen

M. Jokela (T. Söderholm, M. Granlund) – 09:07	1–0
V. Peltonen (M. Granlund) (SH) – 10:24	2–0
E. Pöysti (K. Hirschovits, T. Söderholm) – 19:40	3–0
	3–1	25:21 – (PP) A. Holmqvist (J. Boumedienne, M. Nilson)
	3–2	36:47 – F. Claesson (K. Ottosson, P. Åberg)
	3–3	55:02 – K. Klubertanz (M. Kempe)
K. Hirschovits (M. Jokela, T. Söderholm) (PP) – 63:28	4–3

38 min
Penalties
24 min
34
Shots
34

25 August 2011; 17:30	Slavia Praha (Czech Republic)	2–4 (0–3, 1–1, 1–0)	(Finland) Jokerit	Eden Arena, Prague; Attendance: 920

Game reference

Miroslav Kopřiva
Goalies
Eero Kilpeläinen
Referees:
(Czech Republic) Milan Minář
(Czech Republic) Martin Fraňo

	0–1	13:34 – (PP) T. Pulkkinen (A. Kerälä, J. Lahti)
	0–2	15:15 – J. Dehner
	0–3	15:36 – J. Lahti (T. Pulkkinen, T. Eronen)
V. Roth (P. Kadlec) (PP2) – 20:42	1–3
	1–4	20:56 – (SH) B. Eaves (I. Filppula)
V. Růžička (PP) – 44:18	2–4

12 min
Penalties
14 min
31
Shots
40

25 August 2011; 18:30	Sparta Praha (Czech Republic)	3–2 (0–0, 0–1, 3–1)	(Finland) HIFK	Tesla Arena, Prague; Attendance: 988

Game reference

Tomáš Pöpperle
Goalies
Juuso Riksman
Referees:
(Czech Republic) Antonín Jeřábek
(Czech Republic) Štěpán Souček

	0–1	21:55 – C. Silfver (K. Hirschovits, E. Pöysti)
P. Janský (M. Sersen) (PP) – 45:47	1–1
P. Tenkrát (P. Ton) – 47:40	2–1
	2–2	54:10 – J. Ahtola (M. Kousa)
P. Tenkrát (M. Bližňák) – 57:14	3–2

10 min
Penalties
12 min
33
Shots
24

27 August 2011; 16:30	Slavia Praha (Czech Republic)	2–3 GWS (1–1, 0–0, 1–1) (OT: 0–0) (SO: 0–1)	(Finland) HIFK	Eden Arena, Prague; Attendance: 655

Game reference

Dominik Furch
Goalies
Jan Lundell
Referees:
(Czech Republic) Pavel Hodek
(Czech Republic) Robin Sir

	0–1	04:20 – (PP) E. Somervuori (T. Tallberg)
P. Kadlec (V. Roth, V. Růžička) (PP2) – 19:55	1–1
	1–2	42:36 – M. Åsten (T. Järvinen)
T. Svoboda (T. Kůrka) – 53:55	2–2

T. Svoboda
T. Hertl
V. Růžička
Shootout
Mi. Granlund
K. Hirschovits
Ma. Granlund
12 min
Penalties
20 min
41
Shots
35

27 August 2011; 17:00	Sparta Praha (Czech Republic)	2–4 (0–0, 0–4, 2–0)	(Finland) Jokerit	Tesla Arena, Prague; Attendance: 842

Game reference

Martin Falter
Goalies
Frans Tuohimaa
Referees:
(Czech Republic) Ján Hribik
(Czech Republic) František Kalivoda

	0–1	21:36 – J. Lahti
	0–2	30:48 – T. Pulkkinen (A. Kerälä, J. Lahti)
	0–3	35:07 – B. Eaves (N. Hardt, R. Hahl)
	0–4	35:39 – P. Kalus (R. Hahl, A-J. Niemi)
M. Broš (P. Jansky, I. Rachůnek)– 58:57	1–4
Y. Treille (S. Treille) – 59:57	2–4

14 min
Penalties
12 min
23
Shots
32

1 September 2011; 19:00	Djurgårdens IF (Sweden)	2–3 (1–0, 0–2, 1–1)	(Sweden) Luleå HF	Hovet, Stockholm; Attendance: 2,944

Game reference

Gustaf Wesslau
Goalies
Johan Gustafsson
Referees:
(Sweden) Thomas Andersson
(Sweden) David Bergman

Ch. Eklund (S. Söder) - 09:47	1–0
	1–1	26:25 - (PP) D. Fleury (J. Vihko)
	1–2	26:56 - S. Enterfeldts (K. Karlsson, K. Komarek)
K. Ottosson - 42:25	2–2
	2–3	56:09 - (PP) D. Fleury (S. Enterfeldts, V. Viitauoma)

95 min
Penalties
70 min
25
Shots
28

=== South Division ===
Team	GP	W	OTW	OTL	L	GF	GA	DIF	PTS
(Czech Republic) Pojišťovna Pardubice	8	4	1	1	2	23	21	+2	15
(Sweden) Linköpings HC	8	3	1	2	2	19	18	+1	13
(Germany) Adler Mannheim	8	4	0	0	4	22	24	–2	12
(Sweden) HV71	8	3	0	1	4	15	21	–6	10
(Czech Republic) Bílí Tygři Liberec	8	1	2	0	5	16	19	–3	7
(Czech Republic) Kometa Brno	8	1	1	0	6	20	27	–7	5

All times are local (UTC+2).

11 August 2011; 20:00	Pojišťovna Pardubice (Czech Republic)	3–2 (1–0, 1–1, 1–1)	(Sweden) Linköpings HC	Arena Hradec Králové, Hradec Králové; Attendance: 1,342

Game reference

Martin Ruzicka
Goalies
Fredrik Norrena
Referees:
(Czech Republic) Martin Homola
(Czech Republic) Milan Polák

C. Elkins (V. Koci, A. Píša) (PP) – 18:27	1–0
	1–1	28:31 – (PP) K. Dahlbeck (P. Arlbrandt)
C. Elkins (M. Bartek) (PP) – 35:24	2–1
D. Rakos (L. Radil) – 47:21	3–1
	3–2	56:53 – (PP) C. Söderberg (M. Håkanson, M. Johansson)

44 min
Penalties
28 min
35
Shots
26

13 August 2011; 19:30	Pojišťovna Pardubice (Czech Republic)	3–2 (1–0, 0–0, 2–2)	(Sweden) HV71	ČEZ Aréna, Pardubice; Attendance: 3,528

Game reference

Martin Ruzicka
Goalies
Andreas Andersson
Referees:
(Czech Republic) František Kalivoda
(Czech Republic) Jakub Smitka

T. Nosek (M. Bartek, C. Elkins) – 06:54	1–0
	1–1	40:34 – J. Joensen
L. Radil (T. Zohorna, D. Rakos) – 41:48	2–1
T. Zohorna (D. Rakos, M. Bartek) – 45:11	3–1
	3–2	52:04 – J. Thörnberg

26 min
Penalties
18 min
27
Shots
32

13 August 2011; 19:35	Kometa Brno (Czech Republic)	5–4 GWS (0–2, 2–2, 2–0) (OT: 0–0) (SO: 1–0)	(Sweden) Linköpings HC	Hala Rondo, Brno; Attendance: 3,946

Game reference

Sasu Hovi
Goalies
Fredrik Norrena
Referees:
(Czech Republic) Martin Homola
(Czech Republic) Antonín Jeřábek

	0–1	12:10 – (PP) A. Molinder (C. Söderberg, M. Johansson)
	0–2	14:39 – M. Håkanson (E. Lindhagen)
	0–3	22:31 – (PP) A. Jämtin (C. Söderberg)
T. Pospíšil (A. Podkonický) (PP) – 31:22	1–3
T. Pospíšil (T. Žižka) – 35:04	2–3
	2–4	37:39 – M. Håkanson (J. Åkerman)
A. Podkonický (T. Žižka) – 54:15	3–4
M. Holec (R. Erat, T. Malec) – 55:13	4–4

T. Pospíšil
A. Podkonický (miss)
Shootout
(miss) J. Åkerman
(miss) M. Håkanson
(miss) M. Johansson
30 min
Penalties
34 min
27
Shots
39

14 August 2011; 19:35	Kometa Brno (Czech Republic)	2–3 (1–1, 0–0, 1–2)	(Sweden) HV71	Hala Rondo, Brno; Attendance: 3,355

Game reference

Jiří Trvaj
Goalies
Daniel Larsson
Referees:
(Czech Republic) Pavel Vaculík
(Czech Republic) Milan Minář

T. Pospíšil (T. Žižka) (PP) – 03:42	1–0
	1–1	08:49 – (PP) J. Voutilainen (J. Davidsson, J. Fasth)
	1–2	42:14 – A. Falk (J. Fasth)
	1–3	45:22 – J. Davidsson (N. Welch)
R. Erat (PP) – 56:36	2–3

14 min
Penalties
22 min
30
Shots
24

16 August 2011; 18:30	Bílí Tygři Liberec (Czech Republic)	1–2 (0–0, 0–2, 1–0)	(Czech Republic) Kometa Brno	Svijanská Aréna, Liberec; Attendance: 1,500

Game reference

Tomáš Vošvrda
Goalies
Sasu Hovi
Referees:
(Czech Republic) Ján Hribik
(Czech Republic) František Kalivoda

	0–1	25:18 – H. Zohorna (J. Švrček)
	0–2	39:38 – (PP) J. Švrček (T. Pospíšil, T. Žižka)
J. Kudrna (D. Bortňák, M. Čakajík) (PP) – 54:50	1–2

12 min
Penalties
14 min
34
Shots
31

18 August 2011; 18:30	Bílí Tygři Liberec (Czech Republic)	2–1 OT (0–0, 0–0, 1–1) (OT: 1–0)	(Czech Republic) Pojišťovna Pardubice	Svijanská Aréna, Liberec; Attendance: 1,500

Game reference

Tomáš Vošvrda
Goalies
Vladislav Koutský
Referees:
(Czech Republic) Ján Hribik
(Czech Republic) Jakub Smitka

	0–1	41:55 – R. Kousal (L. Nahodil, J. Kolář)
M. Bartovič (M. Bárta) – 52:23	1–1
M. Bartovič (P. Nedvěd) – 60:52	2–1

10 min
Penalties
12 min
28
Shots
25

19 August 2011; 19:30	Adler Mannheim (Germany)	5–4 (0–0, 1–0, 4–4)	(Czech Republic) Kometa Brno	Tiroler Wasserkraft Arena, Innsbruck; Attendance: 650

Game reference

Felix Brückmann
Goalies
Jiří Trvaj
Referees:
(Germany) Daniel Piechaczek
(Germany) Florian Zehetleitner

A. Mitchell (Y. Seidenberg, J. Sifers) – 29:59	1–0
F. Mauer (C. Ullmann, Y. Seidenberg) – 40:40	2–0
	2–1	43:03 – P. Šenkeřík (J. Křivohlávek)
	2–2	47:03 – (SH) T. Pospíšil (A. Podkonický)
J. Sifers (S. Wagner, Y. Seidenberg) (PP) – 47:55	3–2
A. Mitchell (C. Lee, Y. Lehoux) (PP) – 51:27	4–2
	4–3	48:03 – (PP) R. Bičánek (P. Hubáček)
F. Mauer (Y. Lehoux, K. Magowan) – 59:01	5–3
	5–4	59:48 – R. Erat (T. Pospíšil, M. Kempný)

10 min
Penalties
16 min
32
Shots
26

20 August 2011; 17:00	Adler Mannheim (Germany)	1–0 (1–0, 0–0, 0–0)	(Czech Republic) Pojišťovna Pardubice	Tiroler Wasserkraft Arena, Innsbruck; Attendance: 900

Game reference
Felix Brückmann	Goalies	Martin Ruzicka	Referees: (Germany) Daniel Piechaczek (Germany) Florian Zehetleitner
D. Reul (F. Mauer, Y. Seidenberg) – 12:25 / 1–0			Referees: (Germany) Daniel Piechaczek (Germany) Florian Zehetleitner
32 min	Penalties	30 min	Referees: (Germany) Daniel Piechaczek (Germany) Florian Zehetleitner
13	Shots	42	Referees: (Germany) Daniel Piechaczek (Germany) Florian Zehetleitner

23 August 2011; 19:00	HV71 (Sweden)	2–3 OT (1–0, 1–2, 0–0) (OT: 0–1)	(Sweden) Linköpings HC	Bredstorpshallen, Tranås; Attendance: 1,274

Game reference

Daniel Larsson
Goalies
Christian Engstrand
Referees:
(Sweden) Christer Lärking
(Sweden) Niclas Johansson

F. Bremberg (J. Thörnberg, N. Welch) – 06:56	1–0
	1–1	29:28 – (PP) A. Jämtin (M. Håkanson, M. Johansson)
	1–2	29:49 – V. Jigmalm (E. Lindhagen)
J. Voutilainen (J. Davidsson, P. Ledin) (PP) – 34:03	2–2
	2–3	64:05 – J. Erikson (M. Håkanson, J. Åkerman)

6 min
Penalties
12 min
43
Shots
35

25 August 2011; 19:00	HV71 (Sweden)	0–3 (0–2, 0–0, 0–1)	(Czech Republic) Bílí Tygři Liberec	Nässjö Ishall, Nässjö; Attendance: 812

Game reference

Andreas Andersson
Goalies
Tomáš Vošvrda
Referees:
(Sweden) Morgan Johansson
(Sweden) Marcus Linde

0–1	09:21 – P. Nedvěd (M. Trončinský)
0–2	12:59 – J. Kudrna (A. Dušek, J. Výtisk)
0–3	58:40 – (ENG) D. Špaček (D. Štich)

22 min
Penalties
22 min
39
Shots
30

25 August 2011; 19:00	Linköpings HC (Sweden)	2–0 (1–0, 0–0, 1–0)	(Germany) Adler Mannheim	Stångebrohallen, Linköping; Attendance: 1,653

Game reference
Christian Engstrand	Goalies	Felix Brückmann	Referees: (Sweden) Pär Claesson (Sweden) Niklas Johansson
M. Håkanson (R. Figren, E. Lindhagen) (PP) – 19:03 / 1–0; N. Hävelid (P. Arlbrandt, C. Söderberg) (PP2) – 56:36 / 2–0			Referees: (Sweden) Pär Claesson (Sweden) Niklas Johansson
12 min	Penalties	16 min	Referees: (Sweden) Pär Claesson (Sweden) Niklas Johansson
28	Shots	30	Referees: (Sweden) Pär Claesson (Sweden) Niklas Johansson

27 August 2011; 16:00	HV71 (Sweden)	4–3 (0–0, 2–2, 2–1)	(Germany) Adler Mannheim	Aplarinken, Värnamo; Attendance: 890

Game reference

Andreas Andersson
Goalies
Patrick Galbraith
Referees:
Morgan Johansson
Pehr Claesson

F. Bremberg (M. Luoma, D. Rahimi) – 02:29	1–0
J. Voutilainen (M. Luoma, J. Davidsson) (PP) – 06:51	2–0
	2–1	12:21 – (EV) R. Adendt (S. Wagner, Y. Seidenberg)
	2–2	19:56 – (PP) S. Wagner (C. MacDonald, Y. Seidenberg)
J. Joensuu (J. Krog, N. Welch) – 46:02	3–2
P. Ledin (J. Voutilainen, J. Davidsson) – 51:19	4–2
	4–3	53:09 – C. MacDonald (J. Sifers, M. Plachta)

12 min
Penalties
10 min
30
Shots
24

27 August 2011; 16:00	Linköpings HC (Sweden)	1–2 GWS (0–0, 0–1, 1–0) (OT: 0–0) (SO: 0–1)	(Czech Republic) Bílí Tygři Liberec	Stångebrohallen, Linköping; Attendance: 1,148

Game reference
Fredrik Norrena	Goalies	Marek Pinc	Referees: Wolmer Edqvist; Mikael Sjökvist
/ 0–1 / 12:20 – D. Stich (D. Hay); R. Figren (E. Lindhagen, J. Åkerman) (PP) – 55:49 / 1–1			Referees: Wolmer Edqvist; Mikael Sjökvist
R. Figren; C. Söderberg; J. Åkerman (miss)	Shootout	M. Bárta; P. Nedvěd; (miss) J. Kudrna	Referees: Wolmer Edqvist; Mikael Sjökvist
10 min	Penalties	14 min	Referees: Wolmer Edqvist; Mikael Sjökvist
37	Shots	28	Referees: Wolmer Edqvist; Mikael Sjökvist

27 August 2011; 19:30	Pojišťovna Pardubice (Czech Republic)	5–4 (1–2, 3–0, 1–2)	(Czech Republic) Kometa Brno	ČEZ Aréna, Pardubice; Attendance: 1,862

Game reference

Martin Ruzicka
Goalies
Jiří Trvaj
Referees:
(Czech Republic) Milan Minář
(Czech Republic) Jakub Smitka

P. Koukal (L. Nahodil) – 00:42	1–0
	1–1	04:51 – M. Kempný
	1–2	11:09 – B. Jankovič (R. Hruška)
A. Píša (J. Stary) (PP) – 23:15	2–2
J. Sim (T. Zohorna, D. Rakos) – 28:58	3–2
J. Buchtele (C. Borer, V. Benák) (PP) – 36:02	4–2
	4–3	43:27 – J. Koreis (J. Svoboda)
	4–4	46:44 – J. Svoboda (J. Koreis)
M. Bartek (D. Rakos, T. Zohorna) – 57:53	5–4

33 min
Penalties
10 min
24
Shots
34

1 September 2011; 18:30	Bílí Tygři Liberec (Czech Republic)	1–3 (0–1, 0–1, 1–1)	(Germany) Adler Mannheim	Tipsport Arena, Liberec; Attendance: 2,056

Game reference

Tomáš Vošvrda
Goalies
Patrick Galbraith
Referees:
(Czech Republic) Jan Hribik
(Czech Republic) Martin Homola

	0–1	14:19 - N. Goc
	0–2	28:47 - A. Mitchell
T. Vak (D. Bortňák, T. Vošvrda) - 46:49	1–2
	1–3	59:59 - R. Arendt

10 min
Penalties
16 min
27
Shots
22

=== East Division ===
Team	GP	W	OTW	OTL	L	GF	GA	DIF	PTS
(Czech Republic) Plzeň 1929	8	5	2	1	0	30	16	+14	20
(Czech Republic) České Budějovice	8	5	2	1	0	26	15	+11	20
(Slovakia) Slovan Bratislava	8	3	2	0	3	25	20	+5	13
(Finland) Oulun Kärpät	8	1	2	3	2	21	23	–2	10
(Finland) KalPa	8	2	0	3	3	19	21	–2	9
(Austria) Vienna Capitals	8	1	2	0	5	18	30	–12	7

All times for the games played in Finland are UTC+3, while all times for the other games are UTC+2.

11 August 2011; 18:00	Slovan Bratislava (Slovakia)	2–1 GWS (0–1, 0–0, 1–0) (OT: 0–0) (SO: 1–0)	(Finland) KalPa	Slovnaft Arena, Bratislava; Attendance: 4,290

Game reference
Branislav Konrad	Goalies	Ari Ahonen	Referees: (Slovakia) Vladimír Baluška (Slovakia) Daniel Konc
/ 0–1 / 15:03 – S. Salminen (T. Kiiskinen); M. Preisinger (D. Skokan, J. Lipiansky) – 56:56 / 1–1			Referees: (Slovakia) Vladimír Baluška (Slovakia) Daniel Konc
M. Stajnoch; M. Hudec (miss); M. Preisinger (miss); R. Kukumberg (miss); D. Skokan (miss); J. Lipiansky (miss); M. Macho	Shootout	T. Kiiskinen; (miss) A. Masuhr; (miss) S. Kapanen; (miss) S. Salminen; (miss) I. Pakarinen; (miss) J. Hentunen; (miss) J. Ikonen	Referees: (Slovakia) Vladimír Baluška (Slovakia) Daniel Konc
16 min	Penalties	10 min	Referees: (Slovakia) Vladimír Baluška (Slovakia) Daniel Konc
19	Shots	43	Referees: (Slovakia) Vladimír Baluška (Slovakia) Daniel Konc

11 August 2011; 20:00	Vienna Capitals (Austria)	3–2 GWS (0–1, 1–0, 1–1) (OT: 0–0) (SO: 1–0)	(Finland) Oulun Kärpät	Albert Schultz Eishalle, Vienna; Attendance: 4,700

Game reference

Reinhard Divis
Goalies
Ville Hostikka
Referees:
(Austria) Wolfgang Fussi
(Austria) Robert Falkner

	0–1	18:22 – M. Vondrka (M. Lehtonen, I. Huml)
F. Fortier (R. Rotter, K. McLeod) (PP) – 26:26	1–1
	1–2	44:48 – (PP) I. Huml (V. Mäntymaa, J. Junttila)
R. Rotter (P. Kavanagh, B. Gratton) (PP) – 41:54	2–2

F. Fortier
P. Kavanagh
P. Casparsson
M. Rodman
J. Ferland
Shootout
I. Huml
J-P. Haataja
M. Vondrka
J. Junttila
J. Komulainen
26 min
Penalties
42 min
42
Shots
37

12 August 2011; 17:30	České Budějovice (Czech Republic)	2–3 OT (0–0, 1–1, 1–1) (OT: 0–1)	(Czech Republic) Plzeň 1929	Budvar Arena, České Budějovice; Attendance: 1,550

Game reference

Jakub Kovář
Goalies
Adam Svoboda
Referees:
(Czech Republic) Martin Fraňo
(Czech Republic) Pavel Hodek

	0–1	36:19 – G. Kinrade (J. Kovář)
P. Kašpařík (F. Ptáček, A. Kranjc) (PP) – 37:55	1–1
R. Vydarený (J. Langhammer) (PP) – 47:29	2–1
	2–2	53:45 – G. Kinrade (M. Straka)
	2–3	62:54 – T. Vlasák (F. Kaberle)

43 min
Penalties
43 min
33
Shots
33

13 August 2011; 18:00	Slovan Bratislava (Slovakia)	4–1 (2–0, 1–1, 1–0)	(Finland) Oulun Kärpät	Slovnaft Arena, Bratislava; Attendance: 4,316

Game reference

Branislav Konrád
Goalies
Tomi Karhunen
Referees:
(Slovakia) Daniel Konc
(Slovakia) Peter Jonak

J. Lipiansky (D. Skokan, I. Svarny) – 02:29	1–0
M. Bakoš (M. Macho, T. Bulík) (PP) – 08:34	2–0
	2–1	21:57 – J. Junttila (I. Huml, M. Lehtonen)
M. Macho (M. Bakoš, I. Svarny) (PP) – 33:09	3–1
M. Bakoš (T. Bulík, M. Macho) (PP) – 55:21	4–1

8 min
Penalties
10 min
27
Shots
28

13 August 2011; 20:00	Vienna Capitals (Austria)	2–4 (2–4, 0–0, 0–0)	(Finland) KalPa	Albert Schultz Eishalle, Vienna; Attendance: 3,100

Game reference

Reinhard Divis
Goalies
Ari Ahonen
Referees:
(Austria) Thomas Berneker
(Austria) Christian Potocan

	0–1	01:42 – I. Pakarinen (J. Rissanen)
	0–2	03:11 – (PP) J. Riekkinen (M. Kauppinen, S. Salminen)
	0–3	14:29 – (PP) A. Masuhr (M. Kuparinen)
F. Fortier (J. Insana, B. Gratton) (PP) – 16:59	1–3
F. Fortier (K. McLeod, B. Gratton) – 19:04	2–3
	2–4	19:55 – (PP) T. Kiiskinen (M. Kauppinen, S. Salminen)

28 min
Penalties
20 min
30
Shots
23

18 August 2011; 18:30	KalPa (Finland)	2–3 GWS (0–0, 2–2, 0–0) (OT: 0–0) (SO: 0–1)	(Czech Republic) České Budějovice	Kuopion Jäähalli, Kuopio; Attendance: 3,433

Game reference

Ari Ahonen
Goalies
Jakub Kovář
Referees:
(Finland) Jyri Rönn
(Finland) Antti Hämäläinen

J. Hentunen (A. Masuhr, S. Kapanen) (PP) – 26:44	1–0
	1–1	32:03 – P. Mikuš (D. Kuchejda, T. Mertl)
	1–2	34:33 – (PP) F. Ptáček (P. Kašpařík)
J. Junnila (O. Saarinen) – 37:35	2–2

S. Kapanen
T. Kiiskinen
I. Pakarinen (miss)
O. Saarinen
Shootout
V. Pletka
M. Gulaš
J. Šimánek
P. Sailer
8 min
Penalties
12 min
30
Shots
32

18 August 2011; 18:30	Oulun Kärpät (Finland)	2–3 GWS (0–0, 0–0, 2–2)	(Czech Republic) Plzeň 1929	Tiivi Arena, Haapajärvi; Attendance: 785

Game reference

Ville Hostikka
Goalies
Adam Svoboda
Referees:
(Finland) Vesa Keränen
(Finland) Tuomo Sorakangas

M. Vondrka (J. Junttila, I. Huml) – 41:08	1–0
	1–1	42:40 – T. Pitule
J. Kemppainen (K. Koskenkorva, A. Ohtamaa) (PP) – 54:06	2–1
	2–2	57:32 – R. Duda (J. Hanzlík, M. Straka)

J-P. Haataja
M. Vondrka (miss)
I. Huml (miss)
Shootout
J. Kovář
(miss) T. Vlasák
J. Hlinka
14 min
Penalties
20 min
24
Shots
28

19 August 2011; 18:00	Slovan Bratislava (Slovakia)	6–1 (1–0, 3–1, 2–0)	(Austria) Vienna Capitals	Slovnaft Arena, Bratislava; Attendance: 5,477

Game reference

Branislav Konrád
Goalies
Reinhard Divis
Referees:
(Slovakia) Vladimír Baluška
(Slovakia) Daniel Konc

M. Preisinger (L. Kozak) – 18:14	1–0
M. Hudec (R. Kukumberg, T. Bulík) (PP) – 20:07	2–0
M. Bakos (P. Frühauf, J. Lipiansky) (PP) – 20:38	3–0
A. Kudrna (D. Skokan, J. Lipiansky) – 30:26	4–0
	4–1	36:15 – (SH) B. Gratton (F. Fortier, P. Kavanagh)
J. Ciger (SH) – 50:42	5–1
M. Stajnoch (M. Bakos, O. Janik) (PP) – 54:31	6–1

24 min
Penalties
22 min
29
Shots
37

20 August 2011; 17:00	Oulun Kärpät (Finland)	1–2 (1–1, 0–1, 0–0)	(Czech Republic) České Budějovice	Nivala Arena, Nivala; Attendance: 1,300

Game reference

Tomi Karhunen
Goalies
Jakub Kovář
Referees:
(Finland) Antti Hämäläinen
(Finland) Jyri Rönn

J. Komulainen (T. Körkkö) – 06:14	1–0
	1–1	16:01 – R. Pšurný (D. Kuchejda, T. Mertl)
	1–2	24:47 – F. Ptáček (R. Martynek, T. Mertl)

8 min
Penalties
10 min
27
Shots
33

20 August 2011; 18:00	KalPa (Finland)	0–4 (0–1, 0–2, 0–1)	(Czech Republic) Plzeň 1929	Kuopion Jäähalli, Kuopio; Attendance: 3,311

Game reference

Ari Ahonen
Goalies
Adam Svoboda
Referees:
(Finland) Tuomo Sorakangas
(Finland) Vesa Keränen

0–1	15:29 – T. Vlasák (O. Kratěna, J. Hlinka)
0–2	22:58 – T. Vlasák (N. Pierre, F. Kaberle)
0–3	32:18 – J. Hanzlík (J. Kovář, T. Pitule)
0–4	53:49 – T. Vlasák (M. Straka)

10 min
Penalties
14 min
19
Shots
15

25 August 2011; 17:30	České Budějovice (Czech Republic)	2–1 (1–0, 1–1, 0–0)	(Slovakia) Slovan Bratislava	Budvar Arena, České Budějovice; Attendance: 2,150

Game reference

Jakub Kovář
Goalies
Branislav Konrád
Referees:
(Czech Republic) Robin Sir
(Czech Republic) Jan Hribik

J. Novák (P. Kašpařík) – 18:48	1–0
J. Langhammer (J. Novák, M. Podlešák) (PP) – 37:26	2–0
	2–1	37:59 – M. Hudec (M. Presinger)

8 min
Penalties
12 min
40
Shots
25

25 August 2011; 18:00	Plzeň 1929 (Czech Republic)	3–1 (0–0, 1–0, 2–1)	(Austria) Vienna Capitals	ČEZ Aréna, Plzeň; Attendance: 2,177

Game reference

Adam Svoboda
Goalies
Reinhard Divis
Referees:
(Czech Republic) Vladimír Šindler
(Czech Republic) Roman Svoboda

P. Sýkora (R. Duda) – 30:11	1–0
R. Duda (P. Sýkora, J. Kovář) (PP) – 44:35	2–0
	2–1	53:55 – (PP) J. Ferland (D. Bjornlie, R. Rotter)
T. Vlasák (ENG) – 59:51	3–1

12 min
Penalties
16 min
33
Shots
21

27 August 2011; 17:00	České Budějovice (Czech Republic)	4–0 (2–0, 1–0, 1–0)	(Austria) Vienna Capitals	Budvar Arena, České Budějovice; Attendance: 2,100

Game reference

Jakub Kovář
Goalies
Reinhard Divis
Referees:
Martin Homola
Štěpán Souček

P. Kašpařík (J. Novák) – 03:55	1–0
J. Novák (R. Pšurný, T. Mertl) (PP) – 06:33	2–0
D. Kuchejda (R. Pšurný, T. Mertl) – 34:22	3–0
F. Ptáček (M. Mikeska, M. Podlešák) (PP2) – 49:27	4–0

41 min
Penalties
63 min
38
Shots
18

27 August 2011; 18:00	Plzeň 1929 (Czech Republic)	4–5 GWS (0–2, 3–1, 1–1) (OT: 0–0) (SO: 0–1)	(Slovakia) Slovan Bratislava	ČEZ Aréna, Plzeň; Attendance: 2,189

Game reference

Adam Svoboda
Goalies
Branislav Konrád
Referees:
(Czech Republic) Vladimír Šindler
(Czech Republic) Martin Fraňoo

	0–1	05:54 – M. Presinger (M. Hudec, M. Jass)
	0–2	19:44 – L. Hudacek (J. Lipiansky)
R. Duda (P. Sýkora, M. Straka) (PP) – 24:17	1–2
	1–3	31:24 – (PP) M. Hudec (M. Preisinger, P. Frühauf)
J. Heřman (P. Sýkora, J. Jeřábek) – 36:00	2–3
O. Kratěna (M. Straka) (PP) – 39:34	3–3
	3–4	47:37 – M. Macho (P. Frühauf, T. Bulík)
R. Duda (J. Kovář) – 52:03	4–4

R. Duda
O. Kratěna
P. Sýkora
J. Hlinka
T. Vlasák
Shootout
M. Stajnoch
M. Hudec
M. Macho
J. Lipansky
M. Presinger
14 min
Penalties
12 min
42
Shots
35

31 August 2011; 18:30	KalPa (Finland)	3–4 GWS (0–0, 1–0, 2–3) (OT: 0–0) (SO: 0–1)	(Finland) Oulun Kärpät	Kuopion Jäähalli, Kuopio; Attendance: 3,082

Game reference

Juha Toivonen
Goalies
Tomi Karhunen
Referees:
(Finland) Antti Hämäläinen
(Finland) Jarno Heikkinen

I. Pakarinen (J. Rissanen) - 25:13	1–0
S. Salminen (J. Riekkinen, I. Pakarinen) - 43:20	2–0
	2–1	48:09 - J. Komulainen (J. Kemppainen)
S. Salminen - 51:11	3–1
	3–2	58:01 - M. Salomäki (J. P. Haataja)
	3–3	58:49 - K. Koskenkorva

S. Salminen
T. Kiiskinen
S. Kapanen (miss)
J. Rissanen
J. Hentunen (miss)
Shootout
J. Viuhkola
(miss) J. P. Haataja
J. Donskoi
I. Huml
J. Komulainen
39 min
Penalties
16 min
18
Shots
30

=== Division vs. Division games ===
==== West Division vs. North Division ====
All times for the games played in Finland are UTC+3, while all times for the other games are UTC+2.

14 August 2011; 16:00	Djurgårdens IF (Sweden)	4–2 (1–1, 2–1, 1–0)	(Austria) Red Bull Salzburg	Hovet, Stockholm; Attendance: 1,818

Game reference

Tim Sandberg
Goalies
Thomas Höneckl
Referees:
(Sweden) Niclas Johansson
(Sweden) Ulf Rönnmark

	0–1	17:28 – T. Raffl (R. Earl)
M. Carlsson (C. Eklund) – 18:11	1–1
	1–2	23:32 – (PP) B. Aubin (D. Erlich, M. Trattnig)
J. Norman (P. Cehlin, M. Carlsson) – 25:28	2–2
P. Holm (P. Cehlin) – 39:53	3–2
A. Holmqvist (P. Cehlin, J. Boumedienne) – 54:38	4–2

39 min
Penalties
39 min
24
Shots
41

14 August 2011; 18:30	TPS (Finland)	2–0 (0–0, 1–0, 1–0)	(Czech Republic) Slavia Praha	HK Arena, Turku; Attendance: 2,673

Game reference
Marek Schwarz	Goalies	Miroslav Kopřiva	Referees: (Finland) Stefan Fonselius (Finland) Aleksi Rantala
M. Anttila (G. Raboin) – 22:17 / 1–0; T. Plíhal (T. Seppänen) (ENG) – 59:58 / 2–0			Referees: (Finland) Stefan Fonselius (Finland) Aleksi Rantala
10 min	Penalties	18 min	Referees: (Finland) Stefan Fonselius (Finland) Aleksi Rantala
30	Shots	29	Referees: (Finland) Stefan Fonselius (Finland) Aleksi Rantala

21 August 2011; 13:00	Jokerit (Finland)	7–3 (1–1, 5–2, 1–0)	(Sweden) Frölunda Indians	Tikkurilan Valtti Areena, Vantaa; Attendance: 1,284

Game reference

Zoltán Hetényi
Goalies
Magnus Hellberg
Referees:
(Finland) Jukka Hakkarainen
(Finland) Mikko Vanninen

T. Pulkkinen (J. Klingberg, A. Kerälä) (PP) – 04:22	1–0
	1–1	07:07 – D. Umičević (H. Tömmernes)
	1–2	24:23 – J. Tolsa
I. Filppula (B. Eaves, M. Hännikäinen) – 25:24	2–2
	2–3	32:33 – (PP) C. Persson (F. Eriksson, T. Koivisto)
R. Hahl (M. Nordlund) (SH) – 36:04	3–3
W. Wallén (I. Filppula, J. Dehner) – 37:01	4–3
J. Rita (H. Heino, R. Hahl) – 38:48	5–3
B. Eaves (I. Filppula, R. Hahl) – 39:29	6–3
N. Tuhkanen (I. Filppula, B. Eaves) – 58:14	7–3

10 min
Penalties
58 min
33
Shots
35

27 August 2011; 17:00	Luleå HF (Sweden)	5–2 (0–1, 3–0, 2–1)	(Sweden) Färjestad BK	Lombiahallen, Kiruna; Attendance: 2,026

Game reference

David Rautio
Goalies
Fredrik Pettersson-Wentzel
Referees:
Thomas Andersson
Patrik Sjöberg

	0–1	06:40 – (SH) A. Bastiansen
J. Vihko (V. Viitaluoma, S. Hjalmarsson) (PP) – 29:13	1–1
J. Berglund (J. Fransson, C. Abbott) – 30:14	2–1
J. Harju (N. Olausson) – 39:00	3–1
J. Harju (PP) – 41:36	4–1
	4–2	54:31 – P. Lundh
D. Fleury (J. Fransson, K. Karlsson) (ENG) – 58:45	5–2

6 min
Penalties
12 min
31
Shots
28

2 September 2011; 18:30	Tappara (Finland)	2–3 (0–0, 2–3, 0–0)	(Finland) HIFK	Expert Arena, Kotka; Attendance: 1,608

Game reference

Jani Nieminen
Goalies
Jan Lundell
Referees:
(Finland) Jani Luoma-Aho
(Finland) Teemu Salminen

	0–1	23:13 - T. Tallberg (M. Granlund, M. Granlund)
S. Venäläinen (J. Peltola, J. Makkonen) - 24:56	1–1
	1–2	32:58 - T. Järvinen (M. Kousa, P. Wirtanen)
J. Makkonen (S. Venäläinen, T. Mäntylä) - 37:12	2–2
	2–3	39:24 - M. Granlund (V. Peltonen)

4 min
Penalties
16 min
35
Shots
26

3 September 2011; 17:00	Sparta Praha (Czech Republic)	2–1 (1–0, 0–0, 1–1)	(Germany) Eisbären Berlin	Tesla Arena, Prague; Attendance: 1,901

Game reference

Tomáš Pöpperle
Goalies
Rob Zepp
Referees:
(Czech Republic) František Kalivoda
(Czech Republic) Štěpán Souček

P. Ton (P. Tenkrat) - 08:53	1–0
M. Sersen (T. Rachunek) - 53:39	2–0
	2–1	59:00 - J. Talbot (S. Felski)

39 min
Penalties
64 min
33
Shots
29

==== West Division vs. South Division ====
Time for the game played in Finland is UTC+3, while all times for the other games are UTC+2.

21 August 2011; 19:15	Red Bull Salzburg (Austria)	3–2 (0–1, 1–1, 2–0)	(Czech Republic) Kometa Brno	Eisarena Salzburg, Salzburg; Attendance: 1,100

Game reference

Josh Tordjman
Goalies
Sasu Hovi
Referees:
(Austria) Thomas Bernecker
(Austria) Christian Potocan

	0–1	03:41 – (PP) L. Čermák (P. Hubáček, R. Bičánek)
	0–2	23:28 – (PP) M. Holec (R. Erat)
T. Raffl (J. Williams, R. Abid) (PP) – 25:03	1–2
D. Welser (R. Earl, R. Abid) (PP) – 43:42	2–2
R. Earl (R. Abid) (SH) – 51:09	3–2

16 min
Penalties
30 min
30
Shots
45

22 August 2011; 18:00	Tappara (Finland)	5–6 GWS (3–0, 1–2, 1–3) (OT: 0–0) (SO: 0–1)	(Czech Republic) Pojišťovna Pardubice	Hakametsä Areena, Tampere; Attendance: 2,580

Game reference

Jani Nieminen
Goalies
Vladislav Koutský
Referees:
(Finland) Hannu Henriksson
(Finland) Jari Leppäalho

J. Leimu (J. Cepis, J. Peltola) – 04:56	1–0
S. Venäläinen (A. Erkinjuntti, J. Leimu) – 06:23	2–0
J. Leimu (T. Mäntylä, A. Erkinjuntti) – 15:44	3–0
	3–1	23:35 – T. Zohorna (V. Koci, M. Bartek)
	3–2	29:53 – P. Koukal
J. Tenute (P. Saravo, K. Strömberg) (PP) – 39:29	4–2
	4–3	48:33 – R. Kousal (L. Radil, V. Benák)
M. Männikkö (J. Leimu) (PP) – 50:53	5–3
	5–4	52:37 – (PP) J. Kolář (A. Píša, J. Kolář)
	5–5	56:58 – (PP) P. Koukal (J. Kolář, J. Stary)

M. Männikkö
S. Venäläinen
J. Tenute
Shootout
J. Stary
P. Koukal
M. Bartek
12 min
Penalties
16 min
27
Shots
38

28 August 2011; 14:00	Frölunda Indians (Sweden)	5–1 (1–0, 2–0, 2–1)	(Germany) Adler Mannheim	Frölunda Campus, Gothenburg; Attendance: 1,370

Game reference

Magnus Hellberg
Goalies
Felix Brückmann
Referees:
(Sweden) Marcus Vinnerborg
(Sweden) Sören Persson

T. Koivisto (M. Johansson, V. Svedberg) – 06:27	1–0
S. Collberg (J. Sundström, P. Johnsson) – 23:21	2–0
H. Tömmernes (C. Bäckman, M. Kahnberg) (PP) – 27:00	3–0
P. von Gunten (M. Olimb) (PP) – 48:59	4–0
	4–1	51:24 – (PP) M. Glumac (S. Wagner)
P. von Gunten (M. Olimb, P. Johnsson) (PP) – 57:23	5–1

10 min
Penalties
30 min
29
Shots
23

1 September 2011; 19:00	Färjestad BK (Sweden)	2–0 (0–0, 1–0, 1–0)	(Sweden) HV71	Åmåls Ishall, Åmål; Attendance: 786

Game reference
Cristopher Nihlstorp	Goalies	Daniel Larsson	Referees: (Sweden) Mikael Holm (Sweden) Sören Persson
R. Wallin (P. Åslund, Ch. Berglund) - 28:12 / 1–0; Marius Holtet (P. Wennerström) - 53:51 / 2–0			Referees: (Sweden) Mikael Holm (Sweden) Sören Persson
6 min	Penalties	10 min	Referees: (Sweden) Mikael Holm (Sweden) Sören Persson
29	Shots	17	Referees: (Sweden) Mikael Holm (Sweden) Sören Persson

4 September 2011; 16:00	Linköpings HC (Sweden)	4–1 (0–0, 2–1, 2–0)	(Finland) TPS	Woodyhallen, Katrineholm; Attendance: 637

Game reference

Fredrik Norrena
Goalies
Marek Schwarz
Referees:
(Sweden) Mikael Nord
(Sweden) David Bergman

M. Johansson (C. Söderberg, R. Figren) - 25:39	1–0
M. Johansson (J. Eriksson) - 35:15	2–0
	2–1	35:33 - M. Birner
P. Petterström (M. Håkansson, E. Lindhagen) - 40:20	3–1
R. Figren (M. Bäckman) - 42:16	4–1

18 min
Penalties
18 min
27
Shots
31

4 September 2011; 17:00	Bílí Tygři Liberec (Czech Republic)	4–5 (2–1, 1–3, 1–1)	(Germany) Eisbären Berlin	Tipsport Arena, Liberec; Attendance: 2,824

Game reference

Tomáš Vošvrda
Goalies
Kevin Nastiuk
Referees:
(Czech Republic) Martin Homola
(Czech Republic) Ján Hribik

M. Barta (T. Urban) - 10:30	1–0
D. Kajínek (D. Bortňák, D. Špaček) - 16:35	2–0
	2–1	20:00 - A. Rankel (T. J. Mulock)
	2–2	20:37 - A. Rankel (T.J. Mulock, J. Talbot)
	2–3	23:55 - S. Felski (A. Rankel)
T. Urban (D. Kajínek) - 26:00	3–3
	3–4	30:20 - T. Mulock (F. Hördler, M. Christensen)
Jan Holub (M. Pavlu, J. Kudrna) - 43:14	4–4
	4–5	53:48 - F. Hördler (A. Rankel)

22 min
Penalties
16 min
32
Shots
28

==== West Division vs. East Division ====
Time for the game played in Finland is UTC+3, while all times for the other games are UTC+2.

21 August 2011; 17:30	Eisbären Berlin (Germany)	4–2 (2–0, 0–0, 2–2)	(Slovakia) Slovan Bratislava	O2 World, Berlin; Attendance: 7,600

Game reference

Kevin Nastiuk
Goalies
Branislav Konrád
Referees:
(Germany) Georg Jakublov
(Germany) Jens Steinecke

T. J. Mulock (R. Regehr, S. Ustorf) – 12:51	1–0
T. J. Mulock (F. Busch, R. Regehr) – 15:16	2–0
	2–1	45:00 – (PP) J. Lipiansky (M. Hudec, R. Kukumberg)
T. J. Mulock (J. Talbot, F. Busch) (PP) – 46:42	3–1
D. Olver (B. Tallackson, R. Regehr) – 55:32	4–1
	4–2	57:49 – P. Sisovsky (R. Kukumberg, A. Kudrna)

42 min
Penalties
71 min
38
Shots
32

21 August 2011; 18:30	Oulun Kärpät (Finland)	2–1 GWS (0–0, 1–0, 0–1) (OT: 0–0) (SO: 1–0)	(Sweden) Färjestad BK	Kokkola Arena, Kokkola; Attendance: 1,992

Game reference
Ville Hostikka	Goalies	Cristopher Nihlstorp	Referees: (Finland) Timo Favorin (Finland) Anssi Salomäki
M. Vondrka (SH) – 30:46 / 1–0; / 1–1 / 55:37 – C. Berglund (P. Åslund, M. Nygren)			Referees: (Finland) Timo Favorin (Finland) Anssi Salomäki
M. Vondrka (miss); J. Donskoi (miss); J-P. Haataja	Shootout	(miss) P. Åslund; (miss) C. Berglund; (miss) R. Sterner	Referees: (Finland) Timo Favorin (Finland) Anssi Salomäki
18 min	Penalties	16 min	Referees: (Finland) Timo Favorin (Finland) Anssi Salomäki
37	Shots	35	Referees: (Finland) Timo Favorin (Finland) Anssi Salomäki

28 August 2011; 18:00	Plzeň 1929 (Czech Republic)	4–0 (1–0, 1–0, 2–0)	(Finland) Tappara	ČEZ Aréna, Plzeň; Attendance: 2,764

Game reference

Marek Mazanec
Goalies
Juha Metsola
Referees:
(Czech Republic) Vladimír Šindler
(Czech Republic) Roman Svoboda

T. Frolo (J. Hlinka) – 12:53	1–0
T. Vlasák (Radek Duda) (SH) – 39:59	2–0
J. Hlinka (O. Kratěna) – 54:51	3–0
J. Kovář (M. Straka) (ENG) – 58:20	4–0

10 min
Penalties
2 min
31
Shots
25

28 August 2011; 20:00	Vienna Capitals (Austria)	4–3 OT (1–3, 1–0, 1–0) (OT: 1–0)	(Finland) TPS	Albert Schultz Eishalle, Vienna; Attendance: 3,800

Game reference

Reinhard Divis
Goalies
Aleksis Ahlqvist
Referees:
(Austria) Robert Falkner
(Austria) Ladislav Smetana

	0–1	06:00 – M. Birner (G. Raboin)
	0–2	08:32 – (PP) R. Stone (J. Tuominen, T. Seppänen)
	0–3	13:38 – (PP) T. Plíhal (M. Anttila, V. Vahalahti)
J. Ferland (B. Gratton, D. Bjornlie) (PP) – 19:27	1–3
J. Ferland (B. Gratton, D. Bjornlie) (PP2) – 27:22	2–3
R. Lupaschuk (B. Gratton, F. Gunnarsson) (PP) – 46:11	3–3
D. Bjornlie (J. Ferland, B. Gratton) (PP) – 60:42	4–3

16 min
Penalties
24 min
28
Shots
19

1 September 2011; 19:15	Red Bull Salzburg (Austria)	4–6 (2–2, 0–1, 2–3)	(Czech Republic) České Budějovice	Eisarena Salzburg, Salzburg; Attendance: 1,524

Game reference

Josh Tordjman
Goalies
Jakub Kovář
Referees:
(Austria) Wolfgang Fussi
(Austria) Christian Potocan

	0–1	01:08 - M. Podlesak (M. Gulas)
S. Regier (B. Aubin, R. Abid) - 04:26	1–1
	1–2	15:39 - P. Kasparik (J. Simanek, R. Martynek)
M. Trattnig (R. Abid) - 16:26	2–2
	2–3	23:56 - P. Kasparik (R. Vrablik)
D. Lynch (T. Raffl, D. Heinrich) - 44:35	3–3
	3–4	45:04 - R. Martynek (M. Mikeska, P. Sailer)
	3–5	52:07 - M. Gulas
D. Bois (R. Abid) - 57:48	4–5
	4–6	58:14 - M. Gulas

16 min
Penalties
14 min
40
Shots
36

3 September 2011; 16:00	Frölunda Indians (Sweden)	5–2 (2–0, 1–2, 2–0)	(Finland) KalPa	Kungsbacka Ishall, Kungsbacka; Attendance: 1,357

Game reference

Frederik Andersen
Goalies
Juha Toivonen
Referees:
(Sweden) Morgan Johansson
(Sweden) Mikael Holm

T. Kovisto (N. Lasu, M. Johansson) - 02:39	1–0
M. Olimb (F. Pettersson) - 15:46	2–0
Ch. Bäckman (J. Tolsa, M. Kahnberg) - 21:17	3–0
	3–1	24:12 - J. Hentonen (S. Salminen)
	3–2	39:15 - S. Kapanen (Th. Kiiskinen, M. Kuparinen)
F. Pettersson (M. Pyörälä) - 40:16	4–2
M. Olimb (F. Pettersson, Ch. Bäckman) - 54:01	5–2

12 min
Penalties
16 min
11
Shots
37

==== North Division vs. South Division ====
All times are local (UTC+2).

11 August 2011; 18:30	Sparta Praha (Czech Republic)	1–4 (0–0, 0–3, 1–1)	(Sweden) HV71	Tesla Arena, Prague; Attendance: 778

Game reference

Tomáš Pöpperle
Goalies
Daniel Larsson
Referees:
(Czech Republic) Jakub Smitka
(Czech Republic) Štěpán Souček

	0–1	21:20 – P. Ledin (O. Sundh)
	0–2	33:34 – (PP) J. Thörnberg (J. Voutilainen, M. Trygg)
	0–3	38:13 – N. Welch (A. Falk, J. Lindström)
	0–4	51:08 – (PP) J. Fasth (N. Welch)
M. Broš – 51:17	1–4

8 min
Penalties
16 min
31
Shots
19

28 August 2011; 18:00	Kometa Brno (Czech Republic)	0–3 (0–0, 0–1, 0–2)	(Finland) Jokerit	Hala Rondo, Brno; Attendance: 4,178

Game reference

Sasu Hovi
Goalies
Zoltán Hetényi
Referees:
(Czech Republic) Milan Minář
(Czech Republic) Radek Husička

0–1	26:54 – T. Mäki (T. Pulkkinen)
0–2	49:07 – T. Teräväinen (J. Rita)
0–3	58:00 – A. Ruuttu (T. Pulkkinen)

12 min
Penalties
6 min
24
Shots
28

28 August 2011; 19:30	Pojišťovna Pardubice (Czech Republic)	2–1 (1–0, 1–0, 0–1)	(Finland) HIFK	ČEZ Aréna, Pardubice; Attendance: 4,127

Game reference

Vladislav Koutský
Goalies
Juuso Riksman
Referees:
(Czech Republic) Martin Homola
(Czech Republic) Jan Hribik

M. Bartek (C. Elkins, V. Koci) (EV) – 13:27	1–0
J. Stary (M. Bartek, V. Sicak) (PP) – 25:12	2–0
	2–1	46:55 – Ma. Granlund (K. Tuohilampi)

18 min
Penalties
18 min
26
Shots
28

3 September 2011; 16:00	Linköpings HC (Sweden)	3–2 (0–0, 1–1, 2–1)	(Sweden) Djurgårdens IF	VMP Group Arena, Mjölby; Attendance: 837

Game reference

Christian Engstrand
Goalies
Gustaf Wesslau
Referees:
(Sweden) Christer Lärking
(Sweden) Ulf Rönnmark

	0–1	20:06 - M. Nilsson
M. Håkanson (J. Åkerman) - 32:14	1–1
M. Håkanson - 51:00	2–1
E. Lindhagen - 58:58	3–1
	3–2	?

16 min
Penalties
10 min
27
Shots
37

3 September 2011; 19:00	Bílí Tygři Liberec (Czech Republic)	2–3 (0–0, 0–2, 2–1)	(Sweden) Luleå HF	Tipsport Arena, Liberec; Attendance: 1,556

Game reference

Marek Pinc
Goalies
David Rautio
Referees:
(Czech Republic) Ján Hribik
(Czech Republic) Martin Fraňo

	0–1	20:53 - J. Harju (S. Hjalmarsson)
	0–2	24:50 - C. Abbott (D. Fleury)
	0–3	46:33 - S. Hjalmarsson (C. Abbott, J. Harju)
M. Bulir - 48:21	1–3
D. Stich (P. Nedvěd) - 48:48	2–3

35 min
Penalties
20 min
28
Shots
26

4 September 2011; 18:00	Adler Mannheim (Germany)	3–5 (2–2, 0–3, 1–0)	(Czech Republic) Slavia Praha	SAP Arena, Mannheim; Attendance: 7,674

Game reference

Felix Brückmann
Goalies
Miroslav Kopřiva
Referee:
(Germany) Marcus Brill

	0–1	13:45 - T. Svoboda (M. Tomica, P. Kubos)
K. Magowan (Y. Lehoux, C. Lee) (PP) - 15:44	1–1
M. Glumac (PP) - 17:19	2–1
	2–2	17:28 - (PP) V. Ruzicka (M. Tomica, T. Svoboda)
	2–3	20:51 - J. Sklenar (P. Kadlec)
	2–4	26:34 - T. Svoboda (J. Vasicek, V. Ruzicka)
	2–5	39:25 - (PP) T. Svoboda (M. Tomica, V. Ruzicka)
A. Mitchell (Y. Lehoux, Ch. Ullmann) (PP) - 43:47	3–5

133 min
Penalties
137 min
36
Shots
28

==== North Division vs. East Division ====
All times for the games played in Finland are UTC+3, while all times for the other games are UTC+2.

23 August 2011; 18:30	KalPa (Finland)	3–1 (1–0, 1–0, 1–1)	(Sweden) Djurgårdens IF	Kuopion Jäähalli, Kuopio; Attendance: 3,283

Game reference

Ari Ahonen
Goalies
Gustaf Wesslau
Referees:
(Finland) Jyri Rönn
(Finland) Antti Hämäläinen

H. Laurila (J. Rissanen, O. Saarinen) (PP) – 13:19	1–0
I. Pakarinen (S. Kapanen, M. Kuparinen) – 31:48	2–0
	2–1	46:53 – P. Cehlin (S. Lassen)
J. Hentunen (S. Kapanen) (ENG) – 59:27	3–1

10 min
Penalties
10 min
24
Shots
19

25 August 2011; 19:00	Luleå HF (Sweden)	6–5 GWS (1–2, 3–1, 1–2) (OT: 0–0) (SO: 1–0)	(Finland) Oulun Kärpät	Coop Norrbotten Arena, Luleå; Attendance: 3,085

Game reference

David Rautio
Goalies
Tomi Karhunen
Referees:
(Sweden) Tobias Forsström
(Sweden) Tobias Björk

	0–1	12:01 – M. Salomäki (M. Lehtonen, O. Eklund)
	0–2	12:31 – J. Kemppainen (J-P. Haataja)
J. Harju (J. Fransson) – 15:12	1–2
S. Enterfeldt (K. Komarek) – 23:18	2–2
J. Vihko (J. Harju, V. Viitaluoma) (PP) – 31:14	3–2
	3–3	35:15 – M. Salomäki (V. Mäntymaa)
S. Enterfeldt (K. Komarek, K. Karlsson) – 39:43	4–3
	4–4	43:14 – K. Koskenkorva
	4–5	48:11 – M. Salomäki (M. Vondrka)
J. Harju (PEN) – 55:45	5–5

J. Harju
S. Enterfeldt
N. Olausson
M. Persson
Shootout
J. Donskoi
M. Salomäki
J. Viuhkola
J-P. Haataja
6 min
Penalties
10 min
36
Shots
19

31 August 2011; 17:30	Slavia Praha (Czech Republic)	3–5 (0–1, 1–1, 2–3)	(Czech Republic) Plzeň 1929	Eden Arena, Prague; Attendance: 868

Game reference

Miroslav Kopřiva
Goalies
Adam Svoboda
Referees:
(Czech Republic) Miroslav Jebavý
(Czech Republic) Todd Lacina

	0–1	07:54 - J. Hlinka (P. Mrna, O. Kratena)
P. Kadlec (J. Vasicek, T. Kurka) - 21:13	1–1
	1–2	37:24 - P. Sykora (M. Straka, R. Duda)
V. Ruzicka (P. Kadlec, J. Krejcik) - 40:52	2–2
T. Kurka (P. Kadlec, T. Svoboda) - 49:20	3–2
	3–3	52:58 - P. Sykora (M. Straka, T. Vlasak)
	3–4	53:31 - P. Mrna (J. Hlinka, O. Kratena)
	3–5	55:13 - O. Kratena (J. Hlinka)

12 min
Penalties
24 min
29
Shots
25

3 September 2011; 17:00	HIFK (Finland)	2–4 (1–1, 0–3, 1–0)	(Austria) Vienna Capitals	Elisa Areena, Helsinki; Attendance: 800

Game reference

Juuso Riksman
Goalies
Reinhard Divis
Referees:
(Finland) Mikko Kaukokari
(Finland) Tom Laaksonen

M. Tuomainen (V. Peltonen) - 12:10	1–0
	1–1	14:00 - P. Kavanagh (R. Rotter)
	1–2	30:04 - M. Fischer (J. Ferland)
	1–3	32:28 - F. Gunnarsson (H. Kavanagh)
	1–4	38:23 - B. Gratton (J. Ferland)
R. Nyholm (E. Pöysti) - 41:10	2–4

55 min
Penalties
104 min
46
Shots
26

3 September 2011; 17:00	Jokerit (Finland)	7–2 (1–1, 3–0, 3–1)	(Slovakia) Slovan Bratislava	Tikkurilan Valtti Areena, Vantaa; Attendance: 1,638

Game reference

Eero Kilpeläinen
Goalies
Branislav Konrád
Referees:
(Finland) Jukka Hakkarainen
(Finland) Mikko Vanninen

T. Pulkkinen (J. Lahti, A. Kerälä) - 08:23	1–0
	1–1	14:28 - (PP) T. Bulik (M. Stajnoch)
N. Hardt (I. Filppula, B. Eaves) - 33:49	2–1
Jeremy Dehner (I. Filppula, B. Eaves) - 36:04	3–1
J. Rita (R. Hahl, O. Väänänen) - 39:21	4–1
T. Mäki (J. Dehner, M. Nordlund) - 42:30	5–1
A.-J. Niemi (I. Filppula, B. Eaves) - 46:08	6–1
	6–2	52:23 - P. Sisovsky (I. Datelinka, J. Ciger)
Ossi Väänänen (A. Kerälä, T. Pulkkinen) - 59:19	7–2

6 min
Penalties
12 min
41
Shots
24

6 September 2011; 17:30	České Budějovice (Czech Republic)	4–3 GWS (1–1, 0–1, 2–1) (OT: 0–0) (SO: 1–0)	(Czech Republic) Sparta Praha	Budvar Arena, České Budějovice; Attendance: 1,880

Game reference

Jakub Kovář
Goalies
Martin Falter
Referees:
(Czech Republic) Jiří Dvořák
(Czech Republic) Petr Lacina

	0–1	02:46 - S. Treille (J. Kasik)
J. Langhammer (L. Kveton) - 17:55	1–1
	1–2	32:04 - S. Treille
	1–3	47:38 - P. Jansky (M. Ask)
M. Gulas (R. Vydareny, L. Kveton) - 56:20	2–3
J. Simanek (P. Kasparik, R. Martynek) - 56:53	3–3

R. Martynek
M. Gulas
Shootout
Y. Treille
P. Tenkrat
12 min
Penalties
48 min
45
Shots
36

==== South Division vs. East Division ====
Time for the game played in Finland is UTC+3, while all times for the other games are UTC+2.

14 August 2011; 18:00	Slovan Bratislava (Slovakia)	3–0 (0–0, 0–0, 3–0)	(Sweden) Linköpings HC	Slovnaft Arena, Bratislava; Attendance: 4,639

Game reference

Branislav Konrád
Goalies
Fredrik Norrena
Referees:
(Slovakia) Vladimír Baluška
(Slovakia) Peter Jonák

P. Frühauf (R. Kukumberg, M. Hudec) – 43:26	1–0
L. Hudacek (M. Macho) – 46:22	2–0
D. Skokan – 51:37	3–0

16 min
Penalties
8 min
30
Shots
40

14 August 2011; 20:00	Vienna Capitals (Austria)	3–6 (1–0, 2–4, 0–2)	(Germany) Adler Mannheim	Albert Schultz Eishalle, Vienna; Attendance: 4,700

Game reference

Sebastian Stefaniszin
Goalies
Fred Brathwaite
Referees:
(Germany) Ladislav Smetana
(Germany) Georg Veit

F. Fortier (B. Gratton, J. Ferland) (PP) – 08:07	1–0
	1–1	21:08 – K. Magowan (A. Mitchell, Y. Lehoux)
	1–2	25:58 – (PP) Y. Seidenberg (Y. Lehoux, J. Sifers)
J. Ferland (M. Rodman, F. Gunnarsson) – 31:08	2–2
	2–3	31:55 – C. Ullmann (R. Arendt, F. Mauer)
	2–4	34:57 – (SH) C. Lee (Y. Seidenberg)
F. Gunnarsson (R. Rotter, P. Casparsson) (PP) – 37:13	3–4
	3–5	44:55 – Y. Lehoux (K. Magowan, A. Mitchell)
	3–6	55:47 – (ENG) A. Mitchell (C. Lee, Y. Lehoux)

16 min
Penalties
63 min
41
Shots
33

28 August 2011; 17:00	Oulun Kärpät (Finland)	4–1 (0–0, 2–0, 2–1)	(Czech Republic) Bílí Tygři Liberec	Raahe Arena, Raahe; Attendance: 1,027

Game reference

Ville Hostikka
Goalies
Tomáš Vošvrda
Referees:
(Finland) Vesa Keränen
(Finland) Tuomo Sorakangas

V. Mäntymaa (J. Viuhkola, J. Donskoi (PP) – 25:29	1–0
M. Salomäki (J. Viuhkola, V. Mäntymaa) – 33:03	2–0
I. Mikkola (J-P. Haataja, O. Eklund) (PP) – 41:21	3–0
	3–1	43:17 – T. Klimenta (J. Víšek, T. Urban)
P. Saarenheimo (V. Pokka, J. Komulainen) – 52:06	4–1

10 min
Penalties
12 min
23
Shots
35

3 September 2011; 19:35	Kometa Brno (Czech Republic)	1–3 (0–1, 0–2, 1–0)	(Czech Republic) České Budějovice	Hala Rondo, Brno; Attendance: 2,053

Game reference

Sasu Hovi
Goalies
Jakub Kovář
Referees:
(Czech Republic) Jiří Hradil
(Czech Republic) Kubinčík

	0–1	18:03 - M. Gulaš (M. Kolarz)
	0–2	31:13 - J. Langhammer (R. Pšurný, M. Gulaš)
	0–3	36:14- S. Polodna (M. Mikeska, P. Mikuš)
B. Jankovič (H. Zohorna) - 57:47	1–3

24 min
Penalties
22 min
26
Shots
45

4 September 2011; 16:00	HV71 (Sweden)	0–4 (0–2, 0–0, 0–2)	(Finland) KalPa	Gislerinken, Gislaved; Attendance: 759

Game reference

Andreas Andersson
Goalies
Ari Ahonen
Referees:
(Sweden) Niclas Johansson
(Sweden) Mikael Sjökvist

0–1	08:57 -H. Laurila (T. Kisskinen)
0–2	12:26 - H. Laurila (T. Kisskinen)
0–3	52:16 -J. Junnila (H. Ikonen, J. Ikonen)
0–4	59:03 - J. Junnila

20 min
Penalties
20 min
31
Shots
34

6 September 2011; 18:00	Plzeň 1929 (Czech Republic)	4–3 (2–1, 0–1, 2–1)	(Czech Republic) Pojišťovna Pardubice	ČEZ Aréna, Plzeň; Attendance: 2,071

Game reference

Adam Svoboda
Goalies
Martin Růžička
Referees:
(Czech Republic) Vladimir Šindler
(Czech Republic) Ján Svoboda

P. Petruška - 08:27	1–0
T. Pitule (M. Dvořák) - 08:57	2–0
	2–1	11:49 - R. Somík (M. Barek)
	2–2	37:34 - V. Benák
T. Vlasák (M. Straka, P. Petruška) - 45:55	3–2
	3–3	49:42 - J. Starý (P. Koukal, V. Kočí)
R. Duda (P. Sýkora, T. Vlasák) - 53:40	4–3

6 min
Penalties
8 min
41
Shots
28

== Playoffs ==
The playoffs are played as the Red Bulls Salute and take place in Salzburg and Vienna between 16–18 December 2011. The teams that lose the quarterfinals play in the classification games. The classification games decide which teams play in the respective games for 7th place and 5th place.

=== Venues ===
Salzburg	Host cities of the 2011 Red Bulls Salute in Austria	Vienna
Eisarena Salzburg	Host cities of the 2011 Red Bulls Salute in Austria	Albert Schultz Eishalle
Capacity: 3 200	Host cities of the 2011 Red Bulls Salute in Austria	Capacity: 7 000

=== Bracket ===
Quarterfinals
W1	(Sweden) Frölunda Indians	2
S2	(Sweden) Linköpings HC	4
S1	(Czech Republic) Pojišťovna Pardubice	1
W2	(Austria) Red Bull Salzburg	2
N1	(Finland) Jokerit	7
E2	(Czech Republic) České Budějovice	2
E1	(Czech Republic) Plzeň 1929	1
N2	(Sweden) Luleå HF	2

Semifinals
QF1	(Sweden) Linköpings HC	3
QF2	(Austria) Red Bull Salzburg	4
QF3	(Finland) Jokerit	3
QF4	(Sweden) Luleå HF	2

Finals
SF1	(Austria) Red Bull Salzburg	3
SF2	(Finland) Jokerit	2
Bronze medal game
SF1	(Sweden) Linköpings HC	2
SF2	(Sweden) Luleå HF	3

=== Quarterfinals ===
All times are local (UTC+1).

16 December 2011; 17:15	Frölunda Indians (Sweden)	2–4 (1–0, 0–3, 1–1)	(Sweden) Linköpings HC	Eisarena Salzburg, Salzburg; Attendance: 890

Game reference

Referees:
(Czech Republic) Jan Hribik
(Czech Republic) Antonin Jeřábek

H. Tömmernes (C. Persson, F. Pettersson) – 14:48	1–0
	1–1	Mark Hartigan (A. Jämtin, M. Johansson) – 34:01
	1–2	A. Jämtin (M. Hartigan) – 36:40
	1–3	M. Hartigan (K. Dahlbeck) – 37:58
	1–4	E. Lindhagen (J. Hlinka, M. Johansson) (PP) – 45:03
M. Olimb (F. Pettersson) – 56:05	2–4

8 min
Penalties
14 min
45
Shots
30

16 December 2011; 17:15	Jokerit (Finland)	7–2 (2–1, 3–0, 2–1)	(Czech Republic) České Budějovice	Albert Schultz Eishalle, Vienna; Attendance: 1,200

Game reference

Referees:
(Sweden) Thomas Andersson
(Sweden) Patrik Sjöberg

B. Eaves (A. Niemi, N. Hardt) – 04:33	1–0
	1–1	06:55 – J. Šimánek (P. Kašpařík, T. Mertl)
A. Kerälä (T. Pulkkinen) – 08:21	2–1
J.Lahti (T. Pulkkinen) – 22:15	3–1
N. Hardt (B. Eaves, I. Filppula) – 27:42	4–1
A. Kerälä (J. Lahti) – 28:32	5–1
J. Rita (I. Filppula, A. Niemi) – 53:02	6–1
N. Hardt – 56:58	7–1
	7–2	58:27 – R. Martynek (P. Kašpařík, J. Šimánek)

4 min
Penalties
8 min
30
Shots
23

16 December 2011; 20:30	Pojišťovna Pardubice (Czech Republic)	1–2 (0–0, 1–2, 0–0)	(Austria) Red Bull Salzburg	Eisarena Salzburg, Salzburg; Attendance: 1,580

Game reference

Referees:
(Finland) Antti Boman
(Finland) Jari Lepaalho

	0–1	J. Williams (R. Glenn) – 34:19
P. Koukal (J. Starý) – 37:49	1–1
	1–2	T. Redenbach (M. Schlacher) – 38:34

18 min
Penalties
16 min
47
Shots
33

16 December 2011; 20:30	Plzeň 1929 (Czech Republic)	1–2 GWS (0–0, 0–1, 1–0) (OT: 0–0) (SO: 0–1)	(Sweden) Luleå HF	Albert Schultz Eishalle, Vienna; Attendance: 1,000

Game reference
			Referees: (Austria) Thomas Bernecker (Austria) Florian Zehetleitner
/ 0–1 / 34:12 – T. Koivisto (J. Vihko, V. Viitaluoma); J. Kovář (R.Duda) – 44:57 / 1–1			Referees: (Austria) Thomas Bernecker (Austria) Florian Zehetleitner
M.Straka; R. Duda	Shootout	T. Koivisto; J. Harju; M. Persson	Referees: (Austria) Thomas Bernecker (Austria) Florian Zehetleitner
10 min	Penalties	6 min	Referees: (Austria) Thomas Bernecker (Austria) Florian Zehetleitner
27	Shots	30	Referees: (Austria) Thomas Bernecker (Austria) Florian Zehetleitner

=== Classification games ===
All times are local (UTC+1).

17 December 2011; 17:15	Frölunda Indians (Sweden)	4–5 (1–1, 1–4, 2–0)	(Czech Republic) Pojišťovna Pardubice	Eisarena Salzburg, Salzburg; Attendance: 420

Game reference
			Referees: (Finland) Antti Boman (Finland) Jari Lepaalho
8 min	Penalties	16 min	Referees: (Finland) Antti Boman (Finland) Jari Lepaalho
34	Shots	28	Referees: (Finland) Antti Boman (Finland) Jari Lepaalho

17 December 2011; 20:30	České Budějovice (Czech Republic)	4–5 GWS (2–0, 1–2, 1–2) (OT: 0–0) (SO: 0–1)	(Czech Republic) Plzeň 1929	Albert Schultz Eishalle, Vienna; Attendance: 1,000

Game reference
			Referees: (Sweden) Thomas Andersson (Sweden) Patrik Sjöberg
12 min	Penalties	8 min	Referees: (Sweden) Thomas Andersson (Sweden) Patrik Sjöberg
23	Shots	38	Referees: (Sweden) Thomas Andersson (Sweden) Patrik Sjöberg

=== Semifinals ===
All times are local (UTC+1).

17 December 2011; 17:15	Jokerit (Finland)	3–2 OT (0–1, 2–0, 0–1) (OT: 1–0)	(Sweden) Luleå HF	Albert Schultz Eishalle, Vienna; Attendance: 1,000

Game reference

Referees:
(Austria) Thomas Bernecker
(Austria) Florian Zehetleitner

	0–1	13:38 – (PP) S. Hjalmarsson (E. Fälth)
O. Väänänen (T. Eronen, I. Filppula) (PP) – 36:40	1–1
J. Ruutu – 39:12	2–1
	2–2	47:04 – V. Viitaluoma (J. Vihko, T. Koivisto)
M. Nordlund (J. Dehner, A. Kerälä) – 64:00	3–2

4 min
Penalties
6 min
30
Shots
26

17 December 2011; 20:30	Linköpings HC (Sweden)	3–4 GWS (1–0, 1–3, 1–0) (OT: 0–0) (SO: 0–1)	(Austria) Red Bull Salzburg	Eisarena Salzburg, Salzburg; Attendance: 1,460

Game reference
			Referees: (Czech Republic) Jan Hribík (Czech Republic) Antonín Jeřábek
18 min	Penalties	28 min	Referees: (Czech Republic) Jan Hribík (Czech Republic) Antonín Jeřábek
40	Shots	38	Referees: (Czech Republic) Jan Hribík (Czech Republic) Antonín Jeřábek

=== 7th place game ===
Time is local (UTC+1).

18 December 2011; 14:00	Frölunda HC (Sweden)	4–2 (2–1, 1–0, 1–1)	(Czech Republic) České Budějovice	Eisarena Salzburg, Salzburg; Attendance: 280

Game reference
Referees: (Finland) Antti Boman (Finland) Jari Lepaalho

=== 5th place game ===
Time is local (UTC+1).

18 December 2011; 17:15	Pojišťovna Pardubice (Czech Republic)	5–3 (2–1, 3–0, 0–2)	(Czech Republic) Plzeň 1929	Eisarena Salzburg, Salzburg; Attendance: 490

Game reference
Referees: (Czech Republic) Jan Hribík (Czech Republic) Antonín Jeřábek

=== Bronze medal game ===
Time is local (UTC+1).

18 December 2011; 17:15	Luleå HF (Sweden)	3–2 OT (0–1, 1–1, 1–0) (OT: 1–0)	(Sweden) Linköpings HC	Albert Schultz Eishalle, Vienna; Attendance: 1,200

Game reference
Referees: (Austria) Thomas Bernecker (Austria) Florian Zehetleitner

=== Gold medal game ===
Time is local (UTC+1).

18 December 2011; 20:30	Jokerit (Finland)	2–3 (1–0, 1–1, 0–2)	(Austria) Red Bull Salzburg	Albert Schultz Eishalle, Vienna; Attendance: 3,200

Game reference

Referees:
(Sweden) Thomas Andersson
(Sweden) Patrik Sjöberg

N. Hardt (I. Filppula) - 0.10	1-0
2-0 J. Ruutu (N. Hardt) (PP) - 26.56	2-0
	2-1	33.10 - (PP) D. Bois (R. Abid, R. Glenn)
	2-2	41.11 - D. Bois (S. Regier, B. Aubin)
	2-3	47.34 - A. Aliu (M. Schiechl)

== Ranking and statistics ==
=== Final standings ===
The final standings of the tournament:

Gold medal	(Austria) Red Bull Salzburg
Silver medal	(Finland) Jokerit
Bronze medal	(Sweden) Luleå HF
4	(Sweden) Linköpings HC
5	(Czech Republic) Pojišťovna Pardubice
6	(Czech Republic) Plzeň 1929
7	(Sweden) Frölunda HC
8	(Czech Republic) České Budějovice

=== Scoring leaders ===
List shows the top skaters sorted by points, then goals. If the list exceeds 10 skaters because of a tie in points, all of the tied skaters are shown.

Player	Team	GP	G	A	Pts	PIM	POS
(Finland) Ilari Filppula	Jokerit	11	3	13	16	2	F
(United States) Ben Eaves	Jokerit	11	7	6	13	2	F
(Canada) Ramzi Abid	Red Bull Salzburg	11	2	11	13	45	F
(Norway) Mathis Olimb	Frölunda Indians	10	3	9	12	8	F
(Canada) Danny Bois	Red Bull Salzburg	11	5	6	11	37	F
(Canada) Benoît Gratton	Vienna Capitals	8	2	9	11	50	F
(Czech Republic) Martin Straka	Plzeň 1929	10	0	11	11	0	F
(Czech Republic) Tomáš Vlasák	Plzeň 1929	10	8	2	10	2	F
(Sweden) Magnus Kahnberg	Frölunda Indians	8	4	6	10	4	F
(Sweden) Fredrik Pettersson	Frölunda Indians	8	4	6	10	8	F

GP = Games played; G = Goals; A = Assists; Pts = Points; PIM = Penalties in minutes; POS = Position
positions: F = Forward; D = Defenceman

Sources: Europeantrophy.com and Eurohockey.com
Updated as of the end of the tournament.

=== Leading goaltenders ===
Only the top five goaltenders, based on save percentage, who have played 40% of their team's minutes, are included in this list.

Player	Team	TOI	SA	GA	GAA	Sv%	SO
(Finland) Ville Hostikka	Oulun Kärpät	255:00	140	8	1.88	94.29	0
(Czech Republic) Marek Schwarz	TPS	243:17	99	6	1.48	93.94	1
(Slovakia) Branislav Konrád	Slovan Bratislava	474:09	300	19	2.40	93.67	1
(Sweden) Daniel Larsson	HV71	213:33	110	7	1.97	93.64	1
(Czech Republic) Jakub Kovář	České Budějovice	492:54	235	15	1.83	93.62	1

TOI = Time on ice (minutes:seconds); SA = Shots against; GA = Goals against; GAA = Goals against average; Sv% = Save percentage; SO = Shutouts

Sources: Europeantrophy.com and Eurohockey.com
Updated as of the end of the tournament.

=== European Star Award leaders ===
The European Star Award is a three stars award given to the three best players in each game. The first star gets three points, the second gets two points, and the third gets one point. List shows the top ten players based on the number of European Star Award points.

Player	Team	GP	Pts	POS
(Slovakia) Branislav Konrád	Slovan Bratislava	8	11	G
(United States) Ben Eaves	Jokerit	11	11	F
(Czech Republic) Adam Svoboda	Plzeň 1929	9	10	G
(Czech Republic) Jakub Kovář	České Budějovice	10	10	G
(Finland) Ilari Filppula	Jokerit	11	10	F
(Czech Republic) Martin Růžička	Pojišťovna Pardubice	6	8	G
(Canada) Josh Tordjman	Red Bull Salzburg	7	8	G
(Canada) Benoît Gratton	Vienna Capitals	8	8	F
(Finland) Mikael Granlund	HIFK	8	7	F
(Czech Republic) Jaroslav Hlinka	Plzeň 1929	8	7	F

GP = Games played; Pts = Points; POS = Position
positions: G = Goaltender; F = Forward; D = Defenceman

Source: Europeantrophy.com
Updated as of the end of the tournament.

== Broadcasting rights ==
Country	Broadcaster	HD (High Definition)
Czech Republic	ČT4	ČT HD
Slovakia	Huste.tv	
Sweden	Viasat Hockey	Viasat Sport HD
Sweden	TV10	
