= Tuomas Suominen =

Finnish ice hockey player

- Born: January 17, 1984 (age 41); Turku, Finland
- Height: 5 ft 10 in (178 cm)
- Weight: 203 lb (92 kg; 14 st 7 lb)
- Position: Forward
- Shoots: Right
- Liiga team: HC TPS
- NHL draft: Undrafted
- Playing career: 2005–present

Tuomas Suominen (born January 17, 1984) is a Finnish ice hockey player. He is currently playing with HC TPS in the Finnish Liiga.

Suominen made his SM-liiga debut playing with HC TPS during the 2004–05 season.
