= Branislav Jankovič =

Slovak ice hockey player

- Born: 11 April 1991 (age 35) Trnava, Czechoslovakia
- Height: 5 ft 11 in (180 cm)
- Weight: 172 lb (78 kg; 12 st 4 lb)
- Position: Forward
- Shot: Left
- Played for: HC Kometa Brno; HC '05 Banská Bystrica; HK 36 Skalica
- Playing career: 2011–2015

Branislav Jankovič (born 11 April 1991) is a Slovak former professional ice hockey player. He played in the Czech Extraliga with HC Kometa Brno and in the Slovak Extraliga for HC '05 Banská Bystrica and HK 36 Skalica.
