= Tomi Körkkö =

Finnish ice hockey player

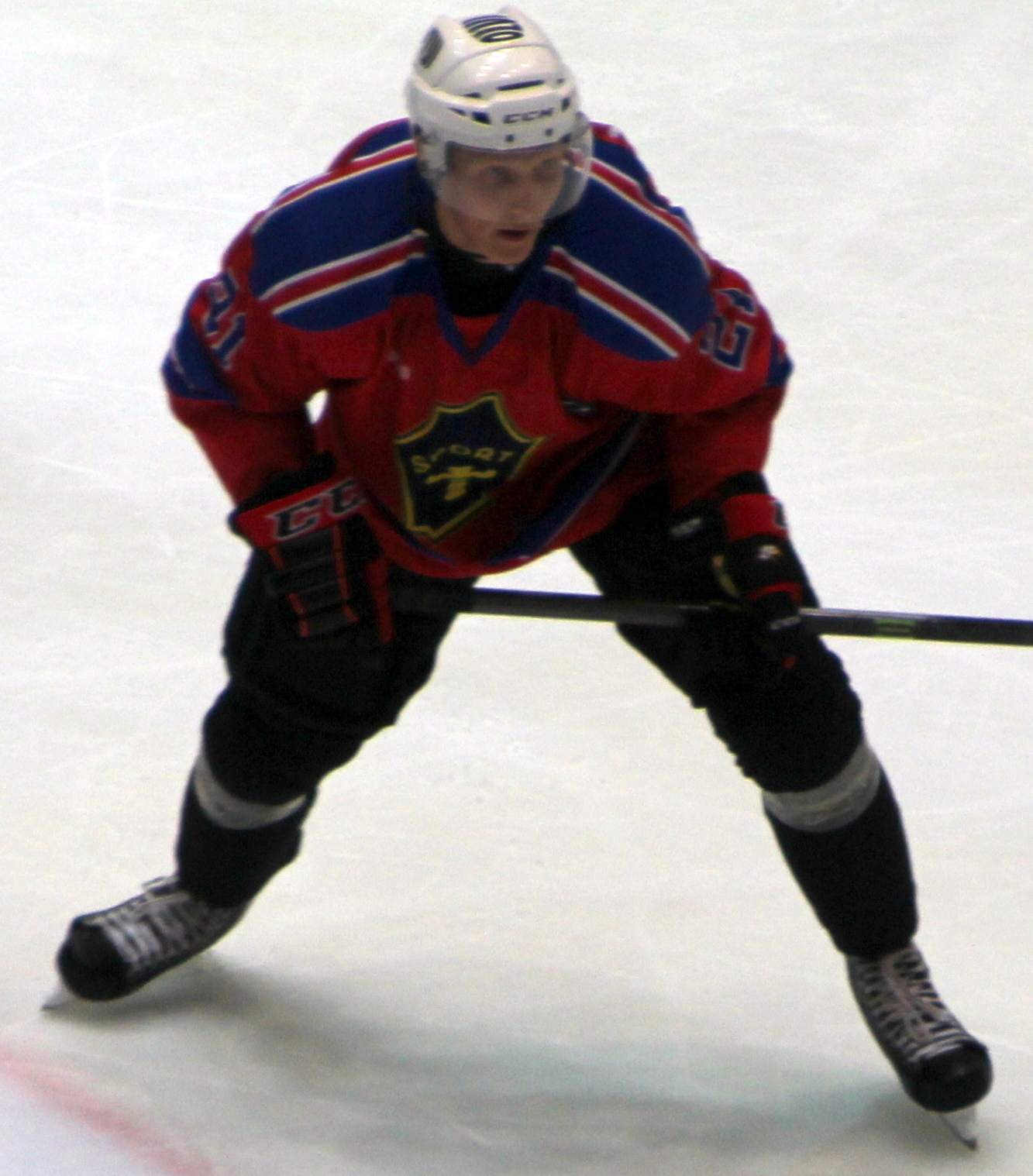
- Born: 26 March 1991 (age 33); Oulu, Finland
- Height: 6 ft 0 in (183 cm)
- Weight: 163 lb (74 kg; 11 st 9 lb)
- Position: Forward
- Shoots: Left
- SM-liiga team: Sport
- NHL draft: Undrafted
- Playing career: 2010–present

Tomi Körkkö (born 26 March 1991) is a Finnish professional ice hockey player who is currently playing for Vaasan Sport in the Liiga.
