= Jan Lundell =

Finnish ice hockey player

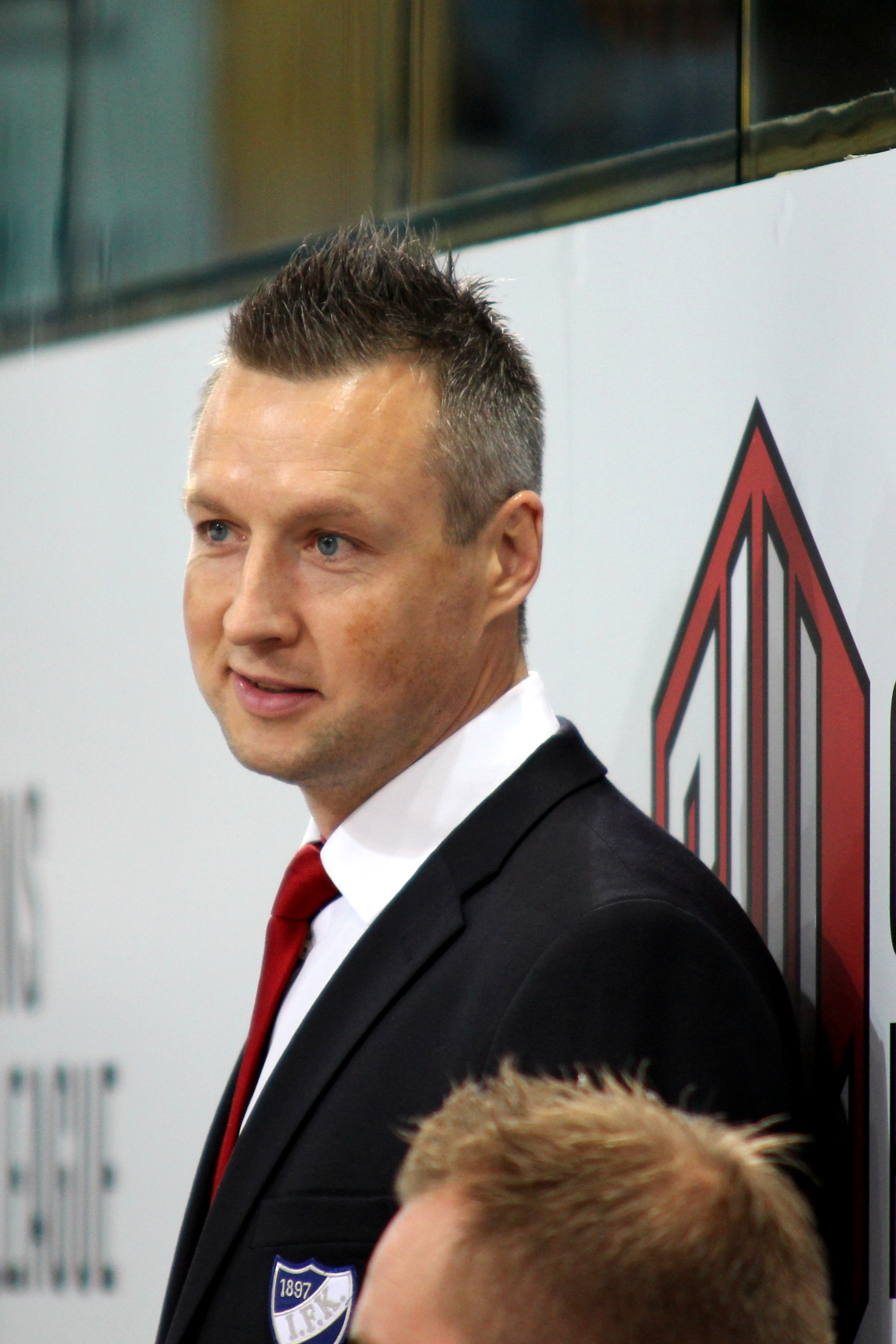
- Born: November 26, 1973 (age 52) Helsinki, Finland
- Height: 6 ft 3 in (191 cm)
- Weight: 194 lb (88 kg; 13 st 12 lb)
- Position: Goaltender
- Caught: Left
- SM-liiga team Former teams: HIFK; TPS; Frölunda HC; Pelicans; Augsburger Panther; HPK; Ässät; Lukko; Rødovre Mighty Bulls
- National team: Finland
- Playing career: 1996–2012

Jan Lundell (born November 26, 1973) is a Finnish retired ice hockey goaltender who last played in IFK Helsinki of Liiga. He is currently the goaltending coach for IFK Helsinki.

Lundell holds the record of being the oldest to play in a Liiga game at 46 years old, after a brief return on 9 January 2020 when Atte Engren, the second goaltender, fell sick shortly before the game against SaiPa.
