= Patrik Petruška =

Czech ice hockey player

- Born: July 31, 1991 (age 33); Plzeň, Czechoslovakia
- Height: 5 ft 11 in (180 cm)
- Weight: 168 lb (76 kg; 12 st 0 lb)
- Position: Forward
- Shoots: Left
- Czech Extraliga team: HC Plzeň
- Playing career: 2010–present

Patrik Petruška (born July 31, 1991) is a Czech professional ice hockey player. He played with HC Plzeň in the Czech Extraliga during the 2010–11 Czech Extraliga season.
