= Turo Järvinen =

Finnish ice hockey player

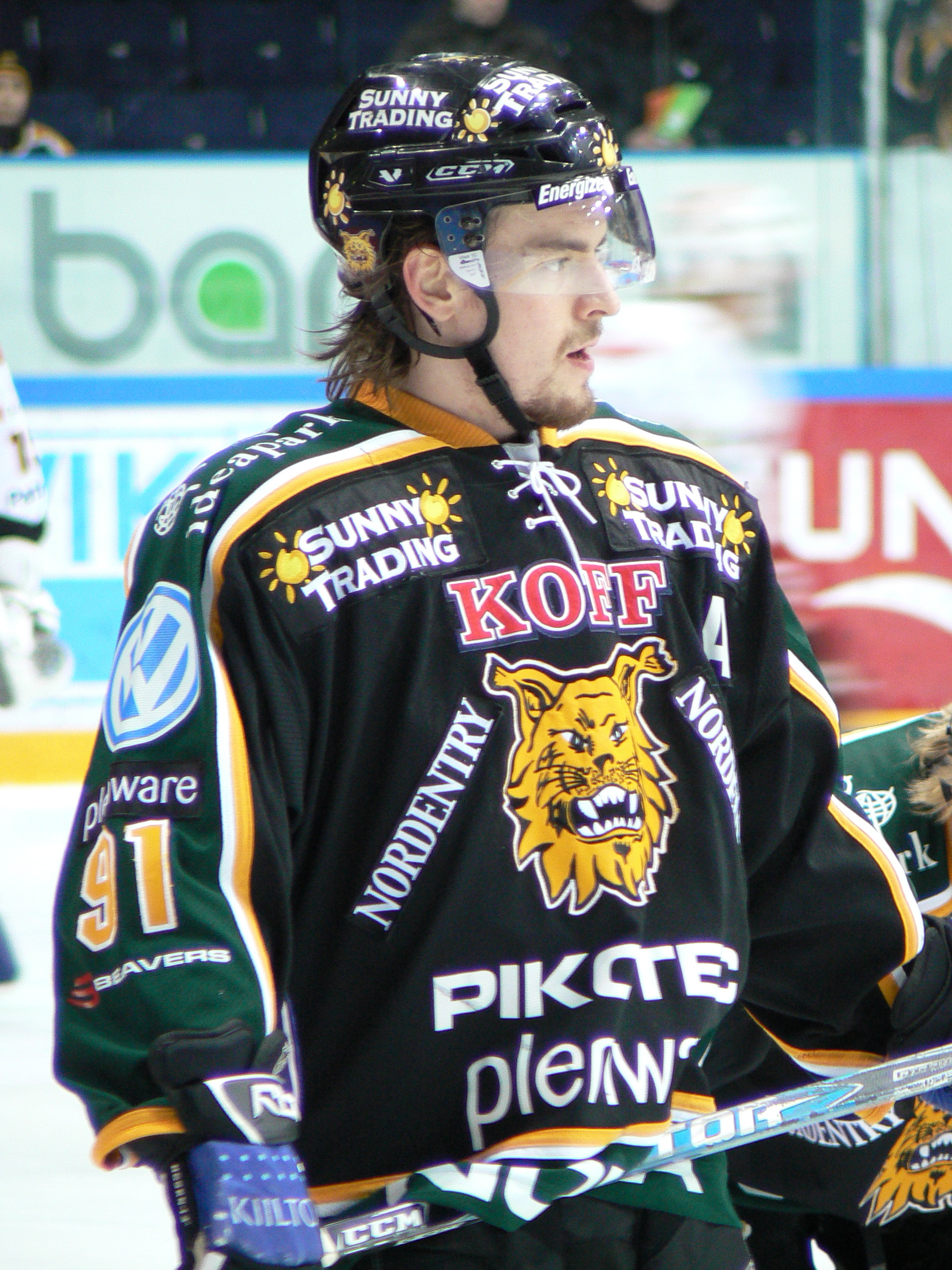
- Born: January 6, 1982 (age 43); Vantaa, Finland
- Height: 5 ft 11.6 in (182 cm)
- Weight: 194 lb (88 kg; 13 st 12 lb)
- Position: Forward
- Shot: Left
- Played for: HIFK; HC Salamat; K-Vantaa; Hyvinkään Ahmat
- NHL draft: Undrafted
- Playing career: 2002–2012

Turo Järvinen is a Finnish former professional ice hockey forward who last played for HIFK of the SM-liiga.
