= Michael Kolarz =

Czech ice hockey player

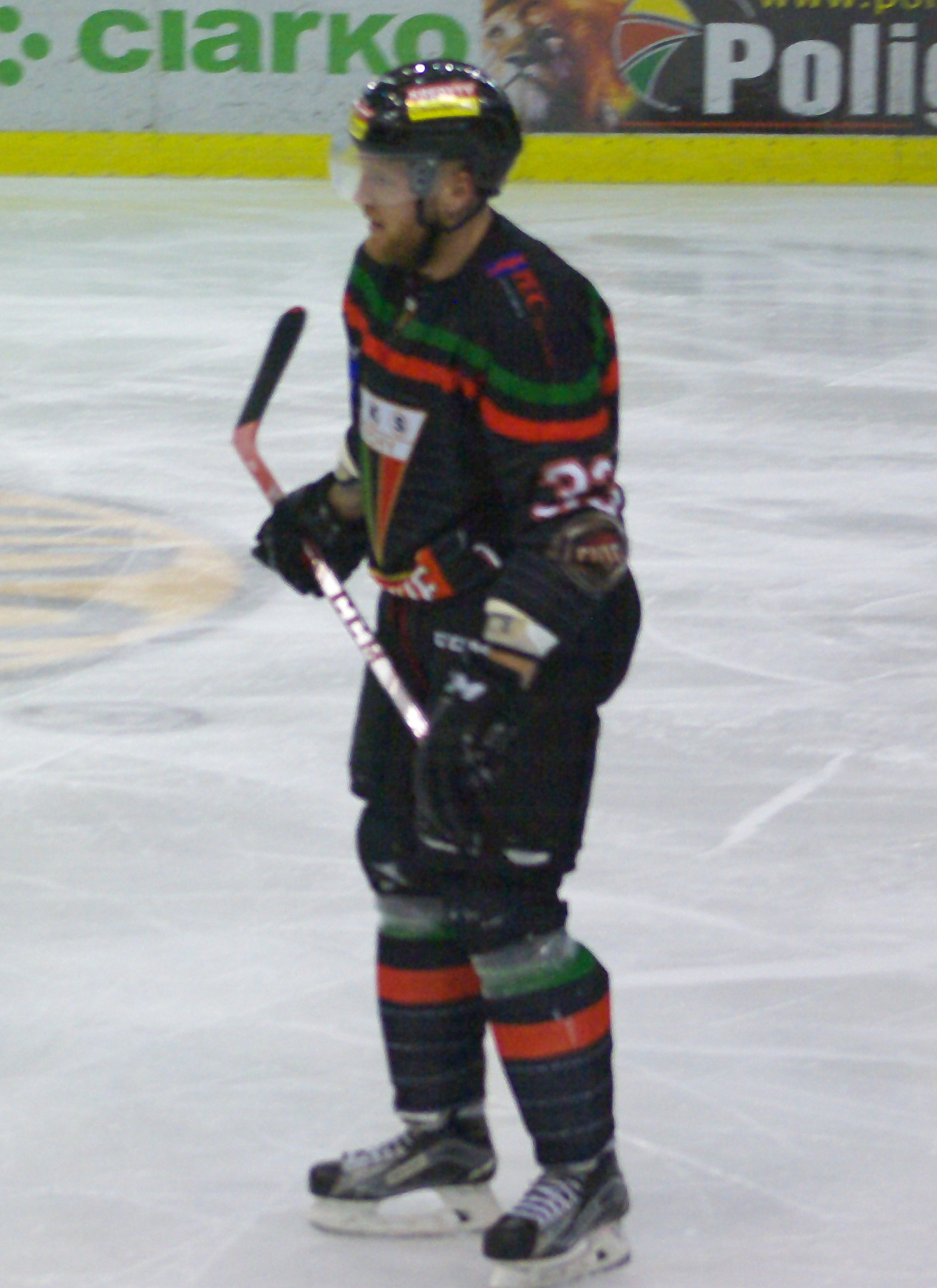
- Born: 12 January 1987 (age 38); Havířov, Czechoslovakia
- Height: 6 ft 1 in (185 cm)
- Weight: 198 lb (90 kg; 14 st 2 lb)
- Position: Defence
- Shoots: Right
- Czech Extraliga team: HC České Budějovice
- Playing career: 2007–present

Michael Kolarz (born 12 January 1987) is a Czech professional ice hockey defenceman currently with HC České Budějovice in the Czech Extraliga.

Kolarz previously played for Kingston Frontenacs, HC Havířov, SK Kadaň and MšHK Žilina.
