= Jan Švrček =

Czech ice hockey player

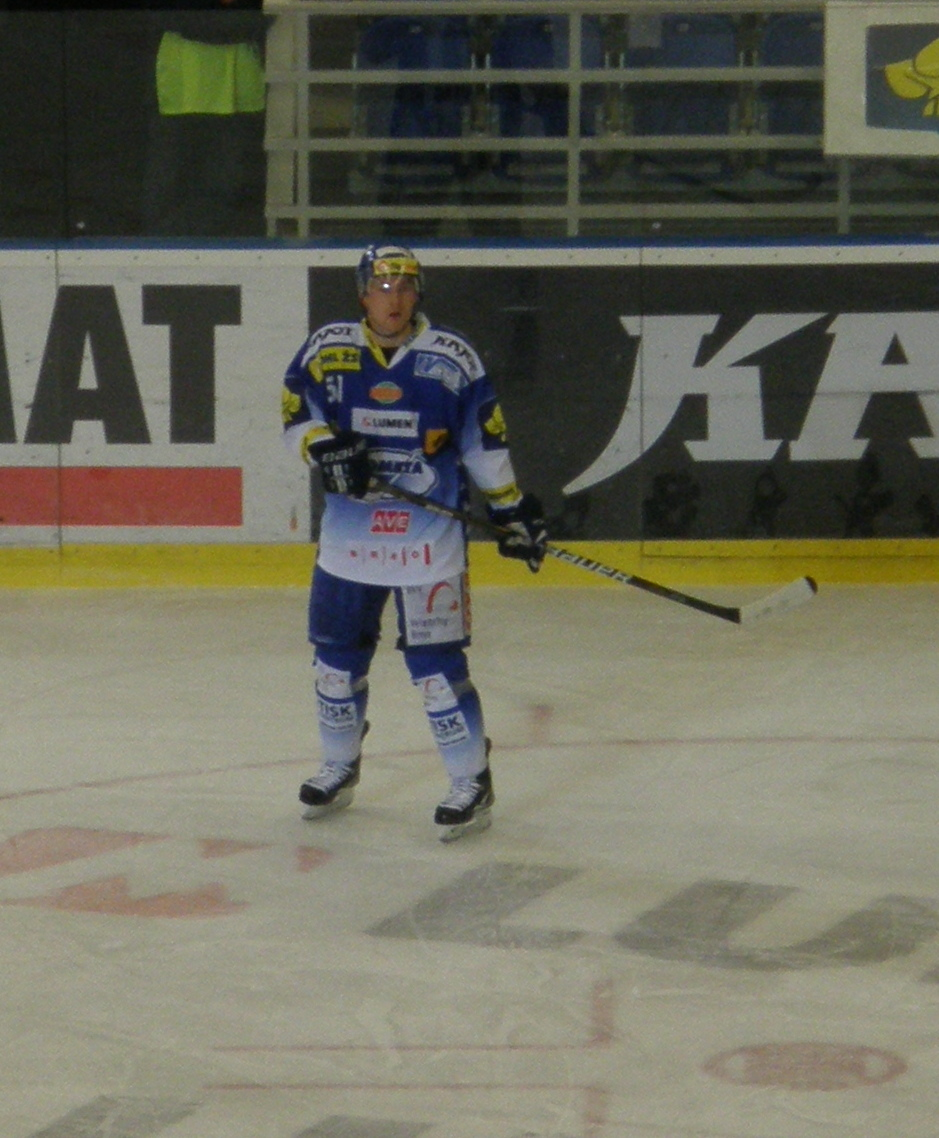
- Born: April 17, 1986 (age 38); Přerov, Czechoslovakia
- Height: 6 ft 2 in (188 cm)
- Weight: 196 lb (89 kg; 14 st 0 lb)
- Position: Defence
- Shoots: Left
- Czech Extraliga team: HC Sparta Prague
- Playing career: 2006–present

Jan Švrček (born April 17, 1986) is a Czech professional ice hockey defenceman. He played with HC Sparta Prague in the Czech Extraliga during the 2010–11 Czech Extraliga season.
