= Jiří Vašíček =

Czech ice hockey player

- Born: 31 December 1980 (age 45) Pardubice, Czechoslovakia
- Height: 6 ft 0 in (183 cm)
- Weight: 203 lb (92 kg; 14 st 7 lb)
- Position: Defence
- Shoots: Left
- Extraliga team: HC Slavia Praha

Jiří Vašíček (born 31 December 1980) is a Czech professional ice hockey defenceman who plays for HC CSOB Pojistovna Pardubice of the Czech Extraliga.

Vašíček previously played for KLH Vajgar Jindřichův Hradec and HC Rebel Havlíčkův Brod.
