= Ossi Saarinen =

Finnish ice hockey player (born 1986)

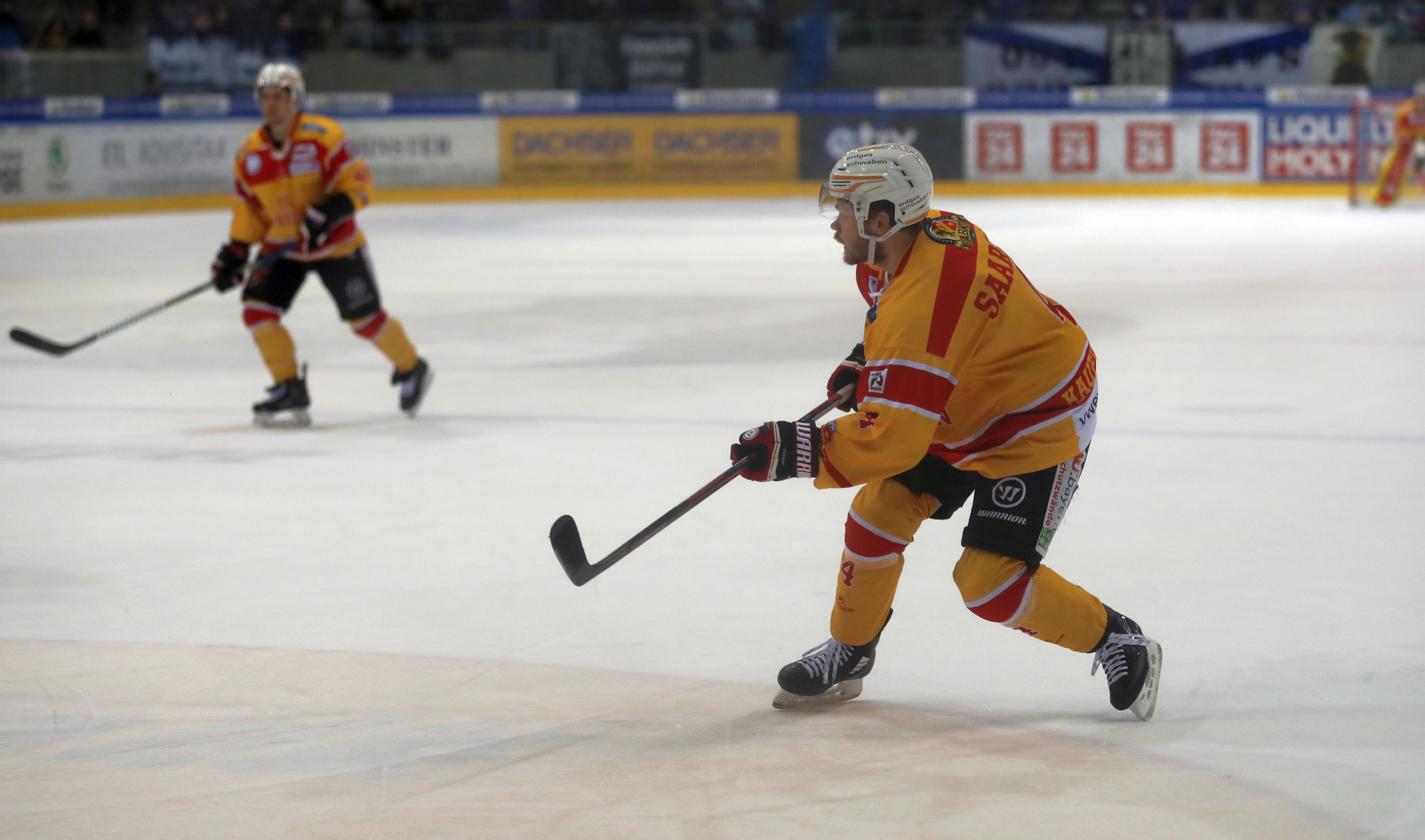
- 2019-01-11 Dresdner Eislöwen gegen ESV Kaufbeuren by Sandro Halank–093.
- Born: December 9, 1986 (age 39) Helsinki, FIN
- Height: 6 ft 1 in (185 cm)
- Weight: 183 lb (83 kg; 13 st 1 lb)
- Position: Left wing
- Shot: Left
- Metal team Former teams: IC Gentofte; Jokerit; KalPa; HC Nové Zámky
- Playing career: 2006–2020

Ossi Saarinen (born December 9, 1986, in Helsinki, Finland) is a Finnish former professional ice hockey forward. He played for Danish club, IC Gentofte in the Metal Ligaen. Saarinen joined Gentofte on a one-year contract after playing three seasons with KalPa in the Finnish Liiga on September 4, 2014.
