= Petr Sailer =

Czech ice hockey player

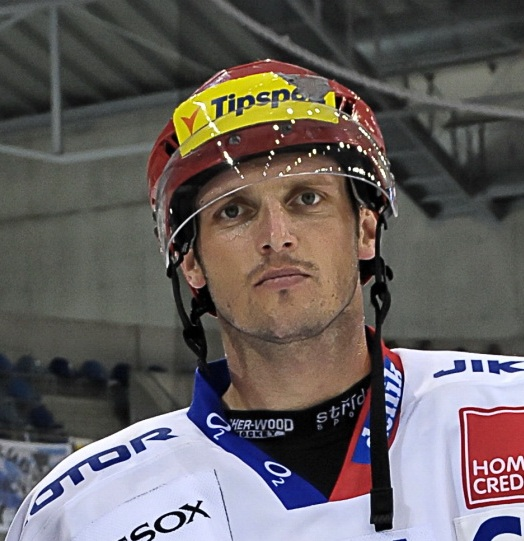
- Petr Sailer
- Born: September 18, 1975 (age 50) Jindřichův Hradec, Czechoslovakia
- Height: 6 ft 0 in (183 cm)
- Weight: 183 lb (83 kg; 13 st 1 lb)
- Position: Forward
- Shoots: Right
- Czech Extraliga team: HC Karlovy Vary
- Playing career: 1993–present

Petr Sailer (born September 18, 1975) is a Czech professional ice hockey player. He played with HC Karlovy Vary in the Czech Extraliga during the 2010–11 Czech Extraliga season.

Sailer previously played for HC České Budějovice, HC Slavia Praha and HC Bílí Tygři Liberec.
