= Victor Jigmalm =

Swedish ice hockey player

- Born: February 2, 1992 (age 33) Linköping, Sweden
- Height: 5 ft 9 in (175 cm)
- Weight: 159 lb (72 kg; 11 st 5 lb)
- Position: Left wing
- Shoots: Left
- Elitserien team: Linköpings HC
- NHL draft: Undrafted
- Playing career: 2011–present

Victor Jigmalm (born February 2, 1992) is a Swedish professional ice hockey player who currently plays for Linköpings HC in the Swedish Elitserien.
