= Jarkko Hattunen =

Finnish ice hockey player

- Born: January 22, 1987 (age 38); Kajaani, Finland
- Height: 5 ft 10 in (178 cm)
- Weight: 185 lb (84 kg; 13 st 3 lb)
- Position: Forward
- Shoots: Left
- SM-liiga team: TPS

Jarkko Hattunen is a Finnish ice hockey player who currently plays professionally in Finland for TPS of the SM-liiga.
