= Roman Erat =

Czech professional ice hockey player

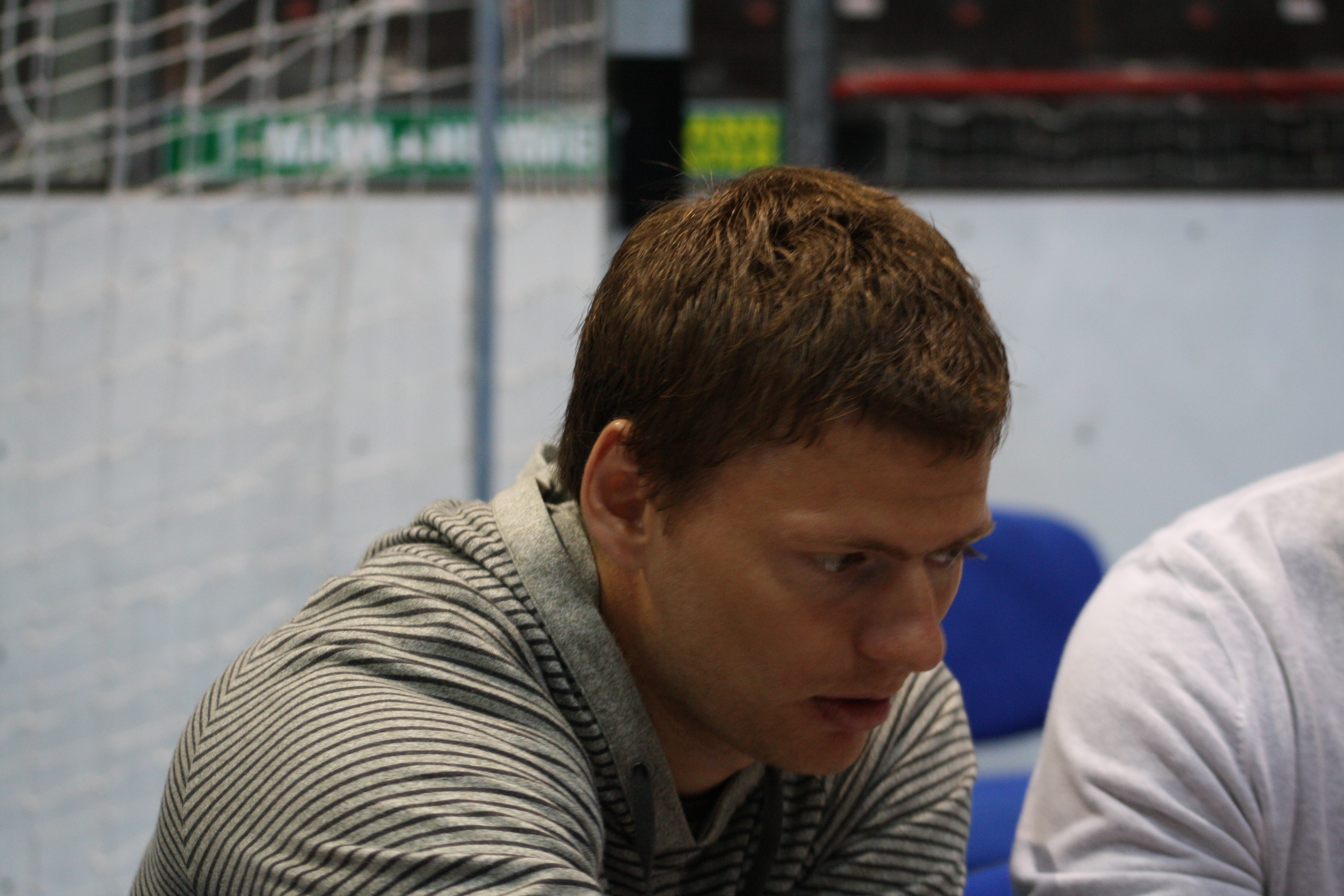
- Born: 12 May 1979 (age 46) Třebíč, Czechoslovakia
- Height: 5 ft 10 in (178 cm)
- Weight: 187 lb (85 kg; 13 st 5 lb)
- Position: Right wing
- Shot: Left
- Played for: HC Znojemští Orli; HC Kometa Brno
- NHL draft: Undrafted
- Playing career: 1997–2018

Roman Erat (born 12 May 1979 in Třebíč) is a former Czech professional ice hockey player who played in the Czech Extraliga (ELH) for the HC Znojemští Orli and HC Kometa Brno.

Erat previously played for SK Horácká Slavia Třebíč.
