= Michal Hudec =

Slovak ice hockey player

- Born: October 23, 1979 (age 46)
- Slovak Extraliga team: HC 05 Banská Bystrica

Michal Hudec (born October 23, 1979) is a Slovak professional ice hockey player who played with HC 05 Banská Bystrica in the Slovak Extraliga.
