= Rostislav Martynek =

Czech ice hockey player

- Born: October 10, 1982 (age 42); Třinec, Czechoslovakia
- Height: 5 ft 8 in (173 cm)
- Weight: 161 lb (73 kg; 11 st 7 lb)
- Position: Forward
- Shoots: Right
- Czech Extraliga team: HC České Budějovice
- Playing career: 2002–present

Rostislav Martynek (born October 10, 1982) is a Czech professional ice hockey player. He played with HC České Budějovice in the Czech Extraliga during the 2010–11 Czech Extraliga season.

Martynek played previously for HC Oceláři Třinec.
