= Niko Tuhkanen =

Finnish ice hockey player

- Born: 18 April 1988 (age 36); Lahti, Finland
- Height: 5 ft 10 in (178 cm)
- Weight: 187 lb (85 kg; 13 st 5 lb)
- Position: Defence
- Shot: Left
- Played for: Lahti Pelicans; Espoo Blues; Tappara; KooKoo
- NHL draft: Undrafted
- Playing career: 2008–2020

Niko Tuhkanen (born 18 April 1988) is a Finnish former professional ice hockey defenceman who played in the Liiga (formerly SM-liiga) for the Lahti Pelicans, Espoo Blues, Tappara and KooKoo.
