= Lukáš Květoň =

Czech ice hockey player

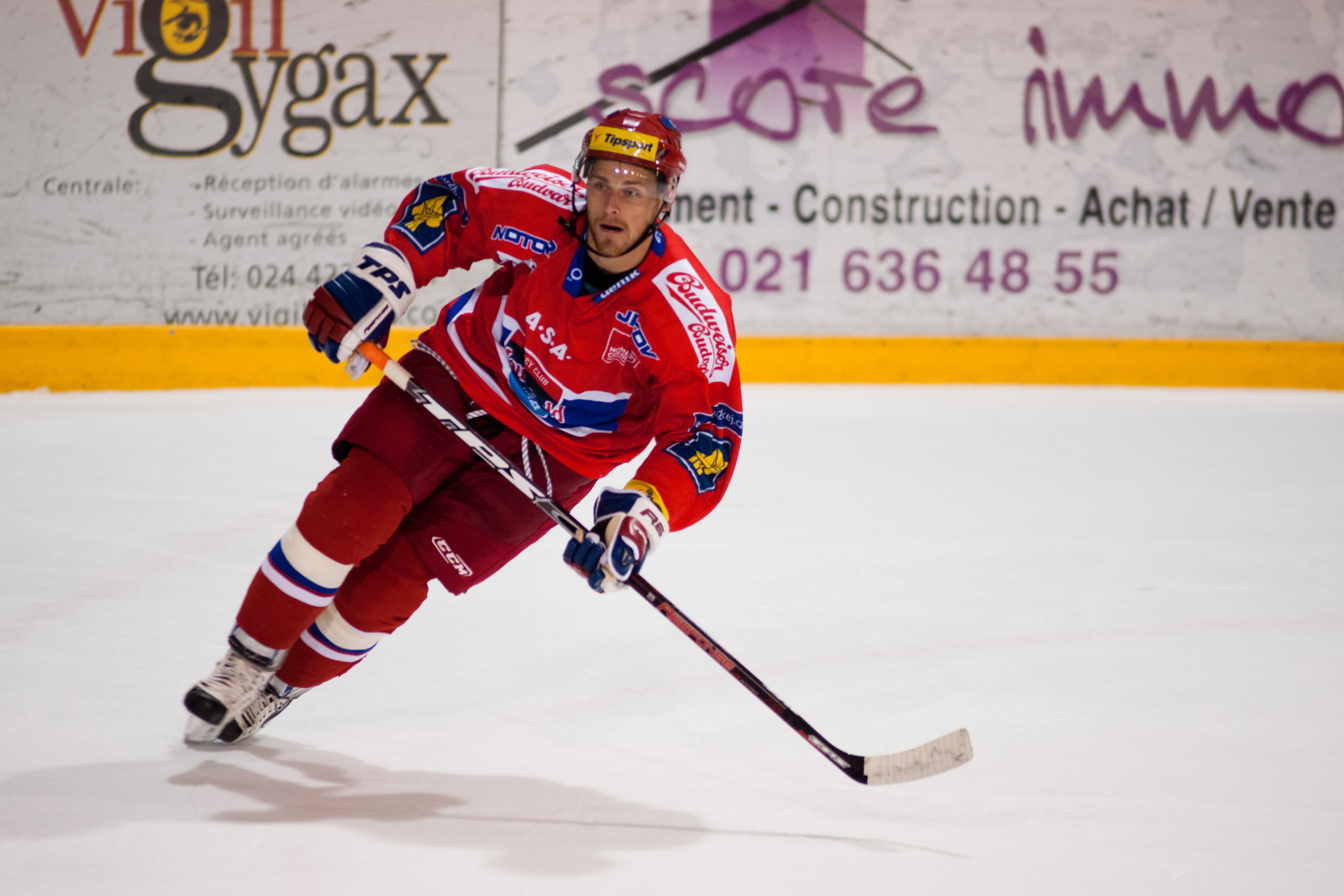
- Lukáš Květoň - Lausanne Hockey Club vs. HC České Budějovice, 27 August 2010
- Born: May 3, 1982 (age 43) Tábor, Czechoslovakia
- Height: 6 ft 0 in (183 cm)
- Weight: 181 lb (82 kg; 12 st 13 lb)
- Position: Forward
- Shot: Left
- Played for: HC České Budějovice; HK Hradec Králové; Piráti Chomutov; HC Dukla Jihlava
- Playing career: 2002–2019

Lukáš Květoň (born May 3, 1982) is a Czech former professional ice hockey forward who played with HC České Budějovice in the Czech Extraliga from 2002 to 2013. Květoň previously played for HK Hradec Králové, Piráti Chomutov and HC Dukla Jihlava.
