= Michal Pavlů =

Czech ice hockey player

- Born: 17 April 1987 (age 37)
- Height: 6 ft 1 in (185 cm)
- Weight: 181 lb (82 kg; 12 st 13 lb)
- Position: Defence
- Shoots: Right
- Czechia3 team Former teams: HC Vlci Jablonec nad Nisou; HC Kladno; HC Bílí Tygři Liberec
- NHL draft: Undrafted
- Playing career: 2007–present

Michal Pavlů (born 17 April 1987) is a Czech professional ice hockey defenceman who currently plays with HC Bílí Tygři Liberec in the Czech Extraliga.

Pavlů previously played for HC Hradec Králové, HC Kladno and HC Benátky nad Jizerou.
