= Juha Toivonen =

Finnish ice hockey player

- Born: June 10, 1987 (age 37); Hattula, Finland
- Height: 6 ft 0 in (183 cm)
- Weight: 176 lb (80 kg; 12 st 8 lb)
- Position: Goaltender
- Catches: Left
- Liiga team Former teams: Free Agent; HPK; KalPa
- Playing career: 2006–present

Juha Toivonen (born June 10, 1987) is a Finnish ice hockey goaltender. His is currently an Unrestricted Free Agent who most recently played with Mikkelin Jukurit in the Finnish Mestis.

Toivonen made his SM-liiga debut playing with HPK during the 2005–06 SM-liiga season.
