= Ondrej Janík =

Slovak ice hockey player

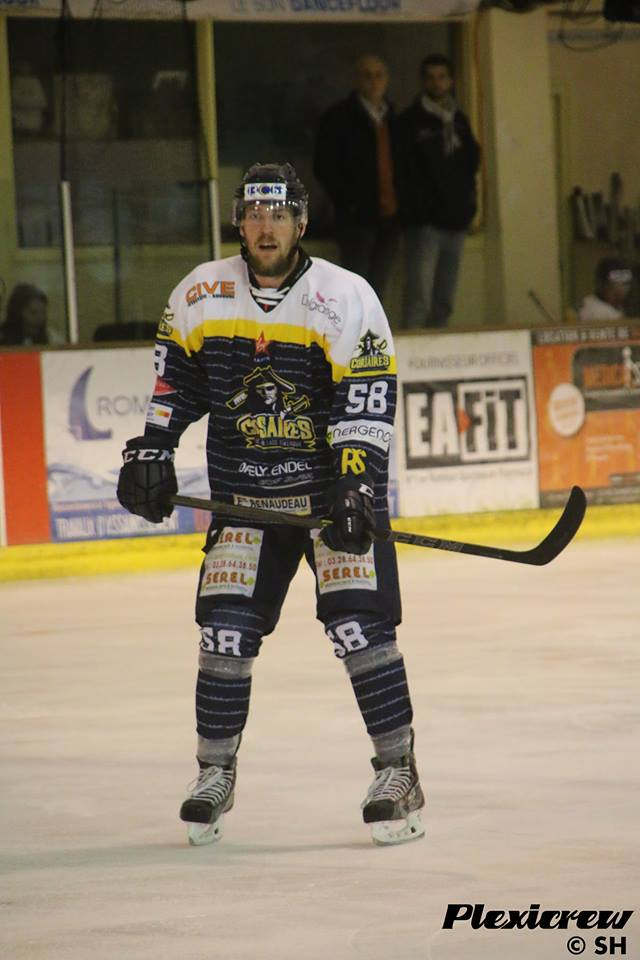
- Born: September 18, 1990 (age 35) Myjava, Slovakia
- Slovak Extraliga team: HC Slovan Bratislava

Ondrej Janík (Myjava, 1990) is a Slovak professional ice hockey player who played with HC Slovan Bratislava in the Slovak Extraliga.
