= Jan Křivohlávek =

Czech ice hockey player

- Born: August 20, 1991 (age 33); Havířov, Czechoslovakia
- Height: 6 ft 1 in (185 cm)
- Weight: 187 lb (85 kg; 13 st 5 lb)
- Position: Centre
- Shoots: Left
- FPHL team Former teams: Carolina Thunderbirds; HC Kometa Brno
- Playing career: 2010–present

Jan Křivohlávek (born August 20, 1991) is a Czech professional ice hockey player who currently plays with the Carolina Thunderbirds of the Federal Prospects Hockey League (FPHL).

Křivohlávek previously played in the Czech Extraliga for HC Kometa Brno, between 2010 and 2014. in the Czech Extraliga.
