= Kristian Tuohilampi =

Finnish ice hockey player

- Born: November 8, 1989 (age 36) Helsinki
- Height: 5 ft 11 in (180 cm)
- Weight: 187 lb (85 kg; 13 st 5 lb)
- Position: Defense
- Shoots: Left
- SM-liiga team: HIFK Helsinki
- Playing career: 2011–present

Kristian Tuohilampi (born November 8, 1989) is a Finnish ice hockey defenceman who is currently playing for the HIFK Helsinki of the SM-liiga.
