= David Kajínek =

Czech ice hockey player

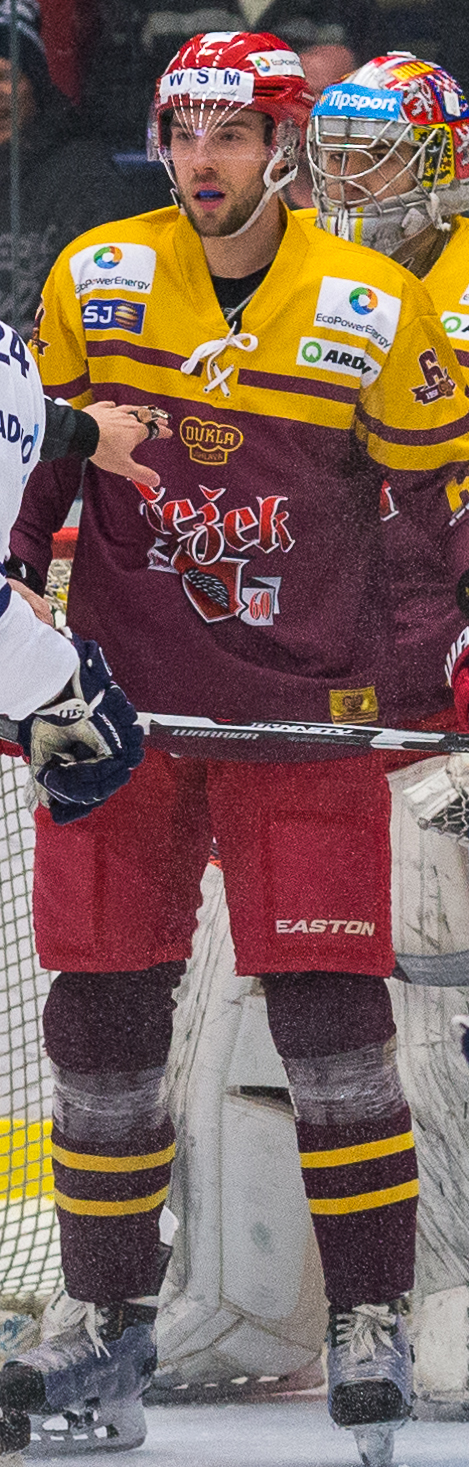
- Born: July 10, 1988 (age 36); Frýdlant, Czechoslovakia
- Height: 6 ft 3 in (191 cm)
- Weight: 181 lb (82 kg; 12 st 13 lb)
- Position: Defence
- Shoots: Left
- Czech Extraliga team Former teams: HC Dukla Jihlava; Bílí Tygři Liberec
- Playing career: 2008–present

David Kajínek (born July 10, 1988) is a Czech professional ice hockey defenceman who currently plays for HC Dukla Jihlava in the Czech 1.liga. He previously played for Bílí Tygři Liberec in the Czech Extraliga.
