= Christian Silfver =

Finnish ice hockey player

- Born: August 19, 1991 (age 33); Helsinki, Finland
- Height: 5 ft 10 in (178 cm)
- Weight: 154 lb (70 kg; 11 st 0 lb)
- Position: Defence
- Shoots: Left
- Metal Ligaen team Former teams: SønderjyskE Ishockey; HIFK; Lahti Pelicans; Peliitat Heinola; Herning Blue Fox; Hvidovre Fighters
- NHL draft: Undrafted
- Playing career: 2011–present

Christian Silfver (born August 19, 1991) is a Finnish ice hockey defenceman. He is currently playing with SønderjyskE Ishockey in the Danish Metal Ligaen.

Silfver made his SM-liiga debut playing with HIFK during the 2011–12 SM-liiga season.
