= Vladislav Koutský =

Czech ice hockey player

- Born: April 19, 1985 (age 39); Hronov, Czechoslovakia
- Height: 5 ft 11 in (180 cm)
- Weight: 156 lb (71 kg; 11 st 2 lb)
- Position: Goalie
- Catches: Left
- [[]] team Former teams: HC Spartak Choceň; HC Oceláři Třinec; HC Dynamo Pardubice
- NHL draft: Undrafted
- Playing career: 2003–present

Vladislav Koutský (born April 19, 1985) is a Czech professional ice hockey goalie. He is currently playing for HC Spartak Choceň of the FFHG Division 1.

Koutský made his Czech Extraliga debut playing with HC Dynamo Pardubice during the 2003-04 Czech Extraliga season.
