= Aleksis Ahlqvist =

Finnish ice hockey player

- Born: March 28, 1986 (age 39) Jyväskylä, Finland
- Height: 6 ft 2 in (188 cm)
- Weight: 192 lb (87 kg; 13 st 10 lb)
- Position: Goaltender
- Caught: Left
- Played for: JYP Jyväskylä; HIFK; KalPa; Timrå IK; TPS; Dauphins d'Épinal; Scorpions de Mulhouse
- Playing career: 2005–2015

Aleksis Ahlqvist (born March 28, 1986) is a Finnish former professional ice hockey goaltender.

Ahlqvist played in the SM-liiga for JYP Jyväskylä, HIFK, KalPa and TPS.
