= Marek Tomica =

Czech ice hockey player

- Born: 1 January 1981 (age 44); Třebíč, Czechoslovakia
- Height: 6 ft 0 in (183 cm)
- Weight: 181 lb (82 kg; 12 st 13 lb)
- Position: Forward
- Shot: Left
- Extraliga team Former teams: Piráti Chomutov; HC Slavia Praha
- National team: Czech Republic
- NHL draft: 285th overall, 2001; Dallas Stars
- Playing career: 2000–2021

Marek Tomica (born 1 January 1981) is a Czech professional ice hockey forward who currently plays for HC Slavia Praha of the Czech Extraliga.

Tomica played previously for HC Berounští Medvědi and BK Mladá Boleslav.

== Career statistics ==
=== Regular season and playoffs ===
			Regular season					Playoffs
Season	Team	League	GP	G	A	Pts	PIM	GP	G	A	Pts	PIM
1996–97	HC Dukla Jihlava	CZE U18	22	3	4	7		—	—	—	—	—
1997–98	HC Dukla Jihlava	CZE U18	36	28	24	52		—	—	—	—	—
1998–99	HC Dukla Jihlava	CZE U20
1999–2000	HC Slavia Praha	CZE U20	41	13	8	21	16	7	2	3	5	0
1999–2000	HC Slavia Praha	ELH	13	0	0	0	2	11	0	0	0	0
2000–01	HC Slavia Praha	CZE U20	5	2	2	4	4	—	—	—	—	—
2000–01	HC Slavia Praha	ELH	37	3	9	12	8	11	0	0	0	0
2000–01	HC Berounští Medvědi	CZE.2	8	0	2	2	2	—	—	—	—	—
2000–01	HC Mladá Boleslav	CZE.2	—	—	—	—	—	2	0	0	0	6
2001–02	HC Slavia Praha	CZE U20	5	2	3	5	0	—	—	—	—	—
2001–02	HC Slavia Praha	ELH	49	6	8	14	14	8	0	0	0	4
2002–03	HC Slavia Praha	ELH	32	1	3	4	14	13	0	1	1	10
2003–04	HC Slavia Praha	ELH	48	3	9	12	20	19	4	2	6	10
2004–05	HC Slavia Praha	ELH	42	10	9	19	14	7	1	1	2	0
2005–06	HC Slavia Praha	ELH	49	13	15	28	50	15	1	2	3	16
2006–07	HC Slavia Praha	ELH	30	4	3	7	24	6	1	0	1	10
2007–08	HC Slavia Praha	ELH	47	4	10	14	61	19	0	2	2	18
2008–09	HC Slavia Praha	ELH	39	2	11	13	26	16	1	0	1	12
2009–10	HC Slavia Praha	ELH	43	7	7	14	22	2	0	0	0	0
2010–11	HC Slavia Praha	ELH	51	10	3	13	26	19	1	1	2	10
2011–12	HC Slavia Praha	ELH	45	4	4	8	12	—	—	—	—	—
2012–13	HC Slavia Praha	ELH	40	2	8	10	22	11	4	0	4	2
2013–14	HC Slavia Praha	ELH	41	4	8	12	30	3	1	0	1	0
2014–15	HC Slavia Praha	ELH	23	3	4	7	10	—	—	—	—	—
2015–16	Piráti Chomutov	ELH	50	5	9	14	38	7	0	2	2	0
2016–17	Piráti Chomutov	ELH	50	7	12	19	22	16	1	3	4	8
2017–18	Piráti Chomutov	ELH	31	5	6	11	33	—	—	—	—	—
2018–19	Piráti Chomutov	ELH	47	3	6	9	38	—	—	—	—	—
2019–20	Piráti Chomutov	CZE.2	56	5	9	14	16	—	—	—	—	—
2020–21	HC Slavia Praha	CZE.2	22	0	3	3	8	—	—	—	—	—
ELH totals			807	96	144	240	486	183	15	14	29	110

=== International ===
Year	Team	Event	GP	G	A	Pts	PIM
2001	Czech Republic	WJC	6	1	1	2	4
Junior totals			6	1	1	2	4
