= Jaroslav Mrázek =

Czech ice hockey player

- Born: January 14, 1986 (age 40) Milevsko, Czechoslovakia
- Height: 6 ft 2 in (188 cm)
- Weight: 209 lb (95 kg; 14 st 13 lb)
- Position: Defence
- Shoots: Left
- Czech Extraliga team: HC Kladno
- NHL draft: 179th overall, 2004; New York Islanders
- Playing career: 2004–present

Jaroslav Mrázek (born January 14, 1986) is a Czech professional ice hockey defenceman who most recently played for LHK Jestřábi Prostějov of Czech 2.liga.

He was selected by the New York Islanders in the 6th round (179th overall) of the 2004 NHL entry draft.

Mrázek played with HC Kladno in the Czech Extraliga during the 2010–11 Czech Extraliga season.

== Career statistics ==
=== Regular season and playoffs ===
			Regular season					Playoffs
Season	Team	League	GP	G	A	Pts	PIM	GP	G	A	Pts	PIM
2000–01	SHC Vajgar Jindřichův Hradec	CZE.2 U18	12	0	0	0	4	5	0	0	0	4
2001–02	HC Sparta Praha	CZE U18	33	3	12	15	20	6	0	2	2	4
2002–03	HC Sparta Praha	CZE U18	15	8	6	14	16	—	—	—	—	—
2002–03	HC Sparta Praha	CZE U20	17	0	2	2	8	3	2	0	2	4
2003–04	HC Sparta Praha	CZE U20	37	3	6	9	36	—	—	—	—	—
2003–04	HC Sparta Praha	ELH	1	0	0	0	0	1	0	0	0	0
2004–05	Toronto St. Michael's Majors	OHL	57	0	2	2	54	10	0	3	3	8
2005–06	Toronto St. Michael's Majors	OHL	61	0	12	12	84	4	0	1	1	2
2006–07	HC Sparta Praha	ELH	9	0	0	0	4	—	—	—	—	—
2006–07	HC GEUS OKNA Kladno	ELH	20	0	1	1	24	—	—	—	—	—
2006–07	HC Berounští Medvědi	CZE.2	15	3	0	3	45	—	—	—	—	—
2006–07	HC Slovan Ústečtí Lvi	CZE.2	1	0	0	0	2	—	—	—	—	—
2007–08	HC Vítkovice Steel	ELH	22	1	0	1	18	—	—	—	—	—
2007–08	HC Kometa Brno	CZE.2	5	0	1	1	0	—	—	—	—	—
2007–08	HC VCES Hradec Králové, a.s.	CZE.2	1	0	0	0	0	—	—	—	—	—
2007–08	HC Sareza Ostrava	CZE.2	7	1	2	3	8	6	1	2	3	35
2008–09	HC Znojemští Orli	ELH	44	2	3	5	36	—	—	—	—	—
2008–09	HC Olomouc	CZE.2	6	1	1	2	4	—	—	—	—	—
2009–10	HC Sparta Praha	ELH	28	0	1	1	18	—	—	—	—	—
2009–10	HC Berounští Medvědi	CZE.2	5	0	0	0	14	—	—	—	—	—
2009–10	HC GEUS OKNA Kladno	ELH	6	2	0	2	8	—	—	—	—	—
2010–11	HC Vagnerplast Kladno	ELH	31	3	4	7	14	—	—	—	—	—
2011–12	Piráti Chomutov	CZE.2	52	5	6	11	52	24	0	4	4	40
2012–13	Piráti Chomutov	ELH	47	2	5	7	30	—	—	—	—	—
2013–14	Piráti Chomutov	ELH	32	2	3	5	34	—	—	—	—	—
2014–15	Piráti Chomutov	CZE.2	15	0	3	3	10	3	0	0	0	0
2014–15	SK Kadaň	CZE.2	26	3	4	7	32	—	—	—	—	—
2015–16	Piráti Chomutov	ELH	17	0	4	4	6	4	0	1	1	2
2015–16	SK Kadaň	CZE.2	26	4	11	15	30	—	—	—	—	—
2015–16	Rytíři Kladno	CZE.2	7	0	1	1	6	—	—	—	—	—
2016–17	Piráti Chomutov	ELH	42	3	5	8	22	13	2	1	3	18
2016–17	SK Trhači Kadaň	CZE.2	2	1	1	2	4	—	—	—	—	—
2017–18	Piráti Chomutov	ELH	43	4	10	14	34	—	—	—	—	—
2018–19	Piráti Chomutov	ELH	14	0	2	2	6	—	—	—	—	—
2018–19	HC Vítkovice Ridera	ELH	27	1	2	3	8	8	0	1	1	6
2019–20	LHK Jestřábi Prostějov	CZE.2	52	4	16	20	70	—	—	—	—	—
2021–22	HC Uherské Hradiště	CZE.4	4	1	2	3	10	—	—	—	—	—
2022–23	HC Uherské Hradiště	CZE.4	8	3	3	6	14	—	—	—	—	—
ELH totals			383	20	40	60	262	26	2	3	5	26
CZE.2 totals			222	22	46	68	277	33	1	6	7	75

=== International ===
Year	Team	Event	GP	G	A	Pts	PIM
2004	Czech Republic	WJC18	7	0	0	0	6
2006	Czech Republic	WJC	6	0	0	0	8
Junior totals			13	0	0	0	14
