= Martin Rýgl =

Czech ice hockey player (born 1986)

- Born: May 14, 1986 (age 40) Jablonec nad Nisou, Czechoslovakia
- Height: 5 ft 10 in (178 cm)
- Weight: 145 lb (66 kg; 10 st 5 lb)
- Position: Defence
- Shot: Right
- Czech Extraliga team: HC Bílí Tygři Liberec
- NHL draft: Undrafted
- Playing career: 2005–2020

Martin Rýgl (born 14 May 1986, in Jablonec nad Nisou) is a Czech professional ice hockey defenceman who currently plays with HC Bílí Tygři Liberec in the Czech Extraliga.

Rýgl previously played for HC Dukla Jihlava, HC Berounští Medvědi, BK Mladá Boleslav, HC Znojemští Orli, HC Olomouc and HC Benátky nad Jizerou.

== Career statistics ==
			Regular season					Playoffs
Season	Team	League	GP	G	A	Pts	PIM	GP	G	A	Pts	PIM
2000–01	Bili Tygri Liberec U18	Czech U18	13	0	1	1	2	—	—	—	—	—
2001–02	Bili Tygri Liberec U18	Czech U18	16	1	1	2	28	—	—	—	—	—
2002–03	Bili Tygri Liberec U18	Czech U18	35	3	13	16	30	—	—	—	—	—
2002–03	Bili Tygri Liberec U20	Czech U20	5	0	2	2	0	4	0	1	1	0
2003–04	Bili Tygri Liberec U20	Czech U20	55	8	22	30	48	2	0	0	0	2
2004–05	Bili Tygri Liberec U20	Czech U20	43	7	12	19	38	—	—	—	—	—
2005–06	Bili Tygri Liberec U20	Czech U20	13	1	4	5	12	—	—	—	—	—
2005–06	HC Dukla Jihlava U20	Czech U20	8	2	6	8	12	—	—	—	—	—
2005–06	Bili Tygri Liberec	Czech	12	0	3	3	8	—	—	—	—	—
2005–06	HC Berounští Medvědi	Czech2	9	1	1	2	6	—	—	—	—	—
2005–06	HC Dukla Jihlava	Czech2	16	0	1	1	18	—	—	—	—	—
2005–06	HC Vrchlabí	Czech3	5	2	2	4	2	7	0	2	2	10
2006–07	Bili Tygri Liberec	Czech	33	1	3	4	18	8	0	0	0	10
2006–07	HC Berounští Medvědi	Czech2	26	2	3	5	30	—	—	—	—	—
2006–07	BK Mladá Boleslav	Czech2	12	1	2	3	12	1	0	0	0	2
2007–08	Bili Tygri Liberec	Czech	12	0	0	0	4	—	—	—	—	—
2007–08	HC Vrchlabí	Czech	38	7	9	16	42	9	0	6	6	10
2008–09	HC Znojemští Orli	Czech	38	3	6	9	8	—	—	—	—	—
2008–09	HC Olomouc	Czech2	15	0	3	3	8	—	—	—	—	—
2009–10	Bili Tygri Liberec	Czech	51	2	9	11	34	14	2	1	3	2
2009–10	HC Benátky nad Jizerou	Czech2	4	1	1	2	4	—	—	—	—	—
2010–11	Bili Tygri Liberec	Czech	24	0	3	3	2	—	—	—	—	—
2010–11	BK Mladá Boleslav	Czech	2	0	0	0	2	—	—	—	—	—
2010–11	HC Benátky nad Jizerou	Czech2	10	2	4	6	8	—	—	—	—	—
2011–12	BK Mladá Boleslav	Czech	52	3	5	8	42	—	—	—	—	—
2012–13	Piráti Chomutov	Czech	46	2	14	16	32	—	—	—	—	—
2013–14	HC Energie Karlovy Vary	Czech	31	0	7	7	28	—	—	—	—	—
2014–15	Piráti Chomutov	Czech2	45	6	7	13	28	—	—	—	—	—
2015–16	Piráti Chomutov	Czech	17	0	3	3	8	—	—	—	—	—
2015–16	SK Kadaň	Czech2	7	0	1	1	6	—	—	—	—	—
2015–16	BK Mladá Boleslav	Czech	21	0	3	3	18	10	0	3	3	4
2016–17	HC Dynamo Pardubice	Czech	2	0	1	1	0	—	—	—	—	—
2016–17	HC Energie Karlovy Vary	Czech	27	2	3	5	20	—	—	—	—	—
2017–18	HK Nitra	Slovak	44	2	11	13	28	8	1	3	4	0
2018–19	HK Dukla Trencin	Slovak	57	7	9	16	54	6	1	0	1	6
2019–20	Piráti Chomutov	Czech2	44	3	8	11	38	—	—	—	—	—
Czech totals			368	13	60	73	234	32	2	4	6	16
Czech2 totals			226	23	40	63	200	10	0	6	6	12
Slovak totals			101	9	20	29	82	14	2	3	5	6
