= David Nosek =

Czech ice hockey player

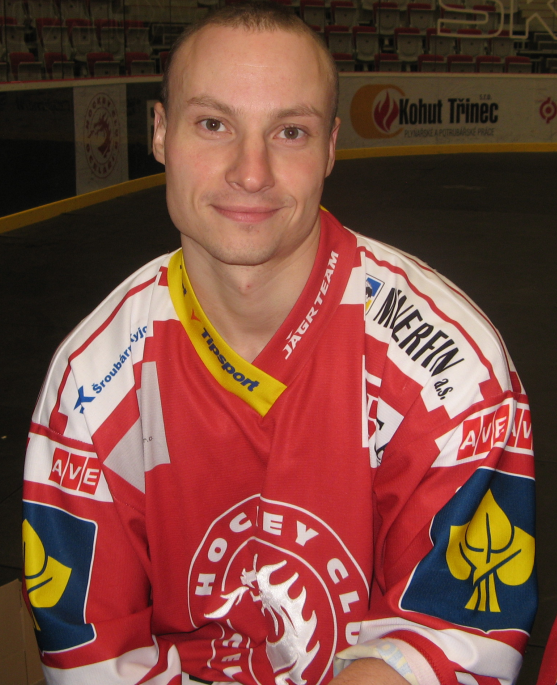
- Born: February 19, 1981 (age 45) Olomouc, Czechoslovakia
- Height: 6 ft 0 in (183 cm)
- Weight: 187 lb (85 kg; 13 st 5 lb)
- Position: Defence
- Shot: Left
- Played for: HC Ocelari Trinec; HC Ytong Brno; HC Havířov Panthers; PSG Berani Zlín; HC Energie Karlovy Vary; HC Neftekhimik Nizhnekamsk; HC Kometa Brno
- National team: Czech Republic
- Playing career: 1999–2021

David Nosek (born February 19, 1981) is a Czech former professional ice hockey defenceman. He played with HC Karlovy Vary in the Czech Extraliga during the 2010–11 Czech Extraliga season.

== Career statistics ==
			Regular season					Playoffs
Season	Team	League	GP	G	A	Pts	PIM	GP	G	A	Pts	PIM
1999–00	HC Ocelari Trinec U20	Czech U20	45	6	8	14	10	1	0	0	0	0
1999–00	HC Ocelari Trinec	Czech	7	0	1	1	2	3	0	0	0	0
2000–01	HC Ocelari Trinec U20	Czech U20	4	0	0	0	2	1	0	0	0	2
2000–01	HC Ocelari Trinec	Czech	28	0	1	1	28	—	—	—	—	—
2000–01	HC Ytong Brno	Czech2	9	0	0	0	4	—	—	—	—	—
2001–02	HC Ocelari Trinec U20	Czech U20	2	1	0	1	0	—	—	—	—	—
2001–02	HC Ocelari Trinec	Czech	50	4	6	10	16	6	1	0	1	4
2002–03	HC Ocelari Trinec	Czech	36	1	6	7	22	—	—	—	—	—
2002–03	HC Havirov Panthers	Czech	8	0	0	0	12	—	—	—	—	—
2003–04	HC Hame Zlin	Czech	51	2	4	6	18	17	0	4	4	4
2004–05	HC Hame Zlin	Czech	52	2	6	8	26	17	0	1	1	31
2005–06	HC Hame Zlin	Czech	52	5	2	7	32	6	0	0	0	2
2006–07	HC Hame Zlin	Czech	50	6	15	21	48	5	2	0	2	14
2007–08	HC Zlin	Czech	46	6	7	13	74	—	—	—	—	—
2008–09	HC Zlin	Czech	52	6	7	13	40	5	1	1	2	4
2009–10	HC Zlin	Czech	44	2	10	12	42	—	—	—	—	—
2009–10	HC Energie Karlovy Vary	Czech	8	0	2	2	2	—	—	—	—	—
2010–11	HC Energie Karlovy Vary	Czech	39	9	11	20	30	5	1	0	1	0
2011–12	HC Energie Karlovy Vary	Czech	28	7	7	14	32	—	—	—	—	—
2011–12	HC Neftekhimik Nizhnekamsk	KHL	11	2	1	3	12	—	—	—	—	—
2012–13	HC Energie Karlovy Vary	Czech	46	13	22	35	38	—	—	—	—	—
2013–14	HC Kometa Brno	Czech	27	2	3	5	22	—	—	—	—	—
2013–14	HC Ocelari Trinec	Czech	16	3	5	8	2	11	2	3	5	4
2014–15	HC Ocelari Trinec	Czech	46	5	18	23	24	8	0	0	0	2
2015–16	HC Ocelari Trinec	Czech	48	7	7	14	14	5	1	1	2	0
2016–17	HC Ocelari Trinec	Czech	48	4	9	13	32	6	0	1	1	0
2017–18	Berani Zlin	Czech	22	1	5	6	8	2	0	0	0	0
2018–19	Berani Zlin	Czech	50	5	9	14	18	5	0	2	2	0
2019–20	Berani Zlin	Czech	52	7	13	20	28	2	0	0	0	4
2020–21	Berani Zlin	Czech	46	2	9	11	18	—	—	—	—	—
Czech totals			954	99	185	284	628	99	8	12	20	63
