= Jan Hanzlík =

Czech ice hockey player (born 1982)

- Born: March 21, 1982 (age 44) Mladá Boleslav, Czechoslovakia
- Height: 5 ft 11 in (180 cm)
- Weight: 187 lb (85 kg; 13 st 5 lb)
- Position: Defence
- Shot: Left
- Played for: Kometa Brno; HC Sparta Praha; HC Berounští Medvědi; BK Mladá Boleslav
- NHL draft: Undrafted
- Playing career: 2000–2019

Jan Hanzlík (born March 21, 1982) is a Czech professional ice hockey player. He currently plays for BK Mladá Boleslav of the Czech Extraliga.

He previously played for HC Kometa Brno between 2013 and 2016 and HC Sparta Praha from 2003 to 2013.

== Career statistics ==
			Regular season					Playoffs
Season	Team	League	GP	G	A	Pts	PIM	GP	G	A	Pts	PIM
1999–00	HC Sparta Praha U20	Czech U20	43	2	9	11	69	—	—	—	—	—
2000–01	HC Sparta Praha U20	Czech U20	46	9	25	34	50	—	—	—	—	—
2000–01	HC Sparta Praha	Czech	7	0	0	0	2	3	0	0	0	0
2000–01	HC Mladá Boleslav	Czech3	6	0	0	0	21	—	—	—	—	—
2001–02	HC Sparta Praha U20	Czech U20	10	2	6	8	61	—	—	—	—	—
2001–02	HC Sparta Praha	Czech	34	3	2	5	28	10	0	0	0	6
2001–02	HC Berounští Medvědi	Czech2	5	0	0	0	6	—	—	—	—	—
2002–03	HC Sparta Praha U20	Czech U20	8	1	5	6	14	1	3	0	3	0
2002–03	HC Sparta Praha	Czech	39	0	2	2	14	7	0	2	2	8
2003–04	HC Sparta Praha	Czech	50	2	5	7	65	11	0	1	1	12
2004–05	HC Sparta Praha	Czech	52	4	7	11	95	5	0	0	0	6
2005–06	HC Sparta Praha	Czech	51	5	7	12	68	17	1	0	1	30
2006–07	HC Sparta Praha	Czech	51	6	2	8	88	16	0	1	1	12
2007–08	HC Sparta Praha	Czech	52	4	5	9	97	4	0	0	0	2
2008–09	HC Sparta Praha	Czech	52	2	14	16	54	11	0	4	4	18
2009–10	HC Sparta Praha	Czech	52	4	10	14	99	7	0	2	2	8
2010–11	HC Sparta Praha	Czech	52	3	11	14	34	—	—	—	—	—
2011–12	HC Sparta Praha	Czech	36	3	6	9	36	5	0	1	1	0
2012–13	HC Sparta Praha	Czech	29	1	3	4	12	7	0	0	0	0
2013–14	HC Kometa Brno	Czech	52	2	7	9	20	14	0	2	2	39
2014–15	HC Kometa Brno	Czech	52	3	16	19	58	12	0	3	3	10
2015–16	HC Kometa Brno	Czech	35	0	8	8	22	4	0	0	0	4
2016–17	BK Mladá Boleslav	Czech	52	0	12	12	22	5	0	1	1	4
2017–18	BK Mladá Boleslav	Czech	52	0	6	6	52	—	—	—	—	—
2018–19	BK Mladá Boleslav	Czech	24	0	5	5	20	—	—	—	—	—
Czech totals			824	42	128	170	886	138	1	17	18	159
