= Juraj Valach =

Slovak ice hockey player

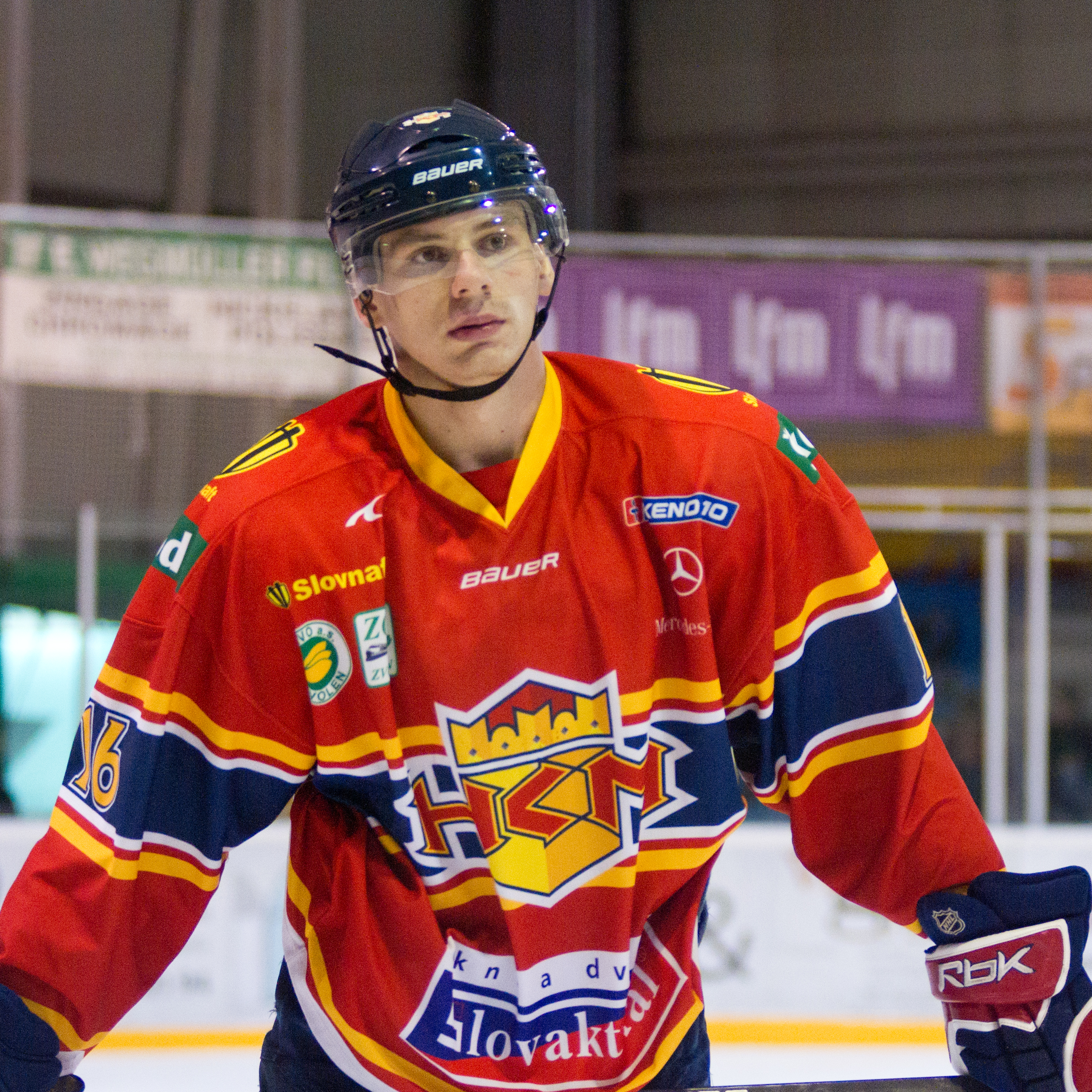
- Born: February 1, 1989 (age 37) Topoľčany, Czechoslovakia
- Height: 6 ft 8 in (203 cm)
- Weight: 227 lb (103 kg; 16 st 3 lb)
- Position: Defence
- Shoots: Right
- Slovak team Former teams: HK Spišská Nová Ves; HKM Zvolen; HC Kometa Brno; HC Slavia Praha; HC Slovan Bratislava; Piráti Chomutov; EHC Black Wings Linz
- National team: Slovakia
- NHL draft: Undrafted
- Playing career: 2006–present

Juraj Valach (born 1 February 1989) is a Slovak professional ice hockey defenceman currently playing for HK Spišská Nová Ves in the Slovak Extraliga.

== Career ==
After playing for Piráti Chomutov for four seasons in the Czech Extraliga, Valach became a free agent at the end of the 2018-19 season. He decided to sign his first contract in the EBEL and agreed to a one-year deal with EHC Black Wings Linz on 1 July 2019.

== Career statistics ==
=== Regular season and playoffs ===
			Regular season					Playoffs
Season	Team	League	GP	G	A	Pts	PIM	GP	G	A	Pts	PIM
2003–04	HKm Zvolen	SVK U18	20	0	1	1	4	—	—	—	—	—
2003–04	HKm Zvolen	SVK.2 U18	24	8	3	11	22	—	—	—	—	—
2004–05	HKm Zvolen	SVK U18	35	9	5	14	44	—	—	—	—	—
2004–05	HKm Zvolen	SVK.2 U18	4	2	3	5	0	—	—	—	—	—
2004–05	HKm Zvolen	SVK U20	16	0	1	1	6	—	—	—	—	—
2005–06	HKm Zvolen	SVK U18	18	1	11	12	53	—	—	—	—	—
2005–06	HKm Zvolen	SVK U20	40	7	7	14	54	2	0	0	0	0
2005–06	HKm Zvolen	SVK	1	0	0	0	0	—	—	—	—	—
2006–07	Tri–City Americans	WHL	58	7	23	30	75	6	1	1	2	12
2007–08	Vancouver Giants	WHL	3	1	3	4	6	—	—	—	—	—
2007–08	Regina Pats	WHL	38	6	11	17	44	—	—	—	—	—
2007–08	Red Deer Rebels	WHL	30	4	8	12	38	—	—	—	—	—
2008–09	HKm Zvolen	SVK U20	4	0	1	1	2	—	—	—	—	—
2008–09	HKm Zvolen	SVK	46	0	2	2	63	13	1	1	2	16
2008–09	HC 07 Detva	SVK.2	2	1	1	2	2	—	—	—	—	—
2009–10	HKm Zvolen	SVK	44	8	7	15	143	5	0	0	0	8
2010–11	HKm Zvolen	SVK	56	1	8	9	80	7	0	0	0	20
2011–12	HC Kometa Brno	ELH	24	1	3	4	53	—	—	—	—	—
2011–12	HC Slavia Praha	ELH	20	1	3	4	18	—	—	—	—	—
2012–13	HC Kometa Brno	ELH	46	2	5	7	22	—	—	—	—	—
2013–14	HC Slavia Praha	ELH	47	11	11	22	52	5	0	0	0	8
2014–15	HC Slavia Praha	ELH	43	6	7	13	68	—	—	—	—	—
2015–16	HC Slovan Bratislava	KHL	25	0	1	1	26	—	—	—	—	—
2015–16	Piráti Chomutov	ELH	19	2	2	4	20	5	0	0	0	12
2016–17	Piráti Chomutov	ELH	51	5	13	18	46	16	5	1	6	18
2017–18	Piráti Chomutov	ELH	52	2	11	13	89	—	—	—	—	—
2018–19	Piráti Chomutov	ELH	44	5	3	8	28	—	—	—	—	—
2019–20	EHC Liwest Black Wings Linz	AUT	32	1	8	9	30	—	—	—	—	—
2020–21	HC Slovan Bratislava	SVK	45	1	8	9	34	10	0	3	3	18
2021–22	HC Slovan Bratislava	SVK	46	2	12	14	56	16	2	6	8	16
2022–23	HC Slovan Bratislava	SVK	25	1	7	8	22	—	—	—	—	—
2022–23	HK Spišská Nová Ves	SVK	12	2	6	8	8	13	1	4	5	12
2023–24	HK Spišská Nová Ves	SVK	43	2	6	8	53	15	2	2	4	8
2024–25	HK Spišská Nová Ves	SVK	46	3	11	14	34	6	0	1	1	0
2025–26	HKm Zvolen	SVK	45	6	15	21	28	4	0	1	1	6
SVK totals			409	26	82	108	521	89	6	18	24	104
ELH totals			346	33	60	93	396	26	5	1	6	38

=== International ===
Year	Team	Event	Result	GP	G	A	Pts	PIM
2006	Slovakia	U17	9th	5	1	3	4	10
2006	Slovakia	WJC18	7th	6	0	0	0	8
2007	Slovakia	WJC	8th	6	0	0	0	8
2009	Slovakia	WJC	4th	7	0	3	3	16
2014	Slovakia	WC	9th	7	0	3	3	4
2018	Slovakia	OG	11th	3	0	0	0	2
Junior totals				24	1	6	7	42
Senior totals				10	0	3	3	6

== Awards and honors ==
Award	Year
Slovak
Champion	2022
