= Tomáš Mertl =

Czech ice hockey player (born 1986)

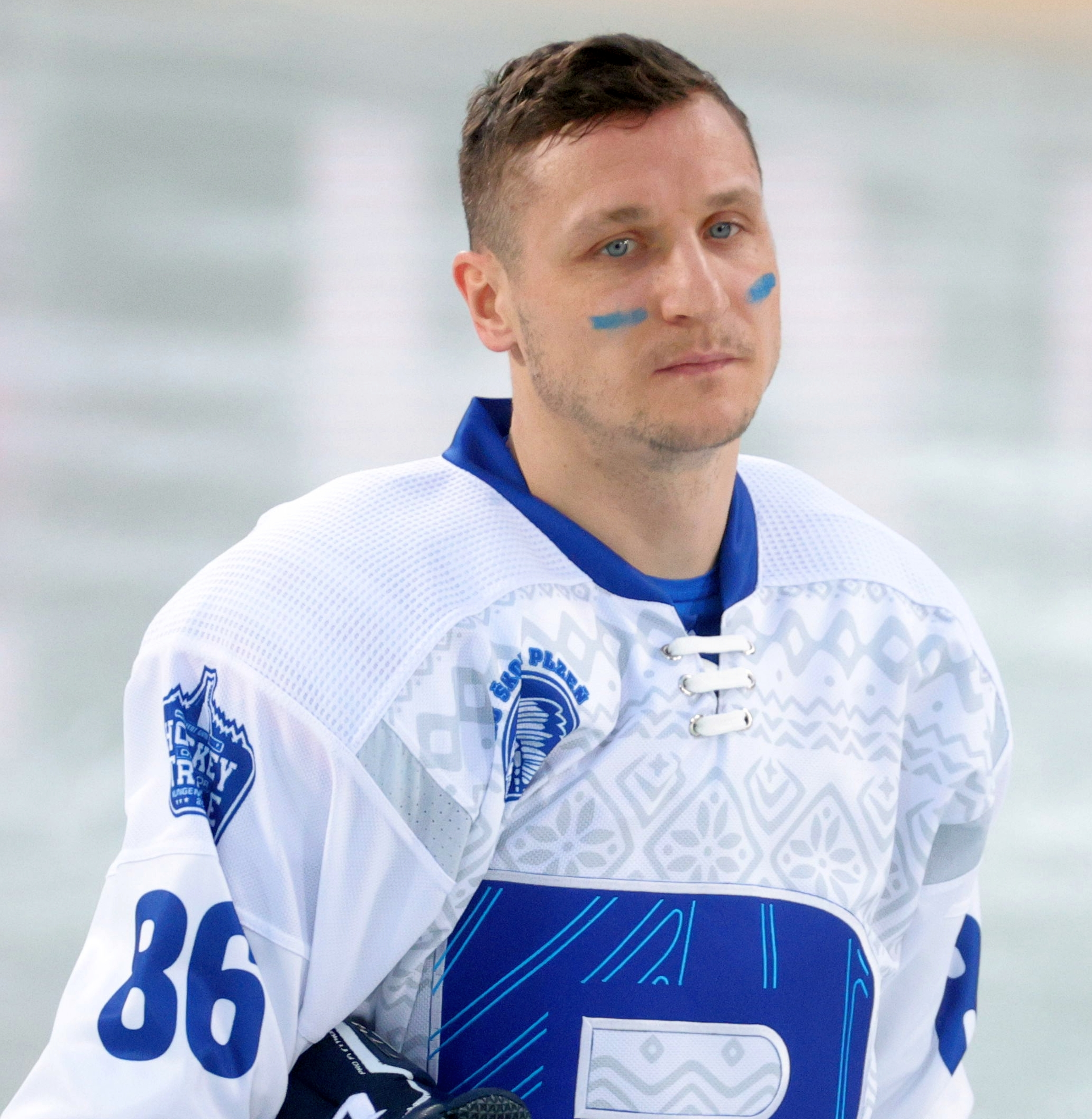
- Born: March 11, 1986 (age 40) České Budějovice, Czechoslovakia
- Height: 5 ft 9 in (175 cm)
- Weight: 181 lb (82 kg; 12 st 13 lb)
- Position: Forward
- Shoots: Left
- ELH team Former teams: HC Plzeň; HC České Budějovice; HK Hradec Kralove; Medveščak Zagreb; Salavat Yulaev Ufa; HC Kunlun Red Star
- National team: Czech Republic
- Playing career: 2004–present

Tomáš Mertl (born March 11, 1986) is a Czech professional ice hockey player currently with HC Plzeň of the Czech Extraliga. He originally played with HC České Budějovice in the Extraliga during the 2010–11 Czech Extraliga season before joining fellow ELH club, HK Hradec Kralove.

== Career statistics ==
=== Regular season and playoffs ===
| | | | Regular season | | | | | Playoffs |
| Season | Team | League | GP | G | A | Pts | PIM | GP | G | A | Pts | PIM |
|---|---|---|---|---|---|---|---|---|---|---|---|---|
| 2000–01 | HC České Budějovice | CZE U18 | 8 | 2 | 3 | 5 | 0 | — | — | — | — | — |
| 2001–02 | HC České Budějovice | CZE U18 | 45 | 23 | 24 | 47 | 67 | — | — | — | — | — |
| 2002–03 | HC České Budějovice | CZE U18 | 25 | 25 | 12 | 37 | 16 | 8 | 5 | 4 | 9 | 8 |
| 2002–03 | HC České Budějovice | CZE U20 | 4 | 1 | 0 | 1 | 0 | — | — | — | — | — |
| 2003–04 | HC České Budějovice | CZE U20 | 48 | 20 | 18 | 38 | 45 | — | — | — | — | — |
| 2003–04 | HC České Budějovice | ELH | 1 | 0 | 0 | 0 | 0 | — | — | — | — | — |
| 2004–05 | HC České Budějovice | CZE U20 | 32 | 13 | 12 | 25 | 8 | — | — | — | — | — |
| 2004–05 | HC České Budějovice | CZE.2 | 24 | 5 | 4 | 9 | 0 | 1 | 0 | 0 | 0 | 2 |
| 2004–05 | KLH Vajgar Jindřichův Hradec | CZE.3 | 9 | 6 | 2 | 8 | 6 | 7 | 4 | 0 | 4 | 0 |
| 2005–06 | HC České Budějovice | CZE U20 | 12 | 9 | 3 | 12 | 8 | 1 | 0 | 0 | 0 | 0 |
| 2005–06 | HC České Budějovice | ELH | 23 | 1 | 0 | 1 | 12 | 10 | 0 | 1 | 1 | 2 |
| 2005–06 | KLH Vajgar Jindřichův Hradec | CZE.2 | 32 | 7 | 6 | 13 | 12 | — | — | — | — | — |
| 2006–07 | HC Mountfield | ELH | 35 | 3 | 5 | 8 | 12 | 11 | 4 | 3 | 7 | 10 |
| 2006–07 | SK Horácká Slavia Třebíč | CZE.2 | 29 | 14 | 9 | 23 | 16 | — | — | — | — | — |
| 2007–08 | HC Mountfield | ELH | 51 | 5 | 1 | 6 | 34 | 9 | 1 | 0 | 1 | 4 |
| 2007–08 | BK Mladá Boleslav | CZE.2 | 5 | 2 | 2 | 4 | 2 | — | — | — | — | — |
| 2008–09 | HC Mountfield | ELH | 45 | 6 | 5 | 11 | 16 | — | — | — | — | — |
| 2008–09 | HC Tábor | CZE.3 | 4 | 2 | 1 | 3 | 2 | 7 | 8 | 6 | 14 | 18 |
| 2009–10 | HC Mountfield | ELH | 44 | 3 | 4 | 7 | 20 | — | — | — | — | — |
| 2009–10 | HC Tábor | CZE.2 | 4 | 4 | 2 | 6 | 4 | — | — | — | — | — |
| 2010–11 | HC Mountfield | ELH | 52 | 10 | 12 | 22 | 36 | 6 | 0 | 0 | 0 | 0 |
| 2011–12 | HC Mountfield | ELH | 47 | 7 | 3 | 10 | 24 | 5 | 0 | 2 | 2 | 0 |
| 2012–13 | HC Mountfield | ELH | 45 | 5 | 5 | 10 | 26 | 5 | 1 | 1 | 2 | 4 |
| 2013–14 | Mountfield HK | ELH | 52 | 14 | 21 | 35 | 78 | 6 | 1 | 2 | 3 | 12 |
| 2014–15 | Mountfield HK | ELH | 50 | 24 | 26 | 50 | 58 | 4 | 0 | 0 | 0 | 6 |
| 2015–16 | KHL Medveščak Zagreb | KHL | 55 | 11 | 21 | 32 | 38 | — | — | — | — | — |
| 2015–16 | Mountfield HK | ELH | 9 | 3 | 3 | 6 | 31 | 5 | 0 | 3 | 3 | 6 |
| 2016–17 | KHL Medveščak Zagreb | KHL | 43 | 7 | 7 | 14 | 32 | — | — | — | — | — |
| 2016–17 | Salavat Yulaev Ufa | KHL | 10 | 4 | 1 | 5 | 10 | 5 | 0 | 0 | 0 | 4 |
| 2017–18 | HC Škoda Plzeň | ELH | 50 | 30 | 27 | 57 | 59 | 10 | 2 | 4 | 6 | 0 |
| 2018–19 | Kunlun Red Star | KHL | 52 | 4 | 10 | 14 | 26 | — | — | — | — | — |
| 2019–20 | HC Škoda Plzeň | ELH | 48 | 16 | 24 | 40 | 42 | — | — | — | — | — |
| 2020–21 | HC Škoda Plzeň | ELH | 20 | 9 | 7 | 16 | 16 | 3 | 0 | 0 | 0 | 0 |
| 2021–22 | HC Škoda Plzeň | ELH | 53 | 13 | 23 | 36 | 65 | 4 | 2 | 0 | 2 | 12 |
| ELH totals | | | 625 | 149 | 166 | 315 | 529 | 78 | 11 | 16 | 27 | 56 |
| KHL totals | | | 160 | 26 | 39 | 65 | 106 | 5 | 0 | 0 | 0 | 4 |

=== International ===
| Year | Team | Event | GP | G | A | Pts | PIM |
|---|---|---|---|---|---|---|---|
| 2004 | Czech Republic | WJC18 | 1 | 0 | 0 | 0 | 0 |
| 2018 | Czech Republic | OG | 6 | 0 | 1 | 1 | 0 |
| Senior totals | | | 6 | 0 | 1 | 1 | 0 |
