= Jakub Čutta =

Czech ice hockey player (born 1981)

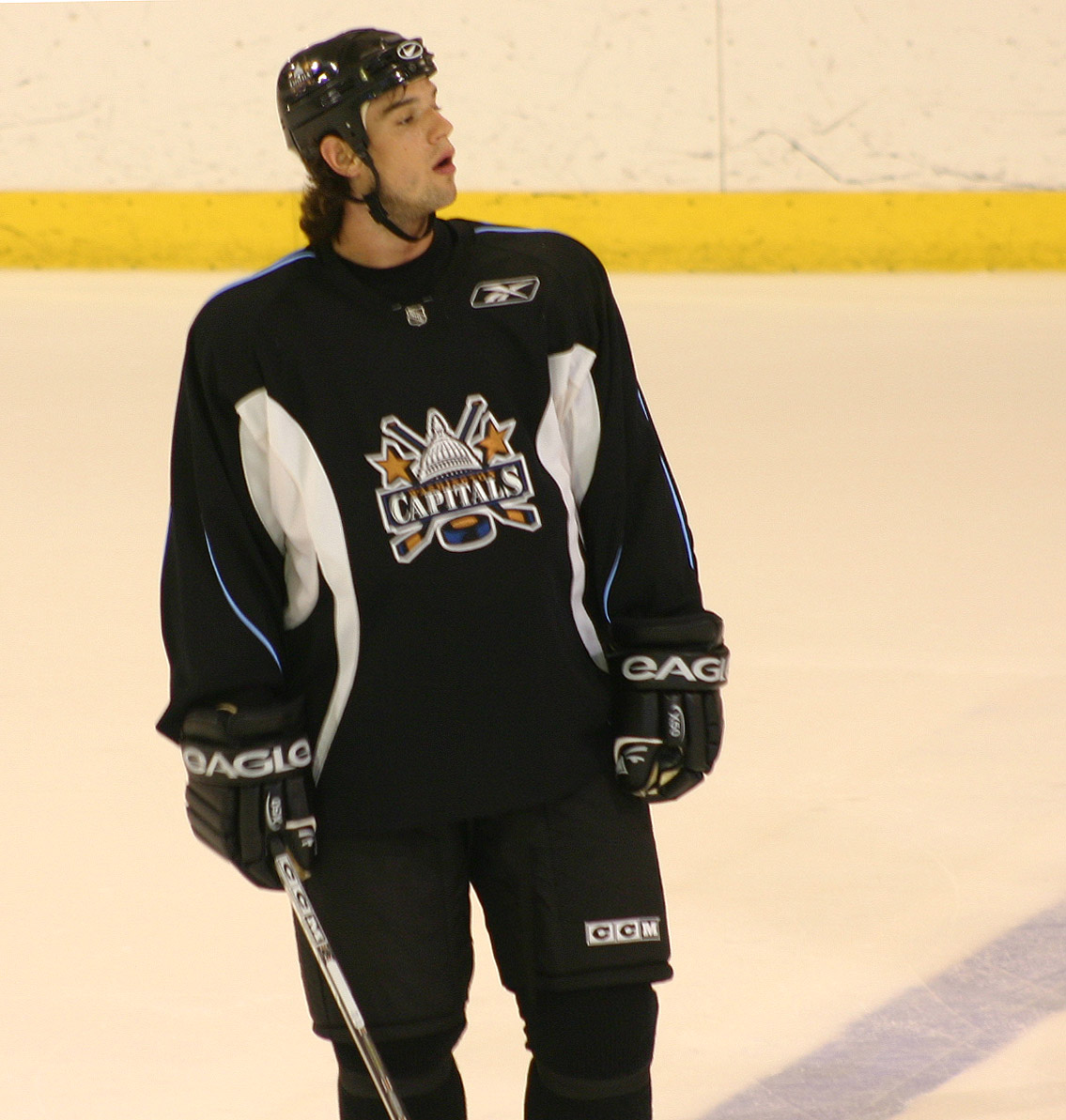
- Čutta in 2005 with the Washington Capitals
- Born: December 29, 1981 (age 44) Jablonec nad Nisou, Czechoslovakia
- Height: 6 ft 3 in (191 cm)
- Weight: 210 lb (95 kg; 15 st 0 lb)
- Position: Defence
- Shot: Left
- Played for: Washington Capitals; Portland Pirates; Hershey Bears; HC Energie Karlovy Vary; SaiPa
- NHL draft: 61st overall, 2000; Washington Capitals
- Playing career: 2001–2018

Jakub Čutta (born December 29, 1981) is a Czech former ice hockey defenceman. He played 8 games in the National Hockey League with the Washington Capitals from 2000 to 2004. The rest of his career, which lasted from 2000 to 2018, was mainly spent in the Czech Extraliga.

After three seasons with HC Energie Karlovy Vary, he joined BK Mladá Boleslav in May 2011.

== Career statistics ==
=== Regular season and playoffs ===
			Regular season					Playoffs
Season	Team	League	GP	G	A	Pts	PIM	GP	G	A	Pts	PIM
1997–98	HC Liberec	CZE U20	29	3	13	16	70	—	—	—	—	—
1998–99	Swift Current Broncos	WHL	59	3	3	6	63	—	—	—	—	—
1999–00	Swift Current Broncos	WHL	71	2	12	14	114	12	0	2	2	24
2000–01	Washington Capitals	NHL	3	0	0	0	0	—	—	—	—	—
2000–01	Swift Current Broncos	WHL	47	5	8	13	102	16	1	3	4	32
2001–02	Washington Capitals	NHL	2	0	0	0	0	—	—	—	—	—
2001–02	Portland Pirates	AHL	56	1	3	4	69	—	—	—	—	—
2002–03	Portland Pirates	AHL	66	3	12	15	106	3	0	0	0	2
2003–04	Washington Capitals	NHL	3	0	0	0	0	—	—	—	—	—
2003–04	Portland Pirates	AHL	59	1	5	6	58	7	2	0	2	7
2004–05	Portland Pirates	AHL	63	0	5	5	100	—	—	—	—	—
2005–06	Hershey Bears	AHL	51	1	2	3	84	21	2	3	5	38
2006–07	Bílí Tygři Liberec	CZE	37	0	2	2	99	6	0	1	1	16
2007–08	Neftekhimik Nizhnekamsk	RSL	12	0	0	0	33	—	—	—	—	—
2007–08	Traktor Chelyabinsk	RSL	17	0	4	4	46	—	—	—	—	—
2007–08	Traktor–2 Chelyabinsk	RUS-3	1	0	0	0	2	—	—	—	—	—
2008–09	HC Energie Karlovy Vary	CZE	34	2	3	5	62	16	0	0	0	20
2009–10	HC Energie Karlovy Vary	CZE	41	7	4	11	76	—	—	—	—	—
2010–11	HC Energie Karlovy Vary	CZE	49	3	8	11	88	5	0	0	0	22
2011–12	BK Mladá Boleslav	CZE	33	2	5	7	87	—	—	—	—	—
2012–13	Bílí Tygři Liberec	CZE	39	2	7	9	95	—	—	—	—	—
2013–14	Bílí Tygři Liberec	CZE	29	3	4	7	42	—	—	—	—	—
2013–14	SaiPa	FIN	10	0	1	1	12	6	0	1	1	4
2014–15	HC Dynamo Pardubice	CZE	20	2	1	3	24	7	0	0	0	18
2015–16	VIK Västerås HK	SWE-2	31	0	3	3	59	—	—	—	—	—
2017–18	HC Verva Litvínov	CZE	9	0	1	1	20	—	—	—	—	—
CZE totals			291	21	35	56	593	34	0	1	1	76
NHL totals			8	0	0	0	0	—	—	—	—	—

=== International ===
Year	Team	Event	GP	G	A	Pts	PIM
2001	Czech Republic	WJC	7	0	1	1	24
Junior totals			7	0	1	1	24
