= Ronald Knot =

Czech ice hockey player (born 1994)

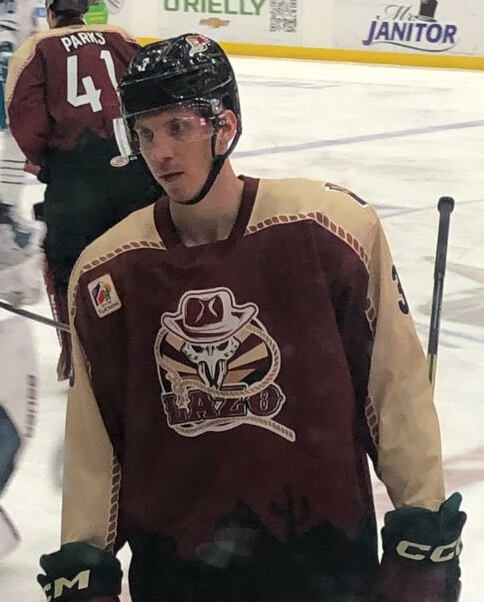
- Knot with the Tucson Roadrunners in 2023
- Born: August 3, 1994 (age 31) Prague, Czech Republic
- Height: 6 ft 3 in (191 cm)
- Weight: 208 lb (94 kg; 14 st 12 lb)
- Position: Defence
- Shoots: Right
- Extraliga team Former teams: HC Slavia Praha; BK Mladá Boleslav; Piráti Chomutov; HC Bílí Tygři Liberec; Neftekhimik Nizhnekamsk; HIFK
- National team: Czech Republic
- NHL draft: Undrafted
- Playing career: 2012–present

Ronald Knot (born August 3, 1994) is a Czech professional ice hockey player who currently plays for HC Sparta Praha of the Czech Extraliga.

== Playing career ==
Knot made his Czech Extraliga debut playing with HC Slavia Praha during the 2012–13 Czech Extraliga season and has also played for BK Mladá Boleslav and Piráti Chomutov.

Following two seasons with HC Bílí Tygři Liberec, Knot left the ELH for the first time in his professional career, agreeing to a one-year contract with Russian club HC Neftekhimik Nizhnekamsk of the Kontinental Hockey League (KHL), on 18 May 2021.

In the following 2021–22 season, Knot added size and a physical presence to the Neftekhimik blueline, contributing 4 goals and 17 points through 49 regular-season games. He made three playoff appearances as Neftekhimik bowed out in the first-round sweep to Traktor Chelyabinsk.

As a free agent following the conclusion of his contract with Neftekhimik Nizhnekamsk, Knot left the KHL and secured a one-year, two-way contract with the Arizona Coyotes of the National Hockey League (NHL) on 1 June 2022. In the 2022–23 season, Knot played exclusively with the Coyotes American Hockey League (AHL) affiliate, the Tucson Roadrunners. As a fixture on the blueline, he recorded 4 goals and 17 points through 63 regular-season games.

As a pending free agent from the Coyotes, without having featured in the NHL, Knot opted to return to his native Czech Republic, linking up with former club HC Bílí Tygři Liberec of the ELH, on a three-year contract on 9 May 2023.

After just one season in his return to the ELH, Knot opted to terminate his agreement with Liberec and signed a one-year deal with Finnish club, HIFK of the Liiga, on 16 May 2024.

Knot signed with HC Sparta Praha on 11 January 2026.

== Career statistics ==
=== Regular season and playoffs ===
| | | | Regular season | | | | | Playoffs |
| Season | Team | League | GP | G | A | Pts | PIM | GP | G | A | Pts | PIM |
|---|---|---|---|---|---|---|---|---|---|---|---|---|
| 2008–09 | HC Slavia Praha | CZE U18 | 14 | 0 | 1 | 1 | 4 | 4 | 0 | 0 | 0 | 0 |
| 2009–10 | HC Slavia Praha | CZE U18 | 42 | 2 | 3 | 5 | 30 | 5 | 1 | 1 | 2 | 2 |
| 2010–11 | HC Slavia Praha | CZE U18 | 39 | 5 | 10 | 15 | 20 | 1 | 0 | 0 | 0 | 0 |
| 2010–11 | HC Slavia Praha | CZE U20 | 13 | 1 | 2 | 3 | 10 | — | — | — | — | — |
| 2011–12 | HC Slavia Praha | CZE U18 | 16 | 3 | 3 | 6 | 6 | — | — | — | — | — |
| 2011–12 | HC Slavia Praha | CZE U20 | 27 | 1 | 0 | 1 | 4 | 2 | 0 | 0 | 0 | 0 |
| 2012–13 | HC Slavia Praha | CZE U20 | 32 | 7 | 9 | 16 | 45 | — | — | — | — | — |
| 2012–13 | HC Slavia Praha | ELH | 1 | 0 | 0 | 0 | 0 | — | — | — | — | — |
| 2013–14 | HC Slavia Praha | CZE U20 | 15 | 2 | 9 | 11 | 10 | 3 | 1 | 0 | 1 | 16 |
| 2013–14 | HC Slavia Praha | ELH | 32 | 0 | 2 | 2 | 10 | 5 | 0 | 1 | 1 | 0 |
| 2014–15 | HC Slavia Praha | CZE U20 | 4 | 0 | 3 | 3 | 8 | — | — | — | — | — |
| 2014–15 | HC Slavia Praha | ELH | 34 | 2 | 0 | 2 | 53 | — | — | — | — | — |
| 2015–16 | HC Slavia Praha | Czech.1 | 47 | 5 | 17 | 22 | 12 | 18 | 2 | 6 | 8 | 10 |
| 2016–17 | HC Slavia Praha | Czech.1 | 49 | 5 | 10 | 15 | 32 | 9 | 0 | 4 | 4 | 10 |
| 2017–18 | BK Mladá Boleslav | ELH | 26 | 1 | 1 | 2 | 16 | — | — | — | — | — |
| 2017–18 | HC Slavia Praha | Czech.1 | 1 | 0 | 0 | 0 | 0 | — | — | — | — | — |
| 2017–18 | Piráti Chomutov | ELH | 21 | 1 | 4 | 5 | 32 | — | — | — | — | — |
| 2018–19 | Piráti Chomutov | ELH | 51 | 6 | 11 | 17 | 18 | — | — | — | — | — |
| 2019–20 | Bílí Tygři Liberec | ELH | 50 | 4 | 9 | 13 | 38 | — | — | — | — | — |
| 2019–20 | HC Benátky nad Jizerou | Czech.1 | 1 | 1 | 0 | 1 | 0 | — | — | — | — | — |
| 2020–21 | Bílí Tygři Liberec | ELH | 51 | 5 | 11 | 16 | 36 | 16 | 1 | 6 | 7 | 6 |
| 2021–22 | Neftekhimik Nizhnekamsk | KHL | 49 | 4 | 13 | 17 | 26 | 3 | 0 | 0 | 0 | 0 |
| 2022–23 | Tucson Roadrunners | AHL | 64 | 4 | 13 | 17 | 63 | 2 | 0 | 1 | 1 | 2 |
| 2023–24 | Bílí Tygři Liberec | ELH | 40 | 5 | 9 | 14 | 41 | 8 | 0 | 1 | 1 | 4 |
| 2024–25 | HIFK | Liiga | 50 | 8 | 12 | 20 | 24 | 2 | 0 | 0 | 0 | 0 |
| ELH totals | | | 306 | 24 | 47 | 71 | 244 | 29 | 1 | 8 | 9 | 10 |
| KHL totals | | | 49 | 4 | 13 | 17 | 26 | 3 | 0 | 0 | 0 | 0 |

=== International ===
| Year | Team | Event | Result | GP | G | A | Pts | PIM |
|---|---|---|---|---|---|---|---|---|
| 2011 | Czech Republic | IH18 | 6th | 4 | 0 | 1 | 1 | 0 |
| 2012 | Czech Republic | U18 | 8th | 6 | 0 | 0 | 0 | 6 |
| 2014 | Czech Republic | WJC | 6th | 4 | 0 | 0 | 0 | 6 |
| 2022 | Czech Republic | OG | 9th | 4 | 0 | 1 | 1 | 2 |
| 2023 | Czech Republic | WC | 8th | 4 | 0 | 0 | 0 | 0 |
| Junior totals | | | | 14 | 0 | 1 | 1 | 12 |
| Senior totals | | | | 8 | 0 | 1 | 1 | 2 |
