= Lukáš Vantuch =

Czech ice hockey player

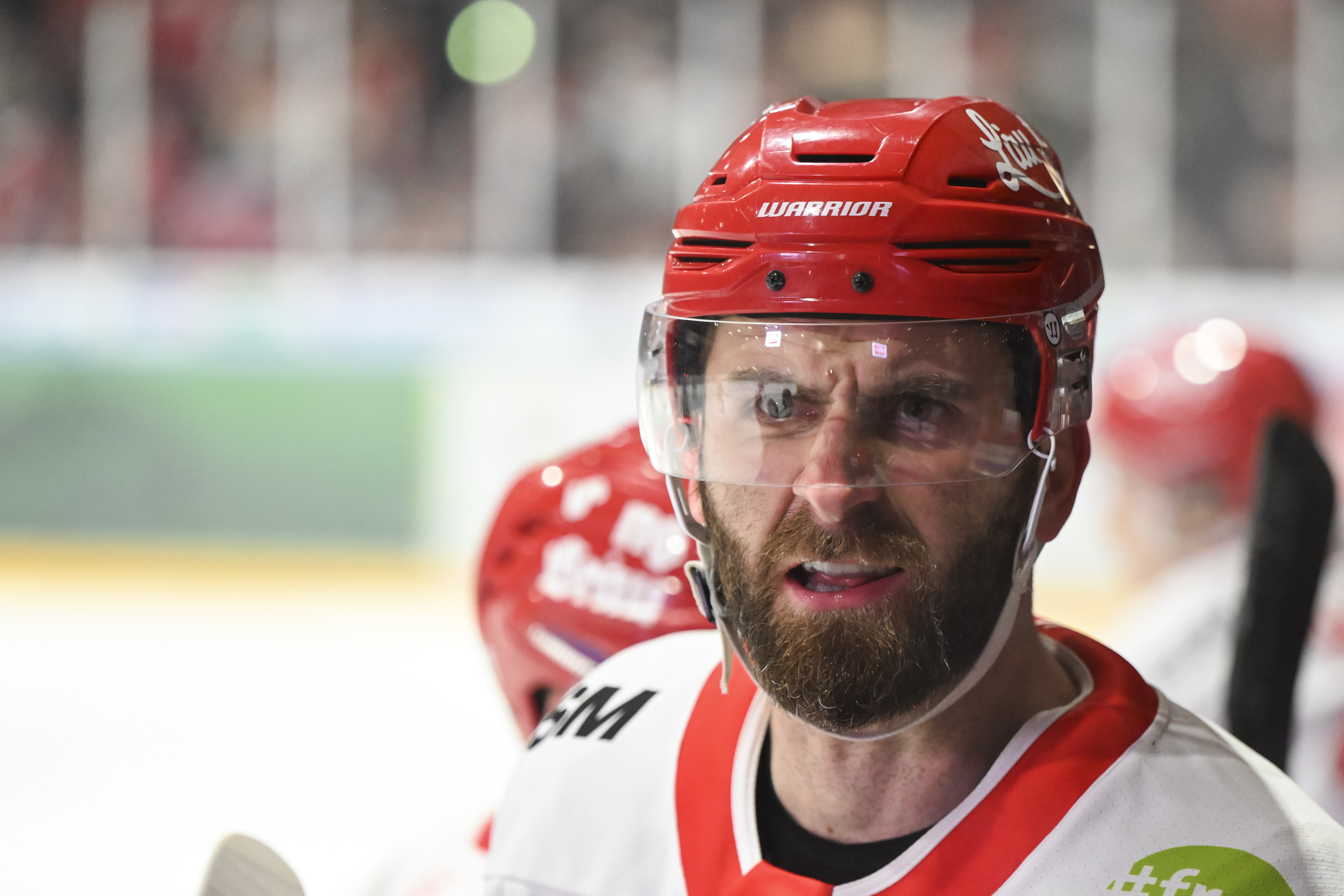
- Born: 20 July 1987 (age 37); Jihlava, Czechoslovakia
- Height: 1.96 m (6 ft 5 in)
- Weight: 101 kg (223 lb; 15 st 13 lb)
- Position: Forward
- Shoots: Left
- DEL2 team Former teams: Selber Wölfe; HC Bílí Tygři Liberec (Czech Extraliga)
- NHL draft: 172nd overall, 2005; Boston Bruins
- Playing career: 2005–present

Lukáš Vantuch (born 20 July 1987 in Jihlava) is a Czech professional ice hockey player.

Vantuch previously played for Calgary Hitmen, Lethbridge Hurricanes, HC Vrchlabí, HC Benátky nad Jizerou and HC Bílí Tygři Liberec.

== Career statistics ==
=== Regular season and playoffs ===
			Regular season					Playoffs
Season	Team	League	GP	G	A	Pts	PIM	GP	G	A	Pts	PIM
2002–03	Bílí Tygři Liberec	CZE U18	38	11	12	23	36	—	—	—	—	—
2002–03	Bílí Tygři Liberec	CZE U20	1	0	0	0	2	—	—	—	—	—
2003–04	Bílí Tygři Liberec	CZE U18	32	16	19	35	75	—	—	—	—	—
2003–04	Bílí Tygři Liberec	CZE U20	1	0	0	0	0	—	—	—	—	—
2004–05	Bílí Tygři Liberec	CZE U20	45	16	20	36	58	5	0	3	3	12
2005–06	Calgary Hitmen	WHL	68	4	15	19	70	13	0	1	1	6
2006–07	Lethbridge Hurricanes	WHL	58	6	15	21	67	—	—	—	—	—
2007–08	Bílí Tygři Liberec	ELH	37	3	1	4	30	—	—	—	—	—
2007–08	HC Vrchlabí	CZE.2	17	5	6	11	18	8	4	2	6	26
2008–09	Bílí Tygři Liberec	ELH	29	3	3	6	18	3	0	0	0	0
2008–09	HC Benátky nad Jizerou	CZE.2	32	6	11	17	73	1	0	2	2	6
2009–10	Bílí Tygři Liberec	ELH	29	1	4	5	22	4	0	0	0	2
2009–10	HC Benátky nad Jizerou	CZE.2	6	4	3	7	8	—	—	—	—	—
2010–11	Bílí Tygři Liberec	ELH	30	3	3	6	12	7	1	1	2	4
2010–11	HC Benátky nad Jizerou	CZE.2	10	3	9	12	31	—	—	—	—	—
2011–12	Bílí Tygři Liberec	ELH	52	9	5	14	79	11	4	2	6	20
2012–13	Bílí Tygři Liberec	ELH	31	1	4	5	26	—	—	—	—	—
2012–13	HC Sparta Praha	ELH	5	0	1	1	10	—	—	—	—	—
2012–13	HC Benátky nad Jizerou	CZE.2	2	0	0	0	12	—	—	—	—	—
2013–14	EV Landshut	GER.2	55	17	32	49	68	14	5	7	12	55
2014–15	EV Landshut	GER.2	6	0	3	3	0	—	—	—	—	—
2014–15	Mountfield HK	ELH	25	5	1	6	42	4	0	2	2	2
2015–16	Mountfield HK	ELH	22	1	1	2	18	5	0	0	0	43
2015–16	HC Stadion Litoměřice	CZE.2	17	3	8	11	10	—	—	—	—	—
2015–16	HC Verva Litvínov	ELH	10	0	0	0	10	—	—	—	—	—
2016–17	Bílí Tygři Liberec	ELH	47	4	6	10	26	16	1	4	5	28
2017–18	Bílí Tygři Liberec	ELH	29	0	2	2	28	—	—	—	—	—
2017–18	HC Benátky nad Jizerou	CZE.2	3	1	2	3	4	—	—	—	—	—
2017–18	Piráti Chomutov	ELH	5	1	1	2	4	—	—	—	—	—
2018–19	Piráti Chomutov	ELH	48	5	15	20	42	—	—	—	—	—
2019–20	Eispiraten Crimmitschau	GER.2	32	4	11	15	42	—	—	—	—	—
2020–21	Eispiraten Crimmitschau	GER.2	22	10	11	21	18	—	—	—	—	—
2021–22	Tölzer Löwen	GER.2	7	2	6	8	6	—	—	—	—	—
2021–22	Selber Wölfe	GER.2	34	6	13	19	12	—	—	—	—	—
ELH totals			399	36	47	83	367	53	6	9	15	99
CZE.2 totals			87	22	39	61	156	9	4	4	8	32
GER.2 totals			154	39	76	115	146	14	5	7	12	55

=== International ===
Year	Team	Event	GP	G	A	Pts	PIM
2004	Czech Republic	U18	5	1
2007	Czech Republic	WJC	4	0	0	0	0
Junior totals			4	0	0	0	0
