= Ivan Huml =

Czech ice hockey player

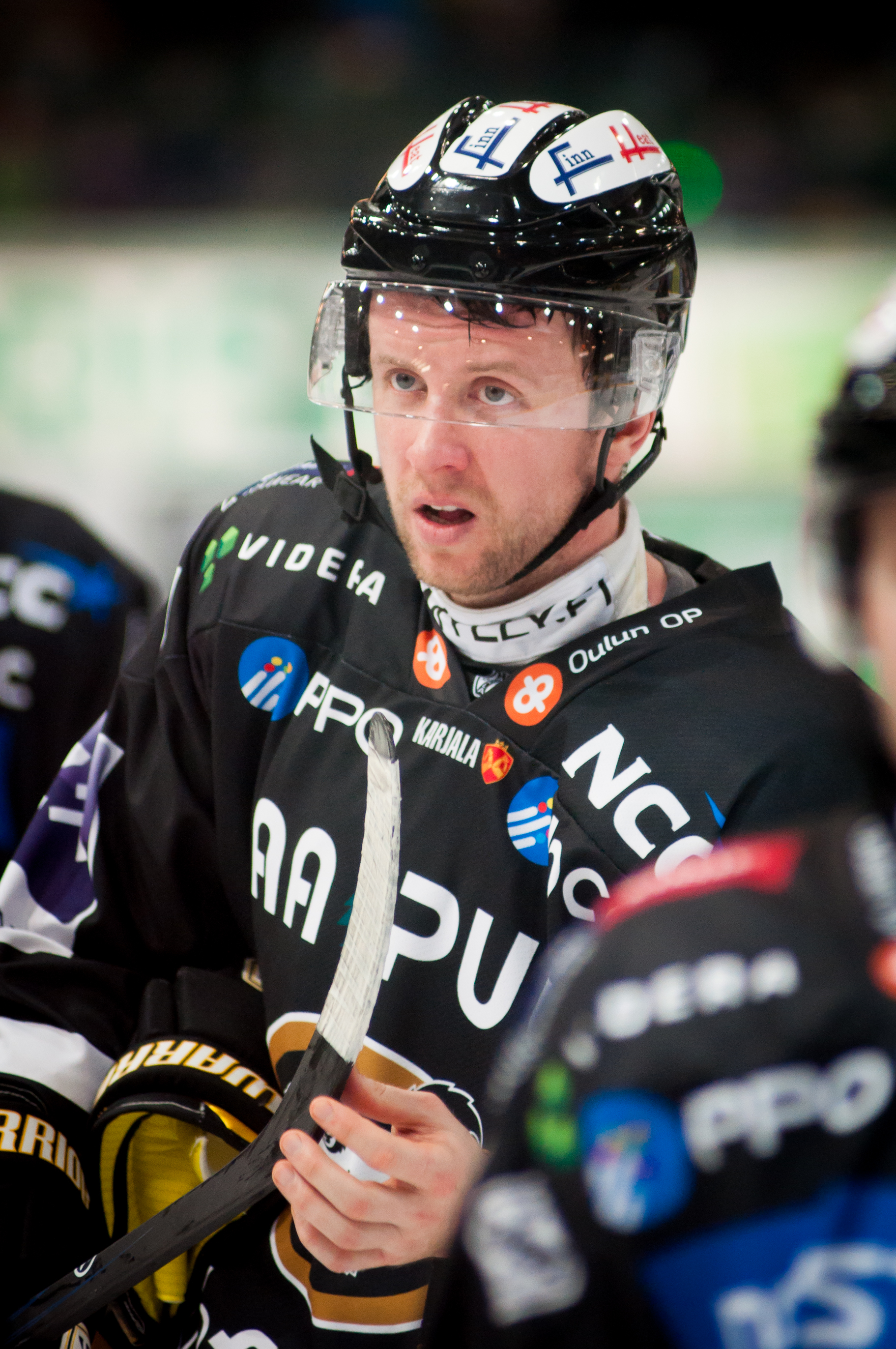
- Huml in 2012
- Born: September 6, 1981 (age 44) Kladno, Czechoslovakia
- Height: 6 ft 2 in (188 cm)
- Weight: 202 lb (92 kg; 14 st 6 lb)
- Position: Centre
- Shot: Left
- Played for: HC Kladno; Boston Bruins; TPS; Mora IK; HC Mountfield; HC Kometa Brno; Kärpät; Piráti Chomutov
- NHL draft: 59th overall, 2000; Boston Bruins
- Playing career: 1997–2020

Ivan Huml (born September 6, 1981) is a retired Czech professional ice hockey player whose career spanned over a decade in both North America and Europe. Selected 59th overall by the Boston Bruins in the second round of the 2000 NHL entry draft, he went on to play 49 regular‑season games with the Bruins over three seasons, recording 6 goals, 12 assists, and 18 points, along with 36 penalty minutes. After his time in the NHL, Huml continued his career in several elite European leagues, including the Czech Extraliga, Finland's SM‑liiga, and Sweden's Elitserien.

== Playing career ==
Huml began his professional hockey journey in North America, spending his early years with the Providence Bruins, the AHL affiliate of the Boston Bruins. In 2004, he chose to return to his home country, joining HC Rabat Kladno in the Czech Extraliga. Seeking new challenges, Huml then ventured abroad, signing with TPS in Finland's SM-liiga. His career path then took him to Sweden's top division, the Elitserien, where he played several strong seasons with Mora IK until 2008. That same year, he returned once again to the Czech Republic to join HC Mountfield. During the 2009–10 campaign, Huml was loaned midseason to HC Kometa Brno, where his performance earned him a permanent spot for the 2010–11 season. His consistent play caught the attention of Finnish club Oulun Kärpät, and in January 2011 he signed with them, embarking on a highly successful six‑year stint that included two league championships. After concluding his tenure with Kärpät in 2016, Huml returned home once more, closing out his professional career with Piráti Chomutov in the Czech Extraliga.

== Career statistics ==
=== Regular season and playoffs ===
			Regular season					Playoffs
Season	Team	League	GP	G	A	Pts	PIM	GP	G	A	Pts	PIM
1996–97	HC Kladno	CZE U20	37	16	3	19	—	—	—	—	—	—
1997–98	HC Velvana Kladno	CZE U20	31	30	21	51	—	—	—	—	—	—
1997–98	HC Velvana Kladno	CZE	1	0	0	0	0	—	—	—	—	—
1998–99	HC Velvana Kladno	CZE U20	18	6	6	12	—	—	—	—	—	—
1998–99	Langley Hornets	BCHL	33	23	17	40	41	4	2	3	5	4
1999–00	Langley Hornets	BCHL	49	53	51	104	72	—	—	—	—	—
2000–01	Providence Bruins	AHL	79	13	6	19	28	17	0	0	0	2
2001–02	Boston Bruins	NHL	1	0	1	1	0	—	—	—	—	—
2001–02	Providence Bruins	AHL	76	28	19	47	75	2	0	0	0	0
2002–03	Boston Bruins	NHL	41	6	11	17	30	—	—	—	—	—
2002–03	Providence Bruins	AHL	30	10	15	25	42	—	—	—	—	—
2003–04	Boston Bruins	NHL	7	0	0	0	0	—	—	—	—	—
2003–04	Providence Bruins	NHL	52	15	16	31	51	1	0	0	0	0
2004–05	HC Rabat Kladno	CZE	3	0	0	0	2	1	0	0	0	0
2005–06	HC Rabat Kladno	CZE	42	5	12	17	62	—	—	—	—	—
2005–06	TPS	SM-liiga	15	3	6	9	22	2	0	0	0	0
2006–07	TPS	SM-liiga	21	9	9	18	42	—	—	—	—	—
2006–07	Mora IK	SEL	32	5	7	12	24	4	0	1	1	0
2007–08	Mora IK	SEL	48	13	10	23	32	—	—	—	—	—
2008–09	HC Mountfield	CZE	52	16	13	29	50	—	—	—	—	—
2009–10	HC Mountfield	CZE	9	1	2	3	16	—	—	—	—	—
2009–10	HC Kometa Brno	CZE	42	8	13	21	24	—	—	—	—	—
2010–11	HC Kometa Brno	CZE	44	6	8	14	28	—	—	—	—	—
2010–11	Kärpät	SM-liiga	14	5	8	13	10	3	0	3	3	6
2011–12	Kärpät	SM-liiga	54	21	25	46	58	9	1	5	6	33
2012–13	Kärpät	SM-liiga	57	16	39	55	79	3	1	2	3	2
2013–14	Kärpät	Liiga	57	11	38	49	95	16	4	5	9	2
2014–15	Kärpät	Liiga	52	5	32	37	48	19	2	3	5	18
2015–16	Kärpät	Liiga	55	9	12	21	24	8	1	0	1	27
2016–17	Piráti Chomutov	CZE	51	18	22	40	56	17	5	11	16	8
2017–18	Piráti Chomutov	CZE	52	12	15	27	48	—	—	—	—	—
2018–19	Piráti Chomutov	CZE	27	4	2	6	16	—	—	—	—	—
2019–20	HC Řisuty	CZE-3	5	1	2	3	10	—	—	—	—	—
CZE totals			323	70	87	157	302	18	5	11	16	8
NHL totals			49	6	12	18	36	—	—	—	—	—
SM-liiga/Liiga totals			325	79	169	248	378	60	9	18	27	88

=== International ===
Year	Team	Event	GP	G	A	Pts	PIM
1999	Czech Republic	WJC18	7	0	0	0	0
Junior totals			7	0	0	0	0
