= Marek Kvapil =

Czech ice hockey player (born 1985)

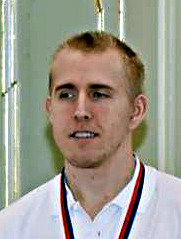
- Born: 5 January 1985 (age 41) Ilava, TCH
- Height: 5 ft 11 in (180 cm)
- Weight: 192 lb (87 kg; 13 st 10 lb)
- Position: Right wing
- Shot: Right
- ELH team Former teams: HC Sparta Praha; HC Slavia Praha; Springfield Falcons; Norfolk Admirals; HC Vítkovice; HC Kometa Brno; Dynamo Moscow; Severstal Cherepovets; KHL Medveščak Zagreb; HC Neftekhimik Nizhnekamsk; Amur Khabarovsk; HC Bílí Tygři Liberec
- National team: Czech Republic
- NHL draft: 163rd overall, 2005; Tampa Bay Lightning
- Playing career: 2005–2020

Marek Kvapil (born 5 January 1985) is a Czech professional ice hockey player who is currently playing for HC Sparta Praha of the Czech Extraliga (ELH). He has won the Gagarin Cup twice with Dynamo in 2012 and 2013. Although born in the Slovak city of Ilava, Kvapil has represented the Czech Republic in various international competitions.

== Playing career ==
After training in HC Slavia Praha's development program, Kvapil moved to North America after being drafted by the Saginaw Spirit in the first round (11th overall) of the 2004 CHL Import Draft. He was drafted the following year by the Tampa Bay Lightning, though would never play for the team. After spending three years in their farm system, Kvapil returned to Europe in 2008 to continue his career.

On 7 April 2017, Kvapil agreed to return to the KHL in signing a one-year contract as a free agent with Amur Khabarovsk. In the 2017–18 season, Kvapil contributed with just 1 goal in 11 games before ending his brief stint with Amur in returning to the Czech Extraliga with HC Bílí Tygři Liberec on a three-year contract on 10 November 2017.

== Career statistics ==
=== Regular season and playoffs ===
			Regular season					Playoffs
Season	Team	League	GP	G	A	Pts	PIM	GP	G	A	Pts	PIM
2001–02	Dukla Trenčín	SVK U18	—	—	—	—	—	—	—	—	—	—
2001–02	HC Slavia Praha	CZE U18	9	7	6	13	0	2	0	0	0	0
2002–03	HC Slavia Praha	CZE U20	33	9	4	13	6	2	0	0	0	0
2003–04	HC Slavia Praha	CZE U20	42	19	17	36	43	2	1	0	1	0
2003–04	HC Slavia Praha	ELH	11	0	0	0	0	—	—	—	—	—
2003–04	HC Kometa Brno	CZE.2	4	0	2	2	4	—	—	—	—	—
2004–05	HC Slavia Praha	CZE U20	8	6	4	10	8	—	—	—	—	—
2004–05	Saginaw Spirit	OHL	53	25	37	62	14	—	—	—	—	—
2005–06	Springfield Falcons	AHL	79	18	27	45	24	—	—	—	—	—
2006–07	Springfield Falcons	AHL	72	12	15	27	33	—	—	—	—	—
2006–07	Johnstown Chiefs	ECHL	7	3	8	11	2	2	1	1	2	0
2007–08	Norfolk Admirals	AHL	24	2	7	9	2	—	—	—	—	—
2007–08	Mississippi Sea Wolves	ECHL	25	9	15	24	9	3	2	3	5	2
2008–09	HC Vítkovice Steel	ELH	46	10	12	22	28	10	5	2	7	4
2009–10	HC Vítkovice Steel	ELH	50	19	22	41	18	16	3	3	6	0
2010–11	HC Kometa Brno	ELH	50	12	34	46	12	—	—	—	—	—
2011–12	Dynamo Moscow	KHL	53	12	17	29	34	21	8	4	12	4
2012–13	Dynamo Moscow	KHL	45	8	9	17	22	21	8	7	15	8
2013–14	Dynamo Moscow	KHL	39	6	9	15	24	5	1	0	1	0
2014–15	Severstal Cherepovets	KHL	51	10	14	24	12	—	—	—	—	—
2015–16	KHL Medveščak Zagreb	KHL	41	10	18	28	19	—	—	—	—	—
2015–16	Neftekhimik Nizhnekamsk	KHL	17	1	8	9	12	2	0	0	0	2
2016–17	HC Kometa Brno	ELH	49	15	25	40	30	14	4	6	10	2
2017–18	Amur Khabarovsk	KHL	11	1	0	1	0	—	—	—	—	—
2017–18	Bílí Tygři Liberec	ELH	32	13	20	33	2	10	7	2	9	0
2018–19	Bílí Tygři Liberec	ELH	47	25	32	57	12	16	3	10	13	2
2019–20	HC Sparta Praha	ELH	4	0	3	3	4	—	—	—	—	—
ELH totals			288	94	148	242	106	66	22	23	45	4
AHL totals			175	32	49	81	59	—	—	—	—	—
KHL totals			247	48	75	123	123	49	17	11	28	14

=== International ===
Year	Team	Event	Result	GP	G	A	Pts	PIM
2005	Czech Republic	WJC	3rd place, bronze medalist(s)	7	2	3	5	0
2010	Czech Republic	WC	1st place, gold medalist(s)	8	0	0	0	0
Junior totals				7	2	3	5	0
Senior totals				8	0	0	0	0
