= Martin Růžička =

Czech professional ice hockey player (born 1985)

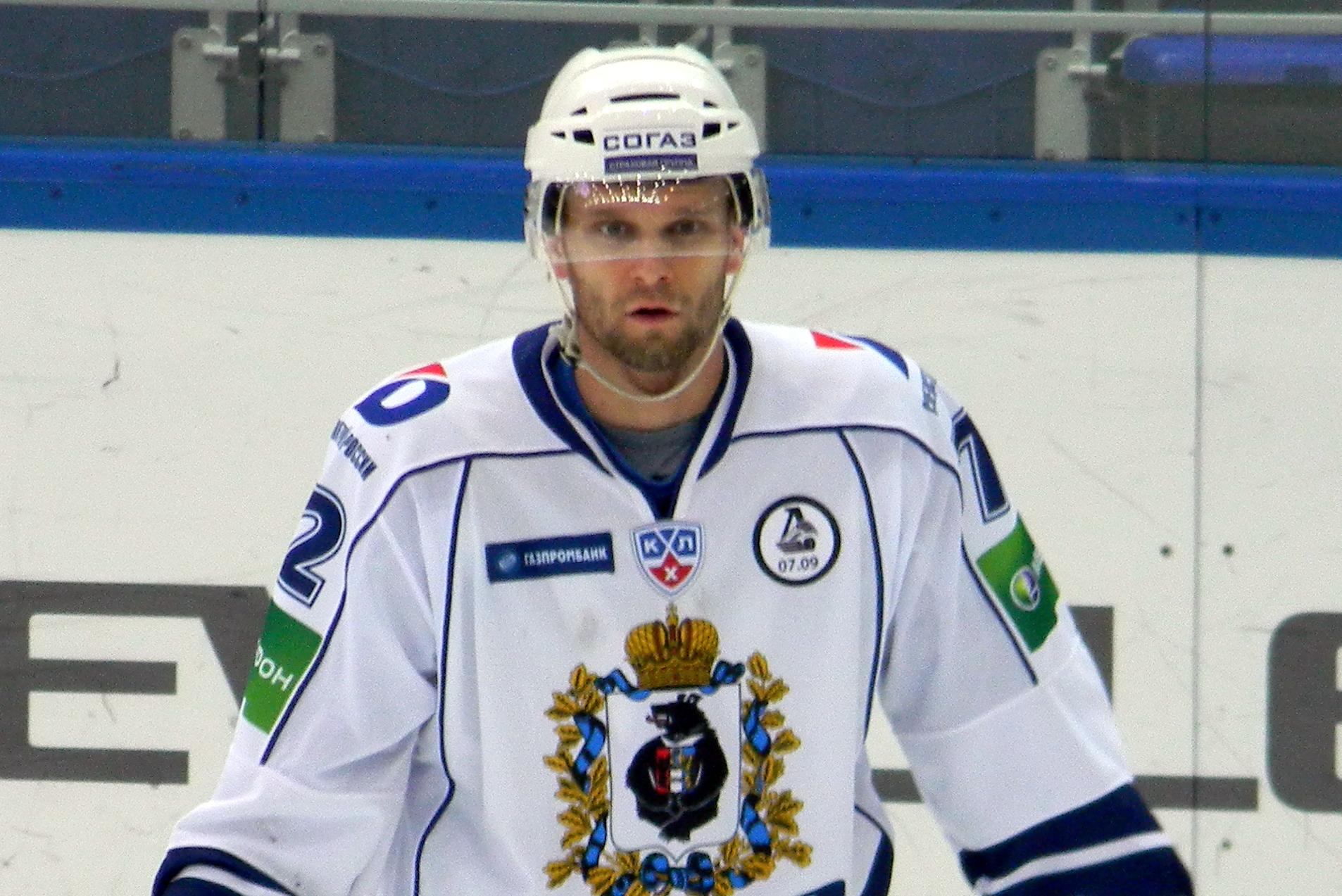
- Born: December 15, 1985 (age 40) Beroun, Czechoslovakia
- Height: 5 ft 11 in (180 cm)
- Weight: 174 lb (79 kg; 12 st 6 lb)
- Position: Centre
- Shoots: Right
- Czech team Former teams: HC Oceláři Třinec; HC Sparta Praha; HC Znojemští Orli; HC Olomouc; Amur Khabarovsk; Traktor Chelyabinsk
- National team: Czech Republic
- NHL draft: Undrafted
- Playing career: 2005–present

Martin Růžička (15 December 1985) is a Czech professional ice hockey player. Růžička is currently playing for HC Oceláři Třinec. Růžička has played professionally for HC Sparta Praha, HC Znojemští Orli, HC Olomouc, HC Oceláři Třinec and Amur Khabarovsk. Růžička participated at the 2010 IIHF World Championship as a member of the Czech Republic men's national ice hockey team.

== Playing career ==
Ruzicka was born in Beroun, and played his youth hockey with HC Berounsti Medvedi. Ruzicka began his junior hockey career with the HC Sparta Praha Under 18 squad in 2000–01. In 2001, he moved to HC Kladno, first for the under-18 squad, then moved up to the under-20 squad, playing two seasons for Kladno. Kladno won the junior title in 2003. Růžička then moved to North America to play major junior hockey for the Everett Silvertips in 2003–04. Růžička scored only 4 goals and 12 assists for Everett and was released after the season to re-enter the 2004 CHL European Import Draft. Růžička played for the Lethbridge Hurricanes in 2004–05, scoring 5 goals and 5 assists in 57 games.

Ruzicka's goal was to play in the NHL but he was not drafted by the National Hockey League (NHL) and he returned to the Czech Republic in 2005. From 2005 until 2011, Ruzicka played for several teams in Czech leagues. He had his best season in the Czech Extraliga league with Trinec in 2010–11, scoring 24 goals and 26 assists for 50 points in 51 games. He broke the Extraliga playoff scoring record, scoring 30 points (15 goals, 15 assists) in 15 games. The previous record of 26 points in 13 games was set by Zigmund Palffy in 1992. The season led to the attention of Amur Khabarovsk of the KHL, which has signed him for the 2011–12 season.

== International play ==
Ruzicka played in the 2005 World Junior Championships for the Czech Republic. He has also played in the 2010 World Championship for the Czech Republic. Ruzicka has also played in various 'friendly' games for the Czech Republic.

== Awards ==
- Eurohockey Player of the Month, March 2011
- Eurohockey Player of the Month, October 2012

== Career statistics ==
=== Regular season and playoffs ===
			Regular season					Playoffs
Season	Team	League	GP	G	A	Pts	PIM	GP	G	A	Pts	PIM
2000–01	HC Sparta Praha	CZE U18	2	0	0	0	0	—	—	—	—	—
2001–02	HC Vagnerplast Kladno	CZE U18	36	4	14	19	22	—	—	—	—	—
2002–03	HC Vagnerplast Kladno	CZE U20	48	16	8	24	12	11	1	2	3	4
2003–04	Everett Silvertips	WHL	68	4	12	16	10	21	1	3	4	4
2004–05	Lethbridge Hurricanes	WHL	57	5	5	10	33	3	0	0	0	0
2005–06	HC Sparta Praha	CZE U20	7	5	4	9	16	—	—	—	—	—
2005–06	HC Sparta Praha	ELH	29	0	1	1	8	9	0	1	1	0
2005–06	HC Berounští Medvědi	CZE.2	13	0	2	2	4	—	—	—	—	—
2006–07	HC Znojemští Orli	ELH	51	9	7	16	50	10	1	1	2	2
2007–08	HC Znojemští Orli	ELH	42	10	8	18	20	3	0	0	0	4
2007–08	HC Olomouc	CZE.2	1	0	0	0	0	—	—	—	—	—
2008–09	HC Znojemští Orli	ELH	48	10	5	15	22	—	—	—	—	—
2008–09	HC Olomouc	CZE.2	3	4	3	7	0	—	—	—	—	—
2009–10	HC Oceláři Třinec	ELH	51	23	24	47	34	5	2	2	4	2
2010–11	HC Oceláři Třinec	ELH	51	24	26	50	40	18	17	16	33	8
2011–12	Amur Khabarovsk	KHL	33	10	5	15	14	4	1	0	1	2
2012–13	HC Oceláři Třinec	ELH	52	40	43	83	18	12	6	3	9	2
2013–14	HC Oceláři Třinec	ELH	52	26	29	55	20	11	7	4	11	12
2014–15	Traktor Chelyabinsk	KHL	58	13	10	23	32	6	1	0	1	2
2013–14	Chelmet Chelyabinsk	VHL	1	0	0	0	0	—	—	—	—	—
2015–16	Traktor Chelyabinsk	KHL	52	5	5	10	18	—	—	—	—	—
2016–17	HC Oceláři Třinec	ELH	33	9	13	22	8	6	0	3	3	2
2017–18	HC Oceláři Třinec	ELH	49	29	25	54	42	5	1	1	2	6
2018–19	HC Oceláři Třinec	ELH	42	19	25	44	18	17	7	11	18	12
2019–20	HC Oceláři Třinec	ELH	18	7	10	17	2	—	—	—	—	—
2020–21	HC Oceláři Třinec	ELH	52	19	44	63	34	16	8	7	15	2
2021–22	HC Oceláři Třinec	ELH	52	21	27	48	12	13	2	7	9	2
2022–23	HC Oceláři Třinec	ELH	52	23	29	52	18	22	9	8	17	4
ELH totals			674	269	316	585	346	147	60	64	124	58
KHL totals			143	28	20	48	64	10	2	0	2	4

=== International ===
Year	Team	Event	GP	G	A	Pts	PIM
2010	Czech Republic	WC	8	0	0	0	0
2014	Czech Republic	WC	3	0	0	0	0
2018	Czech Republic	OG	6	1	1	2	2
Senior totals			17	1	1	2	2
