= Tomáš Pitule =

Czech ice hockey player

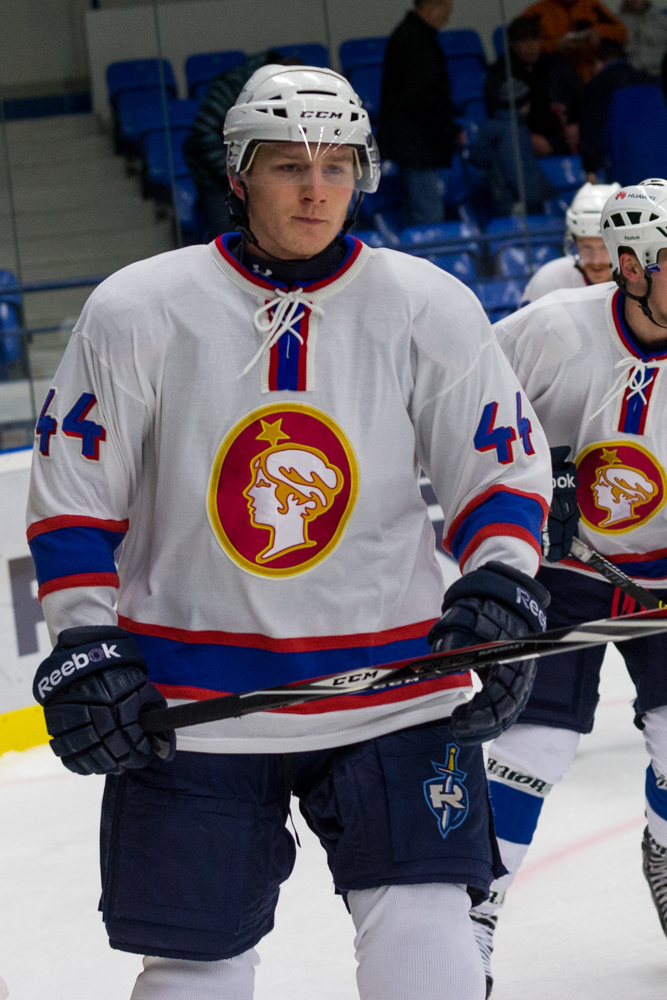
- Born: November 10, 1989 (age 35); Trutnov, Czechoslovakia
- Height: 6 ft 2 in (188 cm)
- Weight: 183 lb (83 kg; 13 st 1 lb)
- Position: Forward
- Shoots: Left
- EIHL team Former teams: Sheffield Steelers; HC Škoda Plzeň; HC Dukla Jihlava; BK Mladá Boleslav; Motor České Budějovice; Brûleurs de Loups; HC Nové Zámky; HC Shakhtyor Soligorsk; HC Neman Grodno; VHK Vsetín; Piráti Chomutov; Rytíři Kladno
- Playing career: 2009–present

Tomáš Pitule (born November 10, 1989) is a Czech professional ice hockey player currently with UK Elite Ice Hockey League (EIHL) side Sheffield Steelers.

Pitule has played most of his career in his native Czech Republic, with spells at HC Shakhtyor Soligorsk and HC Neman Grodno of the Belarusian Extraleague, in France with Brûleurs de Loups, and in Slovakia with HC Nové Zámky. He played with HC Plzeň in the Czech Extraliga during the 2010–11 Czech Extraliga season.
