= Michal Vondrka =

Czech ice hockey player

- Born: May 17, 1982 (age 44) České Budějovice, Czechoslovakia
- Height: 6 ft 0 in (183 cm)
- Weight: 176 lb (80 kg; 12 st 8 lb)
- Position: Right wing
- Shot: Left
- Played for: HC Slavia Praha; HC Energie Karlovy Vary; Oulun Kärpät; HC Slovan Bratislava; HC Sparta Praha; Piráti Chomutov; BK Mladá Boleslav; HC Dynamo Pardubice; Motor České Budějovice
- National team: Czech Republic
- NHL draft: 155th overall, 2001; Buffalo Sabres
- Playing career: 2000–2023
Medal record
World Championships
Bronze medal – third place	2012 Finland	Team

Michal Vondrka (born May 17, 1982) is a Czech former professional ice hockey player. He was selected by the Buffalo Sabres in the 5th round (155th overall) of the 2001 NHL entry draft.

Vondrka played previously for BK Mladá Boleslav, HC Slavia Praha, HC České Budějovice, IHC Písek, and HC Karlovy Vary.

== Career statistics ==
=== Regular season and playoffs ===
			Regular season					Playoffs
Season	Team	League	GP	G	A	Pts	PIM	GP	G	A	Pts	PIM
1998–99	HC České Budějovice	CZE U18
1999–2000	HC České Budějovice	CZE U20	20	6	3	9	14	—	—	—	—	—
2000–01	HC České Budějovice	CZE U20	31	9	14	23	37	6	0	0	0	0
2000–01	HC České Budějovice	ELH	8	1	0	1	2	—	—	—	—	—
2000–01	SHC Vajgar Jindřichův Hradec	CZE.3	—	—	—	—	—	1	0	1	1	0
2001–02	HC České Budějovice	CZE U20	12	2	6	8	6	2	1	3	4	2
2001–02	HC České Budějovice	ELH	33	1	1	2	2	—	—	—	—	—
2002–03	HC České Budějovice	CZE U20	7	4	1	5	4	—	—	—	—	—
2002–03	HC České Budějovice	ELH	27	1	3	4	4	3	0	0	0	0
2002–03	IHC Písek	CZE.2	18	3	2	5	39	3	1	0	1	0
2003–04	HC České Budějovice	ELH	8	1	0	1	0	—	—	—	—	—
2003–04	HC Slavia Praha	ELH	37	6	7	13	8	19	2	1	3	4
2004–05	HC Slavia Praha	ELH	25	5	1	6	12	5	0	0	0	2
2004–05	HC VČE Hradec Králové, a.s.	CZE.2	9	0	1	1	4	—	—	—	—	—
2005–06	HC Slavia Praha	ELH	52	6	1	7	24	14	1	1	2	0
2006–07	HC Slavia Praha	ELH	38	4	5	9	45	6	2	2	4	16
2006–07	HC Energie Karlovy Vary	ELH	11	0	0	0	31	—	—	—	—	—
2007–08	HC Slavia Praha	ELH	52	9	8	17	20	19	2	4	6	6
2008–09	HC Slavia Praha	ELH	50	9	13	22	40	18	6	7	13	12
2009–10	HC Slavia Praha	ELH	52	9	26	35	36	16	6	7	13	4
2010–11	HC Slavia Praha	ELH	52	14	21	35	24	19	4	11	15	12
2011–12	Kärpät	SM-l	21	3	3	6	14	—	—	—	—	—
2011–12	HC Slavia Praha	ELH	30	14	17	31	22	—	—	—	—	—
2012–13	HC Slovan Bratislava	KHL	46	9	11	20	18	4	1	1	2	0
2013–14	HC Slovan Bratislava	KHL	48	12	12	24	18	—	—	—	—	—
2014–15	HC Slovan Bratislava	KHL	45	7	12	19	28	—	—	—	—	—
2014–15	HC Slavia Praha	ELH	5	0	2	2	4	10	1	1	2	4
2015–16	Piráti Chomutov	ELH	39	11	13	24	14	8	1	1	2	10
2016–17	Piráti Chomutov	ELH	51	23	23	46	30	17	10	4	14	4
2017–18	Piráti Chomutov	ELH	52	18	25	43	20	—	—	—	—	—
2018–19	BK Mladá Boleslav	ELH	52	17	24	41	22	8	3	2	5	0
2019–20	BK Mladá Boleslav	ELH	32	8	8	16	18	—	—	—	—	—
2019–20	HC Dynamo Pardubice	ELH	14	5	7	12	2	—	—	—	—	—
2021–22	HC České Budějovice	ELH	47	15	9	24	16	10	2	3	5	4
2022–23	HC České Budějovice	ELH	18	4	4	8	4	—	—	—	—	—
ELH totals			785	181	218	399	400	172	40	44	84	78
KHL totals			139	28	35	63	64	4	1	1	2	0

=== International ===
Year	Team	Event	GP	G	A	Pts	PIM
2002	Czech Republic	WJC	7	1	1	2	8
2012	Czech Republic	WC	9	0	1	1	0
2014	Czech Republic	WC	6	0	0	0	0
2015	Czech Republic	WC	5	2	0	2	0
2018	Czech Republic	OG	2	0	0	0	0
Senior totals			22	2	1	3	0
