= Roman Chlouba =

Czech professional ice hockey player

- Born: February 11, 1991 (age 34); Chomutov, Czechoslovakia
- Height: 6 ft 0 in (183 cm)
- Weight: 163 lb (74 kg; 11 st 9 lb)
- Position: Forward
- Shoots: Right
- Czech 1. Liga team Former teams: LHK Jestřábi Prostějov; Piráti Chomutov
- NHL draft: Undrafted
- Playing career: 2009–present

Roman Chlouba (born February 11, 1991) is a Czech professional ice hockey player. He currently plays with LHK Jestřábi Prostějov of the Czech 1. Liga.

Chlouba made his Czech Extraliga debut playing with Piráti Chomutov debut during the 2012–13 Czech Extraliga season.
