= Lukáš Chalupa =

Czech ice hockey player

- Born: December 28, 1993 (age 31); Radonice, Czech Republic
- Height: 6 ft 2 in (188 cm)
- Weight: 182 lb (83 kg; 13 st 0 lb)
- Position: Defense
- Shoots: Left
- Chance Liga team Former teams: SK Horácká Slavia Třebíč; HC Slavia Praha; HC Plzeň; Piráti Chomutov
- Playing career: 2010–present

Lukáš Chalupa (born December 28, 1993) is a Czech professional ice hockey player. He is currently playing for SK Horácká Slavia Třebíč of the Chance Liga.

Chalupa has previously played in the Czech Extraliga for HC Slavia Praha, HC Plzeň and Piráti Chomutov.
