= 2000–01 Czech 1. Liga season =

The 2000–01 Czech 1.liga season was the eighth season of the Czech 1.liga, the second level of ice hockey in the Czech Republic. 14 teams participated in the league, and KHL Chomutov won the championship.

== Regular season ==
	Club	GP	W	T	L	Goals	Pts
1.	KLH Chomutov	40	24	5	11	132:96	53
2.	HC Liberec	40	24	5	11	125:76	53
3.	HC Dukla Jihlava	40	22	9	9	115:73	53
4.	HC Rosice	40	19	10	11	116:98	48
5.	HC Prostějov	40	19	5	16	119:119	43
6.	SK Horácká Slavia Třebíč	40	16	9	15	100:111	41
7.	HC Berounští Medvědi	40	16	9	15	119:107	41
8.	IHC Písek	40	16	9	15	112:114	41
9.	SK Kadaň	40	16	8	16	112:119	40
10.	HC Slezan Opava	40	17	6	17	100:108	40
11.	HC Šumperk	40	11	7	22	117:138	29
12.	HC Slovan Ústí nad Labem	40	10	8	22	94:125	28
13.	HC Ytong Brno	40	8	9	23	91:129	25
14.	HC Kometa Brno	40	7	11	22	95:134	25

== Playoffs ==
=== Quarterfinals ===
- KLH Chomutov – IHC Písek 3:0 (5:1, 4:0, 2:0)
- HC Liberec – HC Beroun 3:1 (3:2 P, 3:0, 3:4, 5:2)
- HC Dukla Jihlava – SK Horácká Slavia Třebíč 3:0 (4:2, 5:0, 3:2)
- HC Rosice – HC Prostějov 3:1 (4:1, 4:3, 3:5, 4:1)

=== Semifinals ===
- KLH Chomutov – HC Rosice 3:1 (1:2 SN, 8:0, 2:1, 4:1)
- HC Liberec – HC Dukla Jihlava 3:2 (2:4, 3:0, 2:0, 1:2 SN, 4:2)

=== Final ===
- KLH Chomutov – HC Liberec 3:0 (5:4 P, 5:2, 2:1 P)

== Qualification ==
	Club	GP	W	T	L	GF	GA	Pts
1.	HC Slezan Opava	50	20	6	24	135	152	46
2.	SK Kadaň	50	19	8	23	139	165	46
3.	HC Šumperk	50	17	10	23	154	159	44
4.	HC Kometa Brno	50	13	12	25	132	160	38
5.	HC Slovan Ústí nad Labem	50	15	8	27	127	163	38
6.	HC Ytong Brno	50	12	11	27	122	152	35

== Relegation ==
	Club	GP	W	T	L	GF	GA	Pts
1.	HC Ytong Brno	8	4	3	1	33	21	11
2.	HC Slovan Ústí nad Labem	8	4	2	2	23	14	10
3.	BK Mladá Boleslav	8	3	4	1	24	20	10
4.	HC Baník Most	7	2	2	3	11	17	6
5.	HC Nový Jičín	7	0	1	6	12	31	1
