= Michal Poletín =

Czech ice hockey player

- Born: 9 June 1991 (age 35) Prague, Czechoslovakia
- Height: 6 ft 2 in (188 cm)
- Weight: 220 lb (100 kg; 15 st 10 lb)
- Position: Forward
- Shoots: Left
- Czech Extraliga team Former teams: HC Dukla Jihlava; HC Slavia Praha; HC Plzeň; Piráti Chomutov; PSG Berani Zlín; HC Vítkovice Ridera
- Playing career: 2010–present

Michal Poletín (born 9 June 1991 in Prague) is a Czech professional ice hockey player playing for the club HC Dukla Jihlava .

He has played in the Czech Extraliga with HC Slavia Praha, HC Plzeň, Piráti Chomutov, PSG Berani Zlín and HC Vítkovice Ridera.
