= Jakub Trefný =

Czech ice hockey player

- Born: March 12, 1981 (age 45) Louny, Czechoslavakia
- Height: 5 ft 10 in (178 cm)
- Weight: 203 lb (92 kg; 14 st 7 lb)
- Position: Defence
- Shoots: Left
- Czech 1.liga team: SK Kadaň
- Playing career: 2001–present

Jakub Trefný (born March 12, 1981) is a Czech professional ice hockey defenceman. He played with HC Karlovy Vary in the Czech Extraliga during the 2010–11 Czech Extraliga season.
