= Jakub Chrpa =

Czech professional ice hockey player

- Born: February 13, 1994 (age 31); Czech Republic
- Height: 5 ft 9 in (175 cm)
- Weight: 178 lb (81 kg; 12 st 10 lb)
- Position: Forward
- Shoots: Left
- Czech team: Piráti Chomutov
- Playing career: 2013–present

Jakub Chrpa (born February 13, 1994) is a Czech professional ice hockey player. He is currently playing for Piráti Chomutov of the Czech Extraliga.

Chrpa made his Czech Extraliga debut playing with Piráti Chomutov during the 2015-16 Czech Extraliga season.
