= Vladimír Růžička (ice hockey, born 1989) =

Czech ice hockey player

Vladimir Ruzicka
- Born: February 17, 1989 (age 36) Most, Czechoslovakia
- Height: 6 ft 1 in (185 cm)
- Weight: 196 lb (89 kg; 14 st 0 lb)
- Position: Forward
- Shot: Left
- Played for: HC Slavia Praha; Piráti Chomutov; HC Sparta Praha; Piráti Chomutov; Mountfield HK; Dornbirn Bulldogs; HC Letci Letnany
- NHL draft: 103rd overall, 2007; Phoenix Coyotes
- Playing career: 2005–2025

Vladimír Růžička (born February 17, 1989) is a Czech former professional ice hockey player.

He made his Czech Extraliga debut playing with HC Slavia Praha during the 2005–06 Czech Extraliga season.
