= 2006–07 Czech 1. Liga season =

The 2006–07 Czech 1.liga season was the 14th season of the Czech 1.liga, the second level of ice hockey in the Czech Republic. 14 teams participated in the league, and HC Slovan Usti nad Labem won the championship.

== Regular season ==
	Club	GP	W	OTW	OTL	L	Goals	Pts
1.	HC Hradec Králové	52	34	6	1	11	204:112	115
2.	HC Slovan Ústí nad Labem	52	33	5	4	10	182:105	113
3.	BK Mladá Boleslav	52	31	5	4	12	184:127	107
4.	KLH Chomutov	52	28	8	3	13	204:141	103
5.	HC Kometa Brno	52	26	9	5	12	184:124	101
6.	SK Horácká Slavia Třebíč	52	23	3	5	21	130:134	80
7.	HC Dukla Jihlava	52	23	2	5	22	172:185	78
8.	HC Sareza Ostrava	52	20	4	5	22	165:164	75
9.	HC Prostějov	52	19	2	8	23	155:178	69
10.	HC Havířov	52	15	4	4	29	136:170	57
11.	HC Havlíčkův Brod	52	14	4	5	29	134:189	55
12.	HC Berounští Medvědi	52	12	4	6	30	112:177	50
13.	SK Kadaň	52	14	2	3	33	113:195	49
14.	HC Olomouc	52	11	2	3	36	114:188	40

== Playoffs ==
=== Quarterfinals ===
- HC Hradec Králové – HC Sareza Ostrava 4:2 (3:1, 5:2, 2:4, 2:7, 3:1, 6:4)
- HC Slovan Ústí nad Labem – HC Dukla Jihlava 4:0 (3:2 P, 5:2, 5:2, 3:0)
- BK Mladá Boleslav – SK Horácká Slavia Třebíč 4:1 (7:0, 4:2, 1:2 P, 4:1, 6:0)
- KLH Chomutov – HC Kometa Brno 4:0 (4:2, 3:1, 2:1, 4:2)

=== Semifinals ===
- HC Hradec Králové – KLH Chomutov 1:3 (7:3, 1:2 SN, 2:3, 1:5)
- HC Slovan Ústí nad Labem – BK Mladá Boleslav 3:0 (4:3, 4:1, 6:4)

=== Final ===
- HC Slovan Ústí nad Labem – KLH Chomutov 3:2 (4:0, 2:3, 2:3 P, 3:2 P, 5:1)
