= Jan Havel (ice hockey, born 1996) =

Czech ice hockey player

- Born: July 8, 1996 (age 29) Czech Republic
- Height: 6 ft 1 in (185 cm)
- Weight: 172 lb (78 kg; 12 st 4 lb)
- Position: Forward
- Shoots: Left
- Czech team: HC Sparta Praha
- Playing career: 2015–present

Jan Havel (born July 8, 1996) is a Czech professional ice hockey player. He is currently playing for HC Sparta Praha of the Czech Extraliga.

Havel made his Czech Extraliga debut playing with HC Sparta Praha during the 2015-16 Czech Extraliga season.
