= 2018–19 Czech Extraliga season =

2018–19 Czech Extraliga
- League: Czech Extraliga
- Sport: Ice hockey
- Teams: 14
- TV partner: Česká televize

Regular Season
- Presidential Cup: HC Bílí Tygři Liberec
- Top scorer: Milan Gulaš (HC Plzeň)

Playoffs

Finals
- Champions: HC Oceláři Třinec
- Runners-up: HC Bílí Tygři Liberec

Czech Extraliga seasons
- ← 2017–18 2019–20 →

The 2018–19 Czech Extraliga season was the 26th season of the Czech Extraliga since its creation after the breakup of Czechoslovakia and the Czechoslovak First Ice Hockey League in 1993. HC Oceláři Třinec won their second Extraliga title, and first since 2011, after overcoming HC Bílí Tygři Liberec by 4 games to 2 in the finals.

== Regular season ==
Pl.	Team	GP	W	OTW	OTL	L	Goals	Pts
1.	HC Bílí Tygři Liberec	52	30	3	5	14	170:125	101
2.	HC Oceláři Třinec	52	30	3	3	16	153:117	99
3.	HC Plzeň	52	26	7	6	13	178:116	98
4.	HK Hradec Králové	52	25	6	6	15	147:125	93
5.	HC Kometa Brno	52	23	7	5	17	149:133	88
6.	HC Olomouc	52	24	3	7	18	127:139	85
7.	HC Vítkovice	52	24	4	3	21	142:131	83
8.	BK Mladá Boleslav	52	25	3	1	23	128:118	82
9.	PSG Berani Zlín	52	22	3	5	22	143:144	77
10.	HC Sparta Praha	52	20	7	2	23	140:140	76
11.	HC Litvínov	52	20	5	1	26	128:147	71
12.	HC Energie Karlovy Vary	52	13	4	6	29	125:155	53
13.	Piráti Chomutov	52	13	3	5	31	116:174	50
14.	HC Dynamo Pardubice	52	9	2	5	36	102:187	36

=== Scoring leaders ===
List shows the ten best skaters based on the number of points during the regular season. If two or more skaters are tied (i.e. same number of points, goals and played games), all of the tied skaters are shown.

GP = Games played; G = Goals; A = Assists; Pts = Points; +/– = Plus/minus; PIM = Penalty minutes

Player	Team	GP	G	A	Pts	+/–	PIM
(Czech Republic) Milan Gulaš	HC Škoda Plzeň	51	30	32	62	+10	46
(Czech Republic) Marek Kvapil	Bílí Tygři Liberec	47	25	32	57	+10	12
(Czech Republic) Petr Holík	HC Kometa Brno	52	17	38	55	+18	16
(United States) Peter Mueller	HC Kometa Brno	43	24	21	45	+9	42
(Czech Republic) Martin Růžička	HC Oceláři Třinec	42	19	25	44	+15	18
(Czech Republic) Martin Zaťovič	HC Kometa Brno	52	22	19	41	+15	30
(Czech Republic) Michal Vondrka	BK Mladá Boleslav	52	17	24	41	+8	22
(Czech Republic) Ondřej Roman	HC Vítkovice Ridera	50	14	26	40	-1	20
(Slovakia) Libor Hudáček	Bílí Tygři Liberec	52	17	22	39	+11	18
(Czech Republic) Vladimír Růžička	Piráti Chomutov	50	16	23	39	-11	40

=== Leading goaltenders ===
These are the leaders in GAA among goaltenders who played at least 40% of the team's minutes. The table is sorted by GAA, and the criteria for inclusion are bolded.

GP = Games played; TOI = Time on ice (minutes); GA = Goals against; SO = Shutouts; Sv% = Save percentage; GAA = Goals against average

Player	Team	GP	TOI	GA	SO	Sv%	GAA
(Czech Republic) Dominik Frodl	HC Plzeň	43	2,569	81	4	92.8	1.89
(Slovenia) Gašper Krošelj	BK Mladá Boleslav	34	1,877	64	5	92.1	2.05
(United States) Brandon Maxwell	HK Hradec Kralove	29	1,716	59	1	91.8	2.06
(Czech Republic) Patrik Bartošák	HC Vítkovice Ridera	47	2,742	99	1	93.5	2.17
(Czech Republic) Šimon Hrubec	HC Oceláři Třinec	46	2,638	96	5	92.2	2.18
(Czech Republic) Libor Kašík	PSG Berani Zlín	19	1,113	41	0	92.0	2.21
(Czech Republic) Pavel Kantor	BK Mladá Boleslav	14	947	35	1	90.9	2.25
(Czech Republic) Roman Will	Bílí Tygři Liberec	51	2,941	111	5	91.6	2.26
(Czech Republic) Jan Lukáš	HC Olomouc	22	1,255	49	1	92.3	2.34
(Czech Republic) Karel Vejmelka	HC Kometa Brno	31	1,762	70	1	91.5	2.38

== Playoffs ==
Ten teams qualify for the playoffs. Teams 1–6 have a bye to the quarterfinals, while teams 7–10 meet each other in a preliminary playoff round.

=== Playoff bracket ===
In the first round the 7th-ranked team will meet the 10th-ranked team and the 8th-ranked team will meet the 9th-ranked team for a place in the second round. In the second round, the top-ranked team will meet the lowest-ranked winner of the first round, the 2nd-ranked team will face the other winner of the first round, the 3rd-ranked team will face the 6th-ranked team, and the 4th-ranked team will face the 5th-ranked team. In the third round, the highest remaining seed is matched against the lowest remaining seed. In each round the higher-seeded team is awarded home advantage. In the first round the meetings are played as best-of-five series and the rest is best-of-seven series that follows an alternating home team format: the higher-seeded team will play at home for games 1 and 2 (plus 5 and 7 if necessary), and the lower-seeded team will be at home for game 3 and 4 (plus 6 if necessary).

First round
8	BK Mlada Boleslav	3
9	PSG Berani Zlín	2
7	HC Vitkovice	3
10	HC Sparta Praha	1

Quarterfinals
1	Bili Tygri Liberec	4
8	BK Mlada Boleslav	1
4	HK Hradec Kralove	0
5	HC Kometa Brno	4
2	HC Ocelari Trinec	4
7	HC Vitkovice	0
3	HC Plzen	4
6	HC Olomouc	3

Semifinals
1	Bili Tygri Liberec	4
5	HC Kometa Brno	2
(Pairings are re-seeded after the first and second round)
2	HC Ocelari Trinec	4
3	HC Plzen	3

Finals
1	Bili Tygri Liberec	2
2	HC Ocelari Trinec	4

Play-off final: Bili Tygri Liberec - HC Ocelari Trinec 2:4 (1:2, 3:1, 4:1, 1:2 OT, 2:3 OT, 4:2). HC Ocelari Trinec has won its second Czech league title.

== Relegation ==
Place	Team	GP	W	OTW	OTL	L	GF	GA	Pts
1	HC Dynamo Pardubice	12	9	0	0	3	26	20	27
2	Rytiri Kladno	12	7	0	1	4	30	30	22
3	Pirati Chomutov	12	5	1	1	5	31	37	18
4	Motor Ceske Budejovice	12	1	1	0	10	26	40	5
