= 2017–18 Czech Extraliga season =

2017–18 Czech Extraliga
- League: Czech Extraliga
- Sport: Ice hockey
- Teams: 14
- TV partner: Czech Television

Regular Season
- Presidential Cup: HC Plzeň
- Top scorer: Milan Gulaš (HC Plzeň)

Playoffs

Finals
- Champions: HC Kometa Brno
- Runners-up: HC Oceláři Třinec

Czech Extraliga seasons
- ← 2016–17 2018–19 →

The 2017–18 Czech Extraliga season was the 25th season of the Czech Extraliga since its creation after the breakup of Czechoslovakia and the Czechoslovak First Ice Hockey League in 1993. Defending champions HC Kometa Brno won their second consecutive title and 13th national title in all, after beating HC Oceláři Třinec by 4 games to 1.

== Regular season ==
Pl.	Team	GP	W	OTW	OTL	L	Goals	Pts
1.	HC Plzeň^{CHL}	52	28	7	9	8	172:123	107
2.	Mountfield HK^{CHL}	52	26	7	7	12	146:101	99
3.	HC Oceláři Třinec	52	24	6	8	14	143:122	92
4.	HC Vítkovice Ridera	52	26	4	6	16	157:119	92
5.	HC Kometa Brno	52	23	6	9	14	148:121	90
6.	HC Dynamo Pardubice	52	20	5	6	21	148:121	76
7.	HC Bílí Tygři Liberec	52	18	9	4	21	132:138	76
8.	HC Olomouc	52	16	10	7	19	129:136	75
9.	PSG Berani Zlín	52	18	8	4	22	121:140	74
10.	HC Sparta Praha	52	18	5	7	22	140:150	71
11.	Piráti Chomutov	52	13	10	9	20	132:155	68
12.	BK Mladá Boleslav	52	15	6	8	23	118:139	65
13.	HC Dukla Jihlava	52	12	7	7	26	106:139	57
14.	HC Litvínov	52	10	7	6	29	118:168	50

- ^{CHL} Qualification to Champions Hockey League

=== Scoring leaders ===
List shows the ten best skaters based on the number of points during the regular season. If two or more skaters are tied (i.e. same number of points, goals and played games), all of the tied skaters are shown.
GP = Games played; G = Goals; A = Assists; Pts = Points; +/– = Plus/minus; PIM = Penalty minutes

Player	Team	GP	G	A	Pts	+/–	PIM
(Czech Republic) Milan Gulaš	HC Škoda Plzeň	48	23	38	61	+20	50
(Czech Republic) Tomáš Mertl	HC Škoda Plzeň	50	30	27	57	+18	59
(Czech Republic) Martin Růžička	HC Oceláři Třinec	49	29	25	54	+4	42
(Latvia) Roberts Bukarts	PSG Berani Zlín	50	21	28	49	+15	56
(Czech Republic) Martin Erat	HC Kometa Brno	49	12	34	46	0	20
(Czech Republic) Michal Vondrka	Piráti Chomutov	52	18	25	43	-6	20
(Czech Republic) Jaroslav Bednář	Mountfield HK	46	15	27	42	+12	20
(Slovakia) Martin Bakoš	Bílí Tygři Liberec	52	14	26	40	0	34
(Czech Republic) Viktor Hübl	HC Litvínov	45	15	24	39	+6	34
(Czech Republic) Rudolf Červený	Mountfield HK	48	21	17	38	+19	54

=== Leading goaltenders ===
These were the leaders in GAA among goaltenders who played at least 40% of the team's minutes. The table is sorted by GAA, and the criteria for inclusion are bolded. GP = Games played; TOI = Time on ice (minutes); GA = Goals against; SO = Shutouts; Sv% = Save percentage; GAA = Goals against average

Player	Team	GP	TOI	GA	SO	Sv%	GAA
(Slovakia) Patrik Rybár	Mountfield HK	36	2078	60	7	93.19	1.73
(Czech Republic) Šimon Hrubec	HC Oceláři Třinec	44	2546	86	4	92.82	2.03
(Czech Republic) Miroslav Svoboda	HC Škoda Plzeň	47	2770	97	5	92.57	2.10
(Czech Republic) Patrik Bartošák	HC Vítkovice Ridera	47	2781	98	5	93.34	2.11
(Slovakia) Marek Čiliak	HC Kometa Brno	37	2249	85	6	91.60	2.27
(Czech Republic) Roman Will	Bílí Tygři Liberec	45	2536	99	6	91.29	2.34
(Finland) Sami Aittokallio	HC Sparta Praha	28	1580	62	1	91.83	2.35
(Czech Republic) Ondřej Kacetl	HC Dynamo Pardubice	41	2398	98	3	91.81	2.45
(United States) Brandon Maxwell	BK Mladá Boleslav	38	2126	87	3	91.71	2.46
(Slovakia) Branislav Konrád	HC Olomouc	48	2841	117	7	90.53	2.47

== Playoffs ==
Ten teams qualified for the playoffs, with 1–6 walked over to the quarterfinals while teams 7–10 meeting each other in a preliminary playoff round.

=== Playoff bracket ===
In the first round, the seventh-ranked team met the tenth-ranked team, while eighth-ranked team met the ninth-ranked team for a place in the second round. In the second round, the top-ranked team met the lowest-ranked winner of the first round, the second-ranked team faced the other winner of the first round, the third-ranked team faced the sixth-ranked team, and the fourth-ranked team faced the fifth-ranked team. In the third round, the highest remaining seed faced the lowest remaining seed. In each round, the higher-seeded team is awarded home advantage. The first round meetings were played as best-of-five series and the rest was best-of-seven series that follows an alternating home team format: the higher-seeded team played at home for the first and second matches, whilst lower-seeded one played at home for the third and fourth matches.

First round
7	HC Bílí Tygři Liberec	3
10	HC Sparta Praha	0
8	HC Olomouc	3
9	PSG Berani Zlín	1

Quarterfinals
1	HC Plzeň	4
8	HC Olomouc	1
2	Mountfield HK	4
7	HC Bílí Tygři Liberec	3
3	HC Oceláři Třinec	4
6	HC Dynamo Pardubice	3
4	HC Vítkovice Ridera	0
5	HC Kometa Brno	4

Semifinals
1	HC Plzeň	1
5	HC Kometa Brno	4
(Pairings are re-seeded after the first and second round)
2	Mountfield HK	2
3	HC Oceláři Třinec	4

Finals
5	HC Kometa Brno	4
3	HC Oceláři Třinec	1

Play-off final: HC Oceláři Třinec - HC Kometa Brno 1:4 (5:1, 2:3, 2:3, 2:5, 1:4). HC Kometa Brno won its second Czech league title (and 13th overall title).

== Relegation ==
Place	Team	GP	W	OTW	OTL	L	GF	GA	Pts
1	HC Litvínov	12	5	2	1	4	27	27	20
2	HC Karlovy Vary	12	4	3	2	3	30	24	20
3	HC Dukla Jihlava	12	5	1	2	4	29	25	19
4	HC Kladno	12	4	0	1	7	17	27	13
