= 2013–14 Czech Extraliga season =

2013–14 Czech Extraliga
- League: Czech Extraliga
- Sport: Ice hockey
- Teams: 14
- TV partner: Czech Television

Regular season
- Presidential Cup: HC Sparta Praha
- Top scorer: Petr Ton (Sparta Praha)

Playoffs

Finals
- Champions: PSG Zlín (2nd title)
- Runners-up: HC Kometa Brno

Czech Extraliga seasons
- ← 2012–13 2014–15 →

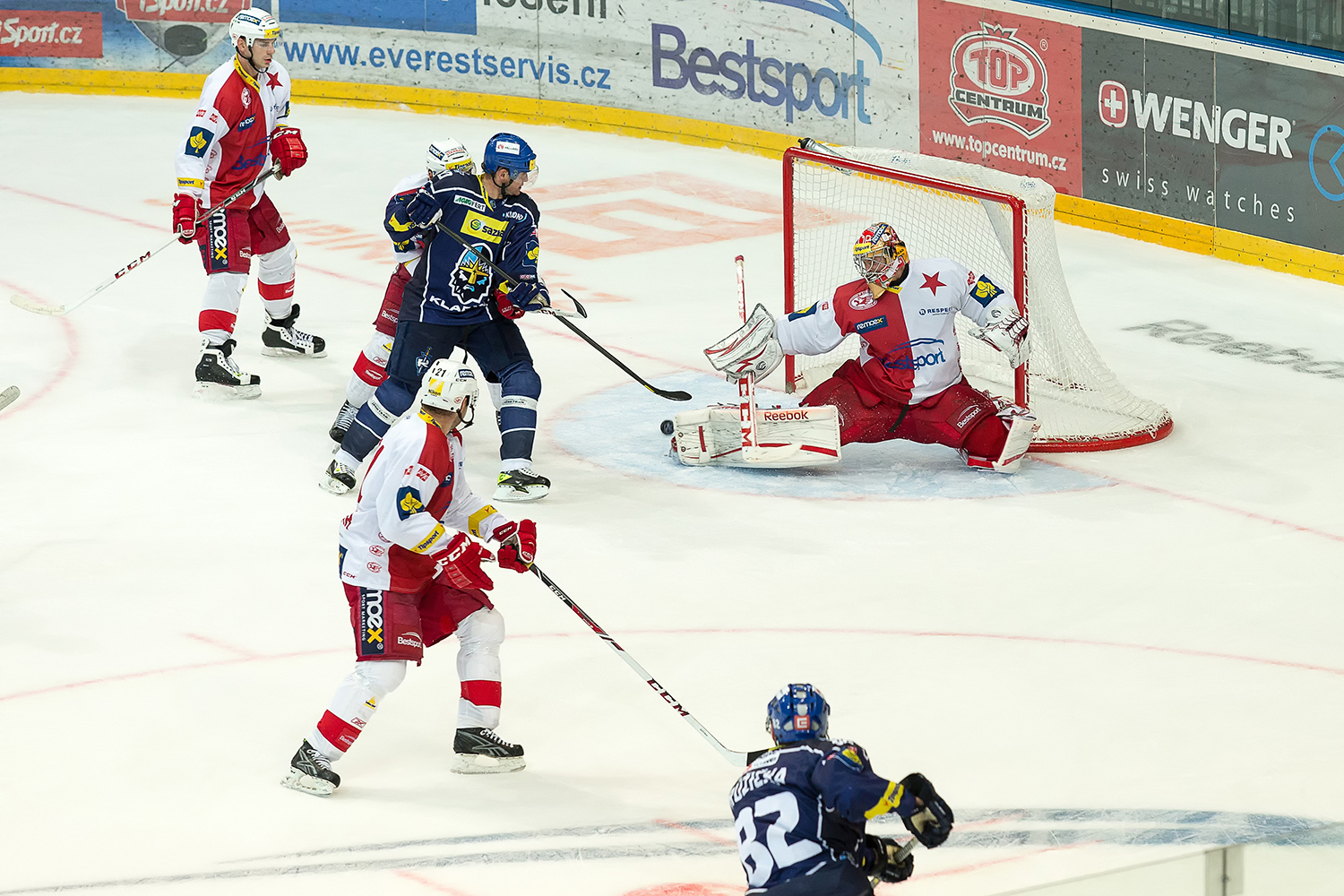

The 2013–14 Czech Extraliga season was the 21st season of the Czech Extraliga since its creation after the breakup of Czechoslovakia and the Czechoslovak First Ice Hockey League in 1993. PSG Zlín won their second title, defeating HC Kometa Brno in five matches in the finals.

== Regular season ==
Pl.	Team	GP	W	OTW	OTL	L	Goals	Pts
1.	HC Sparta Praha	52	34	1	6	11	208:100	110
2.	HC Oceláři Třinec	52	29	3	2	18	163:123	95
3.	HC Škoda Plzeň	52	27	5	3	17	133:118	94
4.	PSG Zlín	52	24	6	6	16	136:119	90
5.	Mountfield HK	52	21	10	7	14	125:110	90
6.	HC Kometa Brno	52	25	5	2	20	126:124	87
7.	HC ČSOB Pojišťovna Pardubice	52	22	4	9	17	150:139	83
8.	HC Vítkovice Steel	52	22	6	4	20	162:146	82
9.	HC Bílí Tygři Liberec	52	19	9	3	21	147:155	78
10.	HC Slavia Praha	52	16	8	8	20	134:136	71
11.	HC Verva Litvínov	52	16	8	7	21	106:122	71
12.	HC Energie Karlovy Vary	52	19	2	5	26	114:147	66
13.	Rytíři Kladno	52	10	7	3	32	98:154	47
14.	Piráti Chomutov	52	6	0	9	37	91:191	27

== Playoffs ==
=== Play-in Round ===
- HC Vítkovice Steel - HC Bílí Tygři Liberec 3:0 (2:0, 3:1, 6:2)
- HC ČSOB Pojišťovna Pardubice - HC Slavia Praha 3:2 (3:0, 3:4, 4:2, 0:1, 6:4)

Quarterfinals
1	HC Sparta Praha	4
8	HC Vítkovice Steel	1
3	HC Škoda Plzeň	2
6	HC Kometa Brno	4
2	HC Oceláři Třinec	4
7	HC ČSOB Pojišťovna Pardubice	1
4	PSG Zlín	4
5	Mountfield HK	2

Semifinals
1	HC Sparta Praha	3
6	HC Kometa Brno	4
2	HC Oceláři Třinec	2
4	PSG Zlín	4

Final
4	PSG Zlín	4
6	HC Kometa Brno	1

Play-off final: PSG Zlín - HC Kometa Brno 4:1 (3:0, 3:0, 4:1, 1:3, 5:3). PSG Zlín won its second league title after ten years.

== Relegation ==
Place	Team	GP	W	OTW	OTL	L	GF	GA	Pts
1	HC Verva Litvínov	58	22	8	7	21	128	131	89
2	HC Energie Karlovy Vary	58	20	4	5	29	132	170	73
3	Rytíři Kladno	58	13	7	4	34	119	170	57
4	Piráti Chomutov	58	6	0	10	42	102	215	28
