= Piráti Chomutov =

- City: Chomutov, Czech Republic
- League: 1st Czech Republic Hockey League
- Founded: 1945
- Home arena: Rocknet aréna (capacity: 5,250)
- Colours: Black, white, red
- General manager: Daniel Badinka
- Head coach: Martin Pešout

Piráti Chomutov (English: Chomutov Pirates) is a Czech ice hockey team from Chomutov, Czech Republic. Established as ČSK Chomutov in 1945, the team has played in Chomutov through numerous team name changes and promotions/relegations in the Czechoslovak and Czech leagues. They play in the second level 1st Czech Republic Hockey League. Their home arena is the Rocknet aréna located in Chomutov, Czech Republic.

== History ==
The club was established in 1945 as ČSK Chomutov.

In the 1950–51 season, playing as Sokol Hutě, the team was promoted to the Czechoslovak First Ice Hockey League, where they played until the 1963–64 season.

In 1967, as VTŽ Chomutov, the team was promoted to the highest league again but was relegated the very next year. In 1984 the club was demoted to the third level of hockey in Czechoslovak hockey, the Second National Hockey League.

In 1997, as KLH Chomutov, the club bought the license in the First National Hockey League (FNHL) from HC Slovan Ústečtí Lvi.

After winning the league in the 2011–12 FNHL season, Piráti Chomutov returned to the top-level league Czech Extraliga. During the play-outs in the 2013–14 season Piráti Chomutov lost and returned to the First National Hockey League. Season 2014–15 in FNHL was one of the most successful in history. Pirati Chomutov became a winner and after play off returned to the top-level league (season 2015–16).

== 1956 airplane disaster ==
On 24 November 1956, while the team was operating under the name TJ Baník Chomutov ZJF, some members of the team were involved in a fatal airplane accident. A Czechoslovak Airlines flight, on an Ilyushin Il-12B aircraft, crashed near Eglisau, Switzerland. Three players, two top club officials and a reporter were among others on board the scheduled flight from Zurich to Prague, which crashed in fields after an engine failure. All on board perished.

== Roster ==
Updated April 25, 2018

No.	Nat	Player	Pos	S/G	Age	Acquired	Birthplace
93	(Czech Republic)	Tadeáš Dvořák	G	R	30	2017	Tábor, Czech Republic
29	(Czech Republic)	Štěpán Lukeš	G	L	29		Chomutov, Czech Republic
34	(Czech Republic)	Dominik Pavlát	G	L	26	2013	Tábor, Czech Republic
4	(Czech Republic)	Ondřej Buchtela	D	R	26	2013	Ústí nad Labem, Czech Republic
25	(Czech Republic)	Lukáš Chalupa	D	L	32	2016	Radonice, Czech Republic
67	(Czech Republic)	Stanislav Dietz	D	L	35	2017	Písek, Czech Republic
22	(Czech Republic)	Tomáš Dvořák	D	L	30	2017	Havlíčkův Brod, Czech Republic
55	(Czech Republic)	Patrik Kadeřávek	D	L	29	2017	Prague, Czech Republic
3	(Czech Republic)	Ronald Knot	D	R	31	2017	Prague, Czech Republic
96	(Czech Republic)	Jaroslav Mrázek	D	L	40	2011	Milevsko, Czech Republic
59	(Czech Republic)	Šimon Szathmáry	D	R	30	2011	Havlíčkův Brod, Czech Republic
24	(Czech Republic)	Jakub Trefný	D	L	44	2018	Louny, Czech Republic
86	(Czech Republic)	Jan Havel	RW	L	29	2017	
44	(Czech Republic)	Darek Hejcman	C	R	31		Chomutov, Czech Republic
77	(Czech Republic)	Nicolas Hlava	RW	R	31		Chomutov, Czech Republic
71	(Czech Republic)	Ivan Huml (A)	LW	L	44	2016	Kladno, Czech Republic
15	(Czech Republic)	Roman Chlouba	LW	R	34	2016	Chomutov, Czech Republic
27	(Czech Republic)	Jakub Chrpa	RW	L	31		Chomutov, Czech Republic
11	(Czech Republic)	Petr Koblasa	RW	R	32	2016	Soběslav, Czech Republic
13	(Czech Republic)	Jakub Lauko	C	L	25		Prague, Czech Republic
33	(Czech Republic)	Michal Poletín	RW	L	34	2016	Prague, Czech Republic
62	(Czech Republic)	Vladimír Růžička	C	L	36	2014	Most, Czech Republic
88	(Czech Republic)	Jakub Sklenář	LW	L	37	2015	Znojmo, Czech Republic
76	(Czech Republic)	Jiří Smejkal	C	L	29	2017	České Budějovice, Czech Republic
66	(Czech Republic)	Martin Šťovíček	RW	L	30	2013	Prague, Czech Republic
18	(Czech Republic)	Vojtěch Tomeček	RW	R	31	2017	Karlovy Vary, Czech Republic
14	(Czech Republic)	Marek Tomica (A)	C	L	45	2015	Třebíč, Czech Republic
72	(Czech Republic)	Lukáš Vantuch	C	L	38	2018	Jihlava, Czech Republic
82	(Czech Republic)	Michal Vondrka (C)	LW	L	43	2015	České Budějovice, Czech Republic

== Club names ==
- 1945 - ČSK Chomutov
- 1949 - ZJS spojené ocelárny
- 1951 - Sokol Hutě
- 1953 - TJ Baník Chomutov ZJF
- 1958 - Baník VTŽ Chomutov
- 1960 - VTŽ Chomutov
- 1991 - Klub ledního hokeje VT VTJ Chomutov
- 1996 - KLH Chomutov
- 2011 - Piráti Chomutov

== See also ==
- List of accidents involving sports teams
