= 2012–13 Czech Extraliga season =

2012–13 Czech Extraliga
- League: Czech Extraliga
- Sport: Ice hockey
- Duration: September 2012 – February 2013
- Teams: 14
- TV partner: Česká televize

Regular season
- Presidential Cup: PSG Zlín
- Top scorer: Martin Růžička (HC Oceláři Třinec)

Playoffs

Finals
- Champions: HC Škoda Plzeň (1st title)
- Runners-up: PSG Zlín

Czech Extraliga seasons
- ← 2011–12 2013–14 →

The 2012–13 Czech Extraliga season is the 20th season of the Czech Extraliga since its creation after the breakup of Czechoslovakia and the Czechoslovak First Ice Hockey League in 1993. HC Škoda Plzeň won the championship for the first time in their history, defeating PSG Zlín in the seventh game of the finals.

== Regular season ==
=== Standings ===
Place	Team	GP	W	OTW	OTL	L	GF	GA	Pts
1	PSG Zlín	52	25	7	5	15	158	137	94
2	HC Slavia Praha	52	23	11	3	15	138	111	94
3	HC Škoda Plzeň	52	21	9	8	14	160	131	89
4	HC Oceláři Třinec	52	24	5	4	19	196	159	86
5	HC Sparta Praha	52	24	5	4	19	171	149	86
6	HC VERVA Litvínov	52	20	9	5	18	162	148	83
7	Rytíři Kladno	52	23	1	6	22	142	146	77
8	HC Mountfield	52	19	8	3	22	135	149	76
9	HC Vítkovice Steel	52	22	2	5	23	141	151	75
10	HC ČSOB Pojišťovna Pardubice	52	21	2	6	23	155	161	73
11	HC Kometa Brno	52	17	6	9	20	149	158	72
12	HC Energie Karlovy Vary	52	19	2	6	25	133	148	67
13	HC Bílí Tygři Liberec	52	15	3	12	22	137	178	63
14	Piráti Chomutov	52	11	10	4	27	127	178	57

=== Statistics ===
==== Scoring leaders ====
Updated as of the end of the regular season.
GP = Games played; G = Goals; A = Assists; Pts = Points; +/– = Plus/Minus; PIM = Penalty Minutes

Player	Team	GP	G	A	Pts	+/–	PIM
(Czech Republic) Martin Růžička	HC Oceláři Třinec	52	40	43	83	–10	18
(Czech Republic) Viktor Hübl	HC VERVA Litvínov	52	22	36	58	+14	62
(Czech Republic) Jaromír Jágr	Rytíři Kladno	34	24	33	57	+22	28
(Czech Republic) Lukáš Pech	HC Energie Karlovy Vary	51	22	35	57	+8	50
(Czech Republic) Milan Gulaš	HC Škoda Plzeň	44	27	28	55	+27	28
(Czech Republic) František Lukeš	HC VERVA Litvínov	50	26	28	54	+13	36
(Czech Republic) Martin Straka	HC Škoda Plzeň	47	15	39	54	+26	18
(Czech Republic) Petr Nedvěd	HC Bílí Tygři Liberec	48	20	33	53	–14	151
(Czech Republic) Tomáš Vlasák	HC Škoda Plzeň	45	17	35	52	+17	12
(Czech Republic) Jan Kovář	HC Škoda Plzeň	52	17	34	51	+10	66

== Playoffs ==
=== Bracket ===
The playoff bracket is not a fixed bracket. Like the intraconference bracket in the NHL, the matchups are adjusted in each successive round in order to place the top-ranked team against the bottom-ranked team.

First round March 1–March 7
8	České Budějovice	2
9	Vítkovice	3
7	Kladno	3
10	Pardubice	2

Quarterfinals; March 8–20
1	Zlín	4
9	Vítkovice	2
4	Třinec	4
5	Sparta Praha	3
3	Plzeň	4
6	Litvínov	3
2	Slavia Praha	4
7	Kladno	1

Semifinals; March 24–
1	Zlín	4
4	Třinec	2
2	Slavia Praha	2
3	Plzeň	4

Finals –
1	Zlín	3
3	Plzeň	4

== Relegation ==
Place	Team	GP	W	OTW	OTL	L	GF	GA	Pts
1	HC Kometa Brno	58	18	8	10	22	164	175	80
2	HC Energie Karlovy Vary	58	22	2	7	27	151	167	77
3	HC Bílí Tygři Liberec	58	18	4	12	24	154	189	74
4	Piráti Chomutov	58	12	11	6	29	145	199	64
