= 2016–17 Czech Extraliga season =

2016–17 Czech Extraliga
- League: Czech Extraliga
- Sport: Ice hockey
- Teams: 14
- TV partner: Česká televize

Regular Season
- Presidential Cup: HC Bílí Tygři Liberec
- Top scorer: Dominik Kubalík (HC Plzen)

Playoffs

Finals
- Champions: HC Kometa Brno
- Runners-up: HC Bílí Tygři Liberec

Czech Extraliga seasons
- ← 2015–16 2017–18 →

The 2016–17 Czech Extraliga season was the 24th season of the Czech Extraliga since its creation after the breakup of Czechoslovakia and the Czechoslovak First Ice Hockey League in 1993. HC Kometa Brno won their first Extraliga title, and 12th national title in all, after defeating HC Bílí Tygři Liberec by four games to zero in the finals.

== Regular season ==
As of March 3, 2017

| Pl. | Team | GP | W | OTW | OTL | L | Goals | Pts |
|---|---|---|---|---|---|---|---|---|
| 1. | HC Bílí Tygři Liberec^{CHL} | 52 | 31 | 2 | 6 | 13 | 136:102 | 103 |
| 2. | HC Oceláři Třinec^{CHL} | 52 | 24 | 9 | 8 | 11 | 158:125 | 98 |
| 3. | HC Sparta Praha | 52 | 26 | 5 | 6 | 15 | 164:117 | 94 |
| 4. | Mountfield HK | 52 | 24 | 5 | 7 | 16 | 159:125 | 89 |
| 5. | HC Verva Litvínov | 52 | 20 | 13 | 2 | 17 | 128:126 | 88 |
| 6. | HC Kometa Brno | 52 | 22 | 4 | 10 | 16 | 158:139 | 84 |
| 7. | Piráti Chomutov | 52 | 18 | 10 | 6 | 18 | 149:154 | 80 |
| 8. | HC Vítkovice Steel | 52 | 19 | 8 | 3 | 22 | 119:126 | 76 |
| 9. | HC Škoda Plzeň | 52 | 19 | 5 | 6 | 22 | 135:138 | 73 |
| 10. | BK Mladá Boleslav | 52 | 21 | 2 | 6 | 23 | 132:148 | 73 |
| 11. | PSG Zlín | 52 | 17 | 8 | 4 | 23 | 126:155 | 71 |
| 12. | HC Olomouc | 52 | 17 | 7 | 5 | 23 | 123:127 | 70 |
| 13. | HC Energie Karlovy Vary | 52 | 12 | 1 | 11 | 28 | 107:160 | 49 |
| 14. | HC Dynamo Pardubice | 52 | 9 | 6 | 5 | 32 | 128:180 | 44 |

- ^{CHL} Qualification to Champions Hockey League

== Playoffs ==
=== Play-in Round ===
- HC Vítkovice Steel - HC Škoda Plzeň 2:3 (3:1, 3:2 OT, 3:5, 2:5, 1:2 OT)
- Piráti Chomutov - BK Mladá Boleslav 3:2 (1:7, 1:6, 5:1, 2:1, 6:1)

Quarterfinals
1 | HC Bílí Tygři Liberec | 4
9 | HC Škoda Plzeň | 2
2 | HC Oceláři Třinec | 2
7 | Piráti Chomutov | 4
4 | Mountfield HK | 4
5 | HC Verva Litvínov | 1
3 | HC Sparta Praha | 0
6 | HC Kometa Brno | 4

Semifinals
1 | HC Bílí Tygři Liberec | 4
7 | Piráti Chomutov | 2
4 | Mountfield HK | 2
6 | HC Kometa Brno | 4

Final
1 | HC Bílí Tygři Liberec | 0
6 | HC Kometa Brno | 4

Play-off final: HC Bílí Tygři Liberec - HC Kometa Brno 0:4 (3:4, 3:4 OT, 0:3, 2:5). HC Kometa Brno won its first Czech league title (and 12th overall title; first since 1966).

== Relegation ==
| Place | Team | GP | W | OTW | OTL | L | GF | GA | Pts |
|---|---|---|---|---|---|---|---|---|---|
| 1 | HC Olomouc | 58 | 21 | 7 | 5 | 25 | 144 | 145 | 82 |
| 2 | PSG Zlín | 58 | 18 | 8 | 5 | 27 | 142 | 176 | 75 |
| 3 | HC Energie Karlovy Vary | 58 | 17 | 1 | 11 | 29 | 138 | 177 | 64 |
| 4 | HC Dynamo Pardubice | 58 | 10 | 7 | 5 | 36 | 145 | 209 | 49 |
