= BK Mladá Boleslav =

- City: Mladá Boleslav, Czech Republic
- League: Czech Extraliga
- Founded: 1908
- Home arena: Ško-Energo Aréna (capacity: 4,200)
- Colours: Green, white, black
- Owners: (Czech Republic) Jan Plachý; City of Mladá Boleslav
- Head coach: (Czech Republic) Petr Haken
- Captain: (Czech Republic) Adam Jánošík
- Website: bkboleslav.cz

BK Mladá Boleslav (Czech: Bruslařský klub Mladá Boleslav) is a professional ice hockey team which plays in the Czech Extraliga, the country's highest level. They were promoted into the league on 18 April 2014 after a two-year absence. They play their home games at Ško-Energo Aréna.

== History ==
=== 2000-12: Extraliga ===
In 2000 and 2001, Mladá Boleslav won the 2nd national hockey league, and in 2008 they won the 1st national hockey league. In that year, they joined the Extraliga, after winning a promotion-relegation play-off against HC Slovan Ústečtí Lvi. In each of its first three seasons in the Czech Extraliga, Mladá Boleslav had to win a best-of-seven promotion-relegation play-off to stay in the top league, beating Slovan Ústečtí Lvi 4–3 in the last of them.

During the 2010–2011 season, the team was docked 22 points for using players not correctly registered to the club, an affair which also involved HC Plzeň and HC Kladno. An appeal against the penalty was turned down. The club was later fined 3 million Czech crowns in a separate matter in which its administration was ruled to have deliberately withheld information concerning club debt.

In September 2011, locally born Radim Vrbata of the NHL's Vancouver Canucks, bought a 33% share in the club, which he held until 2015.

In April 2012 the club finished in last place and lost the subsequent promotion-relegation play-off against Piráti Chomutov in seven games. The club was therefore relegated from the Extraliga to the 1st League.

=== 2012-14: 1st League and promotion battles ===
Coach František Výborný, father of the team's captain David, was hired as coach for the 2012–2013 season. The club finished the league phase of that season in first place with 117 points from 52 games.

For the 2012/13 a new system for promotion and relegation between the Extraliga and the 1st League was implemented, involving the two lowest-placed teams from the Extraliga and the two highest teams from the 1st League. Each team would meet each other team twice at home and twice away, each playing 12 games in total. Points would be awarded in the same way as in the regular season (3 points for a win in regulation, 2 points for a win in overtime, 1 point for an overtime loss, and 0 points for a regulation loss). Since both semi-finalists would enter the promotion/relegation play-off, the 1st League championship final was omitted. However, BK Mladá Boleslav, as the winning semi-finalist with the better regular season record, secured the championship trophy ahead of the other semi-finalist HC Olomouc. The other teams in the play-offs were Piráti Chomutov and Bílí Tygři Liberec.

BK Mladá Boleslav began the play-off with two away losses, 1–2 in Chomutov and 0–3 in Olomouc. However, they won the next 3 matches, all at home, defeating Liberec 7–3, Chomutov 4–3 after a shoot-out, and finally Olomouc 4–2. Their poor form then returned, losing to Chomutov 1–2 and Liberec 1–4 before their only away victory of the play-offs, 3–1 in Olomouc. The team then won their next 3 home games, over Liberec (7–0), Chomutov (5–0), and Olomouc (2–1). At this point Mladá Boleslav, Chomutov and Liberec were equal on 20 points each with one game remaining. Mladá Boleslav lost 0–2 to Liberec in the final game. After this game BK Mladá Boleslav's management submitted an official protest to the league's governing body over a number of controversial umpiring decisions during the match, but the league commission rejected all three appeals, and Piráti Chomutov and Bílí Tigři Liberec therefore remained in the Extraliga for the 2013/14 season, and BK Mladá Boleslav and HC Olomouc remained in the První Liga.

Coach František Výborný confirmed that he would remain with the club for a second season. Mladá Bolelav began the 2013/14 season with a home game against Draci Šumperk on September 11.

The club finished the 2013/2014 regular season in first place with 126 points. In the first round of the play-offs they defeated local rivals Benátky nad Jizerou 4–2 in a best-of-seven series ending on March 3, 2014. They defeated their semi-final opponent HC Horácká Slavia Třebíč by 4–0, qualifying for the play-offs for a second year in a row. The two Extraliga participants were Rytíři Kladno and Piráti Chomutov, along with HC Olomouc, also for a second season in succession. On 18 April 2014, despite losing to Olomouc 5–4 in overtime, Mladá Boleslav won their return to the Extraliga for the 2014/15 season after a two-year absence.

=== 2014-present: Back in the Extraliga ===
The 2014/2015 season saw the club reach the Extraliga play-offs for the first time. After finishing tenth in the league phase, they defeated Plzeň in four games in the best-of-five preliminary round before losing to eventual runners-up HC Oceláři Třinec in five games in the best-of-seven quarter-final. After this successful season for the team, coach František Výborný and assistant coach Marian Jelínek both signed new two-year contracts with the club.

In the 2015/16 season the team finished the regular season in sixth place, qualifying directly for the quarter-finals. Their opponent was HK Mountfield Hradec Králové. In the first game of the series, captain David Výborný suffered a career-ending knee injury. He has since become the sporting manager of the club. The team went on to win the series in 6 games, progressing to a semi-final against the regular season winner HC Bílí Tygří Liberec, who won in a series sweep.

== Players ==
=== Current roster ===
As of 20 February 2025.

No.	Nat	Player	Pos	S/G	Age	Acquired	Birthplace
17	(Czech Republic)	David Bernad	D	L	32	2016	Písek, Czech Republic
47	(Czech Republic)	Jan Buchtele	LW	L	36	2024	Hradec Králové, Czechoslovakia
73	(Czech Republic)	Petr Čajka	C	L	25	2024	Kadaň, Czech Republic
5	(Czech Republic)	Aleš Čech	D	L	22	2023	Prague, Czech Republic
21	(Czech Republic)	David Dvořáček	LW	L	34	2023	Brno, Czechoslovakia
12	(Czech Republic)	Tomáš Fořt (A)	C	L	34	2021	Plzeň, Czechoslovakia
38	(Czech Republic)	Dominik Furch	G	L	36	2024	Prague, Czechoslovakia
44	(Czech Republic)	Petr Gewiese	D	L	33	2024	Šumperk, Czech Republic
77	(Czech Republic)	Tomáš Havlín	D	L	30	2024	Jablonec nad Nisou, Czech Republic
30	(Czech Republic)	Vojtěch Hradec	C	L	20	2023	Mladá Boleslav, Czech Republic
3	(Slovakia)	Adam Jánošík (C)	D	L	33	2021	Spišská Nová Ves, Czechoslovakia
13	(Finland)	Julius Junttila	LW	L	35	2024	Oulu, Finland
31	(Czech Republic)	Dominik Lakatoš	RW	L	29	2024	Kolín, Czech Republic
10	(Finland)	Alex Lintuniemi	D	L	30	2024	Helsinki, Finland
–	(Czech Republic)	Tomáš Mazura	C	L	25	2024	Pardubice, Czech Republic
89	(United States)	Steve Moses	RW	R	37	2024	Leominster, Massachusetts, United States
45	(Czech Republic)	Filip Pavlík	D	R	34	2023	Třebíč, Czechoslovakia
24	(Czech Republic)	Filip Pyrochta (A)	D	L	30	2023	Třebíč, Czech Republic
18	(Finland)	Aleksi Rekonen	W	L	33	2024	Helsinki, Finland
33	(Czech Republic)	Jan Růžička	G	L	29	2023	Mladá Boleslav, Czech Republic
28	(Slovakia)	Pavol Skalický	C	R	30	2023	Gelnica, Slovakia
91	(Czech Republic)	Jan Stransky	RW	R	36	2019	Plzeň, Czechoslovakia
42	(Czech Republic)	Filip Suchý	LW	L	28	2023	Horní Lukavice, Czech Republic
49	(Czech Republic)	Jan Závora	C	R	24	2022	Mladá Boleslav, Czech Republic
