= 2010–11 Czech Extraliga season =

2010–11 Czech Extraliga
- League: Czech Extraliga
- Sport: Ice hockey
- Duration: September 2010 – February 2011
- Teams: 14
- TV partner: Czech Television

Regular season
- Presidential Cup: HC Oceláři Třinec
- Top scorer: Tomáš Vlasák (HC Plzeň 1929)

Playoffs

Finals
- Champions: HC Oceláři Třinec
- Runners-up: Vítkovice

Czech Extraliga seasons
- ← 2009–10 2011–12 →

The 2010–11 Czech Extraliga season was the 18th season of the Czech Extraliga since its creation after the breakup of Czechoslovakia and the Czechoslovak First Ice Hockey League in 1993. In the regular season, HC Oceláři Třinec finished atop the league. Oceláři Třinec won the championship and became the eighth team to win it, after defeating Vítkovice by 4 games to 1 in the finals.

== Standings ==
Place	Team	GP	W	OTW	OTL	L	GF	GA	Pts
1	HC Oceláři Třinec	52	26	5	8	13	178	136	96
2	HC Bílí Tygři Liberec	52	26	5	6	15	159	139	94
3	HC Vítkovice Steel	52	26	6	2	18	162	137	92
4	PSG Zlín	52	22	7	8	15	158	134	88
5	HC Eaton Pardubice	52	24	3	10	15	146	125	88
6	HC Mountfield České Budějovice	52	23	6	4	19	158	131	85
7	HC Slavia Prague	52	21	9	3	19	140	131	84
8	HC BENZINA Litvínov	52	23	2	4	23	133	162	77
9	HC Plzeň 1929^{*}	52	27	6	3	16	153	145	77
10	HC Energie Karlovy Vary	52	15	7	12	18	152	154	71
11	HC Kometa Brno	52	19	5	1	27	130	146	68
12	HC Sparta Prague	52	14	6	3	29	115	142	57
13	HC Vagnerplast Kladno	52	10	3	5	34	105	172	35
14	BK Mladá Boleslav	52	14	4	5	29	123	158	33

== Playoffs ==
Quarter-finals
HC Oceláři Třinec	4
HC BENZINA Litvínov	2
HC Bílí Tygři Liberec	3
HC Slavia Praha	4
PSG Zlín	0
HC Eaton Pardubice	4
HC Vítkovice Steel	4
HC České Budějovice	2

Semi-finals
HC Oceláři Třinec	4
HC Slavia Praha	3
HC Eaton Pardubice	1
HC Vítkovice Steel	4

Final
HC Oceláři Třinec	4
HC Vítkovice Steel	1

== Relegation ==
Place	Team	GP	W	OTW	OTL	L	GF	GA	Pts
1	HC Kometa Brno	64	26	5	1	32	163	180	89
2	HC Sparta Prague	64	17	7	3	37	139	177	69
3	HC Vagnerplast Kladno	64	18	3	6	37	152	200	59
4	BK Mladá Boleslav	64	19	4	5	36	152	194	48
