= 2015–16 Czech Extraliga season =

2015–16 Czech Extraliga
- League: Czech Extraliga
- Sport: Ice hockey
- Teams: 14
- TV partner: Česká televize

Regular season
- Presidential Cup: HC Bílí Tygři Liberec
- Season MVP: Marek Čiliak (HC Kometa Brno)
- Top scorer: Roman Červenka (Piráti Chomutov)

Playoffs
- Playoffs MVP: Radim Šimek (Liberec)
- Finals champions: HC Bílí Tygři Liberec
- Runners-up: HC Sparta Praha

Czech Extraliga seasons
- ← 2014–15 2016–17 →

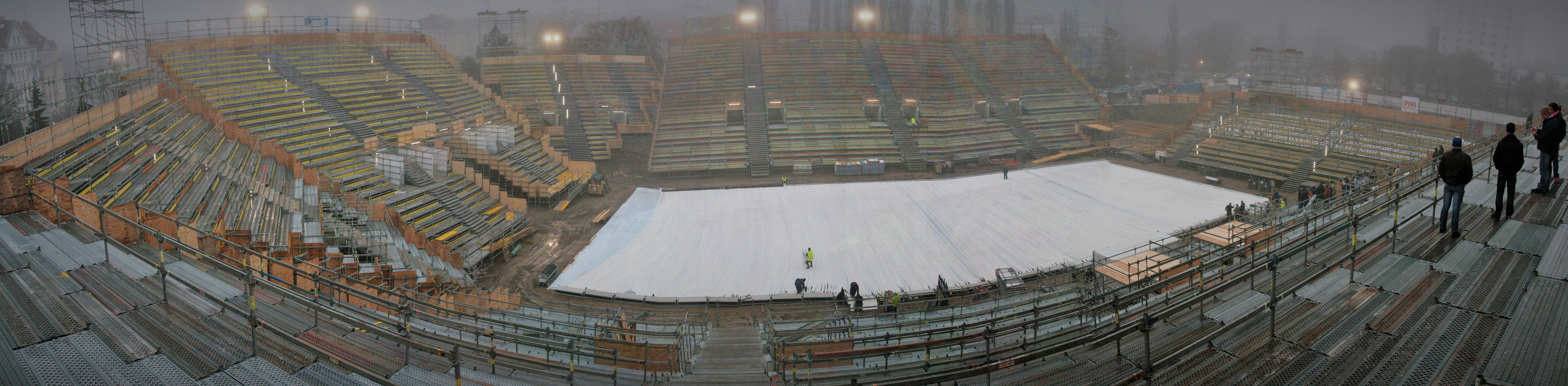

The 2015–16 Czech Extraliga season is the 23rd season of the Czech Extraliga since its creation after the breakup of Czechoslovakia and the Czechoslovak First Ice Hockey League in 1993. HC Bílí Tygři Liberec won the championship, their first ever title, after beating HC Sparta Praha in the finals by 4 games to 2.

== Regular season ==
As of 4 March 2016.

Pl.	Team	GP	W	OTW	OTL	L	Goals	Pts
1.	HC Bílí Tygři Liberec	52	33	8	3	8	181:112	118
2.	HC Sparta Praha	52	30	7	6	9	200:132	110
3.	Mountfield HK	52	24	4	8	16	143:135	88
4.	HC Škoda Plzeň	52	23	6	6	17	165:142	87
5.	HC Olomouc	52	22	5	9	16	117:115	85
6.	BK Mladá Boleslav	52	20	7	9	16	152:141	83
7.	PSG Zlín	52	21	6	6	19	129:128	81
8.	Piráti Chomutov	52	21	4	7	20	130:144	78
9.	HC Kometa Brno	52	19	4	4	25	132:149	69
10.	HC Oceláři Třinec	52	16	7	6	23	122:126	68
11.	HC Vítkovice Steel	52	17	6	3	26	143:149	66
12.	HC Dynamo Pardubice	52	16	2	5	29	113:156	57
13.	HC Verva Litvínov	52	10	10	5	17	110:138	55
14.	HC Energie Karlovy Vary	52	13	3	2	34	113:180	47

=== Scoring leaders ===
List shows the ten best skaters based on the number of points during the regular season. If two or more skaters are tied (i.e. same number of points, goals and played games), all of the tied skaters are shown.
GP = Games played; G = Goals; A = Assists; Pts = Points; +/– = Plus/minus; PIM = Penalty minutes

Player	Team	GP	G	A	Pts	+/–	PIM
Roman Červenka	Piráti Chomutov	49	23	38	61	+12	96
Daniel Přibyl	HC Sparta Praha	45	16	29	45	+14	16
Petr Vampola	HC Bílí Tygři Liberec	52	14	31	45	+10	64
Jaroslav Bednář	Mountfield HK	50	13	29	42	+2	44
Jan Buchtele	HC Sparta Praha	47	19	22	41	+15	28
Vojtěch Němec	HC Kometa Brno	50	16	25	41	-4	58
Branko Radivojevič	HC Bílí Tygři Liberec	51	15	26	41	+25	71
Petr Holík	PSG Zlín	52	11	30	41	-5	12
Dominik Kubalík	HC Škoda Plzeň	48	25	15	40	+1	20
Jaroslav Kracík	HC Škoda Plzeň	50	11	29	40	+7	40

=== Leading goaltenders ===
These are the leaders in GAA among goaltenders who played at least 40% of the team's minutes. The table is sorted by GAA, and the criteria for inclusion are bolded.

Note: GP = Games played; Mins = Minutes played; W = Wins; L = Losses; Goals Allowed; SO = Shutouts; SV% = Save Percentage; GAA = Goals against average

Player	Team	GP	Mins	W	L	GA	SO	SV%	GAA
Branislav Konrád	HC Olomouc	42	2522	24	18	77	6	0.929	**1.83**
Libor Kašík	PSG Zlín	44	2560	23	21	81	2	0.928	**1.90**
Matěj Machovský	HC Škoda Plzeň	48	2737	26	22	111	4	0.919	**2.43**
David Rittich	BK Mladá Boleslav	48	2849	26	22	120	5	0.917	**2.53**
Brandon Maxwell	HC Dynamo Pardubice	41	2333	15	26	101	3	0.915	**2.60**

== Playoffs ==
Quarterfinals
1	HC Bílí Tygři Liberec	4
8	Piráti Chomutov	0
3	Mountfield HK	2
6	BK Mladá Boleslav	4
2	HC Sparta Praha	4
7	PSG Zlín	1
4	HC Škoda Plzeň	4
5	HC Olomouc	1

Semifinals
1	HC Bílí Tygři Liberec	4
6	BK Mladá Boleslav	0
2	HC Sparta Praha	4
4	HC Škoda Plzeň	2

Final
1	HC Bílí Tygři Liberec	4
2	HC Sparta Praha	2

Play-off final: HC Bílí Tygři Liberec - HC Sparta Praha 4:2 (1:3, 4:2, 4:1, 1:4, 4:3, 2:1 OT). HC Bílí Tygři Liberec won its first ever league title.

== Play-in round ==
=== (8) Piráti Chomutov vs. (9) HC Kometa Brno ===
March 7	Piráti Chomutov	2 – 1	OT	HC Kometa Brno	Rocknet aréna
No scoring		First period		Petr Mrázek (1) - 9:54
No scoring		Second period		No scoring
9:22 - pp - Brett Skinner (1)		Third period		No scoring
2:13 - Brett Skinner (2)		First overtime period		No scoring
Robert Kristan (20 saves / 21 shots)		Goalie stats		Marek Čiliak (28 saves / 30 shots)

March 8	Piráti Chomutov	2 – 0	HC Kometa Brno	Rocknet aréna
14:12 - Roman Červenka (1)		First period	No scoring
17:51 - Peter Ölvecký (1)		Second period	No scoring
No scoring		Third period	No scoring
Robert Kristan (26 saves / 26 shots)		Goalie stats	Marek Čiliak (19 saves / 21 shots)

March 10	HC Kometa Brno	3 – 2	Piráti Chomutov	Winning Group Arena
No scoring		First period	No scoring
0:57 - Marek Račuk (1)		Second period	Leoš Čermák (1) - sh - ps - 7:08
3:26 - pp - Hynek Zohorna (1); 4:19 - pp - Rastislav Špirko (1)		Third period	David Kaše (1) - pp - 10:19
Marek Čiliak (26 saves / 28 shots)		Goalie stats	Robert Kristan (36 saves / 39 shots)

March 11	HC Kometa Brno	3 – 4	Piráti Chomutov	Winning Group Arena
7:32 - pp - Leoš Čermák (2); 18:59 - Vlastimil Dostálek (1)		First period	Jakub Chrpa (1) - 6:32; Roman Červenka (2) - pp - 16:57
No scoring		Second period	David Květoň (1) - 5:03
2:42 - Martin Dočekal (1)		Third period	Roman Červenka (3) - 15:36
Marek Čiliak (28 saves / 32 shots)		Goalie stats	Robert Kristan (34 saves / 37 shots); Jan Strmeň (1 save / 1 shot)

Chomutov won series 3 – 1

=== (7) PSG Zlín vs. (10) HC Oceláři Třinec ===
March 7	PSG Zlín	2 – 1	HC Oceláři Třinec	Trinity Bank Arena Luďka Čajky
14:42 - pp - Oldrich Kotvan (1)		First period	Jiří Polanský (1) - 4:38
16:12 - Roberts Bukarts (1)		Second period	No scoring
No scoring		Third period	No scoring
Libor Kašík (32 saves / 33 shots)		Goalie stats	Peter Hamerlík (17 saves / 19 shots)

March 8	PSG Zlín	3 – 4	SO	HC Oceláři Třinec	Trinity Bank Arena Luďka Čajky
5:41 - Roman Vlach (1)		First period		Vladimír Dravecký (1) - pp - 12:58
6:17 - Petr Holík (1)		Second period		Antonín Pechanec (1) - pp - 15:33
10:16 - Tomáš Čachotský (1)		Third period		Petr Kanko (1) - 3:39
Tomáš Čachotský; (miss) Roberts Bukarts; Petr Holík; (miss) Tomáš Čachotský		Shootout		Jiří Polanský (miss); Vladimír Svačina; Vladimír Dravecký; Vladimír Svačina
Libor Kašík (42 saves / 45 shots)		Goalie stats		Peter Hamerlík (41 saves / 44 shots)

March 10	HC Oceláři Třinec	2 – 3	OT	PSG Zlín	Werk Arena
No scoring		First period		Petr Holík (2) - pp - 8:55
12:28 - Radoslav Tybor (1); 18:15 - Antonín Pechanec (2)		Second period		No scoring
No scoring		Third period		Petr Holík (3) - 12:05
No scoring		First overtime period		Petr Holík (4) - 2:53
Peter Hamerlík (14 saves / 17 shots)		Goalie stats		Libor Kašík (29 saves / 31 shots); Luboš Horčička (6 saves / 6 shots)

March 11	HC Oceláři Třinec	4 – 3	PSG Zlín	Werk Arena
12:52 - pp - Tomáš Čachotský (2); 16:53 - Jiří Polanský (1)		First period	Oldrich Kotvan (2) - pp - 8:06
18:47 - Jiří Polanský (2)		Second period	Tomáš Fořt (1) - 1:37; Jan Maruna (1) - 17:34
12:52 - Denis Kindl (1)		Third period	No scoring
Peter Hamerlík (30 saves / 33 shots)		Goalie stats	Libor Kašík (24 saves / 28 shots)

March 13	PSG Zlín	3 – 2	OT	HC Oceláři Třinec	Trinity Bank Arena Luďka Čajky
No scoring		First period		David Nosek (1) - pp - 11:45
5:11 - Daniel Štumpf (1); 13:50 - Petr Holík (5)		Second period		Denis Kindl (2) - 4:41
0:50 - Ondřej Veselý (1)		Third period		No scoring
Libor Kašík (24 saves / 26 shots)		Goalie stats		Peter Hamerlík (18 saves / 21 shots)

Zlín won series 3 – 2

== Quarterfinals ==
=== (1) HC Bílí Tygři Liberec vs. (8) Piráti Chomutov ===
March 16	HC Bílí Tygři Liberec	4 – 1	Piráti Chomutov	Home Credit Arena
10:29 - Michal Bulíř (1)		First period	No scoring
No scoring		Second period	Michal Vondrka (1) - 15:23
6:27 - pp - Michal Birner (1); 12:33 - Michal Řepík (1); 17:02 - ps - Michal Řepík (2)		Third period	No scoring
Ján Lašák (15 saves / 16 shots)		Goalie stats	Robert Kristan (46 saves / 49 shots); Jan Strmeň (0 saves / 1 shot)

March 17	HC Bílí Tygři Liberec	4 – 1	Piráti Chomutov	Home Credit Arena
No scoring		First period	Brett Skinner (3) - pp - 19:33
2:35 - sh - Branko Radivojevič (1); 9:39 - pp - Martin Bakoš (1)		Second period	No scoring
3:47 - Petr Jelínek (1); 18:47 - Martin Ševc (1)		Third period	No scoring
Ján Lašák (27 saves / 28 shots)		Goalie stats	Robert Kristan (27 saves / 31 shots)

March 20	Piráti Chomutov	1 – 3	HC Bílí Tygři Liberec	Rocknet aréna
4:05 - sh - Vladimír Růžička (1)		First period	No scoring
No scoring		Second period	Tomáš Mojžíš (1) - pp - 14:39
No scoring		Third period	Michal Řepík (3) - 6:32; Petr Vampola (1) - en - 19:55
Robert Kristan (26 saves / 28 shots)		Goalie stats	Ján Lašák (21 saves / 22 shots)

March 21	Piráti Chomutov	2 – 7	HC Bílí Tygři Liberec	Rocknet aréna
No scoring		First period	Jan Stránský (1) - 4:55; Martin Bakoš (2) - 13:24; Michal Bulíř (2) - 18:31
14:57 - Jan Rutta (1)		Second period	Michal Bulíř (3) - pp - 11:08; Jan Stránský (2) - 17:03
1:20 - pp - Adam Jánošík (1)		Third period	Dominik Lakatoš (1) - 16:09; Jan Ordoš (1) - 19:05
Robert Kristan (8 saves / 11 shots); Jan Strmeň (20 saves / 24 shots)		Goalie stats	Ján Lašák (28 saves / 30 shots)

Liberec won series 4 – 0

==== (3) Mountfield HK vs. (6) BK Mladá Boleslav ====
March 14	Mountfield HK	5 – 2	BK Mladá Boleslav	ČPP Arena
0:49 - Rudolf Červený (1); 11:01 - Roman Kukumberg (1)		First period	No scoring
No scoring		Second period	Pavel Musil (1) - 5:00
7:29 - Jaroslav Kudrna (1); 8:00 - Rastislav Dej (1); 11:24 - Jiří Šimánek (1)		Third period	Tomáš Klimenta (1) - 14:01
Ondřej Kacetl (32 saves / 34 shots)		Goalie stats	David Rittich (39 saves / 44 shots)

March 15	Mountfield HK	3 – 4	OT	BK Mladá Boleslav	ČPP Arena
No scoring		First period		Jakub Klepiš (1) - 0:16; Richard Jarůšek (1) - pp - 10:08
12:30 - pp - Brian Ihnačák (1)		Second period		No scoring
0:56 - Martin Pláněk (1); 17:13 - Rastislav Dej (1)		Third period		Dominik Pacovský (1) - 2:27
No scoring		First overtime period		Marek Trončinský (1) - 1:12
Ondřej Kacetl (20 saves / 24 shots)		Goalie stats		David Rittich (37 saves / 40 shots)

March 18	BK Mladá Boleslav	3 – 2	SO	Mountfield HK	Ško-Energo Aréna
No scoring		First period		Stanislav Dietz (1) - 1:16
3:26 - Tomáš Hyka (1); 18:12 - Martin Látal (1)		Second period		No scoring
No scoring		Third period		Rudolf Červený (2) - 16:12
(miss) Lukáš Pabiška; (miss) Marek Trončinský; (miss) Jakub Klepiš; Richard Jarůšek		Shootout		Brian Ihnačák (miss); Jaroslav Kudrna (miss); Jaroslav Bednář (miss); Jiří Šimánek (miss)
David Rittich (40 saves / 42 shots)		Goalie stats		Ondřej Kacetl (34 saves / 36 shots)

March 19	BK Mladá Boleslav	5 – 4	SO	Mountfield HK	Ško-Energo Aréna
0:48 - Tomáš Klimenta (2); 8:04 - pp - Radan Lenc (1)		First period		No scoring
1:49 - Tomáš Urban (1)		Second period		Rudolf Červený (3) - 4:30; Jaroslav Kudrna (2) - 14:40; Jaroslav Bednář (1) - pp - 18:32
13:12 - Dominik Pacovský (2)		Third period		Peter Frühauf (1) - 14:48
(miss) Richard Jarůšek; (miss) Marek Trončinský; Jakub Klepiš		Shootout		Jaroslav Bednář (miss); Brian Ihnačák (miss); Adam Courchaine (miss)
David Rittich (36 saves / 40 shots)		Goalie stats		Ondřej Kacetl (28 saves / 32 shots)

March 22	Mountfield HK	4 – 2	BK Mladá Boleslav	ČPP Arena
18:56 - pp - Stanislav Dietz (2)		First period	No scoring
16:56 - Jaroslav Bednář (2)		Second period	No scoring
9:31 - Jaroslav Bednář (3); 10:47 - Jaroslav Bednář (4)		Third period	Radan Lenc (2) - 3:58; Jakub Klepis (2) - pp - 12:52
Ondřej Kacetl (30 saves / 32 shots)		Goalie stats	David Rittich (29 saves / 33 shots)

March 24	BK Mladá Boleslav	4 – 0	Mountfield HK	Ško-Energo Aréna
4:35 - pp - Tomáš Hyka (2); 10:51 - sh - Pavel Musil (2); 18:13 - Michal Bárta (1)		First period	No scoring
15:20 - Tomáš Hyka (3)		Second period	No scoring
No scoring		Third period	No scoring
David Rittich (30 saves / 30 shots)		Goalie stats	Ondřej Kacetl (32 saves / 36 shots)

Mladá Boleslav wins series 4 – 2

==== (2) HC Sparta Praha vs. (7) PSG Zlín ====
March 16	HC Sparta Praha	4 – 3	PSG Zlín	O2 Arena
11:39 - Petr Kumstát (1); 12:42 - Jan Hlaváč (1)		First period	No scoring
11:52 - Michal Dragoun (1)		Second period	Robert Říčka (1) - pp - 9:01
13:58 - pp - Michal Čajkovský (1)		Third period	Petr Holík (6) - 6:16
Danny Taylor (22 saves / 25 shots)		Goalie stats	Libor Kašík (26 saves / 30 shots)

March 17	HC Sparta Praha	0 – 4	PSG Zlín	O2 Arena
No scoring		First period	No scoring
No scoring		Second period	Roberts Bukarts (2) - pp - 7:32; Robert Říčka (2) - 13:27; Tomáš Čachotský (3) - 14:42
No scoring		Third period	Zdeněk Okál (1) - pp - 9:24
Danny Taylor (16 saves / 19 shots); Tomáš Pöpperle (11 saves / 12 shots)		Goalie stats	Libor Kašík (32 saves / 32 shots)

March 20	PSG Zlín	2 – 3	HC Sparta Praha	Trinity Bank Arena Luďka Čajky
5:53 - pp - Jiří Marušák (1)		First period	Daniel Přibyl (1) - pp - 7:11
2:20 - pp - Petr Holík (7)		Second period	Miroslav Forman (1) - pp - 12:00; Daniel Přibyl (2) - 15:16
No scoring		Third period	No scoring
Libor Kašík (23 saves / 26 shots)		Goalie stats	Tomáš Pöpperle (18 saves / 20 shots)

March 21	PSG Zlín	1 – 4	HC Sparta Praha	Trinity Bank Arena Luďka Čajky
No scoring		First period	Jaroslav Hlinka (1) - pp - 9:09
No scoring		Second period	Lukáš Pech (1) - 6:42; Jaroslav Hlinka (2) - pp - 16:34
11:19 - Zdeněk Okál (2)		Third period	Petr Kumstát (2) - en - 17:24
Libor Kašík (41 saves / 44 shots)		Goalie stats	Tomáš Pöpperle (27 saves / 28 shots)

March 23	HC Sparta Praha	5 – 2	PSG Zlín	O2 Arena
9:32 - Jaroslav Hlinka (3); 11:19 - Jaroslav Hlinka (3)		First period	No scoring
8:17 - Adam Polášek (1)		Second period	Tomáš Čachotský (4) - ps - 7:39
0:42 - Jaroslav Hlinka (4); 18:11 - sh - en - Lukáš Pech (2)		Third period	Robert Říčka (3) - 17:03
Tomáš Pöpperle (20 saves / 22 shots)		Goalie stats	Libor Kašík (27 saves / 31 shots)

Sparta Praha wins series 4 – 1

==== (4) HC Škoda Plzeň vs. (5) HC Olomouc ====
March 14	HC Škoda Plzeň	1 – 0	OT	HC Olomouc	Logspeed CZ Arena
No scoring		First period		No scoring
No scoring		Second period		No scoring
No scoring		Third period		No scoring
16:31 - pp - Tomáš Svoboda (1)		First overtime period		No scoring
Matěj Machovský (37 saves / 37 shots)		Goalie stats		Branislav Konrád (18 saves / 19 shots)

March 15	HC Škoda Plzeň	4 – 2	HC Olomouc	Logspeed CZ Arena
13:24 - Miroslav Preisinger (1)		First period	Roman Rác (1) - 4:52
16:20 - Branislav Kubka (1); 18:41 - pp - Miroslav Indrák (1)		Second period	No scoring
19:46 - en - Tomáš Svoboda (2)		Third period	Tomáš Houdek (1) - 18:44
Matěj Machovský (33 saves / 35 shots)		Goalie stats	Branislav Konrád (21 saves / 24 shots)

March 18	HC Olomouc	1 – 8	HC Škoda Plzeň	Zimní stadion Olomouc
No scoring		First period	Erik Hrňa (1) - 8:31; Jakub Lev (1) - 18:50
9:06 - pp - Dávid Buc (1)		Second period	Miroslav Indrák (2) - 0:38; Jakub Lev (2) - pp - 3:17
No scoring		Third period	Miroslav Indrák (3) - 2:47; Ondřej Kratěna (1) - 10:34; Ondřej Kratěna (2) - 16:39; Nick Johnson (1) - 19:50
Branislav Konrád (2 saves / 5 shots); Tomáš Vošvrda (15 saves / 20 shots)		Goalie stats	Matěj Machovský (32 saves / 33 shots)

March 19	HC Olomouc	2 – 1	HC Škoda Plzeň	Zimní stadion Olomouc
14:37 - Miroslav Holec (1)		First period	No scoring
No scoring		Second period	No scoring
15:09 - Matěj Pekr (1)		Third period	Jakub Lev (3) - pp - 14:20
Branislav Konrád (19 saves / 20 shots)		Goalie stats	Matěj Machovský (23 saves / 25 shots)

March 22	HC Škoda Plzeň	2 – 1	HC Olomouc	Logspeed CZ Arena
No scoring		First period	No scoring
2:15 - pp - Dominik Kubalík (1)		Second period	No scoring
8:28 - pp - Lukáš Pulpán (1)		Third period	Martin Vyrůbalík (1) - pp - 19:46
Matěj Machovský (30 saves / 31 shots)		Goalie stats	Branislav Konrád (20 saves / 22 shots)

Sparta Praha wins series 4 – 1

== Semifinals ==
=== (1) HC Bílí Tygři Liberec vs. (6) BK Mladá Boleslav ===
March 31	HC Bílí Tygři Liberec	4 – 3	BK Mladá Boleslav	Home Credit Arena
No scoring		First period	No scoring
2:54 - pp - Michal Bulíř (4); 18:39 - Jan Výtisk (1)		Second period	Richard Jarůšek (2) - pp - 1:42
11:49 - pp - Michal Birner (2); 12:18 - pp - Branko Radivojevič (2)		Third period	Jakub Klepis (3) - pp - 17:53; Dominik Pacovský (2) - pp - 19:51
Ján Lašák (22 saves / 25 shots)		Goalie stats	David Rittich (22 saves / 26 shots)

April 1	HC Bílí Tygři Liberec	5 – 2	BK Mladá Boleslav	Home Credit Arena
5:49 - Petr Vampola (2)		First period	Richard Jarůšek (3) - 17:38
1:37 - pp - Radim Šimek (1)		Second period	Marek Trončinský (2) - pp - 12:31
10:30 - Branko Radivojevič (3); 11:41 - Martin Bakoš (3); 13:04 - pp - Lukáš Krenželok (1)		Third period	No scoring
Ján Lašák (26 saves / 28 shots)		Goalie stats	David Rittich (34 saves / 39 shots)

April 4	BK Mladá Boleslav	0 – 3	HC Bílí Tygři Liberec	Ško-Energo Aréna
No scoring		First period	Michal Řepík (3) - 0:54; Petr Vampola (3) - pp - 8:33
No scoring		Second period	Tomáš Mojžíš (2) - pp - 10:30
No scoring		Third period	No scoring
David Rittich (22 saves / 25 shots)		Goalie stats	Ján Lašák (19 saves / 19 shots)

April 5	BK Mladá Boleslav	2 – 5	HC Bílí Tygři Liberec	Ško-Energo Aréna
13:10 - Dominik Pacovský (3)		First period	No scoring
17:10 - pp - Matěj Stříteský (1)		Second period	Michal Řepík (4) - pp - 4:13; Ondřej Vitásek (1) - 6:16; Michal Bulíř (5) - pp - 19:15
No scoring		Third period	Martin Bakoš (4) - pp - 16:49; Lukáš Krenželok (2) - en - 19:57
David Rittich (26 saves / 30 shots)		Goalie stats	Ján Lašák (18 saves / 20 shots)

Liberec won series 4 – 0

==== (2) HC Sparta Praha vs. (4) HC Škoda Plzeň ====
March 29	HC Sparta Praha	3 – 7	HC Škoda Plzeň	O2 Arena
No scoring		First period	Miroslav Indrák (4) - 7:16; Nick Johnson (2) - 15:26; Nick Johnson (3) - pp - 18:57
2:52 - pp - Jaroslav Hlinka (5); 16:31 - pp - Adam Polášek (2)		Second period	Jakub Lev (4) - pp - 12:42
16:44 - Andrej Kudrna (1)		Third period	Erik Hrňa (2) - pp - 7:45; Erik Hrňa (3) - 14:35; Jaroslav Kracík (1) - 17:04
Tomáš Pöpperle (11 saves / 14 shots); Danny Taylor (12 saves / 16 shots)		Goalie stats	Matěj Machovský (31 saves / 34 shots)

March 30	HC Sparta Praha	4 – 3	HC Škoda Plzeň	O2 Arena
6:26 - Daniel Přibyl (3); 7:40 - Michal Barinka (1)		First period
8:11 - Lukáš Pech (3); 11:01 - pp - Daniel Přibyl (4)		Second period	Nick Johnson (3) - pp - 16:23; Ondřej Kratěna (3) - sh - 19:!8
No scoring		Third period	Jaroslav Kracík (2) - 6:15
Tomáš Pöpperle (31 saves / 34 shots)		Goalie stats	Matěj Machovský (23 saves / 27 shots); Patrik Polívka (8 saves / 8 shots)

April 2	HC Škoda Plzeň	2 – 4	HC Sparta Praha	Logspeed CZ Arena
9:35 - Tomáš Svoboda (3)		First period	Andrej Kudrna (2) - 13:12
No scoring		Second period	Jan Buchtele (1) - 17:42; Miroslav Forman (2) - 18:35
5:29 - Tomáš Svoboda (4)		Third period	Daniel Přibyl (5) - en - 18:49
Matěj Machovský (26 saves / 29 shots)		Goalie stats	Tomáš Pöpperle (33 saves / 35 shots)

March 19	HC Škoda Plzeň	2 – 1	HC Sparta Praha	Logspeed CZ Arena
No scoring		First period	No scoring
No scoring		Second period	Miroslav Forman (3) - pp - 14:09
0:33 - Miroslav Indrák (5); 9:51 - pp - Ondřej Kratěna (4)		Third period	No scoring
Matěj Machovský (41 saves / 42 shots)		Goalie stats	Tomáš Pöpperle (33 saves / 35 shots)

April 6	HC Sparta Praha	6 – 1	HC Škoda Plzeň	O2 Arena
No scoring		First period	No scoring
8:07 - Lukáš Pech (4); 10:18 - pp - Jaroslav Hlinka (6); 12:40 - Jaroslav Hlinka (7); 19:22 - pp - Michal Barinka (2)		Second period	Michal Špaček (1) - 1:52
5:53 - pp - Andrej Kudrna (3); 6:32 - Michal Barinka (3)		Third period	No scoring
Tomáš Pöpperle (26 saves / 27 shots)		Goalie stats	Matěj Machovský (33 saves / 39 shots); Patrik Polívka (3 saves / 3 shots)

April 8	HC Škoda Plzeň	2 – 3	OT	HC Sparta Praha	Logspeed CZ Arena
0:37 - Mário Bližňák (1)		First period		Adam Polášek (3) - pp - 6:58; Michal Barinka (4) - 12:54
19:04 - Lukáš Pulpán (2)		Second period		No scoring
No scoring		Third period		No scoring
No scoring		First overtime period		Lukáš Pech (5) - 12:34
Matěj Machovský (38 saves / 41 shots)		Goalie stats		Tomáš Pöpperle (28 saves / 30 shots)

Sparta Praha wins series 4 – 2

== Final ==
=== (1) HC Bílí Tygři Liberec vs. (2) BK Mladá Boleslav ===
April 14	HC Bílí Tygři Liberec	1 – 3	HC Sparta Praha	Home Credit Arena
12:14 - pp - Michal Řepík (5)		First period	No scoring
No scoring		Second period	Miroslav Forman (4) - 10:06; Jaroslav Hlinka (8) - 16:53
No scoring		Third period	Jan Buchtele (2) - pp - 8:39
Ján Lašák (22 saves / 25 shots)		Goalie stats	Tomáš Pöpperle (32 saves / 33 shots)

April 15	HC Bílí Tygři Liberec	4 – 2	HC Sparta Praha	Home Credit Arena
7:44 - sh - Jakub Valský (1)		First period	Curtis Hamilton (1) - 9:10; Miroslav Forman (4) - 10:11
11:25 - Michal Řepík (6); 19:10 - pp - Branko Radivojevič (4)		Second period	No scoring
19:00 - en - Petr Vampola (4)		Third period	No scoring
Ján Lašák (21 saves / 23 shots)		Goalie stats	Tomáš Pöpperle (37 saves / 40 shots)

April 18	HC Sparta Praha	4 – 1	HC Bílí Tygři Liberec	O2 Arena
No scoring		First period	No scoring
9:02 - pp - Jan Buchtele (3); 17:21 - pp - Jaroslav Hlinka (9); 17:43 - pp - Juraj Mikuš (1); 19:02 - Jan Hlaváč (2)		Second period	No scoring
No scoring		Third period	Radim Šimek (1) - 1:23
Tomáš Pöpperle (22 saves / 23 shots)		Goalie stats	Ján Lašák (19 saves / 23 shots); Marek Schwarz (8 saves / 8 shots)

April 19	HC Sparta Praha	1 – 4	HC Bílí Tygři Liberec	O2 Arena
No scoring		First period	No scoring
No scoring		Second period	Michal Řepík (7) - 1:40; Jaroslav Vlach (1) - 2:51; Michal Bulíř (6) - 17:30
16:51 - Jan Švrček (1)		Third period	Radim Šimek (2) - en - 18:22
Tomáš Pöpperle (30 saves / 33 shots)		Goalie stats	Marek Schwarz (19 saves / 20 shots)

April 22	HC Bílí Tygři Liberec	4 – 3	HC Sparta Praha	Home Credit Arena
17:17 - Michal Řepík (8)		First period	Lukáš Pech (6) - 16:33; Robert Sabolič (1) - pp - 19:30
14:54 - Branko Radivojevič (5)		Second period	No scoring
2:36 - sh - Jaroslav Vlach (2); 15:57 - Michal Řepík (9)		Third period	Miroslav Forman (5) - pp - 3:23
Marek Schwarz (10 saves / 12 shots); Ján Lašák (10 saves / 11 shots)		Goalie stats	Tomáš Pöpperle (29 saves / 33 shots)

April 24	HC Sparta Praha	1 – 2	2OT	HC Bílí Tygři Liberec	O2 Arena
16:34 - pp - Juraj Mikúš (2)		First period		No scoring
No scoring		Second period		Petr Vampola (5) - pp - 8:37
No scoring		Third period		No scoring
No scoring		Second overtime period		Martin Bakoš (5) - 5:09
Tomáš Pöpperle (43 saves / 45 shots)		Goalie stats		Ján Lašák (19 saves / 20 shots)

Liberec won series 4 – 2

== Relegation ==
Place	Team	GP	W	OTW	OTL	L	GF	GA	Pts
1	HC Vítkovice Steel	58	19	6	5	28	155	161	74
2	HC Dynamo Pardubice	58	19	4	5	30	129	170	70
3	HC Verva Litvínov	58	13	12	6	27	130	149	69
4	HC Energie Karlovy Vary	58	13	3	3	39	122	200	48
