= Klimenta (surname) =

Klimenta is a surname. Notable people with the surname include:

- Emrah Klimenta (born 1991), Montenegrin footballer
- Tomáš Klimenta (born 1984), Czech ice hockey player
