= ČEZ Aréna =

ČEZ Aréna may refer to:

- ČEZ Aréna (Ostrava), in Ostrava, Czech Republic
- ČEZ Aréna (Plzeň), in Plzeň, Czech Republic
- Enteria arena, formerly known as ČEZ Aréna, in Pardubice, Czech Republic
