= Ondřej Kratěna =

Czech former ice hockey forward (born 1977)

- Born: 21 April 1977 (age 47); Čeladná, Czechoslovakia
- Height: 5 ft 9 in (175 cm)
- Weight: 176 lb (80 kg; 12 st 8 lb)
- Position: Right wing
- Shot: Left
- Played for: HC Olomouc; HC Vsetín; HC Sparta Praha; Kärpät; HC Plzeň
- National team: Czech Republic
- Playing career: 1994–2019

Ondřej Kratěna (born 21 April 1977) is a Czech former ice hockey forward who last played for HC Plzeň in the Czech Extraliga.

Kratěna began his career with HC Olomouc where he played for two seasons. After an impressive second season where he posted eleven goals and eleven assists, he signed with HC Vsetín. After three championship winning seasons he moved to Sparta Prague and remained at the team for eight seasons, winning four more Czech titles. In 2007, he moved to Finland's SM-liiga for Oulun Kärpät and won the regular season championship and the SM-liiga playoffs championship. In 2008, Kratěna returned to Sparta Prague.

== Career statistics ==
			Regular season					Playoffs
Season	Team	League	GP	G	A	Pts	PIM	GP	G	A	Pts	PIM
1994–95	HC Olomouc U20	Czech U20	27	26	25	51	—	—	—	—	—	—
1994–95	HC Olomouc	Czech	12	3	2	5	0	—	—	—	—	—
1995–96	HC Olomouc	Czech	36	11	11	22	2	4	1	1	2	2
1996–97	VHK Vsetín	Czech	47	16	19	35	6	10	3	2	5	0
1997–98	VHK Vsetín	Czech	47	12	15	27	12	10	3	4	7	2
1998–99	VHK Vsetín	Czech	41	8	11	19	12	12	3	5	8	0
1999–00	HC Sparta Praha	Czech	48	16	12	28	16	3	0	1	1	0
2000–01	HC Sparta Praha	Czech	51	16	16	32	12	13	3	3	6	0
2001–02	HC Sparta Praha	Czech	34	10	25	35	27	12	12	6	18	2
2002–03	HC Sparta Praha	Czech	32	14	11	25	2	10	5	0	5	4
2003–04	HC Sparta Praha	Czech	33	16	13	29	6	8	0	3	3	2
2004–05	HC Sparta Praha	Czech	36	12	12	24	2	1	0	0	0	0
2005–06	HC Sparta Praha	Czech	48	17	19	36	14	17	3	9	12	6
2006–07	HC Sparta Praha	Czech	45	21	13	34	12	13	6	4	10	0
2007–08	Kärpät	Liiga	46	14	17	31	10	13	2	4	6	0
2008–09	HC Sparta Praha	Czech	47	21	25	46	34	11	3	4	7	4
2009–10	HC Sparta Praha	Czech	43	10	20	30	10	6	0	1	1	6
2010–11	HC Sparta Praha	Czech	21	1	2	3	4	—	—	—	—	—
2011–12	HC Plzeň 1929	Czech	37	7	16	23	16	12	2	4	6	8
2012–13	HC Plzeň	Czech	41	10	19	29	12	17	6	7	13	2
2013–14	HC Plzeň	Czech	43	12	12	24	18	6	2	3	5	2
2014–15	HC Plzeň	Czech	42	10	19	29	4	—	—	—	—	—
2015–16	HC Plzeň	Czech	45	8	22	30	22	11	4	9	13	2
2016–17	HC Plzeň	Czech	47	11	15	26	10	11	4	7	11	4
2017–18	HC Plzeň	Czech	41	11	18	29	8	10	0	4	4	0
2018–19	HC Plzeň	Czech	34	5	13	18	14	4	0	0	0	0
Czech totals			951	278	360	638	275	201	60	77	137	46
