= Matěj Machovský =

Czech professional ice hockey goaltender (born 1993)

- Born: 25 July 1993 (age 33) Opava, Czech Republic
- Height: 6 ft 2 in (188 cm)
- Weight: 201 lb (91 kg; 14 st 5 lb)
- Position: Goaltender
- Catches: Right
- ELH team Former teams: HC Vítkovice; HC Plzeň; Grand Rapids Griffins; HC Sparta Praha; Dinamo Riga; KalPa; Mountfield HK
- National team: Czech Republic
- NHL draft: Undrafted
- Playing career: 2013–present

Matěj Machovský (born 25 July 1993) is a Czech professional ice hockey goaltender currently under contract with HC Vítkovice Ridera of the Czech Extraliga (ELH).

== Playing career ==
Machovský spent three seasons in the Ontario Hockey League (OHL) prior to beginning his professional career. In 112 games with the Brampton Battalion and five with the Guelph Storm, he posted a 56–45–13 record, 2.54 goals-against average (GAA), 0.901 save percentage and nine shutouts. Machovsky was named to the 2011 Second All-Rookie Team and won the Dinty Moore Trophy for having the best goals-against average (2.90) by a rookie goaltender.

Machovský has spent the last four seasons playing for HC Plzeň of the Czech Extraliga. During the 2013–14 season, as a first-year pro, he led the Czech Extraliga in save percentage (0.936), alongside a career-best 1.67 GAA and six shutouts. During the 2015–16 season, he posted a personal-best 26 wins and ranked eighth among goalies who played in 25-or-more games with a 2.43 GAA, while finishing third with a 0.920 save percentage. HC Plzeň reached the semifinals in the Czech Extraliga playoffs, where he led the league with a 0.932 save percentage. During the 2016–17 season, Machovsky posted a 21–25–0 record with a 2.25 GAA and 0.925 save percentage, while adding two shutouts.

On 2 May 2017, Machovský signed a one-year contract with the Detroit Red Wings. On 25 September 2017, Machovský was assigned to the Red Wings' AHL affiliate, the Grand Rapids Griffins to begin the 2017–18 season. Machovský was unable to make an impact within the Red Wings organization, playing just four games with the Griffins, while spending the majority of his contract with second tier affiliate, the Toledo Walleye of the ECHL.

As an impending restricted free agent, Machovský opted to return to his native Czech Republic, agreeing to a three-year contract with HC Sparta Praha of the Czech Extraliga on 1 May 2018.

Following three seasons with Sparta Praha, Machovský agreed as a free agent to a one-year contract with Latvian-based KHL club, Dinamo Riga, on 22 April 2021.

== Awards and honours ==
Award	Year
OHL
F. W. "Dinty" Moore Trophy- Best Rookie GAA	2011
Second All-Rookie Team	2011
ELH
Best SVS%	2014
Playoffs Best SVS%	2016
International
WJC18 Top 3 player on Team	2011
