= Jaroslav Kracík =

Czech ice hockey player

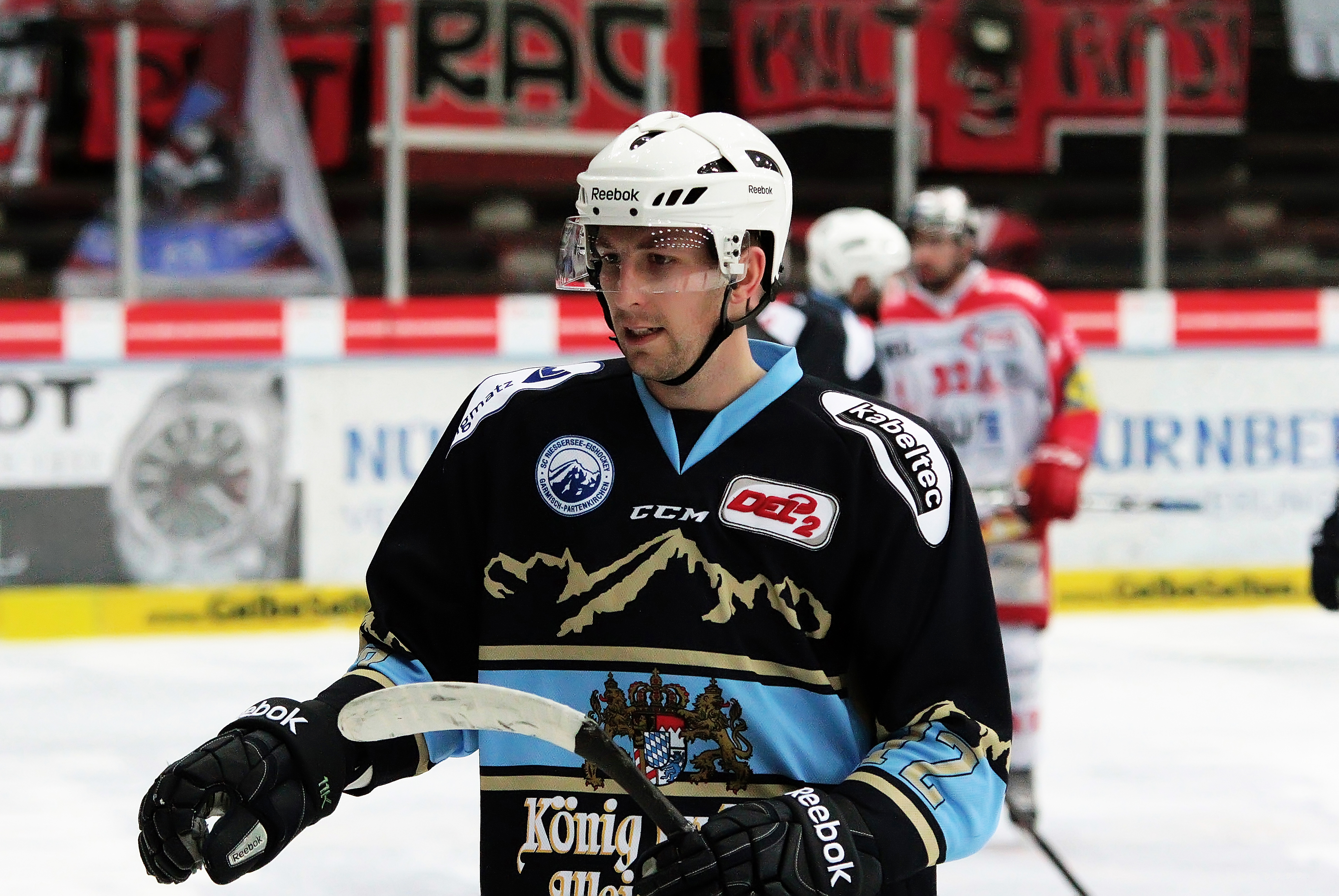
- Image of Jaroslav Kracik playing for the SC Riessersee during the 2013/14 season
- Born: 18 January 1983 (age 43) Plzeň, Czechoslovakia
- Height: 6 ft 0 in (183 cm)
- Weight: 185 lb (84 kg; 13 st 3 lb)
- Position: Right wing
- Shoots: Left
- Czech Extraliga team: HC Litvínov
- NHL draft: 231st overall, 2002; Columbus Blue Jackets
- Playing career: 2001–present

Jaroslav Kracík (born 18 January 1983) is a Czech professional ice hockey player. He was selected by the Columbus Blue Jackets in the 8th round (231st overall) of the 2002 NHL entry draft.

Kracík played with HC Litvínov in the Czech Extraliga during the 2010–11 season.

== Career statistics ==
			Regular season					Playoffs
Season	Team	League	GP	G	A	Pts	PIM	GP	G	A	Pts	PIM
1999–2000	HC Keramika Plzeň	CZE U18	40	30	34	64	26	5	1	2	3	2
1999–2000	HC Keramika Plzeň	CZE U20	3	1	0	1	4	—	—	—	—	—
2000–01	HC Keramika Plzeň	CZE U20	36	15	20	35	10	—	—	—	—	—
2001–02	HC Keramika Plzeň	CZE U20	38	14	35	49	46	—	—	—	—	—
2001–02	HC Keramika Plzeň	ELH	4	0	1	1	0	2	0	0	0	0
2001–02	HC Klatovy	CZE.3	6	5	3	8	0	—	—	—	—	—
2002–03	HC Keramika Plzeň	CZE U20	33	11	17	28	40	—	—	—	—	—
2002–03	HC Keramika Plzeň	ELH	4	0	0	0	0	—	—	—	—	—
2002–03	HC Slovan Ústečtí Lvi	CZE.2	9	1	1	2	4	4	0	0	0	0
2003–04	HC Lasselsberger Plzeň	CZE U20	46	32	47	79	107	—	—	—	—	—
2003–04	HC Lasselsberger Plzeň	ELH	19	2	2	4	18	12	0	6	6	2
2004–05	HC Lasselsberger Plzeň	ELH	41	5	11	16	2	—	—	—	—	—
2004–05	IHC Písek	CZE.2	1	0	0	0	0	—	—	—	—	—
2005–06	HC Lasselsberger Plzeň	ELH	47	6	26	32	26	—	—	—	—	—
2006–07	HC Lasselsberger Plzeň	ELH	31	3	9	12	26	—	—	—	—	—
2007–08	HC Lasselsberger Plzeň	ELH	48	7	19	26	73	3	0	0	0	0
2008–09	HC Lasselsberger Plzeň	ELH	50	11	31	42	38	14	5	3	8	8
2009–10	HC Plzeň 1929	ELH	21	1	4	5	12	—	—	—	—	—
2009–10	BK Mladá Boleslav	ELH	20	1	8	9	12	—	—	—	—	—
2010–11	HC BENZINA Litvínov	ELH	43	4	9	13	22	5	0	0	0	4
2011–12	Landshut Cannibals	GER.2	46	10	41	51	78	14	5	11	16	16
2012–13	Landshut Cannibals	GER.2	32	4	22	26	16	6	2	6	8	4
2013–14	SC Riessersee	DEL2	27	7	22	29	24	5	1	2	3	4
2014–15	SC Riessersee	DEL2	40	13	33	46	40	3	0	1	1	4
2015–16	HC Škoda Plzeň	ELH	50	11	29	40	40	11	2	5	7	6
2016–17	HC Škoda Plzeň	ELH	47	5	20	25	36	11	1	1	2	10
2017–18	HC Škoda Plzeň	ELH	52	8	21	29	24	10	1	6	7	0
2018–19	HC Škoda Plzeň	ELH	48	9	12	21	28	14	1	5	6	12
2019–20	HC Škoda Plzeň	ELH	31	7	7	14	14	—	—	—	—	—
2020–21	HC Škoda Plzeň	ELH	42	7	18	25	54	3	0	1	1	0
2021–22	HC Stadion Litoměřice	CZE.2	30	13	16	29	20	4	1	5	6	0
2021–22	HC Energie Karlovy Vary	ELH	13	3	5	8	6	—	—	—	—	—
ELH totals			611	90	232	322	431	85	10	27	37	42
