= Marek Trončinský =

Czech ice hockey player (1988–2021)

Marek “Megatron” Trončinský
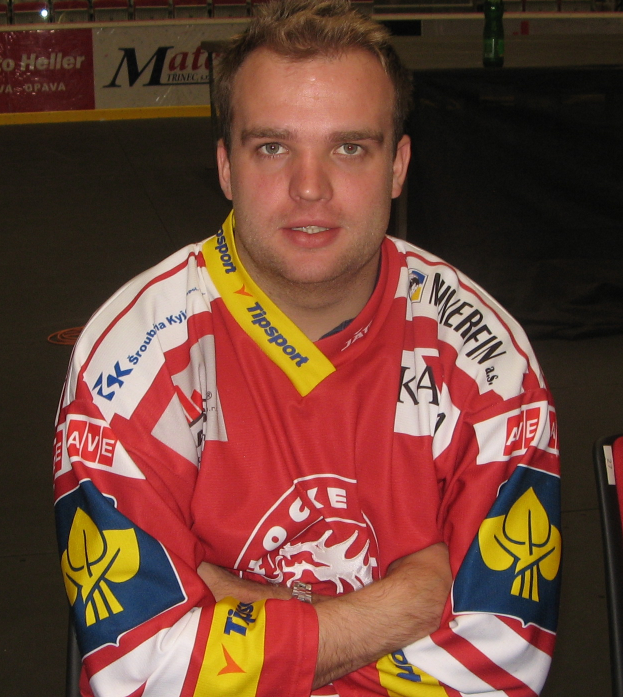
- Born: 13 September 1988 Usti nad Labem, Czechoslovakia
- Died: 22 May 2021 (aged 32)
- Position: Defence
- Shot: Left
- Erste Liga team Former teams: Gyergyói HK; HC Litvínov; HC Bílí Tygři Liberec; HC Dynamo Pardubice; BK Mlada Boleslav; HC Ocelari Trinec; HC Slovan Bratislava; Yugra Khanty-Mansiysk; Sheffield Steelers
- Playing career: 2003–2021

Marek Trončinský (13 September 1988 – 22 May 2021) was a Czech professional ice hockey defenceman who played his last games with CS Progym Gheorgheni in the Erste Liga. Before that he was with UK EIHL side Sheffield Steelers. Trončinský also previously represented HC Bílí Tygři Liberec in the Czech Extraliga.

Trončinský previously played for HC Kladno (2005–2010), SK Horácká Slavia Třebíč, HC Slovan Ústečtí Lvi, Khanty-Mansiysk Yugra, HC Slovan Bratislava, Trinec Ocelari HC, Mlada Boleslav BK, Pardubice HC, and Litvinov HC.

== Career statistics ==
			Regular season					Playoffs
Season	Team	League	GP	G	A	Pts	PIM	GP	G	A	Pts	PIM
2003–04	HC Slovan Ústečtí Lvi U18	Czech U18	52	3	10	13	58	—	—	—	—	—
2004–05	HC Litvinov U18	Czech U18	46	11	14	25	124	2	0	1	1	6
2005–06	HC Kladno U20	Czech U20	44	10	13	23	82	7	0	1	1	12
2005–06	HC Kladno	Czech	4	0	2	2	0	—	—	—	—	—
2006–07	HC Kladno U20	Czech U20	19	2	6	8	109	5	0	1	1	8
2006–07	HC Kladno	Czech	27	0	0	0	20	—	—	—	—	—
2006–07	BK Mladá Boleslav	Czech2	1	0	0	0	0	—	—	—	—	—
2007–08	HC Kladno U20	Czech U20	15	3	15	18	10	—	—	—	—	—
2007–08	HC Kladno	Czech	23	0	0	0	20	9	1	2	3	20
2007–08	SK Horácká Slavia Třebíč	Czech2	15	0	5	5	22	—	—	—	—	—
2008–09	HC Kladno	Czech	27	0	0	0	32	—	—	—	—	—
2008–09	SK Horácká Slavia Třebíč	Czech2	17	0	8	8	37	—	—	—	—	—
2008–09	HC Berounští Medvědi	Czech2	2	0	0	0	0	—	—	—	—	—
2009–10	HC Kladno	Czech	46	2	6	8	36	—	—	—	—	—
2009–10	HC Berounští Medvědi	Czech2	2	0	1	1	2	—	—	—	—	—
2009–10	HC Slovan Ústečtí Lvi	Czech2	3	1	1	2	4	3	1	0	1	4
2010–11	Bílí Tygři Liberec	Czech	52	6	8	14	34	7	1	5	6	4
2010–11	HC Benátky nad Jizerou	Czech2	1	0	0	0	0	—	—	—	—	—
2011–12	Bílí Tygři Liberec	Czech	48	5	23	28	34	11	1	2	3	10
2012–13	Yugra Khanty-Mansiysk	KHL	52	5	18	23	42	—	—	—	—	—
2013–14	Yugra Khanty-Mansiysk	KHL	35	7	7	14	22	—	—	—	—	—
2013–14	HC Slovan Bratislava	KHL	6	0	0	0	4	—	—	—	—	—
2013–14	HC Oceláři Třinec	Czech	12	1	3	4	33	11	2	1	3	6
2014–15	HC Oceláři Třinec	Czech	35	2	12	14	50	12	0	1	1	16
2014–15	BK Mladá Boleslav	Czech	14	2	6	8	14	—	—	—	—	—
2015–16	BK Mladá Boleslav	Czech	48	3	25	28	36	10	2	3	5	12
2016–17	BK Mladá Boleslav	Czech	37	2	15	17	65	—	—	—	—	—
2016–17	HC Dynamo Pardubice	Czech	10	2	8	10	8	—	—	—	—	—
2017–18	HC Dynamo Pardubice	Czech	51	6	31	37	64	7	0	5	5	6
2018–19	HC Dynamo Pardubice	Czech	22	3	8	11	43	—	—	—	—	—
2018–19	HC Litvínov	Czech	16	3	8	11	26	—	—	—	—	—
2019–20	HC Litvínov	Czech	5	0	0	0	4	—	—	—	—	—
2019–20	Sheffield Steelers	EIHL	43	12	30	42	40	—	—	—	—	—
2020–21	Gyergyói HK	Erste Liga	26	5	21	26	36	3	0	2	2	—
2020–21	Gyergyói HK	Romania	13	2	15	17	10	6	0	7	7	10
KHL totals			93	12	25	37	68	—	—	—	—	—
Czech totals			477	37	155	192	519	67	7	19	26	74
