= Tomáš Pöpperle =

Czech ice hockey player

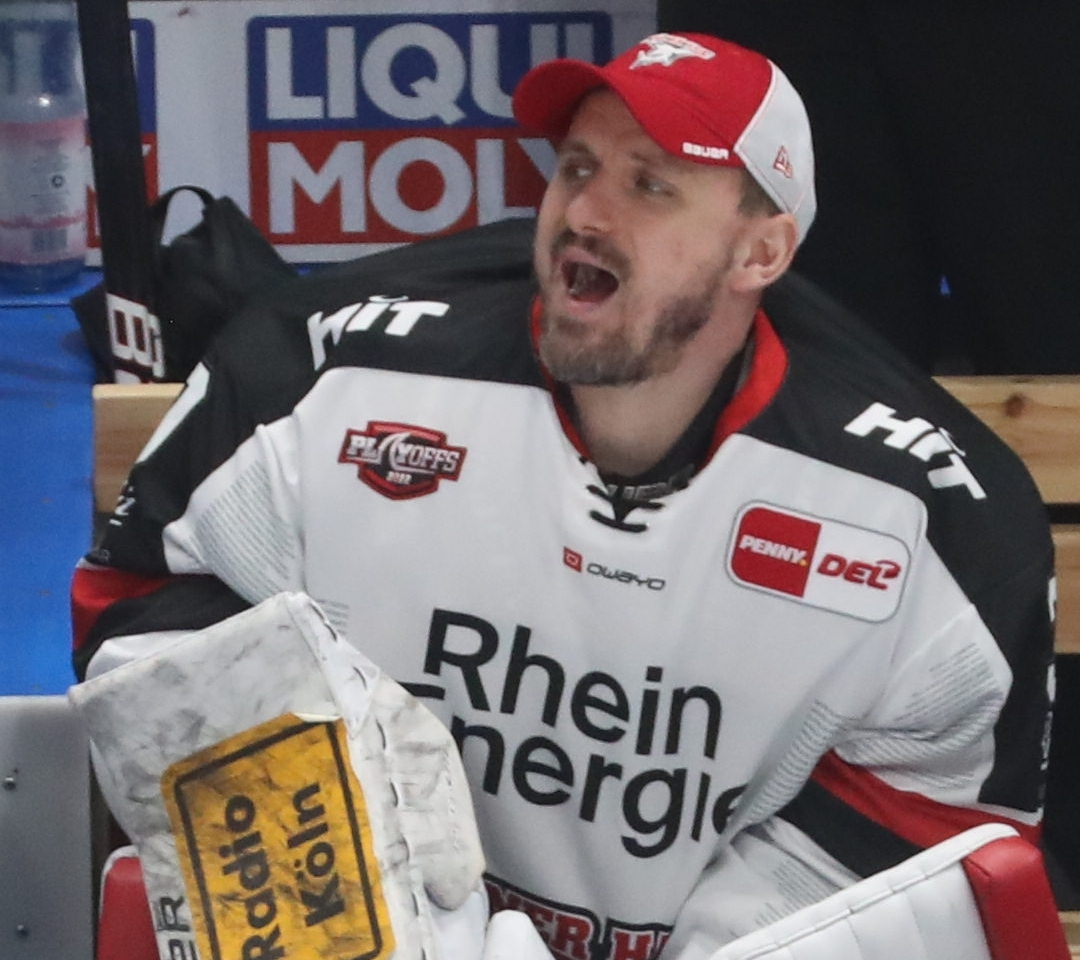
- Pöpperle with the Kölner Haie in 2022
- Born: October 10, 1984 (age 41) Broumov, Czechoslovakia
- Height: 6 ft 1 in (185 cm)
- Weight: 187 lb (85 kg; 13 st 5 lb)
- Position: Goaltender
- Caught: Left
- Played for: HC Sparta Praha; Eisbären Berlin; Columbus Blue Jackets; HC Plzeň; HC Lev Praha; HC Sochi; Syracuse Crunch; Fischtown Pinguins
- NHL draft: 131st overall, 2005; Columbus Blue Jackets
- Playing career: 2003–2024

Tomáš Pöpperle (born October 10, 1984) is a Czech former professional ice hockey goaltender. He was originally selected by the Columbus Blue Jackets, 131st overall, in the 2005 NHL entry draft, and played 2 games for them during the 2006–07 season. The rest of his career, which started in 2003, was spent in the Deutsche Eishockey Liga (DEL) and Czech Extraliga.

== Playing career ==
Pöpperle played two games for the Columbus Blue Jackets during the 2006–07 season. However, he spent most of that year playing with the Blue Jackets American Hockey League affiliate the Syracuse Crunch. After a second season with the Crunch, Pöpperle returned to Europe to play for HC Sparta Praha. He signed with newly formed Kontinental Hockey League team HC Lev Praha in 2012.

In 2014, he signed with another newly formed team, HC Sochi, also in the KHL. He rejoined HC Sparta Praha for the 2015–16 season.

== Career statistics ==
=== Regular season and playoffs ===
			Regular season										Playoffs
Season	Team	League	GP	W	L	T	OTL	MIN	GA	SO	GAA	SV%	GP	W	L	MIN	GA	SO	GAA	SV%
1999–00	Sparta Praha U18	CZE U18	47	—	—	—	—	—	—	—	1.66	.926	7	—	—	—	—	—	2.00	.918
2000–01	Sparta Praha U18	CZE U18	42	—	—	—	—	—	—	—	2.10	.920	—	—	—	—	—	—	—	—
2001–02	Sparta Praha U20	CZE U20	29	—	—	—	—	1653	65	2	2.36	.920	5	—	—	320	15	0	2.81	.919
2002–03	Sparta Praha U20	CZE U20	28	—	—	—	—	1500	52	2	2.08	.927	2	—	—	—	—	—	2.00	.923
2003–04	Sparta Praha U20	CZE U20	30	—	—	—	—	1778	60	4	2.02	.940	—	—	—	—	—	—	—	—
2003–04	HC Příbram	CZE-3	2	—	—	—	—	60	2	0	2.00	—	—	—	—	—	—	—	—	—
2003–04	HC Berounští Medvědi	CZE-2	5	—	—	—	—	205	7	0	1.38	.953	2	—	—	120	4	0	2.00	.929
2003–04	Sparta Praha	CZE	—	—	—	—	—	—	—	—	—	—	1	—	—	11	0	0	0.00	1.000
2004–05	HC Berounští Medvědi	CZE-2	16	—	—	—	—	966	29	1	1.80	.940	2	—	—	120	5	0	2.50	.951
2004–05	Sparta Praha	CZE	25	15	9	0	—	1325	35	4	1.58	.949	2	—	—	12	4	0	20.00	.600
2005–06	Eisbären Berlin	DEL	31	—	—	—	—	1845	67	3	2.18	.929	11	10	1	655	23	1	2.11	.927
2006–07	Columbus Blue Jackets	NHL	2	0	0	—	0	45	1	0	1.35	.929	—	—	—	—	—	—	—	—
2006–07	Syracuse Crunch	AHL	49	25	19	—	4	2833	135	4	2.86	.905	—	—	—	—	—	—	—	—
2007–08	Syracuse Crunch	AHL	17	7	8	—	0	890	44	1	2.97	.900	—	—	—	—	—	—	—	—
2008–09	Sparta Praha	CZE	41	22	19	—	0	2361	106	2	2.69	.918	1	0	1	32	4	0	7.50	.750
2009–10	HC Plzeň	CZE	35	26	9	—	0	2124	78	2	2.20	.925	6	2	4	357	19	1	3.19	.899
2010–11	Sparta Praha	CZE	50	20	30	—	0	3247	136	6	2.51	.916	—	—	—	—	—	—	—	—
2011–12	Sparta Praha	CZE	46	30	16	—	0	2819	95	5	2.02	.935	5	2	3	308	14	0	2.73	.902
2012–13	Lev Praha	KHL	38	18	19	—	0	2271	85	6	2.25	.917	4	0	4	282	11	0	2.34	.906
2013–14	Sparta Praha	CZE	44	30	14	—	0	2572	69	11	1.61	.936	12	7	5	784	27	1	2.07	.919
2014–15	HC Sochi	KHL	45	21	18	—	0	2417	108	2	2.68	.912	—	—	—	—	—	—	—	—
2015–16	Sparta Praha	CZE	35	24	11	—	0	1938	77	3	2.38	.912	16	9	7	925	33	0	2.14	.929
2016–17	Sparta Praha	CZE	39	20	19	—	0	2263	84	4	2.23	.911	4	0	4	—	—	—	4.00	.848
2017–18	Fischtown Pinguins	DEL	46	22	22	—	0	2615	126	4	2.89	.909	7	3	4	—	—	—	3.61	.887
2018–19	Fischtown Pinguins	DEL	44	24	17	—	0	2412	111	3	2.76	.893	3	1	2	—	—	—	2.48	.897
2019–20	Fischtown Pinguins	DEL	25	10	15	—	0	1460	64	3	2.63	.908	—	—	—	—	—	—	—	—
2020–21	Fischtown Pinguins	DEL	13	7	6	—	0	743	29	0	2.34	.924	—	—	—	—	—	—	—	—
NHL totals			2	0	0	—	0	45	1	0	1.35	.929	—	—	—	—	—	—	—	—

=== International ===
Year	Team	Event	GP	W	L	T	MIN	GA	SO	GAA	SV%
2000	Czech Republic	WJC	2	0	0	0	31	2	0	3.93	.714
Junior totals			2	0	0	0	31	2	0	3.93	.714

== Transactions ==
- July 30, 2005 - Drafted by the Columbus Blue Jackets in the 5th round, 131st overall.
