= Daniel Přibyl =

Czech professional ice hockey forward (born 1992)

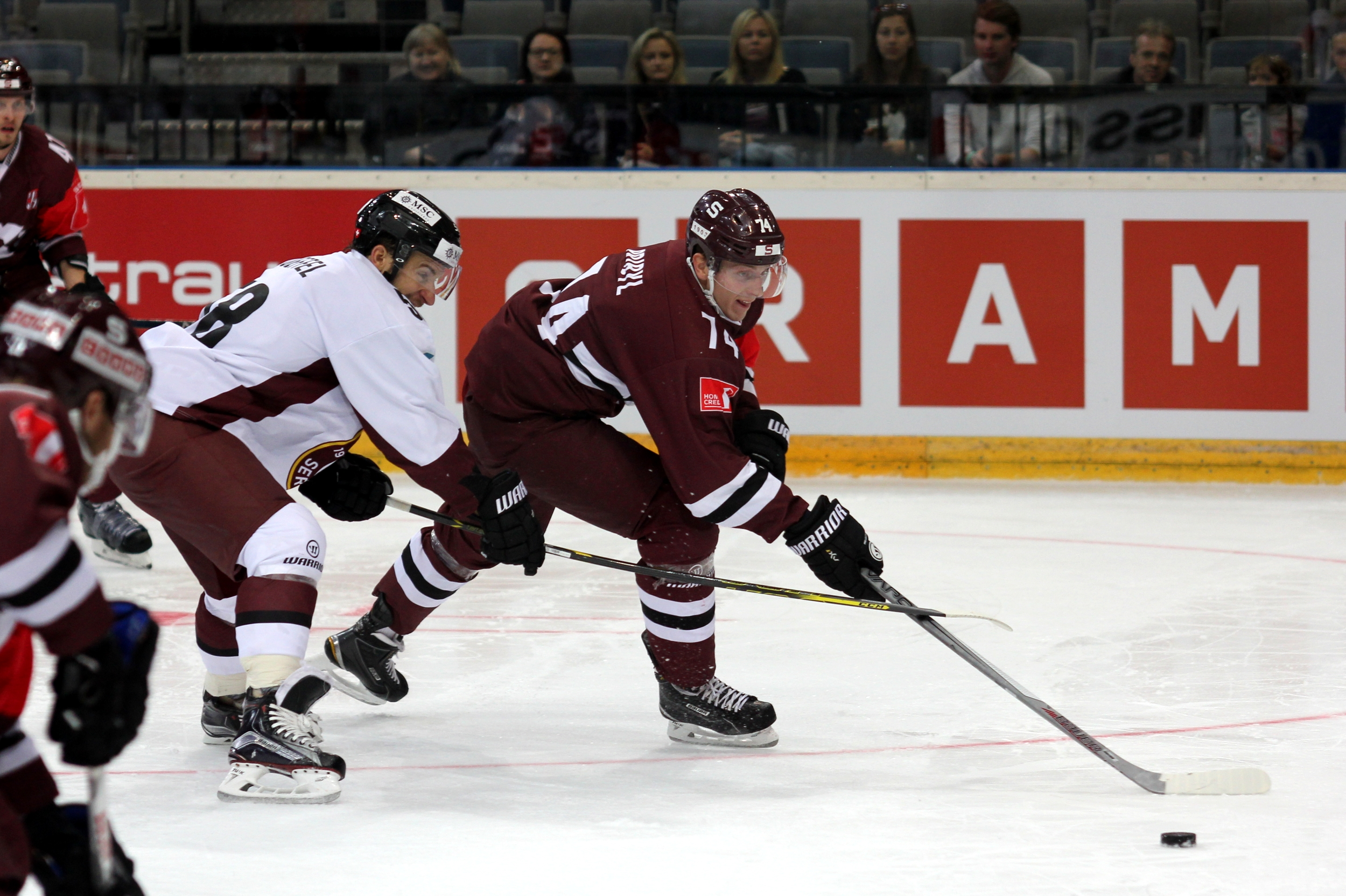
- Born: December 18, 1992 (age 33) Písek, Czechoslovakia
- Height: 6 ft 3 in (191 cm)
- Weight: 217 lb (98 kg; 15 st 7 lb)
- Position: Forward
- Shot: Right
- Played for: HC Sparta Praha; BK Mladá Boleslav
- NHL draft: 168th overall, 2011; Montreal Canadiens
- Playing career: 2011–2023

Daniel Přibyl (born December 18, 1992) is a Czech former professional ice hockey forward. He was selected in the sixth round, 168th overall, by the Montreal Canadiens in the 2011 NHL entry draft.

== Playing career ==
Undrafted, Přibyl played in his native Czech Republic, with HC Sparta Praha of the Czech Extraliga. After making his professional debut in the 2010–11 season with Praha as an 18-year-old, he was selected in the sixth round, 168th overall, by the Montreal Canadiens in the 2011 NHL entry draft.

With his rights later relinquished by the Canadiens, Přibyl opted to continue his career with Sparta Praha, developing into a top-line scoring threat in the Extraliga.

On April 22, 2016, Přibyl was signed by the Calgary Flames of the National Hockey League (NHL), to a two-year, entry-level contract as an unrestricted free agent. In his debut North American season in 2016–17, Přibyl was assigned to the Flames American Hockey League affiliate, the Stockton Heat. He appeared in 33 games, contributing offensively with 5 goals and 15 points.

Approaching the final year of his contract for the 2017–18 season, Přibyl was injured in the lead up to training camp, suffering an Anterior Cruciate Ligament tear that required surgery, ruling him out for the entirety of the campaign.

With his career stalling through injury and with the conclusion of his contract with the Flames, Přibyl opted to return home to HC Sparta Praha, agreeing to a one-year contract on May 9, 2018.

== International play ==
He was selected to take part in the 2012 World Junior Ice Hockey Championships for Czech Republic. He contributed with 1 assist in 5 tournament appearances.

== Career statistics ==
=== Regular season and playoffs ===
			Regular season					Playoffs
Season	Team	League	GP	G	A	Pts	PIM	GP	G	A	Pts	PIM
2010–11	HC Sparta Praha	ELH	3	0	0	0	0	—	—	—	—	—
2010–11	HC Berounští Medvědi	Czech.1	1	0	0	0	0	—	—	—	—	—
2011–12	HC Sparta Praha	ELH	17	2	0	2	6	—	—	—	—	—
2011–12	HC Berounští Medvědi	Czech.1	21	9	4	13	4	—	—	—	—	—
2012–13	HC Sparta Praha	ELH	42	12	10	22	10	6	0	0	0	4
2012–13	HC Litoměřice	Czech.1	1	1	0	1	0	—	—	—	—	—
2013–14	HC Sparta Praha	ELH	46	9	16	25	18	12	5	3	8	4
2014–15	HC Sparta Praha	ELH	21	8	7	15	14	10	1	4	5	8
2015–16	HC Sparta Praha	ELH	45	16	29	45	16	9	5	6	11	2
2016–17	Stockton Heat	AHL	33	5	10	15	4	—	—	—	—	—
2021–22	HC Sparta Praha	ELH	6	0	0	0	2	—	—	—	—	—
2021–22	HC Baník Sokolov	Czech.1	14	5	7	12	2	9	1	5	6	2
ELH totals			180	47	62	111	64	41	13	14	27	18

=== International ===
Year	Team	Event	Result	GP	G	A	Pts	PIM
2012	Czech Republic	WJC	5th	5	0	1	1	0
Junior totals				5	0	1	1	0
