= Jiří Marušák =

Czech ice hockey player (born 1975)

- Born: 29 November 1975 (age 50) Zlín, Czechoslovakia
- Height: 6 ft 1 in (185 cm)
- Weight: 194 lb (88 kg; 13 st 12 lb)
- Position: Defence
- Shot: Right
- Played for: HC Zlín; Tappara; Metallurg Novokuznetsk; SKA Saint Petersburg; HC CSKA Moscow; Djurgårdens IF; HC Vítkovice; BK Mladá Boleslav; HC MVD; HC Plzeň; HC Pardubice
- Playing career: 1992–2017

Jiří Marušák (born 29 November 1975) is a Czech former professional ice hockey defenceman.

Marušák played in the Czech Extraliga for HC Zlín, BK Mladá Boleslav, HC Plzeň and HC Pardubice. He also played in the SM-liiga for Tappara, the Elitserien for Djurgårdens IF and in the Russian Superleague and its successor the Kontinental Hockey League for Metallurg Novokuznetsk, SKA Saint Petersburg, HC CSKA Moscow and HC MVD.

== Career statistics ==
			Regular season					Playoffs
Season	Team	League	GP	G	A	Pts	PIM	GP	G	A	Pts	PIM
1991–92	PSG Berani Zlín U18	Czechoslovakia U18	34	16	10	26	—	—	—	—	—	—
1992–93	AC Zlín	Czechoslovakia	2	0	0	0	0	1	0	0	0	—
1993–94	AC Zlín	Czech	—	—	—	—	—	—	—	—	—	—
1994–95	AC Zlín	Czech	1	0	0	0	0	—	—	—	—	—
1995–96	AC Zlín	Czech	15	1	2	3	8	5	1	0	1	6
1995–96	LHK Jestřábi Prostějov	Czech2	21	2	0	2	—	—	—	—	—	—
1996–97	AC Zlín	Czech	31	2	1	3	6	—	—	—	—	—
1996–97	LHK Jestřábi Prostějov	Czech2	1	0	0	0	—	—	—	—	—	—
1997–98	HC Zlín	Czech	50	4	5	9	20	—	—	—	—	—
1998–99	HC Zlín	Czech	48	7	9	16	44	11	3	4	7	4
1999–00	HC Barum Continental	Czech	51	3	18	21	26	4	0	2	2	2
2000–01	HC Zlín	Czech	51	5	19	24	32	6	0	1	1	8
2001–02	HC Zlín	Czech	52	10	24	34	60	11	1	5	6	8
2002–03	HC Hamé	Czech	44	5	19	24	63	—	—	—	—	—
2002–03	Tappara	SM-liiga	12	0	1	1	2	15	3	3	6	14
2003–04	Metallurg Novokuznetsk	Russia	60	8	12	20	50	4	0	3	3	10
2004–05	Metallurg Novokuznetsk	Russia	54	2	12	14	64	4	0	0	0	6
2004–05	Metallurg Novokuznetsk-2	Russia3	1	0	0	0	2	—	—	—	—	—
2005–06	SKA St. Petersburg	Russia	46	3	9	12	36	3	0	0	0	6
2006–07	HC Hamé	Czech	20	3	2	5	24	—	—	—	—	—
2006–07	HC CSKA Moscow	Russia	9	0	2	2	8	—	—	—	—	—
2006–07	Djurgårdens IF	Elitserien	19	4	6	10	14	—	—	—	—	—
2007–08	HC Vítkovice	Czech	13	1	1	2	14	—	—	—	—	—
2007–08	Djurgårdens IF	Elitserien	44	6	10	16	26	5	0	1	1	4
2008–09	BK Mladá Boleslav	Czech	21	2	4	6	30	—	—	—	—	—
2008–09	HK MVD	KHL	30	3	9	12	66	—	—	—	—	—
2009–10	Metallurg Novokuznetsk	KHL	56	2	10	12	68	—	—	—	—	—
2010–11	BK Mladá Boleslav	Czech	52	2	6	8	30	—	—	—	—	—
2011–12	BK Mladá Boleslav	Czech	4	0	0	0	2	—	—	—	—	—
2011–12	HC Plzeň 1929	Czech	46	8	10	18	26	9	0	1	1	6
2012–13	HC Plzeň	Czech	37	0	7	7	52	—	—	—	—	—
2012–13	HC Pardubice	Czech	12	0	2	2	4	4	0	2	2	4
2013–14	HC Zlín	Czech	52	7	14	21	46	17	4	4	8	12
2014–15	HC Zlín	Czech	51	9	16	25	52	7	1	3	4	6
2015–16	HC Zlín	Czech	37	3	12	15	18	10	1	1	2	6
2016–17	HC Zlín	Czech	52	2	13	15	58	—	—	—	—	—
KHL totals			86	5	19	24	134	—	—	—	—	—
Russia totals			169	13	35	48	158	11	0	3	3	22
Czech totals			740	74	184	258	615	84	12	24	36	62
