= Radim Šimek =

Czech ice hockey player (born 1992)

- Šimek with HC Bílí Tygři Liberec in 2026
- Born: September 20, 1992 (age 34) Mladá Boleslav, Czechoslovakia
- Height: 6 ft 0 in (183 cm)
- Weight: 204 lb (93 kg; 14 st 8 lb)
- Position: Defence
- Shoots: Left
- ELH team Former teams: HC Bílí Tygři Liberec; San Jose Sharks
- National team: Czech Republic
- NHL draft: Undrafted
- Playing career: 2011–present

Radim Šimek (born September 20, 1992) is a Czech professional ice hockey player who is a defenceman for HC Bílí Tygři Liberec of the Czech Extraliga (ELH).

== Playing career ==
Šimek made his Extraliga debut playing with Liberec during the 2012–13 season.

In the 2016–17 season, his fifth with Liberec, Šimek led the league amongst defencemen with 11 goals in the regular season. As an undrafted free agent, he agreed to a one-year, two-way contract with the San Jose Sharks of the National Hockey League (NHL) on May 23, 2017. He was re-signed by the Sharks on April 28, 2018.

On October 2, 2018, he was assigned to the San Jose Barracuda. He made his NHL debut on December 2 against the Montreal Canadiens and recorded his first career NHL point in a 5–1 win over the Carolina Hurricanes on December 6.

On December 10, 2018, Šimek recorded his first NHL goal from fellow Czech Lukáš Radil, which would be the game-winner in a 5–2 win over the New Jersey Devils. On March 12, 2019, he suffered an ACL and MCL injury which kept him out for the rest of the 2018–19 season.

On March 9, 2020, Šimek signed a four-year, $9 million contract extension with the Sharks.

On March 8, 2024, Šimek was traded to the Detroit Red Wings, along with a 2024 seventh-round pick, in exchange for Klim Kostin.

On June 14, 2024, Šimek signed a three-year contract to return to Liberec.

== International play ==
Medal record

Representing Czech Republic

World Championships
Bronze medal – third place	2022 Finland	

Šimek represented the Czech Republic at the 2022 IIHF World Championship where he recorded two assists in nine games and won a bronze medal.

== Career statistics ==
=== Regular season and playoffs ===
			Regular season					Playoffs
Season	Team	League	GP	G	A	Pts	PIM	GP	G	A	Pts	PIM
2007–08	HC Benátky nad Jizerou	CZE.2 U18	29	0	4	4	26	—	—	—	—	—
2008–09	HC Benátky nad Jizerou	CZE.2 U18	30	0	13	13	72	4	0	1	1	2
2008–09	HC Benátky nad Jizerou	CZE.3 U20	2	0	1	1	0	—	—	—	—	—
2009–10	HC Benátky nad Jizerou	CZE.2 U18	5	0	2	2	0	—	—	—	—	—
2009–10	HC Benátky nad Jizerou	CZE.2 U20	3	1	0	1	2	—	—	—	—	—
2009–10	Bílí Tygři Liberec	CZE U18	10	1	2	3	6	—	—	—	—	—
2009–10	Bílí Tygři Liberec	CZE U20	19	4	4	8	8	—	—	—	—	—
2010–11	Bílí Tygři Liberec	CZE U20	36	1	9	10	16	—	—	—	—	—
2011–12	Bílí Tygři Liberec	CZE U20	32	6	4	10	14	—	—	—	—	—
2011–12	HC Benátky nad Jizerou	CZE.2	9	0	0	0	8	7	0	0	0	2
2012–13	Bílí Tygři Liberec	ELH	7	0	0	0	2	—	—	—	—	—
2012–13	HC Benátky nad Jizerou	CZE.2	37	0	5	5	41	—	—	—	—	—
2013–14	Bílí Tygři Liberec	ELH	24	0	0	0	4	—	—	—	—	—
2013–14	HC Benátky nad Jizerou	CZE.2	19	1	1	2	20	2	0	0	0	0
2014–15	Bílí Tygři Liberec	ELH	47	10	13	23	24	—	—	—	—	—
2014–15	HC Benátky nad Jizerou	CZE.2	2	1	0	1	0	—	—	—	—	—
2015–16	Bílí Tygři Liberec	ELH	51	9	12	21	28	14	3	7	10	8
2016–17	Bílí Tygři Liberec	ELH	42	11	13	24	30	16	2	6	8	6
2017–18	San Jose Barracuda	AHL	67	7	20	27	20	4	0	0	0	0
2018–19	San Jose Sharks	NHL	41	1	8	9	8	—	—	—	—	—
2019–20	San Jose Barracuda	AHL	2	0	2	2	0	—	—	—	—	—
2019–20	San Jose Sharks	NHL	48	2	7	9	14	—	—	—	—	—
2020–21	San Jose Sharks	NHL	40	2	4	6	15	—	—	—	—	—
2021–22	San Jose Sharks	NHL	36	1	1	2	8	—	—	—	—	—
2022–23	San Jose Sharks	NHL	44	1	2	3	29	—	—	—	—	—
2023–24	San Jose Barracuda	AHL	40	4	12	16	29	—	—	—	—	—
2023–24	Grand Rapids Griffins	AHL	9	0	1	1	0	8	0	2	2	4
2024–25	Bílí Tygři Liberec	ELH	34	8	14	22	33	5	0	0	0	10
2025–26	Bílí Tygři Liberec	ELH	47	5	9	14	6	6	1	3	4	0
ELH totals			252	43	61	104	127	41	6	16	22	24
NHL totals			209	7	22	29	74	—	—	—	—	—

=== International ===
Year	Team	Event	Result	GP	G	A	Pts	PIM
2016	Czech Republic	WC	5th	8	1	0	1	4
2017	Czech Republic	WC	7th	8	1	1	2	0
2022	Czechia	WC	3rd place, bronze medalist(s)	9	0	2	2	2
2026	Czechia	OG	8th	5	1	0	1	0
Senior totals				30	3	3	6	6

== Awards and honours ==
Award	Year
ELH
Champion	2016
Playoffs MVP	2016
