= Petr Vampola =

Czech professional ice hockey centre (born 1982)

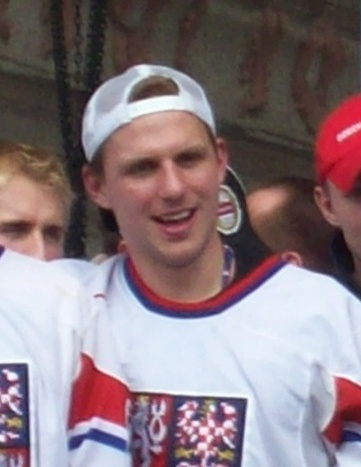
- Born: January 21, 1982 (age 43) Žďár nad Sázavou, Czechoslovakia
- Height: 6 ft 1 in (185 cm)
- Weight: 200 lb (91 kg; 14 st 4 lb)
- Position: Centre
- Shoots: Left
- SEL team Former teams: Växjö Lakers; CEL; VHK Vsetín; HC Liberec; HC Plzeň 1929; KHL; Salavat Yulaev Ufa; Traktor Chelyabinsk; Avangard Omsk; NLA; Genève-Servette HC; SEL; Timrå IK
- National team: Czech Republic
- Playing career: 2000–present

Petr Vampola
Medal record

Representing Czech Republic

World Championships
Gold medal – first place	2010 Cologne	Ice hockey
Bronze medal – third place	2011 Bratislava	Ice hockey

Petr Vampola (born January 21, 1982) is a Czech professional ice hockey centre who currently plays for the Hc Vsetín of the Chance liga.

== International career ==
Vampola competed at the 2010 Men's World Ice Hockey Championships as a member of the Czech Republic men's national ice hockey team, where he won a gold medal.

== Career statistics ==
=== Regular season and playoffs ===
			Regular season					Playoffs
Season	Team	League	GP	G	A	Pts	PIM	GP	G	A	Pts	PIM
1999–2000	HC Slovnaft Vsetín	CZE U20	32	7	12	19	20	7	2	4	6	10
2000–01	HC Slovnaft Vsetín	CZE U20	34	14	19	33	165	8	5	4	9	26
2000–01	HC Slovnaft Vsetín	ELH	12	0	4	4	14	—	—	—	—	—
2000–01	HC Šumperk	CZE.2	2	0	3	3	2	—	—	—	—	—
2001–02	HC Vsetín	CZE U20	15	9	13	22	93	2	0	0	0	6
2001–02	HC Vsetín	ELH	46	4	9	13	56	—	—	—	—	—
2002–03	HC Vsetín	CZE U20	6	4	9	13	56	—	—	—	—	—
2002–03	HC Vsetín	ELH	48	7	14	21	48	4	0	0	0	2
2002–03	HC Vagnerplast Kladno	CZE.2	—	—	—	—	—	3	0	2	2	8
2003–04	Vsetínská hokejová	ELH	14	1	5	6	22	—	—	—	—	—
2003–04	Bílí Tygři Liberec	ELH	24	2	12	14	44	—	—	—	—	—
2004–05	Bílí Tygři Liberec	ELH	27	2	3	5	14	—	—	—	—	—
2004–05	HC České Budějovice	CZE.2	14	3	4	7	12	8	0	0	0	4
2005–06	HC Bílí Tygři Liberec	ELH	46	8	28	36	48	4	0	0	0	8
2006–07	HC Bílí Tygři Liberec	ELH	19	0	4	4	28	—	—	—	—	—
2006–07	HC Lasselsberger Plzeň	ELH	26	5	9	14	28	—	—	—	—	—
2007–08	HC Lasselsberger Plzeň	ELH	52	15	20	35	72	4	2	1	3	28
2008–09	HC Lasselsberger Plzeň	ELH	26	13	16	29	72	—	—	—	—	—
2008–09	Salavat Yulaev Ufa	KHL	17	1	2	3	10	—	—	—	—	—
2009–10	HC Plzeň 1929	ELH	48	15	37	52	86	6	3	2	5	10
2010–11	Traktor Chelyabinsk	KHL	36	6	8	14	30	—	—	—	—	—
2010–11	Avangard Omsk	KHL	13	2	5	7	28	12	0	2	2	8
2011–12	Timrå IK	SEL	20	6	11	17	40	—	—	—	—	—
2011–12	Genève–Servette HC	NLA	23	3	13	16	26	—	—	—	—	—
2012–13	Växjö Lakers	SEL	42	4	17	21	30	—	—	—	—	—
2012–13	HC Škoda Plzeň	ELH	8	1	4	5	18	19	0	6	6	30
2013–14	HC Bílí Tygři Liberec	ELH	48	12	18	30	147	3	0	0	0	4
2014–15	HC Bílí Tygři Liberec	ELH	51	14	19	33	76	—	—	—	—	—
2015–16	HC Bílí Tygři Liberec	ELH	52	14	31	45	64	12	5	7	12	75
2016–17	BK Mladá Boleslav	ELH	46	9	14	23	48	5	1	1	2	2
ELH totals			593	122	247	369	885	57	11	17	28	159

=== International ===
Year	Team	Event	GP	G	A	Pts	PIM
2000	Czech Republic	WJC18	6	0	0	0	4
2010	Czech Republic	WC	9	0	2	2	4
2011	Czech Republic	WC	3	0	0	0	0
Senior totals			12	0	2	2	4
