= Jaroslav Kudrna =

Czech professional ice hockey player (born 1975)

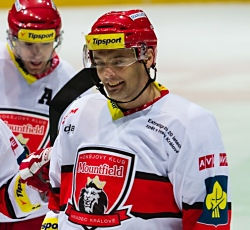
- Born: 5 December 1975 (age 50) Hradec Králové, Czechoslovakia
- Height: 6 ft 0 in (183 cm)
- Weight: 185 lb (84 kg; 13 st 3 lb)
- Position: Left wing
- Shot: Left
- Played for: Mountfield HK; HC Pardubice; HC Plzeň; HC Oceláři Třinec; Metallurg Magnitogorsk; HC Bílí Tygři Liberec
- NHL draft: 142nd overall, 1995; San Jose Sharks
- Playing career: 1995–2016

Jaroslav Kudrna (born 5 December 1975) is a Czech former professional ice hockey player.

Kudrna was drafted 142nd overall by the San Jose Sharks in the 1995 NHL entry draft. Kudrna signed for the Sharks organization from HC Pardubice in 1996, but only managed to play seven games for the American Hockey League's Kentucky Thoroughblades before returning to Pardubice where he would spend the next seven seasons. In 2004, Kudrna moved to HC Lasselsberger Plzeň for one season before moving to HC Oceláři Třinec. In 2006, he moved to Russia and signed for Metallurg Magnitogorsk.

== Career statistics ==
=== Regular season and playoffs ===
			Regular season					Playoffs
Season	Team	League	GP	G	A	Pts	PIM	GP	G	A	Pts	PIM
1991–92	TJ Stadion Hradec Králové	TCH U18	36	49	64	113	—	—	—	—	—	—
1992–93	HC Stadion Hradec Králové	TCH U18	38	18	16	34	—	—	—	—	—	—
1993–94	HC Stadion Hradec Králové	CZE U20	5	3	1	4	—	—	—	—	—	—
1993–94	HC Stadion Hradec Králové	ELH	5	0	0	0	0	—	—	—	—	—
1994–95	Penticton Panthers	BCHL	58	60	55	115	148	—	—	—	—	—
1994–95	HC Lev Hradec Králové	CZE.2	—	—	—	—	—	—	—	—	—	—
1995–96	HC Pojišťovna IB Pardubice	ELH	38	14	16	30	93	—	—	—	—	—
1996–97	Kentucky Thoroughblades	AHL	7	0	0	0	4	—	—	—	—	—
1996–97	HC Pojišťovna IB Pardubice	ELH	24	9	7	16	20	9	4	3	7	22
1997–98	HC IPB Pojišťovna Pardubice	ELH	48	23	17	40	99	3	2	0	2	2
1998–99	HC IPB Pojišťovna Pardubice	ELH	52	24	20	44	120	3	0	0	0	16
1999–2000	HC IPB Pojišťovna Pardubice	ELH	51	18	11	29	124	3	0	1	1	6
2000–01	HC IPB Pojišťovna Pardubice	ELH	49	20	13	33	84	7	3	2	5	22
2001–02	HC IPB Pojišťovna Pardubice	ELH	48	16	22	38	86	6	2	1	3	8
2002–03	HC ČSOB Pojišťovna Pardubice	ELH	37	12	5	17	58	19	3	6	9	30
2002–03	HC VČE Hradec Králové	CZE.2	3	1	0	1	4	—	—	—	—	—
2003–04	HC Moeller Pardubice	ELH	51	15	16	31	92	6	3	1	4	4
2004–05	HC Lasselsberger Plzeň	ELH	32	6	6	12	54	—	—	—	—	—
2004–05	HC VČE Hradec Králové	CZE.2	4	0	0	0	20	—	—	—	—	—
2005–06	HC Oceláři Třinec	ELH	49	22	22	44	108	4	1	3	4	6
2006–07	HC Oceláři Třinec	ELH	21	9	7	16	20	—	—	—	—	—
2006–07	Metallurg Magnitogorsk	RSL	31	5	13	18	38	15	5	4	9	34
2007–08	Metallurg Magnitogorsk	RSL	48	21	11	32	52	—	—	—	—	—
2008–09	Metallurg Magnitogorsk	KHL	55	18	18	36	78	12	3	2	5	26
2009–10	Metallurg Magnitogorsk	KHL	45	9	7	16	42	10	0	3	3	8
2010–11	Bílí Tygři Liberec	ELH	51	18	19	37	67	7	1	2	3	14
2011–12	Bílí Tygři Liberec	ELH	46	15	17	32	74	9	5	0	5	16
2012–13	Bílí Tygři Liberec	ELH	25	5	7	12	35	—	—	—	—	—
2013–14	Mountfield HK	ELH	31	15	19	34	34	6	3	1	4	4
2014–15	Mountfield HK	ELH	37	13	21	34	34	4	3	1	4	8
2015–16	Mountfield HK	ELH	43	12	10	22	38	6	2	1	3	12
ELH totals			738	266	255	521	1240	92	32	22	54	170

=== International ===
Year	Team	Event	GP	G	A	Pts	PIM
1995	Czech Republic	WJC	7	4	4	8	6
Junior totals			7	4	4	8	6
