= Lukáš Pulpán =

Czech ice hockey player

- Born: June 23, 1985 (age 40) Plzeň, Czechoslovakia
- Height: 5 ft 9 in (175 cm)
- Weight: 179 lb (81 kg; 12 st 11 lb)
- Position: Defence
- Shoots: Left
- Czech2 team Former teams: Piráti Chomutov; HC Plzeň (Czech)
- NHL draft: Undrafted
- Playing career: 2004–present

Lukáš Pulpán (born June 23, 1985) is a Czech professional ice hockey defenceman. He played three seasons (2004–07) with HC Plzeň in the Czech Extraliga.

== Awards and honours ==
Award	Year
IIHF World U18 Championships First Team All-Star	2003
