= Pavel Musil =

Czech ice hockey player

- Born: 30 August 1992 (age 32); Čáslav, Czechoslovakia
- Height: 5 ft 11 in (180 cm)
- Weight: 172 lb (78 kg; 12 st 4 lb)
- Position: Forward
- Shoots: Left
- Czech Extraliga team: HC Škoda Plzeň
- NHL draft: Undrafted
- Playing career: 2010–present

Pavel Musil (born 30 August 1992) is a Czech professional ice hockey player. He currently plays for HC Škoda Plzeň in the Czech Extraliga.

Musil made his Czech Extraliga debut playing with HC Pardubice during the 2013–14 Czech Extraliga season.
