= Rastislav Dej =

Slovak professional ice hockey player

- Born: September 12, 1988 (age 38) Považská Bystrica, Czechoslovakia
- Height: 5 ft 10 in (178 cm)
- Weight: 190 lb (86 kg; 13 st 8 lb)
- Position: Forward
- Shoots: Left
- ELH team Former teams: HC Vítkovice; HC Karlovy Vary; Motor České Budějovice; Mountfield HK
- Playing career: 2007–present

Rastislav Dej (born September 12, 1988) is a Slovak professional ice hockey player who played for HC Vítkovice Ridera in the Czech Extraliga (ELH).

Dej has previously played in the Extraliga for HC Karlovy Vary, Motor České Budějovice and Mountfield HK.
