= Martin Vyrůbalík =

Czech ice hockey player

- Born: January 29, 1981 (age 44); Hodonín, Czechoslovakia
- Height: 6 ft 0 in (183 cm)
- Weight: 196 lb (89 kg; 14 st 0 lb)
- Position: Defence
- Shoots: Left
- Czech Extraliga team Former teams: HC Olomouc; HK 36 Skalica; HC Vsetín; HC Znojemští Orli; HC Kometa Brno
- NHL draft: Undrafted
- Playing career: 2001–present

Martin Vyrůbalík (born January 29, 1981) is a Czech professional ice hockey defenceman who currently plays with HC Olomouc in the Czech Extraliga.
