= Jiří Šimánek (ice hockey) =

Czech ice hockey player

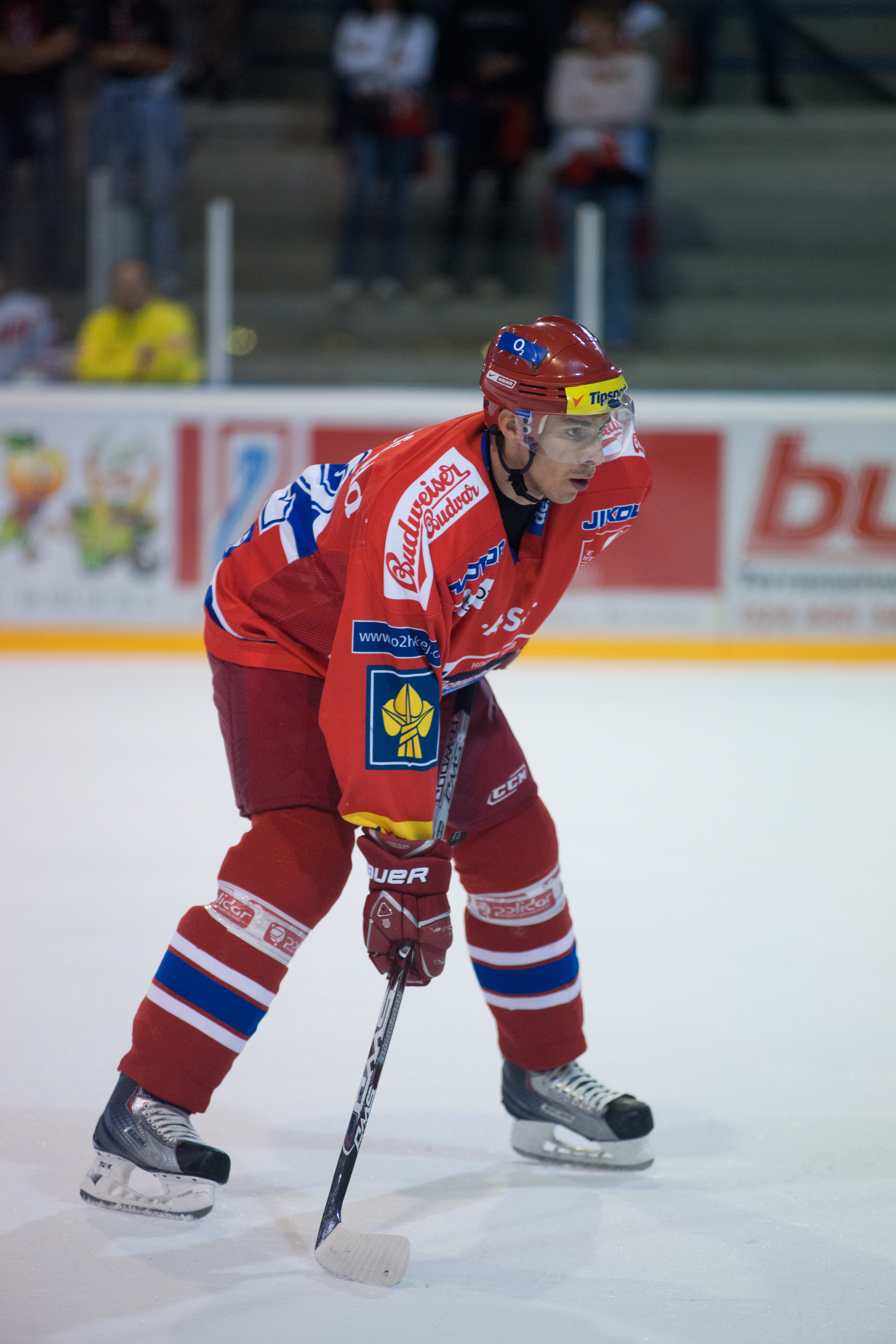
- Šimánek with HC Mountfield in 2010
- Born: October 6, 1978 (age 47) České Budějovice, Czechoslovakia
- Height: 6 ft 1 in (185 cm)
- Weight: 183 lb (83 kg; 13 st 1 lb)
- Position: Forward
- Shot: Right
- Played for: HC České Budějovice; VHK Vsetín; Mountfield HK; Bílí Tygři Liberec
- National team: Czech Republic
- NHL draft: Undrafted
- Playing career: 1997–2020

Jiří Šimánek (born October 6, 1978) is a Czech former professional ice hockey player. He played 21 seasons in the Czech Extraliga with HC České Budějovice, VHK Vsetín, Mountfield HK, and Bílí Tygři Liberec.

Šimánek previously played for IHC Písek and HC Bílí Tygři Liberec.
