= Rudolf Červený =

Czech ice hockey player (born 1989)

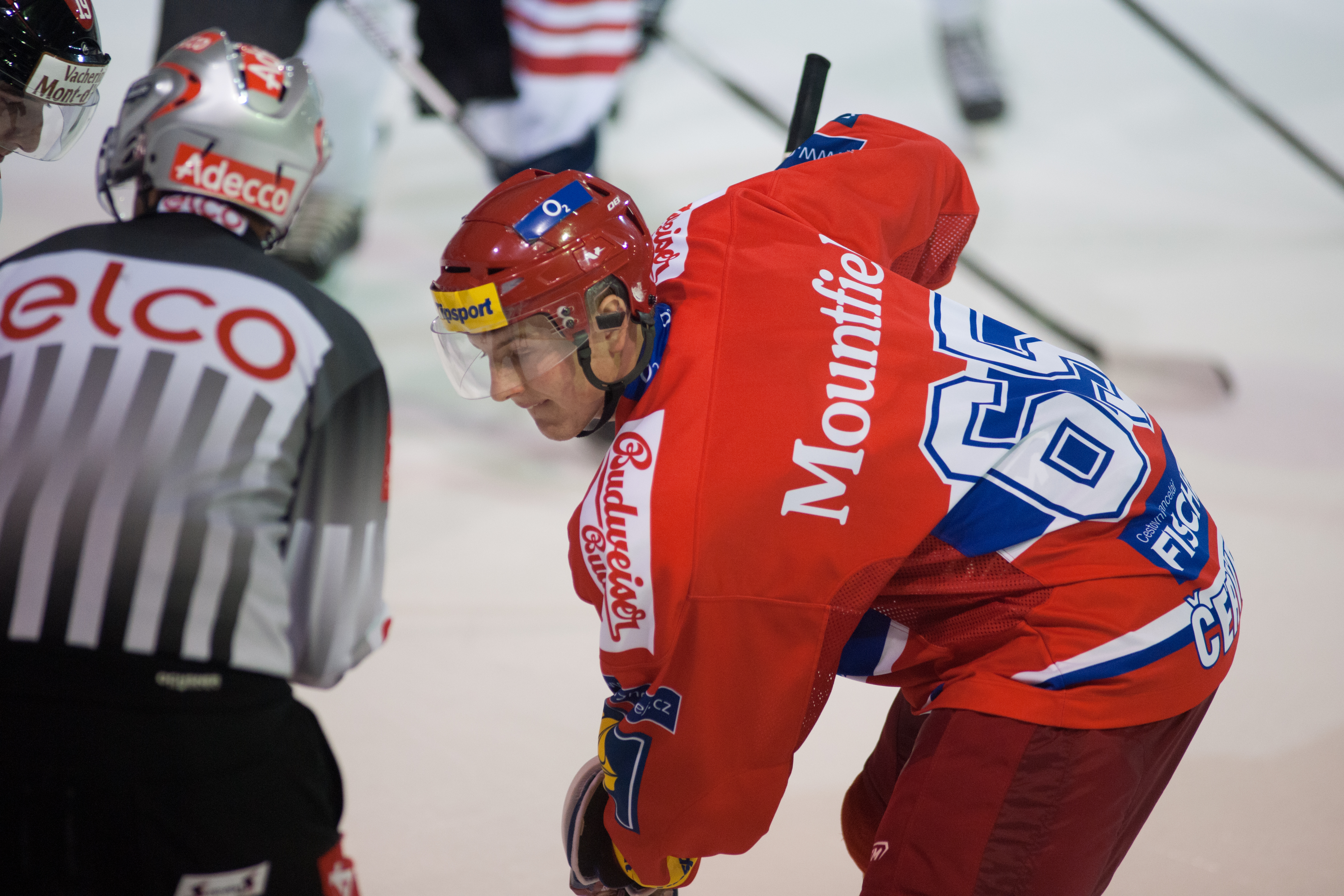
- Born: 6 August 1989 (age 37) České Budějovice, Czechoslovakia
- Height: 6 ft 0 in (183 cm)
- Weight: 187 lb (85 kg; 13 st 5 lb)
- Position: Forward
- Shoots: Left
- Maxa liga team Former teams: HC Tábor; HC České Budějovice; Mountfield HK; HC Slovan Bratislava; Brynäs IF; HC Kometa Brno; Lahti Pelicans; Dinamo Riga; Oulun Kärpät; Admiral Vladivostok; Barys Astana; HK Olimpija
- NHL draft: Undrafted
- Playing career: 2007–present

Rudolf Červený (born 6 August 1989) is a Czech professional ice hockey player who currently plays for HC Tábor of the Maxa liga.

== Playing career ==
He made his professional debut playing with hometown club, HC České Budějovice in the Czech Extraliga during the 2006–07 Czech Extraliga season.

Červený then played two North American major junior season for Regina Pats of the Western Hockey League, before returning to his native Czech Republic undrafted, and returning to České Budějovice and playing on loan with HC Tábor and IHC Písek.

After 5 seasons with Mountfield HK, Červený paused his Extraliga career, opting to sign a one-year contract with the Slovak club HC Slovan Bratislava of the Kontinental Hockey League (KHL) on May 31, 2018. In the 2018–19 season, Červený was used in a top-line role, placing second on the team in scoring with 23 points in 57 games. With Slovan failing to make the post-season, Červený left to the complete the season with Swedish playoff bound, Brynäs IF of the Swedish Hockey League (SHL), on February 14, 2019.

After a solitary season in the Finnish Liiga with the Lahti Pelicans in 2020–21, Červený returned to the KHL in signing a one-year contract with Latvian-based club, Dinamo Riga, on 31 May 2021.

Červený registered 7 goals and 12 points through 32 regular season games in the 2021–22 season for Dinamo Riga, finishing out of playoff contention. Červený extended his season by returning to the Finnish Liiga, in signing with Oulun Kärpät on 1 March 2022.

Returning to the KHL for the 2022–23 season, Červený was signed to a one-year contract in joining Admiral Vladivostok on 27 July 2022. In his lone season with the club, he posted a new career best in the KHL with 13 goals for 20 points through 60 regular season games. He added a further 3 assists in 12 post-season appearances to help Admiral advance to the Conference semi-finals for the first time in franchise history.

As a free agent leading into the 2023–24 season, Červený continued in the KHL belatedly signing a one-year contract with Kazakh-based club, Barys Astana, on 19 September 2023.
