= Branislav Konrád =

Slovak ice hockey player

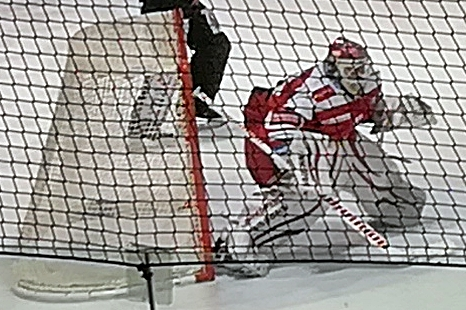
- Konrád in 2017
- Born: 10 October 1987 (age 38) Nitra, Czechoslovakia
- Height: 6 ft 2 in (188 cm)
- Weight: 187 lb (85 kg; 13 st 5 lb)
- Position: Goaltender
- Catches: Left
- Czech team Former teams: HC Olomouc; HK Nitra; Metallurg Zhlobin; HC Slovan Bratislava; HC Oceláři Třinec; HC Dukla Trenčín
- National team: Slovakia
- NHL draft: Undrafted
- Playing career: 2005–present

Branislav Konrád (born 10 October 1987) is a Slovak professional ice hockey goaltender for HC Olomouc of the Czech Extraliga and Slovakia. He previously played for HC Dukla Trenčín and HK Nitra in the Slovak Extraliga, and Metallurg Zhlobin in the Belarusian Extraleague.

Medal record

Representing Slovakia

Ice hockey

Olympic Games
Bronze medal – third place	2022 Beijing	

== Awards and honors ==
Award	Year
Slovak
Champion	2012
