= Marek Račuk =

Czech ice hockey player

- Born: 2 June 1992 (age 34) Teplice, Czechoslovakia
- Height: 6 ft 4 in (193 cm)
- Weight: 223 lb (101 kg; 15 st 13 lb)
- Position: Centre
- Shoots: Left
- Czech.1 team Former teams: LHK Jestřábi Prostějov; Piráti Chomutov; Orli Znojmo; Rytíři Kladno
- Playing career: 2012–present

Marek Račuk (born 2 June 1992) is a Czech professional ice hockey player. He currently plays with LHK Jestřábi Prostějov in the Czech 1. Liga.

Račuk made his Czech Extraliga debut playing with Piráti Chomutov during the 2012–13 Czech Extraliga season.
