= Antonín Pechanec =

Czech ice hockey player

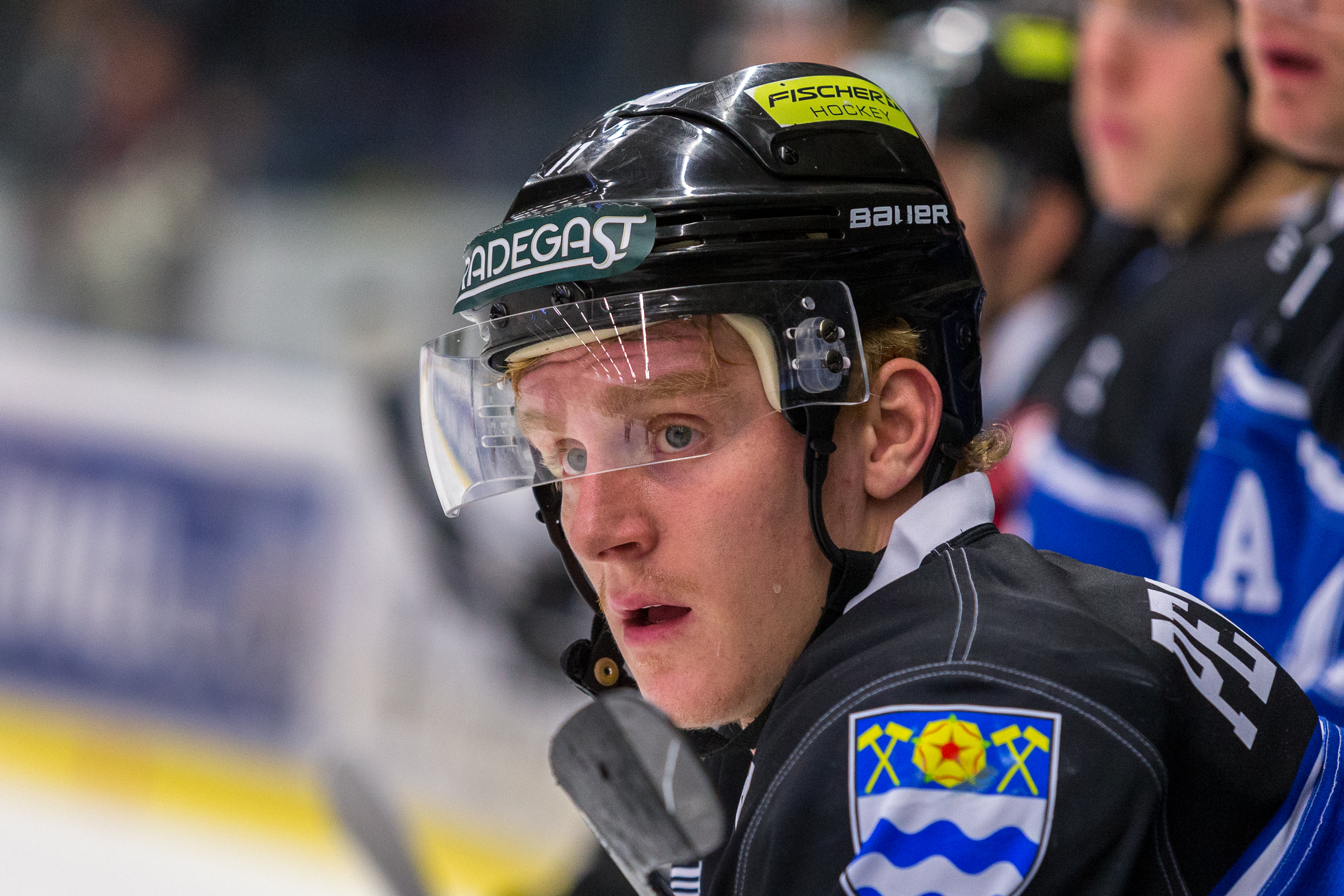
- Born: March 19, 1991 (age 34); Havířov, Czech Republic
- Height: 5 ft 9 in (175 cm)
- Weight: 154 lb (70 kg; 11 st 0 lb)
- Position: Forward
- Shoots: Right
- Czech2 team: AZ Havířov
- NHL draft: Undrafted
- Playing career: 2010–present

Antonín Pechanec (born March 19, 1991) is a Czech professional ice hockey player. He is currently playing with AZ Havířov of the 1st Czech Republic Hockey League.

Pechanec made his Czech Extraliga debut playing with HC Oceláři Třinec during the 2014–15 Czech Extraliga season.
