= Libor Kašík =

Czech ice hockey player (born 1992)

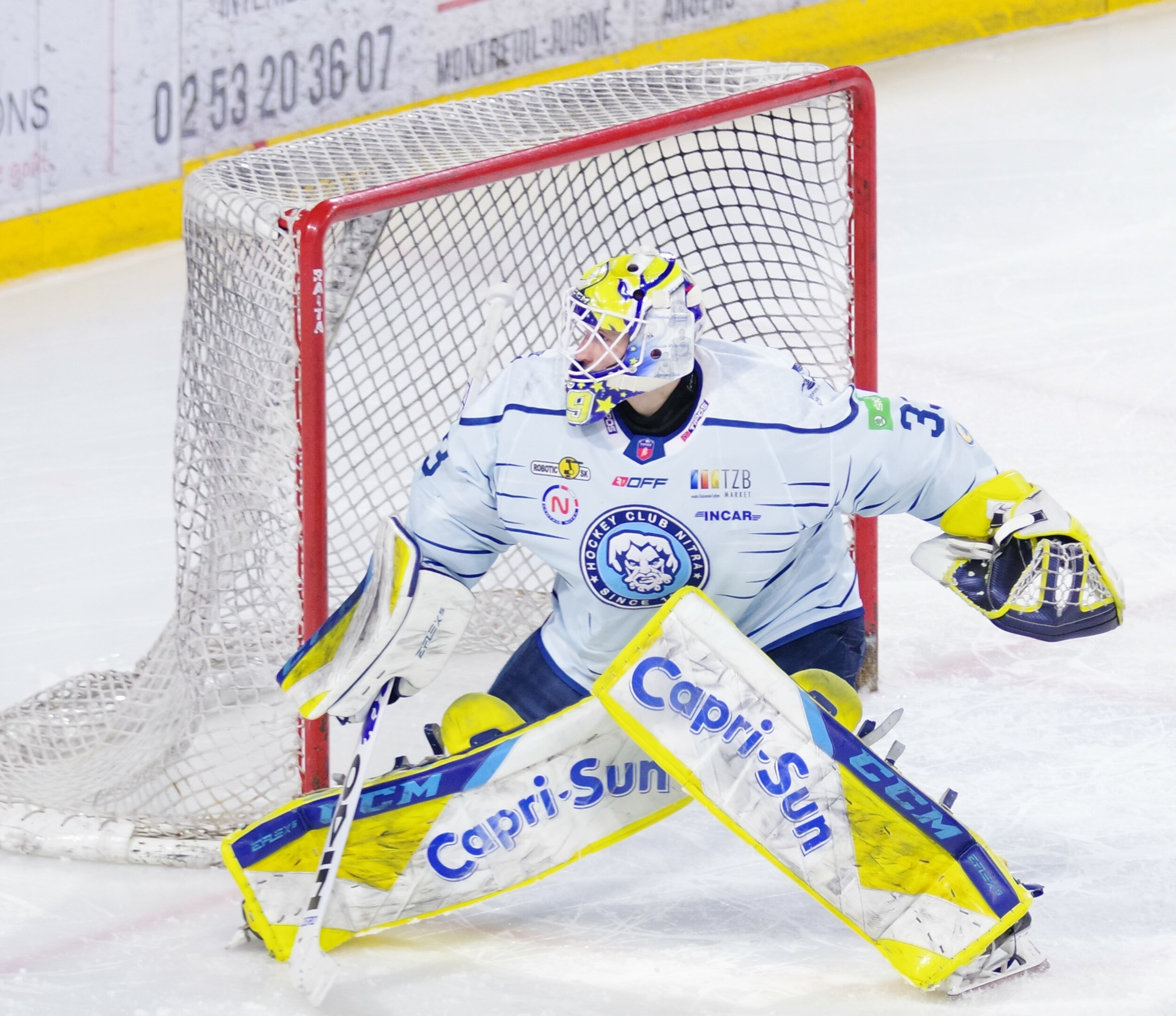
- Libor Kašík (2023)
- Born: 31 March 1992 (age 33); Zlín, Czechoslovakia
- Height: 5 ft 10 in (178 cm)
- Weight: 176 lb (80 kg; 12 st 8 lb)
- Position: Goaltender
- Catches: Right
- Ligue Magnus team Former teams: Marseille Hockey Club; PSG Berani Zlín; Amur Khabarovsk; HC Kometa Brno; Oulun Kärpät; HK Nitra
- National team: Czech Republic
- Playing career: 2011–present

Libor Kašík (born 31 March 1992) is a Czech professional ice hockey goaltender who currently playing for Marseille Hockey Club in the Ligue Magnus.

== Career ==
He is a champion of 2013–14 Czech Extraliga with HC Zlín.
