= Miroslav Forman =

Czech professional ice hockey player

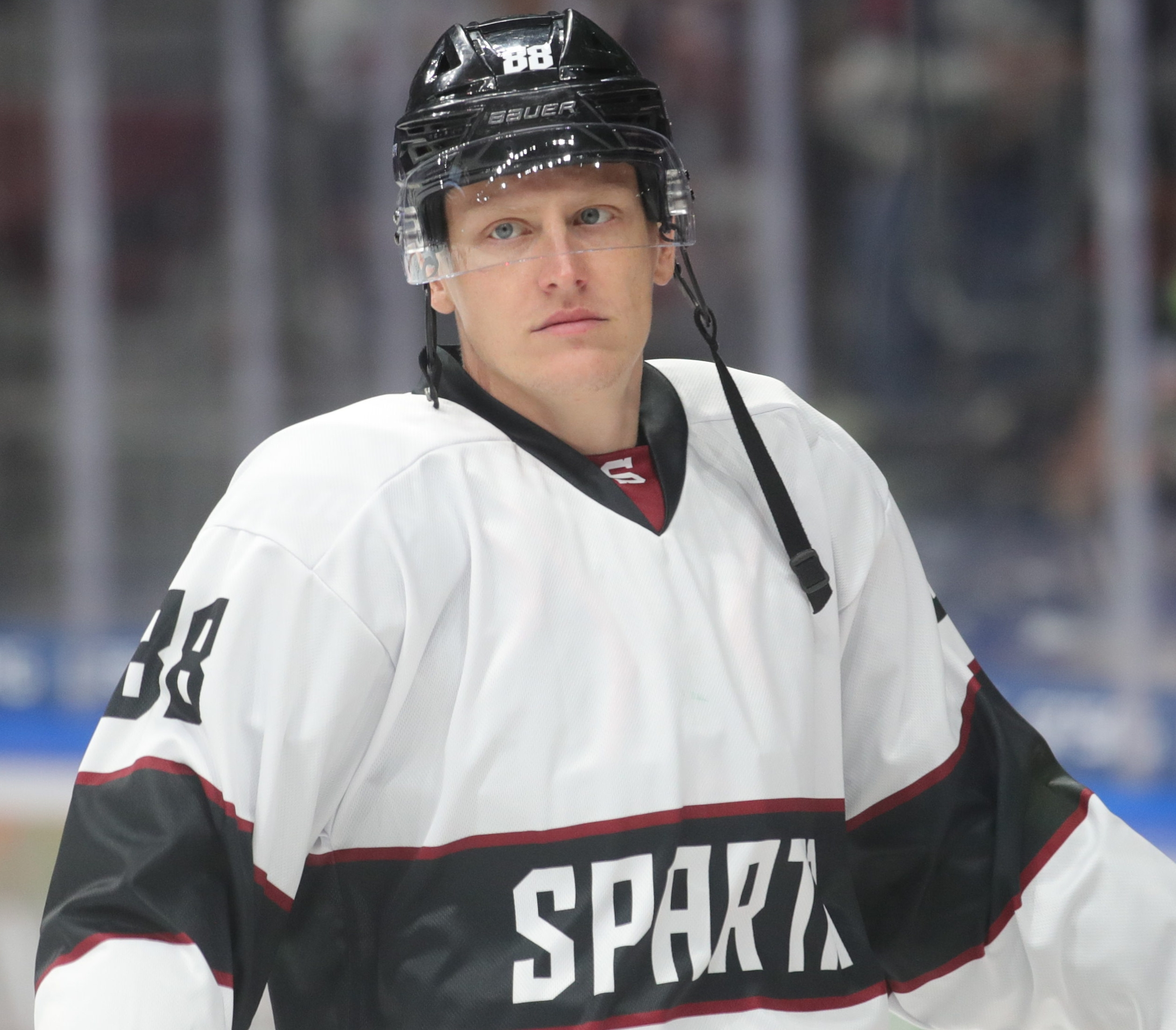
- Forman in 2023
- Born: August 12, 1990 (age 34)
- Height: 6 ft 1 in (185 cm)
- Weight: 192 lb (87 kg; 13 st 10 lb)
- Position: Forward
- Shoots: Left
- Czech Extraliga team: HC Sparta Praha
- Playing career: 2011–present

Miroslav Forman (born August 15, 1990) is a Czech professional ice hockey player. He played with HC Sparta Praha in the Czech Extraliga during the 2010–11 Czech Extraliga season.
