= Miroslav Holec =

Czech ice hockey player

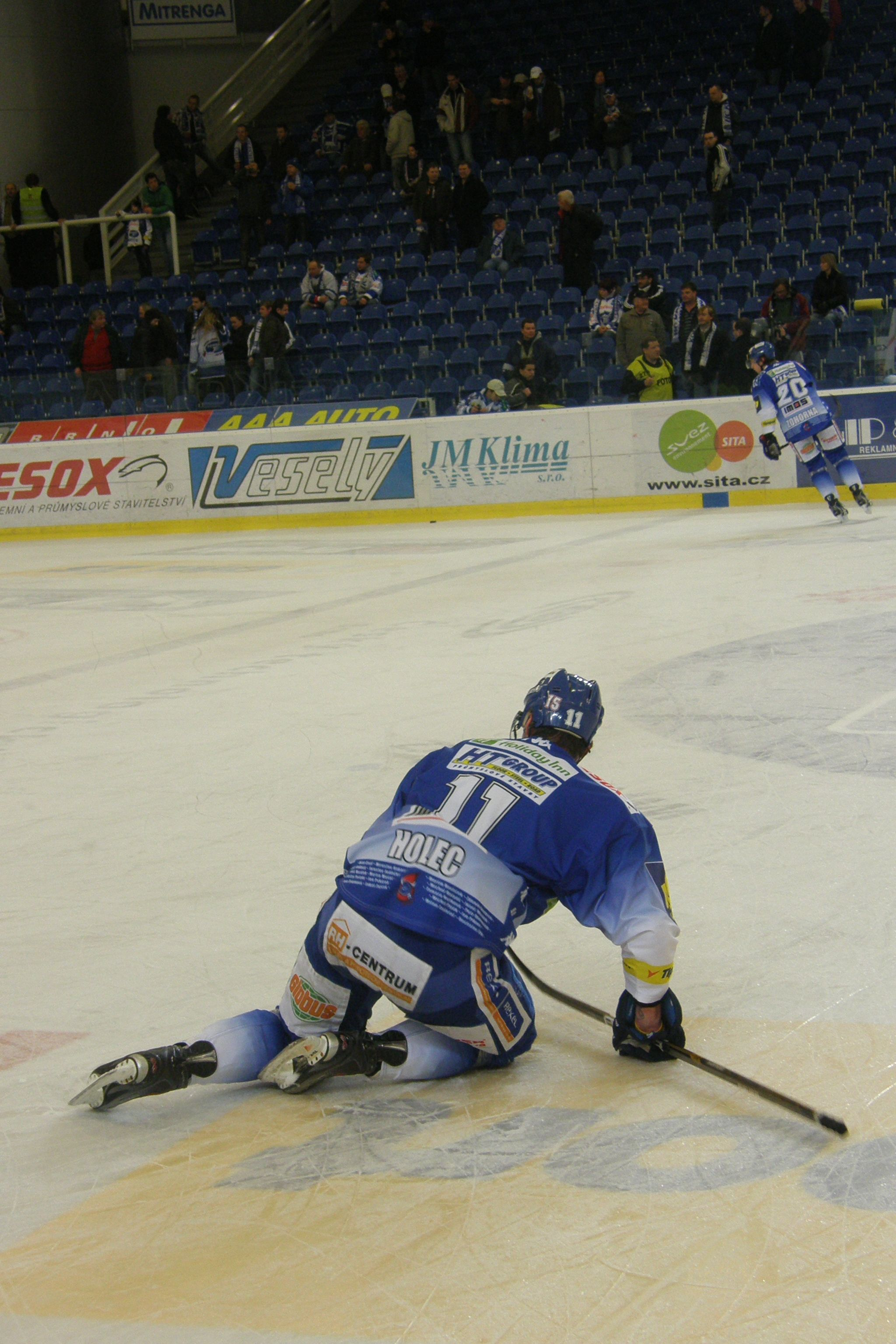
- Born: November 8, 1987 (age 37); Písek, Czech Republic
- Height: 6 ft 0 in (183 cm)
- Weight: 190 lb (86 kg; 13 st 8 lb)
- Position: Forward
- Shoots: Left
- Extraliga team Former teams: Motor České Budějovice; HC Slavia Praha; HC Kometa Brno; HC Plzeň; HC Olomouc
- Playing career: 2005–present

Miroslav Holec (born November 8, 1987) is a Czech professional ice hockey forward who currently plays for Motor České Budějovice of the Czech Extraliga.

Holec has previously played for HC Slavia Praha, HC Kometa Brno, HC Plzeň and HC Olomouc.
