= Jakub Lev =

Czech ice hockey player

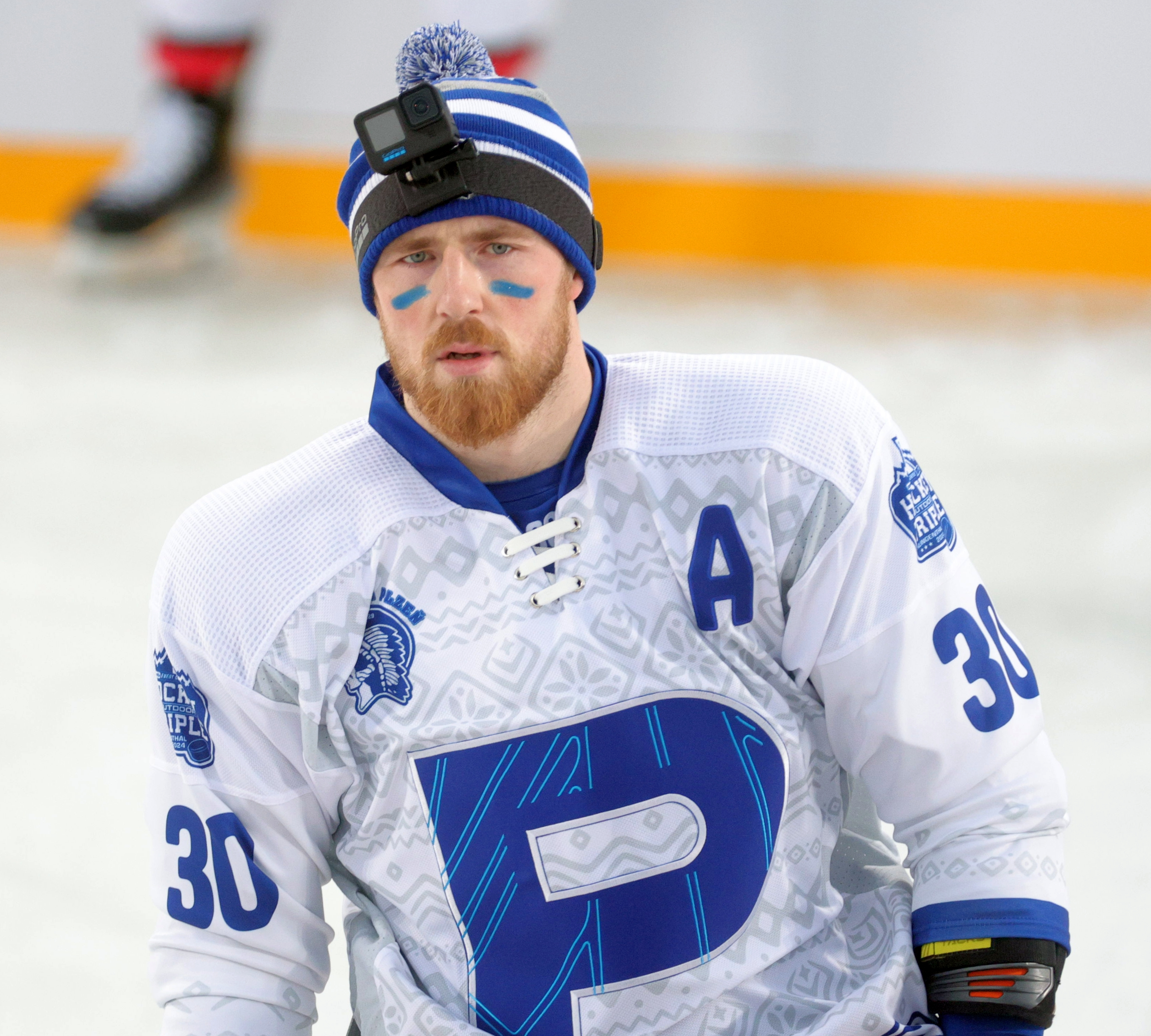
- Lev in 2024
- Born: December 6, 1990 (age 34)
- Height: 6 ft 0 in (183 cm)
- Weight: 198 lb (90 kg; 14 st 2 lb)
- Position: Forward
- Shoots: Left
- Czech Extraliga team: HC Plzeň
- Playing career: 2009–present

Jakub Lev (born December 6, 1990) is a Czech professional ice hockey player. He played with HC Plzeň in the Czech Extraliga during the 2010–11 Czech Extraliga season.
