= Marek Čiliak =

Slovak ice hockey player (born 1990)

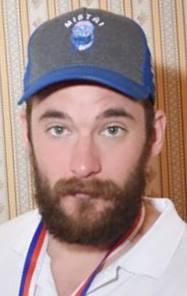
- Born: 2 April 1990 (age 35); Zvolen, Czechoslovakia
- Height: 6 ft 0 in (183 cm)
- Weight: 187 lb (85 kg; 13 st 5 lb)
- Position: Goaltender
- Catches: Left
- Ligue Magnus team Former teams: Spartiates de Marseille; HC Šumperk; HK Orange 20; HC Dukla Senica; HK Nitra; Orli Znojmo; SK Horácká Slavia Třebíč; HC Kometa Brno; HC Slovan Bratislava; PSG Berani Zlín; Motor České Budějovice; HK Poprad
- National team: Slovakia
- Playing career: 2010–present

Marek Čiliak (born 2 April 1990) is a Slovak professional ice hockey goaltender who currently playing for Spartiates de Marseille of the Ligue Magnus.

== Playing career ==
Čiliak made his Czech Extraliga debut playing for Kometa Brno during the 2012–13 Czech Extraliga season.

In his second stint with Brno, Čiliak appeared in 6 seasons before leaving following the 2017–18 season, opting to sign a one-year contract in the Kontinental Hockey League (KHL) with Slovak club, HC Slovan Bratislava, on 30 May 2018.

In the 2018–19 season, Čiliak was given starting goaltender duties, collecting just 6 wins through 28 games for Bratislava. With the club out of playoff contention, on 31 January 2019, he terminated his contract and returned for a third stint with Kometa Brno for the remainder of the season. After 8 games with Brno, prior to the commencement of the post-season, Čiliak was signed to a two-year contract extension to remain with Brno on 11 March 2019.
