= Michal Dragoun =

Czech professional ice hockey player

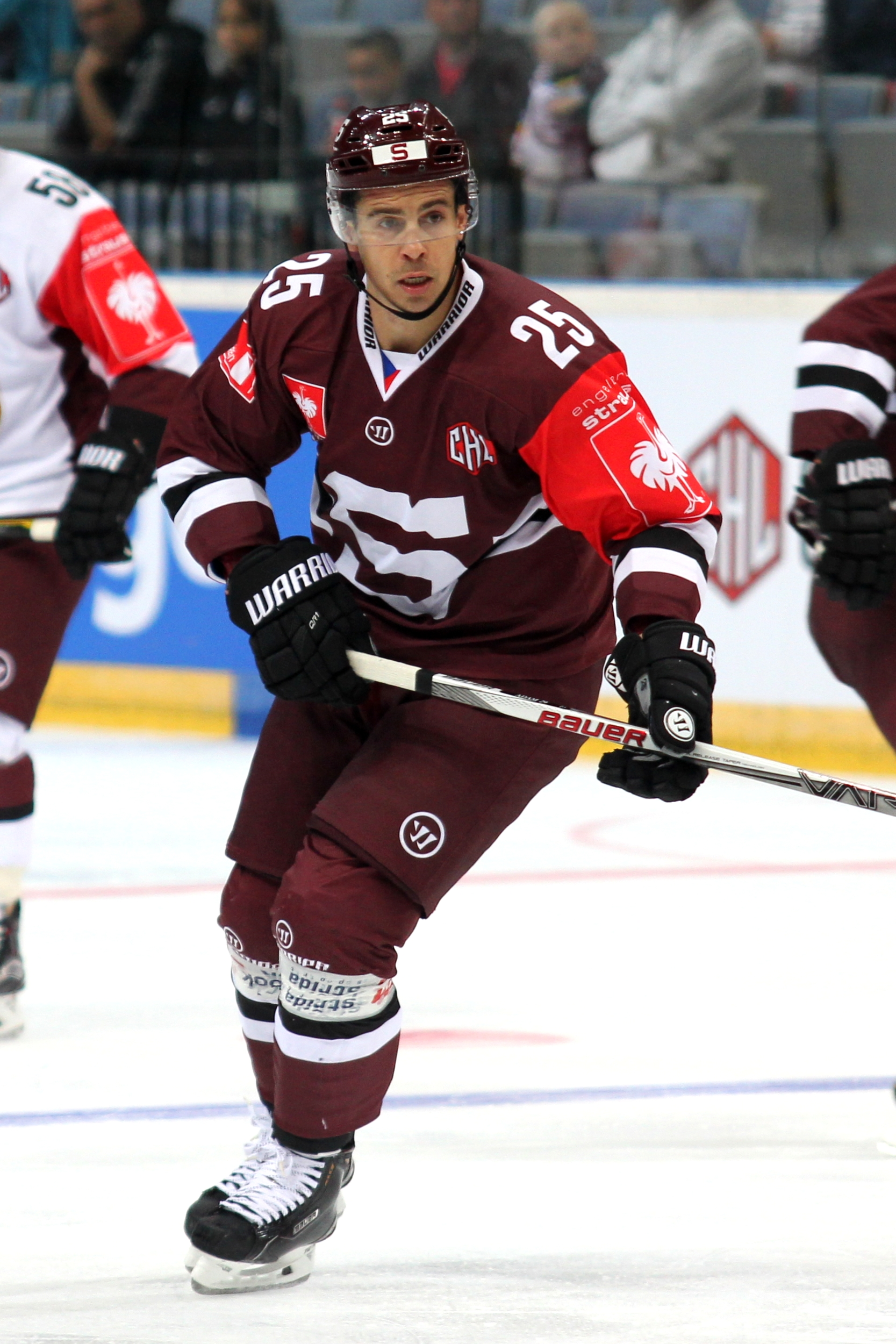
- Born: April 12, 1983 (age 42) Prague, Czechoslovakia
- Height: 6 ft 0 in (183 cm)
- Weight: 187 lb (85 kg; 13 st 5 lb)
- Position: Forward
- Shoots: Left
- Czech Extraliga team Former teams: Mountfield HK; HC Sparta Praha; Motor České Budějovice; HC Litvínov; HC Kladno
- Playing career: 2002–present

Michal Dragoun (born April 12, 1983) is a Czech professional ice hockey player currently playing for Mountfield HK of the Czech Extraliga.

Dragoun previously played with HC Sparta Praha, Motor České Budějovice, HC Litvínov and HC Kladno.
