= Richard Jarůšek =

Czech ice hockey player

- Born: August 8, 1991 (age 35) Brno, Czechoslovakia
- Height: 6 ft 2 in (188 cm)
- Weight: 196 lb (89 kg; 14 st 0 lb)
- Position: Forward
- Shoots: Left
- EIHL team Former teams: Glasgow Clan; Orli Znojmo; BK Mladá Boleslav; HK Hradec Kralove; HC Sparta Praha; HC Litvinov; HC Vitkovice; Pioneers Vorarlberg; Rytíři Kladno
- National team: Czech Republic
- NHL draft: Undrafted
- Playing career: 2014–present

Richard Jarůšek (born August 8, 1991) is a Czech professional ice hockey player. He is currently playing for the UK Elite Ice Hockey League (EIHL) side Glasgow Clan. He was most recently signed to Rytíři Kladno of the Czech Extraliga.

Jarůšek made his Czech Extraliga debut playing with BK Mladá Boleslav during the 2014-15 Czech Extraliga season. Jarůšek competed for Czech Republic at the 2016 IIHF World Championship.

In the summer of 2025, Jarůšek agreed terms to join Scottish Elite Ice Hockey League side Glasgow Clan for the 2025–26 season.
