= Tomáš Svoboda (ice hockey) =

Czech ice hockey player

- Born: February 24, 1987 (age 38) Litoměřice, Czechoslovakia
- Height: 6 ft 0 in (183 cm)
- Weight: 187 lb (85 kg; 13 st 5 lb)
- Position: Right wing
- Shoots: Right
- 2.Liga team Former teams: Orli Znojmo; HC Slavia Praha; HC Kometa Brno; HC Vítkovice; HC Plzeň; HC Dynamo Pardubice; Piráti Chomutov
- Playing career: 2008–present

Tomáš Svoboda (born February 24, 1987) is a Czech professional ice hockey forward who currently plays for Orli Znojmo of the 2nd Czech Republic Hockey League

Svoboda played previously in the Czech Extraliga for HC Slavia Praha, HC Kometa Brno, HC Vítkovice, HC Plzeň, HC Dynamo Pardubice and Piráti Chomutov.
