= Matěj Stříteský =

Czech ice hockey player

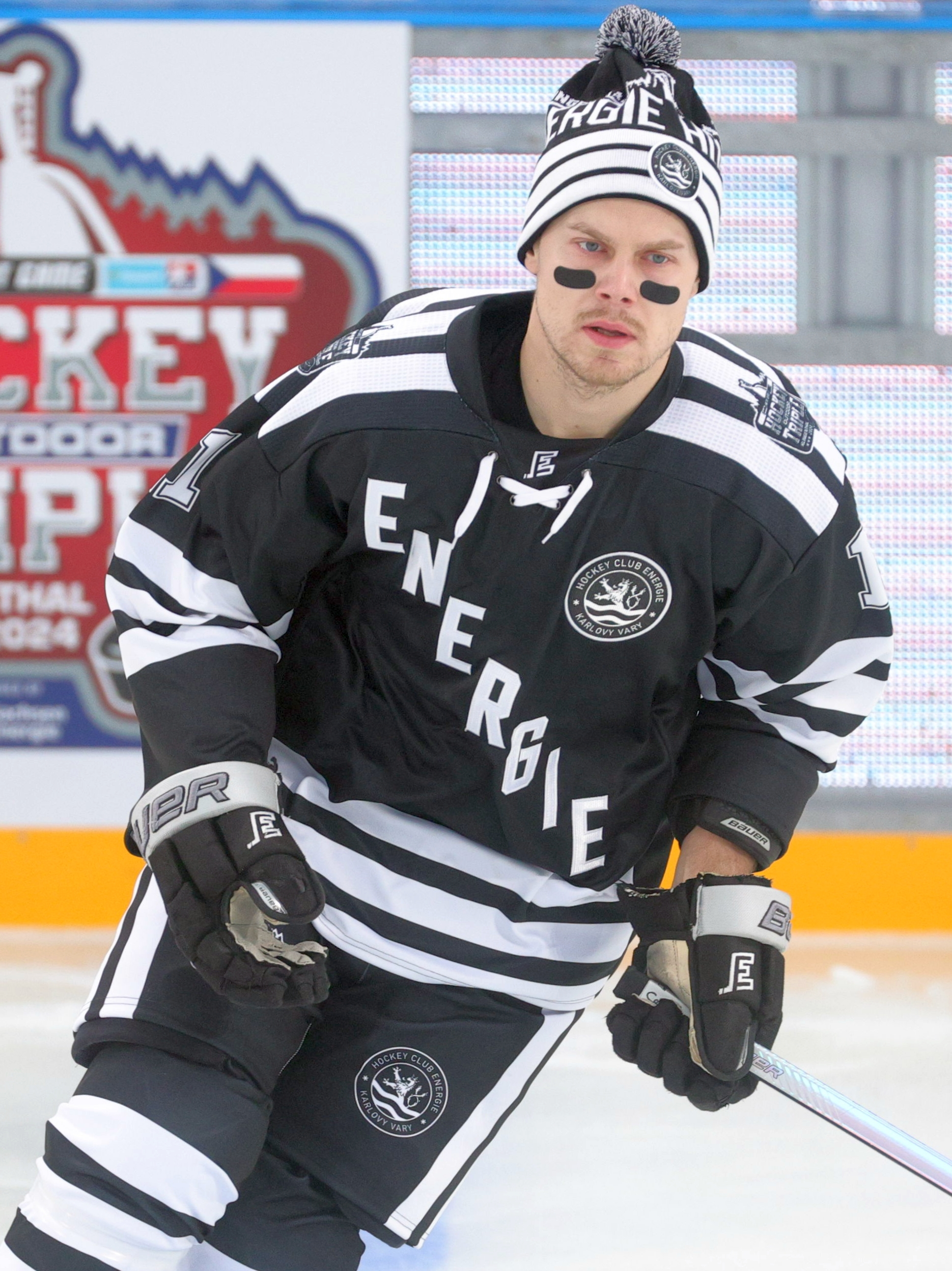
- Stříteský in 2024
- Born: September 20, 1990 (age 35) Vsetín, Czechoslovakia
- Height: 6 ft 0 in (183 cm)
- Weight: 190 lb (86 kg; 13 st 8 lb)
- Position: Defence
- Shoots: Right
- Czech Extraliga team: HC Litvínov
- Playing career: 2006–present

Matěj Stříteský (born September 20, 1990, in Vsetín) is a Czech professional ice hockey defenceman. He played with HC Litvínov in the Czech Extraliga during the 2010–11 Czech Extraliga season.
