= Ško-Energo Aréna =

Sports arena in Mladá Boleslav, Czech Republic

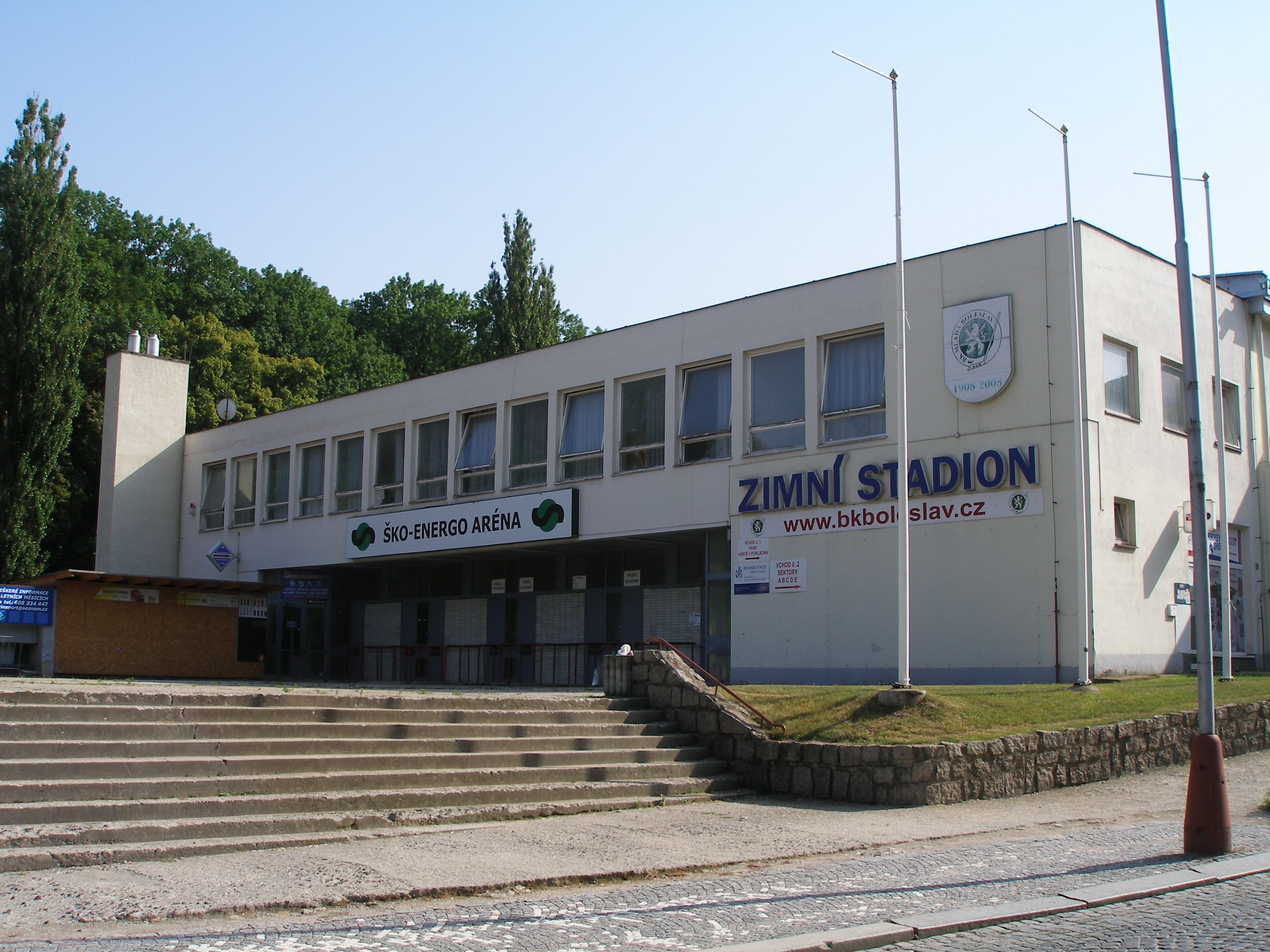
- Interactive map of Ško-Energo Aréna
- Former names: Metrostav Aréna (2008-2011); Zlatopramen Arena (2006-2008); Zimní Stadion (1956-2006)
- Location: Viničná 31, Mladá Boleslav, Czech Republic, 293 01
- Coordinates: 50°24′37″N 14°54′27″E
- Owner: Mladá Boleslav
- Capacity: 4,200
- Field size: 30 m × 60 m (98 ft × 197 ft)

Construction
- Opened: 26 November 1956
- Renovated: 2 October 1980
- Expanded: 2007–2008

Tenant
- BK Mlada Boleslav (Czech Extraliga)

Ško-Energo Aréna is an indoor sporting arena located in Mladá Boleslav, Czech Republic.

It is the home of BK Mladá Boleslav ice hockey club of the Czech Extraliga.
