= Dominik Pacovský =

Czech ice hockey player

Dominik Pacovsky
- Born: June 8, 1990 (age 34); Prague, Czechoslovakia
- Height: 5 ft 11 in (180 cm)
- Weight: 209 lb (95 kg; 14 st 13 lb)
- Position: Forward
- Shoots: Left
- Czech team Former teams: BK Mladá Boleslav; HC Sparta Praha; HC Lev Praha
- Playing career: 2010–present

Dominik Pacovsky (born June 8, 1990) is a Czech professional ice hockey player currently with BK Mladá Boleslav of the Czech Extraliga. He previously played with HC Sparta Praha in the Czech Extraliga during the 2010–11 Czech Extraliga season, and HC Lev Praha in the Kontinental Hockey League. On May 19, 2014, he joined BK Mladá Boleslav on a two-year contract as a free agent.
