= Tomáš Klimenta =

Czech Ice Hockey player

- Born: April 14, 1984 (age 41) Jablonec nad Nisou, Czechoslovakia
- Height: 5 ft 10 in (178 cm)
- Weight: 174 lb (79 kg; 12 st 6 lb)
- Position: Forward
- Shot: Left
- National team: Czech Republic
- Playing career: 1999–2020

Tomáš Klimenta (born 14 April 1984) is a Czech former professional ice hockey player.

Klimenta previously played for HC Berounští Medvědi, BK Mladá Boleslav and HC Benátky nad Jizerou.
