= Logspeed CZ Aréna =

Indoor sporting arena in Plzeň, Czech Republic

LOGSPEED CZ Aréna
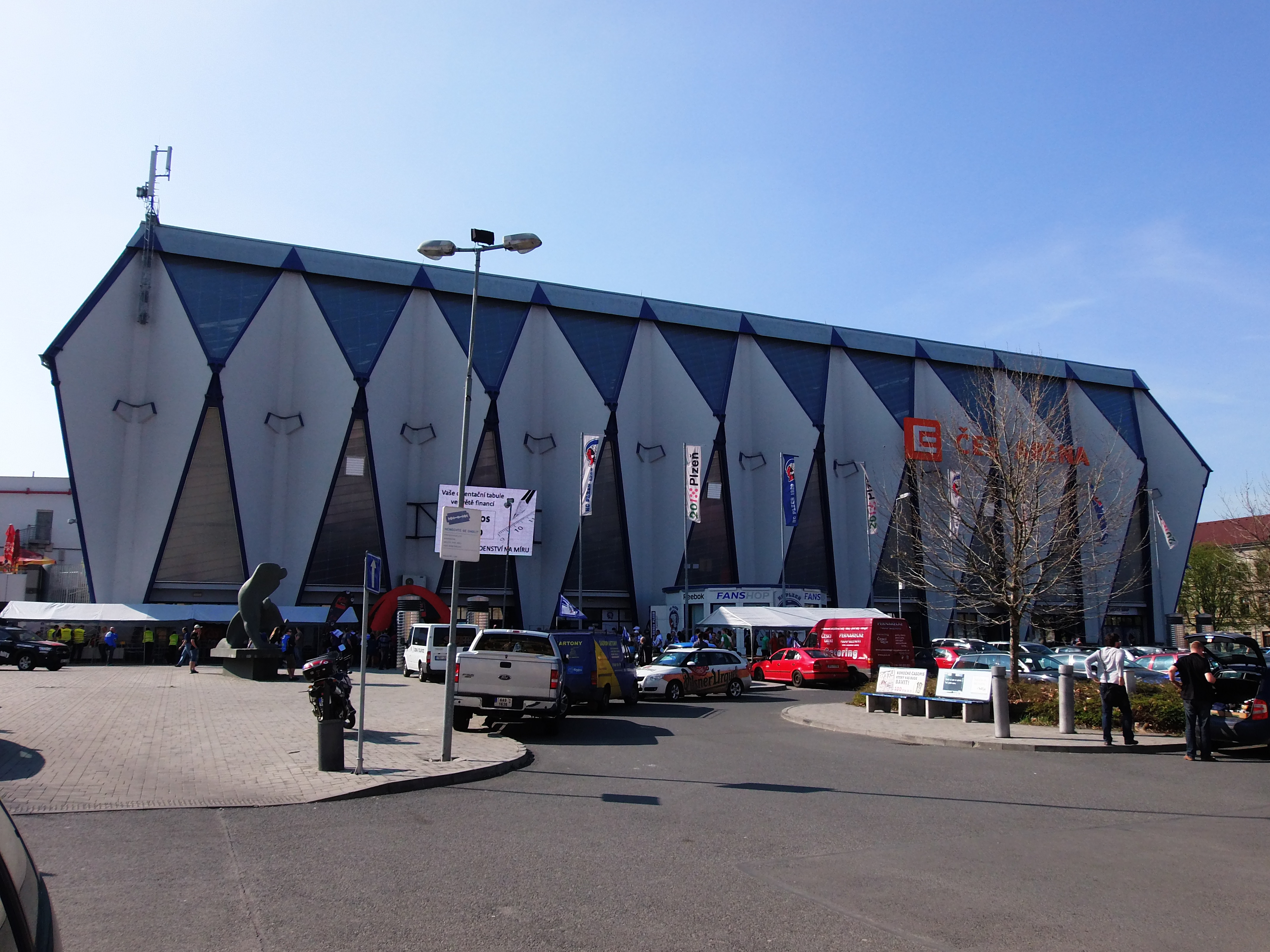
- Interactive map of LOGSPEED CZ Aréna
- Former names: Home Monitoring Aréna (2015–2019); ČEZ Aréna (2005–2015)
- Location: Štefánikovo náměstí 2592/1a, Plzeň, Czech Republic, 301 33
- Coordinates: 49°44′12″N 13°22′39″E
- Owner: Plzeň
- Operator: Magistrát města Plzně
- Capacity: 7,356
- Field size: 28 m × 60 m (92 ft × 197 ft)

Construction
- Opened: 11 February 1950
- Renovated: 1966–1970

Tenant
- HC Škoda Plzeň

LOGSPEED CZ Aréna is an indoor sporting arena located in Plzeň, Czech Republic. The capacity of the arena is 7,356 people. The ice rink was established in 1950 as an open-air stadium, and between 1966 and 1970 the area was developed to cover the playing surface. It is currently home to the HC Škoda Plzeň ice hockey team.

== History ==
HC Škoda Plzeň played at the winter rink, which was built at the site of the city's former cattle market, for the first time on 11 February 1950 competing against Slávia Prešov in a friendly match. In 1951 the hockey team reached the top level of Czechoslovak ice hockey and the rink became a top-tier venue. The venue hosted its first outdoor international match against Swedish side AIK Stockholm, which a crowd of 14,000 witnessed. During a match against Vítkovice on 31 March 1992, a flare set off by one of the attending fans resulted in a major fire at the arena. Between 2002 and 2005, the city of Plzeň spent approximately 150 million Czech koruna to modernise the arena.

The stadium co-hosted the 2005 IIHF World U18 Championships in ice hockey, which was the first international tournament to be hosted there. In 2017 American rock group ZZ Top played at the venue.

== Naming and sponsorship ==
The arena was sponsored by energy company ČEZ Group from 2005, taking the name ČEZ Aréna. This arrangement continued until 2015, when the sponsor made a decision to reduce its sponsorship of sports. In 2015 the new name of the arena was announced as Home Monitoring Aréna. The arena subsequently took the name LOGSPEED CZ Aréna in 2019, ahead of the 2019–20 Czech Extraliga season, on a five-year contract.

== See also ==
- List of indoor arenas in the Czech Republic
