= 2016–17 Champions Hockey League =

European ice hockey tournament

Tournament details
- Dates: 16 August 2016 – 7 February 2017
- Teams: 48

Final positions
- Champions: (Sweden) Frölunda HC (2nd title)
- Runners-up: (Czech Republic) HC Sparta Praha

Tournament statistics
- Games played: 157
- Goals scored: 795 (5.06 per game)
- Attendance: 507,624 (3,233 per game)
- Scoring leader: (United States) Casey Wellman (14 points)

Awards
- MVP: (Sweden) Joel Lundqvist

The 2016–17 Champions Hockey League was the third season of the Champions Hockey League, a European ice hockey tournament launched by 26 founding clubs, six leagues and the International Ice Hockey Federation (IIHF). The season started on 16 August 2016 with the group stage and ended with the final game on 7 February 2017 with Frölunda defeating HC Sparta Praha, 4–3 in overtime.

== Team allocation ==
A total of 48 teams from different European first-tier leagues participated in the 2016–17 Champions Hockey League.

=== Team license ===
The teams were selected based on different licenses for the founding teams, leagues and wildcards.

- A license: The 26 founding teams got an A license, if they played in the first-tier league of their respective domestic league system in the 2016–17 season.
- B license: 12 teams – the regular-season winner and the play-off champion in the 2014–15 season – from each of the founding leagues (the Austrian EBEL, the Czech Extraliga, the Finnish Liiga, the German DEL, the Swedish SHL and the Swiss NLA) received a B licence to the tournament. If those teams had already received an A license, other teams from the league take the B license spots. The order the B licenses were handed out is:
1. National champion
2. Regular season winner
3. Runner-up, regular season
4. Play-off finalist
5. Best placed semifinal loser
6. Worst placed semifinal loser
- C license: There were 10 wild cards. The champions from Norway, Slovakia, Belarus, Denmark, France, the United Kingdom and Poland got wild cards. From Norway and Slovakia a second team, the regular season winner, also got a wild card. One wild card license was assigned to the 2015–16 IIHF Continental Cup winner Dragons de Rouen.

=== Teams ===
Team	City/Area	League	Qualification	License
(Austria) Red Bull Salzburg	Salzburg	Austrian Hockey League	founding club	A
(Austria) Vienna Capitals	Vienna	Austrian Hockey League	founding club	A
(Czech Republic) Bílí Tygři Liberec	Liberec	Czech Extraliga	founding club	A
(Czech Republic) Dynamo Pardubice	Pardubice	Czech Extraliga	founding club	A
(Czech Republic) HC Sparta Praha	Prague	Czech Extraliga	founding club	A
(Czech Republic) Vítkovice Steel	Ostrava	Czech Extraliga	founding club	A
(Finland) HIFK	Helsinki	Liiga	founding club	A
(Finland) JYP	Jyväskylä	Liiga	founding club	A
(Finland) KalPa	Kuopio	Liiga	founding club	A
(Finland) Kärpät	Oulu	Liiga	founding club	A
(Finland) Tappara	Tampere	Liiga	founding club	A
(Finland) TPS	Turku	Liiga	founding club	A
(Germany) Adler Mannheim	Mannheim	Deutsche Eishockey Liga	founding club	A
(Germany) Eisbären Berlin	Berlin	Deutsche Eishockey Liga	founding club	A
(Germany) ERC Ingolstadt	Ingolstadt	Deutsche Eishockey Liga	founding club	A
(Germany) Krefeld Pinguine	Krefeld	Deutsche Eishockey Liga	founding club	A
(Switzerland) SC Bern	Bern	National League A	founding club	A
(Switzerland) Fribourg-Gottéron	Fribourg	National League A	founding club	A
(Switzerland) ZSC Lions	Zürich	National League A	founding club	A
(Switzerland) EV Zug	Zug	National League A	founding club	A
(Sweden) Djurgårdens IF	Stockholm	Swedish Hockey League	founding club	A
(Sweden) Frölunda HC	Gothenburg	Swedish Hockey League	founding club	A
(Sweden) Färjestad BK	Karlstad	Swedish Hockey League	founding club	A
(Sweden) HV71	Jönköping	Swedish Hockey League	founding club	A
(Sweden) Linköpings HC	Linköping	Swedish Hockey League	founding club	A
(Sweden) Luleå HF	Luleå	Swedish Hockey League	founding club	A
(Czech Republic) Orli Znojmo	Znojmo	Austrian Hockey League	regular season runner-up	B
(Austria) Black Wings Linz	Linz	Austrian Hockey League	play-off semi-finalist	B
(Czech Republic) HC Plzeň	Plzeň	Czech Extraliga	play-off semi-finalist	B
(Czech Republic) BK Mladá Boleslav	Mladá Boleslav	Czech Extraliga	play-off semi-finalist	B
(Finland) SaiPa	Lappeenranta	Liiga	regular season 5th	B
(Finland) Lukko	Rauma	Liiga	regular season 6th	B
(Germany) Red Bull München	München	Deutsche Eishockey Liga	play-off champion	B
(Germany) Grizzlys Wolfsburg	Wolfsburg	Deutsche Eishockey Liga	play-off finalist	B
(Switzerland) HC Davos	Davos	National League A	regular season runner-up	B
(Switzerland) HC Lugano	Lugano	National League A	play-off finalist	B
(Sweden) Skellefteå AIK	Skellefteå	Swedish Hockey League	regular season winner	B
(Sweden) Växjö Lakers	Växjö	Swedish Hockey League	play-off semi-finalist	B
(France) Dragons de Rouen	Rouen	Ligue Magnus	Continental Cup winner	C
(Norway) Stavanger Oilers	Stavanger	GET-ligaen	play-off champion	C
(Norway) Lørenskog IK	Lørenskog	GET-ligaen	regular season runner-up	C
(Slovakia) HK Nitra	Nitra	Tipsport Liga	play-off champion	C
(Slovakia) HC Košice	Košice	Tipsport Liga	regular season winner	C
(Denmark) Esbjerg Energy	Esbjerg	Metal Ligaen	play-off champion	C
(France) Rapaces de Gap	Gap	Ligue Magnus	regular season winner ‡	C
(Belarus) Yunost Minsk	Minsk	Belarusian Extraleague	play-off champion	C
(United Kingdom) Sheffield Steelers	Sheffield	Elite Ice Hockey League	regular season champion	C
(Poland) ComArch Cracovia	Kraków	Polska Hokej Liga	play-off champion	C

Notes:

- ‡ – Ligue Magnus champion Dragons de Rouen had already qualified via Continental Cup.

== Group stage ==
Teams in the 2016–17 Champions Hockey League
Black: Group A; Purple: Group B; Blue: Group C; Red: Group D; Orange: Group E; Green: Group F; White: Group G; Yellow: Group H; Brown: Group I; Pink: Group J; Gold: Group K; Turquoise: Group L; Cyan: Group M; Asselian: Group N; Deep pink: Group O; Steel: Group P.

The format remained the same as in the previous season. The group stage began on 16 August and finished on 11 September 2016. The 48 teams were divided into 16 groups of three teams each. Each team played a double round-robin in their group, facing each team at home and on the road, giving 4 games per team. The 16 group winners and the 16 runners-up qualified for the playoffs.

=== Group stage draw ===
The 16 groups were determined by a draw taking place on 3 May 2016 in Zürich, Switzerland. The 48 teams had been ranked and placed into three pots of 16 teams each. Following the draw, each group consisted of one team from each pot. The seedings were as follows:

Pot 1	Pot 2	Pot 3
(Sweden) Frölunda HC (Finland) Tappara (Czech Republic) Bílí Tygři Liberec (Switzerland) SC Bern (Germany) Red Bull München (Austria) Red Bull Salzburg (Sweden) Skellefteå AIK (Finland) HIFK (Czech Republic) HC Sparta Praha (Switzerland) ZSC Lions (Sweden) Luleå HF (Finland) Kärpät (Czech Republic) HC Plzeň (Switzerland) HC Davos (Sweden) Växjö Lakers (Finland) JYP	(Czech Republic) BK Mladá Boleslav (Switzerland) HC Lugano (Sweden) Linköpings HC (Finland) SaiPa (Czech Republic) Vítkovice Steel (Switzerland) EV Zug (Sweden) Färjestad BK (Finland) Lukko (Czech Republic) Dynamo Pardubice (Switzerland) Fribourg-Gottéron (Sweden) Djurgårdens IF (Finland) TPS (Sweden) HV71 (Finland) KalPa (Slovakia) HK Nitra (Slovakia) HC Košice	(Germany) Eisbären Berlin (Czech Republic) Orli Znojmo (Germany) Grizzlys Wolfsburg (Austria) Vienna Capitals (Germany) ERC Ingolstadt (Austria) Black Wings Linz (Germany) Adler Mannheim (Germany) Krefeld Pinguine (Norway) Stavanger Oilers (Denmark) Esbjerg Energy (Belarus) Yunost Minsk (France) Dragons de Rouen (United Kingdom) Sheffield Steelers (Poland) ComArch Cracovia (Norway) Lørenskog IK (France) Rapaces de Gap

=== Tiebreakers ===
The teams were ranked according to points (3 points for a win in regular time, 2 points for an overtime win or shootout win, 1 point for an overtime loss or shootout loss, 0 points for a loss in regular time). If two or more teams were equal on points on completion of the group matches, the following criteria were applied in the order given to determine the rankings:

1. higher number of points obtained in the group matches played among the teams in question;
2. superior goal difference from the group matches played among the teams in question;
3. higher number of goals scored in the group matches played among the teams in question;
4. higher number of wins in regular time in the group matches played among the teams in question;
5. higher number of goals scored in one match in the group matches played among the teams in question;
6. if, after having applied criteria 1 to 5, teams still had an equal ranking in a two-way tie, criteria 1 to 5 were reapplied against the third team in the group. If this procedure did not lead to a decision, criteria 7 to 10 applied;
7. higher number of wins in overtime;
8. higher number of goals scored in shootout (if both matches ended in shootout);
9. if two teams still remained tied and they met in their group's final game, they played a shootout to determine which team is ranked higher;
10. higher pre-draw rankings.

=== Group A ===
Pos	Team	Pld	W	OTW	OTL	L	GF	GA	GD	Pts	Qualification	FHC	WOL	DYN
1	(Sweden) Frölunda HC	4	2	0	1	1	11	9	+2	7	Advance to Playoffs	—	2–3	5–2
2	(Germany) Grizzlys Wolfsburg	4	2	0	0	2	11	10	+1	6	Advance to Playoffs	1–2	—	6–0
3	(Czech Republic) Dynamo Pardubice	4	1	1	0	2	11	14	−3	5		3–2 (SO)	6–1	—

Source: championshockeyleague.net
Rules for classification: Group stage tiebreakers

=== Group B ===
Pos	Team	Pld	W	OTW	OTL	L	GF	GA	GD	Pts	Qualification	DIF	HCD	ROU
1	(Sweden) Djurgårdens IF	4	2	1	0	1	15	6	+9	8	Advance to Playoffs	—	6–0	4–0
2	(Switzerland) HC Davos	4	2	1	0	1	10	10	0	8	Advance to Playoffs	3–1	—	4–1
3	(France) Dragons de Rouen	4	0	0	2	2	6	15	−9	2		3–4 (OT)	2–3 (OT)	—

Source: championshockeyleague.net
Rules for classification: Group stage tiebreakers

=== Group C ===
Pos	Team	Pld	W	OTW	OTL	L	GF	GA	GD	Pts	Qualification	HCL	TAP	MAN
1	(Switzerland) HC Lugano	4	2	1	0	1	11	9	+2	8	Advance to Playoffs	—	1–3	4–3 (OT)
2	(Finland) Tappara	4	2	0	0	2	7	9	−2	6	Advance to Playoffs	1–3	—	2–1
3	(Germany) Adler Mannheim	4	1	0	1	2	10	10	0	4		2–3	4–1	—

Source: championshockeyleague.net
Rules for classification: Group stage tiebreakers

=== Group D ===
Pos	Team	Pld	W	OTW	OTL	L	GF	GA	GD	Pts	Qualification	ZSC	LUK	ING
1	(Switzerland) ZSC Lions	4	3	1	0	0	11	3	+8	11	Advance to Playoffs	—	2–0	2–0
2	(Finland) Lukko	4	1	0	1	2	9	9	0	4	Advance to Playoffs	2–3 (SO)	—	1–3
3	(Germany) ERC Ingolstadt	4	1	0	0	3	5	13	−8	3		1–4	1–6	—

Source: championshockeyleague.net
Rules for classification: Group stage tiebreakers

=== Group E ===
Pos	Team	Pld	W	OTW	OTL	L	GF	GA	GD	Pts	Qualification	KAR	VIT	KRE
1	(Finland) Kärpät	4	3	1	0	0	12	5	+7	11	Advance to Playoffs	—	1–0 (OT)	5–3
2	(Czech Republic) Vítkovice Steel	4	1	0	1	2	7	10	−3	4	Advance to Playoffs	2–4	—	5–3
3	(Germany) Krefeld Pinguine	4	1	0	0	3	8	12	−4	3		0–2	2–0	—

Source: championshockeyleague.net
Rules for classification: Group stage tiebreakers

=== Group F ===
Pos	Team	Pld	W	OTW	OTL	L	GF	GA	GD	Pts	Qualification	FRI	RBM	ZNO
1	(Switzerland) Fribourg-Gottéron	4	3	0	0	1	12	6	+6	9	Advance to Playoffs	—	3–0	5–2
2	(Germany) Red Bull München	4	3	0	0	1	14	7	+7	9	Advance to Playoffs	3–1	—	7–0
3	(Czech Republic) Orli Znojmo	4	0	0	0	4	6	19	−13	0		1–3	3–4	—

Source: championshockeyleague.net
Rules for classification: Group stage tiebreakers

=== Group G ===
Pos	Team	Pld	W	OTW	OTL	L	GF	GA	GD	Pts	Qualification	EVZ	HIFK	ESB
1	(Switzerland) EV Zug	4	3	1	0	0	17	7	+10	11	Advance to Playoffs	—	2–1	3–2 (SO)
2	(Finland) HIFK	4	1	0	1	2	13	11	+2	4	Advance to Playoffs	1–4	—	7–0
3	(Denmark) Esbjerg Energy	4	0	1	1	2	10	22	−12	3		3–8	5–4 (OT)	—

Source: championshockeyleague.net
Rules for classification: Group stage tiebreakers

=== Group H ===
Pos	Team	Pld	W	OTW	OTL	L	GF	GA	GD	Pts	Qualification	TPS	LIB	LIK
1	(Finland) TPS	4	3	1	0	0	15	3	+12	11	Advance to Playoffs	—	3–1	4–1
2	(Czech Republic) Bílí Tygři Liberec	4	1	1	1	1	8	9	−1	6	Advance to Playoffs	1–2 (SO)	—	4–3 (OT)
3	(Norway) Lørenskog IK	4	0	0	1	3	5	16	−11	1		0–6	1–2	—

Source: championshockeyleague.net
Rules for classification: Group stage tiebreakers

=== Group I ===
Pos	Team	Pld	W	OTW	OTL	L	GF	GA	GD	Pts	Qualification	SAI	BER	LHF
1	(Finland) SaiPa	4	3	1	0	0	17	9	+8	11	Advance to Playoffs	—	6–3	3–2 (SO)
2	(Germany) Eisbären Berlin	4	2	0	0	2	12	13	−1	6	Advance to Playoffs	2–4	—	2–1
3	(Sweden) Luleå HF	4	0	0	1	3	7	14	−7	1		2–4	2–5	—

Source: championshockeyleague.net
Rules for classification: Group stage tiebreakers

=== Group J ===
Pos	Team	Pld	W	OTW	OTL	L	GF	GA	GD	Pts	Qualification	NIT	PLZ	OIL
1	(Slovakia) HK Nitra	4	3	0	0	1	9	6	+3	9	Advance to Playoffs	—	2–1	2–1
2	(Czech Republic) HC Plzeň	4	2	0	0	2	12	10	+2	6	Advance to Playoffs	2–4	—	6–4
3	(Norway) Stavanger Oilers	4	1	0	0	3	7	12	−5	3		2–1	0–3	—

Source: championshockeyleague.net
Rules for classification: Group stage tiebreakers

=== Group K ===
Pos	Team	Pld	W	OTW	OTL	L	GF	GA	GD	Pts	Qualification	LHC	JYP	GAP
1	(Sweden) Linköpings HC	4	4	0	0	0	16	5	+11	12	Advance to Playoffs	—	4–3	6–1
2	(Finland) JYP	4	2	0	0	2	12	9	+3	6	Advance to Playoffs	1–4	—	4–0
3	(France) Rapaces de Gap	4	0	0	0	4	2	16	−14	0		0–2	1–4	—

Source: championshockeyleague.net
Rules for classification: Group stage tiebreakers

=== Group L ===
Pos	Team	Pld	W	OTW	OTL	L	GF	GA	GD	Pts	Qualification	VLH	YUN	MLB
1	(Sweden) Växjö Lakers	4	2	0	2	0	16	10	+6	8	Advance to Playoffs	—	4–0	7–3
2	(Belarus) Yunost Minsk	4	1	1	0	2	10	13	−3	5	Advance to Playoffs	4–3 (OT)	—	4–3
3	(Czech Republic) BK Mladá Boleslav	4	1	1	0	2	12	15	−3	5		3–2 (SO)	3–2	—

Source: championshockeyleague.net
Rules for classification: Group stage tiebreakers

=== Group M ===
Pos	Team	Pld	W	OTW	OTL	L	GF	GA	GD	Pts	Qualification	SCB	KOS	BWL
1	(Switzerland) SC Bern	4	4	0	0	0	17	5	+12	12	Advance to Playoffs	—	3–1	5–0
2	(Slovakia) HC Košice	4	1	0	0	3	10	15	−5	3	Advance to Playoffs	3–6	—	2–3
3	(Austria) Black Wings Linz	4	1	0	0	3	7	14	−7	3		1–3	3–4	—

Source: championshockeyleague.net
Rules for classification: Group stage tiebreakers

=== Group N ===
Pos	Team	Pld	W	OTW	OTL	L	GF	GA	GD	Pts	Qualification	SKE	KAL	VIC
1	(Sweden) Skellefteå AIK	4	2	0	1	1	10	9	+1	7	Advance to Playoffs	—	4–0	2–5
2	(Finland) KalPa	4	2	0	0	2	7	8	−1	6	Advance to Playoffs	1–2	—	3–1
3	(Austria) Vienna Capitals	4	1	1	0	2	10	10	0	5		3–2 (OT)	1–3	—

Source: championshockeyleague.net
Rules for classification: Group stage tiebreakers

=== Group O ===
Pos	Team	Pld	W	OTW	OTL	L	GF	GA	GD	Pts	Qualification	FBK	SPA	CRA
1	(Sweden) Färjestad BK	4	3	0	1	0	16	5	+11	10	Advance to Playoffs	—	2–3 (OT)	7–0
2	(Czech Republic) HC Sparta Praha	4	2	1	0	1	16	10	+6	8	Advance to Playoffs	1–2	—	5–4
3	(Poland) ComArch Cracovia	4	0	0	0	4	7	24	−17	0		1–5	2–7	—

Source: championshockeyleague.net
Rules for classification: Group stage tiebreakers

=== Group P ===
Pos	Team	Pld	W	OTW	OTL	L	GF	GA	GD	Pts	Qualification	HV71	RBS	SHE
1	(Sweden) HV71	4	3	0	0	1	16	9	+7	9	Advance to Playoffs	—	1–2	5–3
2	(Austria) Red Bull Salzburg	4	2	0	0	2	14	12	+2	6	Advance to Playoffs	2–5	—	8–1
3	(United Kingdom) Sheffield Steelers	4	1	0	0	3	11	20	−9	3		2–5	5–2	—

Source: championshockeyleague.net
Rules for classification: Group stage tiebreakers

== Playoffs ==
In the playoffs, the teams play against each other over two legs on a home-and-away basis with the team with the better standing after the group stage having the second game at home, except for the one-match final played at the venue of the team with the best competition track record leading up to the final.

The mechanism of the draw for playoffs was as follows:

- The entire playoff was drawn on 12 September 2016 and determined the sixteen pairings for the Round of 32. Also at the draw, all matches up to the final were set in the bracket.
- In the draw for the Round of 32, the 16 group winners were seeded, and the 16 runners-up were unseeded. The seeded teamswere drawn against the unseeded teams, with the seeded teams hosting the second leg. Teams from the same group could be drawn against each other, but teams from the same league or country could be paired in any round.

=== Playoff teams ===
Group	Winners (Seeded in round of 32 draw)	Runners-up (Unseeded in round of 32 draw)
A	(Sweden) Frölunda HC	(Germany) EHC Wolfsburg
B	(Sweden) Djurgårdens IF	(Switzerland) HC Davos
C	(Switzerland) HC Lugano	(Finland) Tappara
D	(Switzerland) ZSC Lions	(Finland) Lukko
E	(Finland) Kärpät	(Czech Republic) Vítkovice Steel
F	(Switzerland) Fribourg-Gottéron	(Germany) Red Bull München
G	(Switzerland) EV Zug	(Finland) HIFK
H	(Finland) TPS	(Czech Republic) Bílí Tygři Liberec
I	(Finland) SaiPa	(Germany) Eisbären Berlin
J	(Slovakia) HK Nitra	(Czech Republic) HC Plzeň
K	(Sweden) Linköpings HC	(Finland) JYP
L	(Sweden) Växjö Lakers	(Belarus) Yunost Minsk
M	(Switzerland) SC Bern	(Slovakia) HC Košice
N	(Sweden) Skellefteå AIK	(Finland) KalPa
O	(Sweden) Färjestad BK	(Czech Republic) HC Sparta Praha
P	(Sweden) HV71	(Austria) EC Red Bull Salzburg

=== Bracket ===
Round of 32
(Czech Republic) Bílí Tygři Liberec	4	0	4
(Sweden) Färjestad BK	1	2	3
(Czech Republic) Vítkovice Steel	7	5	12
(Slovakia) HK Nitra	0	0	0
(Finland) KalPa	2	1	3
(Sweden) Djurgårdens IF	0	2	2
(Slovakia) HC Košice	1	1	2
(Switzerland) Fribourg-Gottéron	1	4	5
(Belarus) Yunost Minsk	3	0	3
(Sweden) Frölunda HC	2	5	7
(Germany) Eisbären Berlin	4	2	6
(Switzerland) EV Zug	0	1	1
(Switzerland) HC Davos	4	3	7
(Sweden) Linköpings HC	7	2	9
(Finland) HIFK (SO)	1	4	5(2)
(Finland) TPS	1	4	5(1)
(Germany) EHC Wolfsburg	1	2	3
(Switzerland) ZSC Lions	4	5	9
(Czech Republic) HC Plzeň	1	3	4
(Switzerland) HC Lugano	4	3	7
(Finland) Tappara	0	2	2
(Finland) SaiPa	2	4	6
(Germany) Red Bull München	1	3	4
(Sweden) Växjö Lakers	1	4	5
(Czech Republic) HC Sparta Praha (OT)	1	1	2
(Finland) Kärpät	1	0	1
(Finland) Lukko	0	3	3
(Sweden) HV71	2	4	6
(Finland) JYP	4	2	6
(Sweden) Skellefteå AIK	0	4	4
(Austria) EC Red Bull Salzburg	1	3	4
(Switzerland) SC Bern	4	3	7

Round of 16
(Czech Republic) Bílí Tygři Liberec	1	1	2
(Czech Republic) Vítkovice Steel	0	3	3
(Finland) KalPa	1	2	3
(Switzerland) Fribourg-Gottéron	1	3	4
(Germany) Eisbären Berlin	1	1	2
(Sweden) Frölunda HC	6	4	10
(Sweden) Linköpings HC	1	1	2
(Finland) HIFK	1	0	1
(Switzerland) HC Lugano	3	2	5
(Switzerland) ZSC Lions	2	4	6
(Finland) SaiPa	3	2	5
(Sweden) Växjö Lakers	2	4	6
(Czech Republic) HC Sparta Praha	2	5	7
(Sweden) HV71	4	0	4
(Switzerland) SC Bern	3	3	6
(Finland) JYP	2	3	5

Quarter-finals
(Czech Republic) Vítkovice Steel	2	2	4
(Switzerland) Fribourg-Gottéron	5	3	8
(Sweden) Frölunda HC	4	5	9
(Sweden) Linköpings HC	0	2	2
(Switzerland) ZSC Lions	0	2	2
(Sweden) Växjö Lakers	0	3	3
(Switzerland) SC Bern	1	1	2
(Czech Republic) HC Sparta Praha	1	4	5

Semi-finals
(Sweden) Frölunda HC	5	4	9
(Switzerland) Fribourg-Gottéron	1	0	1
(Sweden) Växjö Lakers	1	0	1
(Czech Republic) HC Sparta Praha	2	4	6

Final
(Sweden) Frölunda HC	4
(Czech Republic) HC Sparta Praha	3

Note:

1. The teams listed on top of each tie play first match at home and the bottom team plays second match at home.
2. The order of the legs (what team starts at home) in the future rounds may be changed as the team with best record should have second match at home.

=== Round of 32 ===
The draw for the entire playoff (round of 32, round of 16, quarter-finals, semi-finals and final) was held on 12 September 2016. The first legs were played on 4 October, and the second legs on 11 October 2016. The seeded teams (group winners) played the last match at home.

Team 1	Agg.	Team 2	1st leg	2nd leg
Bílí Tygři Liberec (Czech Republic)	4–3	(Sweden) Färjestad BK	4–1	0–2
Vítkovice Steel (Czech Republic)	12–0	(Slovakia) HK Nitra	7–0	5–0
KalPa (Finland)	3–2	(Sweden) Djurgårdens IF	2–0	1–2
HC Košice (Slovakia)	2–5	(Switzerland) Fribourg-Gottéron	1–1	1–4
Yunost Minsk (Belarus)	3–7	(Sweden) Frölunda HC	3–2	0–5
Eisbären Berlin (Germany)	6–1	(Switzerland) EV Zug	4–0	2–1
HC Davos (Switzerland)	7–9	(Sweden) Linköpings HC	4–7	3–2
TPS (Finland)	5–6	(Finland) HIFK	1–1	4–5 (SO)
EHC Wolfsburg (Germany)	3–9	(Switzerland) ZSC Lions	1–4	2–5
HC Lugano (Switzerland)	7–4	(Czech Republic) HC Plzeň	4–1	3–3
Tappara (Finland)	2–6	(Finland) SaiPa	0–2	2–4
Red Bull München (Germany)	4–5	(Sweden) Växjö Lakers	1–1	3–4
HC Sparta Praha (Czech Republic)	2–1	(Finland) Kärpät	1–1	1–0 (OT)
HV71 (Sweden)	6–3	(Finland) Lukko	2–0	4–3
JYP (Finland)	6–4	(Sweden) Skellefteå AIK	4–0	2–4
EC Red Bull Salzburg (Austria)	4–7	(Switzerland) SC Bern	1–4	3–3

==== First Leg ====
4 October 2016; 16:00	Vítkovice Steel (Czech Republic)	7–0 (1–0, 2–0, 4–0)	(Slovakia) HK Nitra	ČEZ Aréna, Ostrava; Attendance: 4,215

Game reference

Daniel Dolejš
Goalies
Michal Valent (pulled at 49:35) Frederik Foltán

Tomi (Sloboda) (SHG) – 5:46	1–0
Vandas (Baranka, Kolouch) – 31:14	2–0
Hudeček (Tomi, Kovář) – 37:01	3–0
Roman (Olesz, Vandas) (PP) – 40:20	4–0
Sloboda (Roman) (PP) – 47:20	5–0
Roman (Vandas, Sloboda) (PP) – 49:35	6–0
Olesz – 54:21	7–0

8 min
Penalties
8 min

4 October 2016; 16:00	Yunost Minsk (Belarus)	3–2 (1–1, 2–0, 0–1)	(Sweden) Frölunda HC	Chizhovka-Arena, Minsk; Attendance: 5,500

Game reference

Dmitri Milchakov
Goalies
Johan Gustafsson

	0–1	5:36 – Vesalainen (Lundqvist)
Turkin (Karakulko, Yefimenko) – 12:27	1–1
Razvadovsky (Zakharov, Goroshko) – 23:15	2–1
Chernook (Yefimenko, Turkin) (PP) – 31:46	3–1
	3–2	55:36 – (PP) Wellman (Tömmernes)

6 min
Penalties
8 min

4 October 2016; 17:00	HC Sparta Praha (Czech Republic)	1–1 (0–0, 0–1, 1–0)	(Finland) Kärpät	O2 Arena, Prague; Attendance: 2,288

Game reference
Tomáš Pöpperle	Goalies	Sami Aittokallio
/ 0–1 / 29:31 – Humaloja; Mikuš (Ihnacak) – 46:33 / 1–1
6 min	Penalties	20 min

4 October 2016; 17:00	Bílí Tygři Liberec (Czech Republic)	4–1 (1–0, 2–1, 1–0)	(Sweden) Färjestad BK	Home Credit Arena, Liberec; Attendance: 3,845

Game reference

Roman Will
Goalies
Stefan Steen

Bartovič – 9:18	1–0
Jelínek (Stránský) – 22:44	2–0
Lakatoš (Svačina) (PP) – 23:27	3–0
	3–1	28:54 – Persson (Persson, Svensson)
Bartovič (SHG) – 47:57	4–1

8 min
Penalties
6 min

4 October 2016; 17:00	Red Bull München (Germany)	1–1 (0–1, 1–0, 0–0)	(Sweden) Växjö Lakers	Olympia Eishalle, Munich; Attendance: 2,090

Game reference
David Leggio	Goalies	Viktor Andrén
/ 0–1 / 17:46 – Brodecki (Murphy, Everberg); Flaake (Jaffray) – 39:45 / 1–1
25 min	Penalties	6 min

4 October 2016	JYP (Finland)	4–0 (2–0, 0–0, 2–0)	(Sweden) Skellefteå AIK	Synergia-areena, Jyväskylä; Attendance: 1,706

Game reference

Pekka Tuokkola
Goalies
Gustaf Lindvall

Tuppurainen (Nattinen, Uotila) – 4:25	1–0
Salmio (Yonkman, Turkulainen) – 19:39	2–0
Pihlman (Nattinen, Tuppurainen) (PP, 5 ON 3) – 41:23	3–0
Suomela (Kolehmainen) – 57:43	4–0

6 min
Penalties
14 min

4 October 2016; 17:00	KalPa (Finland)	2–0 (1–0, 0–0, 1–0)	(Sweden) Djurgårdens IF	Data Group Areena, Kuopio; Attendance: 2,043

Game reference
Eero Kilpeläinen	Goalies	Mikael Tellqvist
Ruuttu (Riikola, Nikko) – 7:31 / 1–0; Myttynen (Mikkola) – 59:47 / 2–0
10 min	Penalties	8 min

4 October 2016; 17:00	TPS (Finland)	1–1 (0–1, 1–0, 0–0)	(Finland) HIFK	HK Areena, Turku; Attendance: 1,658

Game reference
Oskari Setänen	Goalies	Kevin Lankinen
/ 0–1 / 8:21 – Eronen (Åsten); Virta (Heikkinen, Kallio) (PP) – 38:08 / 1–1
8 min	Penalties	4 min

4 October 2016; 17:00	Tappara (Finland)	0–2 (0–0, 0–1, 0–1)	(Finland) SaiPa	Hakametsä Stadium, Tampere; Attendance: 3,478

Game reference
Teemu Lassila	Goalies	Jussi Olkinuora
0–1 / 23:57 – Leivo (Stromberg, Lappalainen); 0–2 / 55:06 – Koski (Vainikainen)
10 min	Penalties	4 min

4 October 2016; 18:30	EC Red Bull Salzburg (Austria)	1–4 (0–2, 0–0, 1–2)	(Switzerland) SC Bern	Eisarena Salzburg, Salzburg; Attendance: 1,814

Game reference

Bernhard Starkbaum
Goalies
Leonardo Genoni

	0–1	8:04 – Noreau (Lasch, Arcobello)
	0–2	10:46 – Arcobello (Gerber, Noreau)
	0–3	44:30 – (PP) Blum (Arcobello, Hischier)
	0–4	51:00 – Plüss (Lasch, Gerber)
Thomas (Raymond) – 59:21	1–4

8 min
Penalties
10 min

4 October 2016; 18:30	EHC Wolfsburg (Germany)	1–4 (0–2, 1–1, 0–1)	(Switzerland) ZSC Lions	Eis Arena Wolfsburg, Wolfsburg; Attendance: 1,697

Game reference

Sebastian Vogl
Goalies
Lukas Flüeler

	0–1	1:19 – Cunti (Wick, Nilsson)
	0–2	17:59 – (PP) Sjögren (Blindenbacher)
Aubin (Mulock, Likens) (PP) – 37:24	1–2
	1–3	37:37 – Nilsson (Wick)
	1–4	53:22 – (PP, 5 ON 3) Bartschi (Shannon, Blindenbacher)

24 min
Penalties
8 min

4 October 2016; 18:30	Eisbären Berlin (Germany)	4–0 (1–0, 2–0, 1–0)	(Switzerland) EV Zug	Mercedes-Benz Arena, Berlin; Attendance: 4,722

Game reference

Petri Vehanen
Goalies
Tobias Stephan

Petersen (MacQueen, Braun) – 8:26	1–0
Tallackson (Petersen, Olver) – 24:41	2–0
Rankel (Wilson, Tallackson) (PP) – 39:31	3–0
MacQueen (Ziegler, Olver) (PP) – 41:40	4–0

35 min
Penalties
50 min

4 October 2016; 18:45	HC Lugano (Switzerland)	4–1 (0–0, 2–1, 2–0)	(Czech Republic) HC Plzeň	Resega, Lugano; Attendance: 4,763

Game reference

Elvis Merzlikins
Goalies
Matěj Machovský

Hofmann (Hirschi, Brunner) – 22:12	1–0
Klasen (Martensson, Zackrisson) – 25:23	2–0
	2–1	35:15 – Lev (Indrák, Slovák)
Fazzini (Buergler, Hofmann) (PP) – 47:37	3–1
Gardner (Bertaggia) – 49:04	4–1

6 min
Penalties
8 min

4 October 2016; 18:45	HC Košice (Slovakia)	1–1 (1–0, 0–0, 0–1)	(Switzerland) Fribourg-Gottéron	Steel Aréna, Košice; Attendance: 4,446

Game reference
Miroslav Kopřiva	Goalies	Benjamin Conz
Nagy (Boltun, Deyl) (PP) – 15:31 / Goals / 53:06 – Červenka (Rathgeb)
12 min	Penalties	16 min

4 October 2016; 18:45	HC Davos (Switzerland)	4–7 (2–3, 1–4, 1–0)	(Sweden) Linköpings HC	Vaillant Arena, Davos; Attendance: 3,087

Game reference

Joren van Pottelberghe
Goalies
Marcus Högberg

	0–1	0:29 – Galló (Sylvegård, Persson)
	0–2	1:28 – Fogström (Little)
Sciaroni (Walser) (SHG) – 8:29	1–2
	1–3	16:38 – Galló (Sylvegård, Persson)
Ambühl (Wieser, Forster) – 19:32	2–3
	2–4	22:32 – Karterud (Tornqvist)
	2–5	32:35 – Lundgren
	2–6	33:37 – Gordon (Little, Fogström)
Lindgren (Ambühl, Forster) – 34:07	3–6
	3–7	34:48 – (PP) Gordon (Roe, Little)
Corvi (Walser, Schneeberger) (PP) – 45:21	4–7

12 min
Penalties
12 min

4 October 2016; 19:00	HV71 (Sweden)	2–0 (2–0, 0–0, 0–0)	(Finland) Lukko	Kinnarps Arena, Jönköping; Attendance: 672

Game reference
Linus Söderström	Goalies	Kaapo Kähkönen
Reese (Tedenby) – 0:38 / 1–0; Brithen (Thörnberg) – 5:30 / 2–0
22 min	Penalties	24 min

==== Second Leg ====
11 October 2016; 17:00	HK Nitra (Slovakia)	0–5 (0–2, 0–1, 0–2)	(Czech Republic) Vítkovice Steel	Nitra Aréna, Nitra; Attendance: 1,679

Game reference

Michal Valent
Goalies
Daniel Dolejš

0–1	2:44 – Květoň (Zdráhal)
0–2	16:18 – Tomi (Hudeček, Illes)
0–3	34:24 – Illes (Hudeček)
0–4	50:56 – (PP) Vandas (Kolouch)
0–5	55:24 – Szturc (Jáchym)

60 min
Penalties
54 min

Vítkovice Steel won 12–0 on Aggregate.

11 October 2016; 17:00	HC Plzeň (Czech Republic)	3–3 (1–1, 1–1, 1–1)	(Switzerland) HC Lugano	Home Monitoring Arena, Plzeň; Attendance: 2,065

Game reference

Lukáš Sochůrek
Goalies
Daniel Manzato

Lev (Kracíkz) – 7:51	1–0
	1–1	9:47 – Zackrisson (Sartori, Martensson)
	1–2	26:49 – Hofmann (Ulmer)
Kodýtek (Pulpán) – 30:39	2–2
	2–3	47:39 – Sannitz (Gardner, Bertaggia)
Svoboda (Kratěna) – 59:51	3–3

20 min
Penalties
16 min

HC Lugano won 7–4 on Aggregate.

11 October 2016; 17:00	HIFK (Finland)	5–4 (SO 2–1) (2–1, 1–2, 1–1) (0–0) (SO 1–0)	(Finland) TPS	Helsingin Jäähalli, Helsinki; Attendance: 3,198

Game reference

Kevin Lankinen
Goalies
Oskari Setänen

	0–1	1:59 – Siiki (Väyrynen)
Ikonen (Åsten, Nykopp) – 12:26	1–1
Elkins (Aaltonen, Heiskanen) – 16:39	2–1
	2–2	20:48 – Pikkarainen (Berger, Spina)
	2–3	22:58 – Taavitsainen
Åsten (Heiskanen, Nykopp – 33:29	3–3
Eronen (Partanen, Puustinen) – 54:09	4–3
	4–4	59:06 – (EA) Eronen (Pikkarainen)
Elkins (GWSOG) – 65:00	5–4

Puustinen
Partanen (miss)
Elkins
Saarelainen
Ikonen (miss)
Shootout
(miss) Virta
Heikkinen
(miss) Thorell
(miss) Spina
(miss) Virtanen
6 min
Penalties
6 min

HIFK won 6–5 on Aggregate after winning 2–1 in a shootout.

11 October 2016; 17:00	Kärpät (Finland)	0–1 (OT) (0–0, 0–0, 0–0) (OT 0–1)	(Czech Republic) HC Sparta Praha	Oulun Energia Areena, Oulu; Attendance: 2,392

Game reference
Sami Aittokallio	Goalies	Tomáš Pöpperle
0–1 / 63:43 – Forman (Vrána)
4 min	Penalties	6 min

HC Sparta Praha won 2–1 on Aggregate in Overtime.

11 October 2016; 17:00	Lukko (Finland)	3–4 (2–2, 1–2, 0–0)	(Sweden) HV71	Kivikylän Areena, Rauma; Attendance: 2,494

Game reference

Kaapo Kähkönen
Goalies
Linus Söderström

Tiivola (Antonen, Ahonen) – 3:33	1–0
	1–1	7:06 – Tedenby (Almquist, Andersson)
Gagnon (Virtanen) – 8:42	2–1
	2–2	15:29 – (PP) Brithen (Reese)
Virtanen (Vahalahti, Ahonen) – 25:39	3–2
	3–3	32:26 – Torngren (Stenlund, Sandberg)
	3–4	36:27 – Andersson (Hansson)

8 min
Penalties
2 min

HV71 won 6–3 on Aggregate.

11 October 2016; 17:00	SaiPa (Finland)	4–2 (1–1, 2–1, 1–0)	(Finland) Tappara	Kisapuisto, Lappeenranta; Attendance: 1,925

Game reference

Jussi Markkanen
Goalies
Teemu Lassila

Koskiranta (Bäckman, Hamilton) – 7:18	1–0
	1–1	18:12 – Honkanen (Elorinne, Heikkilä)
Kuronen (Leivo, Koski) – 26:49	2–1
	2–2	27:31 – Honkanen (Heikkilä, Rauhala)
Koski (Leivo, Kuronen) – 28:52	3–2
Trotter (Maalahti, Carson) (PP) – 44:41	4–2

10 min
Penalties
8 min

SaiPa won 6–2 on Aggregate.

11 October 2016; 18:00	Frölunda HC (Sweden)	5–0 (1–0, 3–0, 1–0)	(Belarus) Yunost Minsk	Frölundaborg, Gothenburg; Attendance: 1,042

Game reference

Johan Gustafsson
Goalies
Dmitri Milchakov

Lasu (Stålberg) – 18:25	1–0
Figren (Vesalainen, Lundqvist) – 21:05	2–0
Carlsson (Sundström, Tömmernes) (PP) – 33:08	3–0
Tömmernes (Grundström, Lasu) – 39:03	4–0
Hjalmarsson (Olofsson, Carlsson) – 45:54	5–0

2 min
Penalties
16 min

Frölunda HC won 7–3 on Aggregate.

11 October 2016; 18:00	Djurgårdens IF (Sweden)	2–1 (0–1, 1–0, 1–0)	(Finland) KalPa	Hovet, Stockholm; Attendance: 756

Game reference

Adam Reideborn
Goalies
Eero Kilpeläinen

	0–1	13:55 – Jokinen (Sebok, Mankinen)
Kousa (Ikonen, Brodin) (PP) – 23:11	1–1
Tambellini (PP, EA) – 57:25	2–1

18 min
Penalties
14 min

KalPa won 3–2 on Aggregate.

11 October 2016; 18:00	Färjestad BK (Sweden)	2–0 (0–0, 1–0, 1–0)	(Czech Republic) Bílí Tygři Liberec	Löfbergs Arena, Karlstad; Attendance: 1,832

Game reference
Lars Haugen	Goalies	Roman Will
Nygård (Persson) (SHG) – 20:40 / 1–0; Nygren (EA) – 58:28 / 2–0
33 min	Penalties	4 min

Bílí Tygři Liberec won 4–3 on Aggregate.

11 October 2016; 18:00	Växjö Lakers (Sweden)	4–3 (1–1, 3–1, 0–1)	(Germany) Red Bull München	Vida Arena, Växjö; Attendance: 1,584

Game reference

Joacim Eriksson
Goalies
Danny aus den Birken

Palola (Martinsson, Brodecki) (PP) – 2:39	1–0
	1–1	15:27 – Kastner (Eder)
	1–2	22:25 – Regehr (Flaake)
Palola (Martinsson, Brodecki) (PP) – 27:26	2–2
Hillding (Platt, Brodecki) – 30:29	3–2
Fröberg (Lundberg, Storm) – 37:33	4–2
	4–3	51:44 – (PP) Flaake (Kahun, Matsumoto)

2 min
Penalties
16 min

Växjö Lakers won 5–4 on Aggregate.

11 October 2016; 18:00	Skellefteå AIK (Sweden)	4–2 (1–1, 2–1, 1–0)	(Finland) JYP	Skellefteå Kraft Arena, Skellefteå; Attendance: 1,543

Game reference

Gustaf Lindvall
Goalies
Markus Ruusu

Burström (Lindström) – 11:00	1–0
	1–1	11:33 – Nattinen
Lindström Lindholm, Aho) – 20:49	2–1
Aho (Lindström) – 25:52	3–1
	3–2	36:33 – (SHG) Louhivaara
Ohlsson (Wingerli, Krekula)	4–2

4 min
Penalties
14 min

JYP won 6–4 on Aggregate.

11 October 2016; 18:45	ZSC Lions (Switzerland)	5–2 (0–1, 2–0, 3–1)	(Germany) EHC Wolfsburg	Hallenstadion, Zürich; Attendance: 3,067

Game reference

Lukas Flüeler
Goalies
Sebastian Vogl

	0–1	7:42 – Likens (Mulock, Vogl)
Baltisberger (Schappi, Shannon) (PP, 5 ON 3) – 33:36	1–1
Thoresen (Baltisberger, Shannon) – 38:26	2–1
Baltisberger – 41:22	3–1
	3–2	44:07 – (PP) Fauser (Pfohl)
Suter (SHG) – 50:04	4–2
Herzog (Suter) – 52:33	5–2

6 min
Penalties
8 min

ZSC Lions won 9–3 on Aggregate.

11 October 2016; 18:45	Fribourg-Gottéron (Switzerland)	4–1 (1–0, 1–1, 2–0)	(Slovakia) HC Košice	BCF Arena, Fribourg; Attendance: 1,610

Game reference

Benjamin Conz
Goalies
Miroslav Kopřiva

Rivera (Rathgeb) – 8:22	1–0
	1–1	27:59 – Milý
Kienzle (Mottet) (PP) – 31:12	2–1
Rathgeb (Červenka) – 40:39	3–1
Červenka (Sprunger) – 41:15	4–1

6 min
Penalties
12 min

HC Fribourg-Gottéron won 5–2 on Aggregate.

11 October 2016; 18:45	EV Zug (Switzerland)	1–2 (0–0, 1–0, 0–2)	(Germany) Eisbären Berlin	Bossard Arena, Zug; Attendance: 4,692

Game reference

Tobias Stephan
Goalies
Marvin Cupper

Lammer (Grossmann) (PP) – 26:34	1–0
	1–1	48:39 – Rankel (Wilson)
	1–2	55:17 – Olver (Hördler) (ENG)

10 min
Penalties
12 min

Eisbären Berlin won 6–1 on Aggregate.

11 October 2016; 18:45	SC Bern (Switzerland)	3–3 (1–1, 2–2, 0–0)	(Austria) EC Red Bull Salzburg	PostFinance Arena, Bern; Attendance: 13,669

Game reference

Leonardo Genoni
Goalies
Bernhard Starkbaum (Until 24:02) Luka Gracnar

Plüss (Hischier) – 5:22	1–0
	1–1	14:44 – Hochkofler
Scherwey (Untersander) – 22:40	2–1
Lasch (Scherwey, Berger) (PP) – 24:02	3–1
	3–2	26:55 – Raffl (Pallestrang, Duncan)
	3–3	35:34 – (SHG) Duncan (Cijan)

8 min
Penalties
27 min

SC Bern won 7–4 on Aggregate.

11 October 2016; 19:00	Linköpings HC (Sweden)	2–3 (0–2, 0–0, 2–1)	(Switzerland) HC Davos	Saab Arena, Linköping; Attendance: 1,042

Game reference

Marcus Högberg
Goalies
Gilles Senn

	0–1	5:18 – (SHG) Ambühl (Kousal)
	0–2	8:38 – Wieser
	0–3	46:19 – (PP) Kousal (Forster, Ambühl)
Bergfors (Lundgren, Näkyvä) – 49:58	1–3
Little (Näkyvä, Larsson) – 55:41	2–3

10 min
Penalties
6 min

Linköpings HC won 9–7 on Aggregate.

=== Round of 16 ===
The first legs were played on 1 November, and the second legs were played on 8 and 9 November 2016.

Team 1	Agg.	Team 2	1st leg	2nd leg
Bílí Tygři Liberec (Czech Republic)	2–3	(Czech Republic) Vítkovice Steel	1–0	1–3 (OT)
KalPa (Finland)	3–4	(Switzerland) Fribourg-Gottéron	1–1	2–3 (OT)
Eisbären Berlin (Germany)	2–10	(Sweden) Frölunda HC	1–6	1–4
Linköpings HC (Sweden)	2–1	(Finland) HIFK	1–1	1–0
HC Lugano (Switzerland)	5–6	(Switzerland) ZSC Lions	3–2	2–4 (OT)
SaiPa (Finland)	5–6	(Sweden) Växjö Lakers	3–2	2–4 (OT)
HC Sparta Praha (Czech Republic)	7–4	(Sweden) HV71	2–4	5–0
SC Bern (Switzerland)	6–5	(Finland) JYP	3–2	3–3

==== First Leg ====
1 November 2016; 17:00	Bílí Tygři Liberec (Czech Republic)	1–0 (0–0, 0–0, 1–0)	(Czech Republic) Vítkovice Steel	Home Credit Arena, Liberec; Attendance: 4,527

Game reference
Roman Will	Goalies	Daniel Dolejš
Bartovič (Šimek, Vlach) (SHG) – 56:26 / 1–0

1 November 2016; 17:00	KalPa (Finland)	1–1 (0–0, 1–0, 0–1)	(Switzerland) Fribourg-Gottéron	Data Group Areena, Kuopio; Attendance: 2,160

Game reference
Denis Godla	Goalies	Dennis Saikkonen
Mankinen (Riikola, Sebok) (PP) – 37:53 / 1–0; / 1–1 / 55:26 – Sprunger (Rathgeb, Mottet)

1 November 2016; 17:00	SaiPa (Finland)	3–2 (2–0, 0–0, 1–2)	(Sweden) Växjö Lakers	Kisapuisto, Lappeenranta; Attendance: 2,338

Game reference

Jussi Markkanen
Goalies
Joacim Eriksson

Trotter (Järvinen, Hamilton) – 0:22	1–0
Trotter (Hamilton) – 10:28	2–0
	2–1	41:26 – (PP) Fröberg (Rosén, Kiiskinen)
	2–2	53:50 – Netterberg (Brodecki, Bohm)
Leivo (Koski – 55:44	3–2

1 November 2016; 18:30	HC Sparta Praha (Czech Republic)	2–4 (0–1, 1–3, 1–0)	(Sweden) HV71	O2 Arena, Prague; Attendance: 3,618

Game reference

Filip Novotný
Goalies
Fredrik Pettersson Wentzel

	0–1	11:35 – Reese
	0–2	20:29 – Thörnberg (Arlbrandt, Almquist)
25:11 – Forman (Čajkovský)	1–2
	1–3	29:37 – Thörnberg (Stenlund)
	1–4	33:32 – Stenlund (Andersson)
Pech – 48:06	2–4

1 November 2016; 18:30	Eisbären Berlin (Germany)	1–6 (1–3, 0–1, 0–2)	(Sweden) Frölunda HC	Mercedes-Benz Arena, Berlin; Attendance: 4,552

Game reference

Petri Vehanen 9pulled at 48:19) Marvin Cupper
Goalies
Johan Gustafsson

	0–1	5:49 – Stålberg (Lasu, Rosseli Olsen)
	0–2	11:02 – (PP) Lundqvist (Wellman, Tömmernes)
Ziegler – 16:04	1–2
	1–3	18:06 – Wellman (Hjalmarsson, Lundqvist)
	1–4	27:36 – Lundqvist (Donovan, Wellman)
	1–5	45:56 – Ehn
	1–6	48:19 – Sundström (Tömmernes)

1 November 2016; 18:45	SC Bern (Switzerland)	3–2 (0–2, 3–0, 0–0)	(Finland) JYP	PostFinance Arena, Bern; Attendance: 13,660

Game reference

Leonardo Genoni
Goalies
Pekka Tuokkola

	0–1	2:14 – (PP) Suomela (Tuppurainen, Nattinen)
	0–2	4:54 – (PP) Niku (Hytönen, Tavi)
Lasch (Blum, Untersander) – 28:09	1–2
Moser (Rufenacht, Arcobello) – 28:40	2–2
Arcobello (Noreau, Ebbett) (PP) – 31:26	3–2

1 November 2016; 18:45	HC Lugano (Switzerland)	3–2 (1–2, 2–0, 0–0)	(Switzerland) ZSC Lions	Resega, Lugano; Attendance: 5,439

Game reference

Elvis Merzlikins
Goalies
Lukas Flüeler

	0–1	12:55 – Rundblad
	0–2	13:13 – Wick
Hofmann (Bürgler, Brunner) – 19:30	1–2
Chiesa (Wilson, Zackrisson) – 24:28	2–2
Klasen (Zackrisson) – 28:39	3–2

1 November 2016; 19:00	Linköpings HC (Sweden)	1–1 (1–0, 0–0, 0–1)	(Finland) HIFK	Saab Arena, Linköping; Attendance: 1,577

Game reference
Marcus Högberg	Goalies	Niklas Bäckström
Galló (Lundgren, Persson) – 2:28 / 1–0; / 1–1 / 46:55 – (PP) Leino (Elkins, Taimi)

==== Second Leg ====
8 November 2016; 16:00	Vítkovice Steel (Czech Republic)	3–1 (OT) (1–0, 0–0, 1–1) (OT 1–0)	(Czech Republic) Bílí Tygři Liberec	ČEZ Aréna, Ostrava; Attendance: 4,716

Game reference

Daniel Dolejš
Goalies
Roman Will

Szturc (Balán) (SHG) – 5:59	1–0
Szturc (Stastny) – 44:50	2–0
	2–1	58:27 – (EA) Bulíř (Jelínek, Šimek)
Tybor – 61:15	3–1

Vítkovice Steel won 3–2 on Aggregate in Overtime.

8 November 2016; 17:00	HIFK (Finland)	0–1 (0–1, 0–0, 0–0)	(Sweden) Linköpings HC	Helsingin Jäähalli, Helsinki; Attendance: 3,263

Game reference
Kevin Lankinen	Goalies	Marcus Högberg
Goals / 13:54 – (PP) Roe (Persson, Gordon)

Linköpings HC won 2–1 on Aggregate.

8 November 2016; 17:00	JYP (Finland)	3–3 (0–1, 0–0, 3–2)	(Switzerland) SC Bern	Synergia-areena, Jyväskylä; Attendance: 3,029

Game reference

Pekka Tuokkola
Goalies
Leonardo Genoni

	0–1	3:16 – Randegger (Plüss, Scherwey)
	0–2	41:19 – Lasch (Bodenmann)
Hytönen (Tavi, Niku) (PP) – 45:54	1–2
Salmio (Friman) – 48:26	2–2
	2–3	55:47 – Ebbett
Suomela (Vainio, Salmio) (EA) – 59:38	3–3

SC Bern won 6–5 on Aggregate.

8 November 2016; 18:00	Växjö Lakers (Sweden)	4–2 (OT) (0–1, 2–1, 1–0) (OT 1–0)	(Finland) SaiPa	Vida Arena, Växjö; Attendance: 1,254

Game reference

Viktor Andrén
Goalies
Jussi Markkanen

	0–1	7:55 – Leivo
Rosén (Holm, Palola) – 21:04	1–1
Palola (Rosén, Kiiskinen) – 27:34	2–1
	2–2	31:13 – (PP) Leivo (Lappalainen, Nagander)
Rosén (Leino – 56:13	3–2
Josefsson – 69:11	4–2

Växjö Lakers won 6–5 on Aggregate in Overtime.

8 November 2016; 18:30	HV71 (Sweden)	0–5 (0–1, 0–3, 0–1)	(Czech Republic) HC Sparta Praha	Kinnarps Arena, Jönköping; Attendance: 1,019

Game reference

Fredrik Pettersson Wentzel
Goalies
Filip Novotný

0–1	19:29 – Pech (Kumstát, Kudrna)
0–2	27:51 – Mikuš (Piskáček, Pech)
0–3	30:02 – Pech (Piskáček, Kudrna)
0–4	30:31 – Cingel (Barinka, Černoch)
0–5	57:02 – Kudrna

HC Sparta Praha won 7–4 on Aggregate.

8 November 2016; 18:45	Fribourg-Gottéron (Switzerland)	3–2 (OT) (1–1, 1–1, 0–0) (OT 1–0)	(Finland) KalPa	BCF Arena, Fribourg; Attendance: 3,032

Game reference

Benjamin Conz
Goalies
Severi Kinnunen

	0–1	7:24 – (PP) Myttynen (Lukka)
Mauldin (Mottet, Rathgeb) – 8:55	1–1
Birner (Sprunger) – 24:02	2–1
	2–2	34:05 – Jokinen (Sebok)
Rathgeb (Sprunger, Červenka – 61:20	3–2

HC Fribourg-Gottéron won 4–3 on Aggregate in Overtime.

8 November 2016; 19:00	Frölunda HC (Sweden)	4–1 (2–0, 0–0, 2–1)	(Germany) Eisbären Berlin	Frölundaborg, Gothenburg; Attendance: 1,702

Game reference

Dan Bakala
Goalies
Petri Vehanen (pulled at 30:51) Marvin Cupper

Grundström (Stålberg, Figren) – 1:29	1–0
Grundström (Donovan, Hjalmarsson) (PP) – 10:36	2–0
	2–1	50:44 – Gervais (Ziegler, Tallackson)
Rosseli Olsen (Grundström, Donovan) (PP) – 53:12	3–1
Olofsson (Larsson, Wellman) (PP) – 59:23	4–1

Frölunda HC won 10–2 on Aggregate.

9 November 2016; 18:45	ZSC Lions (Switzerland)	4–2 (OT) (2–1, 1–1, 0–0) (OT 1–0)	(Switzerland) HC Lugano	Hallenstadion, Zürich; Attendance: 3,567

Game reference

Lukas Flüeler
Goalies
Elvis Merzlikins

	0–1	5:39 – Reuille (Gardner)
Schappi (Trachsler, Künzle) – 14:58	1–1
Blindenbacher (Sjögren) – 15:45	2–1
Thoresen (Blindenbacher, Wick) (PP) – 29:17	3–1
	3–2	36:25 – Klasen (Martensson)
Wick (Blindenbacher) (PP) – 61:07	4–2

ZSC Lions won 6–5 on Aggregate in Overtime.

=== Quarter-finals ===
The first legs were played on 6 December, and the second legs were played on 13 December 2016.

Team 1	Agg.	Team 2	1st leg	2nd leg
Vítkovice Steel (Czech Republic)	4–8	(Switzerland) Fribourg-Gottéron	2–5	2–3
Frölunda HC (Sweden)	9–2	(Sweden) Linköpings HC	4–0	5–2
ZSC Lions (Switzerland)	2–3	(Sweden) Växjö Lakers	0–0	2–3
SC Bern (Switzerland)	2–5	(Czech Republic) HC Sparta Praha	1–1	1–4

==== First Leg ====
6 December 2016; 16:00	Vítkovice Steel (Czech Republic)	2–5 (1–1, 1–2, 0–2)	(Switzerland) Fribourg-Gottéron	ČEZ Aréna, Ostrava; Attendance: 5,548

Game reference

Daniel Dolejš
Goalies
Benjamin Conz

	0–1	8:23 – (PP) Rathgeb (Červenka)
Illes (Kovář) – 11:31	1–1
	1–2	32:39 – Schmutz (Leeger, Mottet)
	1–3	36:12 – Sprunger (Červenka, Rathgeb)
Baranka (Illes, Krenželok) – 39:59	2–3
	2–4	46:54 – (PP) Sprunger (Červenka, Birner)
	2–5	51:58 – Sprunger (Maret, Červenka)

6 December 2016; 18:45	ZSC Lions (Switzerland)	0–0 (0–0, 0–0, 0–0)	(Sweden) Växjö Lakers	Hallenstadion, Zürich; Attendance: 3,215

Game reference
Lukas Flüeler	Goalies	Joacim Eriksson

6 December 2016; 19:00	Frölunda HC (Sweden)	4–0 (0–0, 3–0, 1–0)	(Sweden) Linköpings HC	Frölundaborg, Gothenburg; Attendance: 1,227

Game reference

Dan Bakala
Goalies
Jacob Johansson

Sundström (Lundqvist, Olofsson) (PP) – 20:40	1–0
Hjalmarsson – 26:51	2–0
Olofsson (Tömmernes, Lundqvist) (PP) – 39:37	3–0
Figren (Grundström, Hjalmarsson) (PP) – 43:44	4–0

7 December 2016; 18:45	SC Bern (Switzerland)	1–1 (0–0, 1–1, 0–0)	(Czech Republic) HC Sparta Praha	PostFinance Arena, Bern; Attendance: 14,567

Game reference
Leonardo Genoni	Goalies	Tomáš Pöpperle
/ 0–1 / 24:25 – Hlinka (Mikuš); Untersander (Arcobello, Rufenacht) – 26:52 / 1–1

==== Second Leg ====
13 December 2016; 17:30	HC Sparta Praha (Czech Republic)	4–1 (0–0, 3–1, 1–0)	(Switzerland) SC Bern	O2 Arena, Prague; Attendance: 6,073

Game reference

Tomáš Pöpperle
Goalies
Leonardo Genoni

Mikuš (Vrána) (PP) – 30:50	1–0
	1–1	31:29 – Scherwey (Hischier, Plüss)
Forman (Kumstát, Pech) – 35:28	2–1
Pech (Hlinka, Vrána) (PP, 5 ON 3) – 37:59	3–1
Kumstát (Pech) (SHG) – 48:40	4–1

HC Sparta Praha won 5–2 on Aggregate.

13 December 2016; 18:00	Växjö Lakers (Sweden)	3–2 (0–2, 2–0, 1–0)	(Switzerland) ZSC Lions	Vida Arena, Växjö; Attendance: 1,502

Game reference

Joacim Eriksson
Goalies
Lukas Flüeler

	0–1	10:34 – Geering (Blindenbacher, Nilsson)
	0–2	17:19 – (PP) Nilsson (Wick, Rundblad)
Rosén (Leino, Netterberg) (PP) – 32:51	1–2
Rosén (Holm, Wistén) – 37:40	2–2
Rosén (Murphy, Rosén) (PP) – 56:40	3–2

Växjö Lakers won 3–2 on Aggregate.

13 December 2016; 18:45	Fribourg-Gottéron (Switzerland)	3–2 (2–1, 1–0, 0–1)	(Czech Republic) Vítkovice Steel	BCF Arena, Fribourg; Attendance: 3,780

Game reference

Benjamin Conz
Goalies
Patrik Bartošák

Bykov (Sprunger, Birner) – 16:12	1–0
	1–1	16:42 – Stastny (Zdráhal, Puzič)
Rathgeb (Bykov, Birner) – 19:40	2–1
Mauldin (Sprunger, Bykov) (PP) – 24:50	3–1
	3–2	50:19 – Němec (Kafka)

HC Fribourg-Gottéron won 8–4 on Aggregate.

13 December 2016; 19:00	Linköpings HC (Sweden)	2–5 (1–1, 1–3, 0–1)	(Sweden) Frölunda HC	Saab Arena, Linköping; Attendance: 1,128

Game reference

Jacob Johansson
Goalies
Johan Gustafsson

	0–1	14:16 – (PP) Olofsson (Lundqvist, Wellman)
Lilja (Olimb, Leuvenius) – 17:26	1–1
	1–2	22:49 – Sundström (Lundqvist)
Persson (Little, Salmela) (PP, 5 ON 3) – 31:29	2–2
	2–3	35:19 – (PP) Olofsson (Tömmernes, Wellman)
	2–4	39:57 – Bergenheim (Olsen, Lasu)
	2–5	50:05 – (PP, 5 ON 3) Wellman (Lundqvist, Olofsson)

Frölunda HC won 9–2 on Aggregate.

=== Semi-finals ===
The first legs were played on 10 January, and the second legs were played on 17 January 2017.

Team 1	Agg.	Team 2	1st leg	2nd leg
Frölunda HC (Sweden)	9–1	(Switzerland) Fribourg-Gottéron	5–1	4–0
Växjö Lakers (Sweden)	1–6	(Czech Republic) HC Sparta Praha	1–2	0–4

==== First Leg ====
10 January 2017; 19:00	Frölunda HC (Sweden)	5–1 (1–1, 2–0, 2–0)	(Switzerland) Fribourg-Gottéron	Frölundaborg, Gothenburg; Attendance: 4,042

Game reference

Johan Gustafsson
Goalies
Benjamin Conz

Nyberg (Donovan, Lundqvist) 12:57	1–0
	1–1	14:02 – Neuenschwander (Stadler, Leeger)
Rosseli Olsen (Stålberg, Nørstebø) – 26:54	2–1
Tömmernes – 29:28	3–1
Rosseli Olsen (Lasu, Stålberg) – 40:19	4–1
Larsson (Rosseli Olsen, Stålberg) – 43:13	5–1

10 January 2017; 20:00	Växjö Lakers (Sweden)	1–2 (0–2, 0–0, 1–0)	(Czech Republic) HC Sparta Praha	Vida Arena, Växjö; Attendance: 1,347

Game reference

Viktor Andrén
Goalies
Tomáš Pöpperle

	0–1	1:16 – Gernát (Netík, Forman)
	0–2	12:50 – Kudrna (Cingel, Kumstát)
Hennessy – 54:38	1–2

==== Second Leg ====
17 January 2017; 18:30	HC Sparta Praha (Czech Republic)	4–0 (1–0, 1–0, 2–0)	(Sweden) Växjö Lakers	O2 Arena, Prague; Attendance: 12,136

Game reference

Tomáš Pöpperle
Goalies
Joacim Eriksson
Referees:
(Switzerland) Tobias Wehrli
(United States) Mark Lemelin
Linesmen:
(Czech Republic) Jiri Ondráček
(Czech Republic) Josef Spur

Klimek (Kalina, Hlinka) – 16:35	1–0
Barinka (Uher) – 30:33	2–0
Hlinka (Pech, Klimek) (PP) – 56:47	3–0
Vrána (Klimek, Hlinka) – 58:53	4–0

HC Sparta Praha won 6–1 on Aggregate.

17 January 2017; 20:15	Fribourg-Gottéron (Switzerland)	0–4 (0–1, 0–2, 0–1)	(Sweden) Frölunda HC	BCF Arena, Fribourg; Attendance: 3,024

Game reference

Benjamin Conz
Goalies
Johan Gustafsson

0–1	12:39 – Bergenheim (Ehn, Olofsson)
0–2	20:48 – (PP) Tömmernes
0–3	38:44 – Figren (Bergenheim)
0–4	41:24 – Grundström (Larsson)

Frölunda HC won 9–1 on Aggregate.

=== Final ===
The final was played on 7 February 2017.

7 February 2017; 19:05	Frölunda HC (Sweden)	4–3 OT (2–2, 1–0, 0–1) (OT 1–0)	(Czech Republic) HC Sparta Praha	Frolundaborgs Isstadion, Gothenburg; Attendance: 6,044

Game reference

Johan Gustafsson
Goalies
Tomáš Pöpperle
Referees:
(Finland) Stefan Fonselius
(Finland) Mikko Kaukokari
Linesmen:
(Switzerland) Roman Kaderli
(Switzerland) Balazs Kovacs

	0–1	02:30 – Cingeľ (Kalina, Kudrna)
Wellman (Sundström, Tömmernes) (PP) – 07:46	1–1
	1–2	10:42 – Vrána (Hlinka) (SH)
Lundqvist (Tömmernes, Olofsson) (PP) – 12:06	2–2
Wellman (Olofsson, Donovan) – 27:27	3–2
	3–3	46:15 – Klimek (Švrček, Pech)
Lasu (Rosseli Olsen, Donovan) – 61:27	4–3

4 min
Penalties
41 min
35
Shots
36

== Statistics ==
=== Home Game and Overall ===
As of 7 February 2017

Pos.	Team	Regular season		Playoffs		Overall			2015–16 average
Pos.	Team	Matches	Attendance	Matches	Attendance	Matches	Total	Average	2015–16 average
1	(Switzerland) SC Bern	2	6,845	3	41,896	5	48,741	9,748	5,995
2	(Germany) Adler Mannheim	2	14,707	0	—	2	14,707	7,354	7,511
3	(Poland) ComArch Cracovia	2	13,333	0	—	2	13,333	6,667	—
4	(Belarus) Yunost Minsk	2	13,470	1	5,500	3	18,970	6,323	—
5	(Germany) Eisbären Berlin	2	12,533	2	9,274	4	21,807	5,452	5,211
6	(Switzerland) HC Lugano	2	9,992	2	10,202	4	20,194	5,049	–
7	(Czech Republic) HC Sparta Praha	2	5,442	4	24,115	6	29,557	4,926	2,213
8	(Austria) Black Wings Linz	2	9,250	0	—	2	9,250	4,625	4,300
9	(United Kingdom) Sheffield Steelers	2	8,649	0	—	2	8,649	4,325	4,049
10	(Czech Republic) Vítkovice Steel	2	4,185	3	14,479	5	18,664	3,733	3,612
11	(Finland) Kärpät	2	8,343	1	2,392	3	10,735	3,578	4,447
12	(Switzerland) EV Zug	2	5,860	1	4,692	3	10,552	3,517	3,389
13	(Finland) Tappara	2	6,893	1	3,478	3	10,371	3,457	3,349
14	(Czech Republic) Bílí Tygři Liberec	2	5,354	2	8,372	4	13,726	3,432	3,410
15	(Finland) HIFK	2	7,006	2	6,461	4	13,467	3,367	3,818
16	(Slovakia) HC Košice	2	5,365	1	4,446	3	9,811	3,270	4,949
17	(Switzerland) ZSC Lions	2	5,524	3	9,849	5	15,373	3,075	2,791
18	(Switzerland) HC Fribourg-Gottéron	2	6,767	4	11,446	6	18,213	3,036	2,739
19	(Switzerland) HC Davos	2	5,874	1	3,087	3	8,961	2,987	4,216
20	(Finland) JYP	2	6,752	2	4,735	4	11,487	2,872	2,453
21	(Finland) Lukko	2	5,950	1	2,494	3	8,444	2,815	2,469
22	(Czech Republic) Dynamo Pardubice	2	5,623	0	—	2	5,623	2,812	3,074
23	(Czech Republic) Orli Znojmo	2	5,554	0	—	2	5,554	2,777	—
24	(Sweden) Luleå HF	2	5,490	0	—	2	5,490	2,745	3,949
25	(Czech Republic) HC Plzeň	2	5,992	1	2,065	3	8,057	2,686	-
26	(Sweden) Färjestad BK	2	5,885	1	1,832	3	7,717	2,572	2,566
27	(Sweden) Frölunda HC	2	3,868	5	14,057	7	17,925	2,561	2,214
28	(Norway) Stavanger Oilers	2	5,122	0	–	2	5,122	2,561	3,186
29	(Germany) Red Bull Munich	2	5,230	1	2,090	3	7,320	2,440	2,762
30	(Finland) SaiPa	2	4,389	2	4,263	4	9,652	2,413	—
31	(Slovakia) HK Nitra	2	5,452	1	1,679	3	7,131	2,377	2,524
32	(Austria) Red Bull Salzburg	2	5,189	1	1,814	3	7,003	2,334	1,436
33	(France) Dragons de Rouen	2	4,650	0	—	2	4,650	2,325	—
34	(Germany) Krefeld Pinguine	2	4,622	0	—	2	4,622	2,311	3,231
35	(Austria) Vienna Capitals	2	4,550	0	—	2	4,550	2,275	3,100
36	(Finland) KalPa	2	4,551	2	4,203	4	8,754	2,189	2,261
37	(Germany) ERC Ingolstadt	2	4,157	0	–	2	6,647	2,079	2,216
38	(Germany) Grizzlys Wolfsburg	2	4,476	1	1,697	3	6,173	2,058	—
39	(Sweden) Djurgårdens IF	2	5,136	1	756	3	5,892	1,964	1,550
40	(Sweden) Skellefteå AIK	2	4,321	1	1,543	3	5,864	1,955	2,504
41	(Sweden) Växjö Lakers	2	5,483	4	5,687	6	11,170	1,862	2,278
42	(France) Rapaces de Gap	2	3,516	0	—	2	3,516	1,758	2,531
43	(Czech Republic) BK Mladá Boleslav	2	3,424	0	–	2	3,424	1,712	—
44	(Sweden) Linköpings HC	2	4,705	3	3,747	5	8,452	1,690	2,443
45	(Finland) TPS	2	3,363	1	1,658	3	5,021	1,674	3,792
46	(Sweden) HV71	2	4,806	2	1,691	4	6,497	1,624	1,796
47	(Denmark) Esbjerg Energy	2	2,679	0	—	2	2,679	1,340	–
48	(Norway) Lørenskog IK	2	1,597	0	–	2	1,597	799	—
Tournament total		96	291,924	61	215,700	157	507,624	3,233	3,252

Source: Champions Hockey League.
