= Juraj Mikúš =

Juraj Mikúš may refer to the following:

- Juraj Mikúš (ice hockey, born 1987), Slovak ice hockey centre
- Juraj Mikuš (ice hockey, born 1988), Slovak ice hockey defenceman
