= Adam Brodecki =

Adam Brodecki may refer to:

- Adam Brodecki (figure skater)
- Adam Brodecki (ice hockey)
