= Jacob Larsson =

Swedish ice hockey player (born 1997)

- Born: April 29, 1997 (age 29) Ljungby, Sweden
- Height: 6 ft 2 in (188 cm)
- Weight: 193 lb (88 kg; 13 st 11 lb)
- Position: Defence
- Shoots: Left
- NL team Former teams: SC Rapperswil-Jona Lakers; Frölunda HC; Anaheim Ducks; Ottawa Senators
- National team: Sweden
- NHL draft: 27th overall, 2015; Anaheim Ducks
- Playing career: 2014–present

Jacob Larsson (born 29 April 1997) is a Swedish professional ice hockey player who is a defenceman for SC Rapperswil-Jona Lakers of the National League (NL). He was selected by the Anaheim Ducks of the National Hockey League (NHL) 27th overall in the 2015 NHL entry draft. He has also played for the Ottawa Senators in the NHL and Frölunda HC of the Swedish Hockey League.

== Playing career ==
Larsson split the 2014–15 season between Frölunda HC's professional and junior teams. At season's end, he was the third-ranked international skater in the NHL Central Scouting Bureau's final rankings. At the 2015 NHL entry draft, Larsson was selected in the first round, 27th overall, by the Anaheim Ducks.

He returned to Frölunda for the 2015–16 season. In 47 games, Larsson recorded 5 goals and 9 assists for 14 points. He had 3 assists in 16 postseason games as Frölunda captured the Le Mat Trophy. Additionally, the team also won the Champions Hockey League (CHL) Championship, where Larsson contributed 5 points in 13 games. On 28 April 2016, he signed an amateur try-out with the Ducks' American Hockey League (AHL) affiliate, the San Diego Gulls. He appeared in one playoff game for the club.

On 20 May 2016, the Ducks signed Larsson to a three-year, entry-level contract. He made his NHL debut on 13 October 2016, going scoreless in a 4–2 loss to the Dallas Stars. On 22 October, the Ducks assigned Larsson to the Gulls after four games. On 3 November, the Ducks reassigned Larsson to Frölunda. The team once again won the CHL Championship. Larsson returned to North America for the 2017–18 season after undergoing knee surgery. He played the entire season for the Gulls in an effort to get back up to speed. He recorded 16 points in 50 games.

On 7 November 2018, Larsson recorded his first career NHL point (an assist) in a 3–2 win over the Calgary Flames. He split the 2018–19 season between the Ducks and Gulls, primarily skating with Anaheim. With Anaheim he was forced into a top four role after injuries depleted the defence corps. At the end of the Ducks season, he was sent back to San Diego to take part in their playoff run, playing well. In the following 2019–20 season, on 5 November 2019, Larsson scored his first career NHL goal in a 4–2 loss to the Minnesota Wild. He finished with 2 goals and 9 assists for 11 points in 60 games before the regular season was halted due to the COVID-19 pandemic.

On 6 August 2020, the Ducks signed Larsson to a two-year contract extension. With the 2020–21 North American season delayed due to the pandemic, Larsson in order to recommence playing signed on loan with Allsvenskan club, Kristianstads IK, on 23 October 2020.

On 14 July 2022, having left the Ducks as an unrestricted free agent following six seasons, Larsson was signed to a one-year, two-way contract with the Ottawa Senators. Larsson began the season with Ottawa's AHL affiliate, the Belleville Senators. He was recalled on 8 November and saw his first game action with Ottawa on 15 November, replacing an injured Thomas Chabot. He was sent back to Belleville on 17 November. He finished the season with seven games played in the NHL and four goals and 13 assists in 57 games with Belleville. On 29 June 2023 Larsson signed a one-year two-way contract extension with the Senators.

Larsson attended Ottawa's 2023 training camp but failed to make the team. He was placed on waivers and after going unclaimed, was assigned to Belleville to start the 2023–24 season. He spent the entire year with Belleville aside from joining Ottawa during their short series in Sweden, helping the AHL Senators to the second round of the Calder Cup playoffs for the first time in team history.

After his contract with Ottawa expired at the end of the 2023–24 season, Larsson signed a two-year contract with the SC Rapperswil-Jona Lakers of the National League in late May 2024. In his first season with the Lakers in 2024–25, Larsson saw limited action, suffering a sequence of injuries; first an injury to his leg in September, followed by a more serious rib injury in November that sidelined him for six months. He signed a two-year extension in November 2025.

== Career statistics ==
=== Regular season and playoffs ===
			Regular season					Playoffs
Season	Team	League	GP	G	A	Pts	PIM	GP	G	A	Pts	PIM
2012–13	IF Troja/Ljungby	J18	10	0	0	0	0	2	0	1	1	2
2012–13	IF Troja/Ljungby	SWE.2 U20	19	5	5	10	2	—	—	—	—	—
2013–14	Frölunda HC	J18	21	5	8	13	49	—	—	—	—	—
2013–14	Frölunda HC	J18 Allsv	17	4	8	12	6	5	2	4	6	8
2013–14	Frölunda HC	J20	13	0	0	0	0	3	0	0	0	0
2014–15	Frölunda HC	J18	1	0	0	0	0	—	—	—	—	—
2014–15	Frölunda HC	J18 Allsv	2	1	1	2	0	2	0	1	1	0
2014–15	Frölunda HC	J20	30	8	11	19	49	8	0	4	4	6
2014–15	Frölunda HC	SHL	20	1	2	3	6	—	—	—	—	—
2015–16	Frölunda HC	J20	1	0	0	0	0	—	—	—	—	—
2015–16	Frölunda HC	SHL	47	5	9	14	10	16	0	3	3	0
2015–16	San Diego Gulls	AHL	—	—	—	—	—	1	0	0	0	0
2016–17	Anaheim Ducks	NHL	4	0	0	0	2	—	—	—	—	—
2016–17	San Diego Gulls	AHL	4	0	2	2	2	—	—	—	—	—
2016–17	Frölunda HC	SHL	29	1	4	5	16	7	1	2	3	0
2017–18	San Diego Gulls	AHL	50	3	13	16	20	—	—	—	—	—
2018–19	San Diego Gulls	AHL	22	0	5	5	10	16	2	5	7	4
2018–19	Anaheim Ducks	NHL	49	0	5	5	16	—	—	—	—	—
2019–20	Anaheim Ducks	NHL	60	2	9	11	12	—	—	—	—	—
2019–20	San Diego Gulls	AHL	5	1	1	2	4	—	—	—	—	—
2020–21	Kristianstads IK	Allsv	5	0	2	2	4	—	—	—	—	—
2020–21	Anaheim Ducks	NHL	46	1	6	7	14	—	—	—	—	—
2021–22	San Diego Gulls	AHL	55	2	13	15	41	2	0	0	0	0
2021–22	Anaheim Ducks	NHL	6	0	1	1	2	—	—	—	—	—
2022–23	Belleville Senators	AHL	55	4	13	17	51	—	—	—	—	—
2022–23	Ottawa Senators	NHL	7	0	0	0	6	—	—	—	—	—
2023–24	Belleville Senators	AHL	61	7	26	33	46	7	0	5	5	4
2024–25	SC Rapperswil-Jona Lakers	NL	6	0	2	2	31	—	—	—	—	—
2025–26	SC Rapperswil-Jona Lakers	NL	50	12	22	34	32	9	0	2	2	24
SHL totals			96	7	15	22	32	23	1	5	6	0
NHL totals			172	3	21	24	52	—	—	—	—	—

=== International ===
Year	Team	Event	Result	GP	G	A	Pts	PIM
2014	Sweden	U17	6th	5	0	0	0	4
2014	Sweden	IH18	4th	5	0	1	1	2
2015	Sweden	WJC18	8th	5	0	3	3	0
2016	Sweden	WJC	4th	6	1	2	3	4
2017	Sweden	WJC	4th	7	0	1	1	4
2026	Sweden	WC	7th	8	1	1	2	2
Junior totals				28	1	7	8	14
Senior totals				8	1	1	2	2

== Awards and honors ==
Award	Year	Ref
SHL
Le Mat Trophy champion	2016	
CHL
Champion	2016, 2017	

Awards and achievements
Preceded by Nick Ritchie	Anaheim Ducks first-round draft pick 2015	Succeeded by Max Jones
