= Johan Sundström =

Swedish ice hockey player

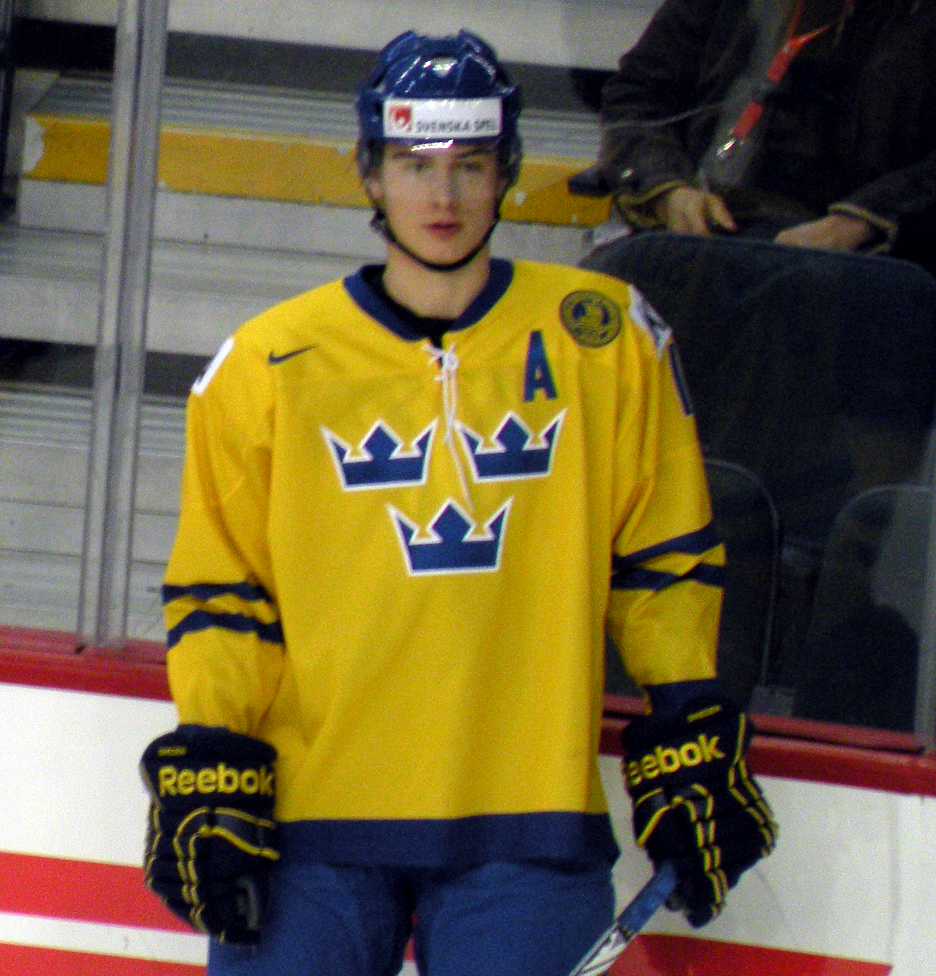
- Sundström with Sweden in 2012
- Born: September 21, 1992 (age 33) Gothenburg, Sweden
- Height: 6 ft 2 in (188 cm)
- Weight: 196 lb (89 kg; 14 st 0 lb)
- Position: Centre
- Shoots: Right
- SHL team Former teams: Frölunda HC; New York Islanders; Avangard Omsk; Kunlun Red Star
- National team: Sweden
- NHL draft: 50th overall, 2011; New York Islanders
- Playing career: 2010–present

Johan William Sundström (born September 21, 1992) is a Swedish ice hockey player who is currently playing professionally with Frölunda HC in the Swedish Hockey League (SHL).

== Playing career ==
Sundström originally signed a two-year contract with Frölunda in September 2010. He scored his first Elitserien goal on December 4, 2010, against Andreas Andersson of HV71. Ultimately, Sundström played 41 games out of the 55 regular season games. He joined Frölunda's J20 team for the J20 playoffs. His team went on to the final, where they won 6–3 against Skellefteå AIK. He was drafted by the New York Islanders in the second round, 50th overall, in the 2011 NHL entry draft.

After completing his three-year entry-level contract with the Islanders and featuring in only 11 NHL games in that span, Sundström opted to return to Frölunda as a restricted free agent from the Islanders on a two-year contract on June 12, 2015.

On May 25, 2017, Sundström left Frölunda for a second time, signing a two-year contract with Russian club, Avangard Omsk of the KHL. In the 2017–18 season, he was hampered by injury as he was limited to 5 regular season games for 1 point. He regained his health for the post-season, contributing with 2 goals in 7 games.

As a free agent from Omsk, Sundström opted to continue in the KHL, securing a one-year contract with Chinese outfit, Kunlun Red Star, on September 9, 2018. In the 2018–19 season, Sundström was limited to just 26 games through injury, curtailing his year in producing just 1 goal and 8 points.

After two seasons abroad, Sundström opted to return home to Sweden signing a four-year contract with original club, Frölunda HC, on 10 May 2019.

== Career statistics ==
=== Regular season and playoffs ===
| | | | Regular season | | | | | Playoffs |
| Season | Team | League | GP | G | A | Pts | PIM | GP | G | A | Pts | PIM |
|---|---|---|---|---|---|---|---|---|---|---|---|---|
| 2009–10 | Frölunda HC | J20 | 37 | 13 | 17 | 30 | 14 | 1 | 0 | 0 | 0 | 0 |
| 2009–10 | Frölunda HC | SEL | 1 | 0 | 0 | 0 | 0 | — | — | — | — | — |
| 2010–11 | Borås HC | Allsv | 1 | 0 | 0 | 0 | 0 | — | — | — | — | — |
| 2010–11 | Frölunda HC | J20 | 15 | 10 | 9 | 19 | 4 | 7 | 8 | 7 | 15 | 2 |
| 2010–11 | Frölunda HC | SEL | 41 | 1 | 0 | 1 | 10 | — | — | — | — | — |
| 2011–12 | Frölunda HC | SEL | 49 | 6 | 5 | 11 | 8 | 6 | 0 | 0 | 0 | 2 |
| 2012–13 | Bridgeport Sound Tigers | AHL | 59 | 11 | 21 | 32 | 30 | — | — | — | — | — |
| 2013–14 | Bridgeport Sound Tigers | AHL | 40 | 8 | 10 | 18 | 41 | — | — | — | — | — |
| 2013–14 | New York Islanders | NHL | 11 | 0 | 1 | 1 | 6 | — | — | — | — | — |
| 2014–15 | Bridgeport Sound Tigers | AHL | 72 | 7 | 12 | 19 | 81 | — | — | — | — | — |
| 2015–16 | Frölunda HC | SHL | 51 | 17 | 19 | 36 | 16 | 16 | 3 | 6 | 9 | 14 |
| 2016–17 | Frölunda HC | SHL | 45 | 12 | 26 | 38 | 16 | 9 | 1 | 0 | 1 | 18 |
| 2017–18 | Avangard Omsk | KHL | 5 | 0 | 1 | 1 | 2 | 7 | 2 | 1 | 3 | 8 |
| 2018–19 | Kunlun Red Star | KHL | 26 | 1 | 7 | 8 | 37 | — | — | — | — | — |
| 2019–20 | Frölunda HC | SHL | 51 | 13 | 18 | 31 | 20 | — | — | — | — | — |
| 2020–21 | Frölunda HC | SHL | 35 | 5 | 12 | 17 | 45 | 7 | 1 | 1 | 2 | 2 |
| 2021–22 | Frölunda HC | SHL | 49 | 6 | 9 | 15 | 16 | 3 | 0 | 0 | 0 | 0 |
| SHL totals | | | 322 | 60 | 89 | 149 | 131 | 41 | 5 | 7 | 12 | 36 |
| NHL totals | | | 11 | 0 | 1 | 1 | 6 | — | — | — | — | — |

Medal record

Representing Sweden

Ice hockey

World Junior Championships
| Gold medal – first place | 2012 Calgary | |

=== International ===
| Year | Team | Event | Result | GP | G | A | Pts | PIM |
|---|---|---|---|---|---|---|---|---|
| 2011 | Sweden | WJC | 4th | 6 | 0 | 1 | 1 | 0 |
| 2012 | Sweden | WJC | 1st place, gold medalist(s) | 6 | 1 | 4 | 5 | 2 |
| 2016 | Sweden | WC | 6th | 7 | 1 | 1 | 2 | 6 |
| Junior totals | | | | 12 | 1 | 5 | 6 | 2 |
| Senior totals | | | | 7 | 1 | 1 | 2 | 6 |

== Awards and honors ==
| Award | Year |
|---|---|
SHL
| Le Mat trophy (Frölunda HC) | 2016 |
| Stefan Liv Memorial Trophy | 2016 |
CHL
| Champions (Frölunda HC) | 2016, 2017 |
