= Sebastian Stålberg =

Swedish professional ice hockey Forward (born 1990)

Sebastian Ståhlberg
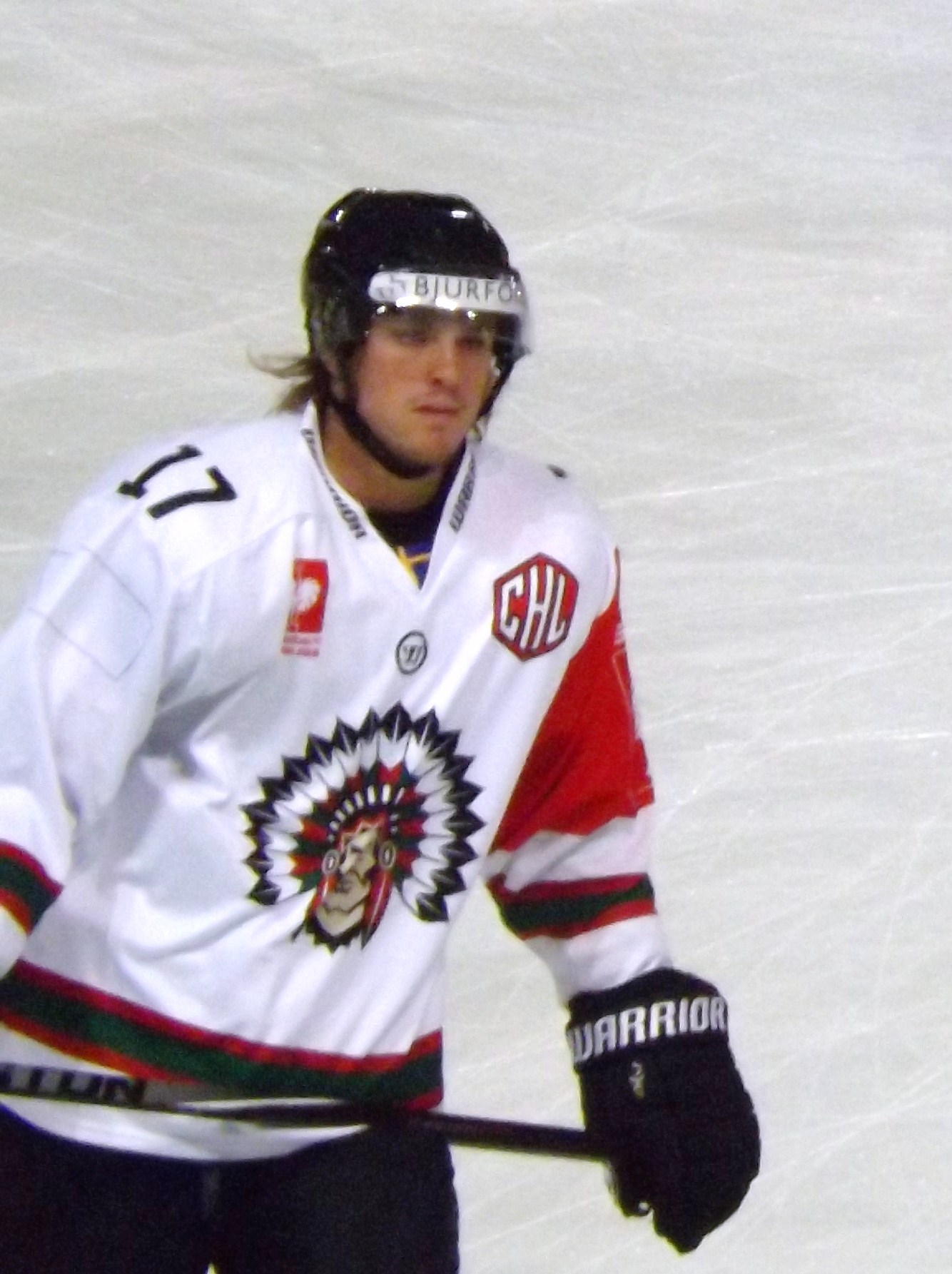
- Born: March 6, 1990 (age 35); Lerum, Sweden
- Height: 6 ft 1 in (185 cm)
- Weight: 185 lb (84 kg; 13 st 3 lb)
- Position: Forward
- Shoots: Right
- Liiga team Former teams: Vaasan Sport; Worcester Sharks; Portland Pirates; Frölunda HC
- NHL draft: Undrafted
- Playing career: 2012–present

Sebastian Stålberg (born March 6, 1990) is a Swedish professional ice hockey Forward. He is currently playing with Vaasan Sport in the Finnish Liiga.

Stålberg made his Swedish Hockey League debut playing with Frölunda HC during the 2014–15 SHL season. He is the younger brother to Viktor who plays in the National Hockey League (NHL) with the Ottawa Senators.

== Awards and honors ==
Award	Year
College
HE All-Rookie Team	2010
HE All-Academic Team	2011
SHL
Le Mat trophy (Frölunda HC)	2016, 2019
CHL
Champions (Frölunda HC)	2016, 2017, 2019
