= Jakub Illéš =

Czech ice hockey centre

- Born: 15 December 1995 (age 30) Ostrava, Czech Republic
- Height: 6 ft 2 in (188 cm)
- Weight: 198 lb (90 kg; 14 st 2 lb)
- Position: Centre
- Shoots: Left
- Czech2 team Former teams: HC Dukla Jihlava; HC Vítkovice; Aigles de Nice
- Playing career: 2015–present

Jakub Illéš (born 15 December 1995) is a Czech professional ice hockey centre playing for HC Dukla Jihlava of the Chance Liga.

Illéš previously played 35 games for HC Vítkovice of the Czech Extraliga between 2015 and 2017. On 24 May 2019, Illéš moved to Aigles de Nice of the Ligue Magnus in France. He would leave the team in December however after 18 games without scoring a goal and returned to the Czech Republic with HC Dukla Jihlava of the Chance Liga.
