= Lukáš Pech =

Czech ice hockey player

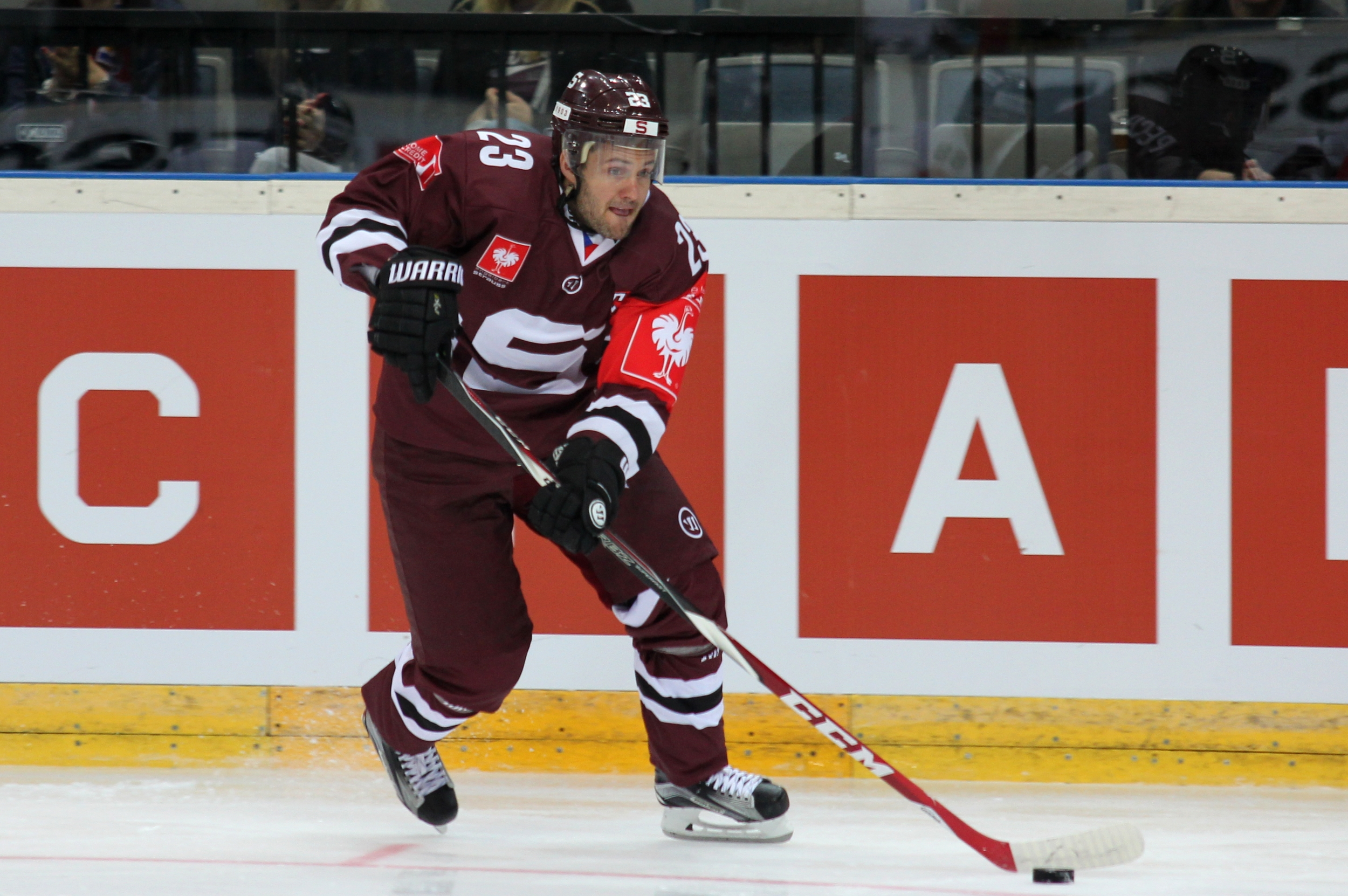
- Born: September 19, 1983 (age 42) Jihlava, Czechoslovakia
- Height: 5 ft 8 in (173 cm)
- Weight: 172 lb (78 kg; 12 st 4 lb)
- Position: Forward
- Shoots: Left
- Czech.1 team Former teams: HC Tábor; HC Karlovy Vary; HC Sparta Praha; Motor České Budějovice
- Playing career: 2002–present

Lukáš Pech (born September 19, 1983) is a Czech professional ice hockey forward currently playing with HC Tábor of the 1st Czech Republic Hockey League (Czech.1). He has formerly played with HC Karlovy Vary in the Czech Extraliga during the 2010–11 Czech Extraliga season and later with HC Sparta Praha and Motor České Budějovice
