= Miika Heikkilä =

Finnish ice hockey player

- Born: 7 February 1992 (age 33); Loppi, Finland
- Height: 6 ft 2 in (188 cm)
- Weight: 172 lb (78 kg; 12 st 4 lb)
- Position: Forward
- Shoots: Right
- Liiga team Former teams: Tappara; Lahti Pelicans
- NHL draft: Undrafted
- Playing career: 2013–present

Miika Heikkilä (born 7 February 1992) is a Finnish ice hockey player. He is currently playing with Tappara in the Finnish Liiga.

Heikkilä made his Liiga debut playing with Lahti Pelicans during the 2014–15 Liiga season.
