= Niclas Lundgren =

Swedish ice hockey player (born 1989)

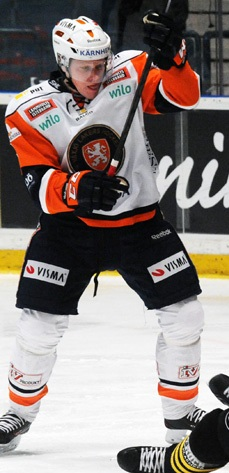
- Born: October 15, 1989 (age 36) Västerås, Sweden
- Height: 6 ft 0 in (183 cm)
- Weight: 198 lb (90 kg; 14 st 2 lb)
- Position: Defence
- Shoots: Left
- SHL team Former teams: Free Agent; Växjö Lakers; Linköpings HC; Brynäs IF; Malmö Redhawks
- Playing career: 2008–present

Niclas Lundgren (born October 15, 1989) is a Swedish ice hockey defenceman. He is currently an unrestricted free agent who most recently played with the Växjö Lakers of the Swedish Hockey League (SHL).

Lundgren made his Swedish Hockey League debut playing with Växjö Lakers during the 2012–13 SHL season.
