= Erik Andersson (ice hockey, born 1986) =

Swedish ice hockey player

- Born: 18 September 1986 (age 39) Ljungby, SWE
- Height: 5 ft 11.5 in (182 cm)
- Weight: 185 lb (84 kg; 13 st 3 lb)
- Position: Centre
- Shot: Left
- Played for: IF Troja/Ljungby; HV71 (SEL); Rögle BK; Timrå IK (SEL); IF Sundsvall Hockey; IF Björklöven; Borås HC
- Playing career: 2003–2013

Erik Andersson (born 18 September 1986 in Ljungby, Sweden) is a forward for the Borås HC hockey team in the Swedish HockeyAllsvenskan league.

== Playing career ==
On 28 October 2005 Andersson was named the first in the line of four candidates for Elitserien Rookie Of The Year 2006. The award was eventually won by forward Nicklas Bäckström.

After playing two seasons for HV71, Andersson signed with Timrå IK for 2 years on 10 April 2007. Andersson left on 7 May 2009 Timrå IK and signed with HockeyAllsvenskan club Borås HC.

== Awards and achievements ==
- Elitserien 2005-06 Rookie of the Year Nominee in 2005.

== Career statistics ==
			Regular season					Playoffs
Season	Team	League	GP	G	A	Pts	PIM	GP	G	A	Pts	PIM
2001–02	IF Troja-Ljungby J18		—	—	—	—	—	—	—	—	—	—
2002–03	IF Troja-Ljungby J18	J18 Div.2	—	—	—	—	—	—	—	—	—	—
2002–03	IF Troja-Ljungby J20	J20 Elit	24	14	16	30	63	—	—	—	—	—
2002–03	IF Troja-Ljungby	Allsvenskan	1	0	0	0	0	—	—	—	—	—
2003–04	IF Troja-Ljungby	Allsvenskan	37	2	0	2	51	—	—	—	—	—
2004–05	IF Troja-Ljungby	Allsvenskan	39	10	7	17	20	—	—	—	—	—
2005–06	HV71 J20	J20 SuperElit	3	2	5	7	2	—	—	—	—	—
2005–06	HV71	Elitserien	41	6	10	16	12	12	0	2	2	8
2006–07	HV71 J20	J20 SuperElit	1	0	3	3	0	—	—	—	—	—
2006–07	HV71	Elitserien	31	0	9	9	14	—	—	—	—	—
2006–07	Rögle BK	HockeyAllsvenskan	1	1	1	2	4	—	—	—	—	—
2007–08	Timrå IK	Elitserien	29	0	1	1	8	—	—	—	—	—
2007–08	IF Sundsvall Hockey	HockeyAllsvenskan	7	2	7	9	14	—	—	—	—	—
2008–09	Timrå IK	Elitserien	17	0	0	0	10	—	—	—	—	—
2008–09	IF Björklöven	HockeyAllsvenskan	15	2	1	3	12	—	—	—	—	—
2009–10	Borås HC	HockeyAllsvenskan	42	7	21	28	38	—	—	—	—	—
2009–10	Frölunda HC	Elitserien	4	0	0	0	0	—	—	—	—	—
2010–11	Borås HC	HockeyAllsvenskan	52	12	16	28	49	—	—	—	—	—
2011–12	Borås HC	HockeyAllsvenskan	35	7	11	18	18	—	—	—	—	—
2012–13	Borås HC	Hockeyettan	42	14	25	39	32	—	—	—	—	—
Elitserien totals			122	6	20	26	44	12	0	2	2	8
HockeyAllsvenskan totals			152	31	57	88	135	—	—	—	—	—
