= Michael Vandas =

Slovak ice hockey player

- Born: 2 February 1991 (age 35) Poprad, Czechoslovakia
- Height: 189 cm (6 ft 2 in)
- Weight: 91 kg (201 lb; 14 st 5 lb)
- Position: Forward
- Shoots: Left
- Slovak team Former teams: HK Spišská Nová Ves; HK Poprad; HK Orange 20; HC Vítkovice Ridera; HC Litvínov; HKM Zvolen; HC Slovan Bratislava
- Playing career: 2008–present

Michael Vandas (born 2 February 1991) is a Slovak professional ice hockey player who currently playing for HK Spišská Nová Ves of the Slovak Extraliga.

== Career statistics ==
=== Regular season and playoffs ===
			Regular season					Playoffs
Season	Team	League	GP	G	A	Pts	PIM	GP	G	A	Pts	PIM
2005–06	HK Poprad	Slovak U18	6	1	1	2	0	—	—	—	—	—
2006–07	HK Poprad	Slovak U18	13	3	7	10	35	—	—	—	—	—
2006–07	HK Poprad	Slovak-Jr.	38	6	9	15	20	—	—	—	—	—
2007–08	HK Poprad	Slovak U18	5	3	1	4	14	—	—	—	—	—
2007–08	HK Poprad	Slovak-Jr.	40	8	18	26	34	—	—	—	—	—
2008–09	HK Poprad	Slovak-Jr.	16	9	13	22	22	—	—	—	—	—
2008–09	HK Poprad	Slovak	15	1	1	2	0	—	—	—	—	—
2009–10	Omaha Lancers	USHL	—	—	—	—	—	—	—	—	—	—
2009–10	Topeka RoadRunners	NAHL	4	1	0	1	4	—	—	—	—	—
2009–10	HK Poprad	Slovak-Jr.	0	0	0	0	0	3	3	4	7	0
2009–10	HK Orange 20	Slovak	29	4	7	11	24	—	—	—	—	—
2010–11	HK Poprad	Slovak-Jr.	4	6	8	14	4	—	—	—	—	—
2010–11	HK Poprad	Slovak	7	1	2	3	2	14	0	0	0	0
2010–11	HK Orange 20	Slovak	17	6	3	9	12	—	—	—	—	—
2011–12	HK Poprad	Slovak	36	10	23	33	24	6	0	2	2	4
2012–13	HK Poprad	Slovak	49	21	31	52	83	7	3	3	6	4
2013–14	HC Vítkovice Ridera	Czech	43	7	8	15	12	8	2	3	5	8
2014–15	HC Vítkovice Ridera	Czech	50	10	11	21	30	4	1	2	3	12
2015–16	HC Vítkovice Ridera	Czech	50	10	15	25	38	—	—	—	—	—
2016–17	HC Vítkovice Ridera	Czech	47	6	8	14	28	5	0	4	4	4
2017–18	HK Poprad	Slovak	10	6	1	7	2	—	—	—	—	—
2017–18	HC Litvínov	Czech	23	4	2	6	4	—	—	—	—	—
2018–19	HKM Zvolen	Slovak	46	13	24	37	32	11	1	3	4	2
2019–20	HC Slovan Bratislava	Slovak	10	4	5	9	8	—	—	—	—	—
2019–20	HK Poprad	Slovak	36	11	14	25	22	—	—	—	—	—
2020–21	HK Poprad	Slovak	41	13	16	29	24	15	2	5	7	8
2021–22	HK Poprad	Slovak	34	5	16	21	22	3	2	1	3	0
2022–23	HK Spišská Nová Ves	Slovak	47	8	13	21	30	13	2	2	4	8
Czech totals			213	37	44	81	112	17	3	9	12	24
Slovak totals			377	103	156	259	285	69	10	16	26	26

=== International ===
Year	Team	Event	Result	GP	G	A	Pts	PIM
2009	Slovakia	WJC18	7th	6	2	0	2	2
2010	Slovakia	WJC	8th	6	0	0	0	0
2011	Slovakia	WJC	8th	5	0	3	3	0
Junior totals				17	2	3	5	2
