= Kim Strömberg =

Finnish ice hockey player

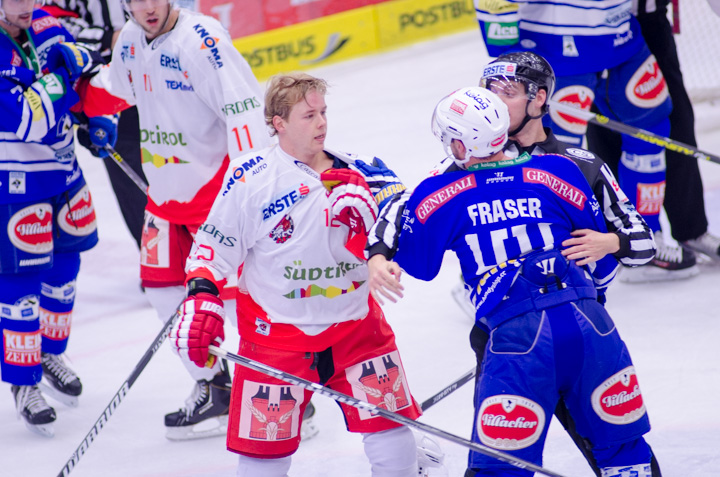
- Born: December 8, 1987 (age 38) Helsinki, Finland
- Height: 6 ft 2 in (188 cm)
- Weight: 203 lb (92 kg; 14 st 7 lb)
- Position: Wing
- Shoots: Left
- Liiga team Former teams: SaiPa; Jokerit; Tappara; HK Poprad; Orli Znojmo; HC Bolzano; EC KAC; Herning Blue Fox; KooKoo; IK Oskarshamn; HC Kometa Brno
- Playing career: 2006–present

Kim Strömberg (born December 8, 1987) is a Finnish professional ice hockey Winger who currently playing for SaiPa of the Liiga.

== Playing career ==
Strömberg started his professional career in his native Finland for Jokerit of the then SM-liiga, before moving to league rivals Tappara. In the 2013–14 season, Strömberg helped HC Bolzano in their inaugural season in the EBEL, to become the first non Austrian league champions by scoring 13 points in as many post season games.

On April 17, 2014, Strömberg opted to leave Bolzano and join his third EBEL club, EC KAC on an optional two-year contract. At the conclusion of the 2014–15 season with Klagenfurt, Strömberg opted not to fulfil his second contracted year in Austria and returned to Finland, signing with SaiPa of the Liiga on June 22, 2015.
