= Petr Kolouch =

Czech ice hockey player

- Born: 30 October 1991 (age 33); Ostrava, Czechoslovakia
- Height: 187 cm (6 ft 2 in)
- Weight: 86 kg (190 lb; 13 st 8 lb)
- Position: Forward
- Shoots: Left
- team Former teams: Free agent HC Olomouc; HC Frýdek-Místek; HC Vítkovice; Salith Šumperk; AZ Havířov; Graz99ers; HK Poprad
- Playing career: 2011–present

Petr Kolouch (born 30 October 1991) is a Czech ice hockey forward. He is currently a free agent.

He made his debut in Czech Extraliga during the 2011–12 season with HC Vítkovice, and has also played in the second and third-tier Czech leagues.

== Career statistics ==
=== Regular season and playoffs ===
			Regular season					Playoffs
Season	Team	League	GP	G	A	Pts	PIM	GP	G	A	Pts	PIM
2022–23	HK Poprad	Slovak	14	5	2	7	10	3	0	0	0	6
