= Pontus Netterberg =

Swedish ice hockey player

- Born: 9 February 1992 (age 33) Varberg, Sweden
- Height: 6 ft 2 in (188 cm)
- Weight: 205 lb (93 kg; 14 st 9 lb)
- Position: Winger
- Shoots: Right
- SHL team Former teams: Växjö Lakers; HV71
- Playing career: 2010–present

Pontus Netterberg (born 9 February 1992) is a Swedish professional ice hockey player currently under contract with the Växjö Lakers of the Swedish Hockey League (SHL).

He has formerly played with HV71 in the Elitserien during the 2010–11 Elitserien season. After four seasons in the lower tiers in Sweden, Netterberg secured his second SHL contract, agreeing to a two-year deal with the Växjö Lakers on 25 April 2016.

== Awards and honours ==
| Award | Year |
|---|---|
SHL
| Le Mat Trophy (Växjö Lakers) | 2018 |
