= Tomi Leivo =

Finnish ice hockey player

- Born: September 24, 1989 (age 35); Lappeenranta, Finland
- Height: 5 ft 10 in (178 cm)
- Weight: 182 lb (83 kg; 13 st 0 lb)
- Position: Forward
- Shoots: Left
- SM-liiga team: SaiPa
- NHL draft: Undrafted
- Playing career: 2009–present

Tomi Leivo (born September 24, 1989) is a Finnish ice hockey player who currently plays professionally in Finland for SaiPa of the SM-liiga.
