= Simon Krekula =

Swedish professional ice hockey player (born 1998)

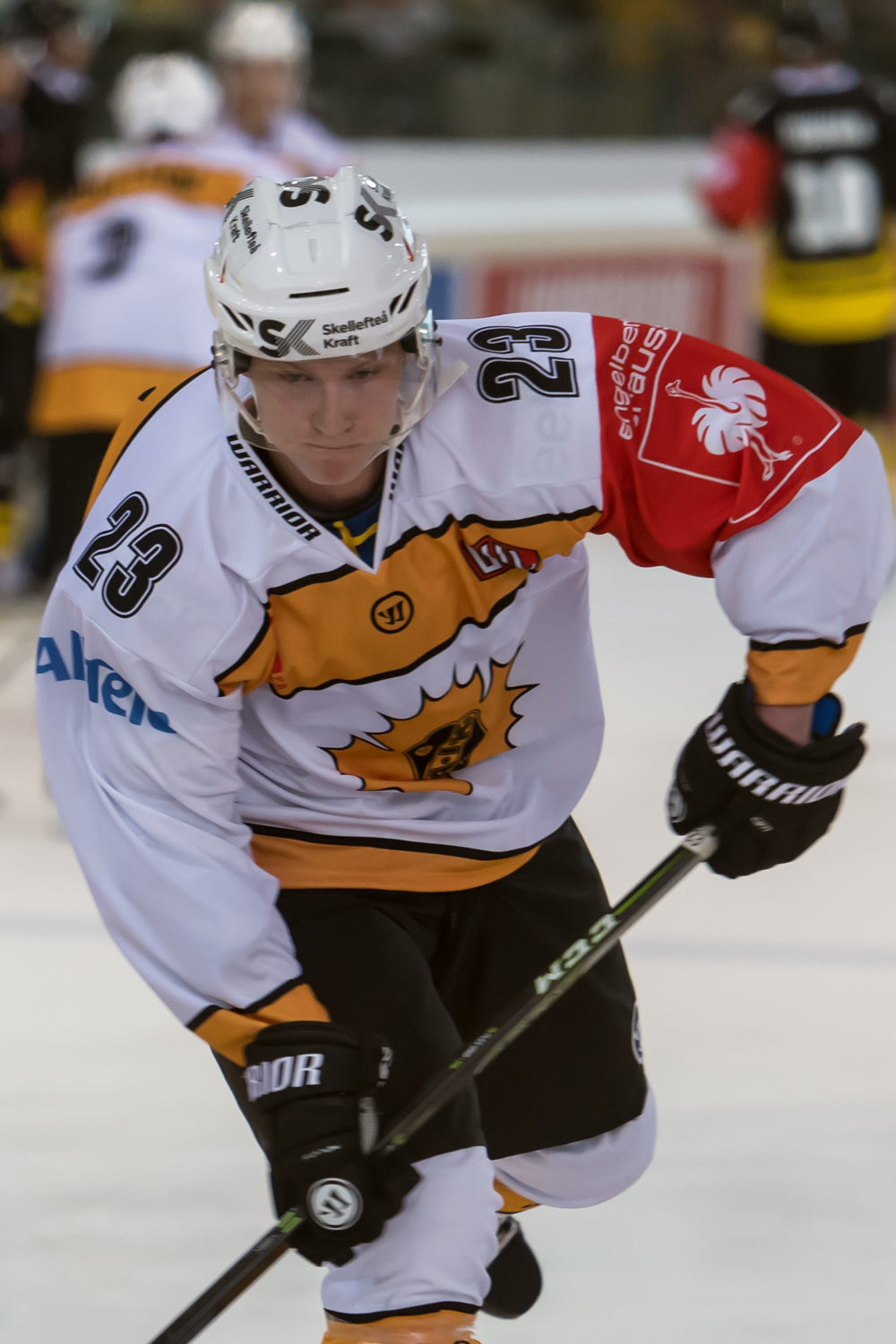
- Simon Krekula with Skellefteå AIK
- Born: February 5, 1998 (age 28) Stockholm, Sweden
- Height: 5 ft 11 in (180 cm)
- Weight: 179 lb (81 kg; 12 st 11 lb)
- Position: Forward
- Shoots: Right
- Allsv team Former teams: HC Vita Hästen; Skellefteå AIK
- Playing career: 2015–present

Simon Krekula (born February 5, 1998) is a Swedish professional ice hockey player. He is currently playing with HC Vita Hästen of the HockeyAllsvenskan (Allsv).

== Playing career ==
Krekula's career began with Skellefteå AIK where he played on the U16, U18 and U20 junior teams. In 2012–13, he debuted at the under-16 level, playing six games in the J16 SM. The following season he dressed for 19 U18 games, recording six goals and twelve assists. He also competed with a regional all-star team from Västerbotten in the annual TV-pucken, an under-15 national tournament, and notched two goals and five assists over eight games. In 2014–15, Krekula moved on to the J20 SuperElit scene.

After two impressive seasons in J20, appearing in 80 games, and recording 63 points, Krekula logged his first minutes in Sweden's top-flight SHL.

Having left Skellefteå AIK at the conclusion of his contract on 25 June 2018, Krekula agreed to an initial one-year contract with Allsvenskan club, HC Vita Hästen.

== Career statistics ==
=== Regular season and playoffs ===
			Regular season					Playoffs
Season	Team	League	GP	G	A	Pts	PIM	GP	G	A	Pts	PIM
2014–15	Skellefteå AIK	J20	27	6	6	12	12	5	1	1	2	6
2015–16	Skellefteå AIK	J20	38	10	18	28	40	6	1	2	3	2
2016–17	Skellefteå AIK	J20	25	10	13	23	16	2	0	0	0	0
2016–17	Skellefteå AIK	SHL	9	0	0	0	4	—	—	—	—	—
2017–18	Skellefteå AIK	J20	14	1	7	8	35	–	–	–	–	–
2017–18	Skellefteå AIK	SHL	35	1	1	2	14	4	0	1	1	0
2017–18	Piteå HC	Div.1	1	0	0	0	0	12	2	1	3	6
2018–19	HC Vita Hästen	Allsv	34	9	5	14	8	—	—	—	—	—
SHL totals			44	1	1	2	18	4	0	1	1	0

=== International ===
Year	Team	Event	Result	GP	G	A	Pts	PIM
2014	Sweden	U17	3rd place, bronze medalist(s)	6	0	1	1	0
Junior totals				6	0	1	1	0
