= Vojtěch Tomi =

Czech ice hockey player

- Born: 26 February 1994 (age 31) Ostrava, Czech Republic
- Height: 184 cm (6 ft 0 in)
- Weight: 88 kg (194 lb; 13 st 12 lb)
- Position: Forward
- Shoots: Left
- Italy2 team Former teams: Toblach-Dobbiaco; HC Vítkovice Ridera; HC Oceláři Třinec
- Playing career: 2013–present

Vojtěch Tomi (born 26 February 1994) is a Czech ice hockey forward currently playing for Hockey Club Toblach-Dobbiaco of the Italian Hockey League.
