= Lukáš Kovář =

Czech ice hockey player (born 1992)

- Born: 10 January 1992 (age 33) Ostrava, Czechoslovakia
- Height: 6 ft 6 in (198 cm)
- Weight: 231 lb (105 kg; 16 st 7 lb)
- Position: Defence
- Shoots: Left
- ELH team Former teams: HC Vítkovice; HC Oceláři Třinec; HK Dukla Trencin; Piráti Chomutov
- Playing career: 2011–present

Lukáš Kovář (born 10 January 1992) is a Czech professional ice hockey defenceman currently under contract with HC Vítkovice Ridera of the Czech Extraliga (ELH). He played with HC Vítkovice in the Czech Extraliga during the 2010–11 Czech Extraliga season.
