= Jan Piskáček =

Czech ice hockey player

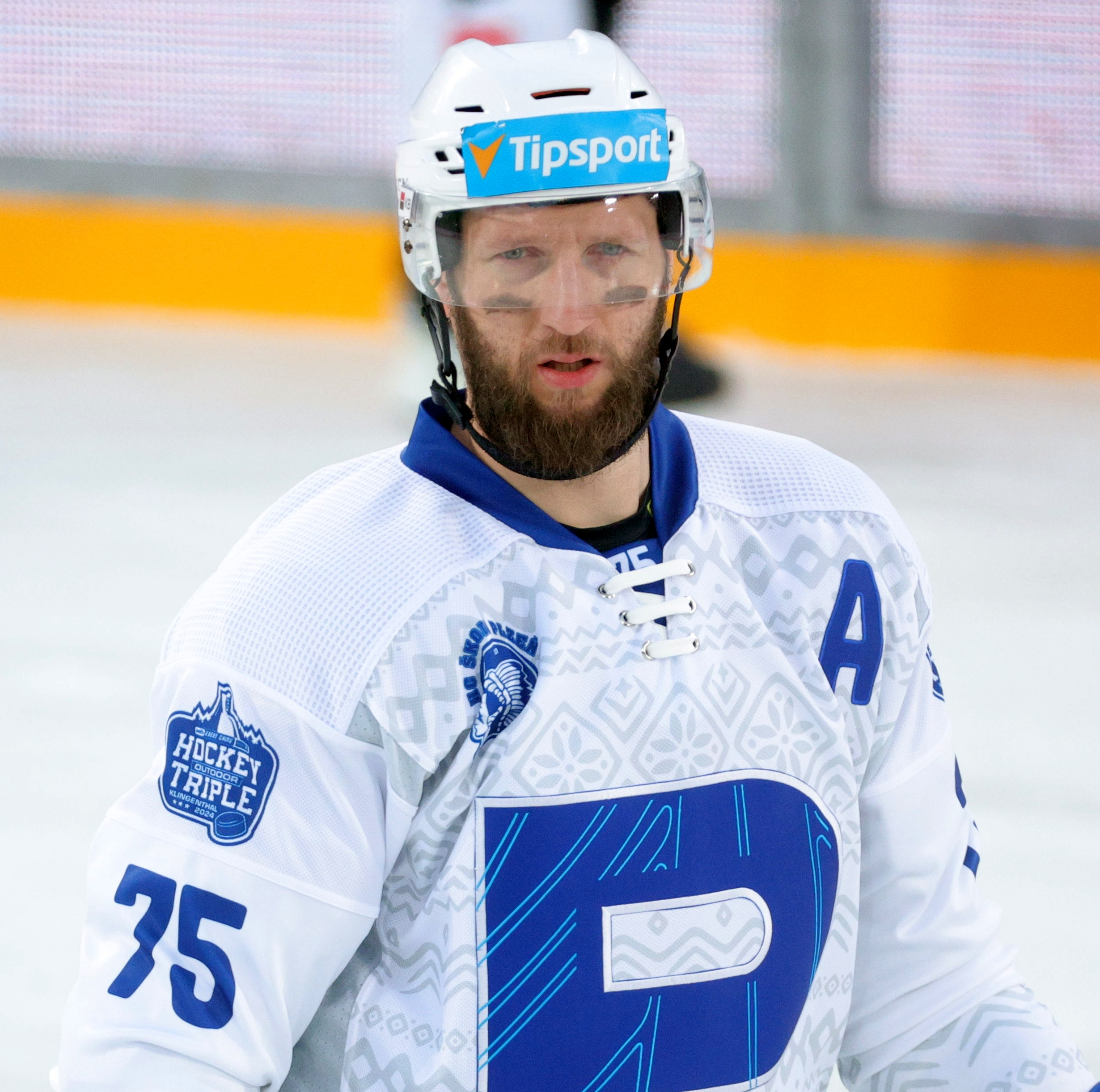
- Piskáček in 2024
- Born: September 11, 1989 (age 36) Kladno, Czechoslovakia
- Height: 5 ft 11 in (180 cm)
- Weight: 194 lb (88 kg; 13 st 12 lb)
- Position: Defence
- Shoots: Left
- ELH team Former teams: HC Plzeň; Rytíři Kladno; HC Sparta Praha; Motor České Budějovice
- NHL draft: Undrafted
- Playing career: 2010–present

Jan Piskáček (born September 11, 1989) is a Czech professional ice hockey defenceman currently playing under contract with HC Škoda Plzeň of the Czech Extraliga (ELH). He formerly played with HC Sparta Praha in the ELH during the 2010–11 Czech Extraliga season.
