= Daniel Dolejš =

Czech ice hockey player

- Born: 4 July 1994 (age 30); Humpolec, Czech Republic
- Height: 5 ft 10 in (178 cm)
- Weight: 181 lb (82 kg; 12 st 13 lb)
- Position: Goaltender
- Catches: Left
- Czech.1 team Former teams: HC Poruba 2011; HC Vítkovice
- Playing career: 2011–present

Daniel Dolejš (born 4 July 1994) is a Czech professional ice hockey goaltender. He currently plays with HC Poruba 2011 of the Czech.1 Liga (Czech.1).

Dolejš made his Czech Extraliga debut playing with HC Vítkovice Steel during the 2013–14 Czech Extraliga season.
