= Petr Kalina =

Czech ice hockey player

- Born: 9 July 1997 (age 28) Roudnice, Czech Republic
- Height: 5 ft 11 in (180 cm)
- Weight: 159 lb (72 kg; 11 st 5 lb)
- Position: Defense
- Shoots: Left
- Czech team: HC Sparta Praha
- Playing career: 2015–present

Petr Kalina (born 9 July 1997) is a Czech professional ice hockey player. He is currently playing for HC Sparta Praha of the Czech Extraliga.

Kalina made his Czech Extraliga debut playing with Mountfield HK during the 2015–16 Czech Extraliga season.
