= Yannick Rathgeb =

Swiss ice hockey player

- Born: October 24, 1995 (age 30) Langenthal, Switzerland
- Height: 6 ft 1 in (185 cm)
- Weight: 195 lb (88 kg; 13 st 13 lb)
- Position: Defence
- Shoots: Right
- NL team Former teams: HC Fribourg-Gottéron; Bridgeport Sound Tigers; EHC Biel
- Playing career: 2015–present

Yannick Rathgeb (born October 24, 1995) is a Swiss professional ice hockey defenceman who is currently playing with HC Fribourg-Gottéron of the National League (NL). He previously played with EHC Biel in the NL and with the Bridgeport Sound Tigers of the American Hockey League (AHL).

== Playing career ==
=== Junior ===
Rathgeb started playing hockey in his hometown of Langenthal, Switzerland before joining the SCL Tigers to play with their U20 team in the Elite Junior A league. He spent the majority of the 2011-12 season with the U17 team, playing only 8 games (3 points) with the U20. He became a regular with the U20 team the next year in 2012-13, appearing in 35 regular season games and putting up 31 points, including 15 goals. He added 3 assists in 4 post-season contests.

Rathgeb joined the Plymouth Whalers of the Ontario Hockey League (OHL) for the 2013-14 season as the #113 overall pick in the 2013 CHL Import Draft. He played a second season with the Whalers in 2014-15 and appeared in 91 regular season games (37 points) and 1 playoffs game over 2 seasons. During the 2014 OHL playoffs, Rathgeb was suspended 10 games for hitting Guelph Storm forward Robby Fabbri from behind.

=== Professional ===
==== HC Fribourg-Gottéron ====
On March 19, 2015, at the conclusion of his junior career, he returned to Switzerland and joined HC Fribourg-Gottéron of the National League (NL). He made his NL debut during the 2015-16 season, playing a full season of 50 games and racking up an impressive 27 points. At the conclusion of the season, Rathgeb received the NL best rookie award. In his second season with Fribourg, Rathgeb agreed to a two-year contract extension with an NHL-out clause on December 12, 2016.

He went on to play a total of 133 regular season games (89 points) with Fribourg over 3 seasons.

==== New York Islanders ====
On April 6, 2018, Rathgeb agreed to a two-year entry-level contract with the New York Islanders of the National Hockey League (NHL). Rathgeb was assigned to the Bridgeport Sound Tigers of the American Hockey League (AHL) to begin the 2018-19 season. He was limited to 32 regular season games in his first year with the Islanders organization and he was released at the end of the season.

==== EHC Biel ====
On May 20, 2019, Rathgeb joined EHC Biel of the NL on a three-year deal. He finished the 2019-20 season, his first in Biel, as the team's third point scorer and first among defensemen with 32 points (10 goals) in 49 regular season games.

== International play ==
Rathgeb served as captain of Switzerland's national junior team at the 2015 World Junior Championships.

Rathgeb made his debut with Switzerland men's national team in February 2016.

== Personal life ==
Rathgeb was born in Langenthal, Switzerland and played most of his junior hockey with SC Langenthal's various junior teams before moving to North America in 2013.
