= Julien Sprunger =

Swiss professional ice hockey player (born 1986)

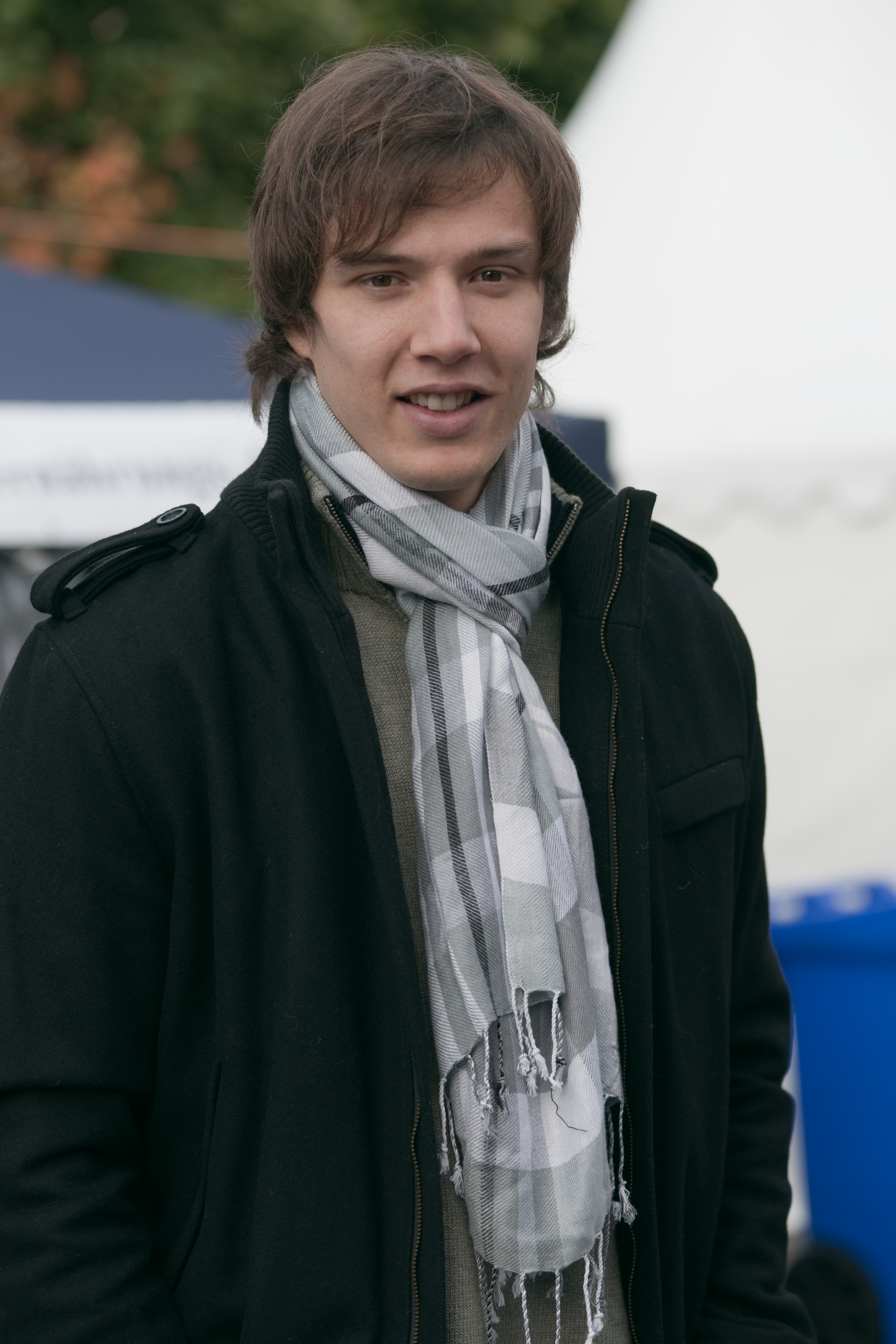
- Sprunger in 2009
- Born: January 4, 1986 (age 40) Fribourg, Switzerland
- Height: 6 ft 4 in (193 cm)
- Weight: 198 lb (90 kg; 14 st 2 lb)
- Position: Right wing
- Shot: Right
- Played for: HC Fribourg-Gottéron
- National team: Switzerland
- NHL draft: 117th overall, 2004; Minnesota Wild
- Playing career: 2002–2026

Julien Sprunger (born 4 January 1986) is a Swiss former professional ice hockey player. He is the longtime captain of HC Fribourg-Gottéron of the National League (NL), and was selected by the Minnesota Wild in the 4th round (117th overall) of the 2004 NHL entry draft.

== Career statistics ==
=== Regular season and playoffs ===
			Regular season					Playoffs
Season	Team	League	GP	G	A	Pts	PIM	GP	G	A	Pts	PIM
2002–03	HC Fribourg–Gottéron	SUI.2 U20	24	21	19	40	32	—	—	—	—	—
2002–03	HC Fribourg–Gottéron	NLA	2	0	0	0	0	—	—	—	—	—
2002–03	HC Düdingen Bulls	SUI.3	10	7	1	8	8	3	1	1	2	4
2003–04	HC Fribourg–Gottéron	SUI U20	13	7	8	15	24	—	—	—	—	—
2003–04	HC Fribourg–Gottéron	NLA	42	2	3	5	14	4	0	0	0	4
2004–05	HC Fribourg–Gottéron	SUI U20	4	3	4	7	4	—	—	—	—	—
2004–05	HC Fribourg–Gottéron	NLA	41	9	7	16	35	—	—	—	—	—
2004–05	HC La Chaux–de–Fonds	SUI.2	1	0	0	0	0	—	—	—	—	—
2005–06	HC Fribourg–Gottéron	SUI U20	2	2	1	3	6	—	—	—	—	—
2005–06	HC Fribourg–Gottéron	NLA	38	19	14	33	36	—	—	—	—	—
2006–07	HC Fribourg–Gottéron	NLA	34	10	10	20	46	—	—	—	—	—
2007–08	HC Fribourg–Gottéron	NLA	49	27	20	47	34	5	2	1	3	20
2008–09	HC Fribourg–Gottéron	NLA	47	25	21	46	56	10	6	4	10	6
2009–10	HC Fribourg–Gottéron	NLA	28	9	17	26	10	7	4	2	6	2
2010–11	HC Fribourg–Gottéron	NLA	50	16	26	42	42	4	0	2	2	4
2011–12	HC Fribourg–Gottéron	NLA	49	27	24	51	22	11	2	4	6	6
2012–13	HC Fribourg–Gottéron	NLA	32	19	14	33	18	16	5	8	13	10
2013–14	HC Fribourg–Gottéron	NLA	49	12	21	33	32	10	6	4	10	4
2014–15	HC Fribourg–Gottéron	NLA	50	14	26	40	18	—	—	—	—	—
2015–16	HC Fribourg–Gottéron	NLA	43	25	11	36	20	5	1	0	1	2
2016–17	HC Fribourg–Gottéron	NLA	50	26	25	51	16	—	—	—	—	—
2017–18	HC Fribourg–Gottéron	NL	20	7	6	13	4	5	1	3	4	4
2018–19	HC Fribourg–Gottéron	NL	50	20	18	38	33	—	—	—	—	—
2019–20	HC Fribourg–Gottéron	NL	34	7	18	25	8	—	—	—	—	—
2020–21	HC Fribourg–Gottéron	NL	51	15	11	26	16	5	0	0	0	0
2021–22	HC Fribourg–Gottéron	NL	41	18	19	37	10	8	3	1	4	6
2022–23	HC Fribourg–Gottéron	NL	49	15	18	33	10	2	0	0	0	0
NL totals			849	323	329	651	480	92	30	29	59	68

=== International ===
Year	Team	Event	GP	G	A	Pts	PIM
2004	Switzerland	WJC18 D1	5	7	2	9	0
2005	Switzerland	WJC	6	0	0	0	2
2006	Switzerland	WJC	6	2	3	5	12
2007	Switzerland	WC	7	2	0	2	4
2008	Switzerland	WC	7	3	2	5	6
2009	Switzerland	WC	5	0	0	0	0
2010	Switzerland	OG	5	2	0	2	2
2011	Switzerland	WC	6	0	1	1	2
Junior totals			17	9	5	14	14
Senior totals			30	7	3	10	14
