= Lukáš Klimek =

Czech ice hockey player

Lukas Klimek
- Born: November 14, 1986 (age 38); Ostrava, Czechoslovakia
- Height: 6 ft 2 in (188 cm)
- Weight: 190 lb (86 kg; 13 st 8 lb)
- Position: Forward
- Shoots: Left
- Czech Extraliga team: HC Sparta Praha
- Playing career: 2006–present

Lukáš Klimek (born November 14, 1986) is a Czech professional ice hockey player. He played with HC Vítkovice in the Czech Extraliga during the 2010–11 Czech Extraliga season.
