= Eetu Koski =

Finnish ice hockey player

- Born: 29 July 1992 (age 33) Uusikaupunki, Finland
- Height: 5 ft 11 in (180 cm)
- Weight: 187 lb (85 kg; 13 st 5 lb)
- Position: Centre
- Shot: Left
- Played for: Kiekko-Vantaa; Lukko; LeKi; TUTO Hockey; Mikkelin Jukurit; KeuPa HT; SaiPa; Podhale Nowy Targ; HK Budapest; Diables Noirs de Tours
- Playing career: 2011–2021

Eetu Koski (born 29 July 1992) is a Finnish professional ice hockey player currently playing for Lukko of the Finnish Liiga.
