= Beat Gerber =

Swiss ice hockey player

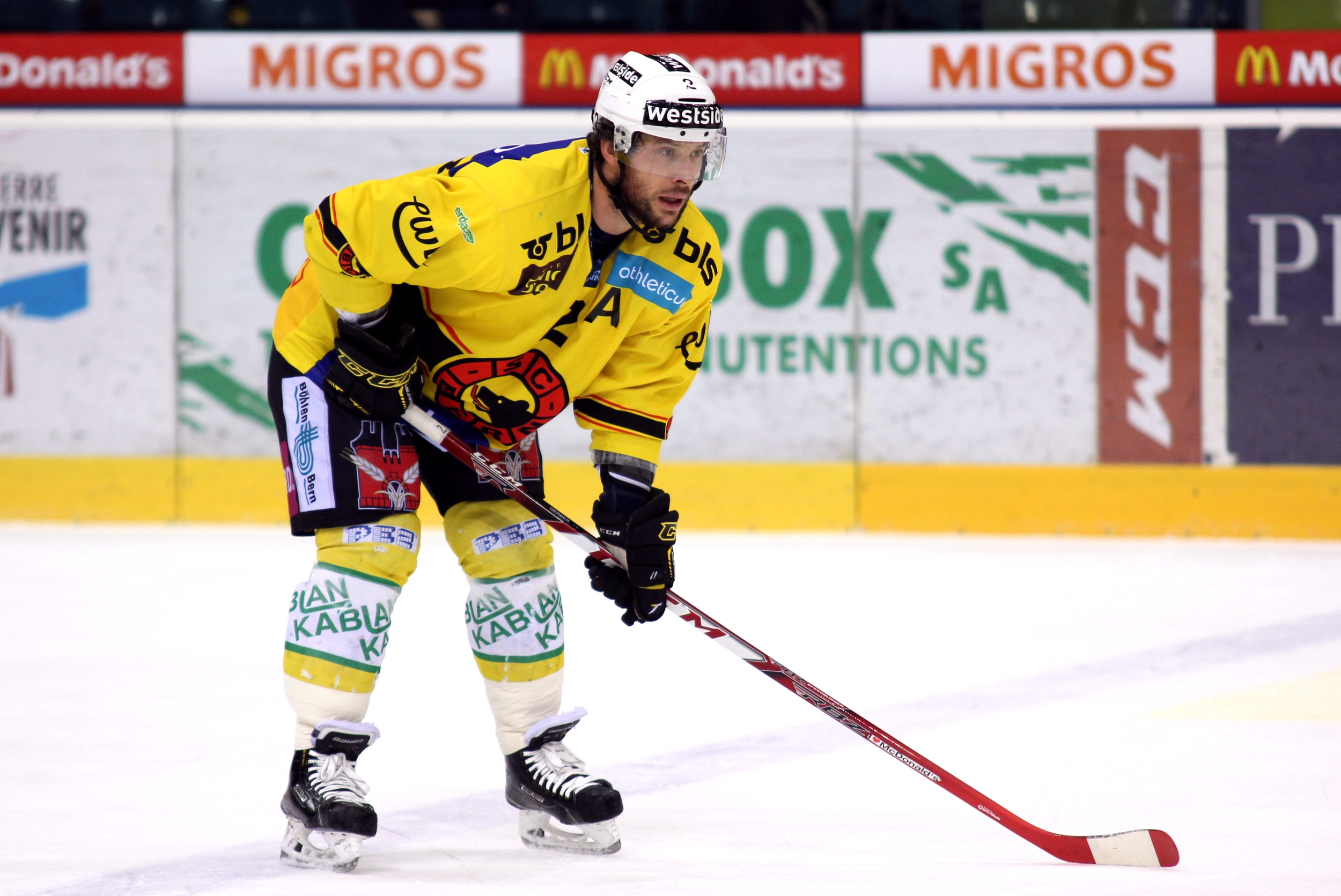
- Born: 16 May 1982 (age 44) Oberlangenegg, Switzerland
- Height: 5 ft 11 in (180 cm)
- Weight: 201 lb (91 kg; 14 st 5 lb)
- Position: Defence
- Shot: Left
- Played for: SCL Tigers; SC Bern
- National team: Switzerland
- Playing career: 2000–2026

Beat Gerber (born 16 May 1982) is a Swiss former professional ice hockey player who last played for SC Bern of Switzerland's National League (NL).

On 28 September 2017, Gerber signed a two-year contract extension with the SC Bern.

He participated at the 2011 IIHF World Championship as a member of the Switzerland men's national ice hockey team.

== Awards and honours ==
Award	Year
NL
Champion (SC Bern)	2004, 2010, 2013, 2016, 2017, 2019

== Career statistics ==
			Regular season					Playoffs
Season	Team	League	GP	G	A	Pts	PIM	GP	G	A	Pts	PIM
1998–99	SC Langnau U20	Elite Jr. A	33	0	2	2	24	8	0	0	0	0
1999–00	SC Langnau U20	Elite Jr. A	27	4	9	13	52	1	0	0	0	0
1999–00	SC Langnau	NLA	25	0	0	0	4	—	—	—	—	—
2000–01	SC Langnau U20	Elite Jr. A	5	1	1	2	6	4	0	1	1	6
2000–01	SC Langnau	NLA	39	0	0	0	10	—	—	—	—	—
2000–01	HC Ajoie	NLB	2	0	0	0	0	—	—	—	—	—
2000–01	EHC Visp	NLB	3	1	2	3	0	—	—	—	—	—
2001–02	SC Langnau U20	Elite Jr. A	10	2	4	6	4	—	—	—	—	—
2001–02	SC Langnau	NLA	38	3	1	4	10	—	—	—	—	—
2001–02	EHC Visp	NLB	3	0	0	0	0	—	—	—	—	—
2002–03	SC Langnau	NLA	43	3	3	6	20	—	—	—	—	—
2003–04	SC Bern	NLA	45	2	4	6	28	15	0	0	0	8
2004–05	SC Bern	NLA	43	2	5	7	47	8	0	0	0	0
2005–06	SC Bern	NLA	44	1	2	3	20	6	0	1	1	4
2006–07	SC Bern	NLA	42	0	3	3	26	17	0	2	2	22
2007–08	SC Bern	NLA	50	3	10	13	52	6	0	0	0	6
2008–09	SC Bern	NLA	36	1	5	6	16	6	0	0	0	4
2009–10	SC Bern	NLA	49	1	2	3	40	15	2	2	4	22
2010–11	SC Bern	NLA	50	3	2	5	18	11	0	0	0	4
2011–12	SC Bern	NLA	49	2	6	8	16	17	1	3	4	10
2012–13	SC Bern	NLA	49	0	6	6	30	20	0	2	2	12
2013–14	SC Bern	NLA	36	1	7	8	16	—	—	—	—	—
2014–15	SC Bern	NLA	39	1	5	6	37	11	0	1	1	4
2015–16	SC Bern	NLA	49	4	6	10	16	13	0	1	1	4
2016–17	SC Bern	NLA	48	2	6	8	28	16	2	1	3	10
2017–18	SC Bern	NL	39	0	1	1	8	8	0	1	1	4
2018–19	SC Bern	NL	50	2	5	7	4	18	0	1	1	6
2019–20	SC Bern	NL	35	0	6	6	26	—	—	—	—	—
2020–21	SC Bern	NL	46	2	5	7	26	9	0	1	1	0
2021–22	SC Bern	NL	48	1	6	7	47	—	—	—	—	—
2022–23	SC Bern	NL	49	0	3	3	16	7	0	0	0	0
2024–25	EHC Bumbach	SwissDiv3	10	3	2	5	4	—	—	—	—	—
2025–26	EHC Bumbach	SwissDiv3	17	2	9	11	6	—	—	—	—	—
NL/NLA totals			1,041	34	99	133	561	203	5	16	21	120
