= Juraj Mikuš (ice hockey, born 1988) =

Slovak ice hockey player

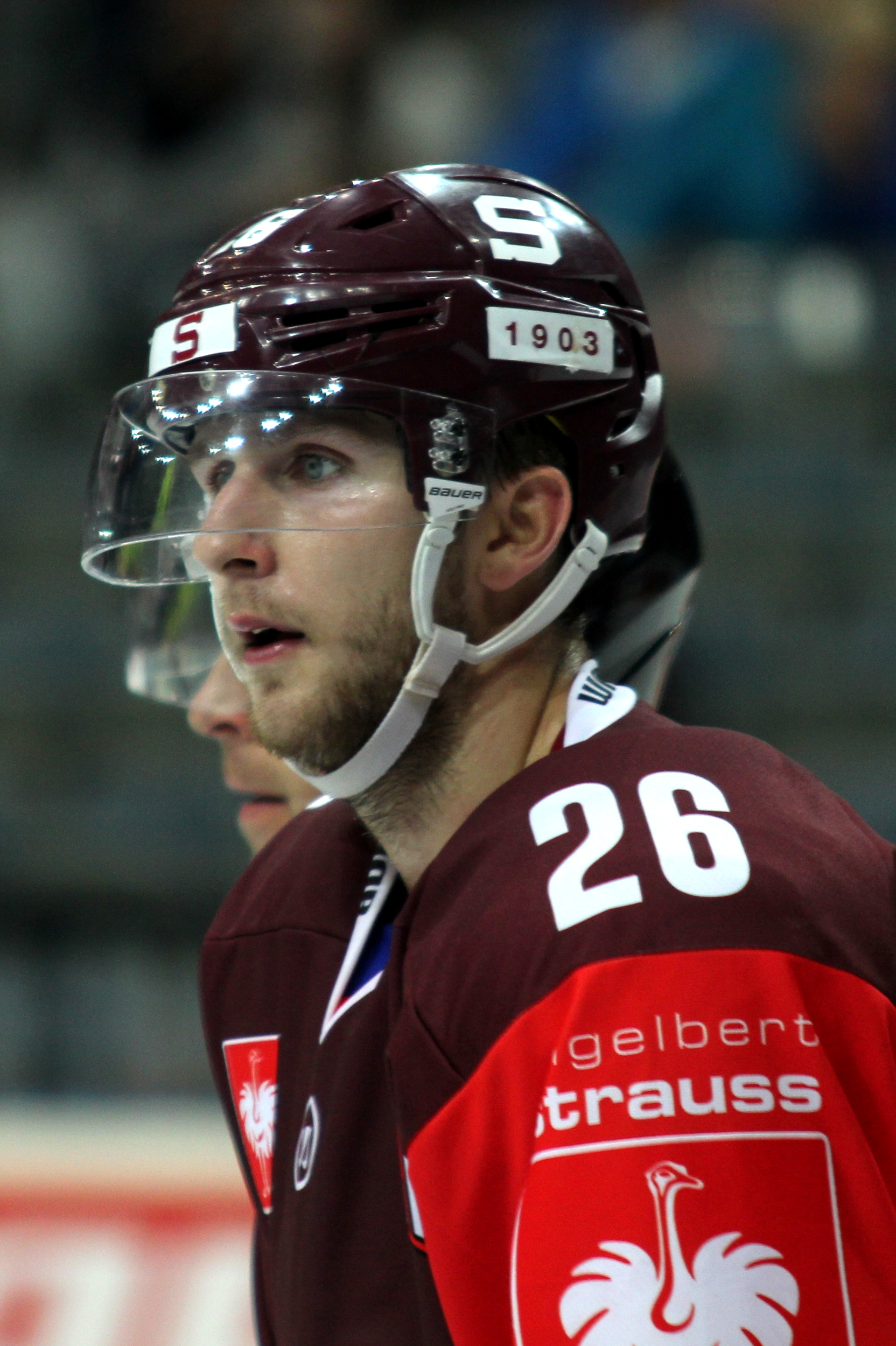
- Born: 30 November 1988 (age 37) Trenčín, Czechoslovakia
- Height: 6 ft 4 in (193 cm)
- Weight: 220 lb (100 kg; 15 st 10 lb)
- Position: Defence
- Shoots: Left
- ELH team Former teams: HC Vítkovice; HC Dukla Trenčín; Toronto Marlies; HC Lev Praha; HC Sparta Praha; HC Kometa Brno; HC Dynamo Pardubice
- National team: Slovakia
- NHL draft: 134th overall, 2007; Toronto Maple Leafs
- Playing career: 2006–present

Juraj Mikuš (born 30 November 1988) is a Slovak professional ice hockey defenceman currently playing for HC Vítkovice Ridera of the Czech Extraliga (ELH). Mikuš was drafted by the Toronto Maple Leafs in the fifth round of the 2007 NHL entry draft.

== Playing career ==
Mikuš was drafted by the Toronto Maple Leafs in the fifth round of the 2007 NHL entry draft. He continued to play in Slovakia until moving to Canada to play for the Toronto Marlies, ahead of the 2009–10 season. The Maple Leafs assigned Mikuš, as well as various other players, to their AHL affiliate Marlies, on 19 September 2009.

On 20 June 2012, Mikuš left the Maple Leafs organization and signed with HC Lev Praha of the Kontinental Hockey League. He was among a number of players to sign one-year contract extensions with Lev Praha in April 2013.

=== Czech Extraliga ===
On 10 July 2014, Mikus opted to remain in Prague, signing a one-year deal with HC Sparta Praha of the Czech Extraliga.

He played in four seasons with Sparta Praha, before leaving as a free agent and agreeing to a one-year contract with fellow Extraliga club, HC Kometa Brno, on 8 May 2018. He scored one goal and provided four assists in 17 games for Brno. In November 2018, he moved to Dynamo Pardubice, also playing in the Extraliga, on a loan deal lasting until the end of April 2020. In May 2020, Mikuš finished his loan from Kometa Brno and signed with Dynamo Pardubice directly. He played with Pardubice until the 2021–22 season, when he was one of 13 players to leave the club. He subsequently moved to HC Vítkovice. Having made 543 regular-season appearances in the Czech Extraliga, Mikuš ended his career in Vitkovice in April 2025.
