= Adam Brodecki (ice hockey) =

Swedish professional ice hockey player

- Born: February 22, 1995 (age 30) Stockholm, Sweden
- Height: 5 ft 11 in (180 cm)
- Weight: 168 lb (76 kg; 12 st 0 lb)
- Position: Right wing
- Shoots: Right
- Liiga team Former teams: JYP Jyväskylä; Brynäs IF; Växjö Lakers; Linköping HC; Malmö Redhawks
- Playing career: 2013–present

Adam Brodecki (born February 22, 1995) is a Swedish professional ice hockey player. He is currently playing for the JYP Jyväskylä of the Finnish Liiga.

== Playing career ==
Brodecki made his Swedish Hockey League debut playing with Brynäs IF during the 2013–14 SHL season.

He returned for a second stint with Brynäs IF after three seasons with Växjö Lakers and Linköping HC, signing a one-year deal for the 2019–20 season on 26 August 2019. In his return, Brodecki contributed with 6 goals and 14 points in 37 games before he left the club mid-season in a trade with the Malmö Redhawks while agreeing to a two-year contract extension on 10 February 2020.

On 3 September 2021, Brodecki left the SHL after eight seasons and signed a one-year deal with Finnish Liiga club, JYP Jyväskylä.
