= 2013–14 Liiga season =

2013–14 SM-liiga
- Liiga introduced a new logo for the season
- League: SM-liiga
- Sport: Ice hockey
- Defending champions: HC Ässät Pori (2012–13)
- Duration: September 2013 – April 2014
- Number of teams: 14
- TV partner(s): Nelonen

Regular season
- Best record: Kärpät
- Runners-up: Tappara
- Season MVP: Michael Keränen
- Top scorer: Ville Vahalahti

Playoffs
- Playoffs MVP: Juhamatti Aaltonen

Finals
- Champions: Kärpät
- Runners-up: Tappara

SM-liiga seasons
- ← 2012–13 2014–15 →

The 2013–14 SM-liiga season is the 39th season of the SM-liiga, the top level of ice hockey in Finland, since the league's formation in 1975. The title was won by Kärpät who defeated Tappara in the finals.

This was the first season in which the league was known as "Liiga" in marketing purposes, having dropped the "SM" prefix. It was also the last season in the SM-liiga for Jokerit, which joined the Russia-based Kontinental Hockey League after the season.

== Teams ==
Team	City	Head coach	Arena	Capacity	Captain
Ässät	Pori	Pekka Virta	Porin jäähalli	6,466	Ville Uusitalo
Blues	Espoo	Jyrki Aho	Barona Areena	7,017	Kim Hirschovits
HIFK	Helsinki	~~Raimo Summanen~~28.2.2014; Harri Rindell	Helsingin jäähalli	8,200	Ville Peltonen
HPK	Hämeenlinna	~~Kai Rautio~~ 14.10.2013; Pasi Arvonen	Patria-areena	5,360	Ville Viitaluoma
Ilves	Tampere	Tuomas Toukkola	Tampereen jäähalli	7,600	Masi Marjamäki
Jokerit	Helsinki	~~Tomi Lämsä~~ 1.3.2014; Tomek Valtonen	Hartwall Areena	13,506	Ossi Väänänen
JYP	Jyväskylä	Marko Virtanen	Jyväskylän jäähalli	4,500	Eric Perrin
KalPa	Kuopio	~~Jari Laukkanen~~ 27.2.2014; Anssi Laine	Kuopion jäähalli	5,064	Jussi Timonen
Kärpät	Oulu	Lauri Marjamäki	Oulun Energia Areena	6,614	Lasse Kukkonen
Lukko	Rauma	Risto Dufva	Äijänsuo Arena	5,400	Otto Honkaheimo
Pelicans	Lahti	Hannu Aravirta	Isku Areena	5,530	Tommi Paakkolanvaara
SaiPa	Lappeenranta	Pekka Tirkkonen	Kisapuisto	4,825	Ville Koho
Tappara	Tampere	Jukka Rautakorpi	Tampereen jäähalli	7,600	Ville Nieminen
TPS	Turku	Kai Suikkanen	Turkuhalli	11,820	Tapio Laakso

== Regular season ==
Top six advanced straight to quarter-finals, while teams between 7th and 10th positions played wild card round for the final two spots. The SM-liiga is a closed series and thus there is no relegation.

Team	GP	W	OTW	OTL	L	GF	GA	+/−	P
Kärpät	60	36	8	7	9	190	106	+84	131
Tappara	60	31	8	7	14	168	128	+40	116
Lukko	60	30	4	3	23	153	138	+15	101
SaiPa	60	26	9	4	21	160	134	+26	100
JYP	60	26	7	6	21	154	149	+5	98
Blues	60	28	3	3	26	137	146	-9	93
Jokerit	60	25	5	8	22	156	145	+11	93
Pelicans	60	25	6	5	24	156	156	0	92
HIFK	60	25	4	5	26	147	145	+2	88
HPK	60	22	9	3	26	140	136	+4	87
Ilves	60	24	3	6	27	143	146	-3	84
Ässät	60	16	7	5	32	134	177	-43	67
TPS	60	12	6	11	31	135	197	-62	59
KalPa	60	12	3	9	36	101	172	-71	51

== Playoffs ==
=== Bracket ===
Wild-card round (best-of-3)
7	Jokerit	0
10	HPK	2
8	Pelicans	2
9	HIFK	0

Quarter-finals (best-of-7)
1	Kärpät	4
10	HPK	0
2	Tappara	4
8	Pelicans	2
3	Lukko	4
6	Blues	3
4	SaiPa	4
5	JYP	3

Semi-finals (best-of-7)
1	Kärpät	4
4	SaiPa	1
(Pairings are re-seeded after the first and second round)
2	Tappara	4
3	Lukko	3

Finals (best-of-7)
1	Kärpät	4
2	Tappara	3
Bronze medal game
3	Lukko	1
4	SaiPa	0

=== Wild card round (best-of-three) ===
==== (7) Jokerit vs. (10) HPK ====
15 March 2014; 17:00	Jokerit	1–5 (0–1, 1–3, 0–1)	HPK	Hartwall Areena; Attendance: 5,641

Game reference

Leland Irving
Miika Wiikman
Goalies
Juuse Saros
Referees:
Jari Levonen
Petri Lindqvist
Linesmen:
Jani Pesonen
Teemu Riikonen

	0–1	07:40 – O-P Grönholm (O. Paajanen, J. Koivisto)
	0–2	24:55 – T. Rautiainen (J. Karjalainen, O-P Grönholm)
N. Hardt (PP) – 30:35	1–2
	1–3	37:25 – T. Rautiainen (T. Vänttinen, A. Laakso)
	1–4	39:59 – P. Nikkilä (T. Vänttinen, M. Tuulola) (PP)
	1–5	42:57 – A. Bruun (T. Vänttinen, T. Rautiainen) (PP)

68 min
Penalties
6 min
28
Shots
28

16 March 2014; 17:00	HPK	3–2 (1–1, 1–1, 1–0)	Jokerit	Patria-areena; Attendance: 5,236

Game reference

Juuse Saros
Goalies
Leland Irving
Referees:
Antti Hämäläinen
Teemu Salminen
Linesmen:
Hannu Sormunen
Henri Neva

B. Rendulić (J. Kiilholma) – 02:51	1–0
	1–1	08:37 – J. Rita (B. Walter, J. Ruutu)
T. Rautiainen – 20:58	2–1
	2–2	26:55 – M. Hännikäinen (T. Mäki, M. Kousa)
T. Rinkinen (V. Järveläinen, A. Laakso) – 53:50	3–2

16 min
Penalties
6 min
30
Shots
18

HPK wins the series 2-0.

==== (8) Pelicans vs. (9) HIFK ====
15 March 2014; 17:00	Pelicans	1–0 OT (0–0, 0–0, 0–0, 1–0)	HIFK	Isku Areena; Attendance: 4,172

Game reference
Jere Myllyniemi	Goalies	Ville Husso	Referees: Aleksi Rantala; Antti Boman; Linesmen: Juha Suoraniemi; Markus Hägerström
J. Ritamäki (I. Pikkarainen) – 79:02 / 1–0			Referees: Aleksi Rantala; Antti Boman; Linesmen: Juha Suoraniemi; Markus Hägerström
4 min	Penalties	6 min	Referees: Aleksi Rantala; Antti Boman; Linesmen: Juha Suoraniemi; Markus Hägerström
25	Shots	24	Referees: Aleksi Rantala; Antti Boman; Linesmen: Juha Suoraniemi; Markus Hägerström

16 March 2014; 17:00	HIFK	1–2 OT (0–0, 0–1, 1–0, 0–1)	Pelicans	Helsingin jäähalli Attendance: 5,621

Game reference

Ville Husso
Goalies
Jere Myllyniemi
Referees:
Anssi Salonen
Timo Favorin
Linesmen:
Joonas Saha
Pasi Nieminen

	0–1	23:19 – J-P Pietilä (O. Korpikari, P. Rosa
J. Puustinen (C. Elkins, V. Peltonen) – 52:29	1–1
	1–2	64:50 – J. Leimu (T. Redenbach)

8 min
Penalties
8 min
36
Shots
16

Pelicans wins the series 2-0

=== Quarterfinals (best-of-seven) ===
==== (1) Kärpät vs. (10) HPK ====
21 March 2014; 18:30	Kärpät	3–1 (0–0, 1–1, 2–0)	HPK	Oulun Energia Areena, Oulu; Attendance: 6,409

Game reference

Tomi Karhunen
Goalies
Juuse Saros
Referees:
Anssi Salonen
Timo Favorin
Linesmen:
Harri Perämäki
Samuli Orava

E. Pirnes (J. Aaltonen) – 20:31	1–0
	1–1	29:53 – J. Karjalainen (A. Laakso, P. Nikkilä)
J. Junttila (J. Kemppainen, J. Donskoi) – 49:17	2–1
T. Kähkönen (I. Huml, V. Pokka) – 57:01	3–1

6 min
Penalties
34 min
29
Shots
28

22 March 2014; 17:00	HPK	0–1 (0–0,0–1,0–0)	Kärpät	Patria-areena, Hämeenlinna; Attendance: 4,904

Game reference
Juuse Saros	Goalies	Tomi Karhunen	Referees: Stefan Fonselius; Jussi Leppänen; Linesmen: Timo Heinonen; Sakari Suominen
0–1 / 36:37 – I. Huml (M. Niemelä, A. Vallin)			Referees: Stefan Fonselius; Jussi Leppänen; Linesmen: Timo Heinonen; Sakari Suominen
4 min	Penalties	6 min	Referees: Stefan Fonselius; Jussi Leppänen; Linesmen: Timo Heinonen; Sakari Suominen
29	Shots	17	Referees: Stefan Fonselius; Jussi Leppänen; Linesmen: Timo Heinonen; Sakari Suominen

24 March 2014; 18:30	Kärpät	3–2 OT (0–1, 1–1, 1–0, 1–0)	HPK	Oulun Energia Areena, Oulu; Attendance: 6,028

Game reference

Tomi Karhunen
Goalies
Juuse Saros
Referees:
Mikko Kaukokari
Tom Laaksonen
Linesmen:
Henri Neva
Hannu Sormunen

	0–1	09:03 – B. Rendulić (J. Kiilholma, P. Nikkilä)
J. Komulainen (J. Keränen, S. Suoranta) – 31:01	1–1
	1–2	34:04 – B. Rendulic (J. Saarinen, J. Kiilholma)
J. Aaltonen (A. Masuhr, M. Pyörälä) (PP) – 45:56	2–2
J. Aaltonen (M. Pyörälä, L. Kukkonen) – 70:30	3–2

4 min
Penalties
4 min
30
Shots
29

26 March 2014; 18:30	HPK	0–4 (0–2,0–1,0–1)	Kärpät	Patria-areena, Hämeenlinna; Attendance: 3,959

Game reference

Juuse Saros
Goalies
Tomi Karhunen
Referees:
Stefan Fonselius
Jukka Hakkarainen
Linesmen:
Markus Hägerström
Juha Suoraniemi

0–1	03:25 – A. Masuhr (J. Aaltonen, M. Pyörälä)
0–2	12:14 – M. Pyörälä (L. Kukkonen, A. Masuhr) (PP)
0–3	20:17 – M. Pyörälä (J. Aaltonen, E. Pirnes)
0–4	54:41 – J. Donskoi (J. Junttila, V. Eminger)

4 min
Penalties
4 min
26
Shots
20

Kärpät wins the series 4-0

==== (2) Tappara vs. (8) Pelicans ====
21 March 2014; 18:30	Tappara	3–2 (0–0, 2–1, 1–1)	Pelicans	Tampereen jäähalli, Tampere; Attendance: 5,150

Game reference

Juha Metsola
Goalies
Jere Myllyniemi
Referees:
Aleksi Rantala
Antti Boman
Linesmen:
Erkki Mikkonen
Pasi Nieminen

J. Green (P. Saravo) – 27:10	1–0
E. Kaksonen – 33:20	2–0
	2–1	39:59 – V. Sopanen (T. Redenbach, P. Rosa) (PP)
	2–2	48:40 – I. Pikkarainen (T. Paakkolanvaara, J. Ritamäki)
J. Malinen (T. Plíhal, K. Kuusela) – 51:14	3–2

30 min
Penalties
8 min
37
Shots
33

22 March 2014; 17:00	Pelicans	2–1 OT (0–0, 0–0, 1–1, 1–0)	Tappara	Isku Areena, Lahti; Attendance: 4,602

Game reference

Jere Myllyniemi
Goalies
Juha Metsola
Referees:
Jari Levonen
Petri Lindqvist
Linesmen:
Samuli Niskanen
Jani Pesonen

T. Paakkolanvaara (I. Pikkarainen, O. Korpikari) – 53:21	1–0
	1–1	54:48 – O. Palola (J. Green) (PP)
J. Ritamäki (I. Pikkarainen) – 77:06	2–1

6 min
Penalties
22 min
39
Shots
17

24 March 2014; 18:30	Tappara	3–1 (1–0, 2–0, 0–1)	Pelicans	Tampereen jäähalli, Tampere; Attendance: 5,313

Game reference

Juha Metsola
Goalies
Jere Myllyniemi
Referees:
Jari Levonen
Petri Lindqvist
Linesmen:
Masi Puolakka
Joonas Saha

A. Erkinjuntti (K. Kuusela, M. Kauppinen) – 09:46	1–0
H. Haapala (T. Plíhal, M. Kankaanperä) – 28:37	2–0
J. Peltola – 37:41	3–0
	3–1	59:00 – T. Pärssinen (J. Niinimäki, J. Latvala) (PP)

12 min
Penalties
14 min
30
Shots
28

26 March 2014; 18:30	Pelicans	2–3 (1–0,0–2,1–1)	Tappara	Isku Areena, Lahti; Attendance: 4,304

Game reference

Jere Myllyniemi
Goalies
Juha Metsola
Referees:
Antti Boman
Aleksi Rantala
Linesmen:
Aleksi Koskinen
Henri Tukia

J. Leimu (J. Niinimäki, J. Alanne) – 13:16	1–0
	1–1	22:03 – P. Jormakka (O. Palola, J. Green) (PP)
	1–2	29:16 – J. Peltola (J. Malinen, N. Bailen)
	1–3	40:54 – P. Jormakka
P. Saarenheimo (J. Leimu, N. Tuhkanen) (SH) – 42:58	2–3

8 min
Penalties
4 min
20
Shots
20

28 March 2014; 18:30	Tappara	2–3 (0–1,1–1,1–1)	Pelicans	Tampereen jäähalli, Tampere; Attendance: 5,029

Game reference

Juha Metsola
Goalies
Jere Myllyniemi
Referees:
Jari Levonen
Petri Lindqvist
Linesmen:
Masi Puolakka
Joonas Saha

	0–1	03:48 – J. Mustonen (T. Redenbach, P. Rosa)
	0–2	32:15 – J. Latvala (T. Redenbach, A. Ylönen) (PP)
J. Voutilainen (K. Kuusela, N. Bailen) (PP) – 38:31	1–2
	1–3	57:42 – T. Redenbach (J. Mustonen)
K. Kuusela (N. Bailen, J. Green) – 59:52	2–3

12 min
Penalties
12 min
32
Shots
26

29 March 2014; 17:00	Pelicans	1–2 OT (0–1,0–0,1–0,0–1)	Tappara	Isku Areena, Lahti; Attendance: 4,078

Game reference

Jere Myllyniemi
Goalies
Juha Metsola
Referees:
Jukka Hakkarainen
Mikko Kaukokari
Linesmen:
Masi Puolakka
Jani Pesonen

	0–1	14:46 – J. Voutilainen (J. Green, K. Kuusela) (PP)
J. Alanne (V. Sopanen, J. Latvala) – 49:28	1–1
	1–2	60:46 – V. Nieminen (J. Voutilainen, T. Aalto)

8 min
Penalties
10 min
19
Shots
28

Tappara wins the series 4-2

==== (3) Lukko vs (6) Blues ====
21 March 2014; 18:30	Lukko	3–4 OT (2–1, 1–1, 0–1, 0–1)	Blues	Äijänsuo Arena, Rauma; Attendance: 4,023

Game reference

Ryan Zapolski
Goalies
Jani Nieminen
Referees:
Antti Hämäläinen
Jussi Leppänen
Linesmen:
Hannu Sormunen
Tommi Niittylä

T. Nurmi (M. Generous, P. Nummelin) – 01:56	1–0
J. Ahtola (V. Vahalahti, J. Keränen) – 03:35	2–0
	2–1	05:44 – T. Sallinen (M. Aaltonen, A. Laatikainen)
L. Tukonen (S. Zalewski, T. Koivisto) – 21:01	3–1
	3–2	26:37 – J. Makkonen (T. Sallinen) (PP)
	3–3	58:42 – M. Aaltonen (J. Makkonen) (EN)
	3–4	75:50 – M. Järvinen (A. Laatikainen)

10 min
Penalties
20 min
28
Shots
31

22 March 2014; 17:00	Blues	2–3 (2–1, 0–0, 0–2)	Lukko	Barona Areena, Espoo; Attendance: 5,835

Game reference

Jani Nieminen
Goalies
Ryan Zapolski
Referees:
Timo Metsälä
Teemu Salminen
Linesmen:
Iikka Kiilunen
Lauri Nikulainen

D. Widing (P. McRae, J. DiBenedetto) (PP) – 09:01	1–0
M. Aaltonen(T. Sallinen) – 14:32	2–0
	2–1	17:48 – J. Ahtola (A. Uusikartano)
	2–2	49:11 – P. Nummelin (V. Vahalahti, S. Zalewski) (PP)
	2–3	53:29 – S. Zalewski (T. Koivisto, L. Tukonen)

6 min
Penalties
8 min
29
Shots
24

24 March 2014; 18:30	Lukko	3–5 (1–2, 0–2, 2–1)	Blues	Äijänsuo Arena, Rauma; Attendance: 3,604

Game reference

Ryan Zapolski
Goalies
Jani Nieminen
Referees:
Timo Metsälä
Teemu Salminen
Linesmen:
Tommi Niittylä
Jani Pesonen

	0–1	09:59 – P. McRae (J. Makkonen, K. Kaijomaa)
	0–2	10:38 – K. Kaijomaa (M. Aaltonen, T. Sallinen) (PP)
J. Ahtola (A. Uusikartano) – 12:08	1–2
	1–3	25:17 – T. Sallinen (J. Makkonen, T. Huhtala) (PP)
	1–4	28:44 - P. McRae (T. Sallinen, K. Kaijomaa) (PP)
F. Riska (T. Nurmi) – 41:50	2–4
	2–5	52:35 – E. Pöysti (T. Sallinen, J. Jalvanti) (SH)
T. Nurmi (L. Tukonen, P. Nummelin) – 57:29	3–5

10 min
Penalties
12 min
39
Shots
29

26 March 2014; 18:30	Blues	4–5 OT (0–1,3–2,1–1,0–1)	Lukko	Barona Areena, Espoo; Attendance: 5,281

Game reference

Jani Nieminen
Goalies
Ryan Zapolski
Referees:
Antti Hämäläinen
Jussi Leppänen
Linesmen:
Pasi Nieminen
Lauri Nikulainen

	0–1	14:24 – P. Nummelin (T. Koivisto, A. Gagnon)
P. McRae (E. Pöysti, T. Sallinen) (PP) – 20:20	1–1
	1–2	26:23 – V. Vahalahti (A. Gagnon, L. Tukonen)
V. Virkkunen (J. Makkonen) – 28:58	2–2
M. Aaltonen (T. Huhtala, T. Sallinen) – 32:39	3–2
	3–3	36:35 – J. Tommila (J. Ahtola, A. Uusikartano)
T. Huhtala (M. Aaltonen, T. Sallinen) – 49:17	4–3
	4–4	57:44 – V. Vahalahti (P. Nummelin, A. Gagnon)
	4–5	61:47 – A. Uusikartano (J. Virtanen, R. Zapolski)

6 min
Penalties
8 min
29
Shots
22

28 March 2014; 18:30	Lukko	2–1 (0–0,2–0,0–1)	Blues	Äijänsuo Arena, Rauma; Attendance: 4,275

Game reference

Ryan Zapolski
Goalies
Jani Nieminen
Referees:
Timo Favorin
Anssi Salonen
Linesmen:
Henri Neva
Hannu Sormunen

O. Sipiläinen (F. Riska) – 27:46	1–0
T. Koivisto(J. Tommila, T. Nurmi) – 37:03	2–0
	2–1	47:46 – T. Huhtala (PP)

6 min
Penalties
8 min
28
Shots
30

29 March 2014; 17:00	Blues	2–1 OT (1–0,0–1,0–0,1–0)	Lukko	Barona Areena, Espoo; Attendance: 4,768

Game reference

Jani Nieminen
Goalies
Ryan Zapolski
Referees:
Antti Boman
Aleksi Rantala
Linesmen:
Markus Hägerström
Juha Suoraniemi

T. Sallinen (M. Aaltonen, J. Makkonen) – 19:58	1–0
	1–1	23:50 – A. Gognan (SH)
E. Pöysti (I. Pitkänen, A. Laatikainen) – 76:16	2–1

8 min
Penalties
31 min
35
Shots
41

31 March 2014; 18:30	Lukko	3–1 (1–1,1–0,1–0)	Blues	Äijänsuo Arena, Rauma; Attendance: 4,003

Game reference

Ryan Zapolski
Goalies
Jani Nieminen
Referees:
Timo Favorin
Jussi Leppänen
Linesmen:
Markus Hägerström
Juha Suoraniemi

E. Riska (F. Riska) – 11:37	1–0
	1–1	14:06 – E. Pöysti
M. Generous (L. Tukonen, J. Ahtola) – 32:07	2–1
V. Vahalahti (J. Keränen) – 47:57	3–1

6 min
Penalties
6 min
21
Shots
18

Lukko wins the series 4–3.

==== (4) SaiPa vs. (5) JYP ====
21 March 2014; 18:30	SaiPa	2–1 (1–1, 0–0, 1–0)	JYP	Kisapuisto, Lappeenranta; Attendance: 4,825

Game reference

Jussi Markkanen
Goalies
Tuomas Tarkki
Referees:
Mikko Kaukokari
Tom Laaksonen
Linesmen:
Aleksi Koskinen
Henri Tukia

	0–1	05:01 – T. Pihlman (J. Ikonen, B. Salcido)
S. Giliati (D. Spina, P. Davis) (PP) – 12:21	1–1
D. Spina (P. Savilahti, S. Giliati) (PP) – 57:48	2–1

6 min
Penalties
10 min
30
Shots
24

22 March 2014; 17:00	JYP	3–4 OT (1–2, 2–0, 0–1, 0–1)	SaiPa	Jyväskylän jäähalli, Jyväskylä; Attendance: 3,944

Game reference

Tuomas Tarkki
Goalies
Jussi Markkanen
Referees:
Antti Boman
Jukka Hakkarainen
Linesmen:
Masi Puolakka
Daniel Österholm

	0–1	P. Davis (S. Giliati, D. Spina) – 01:27
	0–2	J. Tavi (V. Koho) – 10:41
11:44 – M. Lahti (M. Wärn)	1–2
23:33 – A. Löfman (B. Salcido, E. Perrin)	2–2
26:50 – M. Salmio (M. Wärn, V. Hietanen)	3–2
	3–3	S. Backman (S. Giliati, P. Davis) – 47:25
	3–4	J. Mankinen (D. Spang, J. Tavi) – 71:16

2 min
Penalties
20 min
33
Shots
31

24 March 2014; 18:30	SaiPa	3–2 (2–0, 1–0, 0–2)	JYP	Kisapuisto, Lappeenranta; Attendance: 4,825

Game reference

Jussi Markkanen
Goalies
Tuomas Tarkki
Sami Rajaniemi
Referees:
Timo Favorin
Anssi Salonen
Linesmen:
Iikka Kiilunen
Daniel Österholm

T. Leivo – 13:15	1–0
D. Spina (P. Davis, D. Spang) (PP) – 19:26	2–0
P. Savilahti (D. Spang, P. Davis) – 34:36	3–0
	3–1	43:43 – J. Ikonen (V. Hietanen, T. Pihlman)
	3–2	48:52 – A. Löfman (J. Tuppurainen, J. Välivaara)

10 min
Penalties
12 min
27
Shots
31

26 March 2014; 18:30	JYP	2–1 (2–1,0–0,0–0)	SaiPa	Jyväskylän jäähalli, Jyväskylä; Attendance: 3,750

Game reference

Tuomas Tarkki
Goalies
Jussi Markkanen
Referees:
Jari Levonen
Petri Lindqvist
Linesmen:
Samuli Orava
Harri Perämäki

O. Louhivaara (J. Tuppurainen, A. Löfman) – 01:19	1–0
	1–1	03:01 – J. Mankinen (J. Tavi, S. Backman)
O. Louhivaara (J. Tuppurainen, A. Löfman) – 16:08	2–1

12 min
Penalties
31 min
25
Shots
23

28 March 2014; 18:30	SaiPa	1–2 (1–0,0–0,1–1)	JYP	Kisapuisto, Lappeenranta; Attendance: 4,825

Game reference

Jussi Markkanen
Goalies
Tuomas Tarkki
Referees:
Antti Boman
Aleksi Rantala
Linesmen:
Iikka Kiilunen
Daniel Österholm

J. Mankinen (V. Koho) – 07:32	1–0
	1–1	49:25 – M. Lahti (K. Näkyvä, M. Luoma)
	1–2	58:41 – K. Näkyvä (M. Lahti, O. Louhivaara) (PP)

6 min
Penalties
20 min
25
Shots
34

29 March 2014; 17:00	JYP	5–2 (3–1, 2–0, 0–1)	SaiPa	Jyväskylän jäähalli, Jyväskylä; Attendance: 3,918

Game reference

Sami Rajaniemi
Goalies
Andreas Bernard
Referees:
Jari Levonen
Petri Lindqvist
Linesmen:
Harri Perämäki
Samuli Orava

P. Hubacek (Y. Auvitu, T. Pihlman) – 02:48	1–0
P. Hubacek (M. Luoma, J. Halme) – 08:30	2–0
O. Louhivaara (J. Tuppurainen) – 11:22	3–0
	3–1	13:30 – D. Spang (J. Mankinen)
É. Perrin (J. Tuppurainen, B. Salcido) (PP) – 20:56	4–1
J. Tuppurainen (P. Hubacek, É. Perrin) (PP) – 23:28	5–1
	5–2	56:22 – O. Vauhkonen (D. Spang, S. Giliati)

12 min
Penalties
18 min
31
Shots
35

31 March 2014; 18:30	SaiPa	6–4 (1–1,3–2,2–1)	JYP	Kisapuisto, Lappeenranta; Attendance: 4,825

Game reference

Jussi Markkanen
Goalies
Sami Rajaniemi
Dennis Saikkonen
Referees:
Jari Levonen
Petri Lindqvist
Linesmen:
Iikka Kiilunen
Daniel Österholm

	0–1	07:37 – Y. Auvitu (M. Wärn)
D. Spina (P. Davis, S. Giliati) – 15:12	1–1
	1–2	25:58 – M. Wärn (K. Näkyvä, M. Lahti) (PP)
	1–3	27:57 – P. Hubacek (E. Perrin, M. Luoma)
J. Mankinen – 35:43	2–3
V. Hämäläinen (T. Jokinen) – 36:10	3–3
P. Savilahti (D. Spang, T. Leivo) – 38:10	4–3
	4–4	48:16 – Y. Auvitu (M. Poukkula)
P. Savilahti (D. Spang) – 58:05	5–4
V. Koho (EN) – 58:42	6–4

8 min
Penalties
8 min
35
Shots
25

SaiPa wins the series 4–3.

=== Semifinals (best-of-seven) ===
==== (1) Kärpät vs. (4) SaiPa ====
2 April 2014; 18:30	Kärpät	6–2 (3–2,1–0,2–0)	SaiPa	Oulun Energia Areena, Oulu; Attendance: 5,407

Game reference

Tomi Karhunen
Goalies
Jussi Markkanen
Andreas Bernard
Referees:
Timo Favorin
Jussi Leppänen
Linesmen:
Henri Neva
Hannu Sormunen

	0–1	00:49 – S. Venäläinen (V. Hämäläinen, D. Spang)
V. Pokka (J. Aaltonen, M. Pyörälä) – 08:01	1–1
	1–2	10:11 – P. Savilahti (V. Hämäläinen)
L. Kukkonen (M. Pyörälä, J. Aaltonen) (PP) – 15:38	2–2
J. Aaltonen(V. Pokka, M. Pyörälä) – 18:43	3–2
B. Maxwell (SH) – 33:29	4–2
V. Pokka (I. Huml, T. Kähkönen) (PP) – 49:42	5–2
J. Donskoi (V. Pokka, A. Vallin) (PP) – 59:30	6–2

8 min
Penalties
56 min
22
Shots
27

4 April 2014; 18:30	SaiPa	1–3 (0–2,0–1,1–0)	Kärpät	Kisapuisto, Lappeenranta; Attendance: 4,825

Game reference

Jussi Markkanen
Goalies
Tomi Karhunen
Referees:
Jari Levonen
Petri Lindqvist
Linesmen:
Iikka Kiilunen
Daniel Österholm

	0–1	03:42 – B. Maxwell (L. Kukkonen, A. Masuhr)
	0–2	05:31 – E. Pirnes (A. Ohtamaa, V. Pokka)
	0–3	30:54 – T. Kähkönen (V. Pokka, J. Donskoi) (PP)
P. Savilahti (D. Spang, D. Spina) (PP) – 52:13	1–3

6 min
Penalties
10 min
36
Shots
14

5 April 2014; 17:00	Kärpät	0–1 OT (0–0,0–0,0–0,0–1)	SaiPa	Oulun Energia Areena, Oulu; Attendance: 6,614

Game reference
Tomi Karhunen	Goalies	Jussi Markkanen	Referees: Timo Metsälä; Teemu Salminen; Linesmen: Henri Neva; Hannu Sormunen
0–1 / 60.51 – J. Tavi (D. Spang, J. Mankinen)			Referees: Timo Metsälä; Teemu Salminen; Linesmen: Henri Neva; Hannu Sormunen
2 min	Penalties	6 min	Referees: Timo Metsälä; Teemu Salminen; Linesmen: Henri Neva; Hannu Sormunen
32	Shots	22	Referees: Timo Metsälä; Teemu Salminen; Linesmen: Henri Neva; Hannu Sormunen

7 April 2014; 18:30	SaiPa	2–3 (1–0,1–1,0–2)	Kärpät	Kisapuisto, Lappeenranta; Attendance: 4,825

Game reference

Jussi Markkanen
Goalies
Tomi Karhunen
Referees:
Timo Metsälä
Teemu Salminen
Linesmen:
Iikka Kiilunen
Daniel Österholm

J. Mankinen – 18:46	1–0
J. Tavi (L. Taipalus, V. Koho) – 25:22	2–0
	2–1	26:50 – J. Aaltonen (E. Pirnes)
	2–2	55:46 – M. Pyörälä (J. Kemppainen, L. Kukkonen)
	2–3	56:45 – B. Maxwell (I. Huml)

12 min
Penalties
6 min
33
Shots
30

9 April 2014; 18:30	Kärpät	2–1 OT (1–1,0–0,0–0,1–0)	SaiPa	Oulun Energia Areena, Oulu; Attendance: 6,000

Game reference

Tomi Karhunen
Goalies
Jussi Markkanen
Referees:
Jukka Hakkarainen
Aleksi Rantala
Linesmen:
Henri Neva
Hannu Sormunen

L. Kukkonen (E. Pirnes, M. Pyörälä) (PP) – 04:55	1–0
	1–1	07:59 – V. Hämäläinen (S. Venäläinen, L. Taipalus)
M. Pyörälä (V. Pokka, J. Keränen) – 67:09	2–1

8 min
Penalties
6 min
27
Shots
30

Kärpät wins the series 4–1.

==== (2) Tappara vs. (3) Lukko ====
2 April 2014; 18:30	Tappara	5–2 (2–0 ,1–0 ,2–2)	Lukko	Tampereen jäähalli, Tampere; Attendance: 4,078

Game reference

Juha Metsola
Goalies
Ryan Zapolski
Referees:
Jukka Hakkarainen
Mikko Kaukokari
Linesmen:
Masi Puolakka
Joonas Saha

O. Palola (P. Jormakka, J-M Järvinen) (PP) – 07:23	1–0
N. Bailen (K. Kuusela, J. Voutilainen) (PP) – 14:45	2–0
K. Kuusela (J. Green, N. Bailen) (PP) – 21:11	3–0
	3–1	41:53 – A. Gagnon (V. Vahalahti, H. Tikkanen)
J-M Järvinen (P. Jormakka, O. Palola) – 42:38	4–1
	4–2	52:56 – T. Koivisto (A. Jaatinen, J. Virtanen)
J. Green(K. Kuusela, V. Nieminen) (EN) – 59:56	5–2

10 min
Penalties
26 min
27
Shots
37

4 April 2014; 18:30	Lukko	2–3 OT (0–1, 1–1, 1–0, 0–1)	Tappara	Äijänsuo Arena, Rauma; Attendance: 4,118

Game reference

Ryan Zapolski
Goalies
Juha Metsola
Referees:
Antti Boman
Aleksi Rantala
Linesmen:
Markus Hägerström
Juha Suoraniemi

	0–1	04:33 – P. Puistola (N. Bailen, A. Erkinjuntti)
T. Nurmi (I. Mikkola, S. Zalewski) – 25:37	1–1
	1–2	28:40 – K. Kuusela (J-M Järvinen, N. Bailen) (PP)
J. Virtanen (V. Vahalahti, S. Zalewski) – 59:24	2–2
	2–3	63:03 – V. Nieminen (J-M Järvinen, P. Jormakka) (PP)

8 min
Penalties
8 min
26
Shots
25

5 April 2014; 17:00	Tappara	0–1 OT (0–0, 0–0, 0–0 ,0–1)	Lukko	Tampereen jäähalli, Tampere; Attendance: 7,600

Game reference
Juha Metsola	Goalies	Ryan Zapolski	Referees: Jari Levonen; Petri Lindqvist; Linesmen: Pasi Nieminen; Jani Pesonen
0–1 / 60.15 – A. Gagnon (V. Vahalahti, T. Nurmi) (PP)			Referees: Jari Levonen; Petri Lindqvist; Linesmen: Pasi Nieminen; Jani Pesonen
33 min	Penalties	8 min	Referees: Jari Levonen; Petri Lindqvist; Linesmen: Pasi Nieminen; Jani Pesonen
22	Shots	27	Referees: Jari Levonen; Petri Lindqvist; Linesmen: Pasi Nieminen; Jani Pesonen

7 April 2014; 18:30	Lukko	2–3 OT (1–0, 1–2, 0–0, 0–1)	Tappara	Äijänsuo Arena, Rauma; Attendance: 4,003

Game reference

Ryan Zapolski
Goalies
Juha Metsola
Referees:
Jari Levonen
Petri Lindqvist
Linesmen:
Jani Pesonen
Sakari Suominen

I. Mikkola (J. Keränen, P. Nummelin) (PP) – 03:55	1–0
P. Nummelin (I. Mikkola, V. Vahalahti) (PP) – 20:50	2–0
	2–1	21:29 – M. Kankaanperä (J. Voutilainen, K. Kuusela)
	2–2	26:15 – J. Voutilainen (J. Green, K. Kuusela) (PP)
	2–3	65:15 – J. Green (V. Nieminen, J. Peltola)

12 min
Penalties
8 min
28
Shots
31

9 April 2014; 18:30	Tappara	1–2 OT (0–0, 0–1, 1–0, 0–1)	Lukko	Tampereen jäähalli, Tampere; Attendance: 5,642

Game reference

Juha Metsola
Goalies
Ryan Zapolski
Referees:
Jari Levonen
Petri Lindqvist
Linesmen:
Jani Pesonen
Masi Puolakka

	0–1	38:24 – J. Keränen (A. Gagnon)
P. Jormakka (J-M Järvinen, O. Palola) (PP) – 56:11	1–1
	1–2	64:29 – V. Vahalahti (A. Gagnon, J. Keränen)

6 min
Penalties
4 min
34
Shots
30

11 April 2014; 18:30	Lukko	4–2 (2–1, 1–1, 1–0)	Tappara	Äijänsuo Arena, Rauma; Attendance: 4,066

Game reference

Ryan Zapolski
Goalies
Juha Metsola
Referees:
Aleksi Rantala
Antti Boman
Linesmen:
Iikka Kiilunen
Joonas Saha

F. Riska (P. Nummelin, R. Zapolski) – 04:27	1–0
A. Gagnon (I. Mikkola, P. Nummelin) (PP) – 09:52	2–0
	2–1	13:33 – M. Kankaanperä (E. Kaksonen)
	2–2	21:22 – J. Voutilainen (M. Kauppinen, T. Plíhal) (PP)
H. Tikkanen (A. Jaatinen, S. Zalewski) – 26:03	3–2
V. Vahalahti (P. Nummelin, A. Gagnon) – 55:10	4–2

12 min
Penalties
12 min
20
Shots
21

12 April 2014; 17:00	Tappara	2–1 (1–1,0–0,1–0)	Lukko	Tampereen jäähalli, Tampere; Attendance: 6,013

Game reference

Juha Metsola
Goalies
Ryan Zapolski
Referees:
Jari Levonen
Petri Lindqvist
Linesmen:
Masi Puolakka
Sakari Suominen

N. Bailen (J-M Järvinen, O. Palola) (PP) – 04:30	1–0
	1–1	08:37 – T. Nurmi (SH)
H. Haapala (E. Kaksonen, J. Malinen) – 48:40	2–1

6 min
Penalties
33 min
26
Shots
19

Tappara wins the series 4–3.

=== Bronze medal game ===
14 April 2014; 18:30	Lukko	3–2 (0–1, 2–1, 1–0)	SaiPa	Äijänsuo Arena, Rauma; Attendance: 4,019

Game reference

Ryan Zapolski
Goalies
Jussi Markkanen
Referees:
Jari Levonen
Jukka Hakkarainen
Linesmen:
Hannu Sormunen
Henri Neva

	0–1	01:05 – V. Koho (D. Spang, Savilahti)
J. Ahtola (I. Mikkola, A. Gagnon) – 20:36	1–1
A. Gagnon (T. Nurmi, V. Vahalahti) – 27:15	2–1
	2–2	35:33 – S. Giliati (S-P Riikola, J. Rissanen)
V. Vahalahti (O. Honkaheimo, A. Gagnon) – 55:35	3–2

8 min
Penalties
6 min
19
Shots
20

=== Finals (best-of-seven) ===
15 April 2014; 18:30	Kärpät	2–1 (0–1, 1–0, 1–0)	Tappara	Oulun Energia Areena, Oulu; Attendance: 6,209

Game reference

Tomi Karhunen
Goalies
Juha Metsola
Referees:
Aleksi Rantala
Antti Boman
Linesmen:
Iikka Kiilunen
Joonas Saha

	0–1	04:18 – J. Green (N. Bailen, A. Erkinjuntti) (PP)
I. Huml (T. Kähkönen) – 33:08	1–1
J. Donskoi (J. Kemppainen, J. Junttila) – 57:46	2–1

6 min
Penalties
6 min
21
Shots
18

17 April 2014; 18:30	Tappara	4–3 (2–0, 1–0, 1–3)	Kärpät	Tampereen jäähalli, Tampere; Attendance: 7,600

Game reference

Juha Metsola
Goalies
Tomi Karhunen
Jussi Rynnäs
Referees:
Jukka Hakkarainen
Jari Levonen
Linesmen:
Masi Puolakka
Sakari Suominen

O. Palola (J-M Järvinen, P. Jormakka – 13:34	1–0
P. Jormakka (J-M Järvinen, O. Palola) (PP) – 15:39	2–0
M. Kauppinen (V. Nieminen, J-M Järvinen) (PP) – 29:42	3–0
	3–1	44:39 – M. Pyörälä (V. Pokka, J. Aaltonen) (PP)
	3–2	44:52 – M. Pyörälä (L. Kukkonen, V. Pokka) (PP)
	3–3	53:05 – A. Ohtamaa (A. Masuhr, B. Maxwell)
O. Palola (J-M Järvinen, M. Kauppinen) – 59:47	4–3

8 min
Penalties
6 min
19
Shots
39

19 April 2014; 17:00	Kärpät	2–3 (1–1,0–1,1–1)	Tappara	Oulun Energia Areena, Oulu; Attendance: 6,614

Game reference

Jussi Rynnäs
Goalies
Juha Metsola
Referees:
Aleksi Rantala
Antti Boman
Linesmen:
Hannu Sormunen
Henri Neva

J. Aaltonen (E. Pirnes, M. Pyörälä) (PP) – 14:52	1–0
	1–1	16:25 – J. Malinen (H. Haapala)
	1–2	23:39 – N. Bailen (J. Voutilainen)
I. Huml (B. Maxwell) – 44:33	2–2
	2–3	45:18 – A. Erkinjuntti (J. Larsson, P. Saravo)

6 min
Penalties
10 min
31
Shots
16

21 April 2014; 18:30	Tappara	3–2 OT (0–1,2–0,0–1,1–0)	Kärpät	Tampereen jäähalli, Tampere; Attendance: 7,600

Game reference

Juha Metsola
Goalies
Jussi Rynnäs
Referees:
Aleksi Rantala
Antti Boman
Linesmen:
Iikka Kiilunen
Joonas Saha

	0–1	15:08 – E. Pirnes (J. Komulainen, V. Pokka)
N. Bailen (J. Metsola) (PP) – 21:27	1–1
J. Green (J. Peltola, N. Bailen) – 34:44	2–1
	2–2	59:11 – J. Donskoi (J. Kemppainen, L. Kukkonen)
T. Plíhal (J. Peltola) – 75:23	3–2

14 min
Penalties
16 min
36
Shots
29

23 April 2014; 18:30	Kärpät	2–1 (0–0,1–1,1–0)	Tappara	Oulun Energia Areena, Oulu; Attendance: 6,614

Game reference

Tomi Karhunen
Goalies
Juha Metsola
Referees:
Jukka Hakkarainen
Jari Levonen
Linesmen:
Masi Puolakka
Sakari Suominen

E. Pirnes (I. Huml, J. Aaltonen) (PP) – 26:33	1–0
	1–1	34:42 – J. Voutilainen (A. Erkinjuntti, N. Bailen) (PP)
J. Aaltonen (I. Huml) – 46:13	2–1

8 min
Penalties
12 min
30
Shots
17

25 April 2014; 18:30	Tappara	2–3 (0–2,0–0,2–1)	Kärpät	Tampereen jäähalli, Tampere; Attendance: 7,600

Game reference

Juha Metsola
Goalies
Tomi Karhunen
Referees:
Jukka Hakkarainen
Jari Levonen
Linesmen:
Masi Puolakka
Sakari Suominen

	0–1	04:37 – J. Aaltonen (V. Pokka, L. Kukkonen) (PP)
	0–2	18:30 – A. Ohtamaa (A. Vallin, J. Junttila)
K. Kuusela (J. Voutilainen) – 46:07	1–2
J. Voutilainen (K. Kuusela, A. Erkinjuntti) (PP) – 50:01	2–2
	2–3	52:00 – I. Huml (B. Maxwell, T. Kähkönen) (PP)

10 min
Penalties
14 min
25
Shots
29

26 April 2014; 17:00	Kärpät	1–0 OT (0–0, 0–0, 0–0) (OT: 1–0)	Tappara	Oulun Energia Areena, Oulu; Attendance: 6,614

Game reference
Tomi Karhunen	Goalies	Juha Metsola	Referees: Jari Levonen; Jukka Hakkarainen; Linesman: Sakari Suominen
J. Aaltonen (B. Maxwell) – 67:24 / 1–0			Referees: Jari Levonen; Jukka Hakkarainen; Linesman: Sakari Suominen
8 min	Penalties	22 min	Referees: Jari Levonen; Jukka Hakkarainen; Linesman: Sakari Suominen
28	Shots	12	Referees: Jari Levonen; Jukka Hakkarainen; Linesman: Sakari Suominen

Kärpät wins the finals 4–3.

== Final rankings ==
Gold medal	Kärpät
Silver medal	Tappara
Bronze medal	Lukko
4	SaiPa
5	JYP
6	Blues
7	Pelicans
8	HPK
9	Jokerit
10	HIFK
11	Ilves
12	Ässät
13	TPS
14	KalPa
