= Juha-Pekka =

Juha-Pekka is a Finnish given name. Notable people with the given name include:

- Juha Pekka Alanen, Finnish guitarist of Altaria
- Juha-Pekka Haataja (born 1982), Finnish ice hockey player
- Juha-Pekka Hytönen (born 1981), Finnish ice hockey player
- Juha-Pekka Inkeröinen (born 1988), Finnish footballer
- Juha-Pekka Ketola (born 1983), Finnish ice hockey player
- Juha-Pekka "JP" Leppäluoto (born 1974), Finnish musician
- Juha-Pekka Pietilä (born 1991), Finnish ice hockey player
