= Alanne =

Alanne is a Finnish surname. Notable people with the surname include:

- Joonas Alanne (born 1990), Finnish hockey player
- Mikko Alanne (born 1972), Finnish screenwriter of The 33 (film) and other films
- Outi Alanne (born 1967), Finnish poet
- Severi Alanne (1879–1960), Finnish-American political activist and journalist
