= Oskari Korpikari =

Finnish ice hockey player

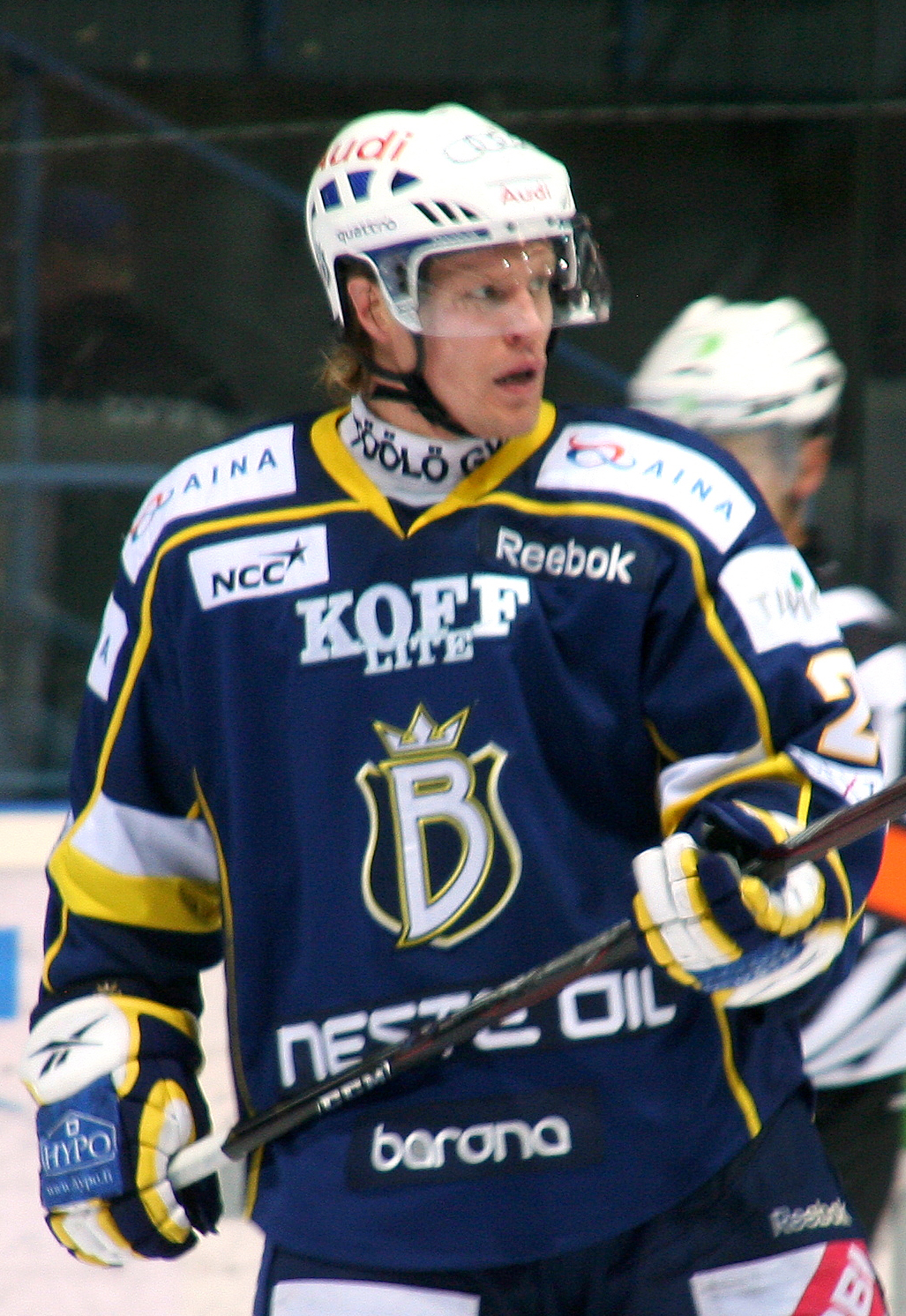
- Oskari Korpikari
- Born: 5 April 1984 (age 42) Kempele, Finland
- Height: 6 ft 2 in (188 cm)
- Weight: 209 lb (95 kg; 14 st 13 lb)
- Position: Defence
- Shot: Left
- Played for: Oulun Kärpät; Espoo Blues; Lahti Pelicans; Jokerit
- NHL draft: 217th overall, 2003; Montreal Canadiens
- Playing career: 2002–2016

Oskari Jussi Parvi Korpikari (born 5 April 1984) is a Finnish former professional ice hockey defenceman. He was selected in the seventh round, 217th overall, by the Montreal Canadiens in the 2003 NHL entry draft.

== Career statistics ==
=== Regular season and playoffs ===
			Regular season					Playoffs
Season	Team	League	GP	G	A	Pts	PIM	GP	G	A	Pts	PIM
2000–01	Laser HT	FIN.2 U18	14	2	2	4	2	—	—	—	—	—
2001–02	Kärpät	FIN U18	22	7	3	10	16	2	0	0	0	0
2001–02	Kärpät	FIN U20	5	0	0	0	0	—	—	—	—	—
2002–03	Kärpät	FIN U20	23	3	7	10	8	2	0	0	0	0
2002–03	Kärpät	SM-l	23	0	1	1	4	15	0	0	0	6
2003–04	Kärpät	FIN U20	7	3	1	4	8	—	—	—	—	—
2003–04	Kärpät	SM-l	35	0	1	1	14	7	0	0	0	2
2003–04	Suomi U20	Mestis	1	0	0	0	0	—	—	—	—	—
2004–05	Kärpät	FIN U20	13	6	6	12	10	5	1	4	5	4
2004–05	Kärpät	SM-l	21	0	0	0	10	—	—	—	—	—
2005–06	Kärpät	SM-l	56	1	1	2	60	11	0	1	1	2
2006–07	Kärpät	SM-l	49	3	3	6	56	10	1	0	1	0
2007–08	Kärpät	SM-l	39	2	6	8	26	—	—	—	—	—
2008–09	Kärpät	SM-l	41	5	4	9	32	1	0	1	1	10
2009–10	Kärpät	SM-l	48	3	8	11	67	10	0	1	1	6
2009–10	Hokki	Mestis	1	0	0	0	0	—	—	—	—	—
2010–11	Blues	SM-l	41	3	10	13	61	—	—	—	—	—
2011–12	Blues	SM-l	59	1	12	13	44	—	—	—	—	—
2012–13	Pelicans	SM-l	40	4	6	9	36	—	—	—	—	—
2013–14	Pelicans	Liiga	54	3	5	8	36	8	0	2	2	6
2014–15	Jokerit	KHL	28	4	3	7	16	9	1	1	2	8
2015–16	Jokerit	KHL	11	0	2	2	10	—	—	—	—	—
SM-l/Liiga totals			506	24	57	81	446	104	4	14	18	64

Medal record

Representing Finland

Ice hockey

World Junior Championships
Bronze medal – third place	2004 Helsinki	

=== International ===
Year	Team	Event	GP	G	A	Pts	PIM
2004	Finland	WJC	3	0	0	0	2
Junior totals			3	0	0	0	2
