= Janne Ritamäki =

Finnish ice hockey player (born 1986)

- Born: August 13, 1986 (age 39) Heinola, Finland
- Height: 6 ft 1 in (185 cm)
- Weight: 190 lb (86 kg; 13 st 8 lb)
- Position: Left wing
- Shoots: Left
- SM-liiga team: Lahti Pelicans
- NHL draft: Undrafted
- Playing career: 2007–present

Janne Ritamäki (born August 13, 1986) is a Finnish ice hockey player. His is currently playing with Lahti Pelicans in the Finnish SM-liiga.

Ritamäki made his SM-liiga debut playing with Lahti Pelicans during the 2012–13 SM-liiga season.

== Career statistics ==
			Regular season					Playoffs
Season	Team	League	GP	G	A	Pts	PIM	GP	G	A	Pts	PIM
2004–05	Peliitat Heinola	Suomi-sarja	12	0	1	1	0	—	—	—	—	—
2005–06	Lahti Pelicans U20	U20 SM-liiga	18	1	0	1	0	—	—	—	—	—
2006–07	Lahti Pelicans U20	U20 SM-liiga	36	4	7	11	14	2	0	0	0	4
2007–08	Peliitat Heinola	Mestis	40	1	6	7	12	—	—	—	—	—
2008–09	Peliitat Heinola	Mestis	43	6	7	13	18	—	—	—	—	—
2009–10	Peliitat Heinola	Mestis	43	10	12	22	44	—	—	—	—	—
2010–11	Peliitat Heinola	Mestis	47	5	15	20	56	—	—	—	—	—
2011–12	Peliitat Heinola	Mestis	43	9	7	16	14	—	—	—	—	—
2012–13	Peliitat Heinola	Mestis	3	0	0	0	6	—	—	—	—	—
2012–13	Lahti Pelicans	SM-liiga	45	4	3	7	26	—	—	—	—	—
2013–14	Lahti Pelicans	Liiga	45	7	3	10	8	8	2	1	3	6
2013–14	Peliitat Heinola	Mestis	3	0	0	0	0	—	—	—	—	—
2014–15	Lahti Pelicans	Liiga	57	7	4	11	30	—	—	—	—	—
2015–16	Lahti Pelicans	Liiga	55	7	6	13	61	7	1	0	1	8
2015–16	Peliitat Heinola	Mestis	2	0	0	0	0	—	—	—	—	—
2016–17	Mikkelin Jukurit	Liiga	60	8	12	20	36	—	—	—	—	—
2017–18	Mikkelin Jukurit	Liiga	49	7	7	14	36	—	—	—	—	—
2018–19	Mikkelin Jukurit	Liiga	11	1	1	2	8	—	—	—	—	—
2019–20	Mikkelin Jukurit	Liiga	55	3	5	8	22	—	—	—	—	—
Liiga totals			377	44	41	85	227	15	3	1	4	14
Mestis totals			224	31	47	78	150	—	—	—	—	—
