= Petteri Nikkilä =

Finnish ice hockey player

- Born: 27 July 1994 (age 30); Hämeenlinna, Finland
- Height: 5 ft 11 in (180 cm)
- Weight: 192 lb (87 kg; 13 st 10 lb)
- Position: Defense
- Shoots: Left
- Liiga team Former teams: HPK; SaPKo; Peliitat Heinola
- NHL draft: Undrafted
- Playing career: 2012–present

Petteri Nikkilä (born 27 July 1994) is a Finnish professional ice hockey player. He is currently playing for Linköpings hockey club

Nikkilä made his Liiga debut playing with HPK during the 2013–14 Liiga season.
