= Jussi Halme =

Finnish ice hockey player

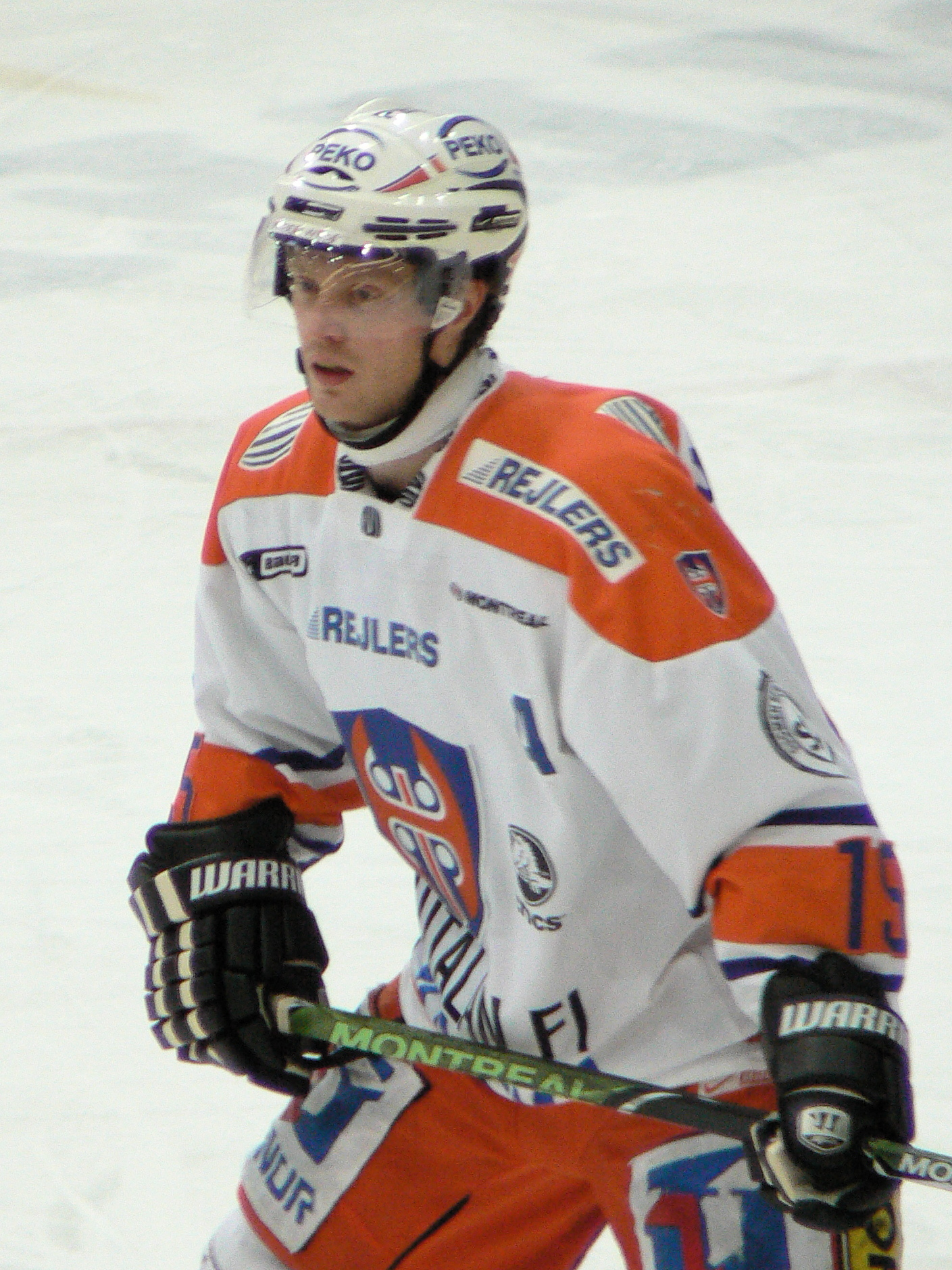
- Halme in 2009
- Born: August 24, 1980 (age 44); Nokia, Finland
- Height: 6 ft 0 in (183 cm)
- Weight: 181 lb (82 kg; 12 st 13 lb)
- Position: Defence
- Shot: Left
- Played for: Tappara; Blues; SaiPa; JYP
- Playing career: 2005–2014

Jussi Halme (born August 24, 1980) is a Finnish former professional ice hockey defenceman.

Halme played in the Liiga for Tappara, Blues, SaiPa and JYP.

== Career statistics ==
			Regular season					Playoffs
Season	Team	League	GP	G	A	Pts	PIM	GP	G	A	Pts	PIM
1995–96	Tappara U16	U16 SM-sarja	32	2	4	6	4	—	—	—	—	—
1996–97	Tappara U18	U18 SM-sarja	34	1	1	2	10	—	—	—	—	—
1997–98	Tappara U18	U18 SM-sarja	33	3	8	11	12	—	—	—	—	—
1998–99	Tappara U20	U20 SM-liiga	36	2	7	9	14	—	—	—	—	—
1999–00	Tappara U20	U20 SM-liiga	2	0	0	0	0	—	—	—	—	—
2000–01	Tappara U20	U20 SM-liiga	43	3	11	14	22	9	0	3	3	8
2001–02	University of Denver	NCAA	12	1	1	2	6	—	—	—	—	—
2002–03	University of Denver	NCAA	39	1	9	10	22	—	—	—	—	—
2003–04	University of Denver	NCAA	38	2	11	13	16	—	—	—	—	—
2004–05	University of Denver	NCAA	42	3	11	14	32	—	—	—	—	—
2005–06	Tappara	SM-liiga	15	0	0	0	4	—	—	—	—	—
2005–06	KooKoo	Mestis	10	2	9	11	12	—	—	—	—	—
2005–06	Espoo Blues	SM-liiga	27	0	1	1	10	9	0	2	2	10
2006–07	Södertälje SK	HockeyAllsvenskan	21	0	0	0	10	—	—	—	—	—
2006–07	Vaasan Sport	Mestis	8	1	2	3	6	8	2	2	4	10
2007–08	Tappara	SM-liiga	56	1	12	13	36	11	0	2	2	4
2008–09	Tappara	SM-liiga	58	5	14	19	26	—	—	—	—	—
2009–10	Tappara	SM-liiga	56	7	12	19	30	6	1	0	1	20
2010–11	Tappara	SM-liiga	30	1	8	9	20	—	—	—	—	—
2011–12	Tappara	SM-liiga	44	4	3	7	16	—	—	—	—	—
2011–12	LeKi	Mestis	1	0	0	0	0	—	—	—	—	—
2012–13	Tappara	SM-liiga	9	1	1	2	0	2	0	0	0	0
2012–13	LeKi	Mestis	25	0	9	9	10	—	—	—	—	—
2013–14	LeKi	Mestis	17	2	2	4	10	—	—	—	—	—
2013–14	SaiPa	Liiga	8	0	0	0	0	—	—	—	—	—
2013–14	JYP Jyväskylä	Liiga	23	3	2	5	20	3	0	1	1	0
SM-liiga totals			326	22	53	75	162	34	2	10	12	38
