= Marko Virtanen =

Finnish ice hockey player and coach

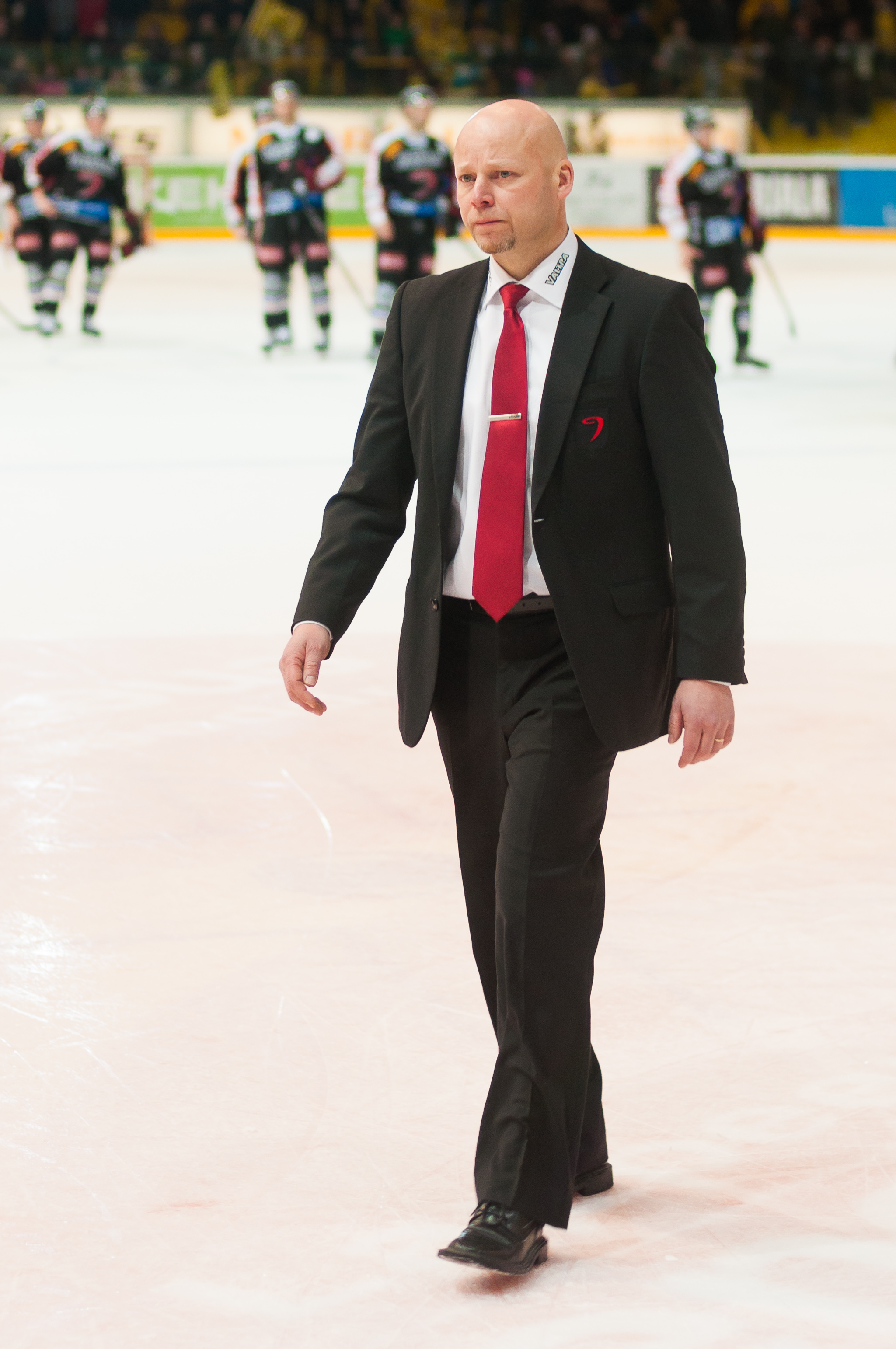
- Born: December 10, 1968 (age 57) Jyväskylä, Finland
- Height: 5 ft 10 in (178 cm)
- Weight: 181 lb (82 kg; 12 st 13 lb)
- Position: Right wing
- Shot: Left
- Played for: SM-liiga; JYP Jyväskylä; Elitserien; Färjestad BK; Södertälje SK
- Playing career: 1988–2000

Marko Virtanen (born December 10, 1968) is a Finnish former professional ice hockey player. He is currently the head coach of Lukko in the Finnish Liiga.

Virtanen assumed the position of head coach for JYP Jyväskylä with the 2013–14 Liiga season. He has also previously coached TPS Turku.
