= Jussi Rynnäs =

Finnish ice hockey player

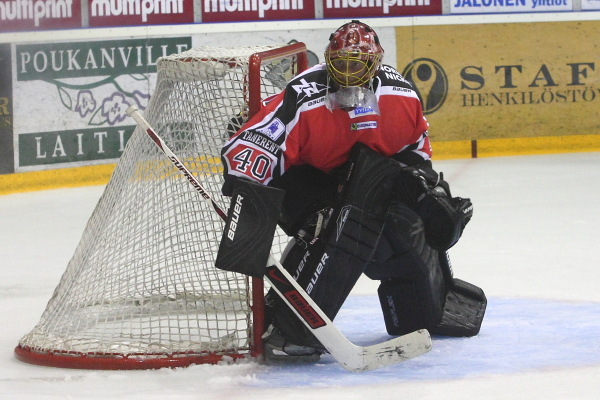
- Born: 22 May 1987 (age 39) Pori, Finland
- Height: 6 ft 5 in (196 cm)
- Weight: 205 lb (93 kg; 14 st 9 lb)
- Position: Goaltender
- Catches: Left
- SHL team Former teams: Linköping HC; Ässät; Toronto Maple Leafs; Oulun Kärpät; Dallas Stars; Ak Bars Kazan; Krefeld Pinguine
- NHL draft: Undrafted
- Playing career: 2005–present

Jussi Rynnäs (born 22 May 1987) is a Finnish professional ice hockey goaltender. He is currently playing for Linköping HC in the Swedish Hockey League (SHL).

== Playing career ==
As a younger player, Rynnäs was never considered a prime talent and was, for example, never drafted in the NHL. After becoming over-aged to play in the Ässät Junior team, Rynnäs had serious trouble in finding himself a team, ending up in the Finnish 3rd division. However, Ässät signed him for the 2009–2010 season and, after impressive performances in the pre-season games, Rynnäs got more and more responsibility and ended up becoming Ässät's number one Liiga goaltender and a fan favourite. He had the top save percentage (.927) during the 2009–10 season, and posted a 2.47 goals against average.

At the end of the season, several NHL teams showed interest, and Rynnäs chose Toronto. He and Brian Burke, president and general manager of the Toronto Maple Leafs, agreed to terms on a two-year entry-level contract.

He was recalled to the Toronto Maple Leafs on 27 March 2012 on an emergency basis due to the health of James Reimer. He made his first National Hockey League appearance in relief of Jonas Gustavsson that same night, against the Carolina Hurricanes. On 29 March 2012 a game against the Philadelphia Flyers, Leafs starting goaltender Jonas Gustavsson was injured during a pre-game warmup in the knee. Rynnas was informed by the coach Randy Carlyle that he was going to start the game. Rynnas allowed 7 goals on 30 shots in his first NHL start, as the Flyers won 7–1.

On 10 July 2013, Rynnas left the Maple Leafs organization as a free agent and returned to Finland signing a two-year contract with Oulun Kärpät. In the 2013–14 campaign, he produced a banner season to again lead the league with a 1.51 goals against average and a .939 save percentage.

On 7 July 2014, Rynnäs was released from the second year of his contract with Kärpät and returned to the NHL in signing a two-year contract with the Dallas Stars. In the 2014–15 season with the Stars, Rynnäs lost out on the backup position to start the year and was assigned to AHL affiliate, the Texas Stars. He later appeared in 2 games with Dallas, before returning to Texas for the duration of the season.

On 15 June 2015, it was announced that Rynnas had signed with Ak Bars Kazan of the KHL, after being placed on unconditional waivers by the Dallas Stars to forgo his final year of contract in North America.

Rynnäs later returned to his native Finland and played three more seasons with Oulun Kärpät in the Liiga, before leaving as a free agent following a finals defeat to HPK in the 2018–19 season.

On 10 May 2019 Rynnäs opted to continue his European by signing a one-year contract with German outfit, Krefeld Pinguine of the DEL.

== Career statistics ==
| | | | Regular season | | | | | | | | | Playoffs |
| Season | Team | League | GP | W | L | T/OT | MIN | GA | SO | GAA | SV% | GP | W | L | MIN | GA | SO | GAA | SV% |
|---|---|---|---|---|---|---|---|---|---|---|---|---|---|---|---|---|---|---|---|
| 2009–10 | Ässät | SM-l | 31 | 14 | 13 | 1 | 1717 | 71 | 3 | 2.48 | .927 | — | — | — | — | — | — | — | — |
| 2010–11 | Toronto Marlies | AHL | 30 | 9 | 15 | 3 | 1660 | 75 | 1 | 2.71 | .911 | — | — | — | — | — | — | — | — |
| 2011–12 | Toronto Marlies | AHL | 22 | 11 | 9 | 1 | 1272 | 54 | 3 | 2.55 | .910 | — | — | — | — | — | — | — | — |
| 2011–12 | Reading Royals | ECHL | 14 | 8 | 5 | 1 | 767 | 41 | 1 | 3.21 | .914 | — | — | — | — | — | — | — | — |
| 2011–12 | Toronto Maple Leafs | NHL | 2 | 0 | 1 | 0 | 99 | 7 | 0 | 4.25 | .825 | — | — | — | — | — | — | — | — |
| 2012–13 | Toronto Marlies | AHL | 21 | 10 | 9 | 1 | 1231 | 54 | 3 | 2.63 | .908 | — | — | — | — | — | — | — | — |
| 2012–13 | Toronto Maple Leafs | NHL | 1 | 0 | 0 | 0 | 10 | 0 | 0 | 0.00 | 1.000 | — | — | — | — | — | — | — | — |
| 2013–14 | Oulun Kärpät | Liiga | 40 | 28 | 5 | 7 | 2382 | 60 | 9 | 1.51 | .939 | 3 | 0 | 3 | 163 | 7 | 0 | 2.57 | .881 |
| 2014–15 | Texas Stars | AHL | 39 | 22 | 6 | 8 | 2202 | 93 | 4 | 2.53 | .920 | 2 | 0 | 2 | 119 | 6 | 0 | 3.02 | .922 |
| 2014–15 | Dallas Stars | NHL | 2 | 0 | 1 | 0 | 92 | 7 | 0 | 4.57 | .841 | — | — | — | — | — | — | — | — |
| 2015–16 | Ak Bars Kazan | KHL | 19 | 7 | 6 | 5 | 1041 | 38 | 3 | 2.19 | .921 | — | — | — | — | — | — | — | — |
| 2016–17 | Oulun Kärpät | Liiga | 48 | 21 | 16 | 10 | 2801 | 92 | 5 | 1.97 | .925 | 2 | 0 | 2 | 127 | 8 | 0 | 3.78 | .849 |
| 2017–18 | Oulun Kärpät | Liiga | 28 | 13 | 5 | 8 | 1559 | 58 | 3 | 2.23 | .910 | 3 | 1 | 2 | 119 | 6 | 0 | 3.04 | .860 |
| 2018–19 | Oulun Kärpät | Liiga | 21 | 16 | 3 | 2 | 1266 | 34 | 4 | 1.62 | .930 | — | — | — | — | — | — | — | — |
| 2019–20 | Krefeld Pinguine | DEL | 26 | 10 | 14 | 0 | 1494 | 70 | 1 | 2.81 | .921 | — | — | — | — | — | — | — | — |
| Liiga totals | | | 168 | 92 | 42 | 28 | 9666 | 313 | 23 | 1.94 | .930 | 8 | 1 | 7 | 409 | 21 | 0 | 3.06 | .865 |
| KHL totals | | | 19 | 7 | 6 | 5 | 1041 | 38 | 3 | 2.19 | .921 | — | — | — | — | — | — | — | — |
| NHL totals | | | 5 | 0 | 2 | 0 | 202 | 14 | 0 | 4.17 | .844 | — | — | — | — | — | — | — | — |
