= Ossi-Petteri Grönholm =

Finnish ice hockey player

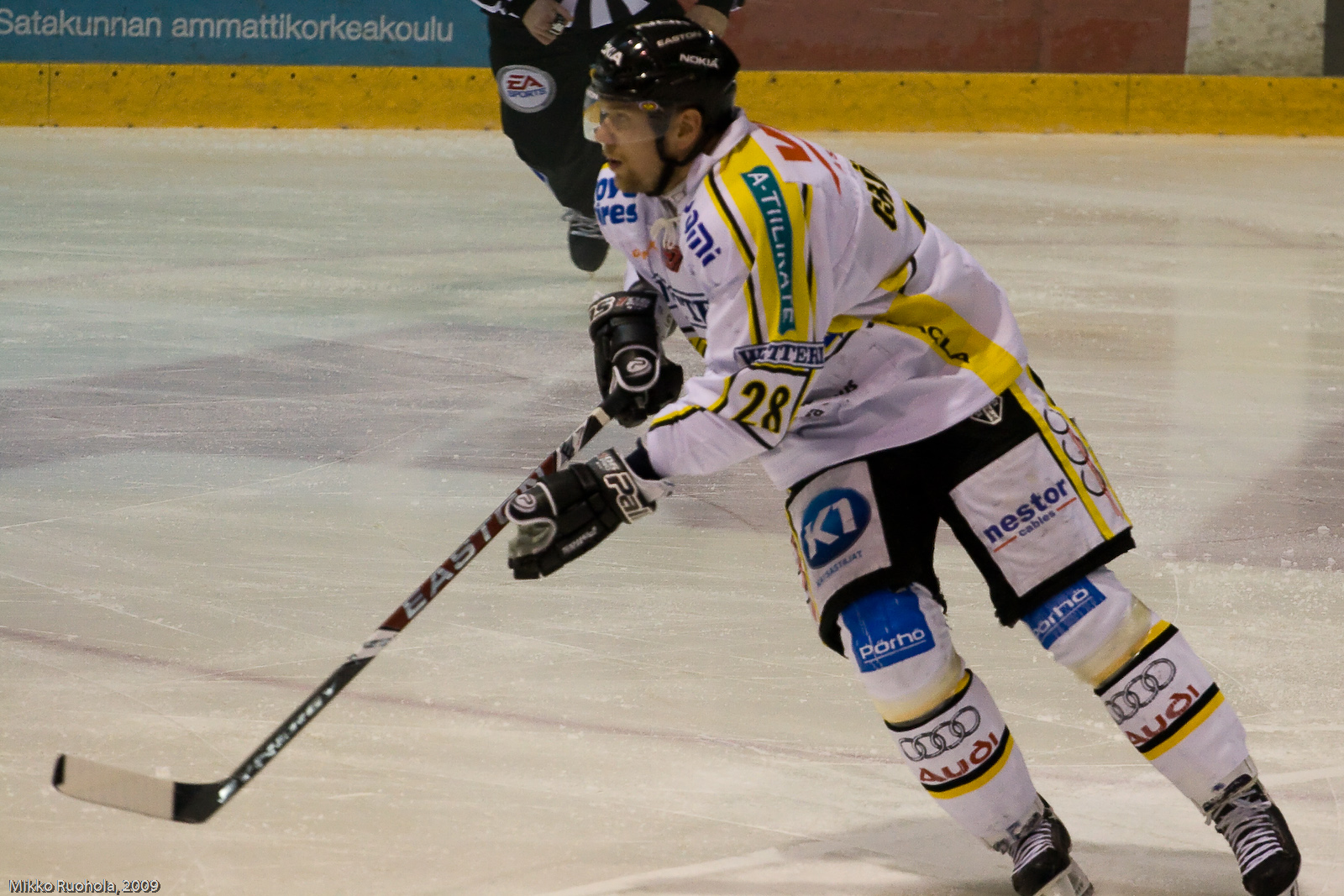
- Ossi-Petteri Grönholm
- Born: 17 September 1981 (age 45) Kotka, FIN
- Height: 5 ft 11 in (180 cm)
- Weight: 207 lb (94 kg; 14 st 11 lb)
- Position: Defense
- Shot: Left
- SEL team: Frölunda HC
- Playing career: 1999–2017

Ossi-Petteri Grönholm (born 17 September 1981 in Kotka, Finland) is a Finnish professional ice hockey defenceman. After playing for Pelicans and SaiPa of the Finnish SM-liiga and Frölunda HC of the Swedish Elite League, he signed with Oulun Kärpät for two years in spring 2008.

== Career statistics ==
| | | | Regular season | | | | | Playoffs |
| Season | Team | League | GP | G | A | Pts | PIM | GP | G | A | Pts | PIM |
|---|---|---|---|---|---|---|---|---|---|---|---|---|
| 1998–99 | Titaanit | 2. Divisioona | 13 | 0 | 2 | 2 | 6 | — | — | — | — | — |
| 1999–00 | Titaanit | Suomi-sarja | 33 | 2 | 17 | 19 | 62 | 3 | 1 | 0 | 1 | 10 |
| 2000–01 | Titaanit | Suomi-sarja | 33 | 10 | 12 | 22 | 101 | — | — | — | — | — |
| 2001–02 | Lahti Pelicans U20 | U20 SM-liiga | 22 | 5 | 8 | 13 | 26 | — | — | — | — | — |
| 2001–02 | Lahti Pelicans | SM-liiga | 18 | 0 | 1 | 1 | 6 | — | — | — | — | — |
| 2002–03 | Lahti Pelicans | SM-liiga | 33 | 0 | 0 | 0 | 22 | — | — | — | — | — |
| 2002–03 | KJT | Mestis | 13 | 3 | 4 | 7 | 28 | — | — | — | — | — |
| 2003–04 | Lahti Pelicans | SM-liiga | 47 | 2 | 3 | 5 | 74 | — | — | — | — | — |
| 2004–05 | Titaanit | Suomi-sarja | 14 | 4 | 14 | 18 | 64 | — | — | — | — | — |
| 2004–05 | SaiPa | SM-liiga | 28 | 1 | 3 | 4 | 36 | — | — | — | — | — |
| 2005–06 | SaiPa | SM-liiga | 53 | 2 | 7 | 9 | 73 | 8 | 0 | 2 | 2 | 6 |
| 2006–07 | SaiPa | SM-liiga | 41 | 1 | 10 | 11 | 70 | — | — | — | — | — |
| 2007–08 | SaiPa | SM-liiga | 45 | 4 | 13 | 17 | 62 | — | — | — | — | — |
| 2007–08 | Frölunda HC | Elitserien | 11 | 0 | 1 | 1 | 12 | 5 | 0 | 1 | 1 | 6 |
| 2008–09 | Kärpät | SM-liiga | 53 | 4 | 12 | 16 | 69 | 15 | 1 | 1 | 2 | 10 |
| 2009–10 | Kärpät | SM-liiga | 23 | 0 | 4 | 4 | 30 | — | — | — | — | — |
| 2009–10 | Brynäs IF | Elitserien | 16 | 1 | 0 | 1 | 34 | 5 | 0 | 0 | 0 | 8 |
| 2010–11 | Malmö Redhawks | HockeyAllsvenskan | 50 | 5 | 7 | 12 | 94 | — | — | — | — | — |
| 2011–12 | HPK | SM-liiga | 34 | 1 | 5 | 6 | 30 | — | — | — | — | — |
| 2012–13 | HPK | SM-liiga | 55 | 0 | 11 | 11 | 63 | 5 | 0 | 0 | 0 | 6 |
| 2013–14 | HPK | Liiga | 52 | 1 | 10 | 11 | 67 | 6 | 1 | 1 | 2 | 12 |
| 2014–15 | HPK | Liiga | 38 | 2 | 2 | 4 | 28 | — | — | — | — | — |
| 2015–16 | KooKoo | Liiga | 35 | 1 | 3 | 4 | 49 | — | — | — | — | — |
| 2016–17 | KooKoo | Liiga | 52 | 2 | 1 | 3 | 57 | — | — | — | — | — |
| SM-liiga totals | | | 607 | 21 | 85 | 106 | 736 | 34 | 2 | 4 | 6 | 34 |
