= Pekka Saarenheimo =

Finnish ice hockey player

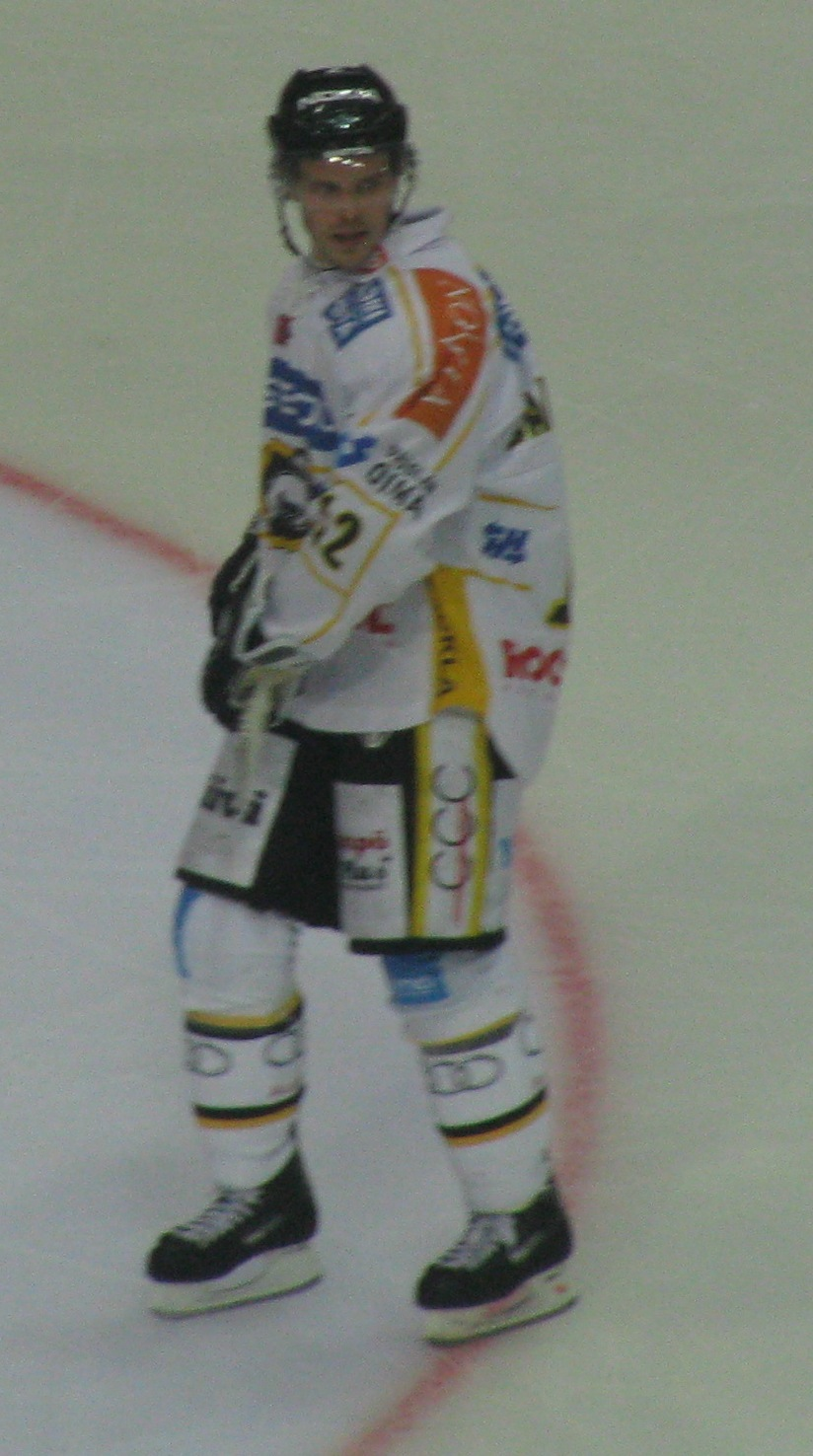
- image of Pekka Saarenheimo
- Born: May 6, 1982 (age 42); Oulunsalo, Finland
- Height: 5 ft 11 in (180 cm)
- Weight: 190 lb (86 kg; 13 st 8 lb)
- Position: Center
- Shot: Left
- Played for: Kärpät; Jukurit; Lukko; Södertälje SK; Tingsryds AIF; Lahti Pelicans
- NHL draft: Undrafted
- Playing career: 2001–2015

Pekka Saarenheimo (born May 6, 1982) is a Finnish professional ice hockey centre who currently plays for Södertälje SK of the Elitserien.

== Career statistics ==
| | | | Regular season | | | | | Playoffs |
| Season | Team | League | GP | G | A | Pts | PIM | GP | G | A | Pts | PIM |
|---|---|---|---|---|---|---|---|---|---|---|---|---|
| 1997–98 | Kärpät U16 | Jr. C SM-sarja Q | 9 | 10 | 7 | 17 | 18 | — | — | — | — | — |
| 1997–98 | Kärpät U16 | Jr. C SM-sarja | 20 | 26 | 15 | 41 | 10 | — | — | — | — | — |
| 1998–99 | Kärpät U18 | Jr. B SM-sarja | 33 | 18 | 14 | 32 | 30 | — | — | — | — | — |
| 1999–00 | Kärpät U18 | Jr. B SM-sarja | 9 | 12 | 7 | 19 | 10 | 6 | 10 | 1 | 11 | 2 |
| 1999–00 | Kärpät U20 | Jr. A SM-liiga | 32 | 8 | 11 | 19 | 46 | — | — | — | — | — |
| 2000–01 | Kärpät U20 | Jr. A SM-liiga | 39 | 27 | 22 | 49 | 28 | 6 | 1 | 0 | 1 | 0 |
| 2000–01 | Kärpät | Liiga | 7 | 0 | 1 | 1 | 0 | 4 | 0 | 0 | 0 | 0 |
| 2001–02 | Kärpät U20 | Jr. A SM-liiga | 19 | 9 | 12 | 21 | 8 | 2 | 1 | 2 | 3 | 2 |
| 2001–02 | Kärpät | Liiga | 27 | 2 | 4 | 6 | 4 | 4 | 0 | 0 | 0 | 2 |
| 2001–02 | Jukurit | Mestis | 7 | 3 | 0 | 3 | 0 | — | — | — | — | — |
| 2002–03 | Kärpät | Liiga | 56 | 7 | 8 | 15 | 28 | 15 | 4 | 2 | 6 | 2 |
| 2003–04 | Kärpät | Liiga | 52 | 9 | 13 | 22 | 42 | 15 | 0 | 2 | 2 | 24 |
| 2004–04 | Kärpät | Liiga | 56 | 15 | 20 | 35 | 22 | 12 | 1 | 3 | 4 | 2 |
| 2005–06 | Kärpät | Liiga | 50 | 12 | 8 | 20 | 26 | 9 | 0 | 1 | 1 | 6 |
| 2006–07 | Lukko | Liiga | 54 | 19 | 27 | 46 | 64 | 3 | 0 | 0 | 0 | 0 |
| 2007–08 | Lukko | Liiga | 54 | 10 | 23 | 33 | 56 | 3 | 1 | 0 | 1 | 0 |
| 2008–09 | Lukko | Liiga | 58 | 20 | 23 | 43 | 89 | — | — | — | — | — |
| 2009–10 | Kärpät | Liiga | 49 | 4 | 8 | 12 | 28 | 9 | 0 | 2 | 2 | 6 |
| 2010–11 | Södertälje SK | SHL | 22 | 0 | 3 | 3 | 6 | — | — | — | — | — |
| 2010–11 | Tingsryds AIF | Allsvenskan | 3 | 0 | 0 | 0 | 4 | — | — | — | — | — |
| 2011–12 | Kärpät | Liiga | 54 | 4 | 7 | 11 | 32 | 9 | 0 | 2 | 2 | 2 |
| 2012–13 | Lahti Pelicans | Liiga | 53 | 6 | 15 | 21 | 34 | — | — | — | — | — |
| 2013–14 | Lahti Pelicans | Liiga | 56 | 11 | 17 | 28 | 38 | 8 | 1 | 0 | 1 | 0 |
| 2014–15 | Lahti Pelicans | Liiga | 32 | 3 | 5 | 8 | 20 | — | — | — | — | — |
| Liiga totals | | | 658 | 122 | 179 | 301 | 483 | 96 | 9 | 13 | 22 | 50 |
