= Jan Latvala =

Finnish ice hockey player

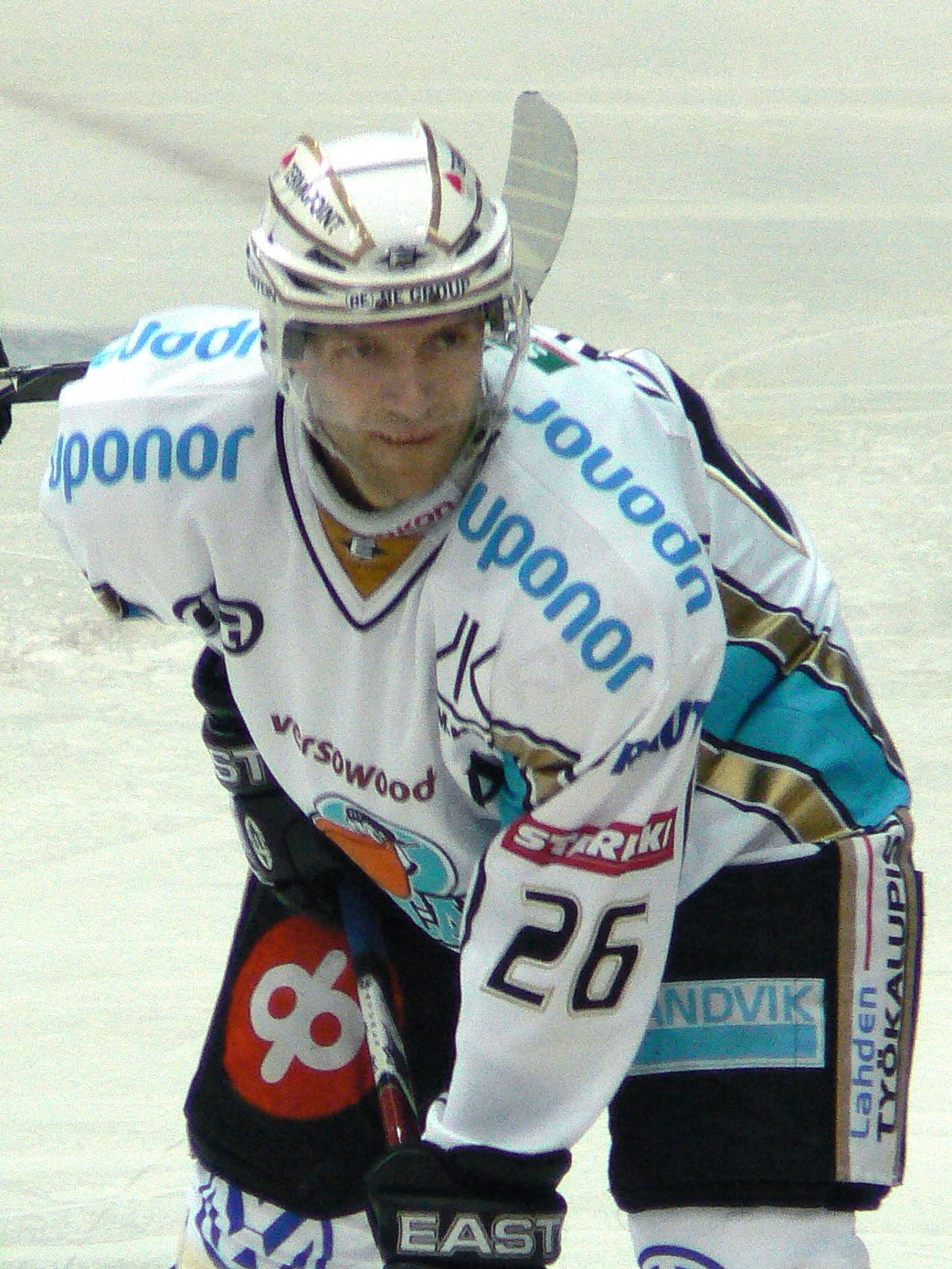
- Born: June 10, 1972 (age 54) Jyväskylä, Finland
- Height: 5 ft 10 in (178 cm)
- Weight: 167 lb (76 kg; 11 st 13 lb)
- Position: Defence
- Shot: Left
- SM-liiga team Former teams: Pelicans; JYP; Jokerit
- Playing career: 1992–2016

Jan Latvala (born June 10, 1972) is a retired Finnish professional ice hockey defenceman who last played for Pelicans of the SM-liiga. Latvala is current record holder of most played regular season games in SM-liiga with a total of 1,230 games. He surpassed Erik Hämäläinen's record on February 18, 2012, playing his 1,002nd game.

== Career statistics ==
			Regular season					Playoffs
Season	Team	League	GP	G	A	Pts	PIM	GP	G	A	Pts	PIM
1992–93	JYP	SM-l	2	0	0	0	0	—	—	—	—	—
1993–94	JYP	SM-l	30	4	9	13	10	3	0	0	0	2
1993–94	Hermes	Fin.1	17	0	2	2	6	—	—	—	—	—
1994–95	JYP	SM-l	50	3	9	12	40	4	0	2	2	2
1995–96	JYP	SM-l	50	3	14	17	30	—	—	—	—	—
1996–97	JYP	SM-l	49	7	22	29	24	4	1	1	2	2
1997–98	JYP	SM-l	48	9	10	19	26	—	—	—	—	—
1998–99	JYP	SM-l	54	1	11	12	24	3	0	1	1	2
1999–00	Pelicans	SM-l	54	3	12	15	24	—	—	—	—	—
2000–01	Pelicans	SM-l	56	10	25	35	14	3	0	0	0	0
2001–02	Pelicans	SM-l	56	5	24	29	22	3	0	0	0	0
2002–03	Pelicans	SM-l	52	8	16	24	24	—	—	—	—	—
2003–04	Jokerit	SM-l	55	4	8	12	14	8	1	2	3	4
2004–05	Jokerit	SM-l	56	6	6	12	18	11	0	0	0	0
2005–06	Jokerit	SM-l	56	3	8	11	24	—	—	—	—	—
2006–07	Jokerit	SM-l	55	3	5	8	26	7	0	0	0	2
2007–08	Pelicans	SM-l	56	8	14	22	18	6	4	1	5	6
2008–09	Pelicans	SM-l	57	9	17	26	14	10	4	0	4	6
2009–10	Pelicans	SM-l	56	3	25	28	46	—	—	—	—	—
2010–11	Pelicans	SM-l	60	5	8	13	18	—	—	—	—	—
2011–12	Pelicans	SM-l	60	7	24	31	34	16	4	9	13	6
2012–13	Pelicans	SM-l	53	5	8	13	16	–	–	–	–	–
2013-14	Pelicans	SM-l	60	7	17	24	28	8	1	2	3	6
2014–15	Pelicans	SM-l	45	2	15	17	16	–	–	–	–	–
2015–16	Pelicans	SM-l	60	0	10	10	18	9	1	0	0	4
SM-liiga totals			1012	101	267	368	450	89	16	22	38	36
