= Aki Uusikartano =

Finnish ice hockey player

- Born: June 13, 1977 (age 48) Lieto, Finland
- Height: 186 cm (6 ft 1 in)
- Weight: 81 kg (179 lb; 12 st 11 lb)
- Position: Forward
- Shot: Left
- Played for: TUTO Hockey; Kokkolan Hermes; Lahti Pelicans; HIFK; Lukko; SaiPa; Ässät; HPK; HC TPS
- Playing career: 1997–2014

Aki Uusikartano (born June 13, 1977) is a retired Finnish professional ice hockey forward who played for Ässät of the SM-liiga.

== Career statistics ==
			Regular season					Playoffs
Season	Team	League	GP	G	A	Pts	PIM	GP	G	A	Pts	PIM
1994–95	HC TPS U20	U20 SM-liiga	27	2	2	4	8	—	—	—	—	—
1995–96	TUTO Hockey U20	U20 I-Divisioona	14	6	10	16	8	—	—	—	—	—
1996–97	TUTO Hockey U20	U20 I-Divisioona	4	0	1	1	4	—	—	—	—	—
1996–97	TUTO Hockey	I-Divisioona	36	13	21	34	16	—	—	—	—	—
1997–98	Kokkolan Hermes	I-Divisioona	41	14	36	50	26	8	1	5	6	2
1998–99	Lahti Pelicans	I-Divisioona	47	12	27	39	26	—	—	—	—	—
1999–00	HIFK	SM-liiga	54	4	14	18	18	9	2	1	3	0
2000–01	HIFK	SM-liiga	48	4	10	14	14	—	—	—	—	—
2001–02	Lukko	SM-liiga	55	11	10	21	55	—	—	—	—	—
2002–03	SaiPa	SM-liiga	55	12	16	28	40	—	—	—	—	—
2003–04	SaiPa	SM-liiga	23	4	6	10	14	—	—	—	—	—
2004–05	Porin Ässät	SM-liiga	52	5	17	22	22	2	0	0	0	0
2005–06	Porin Ässät	SM-liiga	52	7	27	34	62	13	1	5	6	4
2006–07	HPK	SM-liiga	55	9	31	40	42	9	1	1	2	4
2007–08	HPK	SM-liiga	21	3	8	11	14	—	—	—	—	—
2007–08	HC TPS	SM-liiga	7	1	3	4	6	2	1	1	2	2
2008–09	HC TPS	SM-liiga	57	11	20	31	53	8	1	4	5	10
2009–10	HC TPS	SM-liiga	57	16	19	35	24	8	2	0	2	0
2010–11	Porin Ässät	SM-liiga	60	10	27	37	36	6	0	4	4	4
2011–12	Porin Ässät	SM-liiga	59	6	20	26	36	2	0	0	0	2
2012–13	Porin Ässät	SM-liiga	53	11	10	21	16	15	3	7	10	2
2013–14	Lukko	Liiga	53	5	10	15	16	13	1	3	4	6
SM-liiga totals			761	119	248	367	468	87	12	26	38	34
