= Ilmari Pitkänen =

Finnish ice hockey player

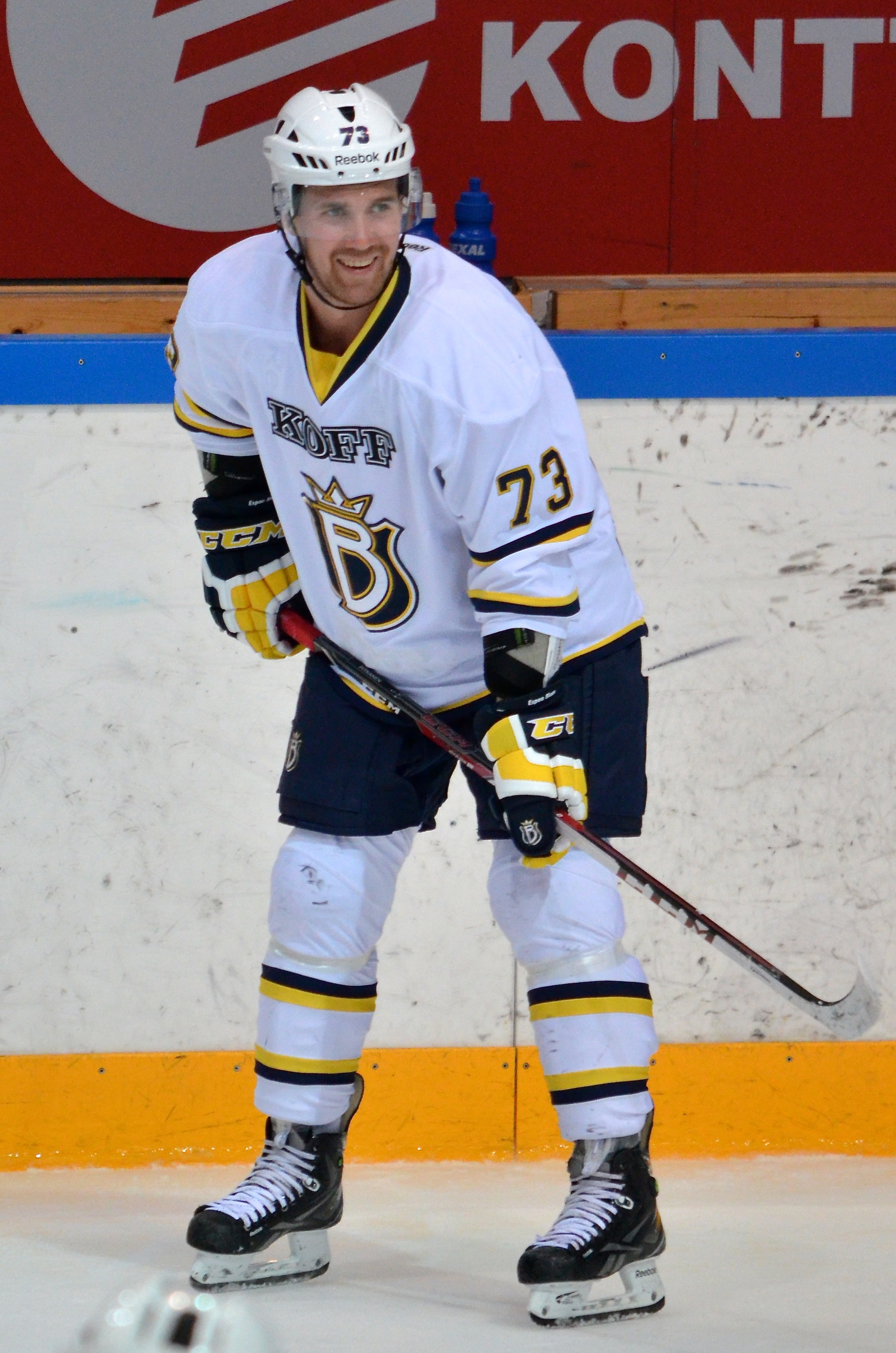
- Born: July 18, 1990 (age 34); Viljakkala, Finland
- Height: 6 ft 0 in (183 cm)
- Weight: 192 lb (87 kg; 13 st 10 lb)
- Position: Left wing
- Shoots: Left
- Liiga team Former teams: SaiPa; Jokerit; Espoo Blues
- Playing career: 2008–present

Ilmari Pitkänen (born July 18, 1990) is a Finnish professional ice hockey Left wing who currently plays for SaiPa in the Finnish Liiga. He joined SaiPa on a two-year contract from Espoo Blues on April 16, 2014.

== Career statistics ==
			Regular season					Playoffs
Season	Team	League	GP	G	A	Pts	PIM	GP	G	A	Pts	PIM
2005–06	Jokerit U16	U16 SM-sarja Q	10	9	13	22	6	—	—	—	—	—
2005–06	Jokerit U16	U16 SM-sarja	13	7	12	19	36	6	6	3	9	14
2006–07	Jokerit U18	U18 SM-sarja Q	9	6	8	14	12	—	—	—	—	—
2006–07	Jokerit U18	U18 SM-sarja	25	6	13	19	36	3	1	0	1	0
2007–08	Jokerit U18	U18 SM-sarja	11	6	7	13	12	4	6	2	8	0
2007–08	Jokerit U20	U20 SM-liiga	39	8	17	25	28	4	1	2	3	2
2008–09	Jokerit U20	U20 SM-liiga	29	9	19	28	124	4	1	2	3	4
2008–09	Jokerit	SM-liiga	7	0	0	0	31	—	—	—	—	—
2008–09	Suomi U20	Mestis	10	3	3	6	32	—	—	—	—	—
2009–10	Jokerit U20	U20 SM-liiga	21	11	13	24	51	4	0	1	1	2
2009–10	Jokerit	SM-liiga	16	0	0	0	0	—	—	—	—	—
2009–10	Kiekko-Vantaa	Mestis	8	1	3	4	4	—	—	—	—	—
2009–10	Suomi U20	Mestis	4	0	0	0	0	—	—	—	—	—
2010–11	Jokerit U20	U20 SM-liiga	5	3	3	6	29	6	1	1	2	22
2010–11	Jokerit	SM-liiga	33	1	1	2	6	—	—	—	—	—
2010–11	Kiekko-Vantaa	Mestis	11	1	6	7	2	—	—	—	—	—
2011–12	Jokipojat	Mestis	40	10	11	21	108	12	4	3	7	6
2012–13	Jokipojat	Mestis	36	5	20	25	50	—	—	—	—	—
2012–13	Espoo Blues	SM-liiga	24	2	2	4	14	—	—	—	—	—
2013–14	Espoo Blues	Liiga	54	7	5	12	72	7	0	1	1	0
2014–15	SaiPa	Liiga	19	0	0	0	39	—	—	—	—	—
2014–15	Espoo Blues	Liiga	25	2	2	4	18	1	0	0	0	0
2015–16	Espoo Blues	SM-liiga	50	7	13	20	65	—	—	—	—	—
2015–16	Jokipojat	Mestis	7	5	0	5	10	—	—	—	—	—
2016–17	Lukko	Liiga	49	6	12	18	57	—	—	—	—	—
2017–18	Mikkelin Jukurit	Liiga	46	5	4	9	37	—	—	—	—	—
2018–19	HIFK	Liiga	48	4	3	7	4	4	0	1	1	2
2019–20	Kiekko-Espoo	Suomi-sarja	31	21	31	52	4	5	3	2	5	10
SM-liiga totals			371	34	42	76	343	12	0	2	2	2
Mestis totals			116	25	43	68	206	12	4	3	7	6
