= Jere Myllyniemi =

Finnish ice hockey player

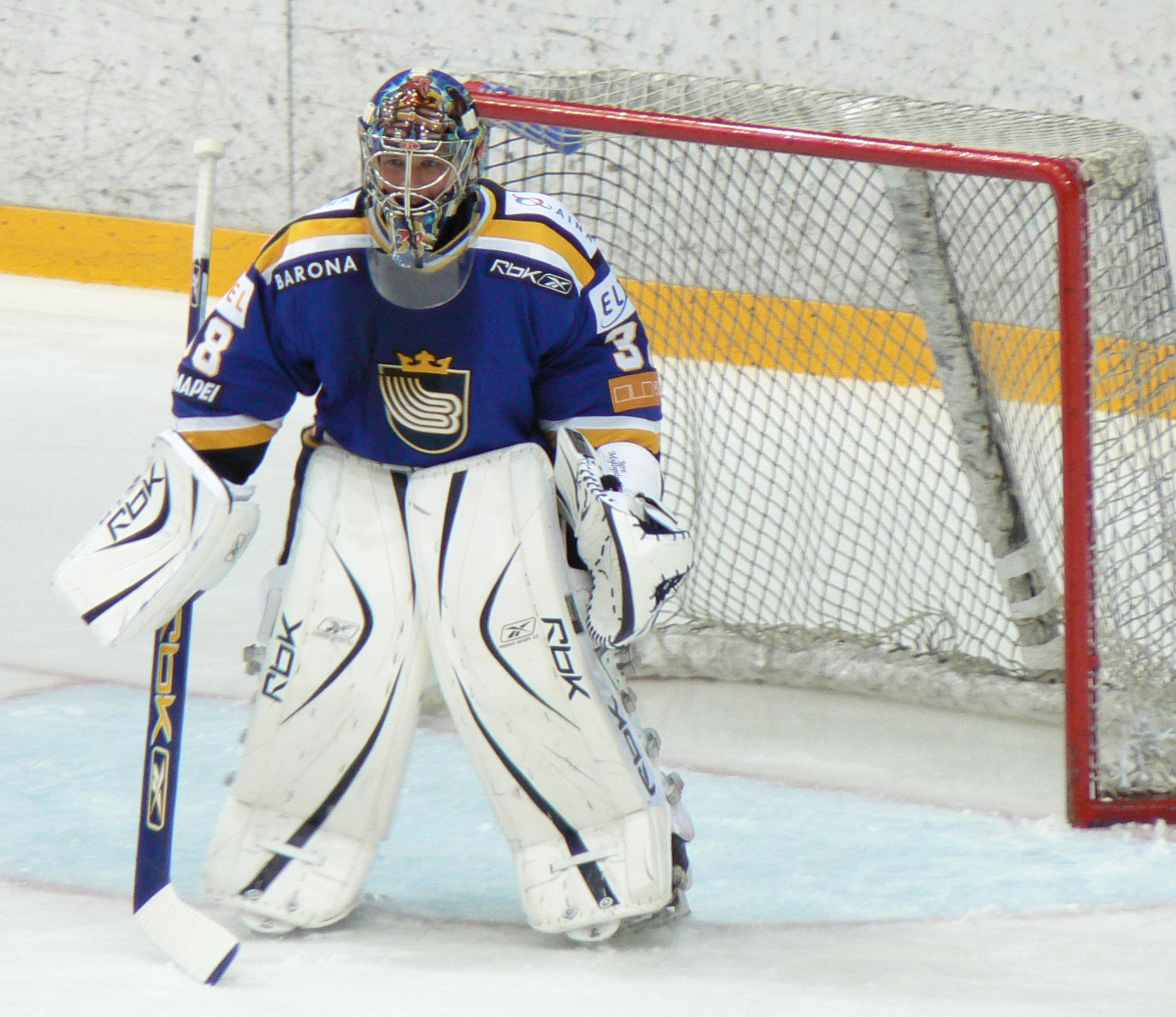
- Born: January 24, 1983 (age 43) Kangasala, FIN
- Height: 6 ft 0 in (183 cm)
- Weight: 185 lb (84 kg; 13 st 3 lb)
- Position: Goaltender
- Caught: Left
- Played for: Blues; Lukko; Luleå HF; Rögle BK; SaiPa; Pelicans; HPK; Ilves; HIFK
- NHL draft: Undrafted
- Playing career: 2002–2018

Jere Myllyniemi (born January 24, 1983) is a Finnish former professional ice hockey goaltender. He is currently working as a goaltending coach of KOOVEE of Mestis.

== Career ==
Myllyniemi began his career with KOOVEE in the Suomi-sarja. He made his SM-liiga debut for Blues during the 2002–03 SM-liiga season. He moves to Sweden in 2005 to play for Rögle BK in the HockeyAllsvenskan for one season. He returned to Finland the following season with Lukko.

In the 2007–08 season, Myllyniemi returned to Blues for a brief spell before going back to Sweden with Luleå HF of the Elitserien. He then joined Rögle BK for the 2008–09 Elitserien season, but left the team on December 27, 2008, and moved to Leksands IF.

Myllyniemi came back to the SM-liiga in 2009 with SaiPa as their starting goaltender. He moved to Pelicans in 2012 and remained for three seasons before joining HPK in 2015. In the 2016–17 Liiga season, he had brief spells with Ilves, Pelicans and HIFK.
