= Jani Nieminen =

Finnish ice hockey player

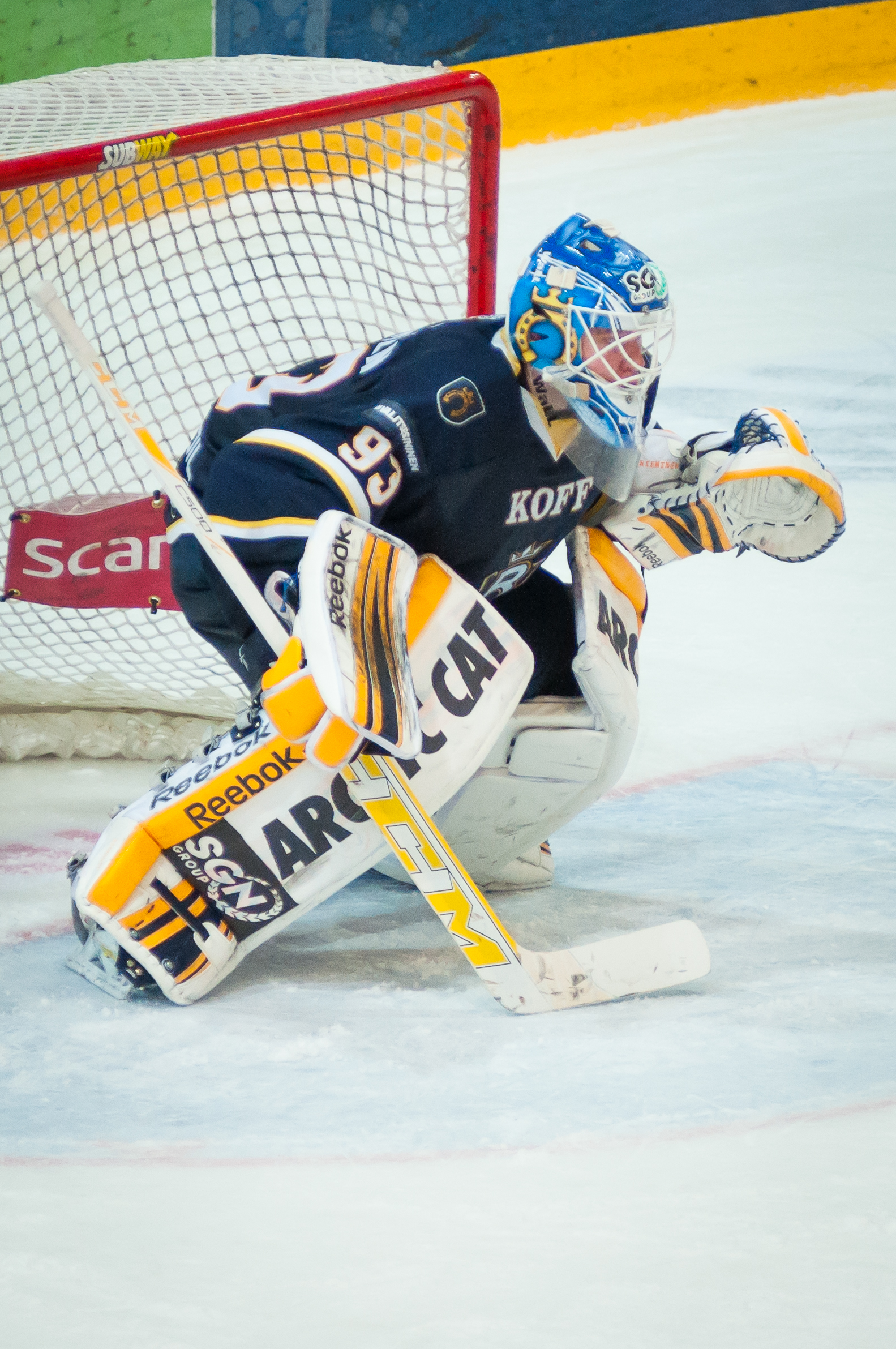
- Born: July 28, 1987 (age 39) Helsinki, Finland
- Height: 5 ft 10 in (178 cm)
- Weight: 190 lb (86 kg; 13 st 8 lb)
- Position: Goaltender
- Catches: Left
- DEL team Former teams: Fischtown Pinguins; HIFK; Tappara; SaiPa; Espoo Blues
- Playing career: 2005–present

Jani Nieminen (born July 28, 1987) is a Finnish ice hockey goaltender who currently plays professionally for the Fischtown Pinguins in Germany.

== Career ==
A product of Helsinki-based club HIFK, Nieminen played for his hometown team until 2010, but also had some loan stints during his time at HIFK, allowing him to earn playing time in Finland's second division.

From 2010 to 2012, he played for Tappara, followed by stints at fellow Liiga sides SaiPa and Espoo Blues. In June 2016, he was signed by the Fischtown Pinguins, a Bremerhaven-based team from the German top-flight Deutsche Eishockey Liga (DEL).
