= Antti Erkinjuntti =

Finnish ice hockey player

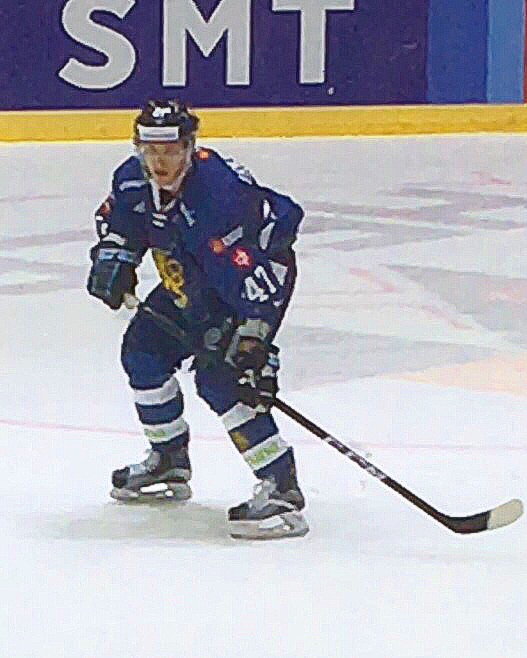
- Born: 30 May 1986 (age 40) Rovaniemi, Finland
- Height: 5 ft 10 in (178 cm)
- Weight: 179 lb (81 kg; 12 st 11 lb)
- Position: Forward
- Shoots: Left
- team Former teams: Free agent RoKi; Hokki; TPS; Tappara; Lahti Pelicans; SCL Tigers; Vaasan Sport; HK Dukla Michalovce
- Playing career: 2004–present

Antti Erkinjuntti (born 30 May 1986) is a Finnish ice hockey player. He is currently a free agent.

== Career statistics ==
=== Regular season and playoffs ===
			Regular season					Playoffs
Season	Team	League	GP	G	A	Pts	PIM	GP	G	A	Pts	PIM
2020–21	HK Dukla Michalovce	Slovak	24	9	14	23	8	12	6	0	6	8
2021–22	HK Dukla Michalovce	Slovak	38	6	11	17	18	5	0	2	2	0
Liiga totals			652	108	258	366	227	101	16	29	45	32
