= Eetu Pöysti =

Finnish ice hockey player

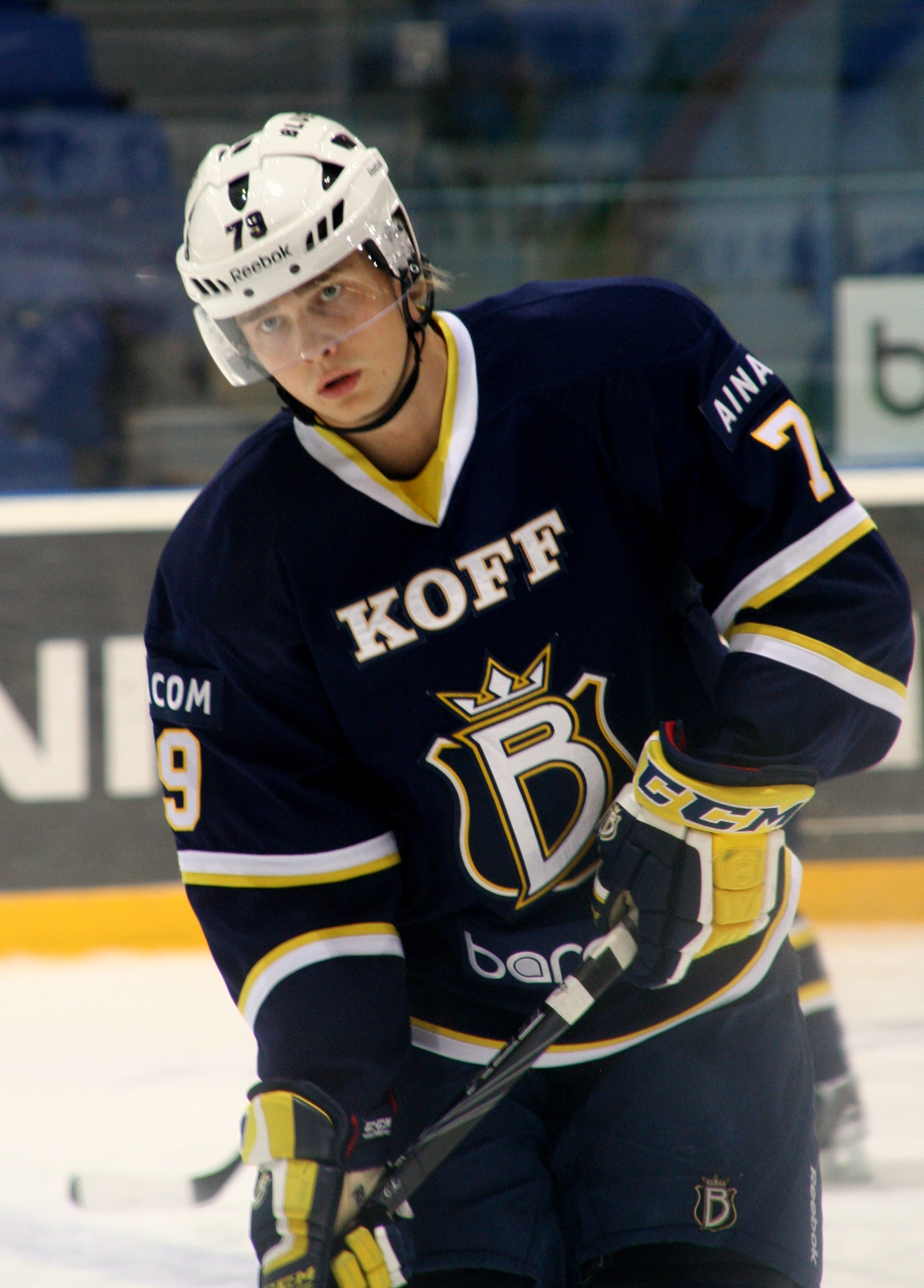
- Born: 16 January 1989 (age 36); Helsinki, Finland
- Height: 6 ft 0 in (183 cm)
- Weight: 192 lb (87 kg; 13 st 10 lb)
- Position: Forward
- Shoots: Right
- Liiga team Former teams: KooKoo; HIFK; Espoo Blues; Jokerit; HC Kunlun Red Star
- Playing career: 2007–present

Eetu Pöysti (born 16 January 1989) is a Finnish professional ice hockey forward who currently plays for KooKoo in the Liiga.

== Playing career ==
Pöysti started in the youth system of Helsinki-based club HIFK and made his debut on the club's senior team in Finland's top-tier Liiga during the 2007–08 season. In 2010, he captured the Liiga title with HIFK. Following the 2011–12 season, Pöysti transferred to fellow Liiga outfit Espoo Blues, where he would spend two years.

He joined Jokerit for their maiden season in the Kontinental Hockey League (KHL) from rivals Espoo Blues on 7 April 2014. After two years at the club, Pöysti signed with newly founded HC Red Star Kunlun, the first Chinese member of the KHL, in July 2016.
