= Aleksi Laakso =

Finnish ice hockey player

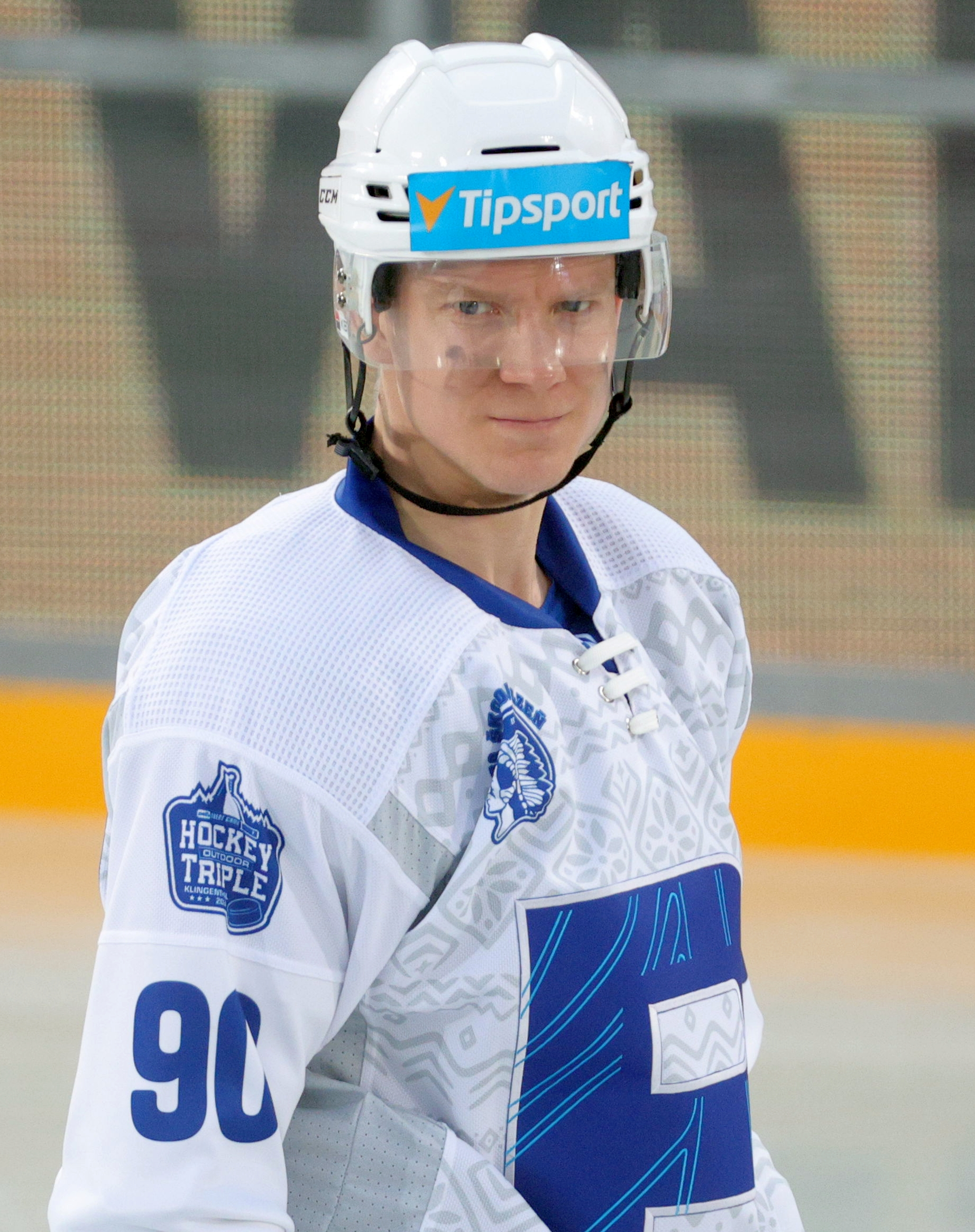
- Born: March 16, 1990 (age 35) Seinajoki, Finland
- Height: 5 ft 10 in (178 cm)
- Weight: 169 lb (77 kg; 12 st 1 lb)
- Position: Defence
- Shoots: Left
- Liiga team Former teams: Ässät; Espoo Blues; Vaasan Sport; HPK; Graz 99ers Rungsted Ishockey Klub; HIFK Hockey; Lahti Pelicans
- Playing career: 2009–present

Aleksi Jussi Hermanni Laakso is a Finnish professional ice hockey defenceman who currently plays for Ässät of the Liiga.
