= Jesse Mankinen =

Finnish ice hockey player

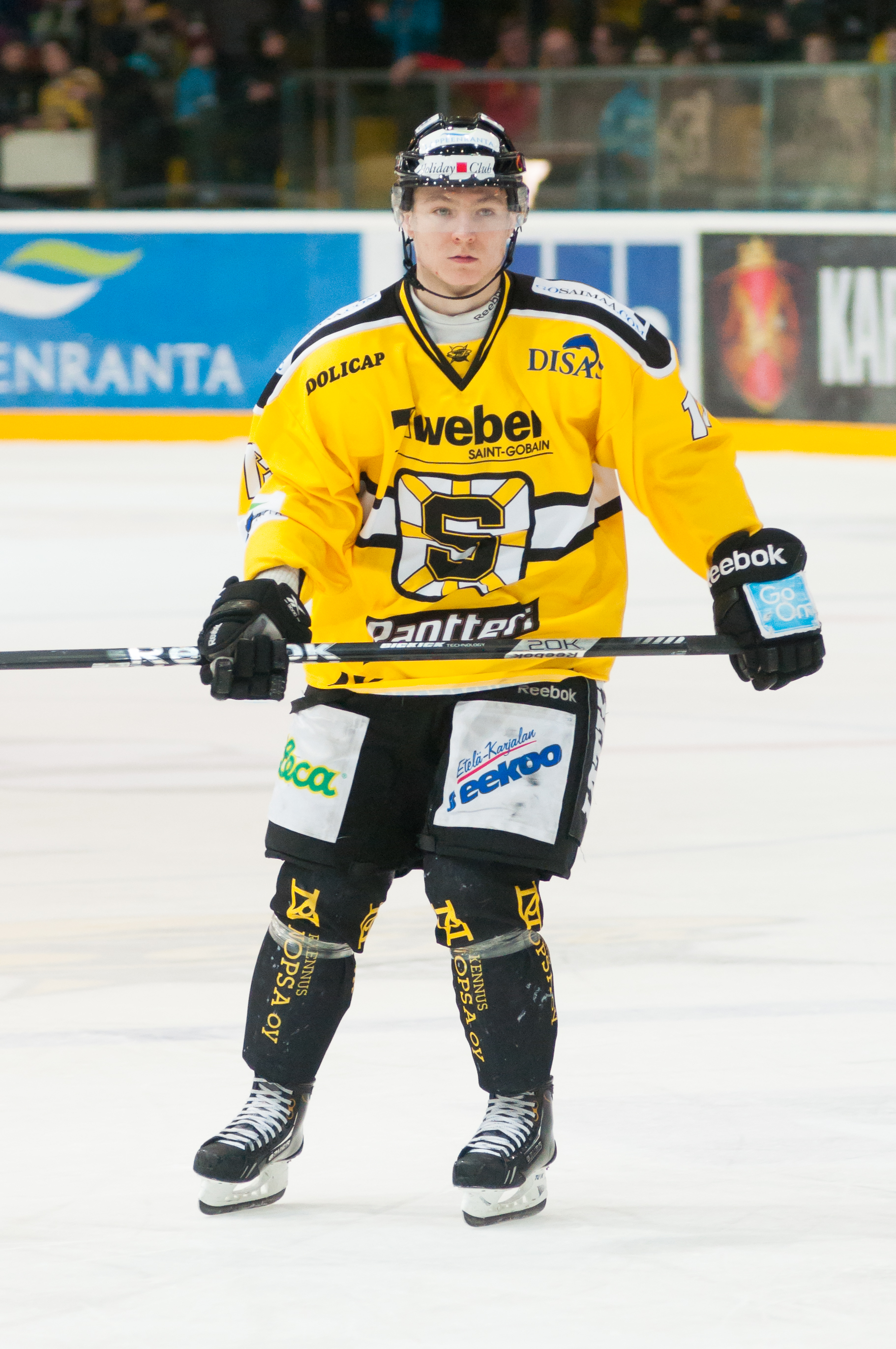
- Born: May 20, 1991 (age 33); Lappeenranta, Finland
- Height: 5 ft 10 in (178 cm)
- Weight: 181 lb (82 kg; 12 st 13 lb)
- Position: Forward
- Shoots: Right
- NL team Former teams: HC Davos; SaiPa; KalPa; HC Vityaz
- Playing career: 2008–present

Jesse Mankinen (born May 20, 1991) is a Finnish professional ice hockey player who currently plays for HC Davos in the National League (NL).

He previously spent the beginning of his career exclusively in his native Finland playing with SaiPa and KalPa of the Liiga. On May 3, 2017, after completing his second season in 2016–17 with KalPa, ManKinen left as a free agent seeking a new challenge in agreeing to a two-year contract with Russian club, HC Vityaz of the Kontinental Hockey League (KHL) on May 3, 2017.
