= Anssi Laine =

Finnish ice hockey coach

- Born: Finland
- Occupation(s): Head Coach, KalPa
- Predecessor: Jari Laukkanen

Anssi Laine is a Finnish ice hockey coach. He is currently the head coach for KalPa of the Finnish Liiga.

On February 27, 2014, Laine replaced Jari Laukkanen to take over the head coaching duties for KalPa.
