= Ari Vallin =

Finnish ice hockey player (born 1978)

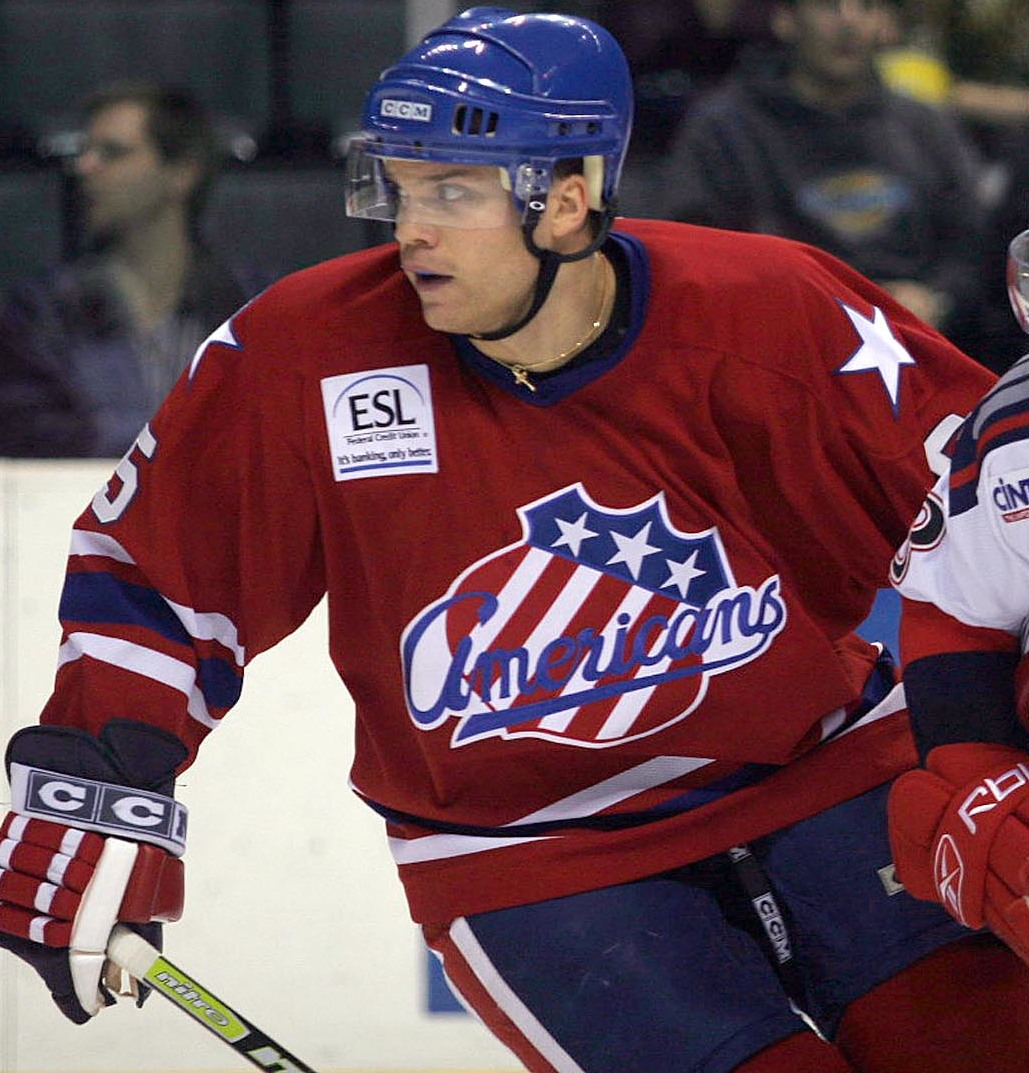
- Vallin with the Rochester Americans in 2006
- Born: March 21, 1978 (age 48) Ylöjärvi, Finland
- Height: 5 ft 11 in (180 cm)
- Weight: 194 lb (88 kg; 13 st 12 lb)
- Position: Defence
- Shot: Left
- Played for: Tappara; HPK; Jokerit; Oulun Kärpät; Rochester Americans; Frölunda HC; Lokomotiv Yaroslavl; Färjestad BK; HIFK; Espoo Blues; HC Sparta Praha; KooKoo
- National team: Finland
- NHL draft: Undrafted
- Playing career: 1996–2016

Ari Vallin (born March 21, 1978) is a Finnish former professional ice hockey defenceman.

In summer 2015, he was transferred from Oulun Kärpät to KooKoo.

In the 2003–2004 SM-liiga playoff finals in Finland against TPS, Vallin was the player who scored the sudden death goal in overtime, therefore making the Kärpät team the new champions.
