= Jari Laukkanen (ice hockey) =

Finnish ice hockey player

- Born: June 21, 1967 (age 58) Helsinki, Finland
- Height: 5 ft 10 in (178 cm)
- Weight: 179 lb (81 kg; 12 st 11 lb)
- Position: Right wing
- Shot: Left
- Played for: SM-liiga; HIFK; Oulun Kärpät; KalPa
- NHL draft: Undrafted
- Playing career: 1987–2002

Jari Laukkanen (born June 21, 1967) is a Finnish former professional ice hockey defenceman.

Laukkanen played 12 seasons in the SM-liiga, registering 138 goals, 195 assists, 333 points, and 301 penalty minutes, while playing 561 games with three teams between 1988–89 and 2001–02.

On August 29, 2012, Laukkanen replaced Tuomas Tuokkola as the head coach for KalPa. The following season, on February 27, 2014, Laukkanen was replaced mid-season by Anssi Laine.

== Career statistics ==
			Regular season					Playoffs
Season	Team	League	GP	G	A	Pts	PIM	GP	G	A	Pts	PIM
1986–87	HIFK U20	Jr. A SM-sarja	34	33	42	75	46	4	3	3	6	8
1987–88	JoKP	I-Divisioona	44	25	30	55	12	—	—	—	—	—
1988–89	HIFK	Liiga	44	13	13	26	20	2	1	0	1	0
1989–90	HIFK	Liiga	44	8	14	22	32	2	0	1	1	0
1990–91	KalPa	Liiga	44	16	16	32	32	8	1	2	3	4
1991–92	KalPa	Liiga	44	19	19	38	17	—	—	—	—	—
1992–93	KalPa	Liiga	48	18	20	38	26	—	—	—	—	—
1993–94	HIFK	Liiga	47	6	19	25	10	3	0	0	0	2
1994–95	HIFK	Liiga	50	15	19	34	30	3	0	0	0	0
1995–96	HIFK	Liiga	45	6	7	13	48	3	0	2	2	2
1995–96	SaPKo	I-Divisioona	1	0	0	0	0	—	—	—	—	—
1996–97	HIFK	Liiga	50	16	26	42	28	—	—	—	—	—
1996–97	SaPKo	I-Divisioona	3	0	0	0	0	—	—	—	—	—
1997–98	HIFK	Liiga	35	5	12	17	8	—	—	—	—	—
1997–98	Kärpät	I-Divisioona	12	6	10	16	10	—	—	—	—	—
1998–99	Kärpät	I-Divisioona	47	21	44	65	40	5	1	2	3	8
1999–00	Kärpät	I-Divisioona	47	19	54	73	56	—	—	—	—	—
2000–01	Kärpät	Liiga	54	8	20	28	24	9	1	1	2	2
2001–02	Kärpät	Liiga	56	8	10	18	26	4	0	0	0	0
Liiga totals			561	138	195	333	301	34	3	6	9	10
