= Filip Riska =

Finnish ice hockey player

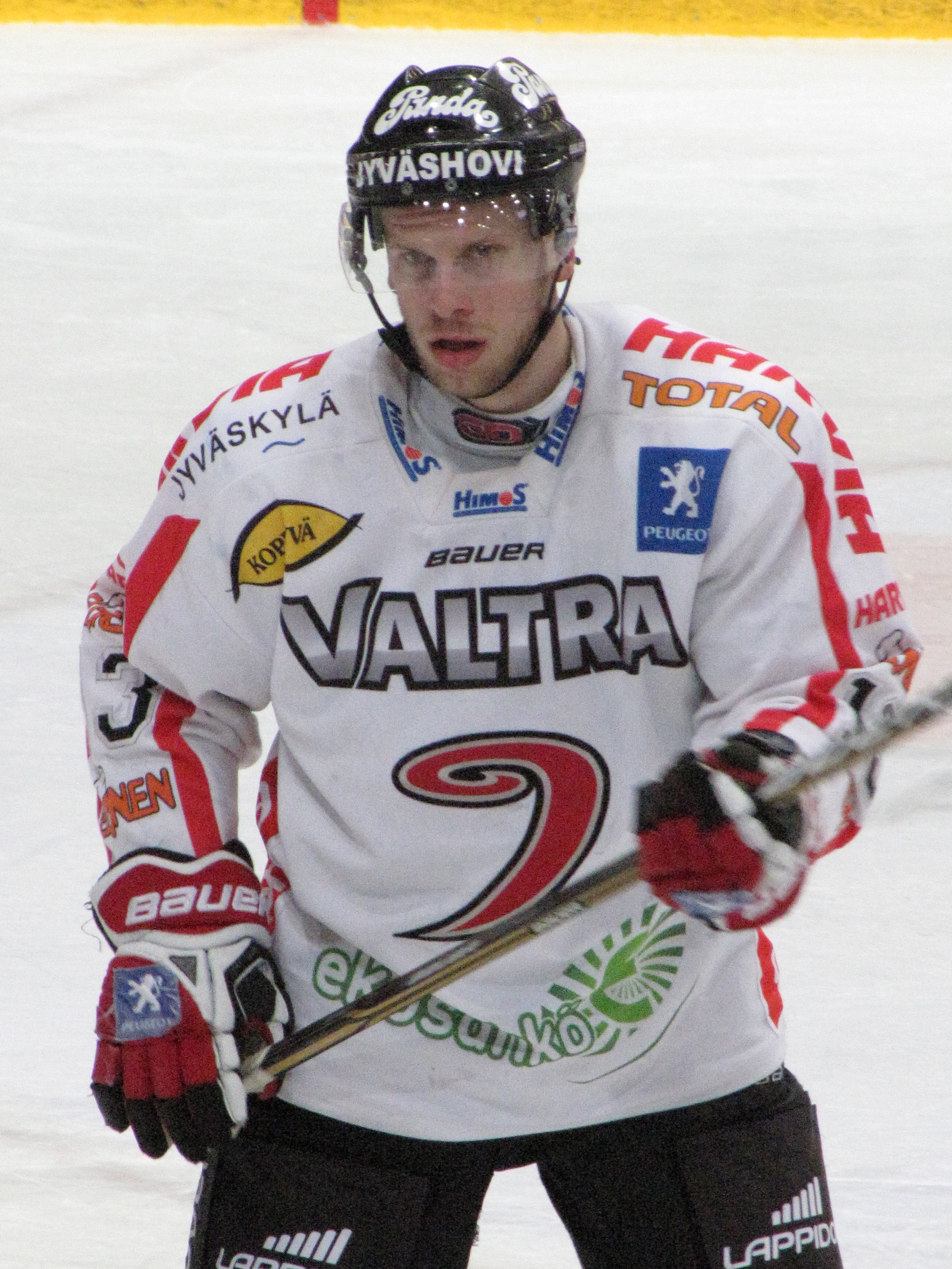
- Born: 13 May 1985 (age 39); Jakobstad, Finland
- Height: 6 ft 1 in (185 cm)
- Weight: 192 lb (87 kg; 13 st 10 lb)
- Position: Forward
- Shot: Left
- Liiga team Former teams: Lukko; JYP
- Playing career: 2004–2022

Filip Riska (born 13 May 1985) is a Finnish professional ice hockey player currently playing for Sport of the Finnish Liiga.
