= Teemu Nurmi =

Finnish ice hockey player

- Born: 24 February 1985 (age 40); Tampere, Finland
- Height: 6 ft 1 in (185 cm)
- Weight: 194 lb (88 kg; 13 st 12 lb)
- Position: Forward
- Shoots: Right
- Liiga team Former teams: Lukko; Tappara; Espoo Blues
- Playing career: 2003–present

Teemu Nurmi (born 24 February 1985) is a Finnish ice hockey player currently playing for Lukko of the Finnish Liiga.
