= Teemu Rinkinen =

Finnish ice hockey player

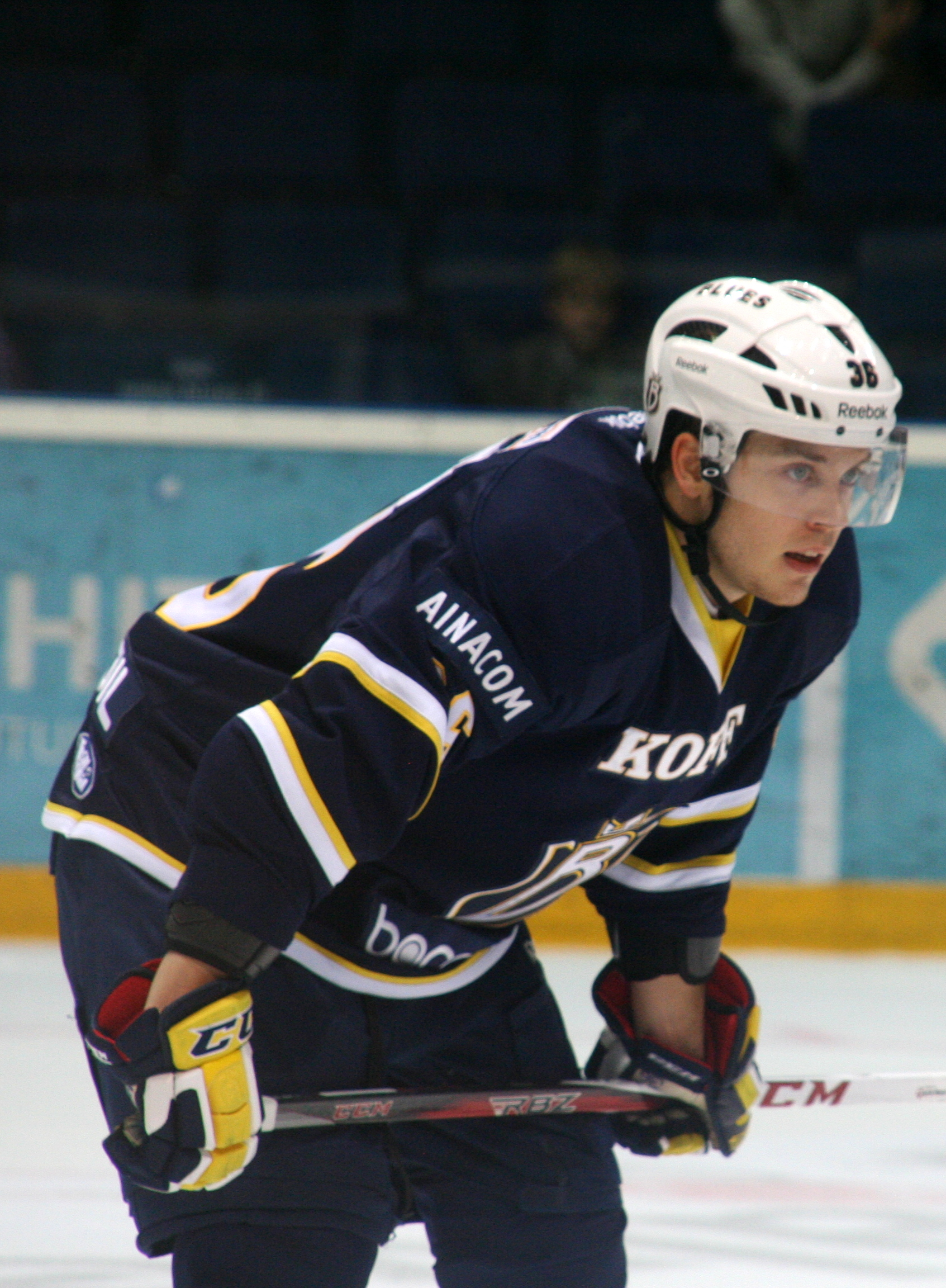
- Born: March 7, 1987 (age 38); Hollola, Finland
- Height: 6 ft 0 in (183 cm)
- Weight: 178 lb (81 kg; 12 st 10 lb)
- Position: Forward
- Shot: Left
- Played for: Pelicans; Blues; HPK; KooKoo
- NHL draft: Undrafted
- Playing career: 2008–2017

Teemu Rinkinen (born March 7, 1987) is a Finnish former professional ice hockey forward. He played in Liiga for Pelicans, Blues, HPK and KooKoo before ending his career in DEL2 in Germany with Dresdner Eislöwen.
