= Joonas Alanne =

Finnish ice hockey player

- Born: December 5, 1990 (age 34); Rovaniemi, Finland
- Height: 6 ft 0 in (183 cm)
- Weight: 176 lb (80 kg; 12 st 8 lb)
- Position: Forward
- Shoots: Left
- Asia League Ice Hockey team Former teams: Nikko Ice Bucks; Lahti Pelicans
- NHL draft: Undrafted
- Playing career: 2011–present

Joonas Alanne (born December 5, 1990) is a Finnish ice hockey player. He is currently playing with the Asia League Ice Hockey team the Nikko Ice Bucks. Alanne formerly played for the Lahti Pelicans in the Finnish Liiga.

Alanne made his Liiga debut playing with Lahti Pelicans during the 2013–14 Liiga season.
