= Juho Tommila =

Finnish ice hockey player

- Born: 9 February 1993 (age 32); Lappi, Finland
- Height: 6 ft 0 in (183 cm)
- Weight: 181 lb (82 kg; 12 st 13 lb)
- Position: Defence
- Shoots: Right
- Liiga team: Lukko
- Playing career: 2013–present

Juho Tommila (born 9 February 1993) is a Finnish ice hockey defenceman currently playing for Lukko of the Finnish Liiga.

Tommila made his SM-liiga debut playing with Lukko during the 2012–13 SM-liiga season.
