= Jerry Ahtola =

Finnish professional ice hockey forward

- Born: March 25, 1986 (age 40) Turku, Finland
- Height: 6 ft 3 in (191 cm)
- Weight: 201 lb (91 kg; 14 st 5 lb)
- Position: Forward
- Shoots: Left
- Liiga team Former teams: Ilves; HIFK; Tappara; Lukko; TPS
- Playing career: 2005–present

Jerry Ahtola (born March 25, 1986) is a Finnish professional ice hockey forward who currently plays for Ilves of the Liiga

Ahtola has previously played for HIFK, Tappara, Lukko and TPS.
