= Tommi Paakkolanvaara =

Finnish ice hockey player

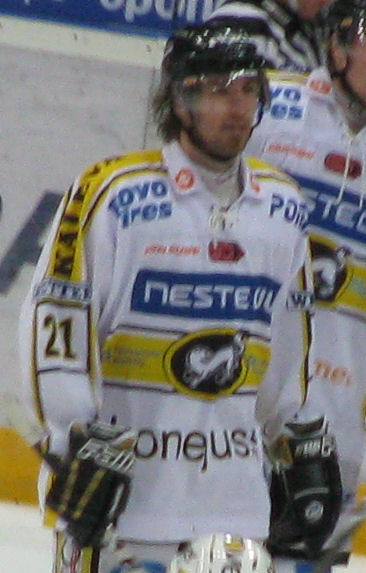
- Born: 1 March 1983 (age 42); Oulunsalo, Finland
- Height: 6 ft 2 in (188 cm)
- Weight: 185 lb (84 kg; 13 st 3 lb)
- Position: Forward
- Shot: Left
- Played for: Oulun Kärpät; Pelicans; Leksands IF; Ässät
- NHL draft: Undrafted
- Playing career: 2003–2018

Tommi Paakkolanvaara (born 1 March 1983) is a Finnish former professional ice hockey forward who played in the SM-liiga and Swedish Hockey League.
