= Juha-Pekka Pietilä =

Finnish ice hockey player

- Born: April 30, 1991 (age 33); Hollola, Finland
- Height: 6 ft 3 in (191 cm)
- Weight: 187 lb (85 kg; 13 st 5 lb)
- Position: Defence
- Shoots: Right
- SM-liiga team: Lahti Pelicans
- Playing career: 2010–present

Juha-Pekka Pietilä (born April 30, 1991) is a Finnish professional ice hockey player who played with Pelicans in the SM-liiga during the 2010–11 season.
