= 2016–17 Liiga season =

2016–17 SM-liiga
- League: SM-liiga
- Sport: Ice hockey
- Duration: September 2016 – April 2017
- Teams: 15
- TV partner: Nelonen

Regular season
- Best record: Tappara
- Runners-up: TPS
- Season MVP: Mika Pyörälä
- Top scorer: Henrik Haapala

Playoffs
- Playoffs MVP: Jukka Peltola
- Finals champions: Tappara
- Runners-up: KalPa

SM-liiga seasons
- ← 2015–16 2017–18 →

The 2016–17 SM-liiga season was the 42nd season of the SM-liiga, the top level of ice hockey in Finland, since the league's formation in 1975.

== Teams ==
Location of teams in 2016–2017 SM-liiga

Team	City	Head coach	Arena	Capacity	Captain
HIFK	Helsinki	Antti Törmänen	Helsingin jäähalli	8,200	Arttu Luttinen
HPK	Hämeenlinna	Antti Pennanen	Patria-areena	5,360	Niko Kapanen
Ilves	Tampere	Karri Kivi	Tampereen jäähalli	7,300	Tapio Laakso
Jukurit	Mikkeli	Risto Dufva	Kalevankankaan jäähalli	4,200	Marko Kauppinen
JYP	Jyväskylä	Marko Virtanen	Synergia-areena	4,437	Juha-Pekka Hytönen
KalPa	Kuopio	Pekka Virta	Niiralan monttu	5,064	Jussi Timonen
KooKoo	Kouvola	Petri Mattila	Lumon arena	6,200	Josh Green
Kärpät	Oulu	Kai Suikkanen	Oulun Energia Areena	6,768	Lasse Kukkonen
Lukko	Rauma	~~Juha Vuori~~; 21 Nov 2016; Kari Heikkilä	Äijänsuo Arena	5,400	Janne Niskala
Pelicans	Lahti	Petri Matikainen	Isku Areena	5,530	Antti Erkinjuntti
SaiPa	Lappeenranta	Ari Santanen	Kisapuisto	4,820	Ville Koho
Sport	Vaasa	Tomek Valtonen	Vaasa Arena	4,512	Markus Kankaanperä
Tappara	Tampere	Jussi Tapola	Tampereen jäähalli	7,300	Jukka Peltola
TPS	Turku	Ari-Pekka Selin	HK Arena	11,820	Tomi Kallio
Ässät	Pori	Jyrki Aho	Porin jäähalli	6,300	Matti Kuparinen

== Regular season ==
The top six teams advance directly to the quarter-finals, while teams placing 7th through 10th play in the wild-card round for the final two spots. The SM-liiga is a closed league and there is no relegation.

Pos	Team	Pld	W	OTW	OTL	L	GF	GA	GD	Pts	Final Result
1	Tappara	60	34	10	5	11	185	129	+56	127	Advance to Quarterfinals
2	TPS	60	30	8	8	14	167	123	+44	114	Advance to Quarterfinals
3	KalPa	60	28	9	10	13	168	140	+28	112	Advance to Quarterfinals
4	JYP	60	28	9	9	14	160	123	+37	111	Advance to Quarterfinals
5	HPK	60	23	12	5	20	153	136	+17	98	Advance to Quarterfinals
6	Pelicans	60	23	8	8	21	157	150	+7	93	Advance to Quarterfinals
7	Ässät	60	24	7	4	25	128	142	−14	90	Advance to Wild-card round
8	Kärpät	60	22	9	6	23	147	136	+11	90	Advance to Wild-card round
9	HIFK	60	22	8	5	25	138	140	−2	87	Advance to Wild-card round
10	Ilves	60	21	6	7	26	143	146	−3	82	Advance to Wild-card round
11	Jukurit	60	20	4	8	28	128	141	−13	76	
12	Lukko	60	17	6	8	29	151	177	−26	71	
13	KooKoo	60	15	7	11	27	137	173	−36	70	
14	Sport	60	16	5	11	28	128	169	−41	69	
15	SaiPa	60	14	5	8	33	116	181	−65	60	

Source: Liiga

Rules for classification: 1) Points; 2) 3-point wins 3) Goal difference; 4) Goals scored; 4) Head-to-head points.

== Playoffs ==
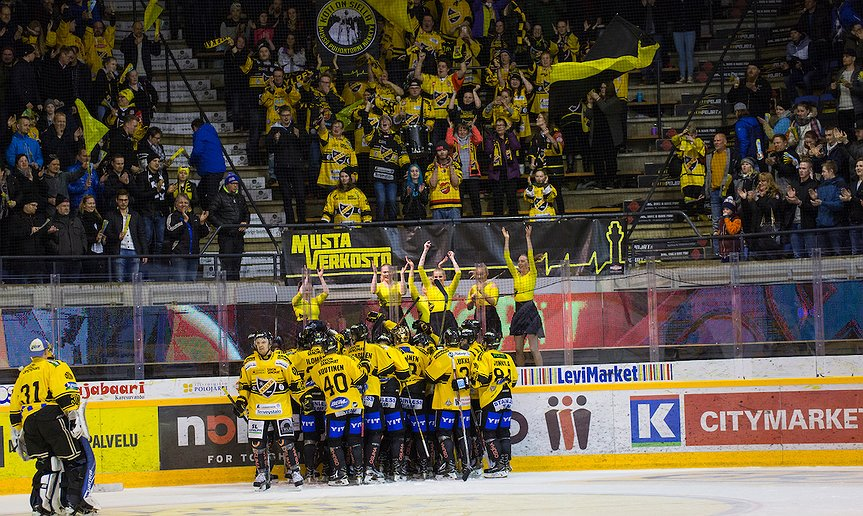
KalPa wins the 2nd semi-final match in Kuopio

=== Bracket ===
Wild-card round (best-of-3)
7	Ässät	1
10	Ilves	2
8	Kärpät	0
9	HIFK	2

Quarter-finals (best-of-7)
1	Tappara	4
10	Ilves	3
2	TPS	2
9	HIFK	4
3	KalPa	4
6	Pelicans	1
4	JYP	4
5	HPK	3

Semi-finals (best-of-7)
1	Tappara	4
9	HIFK	1
(Pairings are re-seeded after the first and second round)
3	KalPa	4
4	JYP	3

Finals (best-of-7)
1	Tappara	4
3	KalPa	2
Bronze medal game
4	JYP	1
9	HIFK	0

=== Wild card round (best-of-three) ===
==== (7) Ässät vs. (10) Ilves ====
15 March 2017; 18:30	Ässät	3–2 1OT (1–0, 0–1, 1–1, 1–0)	Ilves	Isomäki Areena, Pori; Attendance: 3,645

Game reference

Andreas Bernard
Goalies
Antti Lehtonen
Referees:
Aaro Brännare
Teemu Salminen
Linesmen:
Jani Pesonen
Teemu Riikonen

N. Ojamäki (C. Bertrand) – 15:50	1–0
	1–1	25:06 – V. Meskanen (M. Sointu, M. Flinck)
V. Korhonen (M. Kuparinen, M. Matushkin) (PP1) – 44:59	2–1
	2–2	49:40 – M. Sointu (M. Fagerudd, A. Laatikainen)
M. Kuparinen (J. Seppälä) – 68:25	3–2

4 min
Penalties
4 min
44
Shots
25

16 March 2017; 18:30	Ilves	6–1 (3–0, 0–0, 3–1)	Ässät	Tampere Ice Stadium, Tampere; Attendance: 6,319

Game reference

Antti Lehtonen
Goalies
Andreas Bernard
Referees:
Jukka Hakkarainen
Mikko Kaukokari
Linesmen:
Markus Hägerström
Sakari Suominen

E. Suomi (J. Liuksiala, S. Vuoti) – 04:31	1–0
M. Fagerudd (M. Keränen, T. Rautiainen) – 13:39	2–0
M. Flinck (V. Meskanen, J. Parikka) – 17:29	3–0
V. Meskanen (O. Koivula, T. Aalto) (PP2) – 44:52	4–0
V. Meskanen (PP1) – 45:24	5–0
M. Keränen (J. Liuksiala, O. Vainio) (PP1) – 46:46	6–0
	6–1	52:28 – M. Kuparinen (M. Varttinen, J. Tommila)

8 min
Penalties
8 min
34
Shots
27

18 March 2017; 17:00	Ässät	0–1 1OT (0–0, 0–0, 0–0, 0–1)	Ilves	Isomäki Areena, Pori; Attendance: 5,457

Game reference
Andreas Bernard	Goalies	Antti Lehtonen	Referees: Aaro Brännare; Teemu Salminen; Linesmen: Jani Pesonen; Teemu Riikonen
0–1 / 64:17 – A. Mustonen (M. Keränen, A. Laatikainen)			Referees: Aaro Brännare; Teemu Salminen; Linesmen: Jani Pesonen; Teemu Riikonen
8 min	Penalties	4 min	Referees: Aaro Brännare; Teemu Salminen; Linesmen: Jani Pesonen; Teemu Riikonen
36	Shots	38	Referees: Aaro Brännare; Teemu Salminen; Linesmen: Jani Pesonen; Teemu Riikonen

Ilves wins the series 2-1.

==== (8) Kärpät vs. (9) HIFK ====
15 March 2017; 18:30	Kärpät	3–4 1OT (2–2, 1–0, 0–1, 0–1)	HIFK	Oulun Energia Areena, Oulu; Attendance: 5,024

Game reference

Jussi Rynnäs
Goalies
Kevin Lankinen
Referees:
Antti Boman
Stefan Fonselius
Linesmen:
Henri Neva
Hannu Sormunen

	0–1	00:42 – J. Rask (T. Eronen, R. Hintz)
S. Anttila (M. Humaloja, J. Rynnäs) – 05:45	1–1
M. Humaloja (S. Anttila, J. Sailio) – 11:28	2–1
	2–2	18:48 – R. Leino (O. Kaski, M. Johansson)
B. Trotter (J. Albert, M. Pyörälä) (PP1) – 30:19	3–2
	3–3	44:42 – J. Malinen (L. Petrell, J. Aaltonen)
	3–4	63:49 – T. Eronen (J. Puustinen, J. Rask)

6 min
Penalties
4 min
25
Shots
23

16 March 2017; 18:30	HIFK	4–3 1OT (0–1, 2–0, 1–2, 1–0)	Kärpät	Helsinki Ice Hall, Helsinki; Attendance: 6,658

Game reference

Kevin Lankinen
Goalies
Jussi Rynnäs
Referees:
Jari Levonen
Anssi Salonen
Linesmen:
Pasi Nieminen
Tommi Niittylä

	0–1	08:48 – M. Humaloja (I. Švarný, J. Sailio)
D. Grillfors (M. Generous, C. Elkins) – 23:30	1–1
T. Tuomisto (C. Elkins, J. Ikonen) – 38:02	2–1
	2–2	40:41 – J. Albert (J. Hakanpää, I. Švarný)
J. Puustinen (T. Eronen, R. Hintz) – 42:07	3–2
	3–3	57:21 – M. Humaloja (J. Sailio, S. Anttila)
J. Ikonen (T. Tuomisto, C. Elkins) – 63:25	4–3

6 min
Penalties
10 min
30
Shots
22

HIFK wins the series 2-0.

=== Quarterfinals (best-of-seven) ===
==== (1) Tappara vs. (10) Ilves ====
21 March 2017; 18:30	Tappara	3–6 (1–0, 2–5, 0–1)	Ilves	Tampere Ice Stadium, Tampere; Attendance: 7,300

Game reference

~~Teemu Lassila~~
Dominik Hrachovina
Goalies
Antti Lehtonen
Referees:
Jari Levonen
Petri Lindqvist
Linesmen:
Samuli Niskanen
Sakari Suominen

V. Kemiläinen (H. Haapala, T. Nurmi) (PP1) – 02:13	1–0
O. Rantakari (H. Haapala, S. Repo) – 21:37	2–0
	2–1	31:00 – E. Suomi (J. Liuksiala, O. Vainio)
M. Røymark (J. Jasu, O. Rantakari) – 31:55	3–1
	3–2	33:25 – M. Sointu (T. Laakso, V. Meskanen) (DP)
	3–3	35:42 – O. Koivula (T. Aalto, T. Laakso) (PP1)
	3–4	35:59 – M. Sointu (M. Flinck, A. Mustonen)
	3–5	38:21 – T. Rautiainen (V-M Vittasmäki, T. Aalto) (PP1)
	3–6	58:33 – A. Mustonen (T. Laakso) (EN)

10 min
Penalties
2 min
21
Shots
28

23 March 2017; 18:30	Ilves	1–2 1OT (0–0, 0–0, 1–1, 0–1)	Tappara	Tampere Ice Stadium, Tampere; Attendance: 7,300

Game reference

Antti Lehtonen
Goalies
Dominik Hrachovina
Referees:
Antti Boman
Stefan Fonselius
Linesmen:
Joonas Elonen
Markus Hägerström

T. Laakso (T. Rautiainen, O. Koivula) – 43:51	1–0
	1–1	47:45 – J. Peltola (J-M Järvinen, A. Salonen)
	1–2	62:56 – S. Repo (A. Salonen, O. Rauhala)

4 min
Penalties
4 min
24
Shots
24

25 March 2017; 17:00	Tappara	0–1 1OT (0–0, 0–0, 0–0, 0–1)	Ilves	Tampere Ice Stadium, Tampere; Attendance: 7,300

Game reference
Dominik Hrachovina	Goalies	Antti Lehtonen	Referees: Mikko Kaukokari; Joonas Kova; Linesmen: Lauri Nikulainen; Daniel Österholm
0–1 / 72:51 – O. Koivula (T. Laakso)			Referees: Mikko Kaukokari; Joonas Kova; Linesmen: Lauri Nikulainen; Daniel Österholm
2 min	Penalties	4 min	Referees: Mikko Kaukokari; Joonas Kova; Linesmen: Lauri Nikulainen; Daniel Österholm
42	Shots	30	Referees: Mikko Kaukokari; Joonas Kova; Linesmen: Lauri Nikulainen; Daniel Österholm

27 March 2017; 18:30	Ilves	0–4 (0–1, 0–2, 0–1)	Tappara	Tampere Ice Stadium, Tampere; Attendance: 7,300

Game reference

Antti Lehtonen
Goalies
Dominik Hrachovina
Referees:
Aaro Brännare
Teemu Salminen
Linesmen:
Henri Neva
Hannu Sormunen

0–1	13:57 – B. Parlett (J. Lajunen, A. Salonen)
0–2	20:31 – K. Kuusela (J. Lajunen)
0–3	25:03 – V-M Savinainen (A. Elorinne, P. Saravo)
0–4	41:52 – T. Nurmi (V-M Savinainen, J. Lajunen) (PP1)

2 min
Penalties
8 min
21
Shots
21

29 March 2017; 18:3029	Tappara	2–4 (1–2, 0–0, 1–2)	Ilves	Tampere Ice Stadium, Tampere; Attendance: 7,300

Game reference

Dominik Hrachovina
Goalies
Antti Lehtonen
Referees:
Mikko Kaukokari
Joonas Kova
Linesmen:
Lauri Nikulainen
Daniel Österholm

	0–1	01:35 – M. Fagerudd (J. Liuksiala, S. Vuoti)
	0–2	04:54 – V. Meskanen
V-M Savinainen (O. Rantakari, J-M Järvinen) – 06:32	1–2
S. Repo (T. Nurmi, O. Rantakari) (PP1) – 52:40	2–2
	2–3	54:23 – T. Laakso (O. Koivula, T. Rautiainen)
	2–4	58:42 – A. Mustonen (J. D'Amigo, T. Laakso)

2 min
Penalties
8 min
28
Shots
27

31 March 2017; 18:30	Ilves	1–2 3OT (0–1, 0–0, 1–0, 0–0, 0–0, 0–1)	Tappara	Tampere Ice Stadium, Tampere; Attendance: 7,300

Game reference

Antti Lehtonen
Goalies
Dominik Hrachovina
Referees:
Aaro Brännare
Teemu Salminen
Linesmen:
Henri Neva
Hannu Sormunen

	0–1	03:05 – J. Karjalainen (V. Kemiläinen, O. Rauhala)
M. Flinck (O. Vainio, V. Meskanen) – 45:53	1–1
	1–2	107:39 – B. Parlett (J. Peltola, J-M Järvinen)

4 min
Penalties
10 min
64
Shots
45

1 April 2017; 17:00	Tappara	2–0 (2–0, 0–0, 0–0)	Ilves	Tampere Ice Stadium, Tampere; Attendance: 7,300

Game reference
Dominik Hrachovina	Goalies	Antti Lehtonen	Referees: Jari Levonen; Petri Lindqvist; Linesmen: Lauri Nikulainen; Daniel Österholm
J. Lajunen (V. Kemiläinen, V-M Savinainen) – 00:22 / 1–0; H. Haapala (J. Peltola) – 06:12 / 2–0			Referees: Jari Levonen; Petri Lindqvist; Linesmen: Lauri Nikulainen; Daniel Österholm
2 min	Penalties	4 min	Referees: Jari Levonen; Petri Lindqvist; Linesmen: Lauri Nikulainen; Daniel Österholm
15	Shots	21	Referees: Jari Levonen; Petri Lindqvist; Linesmen: Lauri Nikulainen; Daniel Österholm

Tappara wins the series 4-3.

==== (2) TPS vs. (9) HIFK ====
21 March 2017; 18:30	TPS	4–1 (0–0, 2–1, 2–0)	HIFK	Gatorade Center, Turku; Attendance: 6,611

Game reference

Oskari Setänen
Goalies
Kevin Lankinen
Referees:
Timo Favorin
Kristian Vikman
Linesmen:
Pasi Nieminen
Tommi Niittylä

T. Kallio – 22:57	1–0
	1–1	29:44 – R. Hintz (J. Rask)
P. Virta (É. Perrin, H. Tallinder) (PP1) – 36:59	2–1
T. Väyrynen (J. Virtanen, E. Eronen) (SH) – 44:20	3–1
E. Thorell (J. Ahtola, P. Virta) (EN) – 59:12	4–1

14 min
Penalties
18 min
30
Shots
16

23 March 2017; 18:30	HIFK	3–1 (2–0, 0–1, 1–0)	TPS	Helsinki Ice Hall, Helsinki; Attendance: 7,387

Game reference

Kevin Lankinen
Goalies
Oskari Setänen
Referees:
Aaro Brännare
Teemu Salminen
Linesmen:
Jani Pesonen
Teemu Riikonen

S. Salmela (R. O'Connor, C. Elkins) – 11:48	1–0
O. Kaski (M. Johansson, J. Aaltonen) – 18:50	2–0
	2–1	32:59 – I. Heikkinen (J. Virtanen, J. Lindsten)
M-M Åsten (R. Leino, K. Kantola) – 54:00	3–1

4 min
Penalties
8 min
23
Shots
29

25 March 2017; 17:00	TPS	4–1 (2–0, 1–0, 1–1)	HIFK	Gatorade Center, Turku; Attendance: 11,011

Game reference

Oskari Setänen
Goalies
Kevin Lankinen
Referees:
Jari Levonen
Petri Lindqvist
Linesmen:
Markus Hägerström
Samuli Niskanen

P. Virta (E. Thorell, T. Lahtinen) – 00:56	1–0
J. Lindsten (SH) – 16:29	2–0
O. Nieminen (T. Taavitsainen) – 30:34	3–0
	3–1	49:12 – R. O'Connor (R. Leino)
P. Virta (J. Ahtola, E. Thorell) (EN) – 58:51	4–1

12 min
Penalties
48 min
24
Shots
21

27 March 2017; 18:30	HIFK	3–2 2OT (2–0, 0–1, 0–1, 0–0, 1–0)	TPS	Helsinki Ice Hall, Helsinki; Attendance: 8,067

Game reference

Kevin Lankinen
Goalies
Oskari Setänen
Referees:
Jari-Pekka Pajula
Anssi Salonen
Linesmen:
Pasi Nieminen
Tommi Niittylä

C. Elkins (M. Partanen) – 02:36	1–0
J. Rask – 12:45	2–0
	2–1	26:05 – P. Virta (M. Berger, H. Tikkanen)
	2–2	53:18 – J. Ahtola (E. Eronen, H. Tallinder)
C. Elkins (T. Eronen, J. Aaltonen) – 92:12	3–2

12 min
Penalties
12 min
46
Shots
41

29 March 2017; 18:3029	TPS	2–5 (2–0, 0–2, 0–3)	HIFK	Gatorade Center, Turku; Attendance: 8,149

Game reference

~~Oskari Setänen~~
Alexandar Georgiev
Goalies
Kevin Lankinen
Referees:
Jari Levonen
Petri Lindqvist
Linesmen:
Markus Hägerström
Samuli Niskanen

I. Heikkinen (P. Savilahti, O. Setänen) – 07:34	1–0
O. Nieminen (T. Taavitsainen, J. Virtanen) (PP1) – 10:19	2–0
	2–1	25:35 – M. Partanen (M. Heiskanen, C. Elkins)
	2–2	26:46 – J. Jääskä (J. Aaltonen, L. Petrell)
	2–3	42:25 – J. Rask (J. Puustinen, R. Hintz)
	2–4	44:39 – J. Puustinen (J. Rask, R. Hintz)
	2–5	59:19 – R. Hintz (EN)

4 min
Penalties
2 min
27
Shots
36

31 March 2017; 18:30	HIFK	3–2 1OT (1–0, 0–1, 1–1, 1–0)	TPS	Helsinki Ice Hall, Helsinki; Attendance: 8,200

Game reference

Kevin Lankinen
Goalies
Oskari Setänen
Referees:
Timo Favorin
Kristian Vikman
Linesmen:
Jani Pesonen
Teemu Riikonen

T. Eronen (J. Malinen) (PP1) – 08:59	1–0
	1–1	38:34 – P. Virta (T. Kallio)
K. Kantola (M-M Åsten, R. Hintz) – 43:33	2–1
	2–2	43:57 – H. Tallinder (T. Taavitsainen, T. Lahtinen)
M. Partanen (L. Petrell, J. Finley) – 61:29	3–2

4 min
Penalties
4 min
23
Shots
37

HIFK wins the series 4-2.

==== (3) KalPa vs. (6) Pelicans ====
22 March 2017; 18:30	KalPa	2–1 2OT (0–0, 0–1, 1–0, 0–0, 1–0)	Pelicans	Niiralan monttu, Kuopio; Attendance: 3,817

Game reference

Denis Godla
Goalies
Karri Rämö
Referees:
Jussi Leppänen
Jouni Saukkonen
Linesmen:
Henri Neva
Hannu Sormunen

	0–1	23:18 – K. Koivisto (V. Sopanen, M. Siikonen)
T. Jokinen (A. Ilomäki, M. Myttynen) (PP1) – 43:38	1–1
J. Keränen (M. Myttynen, J. Riikola) – 92:22	2–1

4 min
Penalties
4 min
46
Shots
37

24 March 2017; 18:30	Pelicans	2–3 1OT (1–1, 0–1, 1–0, 0–1)	KalPa	Isku Areena, Lahti; Attendance: 4,743

Game reference

Karri Rämö
Goalies
Denis Godla
Referees:
Jari-Pekka Pajula
Anssi Salonen
Linesmen:
Joona Elonen
Sakari Suominen

K. Koivisto (I. Kangasniemi, M. Siikonen) (PP1) – 03:46	1–0
	1–1	13:54 – J. Keränen (PS)
	1–2	26:45 – J. Mankinen (J. Timonen, J. Keränen)
K. Koivisto (I. Kangasniemi, V. Sopanen) – 55:03	2–2
	2–3	62:16 – J. Keränen (J. Rissanen) (PP1)

14 min
Penalties
26 min
23
Shots
32

25 March 2017; 17:00	KalPa	1–2 (0–0, 1–1, 0–1)	Pelicans	Niiralan monttu, Kuopio; Attendance: 4,767

Game reference

Denis Godla
Goalies
Janne Juvonen
Referees:
Timo Favorin
Kristian Vikman
Linesmen:
Henri Neva
Hannu Sormunen

A. Ruuttu (S. Lukka, M. Nuutinen) – 31:55	1–0
	1–1	36:32 – J. Alanne (J. Hodgman, J. Leimu)
	1–2	55:19 – J. Alanne (A. Erkinjuntti, N. Manelius)

6 min
Penalties
4 min
27
Shots
22

27 March 2017; 18:30	Pelicans	2–5 (0–1, 1–3, 1–1)	KalPa	Isku Areena, Lahti; Attendance: 4,057

Game reference

~~Janne Juvonen~~
Karri Rämö
Goalies
Eero Kilpeläinen
Referees:
Antti Boman
Stefan Fonselius
Linesmen:
Joona Elonen
Sakari Suominen

	0–1	15:08 – M. Pitkänen (J. Riikola, B. Sebők)
V. Sopanen (A. Erkinjuntti, J. Leimu) (PP2) – 20:50	1–1
	1–2	28:44 – J. Lyytinen (J. Mankinen, A. Ruuttu) (PP1)
	1–3	30:01 – M. Seppälä (A. Ruuttu, B. Sebők)
	1–4	33:24 – J. Lyytinen (J. Mankinen, J. Rissanen) (PP1)
J. Hodgman (M. Kousa, A. Erkinjuntti) (PP1) – 40:33	2–4
	2–5	58:06 – M. Nuutinen (J. Keränen) (EN)

6 min
Penalties
31 min
19
Shots
28

29 March 2017; 18:3029	KalPa	6–0 (3–0, 3–0, 0–0)	Pelicans	Niiralan monttu, Kuopio; Attendance: 4,171

Game reference

Eero Kilpeläinen
Goalies
Karri Rämö
Referees:
Timo Favorin
Kristian Vikman
Linesmen:
Timo Heinonen
Pasi Nieminen

J. Mankinen (J. Lyytinen) (PP1) – 03:48	1–0
J. Rissanen (J. Riikola, S. Lukka) – 13:41	2–0
J. Junnila (B. Sebők) – 17:56	3–0
J. Rissanen (S. Lukka, J. Mankinen) – 22:32	4–0
M. Myttynen (B. Sebők, A. Ilomäki) (PP1) – 32:32	5–0
T. Jokinen (M. Myttynen, A. Ilomäki) (PP1) – 37:09	6–0

4 min
Penalties
42 min
28
Shots
26

KalPa wins the series 4-1.

==== (4) JYP vs. (5) HPK ====
22 March 2017; 18:30	JYP	3–2 1OT (0–1, 1–1, 1–0, 1–0)	HPK	Synergia-areena, Jyväskylä; Attendance: 3,282

Game reference

Juho Olkinuora
Goalies
Emil Larmi
Referees:
Mikko Kaukokari
Joonas Kova
Linesmen:
Lauri Nikulainen
Daniel Österholm

	0–1	06:55 – E. Somervuori (J. Lehtivuori, J. Lahti)
	0–2	25:56 – J. Lehtivuori (N. Kapanen, J. Lahti)
M. Miklík (J. Tavi, N. Friman) – 26:54	1–2
J-P Hytönen (J. Tavi, M. Miklík) – 48:58	2–2
A. Suomela (J. Tavi, M. Kalteva) (PP1) – 63:18	3–2

4 min
Penalties
20 min
38
Shots
24

24 March 2017; 18:30	HPK	2–1 (1–1, 1–0, 0–0)	JYP	Ritarihalli, Hämeenlinna; Attendance: 4,415

Game reference

Emil Larmi
Goalies
Juho Olkinuora
Referees:
Jukka Hakkarainen
Lassi Heikkinen
Linesmen:
Timo Heinonen
Pasi Nieminen

	0–1	05:46 – M. Miklík (A. Löfman, J. Tavi) (PP1)
J. Lahti (N. Kapanen, J. Lehtivuori) – 06:19	1–1
O. Manninen (P. Nikkilä, N. Kapanen) (DP) – 29:37	2–1

8 min
Penalties
6 min
22
Shots
32

25 March 2017; 17:00	JYP	2–3 2OT (2–1, 0–0, 0–1, 0–0, 0–1)	HPK	Synergia-areena, Jyväskylä; Attendance: 4,185

Game reference

Pekka Tuokkola
Goalies
Emil Larmi
Referees:
Jussi Leppänen
Jouni Saukkonen
Linesmen:
Timo Heinonen
Tommi Niittylä

	0–1	15:16 – J. Lehtivuori (S. Manninen, O. Palve) (PP1)
J. Turkulainen (J-P Hytönen, M. Kuukka) – 15:34	1–1
J. Tuppurainen (J. Tavi, A. Löfman) (PP1) – 16:40	2–1
	2–2	58:02 – S. Manninen (J. Lehtivuori, T. Turunen)
	2–3	80:25 – P. Nikkilä (J. Lehtivuori, O. Palve)

8 min
Penalties
8 min
43
Shots
37

27 March 2017; 18:30	HPK	1–3 (0–0, 0–1, 1–2)	JYP	Ritarihalli, Hämeenlinna; Attendance: 4,071

Game reference

Emil Larmi
Goalies
Juho Olkinuora
Referees:
Jukka Hakkarainen
Lassi Heikkinen
Linesmen:
Jani Pesonen
Teemu Riikonen

	0–1	29:26 – A. Löfman (S. Niku, T. Pihlman)
J. Koivisto (N. Kapanen, J. Lahti) – 45:45	1–1
	1–2	46:09 – M. Miklík (J. Tuppurainen, U. Vaakanainen)
	1–3	59:22 – N. Friman (J. Nättinen) (EN)

4 min
Penalties
10 min
28
Shots
24

29 March 2017; 18:3029	JYP	3–2 1OT (0–0, 1–0, 1–2, 1–0)	HPK	Synergia-areena, Jyväskylä; Attendance: 3,392

Game reference

Juho Olkinuora
Goalies
Emil Larmi
Referees:
Antti Boman
Stefan Fonselius
Linesmen:
Jani Pesonen
Teemu Riikonen

A. Suomela (S. Niku, N. Yonkman) – 30:53	1–0
	1–1	48:38 – E. Somervuori (J. Lehtivuori, S. Manninen) (PP1)
	1–2	57:43 – H. Forsberg (E. Somervuori, T. Turunen)
A. Suomela (J-P Hytönen, J. Tuppurainen) – 58:53	2–2
M. Kuukka (U. Vaakanainen, J. Tavi) – 74:05	3–2

12 min
Penalties
6 min
42
Shots
40

31 March 2017; 18:30	HPK	5–2 (1–0, 3–1, 1–1)	JYP	Ritarihalli, Hämeenlinna; Attendance: 3,781

Game reference

Emil Larmi
Goalies
Juho Olkinuora
Referees:
Jari-Pekka Pajula
Anssi Salonen
Linesmen:
Markus Hägerström
Sakari Suominen

S. Manninen – 02:35	1–0
J. Koivisto (S. Sillanpää, M. Ruokonen) – 23:17	2–0
T. Turunen (J. Tuulola, J. Keränen) – 25:00	3–0
E. Somervuori (T. Turunen, S. Manninen) (PP1) – 37:57	4–0
	4–1	39:34 – J-P Hytönen (J. Uotila, J. Tavi)
	4–2	55:06 – Joonas Nättinen (S. Niku, A. Suomela)
P. Nikkilä (O. Paajanen) (EN) – 59:53	5–2

14 min
Penalties
12 min
22
Shots
36

1 April 2017; 17:00	JYP	3–2 (2–0, 1–0, 0–2)	HPK	Synergia-areena, Jyväskylä; Attendance: 4,437

Game reference

Juho Olkinuora
Goalies
Emil Larmi
Referees:
Jari-Pekka Pajula
Anssi Salonen
Linesmen:
Pasi Nieminen
Tommi Niittylä

M. Miklík (N. Yonkman, A. Löfman) – 08:39	1–0
M. Miklík (J. Tuppurainen, A. Löfman) – 10:52	2–0
J. Nättinen (M. Miklík, T. Pihlman) (PP1) – 34:49	3–0
	3–1	43:19 – E. Somervuori (S. O'Brien, O. Paajanen)
	3–2	50:41 – J. Keränen (N. Kapanen, O. Manninen)

6 min
Penalties
18 min
35
Shots
33

JYP wins the series 4-3.

=== Semifinals (best-of-seven) ===
==== (1) Tappara vs. (9) HIFK ====
4 April 2017; 18:30	Tappara	2–0 (0–0, 1–0, 1–0)	HIFK	Tampere Ice Stadium, Tampere; Attendance: 4,897

Game reference
Dominik Hrachovina	Goalies	Kevin Lankinen	Referees: Petri Lindqvist; Teemu Salminen; Linesmen: Jani Pesonen; Teemu Riikonen
S. Repo (O. Rantakari, P. Saravo) – 28:55 / 1–0; V-M Savinainen (K. Kuusela, A. Elorinne) (EN) – 59:31 / 2–0			Referees: Petri Lindqvist; Teemu Salminen; Linesmen: Jani Pesonen; Teemu Riikonen
12 min	Penalties	10 min	Referees: Petri Lindqvist; Teemu Salminen; Linesmen: Jani Pesonen; Teemu Riikonen
29	Shots	12	Referees: Petri Lindqvist; Teemu Salminen; Linesmen: Jani Pesonen; Teemu Riikonen

6 April 2017; 18:30	HIFK	2–5 (0–1, 0–3, 2–1)	Tappara	Helsinki Ice Hall, Helsinki; Attendance: 7,559

Game reference

Kevin Lankinen
Goalies
Dominik Hrachovina
Referees:
Antti Boman
Stefan Fonselius
Linesmen:
Markus Hägerström
Sakari Suominen

	0–1	04:16 – J. Luoto (A. Elorinne)
	0–2	21:12 – J. Lajunen (B. Parlett, A. Bonsaksen)
	0–3	26:08 – H. Haapala (V. Kemiläinen, D. Hrachovina) (PP1)
	0–4	27:44 – T. Nurmi (H. Haapala, V. Kemiläinen) (PP1)
	0–5	40:19 – V. Savinainen (K. Kuusela, V. Kemiläinen)
J. Puustinen (R. Hintz, J. Rask) – 51:35	1–5
M. Åsten (R. Leino, D. Grillfors) – 54:36	2–5

41 min
Penalties
22 min
27
Shots
18

8 April 2017; 17:00	Tappara	2–3 (1–1, 1–1, 0–1)	HIFK	Tampere Ice Stadium, Tampere; Attendance: 7,300

Game reference

Dominik Hrachovina
Goalies
Niklas Bäckström
Referees:
Stefan Fonselius
Jari Levonen
Linesmen:
Henri Neva
Hannu Sormunen

V. Kemiläinen (J. Lajunen, V. Savinainen) (PP1) – 05:05	1–0
	1–1	15:51 – R. O'Connor (J. Aaltonen) (PP1)
S. Repo (O. Rauhala) – 32:53	2–1
	2–2	35:40 – J. Malinen (R. Hintz, J. Puustinen) (PP1)
	2–3	54:09 – J. Malinen (J. Puustinen, M. Heiskanen) (PP1)

10 min
Penalties
6 min
28
Shots
25

10 April 2017; 18:30	HIFK	0–2 (0–1, 0–0, 0–1)	Tappara	Helsinki Ice Hall, Helsinki; Attendance: 8,200

Game reference
Kevin Lankinen	Goalies	Dominik Hrachovina	Referees: Petri Lindqvist; Teemu Salminen; Linesmen: Jani Pesonen; Teemu Riikonen
0–1 / 04:08 – K. Kuusela (J. Lajunen, V. Kemiläinen); 0–2 / 59:42 – J. Karjalainen (K. Kuusela, A. Elorinne) (EN)			Referees: Petri Lindqvist; Teemu Salminen; Linesmen: Jani Pesonen; Teemu Riikonen
10 min	Penalties	0 min	Referees: Petri Lindqvist; Teemu Salminen; Linesmen: Jani Pesonen; Teemu Riikonen
15	Shots	28	Referees: Petri Lindqvist; Teemu Salminen; Linesmen: Jani Pesonen; Teemu Riikonen

12 April 2017; 18:30	Tappara	4–3 (1–1, 0–1, 3–1)	HIFK	Tampere Ice Stadium, Tampere; Attendance: 5,866

Game reference

Dominik Hrachovina
Goalies
~~Niklas Bäckström~~
Kevin Lankinen
Referees:
Stefan Fonselius
Jari Levonen
Linesmen:
Henri Neva
Hannu Sormunen

K. Kuusela (B. Parlett, V. Savinainen) – 01:36	1–0
	1–1	14:51 – K. Kantola (J. Finley, L. Petrell)
	1–2	34:48 – L. Petrell (M. Heiskanen)
J. Peltola (H. Haapala, A. Bonsaksen) – 43:49	2–2
J. Peltola (B. Parlett, V. Savinainen) – 44:26	3–2
T. Nurmi (V. Kemiläinen, H. Haapala) (PP1) – 45:21	4–2
	4–3	58:29 – L. Petrell (T. Eronen, T. Tuomisto) (PP1)

10 min
Penalties
2 min
16
Shots
26

Tappara wins the series 4-1.

==== (3) KalPa vs. (4) JYP ====
5 April 2017; 18:30	KalPa	2–0 (1–0, 0–0, 1–0)	JYP	Niiralan monttu, Kuopio; Attendance: 4,438

Game reference
Eero Kilpeläinen	Goalies	Juho Olkinuora	Referees: Jari-Pekka Pajula; Anssi Salonen; Linesmen: Lauri Nikulainen; Daniel Österholm
O. Leskinen (M. Myttynen, J. Timonen) – 01:08 / 1–0; J. Riikola (S. Lukka, J. Keränen) – 49:10 / 2–0			Referees: Jari-Pekka Pajula; Anssi Salonen; Linesmen: Lauri Nikulainen; Daniel Österholm
6 min	Penalties	2 min	Referees: Jari-Pekka Pajula; Anssi Salonen; Linesmen: Lauri Nikulainen; Daniel Österholm
24	Shots	27	Referees: Jari-Pekka Pajula; Anssi Salonen; Linesmen: Lauri Nikulainen; Daniel Österholm

7 April 2017; 18:30	JYP	0–3 (0–0, 0–1, 0–2)	KalPa	Synergia-areena, Jyväskylä; Attendance: 4,437

Game reference

Pekka Tuokkola
Goalies
Eero Kilpeläinen
Referees:
Timo Favorin
Kristian Vikman
Linesmen:
Pasi Nieminen
Jani Pesonen

0–1	20:41 – T. Jokinen
0–2	48:31 – J. Mankinen (J. Keränen, J. Rissanen)
0–3	57:39 – J. Junnila (S. Mutanen) (EN)

18 min
Penalties
10 min
21
Shots
28

8 April 2017; 17:00	KalPa	0–1 (0–1, 0–0, 0–0)	JYP	Niiralan monttu, Kuopio; Attendance: 5,064

Game reference
Eero Kilpeläinen	Goalies	Juho Olkinuora	Referees: Mikko Kaukokari; Anssi Salonen; Linesmen: Lauri Nikulainen; Daniel Österholm
0–1 / 03:01 – A. Löfman (N. Friman, J. Tuppurainen)			Referees: Mikko Kaukokari; Anssi Salonen; Linesmen: Lauri Nikulainen; Daniel Österholm
6 min	Penalties	8 min	Referees: Mikko Kaukokari; Anssi Salonen; Linesmen: Lauri Nikulainen; Daniel Österholm
23	Shots	23	Referees: Mikko Kaukokari; Anssi Salonen; Linesmen: Lauri Nikulainen; Daniel Österholm

10 April 2017; 18:30	JYP	2–0 (0–0, 1–0, 1–0)	KalPa	Synergia-areena, Jyväskylä; Attendance: 4,102

Game reference
Juho Olkinuora	Goalies	Eero Kilpeläinen	Referees: Timo Favorin; Jari-Pekka Pajula; Linesmen: Pasi Nieminen; Sakari Suominen
M. Kalteva (J. Nättinen) – 32:40 / 1–0; A. Suomela (M. Kuukka, J. Pulli) – 53:35 / 2–0			Referees: Timo Favorin; Jari-Pekka Pajula; Linesmen: Pasi Nieminen; Sakari Suominen
10 min	Penalties	8 min	Referees: Timo Favorin; Jari-Pekka Pajula; Linesmen: Pasi Nieminen; Sakari Suominen
28	Shots	25	Referees: Timo Favorin; Jari-Pekka Pajula; Linesmen: Pasi Nieminen; Sakari Suominen

12 April 2017; 18:30	KalPa	2–0 (1–0, 1–0, 0–0)	JYP	Niiralan monttu, Kuopio; Attendance: 4,150

Game reference
Eero Kilpeläinen	Goalies	Juho Olkinuora	Referees: Timo Favorin; Kristian Vikman; Linesmen: Pasi Nieminen; Sakari Suominen
J. Keränen (J. Lyytinen) (PP1) – 05:37 / 1–0; M. Pitkänen (E. Luostarinen, A. Ilomäki) – 34:30 / 2–0			Referees: Timo Favorin; Kristian Vikman; Linesmen: Pasi Nieminen; Sakari Suominen
6 min	Penalties	10 min	Referees: Timo Favorin; Kristian Vikman; Linesmen: Pasi Nieminen; Sakari Suominen
25	Shots	23	Referees: Timo Favorin; Kristian Vikman; Linesmen: Pasi Nieminen; Sakari Suominen

13 April 2017; 18:30	JYP	4–2 (1–0, 2–2, 1–0)	KalPa	Synergia-areena, Jyväskylä; Attendance: 3,861

Game reference

Juho Olkinuora
Goalies
Eero Kilpeläinen
Referees:
Mikko Kaukokari
Anssi Salonen
Linesmen:
Lauri Nikulainen
Daniel Österholm

M. Kuukka (U. Vaakanainen, R. Rooba) – 02:01	1–0
	1–1	30:03 – J. Rissanen (J. Timonen, J. Keränen) (DP)
	1–2	36:16 – M. Seppälä (N. Mikkola, M. Nuutinen) (DP)
J. Nättinen (R. Rooba, A. Suomela) – 37:48	2–2
J. Hytönen (J. Tavi, M. Kalteva) – 39:02	3–2
A. Löfman (N. Friman, M. Kuukka) – 55:51	4–2

14 min
Penalties
10 min
29
Shots
22

15 April 2017; 17:00	KalPa	5–1 (2–1, 1–0, 2–0)	JYP	Niiralan monttu, Kuopio; Attendance: 5,064

Game reference

Eero Kilpeläinen
Goalies
Juho Olkinuora
Referees:
Stefan Fonselius
Jari-Pekka Pajula
Linesmen:
Pasi Nieminen
Sakari Suominen

T. Jokinen – 03:10	1–0
	1–1	09:20 – T. Pihlman (M. Kalteva, J. Nättinen) (PP1)
A. Ilomäki (E. Luostarinen, M. Pitkänen) – 13:42	2–1
J. Keränen (M. Nuutinen, B. Sebok) – 30:02	3–1
J. Mankinen (J. Keränen) – 54:17	4–1
J. Rissanen (EN, DP) – 58:29	5–1

2 min
Penalties
4 min
29
Shots
32

KalPa wins the series 4–3.

=== Bronze medal game ===
21 April 2017; 18:30	JYP	6–5 1OT (2–2, 2–1, 1–2, 1–0)	HIFK	Synergia-areena, Jyväskylä; Attendance: 3,916

Game reference

Juho Olkinuora
Goalies
Kevin Lankinen
Referees:
Petri Lindqvist
Jari-Pekka Pajula
Linesmen:
Tommi Niittylä
Hannu Sormunen

J. Hytönen (J. Kolehmainen, J. Tavi) – 06:46	1–0
J. Tavi (J. Nättinen, M. Kalteva) (PP1) – 07:52	2–0
	2–1	13:52 – J. Puustinen (J. Rask, R. Hintz)
	2–2	16:03 – J. Rask (J. Puustinen, R. Hintz)
J. Hytönen (N. Yonkman, S. Niku) – 29:54	3–2
	3–3	34:52 – R. Hintz (J. Puustinen)
H. Kanninen (S. Niku) – 39:48	4–3
	4–4	55:20 – J. Puustinen (R. Hintz, J. Rask)
S. Niku (M. Miklík, A. Löfman) (PP1) – 57:06	5–4
	5–5	57:31 – J. Puustinen (S. Salmela, R. Hintz)
M. Miklík (J. Tuppurainen) – 60:45	6–5

4 min
Penalties
6 min
31
Shots
26

=== Finals (best-of-seven) ===
18 April 2017; 18:30	Tappara	2–3 (1–1, 0–1, 1–1)	KalPa	Tampere Ice Stadium, Tampere; Attendance: 6,162

Game reference

Dominik Hrachovina
Goalies
Eero Kilpeläinen
Referees:
Stefan Fonselius
Mikko Kaukokari
Linesmen:
Henri Neva
Hannu Sormunen

	0–1	09:45 – J. Junnila (M. Myttynen, J. Riikola)
V. Savinainen (H. Haapala) – 10:02	1–1
	1–2	32:54 – M. Myttynen (A. Ilomäki, J. Junnila) (PP1)
	1–3	41:06 – T. Jokinen (M. Nuutinen, J. Riikola)
K. Kuusela (J. Lajunen) – 43:16	2–3

10 min
Penalties
10 min
32
Shots
23

20 April 2017; 18:30	KalPa	3–2 (0–1, 2–0, 1–1)	Tappara	Niiralan monttu, Kuopio; Attendance: 5,064

Game reference

Eero Kilpeläinen
Goalies
~~Dominik Hrachovina~~
Teemu Lassila
Referees:
Timo Favorin
Anssi Salonen
Linesmen:
Pasi Nieminen
Sakari Suominen

	0–1	15:36 – J. Jasu (M. Røymark, A. Salonen)
M. Myttynen (J. Mankinen, J. Lyytinen) – 24:10	1–1
J. Junnila (N. Mikkola, A. Ilomäki) – 28:13	2–1
N. Mikkola (S. Mutanen) – 41:14	3–1
	3–2	57:59 – V. Kemiläinen (H. Haapala, V. Savinainen)

6 min
Penalties
6 min
14
Shots
33

22 April 2017; 17:00	Tappara	2–1 (0–0, 1–0, 1–1)	KalPa	Tampere Ice Stadium, Tampere; Attendance: 7,300

Game reference

Dominik Hrachovina
Goalies
Eero Kilpeläinen
Referees:
Jari Levonen
Teemu Salminen
Linesmen:
Jani Pesonen
Teemu Riikonen

K. Kuusela (J. Järvinen, J. Peltola) – 24:00	1–0
	1–1	43:15 – J. Mankinen (J. Rissanen, J. Lyytinen)
O. Rantakari (D. Hrachovina) (PP1) – 58:27	2–1

12 min
Penalties
28 min
24
Shots
22

24 April 2017; 18:30	KalPa	2–5 (0–1, 2–3, 0–1)	Tappara	Niiralan monttu, Kuopio; Attendance: 5,064

Game reference
~~Eero Kilpeläinen~~; Denis Godla	Goalies	Dominik Hrachovina	Referees: Timo Favorin; Anssi Salonen; Linesmen: Lauri Nikulainen; Daniell Österholm
8 min	Penalties	8 min	Referees: Timo Favorin; Anssi Salonen; Linesmen: Lauri Nikulainen; Daniell Österholm
26	Shots	27	Referees: Timo Favorin; Anssi Salonen; Linesmen: Lauri Nikulainen; Daniell Österholm

25 April 2017; 18:30	Tappara	2–1 (0–0, 1–0, 1–1)	KalPa	Tampere Ice Stadium, Tampere; Attendance: 7,300

Game reference

27 April 2017; 18:30	KalPa	1–3 (0–0, 1–1, 0–2)	Tappara	Niiralan monttu, Kuopio; Attendance: 5,064

Game reference

Tappara wins the finals 4–2.

== Final rankings ==
Gold medal	Tappara
Silver medal	KalPa
Bronze medal	JYP
4	HIFK
5	TPS
6	HPK
7	Pelicans
8	Ilves
9	Ässät
10	Kärpät
11	Jukurit
12	Lukko
13	KooKoo
14	Sport
15	SaiPa
