= Santeri (given name) =

Santeri is a Finnish male given name.

== People with the given name ==
The following people are Finnish unless otherwise stated.

- Santeri Airola, ice hockey player
- Santeri Alatalo, Finnish-Swiss ice hockey player
- Santeri Alkio, politician, author and journalist
- Santeri Haapanen, politician
- Santeri Haarala, footballer
- Santeri Hatakka, ice hockey player
- Santeri Heiskanen, ice hockey player
- Santeri Hostikka, footballer
- Santeri Immonen, ice hockey player
- Santeri Kiiveri, para alpine skier
- Santeri Kinnunen, actor
- Santeri Levas, writer and photographer
- Santeri Lukka, ice hockey player
- Santeri Mäkelä, writer and politician
- Santeri Mäkinen, footballer
- Santeri Nuorteva, journalist and politician
- Santeri Pakkanen, footballer
- Santeri Paloniemi, alpine skier
- Santeri Saari, ice hockey player
- Santeri Salokivi, landscape painter
- Santeri Vuoti, ice hockey player
- Santeri Väänänen, footballer
