= Keränen =

Keränen is a Finnish surname. Notable people with the surname include:

- Carrie Keranen, American voice actress and voice director
- Greg Keranen, American bass guitarist
- Iikka Keränen, Finnish video game programmer
- Janne Keränen (born 1987), Finnish ice hockey player
- Juho Keränen (born 1985), Finnish ice hockey player
- Michael Keränen (born 1990), Finnish ice hockey player
- Rami Keränen, Finnish guitarist
- Toni Keränen (born 1998), Finnish javelin thrower
- Noora Kaisa Keränen (born 2001), Finnish biathlete
