= Martin Berger =

Martin Berger may refer to:

- Martin Berger (ice hockey) (born 1996), Finnish ice hockey player
- Martin Berger (musician) (born 1972), German conductor, choral director, organist and musicologist
