= Miska =

Miska may refer to:

== People ==
- Miska III Atyusz, Hungarian noble
- Brad Miska, American film producer
- Pali Miska, Albanian politician
- Miska Humaloja, Finnish ice hockey player
- Miska Magyarics, Hungarian Slovene poet
- Miska Petersham, American writer
- Miska Rautiola (born 1998), Finnish footballer
- Miska Siikonen, Finnish ice hockey player

== Other ==
- Miska, Tulkarm, a depopulated Palestinian village
- Miska the Magnate, a 1916 Hungarian film
- Miska the Wolf-Spider, a Dungeons & Dragons demon lord
