= Vuoti =

Surname list

Vuoti is a surname. Notable people with the surname include:

- Santeri Vuoti (born 1995), Finnish ice hockey player
- Sauli Vuoti (born 1979), Finnish musician and chemist
