= Jaakko Rissanen =

Finnish ice hockey player

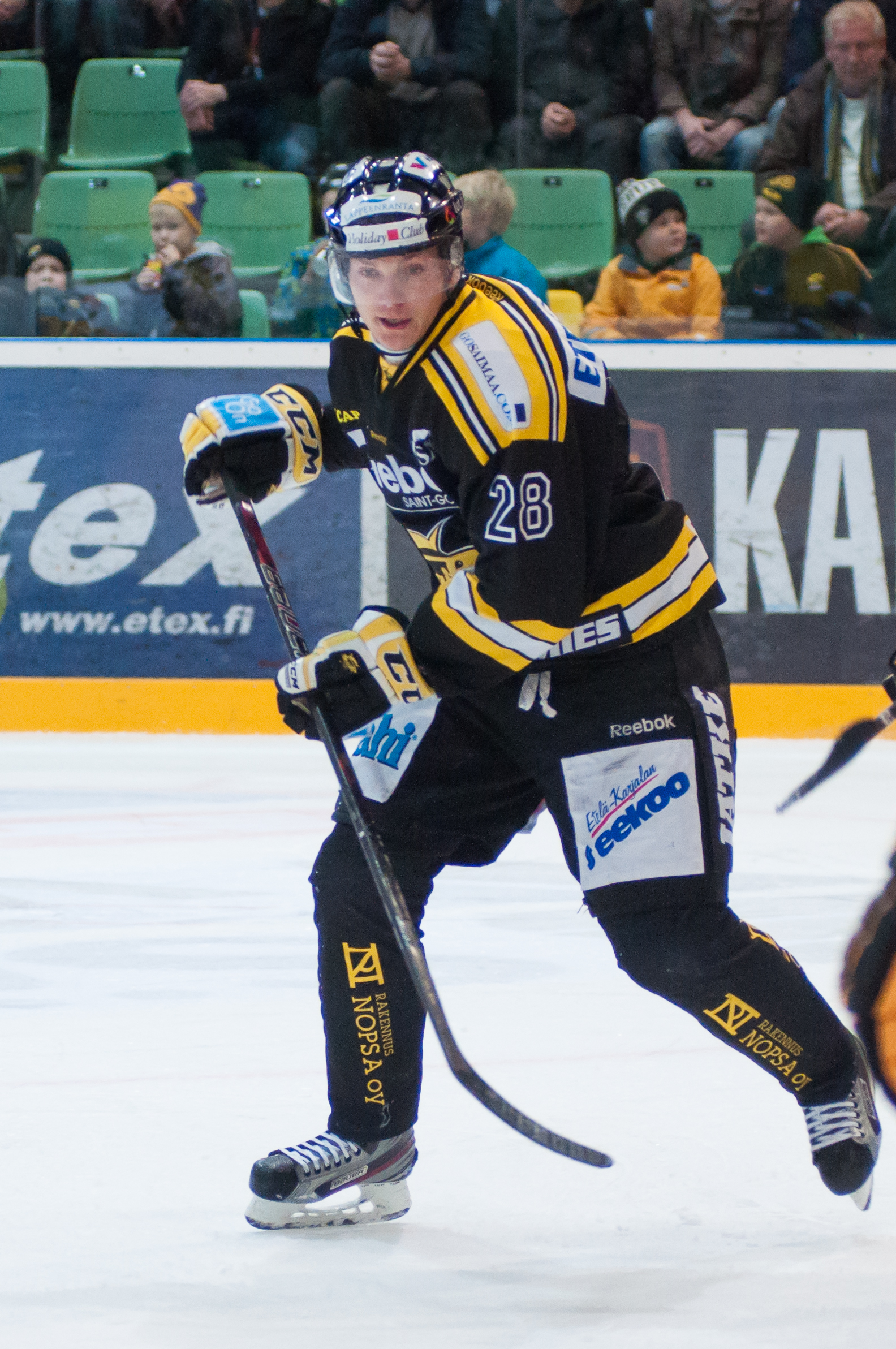
- Born: November 12, 1989 (age 35); Kuopio, Finland
- Height: 6 ft 0 in (183 cm)
- Weight: 187 lb (85 kg; 13 st 5 lb)
- Position: Forward
- Shoots: Left
- SHL team Former teams: Linköpings HC; KalPa; SaiPa; HC Vityaz; Kunlun Red Star
- Playing career: 2009–present

Jaakko Rissanen (born November 12, 1989) is a Finnish professional ice hockey player who currently plays for Linköpings HC in the Swedish Hockey League (SHL).

== Playing career ==
He previously played for KalPa and SaiPa in the Finnish Liiga. Following the 2016–17 season, his 8th in Finland, Rissanen left as a free agent seeking a new challenge in agreeing to a two-year contract with Russian club, HC Vityaz of the KHL on May 3, 2017.

In the 2017–18 season, Rissanen made his debut with Vityaz, and appeared in 21 games for 8 points before he was traded to Kunlun Red Star in exchange for fellow Finnish forward Matias Myttynen on November 6, 2017.

On June 3, 2019, Rissanen again left KalPa for the third time following the 2018–19 season, agreeing to a one-year contract with Swedish outfit, Linköpings HC of the SHL.
