= Juha Uotila =

Finnish ice hockey player

- Born: 12 January 1985 (age 41) Espoo, Finland
- Height: 6 ft 0 in (183 cm)
- Weight: 198 lb (90 kg; 14 st 2 lb)
- Position: Defence
- Shot: Left
- Suomi-sarja team Former teams: Kiekko-Espoo; Pelicans; HeKi; JYP
- NHL draft: Undrafted
- Playing career: 2003–2019

Juha Uotila is a Finnish professional ice hockey defenceman who currently plays for Kiekko-Espoo of the Suomi-sarja.

Uotila played hockey for the University of Nebraska-Omaha Mavericks. He played one season with the Toronto Marlies of the American Hockey League before returning to Europe.

== Career statistics ==
			Regular season					Playoffs
Season	Team	League	GP	G	A	Pts	PIM	GP	G	A	Pts	PIM
2000–01	HIFK U16	U16 SM-sarja	12	0	5	5	20	8	2	3	5	4
2001–02	HIFK U18	U18 SM-sarja	27	4	6	10	8	8	3	1	4	0
2002–03	HIFK U18	U18 SM-sarja	15	3	2	5	8	2	2	0	2	10
2002–03	HIFK U20	U20 SM-liiga	22	0	1	1	16	—	—	—	—	—
2003–04	HIFK U20	U20 SM-liiga	41	7	13	20	36	6	0	1	1	2
2003–04	Suomi U20	Mestis	4	0	0	0	0	—	—	—	—	—
2004–05	HIFK U20	U20 SM-liiga	28	4	10	14	97	3	1	0	1	0
2004–05	HC Salamat	Mestis	6	0	3	3	10	—	—	—	—	—
2005–06	University of Nebraska Omaha	NCAA	41	1	14	15	39	—	—	—	—	—
2006–07	University of Nebraska Omaha	NCAA	40	5	18	23	51	—	—	—	—	—
2007–08	University of Nebraska Omaha	NCAA	22	1	14	15	14	—	—	—	—	—
2008–09	Toronto Marlies	AHL	45	0	9	9	24	—	—	—	—	—
2009–10	Lahti Pelicans	SM-liiga	49	3	7	10	77	—	—	—	—	—
2010–11	Lahti Pelicans	SM-liiga	47	4	6	10	85	—	—	—	—	—
2010–11	HeKi	Mestis	2	2	1	3	4	—	—	—	—	—
2011–12	IK Oskarshamn	HockeyAllsvenskan	50	6	6	12	72	—	—	—	—	—
2012–13	IK Oskarshamn	HockeyAllsvenskan	48	1	11	12	96	—	—	—	—	—
2013–14	IK Oskarshamn	HockeyAllsvenskan	48	4	3	7	83	—	—	—	—	—
2014–15	HC Vita Hästen	HockeyAllsvenskan	51	2	4	6	54	—	—	—	—	—
2015–16	VIK Västerås HK	HockeyAllsvenskan	45	1	10	11	103	—	—	—	—	—
2016–17	JYP Jyväskylä	Liiga	29	1	0	1	2	2	0	1	1	2
2016–17	JYP-Akatemia	Mestis	10	0	1	1	8	—	—	—	—	—
2017–18	Fehérvár AV19	EBEL	54	1	13	14	38	—	—	—	—	—
2018–19	Kiekko-Espoo	Suomi-sarja	11	0	7	7	2	5	0	0	0	29
AHL totals			45	0	9	9	24	—	—	—	—	—
SM-liiga totals			125	8	13	21	164	2	0	1	1	2
Mestis totals			22	2	5	7	22	—	—	—	—	—
HockeyAllsvenskan totals			242	14	34	48	408	—	—	—	—	—
