= Kai Kantola =

Finnish-American ice hockey player

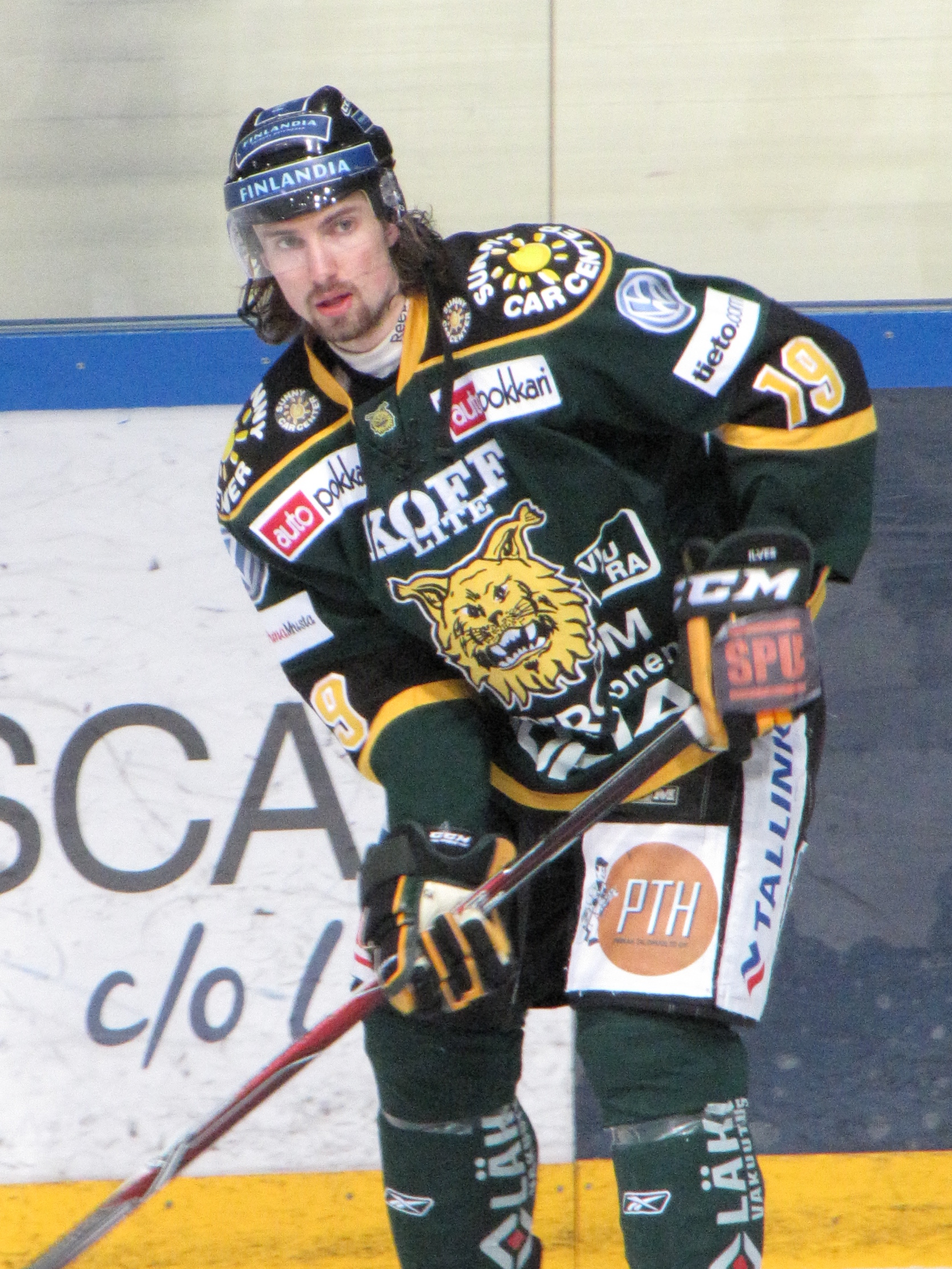
- Born: September 11, 1987 (age 38) North York, Ontario, Canada
- Height: 6 ft 2 in (188 cm)
- Weight: 205 lb (93 kg; 14 st 9 lb)
- Position: Right wing
- Shot: Right
- Played for: Norfolk Admirals; Ilves; Espoo Blues; KooKoo; HIFK; KalPa; Black Wings Linz; HC TPS
- NHL draft: Undrafted
- Playing career: 2009–2023

Kai Kantola (born September 11, 1987) is a Finnish-American professional ice hockey forward who currently plays for KalPa of the Finnish Liiga.

== Playing career ==
Kantola was born in North York, Ontario, Canada, to Finnish parents, and he has dual citizenship of Finland and the United States. He was raised in Raleigh, North Carolina, U.S., and first played midget hockey with the East Coast Eagles. Kantola played the U-18 level for Kiekkoreipas for a season before continuing his junior career in America with the Fargo-Moorhead Jets of the North American Hockey League. After two seasons with the Jets, Kantola committed to play collegiate hockey with Bowling Green State University.

Following completion of his full four-year tenure with the Falcons, Kantola played 2 games to end the 2009-10 season with the Norfolk Admirals of the American Hockey League. As an undrafted free agent, Kantola opted to continue his career in the familiar surroundings of Finland, signing his first professional contract with Ilves of the SM-liiga on June 1, 2010.

After four seasons with Ilves, and improving his points totals in each season whilst providing a power based style, Kantola moved to Liiga rival, the Espoo Blues on a two-year contract on April 16, 2014. Kantola was selected as the Best Player of September 2014 in the SM-liiga.

== Career statistics ==
| | | | Regular season | | | | | Playoffs |
| Season | Team | League | GP | G | A | Pts | PIM | GP | G | A | Pts | PIM |
|---|---|---|---|---|---|---|---|---|---|---|---|---|
| 2003–04 | Kiekkoreipas U18 | U18 SM-sarja | 30 | 5 | 9 | 14 | 26 | 6 | 0 | 0 | 0 | 0 |
| 2004–05 | Fargo-Moorhead Jets | NAHL | 37 | 5 | 7 | 12 | 20 | 5 | 0 | 0 | 0 | 4 |
| 2005–06 | Fargo-Moorhead Jets | NAHL | 52 | 24 | 28 | 52 | 116 | 8 | 3 | 4 | 7 | 6 |
| 2006–07 | Bowling Green University | NCAA | 36 | 5 | 6 | 11 | 14 | — | — | — | — | — |
| 2006–07 | Suomi U20 | Mestis | 2 | 0 | 0 | 0 | 2 | — | — | — | — | — |
| 2007–08 | Bowling Green University | NCAA | 28 | 6 | 7 | 13 | 60 | — | — | — | — | — |
| 2008–09 | Bowling Green University | NCAA | 36 | 12 | 6 | 18 | 63 | — | — | — | — | — |
| 2009–10 | Bowling Green University | NCAA | 35 | 5 | 7 | 12 | 44 | — | — | — | — | — |
| 2009–10 | Norfolk Admirals | AHL | 2 | 0 | 0 | 0 | 0 | — | — | — | — | — |
| 2010–11 | Ilves | SM-liiga | 56 | 5 | 8 | 13 | 24 | 5 | 1 | 1 | 2 | 0 |
| 2011–12 | Ilves | SM-liiga | 47 | 3 | 9 | 12 | 34 | — | — | — | — | — |
| 2012–13 | Ilves | SM-liiga | 37 | 11 | 11 | 22 | 86 | — | — | — | — | — |
| 2013–14 | Ilves | Liiga | 59 | 19 | 14 | 33 | 32 | — | — | — | — | — |
| 2014–15 | Espoo Blues | Liiga | 39 | 12 | 10 | 22 | 26 | 4 | 0 | 0 | 0 | 4 |
| 2015–16 | Espoo Blues | Liiga | 10 | 1 | 1 | 2 | 2 | — | — | — | — | — |
| 2015–16 | Ilves | Liiga | 49 | 7 | 12 | 19 | 52 | — | — | — | — | — |
| 2016–17 | KooKoo | Liiga | 50 | 14 | 9 | 23 | 38 | — | — | — | — | — |
| 2016–17 | HIFK | Liiga | 10 | 1 | 2 | 3 | 4 | 11 | 2 | 1 | 3 | 8 |
| 2017–18 | KalPa | Liiga | 53 | 7 | 16 | 23 | 32 | 6 | 4 | 1 | 5 | 26 |
| 2018–19 | KalPa | Liiga | 29 | 6 | 13 | 19 | 18 | — | — | — | — | — |
| 2019–20 | KalPa | Liiga | 58 | 20 | 19 | 39 | 32 | — | — | — | — | — |
| 2020–21 | KalPa | Liiga | 57 | 19 | 17 | 36 | 38 | 4 | 1 | 0 | 1 | 8 |
| 2021–22 | Black Wings Linz | ICEHL | 24 | 5 | 5 | 10 | 6 | — | — | — | — | — |
| 2022–23 | HC TPS | Liiga | 10 | 0 | 0 | 0 | 2 | — | — | — | — | — |
| 2022–23 | KalPa | Liiga | 37 | 7 | 7 | 14 | 39 | 6 | 0 | 2 | 2 | 4 |
| Liiga totals | | | 601 | 132 | 148 | 280 | 459 | 36 | 8 | 6 | 14 | 50 |
