= Mikko Nuutinen =

Finnish ice hockey player

- Born: 6 October 1990 (age 34); Kuopio, Finland
- Height: 5 ft 9 in (175 cm)
- Weight: 174 lb (79 kg; 12 st 6 lb)
- Position: Forward
- Shot: Right
- Played for: KalPa; SaPKo; HKM Zvolen; HK Dukla Michalovce
- NHL draft: Undrafted
- Playing career: 2009–2022

Mikko Nuutinen (born 6 October 1990) is a Finnish former professional ice hockey player.

== Career ==
He had played for KalPa of the SM-liiga. He previously played for the SaPKo in the Mestis. He signed a contract extension with KalPa in 2017.

== Career statistics ==
=== Regular season and playoffs ===
			Regular season					Playoffs
Season	Team	League	GP	G	A	Pts	PIM	GP	G	A	Pts	PIM
2008–09	KalPa	Jr. A	42	19	14	33	42	5	0	0	0	39
2009–10	KalPa	Jr. A	28	19	13	32	28	3	1	0	1	0
2009–10	KalPa	SM-liiga	1	0	0	0	0	—	—	—	—	—
2009–10	Suomi U20	Mestis	4	1	0	1	6	—	—	—	—	—
2010–11	KalPa	Jr. A	2	0	1	1	0	—	—	—	—	—
2010–11	KalPa	SM-liiga	2	0	0	0	0	—	—	—	—	—
2010–11	SaPKo	Mestis	27	7	6	13	45	4	1	0	1	16
2011–12	SaPKo	Mestis	46	11	15	26	40	4	1	0	1	4
2012–13	SaPKo	Mestis	48	14	19	33	42	—	—	—	—	—
2013–14	SaPKo	Mestis	56	19	16	35	44	—	—	—	—	—
2014–15	KalPa	Liiga	2	0	0	0	2	—	—	—	—	—
2014–15	SaPKo	Mestis	47	20	24	44	48	7	2	0	2	4
2015–16	KalPa	Liiga	58	5	10	15	24	3	0	0	0	2
2016–17	KalPa	Liiga	58	11	15	26	46	18	1	3	4	16
2017–18	KalPa	Liiga	58	11	17	28	28	6	0	2	2	16
2018–19	KalPa	Liiga	59	11	19	30	24	—	—	—	—	—
2019–20	KalPa	Liiga	57	6	19	25	30	—	—	—	—	—
2020–21	HKM Zvolen	Slovak	49	18	31	49	72	14	6	9	15	14
Liiga totals			295	44	80	124	154	27	1	5	6	34
Slovak totals			49	18	31	49	72	14	6	9	15	14

== Awards and honors ==
Award	Year
Slovak
Champion	2021
