= Tapio Laakso =

Finnish ice hockey player

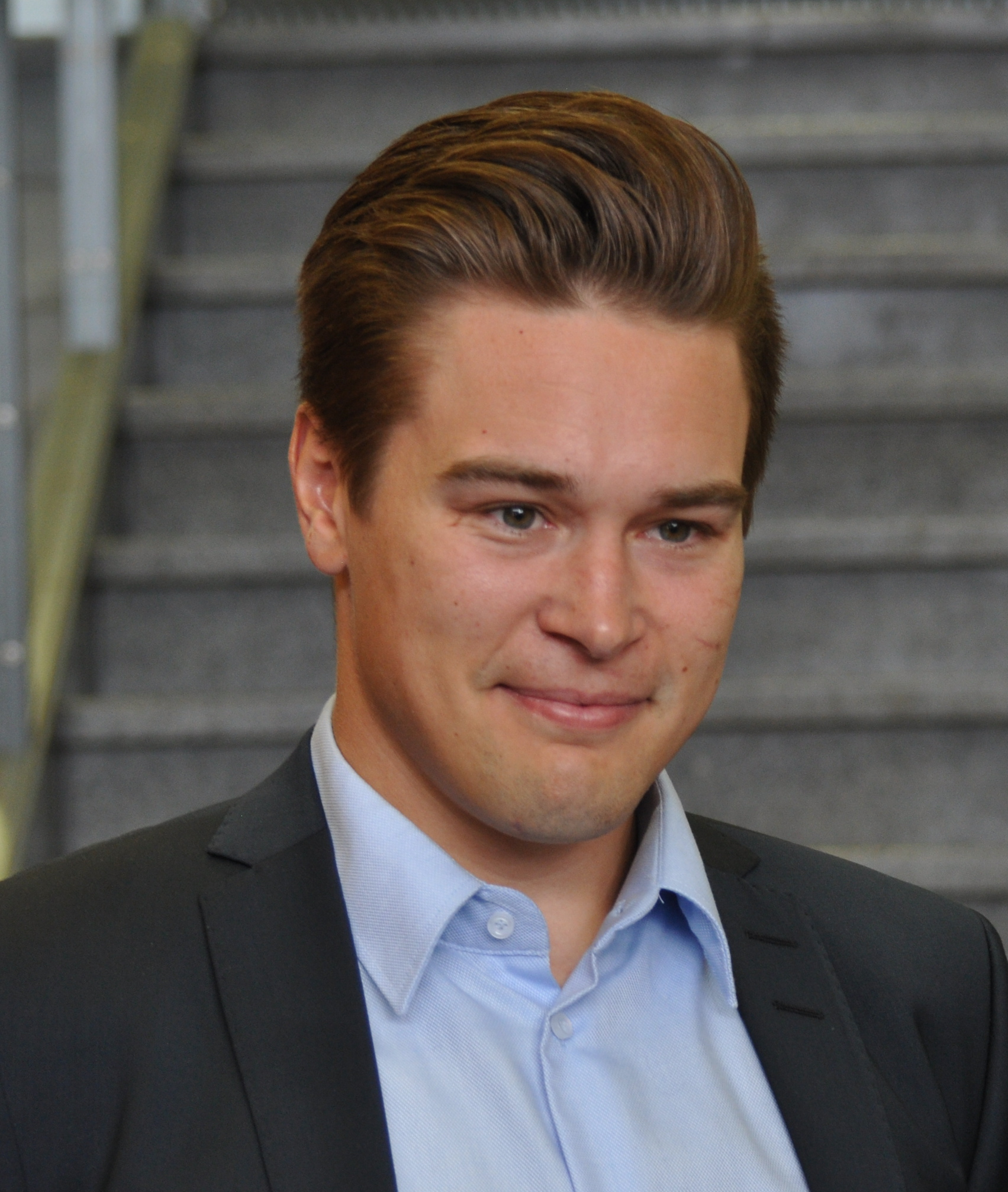
- Tapio Laakso in 2015.
- Born: June 28, 1985 (age 39); Rymättylä, Finland
- Height: 6 ft 0 in (183 cm)
- Weight: 194 lb (88 kg; 13 st 12 lb)
- Position: Forward
- Shot: Left
- Played for: TUTO Hockey; KalPa; HC TPS; Ilves; Lukko
- National team: Finland
- NHL draft: Undrafted
- Playing career: 2002–2020

Tapio Laakso (born June 28, 1985) is a Finnish ice hockey centre. He is currently playing with Lukko in the Finnish Liiga.

Laakso made his SM-liiga debut playing with KalPa during the 2007–08 season.

== Career statistics ==
| | | | Regular season | | | | | Playoffs |
| Season | Team | League | GP | G | A | Pts | PIM | GP | G | A | Pts | PIM |
|---|---|---|---|---|---|---|---|---|---|---|---|---|
| 2000–01 | TUTO Hockey U16 | U16 SM-sarja | 12 | 5 | 4 | 9 | 4 | 3 | 1 | 0 | 1 | 2 |
| 2001–02 | TUTO Hockey U18 | U18 I-Divisioona | 12 | 9 | 7 | 16 | 4 | 8 | 7 | 5 | 12 | 6 |
| 2001–02 | TUTO Hockey U20 | U20 SM-liiga | 1 | 0 | 1 | 1 | 0 | — | — | — | — | — |
| 2002–03 | TUTO Hockey U18 | U18 SM-sarja | 28 | 21 | 30 | 51 | 26 | 4 | 0 | 2 | 2 | 0 |
| 2002–03 | TUTO Hockey U20 | U20 I-Divisioona | 1 | 0 | 1 | 1 | 0 | — | — | — | — | — |
| 2002–03 | TUTO Hockey | Mestis | 3 | 0 | 0 | 0 | 2 | — | — | — | — | — |
| 2003–04 | TUTO Hockey U20 | U20 I-Divisioona | 2 | 0 | 0 | 0 | 0 | — | — | — | — | — |
| 2003–04 | TUTO Hockey | Mestis | 41 | 6 | 7 | 13 | 6 | — | — | — | — | — |
| 2004–05 | TUTO Hockey U20 | U20 I-Divisioona | 9 | 10 | 10 | 20 | 4 | — | — | — | — | — |
| 2004–05 | TUTO Hockey | Mestis | 43 | 5 | 9 | 14 | 10 | 8 | 1 | 2 | 3 | 4 |
| 2005–06 | TUTO Hockey U20 | U20 I-Divisioona | 10 | 7 | 9 | 16 | 4 | 1 | 2 | 2 | 4 | 0 |
| 2005–06 | TUTO Hockey | Mestis | 44 | 11 | 13 | 24 | 24 | 7 | 1 | 3 | 4 | 6 |
| 2006–07 | TUTO Hockey | Mestis | 45 | 12 | 23 | 35 | 52 | 7 | 1 | 0 | 1 | 0 |
| 2007–08 | KalPa | SM-liiga | 53 | 8 | 15 | 23 | 47 | — | — | — | — | — |
| 2008–09 | KalPa | SM-liiga | 58 | 11 | 14 | 25 | 32 | 12 | 1 | 2 | 3 | 6 |
| 2009–10 | KalPa | SM-liiga | 58 | 12 | 7 | 19 | 26 | 13 | 1 | 3 | 4 | 10 |
| 2010–11 | KalPa | SM-liiga | 60 | 7 | 15 | 22 | 73 | 7 | 2 | 0 | 2 | 29 |
| 2011–12 | HC TPS | SM-liiga | 55 | 5 | 9 | 14 | 34 | 2 | 0 | 0 | 0 | 6 |
| 2012–13 | HC TPS | SM-liiga | 55 | 4 | 9 | 13 | 28 | — | — | — | — | — |
| 2013–14 | HC TPS | Liiga | 39 | 3 | 5 | 8 | 10 | — | — | — | — | — |
| 2014–15 | Ilves | Liiga | 52 | 17 | 17 | 34 | 22 | 2 | 0 | 0 | 0 | 0 |
| 2015–16 | Ilves | Liiga | 44 | 9 | 10 | 19 | 36 | — | — | — | — | — |
| 2016–17 | Ilves | Liiga | 59 | 9 | 24 | 33 | 30 | 10 | 2 | 5 | 7 | 0 |
| 2017–18 | Ilves | Liiga | 53 | 13 | 11 | 24 | 24 | — | — | — | — | — |
| 2018–19 | Lukko | Liiga | 60 | 8 | 6 | 14 | 20 | 7 | 1 | 1 | 2 | 4 |
| 2019–20 | Lukko | Liiga | 29 | 2 | 2 | 4 | 16 | — | — | — | — | — |
| Liiga totals | | | 675 | 108 | 144 | 252 | 398 | 53 | 7 | 11 | 18 | 55 |
