= Dominik Hrachovina =

Czech professional ice hockey goaltender (born 1994)

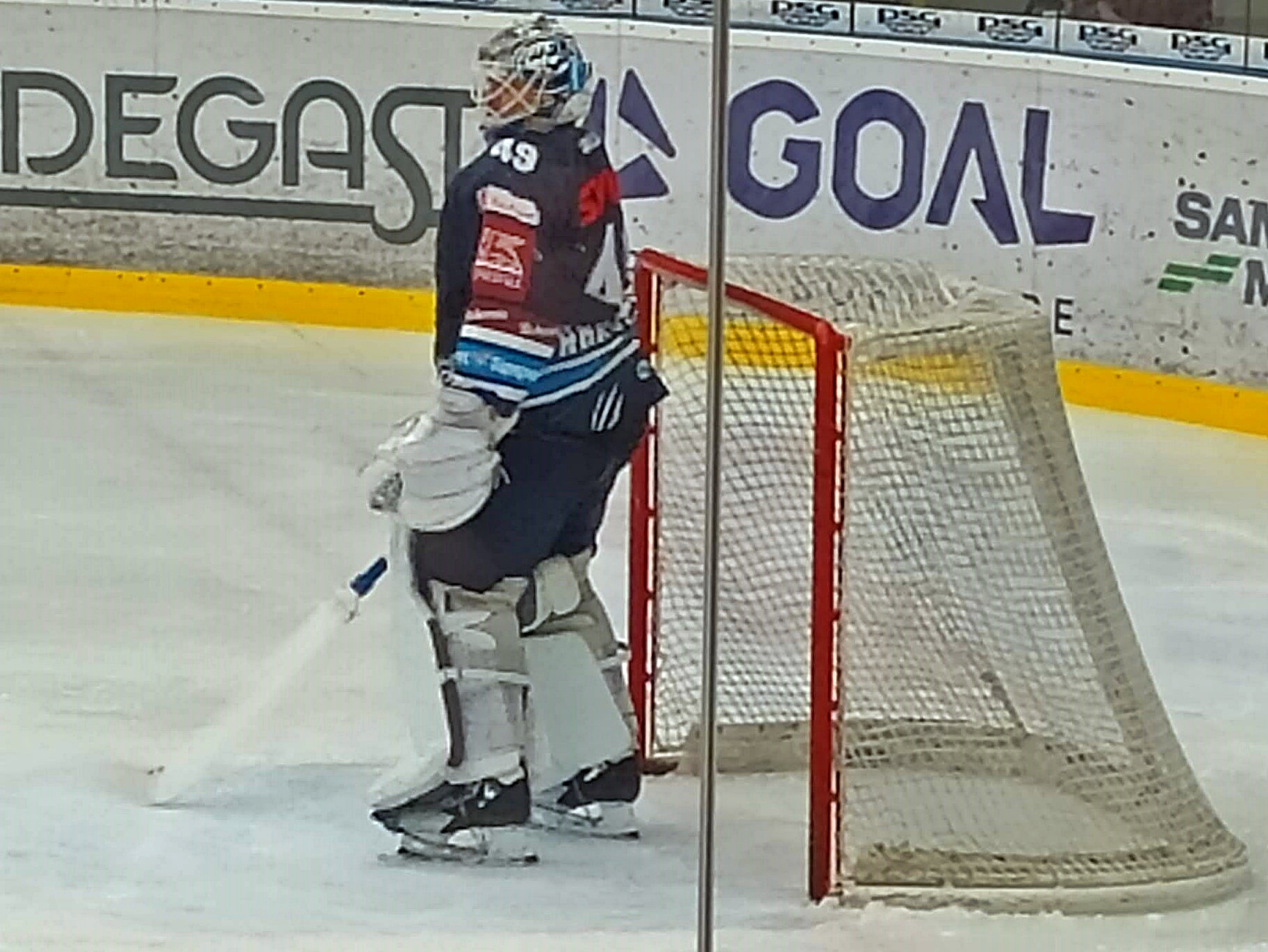
- Born: 29 August 1994 (age 32) Brno, Czech Republic
- Height: 5 ft 11 in (180 cm)
- Weight: 190 lb (86 kg; 13 st 8 lb)
- Position: Goaltender
- Catches: Left
- ELH team Former teams: Motor České Budějovice; Tappara; HPK; Barys Astana; HC Ambrì-Piotta; HC Bílí Tygři Liberec
- National team: Czech Republic
- Playing career: 2012–present

Dominik Hrachovina (born 29 August 1994) is a Czech professional ice hockey goaltender. He is currently playing for Motor České Budějovice of the Czech Extraliga (ELH)

== Playing career ==
Hrachovina made his Liiga debut playing with Tappara during the 2012–13 SM-liiga season. However, he would be a backup goalie in official matches until the 2014–15 season, when he played a Champions Hockey League match against HC Oceláři Třinec in Třinec, Czech Republic. He had 31 saves and allowed only one goal in a 2–1 victory. Later in the same season, he played another CHL game and three regular season matches in SM-liiga.

In the 2015–16 Liiga season he gained some attention as he played 19 regular season matches, two of which on loan in HPK, and also two play-off matches as Tappara went all the way to the championship. In the 2016-17 Liiga season, Hrachovina finally gained the position of primary starting goalie of Tappara and led his team to another championship. His contract ended with Tappara in 2018.

After spending the 2018–19 season in the Kontinental Hockey League, featuring in 22 games with Kazakh-based Barys Astana. Hrachovina left as a free agent, and signed to an initial 3-month contract with Swiss club, HC Ambrì-Piotta of the National League (NL) on 8 July 2019. He was signed to provide cover for injured Goaltender Benjamin Conz. After 7 games with Bern, Hrachovina left the club and returned to his native Czech Republic in signing for the remainder of the season with HC Bílí Tygři Liberec of the ELH. Hrachovina returned the 2020–2021 season to the Tappara, Finnish Championship League (Liiga) with a two-year contract.

== Personal ==
Hrachovina, who came to Finland at the age of 16, speaks fluent Finnish. He has said that after his first season in Finland, he decided to learn to speak the local language and that the learning process took a year.

== Awards and achievements ==
Finland
Award	Year
Liiga, Kanada-malja Champion	2015–16, 2016–17
Liiga, Runner-up	2017–18
Nuorten SM-liiga (A-juniors Finnish League) All-Star Team	2013–14
