= Sami Anttila =

Finnish ice hockey forward

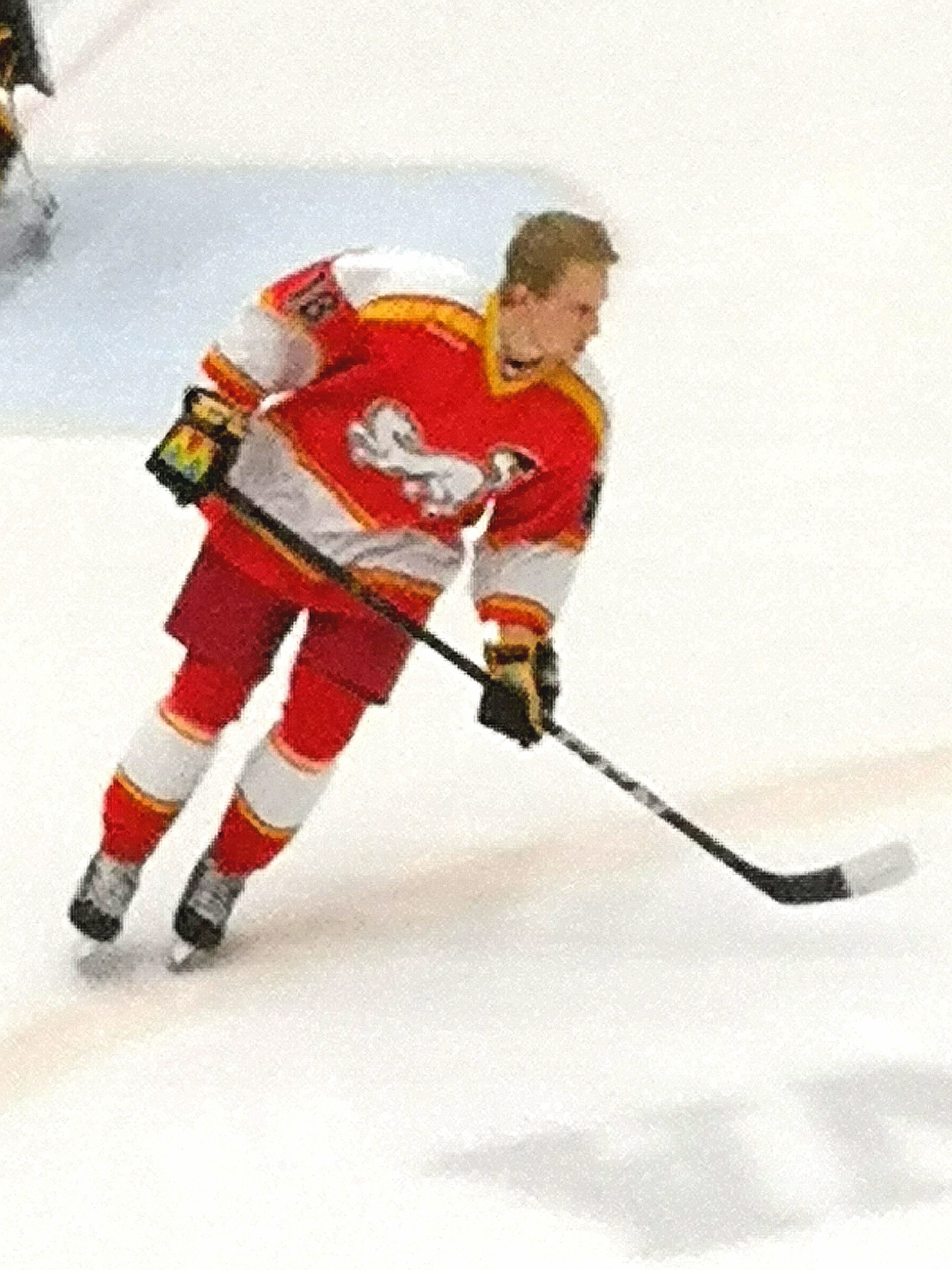
- Shown playing in 2019
- Born: 8 February 1995 (age 31) Oulu, Finland
- Height: 171 cm (5 ft 7 in)
- Weight: 79 kg (174 lb; 12 st 6 lb)
- Position: Forward
- Shot: Left
- Played for: Oulun Kärpät
- Playing career: 2015–2022

Sami Anttila (born 8 February 1995) is a Finnish former ice hockey forward who played for Oulun Kärpät of the Finnish Liiga.

== Career statistics ==
			Regular season					Playoffs
Season	Team	League	GP	G	A	Pts	PIM	GP	G	A	Pts	PIM
2009–10	Oulun Kärpät U16	U16 SM-sarja Q	6	2	2	4	2	—	—	—	—	—
2009–10	Oulun Kärpät U16	U16 SM-sarja	15	13	12	25	2	3	0	1	1	0
2010–11	Oulun Kärpät U16	U16 SM-sarja	1	2	2	4	0	—	—	—	—	—
2010–11	Oulun Kärpät U18	U18 SM-sarja Q	4	5	2	7	4	—	—	—	—	—
2010–11	Oulun Kärpät U18	U18 SM-sarja	1	0	0	0	0	6	2	0	2	0
2010–11	Oulun Kärpät U20	U20 SM-liiga	0	0	0	0	0	1	1	0	1	0
2011–12	Oulun Kärpät U18	U18 SM-sarja Q	10	5	6	11	10	—	—	—	—	—
2011–12	Oulun Kärpät U18	U18 SM-sarja	30	27	14	41	12	9	6	6	12	25
2012–13	Oulun Kärpät U18	U18 SM-sarja	4	1	1	2	8	—	—	—	—	—
2012–13	Oulun Kärpät U20	U20 SM-liiga	27	9	6	15	0	5	5	1	6	2
2013–14	Oulun Kärpät U20	U20 SM-liiga	48	34	24	58	22	12	7	7	14	2
2014–15	Oulun Kärpät U20	U20 SM-liiga	45	29	42	71	40	—	—	—	—	—
2015–16	Oulun Kärpät U20	U20 SM-liiga	6	1	6	7	0	—	—	—	—	—
2015–16	Oulun Kärpät	Liiga	3	0	0	0	0	—	—	—	—	—
2015–16	Hokki	Mestis	28	5	7	12	33	17	2	4	6	2
2016–17	Oulun Kärpät U20	U20 SM-liiga	0	0	0	0	0	5	1	5	6	0
2016–17	Oulun Kärpät	Liiga	42	4	3	7	20	2	1	2	3	0
2016–17	Hokki	Mestis	3	0	0	0	2	—	—	—	—	—
2017–18	Oulun Kärpät	Liiga	33	2	3	5	6	13	1	3	4	2
2018–19	Oulun Kärpät	Liiga	36	1	7	8	8	14	2	1	3	0
2019–20	Oulun Kärpät	Liiga	24	2	2	4	6	—	—	—	—	—
2020–21	Kiekko-Espoo	Mestis	12	6	9	15	20	2	0	2	2	2
2021–22	Kokkolan Hermes	Mestis	8	2	3	5	4	—	—	—	—	—
Liiga totals			138	9	15	24	40	29	4	6	10	2
