= Anssi Löfman =

Finnish ice hockey player

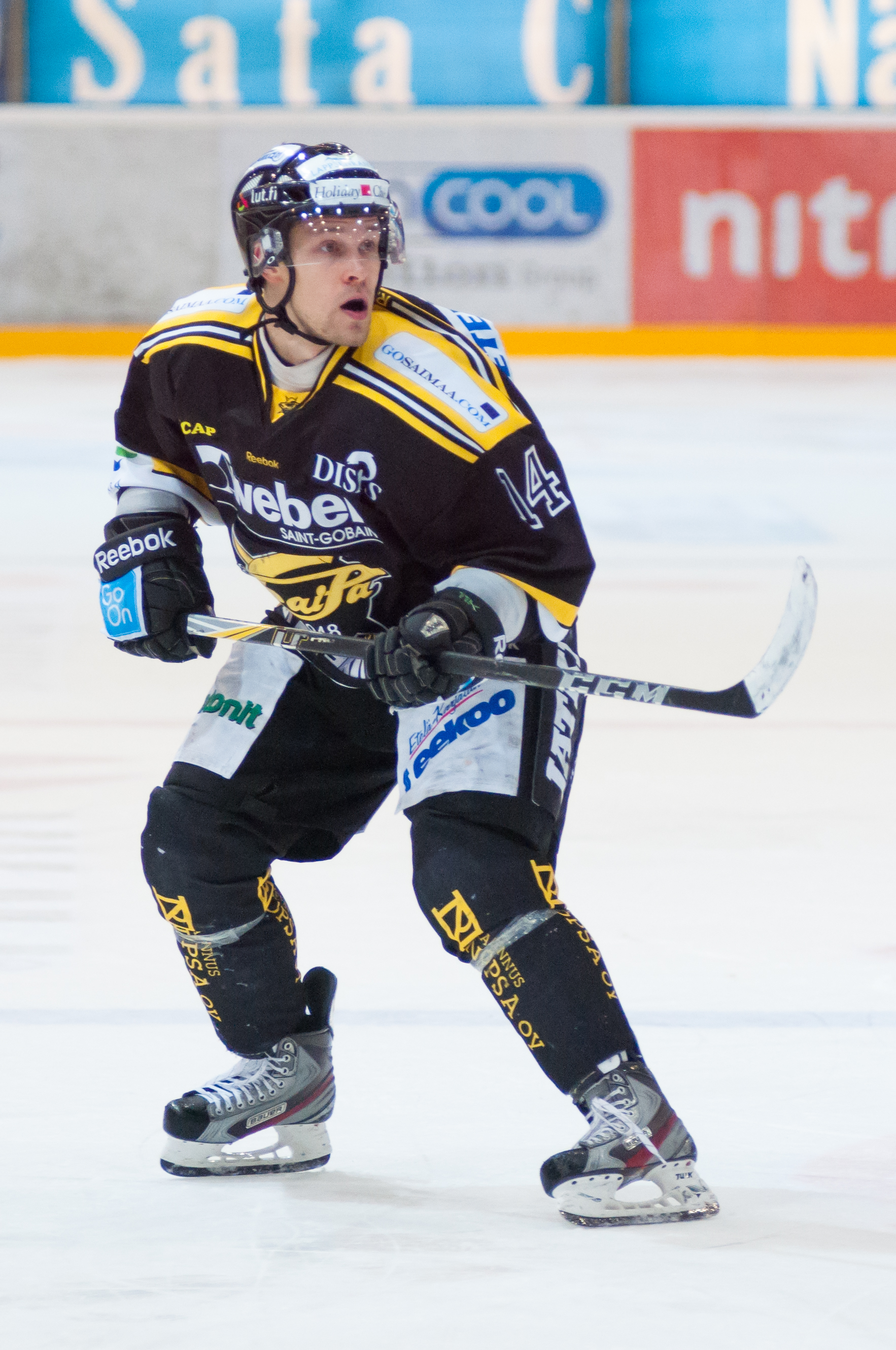
- Born: 29 June 1987 (age 37); Lappeenranta, Finland
- Height: 5 ft 10 in (178 cm)
- Weight: 176 lb (80 kg; 12 st 8 lb)
- Position: Centre
- Shot: Left
- Played for: SaiPa; JYP Jyväskylä; Mikkelin Jukurit
- Playing career: 2007–2022

Anssi Löfman (born 29 June 1987) is a Finnish ice hockey player who currently plays professionally in Finland for SaiPa of the Liiga.

== Career statistics ==
			Regular season					Playoffs
Season	Team	League	GP	G	A	Pts	PIM	GP	G	A	Pts	PIM
2002–03	SaiPa U16	U16 SM-sarja	14	3	8	11	2	—	—	—	—	—
2003–04	SaiPa U18	U18 SM-sarja	19	4	14	18	2	—	—	—	—	—
2004–05	SaiPa U18	U18 SM-sarja	12	5	4	9	6	—	—	—	—	—
2004–05	SaiPa U20	U20 SM-liiga	33	1	7	8	6	—	—	—	—	—
2005–06	SaiPa U20	U20 SM-liiga	37	6	9	15	20	—	—	—	—	—
2006–07	SaiPa U20	U20 SM-liiga	40	9	17	26	28	—	—	—	—	—
2006–07	SaiPa	SM-liiga	4	1	0	1	0	—	—	—	—	—
2006–07	Suomi U20	Mestis	4	0	0	0	0	—	—	—	—	—
2007–08	SaiPa U20	U20 SM-liiga	17	5	6	11	10	—	—	—	—	—
2007–08	SaiPa	SM-liiga	41	5	1	6	16	—	—	—	—	—
2008–09	SaiPa	SM-liiga	36	4	6	10	8	—	—	—	—	—
2009–10	SaiPa	SM-liiga	57	8	8	16	28	—	—	—	—	—
2010–11	SaiPa	SM-liiga	48	5	13	18	10	—	—	—	—	—
2011–12	SaiPa	SM-liiga	33	11	5	16	8	—	—	—	—	—
2012–13	SaiPa	SM-liiga	49	9	19	28	6	3	1	0	1	0
2013–14	JYP Jyväskylä	Liiga	38	7	11	18	12	5	2	2	4	2
2014–15	JYP Jyväskylä	Liiga	49	12	14	26	16	12	0	9	9	4
2015–16	JYP Jyväskylä	Liiga	52	13	14	27	41	11	1	5	6	2
2016–17	JYP Jyväskylä	Liiga	37	6	14	20	8	15	3	5	8	2
2017–18	SaiPa	Liiga	20	6	4	10	12	—	—	—	—	—
2018–19	SaiPa	Liiga	23	3	4	7	6	—	—	—	—	—
2019–20	SaiPa	Liiga	48	8	16	24	30	—	—	—	—	—
2020–21	Mikkelin Jukurit	Liiga	54	6	15	21	14	—	—	—	—	—
2021–22	Mikkelin Jukurit	Liiga	30	4	3	7	18	—	—	—	—	—
SM-liiga totals			619	108	147	255	233	49	7	21	28	14
