= Ville Meskanen =

Finnish ice hockey player

- Born: October 2, 1995 (age 30) Tampere, Finland
- Height: 6 ft 1 in (185 cm)
- Weight: 181 lb (82 kg; 12 st 13 lb)
- Position: Right wing
- Shoots: Right
- Liiga team Former teams: Ilves; Hartford Wolf Pack; KooKoo; SaiPa
- NHL draft: Undrafted
- Playing career: 2014–present

Ville Meskanen (born October 2, 1995) is a Finnish professional ice hockey player for Ilves of the Finnish Liiga.

== Playing career ==
Undrafted, Meskanen played as a junior within Ilves organization. After a successful Jr. A season Meskanen was signed to a one-year Liiga contract with Ilves on April 15, 2014.

Meskanen made his professional and Liiga debut playing with Ilves during the 2014–15 Liiga season. He played in a fourth line role against the Lahti Pelicans on October 8, 2014. He finished the campaign scoring 3 goals in 10 games while with the senior team.

In the 2017–18 season, Meskanen broke out offensively with Ilves, leading the club in scoring with 24 goals and 44 points in 48 games. He was signed to a two-year contract extension during the campaign on November 15, 2017.

On May 3, 2018, Meskanen, used an NHL-out clause in his contract with Ilves, in agreeing to terms with the New York Rangers of the National Hockey League (NHL).

After a successful first season in North America, posting 34 points in 70 games with the Rangers AHL affiliate, the Hartford Wolf Pack of the American Hockey League (AHL), Meskanen returned for his second season within the Rangers organization in the 2019–20 season.

Unable to replicate his offensive totals with the Wolf Pack, posting just four assists through 20 games, Meskanen opted to mutually terminate his contract with the New York Rangers on December 12, 2019. He returned to Finland to play with his original club, Ilves of the Liiga, agreeing to an optional three-year contract on December 13.

== Career statistics ==
			Regular season					Playoffs
Season	Team	League	GP	G	A	Pts	PIM	GP	G	A	Pts	PIM
2013–14	Ilves	Jr. A	34	9	5	14	2	5	3	2	5	0
2014–15	Ilves	Jr. A	35	30	32	62	28	10	3	9	12	0
2014–15	Ilves	Liiga	10	3	0	3	0	—	—	—	—	—
2014–15	LeKi	Mestis	1	0	0	0	0	—	—	—	—	—
2015–16	Ilves	Jr. A	4	2	1	3	2	7	4	3	7	0
2015–16	Ilves	Liiga	39	6	7	13	6	—	—	—	—	—
2015–16	LeKi	Mestis	16	6	4	10	10	—	—	—	—	—
2016–17	Ilves	Liiga	44	9	11	20	4	10	4	3	7	2
2017–18	Ilves	Liiga	48	24	20	44	4	—	—	—	—	—
2018–19	Hartford Wolf Pack	AHL	70	12	22	34	18	—	—	—	—	—
2019–20	Hartford Wolf Pack	AHL	20	0	4	4	6	—	—	—	—	—
2019–20	Ilves	Liiga	29	12	8	20	24	—	—	—	—	—
2020–21	Ilves	Liiga	48	15	12	27	10	3	1	1	2	0
2021–22	KooKoo	Liiga	60	18	14	32	28	16	4	3	7	4
2022–23	SaiPa	Liiga	60	21	13	34	14	—	—	—	—	—
2023–24	Ilves	Liiga	39	5	14	19	6	5	1	0	1	2
Liiga totals			377	113	99	212	96	34	10	7	17	8
