= Olli Vainio =

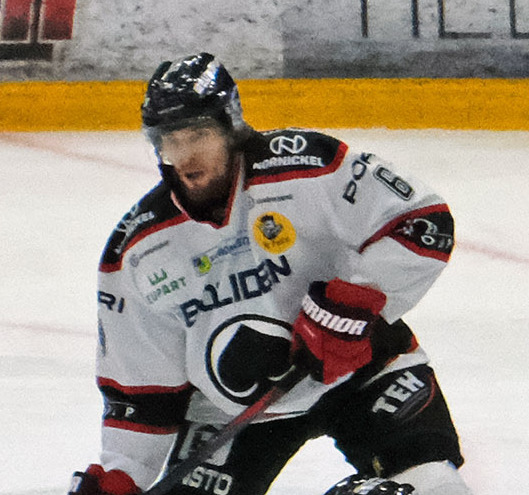
- Born: 23 April 1994 (age 32) Tampere, Finland
- Height: 185 cm (6 ft 1 in)
- Weight: 81 kg (179 lb; 12 st 11 lb)
- Position: Defense
- Shoots: Right
- Allsv team Former teams: IF Björklöven; Ilves; Lukko; Porin Ässät; HK Poprad; Södertälje SK
- Playing career: 2016–present

Olli Vainio (born 23 April 1994) is a Finnish professional ice hockey defenceman who currently playing for IF Björklöven of the HockeyAllsvenskan (Allsv).

== Playing career ==
In 2019, Vainio was signed to a contract with fellow Finnish club, Porin Ässät.

After parts of three seasons with Ässät, Vainio left the Liiga to sign a one-year deal with the Slovak club HK Poprad of the Slovak Extraliga on 26 May 2022.

Vainio moved to the Swedish HockeyAllsveskan, playing a two-year tenure with Södertälje SK, before opting to sign a one-year contract with rival club, IF Björklöven, on 13 May 2025.

== Career statistics ==
			Regular season					Playoffs
Season	Team	League	GP	G	A	Pts	PIM	GP	G	A	Pts	PIM
2011–12	Ilves	FIN U20	5	0	1	1	6	—	—	—	—	—
2012–13	Ilves	FIN U20	12	0	1	1	12	—	—	—	—	—
2013–14	Ilves	FIN U20	36	0	6	6	26	5	0	1	1	0
2014–15	Ilves	FIN U20	48	8	30	38	40	10	1	4	5	4
2015–16	Ilves	FIN U20	3	0	0	0	4	7	1	1	2	4
2015–16	Ilves	Liiga	25	0	0	0	4	—	—	—	—	—
2015–16	LeKi	Mestis	25	0	1	1	8	—	—	—	—	—
2016–17	Ilves	Liiga	51	4	14	18	16	10	0	3	3	4
2016–17	LeKi	Mestis	9	0	0	0	2	—	—	—	—	—
2017–18	Ilves	Liiga	60	1	9	10	16	—	—	—	—	—
2018–19	Ilves	Liiga	45	0	3	3	14	2	0	0	0	2
2018–19	KOOVEE	Mestis	2	0	1	1	0	—	—	—	—	—
2019–20	Lukko	Liiga	18	0	3	3	10	—	—	—	—	—
2019–20	Ässät	Liiga	40	6	12	18	16	—	—	—	—	—
2020–21	Ässät	Liiga	23	3	5	8	4	—	—	—	—	—
2021–22	Ässät	Liiga	45	2	10	12	28	—	—	—	—	—
2022–23	HK Poprad	Slovak	45	7	11	18	22	3	0	0	0	2
2023–24	Södertälje SK	Allsv	45	4	11	15	6	4	0	0	0	4
2024–25	Södertälje SK	Allsv	46	2	10	12	55	11	1	1	2	12
Liiga totals			307	16	56	72	108	12	0	3	3	6
