= Saku Salmela =

Finnish ice hockey player

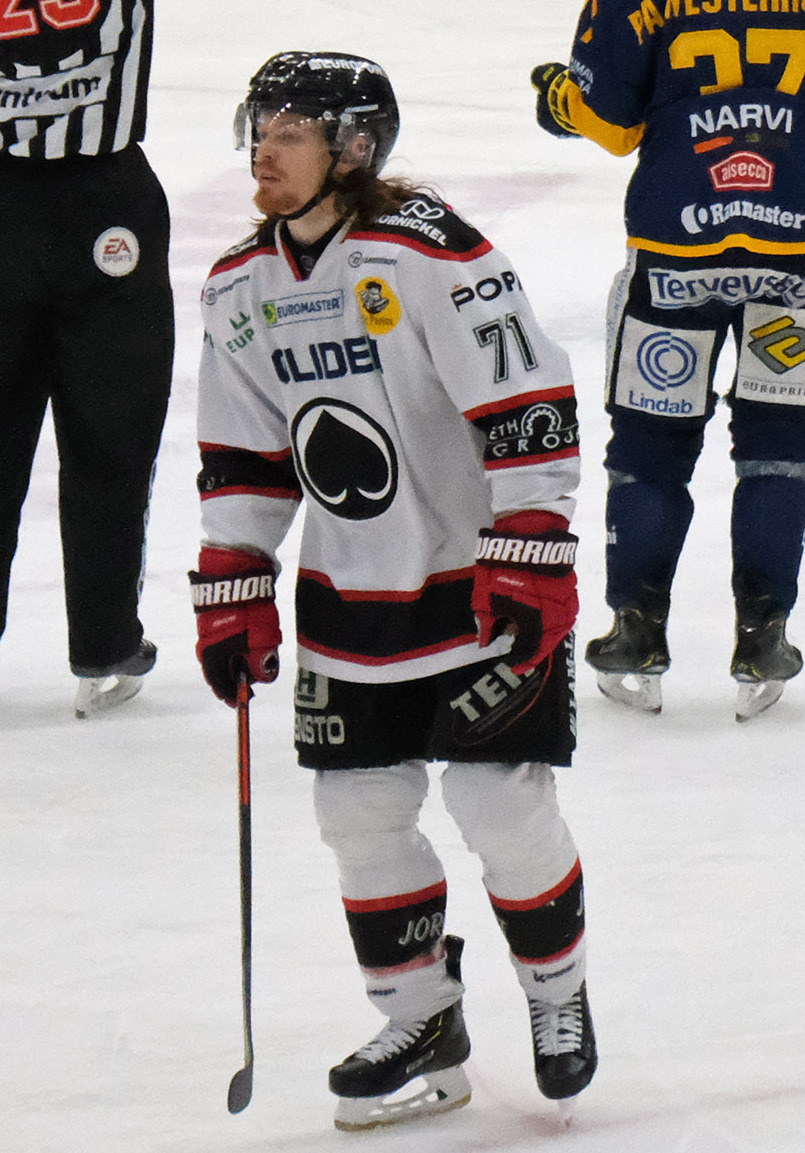
- Born: May 16, 1990 (age 34); Pori, Finland
- Height: 5 ft 9 in (175 cm)
- Weight: 181 lb (82 kg; 12 st 13 lb)
- Position: Defence
- Shoots: Left
- Liiga team: Ilves
- NHL draft: Undrafted
- Playing career: 2010–present

Saku Salmela (born May 16, 1990) is a Finnish ice hockey defenceman. He is currently playing with HIFK in the Finnish Liiga.

Salmela made his Liiga debut playing with Ilves during the 2014–15 Liiga season.
