= Juha Koivisto =

Finnish ice hockey player

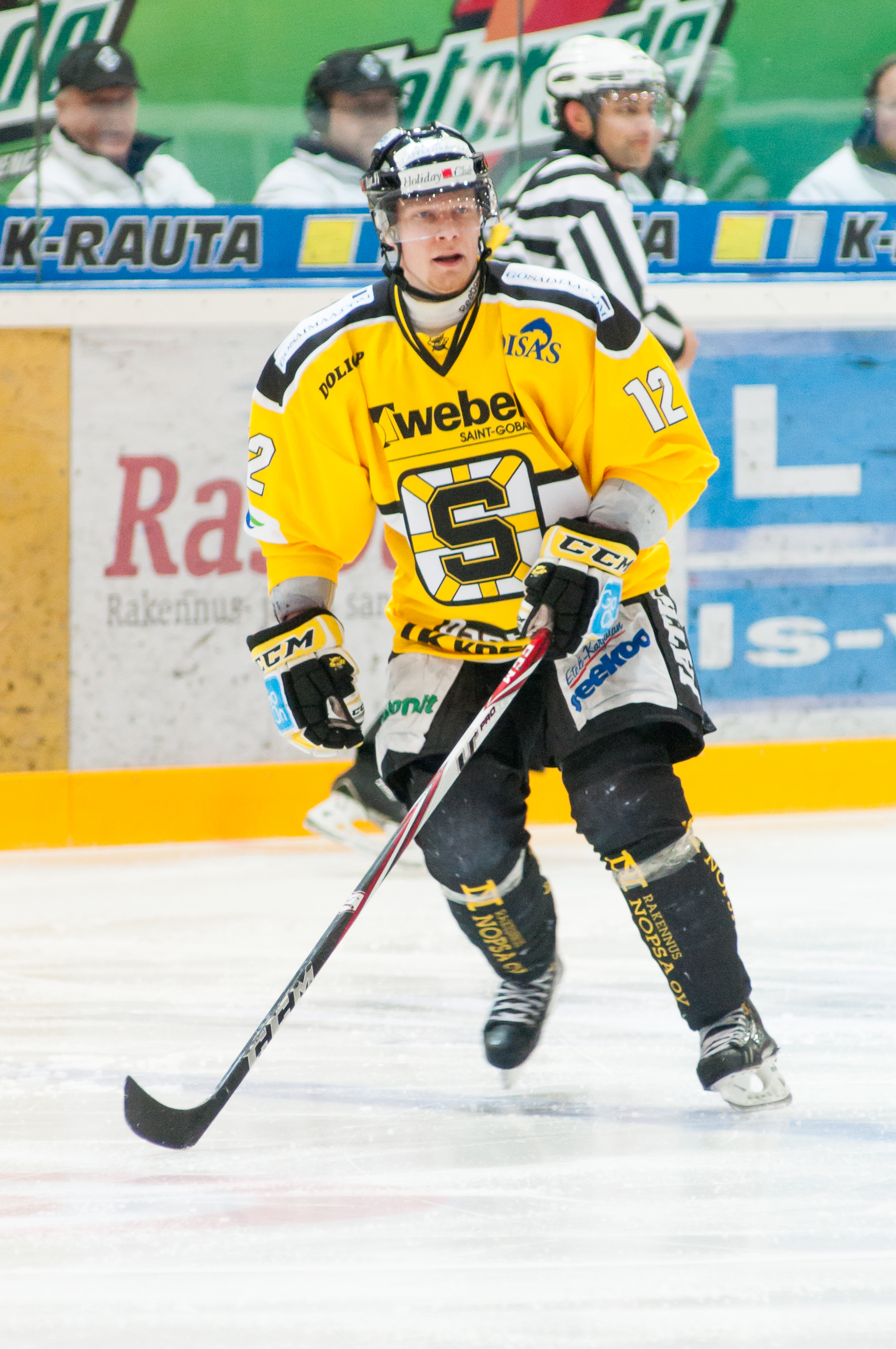
- Ice hockey forward Juha Koivisto of SaiPa Lappeenranta playing against Oulun Kärpät in Lappeenranta, Finland.
- Born: 4 May 1984 (age 40); Vantaa, Finland
- Height: 5 ft 10 in (178 cm)
- Weight: 180 lb (82 kg; 12 st 12 lb)
- Position: Forward
- Shoots: Right
- Liiga team Former teams: HPK; SaiPa; HPK; Sheffield Steelers; Oulun Kärpät
- NHL draft: Undrafted
- Playing career: 2003–present

Juha Koivisto (born 4 May 1984) is a Finnish professional ice hockey player. He is currently playing for Dragons de Rouen of the French Ligue Magnus.

Koivisto made his Liiga debut playing with SaiPa during the 2010–11 SM-liiga season.
