= Oskari Manninen =

Finnish ice hockey player (born 1991)

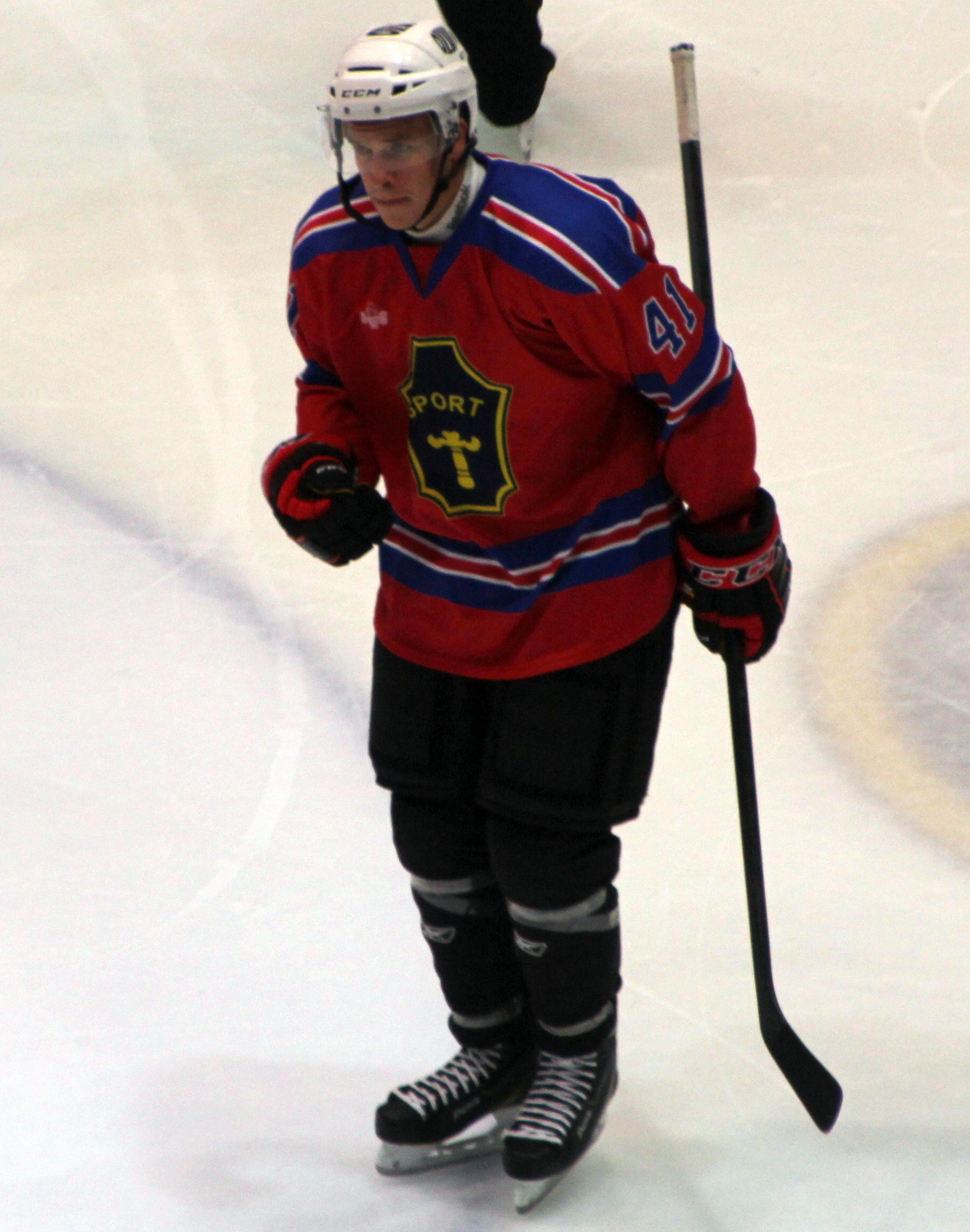
- Born: April 22, 1991 (age 35) Helsinki, Finland
- Height: 5 ft 11 in (180 cm)
- Weight: 187 lb (85 kg; 13 st 5 lb)
- Position: Defense
- Shoots: Left
- Mestis team Former teams: Jokerit; Sport; HPK; KooKoo; Tappara; HIFK
- Playing career: 2012–present

Oskari Manninen (born April 22, 1991) is a Finnish professional ice hockey player who is currently playing for Jokerit in the Mestis. He has previously played in the top flight Liiga with Jokerit, Sport, HPK, KooKoo, Tappara and HIFK.

Manninen made his Liiga debut playing with Jokerit during the 2013–14 Liiga season and following 12 seasons in the Liiga, he returned to Jokerit of the second tier Mestis, on an optional three-year contract on 14 May 2025.
