= Martin Berger (ice hockey) =

Finnish ice hockey defenceman

- Born: 10 December 1996 (age 28); Turku, Finland
- Height: 6 ft 0 in (183 cm)
- Weight: 181 lb (82 kg; 12 st 13 lb)
- Position: Defence
- Shot: Left
- Liiga team Former teams: KooKoo; HC TPS
- NHL draft: Undrafted
- Playing career: 2014–2021

Martin Berger (born 10 December 1996) is a Finnish former ice hockey defenceman. He is known for his physical style of play.

== Playing career ==
Berger made his Liiga debut playing with HC TPS during the 2014–15 Liiga season.

Due to heart complications, Berger retired at the age of 24.

== Career statistics ==
=== Regular season and playoffs ===
			Regular season					Playoffs
Season	Team	League	GP	G	A	Pts	PIM	GP	G	A	Pts	PIM
2015–2016	TPS	SM-liiga	3	0	0	0	0	1	0	0	0	0
2016–2017	TuTo	Mestis	5	1	1	2	2	–	–	–	–	–
2016–2017	TPS	SM-liiga	51	2	2	4	39	6	0	1	1	2
2017–2018	Sport	SM-liiga	3	0	0	0	0	–	–	–	–	–
	KooKoo	SM-liiga	3	0	0	0	2	–	–	–	–	–
	TPS	SM-liiga	42	2	6	8	24	6	0	1	1	0
2018–2019	KooKoo	SM-liiga	19	0	4	4	54	–	–	–	–	–
2019–2020	KooKoo	SM-liiga	46	2	4	6	183	–	–	–	–	–
6 seasons	totals	SM-liiga	172	6	16	22	300	13	0	2	2	2
