= Tommi Jokinen =

Finnish ice hockey player

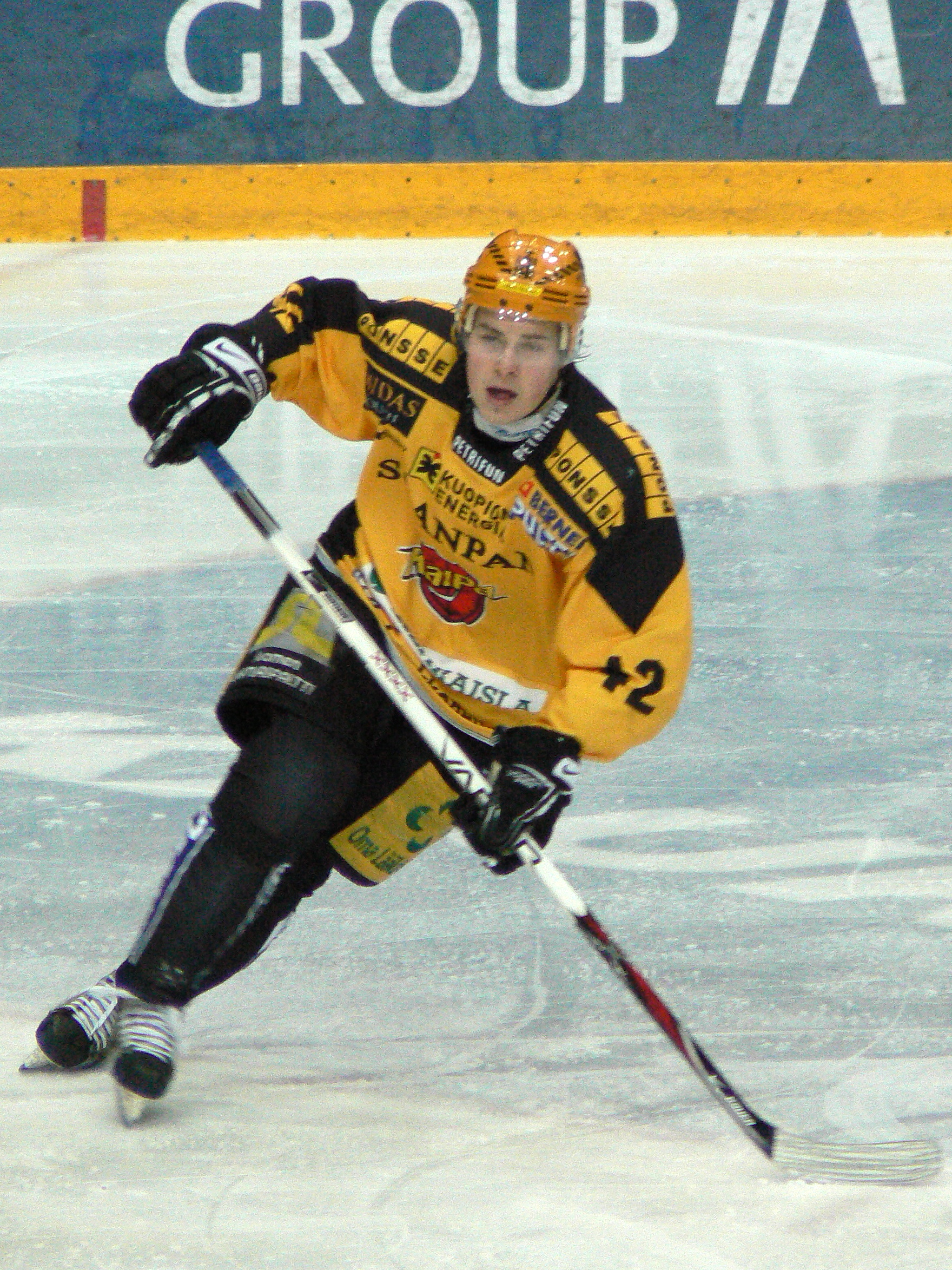
- Born: September 17, 1988 (age 36); Siilinjärvi, Finland
- Height: 6 ft 0 in (183 cm)
- Weight: 174 lb (79 kg; 12 st 6 lb)
- Position: Forward
- Shoots: Left
- EIHL team Former teams: Fife Flyers; KalPa; SaiPa; HC 21 Prešov; Nottingham Panthers
- Playing career: 2006–present

Tommi Jokinen is a Finnish professional ice hockey player currently attached to UK Elite Ice Hockey League (EIHL) side Fife Flyers. He previously played for HC 21 Prešov of the Slovak Extraliga.

Jokinen also previously played for KalPa and SaiPa of the Liiga.

== Career statistics ==
=== Regular season and playoffs ===
			Regular season					Playoffs
Season	Team	League	GP	G	A	Pts	PIM	GP	G	A	Pts	PIM
