= Jasper Lindsten =

Finnish ice hockey player

- Born: June 30, 1994 (age 31) Salo, Finland
- Height: 5 ft 10 in (178 cm)
- Weight: 159 lb (72 kg; 11 st 5 lb)
- Position: Forward
- Shoots: Left
- Liiga team Former teams: Porin Ässät; HC TPS; Espoo Blues; Oulun Kärpät
- Playing career: 2012–present

Jasper Lindsten (born June 30, 1994) is a Finnish ice hockey player. His is currently playing with Porin Ässät in the Finnish Liiga.

Lindsten made his SM-liiga debut playing with HC TPS during the 2020–2013.
