= Janne Keränen =

Finnish ice hockey player

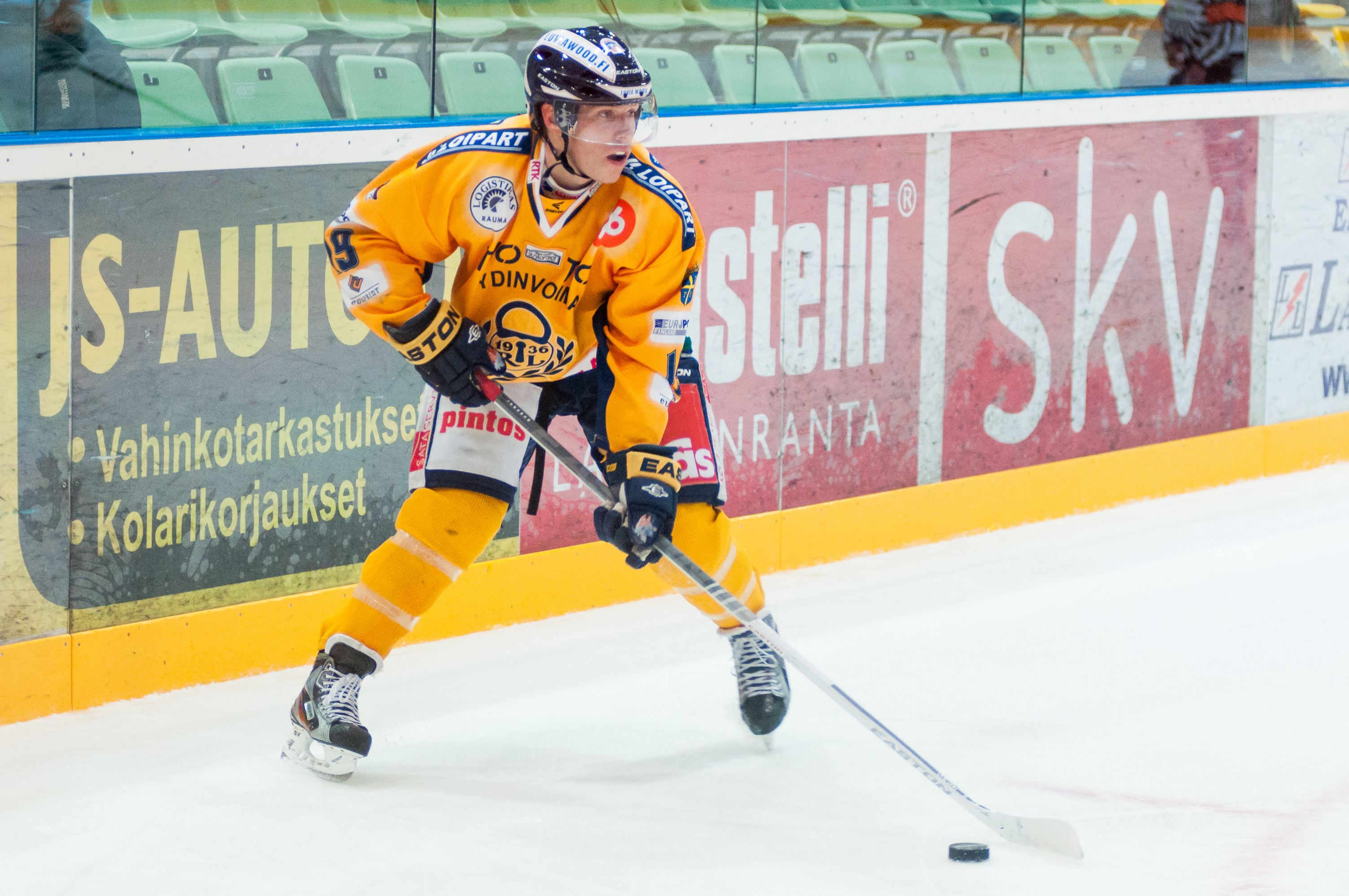
- Born: 30 June 1987 (age 37); Nurmijärvi, Finland
- Height: 5 ft 10 in (178 cm)
- Weight: 196 lb (89 kg; 14 st 0 lb)
- Position: Forward
- Shoots: Left
- Liiga team Former teams: Vaasan Sport; HIFK; Lukko; KalPa; HK Dukla Michalovce
- Playing career: 2006–present

Janne Keränen (born 30 June 1987) is a Finnish ice hockey player who currently playing for Vaasan Sport of the Liiga.

== Career statistics ==
=== Regular season and playoffs ===
			Regular season					Playoffs
Season	Team	League	GP	G	A	Pts	PIM	GP	G	A	Pts	PIM
2004–05	HIFK	Jr. A	2	0	1	1	0	—	—	—	—	—
2005–06	HIFK	Jr. A	21	11	15	26	2	—	—	—	—	—
2006–07	HIFK	Jr. A	22	10	18	28	0	2	2	1	3	0
2006–07	Suomi U20	Mestis	2	0	0	0	0	—	—	—	—	—
2007–08	HIFK	SM-liiga	54	1	7	8	2	7	0	0	0	2
2008–09	HIFK	Jr. A	3	3	1	4	0	—	—	—	—	—
2008–09	HIFK	SM-liiga	43	3	0	3	10	—	—	—	—	—
2009–10	Lukko	SM-liiga	57	11	18	29	43	4	2	0	2	4
2010–11	Lukko	SM-liiga	37	6	9	15	10	13	1	5	6	2
2011–12	Lukko	SM-liiga	60	11	18	29	12	3	0	1	1	0
2012–13	Lukko	SM-liiga	50	13	11	24	2	13	2	2	4	0
2013–14	Lukko	Liiga	60	12	11	23	8	15	1	3	4	0
2014–15	KalPa	Liiga	57	18	9	27	10	6	1	0	1	2
2015–16	KalPa	Liiga	56	18	15	33	14	3	1	1	2	2
2016–17	KalPa	Liiga	60	24	18	42	8	18	6	6	12	4
2017–18	Lukko	Liiga	60	17	14	31	24	2	1	0	1	2
2018–19	Lukko	Liiga	59	19	18	37	28	7	3	2	5	0
2019–20	KalPa	Liiga	54	19	16	35	16	—	—	—	—	—
2020–21	Vaasan Sport	Liiga	45	13	7	20	6	2	2	1	3	0
2021–22	HK Dukla Michalovce	Slovak	47	14	16	30	14	4	0	0	0	0
Liiga totals			773	189	173	362	195	98	21	21	42	18
