= Timi Lahtinen =

Finnish ice hockey winger

- Born: January 6, 1995 (age 31) Helsinki, Finland
- Height: 6 ft 3 in (191 cm)
- Weight: 205 lb (93 kg; 14 st 9 lb)
- Position: Winger
- Shoots: Left
- Polska Hokej Liga team Former teams: STS Sanok; Blues; TPS; IPK; Kiekko-Espoo; HK Spišská Nová Ves; Dundee Stars
- Playing career: 2014–present

Timi Lahtinen (born January 6, 1995) is a Finnish professional ice hockey winger currently playing for Polska Hokej Liga side STS Sanok.

Lahtinen made his Liiga debut for Blues during the 2014–15 season and played 71 games for Blues over two seasons. The team though ceased operations after the 2015–16 Liiga season and Lahtinen was forced to find a new team, eventually joining TPS on May 21, 2016.

Lahtinen struggled to work his way into TPS' squad, playing just 27 games for the team before being sent to TUTO Hockey on loan and eventually joined TUTO permanently on May 11, 2018. On July 11, 2019, Lahtinen signed for IPK.

After a further spell in Finland with Kiekko-Espoo, Lahtinen agreed to his first contract outside Finland when he joined Slovak 1. Liga side HK Spišská Nová Ves in February 2021.

In July 2021, Lahtinen then agreed to join Scottish EIHL side Dundee Stars for the 2021–22 season.

In July 2022, Lahtinen signed terms with Polish side STS Sanok for the 2022–23 season.
