= Antti Lehtonen =

Finnish ice hockey player

- Born: August 6, 1993 (age 31); Jyväskylä, Finland
- Height: 6 ft 0 in (183 cm)
- Weight: 176 lb (80 kg; 12 st 8 lb)
- Position: Goaltender
- Catches: Left
- team Former teams: Free agent Oulun Kärpät; Ilves
- NHL draft: Undrafted
- Playing career: 2011–present

Antti Lehtonen, (born August 6, 1993) is a Finnish professional ice hockey goaltender. He is currently a free agent having last played for Ilves of the Finnish Liiga.

Lehtonen made his Liiga debut playing with Oulun Kärpät during the 2015–16 Liiga season.
