= Juho Liuksiala =

Finnish ice hockey player

- Born: 2 November 1995 (age 29); Vammala, Finland
- Height: 5 ft 7 in (170 cm)
- Weight: 170 lb (77 kg; 12 st 2 lb)
- Position: Forward
- Shoots: Right
- Liiga team Former teams: Sport; Ilves
- NHL draft: Undrafted
- Playing career: 2015–present

Juho Liuksiala (born 2 November 1995) is a Finnish professional ice hockey player. He is currently playing for Sport of the Finnish Liiga.

Liuksiala made his Liiga debut playing with Ilves during the 2014–15 Liiga season.
