= Mikael Seppälä =

Finnish ice hockey player

- Born: March 8, 1994 (age 32) Ylivieska, Finland
- Height: 6 ft 2 in (188 cm)
- Weight: 201 lb (91 kg; 14 st 5 lb)
- Position: Defence
- Shoots: Left
- ELH team Former teams: HC Sparta Praha; KalPa; Tappara; HV71
- National team: Finland
- Playing career: 2013–present

Mikael Seppälä (born March 8, 1994) is a Finnish professional ice hockey player who is a defenceman for HC Sparta Praha of the Czech Extraliga (ELH).

== Playing career ==
Seppälä made his Liiga debut playing with KalPa during the 2013–14 Liiga season.

In 2015 he was playing for and was the captain of Hokki of the Finnish Mestis. Seppälä transferred back to KalPa in the end of 2016, leaving the captain position in Hokki in the middle of the season. He signed a contract extension with KalPa in 2019.

After two years in Jönköping with HV71 of the Swedish Hockey League, having helped the club avoid relegation to the Allsvenskan in a play-out series in both campaigns, Seppälä left HV71 at the conclusion of the 2024–25 season.

On 1 July 2025, Seppälä was signed to a one-year contract to join Czech based HC Sparta Praha of the ELH.

== Career statistics ==
Medal record

Representing Finland

Ice hockey

World Championships
Gold medal – first place	2022 Finland	
Gold medal – first place	2026 Switzerland	
Silver medal – second place	2021 Latvia	

=== International ===
Year	Team	Event	Result	GP	G	A	Pts	PIM
2021	Finland	WC	2nd place, silver medalist(s)	4	0	0	0	0
2022	Finland	WC	1st place, gold medalist(s)	8	0	1	1	2
2023	Finland	WC	7th	8	0	3	3	2
2025	Finland	WC	7th	8	0	1	1	2
2026	Finland	WC	1st place, gold medalist(s)	3	0	0	0	0
Senior totals				31	0	5	5	6

== Awards and honours ==
Award	Year
Liiga
Champion (Tappara)	2022
