= Teemu Rautiainen =

Finnish ice hockey player

- Born: March 13, 1992 (age 33); Nurmijärvi, Finland
- Height: 5 ft 7 in (170 cm)
- Weight: 154 lb (70 kg; 11 st 0 lb)
- Position: Forward
- Shoots: Left
- SL team Former teams: GCK Lions; Ilves
- Playing career: 2011–present

Teemu Rautiainen
Medal record

Representing Finland

Ice hockey

IIHF World U18 Championships
Bronze medal – third place	2010 Belarus	

Teemu Rautiainen (born March 13, 1992) is a Finnish professional ice hockey player who currently plays with the GCK Lions of the Swiss League (SL). He previously played with Ilves of the Finnish Liiga.

Rautiainen played with HPK in the SM-liiga during the 2010–11 season.
