= Kimi Koivisto =

Finnish ice hockey player

- Born: December 31, 1992 (age 32); Heinola, Finland
- Height: 5 ft 11 in (180 cm)
- Weight: 181 lb (82 kg; 12 st 13 lb)
- Position: Forward
- Shoots: Left
- Liiga team Former teams: KooKoo; Lahti Pelicans
- NHL draft: Undrafted
- Playing career: 2012–present

Kimi Koivisto (born December 31, 1992) is a Finnish ice hockey player. His is currently playing with KooKoo in the Finnish Liiga.

Koivisto made his Liiga debut playing with Lahti Pelicans during the 2011–12 SM-liiga season.
