= Mikko Kuukka =

Finnish ice hockey player

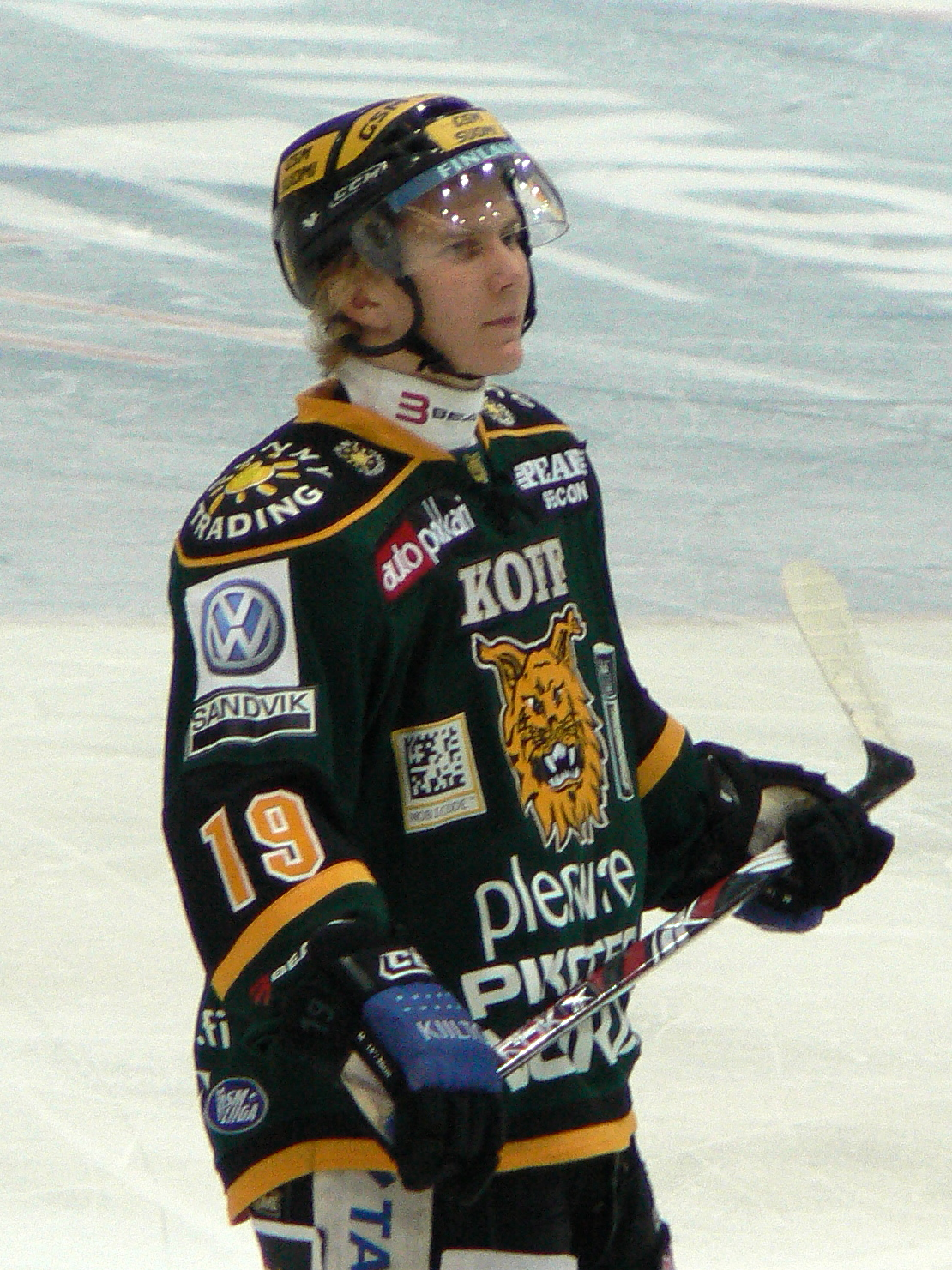
- Born: November 3, 1985 (age 39); Hämeenkyrö, Finland
- Height: 6 ft 3 in (191 cm)
- Weight: 207 lb (94 kg; 14 st 11 lb)
- Position: Defence
- Shoots: Left
- Mestis team Former teams: Kiekko-Espoo; Ilves; Lukko Rauma; Espoo Blues; JYP Jyväskylä; Sheffield Steelers; Jukurit
- NHL draft: Undrafted
- Playing career: 2005–present

Mikko Kuukka (born November 3, 1985) is a Finnish professional ice hockey defenceman who most recently played for Finnish Mestis side Kiekko-Espoo. Prior to that, Kuukka played with Jukurit and UK EIHL side Sheffield Steelers. Kuukka previously played in his native Finland for the Espoo Blues in the Liiga. Undrafted, Kuuka played two years of major junior North American hockey with the Red Deer Rebels of the Western Hockey League.
