= Oskari Setänen =

Finnish ice hockey player

- Born: April 28, 1994 (age 31) Eura, Finland
- Height: 6 ft 0 in (183 cm)
- Weight: 176 lb (80 kg; 12 st 8 lb)
- Position: Goaltender
- Catches: Left
- Liiga team Former teams: JYP Jyväskylä; Lukko; Jukurit; KeuPa HT; TUTO Hockey; Rovaniemen Kiekko; Ässät; Savonlinnan Pallokerho; HC TPS; Rauman Lukko; KooKoo; Dragons de Rouen
- Playing career: 2013–present

Oskari Setänen (born April 28, 1994) is a Finnish professional ice hockey goaltender. He is currently playing for JYP in Liiga.

Setänen made his Liiga debut playing with Lukko during the 2013–14 Liiga season.
