= Santeri Lukka =

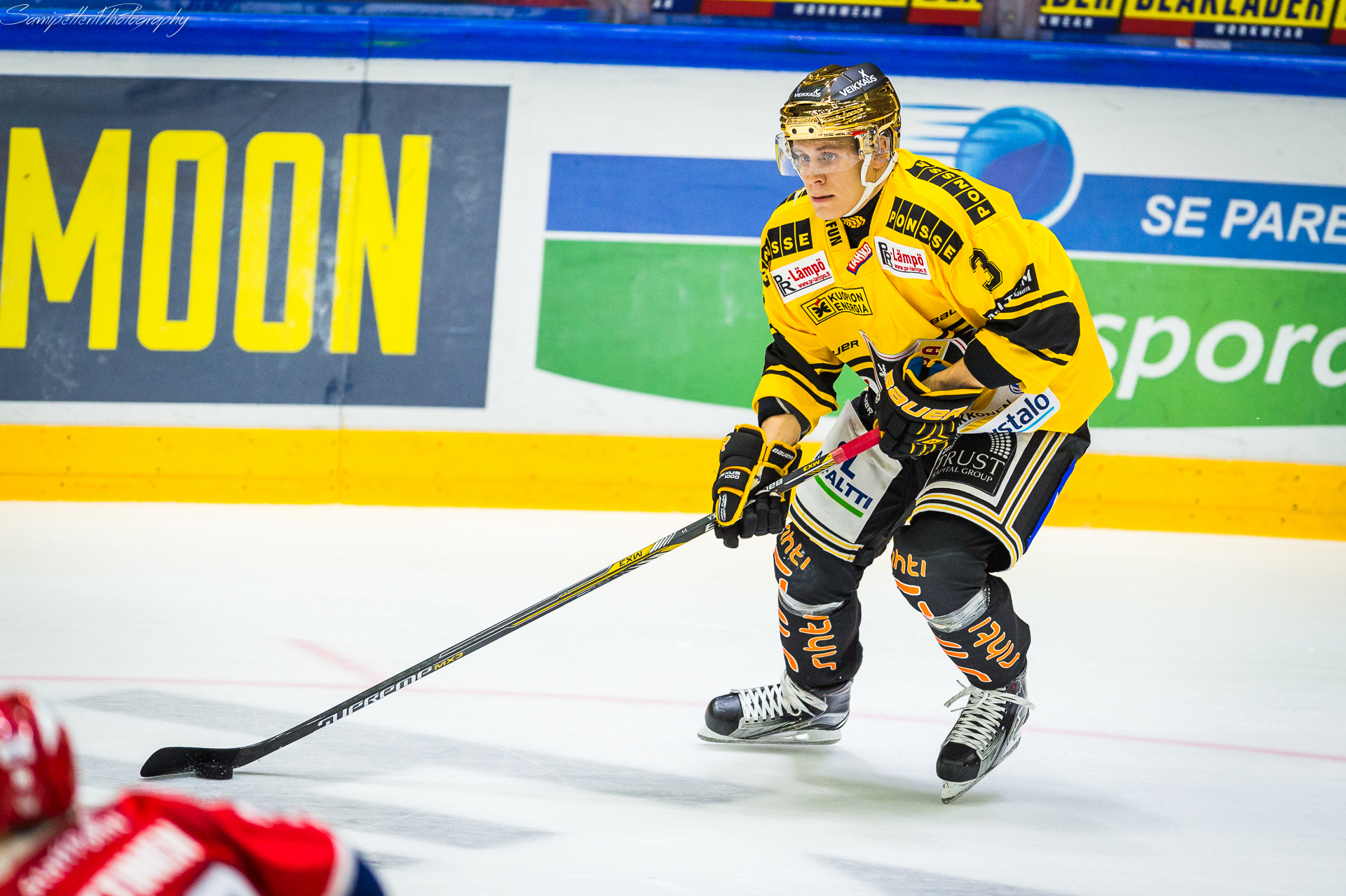
- Santeri Lukka playing for KalPa in 2016
- Born: 19 July 1991 (age 34) Pori, Finland
- Height: 180 cm (5 ft 11 in)
- Weight: 86 kg (190 lb; 13 st 8 lb)
- Position: Defenceman
- Shot: Right
- Played for: KalPa; TPS; HPK; Ässät
- Current U20 SM-sarja coach: Porin Ässät U20, U19, U18, U17, U16
- Playing career: 2014–2022
- Coaching career: 2022–present

Santeri Lukka (born 19 July 1991) is a Finnish former professional ice hockey player. He now coaches defencemen in Ässät's junior teams.
