= Miska Humaloja =

Finnish ice hockey player

- Born: 15 May 1991 (age 34) Pyhäjärvi, Finland
- Height: 182 cm (6 ft 0 in)
- Weight: 90 kg (198 lb; 14 st 2 lb)
- Position: Forward
- Shoots: Left
- III-divisioona team Former teams: PyPo; Oulun Kärpät; KalPa
- Playing career: 2012–present

Miska Humaloja (born 15 May 1991) is a Finnish ice hockey forward currently playing for PyPo of the Finnish III-divisioona.
