= Matias Myttynen =

Finnish ice hockey player

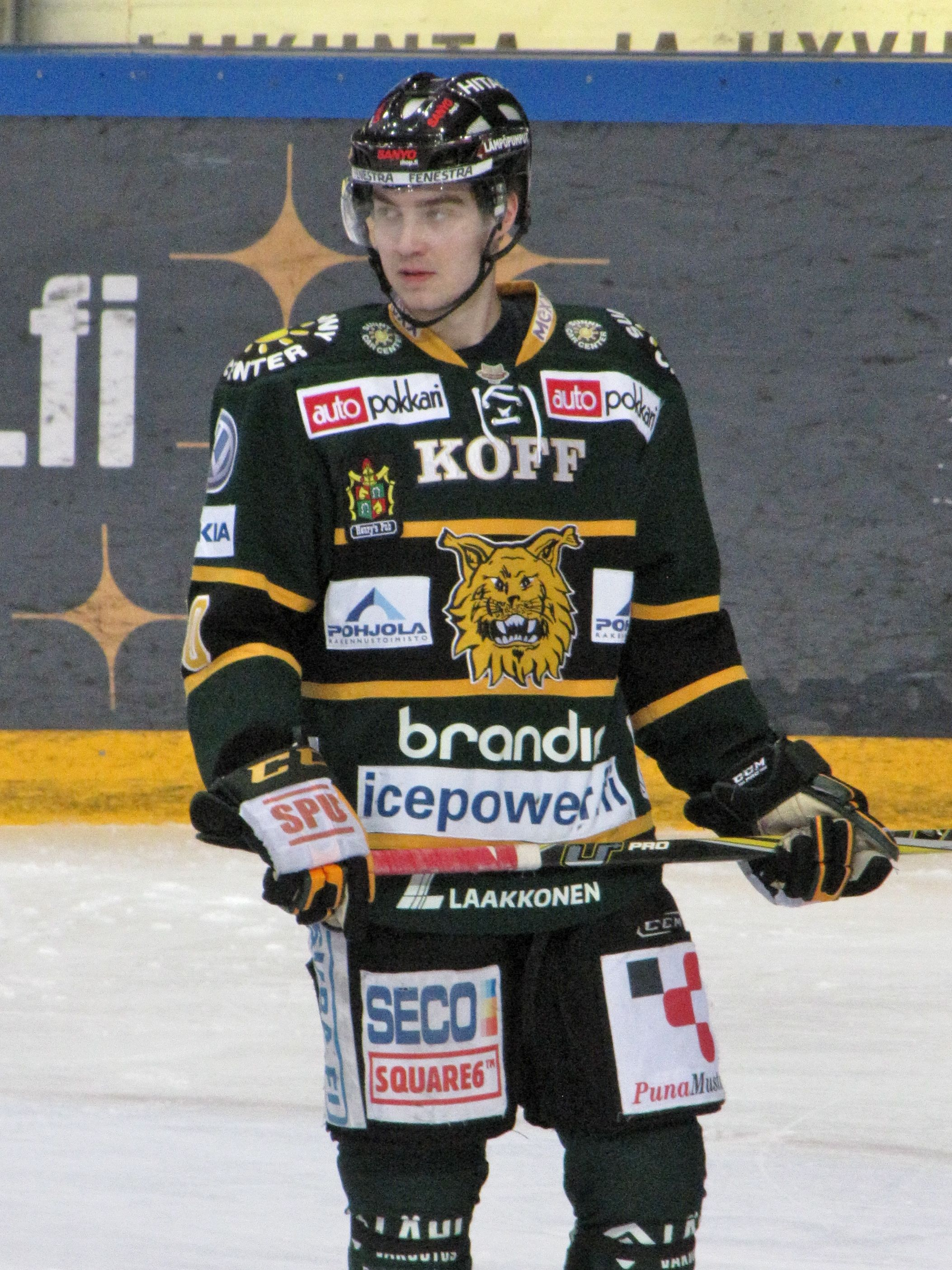
- Born: 12 March 1990 (age 35); Tampere, Finland
- Height: 6 ft 2 in (188 cm)
- Weight: 203 lb (92 kg; 14 st 7 lb)
- Position: Center
- Shoots: Left
- KHL team Former teams: Jokerit; Ilves; JYP Jyväskylä; VIK Västerås HK; KalPa; Kunlun Red Star; HC Vityaz; Dinamo Riga
- Playing career: 2009–present

Matias Myttynen (born 12 March 1990) is a Finnish professional ice hockey forward. He is currently playing for Jokerit of the Kontinental Hockey League (KHL).

Myttynen made his SM-liiga debut playing with Ilves during the 2009–10 SM-liiga season before later playing with JYP Jyväskylä and KalPa in the Liiga.
