= Santeri Vuoti =

Finnish ice hockey player

- Born: 1 February 1995 (age 30); Hyvinkää, Finland
- Height: 5 ft 9 in (175 cm)
- Weight: 168 lb (76 kg; 12 st 0 lb)
- Position: Forward
- Shoots: Left
- Mestis team Former teams: Lempäälän Kisa; HPK; Ilves; SaiPa
- NHL draft: Undrafted
- Playing career: 2014–present

Santeri Vuoti (born 1 February 1995) is a Finnish ice hockey player. He is currently playing with Lempäälän Kisa in the Finnish Mestis.

Vuoti made his Liiga debut playing with HPK during the 2014–15 Liiga season.
