= 2015–16 Liiga season =

2015–16 SM-liiga
- League: SM-liiga
- Sport: Ice hockey
- Duration: September 2015 – April 2016
- Teams: 15
- TV partner(s): UrhoTV, Nelonen

Regular season
- Best record: HIFK
- Runners-up: Oulun Kärpät
- Season MVP: Kristian Kuusela
- Top scorer: Kristian Kuusela

Playoffs
- Playoffs MVP: Patrik Laine
- Finals champions: Tappara
- Runners-up: HIFK

SM-liiga seasons
- ← 2014–15 2016–17 →

The 2015–16 SM-liiga season was the 41st season of the SM-liiga, the top level of ice hockey in Finland, since the league's formation in 1975.

== Teams ==
Location of teams in 2015–2016 SM-liiga

| Team | City | Head coach | Arena | Capacity | Captain |
|---|---|---|---|---|---|
| Blues | Espoo | Jyrki Aho | Barona Areena | 7,017 | Jari Sailio |
| HIFK | Helsinki | Antti Törmänen | Helsingin jäähalli | 8,200 | Arttu Luttinen |
| HPK | Hämeenlinna | Pasi Arvonen | Patria-areena | 5,360 | Riku Hahl |
| Ilves | Tampere | Tuomas Toukkola | Tampereen jäähalli | 7,300 | Sami Sandell |
| JYP | Jyväskylä | Marko Virtanen | Synergia-areena | 4,437 | Tuomas Pihlman |
| KalPa | Kuopio | Pekka Virta | Niiralan monttu | 5,064 | Mikko Jokela |
| KooKoo | Kouvola | Petri Mattila | Lumon arena | 6,000 | Ari Vallin |
| Kärpät | Oulu | Lauri Marjamäki | Oulun Energia Areena | 6,780 | Lasse Kukkonen |
| Lukko | Rauma | Risto Dufva | Äijänsuo Arena | 5,400 | Ilkka Mikkola |
| Pelicans | Lahti | Petri Matikainen | Isku Areena | 5,530 | Antti Erkinjuntti |
| SaiPa | Lappeenranta | Pekka Tirkkonen | Kisapuisto | 4,820 | Ville Koho |
| Sport | Vaasa | Tomek Valtonen | Vaasa Arena | 4,512 | Mikko Pukka |
| Tappara | Tampere | Jussi Tapola | Tampereen jäähalli | 7,300 | Jukka Peltola |
| TPS | Turku | Ari-Pekka Selin | HK Arena | 11,820 | Tomi Kallio |
| Ässät | Pori | Pekka Rautakallio | Porin jäähalli | 6,097 | Juha Kiilholma |

== Regular season ==
Top six advanced straight to quarter-finals, while teams between 7th and 10th positions played wild card round for the final two spots. The SM-liiga is a closed series and thus there is no relegation.

| Pos | Team | Pld | W | OTW | OTL | L | GF | GA | GD | Pts | Final Result |
|---|---|---|---|---|---|---|---|---|---|---|---|
| 1 | HIFK | 60 | 37 | 6 | 4 | 13 | 186 | 131 | +55 | 127 | Advance to Quarterfinals |
| 2 | Kärpät | 60 | 33 | 6 | 8 | 13 | 178 | 126 | +52 | 119 | Advance to Quarterfinals |
| 3 | Tappara | 60 | 26 | 12 | 8 | 14 | 177 | 136 | +41 | 110 | Advance to Quarterfinals |
| 4 | JYP | 60 | 29 | 7 | 5 | 19 | 156 | 139 | +17 | 106 | Advance to Quarterfinals |
| 5 | SaiPa | 60 | 27 | 5 | 8 | 20 | 178 | 146 | +32 | 99 | Advance to Quarterfinals |
| 6 | Lukko | 60 | 24 | 9 | 4 | 23 | 154 | 132 | +22 | 94 | Advance to Quarterfinals |
| 7 | TPS | 60 | 23 | 6 | 9 | 22 | 150 | 152 | −2 | 90 | Advance to Wild-card round |
| 8 | KalPa | 60 | 21 | 10 | 7 | 22 | 129 | 127 | +2 | 90 | Advance to Wild-card round |
| 9 | Pelicans | 60 | 24 | 4 | 7 | 25 | 145 | 171 | −26 | 87 | Advance to Wild-card round |
| 10 | Sport | 60 | 20 | 7 | 9 | 24 | 153 | 156 | −3 | 83 | Advance to Wild-card round |
| 11 | KooKoo | 60 | 16 | 10 | 10 | 24 | 129 | 159 | −30 | 78 | |
| 12 | Ässät | 60 | 20 | 5 | 7 | 28 | 143 | 162 | −19 | 77 | |
| 13 | HPK | 60 | 18 | 5 | 4 | 33 | 125 | 168 | −43 | 68 | |
| 14 | Ilves | 60 | 16 | 5 | 5 | 34 | 124 | 163 | −39 | 63 | |
| 15 | Blues | 60 | 13 | 6 | 8 | 33 | 108 | 168 | −60 | 59 | |

Source: Liiga

Rules for classification: 1) Points; 2) 3-point wins 3) Goal difference; 4) Goals scored; 4) Head-to-head points.

== Playoffs ==
=== Bracket ===
Wild-card round (best-of-3)
7 | TPS | 2
10 | Sport | 0
8 | KalPa | 1
9 | Pelicans | 2

Quarter-finals (best-of-7)
1 | HIFK | 4
9 | Pelicans | 2
2 | Kärpät | 4
7 | TPS | 2
3 | Tappara | 4
6 | Lukko | 1
4 | JYP | 4
5 | SaiPa | 2

Semi-finals (best-of-7)
1 | HIFK | 4
4 | JYP | 2
(Pairings are re-seeded after the first and second round)
2 | Kärpät | 3
3 | Tappara | 4

Finals (best-of-7)
1 | HIFK | 2
3 | Tappara | 4
Bronze medal game
2 | Kärpät | 1
4 | JYP | 0

=== Wild card round (best-of-three) ===
==== (7) TPS vs. (10) Sport ====
| 12 March 2016; 17:00 | TPS | 4–2 (2–2, 1–0, 1–0) | Sport | HK Arena, Turku; Attendance: 4,461 |

Game reference

Teemu Lassila
Goalies
Mika Järvinen
Referees:
Timo Metsälä
Teemu Salminen
Linesmen:
Jani Pesonen
Timo Riikonen

| I. Pikkarainen (V-V Vainiola) (SH, DP) – 03:36 | 1–0 |
| | 1–1 | 13:04 – C. Bertrand (J. Newton, S. Blomqvist) (DP) |
| T. Kallio (P. Nummelin, J. Ahtola) (PP1) – 14:52 | 2–1 |
| | 2–2 | 16:56 – T. Tallberg (SH) |
| J. Forsström (P. Nummelin, T. Kallio) (PP1) – 32:20 | 3–2 |
| I. Pikkarainen (EN) – 58:42 | 4–2 |

10 min
Penalties
56 min
36
Shots
21

| 13 March 2016; 17:00 | Sport | 2–5 (1–2, 1–2, 0–1) | TPS | Vaasa Arena, Vaasa; Attendance: 4,093 |

Game reference

Mika Järvinen
Goalies
Teemu Lassila
Referees:
Timo Favorin
Jari-Pekka Pajula
Linesmen:
Henri Neva
Hannu Sormunen

| T. Koskiranta (C. Bertrand, T. Da Costa) – 03:41 | 1–0 |
| | 1–1 | 07:25 – H. Tallinder (O. Nieminen, V-V Vainiola) |
| | 1–2 | 14:40 – H. Tikkanen (T. Kallio, J. Ahtola) |
| | 1–3 | 28:49 – J. Ahtola (T. Kallio, É. Perrin) |
| T. Da Costa (E. Riska) – 29:50 | 2–3 |
| | 2–4 | 33:41 – É. Perrin (T. Kallio) |
| | 2–5 | 59:13 – J. Makkonen (I. Pikkarainen, J. Forsström) (EN) |

4 min
Penalties
8 min
32
Shots
26

TPS wins the series 2–0.

==== (8) KalPa vs. (9) Pelicans ====
| 12 March 2016; 17:00 | KalPa | 3–2 1OT (2–0, 0–1, 0–1, 1–0) | Pelicans | Niiralan monttu, Kuopio; Attendance: 3,021 |

Game reference

Eero Kilpeläinen
Goalies
Janne Juvonen
Referees:
Mikko Kaukokari
Tom Laaksonen
Linesmen:
Joonas Saha
Daniel Österholm

| J. Nikko (M. Ruohomaa) (PP1) – 12:11 | 1–0 |
| J. Keränen (N. Mikkola, J. Mankinen) – 16:19 | 2–0 |
| | 2–1 | 25:14 – J. Tyrväinen (V. Sopanen) |
| | 2–2 | 59:34 – V. Sopanen (J. Tyrväinen, S. Repo) |
| S. Lauritzen (J. Nikko, J. Riikola) (PP) – 65:01 | 3–2 |

2 min
Penalties
28 min
33
Shots
23

| 13 March 2016; 17:00 | Pelicans | 4–1 (2–0, 0–0, 2–1) | KalPa | Isku Areena, Lahti; Attendance: 2,854 |

Game reference

Janne Juvonen
Goalies
Eero Kilpeläinen
Referees:
Jari Levonen
Anssi Salonen
Linesmen:
Pasi Nieminen
Sakari Suominen

| J. Leimu (A. Erkinjuntti, V. Sopanen) (PP) – 16:45 | 1–0 |
| J. Leimu (H. Björninen) (PP) – 18:01 | 2–0 |
| S. Lassen (PP1) – 44:47 | 3–0 |
| N. Manelius (A. Erkinjuntti, J. Juvonen) (SH, EN) – 58:21 | 4–0 |
| | 4–1 | 58:44 – S. Lauritzen (J. Keränen, M. Ruohomaa) (PP1) |

6 min
Penalties
16 min
32
Shots
17

| 15 March 2016; 18:30 | KalPa | 1–2 (1–0, 0–2, 0–0) | Pelicans | Niiralan monttu, Kuopio; Attendance: 3,010 |

Game reference

Eero Kilpeläinen
Goalies
Janne Juvonen
Referees:
Stefan Fonselius
Jouni Saukkonen
Linesmen:
Pasi Nieminen
Sakari Suominen

| M. Ruohomaa (SH) – 19:05 | 1–0 |
| | 1–1 | 27:30 – J. Leimu (V. Sopanen) (PP1) |
| | 1–2 | 38:47 – R. Potulny (S. Repo, J-P Pietilä) |

6 min
Penalties
6 min
31
Shots
20

Pelicans wins the series 2–1.

=== Quarterfinals (best-of-seven) ===
==== (1) HIFK vs. (9) Pelicans ====
| 18 March 2016; 18:30 | HIFK | 5–1 (1–0, 3–1, 1–0) | Pelicans | Helsinki Ice Hall, Helsinki; Attendance: 7,512 |

Game reference

Ville Husso
Goalies
Janne Juvonen
Referees:
Timo Favorin
Jari Suorsa
Linesmen:
Pasi Nieminen
Tommi Niittylä

| T. Taimi (J. Rask, T. Záborský) – 11:05 | 1–0 |
| J. Ikonen (J. Puustinen, Y. Auvitu) (PP1) – 20:35 | 2–0 |
| | 2–1 | 22:55 – A. Erkinjuntti |
| C. Elkins (J. Järvinen, M. Partanen) – 24:11 | 3–1 |
| A. Luttinen (R. Hintz, M. Partanen) – 38:06 | 4–1 |
| T. Ramstedt (R. Leino, T. Taimi) – 59:08 | 5–1 |

2 min
Penalties
18 min
26
Shots
27

| 19 March 2016; 17:00 | Pelicans | 0–3 (0–2, 0–1, 0–0) | HIFK | Isku Areena, Lahti; Attendance: 4,707 |

Game reference

Janne Juvonen
Goalies
Ville Husso
Referees:
Stefan Fonselius
Jari Levonen
Linesmen:
Henri Neva
Hannu Sormunen

| 0–1 | 08:43 – A. Luttinen (R. Leino, R. Hintz) (PP1) |
| 0–2 | 15:32 – T. Ramstedt (T. Záborský, J. Ikonen) (PP1) |
| 0–3 | 37:23 – J. Ikonen (J. Puustinen, Y. Auvitu) (PP1) |

8 min
Penalties
4 min
18
Shots
25

| 22 March 2016; 18:30 | HIFK | 2–4 (1–2, 0–1, 1–1) | Pelicans | Helsinki Ice Hall, Helsinki; Attendance: 7,281 |

Game reference

Ville Husso
Goalies
Niko Hovinen
Referees:
Jari Levonen
Anssi Salonen
Linesmen:
Lauri Nikulainen
Daniel Österholm

| J. Ikonen (C. Elkins, A. Luttinen) – 04:54 | 1–0 |
| | 1–1 | 10:52 – A. Erkinjuntti (J. Leimu) (PP1) |
| | 1–2 | 13:44 – R. Potulny (M. Roine, S. Lassen) |
| | 1–3 | 34:18 – J. Latvala (V. Sopanen, A. Erkinjuntti) |
| | 1–4 | 49:37 – A. Rekonen (M. Roine, R. Potulny) |
| J. Rask (A. Luttinen, T. Záborský) (PP1) – 53:08 | 2–4 |

2 min
Penalties
10 min
41
Shots
16

| 24 March 2016; 18:30 | Pelicans | 3–2 1OT (0–1, 1–1, 1–0, 1–0) | HIFK | Isku Areena, Lahti; Attendance: 4,513 |

Game reference

Niko Hovinen
Goalies
Kevin Lankinen
Referees:
Jari Levonen
Jari-Pekka Pajula
Linesmen:
Mauri Järvi
Tommi Niittylä

| | 0–1 | 04:23 – C. Elkins (L. Taipalus, M. Generous) |
| J. Hurri (H. Björninen, D. Byers) – 32:19 | 1–1 |
| | 1–2 | 36:26 – Y. Auvitu (J. Rask, T. Ramstedt) |
| A. Rekonen (R. Potulny) – 51:33 | 2–2 |
| J. Tyrväinen (A. Erkinjuntti, V. Sopanen) – 62:46 | 3–2 |

8 min
Penalties
4 min
21
Shots
22

| 26 March 2016; 17:00 | HIFK | 2–1 (1–0, 0–1, 1–0) | Pelicans | Helsinki Ice Hall, Helsinki; Attendance: 7,574 |

Game reference

Ville Husso
Goalies
Niko Hovinen
Referees:
Timo Favorin
Anssi Salonen
Linesmen:
Pasi Nieminen
Lauri Nikulainen

| T. Tuomisto (M. Partanen) – 12:21 | 1–0 |
| | 1–1 | 25:53 – J. Ritamäki (H. Björninen) |
| T. Ramstedt (J. Rask, T. Záborský) (PP1) – 52:06 | 2–1 |

6 min
Penalties
10 min
28
Shots
20

| 28 March 2016; 17:00 | Pelicans | 1–2 (0–0, 1–0, 0–2) | HIFK | Isku Areena, Lahti; Attendance: 5,121 |

Game reference

Niko Hovinen
Goalies
Ville Husso
Referees:
Stefan Fonselius
Jari Levonen
Linesmen:
Markus Hägerström
Sakari Suominen

| J. Tyrväinen (M. Pöyhönen, J. Leimu) – 32:36 | 1–0 |
| | 1–1 | 47:13 – T. Taimi (R. Hintz, J. Järvinen) |
| | 1–2 | 59:48 – J. Ikonen (C. Elkins, T. Ramstedt) |

6 min
Penalties
8 min
21
Shots
27

HIFK wins the series 4–2.

==== (2) Kärpät vs. (7) TPS ====
| 18 March 2016; 18:30 | Kärpät | 1–2 1OT (0–0, 0–1, 1–0, 0–1) | TPS | Oulun Energia Areena, Oulu; Attendance: 5,810 |

Game reference

Sami Rajaniemi
Goalies
Teemu Lassila
Referees:
Jussi Leppänen
Jouni Saukkonen
Linesmen:
Lasse Lappalainen
Harri Perämäki

| | 0–1 | 32:08 – F. Paré (J. Makkonen, E. Eronen) |
| M. Niemi (M. Pyörälä, A. Laatikainen) | 1–1 |
| | 1–2 | 61:13 – K. Kaijomaa (F. Paré, J. Makkonen) |

2 min
Penalties
8 min
33
Shots
27

| 19 March 2016; 17:00 | TPS | 1–6 (0–3, 0–1, 1–2) | Kärpät | HK Arena, Turku; Attendance: 8,726 |

Game reference

Teemu Lassila
Goalies
Sami Rajaniemi
Referees:
Jari-Pekka Pajula
Anssi Salonen
Linesmen:
Mauri Järvi
Sakari Suominen

| | 0–1 | 12:09 – E. Pirnes (S. Manninen, M. Aaltonen) (PP1) |
| | 0–2 | 14:55 – S. Aho (M. Nutivaara, S. Manninen) |
| | 0–3 | 18:51 – S. Mäenalanen (M. Nutivaara, J. Ikonen) (PP1) |
| | 0–4 | 20:38 – M. Pyörälä (L. Kukkonen, S. Aho) (PP1) |
| P. Nummelin (É. Perrin) (PP2) – 51:19 | 1–4 |
| | 1–5 | 54:54 – S. Aho (J. Ikonen, M. Pyörälä) (PP2) |
| | 1–6 | 57:01 – J. Keränen (S. Mäenalanen) (PP2) |

156 min
Penalties
26 min
22
Shots
35

| 22 March 2016; 18:30 | Kärpät | 3–0 (0–0, 1–0, 2–0) | TPS | Oulun Energia Areena, Oulu; Attendance: 6,070 |

Game reference

Sami Rajaniemi
Goalies
Teemu Lassila
Referees:
Aaro Brännare
Teemu Salminen
Linesmen:
Henri Neva
Hannu Sormunen

| M. Nutivaara (M. Aaltonen, M. Pyörälä) – 27:21 | 1–0 |
| S. Manninen (J. Ikonen, S. Aho) – 41:08 | 2–0 |
| S. Mäenalanen (S. Manninen) – 43:41 | 3–0 |

2 min
Penalties
10 min
30
Shots
19

| 24 March 2016; 18:30 | TPS | 2–1 (0–1, 1–0, 1–0) | Kärpät | HK Arena, Turku; Attendance: 7,531 |

Game reference

Teemu Lassila
Goalies
Sami Rajaniemi
Referees:
Timo Favorin
Jari Suorsa
Linesmen:
Markus Hägerström
Pasi Nieminen

| | 0–1 | 09:00 – J. Ikonen (M. Nutivaara, S. Aho) (PP1) |
| N. Friman (V-V Vainiola, E. Karvonen) – 27:26 | 1–1 |
| É. Perrin (T. Kallio) (PP1) – 44:47 | 2–1 |

6 min
Penalties
8 min
24
Shots
25

| 26 March 2016; 17:00 | Kärpät | 5–2 (0–0, 2–2, 3–0) | TPS | Oulun Energia Areena, Oulu; Attendance: 6,614 |

Game reference

Sami Rajaniemi
Goalies
Teemu Lassila
Referees:
Timo Metsälä
Teemu Salminen
Linesmen:
Henri Neva
Hannu Sormunen

| S. Aho (L. Kukkonen) (PP2) – 27:08 | 1–0 |
| L. Kukkonen (S. Aho, M. Nutivaara) (DP) – 29:10 | 2–0 |
| | 2–1 | 35:35 – H. Tallinder (K. Kaijomaa, F. Paré) |
| | 2–2 | 36:17 – T. Kallio (H. Tallinder, K. Kaijomaa) |
| J. Junttila (S. Manninen, J. Ikonen) – 40:53 | 3–2 |
| M. Pyörälä (A. Laatikainen, S. Manninen) (PP2) – 53:45 | 4–2 |
| J. Puljujärvi (S. Aho, M. Pyörälä) (PP1) – 54:30 | 5–2 |

6 min
Penalties
26 min
40
Shots
16

| 28 March 2016; 17:00 | TPS | 2–3 1OT (2–0, 0–0, 0–2, 0–1) | Kärpät | HK Arena, Turku; Attendance: 9,009 |

Game reference

Alexandar Georgiev
Goalies
Sami Rajaniemi
Referees:
Timo Favorin
Jari Suorsa
Linesmen:
Jani Pesonen
Teemu Riikonen

| F. Paré (E. Karvonen) – 05:53 | 1–0 |
| H. Tallinder (V-V Vainiola, E: Eronen) – 13:21 | 2–0 |
| | 2–1 | 46:08 – J. Puljujärvi (M. Pyörälä, S. Aho) (PP1) |
| | 2–2 | 53:37 – S. Mäenalanen (M. Aaltonen, M. Niemi) |
| | 2–3 | 60:16 – S. Manninen (A. Masuhr, J. Ikonen) |

4 min
Penalties
4 min
27
Shots
24

Kärpät wins the series 4–2.

==== (3) Tappara vs. (6) Lukko ====
| 18 March 2016; 18:30 | Tappara | 3–0 (1–0, 0–0, 2–0) | Lukko | Tampere Ice Stadium, Tampere; Attendance: 6,276 |

Game reference

Tomi Karhunen
Goalies
Ryan Zapolski
Referees:
Timo Metsälä
Teemu Salminen
Linesmen:
Jani Pesonen
Teemu Riikonen

| S. Dixon (J-M Järvinen, T. Mäntylä) (PP1) – 10:10 | 1–0 |
| V-M Savinainen (K. Kuusela) – 47:07 | 2–0 |
| J. Karjalainen (J. Peltola) – 55:48 | 3–0 |

12 min
Penalties
20 min
26
Shots
37

| 19 March 2016; 17:00 | Lukko | 5–0 (3–0, 1–0, 1–0) | Tappara | Äijänsuo Arena, Rauma; Attendance: 4,323 |

Game reference

Ryan Zapolski
Goalies
Tomi Karhunen
Referees:
Mikko Kaukokari
Tom Laaksonen
Linesmen:
Joona Elonen
Markus Hägerström

| J. Tommila (T. Koivisto, F. Riska) – 01:59 | 1–0 |
| T. Asplund (R. Ahonen, T. Koivisto) – 13:49 | 2–0 |
| F. Riska (T. Koivisto, O. Sipiläinen) – 15:53 | 3–0 |
| T. Nurmi (V. Vahalahti, J. Virtanen) (PP1) – 35:29 | 4–0 |
| T. Asplund (I. Mikkola, J. Virtanen) – 49:28 | 5–0 |

10 min
Penalties
37 min
35
Shots
18

| 22 March 2016; 18:30 | Tappara | 1–0 (1–0, 0–0, 0–0) | Lukko | Tampere Ice Stadium, Tampere; Attendance: 5,389 |

Game reference
| Tomi Karhunen | Goalies | Ryan Zapolski | Referees: Stefan Fonselius; Jani Luoma-Aho; Linesmen: Joona Elonen; Sakari Suominen |
| K. Kuusela (P. Laine, N. Plastino) (PP1) – 13:36 / 1–0 | | | Referees: Stefan Fonselius; Jani Luoma-Aho; Linesmen: Joona Elonen; Sakari Suominen |
| 6 min | Penalties | 2 min | Referees: Stefan Fonselius; Jani Luoma-Aho; Linesmen: Joona Elonen; Sakari Suominen |
| 23 | Shots | 34 | Referees: Stefan Fonselius; Jani Luoma-Aho; Linesmen: Joona Elonen; Sakari Suominen |

| 24 March 2016; 18:30 | Lukko | 1–3 (1–1, 0–1, 0–1) | Tappara | Äijänsuo Arena, Rauma; Attendance: 4,475 |

Game reference

Ryan Zapolski
Goalies
Dominik Hrachovina
Referees:
Stefan Fonselius
Jani Luoma-Aho
Linesmen:
Jani Pesonen
Teemu Riikonen

| T. Koivisto (P. Tiivola, J. Niskala) – 13:28 | 1–0 |
| | 1–1 | 15:41 – V-M Savinainen (N. Plastino, A. Ilomäki) |
| | 1–2 | 21:41 – J. Karjalainen |
| | 1–3 | 58:51 – J. Karjalainen |

4 min
Penalties
27 min
30
Shots
23

| 26 March 2016; 17:00 | Tappara | 5–3 (0–1, 1–2, 4–0) | Lukko | Tampere Ice Stadium, Tampere; Attendance: 7,300 |

Game reference

Dominik Hrachovina
Goalies
Ryan Zapolski
Referees:
Jari Levonen
Petri Lindqvist
Linesmen:
Joona Elonen
Sakari Suominen

| | 0–1 | 16:41 – P. Tiivola (J. Virtanen, J. Lahti) |
| P. Laine (N. Plastino) – 21:21 | 1–1 |
| | 1–2 | 26:48 – I. Mikkola (V. Vahalahti) |
| | 1–3 | 28:09 – V. Vahalahti (J. Niskala, T. Nurmi) (PP1) |
| H. Haapala (J. Lajunen) – 40:38 | 2–3 |
| K. Kuusela (P. Laine, N. Plastino) (PP1) – 45:00 | 3–3 |
| P. Laine (N. Plastino, K. Kuusela) (PP1) – 55:52 | 4–3 |
| J. Karjalainen (J. Peltola, J. Jasu) (EN) – 59:40 | 5–3 |

4 min
Penalties
6 min
33
Shots
32

Tappara wins the series 4–1.

==== (4) JYP vs. (5) SaiPa ====
| 18 March 2016; 18:30 | JYP | 4–1 (3–0, 1–0, 0–1) | SaiPa | Synergia-areena, Jyväskylä; Attendance: 3,531 |

Game reference

Tuomas Tarkki
Goalies
Jani Nieminen
Referees:
Jukka Hakkarainen
Lassi Heikkinen
Linesmen:
Iikka Kiilunen
Masi Puolakka

| M. Nenonen (M. Kalteva, A. Löfman) – 13:23 | 1–0 |
| J. Tuppurainen (R. Glenn, M. Luoma) (PP1) – 18:52 | 2–0 |
| M. Lahti (T. Pihlman, M. Salmio) – 19:34 | 3–0 |
| M. Lahti (D. Boyce, J. Kolehmainen) – 38:09 | 4–0 |
| | 4–1 | 51:42 – P. Savilahti-Nagander (V. Virkkunen) |

8 min
Penalties
6 min
21
Shots
36

| 19 March 2016; 17:00 | SaiPa | 2–4 (2–1, 0–1, 0–2) | JYP | Kisapuisto, Lappeenranta; Attendance: 4,480 |

Game reference

Jani Nieminen
Goalies
Tuomas Tarkki
Referees:
Petri Lindqvist
Jani Luoma-Aho
Linesmen:
Joonas Saha
Henri Tukia

| | 0–1 | 02:29 – M. Kalteva (M. Lahti) |
| B. Carson (M. Järvinen, L. Lappalainen) (PP1) – 08:26 | 1–1 |
| E. Kaksonen (K. Maalahti) – 16:54 | 2–1 |
| | 2–2 | 30:36 – P. Hubáček (M. Kalteva, J. Tavi) |
| | 2–3 | 42:51 – J. Tuppurainen (N. Yonkman, A. Löfman) |
| | 2–4 | 46:29 – M. Lahti (J. Kolehmainen, N. Yonkman) |

6 min
Penalties
10 min
34
Shots
23

| 22 March 2016; 18:30 | JYP | 1–2 (1–0, 0–2, 0–0) | SaiPa | Synergia-areena, Jyväskylä; Attendance: 3,436 |

Game reference

Tuomas Tarkki
Goalies
Jani Nieminen
Referees:
Jussi Leppänen
Jouni Saukkonen
Linesmen:
Iikka Kiilunen
Masi Puolakka

| D. Boyce (V. Hietanen, M. Salmio) – 09:00 | 1–0 |
| | 1–1 | 26:41 – C. Rau (D. McIntyre, S. Lofquist) (PP1) |
| | 1–2 | 28:31 – L. Lappalainen (V. Hämäläinen, T. Leivo) |

8 min
Penalties
12 min
31
Shots
15

| 24 March 2016; 18:30 | SaiPa | 1–4 (1–2, 0–1, 0–1) | JYP | Kisapuisto, Lappeenranta; Attendance: 4,680 |

Game reference

Jani Nieminen
Goalies
Tuomas Tarkki
Referees:
Jukka Hakkarainen
Mikko Kaukokari
Linesmen:
Joonas Saha
Henri Tukia

| | 0–1 | 10:43 – J. Tavi (D. Boyce, M. Kalteva) (PP1) |
| | 0–2 | 15:42 – M. Nenonen (J. Tuppurainen, A. Löfman) |
| V. Vainikainen (V. Virkkunen, V. Hämäläinen) – 17:31 | 1–2 |
| | 1–3 | 25:00 – A. Löfman (V. Kemiläinen) |
| | 1–4 | 51:19 – D. Boyce (V. Hotakainen) |

4 min
Penalties
10 min
30
Shots
20

| 26 March 2016; 17:00 | JYP | 2–3 (1–1, 0–1, 1–1) | SaiPa | Synergia-areena, Jyväskylä; Attendance: 4,437 |

Game reference

Tuomas Tarkki
Goalies
Jani Nieminen
Referees:
Mikko Kaukokari
Tom Laaksonen
Linesmen:
Joonas Saha
Daniel Österholm

| J. Tuppurainen (A. Löfman, M. Nenonen) – 14:28 | 1–0 |
| | 1–1 | 18:55 – C. Rau (B. Carson, L. Lappalainen) (PP1) |
| | 1–2 | 23:49 – M. Järvinen (K. Maalahti, C. Rau) |
| | 1–3 | 59:19 – V. Hämäläinen (S. Venäläinen) (EN) |
| D. Boyce (R. Glenn, M. Luoma) – 59:28 | 2–3 |

18 min
Penalties
10 min
33
Shots
24

| 28 March 2016; 17:00 | SaiPa | 1–3 (1–1, 0–1, 0–1) | JYP | Kisapuisto, Lappeenranta; Attendance: 4,244 |

Game reference

Jani Nieminen
Goalies
Tuomas Tarkki
Referees:
Mikko Kaukokari
Tom Laaksonen
Linesmen:
Iikka Kiilunen
Masi Puolakka

| | 0–1 | 01:09 – H. Kanninen (M. Luoma) |
| E. Kaksonen (D. McIntyre, T. Jokinen) – 13:47 | 1–1 |
| | 1–2 | 23:27 – M. Kalteva (V. Kemiläinen, J. Tuppurainen) (PP1) |
| | 1–3 | 59:28 – J. Tuppurainen (EN) |

31 min
Penalties
12 min
26
Shots
29

JYP wins the series 4–2.

=== Semifinals (best-of-seven) ===
==== (1) HIFK vs. (4) JYP ====
| 1 April 2016; 18:30 | HIFK | 4–2 (1–2, 2–0, 1–0) | JYP | Helsinki Ice Hall, Helsinki; Attendance: 8,007 |

Game reference

Kevin Lankinen
Goalies
Veini Vehviläinen
Referees:
Timo Metsälä
Teemu Salminen
Linesmen:
Jani Pesonen
Teemu Riikonen

| | 0–1 | 03:29 – J.Tavi (N. Yonkman, V. Vehviläinen) |
| | 0–2 | 12:18 – T. Pihlman (V. Hotakainen, M. Salmio) |
| Y. Auvitu (J. Rask, T. Ramstedt) – 15:27 | 1–2 |
| R. Hintz (T. Taimi, M. Partanen) (PP1) – 27:06 | 2–2 |
| R. Hintz – 30:17 | 3–2 |
| C. Elkins (SH, EN) – 59:23 | 4–2 |

6 min
Penalties
12 min
17
Shots
28

| 2 April 2016; 17:00 | JYP | 5–2 (3–0, 2–2, 0–0) | HIFK | Synergia-areena, Jyväskylä; Attendance: 4,324 |

Game reference

Tuomas Tarkki
Goalies
Kevin Lankinen
Referees:
Jari-Pekka Pajula
Anssi Salonen
Linesmen:
Joona Elonen
Sakari Suominen

| R. Glenn (J. Tuppurainen, M. Lahti) – 05:28 | 1–0 |
| J. Nättinen (T. Pihlman, M. Nenonen) (PP1) – 12:13 | 2–0 |
| M. Nenonen (V. Hietanen) – 16:17 | 3–0 |
| | 3–1 | 20:50 – T. Taimi (M. Partanen, R. Leino) (PP1) |
| P. Hubáček (M. Luoma) – 22:04 | 4–1 |
| J. Nättinen (P. Hubáček, H. Kanninen) – 28:24 | 5–1 |
| | 5–2 | 38:50 – Y. Auvitu (S. Liivik) |

8 min
Penalties
10 min
43
Shots
32

| 4 April 2016; 18:30 | HIFK | 7–1 (1–0, 6–1, 0–0) | JYP | Helsinki Ice Hall, Helsinki; Attendance: 7,518 |

Game reference

Ville Husso
Goalies
~~Tuomas Tarkki~~Veini Vehviläinen
Referees:
Timo Favorin
Jari Suorsa
Linesmen:
Pasi Nieminen
Jani Pesonen

| J. Puustinen (Y. Auvitu, J. Rask) (PP1) – 11:24 | 1–0 |
| T. Ramstedt – 26:14 | 2–0 |
| A. Luttinen (J. Puustinen, T. Ramstedt) (PP1) – 30:27 | 3–0 |
| C. Elkins (J. Ikonen, M. Generous) – 30:52 | 4–0 |
| M. Generous (T. Nykopp, L. Taipalus) (DP) – 31:20 | 5–0 |
| | 5–1 | 34:50 – M. Salmio (M. Luoma, D. Boyce) |
| J. Rask (Y. Auvitu, M. Teppo) – 35:42 | 6–1 |
| T. Záborský (T. Ramstedt, J. Rask) (DP) – 36:49 | 7–1 |

12 min
Penalties
28 min
22
Shots
24

| 6 April 2016; 18:30 | JYP | 3–2 (3–1, 0–1, 0–0) | HIFK | Synergia-areena, Jyväskylä; Attendance: 3,833 |

Game reference

Tuomas Tarkki
Goalies
Ville Husso
Referees:
Jari-Pekka Pajula
Anssi Salonen
Linesmen:
Joona Elonen
Sakari Suominen

| V. Kemiläinen (J. Tuppurainen, J. Nättinen) (PP2) – 01:26 | 1–0 |
| J. Tuppurainen (A. Löfman, V. Kemiläinen) (PP1) – 02:05 | 2–0 |
| J. Kolehmainen (T. Pihlman) – 02:52 | 3–0 |
| | 3–1 | 19:50 – Y. Auvitu (J. Puustinen, J. Rask) (PP1) |
| | 3–2 | 38:42 – M. Partanen (R. Hintz, J. Salmi) |

6 min
Penalties
8 min
19
Shots
24

| 8 April 2016; 18:30 | HIFK | 5–3 (3–0, 1–1, 1–2) | JYP | Helsinki Ice Hall, Helsinki; Attendance: 8,200 |

Game reference

Ville Husso
Goalies
Tuomas Tarkki
Referees:
Jari-Pekka Pajula
Anssi Salonen
Linesmen:
Pasi Nieminen
Sakari Suominen

| C. Elkins (J. Ikonen, K. Aulie) – 07:51 | 1–0 |
| Y. Auvitu (T. Záborský, T. Ramstedt) (DP) – 11:24 | 2–0 |
| T. Záborský (M. Partanen, T. Taimi) (PP1) – 15:21 | 3–0 |
| M. Partanen – 21:21 | 4–0 |
| | 4–1 | 27:56 – M. Salmio (V. Kemiläinen, D. Boyce) |
| | 4–2 | 44:27 – J. Tavi (M. Luoma) |
| J. Ikonen (C. Elkins, T. Taimi) – 54:56 | 5–2 |
| | 5–3 | 57:15 – M. Nenonen (J. Kolehmainen, M. Kalteva) |

4 min
Penalties
6 min
26
Shots
30

| 11 April 2016; 18:30 | JYP | 0–4 (0–0, 0–2, 0–2) | HIFK | Synergia-areena, Jyväskylä; Attendance: 3,793 |

Game reference

Tuomas Tarkki
Goalies
Ville Husso
Referees:
Timo Favorin
Stefan Fonselius
Linesmen:
Pasi Nieminen
Sakari Suominen

| 0–1 | 24:39 – J. Puustinen (Y. Auvitu, T. Ramstedt) (PP1) |
| 0–2 | 27:36 – K. Aulie (T. Ramstedt, J. Rask) |
| 0–3 | 44:20 – J. Rask (T. Ramstedt, Y. Auvitu) (PP1) |
| 0–4 | 48:19 – A. Luttinen (T. Ramstedt, J. Rask) (PP1) |

8 min
Penalties
2 min
24
Shots
23

HIFK wins the series 4–2.

==== (2) Kärpät vs. (3) Tappara ====
| 1 April 2016; 18:30 | Kärpät | 1–3 (1–0, 0–1, 0–2) | Tappara | Oulun Energia Areena, Oulu; Attendance: 6,011 |

Game reference

Sami Rajaniemi
Goalies
Tomi Karhunen
Referees:
Mikko Kaukokari
Tom Laaksonen
Linesmen:
Henri Neva
Hannu Sormunen

| L. Kukkonen (S. Aho, J. Puljujärvi) (PP1) – 05:47 | 1–0 |
| | 1–1 | 31:19 – K. Kuusela (H. Haapala, A. Elorinne) |
| | 1–2 | 56:56 – J. Lajunen (H. Haapala, M. Kankaanperä) |
| | 1–3 | 59:02 – M. Kankaanperä (EN) |

6 min
Penalties
18 min
31
Shots
18

| 2 April 2016; 17:00 | Tappara | 4–1 (1–0, 0–1, 3–0) | Kärpät | Tampere Ice Stadium, Tampere; Attendance: 7,044 |

Game reference

Tomi Karhunen
Goalies
~~Sami Rajaniemi~~
Sami Aittokallio
Referees:
Stefan Fonselius
Jari Levonen
Linesmen:
Masi Puolakka
Joonas Saha

| N. Plastino (K. Kuusela, A. Ilomäki) – 19:00 | 1–0 |
| | 1–1 | 35:35 – J. Ikonen (S. Aho, A. Laatikainen) (PP1) |
| J. Lajunen (K. Kuusela, J. Karjalainen) (PP1) – 41:09 | 2–1 |
| P. Laine (J. Lajunen, K. Kuusela) (PP1) – 44:05 | 3–1 |
| J. Peltola (J. Jasu, J. Lajunen) (EN) – 58:29 | 4–1 |

27 min
Penalties
45 min
32
Shots
25

| 5 April 2016; 18:30 | Kärpät | 4–1 (0–0, 3–1, 1–0) | Tappara | Oulun Energia Areena, Oulu; Attendance: 6,007 |

Game reference

Sami Rajaniemi
Goalies
Tomi Karhunen
Referees:
Stefan Fonselius
Jari Levonen
Linesmen:
Henri Neva
Hannu Sormunen

| A. Masuhr – 26:49 | 1–0 |
| | 1–1 | 29:38 – J. Lajunen (K. Kuusela) (SH) |
| M. Pyörälä (J. Ikonen, S. Aho) – 30:25 | 2–1 |
| J. Junttila (A. Laatikainen) – 38:10 | 3–1 |
| J. Junttila (SH, EN) – 57:31 | 4–1 |

8 min
Penalties
18 min
35
Shots
29

| 7 April 2016; 18:30 | Tappara | 2–3 2OT (2–2, 0–0, 0–0, 0–0, 0–1) | Kärpät | Tampere Ice Stadium, Tampere; Attendance: 7,124 |

Game reference

Tomi Karhunen
Goalies
Sami Rajaniemi
Referees:
Teemu Salminen
Jari Suorsa
Linesmen:
Jani Pesonen
Teemu Riikonen

| | 0–1 | 05:30 – S. Aho (J. Hakanpää) |
| | 0–2 | 11:39 – E. Pirnes (M. Pyörälä, J. Hakanpää) |
| P. Laine (J-M Järvinen, V-M Savinainen) (PP2) – 16:55 | 1–2 |
| P. Laine (J. Lajunen) – 19:56 | 2–2 |
| | 2–3 | 80:24 – J. Puljujärvi (E. Pirnes, M. Pyörälä) |

6 min
Penalties
14 min
33
Shots
37

| 9 April 2016; 17:00 | Kärpät | 3–4 1OT (0–1, 1–1, 2–1, 0–1) | Tappara | Oulun Energia Areena, Oulu; Attendance: 6,614 |

Game reference

Sami Rajaniemi
Goalies
Tomi Karhunen
Referees:
Mikko Kaukokari
Tom Laaksonen
Linesmen:
Joonas Saha
Daniel Österholm

| | 0–1 | 05:07 – P. Laine (N. Plastino, J. Karjalainen) (PP1) |
| | 0–2 | 29:14 – T. Aalto (T. Mäntylä, H. Haapala) (PP1) |
| T. Ronkainen (J. Puljujärvi, J. Hakanpää) – 36:28 | 1–2 |
| A. Masuhr (L. Kukkonen, J. Puljujärvi) (PP1) – 40:47 | 2–2 |
| I. Huml (J. Sailio, J. Keränen) – 54:02 | 3–2 |
| | 3–3 | 59:08 – P. Laine (J. Jasu, K. Kuusela) (PP1) |
| | 3–4 | 68:17 – H. Haapala (K. Kuusela) |

8 min
Penalties
12 min
35
Shots
27

| 11 April 2016; 18:30 | Tappara | 2–3 1OT (0–0, 0–2, 2–0, 0–1) | Kärpät | Tampere Ice Stadium, Tampere; Attendance: 7,300 |

Game reference

Tomi Karhunen
Goalies
Sami Aittokallio
Referees:
Mikko Kaukokari
Tom Laaksonen
Linesmen:
Henri Neva
Hannu Sormunen

| | 0–1 | 21:30 – J. Hakanpää |
| | 0–2 | 39:38 – T. Ronkainen (J. Hakanpää, S. Aho) |
| N. Plastino (K. Kuusela, J. Lajunen) – 51:02 | 1–2 |
| P. Laine (J-M Järvinen) – 59:59 | 2–2 |
| | 2–3 | 76:58 – M. Pyörälä (J. Puljujärvi, E. Pirnes) |

0 min
Penalties
12 min
31
Shots
26

| 12 April 2016; 18:30 | Kärpät | 0–2 (0–0, 0–2, 0–0) | Tappara | Oulun Energia Areena, Oulu; Attendance: 6,614 |

Game reference
| Sami Aittokallio | Goalies | Tomi Karhunen | Referees: Stefan Fonselius; Jari Levonen; Linesmen: Henri Neva; Hannu Sormunen |
| 0–1 / 26:24 – T. Aalto (J-M Järvinen, V-M Savinainen); 0–2 / 38:22 – S. Dixon (O. Rauhala) | | | Referees: Stefan Fonselius; Jari Levonen; Linesmen: Henri Neva; Hannu Sormunen |
| 2 min | Penalties | 2 min | Referees: Stefan Fonselius; Jari Levonen; Linesmen: Henri Neva; Hannu Sormunen |
| 27 | Shots | 24 | Referees: Stefan Fonselius; Jari Levonen; Linesmen: Henri Neva; Hannu Sormunen |

Tappara wins the series 4–3.

=== Bronze medal game ===
| 15 April 2015; 18:30 | Kärpät | 3–2 (0–1, 0–1, 3–0) | JYP | Oulun Energia Areena, Oulu; Attendance: 5,112 |

Game reference

Sami Rajaniemi
Goalies
Veini Vehviläinen
Referees:
Timo Favorin
Anssi Salonen
Linesmen:
Pasi Nieminen
Daniel Österholm

| | 0–1 | 18:46 – T. Pihlman (J. Tuppurainen, J. Nättinen) (PP2) |
| | 0–2 | 27:26 – H. Kanninen (T. Nättinen, P. Hubáček) |
| J. Puljujärvi (S. Aho, M. Pyörälä) (PP1) – 46:43 | 1–2 |
| A. Laatikainen (J. Puljujärvi, E. Pirnes) – 47:06 | 2–2 |
| T. Ronkainen (J. Hakanpää, S. Aho) – 50:38 | 3–2 |

4 min
Penalties
6 min
18
Shots
36

=== Finals (best-of-seven) ===
| 15 April 2016; 18:30 | HIFK | 4–0 (2–0, 1–0, 1–0) | Tappara | Helsinki Ice Hall, Helsinki; Attendance: 8,200 |

Game reference

Ville Husso
Goalies
Tomi Karhunen
Referees:
Stefan Fonselius
Jari Levonen
Linesmen:
Joona Elonen
Sakari Suominen

| J. Rask (J. Järvinen, T. Ramstedt) – 00:52 | 1–0 |
| J. Ikonen (C. Elkins) – 19:44 | 2–0 |
| Y. Auvitu (J. Rask, T. Ramstedt) – 23:09 | 3–0 |
| T. Tuomisto (M-M Åsten, T. Nykopp) (EN) – 56:51 | 4–0 |

10 min
Penalties
10 min
23
Shots
24

| 16 April 2016; 17:00 | Tappara | 2–1 (0–0, 1–0, 1–1) | HIFK | Tampere Ice Stadium, Tampere; Attendance: 7,300 |

Game reference

Tomi Karhunen
Goalies
Ville Husso
Referees:
Stefan Fonselius
Teemu Salminen
Linesmen:
Jani Pesonen
Teemu Riikonen

| K. Kuusela (N. Plastino, J. Lajunen) (PP) – 29:26 | 1–0 |
| | 1–1 | 49:08 – T. Záborský (D. Grillfors, J. Rask) |
| J. Jasu (J. Peltola, P. Laine) – 54:24 | 2–1 |

8 min
Penalties
20 min
24
Shots
35

| 19 April 2016; 18:30 | HIFK | 6–0 (1–0, 2–0, 3–0) | Tappara | Helsinki Ice Hall, Helsinki; Attendance: 8,200 |

Game reference

Ville Husso
Goalies
Tomi Karhunen
Referees:
Stefan Fonselius
Jari Levonen
Linesmen:
Henri Neva
Hannu Sormunen

| A. Luttinen (Y. Auvitu) – 13:36 | 1–0 |
| C. Elkins (A. Luttinen, J. Ikonen) – 21:03 | 2–0 |
| T. Ramstedt (J. Rask, T. Záborský) – 31:35 | 3–0 |
| C. Elkins (T. Záborský, T. Ramstedt) – 52:10 | 4–0 |
| J. Puustinen (R. Leino, L. Taipalus) – 54:59 | 5–0 |
| R. Leino (J. Puustinen, T. Tuomisto) – 57:13 | 6–0 |

4 min
Penalties
4 min
22
Shots
25

| 22 April 2016; 18:30 | Tappara | 3–0 (1–0, 0–0, 2–0) | HIFK | Tampere Ice Stadium, Tampere; Attendance: 7,300 |

Game reference

Tomi Karhunen
Goalies
Ville Husso
Referees:
Stefan Fonselius
Jari Levonen
Linesmen:
Joona Elonen
Sakari Suominen

| P. Laine – 13:51 | 1–0 |
| J. Lajunen (P. Laine) – 51:34 | 2–0 |
| K. Kuusela (P. Laine, N. Plastino) (PP1) – 53:12 | 3–0 |

18 min
Penalties
42 min
27
Shots
26

| 23 April 2016; 17:00 | HIFK | 1–2 (1–0, 0–1, 0–1) | Tappara | Helsinki Ice Hall, Helsinki; Attendance: 8,200 |

Game reference

Ville Husso
Goalies
Tomi Karhunen
Referees:
Stefan Fonselius
Jari Levonen
Linesmen:
Joona Elonen
Sakari Suominen

| L. Taipalus (M-M Åsten) – 11:00 | 1–0 |
| | 1–1 | 35:29 – A. Elorinne (J. Jasu) |
| | 1–2 | 54:45 – J. Karjalainen (N. Plastino) |

2 min
Penalties
2 min
29
Shots
37

| 26 April 2016; 18:30 | Tappara | 2–1 (2–1, 0–0, 0–0) | HIFK | Tampere Ice Stadium, Tampere; Attendance: 7,300 |

Game reference

Tomi Karhunen
Goalies
Ville Husso
Referees:
Teemu Salminen
Jari Suorsa
Linesmen:
Jani Pesonen
Teemu Riikonen

| | 0–1 | 03:21 – J. Puustinen (J. Rask) |
| P. Laine (K. Kuusela) – 07:55 | 1–1 |
| H. Haapala (A. Elorinne) – 10:58 | 2–1 |

6 min
Penalties
6 min
19
Shots
25

Tappara wins the finals 4–2.

== Final rankings ==
| Gold medal | Tappara |
| Silver medal | HIFK |
| Bronze medal | Kärpät |
| 4 | JYP |
| 5 | SaiPa |
| 6 | Lukko |
| 7 | TPS |
| 8 | Pelicans |
| 9 | KalPa |
| 10 | Sport |
| 11 | KooKoo |
| 12 | Ässät |
| 13 | HPK |
| 14 | Ilves |
| 15 | Blues |
