= Rekonen =

Rekonen is a Finnish surname. Notable people with the surname include:

- Aleksi Rekonen (born 1993), Finnish ice hockey player
- Heimo Rekonen (1920–1997), Finnish politician

== See also ==
- Reponen
