= Ronkainen =

Ronkainen is a Finnish surname. Notable people with the surname include:

- Antti Ronkainen (born 1968), Finnish footballer
- Ilkka Ronkainen (born 1940s), Finnish/American organizational theorist
- Jari Ronkainen (born 1972), Finnish politician
- Mika Ronkainen (born 1970), Finnish film director
- Mikko Ronkainen (born 1978), Finnish freestyle skier
- Rauno Ronkainen (born 1964), Finnish TV and film cinematographer and cameraman
- Taneli Ronkainen (born 1995), Finnish ice hockey player
