= Pöyhönen =

Surname list

Pöyhönen is a surname. Notable people with the surname include:

- Janne Pöyhönen, Finnish reggae artist
- Jere Pöyhönen (born 1993), Finnish rapper, singer and songwriter
- Marko Pöyhönen (born 1987), Finnish ice hockey player
- Markus Pöyhönen (born 1978), Finnish track and field athlete
- Nora Pöyhönen (1849–1938), Finnish horticulturist
- Taavi Pöyhönen (1882–1961), Finnish politician
- Tapio Pöyhönen (1927–2011), Finnish basketball player
- Valtteri Laurell Pöyhönen (born 1978), Finnish jazz guitarist
