= Teemu Ramstedt =

Finnish ice hockey player

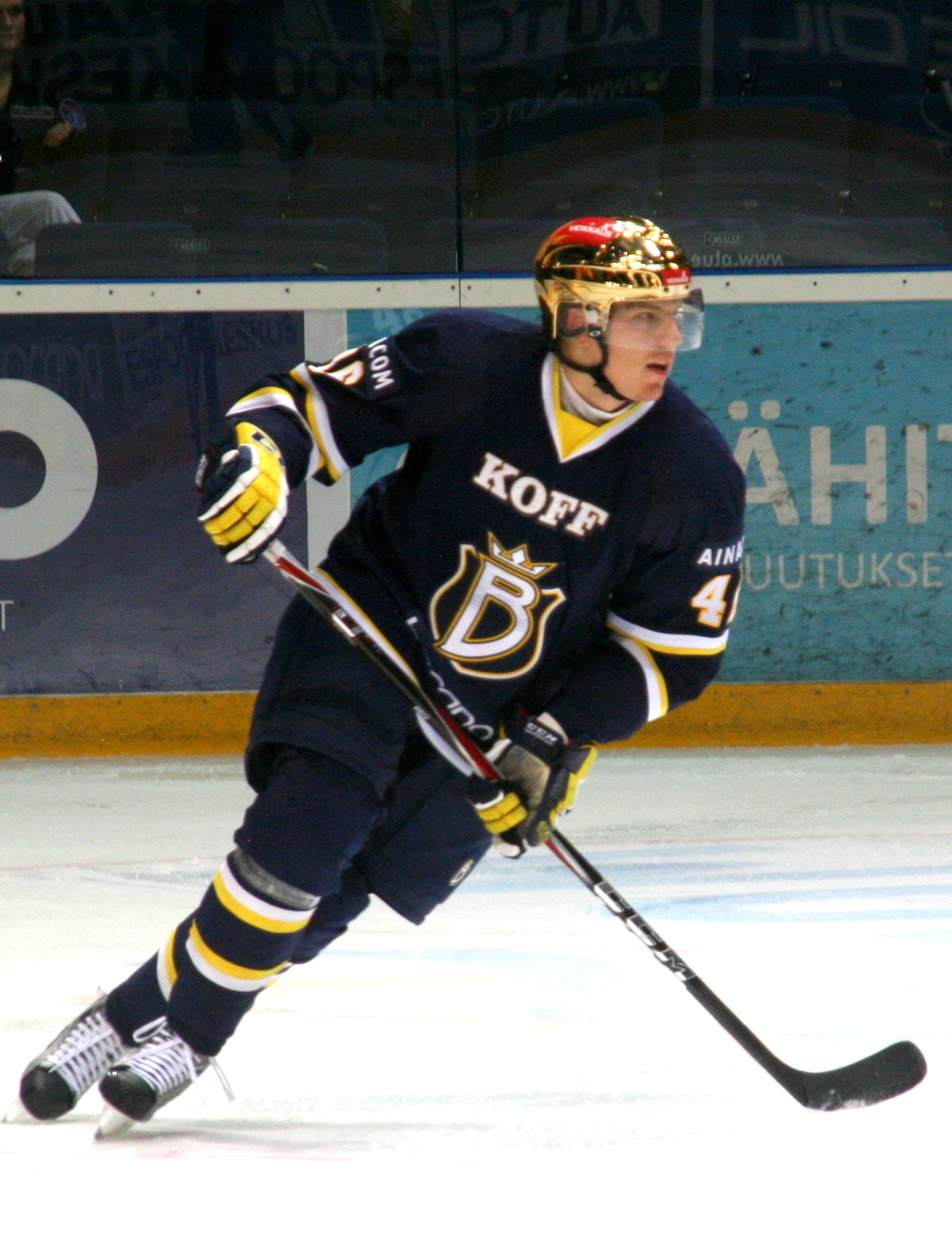
- Born: 9 December 1987 (age 38) Helsinki, Finland
- Height: 5 ft 11 in (180 cm)
- Weight: 201 lb (91 kg; 14 st 5 lb)
- Position: Centre
- Shoots: Left
- team Former teams: SaiPa; HIFK; HC TPS; Espoo Blues; SKA Saint Petersburg; AIK IF; Amur Khabarovsk; HC Slovan Bratislava; Lukko
- Playing career: 2006–present

Teemu Ramstedt (born 9 December 1987) is a Finnish professional ice hockey centre who is currently playing for SaiPa of the Finnish Liiga.

== Playing career ==
Ramstedt as a youth played bandy along with ice hockey until Junior C. He won the championship with HIFK in Junior E and Junior C.

In the 2016–17 season, Ramstedt continued his career abroad, returning to the Kontinental Hockey League in playing for his second Russian club, Amur Khabarovsk.

After registering 25 points in 49 games with Khabarovsk, Ramstedt continued in the KHL, agreeing to a one-year deal with HC Slovan Bratislava for the 2017–18 season on 1 August 2017. His contract was terminated in late September after two scoreless games with Bratislava, opting to return to the Liiga in agreeing to a contract for the remainder of the season with Lukko on 27 November 2017. He returned to his previous form in recording 9 goals and 22 points in 34 regular season games.

== Career statistics ==
			Regular season					Playoffs
Season	Team	League	GP	G	A	Pts	PIM	GP	G	A	Pts	PIM
2002–03	HIFK U16	U16 SM-sarja	14	12	11	23	4	6	6	4	10	2
2003–04	HIFK U18	U18 SM-sarja	30	20	20	40	8	7	2	5	7	8
2004–05	HIFK U18	U18 SM-sarja	16	16	12	28	14	7	6	4	10	2
2004–05	HIFK U20	U20 SM-liiga	20	3	5	8	0	3	0	0	0	0
2005–06	HIFK U20	U20 SM-liiga	38	19	30	49	30	—	—	—	—	—
2005–06	HIFK	SM-liiga	1	0	0	0	0	—	—	—	—	—
2005–06	Suomi U20	Mestis	6	1	0	1	0	—	—	—	—	—
2006–07	TPS U20	U20 SM-liiga	29	14	22	36	16	5	4	3	7	4
2006–07	HC TPS	SM-liiga	36	0	0	0	2	1	0	0	0	0
2006–07	Suomi U20	Mestis	2	0	0	0	0	—	—	—	—	—
2006–07	FPS	Mestis	4	0	3	3	0	—	—	—	—	—
2007–08	TPS	SM-liiga	38	3	3	6	10	—	—	—	—	—
2007–08	KooKoo	Mestis	9	1	6	7	4	7	2	2	4	0
2008–09	HIFK	SM-liiga	56	12	11	23	24	2	1	0	1	0
2009–10	HIFK	SM-liiga	58	10	33	43	10	6	1	1	2	8
2010–11	HIFK	SM-liiga	56	9	23	32	22	1	0	0	0	0
2011–12	HIFK	SM-liiga	36	4	14	18	8	16	2	3	5	25
2012–13	HIFK	SM-liiga	39	9	25	34	12	—	—	—	—	—
2012–13	SKA St. Petersburg	KHL	8	0	1	1	2	15	3	5	8	8
2013–14	AIK	SHL	36	6	14	20	46	—	—	—	—	—
2013–14	HIFK	Liiga	15	1	5	6	0	2	0	0	0	0
2014–15	HIFK	Liiga	55	16	24	40	14	8	2	7	9	0
2015–16	HIFK	Liiga	60	8	44	52	14	18	5	13	18	2
2016–17	Amur Khabarovsk	KHL	49	7	18	25	14	—	—	—	—	—
2017–18	HC Slovan Bratislava	KHL	2	0	0	0	0	—	—	—	—	—
2017–18	Lukko	Liiga	34	9	13	22	12	2	0	1	1	0
2019–20	SaiPa	Liiga	45	4	27	31	14	—	—	—	—	—
2019–20	Kiekko-Espoo	Suomi-sarja	2	2	1	3	4	5	1	4	5	2
2020–21	Kiekko-Espoo	Mestis	2	0	2	2	0	—	—	—	—	—
Liiga totals			529	85	222	307	142	56	11	25	36	35
