= Elmeri Kaksonen =

Finnish ice hockey player

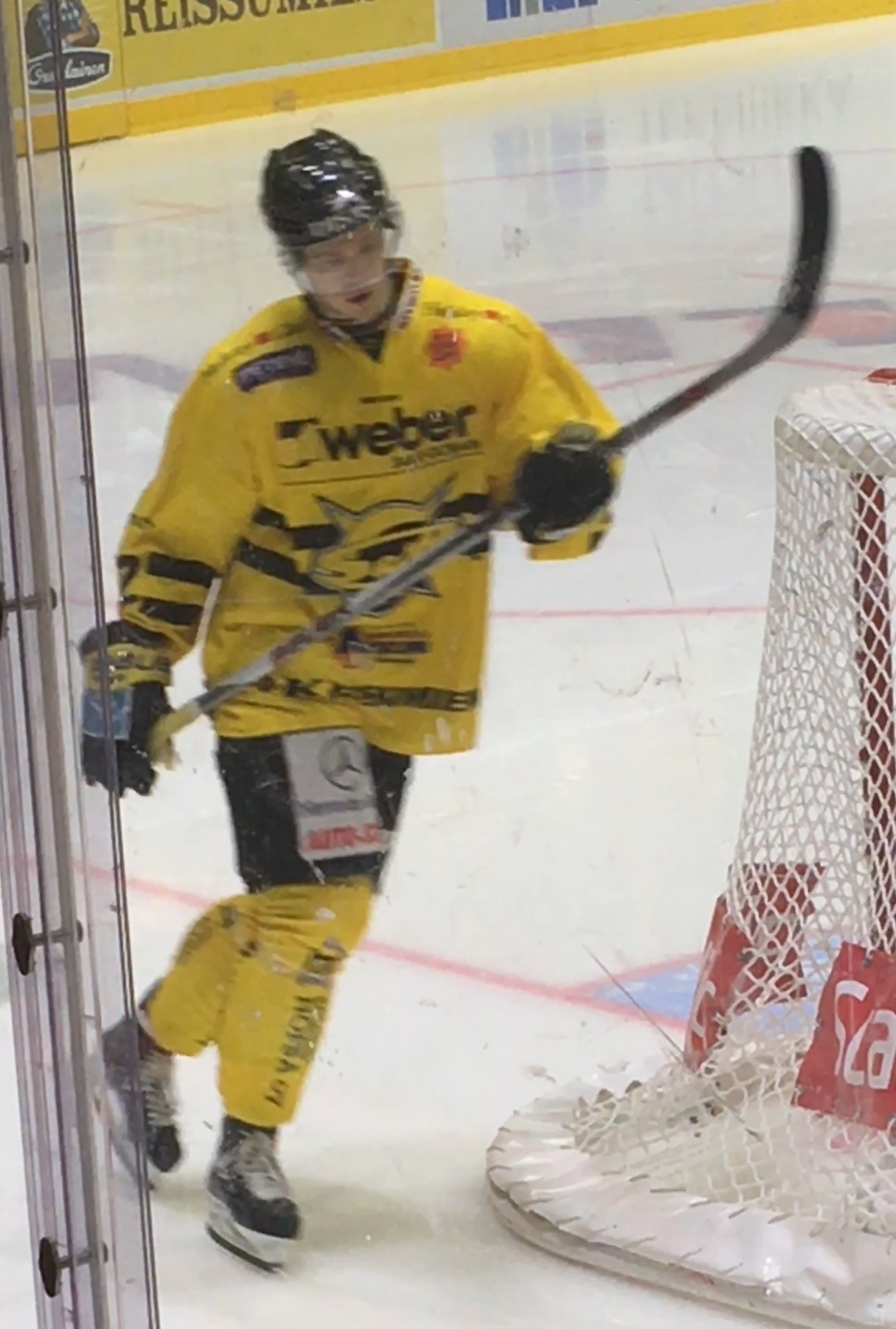
- Born: 12 February 1987 (age 38); Savonlinna, Finland
- Height: 6 ft 0 in (183 cm)
- Weight: 181 lb (82 kg; 12 st 13 lb)
- Position: Left wing
- Shoots: Left
- Mestis team Former teams: Ketterä; SaiPa; Tappara; HPK; Oulun Kärpät
- Playing career: 2007–present

Elmeri Kaksonen is a Finnish professional ice hockey player who currently plays for Ketterä in the Mestis. He originally made his professional debut with SaiPa of the then SM-liiga.

== Career statistics ==
			Regular season					Playoffs
Season	Team	League	GP	G	A	Pts	PIM	GP	G	A	Pts	PIM
2002–03	SaPKo U16	U16 I-Divisioona	13	18	7	25	26	2	0	2	2	2
2003–04	SaPKo U18	U18 I-Divisioona	6	4	3	7	2	—	—	—	—	—
2003–04	SaPKo U20	U20 I-Divisioona	11	5	3	8	2	—	—	—	—	—
2004–05	SaiPa U18	U18 SM-sarja	14	5	5	10	6	—	—	—	—	—
2004–05	SaiPa U20	U20 SM-liiga	14	0	3	3	4	—	—	—	—	—
2005–06	SaiPa U20	U20 SM-liiga	37	7	9	16	14	—	—	—	—	—
2006–07	SaiPa U20	U20 SM-liiga	40	9	13	22	20	—	—	—	—	—
2007–08	SaiPa U20	U20 SM-liiga	24	7	11	18	10	—	—	—	—	—
2007–08	SaiPa	SM-liiga	26	1	1	2	27	—	—	—	—	—
2008–09	SaiPa	SM-liiga	30	1	4	5	6	—	—	—	—	—
2008–09	Kotkan Titaanit	Mestis	1	0	2	2	0	—	—	—	—	—
2009–10	SaiPa U20	U20 SM-liiga	1	1	1	2	2	—	—	—	—	—
2009–10	SaiPa	SM-liiga	47	0	6	6	6	—	—	—	—	—
2009–10	Mikkelin Jukurit	Mestis	3	0	0	0	0	—	—	—	—	—
2010–11	SaiPa	SM-liiga	47	3	8	11	16	—	—	—	—	—
2011–12	SaiPa	SM-liiga	50	11	14	25	18	—	—	—	—	—
2012–13	Tappara	SM-liiga	53	5	6	11	6	15	0	5	5	4
2013–14	Tappara	Liiga	30	1	1	2	8	18	1	2	3	0
2013–14	LeKi	Mestis	3	3	3	6	0	—	—	—	—	—
2014–15	Tappara	Liiga	60	4	5	9	16	16	1	0	1	0
2015–16	Tappara	Liiga	44	2	3	5	10	—	—	—	—	—
2015–16	SaiPa	Liiga	14	2	3	5	4	6	2	0	2	0
2016–17	SaiPa	Liiga	52	7	10	17	30	—	—	—	—	—
2017–18	SaiPa	Liiga	51	12	18	30	24	9	2	2	4	0
2018–19	SaiPa	Liiga	20	5	4	9	0	3	0	2	2	0
2019–20	SaiPa	Liiga	37	4	5	9	10	—	—	—	—	—
2020–21	SaiPa	Liiga	49	9	5	14	14	—	—	—	—	—
2021–22	Imatran Ketterä	Mestis	46	25	28	53	18	15	4	10	14	4
2021–22	HPK	Liiga	4	0	0	0	0	—	—	—	—	—
2021–22	Oulun Kärpät	Liiga	3	0	0	0	2	—	—	—	—	—
2022–23	Imatran Ketterä	Mestis	40	14	22	36	12	13	5	10	15	6
Liiga totals			617	67	93	160	197	67	6	11	17	4
