= Janne Tavi =

Finnish ice hockey player (born 1989)

- Born: September 13, 1989 (age 36) Helsinki, Finland
- Height: 5 ft 10 in (178 cm)
- Position: Forward
- Shoots: Left
- team Former teams: Free agent Pelicans; HeKi; SaiPa; JYP Jyväskylä; KalPa; Mikkelin Jukurit; HPK; Gladiators HT; Jokipojat; HK Poprad
- Playing career: 2007–present

Janne Tavi (born September 13, 1989) is a Finnish professional ice hockey forward. He is currently a free agent.

== Career ==
He had previously played for Pelicans of the SM-liiga.

== Career statistics ==
=== Regular season and playoffs ===
			Regular season					Playoffs
Season	Team	League	GP	G	A	Pts	PIM	GP	G	A	Pts	PIM
2005–06	Jokerit	Jr. A	2	0	0	0	0	3	0	0	0	0
2006–07	Jokerit	Jr. A	31	4	4	8	14	5	0	1	1	0
2007–08	Jokerit	Jr. A	41	17	25	41	31	4	1	3	4	0
2007–08	Suomi U20	Mestis	3	0	1	1	0	—	—	—	—	—
2008–09	Pelicans	Jr. A	14	7	8	15	0	4	0	0	0	0
2008–09	Pelicans	SM-liiga	2	0	0	0	0	—	—	—	—	—
2008–09	HeKi	Mestis	27	4	9	13	0	—	—	—	—	—
2008–09	Suomi U20	Mestis	4	1	0	1	2	—	—	—	—	—
2009–10	Pelicans	Jr. A	5	2	3	5	2	—	—	—	—	—
2009–10	Pelicans	SM-liiga	16	1	2	3	2	—	—	—	—	—
2009–10	HeKi	Mestis	30	11	15	26	14	—	—	—	—	—
2010–11	Pelicans	Jr. A	2	3	2	5	2	—	—	—	—	—
2010–11	Pelicans	SM-liiga	56	12	5	17	6	—	—	—	—	—
2011–12	Pelicans	SM-liiga	51	8	8	16	4	1	0	0	0	0
2012–13	Pelicans	SM-liiga	60	16	11	27	4	—	—	—	—	—
2013–14	SaiPa	Liiga	60	10	26	36	4	13	3	2	5	0
2014–15	SaiPa	Liiga	48	13	13	26	16	—	—	—	—	—
2015–16	JYP Jyväskylä	Liiga	58	11	14	25	14	12	3	2	5	4
2016–17	JYP Jyväskylä	Liiga	60	13	21	34	6	15	1	8	9	8
2017–18	KalPa	Liiga	60	10	17	27	6	6	3	1	4	0
2018–19	Mikkelin Jukurit	Liiga	50	5	13	18	4	—	—	—	—	—
2018–19	HPK	Liiga	8	0	0	0	12	18	6	1	7	4
2019–20	HPK	Liiga	48	4	8	12	8	—	—	—	—	—
2020–21	Gladiators HT	II-divisioona	4	4	6	10	2	—	—	—	—	—
2020–21	Jokipojat	Mestis	4	1	2	3	2	—	—	—	—	—
2020–21	HK Poprad	Slovak	28	6	6	12	2	14	3	2	5	2
Liiga totals			577	103	138	241	86	65	16	14	30	16

=== International ===
Year	Team	Event	Result	GP	G	A	Pts	PIM
