= Ville-Vesa Vainiola =

Finnish ice hockey player

- Born: April 2, 1985 (age 39); Rauma, Finland
- Height: 6 ft 2 in (188 cm)
- Weight: 192 lb (87 kg; 13 st 10 lb)
- Position: Centre
- Shot: Left
- Played for: Lukko; HC TPS; IK Oskarshamn; FPS; Hokki; KooKoo; TUTO Hockey; Tappara; LeKi; KalPa
- Playing career: 2005–2019

Ville-Vesa Vainiola (born April 2, 1985) is a Finnish former professional ice hockey player who played with Lukko in the SM-liiga for three seasons from 2005–06 to 2007–08.

== Career statistics ==
			Regular season					Playoffs
Season	Team	League	GP	G	A	Pts	PIM	GP	G	A	Pts	PIM
2000–01	Lukko U16	U16 SM-sarja	14	9	16	25	2	2	1	0	1	2
2001–02	Lukko U18	U18 SM-sarja	22	6	19	25	2	—	—	—	—	—
2001–02	Lukko U20	U20 SM-liiga	4	0	0	0	0	—	—	—	—	—
2002–03	Lukko U20	U20 SM-liiga	34	2	11	13	6	—	—	—	—	—
2003–04	Lukko U20	U20 SM-liiga	41	11	27	38	28	—	—	—	—	—
2003–04	Suomi U20	Mestis	3	0	0	0	0	—	—	—	—	—
2004–05	Lukko U20	U20 SM-liiga	39	21	41	62	14	—	—	—	—	—
2005–06	Lukko U20	U20 SM-liiga	15	3	20	23	8	9	1	8	9	6
2005–06	Lukko	SM-liiga	49	1	4	5	14	—	—	—	—	—
2006–07	Lukko	SM-liiga	45	3	3	6	10	3	0	0	0	0
2006–07	FPS	Mestis	2	0	0	0	0	—	—	—	—	—
2006–07	Hokki	Mestis	3	1	1	2	2	—	—	—	—	—
2007–08	Lukko	SM-liiga	47	2	4	6	10	3	0	0	0	0
2008–09	IK Oskarshamn	HockeyAllsvenskan	44	7	21	28	30	—	—	—	—	—
2009–10	KooKoo	Mestis	36	18	22	40	12	10	7	6	13	8
2010–11	KooKoo	Mestis	42	16	18	34	20	8	1	4	5	2
2011–12	TUTO Hockey	Mestis	45	15	28	43	22	4	1	2	3	2
2012–13	TUTO Hockey	Mestis	45	14	32	46	12	11	4	8	12	6
2013–14	TUTO Hockey	Mestis	47	20	19	39	14	13	4	6	10	10
2014–15	Tappara	Liiga	2	0	0	0	0	—	—	—	—	—
2014–15	LeKi	Mestis	24	6	10	16	18	—	—	—	—	—
2014–15	HC TPS	Liiga	16	5	4	9	2	—	—	—	—	—
2015–16	HC TPS	Liiga	57	3	11	14	22	8	0	4	4	4
2016–17	KalPa	Liiga	4	0	0	0	2	—	—	—	—	—
2017–18	KalPa	Liiga	60	3	9	12	10	6	0	0	0	4
2018–19	KalPa	Liiga	42	3	6	9	16	—	—	—	—	—
SM-liiga totals			322	20	41	61	86	20	0	4	4	8
Mestis totals			247	90	130	220	100	46	17	26	43	28
