= Mikko Kalteva =

Finnish ice hockey player (born 1984)

- Born: 25 May 1984 (age 41) Hyvinkää, Finland
- Height: 6 ft 3.5 in (192 cm)
- Weight: 211 lb (96 kg; 15 st 1 lb)
- Position: Defense
- Shot: Left
- Played for: Jokerit; Södertälje SK; JYP Jyväskylä
- NHL draft: 107th overall, 2002; Colorado Avalanche
- Playing career: 2004–2021

Mikko Kalteva (born 25 May 1984) is a Finnish former professional ice hockey defenseman who most notably played in the Finnish Liiga.

== Playing career ==
Kalteva was drafted 107th overall in the 2002 NHL entry draft by the Colorado Avalanche. Kalteva joined Jokerit as a 16-year-old junior and played in the Junior A SM-liiga in 2000–01 earning a place in the Pohjola First All-Star Team. Kalteva gained the notice of the Avalanche after selection to the Finnish Jr. team for the World U18 Championships in 2002. Kalteva was also named in the Finnish World Junior Championships in 2003 and 2004, earning a bronze medal on each occasion.

At the end of the 2003–04 season, Kalteva made his SM-liiga debut with Jokerit. In the following season Kalteva was a part of the fringe squad that helped Jokerit take the silver medal in the Kanada-malja playoffs. Mikko became a dual winner of the silver medal when he played a prominent defensive role in 2006–07.

On 23 April 2010, after spending his entire career to date with Jokerit, Kalteva left when he signed with Swedish team, Södertälje SK, of the Elitserien for the 2010–11 season.

Upon the completion of his second season with Södertälje, Kalteva returned to Finland signing a one-year contract with JYP Jyväskylä on 30 June 2012.

Kalteva played nine seasons with JYP Jyväskylä, making a total of 709 Liiga appearances before ending his 18-year professional career following the 2020–21 season, announcing his retirement on 31 March 2021.

== Career statistics ==
=== Regular season and playoffs ===
			Regular season					Playoffs
Season	Team	League	GP	G	A	Pts	PIM	GP	G	A	Pts	PIM
2000–01	Jokerit	FIN U18	11	1	4	5	6	6	3	1	4	2
2000–01	Jokerit	FIN U20	34	0	3	3	12	—	—	—	—	—
2001–02	Jokerit	FIN U20	29	5	3	8	10	—	—	—	—	—
2001–02	Jokerit	FIN U18	—	—	—	—	—	6	3	1	4	2
2002–03	Jokerit	FIN U20	34	7	8	15	30	10	2	4	6	4
2003–04	Jokerit	FIN U20	39	14	10	24	42	3	0	0	0	0
2003–04	Jokerit	SM-liiga	2	0	0	0	0	8	0	0	0	2
2003–04	Suomi U20	Mestis	9	0	1	1	2	—	—	—	—	—
2004–05	Jokerit	FIN U20	24	2	9	11	40	—	—	—	—	—
2004–05	Jokerit	SM-liiga	2	0	0	0	0	2	0	0	0	0
2005–06	Jokerit	SM-liiga	53	2	1	3	26	—	—	—	—	—
2006–07	Jokerit	SM-liiga	54	3	6	9	34	6	0	0	0	0
2007–08	Jokerit	SM-liiga	54	2	7	9	40	14	1	2	3	4
2008–09	Jokerit	SM-liiga	56	0	7	7	34	5	0	0	0	4
2009–10	Jokerit	SM-liiga	33	0	6	6	16	3	0	1	1	4
2010–11	Södertälje SK	SEL	46	2	5	7	24	—	—	—	—	—
2011–12	Södertälje SK	Allsv	44	1	6	7	24	—	—	—	—	—
2012–13	JYP	SM-liiga	45	5	9	14	40	8	0	6	6	8
2013–14	JYP	Liiga	31	1	6	7	18	—	—	—	—	—
2014–15	JYP	Liiga	48	3	10	13	20	12	2	3	5	2
2015–16	JYP	Liiga	58	10	19	29	26	13	2	4	6	6
2016–17	JYP	Liiga	58	4	26	30	20	12	1	4	5	8
2017–18	JYP	Liiga	53	9	16	25	26	6	1	0	1	2
2018–19	JYP	Liiga	57	1	17	18	32	3	0	2	2	2
2019–20	JYP	Liiga	56	5	13	18	30	—	—	—	—	—
2020–21	JYP	Liiga	49	1	7	8	26	—	—	—	—	—
Liiga totals			709	46	150	196	388	92	7	22	29	42

Medal record

Representing Finland

Ice hockey

World Junior Championships
Bronze medal – third place	2003 Halifax	
Bronze medal – third place	2004 Helsinki	

=== International ===
Year	Team	Event	Result	GP	G	A	Pts	PIM
2002	Finland	WJC18	4th	7	0	0	0	6
2003	Finland	WJC	3rd place, bronze medalist(s)	7	0	1	1	4
2004	Finland	WJC	3rd place, bronze medalist(s)	7	0	1	1	0
Junior totals				21	0	2	2	10
