= Tommi Taimi =

Finnish ice hockey player

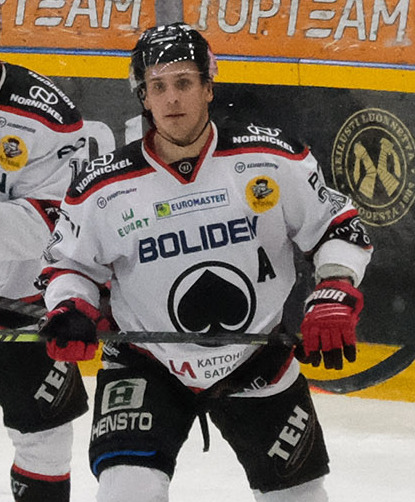
- Born: 21 September 1990 (age 36) Pori, Finland
- Height: 5 ft 11 in (180 cm)
- Weight: 190 lb (86 kg; 13 st 8 lb)
- Position: Defence
- Shoots: Right
- EHL team Former teams: Vålerenga Ishockey; Ässät; Amur Khabarovsk; HIFK; Kunlun Red Star; Slovan Bratislava
- Playing career: 2010–present

Tommi Sakari Taimi (born 21 September 1990) is a Finnish professional ice hockey defenceman for Vålerenga Ishockey of EliteHockey Ligaen.

== Playing career ==
Having come through the youth ranks of Ässät, Tommi Taimi played his first SM-liiga game for the club on 16 September 2011 against Lukko, where he recorded his first assist. He scored his first goal on 24 September 2011 against HPK.

In 2014, he took his game abroad, signing with Amur Khabarovsk of the Kontinental Hockey League (KHL), where he spent one year. Back in his native Finland, Taimi strengthened the roster of Liiga side HIFK during the 2015–16 season and in the early stages of the 2016–17 campaign. In November 2016, he accepted an offer from Kunlun Red Star, the Chinese member of the Kontinental Hockey League.

In the 2017–18 season, Taimi began his third KHL campaign with Slovak-based, Slovan Bratislava. Appearing in just 13 games, Taimi registered 1 assist before opting to return mid-season to his native Finland and joining original club, Ässät, on a multi-year contract on 5 January 2018.

Sporting positions
Preceded by Matti Kuparinen	Porin Ässät captain 2018–19	Succeeded by Niklas Appelgren
