= Juha Leimu =

Finnish ice hockey player

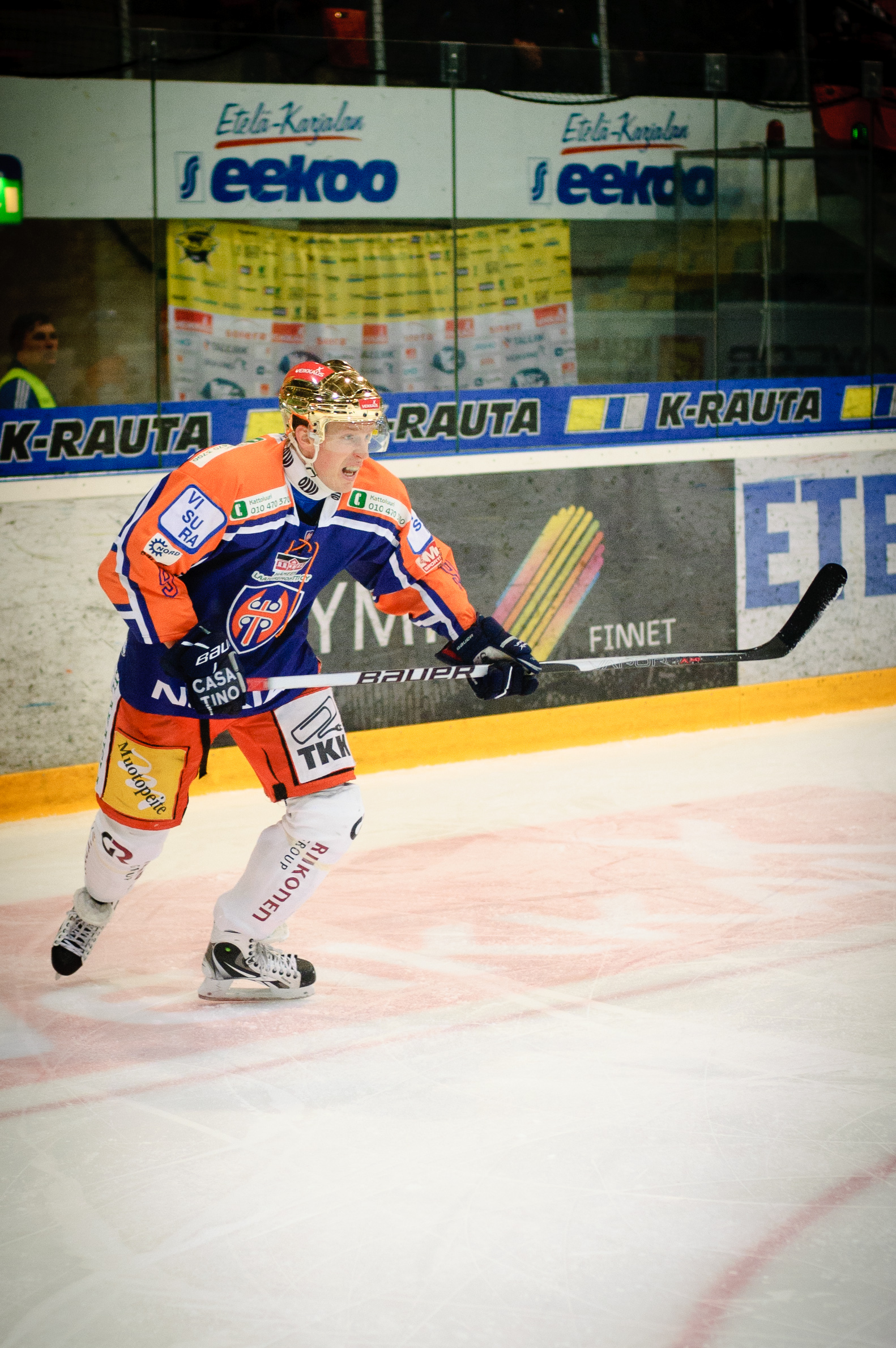
- Born: January 30, 1983 (age 43) Tampere, Finland
- Height: 6 ft 1 in (185 cm)
- Weight: 190 lb (86 kg; 13 st 8 lb)
- Position: Defence
- Shot: Left
- Played for: Tappara; Pelicans; Ilves
- National team: Finland
- NHL draft: undrafted
- Playing career: 2003–2019

Juha Leimu (born January 30, 1983, in Tampere, Finland) is a retired Finnish professional ice hockey defenceman.

== Playing career ==
Leimu broke into the SM-liiga during the 2009–10 season, joining Tappara on an eight-game trial after starting the year with Lempäälän Kisa. His strong play earned him a contract for the remainder of the season, where he tallied 24 points in 36 games. In May 2010, he signed a three-year extension with the team. The following season, 2010–11, he posted his best career numbers, scoring 12 goals and adding 31 points in 50 games.

Following the end of his contract with Tappara, Leimu signed a two-year deal with the Pelicans on April 26, 2013. In his first season with Lahti, he led all Pelicans defensemen in goals, scoring 10. During the 2013–14 playoffs, Leimu netted the overtime winner in Game 2, securing a first-round series victory over HIFK.

Ahead of the 2014–15 season, Leimu was appointed as the team's captain. Throughout the season, he missed several stretches of play because of injuries but still managed to tally 16 points over 40 games. On November 20, 2014, he agreed to a two-year contract extension with the Pelicans.

Leimu set a Liiga record for the quickest hat-trick, netting three power-play goals in only 44 seconds during a 5–6 overtime defeat to JYP Jyväskylä on December 15, 2015. That same season, he led all defensemen in the league with 16 goals.

In 2011, Juha Leimu earned the opportunity to represent the Finland national team, appearing in an international exhibition game against Slovakia.

== Career statistics ==
			Regular season					Playoffs
Season	Team	League	GP	G	A	Pts	PIM	GP	G	A	Pts	PIM
1998–99	Ilves U16	U16 SM-sarja	29	28	22	50	18	3	1	0	1	0
1999–00	Ilves U18	U18 SM-sarja	24	5	4	9	2	—	—	—	—	—
2000–01	Ilves U18	U18 SM-sarja	36	17	21	38	26	—	—	—	—	—
2001–02	Ilves U20	U20 SM-liiga	15	7	3	10	4	—	—	—	—	—
2002–03	Ilves U20	U20 SM-liiga	4	3	0	3	0	—	—	—	—	—
2003–04	Ilves U20	U20 SM-liiga	37	15	12	27	14	—	—	—	—	—
2004–05	Koovee	Suomi-sarja	19	7	4	11	10	—	—	—	—	—
2005–06	Koovee	Suomi-sarja	27	9	7	16	12	9	1	1	2	12
2006–07	LeKi	Suomi-sarja	34	18	31	49	44	6	8	2	10	6
2007–08	LeKi	Mestis	43	9	9	18	40	3	0	1	1	2
2008–09	LeKi	Mestis	42	13	16	29	44	3	0	2	2	6
2009–10	LeKi	Mestis	13	4	7	11	10	—	—	—	—	—
2009–10	Tappara	SM-liiga	36	7	17	24	16	7	3	2	5	2
2010–11	Tappara	SM-liiga	50	12	19	31	40	—	—	—	—	—
2011–12	Tappara	SM-liiga	24	2	2	4	20	—	—	—	—	—
2011–12	LeKi	Mestis	1	0	0	0	0	—	—	—	—	—
2012–13	Tappara	SM-liiga	57	7	15	22	55	15	1	1	2	6
2013–14	Lahti Pelicans	Liiga	48	10	10	20	32	8	2	1	3	8
2014–15	Lahti Pelicans	Liiga	40	6	10	16	34	—	—	—	—	—
2015–16	Lahti Pelicans	Liiga	51	16	18	34	12	9	3	2	5	0
2016–17	Lahti Pelicans	Liiga	31	11	6	17	4	5	0	2	2	2
2017–18	Lahti Pelicans	Liiga	43	2	8	10	28	3	1	2	3	2
2018–19	Ilves	Liiga	38	2	7	9	22	4	0	0	0	0
Liiga totals			418	75	112	187	263	51	10	10	20	20
