= Vili Sopanen =

Finnish ice hockey player

- Born: October 21, 1987 (age 38) Valkeala, Finland
- Height: 6 ft 3 in (191 cm)
- Weight: 209 lb (95 kg; 14 st 13 lb)
- Position: Right wing
- Shot: Right
- Played for: Lahti Pelicans; JYP Jyväskylä; Luleå HF; HIFK; ERC Ingolstadt; Schwenninger Wild Wings; Lukko
- NHL draft: 177th overall, 2007; New Jersey Devils
- Playing career: 2006–2020

Vili Sopanen (born October 21, 1987) is a Finnish former professional ice hockey player. He last played for Lukko in the Liiga. He was drafted by the New Jersey Devils, 177th overall, in the 2007 NHL entry draft. Sopanen has previously played in the top tier Finnish Liiga with Lahti Pelicans, JYP Jyväskylä and HIFK.

== Playing career ==
On June 11, 2018, Sopanen left his native Finland for the second time through his 12-year professional career, agreeing to a one-year deal with German outfit, ERC Ingolstadt of the DEL. During the 2018–19 season, Sopanen played in 14 games with Ingolstadt before transferring to Schwenninger Wild Wings. Sopanen played a further 17 games for 7 points in the DEL before leaving to return to his native Finland, agreeing to an optional three-year deal with Lukko of the Liiga on February 3, 2019.

== Career statistics ==
=== Regular season and playoffs ===
| | | | Regular season | | | | | Playoffs |
| Season | Team | League | GP | G | A | Pts | PIM | GP | G | A | Pts | PIM |
|---|---|---|---|---|---|---|---|---|---|---|---|---|
| 2003–04 | Pelicans | FIN U18 | 20 | 1 | 2 | 3 | 14 | — | — | — | — | — |
| 2004–05 | Pelicans | FIN U18 | 25 | 11 | 15 | 26 | 4 | 3 | 0 | 2 | 2 | 22 |
| 2005–06 | Pelicans | FIN U20 | 37 | 14 | 17 | 31 | 22 | — | — | — | — | — |
| 2005–06 | Pelicans | SM-l | 3 | 0 | 0 | 0 | 0 | — | — | — | — | — |
| 2006–07 | Pelicans | FIN U20 | 33 | 18 | 21 | 39 | 40 | 15 | 5 | 13 | 18 | 18 |
| 2006–07 | Pelicans | SM-l | 7 | 1 | 0 | 1 | 0 | — | — | — | — | — |
| 2006–07 | Suomi U20 | FIN.2 | 6 | 1 | 1 | 2 | 4 | — | — | — | — | — |
| 2007–08 | Pelicans | FIN U20 | 2 | 1 | 1 | 2 | 0 | — | — | — | — | — |
| 2007–08 | Pelicans | SM-l | 54 | 15 | 15 | 30 | 8 | 6 | 0 | 4 | 4 | 2 |
| 2008–09 | Pelicans | SM-l | 58 | 12 | 17 | 29 | 34 | 10 | 1 | 1 | 2 | 6 |
| 2009–10 | Pelicans | SM-l | 52 | 21 | 16 | 37 | 20 | — | — | — | — | — |
| 2009–10 | HeKi | FIN.2 | 1 | 0 | 1 | 1 | 2 | — | — | — | — | — |
| 2010–11 | JYP | SM-l | 35 | 5 | 11 | 16 | 10 | — | — | — | — | — |
| 2010–11 | D Team | FIN.2 | 1 | 1 | 0 | 1 | 0 | — | — | — | — | — |
| 2010–11 | Luleå HF | SEL | 5 | 1 | 0 | 1 | 0 | — | — | — | — | — |
| 2010–11 | Pelicans | SM-l | 14 | 5 | 8 | 13 | 20 | — | — | — | — | — |
| 2011–12 | Pelicans | SM-l | 54 | 21 | 18 | 39 | 8 | 10 | 3 | 3 | 6 | 6 |
| 2012–13 | Pelicans | SM-l | 33 | 3 | 15 | 18 | 12 | — | — | — | — | — |
| 2012–13 | Peliitat | FIN.2 | 2 | 0 | 1 | 1 | 0 | — | — | — | — | — |
| 2013–14 | Pelicans | Liiga | 56 | 12 | 30 | 42 | 28 | 8 | 1 | 1 | 2 | 0 |
| 2014–15 | Pelicans | Liiga | 23 | 4 | 7 | 11 | 45 | — | — | — | — | — |
| 2015–16 | Pelicans | Liiga | 34 | 9 | 20 | 29 | 33 | 9 | 1 | 5 | 6 | 4 |
| 2015–16 | Peliitat | FIN.2 | 2 | 1 | 1 | 2 | 0 | — | — | — | — | — |
| 2016–17 | Pelicans | Liiga | 41 | 20 | 26 | 46 | 8 | 5 | 1 | 2 | 3 | 0 |
| 2017–18 | HIFK | Liiga | 49 | 14 | 22 | 36 | 18 | 11 | 1 | 3 | 4 | 14 |
| 2018–19 | ERC Ingolstadt | DEL | 14 | 2 | 4 | 6 | 4 | — | — | — | — | — |
| 2018–19 | Schwenninger Wild Wings | DEL | 17 | 3 | 4 | 7 | 10 | — | — | — | — | — |
| 2018–19 | Lukko | Liiga | 13 | 5 | 4 | 9 | 16 | 7 | 0 | 2 | 2 | 2 |
| 2019–20 | Lukko | Liiga | 21 | 2 | 4 | 6 | 2 | — | — | — | — | — |
| 2023–24 | Peliitat | FIN.4 | 2 | 1 | 7 | 8 | 0 | 1 | 0 | 3 | 3 | 0 |
| 2024–25 | Peliitat | FIN.4 | 11 | 8 | 13 | 21 | 4 | 5 | 4 | 3 | 7 | 27 |
| 2025–26 | Peliitat | FIN.4 | 2 | 1 | 4 | 5 | 0 | 7 | 1 | 10 | 11 | 2 |
| Liiga totals | | | 547 | 149 | 213 | 362 | 262 | 66 | 8 | 21 | 29 | 34 |

=== International ===
| Year | Team | Event | GP | G | A | Pts | PIM |
|---|---|---|---|---|---|---|---|
| 2007 | Finland | WJC | 6 | 0 | 0 | 0 | 4 |
| Junior totals | | | 6 | 0 | 0 | 0 | 4 |
