= Valtteri Hietanen =

Finnish ice hockey player

- Born: 23 December 1992 (age 33) Virrat, Finland
- Height: 6 ft 1 in (185 cm)
- Weight: 212 lb (96 kg; 15 st 2 lb)
- Position: Defence
- Shot: Left
- Played for: JYP; Jukurit; Neman Grodno; Vaasan Sport
- NHL draft: Undrafted
- Playing career: 2011–2026

Valtteri Hietanen (born 23 December 1992) is a Finnish former professional ice hockey defenceman.

Hietanen made his Liiga debut playing with JYP during the 2012–13 SM-liiga season.

== Career statistics ==
=== Regular season and playoffs ===
			Regular season					Playoffs
Season	Team	League	GP	G	A	Pts	PIM	GP	G	A	Pts	PIM
2011–12	JYP-Akatemia	Mestis	42	3	4	7	20	—	—	—	—	—
2012–13	JYP-Akatemia	Mestis	44	2	3	5	20	—	—	—	—	—
2012–13	JYP	SM-l	5	0	0	0	0	—	—	—	—	—
2013–14	JYP	Liiga	52	1	4	5	4	7	0	2	2	6
2013–14	JYP-Akatemia	Mestis	3	0	0	0	0	—	—	—	—	—
2014–15	JYP	Liiga	54	1	7	8	10	—	—	—	—	—
2015–16	JYP-Akatemia	Mestis	8	0	6	6	2	—	—	—	—	—
2015–16	JYP	Liiga	51	1	6	7	12	13	0	2	2	4
2016–17	Jukurit	Liiga	59	0	8	8	40	—	—	—	—	—
2017–18	Jukurit	Liiga	49	0	8	8	59	—	—	—	—	—
2018–19	Jukurit	Liiga	39	0	4	4	20	—	—	—	—	—
2019–20	Neman Grodno	BHL	37	5	12	17	18	—	—	—	—	—
2020–21	Nikkō Ice Bucks	ALIH	19	2	11	13	10	—	—	—	—	—
2021–22	Vaasan Sport	Liiga	45	1	2	3	6	—	—	—	—	—
2022–23	Vaasan Sport	Liiga	55	2	5	7	47	—	—	—	—	—
2023–24	Vaasan Sport	Liiga	38	1	7	8	14	2	1	0	1	0
2024–25	Vaasan Sport	Liiga	53	0	6	6	34	8	0	0	0	2
2025–26	Vaasan Sport	Liiga	55	0	3	3	37	—	—	—	—	—
Liiga totals			555	7	60	67	283	30	1	4	5	12
BHL totals			37	5	12	17	18	—	—	—	—	—
