= Valtteri Hotakainen =

Finnish ice hockey player

- Born: April 24, 1990 (age 34); Kokkola, Finland
- Height: 6 ft 2 in (188 cm)
- Weight: 190 lb (86 kg; 13 st 8 lb)
- Position: Centre
- Shoots: Left
- Liiga team Former teams: Mikkelin Jukurit; JYP Jyväskylä; JYP-Akatemia

Valtteri Hotakainen (born April 24, 1990) is a Finnish ice hockey player who plays as a centre for Mikkelin Jukurit.

== Career statistics ==
			Regular season					Playoffs
Season	Team	League	GP	G	A	Pts	PIM	GP	G	A	Pts	PIM
2005–06	Kokkolan Hermes U16	U16 I-Divisioona Q	7	5	13	18	8	—	—	—	—	—
2005–06	Kokkolan Hermes U16	U16 I-Divisioona	12	8	5	13	16	—	—	—	—	—
2006–07	Kokkolan Hermes U18	U18 2. Divisioona	18	20	13	33	34	—	—	—	—	—
2006–07	Kokkolan Hermes	Suomi-sarja	2	0	0	0	0	—	—	—	—	—
2007–08	Kokkolan Hermes U18	U18 2. Divisioona	4	2	6	8	4	—	—	—	—	—
2007–08	Kokkolan Hermes	Suomi-sarja	31	7	9	16	26	—	—	—	—	—
2008–09	Kokkolan Hermes	2. Divisioona	—	—	—	—	—	—	—	—	—	—
2008–09	JHT Kalajoki	Suomi-sarja	20	8	8	16	10	—	—	—	—	—
2008–09	JYP Jyväskylä U20	U20 SM-liiga	3	0	0	0	4	—	—	—	—	—
2009–10	JYP Jyväskylä U20	U20 SM-liiga	6	0	0	0	0	—	—	—	—	—
2010–11	JYP Jyväskylä U20	U20 SM-liiga	27	4	9	13	48	—	—	—	—	—
2010–11	D Team	Mestis	13	2	0	2	2	8	3	0	3	2
2011–12	JYP-Akatemia	Mestis	44	4	9	13	24	—	—	—	—	—
2012–13	JYP-Akatemia	Mestis	34	3	7	10	18	—	—	—	—	—
2013–14	JYP-Akatemia	Mestis	50	17	14	31	24	—	—	—	—	—
2014–15	JYP-Akatemia	Mestis	41	12	17	29	20	—	—	—	—	—
2014–15	JYP Jyväskylä	Liiga	14	1	0	1	6	12	1	0	1	6
2015–16	JYP Jyväskylä	Liiga	54	7	11	18	12	10	0	2	2	8
2015–16	JYP-Akatemia	Mestis	1	0	0	0	0	—	—	—	—	—
2016–17	JYP Jyväskylä	Liiga	35	3	3	6	12	5	0	0	0	0
2016–17	JYP-Akatemia	Mestis	13	3	7	10	0	—	—	—	—	—
2017–18	JYP Jyväskylä	Liiga	14	0	2	2	10	—	—	—	—	—
2017–18	Mikkelin Jukurit	Liiga	37	1	2	3	14	—	—	—	—	—
2018–19	Mikkelin Jukurit	Liiga	35	5	4	9	22	—	—	—	—	—
2019–20	Mikkelin Jukurit	Liiga	40	2	6	8	26	—	—	—	—	—
2020–21	Saale Bulls Halle	Germany3	39	22	26	48	46	—	—	—	—	—
2021–22	Kokkolan Hermes	Mestis	33	8	4	12	22	2	0	0	0	2
Liiga totals			229	19	28	47	102	27	1	2	3	14
Mestis totals			229	49	58	107	110	10	3	0	3	4
