= Petri Mattila =

Finnish ice hockey coach (born 1970)

- Born: January 11, 1970 (age 56); Tampere, Finland
- Occupations: Head Coach, KooKoo

Petri Mattila (born January 11, 1970) is a Finnish ice hockey coach. He is currently the head coach of Asiago Hockey 1935.

In September 2010, three week before the start of the 2010–11 SM-liiga season, Mattila resigned as head coach of Tappara citing “personal reasons”.

== Awards and honours ==
| Award | Year |
|---|---|
| Mestis Coach of the Year | 2013–14 |
| Italian Hockey League Champion | 2019–20 |
