= Jani Forsström =

Finnish ice hockey player

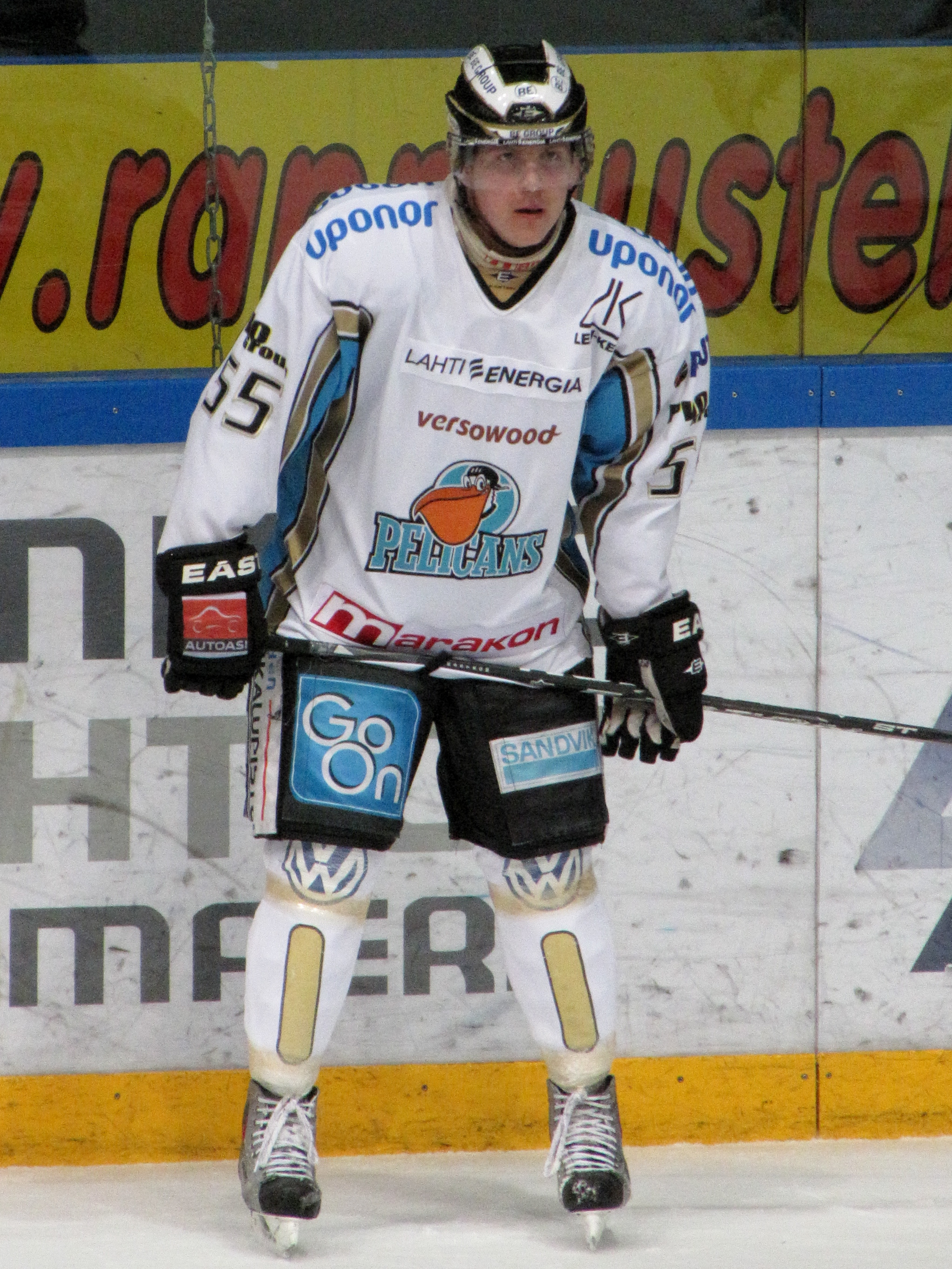
- Born: February 19, 1986 (age 39); Lahti, Finland
- Height: 6 ft 1 in (185 cm)
- Weight: 202 lb (92 kg; 14 st 6 lb)
- Position: Defence
- Shoots: Left
- Liiga team Former teams: TPS; Pelicans; HC Alleghe; HPK
- Playing career: 2004–present

Jani Forsström (born February 19, 1986) is a Finnish professional ice hockey defenceman who currently plays for TPS of the Liiga.

Forsström previously played in Liiga for Pelicans and HPK. He also played in Serie A for HC Alleghe.
