= Eero Kilpeläinen =

Finnish ice hockey player (born 1985)

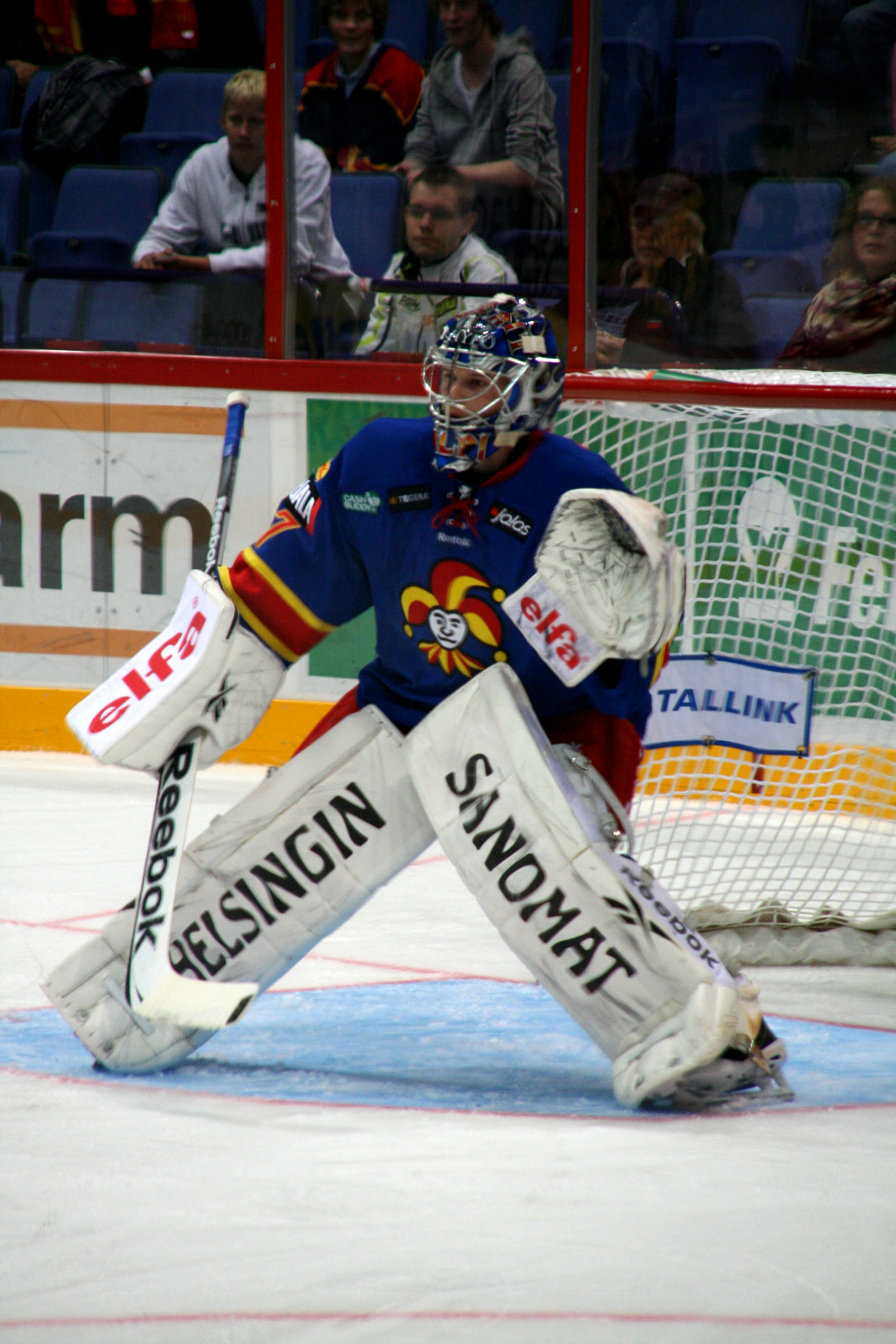
- Eero Kilpeläinen with Jokerit Helsinki
- Born: May 7, 1985 (age 41) Juva, Finland
- Height: 6 ft 0 in (183 cm)
- Weight: 172 lb (78 kg; 12 st 4 lb)
- Position: Goaltender
- Caught: Left
- Played for: Porin Ässät; Helsingin Jokerit; EV Zug; Örebro HK; KalPa
- NHL draft: 144th overall, 2003; Dallas Stars
- Playing career: 2005–2022

Eero Kilpeläinen (born May 7, 1985) is a Finnish former professional ice hockey goaltender who last played for KalPa in the SM-liiga. He was selected by the Dallas Stars in the 5th round (144th overall) of the 2003 NHL entry draft.

Kilpeläinen leads the SM-liiga in played games (519) and shutouts (56). His number, 37, is retired by KalPa.

== Career ==
Kilpeläinen started his hockey career with his hometown club Juvan Pallo's juniors, but moved to the Jukurit juniors before finally joining the KalPa juniors in 2001. He played one Mestis game for KalPa in the 2002–03 season. He joined the Peterborough Petes of the OHL for the 2004–05 season.

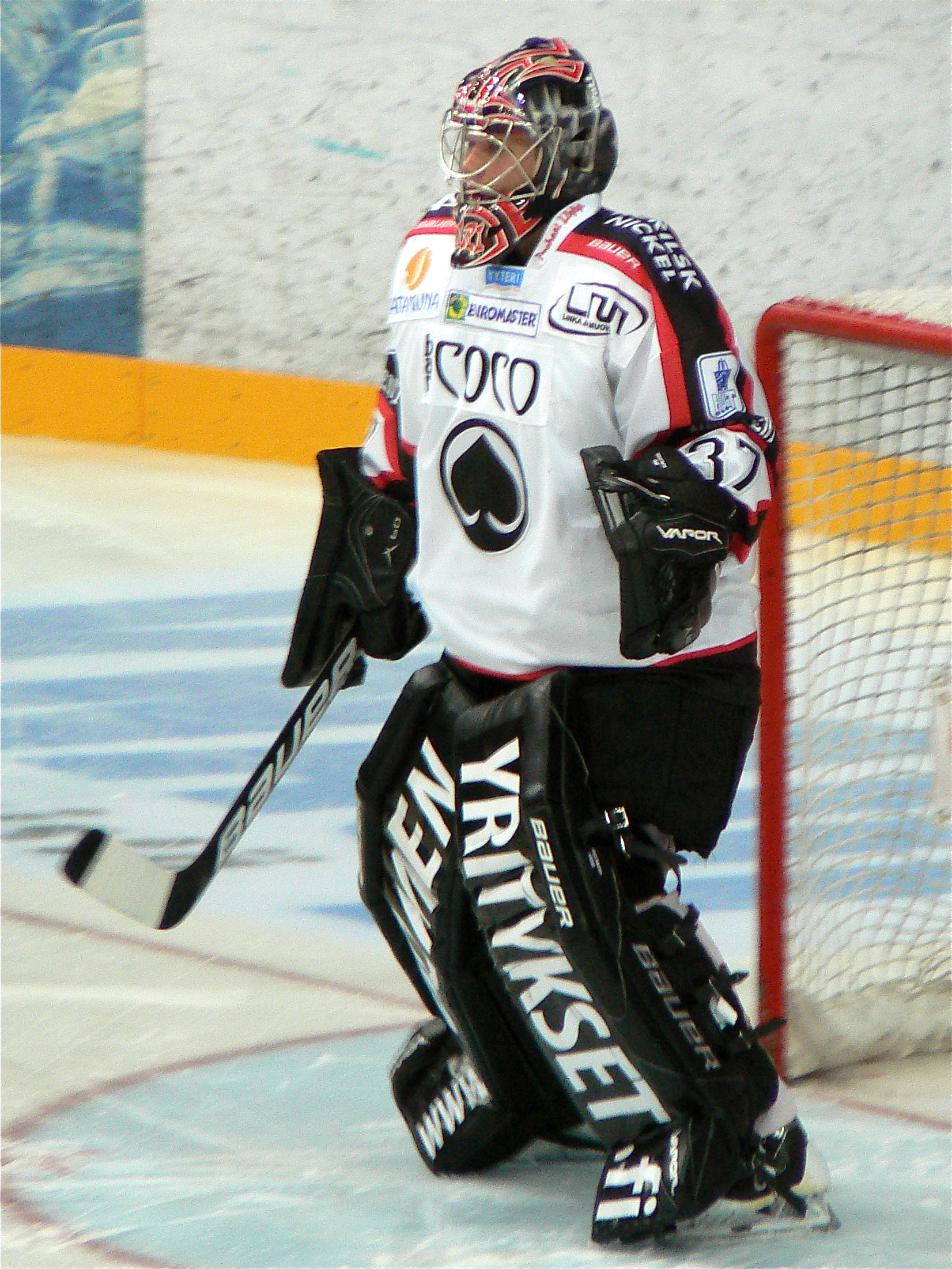
Kilpeläinen with the Porin Ässät in a SM-liiga matchup in September 2009

Kilpeläinen joined the Porin Ässät of the SM-liiga for the 2005–06 season, but he got sent down to the Mestis with Hermes Kokkola, playing 38 games with a save percentage of .912. For the 2006–07 season, he got the role of the starting goaltender with the Porin Ässät. He played 36 games with a save percentage of .907 and a goals against average of 3.27. In the 2008–09 season, Ässät finished 12th in the SM-liiga, and had to play the playouts to keep their spot in the league. Kilpeläinen played 10 playout matches with a save percentage of .938 and GAA of 2.69, keeping Ässät in the SM-liiga after beating Vaasan Sport in game seven of the relegation series.

He joined the SM-liiga team Jokerit Helsinki for the 2011–12 season.

After playing the 2013–14 season in Switzerland with EV Zug of the National League A, He returned to Finland, signing an optional four-year contract with his youth club, KalPa, on March 27, 2014.

In the 2016–17 season, Kilpeläinen won SM-liiga silver with KalPa. He was chosen into the All-Star team and he won the Urpo Ylönen trophy, which is awarded for the best SM-liiga goalie each year.

Kilpeläinen played the years 2017–2019 in the SHL with Örebro HK. Kilpeläinen returned to KalPa in 2019.

Kilpeläinen retired in 2022, leading the SM-liiga in career games played (519) and shutouts (56). His number was retired by KalPa in 2023.
