= Tomi Karhunen =

Finnish ice hockey player (born 1989)

- Born: 29 October 1989 (age 36) Oulu, Finland
- Height: 5 ft 10 in (178 cm)
- Weight: 172 lb (78 kg; 12 st 4 lb)
- Position: Goaltender
- Catches: Left
- Liiga team Former teams: HPK; Oulun Kärpät; RoKi; Kiekko-Laser; Hokki; HC Slovan Bratislava; Tappara; Kunlun Red Star; HC Vityaz; HC Ambrì-Piotta; Brynäs IF; Lahti Pelicans; Straubing Tigers; EC VSV; HIFK
- NHL draft: Undrafted
- Playing career: 2009–present

Tomi Karhunen (born 29 October 1989) is a Finnish professional ice hockey goaltender who currently plays for Hämeenlinnan Pallokerho of the Finnish Liiga. He is also an owner of JoKP of Mestis.

== Playing career ==
Karhunen made his SM-liiga debut playing with Oulun Kärpät during the 2010–11 SM-liiga season. At the end of the 2011–12 campaign, he joined HC Slovan Bratislava on loan, helping the team capture the Slovak championship. He won the Finnish SM-liiga title with Kärpät in 2014 and 2015.

In summer 2015, he was transferred to fellow SM-liiga team Tappara and won his third straight championship during the 2015–16 season.

He signed with newly founded KHL side Kunlun Red Star from China in July 2016. Seeing limited ice time due competition with Swedish national team goalie Magnus Hellberg, he signed with HC Vityaz Podolsk for the remaining of the 2017–18 season.

Karhunen made 12 appearances with Brynäs IF in the Swedish Hockey League to start the 2018–19 season, posting an impressive 2.27 goals against average before opting to return for a second stint with Kunlun Red Star of the KHL on 4 December 2018.
