= Joonas Hurri =

Finnish ice hockey player

- Born: 31 March 1991 (age 33); Lahti, Finland
- Height: 5 ft 11 in (180 cm)
- Weight: 174 lb (79 kg; 12 st 6 lb)
- Position: Defence
- Shoots: Left
- BXL team Former teams: HK Neman Grodno; Lahti Pelicans; Asplöven HC; KRS Heilongjiang; Nikkō Ice Bucks; Rungsted Seier Capital
- Playing career: 2010–present

Joonas Hurri (born 31 March 1991) is a Finnish professional ice hockey defenceman who currently plays for HK Neman Grodno in the Belarusian Extraleague (BXL).

== Playing career ==
Hurri has also played on Peliitat, HeKi and on various Kiekko-Reipas teams. He made appearances at the 2008 World Hockey Challenge U-17 tournament (which took place between 29 December 2007 and 4 January 2008) and also at the 2009 IIHF World U18 Championships (which took place from 9 to 19 April 2009). Other leagues that Hurri has been involved with were the Jr. A SM-liiga, in addition to the Jr. B SM-sarja and Jr. C SM-sarja Q leagues. One of his first honors in his hockey career was being on the camp roster for Kiekko-Reipas at the U16 Pohjola league in May 2006. Hurri's amateur hockey career has seen him enter the playoffs once with the Pelicans U20 squad and relegated twice with the same squadron.

His current contract with the Pelicans is in good standing through the 2012–13 SM-liiga season. In 2018 Hurri made an agreement with the Nikkō Ice Bucks, and plays in the Asian Ice Hockey League.

== Career statistics ==
=== Regular season and playoffs ===
| | | | Regular season | | | | | Playoffs |
| Season | Team | League | GP | G | A | Pts | PIM | GP | G | A | Pts | PIM |
|---|---|---|---|---|---|---|---|---|---|---|---|---|
| 2009–10 | HeKi | Fin.1 | 12 | 1 | 2 | 3 | 0 | — | — | — | — | — |
| 2010–11 | Pelicans | SM-l | 28 | 1 | 2 | 3 | 6 | — | — | — | — | — |
| 2010–11 | HeKi | Fin.1 | 6 | 1 | 1 | 2 | 0 | — | — | — | — | — |
| 2011–12 | Pelicans | SM-l | 13 | 1 | 0 | 1 | 8 | 2 | 0 | 0 | 0 | 0 |
| 2011–12 | Peliitat | Fin.1 | 21 | 1 | 1 | 2 | 0 | — | — | — | — | — |
| SM-liiga totals | | | 41 | 2 | 2 | 4 | 14 | 2 | 0 | 0 | 0 | 0 |

Medal record

Representing Finland

Ice hockey

IIHF World U18 Championships
| Bronze medal – third place | 2009 United States | |

=== International ===
| Year | Team | Event | GP | G | A | Pts | PIM |
|---|---|---|---|---|---|---|---|
| 2008 | Finland | U17 | 5 | 0 | 0 | 0 | 0 |
| 2009 | Finland | WJC18 | 6 | 0 | 0 | 0 | 4 |
| Junior int'l totals | | | 11 | 0 | 0 | 0 | 4 |
