= Mika Partanen =

Finnish ice hockey player

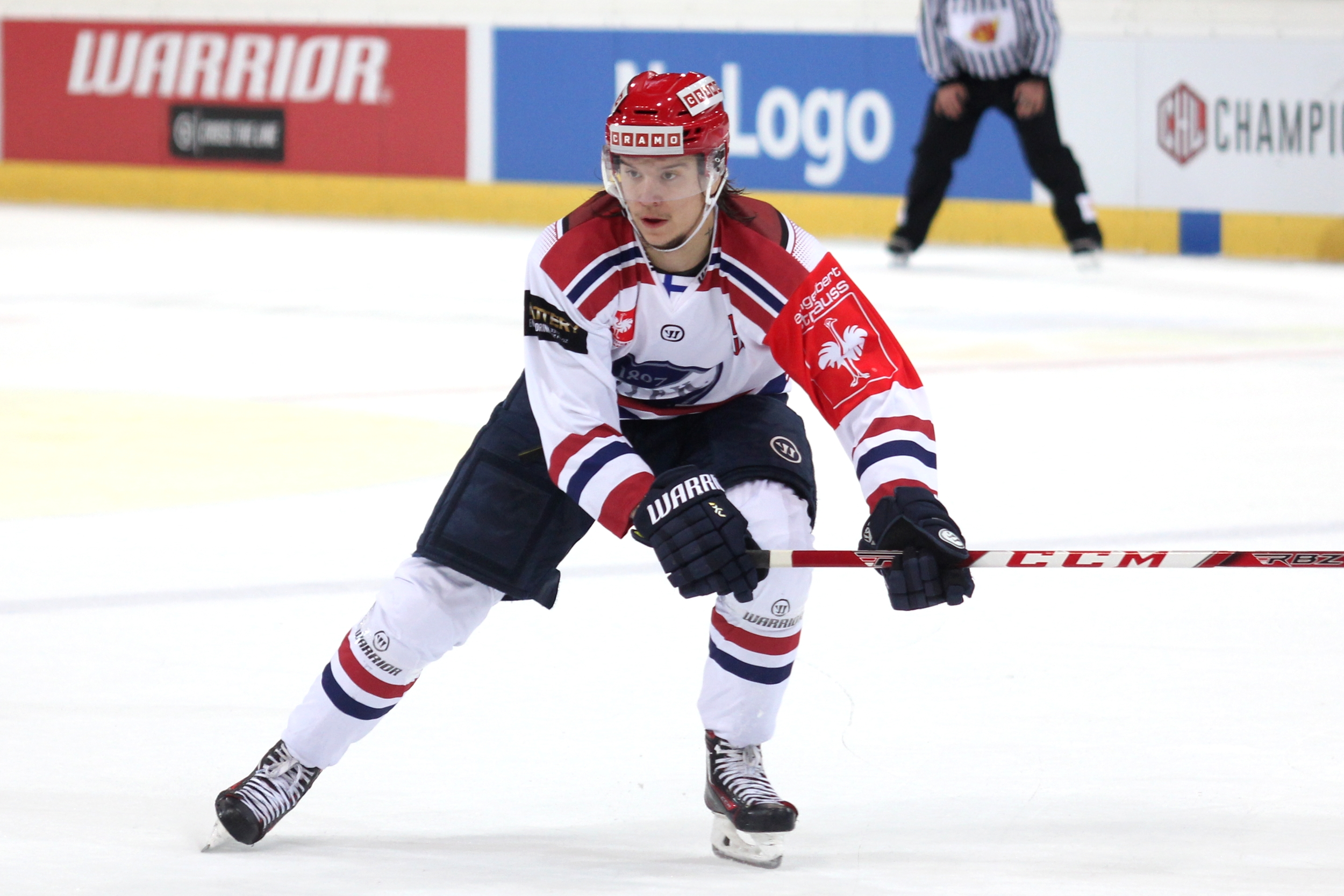
- Born: October 18, 1992 (age 33) Helsinki, Finland
- Height: 6 ft 2 in (188 cm)
- Weight: 205 lb (93 kg; 14 st 9 lb)
- Position: Forward
- Shoots: Left
- EIHL team: Fife Flyers
- NHL draft: Undrafted
- Playing career: 2012–present

Mika Partanen (born October 18, 1992) is a Finnish ice hockey player. He is currently playing with Fife Flyers in the British Elite Ice Hockey League (EIHL).

Partanen made his Liiga debut playing with HIFK during the 2013–14 Liiga season.
