= Mikko Salmio =

Finnish ice hockey player

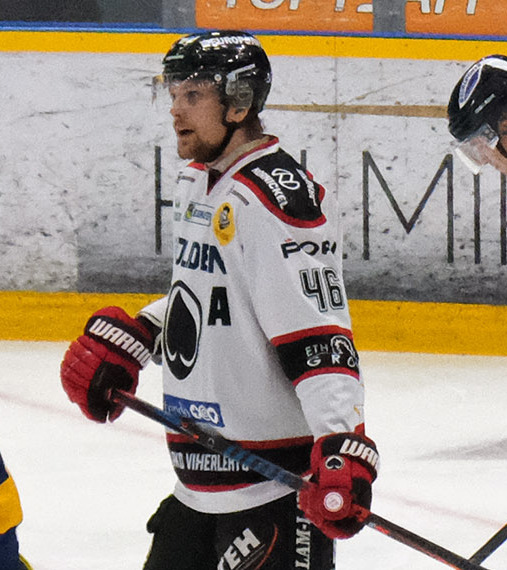
- Born: July 13, 1991 (age 34) Jämsä, Finland
- Height: 6 ft 4 in (193 cm)
- Weight: 185 lb (84 kg; 13 st 3 lb)
- Position: Right wing
- Shoots: Left
- Liiga team Former teams: Ässät; JYP Jyväskylä
- NHL draft: Undrafted
- Playing career: 2012–present

Mikko Salmio (born July 13, 1991) is a Finnish professional ice hockey player. He is currently playing for Berani Zlín of the Chance liga.

Salmio made his SM-liiga debut playing with JYP Jyväskylä during the 2012–13 SM-liiga season.
