= Juhani Jasu =

Finnish ice hockey player

- Born: 19 January 1988 (age 38) Eurajoki, Finland
- Height: 6 ft 0 in (183 cm)
- Weight: 194 lb (88 kg; 13 st 12 lb)
- Position: Forward
- Shot: Right
- Played for: Lukko; HPK; Tappara; HC TPS; HIFK
- Playing career: 2007–2026

Juhani Jasu (born 19 January 1988) is a Finnish former ice hockey forward who last played professionally in Finland for HIFK of the Liiga. He has previously played in the Liiga with Lukko, HPK, Tappara and HC TPS.

Jasu was forced to retire in 2026 as a result of injury.
