= Kalle Kaijomaa =

Finnish ice hockey player

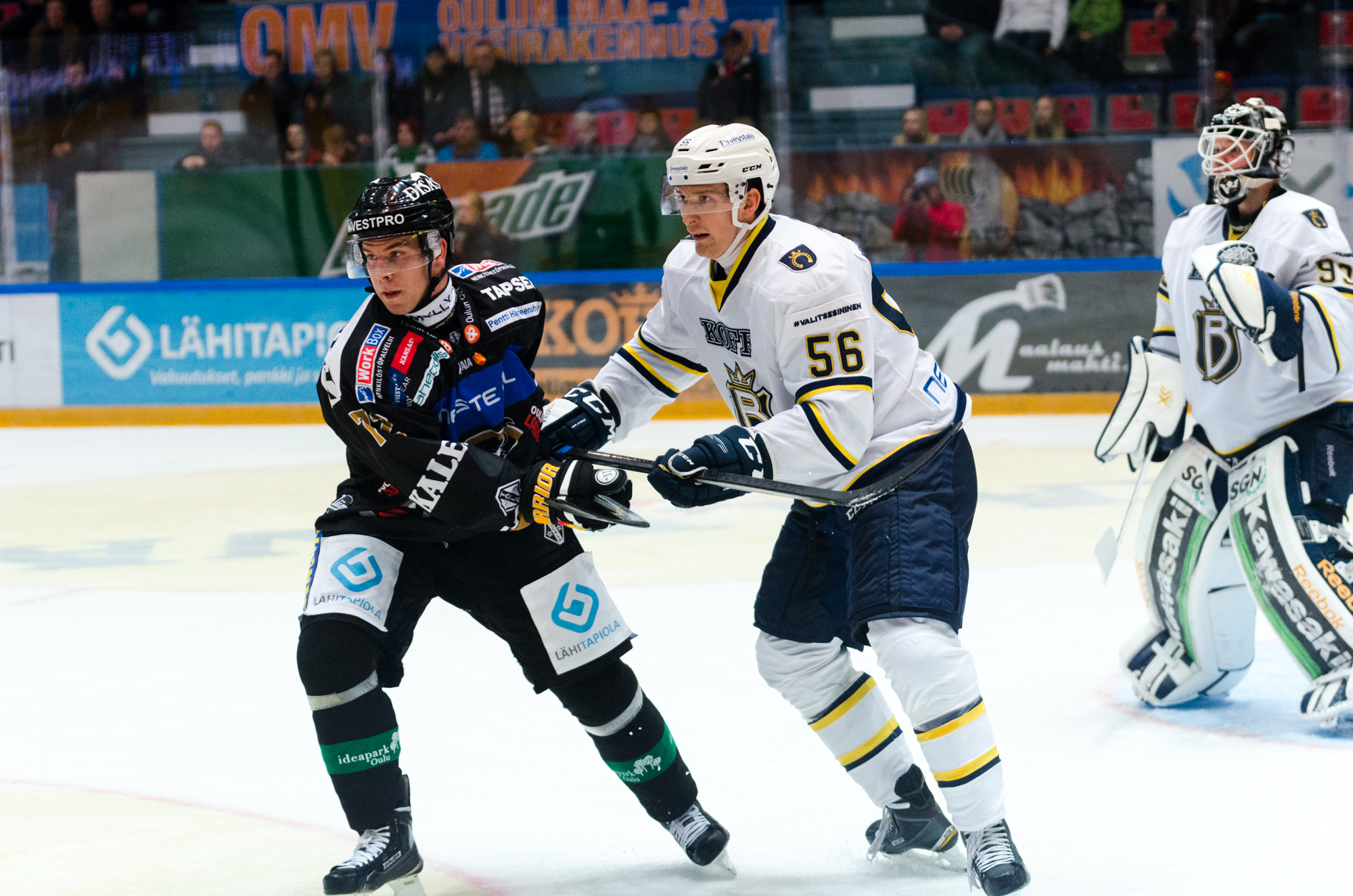
- Kalle Kaijomaa (white jersey) on 20 September 2014 in Kärpät - Blues match
- Born: June 1, 1984 (age 41) Joensuu, Finland
- Height: 6 ft 2 in (188 cm)
- Weight: 203 lb (92 kg; 14 st 7 lb)
- Position: Defence
- Shot: Left
- Played for: SaiPa; Mikkelin Jukurit; JYP Jyväskylä; Tappara; Växjö Lakers; Espoo Blues; HC TPS; Schwenninger Wild Wings; TUTO Hockey; Fehérvár AV19
- Playing career: 2005–2020

Kalle Kaijomaa (born June 1, 1984) is a Finnish former professional ice hockey defenceman.

== Playing career ==
Undrafted, Kaijomaa has previously played in his native Finnish Liiga, with SaiPa, JYP Jyväskylä, Tappara, Espoo Blues and HC TPS. At the conclusion of his loan with TPS from the Blues, Kaijomaa left Finland as a free agent for the second time in his career, signing a one-year deal with German-based club, Schwenninger Wild Wings of the top flight DEL on May 6, 2016.

Following an injury plagued 2018–19 season, his third with the Wild Wings, Kaijomaa left Schwenninger at the conclusion of his contract.

In November 2020, Kaijomaa announced his retirement from playing.
