= Ville Vainikainen =

Finnish ice hockey player

- Born: January 26, 1994 (age 31); Kuopio, Finland
- Height: 5 ft 11 in (180 cm)
- Weight: 205 lb (93 kg; 14 st 9 lb)
- Position: Forward
- Shoots: Left
- Liiga team Former teams: SaiPa; KooKoo
- Playing career: 2014–present

Ville Vainikainen (born January 26, 1994) is a Finnish professional ice hockey player. He is currently playing for SaiPa of the Finnish Liiga.

Vainikainen made his Liiga debut playing with SaiPa during the 2014-15 Liiga season.
