= Lauri Taipalus =

Finnish ice hockey player

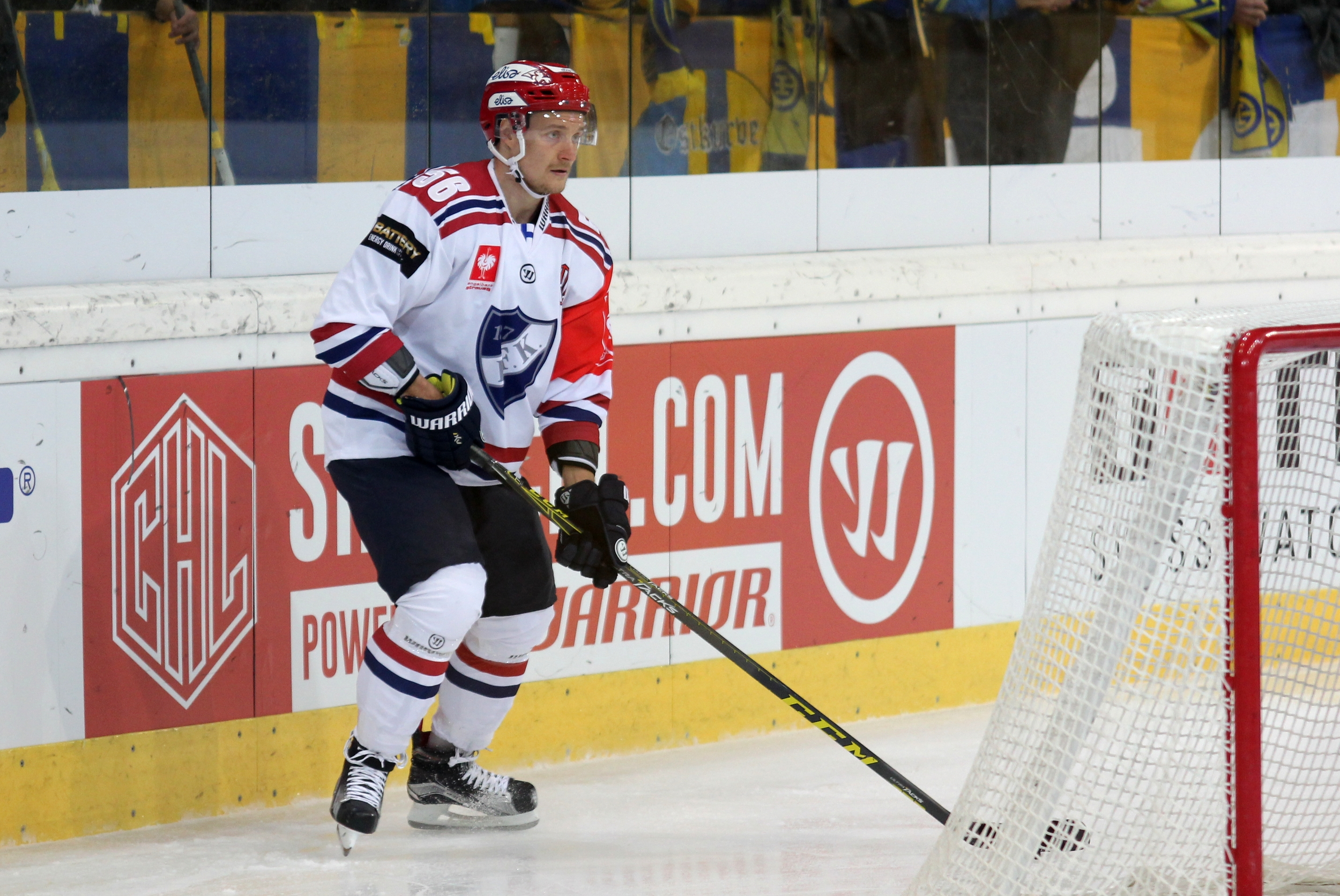
- Born: 14 January 1988 (age 38) Alavus, Finland
- Height: 5 ft 11 in (180 cm)
- Weight: 181 lb (82 kg; 12 st 13 lb)
- Position: Defence
- Shoots: Left
- SM-liiga team: JYP Jyväskylä
- Playing career: 2010–present

Lauri Taipalus (born 14 January 1988) is a Finnish professional ice hockey player who played with JYP Jyväskylä in the SM-liiga during the 2010–11 season. He played with SaiPa seasons 2012-14 and signed a contract with HIFK for the next season.
