= Markus Nenonen =

Finnish ice hockey player

- Nenonen in 2026
- Born: October 29, 1992 (age 33) Jämsänkoski, Finland
- Height: 6 ft 2 in (188 cm)
- Weight: 209 lb (95 kg; 14 st 13 lb)
- Position: Forward
- Shoots: Left
- Czech Extraliga team Former teams: HC Plzeň 1929; JYP Jyväskylä; Vaasan Sport; Tappara; HPK
- Playing career: 2011–present

Markus Nenonen (born October 29, 1992) is a Finnish professional ice hockey player. He is currently playing for HC Skoda Plzen of the Czech Extraliga.

Nenonen made his SM-liiga debut playing with JYP Jyväskylä during the 2012–13 SM-liiga season.
