= Sami Rajaniemi =

Finnish ice hockey player

- Born: August 20, 1992 (age 32); Oulainen, Finland
- Height: 6 ft 0 in (183 cm)
- Weight: 185 lb (84 kg; 13 st 3 lb)
- Position: Goaltender
- Catches: Left
- team Former teams: Free Agent; JYP Jyväskylä; Lahti Pelicans; Oulun Kärpät; Jukurit; Timrå IK
- NHL draft: Undrafted
- Playing career: 2011–present

Sami Rajaniemi (born August 20, 1992) is a Finnish ice hockey goaltender. He is currently an unrestricted free agent who most recently played with Timrå IK of the Swedish Hockey League (SHL).

Rajaniemi made his Liiga debut playing with JYP Jyväskylä during the 2013–14 Liiga season.
