= Mika Järvinen (ice hockey) =

Finnish ice hockey player

- Born: November 15, 1988 (age 36) Hämeenlinna, Finland
- Height: 5 ft 9 in (175 cm)
- Weight: 174 lb (79 kg; 12 st 6 lb)
- Position: Goaltender
- Catches: Left
- Liiga team: Vaasan Sport
- National team: Finland
- NHL draft: Undrafted
- Playing career: 2007–present

Mika Järvinen (born November 15, 1988) is a Finnish professional ice hockey goaltender. He currently plays for Vaasan Sport in Liiga.

He was the only goaltender who has scored a goal in the SM-liiga, done while playing for KalPa against Lukko on December 4, 2008.
