= Juuso Salmi =

Finnish ice hockey player

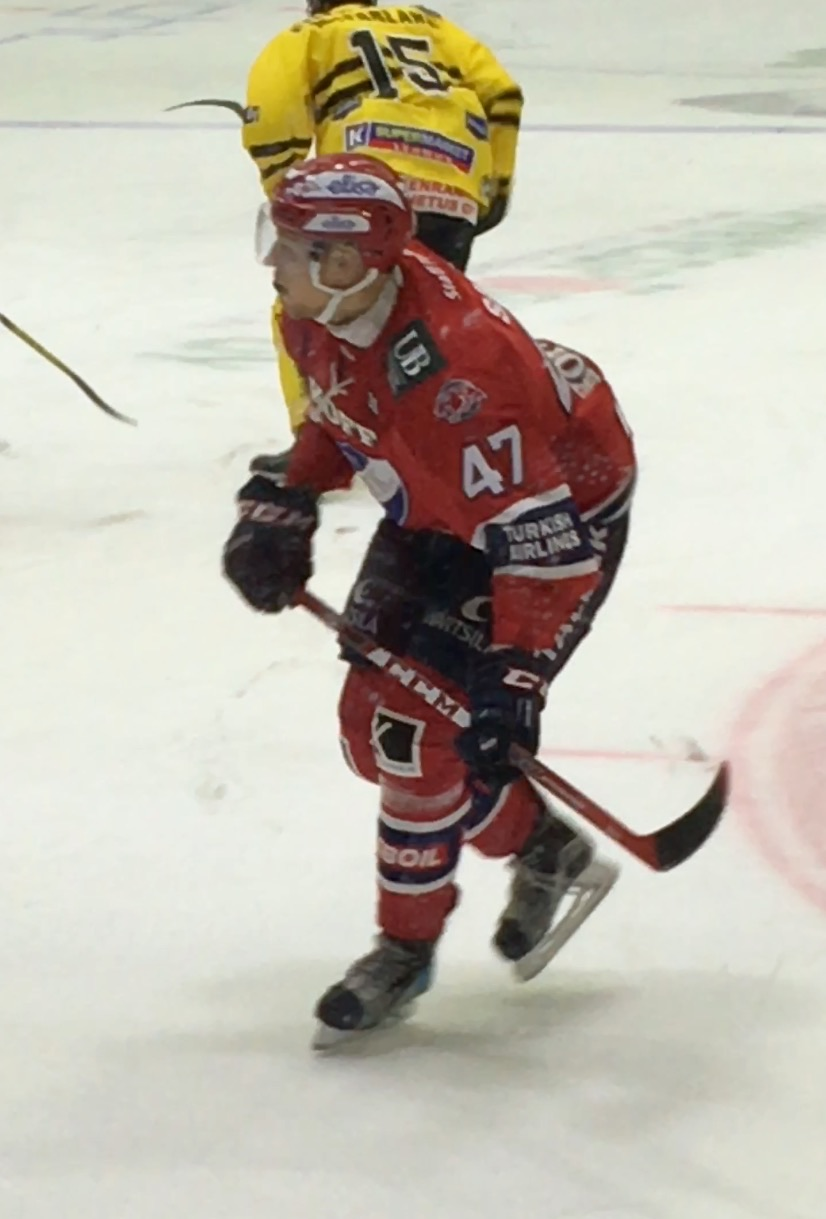
- Salmi playing for HIFK Helsinki in 2016.
- Born: July 15, 1991 (age 33); Helsinki, Finland
- Height: 6 ft 1 in (185 cm)
- Weight: 191 lb (87 kg; 13 st 9 lb)
- Position: Defence
- Shoots: Left
- Liiga team: HIFK
- Playing career: 2011–present

Juuso Salmi (born July 15, 1991) is a Finnish ice hockey defenceman who is currently playing for the HIFK Helsinki of the SM-liiga.

== Playing career ==
He played his first game for HIFK against Tappara.
