= Elias Karvonen =

Finnish ice hockey player

- Born: July 28, 1994 (age 32) Turku, Finland
- Height: 6 ft 0 in (183 cm)
- Weight: 194 lb (88 kg; 13 st 12 lb)
- Position: Forward
- Shoots: Left
- Liiga team: TPS
- Playing career: 2014–present

Elias Karvonen (born July 28, 1994) is a Finnish professional ice hockey forward currently playing for TPS in the Liiga.

Karvonen began playing for TPS through junior setup in 2010 and made his debut for the senior team during the 2014-15 Liiga season. He also had a brief loan spell with TUTO Hockey of Mestis during the 2016–17 season.
