= Elmeri Eronen =

Finnish ice hockey defenceman

- Born: 27 January 1995 (age 30); Turku, Finland
- Height: 5 ft 9 in (175 cm)
- Weight: 174 lb (79 kg; 12 st 6 lb)
- Position: Defence
- Shoots: Right
- Liiga team Former teams: HPK; HC TPS; Timrå IK
- Playing career: 2013–present

Elmeri Eronen (born 27 January 1995) is a Finnish professional ice hockey defenceman. He is currently playing with HPK in the Liiga.

Eronen made his Liiga debut playing with HC TPS during the 2013–14 Liiga season.
