= Henri Kanninen =

Finnish ice hockey player

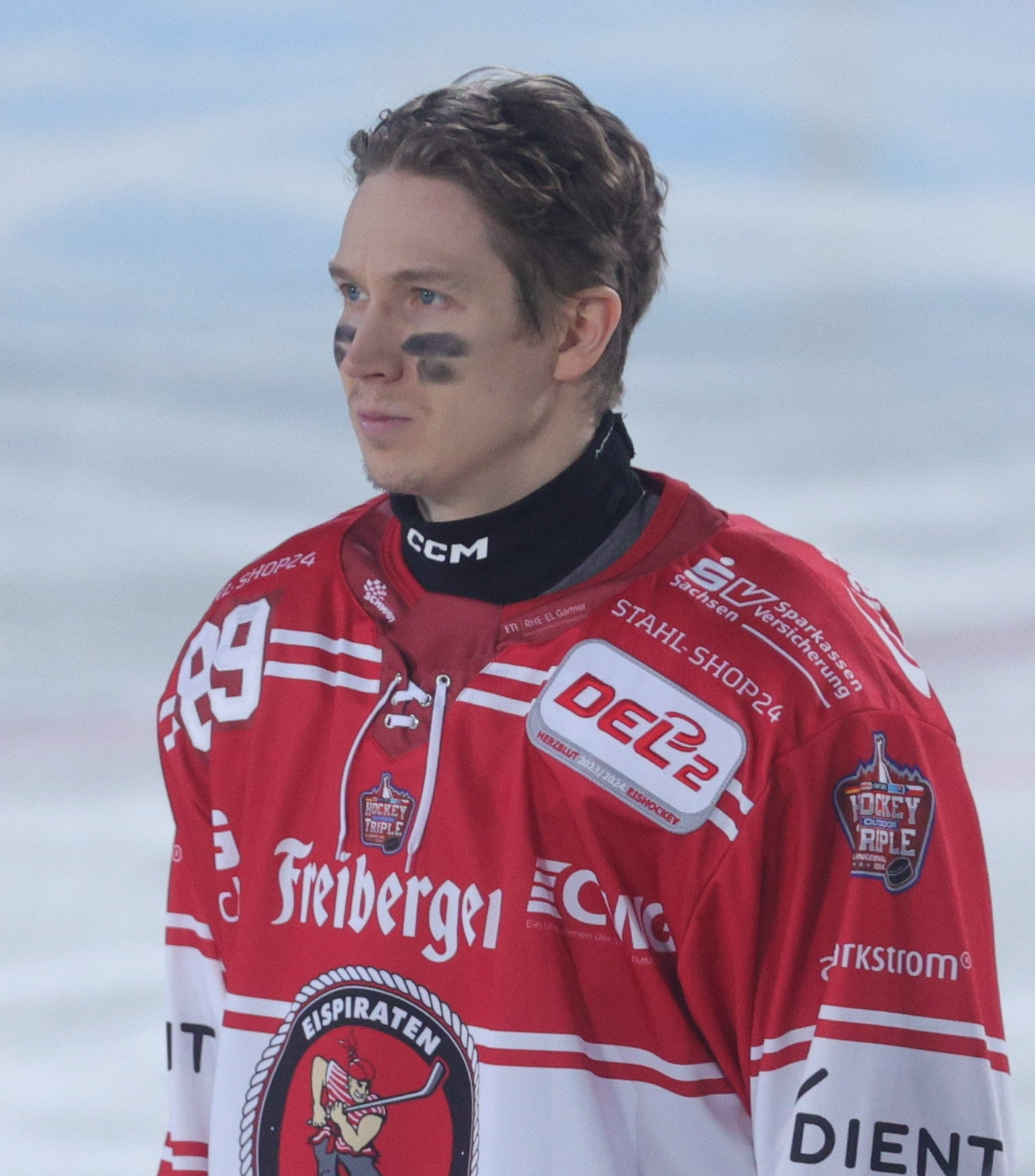
- Kanninen in 2024
- Born: October 17, 1994 (age 30); Jyväskylä, Finland
- Height: 6 ft 2 in (188 cm)
- Weight: 176 lb (80 kg; 12 st 8 lb)
- Position: Centre
- Shoots: Left
- Liiga team: JYP Jyväskylä
- Playing career: 2013–present

Henri Kanninen (born October 17, 1994) is a Finnish ice hockey player who plays as a centre for JYP Jyväskylä.
