= Reponen =

Reponen is a Finnish surname. Notable people with the surname include:

- Eemeli Reponen (born 1990), Finnish footballer and coach
- Milka Reponen (born 1991), Finnish orienteering competitor
