= Taneli Ronkainen =

Finnish ice hockey player

- Born: 28 March 1995 (age 30); Kuusamo, Finland
- Height: 182 cm (6 ft 0 in)
- Weight: 81 kg (179 lb; 12 st 11 lb)
- Position: Defenceman
- Shoots: Left
- PHL team Former teams: JKH GKS Jastrzębie; Oulun Kärpät; Lahti Pelicans; SaiPa; HC TPS
- Playing career: 2015–present

Taneli Ronkainen (born 28 March 1995) is a Finnish ice hockey defenceman currently playing for JKH GKS Jastrzębie of the Polska Hokej Liga.
