= Aleksi Rekonen =

Finnish ice hockey player

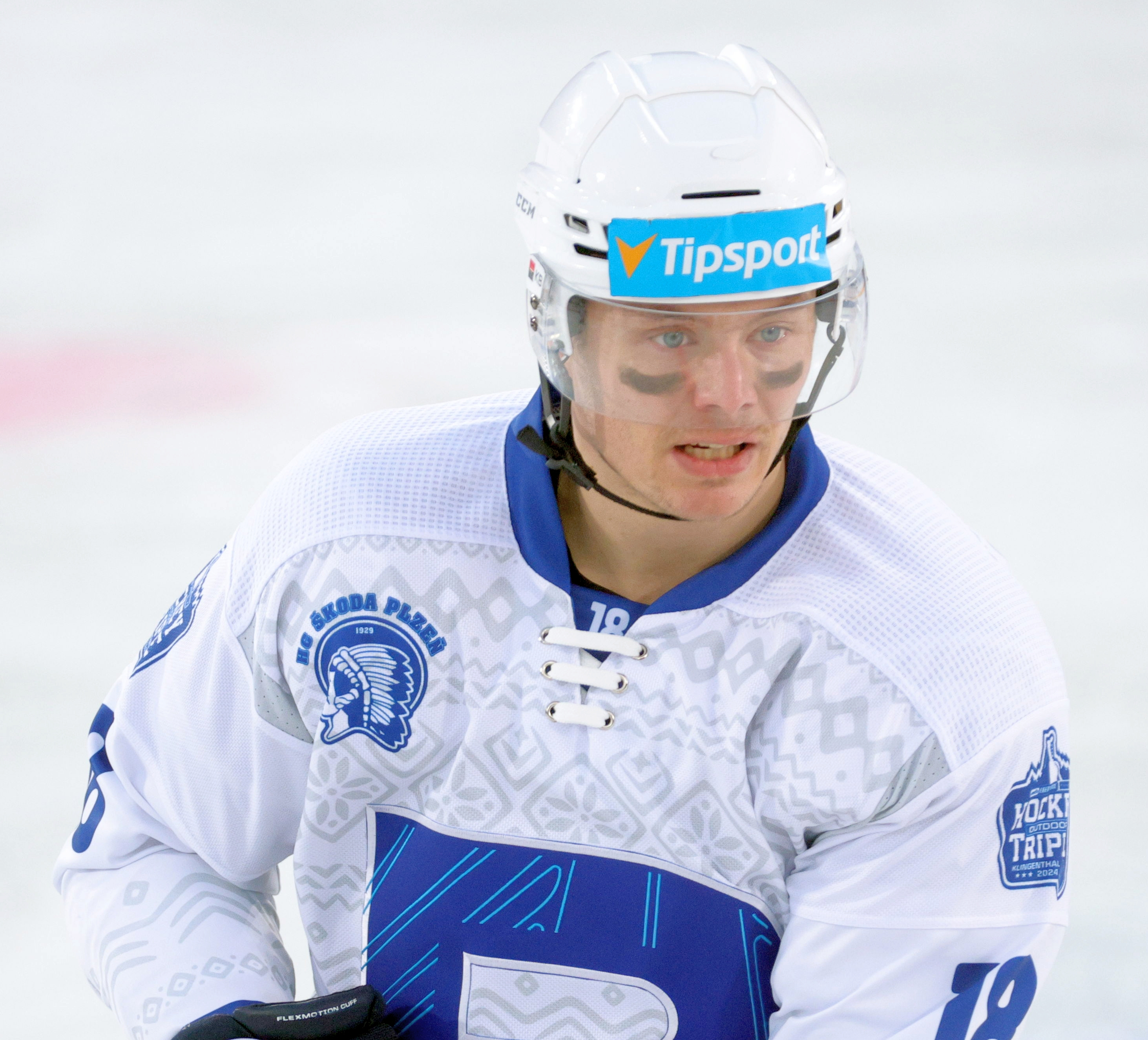
- Born: July 23, 1993 (age 31); Helsinki, Finland
- Height: 6 ft 0 in (183 cm)
- Weight: 185 lb (84 kg; 13 st 3 lb)
- Position: Centre
- Shoots: Left
- Allsv team Former teams: BIK Karlskoga; Kiekko-Vantaa; Jokerit; HPK; Vaasan Sport; Hermes; Oulun Kärpät; Lahti Pelicans
- NHL draft: Undrafted
- Playing career: 2011–present

Aleksi Rekonen (born July 23, 1993) is a Finnish professional ice hockey player. He is currently playing for Lahti Pelicans of the Finnish Liiga.

Rekonen made his Liiga debut playing with Jokerit during the 2013-14 Liiga season.
