= Marko Pöyhönen =

Finnish ice hockey player

- Born: September 10, 1987 (age 37); Hollola, Finland
- Height: 5 ft 10 in (178 cm)
- Weight: 194 lb (88 kg; 13 st 12 lb)
- Position: Right Wing
- Shoots: Left
- EBEL team Former teams: EC VSV; Lahti Pelicans; KHL Medveščak Zagreb; HKm Zvolen
- Playing career: 2006–present

Marko Pöyhönen (born September 10, 1987) is a Finnish professional ice hockey forward who currently plays for EC VSV in the Austrian Hockey League (EBEL).

He formerly played with the Lahti Pelicans of the SM-liiga.

On 2 July 2019, Pöyhönen returned to the EBEL, agreeing to a one-year contract with Austrian club, EC VSV.
