= 2017–18 Champions Hockey League =

European ice hockey tournament

Tournament details
- Dates: 24 August 2017 – 6 February 2018
- Teams: 32

Final positions
- Champions: (Finland) JYP (1st title)
- Runners-up: (Sweden) Växjö Lakers

Tournament statistics
- Games played: 125
- Goals scored: 735 (5.88 per game)
- Attendance: 421,134 (3,369 per game)
- Scoring leader: (Sweden) Fredrik Pettersson (16 points)

Awards
- MVP: (Czech Republic) Šimon Hrubec

The 2017–18 Champions Hockey League was the fourth season of the Champions Hockey League, a European ice hockey tournament. The tournament was reduced to 32 teams, and qualification was on sporting merits only. The six founding leagues are represented by between three and five teams (based on a three-year league ranking), while seven "challenge leagues" are represented by one team each. One place was reserved for the Continental Cup champion. Unlike in the three previous editions, founding teams did not automatically qualify. The season concluded with the final on 6 February 2018 at Vida Arena where JYP beat Växjö Lakers 2–0, becoming the first non-Swedish team to win the title.

== Team allocation ==
A total of 32 teams from different European first-tier leagues participate in the 2017–18 Champions Hockey League. Besides the Continental Cup champions, 24 teams from the six founding leagues, as well as the national champions from Slovakia, Norway, Denmark, France, Belarus, the United Kingdom and Poland qualified.

The qualification for these places was set out in the rules as follows:

1. National league champion (play-off winners)
2. Regular season winners
3. Regular season runner-up
4. Losing play-off finalist
5. Higher regular season ranked losing semi-finalist
6. Lower regular season ranked losing semi-finalist
7. Third placed team in regular season
8. Fourth placed team in regular season
9. Fifth placed team in regular season.

=== Teams ===
Team	City/Area	League	Qualification	Participation	Previous best
(Sweden) Frölunda HC	Gothenburg	Swedish Hockey League	2017 CHL winner	4th	champion
(Sweden) HV71	Jönköping	Swedish Hockey League	play-off champion	4th	round of 16
(Sweden) Växjö Lakers	Växjö	Swedish Hockey League	regular season winner	4th	semi-finals
(Sweden) Brynäs IF	Gävle	Swedish Hockey League	play-off finalist	1st	
(Sweden) Malmö Redhawks	Malmö	Swedish Hockey League	play-off semi-finalist	1st	
(Finland) Tappara	Tampere	Liiga	play-off champion	4th	round of 16
(Finland) TPS	Turku	Liiga	regular season runner-up	4th	quarter-finals
(Finland) KalPa	Kuopio	Liiga	play-off finalist	4th	round of 16
(Finland) JYP	Jyväskylä	Liiga	play-off semi-finalist	4th	round of 16
(Finland) HIFK	Helsinki	Liiga	play-off semi-finalist	4th	quarter-finals
(Switzerland) SC Bern	Bern	National League	play-off champion	4th	quarter-finals
(Switzerland) ZSC Lions	Zürich	National League	regular season runner-up	4th	quarter-finals
(Switzerland) EV Zug	Zug	National League	play-off finalist	4th	round of 32
(Switzerland) HC Davos	Davos	National League	play-off semi-finalist	3rd	semi-finals
(Czech Republic) Kometa Brno	Brno	Czech Extraliga	play-off champion	1st	
(Czech Republic) Bílí Tygři Liberec	Liberec	Czech Extraliga	regular season winner	4th	round of 16
(Czech Republic) Oceláři Třinec	Třinec	Czech Extraliga	regular season runner-up	3rd	round of 32
(Czech Republic) Mountfield HK	Hradec Králové	Czech Extraliga	play-off semi-finalist	1st	
(Germany) Red Bull München	Munich	Deutsche Eishockey Liga	play-off champion	3rd	round of 32
(Germany) Adler Mannheim	Mannheim	Deutsche Eishockey Liga	regular season runner-up	4th	round of 32
(Germany) Grizzlys Wolfsburg	Wolfsburg	Deutsche Eishockey Liga	play-off finalist	2nd	round of 32
(Austria) Vienna Capitals	Vienna	Austrian Hockey League	play-off champion	4th	round of 16
(Austria) Red Bull Salzburg	Salzburg	Austrian Hockey League	regular season runner-up	4th	round of 16
(Austria) EC KAC	Klagenfurt	Austrian Hockey League	play-off finalist	2nd	group stage
(United Kingdom) Nottingham Panthers	Nottingham	Elite Ice Hockey League	Continental Cup winner	2nd	group stage
(United Kingdom) Cardiff Devils	Cardiff	Elite Ice Hockey League	regular season champion	1st	
(Slovakia) HC '05 Banská Bystrica	Banská Bystrica	Tipsport Liga	play-off champion	1st	
(Norway) Stavanger Oilers	Stavanger	GET-ligaen	play-off champion	4th	round of 32
(Belarus) Neman Grodno	Grodno	Belarusian Extraleague	play-off champion	2nd	group stage
(Denmark) Esbjerg Energy	Esbjerg	Metal Ligaen	play-off champion	2nd	group stage
(France) Rapaces de Gap	Gap	Ligue Magnus	play-off champion	3rd	group stage
(Poland) ComArch Cracovia	Kraków	Polska Hokej Liga	play-off champion	2nd	group stage

== Group stage ==
Teams in the 2017–18 Champions Hockey League
Black: Group A; Purple: Group B; Blue: Group C; Red: Group D; Orange: Group E; Green: Group F; White: Group G; Yellow: Group H.

For the group stage, the teams were drawn into 8 groups of 4 teams. Each team plays home and away against every other team for a total of 6 games. The best 2 teams qualify to the round of 16.

As the reigning CHL champions, Frölunda HC was the top seeded team. In the top pot were also the reigning champions of the six founding leagues and the regular season winner of SHL, Växjö Lakers. The 16 remaining teams from founding leagues were placed to pots 2 and 3. The fourth pot included playoff champions of seven challenge leagues and Nottingham Panthers, the champion of 2016–17 IIHF Continental Cup.

=== Group stage tie-breaking criteria ===
If two teams are tied in points after the group stage is finished, the teams precedence is decided by head-to-head games. If teams are tied after that, then the team which was ranked higher prior to the tournament took precedence. When comparing head-to-head results, the following criteria were applied:

1. more points in games against the other tied team
2. better goal difference in games against the other tied team
3. more goals scored against the other tied team
4. more goals scored in a single game against the other tied team
  If the head-to-head games between teams ended as draws after regulation, this additional criterion was applied:
5. overtime wins against the other tied team
  If the head-to-head games between teams ended with game winning shots, this additional criterion was applied:
6. more goals scored in the two game winning shot competitions
  If teams are still tied, the higher position in the 2016–17 CHL club ranking was decided about precedence.

Pot 1	Pot 2	Pot 3	Pot 4
(Sweden) Frölunda HC (Sweden) HV71 (Finland) Tappara (Switzerland) SC Bern (Czech Republic) Kometa Brno (Germany) Red Bull München (Austria) Vienna Capitals (Sweden) Växjö Lakers	(Finland) TPS (Switzerland) ZSC Lions (Czech Republic) Bílí Tygři Liberec (Germany) Adler Mannheim (Austria) Red Bull Salzburg (Sweden) Brynäs IF (Finland) KalPa (Switzerland) EV Zug	(Czech Republic) Oceláři Třinec (Germany) Grizzlys Wolfsburg (Austria) EC KAC (Sweden) Malmö Redhawks (Finland) JYP (Switzerland) HC Davos (Czech Republic) Mountfield HK (Finland) HIFK	(Slovakia) HC '05 Banská Bystrica (Norway) Stavanger Oilers (Belarus) Neman Grodno (Denmark) Esbjerg Energy (United Kingdom) Cardiff Devils (France) Rapaces de Gap (Poland) ComArch Cracovia (United Kingdom) Nottingham Panthers

=== Group A ===
Pos	Team	Pld	W	OTW	OTL	L	GF	GA	GD	Pts	Qualification	TAP	RBS	WOB	BAB
1	(Finland) Tappara	6	5	0	0	1	26	11	+15	15	Advance to Playoffs	—	4–2	4–2	3–0
2	(Austria) Red Bull Salzburg	6	3	0	0	3	20	22	−2	9	Advance to Playoffs	1–6	—	4–3	5–0
3	(Germany) Grizzlys Wolfsburg	6	2	0	0	4	15	23	−8	6		1–7	4–5	—	4–3
4	(Slovakia) HC '05 Banská Bystrica	6	2	0	0	4	13	18	−5	6		5–2	5–3	0–1	—

Source: championshockeyleague.net

=== Group B ===
Pos	Team	Pld	W	OTW	OTL	L	GF	GA	GD	Pts	Qualification	MAL	KOM	KAL	OIL
1	(Sweden) Malmö Redhawks	6	4	0	1	1	23	17	+6	13	Advance to Playoffs	—	3–0	6–2	2–1
2	(Czech Republic) Kometa Brno	6	2	3	0	1	18	15	+3	12	Advance to Playoffs	5–4 (OT)	—	3–2 (OT)	4–3 (OT)
3	(Finland) KalPa	6	3	0	1	2	25	22	+3	10		6–4	2–4	—	7–1
4	(Norway) Stavanger Oilers	6	0	0	1	5	13	25	−12	1		3–4	1–2	4–6	—

Source: championshockeyleague.net

=== Group C ===
Pos	Team	Pld	W	OTW	OTL	L	GF	GA	GD	Pts	Qualification	EVZ	JYP	NEM	VIC
1	(Switzerland) EV Zug	6	3	1	0	2	20	16	+4	11	Advance to Playoffs	—	6–3	3–2 (SO)	3–1
2	(Finland) JYP	6	3	1	0	2	16	15	+1	11	Advance to Playoffs	3–2	—	3–2 (SO)	4–1
3	(Belarus) Neman Grodno	6	1	1	3	1	18	18	0	8		2–3	3–0	—	5–4 (OT)
4	(Austria) Vienna Capitals	6	1	1	1	3	17	22	−5	6		5–3	1–3	5–4 (SO)	—

Source: championshockeyleague.net

=== Group D ===
Pos	Team	Pld	W	OTW	OTL	L	GF	GA	GD	Pts	Qualification	MAN	TRI	HV71	ESB
1	(Germany) Adler Mannheim	6	5	0	0	1	26	12	+14	15	Advance to Playoffs	—	6–2	6–3	4–1
2	(Czech Republic) Oceláři Třinec	6	4	0	1	1	20	10	+10	13	Advance to Playoffs	3–0	—	3–0	9–1
3	(Sweden) HV71	6	2	1	0	3	16	16	0	8		1–4	2–1 (SO)	—	3–0
4	(Denmark) Esbjerg Energy	6	0	0	0	6	7	31	−24	0		2–6	1–2	2–7	—

Source: championshockeyleague.net

=== Group E ===
Pos	Team	Pld	W	OTW	OTL	L	GF	GA	GD	Pts	Qualification	VLH	LIB	HCD	CAR
1	(Sweden) Växjö Lakers	6	4	1	0	1	22	16	+6	14	Advance to Playoffs	—	6–3	5–3	3–2
2	(Czech Republic) Bílí Tygři Liberec	6	3	0	1	2	24	21	+3	10	Advance to Playoffs	3–4 (OT)	—	4–3	5–2
3	(Switzerland) HC Davos	6	2	0	1	3	22	19	+3	7		0–3	3–2	—	10–1
4	(United Kingdom) Cardiff Devils	6	1	1	0	4	17	29	−12	5		5–1	3–7	4–3 (OT)	—

Source: championshockeyleague.net

=== Group F ===
Pos	Team	Pld	W	OTW	OTL	L	GF	GA	GD	Pts	Qualification	NOT	SCB	TPS	MHK
1	(United Kingdom) Nottingham Panthers	6	3	1	0	2	18	17	+1	11	Advance to Playoffs	—	4–2	2–0	4–3 (OT)
2	(Switzerland) SC Bern	6	3	0	0	3	21	16	+5	9	Advance to Playoffs	5–2	—	4–0	5–2
3	(Finland) TPS	6	3	0	0	3	12	15	−3	9		5–2	3–1	—	3–1
4	(Czech Republic) Mountfield HK	6	2	0	1	3	18	21	−3	7		2–4	5–4	5–1	—

Source: championshockeyleague.net

=== Group G ===
Pos	Team	Pld	W	OTW	OTL	L	GF	GA	GD	Pts	Qualification	RBM	BIF	HIFK	CRA
1	(Germany) Red Bull München	6	5	0	0	1	21	11	+10	15	Advance to Playoffs	—	2–3	4–1	6–2
2	(Sweden) Brynäs IF	6	4	1	0	1	25	12	+13	14	Advance to Playoffs	2–3	—	4–3 (SO)	8–0
3	(Finland) HIFK	6	2	0	1	3	20	20	0	7		2–4	2–5	—	6–3
4	(Poland) ComArch Cracovia	6	0	0	0	6	8	31	−23	0		1–2	2–3	0–6	—

Source: championshockeyleague.net

=== Group H ===
Pos	Team	Pld	W	OTW	OTL	L	GF	GA	GD	Pts	Qualification	FHC	ZSC	KAC	GAP
1	(Sweden) Frölunda HC	6	5	1	0	0	21	10	+11	17	Advance to Playoffs	—	5–4 (OT)	2–1	5–1
2	(Switzerland) ZSC Lions	6	3	0	2	1	24	10	+14	11	Advance to Playoffs	1–2	—	3–0	4–0
3	(Austria) EC KAC	6	2	1	0	3	15	15	0	8		2–4	2–1 (OT)	—	4–2
4	(France) Rapaces de Gap	6	0	0	0	6	8	33	−25	0		1–3	1–11	3–6	—

Source: championshockeyleague.net

== Playoffs ==
=== Qualified teams ===
Group	Winners (seed)	Runners-up
A	(Finland) Tappara (2)	(Austria) Red Bull Salzburg
B	(Sweden) Malmö Redhawks (6)	(Czech Republic) Kometa Brno
C	(Switzerland) EV Zug (7)	(Finland) JYP
D	(Germany) Adler Mannheim (3)	(Czech Republic) Oceláři Třinec
E	(Sweden) Växjö Lakers (5)	(Czech Republic) Bílí Tygři Liberec
F	(United Kingdom) Nottingham Panthers (8)	(Switzerland) SC Bern
G	(Germany) Red Bull München (4)	(Sweden) Brynäs IF
H	(Sweden) Frölunda HC (1)	(Switzerland) ZSC Lions

=== Format ===
In each round except the final, the teams played two games and the aggregate score was decided the team which advances. As a rule, the first leg was hosted by the team who had inferior record in the tournament so far and the second leg was played on the home ice of the other team. If aggregate score is tied, a sudden death overtime followed. If the overtime is scoreless, the team who wins the game winning shot competition advances.

The final was played on the home ice of team who had better record in the tournament on February 6, 2018.

=== Bracket ===
The eight group winners and the eight second-placed teams advanced to the Round of 16. The teams were divided into two seeding groups and group winners were randomly drawn against runners-up. Teams who had faced each other in the group stage could not be drawn against each other in the round of 16. The draw took place in Helsinki, Finland on October 13, 2017.

Round of 16
1	(Finland) JYP	3	2	5
16	(Finland) Tappara	1	3	4
8	(Czech Republic) Kometa Brno	4	5	9
9	(Switzerland) EV Zug	3	2	5
5	(Sweden) Brynäs IF	3	2	5
12	(Germany) Adler Mannheim	2	1	3
4	(Czech Republic) Oceláři Třinec	2	2	4
13	(Sweden) Malmö Redhawks	1	1	2
6	(Austria) Red Bull Salzburg	2	3	5
11	(Sweden) Växjö Lakers	1	5	6
3	(Switzerland) SC Bern	2	5	7
14	(Germany) Red Bull München	3	2	5
7	(Switzerland) ZSC Lions	3	3	6
10	(United Kingdom) Nottingham Panthers	1	0	1
2	(Czech Republic) Bílí Tygři Liberec (OT)	2	6	8
15	(Sweden) Frölunda HC	3	4	7

Quarter-finals
(Finland) JYP	3	5	8
(Czech Republic) Kometa Brno	3	3	6
(Sweden) Brynäs IF	1	3	4
(Czech Republic) Oceláři Třinec	3	5	8
(Sweden) Växjö Lakers	2	4	6
(Switzerland) SC Bern	3	2	5
(Switzerland) ZSC Lions	1	0	1
(Czech Republic) Bílí Tygři Liberec (SO)	0	2	2

Semi-finals
(Finland) JYP (SO)	4	3	7
(Czech Republic) Oceláři Třinec	2	4	6
(Sweden) Växjö Lakers	1	6	7
(Czech Republic) Bílí Tygři Liberec	1	1	2

Final
(Finland) JYP	2
(Sweden) Växjö Lakers	0

Note:

1. The teams listed on top of each tie were runners up in the group stage and play the first leg at home. The bottom team were group winners and play the second leg at home. Due to conflicting schedules however, both Malmö Redhawks and Adler Mannheim ended up playing their first legs at home.
2. The order of the legs (what team starts at home) in the future rounds may be changed as the team with best record should have second match at home.

=== Round of 16 ===
The draw for the entire playoff was held on 13 October 2017 in Helsinki. The first legs were played on 31 October with return legs played the following week.

Team 1	Agg.	Team 2	1st leg	2nd leg
JYP (Finland)	5–4	(Finland) Tappara	3–1	2–3
Kometa Brno (Czech Republic)	9–5	(Switzerland) EV Zug	4–3	5–2
Brynäs IF (Sweden)	5–3	(Germany) Adler Mannheim	3–2	2–1
Oceláři Třinec (Czech Republic)	4–2	(Sweden) Malmö Redhawks	2–1	2–1
Red Bull Salzburg (Austria)	5–6	(Sweden) Växjö Lakers	2–1	3–5
SC Bern (Switzerland)	7–5	(Germany) Red Bull München	2–3	5–2
ZSC Lions (Switzerland)	6–1	(United Kingdom) Nottingham Panthers	3–1	3–0
Bílí Tygři Liberec (Czech Republic)	8–7	(Sweden) Frölunda HC	2–3	6–4 OT

==== First Leg ====
31 October 2017; 17:00 CET	Bílí Tygři Liberec (Czech Republic)	2–3 (1–0, 0–2, 1–1)	(Sweden) Frölunda HC	Home Credit Arena, Liberec; Attendance: 3,712

Game reference

Roman Will
Goalies
Johan Mattsson
Referees:
Peter Stano
Jozef Kubuš
Linesmen:
Miroslav Lhotský
Jiří Ondráček

Bakoš – 9:53	1–0
	1–1	24:15 – Stålberg
	1–2	28:28 – (PP) Lundqvist (Olofsson, Almquist)
Krenželok (Jelínek, Bakoš) (PP) – 43:14	2–2
	2–3	53:11 – (PP) Dahlin (Donovan)

8 min
Penalties
10 min
27
Shots
23

31 October 2017; 18:00 CET	JYP (Finland)	3–1 (1–0, 0–0, 2–1)	(Finland) Tappara	LähiTapiola Areena, Jyväskylä; Attendance: 3,279

Game reference

Eetu Laurikainen
Goalies
Dominik Hrachovina
Referees:
Andris Ansons
Mikael Sjöqvist
Linesmen:
Pasi Nieminen
Hannu Sormunen

Miklík (Hytönen) – 10:41	1–0
Suomela – 41:40	2–0
	2–1	47:38 – Jasu (Záborský, Kuusela)
Tuppurainen (Nattinen) – 56:17	3–1

2 min
Penalties
2 min
28
Shots
23

31 October 2017; 18:30 CET	Malmö Redhawks (Sweden)	1–2 (0–0, 1–0, 0–2)	(Czech Republic) Oceláři Třinec	Malmö Arena, Malmö; Attendance: 1,662

Game reference

Oscar Alsenfelt
Goalies
Šimon Hrubec
Referees:
Marc Wiegand
Daniel Stricker
Linesmen:
Ludvig Lundgren
Anders Nyqvist

Hardt (Storm) – 21:10	1–0
	1–1	40:53 – Svačina (Adamský, Polanský)
	1–2	57:10 – Chmielewski (Musil, Dravecký)

6 min
Penalties
10 min
29
Shots
26

31 October 2017; 19:00 CET	Kometa Brno (Czech Republic)	4–3 (1–0, 1–2, 2–1)	(Switzerland) EV Zug	DRFG Arena, Brno; Attendance: 3,345

Game reference

Lukáš Dostál
Goalies
Tobias Stephan
Referees:
Kristian Vikman
Anssi Salonen
Linesmen:
Tomáš Brejcha
Jiří Frodl

Süss (Horký) – 2:36	1–0
	1–1	28:25 – Stalberg
Mallet (Plášek, Zohorna) (SHG) – 36:15	2–1
	2–2	38:08 – (SHG) Suri (Stalberg, Helbling)
Haščák (Němec) (PP, 5 ON 3) – 48:36	3–2
Haščák (Němec) (PP) – 56:48	4–2
	4–3	59:20 – (PP) McIntyre (Roe, Martschini)

8 min
Penalties
16 min
43
Shots
24

31 October 2017; 19:30 CET	Adler Mannheim (Germany)	2–3 (0–1, 1–2, 1–0)	(Sweden) Brynäs IF	SAP Arena, Mannheim; Attendance: 4,176

Game reference

Dennis Endras
Goalies
Linus Fernström
Referees:
Daniel Pražák
Vladimír Pešina
Linesmen:
Robert Schelewski
Tobias Schwenk

	0–1	14:46 – Paille (Ikonen, Bertilsson)
	0–2	29:14 – Hirsch (Alcén, Carlsson)
Plachta (Adam) – 34:00	1–2
	1–3	35:29 – Jensen (Ikonen, Paille)
Plachta (Raedeke, Desjardins) – 57:38	2–3

6 min
Penalties
10 min
39
Shots
27

31 October 2017; 19:30 CET	Red Bull Salzburg (Austria)	2–1 (2–0, 0–1, 0–0)	(Sweden) Växjö Lakers	Eisarena Salzburg, Salzburg; Attendance: 2,561

Game reference

Luka Gracnar
Goalies
Viktor Andrén
Referees:
Ivan Fateev
Marian Rohatsch
Linesmen:
Elias Seewald
David Nothegger

Schiechl (Hochkofler, Cijan) – 2:04	1–0
Pallestrang (Cijan) – 6:52	2–0
	2–1	36:49 – Fröberg (Welch, Brodecki)

6 min
Penalties
2 min
19
Shots
43

31 October 2017; 19:45 CET	SC Bern (Switzerland)	2–3 (1–0, 1–2, 0–1)	(Germany) Red Bull München	PostFinance Arena, Bern; Attendance: 13,763

Game reference

Leonardo Genoni
Goalies
Danny aus den Birken
Referees:
Mikael Holm
Linus Öhlund
Linesmen:
Cedric Borga
Balazs Kovacs

Ebbett (Arcobello, Noreau) (PP) – 13:41	1–0
	1–1	21:16 – Aucoin (Pinizzotto)
	1–2	23:57 – Eder
Krueger (Randegger, Pyörälä) – 26:28	2–2
	2–3	58:21 – Kastner (Mauer)

2 min
Penalties
8 min
51
Shots
35

31 October 2017; 19:45 CET	ZSC Lions (Switzerland)	3–1 (1–0, 0–0, 2–1)	(United Kingdom) Nottingham Panthers	Hallenstadion, Zürich; Attendance: 3,024

Game reference

Lukas Flueler
Goalies
Michael Garnett
Referees:
André Schrader
Aleksi Rantala
Linesmen:
Nicolas Fluri
Simon Wust

Guerra (Korpikoski) – 8:56	1–0
	1–1	40:52 – Perlini (Mosey, Shalla)
Wick – 45:51	2–1
Pettersson (Suter, Nilsson) – 55:40	3–1

8 min
Penalties
4 min
34
Shots
19

==== Second Leg ====
7 November 2017; 18:00 CET	Oceláři Třinec (Czech Republic)	2–1 (1–0, 0–0, 1–1)	(Sweden) Malmö Redhawks	Werk Arena, Třinec; Attendance: 4,782

Game reference

Šimon Hrubec
Goalies
Oscar Alsenfelt
Referees:
Marc Iwert
Daniel Piechaczek
Linesmen:
Josef Špůr
Daniel Hynek

Marcinko (Linhart, Irgl) – 6:22	1–0
	1–1	56:09 – (SHG) Bryggman (Händemark, Olsson)
Cienciala (Kovařčík) (ENG) – 59:42	2–1

10 min
Penalties
10 min
29
Shots
21

HC Oceláři Třinec won 4–2 on Aggregate.

7 November 2017; 18:00 CET	Tappara (Finland)	3–2 (1–0, 0–2, 2–0)	(Finland) JYP	Tampere Ice Stadium, Tampere; Attendance: 4,221

Game reference

Dominik Hrachovina
Goalies
Eetu Laurikainen
Referees:
Maxim Sidorenko
Sören Persson
Linesmen:
Markus Hagerström
Sakari Suominen

Kuusela (Záborský, Mikkola) – 3:12	1–0
	1–1	22:17 – Suomela (Tuppurainen, Kalteva)
	1–2	35:00 – Kalteva (Nattinen, Turkulainen)
Järvinen (Peltola, Lehtonen) (PP) – 49:28	2–2
Peltola (Rantakari, Kuusela) (PP) – 54:14	3–2

2 min
Penalties
12 min
24
Shots
32

JYP won 5–4 on Aggregate.

7 November 2017; 18:30 CET	Brynäs IF (Sweden)	2–1 (0–1, 0–0, 2–0)	(Germany) Adler Mannheim	Gavlerinken Arena, Gävle; Attendance: 4,252

Game reference

Linus Fernström
Goalies
Dennis Endras
Referees:
Lasse Heikkinen
Anssi Salonen
Linesmen:
Daniel Persson
Jimmy Dahmén

	0–1	1:39 – Setoguchi (Larkin)
Blomqvist (Clark) (PP, 5 ON 3) – 57:20	1–1
Ölund (Ikonen, Kilström) (PP, ENG) – 59:08	2–1

10 min
Penalties
108 min
32
Shots
11

Brynäs IF won 5–3 on Aggregate.

7 November 2017; 19:00 CET	Frölunda HC (Sweden)	4–6 (OT) (1–1, 1–0, 2–4) (OT 0–1)	(Czech Republic) Bílí Tygři Liberec	Frölundaborg, Gothenburg; Attendance: 1,570

Game reference

Johan Mattsson
Goalies
Jaroslav Janus
Referees:
Manuel Nikolić
Marcus Vinnerborg
Linesmen:
Henrik Pihlblad
Alexander Waldejer

Widerström (Hjalmarsson, Stålberg) – 6:02	1–0
	1–1	18:47 – (PP) Ševc (Bakoš, Krenželok)
Olofsson (Lasch, Almquist) (PP) – 31:58	2–1
	2–2	43:47 – Šmíd (Krenželok, Jašek)
	2–3	48:19 – Plutnar (Ordoš)
Grundström (Lundqvist, Lasch) (PP) – 50:37	3–3
	3–4	50:56 – Vantuch (Ševc, Havlín)
Lasch (Lundqvist, Grundström) – 54:41	4–4
	4–5	59:10 – Bakoš (Ševc, Jelínek)
	4–6	61:01 – (PP) Bulíř (Bakoš, Ševc)

8 min
Penalties
12 min
44
Shots
22

Bílí Tygři Liberec won 8–7 on Aggregate in Overtime.

7 November 2017; 19:00 CET	Växjö Lakers (Sweden)	5–3 (1–2, 2–0, 2–1)	(Austria) Red Bull Salzburg	Vida Arena, Växjö; Attendance: 1,354

Game reference

Viktor Fasth
Goalies
Bernhard Starkbaum
Referees:
Adam Kika
Jan Hribik
Linesmen:
Ludvig Lundgren
Anders Nyqvist

Calof (Persson) – 8:08	1–0
	1–1	11:04 – (PP) Harris (Schremp, Mueller)
	1–2	14:46 – Raffl (Rauchenwald, Hughes)
Bokk (Persson, Rosén) (PP) – 26:16	2–2
Røndbjerg (Bohm, Josefsson) – 31:18	3–2
Josefsson (Røndbjerg, Persson) – 48:09	4–2
	4–3	51:25 – (PP) Schremp (Mueller, Starkbaum)
Pettersson (Rosén, Bokk) – 56:29	5–3

10 min
Penalties
6 min
34
Shots
23

Växjö Lakers won 6–5 on Aggregate.

7 November 2017; 19:30 CET	Red Bull München (Germany)	2–5 (1–1, 1–1, 0–3)	(Switzerland) SC Bern	Olympia Eishalle, Munich; Attendance: 2,690

Game reference

David Leggio
Goalies
Leonardo Genoni
Referees:
Milan Novák
Stefan Fonselius
Linesmen:
Lukas Kohlmüller
Andreas Hofer

Macek (Pinizzotto, Abeltshauser) – 9:09	1–0
	1–1	9:47 – Scherwey
Joslin (Kastner, Button) – 21:34	2–1
	2–2	26:47 – (PP) Moser (Ebbett, Noreau)
	2–3	45:27 – Hischier (Randegger, Arcobello)
	2–4	49:48 – Bodenmann (Ebbett, Raymond)
	2–5	56:42 – Ebbett

8 min
Penalties
8 min
39
Shots
39

SC Bern won 7–5 on Aggregate.

7 November 2017; 19:45 CET	EV Zug (Switzerland)	2–5 (1–1, 0–2, 1–2)	(Czech Republic) Kometa Brno	Bossard Arena, Zug; Attendance: 3,846

Game reference

Tobias Stephan
Goalies
Karel Vejmelka
Referees:
Benjamin Hoppe
Marc Lemelin
Linesmen:
Roman Kaderli
Balazs Kovacs

	0–1	13:54 – Nahodil (Dočekal)
Diaz (Stalberg, Martschini) (PP) – 19:17	1–1
	1–2	28:30 – Mlynář (Gajarský)
	1–3	32:14 – (PP) Mallet
	1–4	40:51 – (PP) Bartejs (Hruška)
	1–5	41:28 – Nahodil
Martschini (Stalberg) – 45:22	2–5

22 min
Penalties
8 min
36
Shots
30

HC Kometa Brno won 9–5 on Aggregate.

7 November 2017; 20:00 CET	Nottingham Panthers (United Kingdom)	0–3 (0–0, 0–1, 0–2)	(Switzerland) ZSC Lions	Motorpoint Arena, Nottingham; Attendance: 6,598

Game reference

Michael Garnett
Goalies
Lukas Flueler
Referees:
Mikael Andersson
Mikael Nord
Linesmen:
Andrew Dalton
James Kavanagh

0–1	26:24 – Pettersson (Nilsson, Flueler)
0–2	49:10 – Wick (Kenins)
0–3	54:20 – (PP, 5 ON 3) Pettersson (Nilsson)

37 min
Penalties
6 min
25
Shots
30

ZSC Lions won 6–1 on Aggregate.

=== Quarter-finals ===
First legs were played on 5 December, return legs were played on 12 December.

Team 1	Agg.	Team 2	1st leg	2nd leg
JYP (Finland)	8–6	(Czech Republic) Kometa Brno	3–3	5–3
Brynäs IF (Sweden)	4–8	(Czech Republic) Oceláři Třinec	1–3	3–5
Växjö Lakers (Sweden)	6–5	(Switzerland) SC Bern	2–4	3–2
ZSC Lions (Switzerland)	1–2	(Czech Republic) Bílí Tygři Liberec	1–0	0–2 SO

==== First Leg ====
5 December 2017; 17:00 CET	Oceláři Třinec (Czech Republic)	3–1 (0–0, 0–1, 3–0)	(Sweden) Brynäs IF	Werk Arena, Třinec; Attendance: 4,081

Game reference

Šimon Hrubec
Goalies
Linus Fernström
Referees:
Manuel Nikolić
Marc Lemelin
Linesmen:
Jiří Gebauer
Jiří Ondráček

	0–1	34:48 – Miller (Clark, Kilström)
Rákos (Marcinko, Mikulík) (PP) – 40:25	1–1
Adamský (Polanský, Irgl) – 43:45	2–1
Chmielewski (Kovařčík, Kovařčík) – 52:21	3–1

36
Shots
30

5 December 2017; 18:00 CET	JYP (Finland)	3–3 (1–2, 1–1, 1–0)	(Czech Republic) Kometa Brno	LähiTapiola Areena, Jyväskylä; Attendance: 2,317

Game reference

Jussi Olkinuora
Goalies
Pavel Jekel
Referees:
Alessandro DiPietro
Daniel Stricker
Linesmen:
Pasi Nieminen
Tommi Niittylä

	0–1	6:00 – Süss (Mallet, Bartejs)
	0–2	7:50 – Süss (Vincour, Gulaši)
Suomela (Turkulainen, Miklík) (PP) – 15:45	1–2
Puustinen (Immonen) (PP) – 29:44	2–2
	2–3	36:14 – Süss (Vincour, Vágner)
Mäenpää (Turkulainen, Miklík) – 56:43	3–3

33 min
Penalties
18 min
40
Shots
19

5 December 2017; 19:15 CET	Bílí Tygři Liberec (Czech Republic)	0–1 (0–0, 0–0, 0–1)	(Switzerland) ZSC Lions	Home Credit Arena, Liberec; Attendance: 3,842

Game reference
Jaroslav Janus	Goalies	Niklas Schlegel	Referees: Milan Novák; Jozef Kubuš; Linesmen: Jakub Frodl; Miroslav Lhotský
0–1 / 44:12 – Pestoni (Pettersson, Baltisberger)			Referees: Milan Novák; Jozef Kubuš; Linesmen: Jakub Frodl; Miroslav Lhotský
0 min	Penalties	8 min	Referees: Milan Novák; Jozef Kubuš; Linesmen: Jakub Frodl; Miroslav Lhotský
24	Shots	17	Referees: Milan Novák; Jozef Kubuš; Linesmen: Jakub Frodl; Miroslav Lhotský

5 December 2017; 20:00 CET	SC Bern (Switzerland)	3–2 (1–0, 1–0, 1–2)	(Sweden) Växjö Lakers	PostFinance Arena, Bern; Attendance: 13,629

Game reference

Leonardo Genoni
Goalies
Viktor Fasth
Referees:
Kristian Vikman
Anssi Salonen
Linesmen:
David Obwegeser
Balazs Kovacs

Haas (Blum (PP) – 2:01	1–0
Bodenmann (Raymond, Haas) (PP) – 27:26	2–0
	2–1	43:22 – Fröberg
	2–2	46:01 – Rosén (Kiiskinen, Calof)
Untersander (Arcobello, Rüfenacht) – 55:35	3–2

8 min
Penalties
37 min
29
Shots
34

==== Second Leg ====
12 December 2017; 17:30 CET	Kometa Brno (Czech Republic)	3–5 (0–3, 1–0, 2–2)	(Finland) JYP	DRFG Arena, Brno; Attendance: 4,116

Game reference

Marek Čiliak
Goalies
Jussi Olkinuora
Referees:
Peter Stano
Daniel Piechaczek
Linesmen:
Josef Špůr
Daniel Hynek

	0–1	5:17 – Immonen (Tuppurainen, Nattinen)
	0–2	13:36 – Puustinen (Suomela, Turkulainen)
	0–3	14:57 – Kolehmainen
Horký (Zohorna) (PP) – 38:50	1–3
	1–4	47:10 – Nattinen (Immonen, Tuppurainen)
Nečas (Horký) – 50:00	2–4
Svoboda (Nečas, Krejčík) (PP) – 53:36	3–4
	3–5	59:43 – (ENG) Yonkman (Immonen)

4 min
Penalties
10 min
31
Shots
27

JYP won 8–6 on Aggregate.

12 December 2017; 18:30 CET	Växjö Lakers (Sweden)	4–2 (1–1, 1–0, 2–1)	(Switzerland) SC Bern	Vida Arena, Växjö; Attendance: 1,275

Game reference

Viktor Andrén
Goalies
Leonardo Genoni
Referees:
Lasse Heikkinen
Stefan Fonselius
Linesmen:
Ludvig Lundgren
Anders Nyqvist

Calof (Bohm, Persson) – 2:09	1–0
	1–1	8:06 – (PP) Arcobello (Scherwey, Andersson)
Reddox (Bohm, Fröberg) – 23:42	2–1
Pettersson (Reddox, Högberg) – 41:25	3–1
Rosén (Persson, Shinnimin) – 44:16	4–1
	4–2	53:52 – Arcobello (Scherwey, Untersander)

10 min
Penalties
4 min
26
Shots
29

Växjö Lakers won 6–5 on Aggregate.

12 December 2017; 18:30 CET	Brynäs IF (Sweden)	3–5 (0–1, 2–2, 1–2)	(Czech Republic) Oceláři Třinec	Gavlerinken Arena, Gävle; Attendance: 1,386

Game reference

David Rautio
Goalies
Šimon Hrubec
Referees:
Marc Wiegand
Tobias Wehrli
Linesmen:
Orjan Ahlen
Jimmy Dahmén

	0–1	12:19 – Marcinko (Krajíček, Rákos)
	0–2	25:00 – Petružálek (Polanský, Musil)
Bjurström (Ikonen, Bertilsson) – 29:20	1–2
	1–3	32:34 – Irgl (Rákos, Kovář)
Elias (Jensen, Gunderson) (PP) – 39:52	2–3
	2–4	40:25 – Musil (Linhart, Polanský)
Mannberg (Blomqvist, Boqvist) – 49:03	3–4
	3–5	59:40 – Mikulík (Dravecký)

6 min
Penalties
10 min
44
Shots
29

HC Oceláři Třinec won 8–4 on Aggregate.

12 December 2017; 20:00 CET	ZSC Lions (Switzerland)	0–2 (0–2 SO) (0–0, 0–0, 0–1) (0–2 SO)	(Czech Republic) Bílí Tygři Liberec	Hallenstadion, Zürich; Attendance: 3,412

Game reference
0–1 / 41:39 – Krenželok (Kolmann, Jelínek; 0–2 / 70:00 – (SO) Bakos
(miss); Geering (miss) (miss); Klein (miss)	Shootout	(miss); Bakos (miss); Kolmann

Bílí Tygři Liberec won 2–1 on aggregate after winning 2–0 in a shootout.

=== Semi-finals ===
First legs were played on 9 January, return legs were played on 16 January 2018.

Team 1	Agg.	Team 2	1st leg	2nd leg
JYP (Finland)	7–6	(Czech Republic) Oceláři Třinec	4–2	3–4 SO
Växjö Lakers (Sweden)	7–2	(Czech Republic) Bílí Tygři Liberec	1–1	6–1

==== First Leg ====
9 January 2018; 17:30 CET	Bílí Tygři Liberec (Czech Republic)	1–1 (0–0, 0–1, 1–0)	(Sweden) Växjö Lakers	Home Credit Arena, Liberec; Attendance: 5,718

Game reference
Jaroslav Janus	Goalies	Viktor Andrén	Referees: Kristian Vikman; Daniel Stricker; Linesmen: Miroslav Lhotský; Jiří Ondráček
Jašek (Lakatoš) – 46:17 / Goals / 20:33 – Reddox (Fröberg)			Referees: Kristian Vikman; Daniel Stricker; Linesmen: Miroslav Lhotský; Jiří Ondráček
10 min	Penalties	10 min	Referees: Kristian Vikman; Daniel Stricker; Linesmen: Miroslav Lhotský; Jiří Ondráček
21	Shots	39	Referees: Kristian Vikman; Daniel Stricker; Linesmen: Miroslav Lhotský; Jiří Ondráček

9 January 2018; 18:00 CET	JYP (Finland)	4–2 (0–1, 4–0, 0–1)	(Czech Republic) Oceláři Třinec	LähiTapiola Areena, Jyväskylä; Attendance: 2,646

Game reference

Jussi Olkinuora
Goalies
Peter Hamerlík
Referees:
Benjamin Hoppe
Mikael Nord
Linesmen:
Pasi Nieminen
Jani Pesonen

	0–1	11:47 – (PP) Adamský (Polanský, Krajíček)
Rooba (Jokinen, Turkulainen) – 26:25	1–1
Mäenpää (Puustinen, Tuppurainen) (PP, 5 ON 3) – 32:04	2–1
Mäenpää (Immonen) (PP) – 33:55	3–1
Kolehmainen (Vainio, Saari) – 34:19	4–1
	4–2	42:16 – Marcinko (Svačina, Růžička)

6 min
Penalties
10 min
29
Shots
38

==== Second Leg ====
16 January 2018; 17:00 CET	Oceláři Třinec (Czech Republic)	4–3 (SO 0–2) (1–2, 1–0, 2–0) (0–0) (SO 0–2)	(Finland) JYP	Werk Arena, Třinec; Attendance: 5,048

Game reference

Šimon Hrubec
Goalies
Jussi Olkinuora
Referees:
Mikael Andersson
Mark Lemelin
Linesmen:
Daniel Hynek
Josef Špůr

Růžička (Marcinko, Rákos) – 2:07	1–0
	1–1	10:49 – Vainio (Immonen)
	1–2	17:36 – (PP) Immonen (Hytönen)
Kovařčík ( Chmielewski, Dravecký) – 25:07	2–2
Musil (Kovařčík) – 47:50	3–2
Kovařčík (Cienciala) – 50:56	4–2
	4–3	70:00 – (SO) Immonen

Polanský (miss)
Vlach (miss)
Růžička (miss)
Chmielewski (miss)
Shootout
(miss) Nattinen
(miss) Puustinen
Immonen
Suomela
4 min
Penalties
8 min
43
Shots
34

JYP won 7–6 on Aggregate after winning 2–0 in a shootout.

16 January 2018; 18:30 CET	Växjö Lakers (Sweden)	6–1 (3–0, 1–1, 2–0)	(Czech Republic) Bílí Tygři Liberec	Vida Arena, Växjö; Attendance: 4,711

Game reference

Viktor Fasth
Goalies
Jaroslav Janus
Referees:
André Schrader
Daniel Piechaczek
Linesmen:
Ludvig Lundgren
Henrik Pihlblad

Pettersson (Martonsson, Pesonen) (PP) – 5:50	1–0
Lundberg (Shinnimin, Calof) – 6:26	2–0
Fröberg (Netterberg, Welch) – 15:35	3–0
Kiiskinen (Pesonen, Persson)	4–0
	4–1	39:10 – (PP) Jelínek (Krenželok, Ševc)
Netterberg – 52:12	5–1
Pettersson (Kiiskinen, Welch) – 58:15	6–1

4 min
Penalties
6 min
36
Shots
16

Växjö Lakers won 7–2 on Aggregate.

=== Final ===
The final was played on 6 February 2018.

6 February 2018; 18:45 CET	Växjö Lakers (Sweden)	0–2 (0–0, 0–1, 0–1)	(Finland) JYP	Vida Arena, Växjö; Attendance: 5,750

Game reference
Viktor Fasth	Goalies	Juho Olkinuora	Referees: (Austria) Mark Lemelin (Germany) Daniel Piechaczek; Linesmen: (Germany) Lukas Kohlmüller (Austria) Elias Seewald
0–1 / 34:32 – Nättinen (Kalteva) (PP); 0–2 / 59:40 – Kolehmainen (SH, ENG)			Referees: (Austria) Mark Lemelin (Germany) Daniel Piechaczek; Linesmen: (Germany) Lukas Kohlmüller (Austria) Elias Seewald
6 min	Penalties	8 min	Referees: (Austria) Mark Lemelin (Germany) Daniel Piechaczek; Linesmen: (Germany) Lukas Kohlmüller (Austria) Elias Seewald
31	Shots	18	Referees: (Austria) Mark Lemelin (Germany) Daniel Piechaczek; Linesmen: (Germany) Lukas Kohlmüller (Austria) Elias Seewald

== Statistics ==
=== Scoring leaders ===
Player	Team	GP	G	A	PTS	PIM	+/–	GWG	PPG	SHG	SOG	S%
(Sweden) Fredrik Pettersson	(Switzerland) ZSC Lions	9	9	7	16	4	+7	4	4	0	37	24.32%
(United States) Ryan Lasch	(Sweden) Frölunda HC	7	4	11	15	4	+5	2	1	0	21	19.05%
(Slovakia) Martin Bakoš	(Czech Republic) Bílí Tygři Liberec	10	10	4	14	4	+5	1	3	1	42	23.81%
(Canada) Andrew Ebbett	(Switzerland) SC Bern	10	4	7	11	2	–5	0	1	0	30	13.33%
(Czech Republic) Jiří Polanský	(Czech Republic) Oceláři Třinec	12	3	8	11	10	+5	0	1	0	18	16.67%
(Sweden) Joel Persson	(Sweden) Växjö Lakers	13	1	10	11	2	+4	0	1	0	32	3.13%
(Canada) Kevin Clark	(Sweden) Brynäs IF	8	4	6	10	2	+3	2	2	0	31	12.9%
(Finland) Jarkko Immonen	(Finland) JYP	12	4	6	10	6	+3	0	1	0	37	10.81%
(Sweden) Robert Nilsson	(Switzerland) ZSC Lions	8	1	9	10	0	+6	0	0	0	14	7.14%
(Sweden) Adam Almqvist	(Sweden) Frölunda HC	7	0	10	10	4	+5	0	0	0	14	0.00%

Source: championshockeyleague.net

=== Leading goaltenders ===
Only the top five goaltenders, based on save percentage, who have played at least 40% of their team's minutes, are included in this list.

Player	Team	GP	W	L	SV	GA	SV%	GAA	SO	MIN
(Czech Republic) Šimon Hrubec	(Czech Republic) Oceláři Třinec	10	9	1	278	11	96.19%	1.07	2	615
(Switzerland) Niklas Schlegel	(Switzerland) ZSC Lions	5	3	2	83	4	95.40%	0.78	2	309
(Czech Republic) Tomáš Duba	(Austria) EC KAC	3	2	1	87	5	94.57%	1.67	0	180
(Switzerland) Lukas Flüeler	(Switzerland) ZSC Lions	5	3	2	122	8	93.85%	1.59	2	301
(Finland) Juho Olkinuora	(Finland) JYP	9	6	1	245	17	93.51%	2.06	1	495

Source: championshockeyleague.net

=== Home Game and Overall ===
As of 6 February 2018

Pos.	Team	Regular season		Playoffs		Overall			2016–17 average
Pos.	Team	Matches	Attendance	Matches	Attendance	Matches	Total	Average	2016–17 average
1	(Switzerland) SC Bern	3	25,692	2	27,392	5	53,084	10,617	9,748
2	(Germany) Adler Mannheim	3	19,141	1	4,176	4	23,317	5,829	7,354
3	(United Kingdom) Nottingham Panthers	3	13,190	1	6,598	4	19,788	4,947	–
4	(Czech Republic) Bílí Tygři Liberec	3	11,645	3	13,272	6	24,917	4,153	3,432
5	(Sweden) Växjö Lakers	3	15,584	4	13,090	7	28,674	4,096	1,862
6	(Switzerland) EV Zug	3	12,057	1	3,846	4	15,903	3,976	3,517
7	(Finland) Tappara	3	11,522	1	4,221	3	15,743	3,936	3,457
8	(Czech Republic) Oceláři Třinec	3	9,615	3	13,841	6	23,456	3,909	–
9	(Czech Republic) Kometa Brno	3	11,682	2	7,461	5	19,143	3,829	–
10	(Switzerland) ZSC Lions	3	11,232	2	6,436	5	17,668	3,534	3,075
11	(Norway) Stavanger Oilers	3	10,073	0	–	3	10,073	3,358	2,561
12	(Finland) HIFK	3	9,939	0	–	3	9,939	3,313	3,367
13	(Finland) JYP	3	10,966	3	8,242	6	19,208	3,201	2,872
14	(Czech Republic) Mountfield HK	3	9,306	0	—	3	9,306	3,102	–
15	(Poland) ComArch Cracovia	3	9,013	0	—	3	9,013	3,004	6,667
16	(Finland) TPS	3	8,916	0	—	3	8,916	2,972	1,674
17	(Austria) EC KAC	3	7,758	0	—	3	7,758	2,586	–
18	(Sweden) Frölunda HC	3	8,585	1	1,570	4	10,155	2,539	2,561
19	(Switzerland) HC Davos	3	7,472	0	–	3	7,472	2,491	2,987
20	(Wales) Cardiff Devils	3	7,307	0	—	23	7,307	2,436	–
21	(Germany) Red Bull München	3	6,880	1	2,690	4	9,570	2,393	2,440
22	(Germany) Grizzlys Wolfsburg	3	6,932	0	—	3	6,932	2,311	2,058
23	(Belarus) Neman Grodno	3	6,735	0	—	3	6,735	2,245	—
24	(Sweden) Brynäs IF	3	5,395	2	5,638	5	11,033	2,207	–
25	(Austria) Vienna Capitals	3	6,500	0	—	3	6,500	2,167	2,275
26	(Finland) KalPa	3	6,283	0	—	3	6,283	2,094	2,189
27	(Sweden) HV71	3	6,070	0	—	3	6,070	2,023	1,624
28	(Slovakia) HC '05 Banská Bystrica	3	5,891	0	—	3	5,891	1,964	–
29	(Austria) Red Bull Salzburg	3	5,256	1	2,561	4	7,817	1,954	2,334
30	(France) Rapaces de Gap	3	5,189	0	—	3	5,189	1,730	1,758
31	(Sweden) Malmö Redhawks	3	3,314	1	1,662	4	4,976	1,244	–
32	(Denmark) Esbjerg Energy	3	3,228	0	—	3	3,228	1,076	1,340
Tournament total		96	298,368	29	122,766	125	421,134	3,369	3,234

Source: Champions Hockey League.
