= Rakos =

Rakos may refer to:

People

- Daniel Rákos (born 1987), Czech ice hockey player

Places

- Rákoš, Košice-okolie District, Slovakia
- Rákoš, Revúca District, Slovakia

Other uses

- 4108 Rakos, a minor planet
