= Turkulainen =

Turkulainen is a surname. Notable people with the surname include:

- Jerry Turkulainen (born 1998), Finnish ice hockey player
- Jesse Turkulainen (born 1990), Finnish ice hockey player
