= Cienciała =

Cienciała is a Polish surname. Notable people with the surname include:

- Anna M. Cienciala (1929–2014), Polish-American historian and author
- David Cienciala (born 1995), Czech ice hockey player
- Sławomir Cienciała (born 1983), Polish footballer
