= Juuso Puustinen =

Finnish ice hockey player (born 1988)

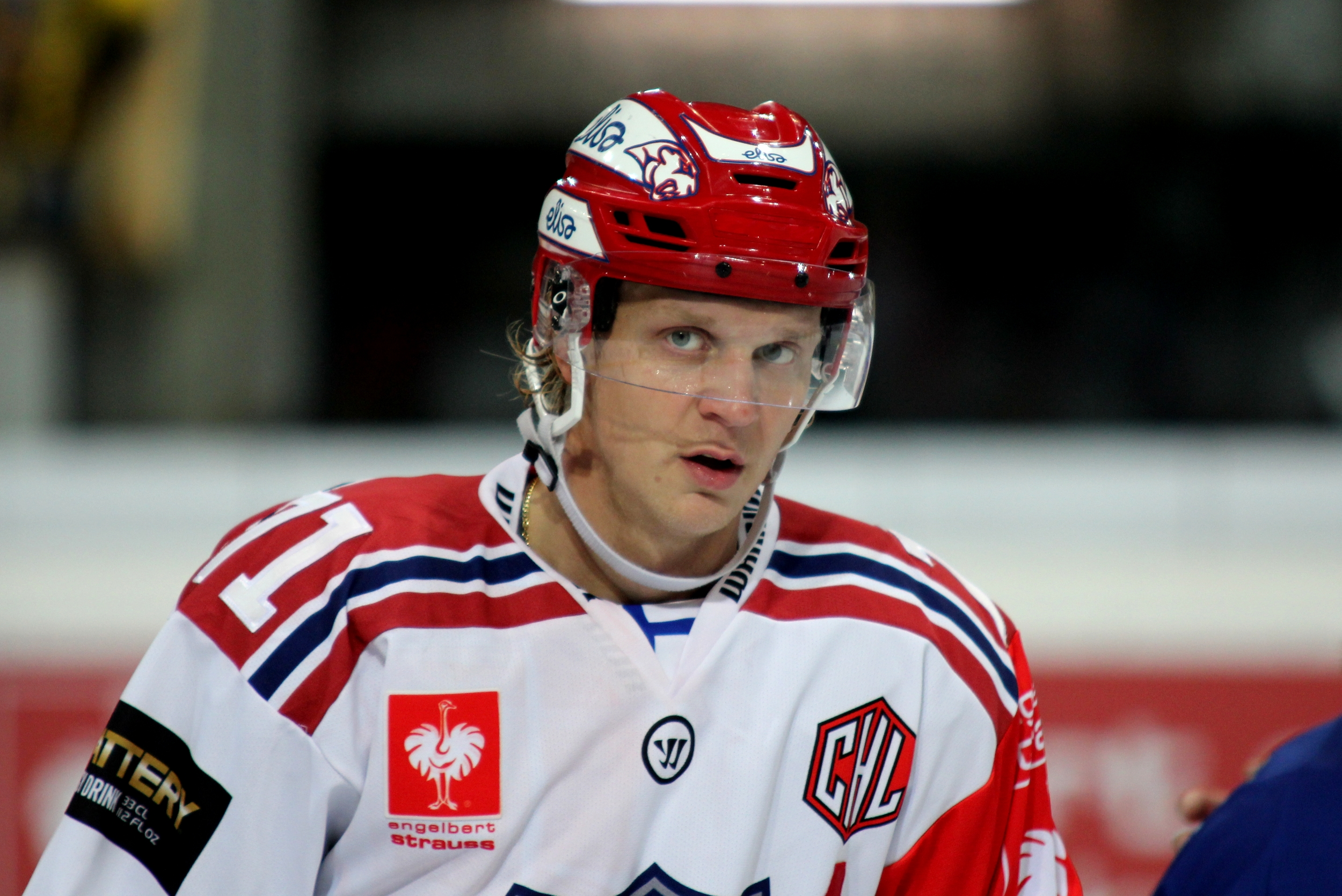
- Born: April 5, 1988 (age 38) Kuopio, Finland
- Height: 6 ft 1 in (185 cm)
- Weight: 185 lb (84 kg; 13 st 3 lb)
- Position: Right Wing
- Shoots: Right
- SHL team Former teams: Örebro HK; Espoo Blues; HPK; Milwaukee Admirals; HIFK; JYP Jyväskylä; Neftekhimik Nizhnekamsk; Sibir Novosibirsk
- NHL draft: 149th overall, 2006; Calgary Flames
- Playing career: 2008–present

Juuso Puustinen (born April 5, 1988) is a Finnish professional ice hockey forward who is currently playing for Örebro HK of the Swedish Hockey League (SHL). He was selected in fifth round, 149th overall by the Calgary Flames in the 2006 NHL entry draft.

== Playing career ==
Puustinen played two seasons of junior in North America for the Kamloops Blazers of the Western Hockey League before returning to Finland to begin his professional career in 2008.

Prior to the 2010–11 season, Puustinen signed a two-year, two-way deal with the Nashville Predators. After two seasons with the Predators AHL affiliate, the Milwaukee Admirals, Puustinen returned to Finland to sign a one-year contract with HIFK on May 25, 2013.

Following the 2017–18 season, his lone season with JYP Jyväskylä, Puustinen left the Liiga and decided to pursue a career in the KHL, securing a one-year contract with Russian club, HC Neftekhimik Nizhnekamsk on May 2, 2018.

After notching 20 goals in his debut 2018–19 season in the KHL with Neftekhimik Nizhnekamsk, Puustinen opted to continue in Russia, signing an improved one-year contract with HC Sibir Novosibirsk on May 1, 2019.

Puustinen left the KHL following his second season with Sibir Novosibirsk in 2020–21 and signed a one-year contract with Swedish SHL club, Örebro HK, on 3 July 2021.

== Career statistics ==
=== Regular season and playoffs ===
			Regular season					Playoffs
Season	Team	League	GP	G	A	Pts	PIM	GP	G	A	Pts	PIM
2004–05	KalPa	FIN U18	26	14	15	29	81	6	1	2	3	4
2004–05	KalPa	FIN U20	1	0	0	0	0	—	—	—	—	—
2005–06	KalPa	FIN U18	7	8	7	15	18	—	—	—	—	—
2005–06	KalPa	FIN U20	29	9	5	14	46	5	0	0	0	0
2006–07	Kamloops Blazers	WHL	64	32	39	71	52	4	0	3	3	4
2006–07	Suomi U20	Mestis	2	0	1	1	2	—	—	—	—	—
2007–08	Kamloops Blazers	WHL	60	27	26	53	26	4	1	1	2	2
2007–08	Suomi U20	Mestis	2	0	0	0	2	—	—	—	—	—
2008–09	Blues	SM-liiga	53	13	20	33	14	14	1	1	2	4
2009–10	Blues	SM-liiga	54	8	13	21	64	2	0	1	1	0
2010–11	HPK	SM-liiga	59	26	12	38	46	2	1	0	1	4
2011–12	Milwaukee Admirals	AHL	55	16	16	32	8	—	—	—	—	—
2012–13	Milwaukee Admirals	AHL	73	15	16	31	14	4	0	0	0	4
2013–14	HIFK	Liiga	51	23	17	40	42	2	1	0	1	2
2014–15	HIFK	Liiga	47	15	12	27	28	7	2	2	4	2
2015–16	HIFK	Liiga	50	13	14	27	18	14	4	5	9	6
2016–17	HIFK	Liiga	48	6	14	20	42	13	6	6	12	2
2017–18	JYP	Liiga	53	30	21	51	44	6	2	2	4	2
2018–19	Neftekhimik Nizhnekamsk	KHL	53	20	17	37	20	—	—	—	—	—
2019–20	Sibir Novosibirsk	KHL	58	19	17	36	14	5	4	1	5	2
2020–21	Sibir Novosibirsk	KHL	46	18	12	30	14	—	—	—	—	—
2021–22	Örebro HK	SHL	25	3	1	4	0	8	0	1	1	0
2022–23	JYP	Liiga	54	12	18	30	39	—	—	—	—	—
Liiga totals			469	146	141	287	337	60	17	17	34	22
KHL totals			157	57	46	103	48	5	4	1	5	2

Medal record

Representing Finland

Ice hockey

IIHF World U18 Championships
Silver medal – second place	2006 Sweden	

U-18 Junior World Cup
Bronze medal – third place	2005 Piešťany	

=== International ===
Year	Team	Event	Result	GP	G	A	Pts	PIM
2005	Finland	U17	6th	5	5	1	6	6
2005	Finland	U18	3rd place, bronze medalist(s)	5	1	0	1	4
2006	Finland	WJC18	2nd place, silver medalist(s)	6	1	2	3	10
2008	Finland	WJC	6th	6	4	1	5	12
Junior totals				22	11	4	15	32

== Awards and honours ==
Award	Year
CHL
Champions (JYP Jyväskylä)	2018
KHL
All-Star Game	2019
