= Antti Suomela =

Finnish ice hockey player

- Born: 17 March 1994 (age 32) Espoo, Finland
- Height: 6 ft 0 in (183 cm)
- Weight: 172 lb (78 kg; 12 st 4 lb)
- Position: Forward
- Shoots: Left
- NL team Former teams: Lausanne HC; Espoo Blues; JYP; San Jose Sharks; HIFK; IK Oskarshamn
- National team: Finland
- NHL draft: Undrafted
- Playing career: 2015–present

Antti Suomela (born 17 March 1994) is a Finnish professional ice hockey forward for Lausanne HC of the National League (NL).

== Playing career ==
Suomela made his Liiga debut playing with Espoo Blues during the 2015–16 Liiga season.

He won the Veli-Pekka Ketola trophy for the most points scored during the regular season, posting 21 goals and 60 points in 59 games in the 2017–18 Liiga season with JYP Jyväskylä. He also won the 2017–18 Champions Hockey League with JYP Jyväskylä.

Gaining NHL interest, Suomela agreed to a one-year, entry-level contract with the San Jose Sharks on 6 June 2018. After attending his first NHL training camp with the Sharks, Suomela made the opening night roster for the 2018–19 season. Suomela made his NHL a debut on 3 October, and recorded his first NHL point in a 3–2 win over the Los Angeles Kings on 5 October 2018.

He was re-signed as a restricted free agent by the Sharks to a one-year, two-way contract on 11 July 2019.

Suomela continued his tenure within the Sharks organization by signing a one-year, two-way contract on 7 October 2020. On 9 October, having remained in Finland due to the COVID-19 pandemic, Suomela was loaned by the Sharks to return to competitive hockey by joining Finnish top flight Liiga club, HIFK, on loan until the commencement of the delayed 2020–21 NHL season. In 10 appearances with HIFK, Suomela added 2 goals and 5 points before returning to the Sharks organization. He was dealt by the Sharks at the trade deadline to the Toronto Maple Leafs on 12 April 2021 in exchange for Alexander Barabanov.

With his contract concluded with the Maple Leafs, Suomela remained within the organization signing a one-year AHL contract with the Toronto Marlies on 15 June 2021.

Returning to Europe as a free agent for the 2022–23 season, Suomela signed a one-year contract in the Swedish Hockey League (SHL) with IK Oskarshamn on 12 May 2022. Rediscovering his offensive touch, Suomela quickly transitioned into Oskarshamn's top scoring threat and in 51 regular season games he finished top in the SHL in scoring with 37 goals and 66 points. He was awarded the Håkan Loob Trophy and the Guldhjälmen as the league MVP. He made three post-season appearances with Oskarshamn, however was unable to propel the club to the playoffs in losing in three games to Luleå HF in the Eighth finals.

On 13 March 2023, Suomela as a pending free agent opted to leave the SHL after just one season in signing a lucrative two-year contract with Swiss club, Lausanne HC of the National League (NL).

== Career statistics ==
Bold indicates led league

=== Regular season and playoffs ===
			Regular season					Playoffs
Season	Team	League	GP	G	A	Pts	PIM	GP	G	A	Pts	PIM
2010–11	Kiekko-Espoo	FIN U18 Q	3	0	1	1	2	—	—	—	—	—
2010–11	Kiekko-Espoo	FIN.2 U18	17	6	3	9	0	—	—	—	—	—
2011–12	Blues	FIN U18	28	3	9	12	14	12	4	1	5	16
2011–12	Blues II	FIN U18 Q	10	3	11	14	2	—	—	—	—	—
2011–12	Blues II	FIN.2 U18	5	5	3	8	0	—	—	—	—	—
2012–13	Blues	Jr. A	17	2	7	9	6	2	0	0	0	0
2012–13	Blues II	Jr. B	10	6	4	10	8	—	—	—	—	—
2013–14	Blues	Jr. A	40	11	17	28	36	11	1	5	6	6
2014–15	Blues	Jr. A	44	27	38	65	12	9	6	4	10	2
2015–16	Blues	Jr. A	6	5	7	12	2	9	3	8	11	8
2015–16	Blues	Liiga	52	13	13	26	20	—	—	—	—	—
2016–17	JYP	Liiga	58	22	23	45	37	15	4	2	6	0
2017–18	JYP	Liiga	59	21	39	60	6	6	1	2	3	0
2018–19	San Jose Sharks	NHL	27	3	5	8	4	—	—	—	—	—
2018–19	San Jose Barracuda	AHL	47	6	14	20	14	2	0	1	1	0
2019–20	San Jose Barracuda	AHL	14	5	4	9	6	—	—	—	—	—
2019–20	San Jose Sharks	NHL	20	1	6	7	4	—	—	—	—	—
2020–21	HIFK	Liiga	10	2	3	5	4	—	—	—	—	—
2020–21	San Jose Barracuda	AHL	10	1	5	6	2	—	—	—	—	—
2020–21	San Jose Sharks	NHL	4	0	0	0	0	—	—	—	—	—
2020–21	Toronto Marlies	AHL	7	0	2	2	0	—	—	—	—	—
2021–22	Toronto Marlies	AHL	48	14	12	26	10	—	—	—	—	—
2022–23	IK Oskarshamn	SHL	51	**37**	29	**66**	45	3	2	4	6	2
2023–24	Lausanne HC	NL	52	12	29	41	10	18	5	6	11	0
2024–25	Lausanne HC	NL	47	15	25	40	14	19	4	13	17	2
Liiga totals			179	58	78	136	67	21	5	4	9	0
NHL totals			51	4	11	15	8	—	—	—	—	—
SHL totals			51	37	29	66	45	3	2	4	6	2
NL totals			99	27	54	81	24	37	9	19	28	2

=== International ===
Year	Team	Event	Result	GP	G	A	Pts	PIM
2018	Finland	WC	5th	4	1	0	1	0
2023	Finland	WC	7th	5	1	3	4	2
Senior totals				9	2	3	5	2

== Awards and honours ==
Award	Year
Liiga
Veli-Pekka Ketola trophy	2018
Champions Hockey League
Champion	2017–18
SHL
Håkan Loob Trophy	2023
Guldhjälmen	2023
