= Juha-Pekka Hytönen =

Finnish ice hockey player

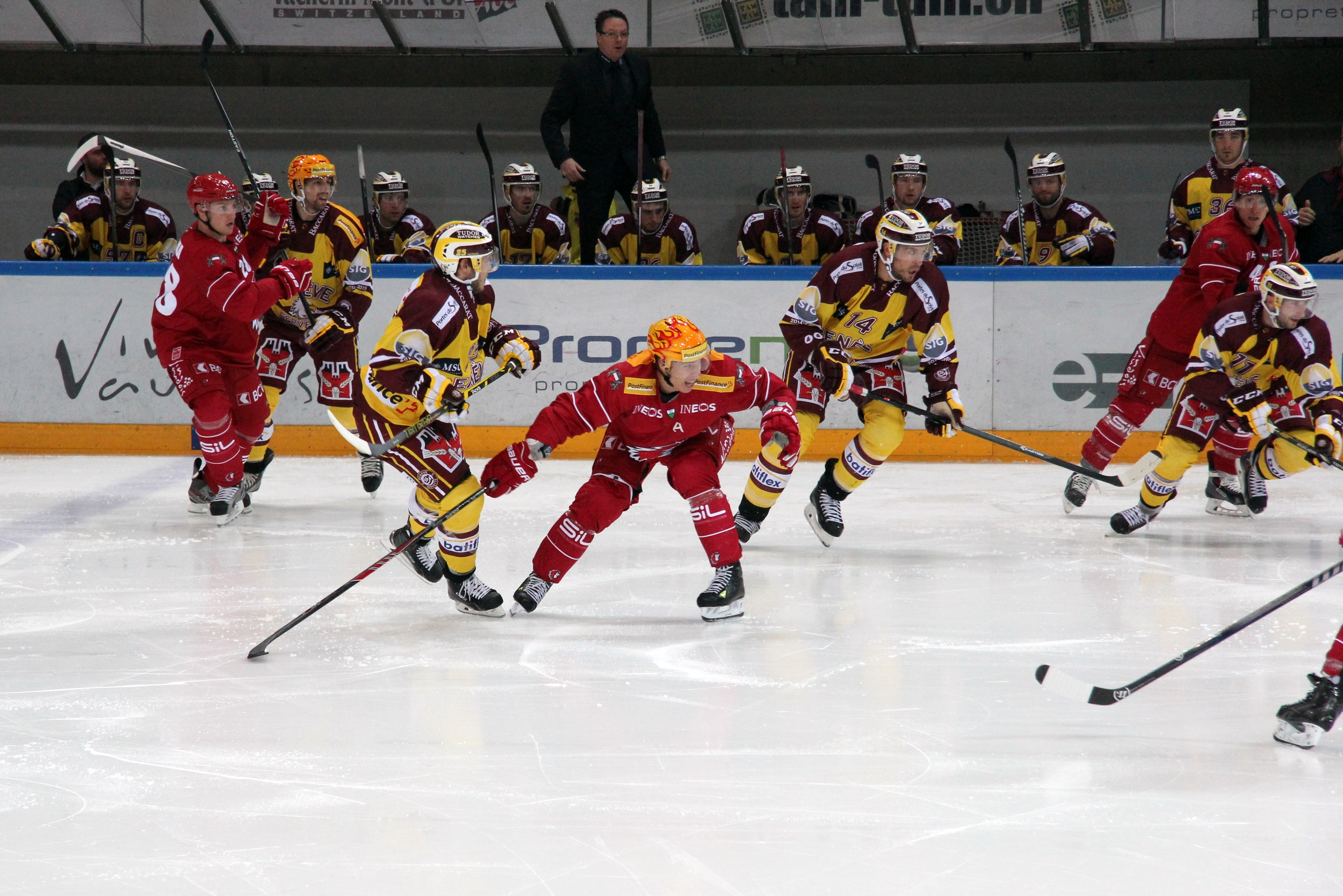
- Juha-Pekka Hytönen with LHC in 2014
- Born: May 22, 1981 (age 44); Jyväskylä, Finland
- Height: 1.78 m (5 ft 10 in)
- Weight: 84 kg (185 lb; 13 st 3 lb)
- Position: Centre
- Shoots: Left
- Liiga team Former teams: JYP Jyväskylä; Diskos; Jukurit; Amur Khabarovsk; Lausanne HC
- National team: Finland
- Playing career: 2000–present

Juha-Pekka Hytönen (born May 22, 1981) is a Finnish ice hockey forward currently playing for JYP Jyväskylä.

== Career ==
Juha-Pekka Hytönen started his career in JYP Jyväskylä junior teams. In 1999 he was chosen to Finnish national U18 team and next year to the Finnish national U20 team. In 2000 Hytönen played his first game in SM-liiga, the Finnish elite league. Before his move to KHL he played always with JYP Jyväskylä apart from one season in Jukurit and few games in Diskos both teams in Mestis.

In 2006 he became captain of JYP and played in championship-winning team in 2009. He was also chosen to Finland's squad for the World Championships that year, as well as in 2010, 2013 and 2015.

After winning another Finnish championship with JYP in 2012, Hytönen embarked on a new challenge, joining KHL side Amur Khabarovsk, where he spent the 2012-13 campaign.

In 2013 he signed a 2-year contract with Lausanne Hockey Club (LHC) in the Swiss National League A (NLA). As the team's top scorer, he helped Lausanne qualify for the playoffs for the first time in the club's history by tallying 39 points (16 goals/23 assists) in 49 games.

In 2014, he was named LHC's alternate captain along with Etienne Froidevaux. Hytönen left Lausanne after three years, opting to return to his hometown team JYP in April 2016.

== Career statistics ==
			Regular season					Playoffs
Season	Team	League	GP	G	A	Pts	PIM	GP	G	A	Pts	PIM
1996–97	JYP Jyväskylä U16	U16 SM-sarja	28	22	25	47	26	—	—	—	—	—
1997–98	JYP Jyväskylä U18	U18 SM-sarja	36	13	7	20	8	5	1	2	3	2
1998–99	JYP Jyväskylä U18	U18 SM-sarja	20	9	19	28	14	7	4	5	9	4
1999–00	JYP Jyväskylä U20	U20 SM-liiga	39	11	20	31	18	4	1	1	2	0
2000–01	JYP Jyväskylä U20	U20 SM-liiga	12	4	7	11	12	6	2	2	4	0
2000–01	JYP Jyväskylä	SM-liiga	35	1	0	1	6	—	—	—	—	—
2000–01	Diskos	Mestis	3	2	1	3	4	—	—	—	—	—
2001–02	JYP Jyväskylä U20	U20 SM-liiga	3	1	2	3	8	—	—	—	—	—
2001–02	JYP Jyväskylä	SM-liiga	55	3	6	9	10	—	—	—	—	—
2002–03	Mikkelin Jukurit	Mestis	41	12	16	28	36	12	3	2	5	6
2003–04	JYP Jyväskylä	SM-liiga	56	3	5	8	34	2	0	0	0	0
2004–05	JYP Jyväskylä	SM-liiga	56	7	12	19	26	3	0	1	1	4
2005–06	JYP Jyväskylä	SM-liiga	37	3	6	9	22	3	1	1	2	0
2006–07	JYP Jyväskylä	SM-liiga	56	11	17	28	44	—	—	—	—	—
2007–08	JYP Jyväskylä	SM-liiga	49	15	19	34	42	6	1	2	3	0
2008–09	JYP Jyväskylä	SM-liiga	58	17	15	32	22	15	1	8	9	16
2009–10	JYP Jyväskylä	SM-liiga	56	22	32	54	32	14	3	7	10	12
2010–11	JYP Jyväskylä	SM-liiga	60	18	26	44	30	10	1	2	3	6
2011–12	JYP Jyväskylä	SM-liiga	57	19	22	41	44	14	4	4	8	6
2012–13	Amur Khabarovsk	KHL	52	4	26	30	26	—	—	—	—	—
2013–14	Lausanne HC	NLA	49	16	23	39	8	6	3	5	8	0
2014–15	Lausanne HC	NLA	41	11	12	23	10	7	0	2	2	4
2015–16	Lausanne HC	NLA	48	8	13	21	24	—	—	—	—	—
2016–17	JYP Jyväskylä	Liiga	59	17	22	39	22	15	5	3	8	8
2017–18	JYP Jyväskylä	Liiga	58	14	22	36	26	6	2	1	3	6
2018–19	JYP Jyväskylä	Liiga	58	7	12	19	32	3	0	1	1	0
2019–20	JYP Jyväskylä	Liiga	59	16	15	31	14	—	—	—	—	—
2020–21	Steinbach Black Wings Linz	ICEHL	45	10	24	34	22	—	—	—	—	—
2021–22	JYP Jyväskylä	Liiga	1	1	0	1	0	—	—	—	—	—
Liiga totals			810	174	231	405	406	91	18	30	48	62

== Awards ==
Medal record

Ice hockey

Representing Finland

World Junior Championships
Silver medal – second place	2001 Russia	

World U18 Championships
Gold medal – first place	1999 Germany	

- Champions Hockey League Champion in 2017–18
- Finnish Champion (Kanada-malja) in 2008–09, 2011–12.
- Mestis Champion in 2002–03
