= Petr Jelínek =

Czech ice hockey player

- Born: 19 June 1984 (age 41) Prague, Czechoslovakia
- Height: 6 ft 2 in (188 cm)
- Position: Forward
- Shot: Left
- Played for: HC Slavia Praha; Roanoke Valley Vipers; Port Huron Flags; HC Rebel Havlíčkův Brod; MsHK Zilina; HC Stadion Litoměřice; Bílí Tygři Liberec
- Playing career: 1999–2023

Petr Jelínek (born 19 June 1984) is a Czech former professional ice hockey player.

Jelínek played previously also for Moose Jaw Warriors, Prince George Cougars, HC Slovan Ústečtí Lvi, HC Slavia Praha, HC Rebel Havlíčkův Brod and MšHK Žilina.

His father Tomáš played mainly for HC Sparta Praha and won an Olympic bronze medal with Czechoslovakia in 1992, and elder brother Tomáš Jr played mainly in the domestic lower leagues and in France.
