= Milan Mikulík =

Czech ice hockey player

- Born: November 10, 1980 (age 45) Ostrava, Czechoslovakia
- Height: 6 ft 0 in (183 cm)
- Weight: 179 lb (81 kg; 12 st 11 lb)
- Position: Forward
- Shoots: Left
- Czech Extraliga team: BK Mladá Boleslav
- Playing career: 2001–present

Milan Mikulík (born November 10, 1980) is a Czech professional ice hockey player. He played with BK Mladá Boleslav in the Czech Extraliga during the 2010–11 Czech Extraliga season.
