= Rákoš, Košice-okolie District =

Rákoš Abaújrákos
- Municipality
- Flag

- Location of Rákoš in the Košice Region Location of Rákoš in Slovakia
- Coordinates: 48.65°N 21.42°E
- Country: Slovakia
- Region: Košice Region
- District: Košice-okolie District
- First mentioned: 1387

Area
  - Total: 10.56 km^{2} (4.08 sq mi)
- Elevation: 331 m (1,086 ft)

Population (2025)
  - Total: 384
- Time zone: UTC+1 (CET)
  - Summer (DST): UTC+2 (CEST)
- Postal code: 441 6
- Area code: +421 55
- Vehicle registration plate (until 2022): KS
- Website: www.obecrakos.sk

Rákoš (Hungarian: Abaújrákos) is a village and municipality in Košice-okolie District in the Kosice Region of eastern Slovakia.

== Population ==
Population statistic (10 years)
Year	1995	2005	2015	2025
Count	317	350	343	384
Difference		+10.41%	−2%	+11.95%

Population statistic
Year	2024	2025
Count	375	384
Difference		+2.4%

It has a population of 384 people (31 December 2025).

=== Ethnicity ===
Census 2021 (1+ %)
Ethnicity	Number	Fraction
Slovak	336	93.59%
Not found out	23	6.4%
Romani	8	2.22%
Hungarian	4	1.11%
Total	359	

In year 2021 was 359 people by ethnicity 336 as Slovak, 23 as Not found out, 8 as Romani, 4 as Hungarian, 2 as Czech and 2 as Rusyn.

Note on population: The difference values of population numbers in the table "Population statistic" and in the sections "Ethnicity" & "Religion" is caused by the use of various statistical methods.

=== Religion ===
Census 2021 (1+ %)
Religion	Number	Fraction
Roman Catholic Church	218	60.72%
Calvinist Church	59	16.43%
None	32	8.91%
Not found out	19	5.29%
Greek Catholic Church	12	3.34%
Other and not ascertained christian church	4	1.11%
Evangelical Church	4	1.11%
Baptists Church	4	1.11%
Total	359	

In year 2021 was 359 people by religion 218 from Roman Catholic Church, 59 from Calvinist Church, 32 from None, 19 from Not found out, 12 from Greek Catholic Church, 4 from Other and not ascertained christian church, 4 from Evangelical Church, 4 from Baptists Church, 2 from Christian Congregations in Slovakia, 1 from Eastern Orthodox Church, 1 from Paganism and natural spirituality, 1 from Jehovah's Witnesses, 1 from Other and 1 from Ad hoc movements.
