= Vojtěch Němec =

Czech ice hockey player

- Born: December 9, 1985 (age 39) Česká Lípa, Czechoslovakia
- Height: 5 ft 9 in (175 cm)
- Weight: 154 lb (70 kg; 11 st 0 lb)
- Position: Forward
- Shot: Right
- Played for: HC Vlci Jablonec nad Nisou; HC Vrchlabí; HC Havlíčkův Brod; HC Spartak Pelhřimov; HC Slavia Praha; HC Kometa Brno; SK Horácká Slavia Třebíč; BK Mladá Boleslav; HC Plzeň; Orli Znojmo
- Playing career: 2004–2022

Vojtěch Němec (born December 9, 1985) is a Czech former professional ice hockey player. He played with HC Slavia Praha in the Czech Extraliga during the 2010–11 Czech Extraliga season.

== Career statistics ==
			Regular season					Playoffs
Season	Team	League	GP	G	A	Pts	PIM	GP	G	A	Pts	PIM
2000–01	Bili Tygri Liberec U18	Czech U18	17	1	1	2	4	—	—	—	—	—
2001–02	Bili Tygri Liberec U18	Czech U18	40	34	14	48	28	—	—	—	—	—
2001–02	Bili Tygri Liberec U20	Czech U20	—	—	—	—	—	—	—	—	—	—
2003–04	Bili Tygri Liberec U20	Czech U20	52	10	16	26	54	2	1	0	1	2
2004–05	Bili Tygri Liberec U20	Czech U20	46	17	33	50	81	6	1	1	2	2
2004–05	HC Vlci Jablonec nad Nisou	Czech3	1	0	0	0	0	—	—	—	—	—
2005–06	Bili Tygri Liberec U20	Czech U20	22	14	17	31	24	3	3	3	6	2
2005–06	HC Vlci Jablonec nad Nisou	Czech3	23	11	15	26	22	—	—	—	—	—
2005–06	HC Vrchlabi	Czech3	6	1	1	2	14	8	3	4	7	6
2006–07	HC Havlíčkův Brod	Czech2	20	1	3	4	2	—	—	—	—	—
2006–07	HC Spartak Pelhřimov	Czech3	16	8	7	15	4	—	—	—	—	—
2007–08	HC Havlíčkův Brod	Czech2	20	2	2	4	6	4	1	0	1	0
2007–08	HC Spartak Pelhřimov	Czech3	20	15	14	29	50	2	1	2	3	37
2008–09	HC Havlíčkův Brod	Czech2	44	6	7	13	16	4	0	1	1	8
2008–09	HC Spartak Pelhřimov	Czech3	2	3	0	3	2	—	—	—	—	—
2009–10	HC Havlíčkův Brod	Czech2	37	12	17	29	38	4	1	1	2	0
2009–10	HC Slavia Praha	Czech	2	0	0	0	0	1	0	0	0	0
2010–11	HC Havlíčkův Brod	Czech2	38	16	29	45	68	14	6	7	13	10
2010–11	HC Slavia Praha	Czech	2	0	0	0	2	—	—	—	—	—
2011–12	HC Havlíčkův Brod	Czech2	36	14	29	43	66	—	—	—	—	—
2011–12	HC Kometa Brno	Czech	16	2	6	8	4	7	1	1	2	4
2012–13	HC Kometa Brno	Czech	19	1	2	3	4	—	—	—	—	—
2012–13	SK Horácká Slavia Třebíč	Czech2	11	5	8	13	2	—	—	—	—	—
2013–14	HC Kometa Brno	Czech	50	20	18	38	58	16	8	6	14	4
2013–14	SK Horácká Slavia Třebíč	Czech2	3	1	1	2	2	—	—	—	—	—
2014–15	HC Kometa Brno	Czech	45	10	20	30	22	9	3	2	5	4
2015–16	HC Kometa Brno	Czech	50	16	25	41	58	2	0	1	1	4
2016–17	HC Kometa Brno	Czech	51	11	16	27	10	12	5	3	8	37
2017–18	HC Kometa Brno	Czech	34	8	5	13	16	—	—	—	—	—
2017–18	BK Mladá Boleslav	Czech	17	4	4	8	4	—	—	—	—	—
2018–19	HC Plzeň	Czech	47	20	13	33	16	14	5	4	9	6
2019–20	HC Plzeň	Czech	44	10	14	24	16	—	—	—	—	—
2020–21	Orli Znojmo	Czech3	—	—	—	—	—	—	—	—	—	—
2020–21	SK Horácká Slavia Třebíč	Czech2	6	0	5	5	0	—	—	—	—	—
2020–21	HC Kometa Brno	Czech	14	3	0	3	0	6	0	1	1	0
2020–21	Orli Znojmo	ICEHL	27	6	12	18	35	—	—	—	—	—
Czech totals			391	105	123	228	210	67	22	18	40	59
Czech2 totals			215	57	101	158	200	26	8	9	17	18
