= Petr Kolmann =

Czech ice hockey player

- Born: September 20, 1988 (age 37) Liberec, Czechoslovakia
- Height: 6 ft 3 in (191 cm)
- Weight: 216 lb (98 kg; 15 st 6 lb)
- Position: Defence
- Shoots: Left
- ELH team: HC Bílí Tygři Liberec
- Playing career: 2008–present

Petr Kolmann (born September 20, 1988) is a Czech professional ice hockey defenceman. He is currently playing with the HC Bílí Tygři Liberec of the Czech Extraliga (ELH).

Kolmann made his Czech Extraliga debut playing with HC Bílí Tygři Liberec during the 2008–09 Czech Extraliga season.
