= Tomáš Linhart =

Czech ice hockey player

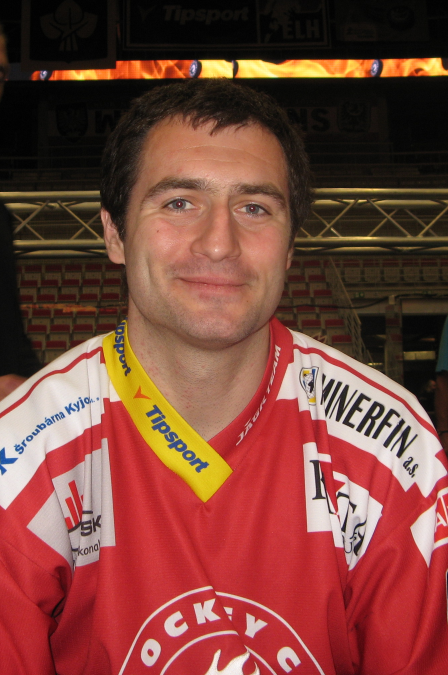
- Portrait of Tomáš Linhart
- Born: 16 February 1984 (age 42) Pardubice, Czechoslovakia
- Height: 6 ft 2 in (188 cm)
- Weight: 220 lb (100 kg; 15 st 10 lb)
- Position: Defence
- Shoots: Left
- Czech Extraliga team: HC Zlín
- NHL draft: 45th overall, 2002; Montreal Canadiens
- Playing career: 2003–present

Tomáš Linhart (born 16 February 1984) is a Czech professional ice hockey defenceman. Linhart played with HC Zlín in the Czech Extraliga from 2006 to 2009, and during the 2010–11 Czech Extraliga season. He was selected in the second round, 45th overall, by the Montreal Canadiens in the 2002 NHL entry draft.

== Career statistics ==
=== Regular season and playoffs ===
			Regular season					Playoffs
Season	Team	League	GP	G	A	Pts	PIM	GP	G	A	Pts	PIM
1999–2000	HC IPB Pojišťovna Pardubice	CZE U18	45	2	8	10	83	—	—	—	—	—
2000–01	HC IPB Pojišťovna Pardubice	CZE U18	22	5	7	12	82	1	0	0	0	0
2000–01	HC IPB Pojišťovna Pardubice	CZE U20	22	1	3	4	10	7	0	3	3	2
2001–02	HC IPB Pojišťovna Pardubice	CZE U20	36	2	3	5	28	2	0	1	1	0
2001–02	HC Papíroví Draci Šumperk	CZE.2	1	0	0	0	2	—	—	—	—	—
2002–03	Mississauga IceDogs	OHL	27	0	2	2	15	—	—	—	—	—
2002–03	London Knights	OHL	28	0	2	2	15	1	0	0	0	0
2003–04	HC Moeller Pardubice	CZE U20	24	3	6	9	67	—	—	—	—	—
2003–04	HC Moeller Pardubice	ELH	6	0	0	0	0	5	0	0	0	2
2003–04	HC VČE Hradec Králové, a.s.	CZE.2	24	1	1	2	12	3	0	0	0	0
2004–05	HC Moeller Pardubice	CZE U20	2	0	1	1	8	—	—	—	—	—
2004–05	HC Moeller Pardubice	ELH	29	1	1	2	14	16	0	0	0	2
2004–05	HC VČE Hradec Králové, a.s.	CZE.2	16	0	3	3	20	5	0	1	1	35
2005–06	HC Moeller Pardubice	ELH	49	1	1	2	36	—	—	—	—	—
2005–06	HC VČE Hradec Králové, a.s.	CZE.2	16	1	6	7	26	3	0	0	0	0
2006–07	HC Moeller Pardubice	ELH	51	1	2	3	48	18	2	0	2	10
2006–07	HC VČE Hradec Králové, a.s.	CZE.2	4	0	3	3	4	—	—	—	—	—
2007–08	HC Moeller Pardubice	ELH	52	4	0	4	66	—	—	—	—	—
2008–09	RI Okna Zlín	ELH	43	1	4	5	30	4	0	0	0	2
2009–10	PSG Zlín	ELH	52	5	6	11	81	6	0	4	4	6
2010–11	PSG Zlín	ELH	52	3	15	18	30	4	0	0	0	2
2011–12	PSG Zlín	ELH	49	5	6	11	62	9	1	3	4	16
2012–13	PSG Zlín	ELH	50	3	21	24	93	17	2	3	5	30
2013–14	HC Oceláři Třinec	ELH	52	0	8	8	42	11	1	2	3	14
2014–15	HC Oceláři Třinec	ELH	51	0	4	4	62	18	2	3	5	14
2015–16	HC Oceláři Třinec	ELH	42	1	12	13	12	—	—	—	—	—
2016–17	HC Oceláři Třinec	ELH	45	3	16	19	30	4	0	0	0	6
2017–18	HC Oceláři Třinec	ELH	50	3	11	14	40	18	1	3	4	34
2018–19	Mountfield HK	ELH	48	3	4	7	24	4	0	1	1	2
2019–20	Mountfield HK	ELH	21	0	2	2	2	—	—	—	—	—
2020–21	HC Stadion Vrchlabí	CZE.2	33	6	12	18	55	6	0	1	1	8
2021–22	HC Stadion Vrchlabí	CZE.2	31	2	11	13	22	—	—	—	—	—
ELH totals			742	34	113	147	672	134	9	19	28	140
CZE.2 totals			125	10	36	46	141	17	0	2	2	43

=== International ===
Year	Team	Event	GP	G	A	Pts	PIM
2004	Czech Republic	WJC	7	0	0	0	4
Junior totals			7	0	0	0	4
