= Lukáš Nahodil =

Czech ice hockey player

- Born: 28 July 1988 (age 36); Třebíč, Czechoslovakia
- Height: 6 ft 1 in (185 cm)
- Weight: 163 lb (74 kg; 11 st 9 lb)
- Position: Forward
- Shoots: Right
- Czech Extraliga team: HC Olomouc
- Played for: HC Pardubice SK Horácká Slavia Třebíč HC Chrudim HC Rebel Havlíčkův Brod HC Kometa Brno BK Mladá Boleslav
- Playing career: 2008–present

Lukáš Nahodil (born 28 July 1988) is a Czech professional ice hockey player. He formerly played with HC Pardubice in the Czech Extraliga during the 2010–11 Czech Extraliga season.

He currently playing HC Olomouc during 2018-19 Czech Extraliga season.
