= Jesse Turkulainen =

Finnish ice hockey player

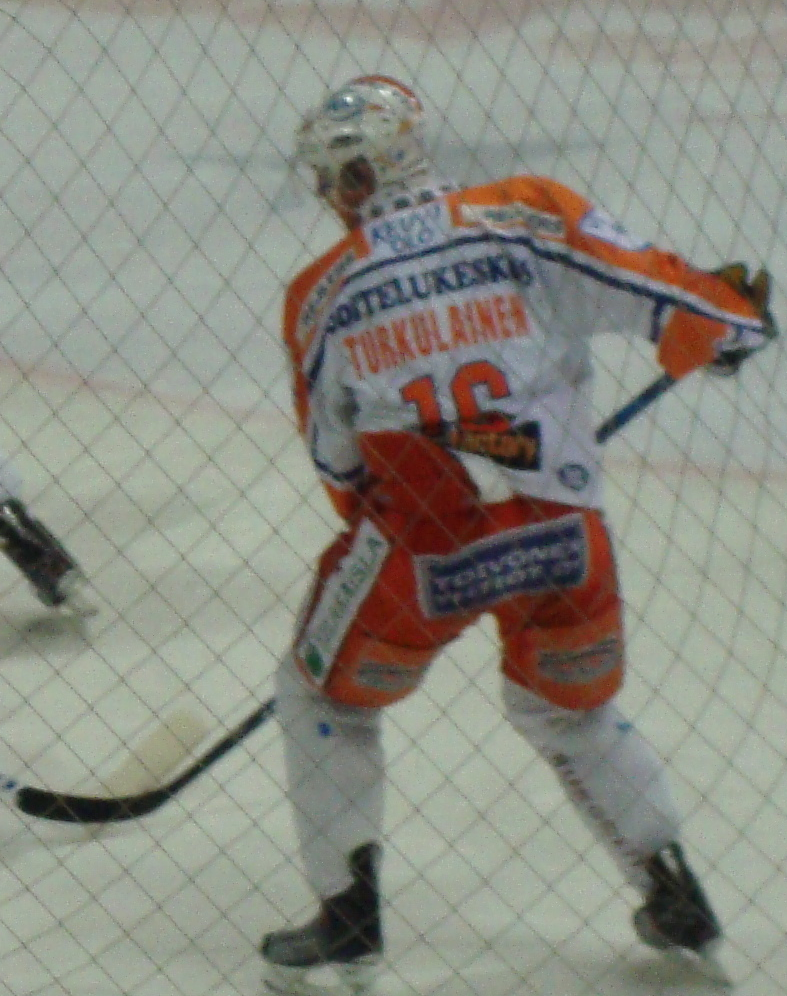
- Born: 1990; Stockholm, Sweden
- Height: 6 ft 3 in (191 cm)
- Weight: 203 lb (92 kg; 14 st 7 lb)
- Position: Defence
- Shoots: Left
- SM-liiga team: Tappara
- Playing career: 2008–present

Jesse Turkulainen is a Finnish ice hockey player who currently plays professionally in Finland for Tappara of the SM-liiga. Born in Sweden to Finnish parents, Turkulainen has lived most of his life in Sweden, and holds both Finnish and Swedish citizenship.

== See also ==
- Ice hockey in Finland
