= Tomáš Bartejs =

Czech ice hockey player

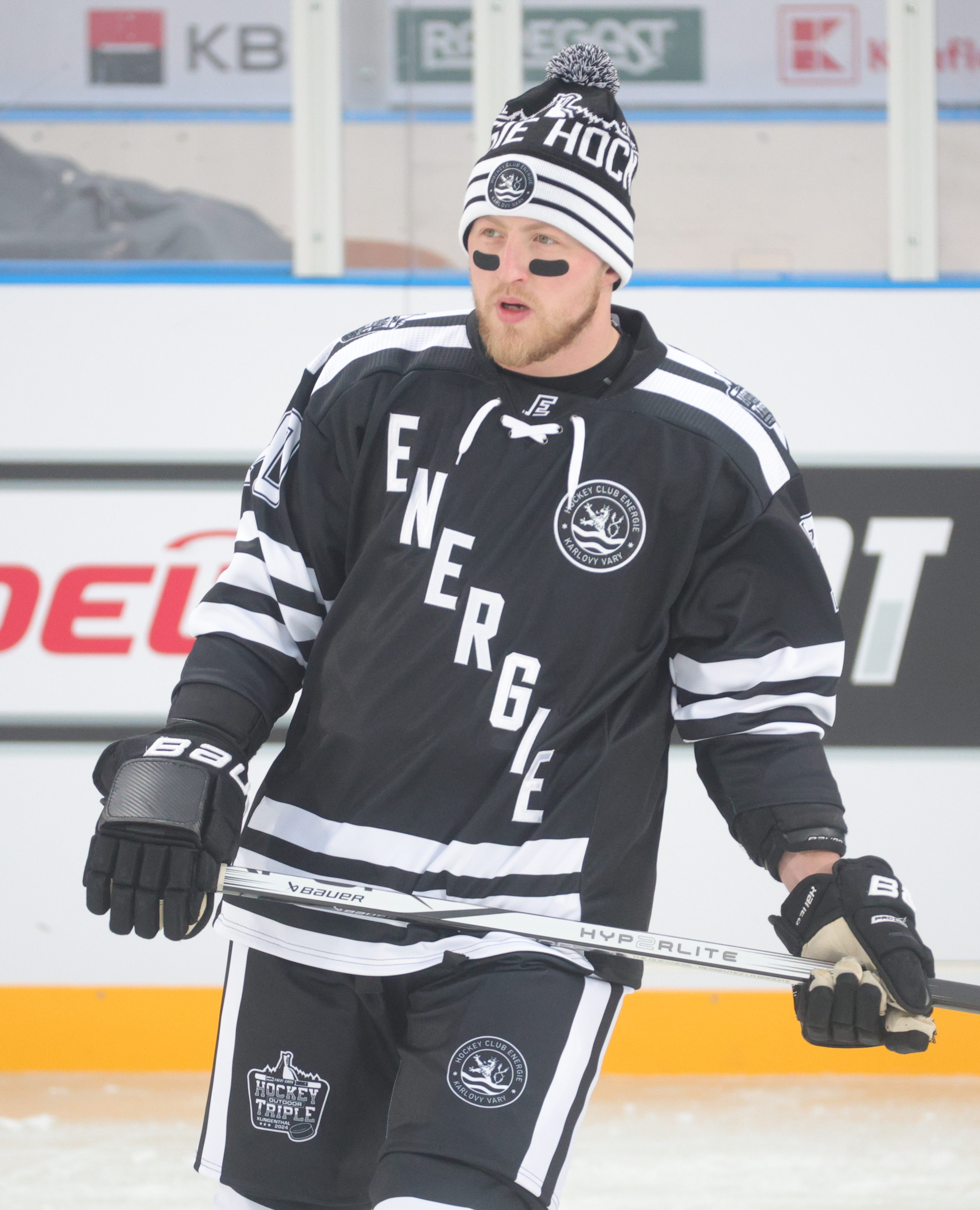
- Bartejs in 2024
- Born: 4 September 1992 (age 33) Třebíč, Czechoslovakia
- Height: 5 ft 11 in (180 cm)
- Weight: 172 lb (78 kg; 12 st 4 lb)
- Position: Defence
- Shoots: Left
- ELH team Former teams: HC Kometa Brno; SK Horácká Slavia Třebíč; HC Bílí Tygři Liberec; Piráti Chomutov; SK Kadaň; Metallurg Zhlobin
- Playing career: 2012–present

Tomáš Bartejs (born 4 September 1992) is a Czech professional ice hockey defenceman. He currently plays for HC Kometa Brno in the Czech Extraliga (ELH).

== Career ==
Bartejs made his Czech Extraliga debut playing with Piráti Chomutov debut during the 2012–13 Czech Extraliga season. He has two gold medals with HC Kometa Brno in 2016–17 Czech Extraliga season and 2017–18 Czech Extraliga season.

== Career statistics ==
=== Regular season and playoffs ===
			Regular season					Playoffs
Season	Team	League	GP	G	A	Pts	PIM	GP	G	A	Pts	PIM
