= Janne Kolehmainen =

Finnish ice hockey player

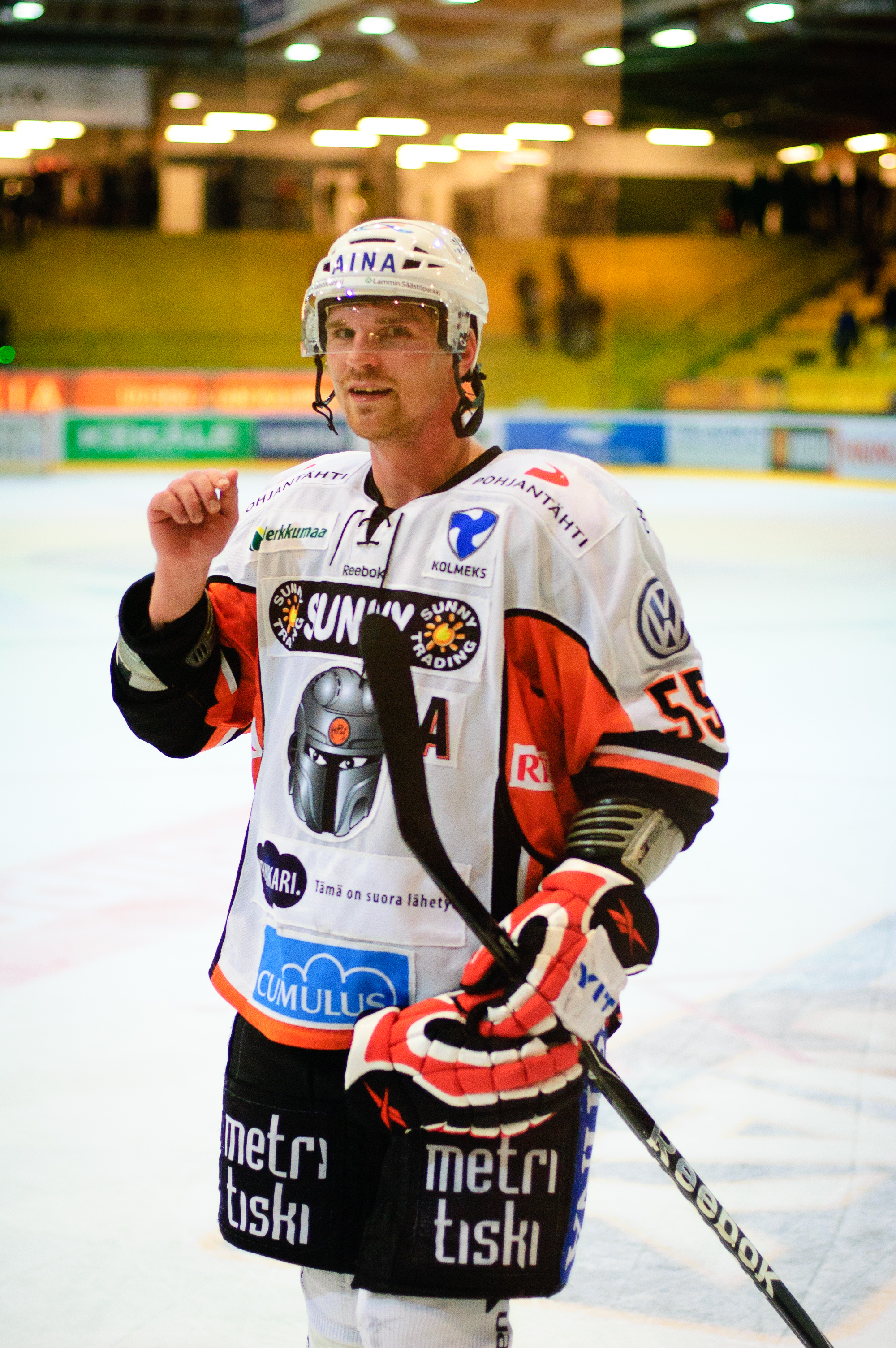
- Born: March 22, 1986 (age 38); Lappeenranta, Finland
- Height: 6 ft 3 in (191 cm)
- Weight: 209 lb (95 kg; 14 st 13 lb)
- Position: Forward
- Shot: Left
- Played for: SaiPa; HPK; KalPa; Sheffield Steelers
- NHL draft: 115th overall, 2005; Ottawa Senators
- Playing career: 2003–2020

Janne Kolehmainen (born March 22, 1986) is a Finnish professional ice hockey forward. He most recently played with the Sheffield Steelers in the UK EIHL. He previously iced with Jyp in the Finnish Liiga. Kolehmainen was originally drafted by the Ottawa Senators 115th overall in the 2005 NHL Draft but did not sign.

He previously played for SaiPa and HPK of the SM-liiga.

== Career statistics ==
=== Regular season and playoffs ===
			Regular season					Playoffs
Season	Team	League	GP	G	A	Pts	PIM	GP	G	A	Pts	PIM
2002–03	SaiPa	FIN U18	23	11	8	19	77	—	—	—	—	—
2002–03	SaiPa	FIN U20	1	0	0	0	0	—	—	—	—	—
2003–04	SaiPa	FIN U18	6	3	1	4	18	—	—	—	—	—
2003–04	SaiPa	FIN U20	30	4	7	11	26	4	3	0	3	4
2003–04	SaiPa	SM-l	6	0	0	0	2	—	—	—	—	—
2004–05	SaiPa	FIN U20	13	2	4	6	24	—	—	—	—	—
2004–05	SaiPa	SM-l	29	1	1	2	8	—	—	—	—	—
2005–06	SaiPa	FIN U20	13	3	2	5	12	—	—	—	—	—
2005–06	SaiPa	SM-l	36	0	2	2	45	8	0	1	1	4
2005–06	Suomi U20	Mestis	3	0	0	0	2	—	—	—	—	—
2006–07	SaiPa	FIN U20	1	0	0	0	0	—	—	—	—	—
2006–07	SaiPa	SM-l	50	4	5	9	40	—	—	—	—	—
2007–08	SaiPa	SM-l	54	6	5	11	34	—	—	—	—	—
2008–09	HPK	SM-l	56	5	5	10	53	6	0	0	0	8
2009–10	HPK	SM-l	50	4	4	8	53	17	1	1	2	33
2010–11	HPK	SM-l	58	12	9	21	60	2	0	0	0	2
2011–12	HPK	SM-l	54	11	4	15	20	—	—	—	—	—
2012–13	KalPa	SM-l	57	8	8	16	54	5	0	0	0	4
2013–14	KalPa	Liiga	53	6	5	11	69	—	—	—	—	—
2014–15	KalPa	Liiga	57	9	7	16	94	6	0	0	0	4
2015–16	JYP	Liiga	31	7	5	12	18	13	1	3	4	10
2016–17	JYP	Liiga	55	6	3	9	28	15	0	1	1	8
2017–18	JYP	Liiga	47	4	9	13	61	6	1	0	1	10
2018–19	JYP	Liiga	57	3	2	5	16	3	0	1	1	2
2019–20	Sheffield Steelers	GBR	23	2	1	3	10	—	—	—	—	—
Liiga totals			750	86	74	160	655	81	3	7	10	85

=== International ===
Year	Team	Event	GP	G	A	Pts	PIM
2004	Finland	WJC18	6	1	1	2	4
2005	Finland	WJC	6	1	0	1	2
2006	Finland	WJC	7	2	1	3	14
Junior totals			19	4	2	6	20
