= Karel Plášek =

Czech professional ice hockey player (born 1973)

- Born: October 16, 1973 (age 52) Gottwaldov, Czechoslovakia
- Height: 5 ft 11 in (180 cm)
- Weight: 183 lb (83 kg; 13 st 1 lb)
- Position: Forward
- Shot: Left
- Played for: HC Pardubice; HC Znojemští Orli; HC Vítkovice; HC Plzeň; HC Zubr Přerov; Draci Šumperk; IHC Písek; HC Kohouti Česká Třebová
- Playing career: 1990–2020

Karel Plášek (born October 16, 1973) is a Czech former professional ice hockey player, who last played for HC Kohouti Česká Třebová in the Krajské hokejové přebory in 2019–20 season.

Plášek previously played for in the Czech Extraliga for HC Pardubice, HC Znojemští Orli, HC Vítkovice, HC Plzeň, HC Přerov, Draci Šumperk and IHC Písek.

== Career statistics ==
			Regular season					Playoffs
Season	Team	League	GP	G	A	Pts	PIM	GP	G	A	Pts	PIM
1996–97	HC Pardubice	ELH	48	12	8	20	18	8	2	1	3	0
1996–97	HC Přerov	CZE1	1	2	3	5	—	—	—	—	—	—
1997–98	HC Pardubice	ELH	48	8	12	20	20	3	0	0	0	25
1998–99	HC Pardubice	ELH	45	11	5	16	12	3	0	0	0	0
1999–00	HC Znojemští Orli	ELH	50	8	11	19	6	—	—	—	—	—
2000–01	HC Znojemští Orli	ELH	30	13	10	23	6	7	2	0	2	2
2001–02	HC Znojemští Orli	ELH	46	10	9	19	12	4	1	0	1	2
2002–03	HC Znojemští Orli	ELH	47	12	12	24	20	6	0	0	0	0
2003–04	HC Znojemští Orli	ELH	51	12	10	24	22	7	1	1	2	4
2004–05	HC Znojemští Orli	ELH	52	9	10	19	14	—	—	—	—	—
2005–06	HC Znojemští Orli	ELH	52	7	16	23	18	10	1	1	2	2
2006–07	HC Znojemští Orli	ELH	44	5	10	15	28	4	1	0	1	0
2007–08	HC Znojemští Orli	ELH	52	5	7	12	36	3	0	1	1	2
2008–09	HC Znojemští Orli	ELH	45	7	9	16	24	—	—	—	—	—
2009–10	Orli Znojmo	CZE1	35	11	11	22	32	6	1	0	1	4
2009–10	HC Vítkovice	ELH	—	—	—	—	—	8	0	1	1	4
2010–11	Orli Znojmo	CZE1	29	8	9	17	12	3	1	0	1	0
2010–11	IHC KONTERM Písek	CZE1	7	4	1	5	0	—	—	—	—	—
2010–11	HC Plzeň	ELH	22	1	0	1	8	3	0	0	0	0
2011–12	Salith Šumperk	CZE1	51	13	18	31	20	—	—	—	—	—
2012–13	Salith Šumperk	CZE1	46	14	16	30	26	—	—	—	—	—
2013–14	Salith Šumperk	CZE1	49	13	20	33	22	—	—	—	—	—
2014–15	Salith Šumperk	CZE1	49	13	15	28	16	—	—	—	—	—
2015–16	Salith Šumperk	CZE1	48	3	8	11	20	—	—	—	—	—
2016–17	HC Zubr Přerov	CZE1	49	11	12	23	20	7	3	4	7	4
2017–18	HC Zubr Přerov	CZE1	43	5	10	15	18	4	0	0	0	0
2018–19	Draci Šumperk	CZE2	38	15	25	40	20	9	2	3	5	4
2019–20	HC Kohouti Česká Třebová	CZE3	7	2	3	5	4	8	3	3	6	2
Totals			1,084	234	280	516	454	103	18	15	33	55
