= Lukáš Krenželok =

Czech ice hockey player

- Born: June 30, 1983 (age 42) Ostrava, Czechoslovakia
- Height: 6 ft 2 in (188 cm)
- Weight: 225 lb (102 kg; 16 st 1 lb)
- Position: Left wing
- Shoots: Left
- Czech.1 team Former teams: HC Poruba 2011; HC Vítkovice; HC Slavia Praha; Bílí Tygři Liberec
- Playing career: 2001–present

Lukáš Krenželok (born 30 June 1983, in Ostrava) is a Czech professional ice hockey forward who currently plays for HC Poruba 2011 of the Czech 1. Liga.

He previously played for HC Havířov, HC Vítkovice and HC Slavia Praha in the Czech Extraliga.
