= Joel Persson =

Swedish ice hockey player (born 1994)

- Born: 4 March 1994 (age 32) Kristianstad, Sweden
- Height: 185 cm (6 ft 1 in)
- Weight: 89 kg (196 lb; 14 st 0 lb)
- Position: Defence
- Shoots: Right
- SHL team Former teams: Växjö Lakers; Edmonton Oilers
- National team: Sweden
- NHL draft: Undrafted
- Playing career: 2011–present

Joel Persson (born 4 March 1994) is a Swedish professional ice hockey player who is a defenceman for the Växjö Lakers of the Swedish Hockey League (SHL).

== Playing career ==
Persson began his senior career with Kristianstads IK, while also working as a teacher. Following the 2016–17 season in the Hockeyettan (3rd tier) where Persson scored 40 points in 38 games, he was signed by the Växjö Lakers of the Swedish Hockey League (SHL) to a three-year contract on 27 April 2017.

In the 2017–18 season, Persson made his debut in the top tier SHL appearing in 51 games for Växjö. He posted 28 assists for 34 points in the regular season before also contributing with five points in 13 playoff games, helping Växjö capture the Le Mat Trophy.

On 18 May 2018, Persson was signed to a one-year contract by the Edmonton Oilers of the National Hockey League (NHL). The Oilers immediately announced that Persson would be loaned back to the Växjö Lakers for the 2018–19 season.

Persson made his NHL debut with the Oilers on 5 October 2019 in a 6–5 win over the Los Angeles Kings. On 8 November, he recorded his first career points (two assists) in a 4–0 win over the New Jersey Devils. Persson also skated in 27 games for the Oilers' American Hockey League (AHL) affiliate, the Bakersfield Condors.

On 24 February 2020, Persson was traded to the Anaheim Ducks in exchange for Angus Redmond and a 2022 conditional seventh-round pick. He was assigned directly to AHL affiliate, the San Diego Gulls, featuring in 7 games before the remainder of the season was cancelled due to COVID-19.

On 6 June 2020, Persson as a restricted free agent from the Ducks, signed a three-year contract to return to Sweden with his former club, Växjö Lakers of the SHL. His NHL rights' were later relinquished by the Anaheim Ducks.

== Career statistics ==
			Regular season					Playoffs
Season	Team	League	GP	G	A	Pts	PIM	GP	G	A	Pts	PIM
2011–12	Kristianstads IK	Div.1	17	0	1	1	0	—	—	—	—	—
2012–13	Kristianstads IK	Div.1	25	0	2	2	2	—	—	—	—	—
2012–13	Osby IK	Div.2	15	2	7	9	12	—	—	—	—	—
2013–14	Kristianstads IK	Div.1	10	0	1	1	6	—	—	—	—	—
2013–14	Osby IK	Div.2	26	3	13	16	18	6	5	11	16	12
2014–15	Tyringe SoSS	Div.2	36	11	35	46	4	12	1	8	9	4
2015–16	Tyringe SoSS	Div.1	31	6	10	16	10	—	—	—	—	—
2016–17	Kristianstads IK	Div.1	38	10	30	40	6	14	2	11	13	4
2017–18	Växjö Lakers	SHL	51	6	28	34	8	13	1	4	5	0
2018–19	Växjö Lakers	SHL	50	6	25	31	8	—	—	—	—	—
2019–20	Edmonton Oilers	NHL	13	0	2	2	2	—	—	—	—	—
2019–20	Bakersfield Condors	AHL	27	3	13	16	12	—	—	—	—	—
2019–20	San Diego Gulls	AHL	7	0	0	0	2	—	—	—	—	—
2020–21	Växjö Lakers	SHL	52	8	28	36	10	14	0	7	7	4
2021–22	Växjö Lakers	SHL	50	8	31	39	10	4	2	3	5	0
2022–23	Växjö Lakers	SHL	51	6	30	36	12	18	2	6	8	2
2023–24	Växjö Lakers	SHL	52	7	30	37	8	8	0	2	2	0
2024–25	Växjö Lakers	SHL	43	3	20	23	12	7	1	4	5	0
SHL totals			349	44	192	236	68	64	6	26	32	6
NHL totals			13	0	2	2	2	—	—	—	—	—

=== International ===
Year	Team	Event	Result	GP	G	A	Pts	PIM
2026	Sweden	WC	7th	8	1	3	4	2
Senior totals				8	1	3	4	2

== Awards and honours ==
Award	Year
SHL
Le Mat Trophy (Växjö Lakers)	2018, 2021, 2023
Defenseman of the Year	2024
Guldhjälmen	2024
