= Jerry Turkulainen =

Finnish ice hockey player

- Born: 23 September 1998 (age 26); Mikkeli, Finland
- Height: 5 ft 7 in (170 cm)
- Weight: 159 lb (72 kg; 11 st 5 lb)
- Position: Left wing
- Shoots: Right
- NL team Former teams: HC Ajoie; JYP Jyväskylä
- Playing career: 2016–present

Jerry Turkulainen (born 23 September 1998) is a Finnish professional ice hockey player who currently plays as a left wing for HC Ajoie of the National League (NL).

== Career statistics ==
			Regular season					Playoffs
Season	Team	League	GP	G	A	Pts	PIM	GP	G	A	Pts	PIM
2016–17	JYP	Liiga	48	9	17	26	6	8	1	0	1	4
2016–17	JYP-Akatemia	Mestis	8	0	5	5	0	-	-	-	-	-
2016-17	JYP	CHL	4	0	1	1	2	-	-	-	-	-
2017–18	JYP	Liiga	52	10	23	33	18	6	0	3	3	4
2017-18	JYP	CHL	12	2	6	8	8	-	-	-	-	-
2018–19	JYP	Liiga	59	7	17	24	18	3	1	1	2	4
2018-19	JYP	CHL	6	0	4	4	2	-	-	-	-	-
2019–20	JYP	Liiga	58	11	31	42	20	-	-	-	-	-
2020–21	JYP	Liiga	57	15	25	40	36	-	-	-	-	-
2021–22	JYP	Liiga	53	16	22	38	18	-	-	-	-	-
2022–23	JYP	Liiga	60	12	42	54	20	-	-	-	-	-
2023–24	JYP	Liiga	60	21	42	63	18	-	-	-	-	-
Liiga totals			447	101	219	320	154	17	2	4	6	12
