= Jaakko Jokinen =

Finnish ice hockey player

- Born: 17 July 1993 (age 31); Jämsä, Finland
- Height: 6 ft 2 in (188 cm)
- Weight: 205 lb (93 kg; 14 st 9 lb)
- Position: Defenceman
- Shoots: Left
- Liiga team: JYP Jyväskylä
- Playing career: 2015–present

Jaakko Jokinen (born 17 July 1993) is a Finnish ice hockey player who plays as a defenceman for JYP Jyväskylä.
