= Martin Adamský =

Czech ice hockey player (born 1981)

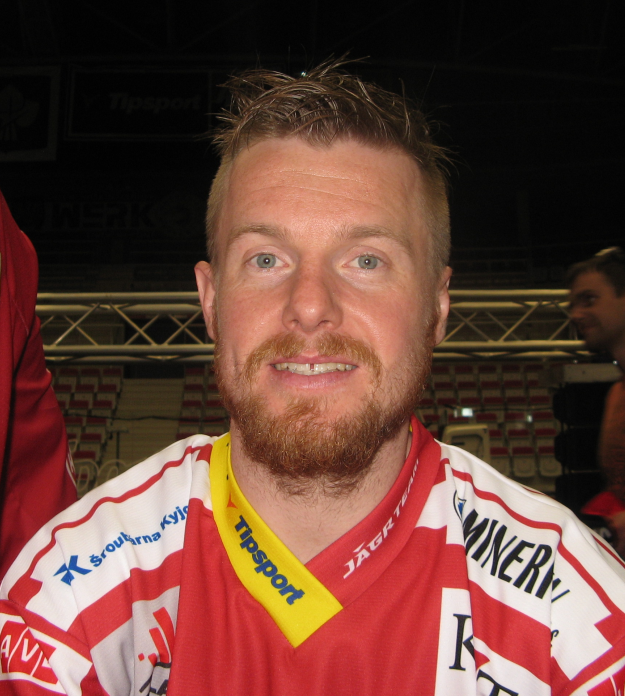
- Born: July 13, 1981 (age 44) Studénka, Czechoslovakia
- Height: 6 ft 2 in (188 cm)
- Weight: 203 lb (92 kg; 14 st 7 lb)
- Position: Forward
- Shoots: Left
- Czech Extraliga team: HC Oceláři Třinec
- National team: Czech Republic
- NHL draft: Undrafted
- Playing career: 2001–present

Martin Adamský (born 13 July 1981) is a Czech professional ice hockey player. He notably played 10 seasons for HC Oceláři Třinec in the Czech Extraliga, winning the Extraliga twice.

He started with HC Oceláři Třinec during the 2010–11 season.
