= Tomáš Havlín =

Czech ice hockey player

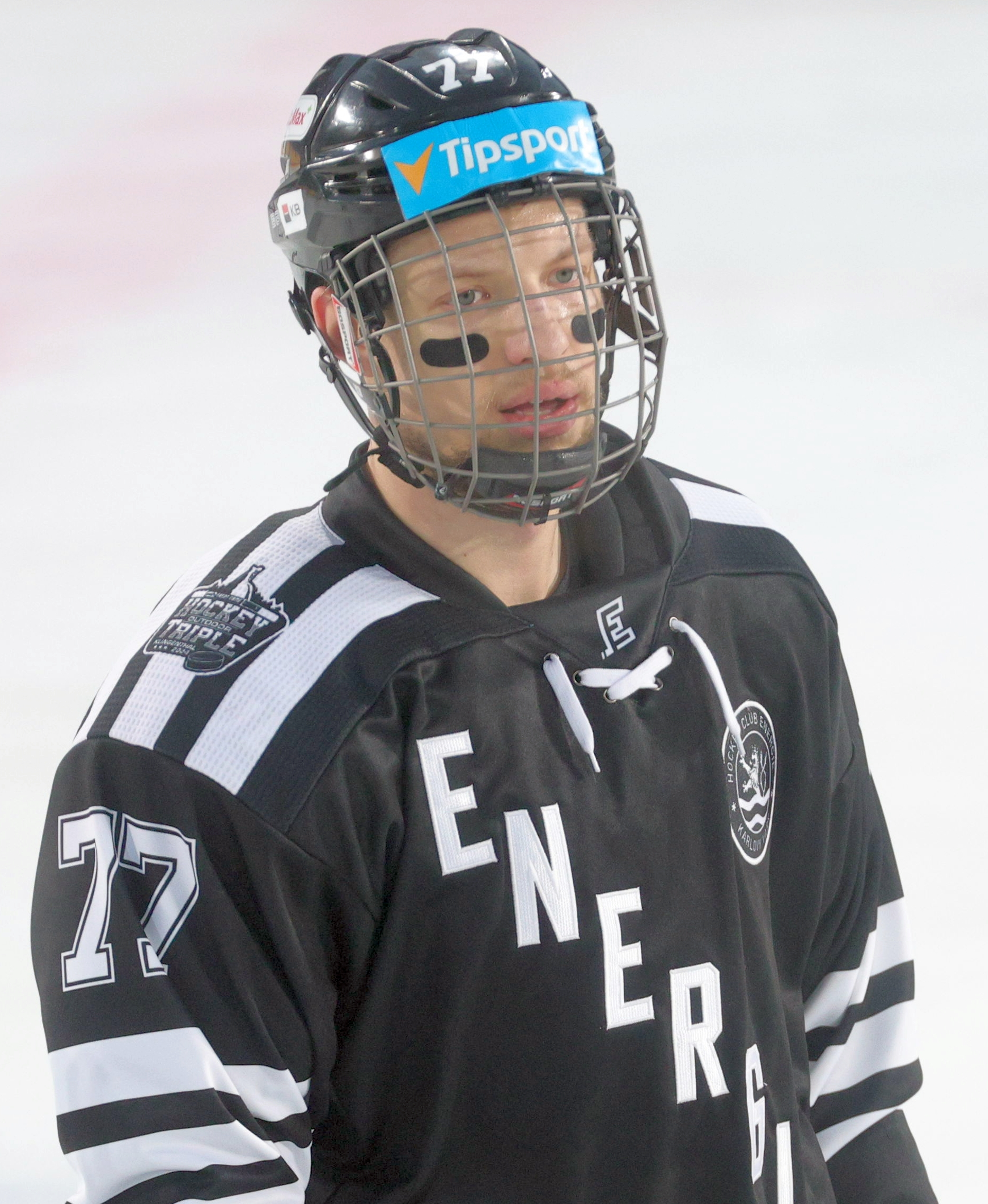
- Havlín in 2024
- Born: 13 July 1996 (age 29) Jablonec nad Nisou, Czech Republic
- Height: 6 ft 3 in (191 cm)
- Weight: 212 lb (96 kg; 15 st 2 lb)
- Position: Defenseman
- Shoots: Left
- Czech team: HC Bílí Tygři Liberec
- Playing career: 2013–present

Tomáš Havlín (born 13 July 1996) is a Czech professional ice hockey player. He is currently playing for HC Bílí Tygři Liberec of the Czech Extraliga.

Havlín made his Czech Extraliga debut playing with HC Bílí Tygři Liberec during the 2015-16 Czech Extraliga season.
