= Martin Bakoš =

Slovak ice hockey player (born 1990)

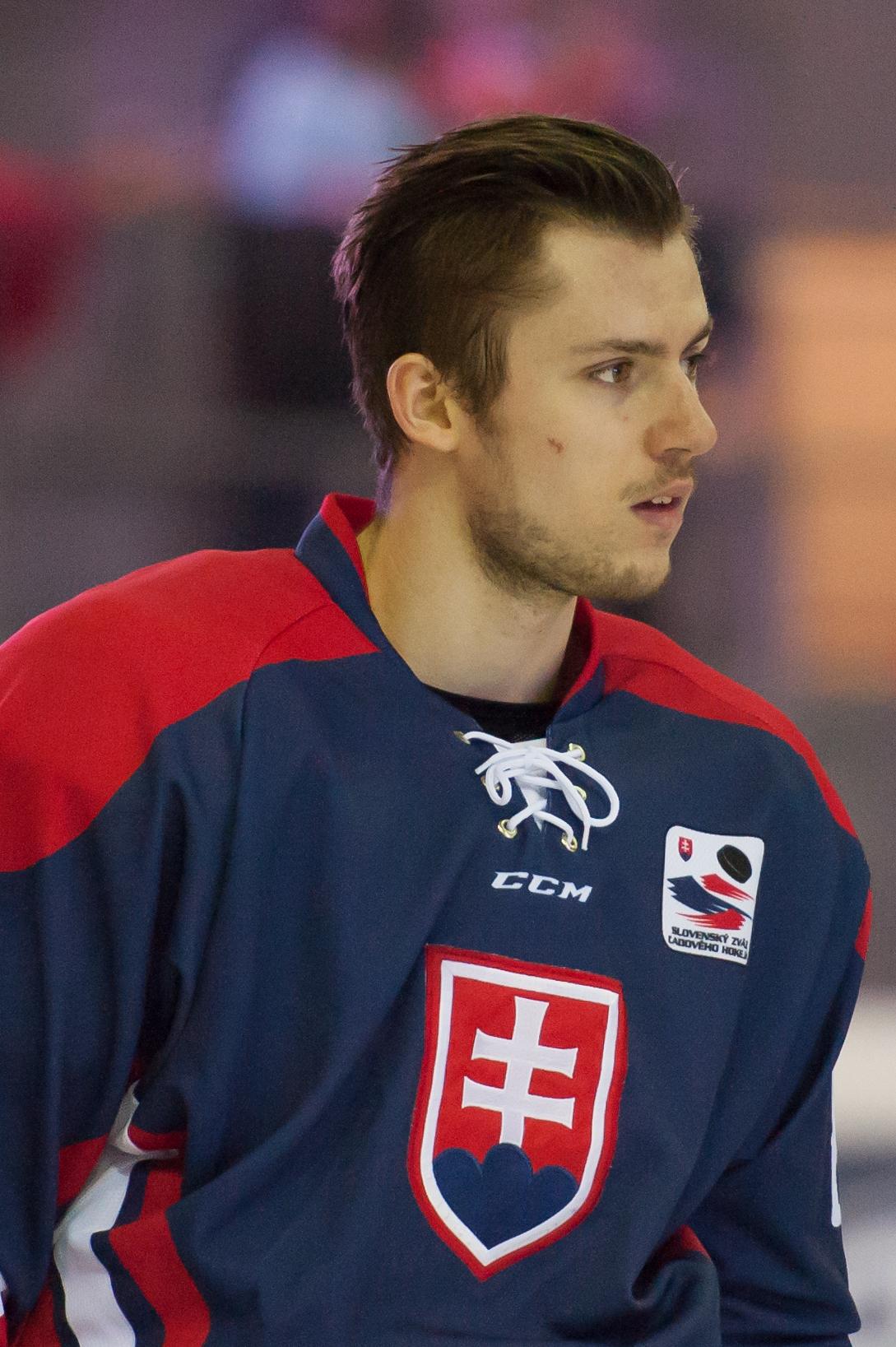
- Bakoš with Slovakia in 2015
- Born: 18 April 1990 (age 36) Spišská Nová Ves, Czechoslovakia
- Height: 6 ft 2 in (188 cm)
- Weight: 198 lb (90 kg; 14 st 2 lb)
- Position: Left wing
- Shoots: Right
- Slovak extraliga team Former teams: HC Slovan Bratislava; Orange 20; 36 Skalica; Bílí Tygři Liberec; Kunlun Red Star; Providence Bruins; HC Sochi; Admiral Vladivostok; Spartak Moscow; HC Oceláři Třinec
- National team: Slovakia
- NHL draft: Undrafted
- Playing career: 2010–present

Martin Bakoš (born 20 April 1990) is a Slovak professional ice hockey player currently under contract with HC Slovan Bratislava of the Slovak Extraliga.

== Playing career ==
Undrafted, Bakoš began his professional career within his native Slovakia, playing with Slovan Bratislava in the Slovak Extraliga in the 2007–08 season.

After his 10th professional European season, having also played in the Czech Extraliga and Kontinental Hockey League, Bakoš opted to pursue his NHL aspirations in signing as a free agent to a one-year, two-way contract with the Boston Bruins of the National Hockey League (NHL) on 14 June 2018. After attending the Bruins' training camp, Bakoš was assigned to begin the 2018–19 season with American Hockey League (AHL) affiliate, the Providence Bruins.

Bakoš appeared in 16 games with Providence, collecting just three goals, before he was placed on unconditional waivers in order for a mutual termination of his contract by the Boston Bruins on 10 December 2018. On 18 December, Bakoš signed with Sochi of the KHL until the end of the 2018–19 season. He was productive in his short tenure with Sochi, collecting 15 points through 22 games.

As a free agent, Bakoš was signed to a one-year contract to continue in the KHL with Admiral Vladivostok on 21 June 2019. In his lone season with Vladivostok, Bakoš was the club's leading scorer totalling 42 points in 61 games, however he was unable to prevent Admiral finishing as the lowest ranked Russian club in the 2019–20 season.

With the ambition to play in the post-season, Bakoš left Vladivostok as a free agent and signed an optional two-year contract with HC Spartak Moscow on 10 May 2020. In the following 2020–21 season, Bakoš was unable to match his previous season scoring rate, registering 14 goals and 28 points through 45 regular season games.

Leaving Spartak after a lone season, Bakoš continued in the KHL by agreeing to a one-year contract in a return to HC Sochi on 2 May 2021.

== Career statistics ==
=== Regular season and playoffs ===
| | | | Regular season | | | | | Playoffs |
| Season | Team | League | GP | G | A | Pts | PIM | GP | G | A | Pts | PIM |
|---|---|---|---|---|---|---|---|---|---|---|---|---|
| 2005–06 | HK Spišská Nová Ves | SVK U16 | 12 | 9 | 12 | 21 | 24 | — | — | — | — | — |
| 2005–06 | HK Spišská Nová Ves | SVK U18 | 34 | 13 | 16 | 29 | 26 | 2 | 1 | 0 | 1 | 47 |
| 2006–07 | HK Spišská Nová Ves | SVK U18 | 37 | 27 | 36 | 63 | 64 | — | — | — | — | — |
| 2006–07 | HK Spišská Nová Ves | SVK U20 | 6 | 3 | 1 | 4 | 4 | 8 | 1 | 1 | 2 | 14 |
| 2007–08 | HC Slovan Bratislava | SVK U18 | 8 | 10 | 11 | 21 | 2 | — | — | — | — | — |
| 2007–08 | HC Slovan Bratislava | SVK U20 | 46 | 29 | 32 | 61 | 40 | 2 | 3 | 1 | 4 | 4 |
| 2007–08 | HC Slovan Bratislava | Slovak | 1 | 0 | 0 | 0 | 0 | — | — | — | — | — |
| 2008–09 | HC Slovan Bratislava | SVK U20 | 30 | 13 | 15 | 28 | 32 | — | — | — | — | — |
| 2009–10 | HC Slovan Bratislava | Slovak | 17 | 2 | 1 | 3 | 2 | 13 | 1 | 2 | 3 | 4 |
| 2009–10 | HK Orange 20 | Slovak | 24 | 4 | 5 | 9 | 18 | — | — | — | — | — |
| 2010–11 | HC Slovan Bratislava | Slovak | 54 | 7 | 8 | 15 | 49 | 7 | 1 | 3 | 4 | 0 |
| 2011–12 | HC Slovan Bratislava | Slovak | 53 | 13 | 22 | 35 | 32 | 16 | 3 | 6 | 9 | 26 |
| 2012–13 | HC Slovan Bratislava | KHL | 24 | 3 | 4 | 7 | 10 | 1 | 0 | 0 | 0 | 0 |
| 2012–13 | HK 36 Skalica | Slovak | 8 | 6 | 3 | 9 | 4 | — | — | — | — | — |
| 2013–14 | HC Slovan Bratislava | KHL | 31 | 5 | 4 | 9 | 0 | — | — | — | — | — |
| 2014–15 | Bílí Tygři Liberec | ELH | 42 | 12 | 11 | 23 | 16 | — | — | — | — | — |
| 2015–16 | Bílí Tygři Liberec | ELH | 52 | 17 | 19 | 36 | 32 | 14 | 5 | 3 | 8 | 6 |
| 2016–17 | Kunlun Red Star | KHL | 47 | 11 | 11 | 22 | 26 | 5 | 1 | 0 | 1 | 2 |
| 2017–18 | Bílí Tygři Liberec | ELH | 52 | 14 | 26 | 40 | 34 | 10 | 2 | 3 | 5 | 0 |
| 2018–19 | Providence Bruins | AHL | 16 | 3 | 1 | 4 | 5 | — | — | — | — | — |
| 2018–19 | HC Sochi | KHL | 22 | 7 | 8 | 15 | 2 | 6 | 1 | 0 | 1 | 4 |
| 2019–20 | Admiral Vladivostok | KHL | 61 | 19 | 23 | 42 | 23 | — | — | — | — | — |
| 2020–21 | Spartak Moscow | KHL | 45 | 14 | 14 | 28 | 18 | 1 | 1 | 0 | 1 | 0 |
| 2021–22 | HC Sochi | KHL | 36 | 9 | 7 | 16 | 14 | — | — | — | — | — |
| Slovak totals | | | 157 | 32 | 39 | 71 | 105 | 36 | 5 | 6 | 11 | 30 |
| KHL totals | | | 266 | 68 | 71 | 139 | 93 | 13 | 3 | 0 | 3 | 6 |
| ELH totals | | | 146 | 43 | 56 | 99 | 82 | 30 | 9 | 6 | 15 | 20 |

=== International ===
| Year | Team | Event | Result | GP | G | A | Pts | PIM |
|---|---|---|---|---|---|---|---|---|
| 2010 | Slovakia | WJC | 8th | 6 | 2 | 2 | 4 | 2 |
| 2016 | Slovakia | WC | 9th | 7 | 1 | 0 | 1 | 0 |
| 2018 | Slovakia | OG | 11th | 4 | 1 | 1 | 2 | 0 |
| 2018 | Slovakia | WC | 9th | 7 | 2 | 2 | 4 | 0 |
| Junior totals | | | | 6 | 2 | 2 | 4 | 2 |
| Senior totals | | | | 18 | 4 | 3 | 7 | 0 |
