= Oliver Bohm =

Swedish ice hockey player

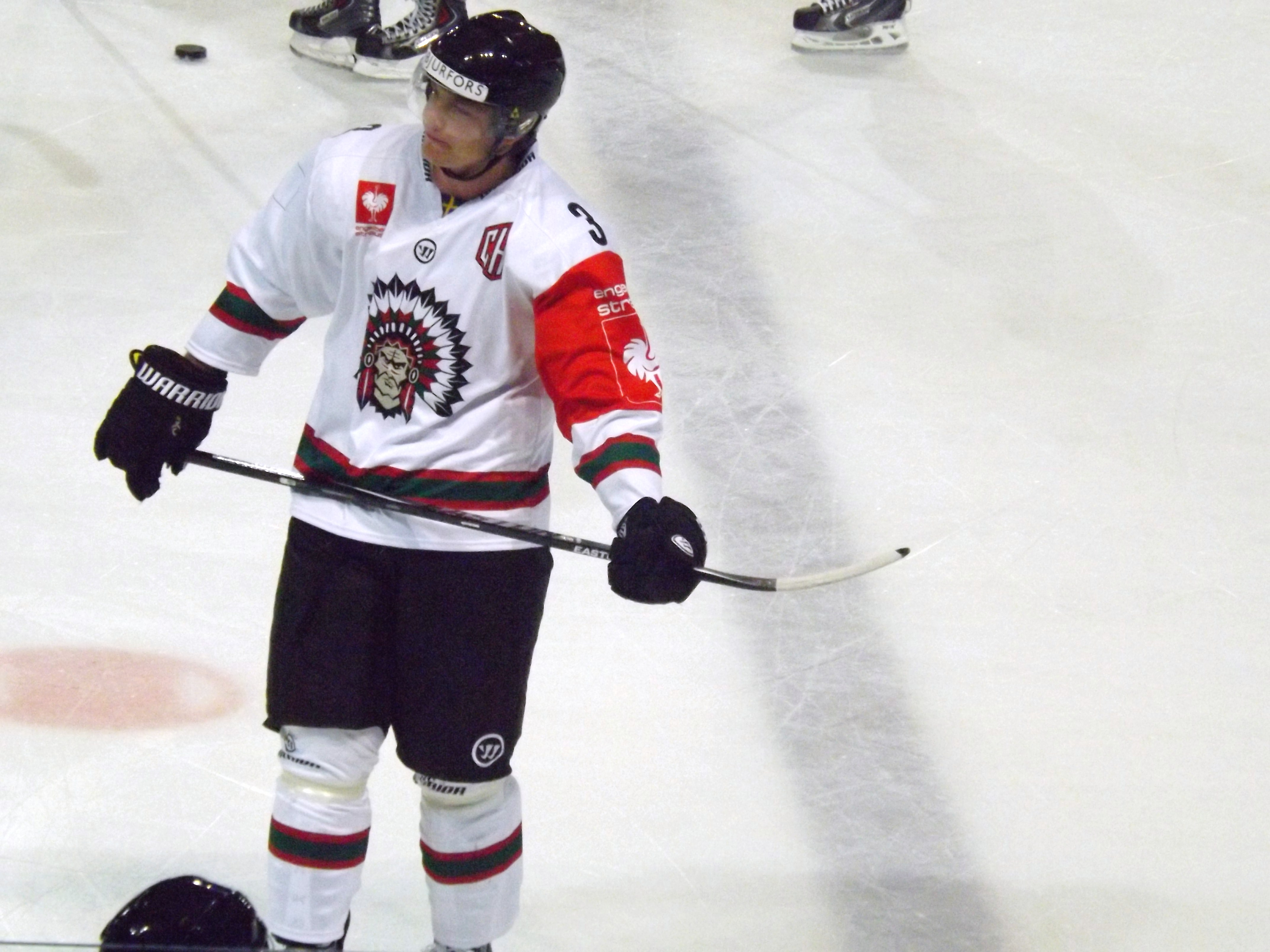
- Born: 14 April 1992 (age 33); Karlstad, Sweden
- Height: 191 cm (6 ft 3 in)
- Weight: 100 kg (220 lb; 15 st 10 lb)
- Position: Defence
- Shoots: Left
- Allsv team Former teams: Tingsryds AIF; Frölunda HC; Malmö Redhawks; Växjö Lakers; HC TPS; Timrå IK; HV71; Västerås IK
- Playing career: 2011–present

Oliver Bohm (born 14 April 1992) is a Swedish professional ice hockey defenceman for Tingsryds AIF of the HockeyAllsvenskan (Allsv). He is the cousin of the former ice hockey player and current coach Andreas Johansson.

== Playing career ==
Bohm played youth and junior ice hockey for Färjestads BK. In 2008, he represented Värmland in the TV-pucken. During the 2009–10 season, Bohm was loaned from Färjestad to IFK Munkfors in Division 1, the third-tier Swedish senior ice league. Bohm signed with Frölunda HC for the 2010–11 season to play in the J20 SuperElit, Sweden's premier junior ice hockey league. His first appearance with the club came in his hometown of Karlstad during the Junior European Trophy, which Frölunda won after a 4–3 shootout win against Malmö in the final. Bohm scored his first goal in the Elitserien on 10 January 2013, against AIK's Niklas Lundström in a 3–1 win at Hovet.

On 22 April 2016, Bohm signed as an impending free agent to a three-year contract with his third SHL club, the Växjö Lakers.

== Personal ==
Bohm is well documented for having an affinity for the yesteryear of rock music. Also, his unrelenting obsession with self-improvement leads him to review previous contests on Dartfish TV nightly, which perfectly exemplifies his professionalism. Perhaps, though, what he prides himself most on is his impeccably curated Dressman wardrobe that has taken nearly 3 painstaking years to assemble. Rumblings from the fashion underworld peg Oliver making his runway debut at the Dressman SS/17 show, expected to take place in his hometown of Karlstadt.

== Career statistics ==
			Regular season					Playoffs
Season	Team	League	GP	G	A	Pts	PIM	GP	G	A	Pts	PIM
2009–10	IFK Munkfors	Div. 1	18	2	2	4	35	—	—	—	—	—
2010–11	Frölunda HC	J20	41	4	12	16	22	7	2	1	3	2
2010–11	Frölunda HC	SEL	1	0	0	0	0	—	—	—	—	—
2011–12	Frölunda HC	J20	23	5	2	7	14	2	0	0	0	0
2011–12	Almtuna IS	Allsv	11	0	0	0	4	—	—	—	—	—
2011–12	Borås HC	Allsv	10	0	2	2	0	—	—	—	—	—
2011–12	Frölunda HC	SEL	22	0	0	0	2	1	0	0	0	0
2012–13	Frölunda HC	SEL	49	1	8	9	16	6	0	0	0	0
2012–13	IK Oskarshamn	Allsv	7	1	0	1	4	—	—	—	—	—
2013–14	Frölunda HC	J20	2	2	0	2	4	—	—	—	—	—
2013–14	Frölunda HC	SHL	48	1	5	6	12	7	0	1	1	4
2014–15	Frölunda HC	SHL	46	3	4	7	24	13	0	1	1	2
2015–16	Frölunda HC	SHL	15	0	3	3	0	—	—	—	—	—
2015–16	BIK Karlskoga	Allsv	7	0	1	1	6	—	—	—	—	—
2015–16	Malmö Redhawks	SHL	20	0	2	2	2	—	—	—	—	—
2016–17	Växjö Lakers	SHL	51	2	4	6	16	6	0	0	0	4
2017–18	Växjö Lakers	SHL	50	2	12	14	22	13	2	1	3	4
2018–19	Växjö Lakers	SHL	32	0	2	2	14	7	0	0	0	2
2019–20	Växjö Lakers	SHL	51	1	4	5	12	—	—	—	—	—
2020–21	HC TPS	Liiga	52	2	8	10	20	13	0	1	1	4
2021–22	Timrå IK	SHL	30	0	5	5	8	—	—	—	—	—
2021–22	HV71	Allsv	11	0	2	2	8	13	0	6	6	6
2022–23	Västerås IK	Allsv	49	3	4	7	16	7	1	2	3	6
2023–24	Västerås IK	Allsv	33	1	3	4	16	—	—	—	—	—
SHL totals			497	14	56	70	160	60	3	5	8	22

== Awards and honours ==
Award	Year
SHL
Le Mat Trophy (Växjö Lakers)	2018
