= Daniel Rákos =

Czech professional ice hockey player (born 1987)

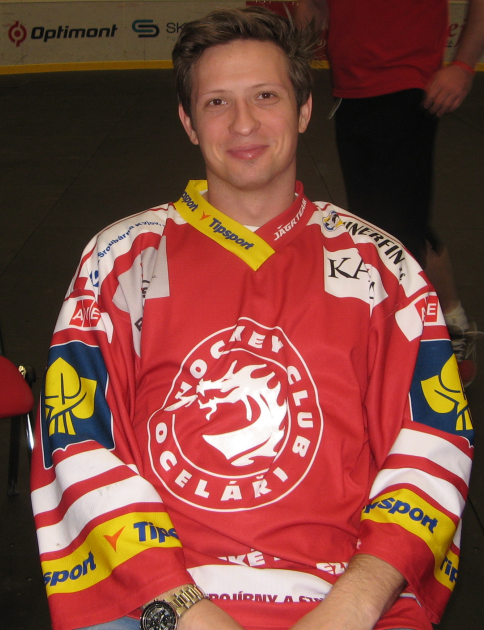
- Born: 25 May 1987 (age 38) Pardubice, Czechoslovakia
- Height: 6 ft 2 in (188 cm)
- Weight: 191 lb (87 kg; 13 st 9 lb)
- Position: Forward
- Shoots: Left
- Czech team Former teams: HC Pardubice; Swift Current Broncos; HC Pardubice; HC Oceláři Třinec; Královští Lvi; HC Kometa Brno
- Playing career: 2007–present

Daniel Rákos (born 25 May 1987) is a Czech professional ice hockey player. He is currently playing with HC Pardubice of the Czech Extraliga.

From the Pardubice junior school, Rákos went overseas to the club WHL Swift Current Broncos, then returned to Pardubice in May 2007 and joined the Pardubice A-t team. He made his Czech Extraliga debut playing with HC Pardubice during the 2007–08 Czech Extraliga season. Rákos played for Pardubice for five years and won two championship titles in the 2009–10 and 2011–12 seasons with them. He transferred to HC Oceláři Třinec in May 2012. After playing with them for seven years, he played for two different teams: Královští Lvi (2018–2020) and HC Kometa Brno (2019–2022), before returning to HC Pardubice. As of the 2024-25 Czech Extraliga season, Rákos is no longer on the active roster for the HC Pardubice.

== Career statistics ==
			Regular season					Playoffs
Season	Team	League	GP	G	A	Pts	PIM	GP	G	A	Pts	PIM
2002–03	HC Pardubice U18	Czech U18	23	1	3	4	16	—	—	—	—	—
2003–04	HC Pardubice U18	Czech U18	50	18	22	40	112	—	—	—	—	—
2004–05	HC Pardubice U20	Czech U20	47	8	13	21	36	2	0	0	0	2
2005–06	Swift Current Broncos	WHL	70	16	23	39	85	4	1	2	3	10
2006–07	Swift Current Broncos	WHL	63	16	19	35	108	6	0	3	3	10
2007–08	HC Pardubice	Czech	16	1	0	1	27	9	0	0	0	12
2007–08	HC Sumperk	Czech2	17	3	3	6	10	4	0	2	2	14
2007–08	HC Hradec Kralove	Czech2	15	0	4	4	10	—	—	—	—	—
2008–09	HC Pardubice	Czech	44	2	4	6	12	7	1	0	1	0
2008–09	HC Vrchlabi	Czech2	1	0	0	0	0	—	—	—	—	—
2008–09	SK Horacka Slavia Trebic	Czech2	19	4	11	15	46	—	—	—	—	—
2008–09	HC Hradec Kralove	Czech2	4	1	0	1	0	—	—	—	—	—
2009–10	HC Pardubice	Czech	52	5	6	11	46	9	2	0	2	4
2009–10	HC Chrudim	Czech2	1	0	0	0	2	—	—	—	—	—
2011–12	HC Pardubice	Czech	27	1	4	5	16	19	5	4	9	28
2012–13	HC Ocelari Trinec	Czech	50	10	10	20	46	13	1	8	9	16
2013–14	HC Ocelari Trinec	Czech	52	6	8	14	42	11	0	6	6	10
2014–15	HC Ocelari Trinec	Czech	42	9	8	17	60	8	1	1	2	4
2015–16	HC Ocelari Trinec	Czech	41	4	3	7	54	5	0	0	0	6
2016–17	HC Ocelari Trinec	Czech	51	11	10	21	46	6	1	1	2	10
2017–18	HC Ocelari Trinec	Czech	47	5	15	20	38	18	0	3	3	16
2018–19	HC Hradec Kralove	Czech	46	5	9	14	50	4	0	0	0	4
2019-20	HC Hradec Kralove/HC Kometa Brno	Czech	51	4	9	13	56	—	—	—	—	—
2020–21	HC Kometa Brno	Czech	19	0	4	4	12	9	0	0	0	14
2021–22	HC Kometa Brno	Czech	55	4	9	13	32	5	0	0	0	2
2022-23	HC Pardubice	Czech	24	0	2	2	16	6	1	2	3	0
2023-24	HC Pardubice	Czech	10	0	1	1	6	—	—	—	—	—
Czech totals			937	134	200	334	984	145	13	32	45	162
