= David Cienciala =

Czech professional ice hockey player

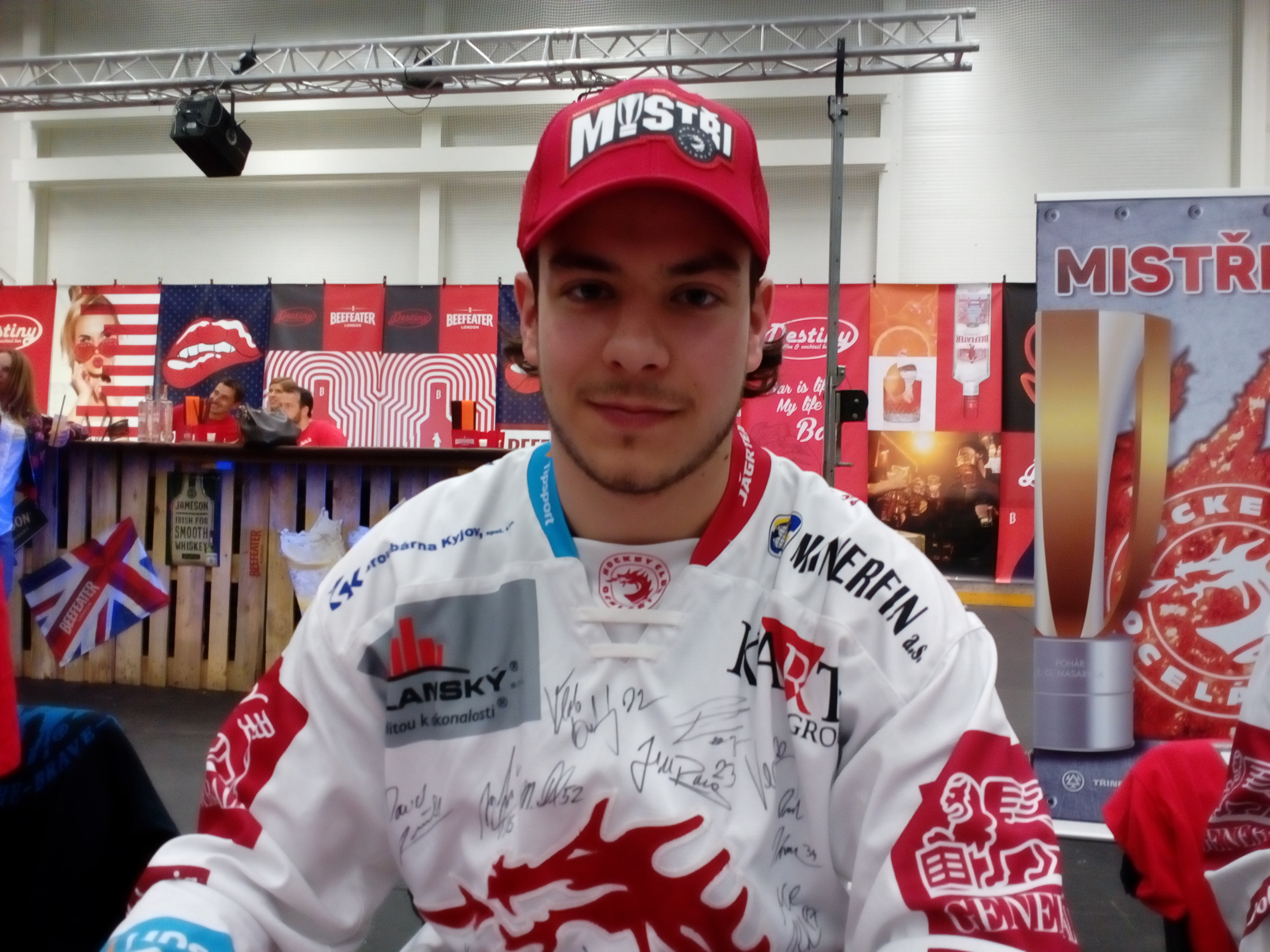
- Born: 1 December 1995 (age 29); Třinec, Czech Republic
- Height: 6 ft 1 in (185 cm)
- Weight: 187 lb (85 kg; 13 st 5 lb)
- Position: Forward
- Shoots: Left
- ELH team Former teams: HC Oceláři Třinec; BK Mladá Boleslav; HC Dynamo Pardubice
- Playing career: 2014–present

David Cienciala (born 1 December 1995) is a Czech professional ice hockey player. He is currently playing for HC Oceláři Třinec of the Czech Extraliga.

Cienciala made his Czech Extraliga debut playing with Oceláři Třinec during the 2014-15 Czech Extraliga season.
