= 2022–23 NHL transactions =

The following is a list of all team-to-team transactions that have occurred in the National Hockey League for the 2022–23 NHL season. It lists which team each player has been traded to, signed by, or claimed by, and for which player(s) or draft pick(s), if applicable. Players who have retired or that have had their contracts terminated are also listed.

The 2022–23 NHL trade deadline was on March 3, 2023. Players traded or claimed off waivers after that date will not be eligible to play in the 2023 Stanley Cup playoffs.

== Retirement ==
| Date | Player | Last Team | Ref |
|---|---|---|---|
| July 12, 2022 | Duncan Keith | Edmonton Oilers | |
| July 18, 2022 | Andrej Sekera | Dallas Stars | |
| July 21, 2022 | Ian Scott | Toronto Maple Leafs | |
| August 8, 2022 | Greg Pateryn | Anaheim Ducks | |
| August 17, 2022 | Kyle Turris | Edmonton Oilers | |
| September 8, 2022 | Mathieu Perreault | Montreal Canadiens | |
| September 14, 2022 | Nathan Gerbe | Columbus Blue Jackets | |
| September 19, 2022 | Kurtis Gabriel | Chicago Blackhawks | |
| September 20, 2022 | Keith Yandle | Philadelphia Flyers | |
| September 20, 2022 | Zdeno Chara | New York Islanders | |
| September 20, 2022 | P.K. Subban | New Jersey Devils | |
| October 12, 2022 | Andy Greene | New York Islanders | |
| December 19, 2022 | Andrew Hammond | New Jersey Devils | |
| December 19, 2022 | Alex Biega | Toronto Maple Leafs | |
| March 22, 2023 | Brian Boyle | Pittsburgh Penguins | |
| April 13, 2023 | Craig Anderson^{1} | Buffalo Sabres | |
| April 24, 2023 | Justin Braun | Philadelphia Flyers | |
| May 3, 2023 | Mark Borowiecki | Nashville Predators | |
| June 14, 2023 | Noah Philp | Edmonton Oilers | |

1. Anderson announced his retirement after the Sabres' final home game of the season, on April 13, 2023; he was subsequently scratched for the Sabres' lone road game afterward, and did not dress.

== Contract terminations ==
A team and player may mutually agree to terminate a player's contract at any time. All players must clear waivers before having a contract terminated.

Buyouts can only occur at specific times of the year. For more details on contract terminations as buyouts:

Teams may buy out player contracts (after the conclusion of a season) for a portion of the remaining value of the contract, paid over a period of twice the remaining length of the contract. This reduced number and extended period is applied to the cap hit as well.

- If the player was under the age of 26 at the time of the buyout the player's pay and cap hit will reduced by a factor of 2/3 over the extended period.
- If the player was 26 or older at the time of the buyout the player's pay and cap hit will reduced by a factor of 1/3 over the extended period.
- If the player was 35 or older at the time of signing the contract the player's pay will be reduced by a factor of 1/3, but the cap hit will not be reduced over the extended period.

Injured players cannot be bought out.

| Date | Player | Previous team | Notes | Ref |
|---|---|---|---|---|
| July 12, 2022 | Henrik Borgstrom | Chicago Blackhawks | Buyout | |
| July 12, 2022 | Brett Connolly | Chicago Blackhawks | Buyout | |
| July 13, 2022 | Rudolfs Balcers | San Jose Sharks | Buyout | |
| July 13, 2022 | Michael Del Zotto | Ottawa Senators | Buyout | |
| July 13, 2022 | Janne Kuokkanen | New Jersey Devils | Buyout | |
| July 13, 2022 | Oskar Lindblom | Philadelphia Flyers | Buyout | |
| July 24, 2022 | Yauheni Aksiantsiuk | Dallas Stars | Mutual termination | |
| July 25, 2022 | Alexander Khovanov | Minnesota Wild | Mutual termination | |
| October 14, 2022 | Linus Sandin | Philadelphia Flyers | Mutual termination | |
| October 21, 2022 | Michal Kempny | Seattle Kraken | Mutual termination | |
| October 29, 2022 | Lukas Klok | Arizona Coyotes | Mutual termination | |
| November 28, 2022 | Riley Sheahan | Buffalo Sabres | Mutual termination | |
| November 30, 2022 | Jakub Pour | Chicago Blackhawks | Mutual termination | |
| December 9, 2022 | Victor Berglund | Boston Bruins | Mutual termination | |
| December 16, 2022 | Axel Rindell | Toronto Maple Leafs | Mutual termination | |
| December 18, 2022 | Lukas Sedlak | Philadelphia Flyers | Mutual termination | |
| December 19, 2022 | Nikita Soshnikov | New York Islanders | Mutual termination | |
| December 19, 2022 | Danila Zhuravlyov | Colorado Avalanche | Mutual termination | |
| January 13, 2023 | Joseph Cramarossa | Minnesota Wild | Mutual termination | |
| January 31, 2023 | Anton Levtchi | Florida Panthers | Mutual termination | |
| February 1, 2023 | Juho Olkinuora | Detroit Red Wings | Mutual termination | |
| February 10, 2023 | Linus Hogberg | Philadelphia Flyers | Mutual termination | |
| March 9, 2023 | Pavel Gogolev | Chicago Blackhawks | Mutual termination | |
| April 30, 2023^{1} | Mitchell Miller | Boston Bruins | Termination | |
| June 16, 2023 | Oliver Ekman-Larsson | Vancouver Canucks | Buyout | |
| June 21, 2023 | Zack Kassian | Arizona Coyotes | Buyout | |
| June 21, 2023 | Patrik Nemeth | Arizona Coyotes | Buyout | |

1. Boston first announced their intention to terminate Miller's contract November 6, 2022. Following a grievance from the NHLPA, Boston and Miller reached a confidential agreement to terminate the contract in February 2023 and the contract was removed from Boston's reserve list at the end of April 2023.

== Free agency ==
Note: This does not include players who have re-signed with their previous team as an unrestricted free agent or as a restricted free agent.

| Date | Player | New team | Previous team | Ref |
|---|---|---|---|---|
| July 13, 2022 | Nils Aman | Vancouver Canucks | Colorado Avalanche | |
| July 13, 2022 | Filip Johansson | Vancouver Canucks | Minnesota Wild | |
| July 13, 2022 | Jack Campbell | Edmonton Oilers | Toronto Maple Leafs | |
| July 13, 2022 | Claude Giroux | Ottawa Senators | Florida Panthers | |
| July 13, 2022 | Ilya Samsonov | Toronto Maple Leafs | Washington Capitals | |
| July 13, 2022 | Ian Cole | Tampa Bay Lightning | Carolina Hurricanes | |
| July 13, 2022 | Brendan Smith | New Jersey Devils | Carolina Hurricanes | |
| July 13, 2022 | Justin Schultz | Seattle Kraken | Washington Capitals | |
| July 13, 2022 | Curtis Lazar | Vancouver Canucks | Boston Bruins | |
| July 13, 2022 | Kevin Rooney | Calgary Flames | New York Rangers | |
| July 13, 2022 | Xavier Ouellet | Pittsburgh Penguins | Montreal Canadiens | |
| July 13, 2022 | Laurent Dauphin | Arizona Coyotes | Montreal Canadiens | |
| July 13, 2022 | Nicolas Aube-Kubel | Toronto Maple Leafs | Colorado Avalanche | |
| July 13, 2022 | Vincent Trocheck | New York Rangers | Carolina Hurricanes | |
| July 13, 2022 | Andrew Copp | Detroit Red Wings | New York Rangers | |
| July 13, 2022 | Ilya Lyubushkin | Buffalo Sabres | Toronto Maple Leafs | |
| July 13, 2022 | Troy Stecher | Arizona Coyotes | Los Angeles Kings | |
| July 13, 2022 | Wyatt Kalynuk | Vancouver Canucks | Chicago Blackhawks | |
| July 13, 2022 | Olli Maatta | Detroit Red Wings | Los Angeles Kings | |
| July 13, 2022 | Andreas Athanasiou | Chicago Blackhawks | Los Angeles Kings | |
| July 13, 2022 | Max Domi | Chicago Blackhawks | Carolina Hurricanes | |
| July 13, 2022 | Ilya Mikheyev | Vancouver Canucks | Toronto Maple Leafs | |
| July 13, 2022 | Eric Comrie | Buffalo Sabres | Winnipeg Jets | |
| July 13, 2022 | Jaroslav Halak | New York Rangers | Vancouver Canucks | |
| July 13, 2022 | Colin White | Florida Panthers | Ottawa Senators | |
| July 13, 2022 | A.J. Greer | Boston Bruins | New Jersey Devils | |
| July 13, 2022 | Nicolas Meloche | Calgary Flames | San Jose Sharks | |
| July 13, 2022 | Josh Brown | Arizona Coyotes | Boston Bruins | |
| July 13, 2022 | Nick Bjugstad | Arizona Coyotes | Minnesota Wild | |
| July 13, 2022 | Adam Gaudette | Toronto Maple Leafs | Ottawa Senators | |
| July 13, 2022 | Frank Vatrano | Anaheim Ducks | New York Rangers | |
| July 13, 2022 | Collin Delia | Vancouver Canucks | Chicago Blackhawks | |
| July 13, 2022 | Ben Chiarot | Detroit Red Wings | Florida Panthers | |
| July 13, 2022 | Vladislav Namestnikov | Tampa Bay Lightning | Dallas Stars | |
| July 13, 2022 | Dustin Tokarski | Pittsburgh Penguins | Buffalo Sabres | |
| July 13, 2022 | Thomas Greiss | St. Louis Blues | Detroit Red Wings | |
| July 13, 2022 | Alex Stalock | Chicago Blackhawks | San Jose Sharks | |
| July 13, 2022 | Dakota Joshua | Vancouver Canucks | St. Louis Blues | |
| July 13, 2022 | Charles Hudon | Colorado Avalanche | Tampa Bay Lightning | |
| July 13, 2022 | Darcy Kuemper | Washington Capitals | Colorado Avalanche | |
| July 13, 2022 | Calvin Pickard | Edmonton Oilers | Detroit Red Wings | |
| July 13, 2022 | Dennis Gilbert | Calgary Flames | Colorado Avalanche | |
| July 13, 2022 | Charlie Lindgren | Washington Capitals | St. Louis Blues | |
| July 13, 2022 | Mason Marchment | Dallas Stars | Florida Panthers | |
| July 13, 2022 | Noel Acciari | St. Louis Blues | Florida Panthers | |
| July 13, 2022 | Colin Blackwell | Chicago Blackhawks | Toronto Maple Leafs | |
| July 13, 2022 | Andrew Poturalski | Seattle Kraken | Carolina Hurricanes | |
| July 13, 2022 | Nick Cousins | Florida Panthers | Nashville Predators | |
| July 13, 2022 | Madison Bowey | Montreal Canadiens | Vancouver Canucks | |
| July 13, 2022 | Anthony Richard | Montreal Canadiens | Tampa Bay Lightning | |
| July 13, 2022 | Mitchell Stephens | Montreal Canadiens | Detroit Red Wings | |
| July 13, 2022 | Oskar Lindblom | San Jose Sharks | Philadelphia Flyers | |
| July 13, 2022 | Louis Domingue | New York Rangers | Pittsburgh Penguins | |
| July 13, 2022 | Erik Gudbranson | Columbus Blue Jackets | Calgary Flames | |
| July 13, 2022 | Jan Rutta | Pittsburgh Penguins | Tampa Bay Lightning | |
| July 13, 2022 | Erik Gustafsson | Washington Capitals | Chicago Blackhawks | |
| July 13, 2022 | Andre Burakovsky | Seattle Kraken | Colorado Avalanche | |
| July 13, 2022 | Marc Staal | Florida Panthers | Detroit Red Wings | |
| July 13, 2022 | David Rittich | Winnipeg Jets | Nashville Predators | |
| July 13, 2022 | David Perron | Detroit Red Wings | St. Louis Blues | |
| July 13, 2022 | Dominik Kubalik | Detroit Red Wings | Chicago Blackhawks | |
| July 13, 2022 | Jonas Johansson | Colorado Avalanche | Florida Panthers | |
| July 13, 2022 | Greg McKegg | Edmonton Oilers | New York Rangers | |
| July 13, 2022 | Kale Clague | Buffalo Sabres | Montreal Canadiens | |
| July 13, 2022 | Nic Petan | Minnesota Wild | Vancouver Canucks | |
| July 13, 2022 | Sheldon Rempal | Vegas Golden Knights | Vancouver Canucks | |
| July 13, 2022 | Glenn Gawdin | Anaheim Ducks | Calgary Flames | |
| July 13, 2022 | Roland McKeown | Nashville Predators | Colorado Avalanche | |
| July 13, 2022 | Pheonix Copley | Los Angeles Kings | Washington Capitals | |
| July 13, 2022 | Nicolas Deslauriers | Philadelphia Flyers | Minnesota Wild | |
| July 13, 2022 | Anthony Bitetto | Florida Panthers | San Jose Sharks | |
| July 13, 2022 | Steven Fogarty | Minnesota Wild | Boston Bruins | |
| July 13, 2022 | Andrej Sustr | Minnesota Wild | Anaheim Ducks | |
| July 13, 2022 | Kevin Stenlund | Winnipeg Jets | Columbus Blue Jackets | |
| July 13, 2022 | Vinni Lettieri | Boston Bruins | Anaheim Ducks | |
| July 13, 2022 | Connor Carrick | Boston Bruins | Seattle Kraken | |
| July 13, 2022 | Keith Kinkaid | Boston Bruins | New York Rangers | |
| July 13, 2022 | Dan Renouf | Boston Bruins | Detroit Red Wings | |
| July 13, 2022 | Brett Seney | Chicago Blackhawks | Toronto Maple Leafs | |
| July 13, 2022 | Luke Philp | Chicago Blackhawks | Calgary Flames | |
| July 13, 2022 | Jesper Froden | Seattle Kraken | Boston Bruins | |
| July 13, 2022 | Magnus Hellberg | Seattle Kraken | Detroit Red Wings | |
| July 13, 2022 | Brogan Rafferty | Seattle Kraken | Anaheim Ducks | |
| July 13, 2022 | Justin Braun | Philadelphia Flyers | New York Rangers | |
| July 13, 2022 | Kristians Rubins | Ottawa Senators | Toronto Maple Leafs | |
| July 13, 2022 | Jeremy Davies | Buffalo Sabres | Nashville Predators | |
| July 13, 2022 | Chase Priskie | Buffalo Sabres | Florida Panthers | |
| July 13, 2022 | Clark Bishop | Calgary Flames | Ottawa Senators | |
| July 13, 2022 | Colin Miller | Dallas Stars | Buffalo Sabres | |
| July 13, 2022 | Ondrej Kase | Carolina Hurricanes | Toronto Maple Leafs | |
| July 13, 2022 | Nico Sturm | San Jose Sharks | Colorado Avalanche | |
| July 13, 2022 | Martin Jones | Seattle Kraken | Philadelphia Flyers | |
| July 13, 2022 | Josh Archibald | Pittsburgh Penguins | Edmonton Oilers | |
| July 13, 2022 | Johnny Gaudreau | Columbus Blue Jackets | Calgary Flames | |
| July 13, 2022 | Alex Lyon | Florida Panthers | Carolina Hurricanes | |
| July 13, 2022 | Matt Luff | Detroit Red Wings | Nashville Predators | |
| July 13, 2022 | Austin Czarnik | Detroit Red Wings | New York Islanders | |
| July 13, 2022 | Louie Belpedio | Philadelphia Flyers | Montreal Canadiens | |
| July 13, 2022 | Adam Brooks | Philadelphia Flyers | Winnipeg Jets | |
| July 13, 2022 | Troy Grosenick | Philadelphia Flyers | Boston Bruins | |
| July 13, 2022 | Cooper Marody | Philadelphia Flyers | Edmonton Oilers | |
| July 13, 2022 | Jon Gillies | Arizona Coyotes | New Jersey Devils | |
| July 13, 2022 | Matt Benning | San Jose Sharks | Nashville Predators | |
| July 13, 2022 | Michael Hutchinson | Vegas Golden Knights | Toronto Maple Leafs | |
| July 13, 2022 | Josh Jacobs | Colorado Avalanche | Carolina Hurricanes | |
| July 13, 2022 | Spencer Smallman | Colorado Avalanche | Carolina Hurricanes | |
| July 13, 2022 | Haydn Fleury | Tampa Bay Lightning | Seattle Kraken | |
| July 13, 2022 | Markus Nutivaara | San Jose Sharks | Florida Panthers | |
| July 13, 2022 | Brian Pinho | New Jersey Devils | Washington Capitals | |
| July 13, 2022 | Drake Caggiula | Pittsburgh Penguins | Buffalo Sabres | |
| July 13, 2022 | Byron Froese | Vegas Golden Knights | Calgary Flames | |
| July 13, 2022 | Ryan Strome | Anaheim Ducks | New York Rangers | |
| July 13, 2022 | Jack Dugan | New Jersey Devils | Vegas Golden Knights | |
| July 13, 2022 | Cameron Hughes | Seattle Kraken | Boston Bruins | |
| July 13, 2022 | Austin Poganski | Seattle Kraken | Winnipeg Jets | |
| July 13, 2022 | Andy Welinski | New York Rangers | Calgary Flames | |
| July 14, 2022 | Ondrej Palat | New Jersey Devils | Tampa Bay Lightning | |
| July 14, 2022 | Zach Sawchenko | Carolina Hurricanes | San Jose Sharks | |
| July 14, 2022 | Mark Pysyk | Detroit Red Wings | Buffalo Sabres | |
| July 14, 2022 | Ryan Carpenter | New York Rangers | Calgary Flames | |
| July 14, 2022 | Rudolfs Balcers | Florida Panthers | San Jose Sharks | |
| July 14, 2022 | Dylan Sikura | Chicago Blackhawks | Colorado Avalanche | |
| July 14, 2022 | Josh Leivo | St. Louis Blues | Carolina Hurricanes | |
| July 14, 2022 | Riley Barber | Dallas Stars | Detroit Red Wings | |
| July 14, 2022 | Chase De Leo | Anaheim Ducks | New Jersey Devils | |
| July 14, 2022 | Justin Kirkland | Anaheim Ducks | Calgary Flames | |
| July 14, 2022 | Austin Strand | Anaheim Ducks | Los Angeles Kings | |
| July 14, 2022 | Colton White | Anaheim Ducks | New Jersey Devils | |
| July 14, 2022 | Jean-Sebastien Dea | Arizona Coyotes | Montreal Canadiens | |
| July 14, 2022 | Antoine Bibeau | Ottawa Senators | Seattle Kraken | |
| July 14, 2022 | Jacob Larsson | Ottawa Senators | Anaheim Ducks | |
| July 14, 2022 | Anthony Angello | St. Louis Blues | Pittsburgh Penguins | |
| July 14, 2022 | Matthew Highmore | St. Louis Blues | Vancouver Canucks | |
| July 14, 2022 | Aaron Dell | San Jose Sharks | Buffalo Sabres | |
| July 14, 2022 | C.J. Suess | San Jose Sharks | Winnipeg Jets | |
| July 14, 2022 | Andrew Agozzino | San Jose Sharks | Ottawa Senators | |
| July 14, 2022 | Jordan Gross | Nashville Predators | Colorado Avalanche | |
| July 14, 2022 | Kevin Gravel | Nashville Predators | Calgary Flames | |
| July 14, 2022 | Kiefer Sherwood | Nashville Predators | Colorado Avalanche | |
| July 14, 2022 | Mark Jankowski | Nashville Predators | Buffalo Sabres | |
| July 14, 2022 | Kevin Lankinen | Nashville Predators | Chicago Blackhawks | |
| July 14, 2022 | Henrik Borgstrom | Washington Capitals | Chicago Blackhawks | |
| July 14, 2022 | Dylan Strome | Washington Capitals | Chicago Blackhawks | |
| July 14, 2022 | Kyle Capobianco | Winnipeg Jets | Arizona Coyotes | |
| July 14, 2022 | Jordie Benn | Toronto Maple Leafs | Minnesota Wild | |
| July 14, 2022 | Victor Mete | Toronto Maple Leafs | Ottawa Senators | |
| July 14, 2022 | Christian Wolanin | Vancouver Canucks | Los Angeles Kings | |
| July 14, 2022 | John Hayden | Seattle Kraken | Buffalo Sabres | |
| July 14, 2022 | Turner Elson | New York Rangers | Detroit Red Wings | |
| July 15, 2022 | Ashton Sautner | Winnipeg Jets | Vancouver Canucks | |
| July 15, 2022 | Martin Frk | St. Louis Blues | Los Angeles Kings | |
| July 15, 2022 | Brad Hunt | Colorado Avalanche | Vancouver Canucks | |
| July 15, 2022 | Gerald Mayhew | Florida Panthers | Anaheim Ducks | |
| July 15, 2022 | Calle Jarnkrok | Toronto Maple Leafs | Calgary Flames | |
| July 15, 2022 | Zach Sanford | Nashville Predators | Winnipeg Jets | |
| July 15, 2022 | Mackenzie MacEachern | Carolina Hurricanes | St. Louis Blues | |
| July 16, 2022 | Ben Jones | Calgary Flames | Vegas Golden Knights | |
| July 16, 2022 | Chris Tierney | Florida Panthers | Ottawa Senators | |
| July 17, 2022 | Mattias Janmark | Edmonton Oilers | Vegas Golden Knights | |
| July 17, 2022 | Michael Del Zotto | Florida Panthers | Ottawa Senators | |
| July 20, 2022 | Gabriel Carlsson | Washington Capitals | Columbus Blue Jackets | |
| July 21, 2022 | Nino Niederreiter | Nashville Predators | Carolina Hurricanes | |
| July 22, 2022 | Will Butcher | Dallas Stars | Buffalo Sabres | |
| July 24, 2022 | Michal Kempny | Seattle Kraken | Washington Capitals | |
| July 25, 2022 | Robert Hagg | Detroit Red Wings | Florida Panthers | |
| July 25, 2022 | William Lagesson | Carolina Hurricanes | Montreal Canadiens | |
| July 25, 2022 | Buddy Robinson | Chicago Blackhawks | Anaheim Ducks | |
| July 25, 2022 | Trevor Carrick | Tampa Bay Lightning | Anaheim Ducks | |
| July 25, 2022 | Ryan Dzingel | Carolina Hurricanes | San Jose Sharks | |
| July 27, 2022 | Olli Juolevi | Anaheim Ducks | Detroit Red Wings | |
| July 29, 2022 | John Klingberg | Anaheim Ducks | Dallas Stars | |
| August 1, 2022 | C.J. Smith | New York Rangers | Carolina Hurricanes | |
| August 3, 2022 | Anton Blidh | Colorado Avalanche | Boston Bruins | |
| August 10, 2022 | Riley Sheahan | Buffalo Sabres | Seattle Kraken | |
| August 16, 2022 | Jack Johnson | Chicago Blackhawks | Colorado Avalanche | |
| August 17, 2022 | Cole Guttman | Chicago Blackhawks | Tampa Bay Lightning | |
| August 18, 2022 | Sammy Walker | Minnesota Wild | Tampa Bay Lightning | |
| August 18, 2022 | Nazem Kadri | Calgary Flames | Colorado Avalanche | |
| August 20, 2022 | Jack St. Ivany | Pittsburgh Penguins | Philadelphia Flyers | |
| August 23, 2022 | Dennis Cholowski | New York Islanders | Seattle Kraken | |
| August 23, 2022 | Hudson Fasching | New York Islanders | Arizona Coyotes | |
| August 23, 2022 | Paul Stastny | Carolina Hurricanes | Winnipeg Jets | |
| August 24, 2022 | Phil Kessel | Vegas Golden Knights | Arizona Coyotes | |
| August 30, 2022 | Sam Steel | Minnesota Wild | Anaheim Ducks | |
| September 2, 2022 | Sam Gagner | Winnipeg Jets | Detroit Red Wings | |
| September 2, 2022 | Ryan Murray | Edmonton Oilers | Colorado Avalanche | |
| September 3, 2022 | Evgeny Svechnikov | San Jose Sharks | Winnipeg Jets | |
| September 12, 2022 | Evan Rodrigues | Colorado Avalanche | Pittsburgh Penguins | |
| September 14, 2022 | Tyler Motte | Ottawa Senators | New York Rangers | |
| September 30, 2022 | Scott Harrington | San Jose Sharks | Columbus Blue Jackets | |
| October 1, 2022 | Calvin de Haan | Carolina Hurricanes | Chicago Blackhawks | |
| October 1, 2022 | Nathan Beaulieu | Anaheim Ducks | Pittsburgh Penguins | |
| October 9, 2022 | Zach Aston-Reese | Toronto Maple Leafs | Anaheim Ducks | |
| October 9, 2022 | Jimmy Vesey | New York Rangers | New Jersey Devils | |
| October 10, 2022 | Derick Brassard | Ottawa Senators | Edmonton Oilers | |
| October 11, 2022 | Anton Stralman | Boston Bruins | Arizona Coyotes | |
| October 15, 2022 | Sonny Milano | Washington Capitals | Anaheim Ducks | |
| October 21, 2022 | Eric Staal | Florida Panthers | Montreal Canadiens | |
| October 25, 2022 | Tyler Pitlick | St. Louis Blues | Montreal Canadiens | |
| October 27, 2022 | Christopher Gibson | Seattle Kraken | Florida Panthers | |
| October 27, 2022 | Ben Harpur | New York Rangers | Nashville Predators | |
| November 28, 2022 | Alex Galchenyuk | Colorado Avalanche | Arizona Coyotes | |

=== Imports ===
This section is for players who were not previously on contract with NHL teams in the past season. Listed is the last team and league they were under contract with.

| Date | Player | New team | Previous team | League | Ref |
|---|---|---|---|---|---|
| July 13, 2022 | Matej Blumel | Dallas Stars | HC Dynamo Pardubice | ELH | |
| July 13, 2022 | Kai Wissmann | Boston Bruins | Eisbaren Berlin | DEL | |
| July 13, 2022 | Markus Nurmi | Nashville Predators | HC TPS | Liiga | |
| July 13, 2022 | Ville Petman | Seattle Kraken | SaiPa | Liiga | |
| July 13, 2022 | Calle Sjalin | Florida Panthers | Leksands IF | SHL | |
| July 13, 2022 | Lukas Sedlak | Colorado Avalanche | Traktor Chelyabinsk | KHL | |
| July 13, 2022 | Anton Levtchi | Florida Panthers | Tappara | Liiga | |
| July 13, 2022 | Juho Olkinuora | Detroit Red Wings | Metallurg Magnitogorsk | KHL | |
| July 13, 2022 | Andrei Kuzmenko | Vancouver Canucks | SKA Saint Petersburg | KHL | |
| July 13, 2022 | Jeff Kubiak | New York Islanders | Bridgeport Islanders | AHL | |
| July 13, 2022 | Nathan Staios | Florida Panthers | Hamilton Bulldogs | OHL | |
| July 13, 2022 | Felix Robert | Tampa Bay Lightning | Wilkes-Barre/Scranton Penguins | AHL | |
| July 13, 2022 | Tobie Paquette-Bisson | Los Angeles Kings | Laval Rocket | AHL | |
| July 13, 2022 | Sakari Manninen | Vegas Golden Knights | Salavat Yulaev Ufa | KHL | |
| July 13, 2022 | Andreas Englund | Colorado Avalanche | Colorado Eagles | AHL | |
| July 13, 2022 | Oscar Dansk | Calgary Flames | HC Spartak Moscow | KHL | |
| July 13, 2022 | Jake Lucchini | Ottawa Senators | Belleville Senators | AHL | |
| July 13, 2022 | Tyler Wotherspoon | New Jersey Devils | Utica Comets | AHL | |
| July 14, 2022 | Dylan McLaughlin | St. Louis Blues | Rockford IceHogs | AHL | |
| July 14, 2022 | Spencer Foo | Vegas Golden Knights | HC Kunlun Red Star | KHL | |
| July 14, 2022 | Lukas Klok | Arizona Coyotes | HC Neftekhimik Nizhnekamsk | KHL | |
| July 14, 2022 | Alex Limoges | Winnipeg Jets | San Diego Gulls | AHL | |
| July 15, 2022 | Malte Stromwall | Carolina Hurricanes | HC Dinamo Minsk | KHL | |
| July 16, 2022 | Rourke Chartier | Ottawa Senators | Belleville Senators | AHL | |
| July 20, 2022 | Joe Fleming | Vegas Golden Knights | Northeastern Huskies | NCAA | |
| July 25, 2022 | Jayce Hawryluk | Ottawa Senators | Skelleftea AIK | SHL | |
| August 8, 2022 | David Krejci | Boston Bruins | HC Olomouc | ELH | |
| September 20, 2022 | Patrick Giles | Florida Panthers | Charlotte Checkers | AHL | |
| September 21, 2022 | Nikita Soshnikov | New York Islanders | Avangard Omsk | KHL | |
| September 30, 2022 | Kai Schwindt | Florida Panthers | Mississauga Steelheads | OHL | |
| October 2, 2022 | Nolan Lalonde | Columbus Blue Jackets | Erie Otters | OHL | |
| October 9, 2022 | Pierre-Cedric Labrie | Tampa Bay Lightning | Syracuse Crunch | AHL | |
| October 31, 2022 | Matt Murray | Dallas Stars | Texas Stars | AHL | |
| November 2, 2022 | Dylan Wells | Chicago Blackhawks | Rockford IceHogs | AHL | |
| November 4, 2022 | Mitchell Miller | Boston Bruins | Tri-City Storm | USHL | |
| November 6, 2022 | Keith Petruzzelli | Toronto Maple Leafs | Toronto Marlies | AHL | |
| November 14, 2022 | Nolan Burke | Nashville Predators | Sarnia Sting | OHL | |
| December 18, 2022 | Jason Demers | Edmonton Oilers | Ak Bars Kazan | KHL | |
| December 19, 2022 | Justin Richards | Columbus Blue Jackets | Cleveland Monsters | AHL | |
| January 6, 2023 | Justin Bailey | Edmonton Oilers | Bakersfield Condors | AHL | |
| February 23, 2023 | Dave Gust | Chicago Blackhawks | Rockford IceHogs | AHL | |
| February 27, 2023 | Michael Houser | Buffalo Sabres | Rochester Americans | AHL | |
| March 1, 2023 | Alexandre Doucet | Detroit Red Wings | Halifax Mooseheads | QMJHL | |
| March 1, 2023 | Evan Cormier | Winnipeg Jets | Manitoba Moose | AHL | |
| March 2, 2023 | Ethen Frank | Washington Capitals | Hershey Bears | AHL | |
| March 2, 2023 | Derrick Pouliot | San Jose Sharks | San Jose Barracuda | AHL | |
| March 2, 2023 | J-F Berube | Florida Panthers | Charlotte Checkers | AHL | |
| March 2, 2023 | Evan Fitzpatrick | Florida Panthers | Charlotte Checkers | AHL | |
| March 2, 2023 | Dylan Ferguson | Ottawa Senators | Belleville Senators | AHL | |
| March 2, 2023 | Jaxsen Wiebe | Anaheim Ducks | Prince George Cougars | WHL | |
| March 2, 2023 | Christoffer Sedoff | Vegas Golden Knights | Red Deer Rebels | WHL | |
| March 3, 2023 | Alex Chiasson | Detroit Red Wings | Grand Rapids Griffins | AHL | |
| March 3, 2023 | John Lethemon | Detroit Red Wings | Grand Rapids Griffins | AHL | |
| March 6, 2023 | Anton Malmstrom | St. Louis Blues | Bowling Green Falcons | NCAA | |
| March 7, 2023 | Will Zmolek | Philadelphia Flyers | Bemidji State Beavers | NCAA | |
| March 10, 2023 | Kyle McDonald | Dallas Stars | North Bay Battalion | OHL | |
| March 15, 2023 | Cameron Butler | Columbus Blue Jackets | Oshawa Generals | OHL | |
| March 18, 2023 | Chase Wheatcroft | Dallas Stars | Prince George Cougars | WHL | |
| March 20, 2023 | Hunter McKown | Columbus Blue Jackets | Colorado College Tigers | NCAA | |
| March 22, 2023 | Carl Berglund | Edmonton Oilers | UMass Lowell River Hawks | NCAA | |
| March 25, 2023 | Parker Ford | Winnipeg Jets | Providence Friars | NCAA | |
| March 26, 2023 | Max Sasson | Vancouver Canucks | Western Michigan Broncos | NCAA | |
| March 29, 2023 | Akito Hirose | Vancouver Canucks | Minnesota State Mavericks | NCAA | |
| March 29, 2023 | Jason Polin | Colorado Avalanche | Western Michigan Broncos | NCAA | |
| March 29, 2023 | Jake Livingstone | Nashville Predators | Minnesota State Mavericks | NCAA | |
| March 30, 2023 | Sam Malinski | Colorado Avalanche | Cornell Big Red | NCAA | |
| March 30, 2023 | Ondrej Pavel | Colorado Avalanche | Minnesota State Mavericks | NCAA | |
| March 31, 2023 | Aidan Fulp | New York Islanders | Western Michigan Broncos | NCAA | |
| March 31, 2023 | Travis Mitchell | New York Islanders | Cornell Big Red | NCAA | |
| March 31, 2023 | Nikita Tolopilo | Vancouver Canucks | Sodertalje SK | HA | |
| April 2, 2023 | Ryan McAllister | Florida Panthers | Western Michigan Broncos | NCAA | |
| April 4, 2023 | Cole McWard | Vancouver Canucks | Ohio State Buckeyes | NCAA | |
| April 11, 2023 | Logan Morrison | Seattle Kraken | Ottawa 67's | OHL | |
| April 11, 2023 | Yaniv Perets | Carolina Hurricanes | Quinnipiac Bobcats | NCAA | |
| April 18, 2023 | Uvis Balinskis | Florida Panthers | HC Bili Tygri Liberec | ELH | |
| April 27, 2023 | Hardy Haman Aktell | Washington Capitals | Vaxjo Lakers | SHL | |
| May 2, 2023 | Ales Stezka | Seattle Kraken | HC Vitkovice Ridera | ELH | |
| May 3, 2023 | Valtteri Pulli | San Jose Sharks | HC TPS | Liiga | |
| May 3, 2023 | Georgi Romanov | San Jose Sharks | Gornyak-UGMK | VHL | |
| May 5, 2023 | Jiri Smejkal | Ottawa Senators | IK Oskarshamn | SHL | |
| May 8, 2023 | Andre Heim | St. Louis Blues | HC Ambri-Piotta | NL | |
| May 10, 2023 | Matt Tomkins | Tampa Bay Lightning | Farjestad BK | SHL | |
| May 19, 2023 | Kyle MacLean | New York Islanders | Bridgeport Islanders | AHL | |
| May 25, 2023 | Nikolas Matinpalo | Ottawa Senators | Porin Assat | Liiga | |

== Trades ==
* Retained Salary Transaction: Each team is allowed up to three contracts on their payroll where they have retained salary in a trade (i.e. the player no longer plays with Team A due to a trade to Team B, but Team A still retains some salary). Only up to 50% of a player's contract can be kept, and only up to 15% of a team's salary cap can be taken up by retained salary. A contract can only be involved in one of these trades twice.

Hover over retained salary or conditional transactions for more information.

=== July ===
| July 7, 2022 | To Colorado Avalanche Alexandar Georgiev | To New York Rangers 3rd-round pick in 2022; 5th-round pick in 2022; 3rd-round pick in 2023 |
| July 7, 2022 | To Chicago Blackhawks 1st-round pick in 2022; 2nd-round pick in 2022; 3rd-round pick in 2024 | To Ottawa Senators Alex DeBrincat |
| July 7, 2022 | To Montreal Canadiens 1st-round pick in 2022 | To New York Islanders Alexander Romanov; 4th-round pick in 2022 |
| July 7, 2022 | To Chicago Blackhawks NYI 1st-round pick in 2022; 3rd-round pick in 2022 | To Montreal Canadiens Kirby Dach |
| July 7, 2022 | To Chicago Blackhawks Petr Mrazek; 1st-round pick in 2022 | To Toronto Maple Leafs 2nd-round pick in 2022 |
| July 7, 2022 | To Arizona Coyotes Zack Kassian; 1st-round pick in 2022; 3rd-round pick in 2024; 2nd-round pick in 2025 | To Edmonton Oilers COL 1st-round pick in 2022 |
| July 8, 2022 | To Detroit Red Wings Ville Husso | To St. Louis Blues 3rd-round pick in 2022 |
| July 8, 2022 | To New Jersey Devils Vitek Vanecek; WPG 2nd-round pick in 2022 | To Washington Capitals 2nd-round pick in 2022; 3rd-round pick in 2022 |
| July 8, 2022 | To Carolina Hurricanes 4th-round pick in 2022 conditional FLA 3rd-round pick in 2023 or NYR 3rd-round pick in 2023 or PHI 3rd-round pick in 2023; 2nd-round pick in 2024 | To Philadelphia Flyers Tony DeAngelo; 7th-round pick in 2022 |
| July 8, 2022 | To Nashville Predators John Leonard; 3rd-round pick in 2023 | To San Jose Sharks Luke Kunin |
| July 8, 2022 | To Chicago Blackhawks Liam Gorman | To Pittsburgh Penguins 6th-round pick in 2022 |
| July 11, 2022 | To Ottawa Senators Future considerations | To Toronto Maple Leafs Matt Murray*; 3rd-round pick in 2023; 7th-round pick in 2024 |
| July 12, 2022 | To Minnesota Wild Filip Gustavsson | To Ottawa Senators Cam Talbot |
| July 13, 2022 | To Boston Bruins Pavel Zacha | To New Jersey Devils Erik Haula |
| July 13, 2022 | To Carolina Hurricanes Brent Burns*; Lane Pederson | To San Jose Sharks Steven Lorentz; Eetu Makiniemi conditional CAR 3rd-round pick in 2023 or PHI 3rd-round pick in 2023 |
| July 13, 2022 | To Arizona Coyotes Patrik Nemeth conditional 3rd-round pick in 2024 or 2nd-round pick in 2026; 2nd-round pick in 2025 | To New York Rangers Ty Emberson |
| July 13, 2022 | To Carolina Hurricanes Dylan Coghlan; Max Pacioretty | To Vegas Golden Knights Future considerations |
| July 13, 2022 | To Ottawa Senators 2nd-round pick in 2024 | To Washington Capitals Connor Brown |
| July 16, 2022 | To New Jersey Devils John Marino | To Pittsburgh Penguins Ty Smith; 3rd-round pick in 2023 |
| July 16, 2022 | To Montreal Canadiens Mike Matheson; 4th-round pick in 2023 | To Pittsburgh Penguins Jeff Petry; Ryan Poehling |
| July 22, 2022 | To Columbus Blue Jackets 3rd-round pick in 2023; 4th-round pick in 2023 | To Seattle Kraken Oliver Bjorkstrand |
| July 22, 2022 | To Calgary Flames Jonathan Huberdeau; Cole Schwindt; MacKenzie Weegar conditional 1st-round pick in 2025 or 1st-round pick in 2026 | To Florida Panthers Matthew Tkachuk conditional 4th-round pick in 2025 or 4th-round pick in 2026 |

==== Pick-only trades ====
| July 7, 2022 | To Arizona Coyotes 1st-round pick in 2022 (#11 overall) | To San Jose Sharks CAR 1st-round pick in 2022 (#27 overall); 2nd-round pick in 2022 (#34 overall); NYI 2nd-round pick in 2022 (#45 overall) |
| July 8, 2022 | To Toronto Maple Leafs NYR 3rd-round pick in 2022 (#95 overall); CHI 5th-round pick in 2022 (#135 overall) | To Vegas Golden Knights WPG 3rd-round pick in 2022 (#79 overall) |
| July 8, 2022 | To Los Angeles Kings CHI 4th-round pick in 2022 (#103 overall); DET 6th-round pick in 2022 (#169 overall) | To Tampa Bay Lightning PIT 3rd-round pick in 2022 (#86 overall) |
| July 8, 2022 | To Boston Bruins WSH 4th-round pick in 2022 (#117 overall); 5th-round pick in 2022 (#132 overall) | To Seattle Kraken CGY 3rd-round pick in 2022 (#91 overall) |
| July 8, 2022 | To Arizona Coyotes EDM 3rd-round pick in 2022 (#94 overall) | To Chicago Blackhawks DAL 3rd-round pick in 2023 |
| July 8, 2022 | To Nashville Predators 4th-round pick in 2023 | To Toronto Maple Leafs TOR 4th-round pick in 2022 (#122 overall) |
| July 8, 2022 | To Montreal Canadiens 4th-round pick in 2023 | To Vegas Golden Knights TBL 4th-round pick in 2022 (#128 overall) |
| July 8, 2022 | To Columbus Blue Jackets BUF 5th-round pick in 2022 (#138 overall) | To San Jose Sharks 5th-round pick in 2023 |
| July 8, 2022 | To Carolina Hurricanes 6th-round pick in 2023 | To Chicago Blackhawks 6th-round pick in 2022 (#188 overall) |
| July 8, 2022 | To Arizona Coyotes 7th-round pick in 2022 (#204 overall) | To San Jose Sharks VAN 7th-round pick in 2023 |
| July 8, 2022 | To Florida Panthers 7th-round pick in 2022 (#214 overall) | To Pittsburgh Penguins 7th-round pick in 2023 |
| July 8, 2022 | To Boston Bruins 7th-round pick in 2023 | To Los Angeles Kings 7th-round pick in 2022 (#215 overall) |

=== August ===
| August 18, 2022 | To Calgary Flames Future considerations | To Montreal Canadiens Sean Monahan conditional CGY 1st-round pick in 2024 or CGY 1st-round pick in 2025 or FLA 1st-round pick in 2025 or CGY 1st-round pick in 2026 or FLA 1st-round pick in 2026 conditional CGY 3rd-round pick in 2025 conditional CGY 4th-round pick in 2025 |
| August 29, 2022 | To San Jose Sharks 4th-round pick in 2024 | To Vegas Golden Knights Adin Hill |
| August 31, 2022 | To Anaheim Ducks Dmitry Kulikov | To Minnesota Wild Future considerations |

=== September ===
| September 19, 2022 | To Dallas Stars Nils Lundkvist | To New York Rangers conditional 1st-round pick in 2023 or 1st-round pick in 2024 conditional 3rd-round pick in 2025 or 4th-round pick in 2025 |

=== October ===
| October 7, 2022 | To Chicago Blackhawks Jason Dickinson; 2nd-round pick in 2024 | To Vancouver Canucks Riley Stillman |
| October 9, 2022 | To Edmonton Oilers Klim Kostin | To St. Louis Blues Dmitri Samorukov |
| October 26, 2022 | To Chicago Blackhawks Cam Hillis | To Montreal Canadiens Nicolas Beaudin |
| October 26, 2022 | To Chicago Blackhawks Cooper Zech | To Philadelphia Flyers Evan Barratt |
| October 27, 2022 | To Boston Bruins Michael DiPietro; Jonathan Myrenberg | To Vancouver Canucks Jack Studnicka |
| October 28, 2022 | To Carolina Hurricanes 5th-round pick in 2023 | To Vancouver Canucks Ethan Bear*; Lane Pederson |

=== November ===
| November 23, 2022 | To Minnesota Wild Ryan Reaves | To New York Rangers 5th-round pick in 2025 |
| November 23, 2022 | To Arizona Coyotes Curtis Douglas | To Toronto Maple Leafs Conor Timmins |
| November 30, 2022 | To Carolina Hurricanes Zack Hayes | To Vegas Golden Knights Future considerations |

=== December ===
| December 15, 2022 | To Buffalo Sabres Joseph Cecconi | To Dallas Stars Oskari Laaksonen |
| December 19, 2022 | To Colorado Avalanche Denis Malgin | To Toronto Maple Leafs Dryden Hunt |
| December 19, 2022 | To Detroit Red Wings Michael Del Zotto | To Florida Panthers Givani Smith |
| December 19, 2022 | To Anaheim Ducks Michael Del Zotto | To Detroit Red Wings Danny O'Regan |

=== January ===
| January 18, 2023 | To Detroit Red Wings Jasper Weatherby | To San Jose Sharks Kyle Criscuolo |
| January 25, 2023 | To Colorado Avalanche Ryan Merkley; Matt Nieto | To San Jose Sharks Martin Kaut; Jacob MacDonald |
| January 30, 2023 | To New York Islanders Bo Horvat* | To Vancouver Canucks Anthony Beauvillier; Aatu Raty conditional 1st-round pick in 2023 or 1st-round pick in 2024 |

=== February ===
| February 5, 2023 | To San Jose Sharks conditional COL 4th-round pick in 2023 or SEA 4th-round pick in 2023 | To Seattle Kraken Jaycob Megna |
| February 9, 2023 | To New York Rangers Niko Mikkola; Vladimir Tarasenko* | To St. Louis Blues Sammy Blais; Hunter Skinner conditional DAL 1st-round pick in 2023 or NYR 1st-round pick in 2023 conditional 3rd-round pick in 2024 or 4th-round pick in 2024 |
| February 17, 2023 | To Minnesota Wild Ryan O'Reilly* | To St. Louis Blues Josh Pillar |
| February 17, 2023 | To Minnesota Wild 4th-round pick in 2025 | To Toronto Maple Leafs Ryan O'Reilly* |
| February 17, 2023 | To St. Louis Blues Mikhail Abramov; Adam Gaudette; 1st-round pick in 2023; OTT 3rd-round pick in 2023; 2nd-round pick in 2024 | To Toronto Maple Leafs Noel Acciari; Josh Pillar |
| February 19, 2023 | To New York Rangers Tyler Motte | To Ottawa Senators Julien Gauthier conditional NYR 6th-round pick in 2023 or WPG 6th-round pick in 2023 or 7th-round pick in 2023 |
| February 22, 2023 | To Arizona Coyotes Shea Weber; 5th-round pick in 2023 | To Vegas Golden Knights Dysin Mayo |
| February 22, 2023 | To Chicago Blackhawks Nikita Zaitsev; 2nd-round pick in 2023; 4th-round pick in 2026 | To Ottawa Senators Future considerations |
| February 23, 2023 | To Anaheim Ducks Josiah Slavin | To Chicago Blackhawks Hunter Drew |
| February 23, 2023 | To Minnesota Wild Dmitry Orlov* | To Washington Capitals Andrei Svetlakov |
| February 23, 2023 | To Boston Bruins Garnet Hathaway; Andrei Svetlakov | To Washington Capitals Craig Smith; 1st-round pick in 2023; 3rd-round pick in 2024; 2nd-round pick in 2025 |
| February 23, 2023 | To Boston Bruins Dmitry Orlov* | To Minnesota Wild 5th-round pick in 2023 |
| February 25, 2023 | To Boston Bruins Shane Bowers | To Colorado Avalanche Keith Kinkaid |
| February 25, 2023 | To New York Rangers Will Lockwood; 7th-round pick in 2026 | To Vancouver Canucks Vitali Kravtsov |
| February 25, 2023 | To Nashville Predators 2nd-round pick in 2024 | To Winnipeg Jets Nino Niederreiter |
| February 26, 2023 | To Dallas Stars Evgenii Dadonov* | To Montreal Canadiens Denis Gurianov |
| February 26, 2023 | To St. Louis Blues Zach Dean | To Vegas Golden Knights Ivan Barbashev |
| February 26, 2023 | To Chicago Blackhawks Andreas Englund | To Colorado Avalanche Jack Johnson |
| February 26, 2023 | To New Jersey Devils Zachary Emond; Scott Harrington; Santeri Hatakka; Timur Ibragimov; Timo Meier*; COL 5th-round pick in 2024 | To San Jose Sharks Andreas Johnsson; Shakir Mukhamadullin; Nikita Okhotiuk; Fabian Zetterlund conditional 1st-round pick in 2023 or 1st-round pick in 2024 conditional 1st-round pick in 2024 or 2nd-round pick in 2024 or 1st-round pick in 2025; 7th-round pick in 2024 |
| February 26, 2023 | To Nashville Predators Cal Foote; 3rd-round pick in 2023; 4th-round pick in 2023; 5th-round pick in 2023; 2nd-round pick in 2024 conditional 1st-round pick in 2025 or 1st-round pick in 2027 | To Tampa Bay Lightning Tanner Jeannot |
| February 26, 2023 | To Nashville Predators Isaac Ratcliffe | To Philadelphia Flyers Future considerations |
| February 27, 2023 | To Chicago Blackhawks Joey Anderson; Pavel Gogolev conditional 1st-round pick in 2025 or 1st-round pick in 2026; 2nd-round pick in 2026 | To Toronto Maple Leafs Sam Lafferty; Jake McCabe* conditional 5th-round pick in 2024 conditional 3rd-round pick in 2025 or 5th-round pick in 2025 |
| February 27, 2023 | To Buffalo Sabres Riley Stillman | To Vancouver Canucks Josh Bloom |
| February 28, 2023 | To Carolina Hurricanes Jesse Puljujarvi | To Edmonton Oilers Patrik Puistola |
| February 28, 2023 | To Anaheim Ducks 3rd-round pick in 2024 | To San Jose Sharks Henry Thrun |
| February 28, 2023 | To Minnesota Wild Marcus Johansson | To Washington Capitals 3rd-round pick in 2024 |
| February 28, 2023 | To Toronto Maple Leafs Erik Gustafsson; BOS 1st-round pick in 2023 | To Washington Capitals Rasmus Sandin |
| February 28, 2023 | To New York Islanders Pierre Engvall | To Toronto Maple Leafs 3rd-round pick in 2024 |
| February 28, 2023 | To Toronto Maple Leafs Luke Schenn | To Vancouver Canucks 3rd-round pick in 2023 |
| February 28, 2023 | To Nashville Predators Austin Rueschhoff | To New York Rangers Future considerations |
| February 28, 2023 | To Edmonton Oilers Mattias Ekholm*; 6th-round pick in 2024 | To Nashville Predators Tyson Barrie; Reid Schaefer; 1st-round pick in 2023; 4th-round pick in 2024 |
| February 28, 2023 | To Columbus Blue Jackets BOS 5th-round pick in 2023 | To Minnesota Wild Gustav Nyquist* |
| February 28, 2023 | To Arizona Coyotes Patrick Kane* | To Chicago Blackhawks Vili Saarijarvi |
| February 28, 2023 | To Chicago Blackhawks Andy Welinski conditional 2nd-round pick in 2023 or 1st-round pick in 2024 or 1st-round pick in 2025; 4th-round pick in 2025 | To New York Rangers Cooper Zech |
| February 28, 2023 | To Arizona Coyotes conditional DAL 3rd-round pick in 2025 or NYR 3rd-round pick in 2025 | To New York Rangers Patrick Kane* |

=== March ===
| March 1, 2023 | To Columbus Blue Jackets Jonathan Quick conditional 1st-round pick in 2023 or 2nd-round pick in 2023 and 2nd-round pick in 2024; 3rd-round pick in 2024 | To Los Angeles Kings Vladislav Gavrikov; Joonas Korpisalo |
| March 1, 2023 | To Colorado Avalanche Lars Eller* | To Washington Capitals 2nd-round pick in 2025 |
| March 1, 2023 | To Detroit Red Wings conditional NYI 1st-round pick in 2023 or 1st-round pick in 2024; 2nd-round pick in 2023 | To Vancouver Canucks Filip Hronek*; 4th-round pick in 2023 |
| March 1, 2023 | To Arizona Coyotes 3rd-round pick in 2026 | To Carolina Hurricanes Shayne Gostisbehere |
| March 1, 2023 | To Arizona Coyotes conditional 1st-round pick in 2023 or 1st-round pick in 2024 conditional OTT 1st-round pick in 2024 or WSH 2nd-round pick in 2024 or OTT 1st-round pick in 2025; 2nd-round pick in 2026 | To Ottawa Senators Jakob Chychrun |
| March 1, 2023 | To Buffalo Sabres 3rd-round pick in 2023 | To Los Angeles Kings Erik Portillo |
| March 1, 2023 | To Pittsburgh Penguins Peter DiLiberatore; 3rd-round pick in 2024 | To Vegas Golden Knights Teddy Blueger |
| March 1, 2023 | To San Jose Sharks Vladislav Namestnikov* | To Tampa Bay Lightning Mikey Eyssimont |
| March 1, 2023 | To Nashville Predators 2nd-round pick in 2023 | To Pittsburgh Penguins Mikael Granlund |
| March 2, 2023 | To Boston Bruins Tyler Bertuzzi* | To Detroit Red Wings conditional 1st-round pick in 2024 or 1st-round pick in 2025; 4th-round pick in 2025 |
| March 2, 2023 | To Arizona Coyotes Jakub Voracek; 6th-round pick in 2023 | To Columbus Blue Jackets Jon Gillies |
| March 2, 2023 | To Columbus Blue Jackets Michael Hutchinson; 7th-round pick in 2025 | To Vegas Golden Knights Jonathan Quick* |
| March 2, 2023 | To Buffalo Sabres Future considerations | To Chicago Blackhawks Anders Bjork |
| March 2, 2023 | To Arizona Coyotes Michael Kesselring; 3rd-round pick in 2023 | To Edmonton Oilers Nick Bjugstad*; Cam Dineen |
| March 2, 2023 | To Anaheim Ducks Dylan Sikura | To Chicago Blackhawks Maxim Golod |
| March 2, 2023 | To Chicago Blackhawks Anton Khudobin; 2nd-round pick in 2025 | To Dallas Stars Max Domi; Dylan Wells |
| March 3, 2023 | To Detroit Red Wings Dylan McLaughlin; 7th-round pick in 2025 | To St. Louis Blues Jakub Vrana* |
| March 3, 2023 | To New Jersey Devils Curtis Lazar | To Vancouver Canucks 4th-round pick in 2024 |
| March 3, 2023 | To Los Angeles Kings Zack MacEwen | To Philadelphia Flyers Brendan Lemieux; 5th-round pick in 2024 |
| March 3, 2023 | To San Jose Sharks 4th-round pick in 2025 | To Winnipeg Jets Vladislav Namestnikov |
| March 3, 2023 | To Los Angeles Kings Nate Schnarr | To Montreal Canadiens Frederic Allard |
| March 3, 2023 | To Montreal Canadiens Nick Bonino; 5th-round pick in 2024 | To San Jose Sharks Arvid Henrikson |
| March 3, 2023 | To Pittsburgh Penguins Tony Sund | To San Jose Sharks 7th-round pick in 2023 conditional 4th-round pick in 2024 or 5th-round pick in 2024 |
| March 3, 2023 | To Montreal Canadiens Tony Sund | To Pittsburgh Penguins Nick Bonino* |
| March 3, 2023 | To Buffalo Sabres Jordan Greenway | To Minnesota Wild VGK 2nd-round pick in 2023; 5th-round pick in 2024 |
| March 3, 2023 | To Anaheim Ducks Chase Priskie | To Buffalo Sabres Austin Strand |
| March 3, 2023 | To Calgary Flames Dryden Hunt | To Toronto Maple Leafs Radim Zohorna |
| March 3, 2023 | To Dallas Stars Scott Reedy | To San Jose Sharks Jacob Peterson |
| March 3, 2023 | To Detroit Red Wings 4th-round pick in 2023 | To Minnesota Wild Oskar Sundqvist |
| March 3, 2023 | To Ottawa Senators Patrick Brown | To Philadelphia Flyers 6th-round pick in 2023 |
| March 3, 2023 | To Chicago Blackhawks Austin Wagner | To Los Angeles Kings Future considerations |
| March 3, 2023 | To Buffalo Sabres 7th-round pick in 2025 | To Nashville Predators Rasmus Asplund |
| March 3, 2023 | To Arizona Coyotes Connor Mackey; Brett Ritchie | To Calgary Flames Nick Ritchie; Troy Stecher |
| March 3, 2023 | To Anaheim Ducks Nikita Nesterenko; Andrej Sustr; 4th-round pick in 2025 | To Minnesota Wild John Klingberg* |
| March 3, 2023 | To Anaheim Ducks Brock McGinn; 3rd-round pick in 2024 | To Pittsburgh Penguins Dmitry Kulikov* |
| March 3, 2023 | To Colorado Avalanche Gustav Rydahl | To New York Rangers Anton Blidh |
| March 3, 2023 | To New York Rangers Wyatt Kalynuk | To Vancouver Canucks Future considerations |
| March 8, 2023 | To Nashville Predators Anthony Angello | To St. Louis Blues Future considerations |
| March 9, 2023 | To Arizona Coyotes Steven Kampfer | To Detroit Red Wings Future considerations |
| March 10, 2023 | To Carolina Hurricanes Jack Dugan | To New Jersey Devils Zack Hayes |
| March 10, 2023 | To New Jersey Devils Jayce Hawryluk | To Ottawa Senators Future considerations |
| March 10, 2023 | To Calgary Flames Kristians Rubins | To Ottawa Senators Future considerations |
| March 20, 2023 | To Florida Panthers Future considerations | To Los Angeles Kings Cole Krygier |
| March 31, 2023 | To Anaheim Ducks Judd Caulfield | To Pittsburgh Penguins Thimo Nickl |

=== May ===
| May 31, 2023 | To Edmonton Oilers Jayden Grubbe | To New York Rangers 5th-round pick in 2023 |

=== June ===
| June 6, 2023 | To Los Angeles Kings Hayden Hodgson; Ivan Provorov | To Philadelphia Flyers Helge Grans; Cal Petersen; Sean Walker; 2nd-round pick in 2024 |
| June 6, 2023 | To Columbus Blue Jackets Kevin Connauton | To Philadelphia Flyers LAK 1st-round pick in 2023 conditional 2nd-round pick in 2024 or 2nd-round pick in 2025 |
| June 6, 2023 | To Columbus Blue Jackets Ivan Provorov* | To Los Angeles Kings Kevin Connauton |
| June 9, 2023 | To Columbus Blue Jackets Damon Severson | To New Jersey Devils CGY 3rd-round pick in 2023 |
| June 15, 2023 | To Colorado Avalanche Fredrik Olofsson | To Dallas Stars Future considerations |
| June 24, 2023 | To Colorado Avalanche Ryan Johansen* | To Nashville Predators Alex Galchenyuk |
| June 24, 2023 | To Arizona Coyotes Sean Durzi | To Los Angeles Kings MTL 2nd-round pick in 2024 |
| June 26, 2023 | To Boston Bruins Ian Mitchell; Alec Regula | To Chicago Blackhawks Nick Foligno; Taylor Hall |
| June 26, 2023 | To Boston Bruins Reilly Walsh | To New Jersey Devils Shane Bowers |
| June 27, 2023 | To Philadelphia Flyers 6th-round pick in 2024 | To St. Louis Blues Kevin Hayes* |
| June 27, 2023 | To Colorado Avalanche Gianni Fairbrother; FLA 1st-round pick in 2023; 2nd-round pick in 2023 | To Montreal Canadiens Alex Newhook |
| June 27, 2023 | To Los Angeles Kings Pierre-Luc Dubois | To Winnipeg Jets Alex Iafallo; Rasmus Kupari; Gabriel Vilardi; MTL 2nd-round pick in 2024 |
| June 27, 2023 | To Anaheim Ducks Andrew Agozzino | To San Jose Sharks Andrej Sustr |
| June 27, 2023 | To New Jersey Devils 6th-round pick in 2023 | To San Jose Sharks Mackenzie Blackwood |
| June 27, 2023 | To Calgary Flames Yegor Sharangovich; CGY 3rd-round pick in 2023 | To New Jersey Devils Tyler Toffoli |

== Waivers ==
Once an NHL player has played in a certain number of games or a set number of seasons has passed since the signing of his first NHL contract (see here), that player must be offered to all of the other NHL teams before he can be assigned to a minor league affiliate.

| Date | Player | New team | Previous team | Ref |
|---|---|---|---|---|
| September 30, 2022 | Jonas Johansson | Arizona Coyotes | Colorado Avalanche | |
| October 3, 2022 | Magnus Hellberg | Ottawa Senators | Seattle Kraken | |
| October 3, 2022 | Radim Zohorna | Calgary Flames | Pittsburgh Penguins | |
| October 8, 2022 | Johnathan Kovacevic | Montreal Canadiens | Winnipeg Jets | |
| October 9, 2022 | Juuso Valimaki | Arizona Coyotes | Calgary Flames | |
| October 10, 2022 | Connor Ingram | Arizona Coyotes | Nashville Predators | |
| October 10, 2022 | Axel Jonsson-Fjallby | Winnipeg Jets | Washington Capitals | |
| October 10, 2022 | Brett Leason | Anaheim Ducks | Washington Capitals | |
| October 10, 2022 | Josh Mahura | Florida Panthers | Anaheim Ducks | |
| October 10, 2022 | Jarred Tinordi | Chicago Blackhawks | New York Rangers | |
| October 12, 2022 | Jonas Johansson | Colorado Avalanche | Arizona Coyotes | |
| October 19, 2022 | Lukas Sedlak | Philadelphia Flyers | Colorado Avalanche | |
| October 20, 2022 | Dryden Hunt | Colorado Avalanche | New York Rangers | |
| October 27, 2022 | Kieffer Bellows | Philadelphia Flyers | New York Islanders | |
| November 5, 2022 | Nicolas Aube-Kubel | Washington Capitals | Toronto Maple Leafs | |
| November 10, 2022 | Magnus Hellberg | Seattle Kraken | Ottawa Senators | |
| November 12, 2022 | Rudolfs Balcers | Tampa Bay Lightning | Florida Panthers | |
| November 19, 2022 | Tyson Jost | Buffalo Sabres | Minnesota Wild | |
| November 23, 2022 | Magnus Hellberg | Detroit Red Wings | Seattle Kraken | |
| December 6, 2022 | Jayson Megna | Anaheim Ducks | Colorado Avalanche | |
| December 12, 2022 | Eeli Tolvanen | Seattle Kraken | Nashville Predators | |
| December 13, 2022 | Karson Kuhlman | Winnipeg Jets | Seattle Kraken | |
| January 6, 2023 | Mikey Eyssimont | San Jose Sharks | Winnipeg Jets | |
| January 11, 2023 | Casey Fitzgerald | Florida Panthers | Buffalo Sabres | |
| January 11, 2023 | Jake Leschyshyn | New York Rangers | Vegas Golden Knights | |
| January 28, 2023 | Lane Pederson | Columbus Blue Jackets | Vancouver Canucks | |
| February 23, 2023 | Chris Tierney | Montreal Canadiens | Florida Panthers | |
| February 25, 2023 | Kasperi Kapanen | St. Louis Blues | Pittsburgh Penguins | |
| February 28, 2023 | Scott Harrington | Anaheim Ducks | New Jersey Devils | |

== See also ==
- 2022 NHL entry draft
- 2023 NHL entry draft
- 2022 in ice hockey
- 2023 in ice hockey
- 2021–22 NHL transactions
- 2023–24 NHL transactions
