= Ville Koivunen =

Finnish ice hockey player (born 2003)

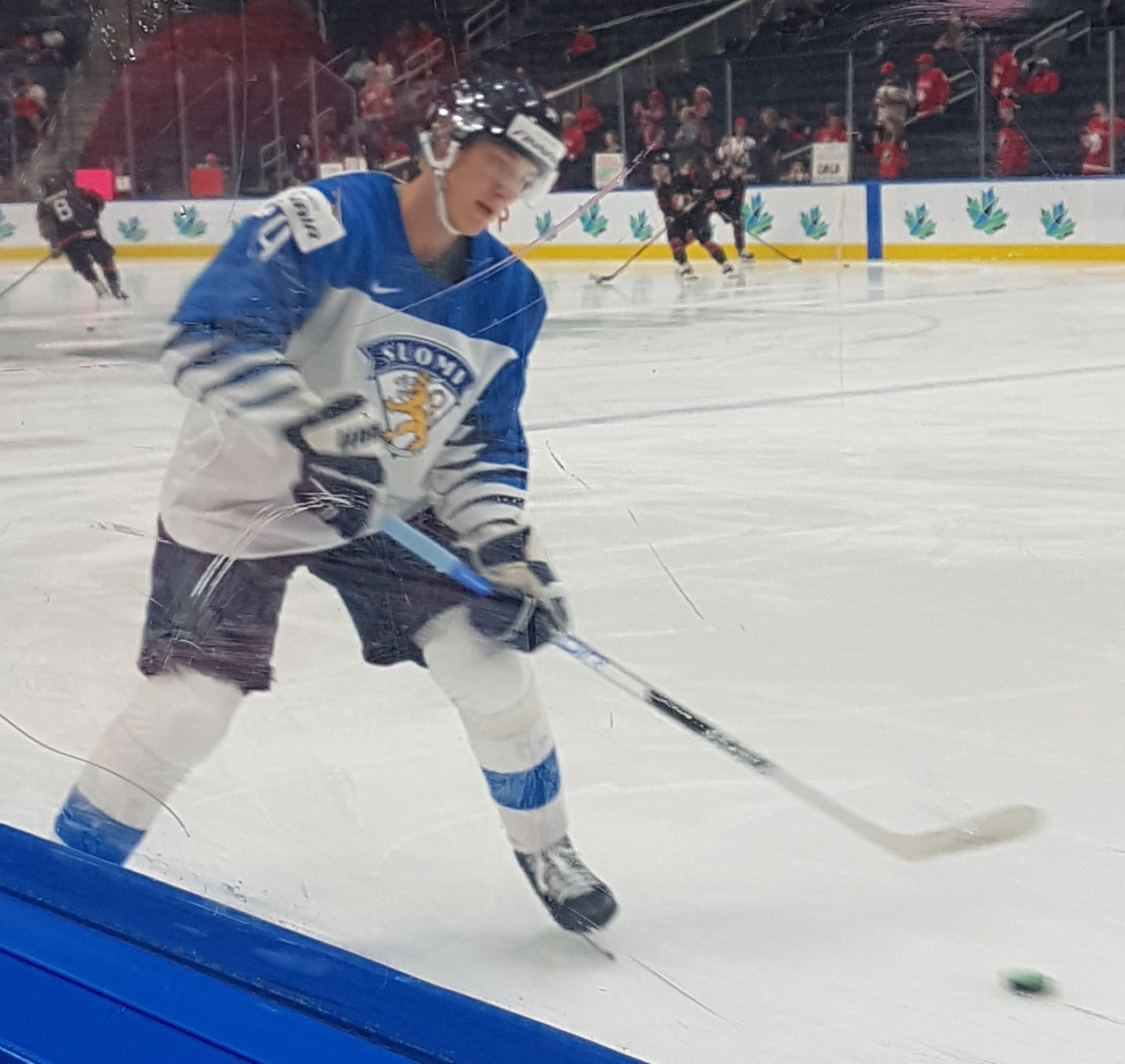
- Koivunen at the 2022 World Junior Championships
- Born: 13 June 2003 (age 23) Oulu, Finland
- Height: 6 ft 0 in (183 cm)
- Weight: 184 lb (83 kg; 13 st 2 lb)
- Position: Forward
- Shoots: Left
- NHL team Former teams: Pittsburgh Penguins; Oulun Kärpät
- NHL draft: 51st overall, 2021; Carolina Hurricanes
- Playing career: 2021–present

Ville Koivunen (born 13 June 2003) is a Finnish professional ice hockey player who is a forward for the Pittsburgh Penguins of the National Hockey League (NHL). He was drafted in the second round, 51st overall, by the Carolina Hurricanes in the 2021 NHL entry draft.

== Playing career ==
During the 2020–21 season, he served as an alternate captain and recorded 23 goals and 26 assists in 38 games with Oulun Kärpät's junior team in Finland's top junior league, U20 SM-sarja. He was subsequently named the league's Rookie of the Year and selected to the Second All-Star Team after he ranked third in the league in goals and points.

In May 2021, Koivunen signed a three-year contract with Kärpät. In July, he was drafted in the second round, 51st overall, by the Carolina Hurricanes in the 2021 NHL entry draft. On 15 August 2021, the Hurricanes signed Koivunen to a three-year, entry-level contract. He made his professional debut for Kärpät during the 2021–22 season; he was a finalist for the Jarmo Wasama Memorial Trophy, awarded to the Liiga rookie of the year.

On 7 March 2024, Koivunen was traded to the Pittsburgh Penguins, along with Michael Bunting, Cruz Lucius, Vasili Ponomaryov and two conditional 2024 draft picks, in exchange for Jake Guentzel and Ty Smith.

Koivunen began the 2024–25 season with the Penguins' AHL affiliate, the Wilkes-Barre/Scranton Penguins. On 29 March 2025, Koivunen was recalled by the Penguins. Prior to being recalled he recorded 21 goals and 34 assists in 62 games. His 21 goals are the most by a WBS rookie player since Daniel Sprong scored 32 goals during the 2017–18 season. He made his NHL debut the next day in a game against the Ottawa Senators. On 3 April 2025, in a game against the St. Louis Blues, he scored his first career NHL point, recording the primary assist on Rutger McGroarty's first career NHL goal. He ultimately appeared in seven NHL games during the season, recording five assists. In the AHL, he led Wilkes-Barre/Scranton in scoring, and was named to the league's All-Rookie Team.

== International play ==
Medal record

Representing Finland

Ice hockey

World Junior Championships
Silver medal – second place	2022 Canada	

Koivunen represented Finland under-18 team at the 2021 IIHF World U18 Championships where he recorded four goals and six assists in seven games. He represented Finland junior team at the 2022 World Junior Championships and won a silver medal.

== Career statistics ==
=== Regular season and playoffs ===
			Regular season					Playoffs
Season	Team	League	GP	G	A	Pts	PIM	GP	G	A	Pts	PIM
2020–21	Oulun Kärpät	U20	38	23	26	49	16	5	0	4	4	0
2021–22	Oulun Kärpät	Liiga	53	11	18	29	20	6	1	0	1	0
2022–23	Oulun Kärpät	Liiga	52	12	16	28	26	3	0	1	1	0
2022–23	Chicago Wolves	AHL	12	1	0	1	4	—	—	—	—	—
2023–24	Oulun Kärpät	Liiga	59	22	34	56	26	12	5	8	13	14
2023–24	Wilkes-Barre/Scranton Penguins	AHL	—	—	—	—	—	2	1	1	2	2
2024–25	Wilkes-Barre/Scranton Penguins	AHL	63	21	35	56	52	2	0	2	2	2
2024–25	Pittsburgh Penguins	NHL	8	0	7	7	4	—	—	—	—	—
2025–26	Pittsburgh Penguins	NHL	39	2	5	7	10	—	—	—	—	—
2025–26	Wilkes-Barre/Scranton Penguins	AHL	34	13	28	41	42	15	4	5	9	6
Liiga totals			164	45	68	113	72	21	6	9	15	14
NHL totals			47	2	12	14	14	—	—	—	—	—

=== International ===
Year	Team	Event	Result	GP	G	A	Pts	PIM
2019	Finland	U17	7th	5	0	2	2	2
2021	Finland	U18	4th	7	4	6	10	0
2022	Finland	WJC	2nd place, silver medalist(s)	6	0	0	0	0
2023	Finland	WJC	5th	5	0	2	2	0
Junior totals				23	4	10	14	2
