= 2021–22 Liiga season =

2021–22 Liiga
- League: Liiga
- Sport: Ice hockey
- Duration: September 2021 – April 2022
- Number of teams: 15
- TV partner(s): Telia; C More

Regular season
- Best record: Tappara
- Runners-up: Jukurit
- Season MVP: Petrus Palmu (Jukurit)
- Top scorer: Anton Levtchi (Tappara)

Playoffs
- Playoffs MVP: Joona Luoto (Tappara)
- Finals champions: Tappara
- Runners-up: TPS

Liiga seasons
- ← 2020–21 2022–23 →

The 2021–22 Liiga season was the 47th season of the Liiga, the top level of ice hockey in Finland, since the league's formation in 1975.

== Teams ==
Location of teams in 2021–22 Liiga

Team	City	Head coach	Arena	Capacity	Captain
HIFK	Helsinki	Ville Peltonen	Helsingin jäähalli	8,200	Teemu Tallberg
HPK	Hämeenlinna	Matti Tiilikainen	Pohjantähti Areena	5,360	Markus Nenonen
Ilves	Tampere	Jouko Myrrä	Tampereen jäähalli, Hakametsä (September - November 2021); Nokia Arena (December 2021 – present)	7,300; 13,330	Eemeli Suomi
Jukurit	Mikkeli	Olli Jokinen	Ikioma Areena	4,200	Petrus Palmu
JYP	Jyväskylä	Jukka Ahvenjärvi	LähiTapiola Areena	4,437	Jan Ščotka
KalPa	Kuopio	Tommi Miettinen	Olvi Areena	5,300	Tuomas Kiiskinen
KooKoo	Kouvola	Olli Salo	Lumon Areena	5,950	Alexander Bonsaksen
Kärpät	Oulu	Lauri Mikkola	Oulun Energia Areena	6,400	Atte Ohtamaa
Lukko	Rauma	Marko Virtanen	Kivikylän Areena	4,700	Anrei Hakulinen
Pelicans	Lahti	Tommi Niemelä	Isku Areena	5,371	Joonas Jalvanti
SaiPa	Lappeenranta	Pekka Virta	Lappeenrannan jäähalli, Kisapuisto	4,820	Jarno Koskiranta
Sport	Vaasa	Risto Dufva	Vaasan Sähkö Areena	5,185	Erik Riska
Tappara	Tampere	Jussi Tapola	Tampereen jäähalli, Hakametsä (September - November 2021); Nokia Arena (December 2021 – present)	7,300; 13,330	Otto Rauhala
TPS	Turku	Jussi Ahokas	Gatorade Center	11,820	Juhani Jasu
Ässät	Pori	Ari-Pekka Selin and Karri Kivi	Isomäki Areena (renamed to West Areena)	6,350	Jarno Kärki

== Regular season ==
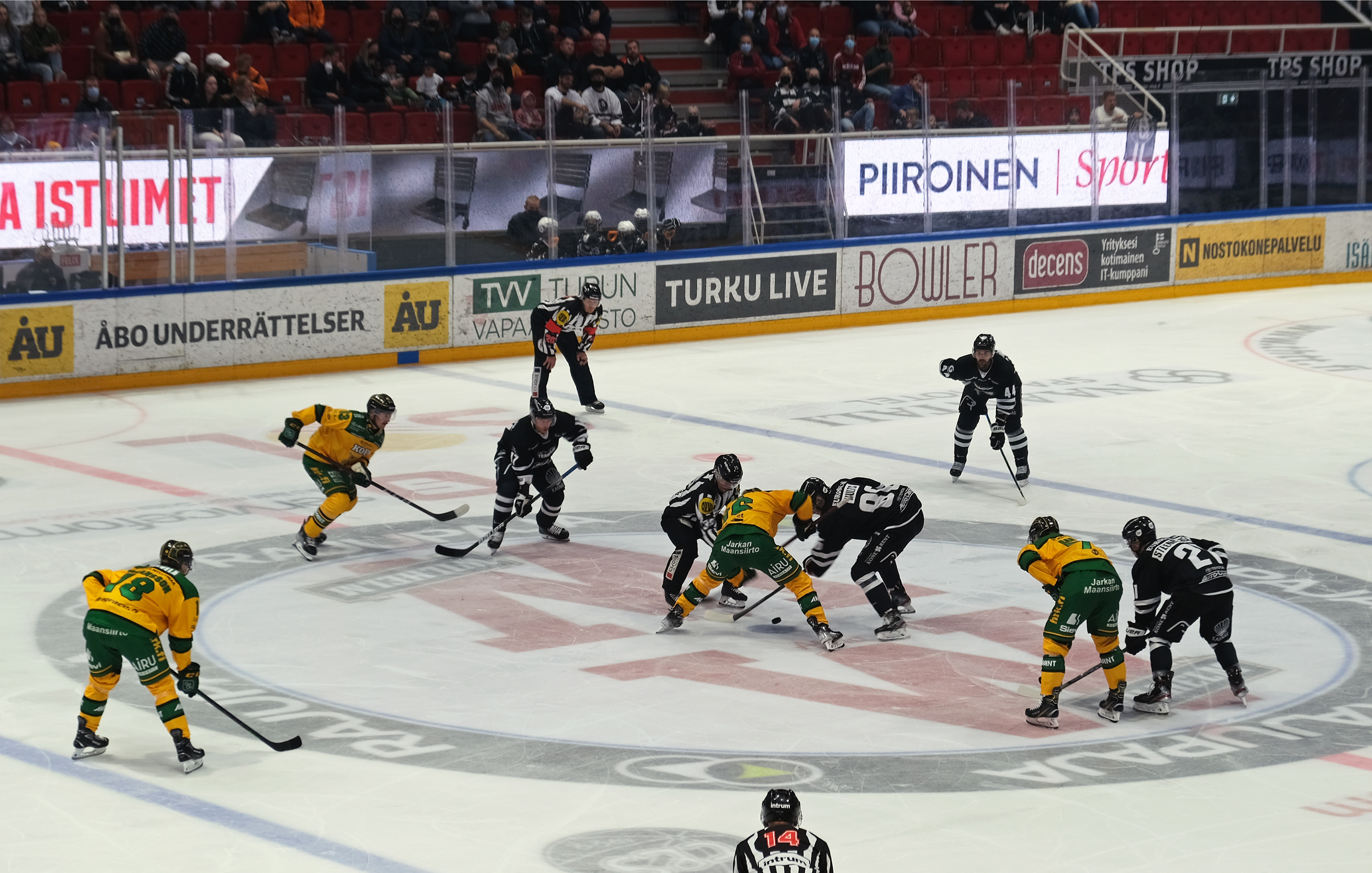
A game between TPS and Ilves on 11 September 2021

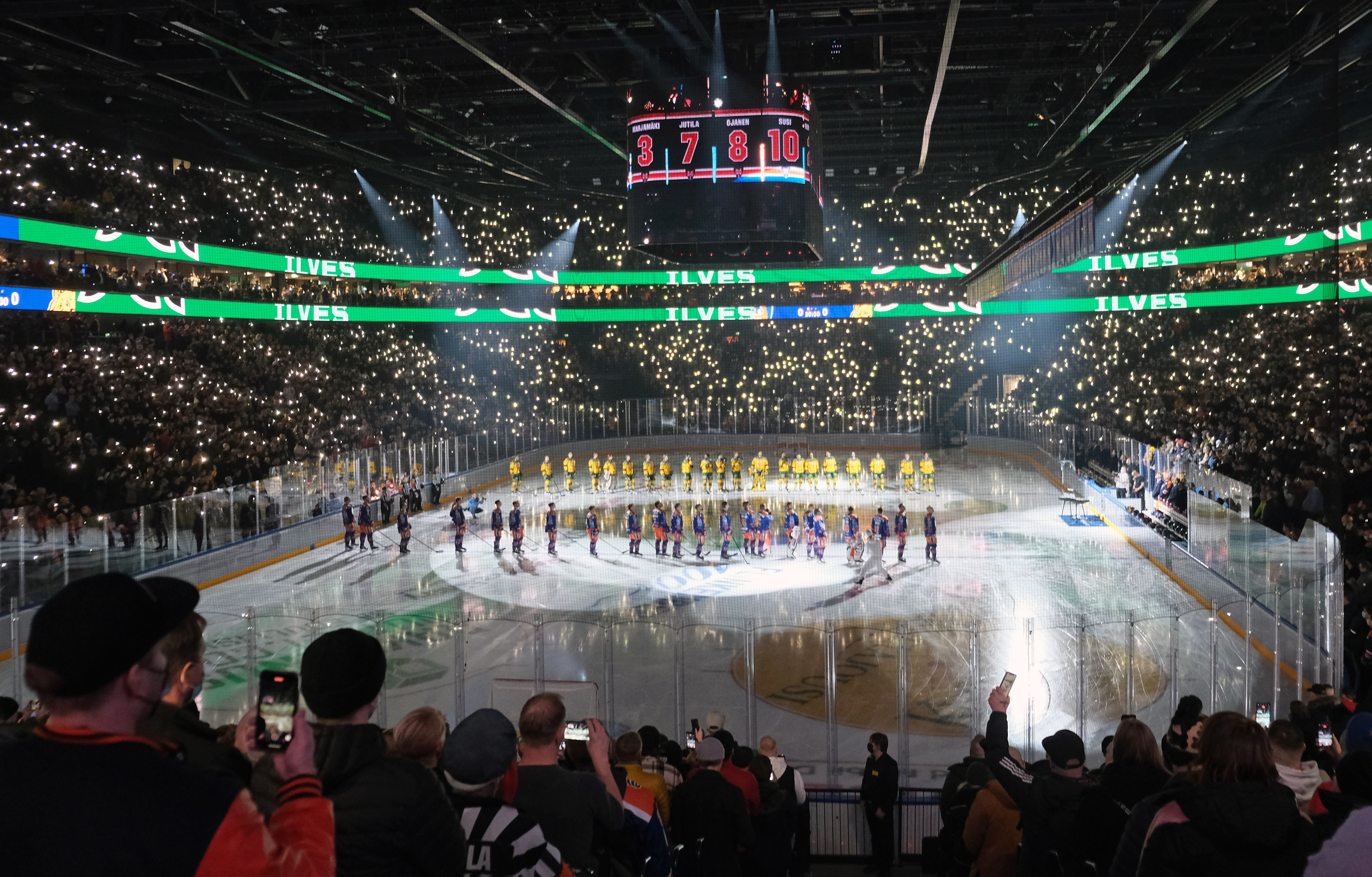
Opening game of new Tampere Deck Arena on 3 December 2021

=== Standings ===
Top six advanced straight to the quarter-finals, while teams between 7th and 10th positions played a wild card round for the final two spots. The Liiga is a closed series and thus there is no relegation. The top 3 teams of the regular season qualified for the Champions Hockey League and the 4th team to the Spengler Cup.

The match program was on hiatus during the EHT, Karjala Cup from 7 to 14 November. In December, Christmas was a week-long match break. In December, a new ice rink named Tampere Deck Arena (Nokia Arena) was opened in Tampere for the use of Ilves and Tappara. Two matches were played in the new arena on 19 February, when Ilves hosts his own in the afternoon and Tappara in the evening.

Pos	Team	Pld	W	OTW	OTL	L	GF	GA	GD	PCT	Final Result
1	Tappara	60	31	9	4	16	188	120	+68	.639	Advance to Quarterfinals
2	Jukurit	60	31	8	4	17	166	138	+28	.628	Advance to Quarterfinals
3	Ilves	60	28	10	7	15	191	168	+23	.617	Advance to Quarterfinals
4	TPS	60	29	6	3	22	151	137	+14	.567	Advance to Quarterfinals
5	HIFK	59	27	5	8	19	174	146	+28	.559	Advance to Quarterfinals
6	Kärpät	60	24	7	9	20	171	141	+30	.528	Advance to Quarterfinals
7	HPK	60	24	9	5	22	147	135	+12	.528	Advance to Wild-card round
8	KooKoo	60	25	5	9	21	148	141	+7	.522	Advance to Wild-card round
9	Pelicans	60	25	4	10	21	142	142	0	.517	Advance to Wild-card round
10	Lukko	58	24	5	7	22	169	151	+18	.511	Advance to Wild-card round
11	KalPa	60	19	9	13	19	167	159	+8	.489	
12	Sport	59	18	8	7	26	120	155	−35	.435	
13	JYP	60	14	8	4	34	139	221	−82	.344	
14	SaiPa	60	15	3	7	35	128	193	−65	.322	
15	Ässät	60	11	7	6	36	127	181	−54	.294	

Source: Liiga
Rules for classification: 1) Points percentage; 2) 3-point wins 3) Goal difference; 4) Goals scored; 5) Head-to-head points.

=== Statistics ===
==== Scoring leaders ====
The following shows the top ten players who led the league in points, at the conclusion of the regular season. If two or more skaters are tied (i.e. same number of points, goals and played games), all of the tied skaters are shown.

Player	Team	GP	G	A	Pts	+/–	PIM
(Finland) Anton Levtchi	Tappara	55	26	35	61	+23	46
(Finland) Petrus Palmu	Jukurit	59	26	33	59	+27	24
(Czech Republic) Lukáš Jašek	Pelicans	54	13	38	51	+23	30
(Canada) Michael Joly	HPK	58	21	29	50	+18	16
(Finland) Eemeli Suomi	Ilves	54	19	30	49	+2	34
(Finland) Jere Innala	HIFK	54	18	30	48	+13	30
(Czech Republic) Jiří Smejkal	Pelicans	44	25	20	45	+16	32
(Finland) Waltteri Merelä	Tappara	57	21	23	44	+31	38
(Finland) Eetu Koivistoinen	HIFK	53	19	24	43	+11	8
(Finland) Vili Saarijärvi	Lukko	52	17	26	43	+19	12

==== Leading goaltenders ====
The following shows the top ten goaltenders who led the league in goals against average, provided that they have played at least 40% of their team's minutes, at the conclusion of games played on 25 September 2021.

Player	Team(s)	GP	TOI	W	T	L	GA	SO	Sv%	GAA
(Finland) Oskari Salminen	Jukurit	5	279:42	1	2	1	7	1	94.35	1.50
(Russia) Andrei Kareyev	TPS	7	415:17	5	0	2	11	0	93.25	1.59
(Finland) Niilo Halonen	HIFK	3	180:00	3	0	0	5	0	89.80	1.67
(Finland) Niclas Westerholm	SaiPa	6	358:06	2	1	3	11	1	90.83	1.84
(Finland) Rasmus Reijola	Sport	3	177:25	2	0	1	6	1	91.89	2.03
(Czech Republic) Nick Malik	KooKoo	4	235:17	2	0	2	8	0	92.16	2.04
(Finland) Jasper Patrikainen	Pelicans	3	142:54	1	2	0	5	0	91.67	2.10
(Russia) Stanislav Galimov	Kärpät	6	366:32	3	3	0	13	0	92.07	2.13
(Finland) Christian Heljanko	Tappara	4	238:58	2	1	1	9	0	86.76	2.26
(Canada) Michael Garteig	HIFK	3	179:43	0	2	1	7	0	88.89	2.34

== Playoffs ==
Contrary to the best of three format used in the past seasons, the wild-card round will take place in best of two format, with overtime only played after the second game if the points are tied. The remaining rounds will be played in the best-of-7 format.

=== Bracket ===
Wild-card round (best-of-2)
7	HPK	0
10	Lukko	1
8	KooKoo	2
9	Pelicans	1

Quarter-finals (best-of-7)
1	Tappara	4
10	Lukko	1
2	Jukurit	3
8	KooKoo	4
3	Ilves	4
6	Kärpät	3
4	TPS	4
5	HIFK	3

Semi-finals (best-of-7)
1	Tappara	4
8	KooKoo	1
(Pairings are re-seeded after the first and second round)
3	Ilves	2
4	TPS	4

Finals (best-of-7)
1	Tappara	4
4	TPS	1
Bronze medal game
3	Ilves	1
8	KooKoo	0

=== Wild-card round ===
The wild-card round series will be decided as a two game series. Compared to normal playoffs format both games can also end on a tie. If after two games both teams have one win or both games have ended on a tie, immediately after the second game an additional game will play played, which will determine the team that will go through to next round. The additional game will be played as five against five game and with 20 minutes periods. Sudden death rule applies. Penalties received during the 2nd game, which have not ended when 2nd game ends, will be cancelled. Only exception is game misconducts, which will carry on to the additional game.

HPK – Lukko 0-1
24.3.2022	Lukko	HPK	3-0 ref
25.3.2022	HPK	Lukko	2-2 ref
Lukko wins the series 1-0.

KooKoo – Pelicans 2-1
24.3.2022	Pelicans	KooKoo	1-2 ref
25.3.2022	KooKoo	Pelicans	2-3 ref
25.3.2022	KooKoo	Pelicans	1-0 ref
KooKoo wins the series 2-1.

=== Quarter-finals ===
Tappara – Lukko 4-1
28.3.2022	Tappara	Lukko	5-3 ref
29.3.2022	Lukko	Tappara	2-1 ref
31.3.2022	Tappara	Lukko	3-1 ref
2.4.2022	Lukko	Tappara	2-3 OT1 ref
3.4.2022	Tappara	Lukko	4-1 ref
Tappara wins the series 4-1.

Ilves – Kärpät 4-3
27.3.2022	Ilves	Kärpät	5-1 ref
28.3.2022	Kärpät	Ilves	1-2 OT1 ref
30.3.2022	Ilves	Kärpät	1-2 OT1 ref
1.4.2022	Kärpät	Ilves	3-2 OT1 ref
2.4.2022	Ilves	Kärpät	1-0 ref
5.4.2022	Kärpät	Ilves	2-1 ref
6.4.2022	Ilves	Kärpät	2-1 OT1 ref
Ilves wins the series 4-3.

Jukurit – KooKoo 3-4
28.3.2022	Jukurit	KooKoo	1-3 ref
29.3.2022	KooKoo	Jukurit	3-2 ref
31.3.2022	Jukurit	KooKoo	1-0 ref
2.4.2022	KooKoo	Jukurit	2-3 OT1 ref
3.4.2022	Jukurit	KooKoo	1-5 ref
5.4.2022	KooKoo	Jukurit	1-2 ref
6.4.2022	Jukurit	KooKoo	0-1 ref
KooKoo wins the series 4-3.

TPS – HIFK 4-3
27.3.2022	TPS	HIFK	2-0 ref
29.3.2022	HIFK	TPS	4-3 OT1 ref
31.3.2022	TPS	HIFK	3-4 OT1 ref
2.4.2022	HIFK	TPS	5-7 ref
3.4.2022	TPS	HIFK	2-1 ref
5.4.2022	HIFK	TPS	3-2 ref
6.4.2022	TPS	HIFK	3-1 ref
TPS wins the series 4-3.

=== Semifinals ===
Tappara – KooKoo 4-1
8.4.2022	Tappara	KooKoo	3-4 OT1 ref
9.4.2022	KooKoo	Tappara	3-6 ref
11.4.2022	Tappara	KooKoo	4-2 ref
12.4.2022	KooKoo	Tappara	1-5 ref
14.4.2022	Tappara	KooKoo	4-1 ref
Tappara wins the series 4-1.

Ilves – TPS 2-4
9.4.2022	Ilves	TPS	3-2 ref
10.4.2022	TPS	Ilves	6-0 ref
12.4.2022	Ilves	TPS	2-3 OT1 ref
13.4.2022	TPS	Ilves	3-0 ref
15.4.2022	Ilves	TPS	3-0 ref
16.4.2022	TPS	Ilves	2-1 ref
TPS wins the series 4-2.

=== Bronze medal game ===
24 April 2022; 17:00	Ilves	3–2 (2–0, 1–2, 0–0)	KooKoo	Nokia Arena, Tampere; Attendance: 11,606

Game reference

Vadim Žerenko
Goalies
Nick Malík
Referees:
Antti Boman
Aaro Brännare
Linesmen:
Samuli Niskanen
Harri Perämäki

S. Balázs (L. Lancaster, E. Päkkilä) – 10:18	1–0
L. Lancaster (J. Oden, H. Haapala) – 17:24	2–0
E. Suomi (S. Johansson, P. Kontiola) (PP1) – 32:05	3–0
	3–1	37:31 – T. Rautiainen (K. Strömberg, J. Antonen) (PP1)
	3–2	38:25 – K. Strömberg (R. Koblížek, R. Tuomola)

2 min
Penalties
12 min
37
Shots
22

=== Finals ===
20 April 2022; 18:30	Tappara	2–1 (1–1, 0–0, 1–0)	TPS	Nokia Arena, Tampere; Attendance: 10,767

Game reference

Christian Heljanko
Goalies
Andrei Kareyev
Referees:
Mikko Kaukokari
Jukka-Pekka Koistinen
Linesmen:
Lauri Nikulainen
Hannu Sormunen

	0–1	05:15 – J. Slafkovský (M. Nurmi, V. Lajunen) (PP2)
A. Levtchi (K. Tanus, O. Leskinen) (PP1) – 19:22	1–1
K. Kuusela (J. Luoto, S. Kinnunen) (PP1) – 49:46	2–1

10 min
Penalties
6 min
18
Shots
18

23 April 2022; 17:00	TPS	1–2 OT1 (0–1, 0–0, 1–0, 0–1)	Tappara	Gatorade Center, Turku; Attendance: 10,500

Game reference

Andrei Kareyev
Goalies
Christian Heljanko
Referees:
Joonas Kova
Petri Lindqvist
Linesmen:
Niko Jusi
Joni Pekkala

	0–1	17:53 – W. Merelä (B. Austin, M. Seppälä)
J. Pärssinen (M. Nurmi, S. Vainionpää) – 54:31	1–1
	1–2	62:41 – C. Bertrand (K. Kuusela, C. Jürgens)

2 min
Penalties
6 min
36
Shots
32

25 April 2022; 18:30	Tappara	3–1 (0–0, 2–0, 1–1)	TPS	Nokia Arena, Tampere; Attendance: 12,075

Game reference

Christian Heljanko
Goalies
Andrei Kareyev
Referees:
Mikko Kaukokari
Jukka-Pekka Koistinen
Linesmen:
Lauri Nikulainen
Hannu Sormunen

V. Savinainen (A. Levtchi, K. Tanus) (PP1) – 31:09	1–0
O. Leskinen (W. Merelä, A. Levtchi) – 38:31	2–0
	2–1	44:36 – J. Rodewald (J. Slafkovský, T. Steenbergen)
P. Puhakka (V. Savinainen, P. Virta) (ENG) – 58:41	3–1

4 min
Penalties
4 min
15
Shots
23

26 April 2022; 18:30	TPS	1–0 (0–0, 0–0, 1–0)	Tappara	Gatorade Center, Turku; Attendance: 10,251

Game reference
Andrei Kareyev	Goalies	Christian Heljanko	Referees: Joonas Kova; Petri Lindqvist; Linesmen: Niko Jusi; Joni Pekkala
E. Eronen (A. Intonen, M. Hults) – 53:17 / 1–0			Referees: Joonas Kova; Petri Lindqvist; Linesmen: Niko Jusi; Joni Pekkala
0 min	Penalties	6 min	Referees: Joonas Kova; Petri Lindqvist; Linesmen: Niko Jusi; Joni Pekkala
27	Shots	25	Referees: Joonas Kova; Petri Lindqvist; Linesmen: Niko Jusi; Joni Pekkala

28 April 2022; 18:30	Tappara	1–0 (1–0, 0–0, 0–0)	TPS	Nokia Arena, Tampere; Attendance: 12,451

Game reference
Christian Heljanko	Goalies	Andrei Kareyev	Referees: Mikko Kaukokari; Jukka-Pekka Koistinen; Linesmen: Lauri Nikulainen; Hannu Sormunen
J. Luoto – 00:35 / 1–0			Referees: Mikko Kaukokari; Jukka-Pekka Koistinen; Linesmen: Lauri Nikulainen; Hannu Sormunen
4 min	Penalties	20 min	Referees: Mikko Kaukokari; Jukka-Pekka Koistinen; Linesmen: Lauri Nikulainen; Hannu Sormunen
23	Shots	16	Referees: Mikko Kaukokari; Jukka-Pekka Koistinen; Linesmen: Lauri Nikulainen; Hannu Sormunen

Tappara wins the finals 4-1.

== Final rankings ==
Gold medal	Tappara
Silver medal	TPS
Bronze medal	Ilves
4	KooKoo
5	Jukurit
6	HIFK
7	Kärpät
8	Lukko
9	HPK
10	Pelicans
11	KalPa
12	Sport
13	JYP
14	SaiPa
15	Ässät
