= Joona Luoto =

Finnish ice hockey player (born 1997)

- Born: 26 September 1997 (age 28) Lempäälä, Finland
- Height: 191 cm (6 ft 3 in)
- Weight: 87 kg (192 lb; 13 st 10 lb)
- Position: Right wing
- Shoots: Left
- SHL team Former teams: HV71; Tappara; Winnipeg Jets; HIFK; Columbus Blue Jackets; SC Bern
- NHL draft: Undrafted
- Playing career: 2016–present

Joona Luoto (born 26 September 1997) is a Finnish professional ice hockey player. He is currently under contract with HV71 in the Swedish Hockey League (SHL).

== Playing career ==
Undrafted, he previously played professionally in the Liiga for Tappara. In his rookie season with Tappara, he helped the team claim the Liiga title, adding 1 goal in 10 post-season games.

In the following two seasons, Luoto established himself as a two-way forward and matched his offensive totals with 16 points in each campaign. On 15 June 2019, Luoto was signed to a three-year, two-way contract with the Winnipeg Jets, joining former junior teammate, Patrik Laine.

After competing in his first training camp with the Winnipeg Jets, on 1 October 2019, Luoto was reassigned to familiarise himself with the North American style to AHL affiliate, the Manitoba Moose to begin the 2019–20 season. On 7 November 2019, after recording 3 assists in 9 games with the Moose, Luoto received his first recall to NHL by the Jets. The following day Luoto made his NHL debut with the Jets on the fourth-line in a 4–1 victory over the Vancouver Canucks at Bell MTS Place.

Before entering the 2021–22 season, Luoto was placed on unconditional waivers and mutually released from the final year of his contract with the Winnipeg Jets on 14 September 2021. As a free agent he returned to his original club, Tappara of the Liiga, agreeing to a one-year contract for the remainder of the season on 8 October 2021. In the 2021–22 season, Luoto added 9 goals and 14 points through 27 regular season games with Tappara. In the post-season, Luoto elevated his game and recorded 8 goals and 17 points in just 14 games to lead Tappara to the Championship and was awarded the Jari Kurri Trophy as the playoffs' most Valuable player.

On 1 June 2022, Luoto as a free agent returned to the NHL in securing a one-year, two-way contract with the Columbus Blue Jackets.

After his contract with the Blue Jackets, Luoto was unable to gain NHL interest. On 12 September 2023, Luoto agreed to an initial trial contract with Swiss club, SC Bern of the NL, with the option of extending to the length of the 2023–24 season.

== International play ==
During the 2016–17 season, Luoto made his junior international debut playing for Team Finland at the World Junior Ice Hockey Championships tournament in Montreal. In the tournament, he played 6 games with 10+10=20 in scoring.

== Career statistics ==
=== Regular season and playoffs ===
| | | | Regular season | | | | | Playoffs |
| Season | Team | League | GP | G | A | Pts | PIM | GP | G | A | Pts | PIM |
|---|---|---|---|---|---|---|---|---|---|---|---|---|
| 2014–15 | Tappara | Jr. A | 17 | 5 | 4 | 9 | 10 | — | — | — | — | — |
| 2015–16 | Tappara | Jr. A | 36 | 20 | 15 | 35 | 26 | — | — | — | — | — |
| 2016–17 | Tappara | Jr. A | 4 | 2 | 4 | 6 | 2 | — | — | — | — | — |
| 2016–17 | Tappara | Liiga | 24 | 5 | 1 | 6 | 6 | 10 | 1 | 0 | 1 | 4 |
| 2016–17 | LeKi | Mestis | 24 | 5 | 3 | 8 | 65 | — | — | — | — | — |
| 2017–18 | Tappara | Liiga | 47 | 8 | 8 | 16 | 14 | 13 | 0 | 2 | 2 | 2 |
| 2018–19 | Tappara | Liiga | 58 | 8 | 8 | 16 | 32 | 11 | 2 | 2 | 4 | 0 |
| 2019–20 | Manitoba Moose | AHL | 18 | 0 | 4 | 4 | 13 | — | — | — | — | — |
| 2019–20 | Winnipeg Jets | NHL | 16 | 0 | 0 | 0 | 2 | — | — | — | — | — |
| 2020–21 | HIFK | Liiga | 19 | 5 | 4 | 9 | 2 | — | — | — | — | — |
| 2020–21 | Manitoba Moose | AHL | 11 | 2 | 2 | 4 | 9 | — | — | — | — | — |
| 2021–22 | Tappara | Liiga | 27 | 9 | 5 | 14 | 12 | 14 | 8 | 9 | 17 | 2 |
| 2022–23 | Cleveland Monsters | AHL | 45 | 14 | 11 | 25 | 10 | — | — | — | — | — |
| 2022–23 | Columbus Blue Jackets | NHL | 7 | 1 | 0 | 1 | 0 | — | — | — | — | — |
| 2023–24 | SC Bern | NL | 45 | 18 | 9 | 27 | 20 | 7 | 2 | 1 | 3 | 4 |
| 2024–25 | HV71 | SHL | 40 | 12 | 13 | 25 | 32 | — | — | — | — | — |
| Liiga totals | | | 175 | 35 | 26 | 61 | 66 | 48 | 11 | 13 | 24 | 8 |
| NHL totals | | | 23 | 1 | 0 | 1 | 2 | — | — | — | — | — |

=== International ===
| Year | Team | Event | Result | GP | G | A | Pts | PIM |
|---|---|---|---|---|---|---|---|---|
| 2017 | Finland | WJC | 9th | 6 | 1 | 1 | 2 | 2 |
| Junior totals | | | | 6 | 1 | 1 | 2 | 2 |

== Awards and honours ==
| Award | Year |
Liiga
| Kanada-malja (Tappara) | 2017, 2022 |
| Jari Kurri Trophy | 2022 |
