= Zack Hayes =

Canadian ice hockey player (born 1999)

- Born: April 24, 1999 (age 27) Calgary, Alberta, Canada
- Height: 6 ft 3 in (191 cm)
- Weight: 227 lb (103 kg; 16 st 3 lb)
- Position: Defenceman
- Shoots: Left
- AHL team Former teams: Rochester Americans; Vegas Golden Knights; Vaasan Sport
- NHL draft: Undrafted
- Playing career: 2021–present

Zachary Hayes (born April 24, 1999) is a Canadian professional ice hockey defenceman for the Rochester Americans of the American Hockey League (AHL). Originally undrafted by teams in the National Hockey League (NHL), Hayes has previously played for the Vegas Golden Knights.

== Early life ==
Hayes was born on April 24, 1999, in Calgary, Alberta, the oldest of four children. He played several sports as a child, including soccer, lacrosse, volleyball, and field hockey, but was the most passionate about ice hockey. Hayes spent his minor ice hockey career with the Calgary Northstars of the Alberta Midget Hockey League (AMHL). He appeared in 27 games for the Northstars during the 2015–16 season, recording one goal and 10 points over that span.

== Playing career ==
=== Junior ===
Selected in the ninth round (184th overall) of the 2014 Western Hockey League (WHL) bantam draft, Hayes' parents wanted him to explore other options, whereas he played two games for the Canmore Eagles of the Alberta Junior Hockey League (AJHL) before ultimately agreeing to a contract with Prince Albert. After recording 29 points through his first 144 WHL games, he was named an alternate captain for the Raiders in 2018–19. That season, Prince Albert won the Ed Chynoweth Cup for the first time in 34 years, advancing to the 2019 Memorial Cup as WHL champions prior to being eliminated in round-robin play by the Guelph Storm.

After being named as Raiders team captain the following season, he set career highs with seven goals and 16 assists in 60 games, as well as a team-leading +37 plus–minus. Collectively, Hayes finished his major junior career with 15 goals and 79 points across 272 total games.

=== Professional ===
On April 6, 2020, the Vegas Golden Knights of the National Hockey League (NHL) signed Hayes to a one-year contract with their American Hockey League (AHL) affiliate, the Henderson Silver Knights. On March 30, 2021, the Golden Knights signed him to a three-year, entry-level contract that would take effect for the 2021–22 NHL season. Hayes was promoted to Vegas on March 21, 2022, making his NHL debut for the Golden Knights' 3–0 shutout loss to the Minnesota Wild.

In the following 2022–23 season, Hayes was re-assigned to begin the campaign with the Silver Knights in the AHL. After registering 1 assist through 14 games, Hayes was traded by the Golden Knights to the Carolina Hurricanes in exchange for future considerations on November 30, 2022. He was assigned directly to the Hurricanes' AHL affiliate, the Chicago Wolves. In reporting to the Wolves, Hayes made 14 further appearances, collecting three points before being traded for the second time within the NHL season, dealt from the Hurricanes to the New Jersey Devils in exchange for forward Jack Dugan at the league's annual trade deadline. He would subsequently finish the season with the Devils' AHL affiliate, the Utica Comets.

At the conclusion of his contract with the Devils, Hayes opted to embark on a career abroad by agreeing to a one-year contract with Finnish-based, Vaasan Sport of Liiga, on September 19, 2023. He was brought in to strengthen the team's defence corps after an injury to Valtteri Hietanen. He returned to North America after just a single season overseas, signing a one-year AHL contract with the Laval Rocket, the top affiliate of the Montreal Canadiens, on July 22, 2024.

On July 2, 2025, Hayes agreed to a one-year contract with the Milwaukee Admirals for the 2025–26 season. As a depth defenseman, Hayes posted 2 points through 36 appearances.

Un-signed leading into the 2026–27 season, Hayes agreed to a PTO contract in the AHL with the Rochester Americans on September 30, 2026.

== Career statistics ==
| | | | Regular season | | | | | Playoffs |
| Season | Team | League | GP | G | A | Pts | PIM | GP | G | A | Pts | PIM |
|---|---|---|---|---|---|---|---|---|---|---|---|---|
| 2014–15 | Calgary Northstars | AMHL | 32 | 2 | 0 | 2 | 8 | 3 | 0 | 0 | 0 | 0 |
| 2015–16 | Calgary Northstars | AMHL | 33 | 2 | 11 | 13 | 34 | 7 | 0 | 3 | 3 | 8 |
| 2015–16 | Canmore Eagles | AJHL | 2 | 0 | 1 | 1 | 0 | — | — | — | — | — |
| 2015–16 | Prince Albert Raiders | WHL | 1 | 0 | 0 | 0 | 0 | — | — | — | — | — |
| 2016–17 | Prince Albert Raiders | WHL | 72 | 2 | 10 | 12 | 82 | — | — | — | — | — |
| 2017–18 | Prince Albert Raiders | WHL | 71 | 3 | 14 | 17 | 98 | 7 | 0 | 2 | 2 | 6 |
| 2018–19 | Prince Albert Raiders | WHL | 68 | 3 | 24 | 27 | 74 | 23 | 1 | 2 | 3 | 10 |
| 2019–20 | Prince Albert Raiders | WHL | 60 | 7 | 16 | 23 | 68 | — | — | — | — | — |
| 2020–21 | Henderson Silver Knights | AHL | 35 | 2 | 5 | 7 | 26 | 5 | 0 | 1 | 1 | 0 |
| 2021–22 | Henderson Silver Knights | AHL | 54 | 2 | 8 | 10 | 66 | 2 | 0 | 1 | 1 | 0 |
| 2021–22 | Vegas Golden Knights | NHL | 3 | 0 | 0 | 0 | 0 | — | — | — | — | — |
| 2022–23 | Henderson Silver Knights | AHL | 14 | 0 | 1 | 1 | 13 | — | — | — | — | — |
| 2022–23 | Chicago Wolves | AHL | 14 | 2 | 1 | 3 | 7 | — | — | — | — | — |
| 2022–23 | Utica Comets | AHL | 15 | 1 | 3 | 4 | 9 | 3 | 0 | 0 | 0 | 6 |
| 2023–24 | Vaasan Sport | Liiga | 53 | 1 | 8 | 9 | 119 | 2 | 0 | 0 | 0 | 2 |
| 2024–25 | Laval Rocket | AHL | 46 | 2 | 6 | 8 | 51 | 5 | 0 | 1 | 1 | 12 |
| 2025–26 | Milwaukee Admirals | AHL | 36 | 1 | 1 | 2 | 20 | — | — | — | — | — |
| NHL totals | | | 3 | 0 | 0 | 0 | 0 | — | — | — | — | — |

== Awards and honours ==
| Award | Year | Ref |
WHL
| Ed Chynoweth Cup champion | 2019 | |
