= Juuso Antonen =

Finnish ice hockey player

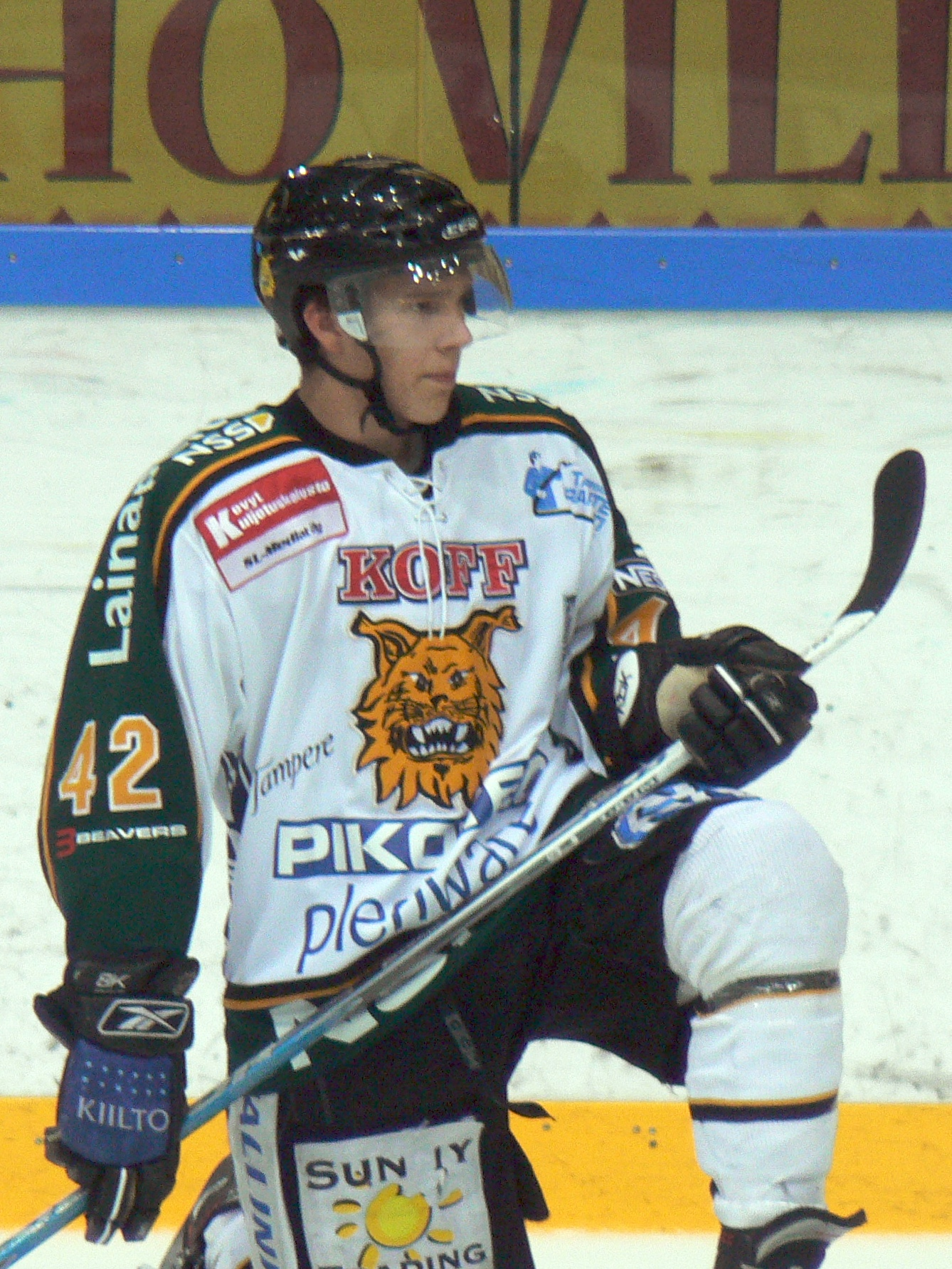
- Born: 8 February 1988 (age 38) Tampere, Finland
- Height: 182 cm (6 ft 0 in)
- Weight: 81 kg (179 lb; 12 st 11 lb)
- Position: Forward
- Shot: Left
- Played for: Ilves Tampere; LeKi Lempäälä; Tappara Tampere; Red Ducks Vaasa
- Playing career: 2006–2014
Medal record
Representing Finland
Ice hockey
IIHF World U18 Championships
Silver medal – second place	2006 Sweden

Juuso Antonen (born 8 February 1988) is a Finnish retired ice hockey player. He played in the Liiga with Ilves and Tappara.

His younger brother, Joose, is also a professional ice hockey player and currently plays with Ilves in the Liiga.
