= 2023–24 Liiga season =

Ice hockey season

2023–24 SM-liiga
- League: Liiga
- Sport: Ice hockey
- Defending champions: Tappara (2022–23)
- Duration: September 2023 – April 2024
- Games: 60
- Teams: 15
- TV partner(s): Telia; MTV Urheilu

Regular season
- Season champions: Tappara
- Runners-up: Ilves
- Season MVP: Jerry Turkulainen (JYP)
- Top scorer: Oula Palve (Ilves)

Playoffs
- Playoffs MVP: Christian Heljanko
- Finals champions: Tappara
- Runners-up: Pelicans

Liiga seasons
- ← 2022–23 2024–25 →

The 2023–24 Liiga season was the 49th season of the Liiga, the top level of ice hockey in Finland, since its formation in 1975.

== Format ==
The regular season started on Tuesday, 12 September 2023, with a match between Rauman Lukko and Hämeenlinnan Pallokerho in Rauma. The match was the only one of the day. As in previous seasons, 450 matches will be played in the regular season, 60 for each team. There are 25 full rounds of seven matches played, 16 of which are on Saturdays. A little more than half of the regular season, 262 matches, are played on Fridays and Saturdays. Most weekday games are played on Wednesdays (98). There were a total of 106 game days in the regular season, i.e. eight less than in the previous season.

As usual, the series is on break in November for a week and a half while the national teams play in the Euro Hockey Tour. The Christmas break lasts 5–7 days, depending on the team, with the exception of KalPa, which participates on the 26th–31st of December in the Spengler Cup in Switzerland. For other teams, the Christmas break ends on Saint Stephen's day, 26 December. The regular season ends on Tuesday, 12 March 2024.

== Teams ==
Location of teams in 2023–24 SM-liiga

| Team | City | Head coach | Arena | Capacity | Captain |
|---|---|---|---|---|---|
| HIFK | Helsinki | Ville Peltonen | Helsingin jäähalli | 8,200 | Jori Lehterä |
| HPK | Hämeenlinna | Maso Lehtonen | Pohjantähti Areena | 5,360 | Juuso Hietanen |
| Ilves | Tampere | Antti Pennanen | Nokia Arena | 12,700 | Niklas Friman |
| Jukurit | Mikkeli | Olli Jokinen | Ikioma Areena | 4,200 | Pekka Jormakka |
| JYP | Jyväskylä | ~~Jukka Rautakorpi~~ 20 Dec 2023; Mikko Heiskanen | LähiTapiola Areena | 4,437 | Teemu Eronen |
| KalPa | Kuopio | Petri Karjalainen | Olvi Areena | 5,300 | Tuomas Kiiskinen |
| KooKoo | Kouvola | Olli Salo | Lumon Areena | 5,950 | Otto Paajanen |
| Kärpät | Oulu | ~~Lauri Marjamäki~~ 18 Dec 2023; Ville Mäntymaa | Oulun Energia Areena | 6,300 | Atte Ohtamaa |
| Lukko | Rauma | Tomi Lämsä | Kivikylän Areena | 4,500 | Julius Mattila |
| Pelicans | Lahti | Tommi Niemelä | Isku Areena | 4,403 | Miika Roine |
| SaiPa | Lappeenranta | Ville Hämäläinen | Lappeenrannan jäähalli | 4,820 | Miska Siikonen |
| Sport | Vaasa | Risto Dufva | Vaasan Sähkö Areena | 5,185 | Sebastian Stålberg |
| Tappara | Tampere | Rikard Grönborg | Nokia Arena | 12,700 | Otto Rauhala |
| TPS | Turku | Tommi Miettinen | Gatorade Center | 10,500 | Juhani Jasu |
| Ässät | Pori | Jere Härkälä | Enersense Areena | 6,150 | Jesse Joensuu |

== Regular season standings ==
Top six advanced straight to the quarter-finals, while teams between 7th and 10th positions play a wild card round for the final two spots. The SM-liiga is a closed series and thus there is no relegation to the Mestis.

| Pos | Team | Pld | W | OTW | OTL | L | GF | GA | GD | Pts | Final Result |
|---|---|---|---|---|---|---|---|---|---|---|---|
| 1 | Tappara | 60 | 34 | 8 | 5 | 13 | 200 | 141 | +59 | 123 | Advance to Quarterfinals |
| 2 | Ilves | 60 | 33 | 7 | 7 | 13 | 197 | 144 | +53 | 120 | Advance to Quarterfinals |
| 3 | Pelicans | 60 | 31 | 4 | 8 | 17 | 177 | 147 | +30 | 109 | Advance to Quarterfinals |
| 4 | Kärpät | 60 | 28 | 8 | 6 | 18 | 174 | 147 | +27 | 106 | Advance to Quarterfinals |
| 5 | Jukurit | 60 | 30 | 3 | 7 | 20 | 197 | 147 | +50 | 103 | Advance to Quarterfinals |
| 6 | HIFK | 60 | 26 | 7 | 11 | 16 | 179 | 139 | +40 | 103 | Advance to Quarterfinals |
| 7 | KalPa | 60 | 25 | 6 | 7 | 22 | 169 | 156 | +13 | 94 | Advance to Wild-card round |
| 8 | Lukko | 60 | 22 | 10 | 6 | 22 | 157 | 160 | −3 | 92 | Advance to Wild-card round |
| 9 | TPS | 60 | 17 | 14 | 5 | 24 | 150 | 166 | −16 | 84 | Advance to Wild-card round |
| 10 | Sport | 60 | 21 | 5 | 10 | 24 | 155 | 174 | −19 | 83 | Advance to Wild-card round |
| 11 | Ässät | 60 | 19 | 7 | 10 | 24 | 136 | 144 | −8 | 81 | |
| 12 | KooKoo | 60 | 17 | 11 | 6 | 26 | 175 | 178 | −3 | 79 | |
| 13 | JYP | 60 | 16 | 7 | 7 | 30 | 152 | 196 | −44 | 69 | |
| 14 | HPK | 60 | 15 | 4 | 6 | 35 | 111 | 184 | −73 | 59 | |
| 15 | SaiPa | 60 | 5 | 10 | 10 | 35 | 125 | 231 | −106 | 45 | |

=== Statistics ===
==== Scoring leaders ====
The following shows the top ten players leading the league in points.

| Player | Team | GP | G | A | Pts | +/– | PIM |
|---|---|---|---|---|---|---|---|
| (Finland) Oula Palve | Ilves | 60 | 20 | 44 | 64 | +19 | 63 |
| (Finland) Jerry Turkulainen | JYP | 60 | 21 | 42 | 63 | +4 | 18 |
| (Finland) Eemeli Suomi | Ilves | 58 | 21 | 38 | 59 | +17 | 22 |
| (Finland) Teemu Turunen | Kärpät | 60 | 30 | 27 | 57 | +3 | 20 |
| (Finland) Anton Levtchi | Tappara | 55 | 19 | 38 | 57 | +11 | 22 |
| (Finland) Ville Koivunen | Kärpät | 59 | 22 | 34 | 56 | +7 | 26 |
| (Finland) Jori Lehterä | HIFK | 57 | 6 | 50 | 56 | +10 | 36 |
| (United States) Ryan Lasch | Pelicans | 55 | 9 | 45 | 54 | +14 | 14 |
| (Canada) Nathan Schnarr | Pelicans | 51 | 18 | 32 | 50 | +23 | 28 |
| (Canada) Ben Tardif | KooKoo | 57 | 15 | 35 | 50 | +10 | 74 |

== Playoffs ==
=== Bracket ===
Wild-card round (best-of-3)
7 | KalPa | 2
10 | Sport | 0
8 | Lukko | 1
9 | TPS | 2

Quarter-finals (best-of-7)
1 | Tappara | 4
9 | TPS | 2
2 | Ilves | 1
7 | KalPa | 4
3 | Pelicans | 4
6 | HIFK | 3
4 | Kärpät | 4
5 | Jukurit | 2

Semi-finals (best-of-7)
1 | Tappara | 4
7 | KalPa | 1
(Pairings are re-seeded after the first and second round)
3 | Pelicans | 4
4 | Kärpät | 1

Finals (best-of-7)
1 | Tappara | 4
3 | Pelicans | 1
Bronze medal game
4 | Kärpät | 3
7 | KalPa | 2

=== Wild-card round ===
KalPa – Sport 2-0
| 15.3.2024 | KalPa | Sport | 4-1 ref |
| 17.3.2024 | Sport | KalPa | 2-4 ref |
KalPa wins the series 2-0.

Lukko – TPS 1-2
| 15.3.2024 | Lukko | TPS | 3-2 OT1 ref |
| 16.3.2024 | TPS | Lukko | 2-1 ref |
| 18.3.2024 | Lukko | TPS | 3-5 ref |
TPS wins the series 2-1.

=== Quarter-finals ===
Tappara – TPS 4-2
| 20.3.2024 | Tappara | TPS | 4-1 ref |
| 22.3.2024 | TPS | Tappara | 4-2 ref |
| 23.3.2024 | Tappara | TPS | 4-0 ref |
| 26.3.2024 | TPS | Tappara | 2-1 OT1 ref |
| 28.3.2024 | Tappara | TPS | 5-2 ref |
| 30.3.2024 | TPS | Tappara | 4-5 OT1 ref |
Tappara wins the series 4-2.

Pelicans – HIFK 4-3
| 20.3.2024 | Pelicans | HIFK | 4-2 ref |
| 22.3.2024 | HIFK | Pelicans | 1-4 ref |
| 23.3.2024 | Pelicans | HIFK | 3-2 OT1 ref |
| 26.3.2024 | HIFK | Pelicans | 2-1 OT3 ref |
| 28.3.2024 | Pelicans | HIFK | 0-3 ref |
| 30.3.2024 | HIFK | Pelicans | 2-1 OT1 ref |
| 2.4.2024 | Pelicans | HIFK | 4-3 ref |
Pelicans wins the series 4-3.

Ilves – KalPa 1-4
| 21.3.2024 | Ilves | KalPa | 3-4 OT1 ref |
| 23.3.2024 | KalPa | Ilves | 1-0 OT1 ref |
| 25.3.2024 | Ilves | KalPa | 3-2 OT1 ref |
| 27.3.2024 | KalPa | Ilves | 4-2 ref |
| 29.3.2024 | Ilves | KalPa | 2-4 ref |
KalPa wins the series 4-1.

Kärpät – Jukurit 4-2
| 20.3.2024 | Kärpät | Jukurit | 4-1 ref |
| 22.3.2024 | Jukurit | Kärpät | 1-2 OT1 ref |
| 23.3.2024 | Kärpät | Jukurit | 5-2 ref |
| 26.3.2024 | Jukurit | Kärpät | 5-2 ref |
| 28.3.2024 | Kärpät | Jukurit | 2-3 ref |
| 30.3.2024 | Jukurit | Kärpät | 3-4 OT1 ref |
Kärpät wins the series 4-2.

=== Semi-finals ===
Tappara – KalPa 4-1
| 5.4.2024 | Tappara | KalPa | 3-2 OT1 ref |
| 6.4.2024 | KalPa | Tappara | 4-5 ref |
| 9.4.2024 | Tappara | KalPa | 1-2 ref |
| 12.4.2024 | KalPa | Tappara | 0-4 ref |
| 13.4.2024 | Tappara | KalPa | 3-1 ref |
Tappara wins the series 4-1.

Pelicans – Kärpät 4-1
| 5.4.2024 | Pelicans | Kärpät | 2-1 ref |
| 6.4.2024 | Kärpät | Pelicans | 3-5 ref |
| 9.4.2024 | Pelicans | Kärpät | 1-0 ref |
| 12.4.2024 | Kärpät | Pelicans | 1-0 ref |
| 13.4.2024 | Pelicans | Kärpät | 2-1 OT1 ref |
Pelicans wins the series 4-1.

=== Bronze medal game ===
| 19 April 2024; 18:30 | Kärpät | 3–2 OT1 (1–0, 0–2, 1–0, 1–0) | KalPa | Oulun Energia Areena, Oulu; Attendance: 4,528 |

Game reference

Tomi Karhunen
Goalies
Stefanos Lekkas
Referees:
Kristian Vikman
Riku Brander
Linesmen:
Luka Mäkinen
Juho-Pekka Inkinen

| Björkqvist (Antonen, Junttila) – 17:50 | 1–0 |
| | 1–1 | 28:19 – Simontaival (Elorinne, Räsänen) (DP) |
| | 1–2 | 28:44 – Räsänen (Simontaival, Gallet) |
| Berglund (Koivisto, Turunen) – 47:58 | 2–2 |
| Turunen (Koivunen, Koivisto) (PP1) – 71:08 | 3–2 |

4 min
Penalties
8 min
25
Shots
28

=== Finals ===
| 20 April 2024; 17:00 | Tappara | 3–1 (2–0, 0–0, 1–1) | Pelicans | Nokia Arena, Tampere; Attendance: 12,144 |

Game reference

Christian Heljanko
Goalies
Niklas Kokko
Referees:
Joonas Kova
Antti Boman
Linesmen:
Samuli Niskanen
Lauri Nikulainen

| Puhakka (Halloran, Keskinen) – 02:04 | 1–0 |
| Leskinen (Halloran, Keskinen) – 19:02 | 2–0 |
| Savinainen (Kontiola, Juolevi) – 49:29 | 3–0 |
| | 3–1 | 59:54 – Horký (Bryggman, Lasch) |

2 min
Penalties
8 min
25
Shots
24

| 22 April 2024; 18:30 | Pelicans | 2–3 (0–1, 1–2, 1–0) | Tappara | Isku Areena, Lahti; Attendance: 4,403 |

Game reference

Niklas Kokko
Goalies
Christian Heljanko
Referees:
Aleksi Rantala
Stefan Fonselius
Linesmen:
Hannu Sormunen
Joni Pekkala

| | 0–1 | 14:52 – Liedes (Rauhala, Ekberg) |
| | 0–2 | 28:02 – Savinainen (Camper, Kontiola) |
| | 0–3 | 34:21 – Tuulola (Savinainen, Granath) |
| Horký (Schnarr) – 37:53 | 1–3 |
| Utunen (Jordán, Lasch) – 55:23 | 2–3 |

6 min
Penalties
6 min
52
Shots
48

| 24 April 2024; 18:30 | Tappara | 1–2 OT2 (0–1, 1–0, 0–0, 0–0, 0–1) | Pelicans | Nokia Arena, Tampere; Attendance: 12,313 |

Game reference

Christian Heljanko
Goalies
Niklas Kokko
Referees:
Joonas Kova
Antti Boman
Linesmen:
Samuli Niskanen
Lauri Nikulainen

| | 0–1 | 16:47 – Horký |
| Rauhala (Vittasmäki) – 20:27 | 1–1 |
| | 1–2 | 84:40 – Carlsson (Lasch, Bryggman) |

6 min
Penalties
27 min
58
Shots
61

| 26 April 2024; 18:30 | Pelicans | 3–4 OT1 (2–0, 0–0, 1–3, 0–1) | Tappara | Isku Areena, Lahti; Attendance: 4,403 |

Game reference

Niklas Kokko
Goalies
Christian Heljanko
Referees:
Aleksi Rantala
Stefan Fonselius
Linesmen:
Hannu Sormunen
Joni Pekkala

| Haatanen (Král, Aaltonen) – 0:49 | 1–0 |
| Utunen (Král, Schnarr) – 15:26 | 2–0 |
| | 2–1 | 44:19 – Levtchi (Savinainen, Somppi) |
| | 2–2 | 50:35 – Levtchi (Tanus, Kontiola) (PP) |
| | 2–3 | 55:42 – Levtchi (Somppi, Savinainen) |
| Haatanen (Král, Horký) (PG-VR) – 59:20 | 3–3 |
| | 3–4 | 60:48 – Baptiste (Savinainen, Kemiläinen) |

6 min
Penalties
4 min
29
Shots
55

| 28 April 2024; 17:00 | Tappara | 3–0 (0–0, 1–0, 2–0) | Pelicans | Nokia Arena, Tampere; Attendance: 12,700 |

Game reference

Christian Heljanko
Goalies
Niklas Kokko
Referees:
Antti Boman
Joonas Kova
Linesmen:
Samuli Niskanen
Lauri Nikulainen

| Liedes (Rauhala, Baptiste) – 31:30 | 1–0 |
| Levtchi (Kontiola, Kemiläinen) (PP) – 41:29 | 2–0 |
| Granath (ENG - PP) – 58:13 | 3–0 |

4 min
Penalties
6 min
48
Shots
34

Tappara wins the finals 4-1.

== Final rankings ==
| Gold medal | Tappara |
| Silver medal | Pelicans |
| Bronze medal | Kärpät |
| 4 | KalPa |
| 5 | Ilves |
| 6 | Jukurit |
| 7 | HIFK |
| 8 | TPS |
| 9 | Lukko |
| 10 | Sport |
| 11 | Ässät |
| 12 | KooKoo |
| 13 | JYP |
| 14 | HPK |
| 15 | SaiPa |

== Broadcast rights ==
For the 2023–2024 season, Telia had transferred the television rights of the SM-liiga to MTV, which it owns. Telia had acquired the broadcast rights starting from the 2018–2019 season, and with the new agreement MTV has the rights until the end of the 2026–2027 season. MTV pays more than 90 million euros for television rights over four seasons, and the company has admitted that the operation is loss-making. The broadcasts are produced by MTV and during the season games can be seen live from C More, Discovery+, DNA, Elisa Viihde, MTV and Telia.

== Attendances ==
| # | Ice hockey club | Average attendance |
|---|---|---|
| 1 | Tappara | 8,494 |
| 2 | Ilves | 8,126 |
| 3 | IFK Helsingfors | 7,873 |
| 4 | HC TPS | 5,410 |
| 5 | Ässät | 4,657 |
| 6 | Kärpät | 4,633 |
| 7 | Lukko | 3,638 |
| 8 | Vaasan Sport | 3,619 |
| 9 | Lahti Pelicans | 3,548 |
| 10 | KooKoo | 3,434 |
| 11 | KalPa | 3,403 |
| 12 | JYP | 3,252 |
| 13 | HPK | 3,149 |
| 14 | Mikkelin Jukurit | 2,933 |
| 15 | SaiPa | 2,357 |
