= Otto Leskinen =

Finnish ice hockey player

- Born: 6 February 1997 (age 29) Pieksämäki, Finland
- Height: 5 ft 11 in (180 cm)
- Weight: 187 lb (85 kg; 13 st 5 lb)
- Position: Defence
- Shoots: Left
- SHL team Former teams: Luleå HF; KalPa; Montreal Canadiens; Jokerit; Tappara
- NHL draft: Undrafted
- Playing career: 2015–present

Otto Leskinen (born 6 February 1997) is a Finnish professional ice hockey player for Luleå HF of the Swedish Hockey League (SHL). Leskinen has previously played in the National Hockey League (NHL) as well as the Liiga and Kontinental Hockey League (KHL).

== Playing career ==
Leading up to the 2015 NHL entry draft, Leskinen was ranked 114th overall International Skaters by the NHL Central Scouting Bureau. While he went undrafted in North America, Leskinen signed a three-year contract extension with KalPa on 29 April 2015. He signed a two-year extension with KalPa on 21 November 2017.

In June 2018, Leskinen was invited to attend the Montreal Canadiens of the National Hockey League (NHL) training camp. In December 2018, Leskinen helped lead Kalpa to their first Spengler Cup Championship. He recorded one point during the tournament, an assist off captain Tommi Jokinen's goal in the semi-finals.

Leskinen had a breakout season in the final year of his contract. He recorded a career-high 31 points, 23 assists, and 8 goals in 57 games during the 2018–19 season. As a result, Leskinen signed a two-year, entry-level contract with the Montreal Canadiens in May 2019. He was invited to their annual development camp in June that year and competed in their pre-season games. He made his NHL debut in a 3–2 defeat against the Colorado Avalanche on 5 December 2019. After playing five games for the Canadiens, Leskinen returned to the Laval Rocket for the remainder of the season.

On 4 August 2020, Leskinen was returned by the Canadiens on loan to former club, KalPa of the Liiga, to begin the 2020–21 season due to the delayed North American season as a consequence of the COVID-19 pandemic.

As a free agent from the Canadiens organization, Leskinen was signed by Finnish outfit, Jokerit of the KHL, agreeing to a two-year contract on 15 June 2021. After splitting time between the foregoing and Tappara of Liiga, Leskinen returned to the Canadiens organization via a one-year, two-way contract signed on 14 June 2022.

Following the 2022–23 season within the Canadiens organization, Leskinen left the organization as a pending free agent and returned to his former club, Tappara of the Liiga, on a two-year contract on 10 May 2023.

After completing his two-year stint with Tappara in the Liiga, Leskinen as a free agent was signed to a two-year contract with Swedish champions, Luleå HF of the SHL, beginning from the 2025–26 season on 22 May 2025.

== International play ==
Leskinen competed with the U18 Team Finland squad at the 2015 IIHF World U18 Championships, where he won a silver medal.

Leskinen was selected to try out for Team Finland ahead of the 2017 World Junior Ice Hockey Championships, but failed to make the final cut. In February 2019, Leskinen was selected to compete for Team Finland in the Euro Hockey Tour. He was later invited to tryout for Team Finland's World Championship team.

== Player profile ==
“Leskinen’s biggest strength is his skating, playmaking, and his ability to join the offence as a defenceman.”

— KalPa skating coach Marko Tuomainen on the Canadiens signing Leskinen.

Described as a smooth-skating, offensive defenceman, Leskinen was praised for his ability to help on a power play.

== Personal life ==
He graduated from Vocational and Adult College of Savonia.

== Career statistics ==
=== Regular season and playoffs ===
			Regular season					Playoffs
Season	Team	League	GP	G	A	Pts	PIM	GP	G	A	Pts	PIM
2013–14	KalPa	Jr. A	2	0	0	0	0	—	—	—	—	—
2014–15	KalPa	Jr. A	44	5	21	26	40	—	—	—	—	—
2015–16	KalPa	Jr. A	28	6	25	31	39	9	2	4	6	6
2015–16	KalPa	Liiga	19	0	1	1	2	—	—	—	—	—
2016–17	KalPa	Liiga	50	2	8	10	10	14	1	0	1	2
2016–17	KalPa	Jr. A	2	0	2	2	2	3	1	1	2	0
2016–17	Iisalmen Peli-Karhut	Mestis	5	1	2	3	2	—	—	—	—	—
2017–18	KalPa	Liiga	52	1	12	13	20	6	0	1	1	0
2017–18	KalPa	Jr. A	—	—	—	—	—	4	0	5	5	0
2018–19	KalPa	Liiga	57	8	23	31	34	—	—	—	—	—
2019–20	Laval Rocket	AHL	52	2	20	22	57	—	—	—	—	—
2019–20	Montreal Canadiens	NHL	5	0	0	0	0	—	—	—	—	—
2020–21	KalPa	Liiga	17	4	6	10	10	—	—	—	—	—
2020–21	Laval Rocket	AHL	33	1	16	17	12	—	—	—	—	—
2020–21	Montreal Canadiens	NHL	1	0	0	0	0	—	—	—	—	—
2021–22	Jokerit	KHL	35	4	11	15	8	—	—	—	—	—
2021–22	Tappara	Liiga	10	4	4	8	2	15	4	6	10	0
2022–23	Laval Rocket	AHL	24	1	7	8	22	—	—	—	—	—
2023–24	Tappara	Liiga	50	6	26	32	22	16	1	3	4	2
2024–25	Tappara	Liiga	52	9	29	38	30	2	0	0	0	0
Liiga totals			307	34	109	143	130	53	6	10	16	4
NHL totals			6	0	0	0	0	—	—	—	—	—
KHL totals			35	4	11	15	8	—	—	—	—	—

=== International ===
Year	Team	Event	Result	GP	G	A	Pts	PIM
2015	Finland	U18	2nd place, silver medalist(s)	7	0	0	0	4
Junior totals				7	0	0	0	4

== Awards and honours ==
Award	Year
Liiga
Kanada-malja champion	2022
