= Victor Berglund =

Swedish ice hockey player

- Born: 2 August 1999 (age 26) Örnsköldsvik, Sweden
- Height: 185 cm (6 ft 1 in)
- Weight: 83 kg (183 lb; 13 st 1 lb)
- Position: Defence
- Shoots: Right
- Allsv team Former teams: MoDo Hockey; Luleå HF; Providence Bruins; HIFK; Oulun Kärpät
- NHL draft: 195th overall, 2017; Boston Bruins
- Playing career: 2016–present

Victor Berglund (born 2 August 1999) is a Swedish professional ice hockey defenceman who is currently playing under contract with MoDo Hockey in the HockeyAllsvenskan (Allsv). He was drafted 195th overall by the Boston Bruins in the seventh round of the 2017 NHL entry draft.

== Playing career ==
=== Europe ===
As a youth, Berglund played junior hockey for Modo Hockey junior team in the J20 SuperElit, winning a silver medal with the team in the 2017 Junior Club World Cup.

Berglund spent part of the 2016–17 season with Modo of the HockeyAllsvenskan, the second-tier Swedish ice hockey league, scoring one assist in 12 games. He continued to play 37 games for Modo in the 2017–18 season, making one goal and six assists and during the season, and was briefly loaned to Örnsköldsviks HF of the third-tier HockeyEttan for two games. For the 2018–19 season, Berglund played 50 games for Modo, with four goals and nine assists. He improved to 52 games played with ten goals and 12 assists for the 2019–20 season.

=== North America ===
The Boston Bruins drafted Berglund 195th overall in the seventh round in the 2017 NHL entry draft.

On 5 April 2019, he made his North American professional debut with Boston's AHL affiliate, the Providence Bruins in a 8–6 win against the Bridgeport Sound Tigers, scoring his first AHL goal. The Bruins signed him to a three-year entry-level contract on 15 June 2020.

For the 2020–21 season, the Bruins loaned Berglund to Luleå HF of the Swedish Hockey League, where he played 50 games with four goals and 17 assists. He returned to the Providence Bruins for the 2021–22 AHL season.

Returning to the Providence Bruins to begin the 2022–23 season, Berglund appeared in just 5 regular season games through three months before he was placed on unconditional waivers by the Boston Bruins in order for a mutual termination of his contract on 8 December 2022.

=== Return to Europe ===
On 10 December 2022, Berglund returned to Europe and secured a contract for the remainder of the season with Finnish club, HIFK of the Liiga.

At the conclusion of his short-term contract with HIFK, Berglund opted to continue in the Liiga, securing a two-year contract with Oulun Kärpät on 29 April 2023. In the midst of his final season under contract with Oulun in 2024–25, Berglund left following 17 appearances and returned to his original club, MoDo Hockey of the SHL, on an initial loan basis on 7 December 2024.

Integrating within the MoDo blueline successfully, Berglund was later signed to a permanent contract with MoDo and later agreed to a two-year contract extension through 2027 on 11 February 2025.

== Career statistics ==
			Regular season					Playoffs
Season	Team	League	GP	G	A	Pts	PIM	GP	G	A	Pts	PIM
2015–16	Modo Hockey	J20	2	1	0	1	0	—	—	—	—	—
2016–17	Modo Hockey	J20	37	5	10	15	16	6	0	0	0	0
2016–17	Modo Hockey	Allsv	12	0	1	1	4	—	—	—	—	—
2017–18	Modo Hockey	J20	23	10	8	18	30	6	2	1	3	16
2017–18	Modo Hockey	Allsv	37	1	6	7	10	—	—	—	—	—
2017–18	Örnsköldsviks HF	Div.1	2	0	0	0	2	—	—	—	—	—
2018–19	Modo Hockey	Allsv	50	4	9	13	20	4	0	0	0	0
2018–19	Modo Hockey	J20	1	0	0	0	0	3	1	2	3	2
2018–19	Providence Bruins	AHL	4	1	1	2	0	—	—	—	—	—
2019–20	Modo Hockey	Allsv	52	10	12	22	28	2	0	0	0	2
2020–21	Luleå HF	SHL	50	4	17	21	6	1	0	0	0	0
2021–22	Providence Bruins	AHL	46	6	12	18	30	1	0	0	0	0
2021–22	Maine Mariners	ECHL	3	1	3	4	0	—	—	—	—	—
2022–23	Providence Bruins	AHL	5	0	1	1	4	—	—	—	—	—
2022–23	HIFK	Liiga	29	2	18	20	6	10	0	4	4	4
2023–24	Oulun Kärpät	Liiga	53	6	11	17	18	12	1	1	2	6
2024–25	Oulun Kärpät	Liiga	17	0	4	4	6	—	—	—	—	—
2024–25	MoDo Hockey	SHL	28	6	3	9	12	—	—	—	—	—
SHL totals			78	10	20	30	18	1	0	0	0	0
Liiga totals			99	8	33	41	30	22	1	5	6	10
