= Andrei Kareyev =

Russian ice hockey player

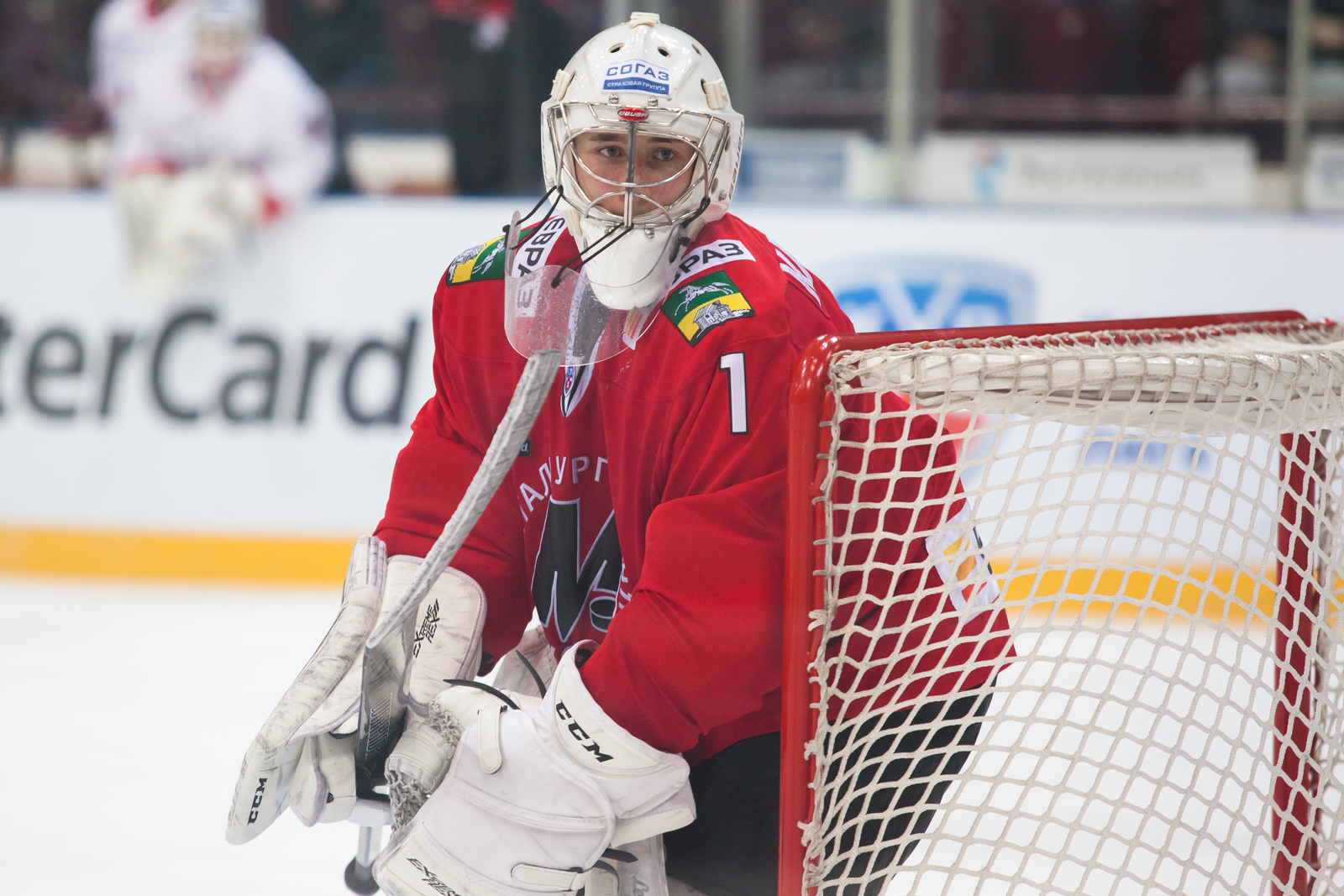
- Born: November 19, 1994 (age 31) Moscow, Russia
- Height: 6 ft 0 in (183 cm)
- Weight: 176 lb (80 kg; 12 st 8 lb)
- Position: Goaltender
- Catches: Left
- KHL team Former teams: Shanghai Dragons; Metallurg Novokuznetsk; Neftekhimik Nizhnekamsk; Salavat Yulaev Ufa; HC TPS; Spartak Moscow; Dinamo Minsk; HC Vityaz
- Playing career: 2013–present

Andrei Kareyev (born November 19, 1994) is a Russian professional ice hockey goaltender. He is currently playing with Shanghai Dragons in the Kontinental Hockey League (KHL).

== Playing career ==
Kareyev made his KHL debut playing with Metallurg Novokuznetsk during the 2014–15 KHL season.

Following two seasons in the Finnish Liiga with HC TPS, Kareyev returned to Russia and re-joined previous club, Salavat Yulaev Ufa of the KHL, on 3 June 2022.

Following a season with HC Spartak Moscow, Kareyev continued his journeyman career in joining Belarusian club, HC Dinamo Minsk, on a one-year deal on 17 May 2024.

On 16 August 2025, after a brief stint with HC Vityaz, Kareyev continued his career in the KHL, moving to newly rebranded Shanghai Dragons on a one-year contract for the 2025–26 season.
