= Anton Levtchi =

Finnish ice hockey player

- Born: 28 November 1995 (age 30) Varkaus, Finland
- Height: 183 cm (6 ft 0 in)
- Weight: 84 kg (185 lb; 13 st 3 lb)
- Position: Forward
- Shoots: Left
- SHL team Former teams: Luleå HF; Florida Panthers; Tappara Tampere
- NHL draft: Undrafted
- Playing career: 2016–present

Anton Levtchi (born 28 November 1995) is a Finnish professional ice hockey forward currently playing with Luleå HF in the Swedish Hockey League (SHL).

== Playing career ==
Levtchi made his professional debut playing with his original club, Tappara of Liiga during the 2016–17 season.

In his sixth year in the Liiga, Levtchi had a breakout 2021–22 season offensively, leading the Liiga in scoring in finishing tied first in goals with 26 and second in assists with 35 for 61 points through 55 regular season games. He helped lead Tappara to claim the Finnish Championship by claiming the Kanada-malja trophy. He was selected to the Liiga All-Star Team and finished with the Liiga Golden Helmet.

As an undrafted free agent, Levtchi agreed to pursue a career in North America, signing a one-year, entry-level contract with the Florida Panthers on 15 June 2022. By signing with the Panthers, Levtchi was reunited in joining former junior teammate and captain of the Panthers in Aleksander Barkov. After attending the Panthers' training camp in preparation for the 2022–23 season, Levtchi was reassigned to begin his transition to North America to American Hockey League (AHL) affiliate the Charlotte Checkers on 2 October 2022.

Levtchi registered 13 points through 24 games with the Checkers before he received his first recall to the NHL by the Panthers on 28 December 2022. He made his NHL debut on 29 December 2022, featuring in a depth forward role in a 7–2 victory over the Montreal Canadiens. Following his second appearance with the Panthers, Levtchi was returned to the AHL on 1 January 2023. Levtchi appeared in a further 11 games with the Checkers before opting to be placed on unconditional waivers by the Panthers to mutually terminate his contract on 31 January 2023.

On 1 February 2023, Levtchi returned to his native Finland, re-joining Tappara of the Liiga for the remainder of the season.

== Career statistics ==
			Regular season					Playoffs
Season	Team	League	GP	G	A	Pts	PIM	GP	G	A	Pts	PIM
2012–13	Tappara	Jr. A	7	0	1	1	4	—	—	—	—	—
2013–14	Tappara	Jr. A	37	8	17	25	10	2	1	1	2	0
2014–15	Tappara	Jr. A	47	17	25	42	46	—	—	—	—	—
2015–16	Tappara	Jr. A	41	18	31	49	54	3	0	4	4	0
2015–16	LeKi	Mestis	9	0	1	1	0	—	—	—	—	—
2016–17	Tappara	Liiga	13	0	0	0	0	—	—	—	—	—
2016–17	Tappara	Jr. A	3	0	5	5	0	—	—	—	—	—
2016–17	LeKi	Mestis	35	11	17	28	35	—	—	—	—	—
2017–18	Tappara	Liiga	17	0	1	1	4	—	—	—	—	—
2017–18	LeKi	Mestis	27	9	15	24	14	—	—	—	—	—
2018–19	Tappara	Liiga	59	4	19	23	18	11	2	1	3	18
2019–20	Tappara	Liiga	59	13	33	46	20	—	—	—	—	—
2020–21	Tappara	Liiga	49	16	29	45	20	9	1	2	3	16
2021–22	Tappara	Liiga	55	26	35	61	46	14	1	9	10	14
2022–23	Charlotte Checkers	AHL	35	8	9	17	6	—	—	—	—	—
2022–23	Florida Panthers	NHL	2	0	0	0	0	—	—	—	—	—
2022–23	Tappara	Liiga	16	6	7	13	31	13	4	8	12	2
2023–24	Tappara	Liiga	55	19	38	57	22	16	9	5	14	6
2024–25	Luleå HF	SHL	39	14	21	35	12	13	3	7	10	4
Liiga totals			323	84	162	246	161	63	17	25	42	56
NHL totals			2	0	0	0	0	—	—	—	—	—

== Awards and honours ==
Award	Year
Liiga
All-Star Team	2022, 2024
Aarne Honkavaara trophy	2022
Veli-Pekka Ketola trophy	2022
Golden Helmet	2022
Kanada-malja (Tappara)	2022, 2023, 2024
SHL
Le Mat Trophy (Luleå HF)	2025
