= Joose Antonen =

Finnish ice hockey player

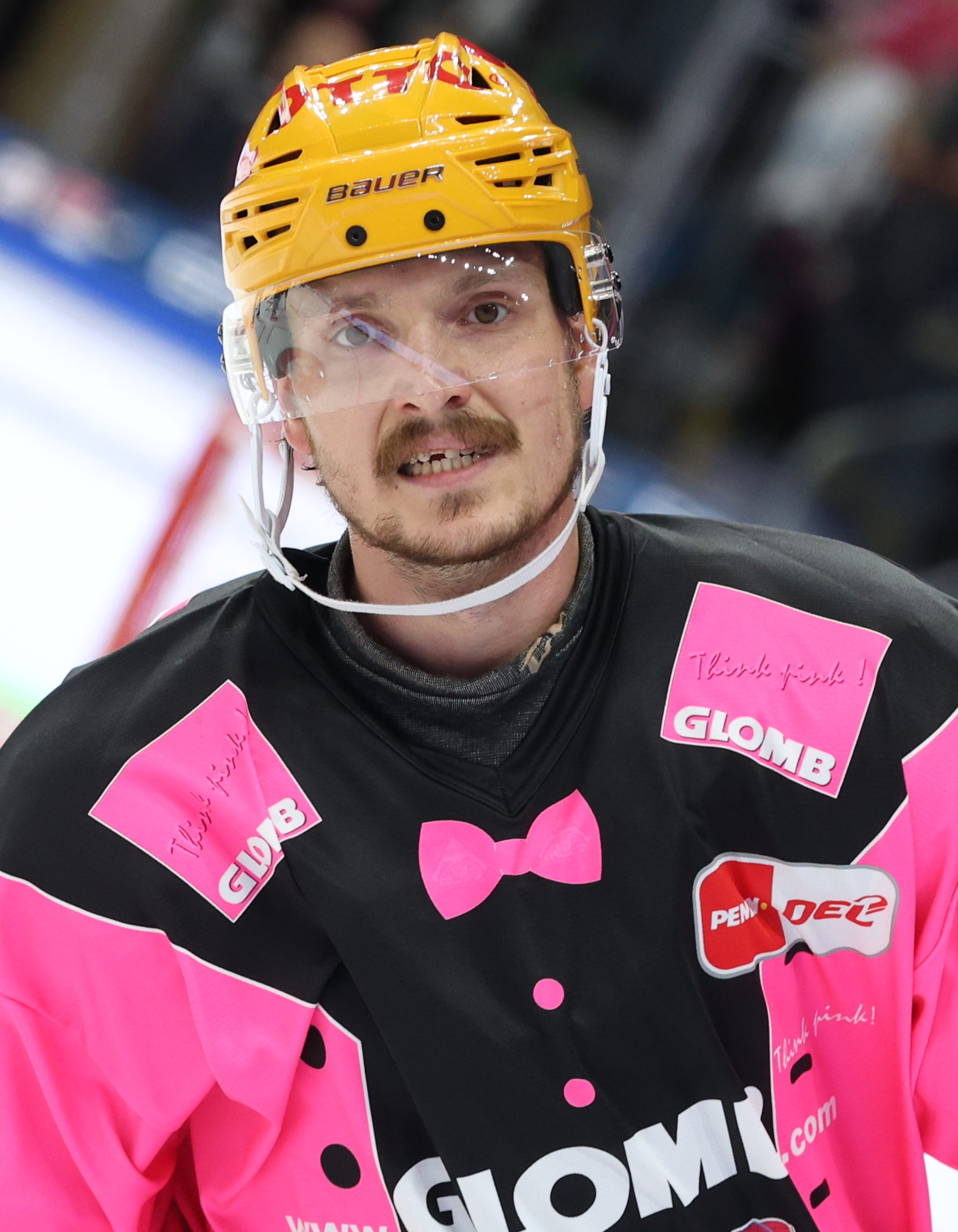
- Joose Antonen in 2024
- Born: 28 April 1995 (age 29); Tampere, Finland
- Height: 187 cm (6 ft 2 in)
- Weight: 84 kg (185 lb; 13 st 3 lb)
- Position: Forward
- Shoots: Right
- Liiga team Former teams: Kiekko-Espoo; JYP Jyväskylä; Lukko Rauma; Ilves; KooKoo; Oulun Kärpät; Tappara; Fischtown Pinguins; Södertälje SK
- Playing career: 2012–present

Joose Antonen (born 28 April 1995) is a Finnish professional ice hockey player who currently plays with Kiekko-Espoo of the Liiga.

Antonen made his Liiga debut playing with JYP Jyväskylä during the 2012-13 Liiga season.

His elder brother Juuso was also a professional ice hockey player, now retired.
