= 2025–26 Liiga season =

2025–26 SM-liiga
- League: Liiga
- Sport: Ice hockey
- Defending champions: KalPa (2024–25)
- Duration: September 2025 – May 2026
- Games: 60
- Teams: 16
- TV partner(s): Telia; MTV Urheilu; MTV Katsomo

Regular season
- Season champions: Tappara
- Runners-up: KooKoo
- Season MVP: Benjamin Rautiainen (Tappara)
- Top scorer: Benjamin Rautiainen (Tappara)

Playoffs
- Playoffs MVP: Joni Tuulola (Tappara)
- Finals champions: Tappara
- Runners-up: KooKoo

Liiga seasons
- ← 2024–25 2026–27 →

The 2025–26 Liiga season was the 51st season of the Liiga, the top level of Finnish ice hockey since 1975.

== Format ==
The regular season started in September 2025. As in previous seasons, 480 matches were played in the regular season, 60 for each team.

The top two teams in the regular season, excluding the Finnish champion, advanced to the Champions Hockey League, while the best team in the regular season team not qualified for Champions Hockey League advanced to the Spengler Cup.

== Teams ==
Location of teams in 2025–26 SM-liiga

Team	City	Head coach	Arena	Capacity	Captain
HIFK	Helsinki	Olli Jokinen	Helsingin jäähalli	8,200	Iiro Pakarinen
HPK	Hämeenlinna	Mikko Manner	Pohjantähti Areena	5,360	Petteri Nikkilä
Ilves	Tampere	Tommi Niemelä	Nokia Arena	12,700	Joonas Nättinen
Jukurit	Mikkeli	Jonne Virtanen	Ikioma Areena	4,200	Jesper Piitulainen
JYP	Jyväskylä	Petri Matikainen	LähiTapiola Areena	4,437	Jere Lassila
KalPa	Kuopio	Sami Tervonen	Olvi Areena	5,300	Jaakko Rissanen
Kiekko-Espoo	Espoo	Jyrki Aho	Espoo Metro Areena	6,982	Matti Järvinen
KooKoo	Kouvola	Jouko Myrrä	Lumon Areena	5,950	Otto Paajanen
Kärpät	Oulu	Petri Karjalainen	Oulun Energia Areena	6,300	Atte Ohtamaa
Lukko	Rauma	Tomi Lämsä	Kivikylän Areena	4,500	Éric Gélinas
Pelicans	Lahti	Sami Kapanen	Isku Areena	4,403	Casimir Jürgens
SaiPa	Lappeenranta	Raimo Helminen	Lappeenrannan jäähalli	4,820	Samuli Niinisaari
Sport	Vaasa	~~Juuso Hahl~~14 Oct 2025; ~~Doug Shedden~~10 Dec 2025; Jussi Tapio	Vaasan Sähkö Areena	5,185	Miika Koivisto
Tappara	Tampere	Rikard Grönborg	Nokia Arena	12,700	Otto Rauhala
TPS	Turku	Toni Söderholm	Gatorade Center	10,500	Tarmo Reunanen
Ässät	Pori	Jarno Pikkarainen	Enersense Areena	6,150	Jan-Mikael Järvinen

== Regular season standings ==
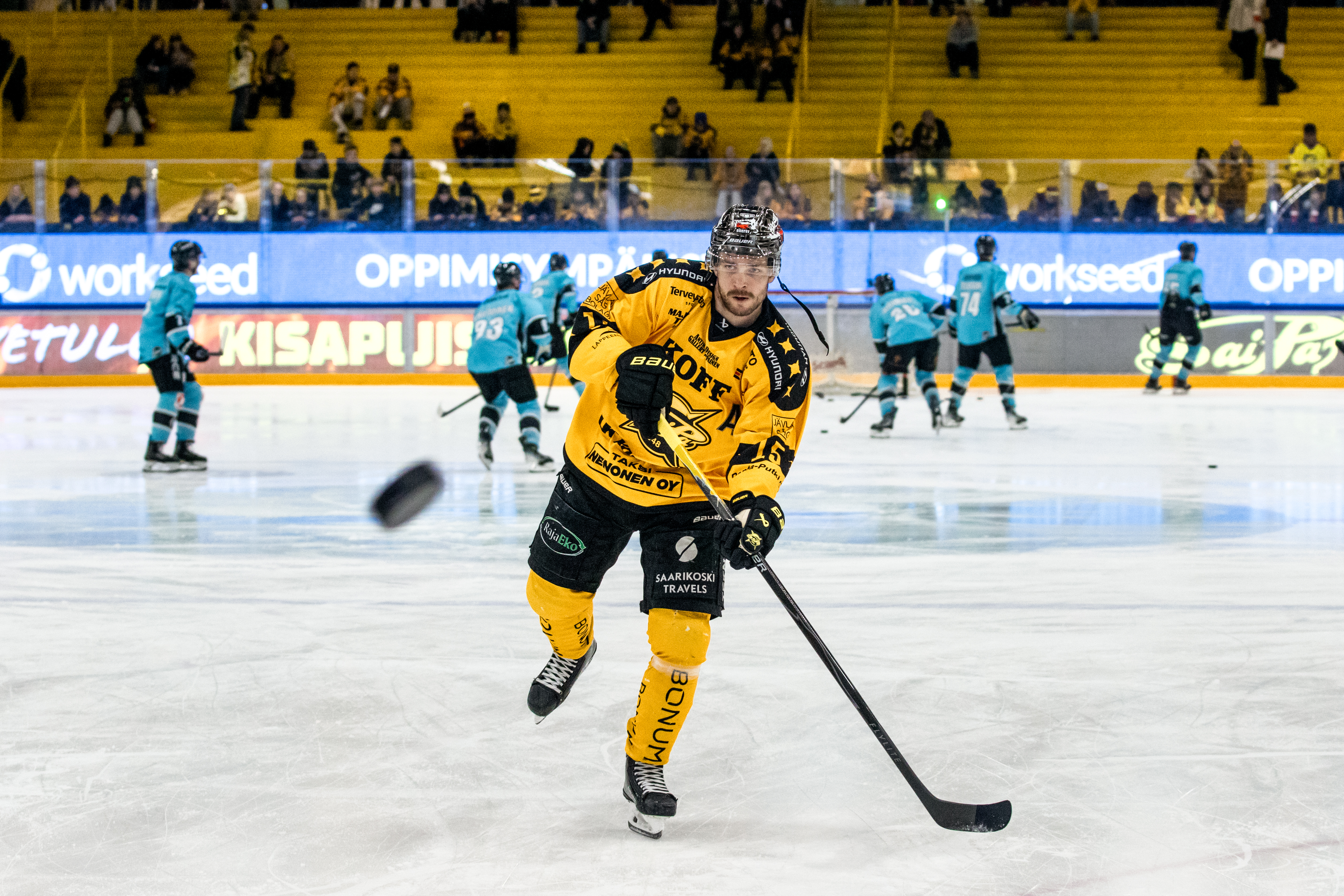
SaiPa - Pelicans in March 2026

Top four advance straight to the quarter-finals, while teams between 5th and 12th positions play a wild card round for the final four spots.

Pos	Team	Pld	W	OTW	OTL	L	GF	GA	GD	Pts	Final Result
1	Tappara (C)	60	35	3	6	16	226	149	+77	117	Qualification to Quarter-finals and Champions Hockey League (Note: SaiPa qualified due to regular-season championsTappara also winning Liiga play-off)
2	KooKoo	60	33	7	2	18	217	155	+62	115	Qualification to Quarter-finals and Champions Hockey League
3	SaiPa	60	31	6	7	16	204	162	+42	112	Qualification to Quarter-finals and Champions Hockey League
4	Ilves	60	29	8	4	19	186	152	+34	107	Advance to Quarterfinals
5	Lukko	60	28	9	4	19	185	157	+28	106	Advance to Wild-card round
6	JYP	60	26	11	6	17	202	180	+22	106	Advance to Wild-card round
7	KalPa	60	28	7	6	19	185	179	+6	104	Advance to Wild-card round
8	Ässät	60	26	6	4	24	170	165	+5	94	Advance to Wild-card round
9	Kiekko-Espoo	60	23	5	11	21	157	155	+2	90	Advance to Wild-card round
10	HIFK	60	25	4	5	26	149	183	−34	88	Advance to Wild-card round
11	Pelicans	60	20	9	7	24	137	156	−19	85	Advance to Wild-card round
12	HPK	60	16	9	9	26	144	167	−23	75	Advance to Wild-card round
13	TPS	60	16	7	9	28	141	177	−36	71	
14	Kärpät	60	16	6	6	32	175	197	−22	66	
15	Jukurit	60	15	6	7	32	131	171	−40	64	
16	Sport	60	9	1	11	39	108	212	−104	40	

(C) Champion

== Playoffs ==
=== Playoff bracket ===
First round (best-of-5)
5	Lukko	1
12	HPK	3
6	JYP	0
11	Pelicans	3
7	KalPa	3
10	HIFK	2
8	Ässät	3
9	Kiekko-Espoo	2

Quarter-finals (best-of-7)
1	Tappara	4
12	HPK	1
2	KooKoo	4
11	Pelicans	1
3	SaiPa	4
8	Ässät	3
4	Ilves	4
7	KalPa	2

Semi-finals (best-of-7)
1	Tappara	4
4	Ilves	2
(Pairings are re-seeded after the first and second round)
2	KooKoo	4
3	SaiPa	2

Finals (best-of-7)
1	Tappara	4
2	KooKoo	3
Bronze medal game
3	SaiPa	7
4	Ilves	2

=== First round ===
==== (5) Lukko vs. (12) HPK ====
20 March	Lukko	2–1	HPK	Äijänsuo Ice Hall	Recap
Antti Saarela (1) – 1:45		First period	2:42 – Sami Päivärinta (1)
No scoring		Second period	No scoring
Antti Saarela (2) – 3:25		Third period	No scoring
Joni Ortio (24 shots / 23 saves)		Goalie stats	Kim Saarinen (31 shots / 29 saves)

21 March	HPK	2–0	Lukko	Hämeenlinna Ice Hall	Recap
No scoring		First period	No scoring
Sami Päivärinta (2) – 18:13		Second period	No scoring
Cameron Wright (1; ENG) – 19:58		Third period	No scoring
Kim Saarinen (28 shots / 28 saves)		Goalie stats	Daniel Salonen (13 shots / 12 saves)

23 March	Lukko	1–3	HPK	Äijänsuo Ice Hall	Recap
No scoring		First period	No scoring
Topias Haapanen (1) – 5:13		Second period	No scoring
No scoring		Third period	3:12 – Cameron Wright (2); 6:55 – Jesse Kiiskinen (1); 19:15 – Kalle Kangas (1; ENG)
Joni Ortio (19 shots / 17 saves)		Goalie stats	Kim Saarinen (30 shots / 29 saves)

24 March	HPK	4–1	Lukko	Hämeenlinna Ice Hall	Recap
Cameron Wright (3) – 12:38		First period	No scoring
Sami Päivärinta (3; PPG) – 6:16; Thomas Caron (1) – 15:33		Second period	No scoring
Anrei Hakulinen (1; ENG) – 16:37		Third period	14:43 – Jakob Stenqvist (1; PPG)
Kim Saarinen (33 shots / 32 saves)		Goalie stats	Daniel Salonen (28 shots / 25 saves)

HPK win series 3–1

==== (6) JYP vs. (11) Pelicans ====
20 March	JYP	1–3	Pelicans	LähiTapiola-areena	Recap
No scoring		First period	15:22 – Eerik Kolehmainen (1)
Pekka Jormakka (1) – 5:03		Second period	8:11 – Oskars Batņa (1); 12:50 – Miro Väänänen (1; SHG)
No scoring		Third period	No scoring
Oskari Salminen (11 shots / 8 saves)		Goalie stats	Patrik Bartošák (28 shots / 27 saves)

21 March	Pelicans	3–2	JYP	Wemasto Areena	Recap
Roni Karvinen (1) – 8:09; Aidan Dudas (1) – 10:54		First period	14:02 – Juuso Puustinen (1; PPG)
No scoring		Second period	No scoring
Eerik Kolehmainen (2) – 4:24		Third period	0:55 – Mikko Perttu (1)
Patrik Bartošák (34 shots / 32 saves)		Goalie stats	Oskari Salminen (18 shots / 15 saves)

23 March	JYP	0–1	Pelicans	LähiTapiola-areena	Recap
No scoring		First period	12:27 – Niklas Virtanen (1)
No scoring		Second period	No scoring
No scoring		Third period	No scoring
Oskari Setänen (12 shots / 11 saves)		Goalie stats	Patrik Bartošák (29 shots / 29 saves)

Pelicans win series 3–0

==== (7) KalPa vs. (10) HIFK ====
20 March	KalPa	4–1	HIFK	Kuopio Ice Hall	Recap
Aleksis Klemetti (1) – 3:29; Aleksis Klemetti (2) – 10:39		First period	14:33 – Petrus Palmu (1)
Jaakko Lantta (1; SHG) – 18:05		Second period	No scoring
Patrick Curry (1) – 5:29		Third period	No scoring
Talyn Boyko (29 shots / 28 saves)		Goalie stats	Hugo Alnefelt (15 shots / 11 saves)

21 March	KalPa	1–4	HIFK	Kuopio Ice Hall	Recap
No scoring		First period	10:29 – Petteri Lindbohm (1)
Veikka Mononen (1) – 4:42		Second period	15:21 – Tony Sund (1)
No scoring		Third period	11:58 – Vincent Marleau (1); 18:11 – Vincent Marleu (2; ENG)
Talyn Boyko (28 shots / 25 saves)		Goalie stats	Hugo Alnefelt (22 shots / 21 saves)

23 March	HIFK	1–0	OT	KalPa	Helsinki Ice Hall	Recap
No scoring		First period		No scoring
No scoring		Second period		No scoring
No scoring		Third period		No scoring
Petr Kodÿtek (1) – 7:01		First overtime period		No scoring
Hugo Alnefelt (22 shots / 22 saves)		Goalie stats		Talyn Boyko (29 shots / 28 saves)

24 March	HIFK	1–4	KalPa	Helsinki Ice Hall	Recap
No scoring		First period	8:45 – Konsta Kapanen (1)
No scoring		Second period	17:18 – Joona Saarelainen (1)
Petr Kodÿtek (2; PPG) – 11:10		Third period	5:20 – Aleksi Klemetti (3); 19:19 – Andreas Okany (1; ENG)
Hugo Alnefelt (25 shots / 22 saves)		Goalie stats	Talyn Boyko (33 shots / 32 saves)

26 March	KalPa	3–2	OT	HIFK	Kuopio Ice Hall	Recap
No scoring		First period		6:09 – Oliver Larsen (1)
No scoring		Second period		No scoring
Patrick Curry (2; PPG) – 3:21; Filip Westerlund (1; PPG) – 5:11		Third period		18:21 – Petrus Palmu (2)
Juuso Könönen (1) – 9:17		First overtime period		No scoring
Talyn Boyko (19 shots / 17 saves)		Goalie stats		Hugo Alnefelt (28 shots / 25 saves)

KalPa win series 3–2

==== (8) Ässät vs. (9) Kiekko-Espoo ====
20 March	Ässät	4–3	OT	Kiekko-Espoo	Isomäki Ice Hall	Recap
Roope Talaja (1) – 2:45		First period		7:20 – Joonas Rask (1)
No scoring		Second period		0:31 – Janne Hämäläinen (1; PPG); 19:53 – Kasper Kulonummi (1; PPG)
Nestor Noiva (1) – 13:26; Jonne Tammela (1) – 17:57		Third period		No scoring
Oskar Nilsson (1) – 4:41		First overtime period		No scoring
Jan Bednář (21 shots / 18 saves)		Goalie stats		Petteri Rimpinen (34 shots / 30 saves)

21 March	Kiekko-Espoo	1–2	OT	Ässät	Espoo Metro Areena	Recap
Iikka Kangasniemi (1; PPG) – 11:41		First period		No scoring
No scoring		Second period		7:10 – Sakari Kostilainen (1; PPG)
No scoring		Third period		No scoring
No scoring		First overtime period		19:00 – Dylan Fabre (1)
Petteri Rimpinen (26 shots / 24 saves)		Goalie stats		Jan Bednář (45 shots / 44 saves)

23 March	Ässät	2–5	Kiekko-Espoo	Isomäki Ice Hall	Recap
No scoring		First period	No scoring
Nestor Noiva (1; PPG) – 11:04		Second period	10:14 – Santeri Virtanen (1); 17:23 – Kasper Kulonummi (2; PPG); 18:08 – Lukas Svejkovsky (1; PPG)
Feetu Knihti (1) – 13:11		Third period	10:59 – Iikka Kangasniemi (2); 19:17 – Ottoville Leppänen (1; ENG)
Jan Bednář (33 shots / 29 saves)		Goalie stats	Petteri Rimpinen (28 shots / 26 saves)

24 March	Kiekko-Espoo	4–1	Ässät	Espoo Metro Areena	Recap
No scoring		First period	1:25 – Jonne Tammela (2)
Cameron Hillis (1; PPG) – 9:59; Santeri Virtanen (2) – 15:35		Second period	No scoring
Cameron Hillis (2) – 9:24; Jere Väisänen (1; ENG) – 17:43		Third period	No scoring
Petteri Rimpinen (16 shots / 15 saves)		Goalie stats	Jan Bednář (28 shots / 25 saves)

26 March	Ässät	5–2	Kiekko-Espoo	Isomäki Ice Hall	Recap
Roope Talaja (2) – 2:19; Nestor Noiva (3) – 3:49; Patrik Juhola (1) – 7:09		First period	No scoring
Sakari Kostilainen (2) – 11:17		Second period	11:37 – Leo Komarov (1); 15:25 – Kristian Näkyvä (1)
Feetu Knihti (2; ENG) – 19:37		Third period	No scoring
Jan Bednář (25 shots / 23 saves)		Goalie stats	Petteri Rimpinen (12 shots / 16 saves)

Ässät win series 3–2

=== Quarter-finals ===
==== (1) Tappara vs. (12) HPK ====
28 March	Tappara	2–1	HPK	Nokia Arena	Recap
Henrik Haapala (1) – 7:55		First period	No scoring
Kasper Simontaival (1; PPG) – 19:53		Second period	15:55 – Elmeri Eronen (1)
No scoring		Third period	No scoring
Christian Heljanko (18 shots / 17 saves)		Goalie stats	Kim Saarinen (30 shots / 28 saves)

30 March	HPK	2–1	Tappara	Hämeenlinna Ice Hall	Recap
Sami Päivärinta (4; PPG) – 7:53		First period	No scoring
Olli Korhonen (1) – 1:13		Second period	No scoring
No scoring		Third period	8:09 – Jesper Mattila (1)
Kim Saarinen (30 shots / 29 saves)		Goalie stats	Christian Heljanko (28 shots / 26 saves)

2 April	Tappara	3–1	HPK	Nokia Arena	Recap
Olli Juolevi (1) – 3:31		First period	No scoring
Kristian Tanus (1) – 10:01		Second period	No scoring
Daniel Brickley (1) – 4:22		Third period	14:27 – Vili Toivonen (1)
Christian Heljanko (17 shots / 16 saves)		Goalie stats	Kim Saarinen (27 shots / 24 saves)

4 April	HPK	3–4	OT	Tappara	Hämeenlinna Ice Hall	Recap
Viljami Jokirinne (1; PPG)		First period		0:13 – Eetu Tuulola (1); 3:14 – Joachim Blichfeld (1; PPG); 19:20 – Joachim Blichfeld (2)
No scoring		Second period		No scoring
Sami Päivärinta (5) – 17:02; Olli Korhonen (2) – 18:06		Third period		No scoring
No scoring		First overtime period		10:27 – Jesper Mattila (2)
Kim Saarinen (24 shots / 20 saves)		Goalie stats		Christian Heljanko (28 shots / 25 saves)

7 April	Tappara	1–0	HPK	Nokia Arena	Recap
No scoring		First period	No scoring
Emil Sylvegård (1; DP) – 3:47		Second period	No scoring
No scoring		Third period	No scoring
Christian Heljanko (16 shots / 16 saves)		Goalie stats	Kim Saarinen (33 shots / 32 saves)

Tappara win series 4–1

==== (2) KooKoo vs. (11) Pelicans ====
28 March	KooKoo	0–1	OT	Pelicans	Lumon arena	Recap
No scoring		First period		No scoring
No scoring		Second period		No scoring
No scoring		Third period		No scoring
No scoring		First overtime period		12:57 – Johannes Johannesen (1)
Eetu Randelin (21 shots / 20 saves)		Goalie stats		Patrik Bartošák (28 shots / 28 saves)

30 March	Pelicans	0–5	KooKoo	Wemasto Areena	Recap
No scoring		First period	1:06 – Joonas Oden (1)
No scoring		Second period	1:06 – Vilmos Galló (1); 10:03 – Marcus Davidsson (1; PPG); 15:29 – Marcus Davidsson (2)
No scoring		Third period	17:01 – Veeti Miettinen (1; ENG)
Patrik Bartošák (34 shots / 30 saves)		Goalie stats	Eetu Randelin (20 shots / 20 saves)

2 April	KooKoo	4–1	Pelicans	Lumon arena	Recap
No scoring		First period	No scoring
Joseph Berger (1) – 13:13		Second period	0:50 – Roni Karvinen (2)
Ville Meskanen (1; PPG) – 5:43; Ville Meskanen (2) – 11:51; Robert Rooba (1; ENG) – 16:38		Third period	No scoring
Eetu Randelin (24 shots / 23 saves)		Goalie stats	Patrik Bartošák (21 shots / 18 saves)

4 April	Pelicans	1–5	KooKoo	Wemasto Areena	Recap
No scoring		First period	0:32 – Veeti Miettinen (2)
No scoring		Second period	10:11 – Vilmos Galló (2)
Onni Lind (1) – 8:35		Third period	1:54 – Ossi-Petteri Jaakola (1); 4:30 – Veeti Miettinen (3; PP2); 18:40 – Samuel Valkeejärvi (1; ENG)
Patrik Bartošák (29 shots / 25 saves)		Goalie stats	Eetu Randelin (24 shots / 23 saves)

7 April	KooKoo	4–1	Pelicans	Lumon arena	Recap
Jimi Suomi (1; PPG) – 6:12; Ville Puhakka (1) – 12:10		First period	No scoring
No scoring		Second period	No scoring
Marcus Davidsson (3) – 8:39; Joonas Oden (2; ENG) – 19:12		Third period	5:52 – Niklas Virtanen (2)
Eetu Randelin (20 shots / 19 saves)		Goalie stats	Patrik Bartošák (29 shots / 26 saves)

KooKoo win series 4–1

==== (3) SaiPa vs. (8) Ässät ====
28 March	SaiPa	2–3	4OT	Ässät	Kisapuisto	Recap
Juuso Heikkilä (1) – 12:25		First period		No scoring
Antti Kalapudas (1; PPG) – 10:47		Second period		7:07 – Sakari Kostilainen (3); 15:12 – Valtteri Lipiäinen (1)
No scoring		Third period		No scoring
No scoring		Fourth overtime period		4:23 – Sakari Kostilainen (4)
Tomi Karhunen (45 shots / 42 saves)		Goalie stats		Jan Bednář (65 shots / 63 saves)

31 March	Ässät	2–3	2OT	SaiPa	Isomäki Ice Hall	Recap
No scoring		First period		No scoring
Otso Ylitalo (1) – 2:39		Second period		9:04 – Otto Kivenmäki (1)
Feetu Knihti (3) – 16:16		Third period		11:45 – Saku Salminen (1)
No scoring		Second overtime period		15:39 – Karri Aho (1)
Jan Bednář (49 shots / 46 saves)		Goalie stats		Tomi Karhunen (34 shots / 32 saves)

3 April	SaiPa	4–1	Ässät	Kisapuisto	Recap
No scoring		First period	No scoring
Santeri Airola (1) – 2:11; Eero Klintrup (1; SHG) – 7:05		Second period	No scoring
Henri Nikkanen (1; PPG) – 3:42; Maxime Fortier (1; DP) – 10:51		Third period	17:20 – Valtteri Lipiäinen (2; PPG)
Tomi Karhunen (23 shots / 22 saves)		Goalie stats	Jan Bednář (24 shots / 20 saves)

6 April	Ässät	4–2	SaiPa	Isomäki Ice Hall	Recap
Peter Tiivola (1) – 12:40		First period	1:15 – Patrik Siikanen (1); 17:39 – Juuso Heikkilä (2)
No scoring		Second period	No scoring
Sakari Kostilainen (5) – 0:58; Arttu Alasiurua (1) – 9:15; Roope Talaja (3) – 14:48		Third period	No scoring
Jan Bednář (26 shots / 24 saves)		Goalie stats	Tomi Karhunen (27 5shots / 23 saves)

8 April	SaiPa	1–5	Ässät	Kisapuisto	Recap
No scoring		First period	6:00 – Roope Talaja (4)
Brian Kramer (1) – 7:28		Second period	3:30 – Roope Talaja (5); 9:58 – Peter Tiivola (2); 15:18 – Patrik Juhola (2)
No scoring		Third period	12:11 – Jan-Mikael Järvinen (1)
Tomi Karhunen (20 shots / 16 saves); Kari Piiroinen (6 shots / 5 saves)		Goalie stats	Jan Bednář (25 shots / 24 saves)

11 April	Ässät	1–3	SaiPa	Isomäki Ice Hall	Recap
Roope Talaja (6) – 6:19		First period	2:00 – Santeri Airola (2; PPG)
No scoring		Second period	No scoring
No scoring		Third period	18:19 – Otto Kivenmäki (2); 19:26 – Janne Naukkarinen (1; ENG)
Jan Bednář (14 shots / 12 saves)		Goalie stats	Kari Piiroinen (22 shots / 21 saves)

13 April	SaiPa	4–2	Ässät	Kisapuisto	Recap
Brian Kramer (2) – 8:24; Henri Nikkanen (2; PPG) – 9:55; Henri Nikkanen (3; PPG) – 15:10		First period	No scoring
No scoring		Second period	8:24 – Roope Talaja (7)
Henri Nikkanen (4; PPG) – 7:38		Third period	8:37 – Jan-Mikael Järvinen (2)
Kari Piiroinen (22 shots / 20 saves)		Goalie stats	Jan Bednář (15 shots / 11 saves)

SaiPa win series 4–3

==== (4) Ilves vs. (7) KalPa ====
29 March	Ilves	3–1	KalPa	Nokia Arena	Recap
Erik Borg (1) – 9:55; Peter Quenneville (1) – 10:32		First period	No scoring
No scoring		Second period	10:44 – Konsta Kapanen (2)
Matias Mäntykivi (1; ENG) – 18:54		Third period	No scoring
Matas Armalis (21 shots / 20 saves)		Goalie stats	Talyn Boyko (21 shots / 19 saves)

31 March	KalPa	3–4	OT	Ilves	Kuopio Ice Hall	Recap
Jaakko Rissanen (1; PPG) – 17:35		First period		No scoring
Filip Westerlund (2) – 2:14		Second period		11:13 – Carl Klingberg (1); 15:57 – Matic Török (1; PPG)
Cade Borchardt (1) – 1:51		Third period		9:45 – Jens Lööke (1)
No scoring		First overtime period		2:35 – Simon Johansson (1)
Talyn Boyko (33 shots / 29 saves)		Goalie stats		Matas Armalis (20 shots / 17 saves)

3 April	Ilves	3–4	KalPa	Nokia Arena	Recap
No scoring		First period	No scoring
Radek Kucerik (1) – 10:56		Second period	9:32 – Lasse Lappalainen (1); 16:08 – Jaakko Lantta (2)
Jens Lööke (2) – 0:46; Luke Henman (1) – 18:42		Third period	13:57 – Andreas Okany (2; PPG); 18:01 – Jaakko Rissanen (2; ENG
Matas Armalis (23 shots / 20 saves)		Goalie stats	Talyn Boyko (35 shots / 32 saves); Patrik Kerkola (2 shots / 2 saves)

6 April	KalPa	5–3	Ilves	Kuopio Ice Hall	Recap
No scoring		First period	No scoring
Cade Borchardt (2) – 13:45; Cade Borchardt (3; PPG) – 16:15		Second period	18:58 – Jens Lööke (3)
Cade Borchardt (4) – 2:05; Cade Borchardt (5; PS) – 10:05; Konsta Kapanen (3) – 10:22		Third period	14:33 – Jens Lööke (4); 15:14 – Jens Lööke (5)
Talyn Boyko (41 shots / 38 saves)		Goalie stats	Matas Armalis (19 shots / 14 saves)

8 April	Ilves	2–1	OT	KalPa	Nokia Arena	Recap
No scoring		First period		No scoring
No scoring		Second period		3:54 – Teemu Hartikainen (1)
Radek Kučeřík (2) – 19:27		Third period		No scoring
Lukáš Jašek (1; SHG) – 18:54		First overtime period		No scoring
Dominik Pavlát (27 shots / 26 saves)		Goalie stats		Talyn Boyko (52 shots / 50 saves)

11 April	KalPa	3–4	Ilves	Kuopio Ice Hall	Recap
Joona Saarelainen (2) – 19:19		First period	12:48 – Radek Kučeřík (3)
Andreas Okany (3) – 4:09		Second period	8:44 – Kasper Björkqvist (1); 11:23 – Matias Mäntykivi (2; PPG); 13:25 – Matic Török (1)
Teemu Hartikainen (2; PP2) – 19:57		Third period	No scoring
Talyn Boyko (28 shots / 24 saves)		Goalie stats	Dominik Pavlát (29 shots / 26 saves)

Ilves win series 4–2

=== Semi-finals ===
==== (1) Tappara vs. (4) Ilves ====
16 April	Tappara	2–3	Ilves	Nokia Arena	Recap
No scoring		First period	2:17 – Peter Quenneville (2); 2:31 – Samuli Ratinen (1)
No scoring		Second period	No scoring
Joni Tuulola (1) – 4:11; Joni Tuulola (2) – 9:01		Third period	1:23 – Jens Lööke (6)
Christian Heljanko (22 shots / 19 saves)		Goalie stats	Mantas Armalis (26 shots / 24 saves)

19 April	Ilves	6–0	Tappara	Nokia Arena	Recap
Luke Henman (2; PPG) – 17:00		First period	No scoring
Samuli Ratinen (2) – 1:42; Matic Török (2; DP) – 11:23; Samuli Ratinen (3; DP) – 16:18		Second period	No scoring
Simon Johansson (2) – 9:11; Matic Török (3; PPG) – 12:44		Third period	No scoring
Dominik Pavlát (17 shots / 17 saves)		Goalie stats	Christian Heljanko (36 shots / 30 saves); Juha Metsola (3 shots / 3 saves)

21 April	Tappara	3–2	Ilves	Nokia Arena	Recap
Joachim Blichfeld (3; PPG) – 8:10; Benjamin Rautiainen (1; PPG) – 10:48		First period	No scoring
No scoring		Second period	1:23 – Matic Török (4); 14:34 – Carl Klingberg (2)
Kasper Simontaival (2; PPG) – 15:06		Third period	No scoring
Christian Heljanko (21 shots / 19 saves)		Goalie stats	Dominik Pavlát (22 shots / 19 saves)

23 April	Ilves	1–5	Tappara	Nokia Arena	Recap
No scoring		First period	2:30 – Joachim Blichfeld (4); 8:13 – Kasper Simontaival (3); 17:28 – Aapeli Räsänen (1)
No scoring		Second period	No scoring
Jens Lööke (7) – 7:41		Third period	2:46 – Joni Tuulola (3); 15:12 – Oiva Keskinen (1; ENG)
Mantas Armalis (26 shots / 22 saves)		Goalie stats	Christian Heljanko (27 shots / 26 saves)

25 April	Tappara	2–1	OT	Ilves	Nokia Arena	Recap
No scoring		First period		No scoring
No scoring		Second period		No scoring
Henrik Haapala (2) – 8:42		Third period		18:23 – Simon Johansson (3; SHG)
Kristian Tanus (2) – 6:00		First overtime period		No scoring
Christian Heljanko (21 shots / 20 saves)		Goalie stats		Dominik Pavlát (24 shots / 22 saves)

27 April	Ilves	3–4	Tappara	Nokia Arena	Recap
Lukáš Jašek (2) – 1:43; Teemu Engberg (1) – 5:02; Luke Henman (3) – 11:26		First period	No scoring
No scoring		Second period	4:49 – Kristian Tanus (3; PPG); 8:03 – Kasper Simontaival (4); 9:55 – Jyrki Jokipakka (1)
No scoring		Third period	3:54 – Daniel Brickley (2)
Dominik Pavlát (20 shots / 16 saves)		Goalie stats	Christian Heljanko (31 shots / 28 saves)

Tappara win series 4–2

==== (2) KooKoo vs. (3) SaiPa ====
17 April	KooKoo	4–2	SaiPa	Lumon arena	Recap
No scoring		First period	12:05 – Otto Kivenmäki (3); 14:52 – Juuso Heikkilä (3)
Veeti Miettinen (4) – 7:35		Second period	No scoring
Veeti Miettinen (5) – 6:25; Miska Siikonen (1) – 9:25; Miska Siikonen (2) – 15:53		Third period	No scoring
Eetu Randelin (17 shots / 15 saves)		Goalie stats	Kari Piiroinen (32 shots / 28 saves)

18 April	SaiPa	3–5	KooKoo	Kisapuisto	Recap
No scoring		First period	5:05 – Jimi Suomi (2); 7:19 – Veeti Miettinen (6)
Santeri Airola (3; PP2) – 6:32		Second period	1:52 – Ville Meskanen (3; PPG); 17:52 – Jimi Suomi (3)
Antti Kalapudas (2) – 4:44; Miikka Salomäki (1) – 17:59		Third period	19:30 – Vilmos Galló (3; ENG)
Tomi Karhunen (15 shots / 11 saves)		Goalie stats	Eetu Randelin (35 shots / 32 saves)

21 April	KooKoo	2–4	SaiPa	Lumon arena	Recap
No scoring		First period	8:24 – Miikka Salomäki (2); 15:41 – Santeri Airola (4); 19:18 – Patrik Siikanen (2; PPG)
Oskari Luoto (1; PPG) – 12:06		Second period	3:00 – Henri Nikkanen (5)
Otto Paajanen (1) – 18:51		Third period	No scoring
Eetu Randelin (13 shots / 10 saves); Juha Jatkola (14 shots / 13 saves)		Goalie stats	Kari Piiroinen (35 shots / 33 saves)

24 April	SaiPa	3–0	KooKoo	Kisapuisto	Recap
No scoring		First period	No scoring
0:29 – Patrik Siikanen (3; PPG); 16:09 – Samu Bau (1)		Second period	No scoring
17:48 – Henri Nikkanen (6; ENG)		Third period	No scoring
Kari Piiroinen (22 shots / 22 saves)		Goalie stats	Eetu Randelin (23 shots / 21 saves)

25 April	KooKoo	4–0	SaiPa	Lumon arena	Recap
Miska Siikonen (3) – 6:52		First period	No scoring
No scoring		Second period	No scoring
Jiri Pärssinen (1; PPG) – 5:08; Ossi-Petteri Jaakola (2) – 13:42; Robert Rooba (2; ENG) – 18:47		Third period	No scoring
Eetu Randelin (27 shots / 27 saves)		Goalie stats	Kari Piiroinen (32 shots / 29 saves)

27 April	SaiPa	2–3	OT	KooKoo	Kisapuisto	Recap
Niklas Appelgren (1) – 5:00		First period		13:52 – Miska Siikonen (4)
Maxime Fortier (2; PPG) – 18:53		Second period		14:29 – Veeti Miettinen (7)
No scoring		Third period		4:56 – Oskari Luoto (2)
Kari Piiroinen (30 shots / 27 saves)		Goalie stats		Eetu Randelin (23 shots / 21 saves)

KooKoo win series 4–2

=== Bronze medal game ===
30 April	SaiPa	7–2	Ilves	Kisapuisto	Recap
Emil Kuusla (1) – 1:09		First period	8:57 – Jarkko Parikka (1)
Henri Nikkanen (7) – 11:05; Samu Bau (2) – 14:00; Emil Kuusla (2) – 16:39		Second period	No scoring
Antti Kalapusas (3) – 6:03; Niklas Appelgren (2) – 8:42; Miro Tauslahti (1) – 14:34		Third period	2:12 – Matic Török (5; PPG)
Kari Piiroinen (21 shots / 19 saves)		Goalie stats	Dominik Pavlat (13 shots / 9 saves); Mantas Armalis (11 shots / 8 saves)

SaiPa win the bronze

=== Finals ===
2 May	Tappara	2–4	KooKoo	Nokia Arena	Recap
Justin Addamo (1) – 14:08		First period	14:45 – Vilmos Galló (4; DP)
No scoring		Second period	10:09 – Jimi Suomi (4); 13:29 – Marcus Davidsson (4)
Justin Addamo (2) – 14:40		Third period	18:09 – Otto Paajanen (2; ENG)
Christian Heljanko (32 shots / 29 saves)		Goalie stats	Eetu Randelin (22 shots / 20 saves)

4 May	KooKoo	3–2	Tappara	Lumon arena	Recap
Robert Rooba (3; PPG) – 12:05		First period	No scoring
Veeti Miettinen (8) – 8:15		Second period	2:50 – Kasper Simontaival (5); 17:50 – Kristian Tanus (4; DP)
Ville Meskanen (5) – 6:50		Third period	No scoring
Eetu Randelin (33 shots / 31 saves)		Goalie stats	Christian Heljanko (23 shots / 20 saves)

6 May	Tappara	2–0	KooKoo	Nokia Arena	Recap
Oiva Keskinen (2; DP) – 16:08		First period	No scoring
No scoring		Second period	No scoring
Jyrki Jokipakka (2; ENG) – 17:23		Third period	No scoring
Christian Heljanko (26 shots / 26 saves)		Goalie stats	Eetu Randelin (12 shots / 11 saves)

8 May	KooKoo	2–3	4OT	Tappara	Lumon arena	Recap
Manu Mäkelä (1) – 16:31		First period		8:08 – Joni Tuulola (4); 13:13 – Joachim Blichfeld (5)
Joonas Oden (3; DP)		Second period		No scoring
No scoring		Third period		No scoring
No scoring		Fourth overtime period		9:54 – Oiva Keskinen (3)
Eetu Randelin (52 shots / 49 saves)		Goalie stats		Christian Heljanko (59 shots / 57 saves)

9 May	Tappara	1–2	KooKoo	Nokia Arena	Recap
No scoring		First period	No scoring
Joachim Blichfeld (6; PPG) – 2:14		Second period	11:01 – Kim Nousiainen (1); 14:24 – Miska Siikonen (4)
No scoring		Third period	No scoring
Christian Heljanko (26 shots / 24 saves)		Goalie stats	Eetu Randelin (31 shots / 30 saves)

11 May	KooKoo	1–2	Tappara	Lumon arena	Recap
Ville Puhakka (2) – 15:35		First period	No scoring
No scoring		Second period	2:50 – Joachim Blichfeld (7); 11:25 – Aapeli Räsänen (2)
No scoring		Third period	No scoring
Eetu Randelin (13 shots / 11 saves)		Goalie stats	Christian Heljanko (32 shots / 31 saves)

13 May	Tappara	2–1	KooKoo	Nokia Arena	Recap
Ondřej Pavel (1) – 3:54; Joachim Blichfeld (8) – 18:31		First period	No scoring
No scoring		Second period	18:33 – Miska Siikonen (5; PP2)
		Third period
Christian Heljanko (25 shots / 24 saves)		Goalie stats	Eetu Randelin (31 shots / 29 saves)

Tappara win series 4–3

== Final rankings ==
Gold medal	Tappara
Silver medal	KooKoo
Bronze medal	SaiPa
4	Ilves
5	KalPa
6	Ässät
7	Pelicans
8	HPK
9	Lukko
10	JYP
11	Kiekko-Espoo
12	HIFK
13	TPS
14	Kärpät
15	Jukurit
16	Sport

== Liiga awards ==
Award	Winner(s)
Lasse Oksanen trophy	Benjamin Rautiainen (Tappara)
Jari Kurri Trophy	Joni Tuulola (Tappara)
Kultainen kypärä	Benjamin Rautiainen (Tappara)
Veli-Pekka Ketola trophy	Benjamin Rautiainen (Tappara)
Aarne Honkavaara trophy	Valtteri Ojantakanen (JYP)
Urpo Ylönen trophy	Eetu Randelin (KooKoo)
Pekka Rautakallio trophy	Simon Johansson (Ilves)
Jarmo Wasama Memorial Trophy	Emil Kuusla (SaiPa)
Raimo Kilpiö trophy	Jan-Mikael Järvinen (Ässät)
Matti Keinonen trophy	Aleksi Matinmikko (Tappara)
Aaro Kivilinna Memorial Trophy	Kiekko-Espoo
Kalevi Numminen trophy	Jouko Myrrä (KooKoo)
