= 2026–27 Liiga season =

2026–27 SM-liiga
- League: Liiga
- Sport: Ice hockey
- Defending champions: Tappara (2025–26)
- Duration: September 2026 – April 2027
- Games: 64
- Teams: 17
- TV partner(s): Telia; MTV Urheilu; MTV Katsomo

Regular season

Playoffs

Liiga seasons
- ← 2025–26

The 2026–27 Liiga season will be the 52nd season of the Liiga, the top level of Finnish ice hockey since 1975. This is the first season since the 2013–14 Liiga season that Jokerit play in the Liiga.

== Format ==
This season is a transition season towards a new league format. At the end of the season the 3 lowest ranked teams will join the top 7 teams from Mestis to create a new B-Liiga. The remaining 14 teams will create an A-Liiga as the new top flight league of Finnish ice hockey. The regular season starts in September 2026. Since there are now 17 teams each team will play 64 games in the regular season.

== Teams ==
Location of teams in 2026–27 SM-liiga

Team	City	Head coach	Arena	Capacity	Captain
HIFK	Helsinki	~~Olli Jokinen~~27 Sep 2026; Tommi Miettinen	Helsingin jäähalli	8,200	Iiro Pakarinen
HPK	Hämeenlinna	Mikko Manner	Pohjantähti Areena	5,360	Anrei Hakulinen
Ilves	Tampere	Tommi Niemelä	Nokia Arena	12,700	Jan-Mikael Järvinen
Jokerit	Helsinki	~~Tomek Valtonen~~27 Sep 2026; Juuso Hahl	Veikkaus Arena	13,349	Markus Hännikäinen
Jukurit	Mikkeli	Jonne Virtanen	Ikioma Areena	4,200	Connor Ford
JYP	Jyväskylä	Petri Matikainen	LähiTapiola Areena	4,437	Jere Lassila
KalPa	Kuopio	Sami Tervonen	Olvi Areena	5,300	Jaakko Rissanen
Kiekko-Espoo	Espoo	Jyrki Aho	Espoo Metro Areena	6,982	Jere Sallinen
KooKoo	Kouvola	~~Jouko Myrrä~~07 Oct 2026; Kai Suikkanen	Lumon Areena	5,250	Miska Siikonen
Kärpät	Oulu	Petri Karjalainen	Oulun Energia Areena	6,000	Eemil Erholtz
Lukko	Rauma	Tomi Lämsä	Kivikylän Areena	4,500	Heikki Liedes
Pelicans	Lahti	Sami Kapanen	Wemasto Areena	4,403	Michal Jordán
SaiPa	Lappeenranta	Raimo Helminen	Lappeenrannan jäähalli	4,820	Samuli Niinisaari
Sport	Vaasa	Lauri Mikkola	Vaasan Sähkö Areena	5,185	Miika Koivisto
Tappara	Tampere	~~Kari Jalonen~~19 Oct 2026; Fredrik Norrena	Nokia Arena	12,700	Otto Rauhala
TPS	Turku	Toni Söderholm	Gatorade Center	10,500	Niklas Friman
Ässät	Pori	Jarno Pikkarainen	Enersense Areena	6,000	Peter Tiivola

== Regular season standings ==
Top four advance straight to the quarter-finals, while teams between 5th and 12th positions play a wild card round for the final four spots. The 15th, 16th and 17th placed teams are relegated to the B-liiga for 2027–28 season.

Pos	Team	Pld	W	OTW	OTL	L	GF	GA	GD	Pts	Final Result
1	Lukko	23	15	3	1	4	73	45	+28	52	Qualification to Quarter-finals and Champions Hockey League
2	Ilves	25	14	3	1	7	73	49	+24	49	Qualification to Quarter-finals and Champions Hockey League
3	JYP	22	13	3	2	4	76	57	+19	47	Advance to Quarterfinals
4	Jukurit	25	11	4	2	8	63	52	+11	43	Advance to Quarterfinals
5	Ässät	25	12	1	2	10	58	64	−6	40	Advance to Wild-card round
6	SaiPa	21	11	3	1	6	64	46	+18	40	Advance to Wild-card round
7	Kärpät	25	9	4	5	7	72	73	−1	40	Advance to Wild-card round
8	TPS	24	11	2	2	9	68	67	+1	39	Advance to Wild-card round
9	Kiekko-Espoo	24	10	2	3	9	76	61	+15	37	Advance to Wild-card round
10	HIFK	23	8	3	4	8	64	66	−2	34	Advance to Wild-card round
11	HPK	24	8	3	0	13	52	65	−13	30	Advance to Wild-card round
12	Sport	23	7	3	3	10	47	63	−16	30	Advance to Wild-card round
13	Tappara	23	7	2	4	10	57	63	−6	29	
14	Pelicans	23	8	1	2	12	53	59	−6	28	
15	KalPa	23	8	0	3	12	55	62	−7	27	Relegated to B-Liiga for 2027–28 season
16	Jokerit	24	5	2	4	13	58	78	−20	23	Relegated to B-Liiga for 2027–28 season
17	KooKoo	23	2	2	2	17	53	92	−39	12	Relegated to B-Liiga for 2027–28 season

Updated to match(es) played on 21 November 2026. Source: Liiga
