= Sakari Kostilainen =

Finnish ice hockey player (born 2006)

- Born: December 2, 2006 (age 19) Helsinki, Finland
- Height: 180 cm (5 ft 11 in)
- Weight: 82 kg (181 lb; 12 st 13 lb)
- Position: Left wing
- Shoots: Left
- Liiga team: HC Ässät Pori
- Playing career: 2025–present

Sakari Kostilainen is a Finnish ice hockey player who represents HC Ässät of the Finnish Liiga. He plays as a left winger.

== Career ==
Kostilainen's youth club is Jokerit Helsinki. He won the 2021–22 U16 Finnish Championship and the 2023–24 U18 Finnish Championship with the club. For the 2024–2025 season, Kostilainen moved to the HC Ässät U20 team. He was the team's top goal scorer with 19 goals and the second-best point scorer with 36 points.

In April 2025, Kostilainen signed a two-year professional Liiga contract with the HC Ässät. During the 2025–26 preseason, he got media attention in his first games with the senior team by sticking his tongue out at Tappara's bench and antagonizing opponents in the final match of the Tampere Cup. Kostilainen began his season with the U20 team. He made his Liiga debut in the seventh round of the regular season on 27 September 2025 against JYP. Kostilainen was assigned to the left wing of the Ässät fourth line alongside Patrik Juhola and Feetu Knihti. He scored the first goal of his Liiga career in a Satakunnan derby away match against rivals Lukko on 24 January 2026. Kostilainen finished the regular season with 10 points in 32 games, scoring seven goals in his last eight regular season games before the playoffs. On 28 March 2026 Kostilainen scored the winning goal against SaiPa in the third longest Liiga game in history, 124 minutes and 23 seconds.

== Playing style ==
Kostilainen is known as an agitator and physical player despite his smaller size. He has been compared to Brad Marchand, from whom he also gets his jersey number 63.

== Personal life ==
In his youth Kostilainen played football, floorball and wrestling. His older brother also played ice hockey with him in Jokerit's juniors.

== Career statistics ==
=== Regular season and playoffs ===
			Regular season					Playoffs
Season	Team	League	GP	G	A	Pts	PIM	GP	G	A	Pts	PIM
2023–24	Jokerit	U20 SM-sarja	10	3	2	5	6	—	—	—	—	—
2024–25	Ässät	U20 SM-sarja	44	19	17	36	38	2	1	1	2	4
U20 SM-sarja totals			54	22	19	41	44	2	1	1	2	4
