= Tapio =

Tapio may refer to:

- Tapio (given name), a Finnish male given name
- Tapio (surname), a Finnish surname
- Tapio (spirit), a god or spirit in Eastern Finnish mythology
- Tapiola, one of the major urban centres within the city of Espoo, outside of Helsinki
- Tapiola, Michigan, an unincorporated community in Houghton County, Michigan, United States
- Tapiola, a symphonic poem by Jean Sibelius that was one of his last compositions
- Tápió, the name of a stream in Hungary. See Hydrography of Hungary

== See also ==
- Tapiola (disambiguation)
