= Henri Nikkanen =

Finnish ice hockey player (born 2001)

- Born: April 28, 2001 (age 25) Mikkeli, Finland
- Height: 6 ft 2 in (188 cm)
- Weight: 185 lb (84 kg; 13 st 3 lb)
- Position: Centre
- Shoots: Left
- Liiga team Former teams: Jokerit; Jukurit; Lahti Pelicans; SaiPa
- NHL draft: 113th overall, 2019; Winnipeg Jets
- Playing career: 2018–present

Henri Nikkanen (born April 28, 2001) is a Finnish ice hockey centre who currently plays for Jokerit in Finland's Liiga. He was formerly a prospect within the Winnipeg Jets organization of the National Hockey League (NHL).

== Playing career ==
Nikkanen began his professional career in Finland's top-tier league, the Liiga, playing for his hometown club, Mikkelin Jukurit, during the 2018–19 Liiga season. As a young prospect, he appeared in nine regular-season games for Jukurit, where he showcased his potential by scoring two goals. His performance and long-term potential drew the attention of NHL scouts, and in the 2019 NHL entry draft, the Winnipeg Jets selected him 113th overall in the fourth round.

On April 15, 2021, Nikkanen departed Jukurit and agreed to a two-year deal with the Lahti Pelicans, another team in the Liiga. During the 2021–22 season, he played in 60 games for the Pelicans, recording 7 goals and a total of 12 points.

On April 10, 2022, Nikkanen signed a three-year entry-level contract with the Winnipeg Jets. Following the agreement, Nikkanen joined the Jets' American Hockey League (AHL) affiliate, the Manitoba Moose, for the remainder of the 2021–22 season.

On December 12, 2024, after tallying four points in 13 games with the Manitoba Moose during the 2024–25 season, Nikkanen was placed on waivers by the Winnipeg Jets to terminate his contract. The next day, he returned to Finland and signed a two-year deal with SaiPa of the Finnish Liiga.

After two seasons with SaiPa, Nikkanen was signed to a two-year contract to continue in the Liiga with Jokerit on 18 May 2026.

== Career statistics ==
=== Regular season and playoffs ===
			Regular season					Playoffs
Season	Team	League	GP	G	A	Pts	PIM	GP	G	A	Pts	PIM
2016–17	JYP Jyväskylä	Jr. A	13	3	8	11	2	3	1	0	1	0
2017–18	JYP Jyväskylä	Jr. A	50	20	18	38	10	4	0	2	2	0
2018–19	Jukurit	Jr. A	14	2	7	9	18	—	—	—	—	—
2018–19	Jukurit	Liiga	9	2	0	2	0	—	—	—	—	—
2018–19	Ketterä	Mestis	2	1	0	1	0	—	—	—	—	—
2019–20	Jukurit	Jr. A	28	13	15	28	2	3	4	0	4	0
2019–20	Jukurit	Liiga	27	0	3	3	8	—	—	—	—	—
2020–21	Jukurit	Liiga	47	7	13	20	12	—	—	—	—	—
2021–22	Lahti Pelicans	Liiga	60	7	5	12	8	3	0	0	0	0
2021–22	Manitoba Moose	AHL	4	0	0	0	2	1	0	0	0	0
2022–23	Manitoba Moose	AHL	66	5	11	16	24	5	0	0	0	0
2023–24	Manitoba Moose	AHL	57	7	5	12	16	2	0	0	0	0
2024–25	Manitoba Moose	AHL	13	1	3	4	0	—	—	—	—	—
2024–25	SaiPa	Liiga	27	1	8	9	60	21	2	2	4	31
2025–26	SaiPa	Liiga	60	27	29	56	42	14	7	4	11	8
Liiga totals			230	44	58	102	130	38	9	6	15	39

Medal record

Ice hockey

Representing Finland

World Junior Championships
Bronze medal – third place	2021 Canada	

=== International ===
Year	Team	Event	Result	GP	G	A	Pts	PIM
2017	Finland	U17	6th	5	3	2	5	0
2018	Finland	HG18	7th	4	2	4	6	4
2021	Finland	WJC	3rd place, bronze medalist(s)	7	2	1	3	0
Junior totals				16	7	7	14	4
