= Otto Kivenmäki =

Finnish ice hockey player (born 2000)

- Born: 24 March 2000 (age 26) Pori, Finland
- Height: 5 ft 8 in (173 cm)
- Weight: 137 lb (62 kg; 9 st 11 lb)
- Position: Forward
- Shoots: Left
- SHL team Former teams: Timrå IK; Ässät; Lahti Pelicans; SaiPa
- NHL draft: 191st overall, 2018; Detroit Red Wings
- Playing career: 2018–present

Otto Kivenmäki (born 24 March 2000) is a Finnish professional ice hockey player for Timrå IK of the Swedish Hockey League (SHL). He was drafted 191st overall by the Detroit Red Wings in the 2018 NHL entry draft.

== Playing career ==
On 19 April 2018, Kivenmäki signed a three-year contract with Ässät of the Finnish SM-liiga. and made his professional debut for Ässät on 30 September 2018.

On 15 April 2021, Kivenmäki joined his second Liiga club, Lahti Pelicans, signing a two-year contract.

After two seasons with SaiPa, Kivenmäki left the Liiga following eight seasons to sign a two-year contract in the neighbouring Swedish League with Timrå IK on 8 May 2026.

== Personal life ==
Kivenmäki is the son of former professional ice hockey player Marko Kivenmäki.

== Career statistics ==
			Regular season					Playoffs
Season	Team	League	GP	G	A	Pts	PIM	GP	G	A	Pts	PIM
2016–17	Ässät	Jr. A	29	3	6	9	35	7	1	1	2	2
2017–18	Ässät	Jr. A	37	11	26	37	10	2	0	0	0	2
2018–19	Ässät	Jr. A	23	11	24	35	2	—	—	—	—	—
2018–19	Ässät	Liiga	34	2	14	16	8	—	—	—	—	—
2019–20	Ässät	Liiga	53	5	16	21	6	—	—	—	—	—
2020–21	Ässät	Liiga	29	6	12	18	18	—	—	—	—	—
2021–22	Lahti Pelicans	Liiga	59	5	15	20	6	3	0	1	1	0
2022–23	Lahti Pelicans	Liiga	50	11	13	24	14	2	0	0	0	0
2023–24	SaiPa	Liiga	58	6	22	28	20	—	—	—	—	—
2024–25	SaiPa	Liiga	59	16	34	50	12	21	3	13	16	6
2025–26	SaiPa	Liiga	60	11	46	57	18	14	3	8	11	4
Liiga totals			403	62	172	234	102	40	6	22	28	10
