= Feetu Knihti =

Finnish ice hockey player (born 2003)

- Born: 16 March 2003 (age 22) Kiukainen, Finland
- Height: 180 cm (5 ft 11 in)
- Weight: 80 kg (176 lb; 12 st 8 lb)
- Position: Centre
- Liiga team: Porin Ässät
- NHL draft: Eligible, 2022
- Playing career: 2021–present

Feetu Knihti (born 16 March 2003) is a Finnish ice hockey player who currently plays for Porin Ässät in Liiga. He made his Liiga debut on 17 September 2021 in a game against HPK.

== Career ==
In September 2021, Feetu Knihti signed a three-year contract with Ässät along with Kalle Myllymaa and Eemeli Virtanen.

Knihti made his Liiga debut on 17 September in a game against HPK.
