= Tapio (surname) =

Tapio is a Finnish surname. Notable people with the surname include:

- Juha Tapio (born 1974), Finnish singer, lyricist, composer and guitarist
- Jussi Tapio (born 1986), Finnish ice hockey player
- Kari Tapio (1945–2010), Finnish singer
- Neal Tapio (born 1970), American businessman
- Nina Tapio (born 1972), Finnish singer, songwriter, musical actor, and session musician
