= Eemeli Virtanen =

Finnish hockey player

- Born: September 4, 2002 (age 24) Pori, Finland
- Height: 177 cm (5 ft 10 in)
- Weight: 75 kg (165 lb; 11 st 11 lb)
- Position: Defence
- Shoots: Left
- Mestis team Former teams: RoKi; Porin Ässät

Eemeli Virtanen (born 4 September 2002) is a Finnish ice hockey defenceman who plays for RoKi in the Mestis, the second division of Finland.

In the 2021–22 season Virtanen played his first professional game for Porin Ässät in the Liiga on the 8th of October 2021 against SaiPa. Before that he had played in the U20 team.

== Career ==
Virtanen started his hockey career in Ässät. In the 2017–18 season he had the most goals for a defenceman in his team.

Before the start of the 2021–22 season Virtanen signed a 2+1 type of contract with Ässät. Virtanen ended his season in an injury. After the end of the 2022–23 season, Ässät announced that it will not use the additional year in Virtanen's contract and released Virtanen as a free agent for the 2023–24 season.

== Personal life ==
Virtanen's grandfather Anto Virtanen played as a forward in the SM-sarja for Porin Karhut and Ässät in a total of 315 matches in 1961–1975. He won two Finnish championships. Eemel's uncle Jaakko Virtanen played as a forward in Ässät, he played 167 Liiga matches in 1983–1989. He is now a member of the club's board. Eemeli's cousin and Jaakko's son Jami Virtanen played as a forward as Eemeli's teammate in Ässät.

Virtanen graduated from the Porin Suomalainen Yhteislyseon Lukio in 2021.
