= Joachim Blichfeld =

Danish ice hockey player (born 1998)

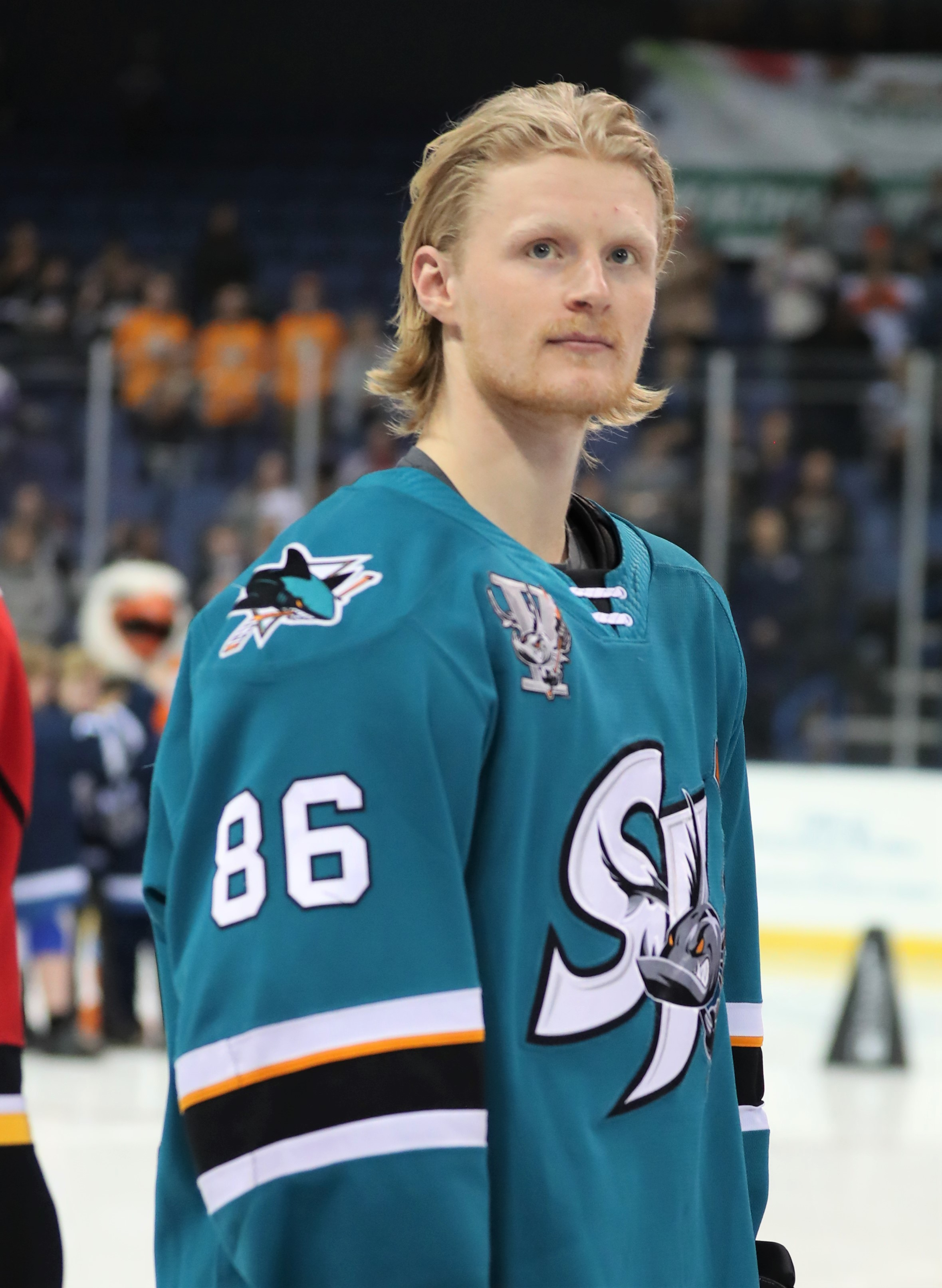
- Blichfeld with the San Jose Barracuda in 2020
- Born: 17 July 1998 (age 28) Frederikshavn, Denmark
- Height: 6 ft 2 in (188 cm)
- Weight: 196 lb (89 kg; 14 st 0 lb)
- Position: Right wing
- Shoots: Right
- Liiga team Former teams: Tappara; Rögle BK; San Jose Sharks; Frederikshavn White Hawks; Växjö Lakers
- National team: Denmark
- NHL draft: 210th overall, 2016; San Jose Sharks
- Playing career: 2018–present

Joachim Blichfeld (born 17 July 1998) is a Danish professional ice hockey player who is a right winger for Tappara of the Liiga. He was drafted by the San Jose Sharks in the seventh round, 210th overall, in the 2016 NHL entry draft, and played eight games with them during the 2019–20 and 2020–21 seasons.

== Playing career ==
Following two seasons in the Malmö Redhawks organization, Blichfeld was selected in the seventh round (210th overall) by the San Jose Sharks in the 2016 NHL entry draft. He joined the Portland Winterhawks in the Western Hockey League for the 2016–17 campaign, where he recorded 28 goals and 30 assists in 58 games. On 28 December 2017, the Sharks signed Blichfeld to a three-year, entry-level contract.

Blichfeld led the WHL in scoring with 114 points in 68 games during the 2018–19 season, earning the Four Broncos Memorial Trophy as "player of the year."

Blichfeld joined the Sharks' American Hockey League (AHL) affiliate, the San Jose Barracuda, to begin the 2019–20 season. On 12 December 2019, the Sharks recalled him. He made his NHL debut that night in a 6–3 loss to the New York Rangers. Blichfeld finished the season with three scoreless appearances for the Sharks. He also had 32 points in 44 games for the Barracuda and was named to the AHL All-Star Classic.

With the 2020–21 season delayed due to the COVID-19 pandemic, the Sharks loaned Blichfeld to his hometown Frederikshavn White Hawks of the Metal Ligaen on 27 October 2020. He scored 12 points in as many games before returning to San Jose for the team's training camp. On 3 March 2021, Blichfeld delivered an illegal check to the head of Colorado Avalanche forward Nathan MacKinnon. He was removed from the contest and was given a two-game suspension the following day. He scored his first NHL goal on 24 April 2021, in a 3–6 loss to the Minnesota Wild. After the 2020–21 season, he signed a one-year contract with the Sharks.

As a pending restricted free agent from the Sharks following the 2021–22 season, Blichfeld opted to return to Europe in agreeing to a two-year contract with Swedish club, Växjö Lakers of the SHL, on 8 June 2022.

During the 2024–25 season, his third with the Lakers, Blichfeld left the club following 37 appearances and joined fellow SHL club, Rögle BK, for the remainder of the year on 29 January 2025.

On the 8th of May 2025 Blichfeld was transferred to the Finnish club Tappara in the Finnish Liiga.

== Career statistics ==
=== Regular season and playoffs ===
			Regular season					Playoffs
Season	Team	League	GP	G	A	Pts	PIM	GP	G	A	Pts	PIM
2014–15	Malmö Redhawks J20	J20	2	0	0	0	0	2	0	0	0	2
2015–16	Malmö Redhawks J20	J20	45	15	13	28	10	3	2	0	2	0
2016–17	Portland Winterhawks	WHL	63	28	30	58	34	11	5	5	10	8
2017–18	Portland Winterhawks	WHL	56	24	32	56	51	12	3	6	9	10
2017–18	San Jose Barracuda	AHL	—	—	—	—	—	2	0	0	0	0
2018–19	Portland Winterhawks	WHL	68	53	61	114	70	5	2	2	4	0
2019–20	San Jose Barracuda	AHL	44	16	16	32	26	—	—	—	—	—
2019–20	San Jose Sharks	NHL	3	0	0	0	2	—	—	—	—	—
2020–21	Frederikshavn White Hawks	DEN	12	5	7	12	2	—	—	—	—	—
2020–21	San Jose Barracuda	AHL	25	12	10	22	6	—	—	—	—	—
2020–21	San Jose Sharks	NHL	5	1	0	1	12	—	—	—	—	—
2021–22	San Jose Barracuda	AHL	61	24	21	45	18	—	—	—	—	—
2022–23	Växjö Lakers	SHL	50	10	14	24	19	18	5	3	8	0
2023–24	Växjö Lakers	SHL	50	17	10	27	16	8	1	4	5	0
2024–25	Växjö Lakers	SHL	37	9	7	16	12	—	—	—	—	—
2024–25	Rögle BK	SHL	14	6	3	9	2	2	0	0	0	0
2025–26	Tappara	Liiga	53	33	38	71	16	18	8	3	11	8
NHL totals			8	1	0	1	14	—	—	—	—	—
SHL totals			151	42	34	76	49	28	6	7	13	0

=== International ===
Year	Team	Event	Result	GP	G	A	Pts	PIM
2015	Denmark	U18-D1	P	4	0	0	0	0
2016	Denmark	U18	10th	7	4	2	6	2
2017	Denmark	WJC	5th	5	3	1	4	0
2018	Denmark	WJC	9th	6	3	3	6	4
2021	Denmark	OGQ	Q	3	2	1	3	0
2022	Denmark	WC	9th	7	5	1	6	0
2024	Denmark	WC	13th	6	2	3	5	2
2024	Denmark	OGQ	Q	3	0	3	3	0
2025	Denmark	WC	4th	10	2	6	8	6
2026	Denmark	OG	9th	4	0	2	2	0
2026	Denmark	WC	12th	7	4	2	6	6
Junior totals				22	10	6	16	6
Senior totals				40	15	18	33	14

== Awards and honors ==
Awards	Year
WHL
Four Broncos Memorial Trophy	2018–19
Bob Clarke Trophy	2018–19
AHL
All-Star Game	2020
SHL
Le Mat Trophy	2023
