= Tapiola (disambiguation) =

Tapiola is a garden city district named and developed in the 1950s in the suburbs of the city of Espoo, Finland

Tapiola may also refer to:

- Tapiola, the land of the forest god Tapio (spirit)
- Tapiola (Sibelius), a 1926 symphonic poem by Jean Sibelius
- Tapiola, Michigan, an unincorporated community in Michigan, USA, founded by Finns
- Tapiola Choir, a choir from Espoo, Finland

== See also ==
- Tapio (disambiguation)
