= Kalle Myllymaa =

Finnish ice hockey player

- Born: 25 March 2002 (age 23) Pori, Finland
- Height: 178 cm (5 ft 10 in)
- Weight: 80 kg (176 lb; 12 st 8 lb)
- Position: Forward
- Shoots: Left
- ICEHL team Former teams: EC Red Bull Salzburg; Porin Ässät
- NHL draft: Undrafted
- Playing career: 2021–present

Kalle Myllymaa (born 25 March 2002) is a Finnish professional ice hockey player for EC Red Bull Salzburg of the ICE Hockey League (ICEHL). He plays as a centre, but can play as a winger if needed.

== Career ==
Myllymaa started playing ice hockey in Porin Ässät when he was five years old. in the 2017–18 season he was the captain of the C-junior team. He was the team's best player by goals. He also played for the B2-junior team in the playoffs, which ended in a silver medal. In the 2020–21 season he played as captain for the U20 team.

Myllymaa played his professional Liiga debut with Porin Ässät on 18 September 2021, against Oulun Kärpät. Myllymaa scored the first goal of his Liiga career in his fourth match on 28 January 2022 against SaiPa. He also scored three assist points in the same game, which ended in Porin Ässät's 6–5 loss. In the 2022–23 season, Myllymaa played 26 regular season games in Liiga recording five points. He also played a large part of his season in the Porin Ässät's U20 team. He started the 2023–24 season with Porin, but in October 2023 his contract was terminated. He played a total of 51 regular season game Porin Ässät during three seasons.

On 9 October 2023, Myllymaa signed a contract with the Austrian side EC Red Bull Salzburg of the ICE Hockey League. Myllymaa played his first game with organization on the farm team RB Hockey Juniors in the Alps Hockey League. Myllymaa was put on the fourth line for the first squad in a Champions Hockey League (CHL) matchup against the Finnish team Lahti Pelicans.

== Career statistics ==
			Regular season					Playoffs
Season	Team	League	GP	G	A	Pts	PIM	GP	G	A	Pts	PIM
2021–22	Porin Ässät	Liiga	22	2	5	7	4	—	—	—	—	—
Liiga totals			22	2	5	7	4	—	—	—	—	—
