= Marko Kivenmäki =

Finnish ice hockey player and coach (born 1975)

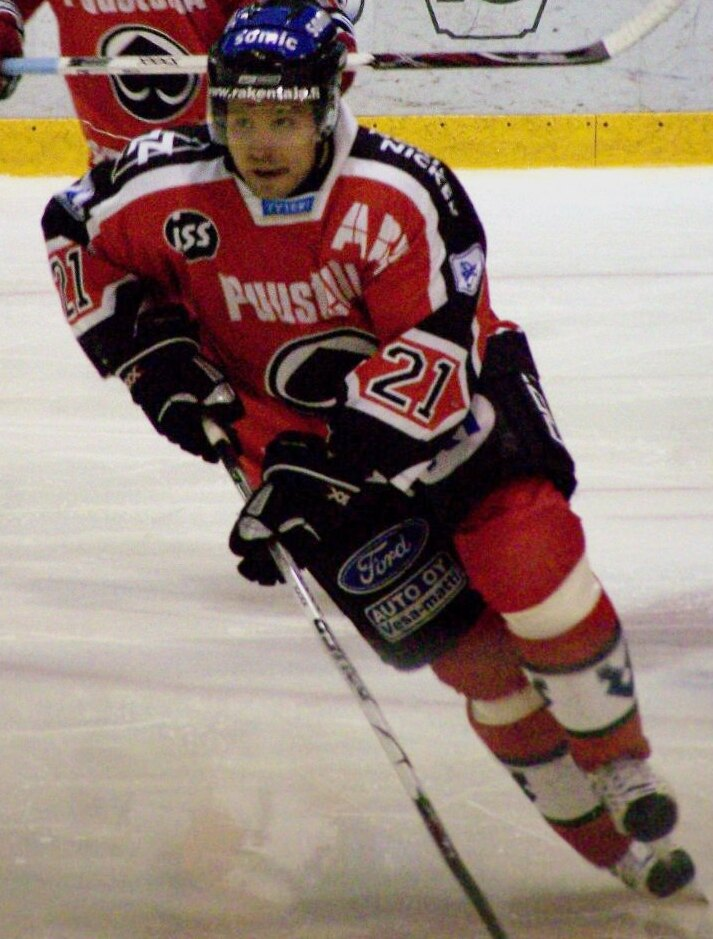
- Kivenmäki with Ässät in 2008
- Born: 20 July 1975 (age 51) Turku, Finland
- Height: 5 ft 8 in (173 cm)
- Weight: 168 lb (76 kg; 12 st 0 lb)
- Position: Wing
- Shot: Left
- Played for: Frisk Asker; Ässät; Lukko; Skellefteå AIK; TPS
- Current coach: IFK Helsinki
- Coached for: Porin Ässät U18; Porin Ässät U16; HC Ässät Pori U20
- NHL draft: Undrafted
- Playing career: 1996–2011
- Coaching career: 2015–present
Medal record
Representing Finland
Men's inline hockey
World Championship
| Gold medal – first place | 2000 Czech Republic |

Marko Kivenmäki (born 20 July 1975) is a Finnish former professional ice hockey player, best known for playing eleven seasons with Ässät in the SM-liiga. He has served as an assistant coach to IFK Helsinki in the Auroraliiga since 2024.

== Ice hockey ==
=== Playing career ===
Originally from Turku, Kivenmäki developed in the minor and junior ice hockey teams of local club HC TPS. Unable to find a place on the TPS team in the SM-liiga, he went to Norway in 1996 to play with Frisk Asker in the Eliteserien (later known as GET-ligaen and EliteHockey Ligaen). During the 1997–98 season, his second in Norway, he ranked second in the league for scoring with 67 points (30 goals+37 assists) across 44 games.

His results in Norway caught the interest of Veli-Pekka Ketola, then head coach of Porin Ässät, and he was recruited to the SM-liiga team. Kivenmäki scored 25 points (9+16) and amassed 94 penalty minutes across 51 games in his first season with Ässät. After two and half seasons with Ässät he was moved to Lukko for the second half of the 2000–01 SM-liiga season.

Most of the 2001–02 season was played with Skellefteå AIK in the Allsvenskan (later called SuperAllsvenskan and HockeyAllsvenskan), Sweden's second-tier national league. The following season, he played 22 games with Frisk Asker in the Norwegian Eliteserien, four games with Ässät in the SM-liiga, one game with the Hull Thunder in the British National League (BNL), and was loaned to Jukurit in the Finnish second-tier national league, the Mestis, for two games.

Rejoining Ässät in 2003, Kivenmäki established himself as a staple of the roster. He ranked second in the league and achieved his SM-liiga career best regular season point record during the 2005–06 season, scoring 53 points (19+34) in 56 games; he was recognized with selection to the 2005–06 SM-liiga All Star Team. His thirteen points in twelve playoff games led all players in the 2006 postseason and helped carry Ässät to the playoff finals where they ultimately lost to HPK and finished as the Finnish Championship silver medalists.

Ässät's fortunes declined after the 2005–06 season but Kivenmäki remained a contributing scorer, scoring above a point-per-game pace in 2006–07 and 2007–08. In the 2008–09 season, his totals dipped to 35 points (11+24) in 57 games – a 0.61 point-per-game rate – but he recovered in the following season to rank sixth in league scoring with 50 points (16+34) in 57 games and a 0.88 point-per-game pace.

Despite his team-leading statistics, Ässät opted not to renew his contract for the 2010–11 season and Kivenmäki signed with the SM-liiga team of his youth club, HC TPS. After amassing 362 points (111+251) and 585 penalty minutes in 515 SM-liiga regular season games, Kivenmäki announced his retirement at the end of the 2010–11 season.

=== Coaching and administrative career ===
Following his retirement from playing, Kivenmäki served as director of hockey operations to Porin Ässät ry, Ässät's junior affiliate club, during the 2011–12 season.

He joined the coaching team of HC Ässät Pori A, the Ässät junior (under-20) team in the Nuorten SM-liiga (renamed U20 SM-sarja in 2020), as an assistant coach in the 2015–16 season and remained in the role through the 2017–18 season.

In 2021, Kivenmäki was appointed head coach of Porin Ässät U16, the Ässät-affiliated under-16 team in the U16 SM-sarja, and he continued with the team through the 2022–23 season. He became head coach of Porin Ässät U18 in the U18 SM-sarja and U18 Mestis in the 2023–24 season and guided the team to its first SM-sarja playoff appearance in five seasons.

After moving to the Helsinki metropolitan area in 2024, Kivenmäki made his first foray into women's ice hockey as an assistant coach to IFK Helsinki (HIFK) in the Auroraliiga.

== Inline hockey ==
Kivenmäki also participated in inline hockey at the national championship and international levels. He played in the Rullakiekon SM-liiga ('Inline Hockey Finnish Championship League') with Kiekko-67 in the 2000s.

With the Finnish men's national inline hockey team, Kivenmäki won a gold medal at the 2000 IIHF InLine Hockey World Championship in Hradec Králové and Choceň, Czech Republic.

== Personal life ==
Kivenmäki's son, Otto Kivenmäki (born 2000), was drafted 191st overall by the Detroit Red Wings in the 2018 NHL entry draft and plays professionally in the Liiga.

Kivenmäki has been married twice. He married former Finnish national ice hockey team player and HIFK head coach Saara Kivenmäki (née Tuominen, previously Niemi) in 2025.
