= Christian Heljanko =

Finnish ice hockey player

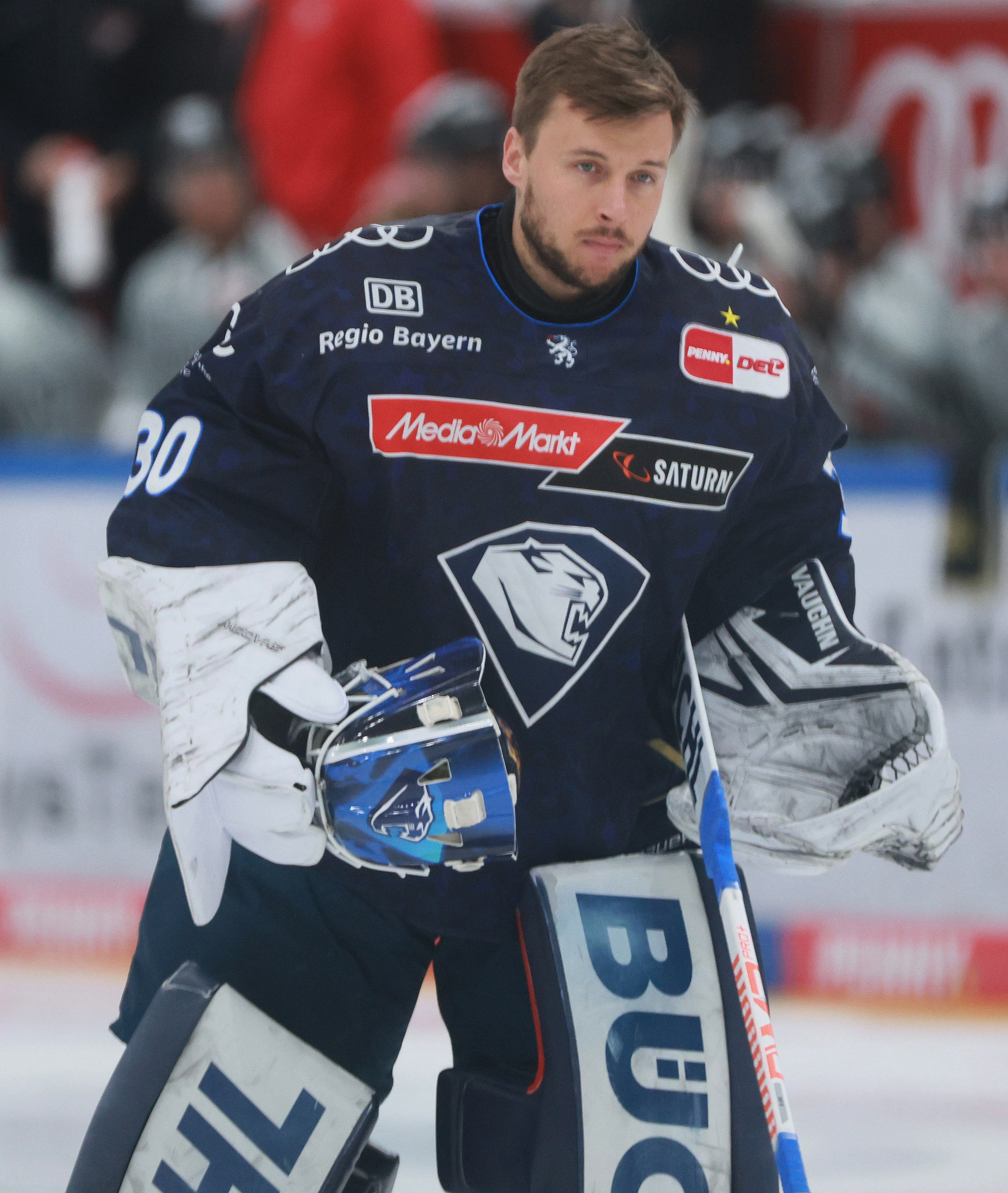
- Heljanko in 2025
- Born: 2 April 1997 (age 29) Porvoo, Finland
- Height: 182 cm (6 ft 0 in)
- Weight: 78 kg (172 lb; 12 st 4 lb)
- Position: Goaltender
- Catches: Left
- Liiga team: Tappara
- National team: Finland
- Playing career: 2015–present

Christian Heljanko (born 2 April 1997) is a Finnish professional ice hockey goaltender for Tappara of the Finnish Liiga. Heljanko made his Liiga debut appearance for Tappara during the 2017–18 Liiga season. In December 2021, he made his debut in the Finland men's national ice hockey team.

== Awards and honours ==
Award	Year
Champions Hockey League
Champion	2022–23
MVP (Most valuable player)	2022–23
Liiga
Champion Kanada-malja	2021–22, 2022–23, 2023–24, 2025–26
Urpo Ylönen award	2021–22, 2022–23, 2023–24
Jari Kurri award	2023–24
