= Aaro Kivilinna Memorial Trophy =

Award given to ice hockey clubs in Finland

The Aaro Kivilinna Memorial Trophy is an award given every year since 1973 to the best ice hockey club overall in Finland by the Finnish SM-liiga. The recipient is determined by the final standings of each club in the SM-liiga or Mestis as well as their teams in the three topmost junior leagues and the women's league. (Thus the winner is quite often another club than the SM-liiga champion of that year.)

Aaro Kivilinna was an ice hockey defenseman from Helsinki, Finland who also worked as a sports journalist and as the secretary and later vice-president of the Finnish Ice Hockey Association. He was killed in action in the Winter War in February 1940.

== Winners of the Aaro Kivilinna Memorial Trophy ==
Season	Team
1972–73	Ilves
1973–74	Ilves
1974–75	Tappara
1975–76	Jokerit
1976–77	TPS
1977–78	Ilves
1978–79	Tappara
1979–80	Ässät
1980–81	Ilves
1981–82	Ilves
1982–83	Ilves
1983–84	Tappara
1984–85	Kärpät
1985–86	HIFK
1986–87	HIFK
1987–88	HIFK
1988–89	HIFK
1989–90	Ilves
1990–91	TPS
1991–92	JYP
1992–93	Ilves
1993–94	Tappara
1994–95	TPS
1995–96	Jokerit
1996–97	Jokerit and TPS (tied)
1997–98	Jokerit
1998–99	Jokerit
1999–00	Jokerit
2000–01	Kärpät
2001–02	TPS
2002–03	Jokerit
2003–04	TPS
2004–05	Kärpät
2005–06	Kärpät
2006–07	Blues
2007–08	Kärpät
2008–09	Blues
2009–10	HIFK
2010–11	Blues
2011–12	Blues
2012–13	Blues
2013–14	Blues
2014–15	Blues
2015–16	Kärpät
2016–17	HIFK
2017–18	Kärpät
2018–19	Kärpät
