= Roope Talaja =

Finnish ice hockey player

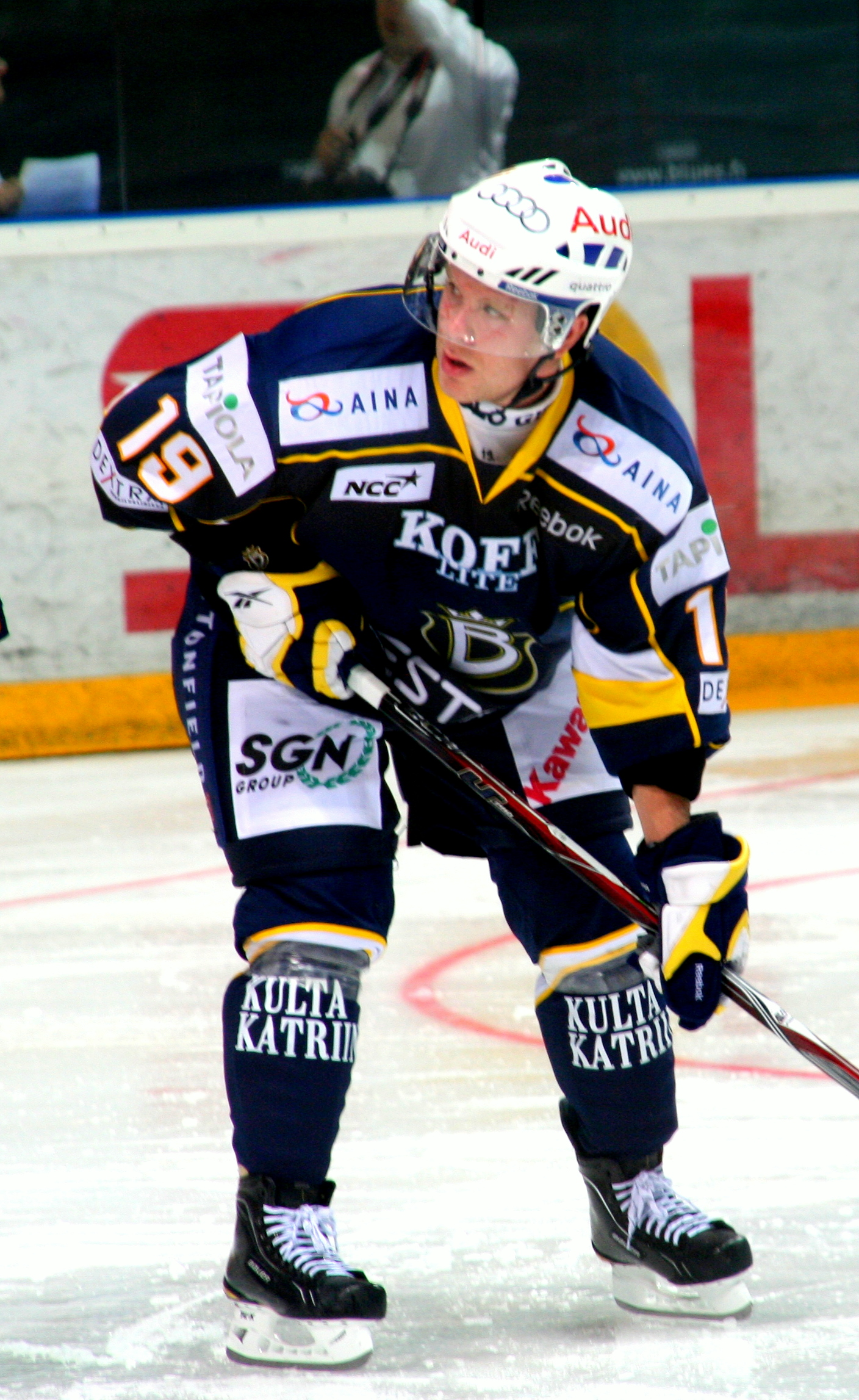
- Born: August 2, 1988 (age 37) Kuopio, Finland
- Height: 5 ft 11 in (180 cm)
- Weight: 192 lb (87 kg; 13 st 10 lb)
- Position: Left wing
- Shoots: Left
- Liiga team Former teams: Espoo Blues; HIFK
- NHL draft: Undrafted
- Playing career: 2008–present

Roope Talaja (born August 2, 1988) is a Finnish professional ice hockey forward. He currently plays for Porin Ässät in the Finnish Liiga.

Talaja has played as a junior for the Blues, before making his professional debut in the Mestis with Kiekko-Vantaa. After making his debut on loan to HIFK in the 2009–10 season, he returned to the Blues to play in his first full SM-liiga season.

On May 3, 2012, Talaja agree to a two-year contract with HIFK. After an unproductive second season with HIFK in 2013–14, in which he totaled just two goals in 31 games, Talaja made a third return to the Espoo Blues in agreeing to a two-year contract on April 4, 2014.

== Career statistics ==
| | | | Regular season | | | | | Playoffs |
| Season | Team | League | GP | G | A | Pts | PIM | GP | G | A | Pts | PIM |
|---|---|---|---|---|---|---|---|---|---|---|---|---|
| 2007–08 | Kiekko-Vantaa | Mestis | 23 | 2 | 2 | 4 | 30 | — | — | — | — | — |
| 2008–09 | Kiekko-Vantaa | Mestis | 39 | 17 | 9 | 26 | 50 | 5 | 0 | 1 | 1 | 14 |
| 2009–10 | Kiekko-Vantaa | Mestis | 34 | 11 | 17 | 28 | 53 | — | — | — | — | — |
| 2009–10 | HIFK | SM-l | 2 | 0 | 1 | 1 | 0 | — | — | — | — | — |
| 2010–11 | Blues | SM-l | 40 | 2 | 3 | 5 | 95 | 18 | 2 | 1 | 3 | 22 |
| 2010–11 | Mikkelin Jukurit | Mestis | 1 | 2 | 1 | 3 | 2 | — | — | — | — | — |
| 2011–12 | Blues | SM-l | 58 | 18 | 8 | 26 | 55 | 16 | 4 | 2 | 6 | 18 |
| 2012–13 | HIFK | SM-l | 57 | 12 | 12 | 24 | 24 | 7 | 0 | 2 | 2 | 2 |
| 2013–14 | HIFK | Liiga | 31 | 2 | 5 | 7 | 8 | 2 | 0 | 0 | 0 | 0 |
| Liiga totals | | | 188 | 34 | 29 | 63 | 182 | 43 | 6 | 5 | 11 | 42 |
