= Lumon arena =

Ice hockey arena in Finland

Kouvola Ice Hall
- Kouvola Areena, Kouvolan jäähalli
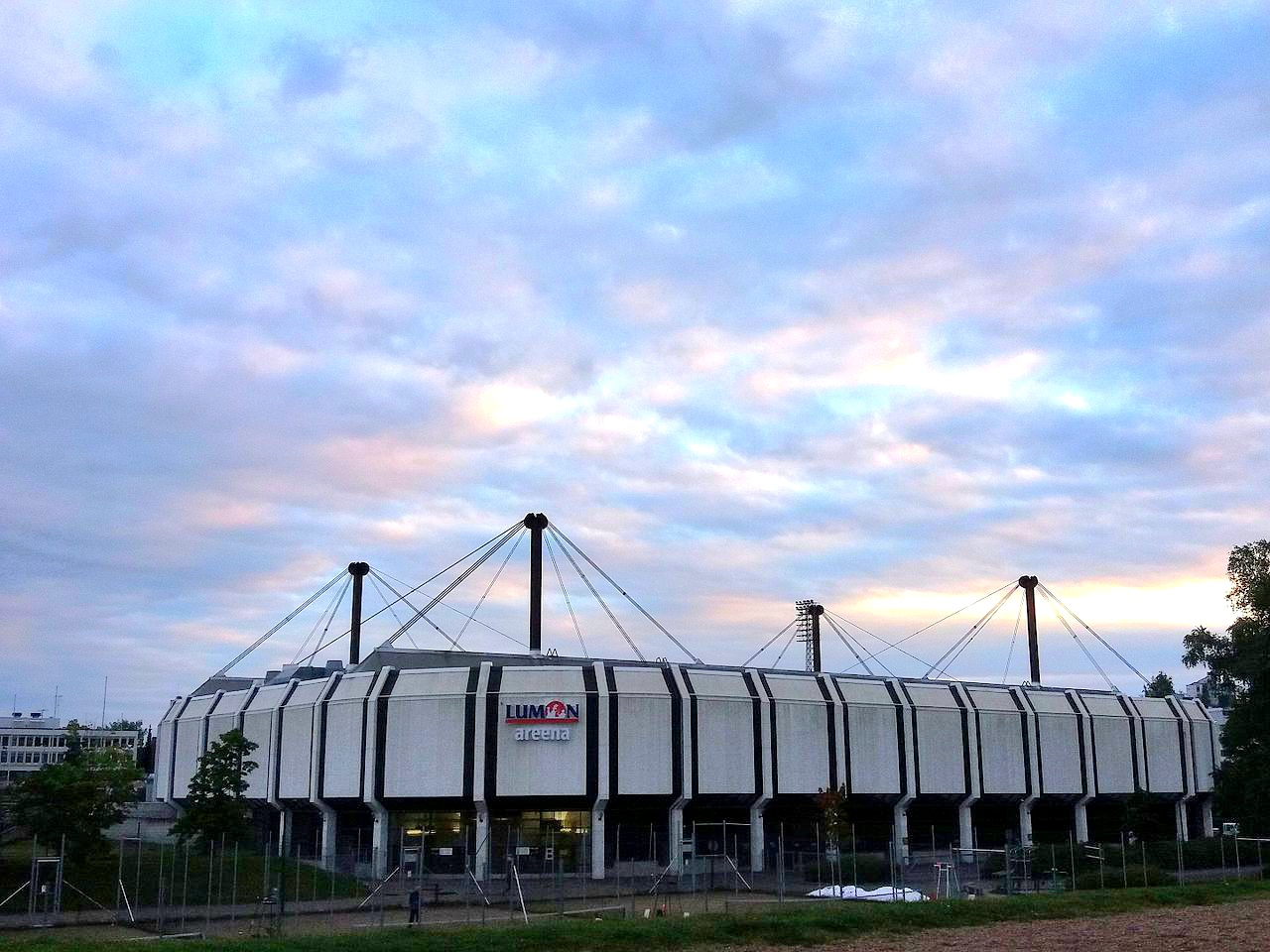
- Interactive map of Kouvola Ice Hall
- Former names: Kouvolan jäähalli (1982–2015) Lumon Arena (2015-2026)
- Location: Topinkuja 1, Kouvola, Finland
- Coordinates: 60°52′21″N 26°42′39″E
- Owner: Sakari Välimaa
- Capacity: (ice hockey); 5,950

Construction
- Groundbreaking: 1972
- Opened: 1982
- Renovated: 2005–2006, 2015, 2018, 2023, 2025
- Cost: 36,000,000 mk (16,000,000 in 2018 euros)

Tenant
- KooKoo (Liiga) (1982–present)

Kouvola Ice Hall is an ice hockey arena located in Kouvola, Finland. The arena has a seating capacity of about 5,950. The arena's official public record is from the 1985, I-Divisioona match KooKoo against SaiPa, followed by 5350 spectators. The name of the Kouvolan jäähalli changed in 2015 as a continuation of the arena when KooKoo and Lumon entered into a co-operation agreement. The cooperation agreement ended in August 2026.

== Sports ==
Kouvola Ice Hall is the home venue of the ice hockey team KooKoo.

The arena has also been used for part of the IIHF European Junior Championships in 1987, there has also played a single Euro Hockey Tour match in 2016, where Finland and Czech Republic national teams were confronted. The match ended with Finland's 4–1 victory. There was also The Kouvot won the Finnish Basketball Championship in 2016.

Including the 1997 European Wrestling Championships was held in there.

In 2018 the Finnish Figure Skating Championships was held in for the first time in Kouvola Ice Hall.

In 2019, there was a single Euro Hockey Challenge/Nordic Cup match between Finland and Sweden, which ended with Finland's 5–4 victory.

== See also ==
- List of indoor arenas in Finland
- List of indoor arenas in Nordic countries
