= Patrik Siikanen =

Finnish ice hockey player

- Born: 16 April 2000 (age 26) Espoo, Finland
- Height: 6 ft 2 in (188 cm)
- Weight: 198 lb (90 kg; 14 st 2 lb)
- Position: Forward
- Shoots: Left
- Liiga team Former teams: SaiPa; JYP
- NHL draft: 195th overall, 2018; Edmonton Oilers
- Playing career: 2016–present

Patrik Siikanen (born 16 April 2000) is a Finnish professional hockey player playing in Liiga for SaiPa. He was drafted by the Edmonton Oilers in the 2018 NHL entry draft.
