= Niklas Virtanen =

Finnish football coach (born 1993)

Personal information
- Date of birth: 11 April 1993 (age 33)
- Place of birth: Finland
- Position: Right back

Team information
- Current team: Midtjylland (sports scientist)

Youth career
- JJK

Senior career*
Years	Team	Apps	(Gls)
- JJK
- Warkaus JK
- Äänekosken Huima
- PPJ

Managerial career
- 2020–2022: HJK (conditioning coach)
- 2023: HJK (performance coach)
- 2024–: Midtjylland (sports scientist)
- * Club domestic league appearances and goals

Niklas Virtanen (born 11 April 1993) is a Finnish football coach and a former footballer who played as a defender. He is currently working as a sports scientist of Danish Superliga club Midtjylland.
