= Joni Tuulola =

Finnish ice hockey player

- Born: 1 January 1996 (age 30) Hämeenlinna, Finland
- Height: 6 ft 3 in (191 cm)
- Weight: 185 lb (84 kg; 13 st 3 lb)
- Position: Defence
- Shoots: Left
- Liiga team Former teams: Tappara; KooKoo; HPK; Vaasan Sport; Rockford IceHogs
- NHL draft: 181st overall, 2015; Chicago Blackhawks
- Playing career: 2014–present

Joni Tuulola (born 1 January 1996) is a Finnish professional ice hockey defenceman who is currently playing with Tappara in the Finnish Liiga. He was selected 181st overall, by the Chicago Blackhawks in the 2015 NHL entry draft.

== Playing career ==
On March 11, 2014, Tuulola made his Liiga debut playing with HPK during the 2013–14 Liiga season. Tuulola spent the first four seasons of his professional career with HPK, before opting to leave the club and sign a two-year contract with fellow Finnish outfit, Vaasan Sport, on April 11, 2017.

Upon completing the 2017–18 season with Sport having notched a career high 7 goals, 23 assists and 30 points, Tuulola was signed to a two-year, entry-level contract with the Chicago Blackhawks on March 27, 2018. He was immediately reassigned to begin his North American career with AHL affiliate, the Rockford IceHogs, on an amateur try-out contract.

As an impending restricted free agent with the Blackhawks, Tuulola left to return to Finland to start the 2020–21 season, agreeing to a one-year contract with KooKoo of the Liiga on 1 September 2020, with an NHL out clause until the new year.

== Career statistics ==
=== Regular season and playoffs ===
| | | | Regular season | | | | | Playoffs |
| Season | Team | League | GP | G | A | Pts | PIM | GP | G | A | Pts | PIM |
|---|---|---|---|---|---|---|---|---|---|---|---|---|
| 2012–13 | HPK | Jr. A | 6 | 1 | 0 | 1 | 4 | — | — | — | — | — |
| 2013–14 | HPK | Jr. A | 47 | 8 | 16 | 24 | 34 | 3 | 0 | 0 | 0 | 0 |
| 2013–14 | HPK | Liiga | 2 | 1 | 0 | 1 | 0 | 2 | 0 | 0 | 0 | 0 |
| 2014–15 | HPK | Jr. A | 6 | 0 | 4 | 4 | 2 | — | — | — | — | — |
| 2014–15 | HPK | Liiga | 32 | 5 | 5 | 10 | 8 | — | — | — | — | — |
| 2015–16 | HPK | Jr. A | 4 | 0 | 4 | 4 | 2 | 8 | 0 | 2 | 2 | 10 |
| 2015–16 | HPK | Liiga | 53 | 2 | 12 | 14 | 18 | — | — | — | — | — |
| 2016–17 | HPK | Liiga | 54 | 2 | 6 | 8 | 12 | 7 | 0 | 1 | 1 | 12 |
| 2017–18 | Sport | Liiga | 58 | 7 | 23 | 30 | 59 | — | — | — | — | — |
| 2017–18 | Rockford IceHogs | AHL | 2 | 0 | 0 | 0 | 0 | 4 | 0 | 0 | 0 | 2 |
| 2018–19 | Rockford IceHogs | AHL | 52 | 4 | 10 | 14 | 17 | — | — | — | — | — |
| 2019–20 | Rockford IceHogs | AHL | 56 | 2 | 6 | 8 | 22 | — | — | — | — | — |
| Liiga totals | | | 199 | 17 | 46 | 63 | 97 | 9 | 0 | 1 | 1 | 12 |

=== International ===
Medal record

Representing Finland

Ice hockey

World Junior Championships
| Gold medal – first place | 2016 Finland | |

| Year | Team | Event | Result | GP | G | A | Pts | PIM |
|---|---|---|---|---|---|---|---|---|
| 2013 | Finland | U17 | 7th | 5 | 1 | 1 | 2 | 6 |
| 2014 | Finland | WJC18 | 6th | 5 | 0 | 0 | 0 | 4 |
| 2016 | Finland | WJC | 1st place, gold medalist(s) | 7 | 0 | 1 | 1 | 4 |
| Junior totals | | | | 17 | 1 | 2 | 3 | 14 |
