= Radek Kučeřík =

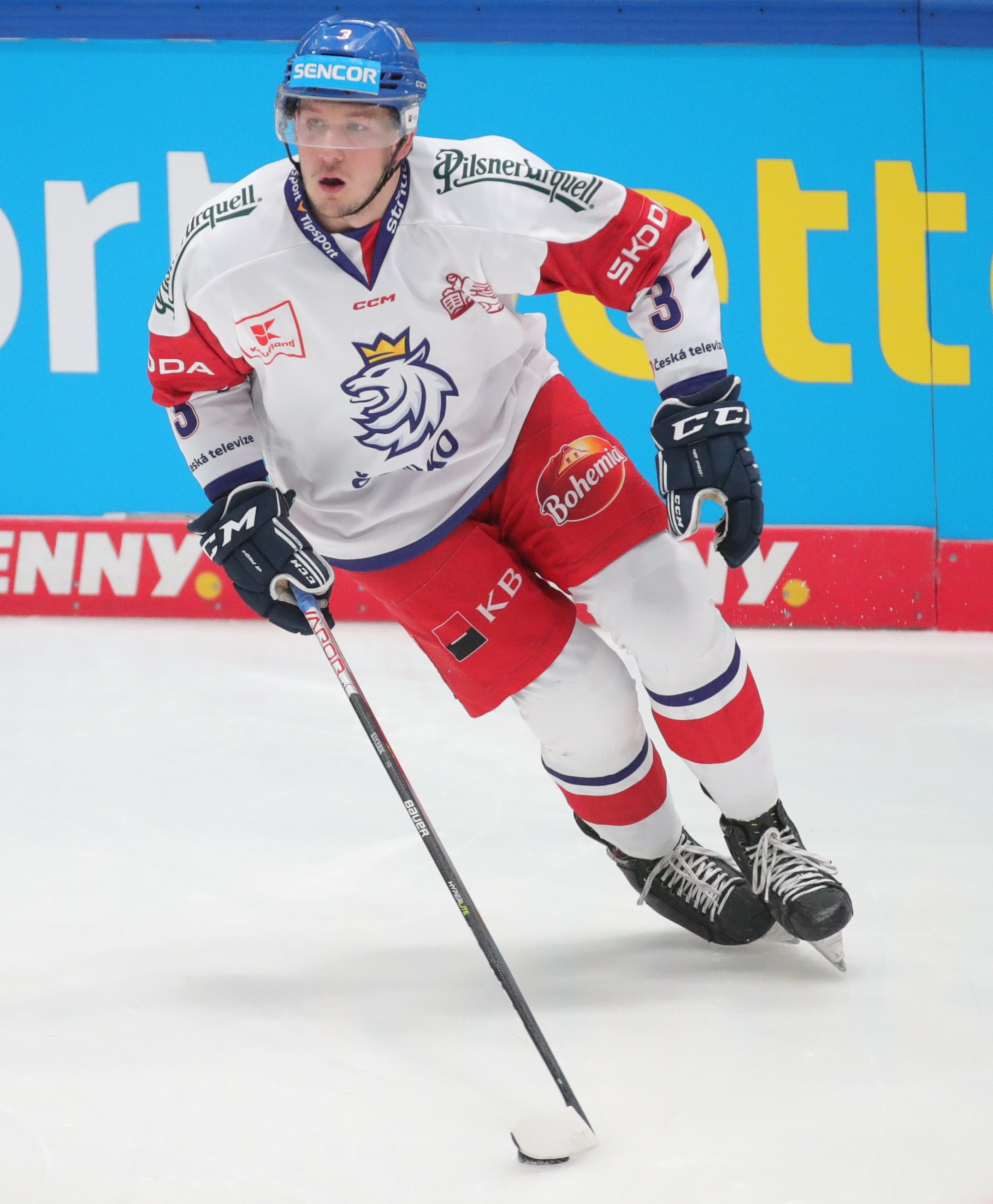
- Kučeřík with the Czech Republic
- Born: 21 December 2001 (age 23) Kyjov, Czech Republic
- Height: 184 cm (6 ft 0 in)
- Weight: 97 kg (214 lb; 15 st 4 lb)
- Position: Defence
- Shoots: Left
- Liiga team Former teams: HC Ässät Pori; HC Kometa Brno
- National team: Czech Republic
- Playing career: 2018–present

Radek Kučeřík (born 21 December 2001) is a Czech ice hockey defenceman playing for the HC Ässät Pori of the Finnish Elite League as of the 2024–25 season. Kučeřík has represented the Czech Republic internationally in the World Junior Championship.

Kučeřík previously represented the HC Kometa Brno of the Czech Extraliga as well as the Saskatoon Blades of the Western Hockey League (WHL).

== Career ==
Kučeřík played his junior career with the HC Kometa Brno, making his first senior appearance for the club during the 2018–19 Czech Extraliga season. Kučeřík played the 2019–20 season with the Western hockey League side Saskatoon Blades before returning to the Czech Republic.

For the 2024–25 season, Kučeřík moved to the HC Ässät Pori of the Finnish Elite League on a one-year contract.

== Career statistics ==
=== International ===
| Year | Team | Event | Result | GP | G | A | Pts | PIM |
|---|---|---|---|---|---|---|---|---|
| 2019 | Czech Republic | U18 | 6th | 5 | 0 | 1 | 1 | 8 |
| 2020 | Czech Republic | WJC | 7th | 5 | 0 | 0 | 0 | 6 |
| 2021 | Czech Republic | WJC | 7th | 5 | 0 | 0 | 0 | 0 |
| Junior totals | | | | 15 | 0 | 1 | 1 | 14 |
| Senior totals | | | | – | – | – | – | – |
