= Santeri Airola =

Finnish ice hockey player (born 2000)

- Born: 29 June 2000 (age 25) Imatra, Finland
- Height: 5 ft 11 in (180 cm)
- Weight: 163 lb (74 kg; 11 st 9 lb)
- Position: Defence
- Shoots: Right
- Liiga team Former teams: SaiPa; Ilves
- NHL draft: 211th overall, 2019; Pittsburgh Penguins
- Playing career: 2018–present

Santeri Airola (born 29 June 2000) is a Finnish professional ice hockey defenceman. He is currently playing for SaiPa of the Liiga. Airola was drafted 211th overall by the Pittsburgh Penguins in the 2019 NHL entry draft.

== Playing career ==
Airola played as a youth within the SaiPa organization before moving to hometown Mestis club, Imatran Ketterä. He made his Liiga debut on loan with SaiPa on 29 December 2018 against Ilves. He went onto to play three games for SaiPa during the 2018–19 Liiga season.

On 24 March 2020, Airola left Ketterä agreeing to an optional three-year contract with Liiga club, Ilves.

== Career statistics ==
			Regular season					Playoffs
Season	Team	League	GP	G	A	Pts	PIM	GP	G	A	Pts	PIM
2016–17	SaiPa	Jr. A	1	0	0	0	0	—	—	—	—	—
2017–18	Ketterä	Jr. B	40	6	25	31	26	3	0	0	0	0
2018–19	SaiPa	Jr. A	41	4	27	31	20	—	—	—	—	—
2018–19	SaiPa	Liiga	3	0	0	0	2	—	—	—	—	—
2019–20	Ketterä	Mestis	26	0	11	11	14	—	—	—	—	—
2019–20	SaiPa	Liiga	2	0	0	0	0	—	—	—	—	—
2020–21	Ilves	Liiga	19	0	3	3	6	—	—	—	—	—
2020–21	KOOVEE	Mestis	2	0	1	1	0	—	—	—	—	—
2021–22	KOOVEE	Mestis	2	0	0	0	2	—	—	—	—	—
2022–23	Ilves	Liiga	5	0	0	0	2	—	—	—	—	—
2022–23	SaiPa	Liiga	10	0	7	7	0	—	—	—	—	—
2022–23	KOOVEE	Mestis	29	8	14	22	22	—	—	—	—	—
2023–24	SaiPa	Liiga	39	5	7	12	16	—	—	—	—	—
Liiga totals			78	5	17	22	26	—	—	—	—	—
