= Miikka Salomäki =

Finnish ice hockey player

Miika Salomäki
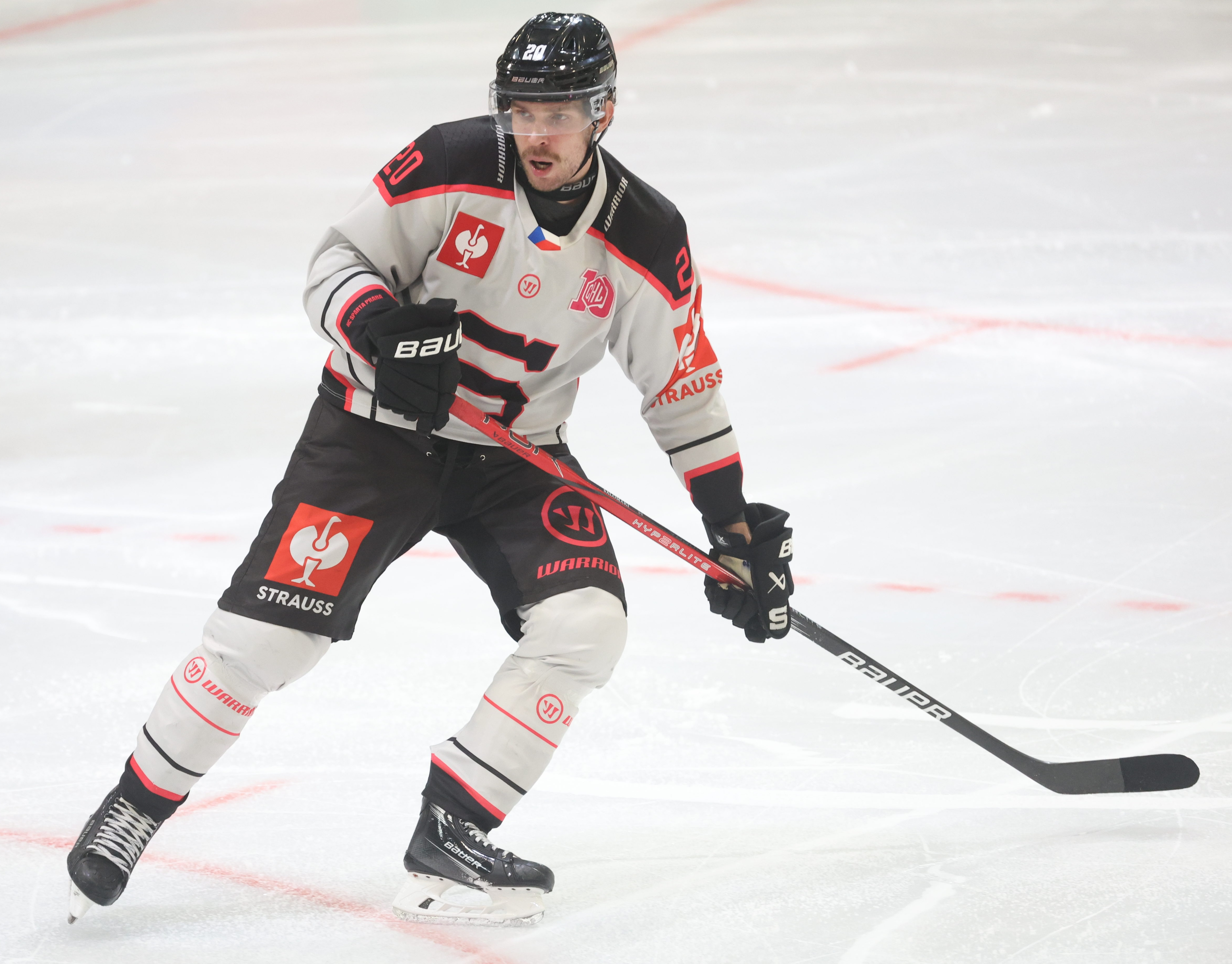
- Salomäki with Sparta Prague in 2024
- Born: 9 March 1993 (age 33) Raahe, Finland
- Height: 5 ft 11 in (180 cm)
- Weight: 209 lb (95 kg; 14 st 13 lb)
- Position: Left wing
- Shoots: Left
- Liiga team Former teams: SaiPa; Kärpät; Nashville Predators; Örebro HK; HIFK; Lausanne HC; HC Sparta Praha
- National team: Finland
- NHL draft: 52nd overall, 2011; Nashville Predators
- Playing career: 2010–present

Miikka Salomäki (born 9 March 1993) is a Finnish professional ice hockey forward currently playing with SaiPa of the Finnish Liiga.

== Playing career ==
Salomäki was drafted in the second round, 52nd overall. by the Nashville Predators at the 2011 NHL entry draft in St. Paul, Minnesota. He was their second pick in the draft, selected from playing with the Finnish Liiga with Oulun Kärpät. Salomäki was recalled to the Predators on 8 January 2015. He made his NHL debut and scored his first career NHL goal later that night against Kari Lehtonen of the Dallas Stars in a game where his team would go on to win 3–2 in overtime.

Heading into his seventh year within the Predators organization, Salomäki continued to play between the NHL and AHL, beginning the 2019–20 season with the Milwaukee Admirals. He was recalled and appeared in 5 games with Nashville before returning to the Admirals. After registering just 15 points through 41 games in the AHL, Salomäki's tenure with the Predators ended as he was traded to the Toronto Maple Leafs in exchange for Ben Harpur on 22 February 2020. He remained in the AHL joining the Maple Leafs' AHL affiliate, the Toronto Marlies, registering 2 goals and 4 points in 8 games before the season was cancelled due to the COVID-19 pandemic.

As a free agent from his brief tenure within the Maple Leafs organization, Salomäki returned to the Western Conference in agreeing to a one-year, two-way contract to join the Colorado Avalanche on 9 October 2020. After attending the Avalanche training camp for the pandemic delayed 2020–21 season, Salomäki was among the last cuts assigned to AHL affiliate, the Colorado Eagles. He made 26 regular-season appearances with the Eagles, adding just 2 goals and 12 points, while also spending time with the Avalanche as a part of the extended roster on the taxi squad and later as a black ace in the playoffs.

With his contract concluded with the Avalanche, Salomäki opted to leave North America as a free agent in agreeing to a two-year contract with Swedish club, Örebro HK of the Swedish Hockey League (SHL) on 23 June 2021. In the 2021–22 season, Salomäki in making with SHL debut, appeared in 34 regular season games, contributing with 3 goals and 11 points. At the tail end of the season, Salomäki left his contract early in returning to Finland and playing out the remainder of the season with HIFK of the Liiga on 28 February 2022.

After a short playoff run with HIFK, Salomäki left his brief return in the Liiga to sign a two-year contract with Swiss club Lausanne HC of the NL on 10 June 2022.

== Career statistics ==
=== Regular season and playoffs ===
			Regular season					Playoffs
Season	Team	League	GP	G	A	Pts	PIM	GP	G	A	Pts	PIM
2009–10	Kärpät	FIN U18	1	1	1	2	2	—	—	—	—	—
2009–10	Kärpät	FIN U20	37	18	25	43	93	—	—	—	—	—
2010–11	Kärpät	SM-l	40	4	6	10	53	3	0	1	1	27
2010–11	Suomi U20	Mestis	3	1	1	2	27	—	—	—	—	—
2011–12	Kärpät	SM-l	40	12	9	21	56	7	1	0	1	56
2012–13	Kärpät	SM-l	42	9	10	19	44	3	2	0	2	14
2013–14	Milwaukee Admirals	AHL	75	20	30	50	83	3	0	0	0	6
2014–15	Milwaukee Admirals	AHL	38	7	11	18	30	—	—	—	—	—
2014–15	Nashville Predators	NHL	1	1	0	1	0	—	—	—	—	—
2015–16	Milwaukee Admirals	AHL	4	1	1	2	4	—	—	—	—	—
2015–16	Nashville Predators	NHL	61	5	5	10	28	14	1	1	2	6
2016–17	Nashville Predators	NHL	5	0	0	0	2	6	0	0	0	2
2016–17	Milwaukee Admirals	AHL	4	1	0	1	4	—	—	—	—	—
2017–18	Nashville Predators	NHL	58	2	6	8	34	8	0	0	0	2
2018–19	Nashville Predators	NHL	37	3	4	7	8	2	0	1	1	0
2018–19	Milwaukee Admirals	AHL	3	1	1	2	2	—	—	—	—	—
2019–20	Milwaukee Admirals	AHL	41	5	10	15	35	—	—	—	—	—
2019–20	Nashville Predators	NHL	5	1	0	1	4	—	—	—	—	—
2019–20	Toronto Marlies	AHL	8	2	2	4	2	—	—	—	—	—
2020–21	Colorado Eagles	AHL	26	2	10	12	16	2	0	0	0	19
2021–22	Örebro HK	SHL	34	3	8	11	20	—	—	—	—	—
2021–22	HIFK	Liiga	2	0	0	0	0	7	1	0	1	2
2022–23	Lausanne HC	NL	40	4	14	18	60	—	—	—	—	—
Liiga totals			124	25	25	50	153	20	4	1	5	99
NHL totals			167	12	15	27	76	30	1	2	3	10

=== International ===
Medal record

Representing Finland

Ice hockey

World Championships
Silver medal – second place	2014 Belarus	

IIHF World U18 Championships
Bronze medal – third place	2010 Belarus	

Year	Team	Event	Result	GP	G	A	Pts	PIM
2010	Finland	U17	10th	5	2	1	3	8
2010	Finland	WJC18	3rd place, bronze medalist(s)	5	0	1	1	4
2011	Finland	WJC	6th	6	2	1	3	14
2011	Finland	WJC18	5th	6	4	2	6	2
2012	Finland	WJC	4th	7	3	3	6	4
2013	Finland	WJC	7th	6	3	5	8	6
2014	Finland	WC	2nd place, silver medalist(s)	10	1	1	2	18
Junior totals				35	14	13	27	38
Senior totals				10	1	1	2	18
