= Jan Bednář =

Czech ice hockey player (born 2002)

- Born: 26 August 2002 (age 23) Karlovy Vary, Czech Republic
- Height: 6 ft 4 in (193 cm)
- Weight: 196 lb (89 kg; 14 st 0 lb)
- Position: Goaltender
- Catches: Left
- Liiga team Former teams: Ässät; HC Karlovy Vary
- NHL draft: 107th overall, 2020; Detroit Red Wings
- Playing career: 2018–present

Jan Bednář (born 26 August 2002) is a Czech professional ice hockey goaltender for Ässät of the Finnish Liiga. Bednář was drafted 107th overall by the Detroit Red Wings in the 2020 NHL entry draft.

== Playing career ==
During the 2018–19 Czech Extraliga season, Bednář made his professional debut for HC Karlovy Vary at the age of 16, becoming the youngest goaltender to play for Karlovy Vary. He recorded a 2.73 goals-against average (GAA) and .917 save percentage in 10 games. During the 2019–20 Czech Extraliga season, he recorded a 4.39 GAA and .884 save percentage in 13 games for Karlovy Vary. He also spent time with HC Banik Sokolov of Czech 2.liga, where he posted a 3.26 GAA and a .873 save percentage in 24 games.

Bednář was drafted second overall by the Acadie–Bathurst Titan in the CHL Import Draft. The Titans signed him on August 25, 2020.

Having concluded his junior career with the Titan, on 15 March 2023, Bednář embarked on his North American professional career in signing a two-year AHL contract with the Grand Rapids Griffins, the primary affiliate to draft club, the Detroit Red Wings. He was then assigned to ECHL affiliate, the Toledo Walleye for the remainder of the 2022–23 season. He appeared in three games with a 1–1–0 record, a 3.01 GAA, and a .901 save percentage. During the 2023–24 season, in his first full pro season in North America with the Walleye, he appeared in 36 regular season games and posted a 22–7–2 record, with a 2.66 GAA and a .901 save percentage. On 3 June 2024, Bednar signed a one-year contract extension with the Griffins.

After three seasons within the Red Wings organization, Bednář left after his contract expired and returned to Europe, signing a one-year contract with Finnish club Ässät of the Liiga, on 19 June 2025.

== International play ==
Bednář represented the Czech Republic at the 2019 IIHF World U18 Championships, where he recorded a 3.21 GAA and a .892 save percentage. He represented the Czech Republic at the 2022 World Junior Ice Hockey Championships.

== Career statistics ==
=== Regular season and playoffs ===
			Regular season									Playoffs
Season	Team	League	GP	W	L	OTL	MIN	GA	SO	GAA	SV%	GP	W	L	MIN	GA	SO	GAA	SV%
2018–19	HC Karlovy Vary	ELH	10	2	8	0	593	27	0	2.73	.917	—	—	—	—	—	—	—	—
2019–20	HC Karlovy Vary	ELH	13	2	9	0	710	52	1	4.39	.883	—	—	—	—	—	—	—	—
2019–20	Banik Sokolov	CZE.2	24	8	16	0	—	—	1	3.26	.873	—	—	—	—	—	—	—	—
2020–21	HC Karlovy Vary	ELH	5	3	2	0	231	16	0	4.16	.866	—	—	—	—	—	—	—	—
2020–21	Acadie–Bathurst Titan	QMJHL	12	6	5	0	679	41	0	3.62	.894	7	3	4	462	25	0	3.24	.908
2021–22	Acadie–Bathurst Titan	QMJHL	47	28	14	4	2,733	124	2	2.72	.912	8	3	5	532	26	0	2.93	.895
2022–23	Acadie–Bathurst Titan	QMJHL	10	4	5	1	564	42	0	4.46	.874	—	—	—	—	—	—	—	—
2022–23	Toledo Walleye	ECHL	3	1	1	0	140	7	0	3.01	.901	—	—	—	—	—	—	—	—
2023–24	Toledo Walleye	ECHL	36	22	7	6	2146	95	3	2.66	.901	5	4	1	304	12	0	2.37	.917
2024–25	Toledo Walleye	ECHL	37	23	8	6	2259	88	4	2.34	.914	12	7	5	711	28	1	2.37	.909
2024–25	Grand Rapids Griffins	AHL	4	1	2	0	198	7	0	2.12	.919	—	—	—	—	—	—	—	—
ELH totals			28	7	19	0	1,534	95	1	3.72	.893	—	—	—	—	—	—	—	—

=== International ===
Year	Team	Event	Result	GP	W	L	MIN	GA	SO	GAA	SV%
2019	Czechia	U17	3rd place, bronze medalist(s)	3	0	3	149	12	0	4.83	.848
2019	Czechia	U18	6th	2	0	1	78	4	0	3.09	.902
2022	Czechia	WJC	4th	3	1	2	165	11	0	4.00	.851
Junior totals				8	1	6	392	27	0	4.13	.861
