= Miska Siikonen =

Finnish ice hockey player

- Born: 12 May 1996 (age 30) Tampere, Finland
- Height: 6 ft 3 in (191 cm)
- Weight: 205 lb (93 kg; 14 st 9 lb)
- Position: Forward
- Shoots: Left
- Liiga team Former teams: KooKoo; Lahti Pelicans; JYP Jyväskylä; HV71; SaiPa
- Playing career: 2014–present

Miska Siikonen (born 12 May 1996) is a Finnish professional ice hockey player. He is currently playing with KooKoo in the Finnish Liiga.

== Playing career ==
Siikonen made his Liiga debut playing with the Lahti Pelicans during the 2014–15 season.

After splitting the 2020–21 season between Liiga outfit, JYP Jyväskylä, and HV71 of the Swedish Hockey League (SHL), Siikonen returned to Finland, agreeing to an optional two-year contract with his third Liiga club, KooKoo, on 3 May 2021.
