= Peter Tiivola =

Finnish ice hockey player

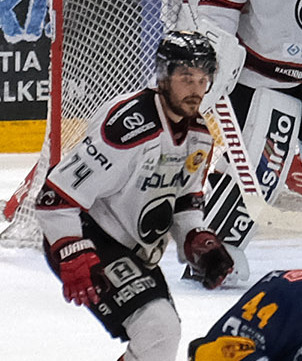
- Born: September 5, 1993 (age 33) Helsinki, Finland
- Height: 6 ft 4 in (193 cm)
- Weight: 203 lb (92 kg; 14 st 7 lb)
- Position: Forward
- Shoots: Left
- Liiga team Former teams: HC Ässät Pori; Espoo Blues; Lukko; Dinamo Riga; Kärpät
- National team: Finland
- Playing career: 2013–present

Medal record

Representing Finland

Ice hockey

World Championships
Silver medal – second place	2021 Latvia	

Peter Tiivola (born September 5, 1993) is a Finnish professional ice hockey Forward. His is currently playing with HC Ässät Pori in the Liiga.

== Playing career ==
Tiivola made his Liiga debut playing with Espoo Blues during the 2013–14 Liiga season.

Following his eighth season in the Finnish Liiga, Tiivola signed his first contract abroad, agreeing to a one-year contract with Latvian-based KHL club, Dinamo Riga, on 18 June 2021.

== Career statistics ==
=== International ===
Year	Team	Event	Result	GP	G	A	Pts	PIM
2021	Finland	WC	2nd place, silver medalist(s)	2	0	1	1	0
Senior totals				2	0	1	1	0
