= Patrik Juhola =

Finnish Ice hockey player

- Born: December 16, 2003 (age 22) Ylöjärvi, Pirkanmaa, Finland
- Height: 191 cm (6 ft 3 in)
- Weight: 93 kg (205 lb; 14 st 9 lb)
- Position: Centre
- Shoots: Left
- Liiga team Former teams: Porin Ässät; Kokkolan Hermes
- National team: Finland
- Playing career: 2023–present

Patrik Juhola (born 16 December 2003) is a Finnish ice hockey player who is currently under a contract with Porin Ässät of the Liiga. Juhola was selected as the best player of the month in the U20 SM-sarja in the 2021–22 season when he put up 39 points in 40 games as a 17 year old. Juhola has played 3 WJC games putting up one point.

According to scouting reports, Juhola has a powerful and fast wrist shot and he is good at passing the puck to his wingers and has great puck control.

== Career ==
=== Junior ===
Juhola started his career playing for HC Nokia's U16 team. In the U16 SM-sarja Q. After he put up 29 points in 27 games, he got promoted to the U16 SM-sarja team, where he put up 15 points in 18 games.

The next season, Juhola moved on to play for Porin Ässät U17 where he put up 21 points in 14 games, after which he got to play in the U18 team. He played 3 games without any points, after which he played in the U18 Ässät Akatemia for one game.

During the 2020–21 season he played as captain for the Ässät U18 team where he played 30 games with 33 points.

In the 2021–22 he got to play in the U20 Ässät team where he played 40 games with 39 points, which means he had a PPG of 0.98. He also got to play in the Hermes of the Mestis as a loanee. He played for three games and put up three points. He played three playoff games with Ässät U20 and scored 4 points.

In 2021, Patrik Juhola signed a contract with Ässät until the 2024–25 season. The next season Juhola played 36 games for the U20 team and scored 32 points. In addition to the regular season, Ässät U20 made the playoffs where Juhola scored 4 points in 10 games. Ässät U20 lost the bronze game to HC TPS U20.

== Career statistics ==
=== Regular season and playoffs ===
			Regular season					Playoffs
Season	Team	League	GP	G	A	Pts	PIM	GP	G	A	Pts	PIM
2021–22	Ässät Jr.	Fin-Jr.	40	20	19	39	24	3	0	4	4	0
2021–22	Hermes	Mestis	3	2	1	3	0	—	—	—	—	—
