= LähiTapiola-areena =

Indoor arena in Jyväskylä, Finland

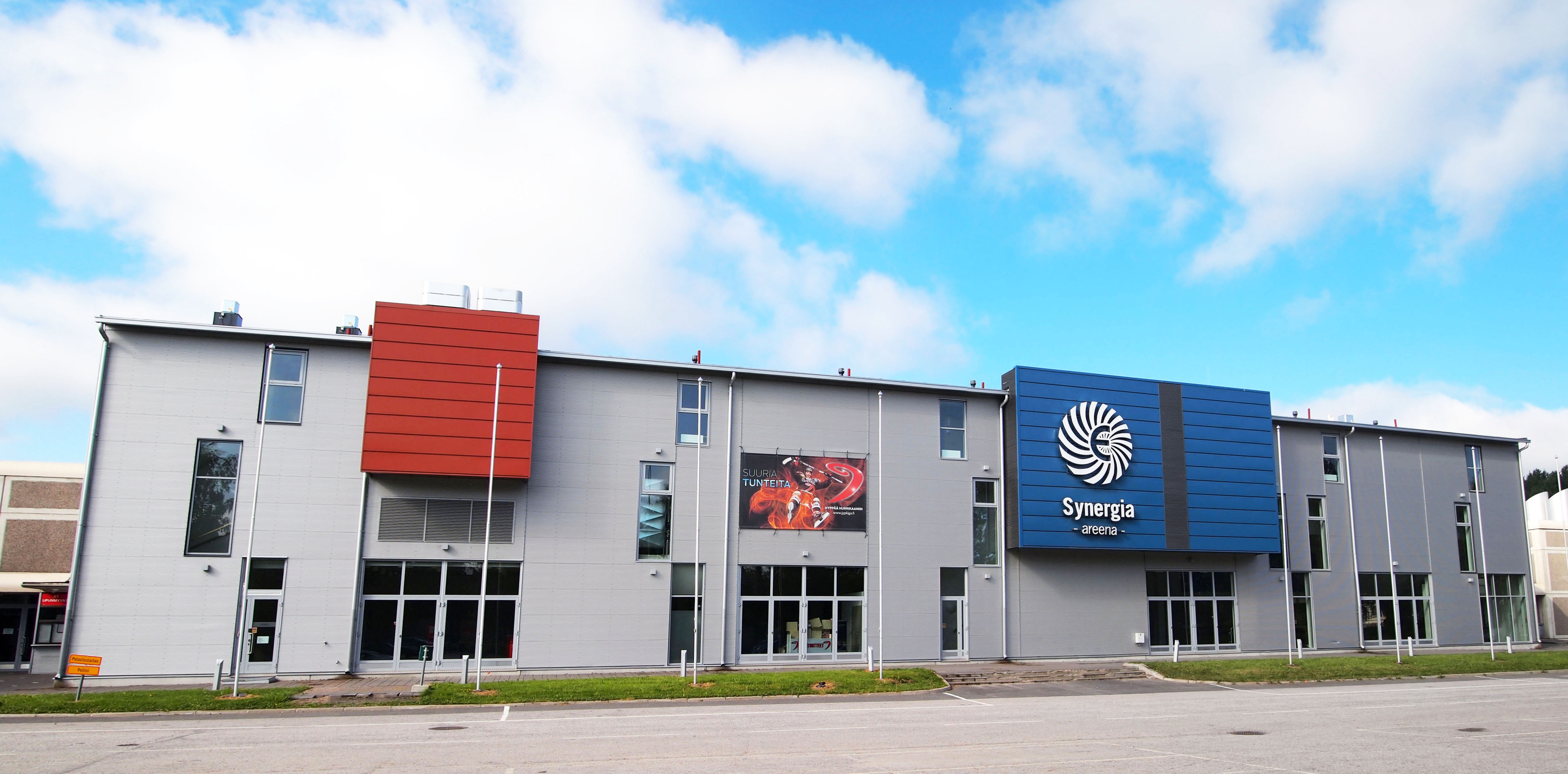
- Interactive map of LähiTapiola-areena
- Former names: Jyväskylän jäähalli, Hippos
- Location: Jyväskylä, Finland
- Coordinates: 62°14′14″N 025°43′21″E
- Owner: City of Jyväskylä
- Capacity: 4,628 (3,006 seated, 1,612 standing)

Construction
- Opened: 1982
- Renovated: 2008

Tenants
- JYP, Jyp-Akatemia and D-kiekko

LähiTapiola is an arena in Jyväskylä, Finland. It is primarily used for ice hockey, and is the home arena of JYP and JYP-Akatemia.

The arena originally opened in 1982 and was then known as Jyväskylän jäähalli. It was renovated and renamed in 2008. The capacity of the arena is 4,628 people. In 2021 city government has decided to buy all shares and move ownership to city of Jyväskylä.
