= Anrei Hakulinen =

Finnish ice hockey player

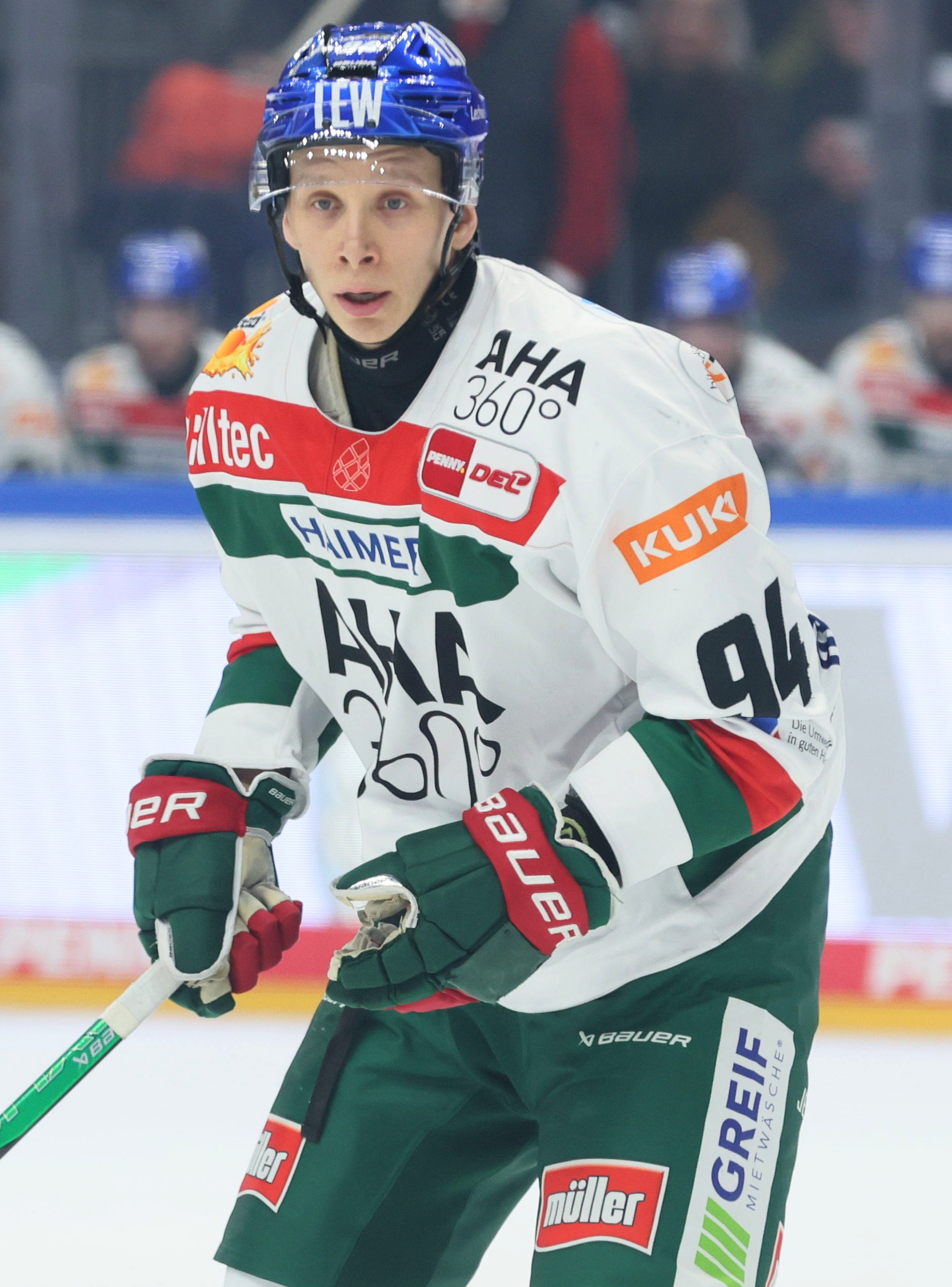
- Hakulinen, 2025
- Born: February 8, 1990 (age 35); Turku, Finland
- Height: 6 ft 2 in (188 cm)
- Weight: 194 lb (88 kg; 13 st 12 lb)
- Position: Forward
- Shoots: Left
- team Former teams: Free agent Pelicans; KooKoo; Lukko; Augsburger Panther
- Playing career: 2010–present

Anrei Hakulinen (born February 8, 1990) is a Finnish ice hockey player. He is currently an unrestricted free agent who most recently played with Augsburger Panther in the Deutsche Eishockey Liga (DEL).

== Playing career ==
Hakulinen made his Liiga debut playing with Lahti Pelicans during the 2014–15 Liiga season. In 2019–20 Liiga season, as the team's top players, he was Included helped KooKoo qualify for the playoffs for the first time in the club's history, but Hakulinen had to leave the end of the season after being injured.

Following three years with Lukko, serving as captain for his final two seasons, Hakulinen left the Finnish Liiga as a free agent and signed his first contract abroad in agreeing to a one-year contract with German club, Augsburger Panther of the DEL, on 15 June 2023.

== Personal life ==
Hakulinen's father Markku played over 200 SM-Liiga games and was also a member of the Finland men's national team at the Ice hockey at the Lake Placid Olympic Games in 1980. However, he died when Anrei was only eight months old. Anrei's uncles Yrjö Hakulinen and Raimo Ruusunen also played hockey at the SM-liiga level.
