= Jussi Tapio =

Finnish ice hockey player

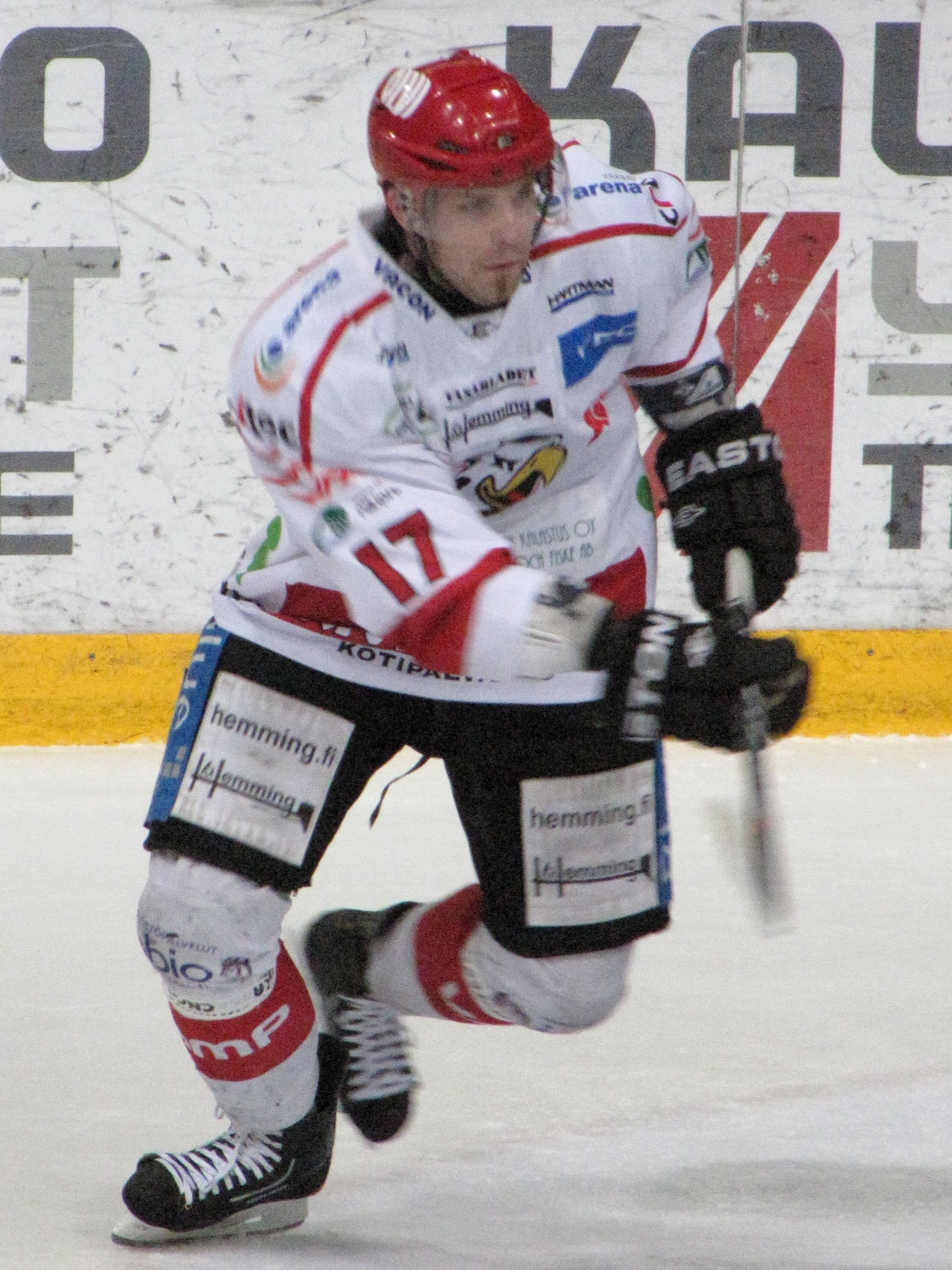
- Finnish ice hockey forward Jussi Tapio playing for Vaasa Sport in a Finnish SM-liiga relegation game in March, 2012.
- Born: April 10, 1986 (age 39) Turku, Finland
- Height: 5 ft 11 in (180 cm)
- Weight: 185 lb (84 kg; 13 st 3 lb)
- Position: Right wing
- Shot: Right
- Played for: Lukko; TPS; Aalborg Pirates; Odense Bulldogs; Ujpesti TE; Podhale Nowy Targ
- Playing career: 2006–2018

Jussi Tapio (born April 10, 1986) is a Finnish former professional ice hockey player.

Tapio played in the SM-liiga for Lukko and TPS.

== See also ==
- Ice hockey in Finland
