= SaiPa =

Ice hockey club from Lappeenranta, Finland

- City: Lappeenranta, Finland
- League: Liiga
- Founded: 1948
- Home arena: Kisapuisto (capacity: 4,820)
- Colours: Yellow, black
- CEO: Jani Valkeapää
- General manager: Harri Aho
- Head coach: Raimo Helminen
- Captain: Samuli Niinisaari
- Affiliates: Imatran Ketterä (Mestis)
- Website: saipa.fi
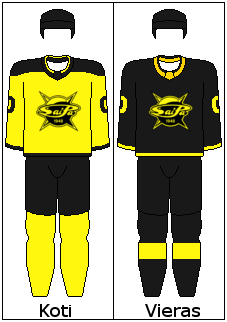

Saimaan Pallo (SaiPa) is an ice hockey team in the Finnish Liiga. They play their home games at Kisapuisto in Lappeenranta, Finland. SaiPa has many nicknames, such as "The Sputniks", "Sputnik", "Miracle of the East" and "Eastern Giant."

SaiPa play home games in the yellow shirt, black pants, yellow socks, and a black helmet. SaiPa play away games in mostly the same uniform as the home games, but also have a black version of the jersey.

== History ==
The team's best achievement is silver in the 2024–25 Liiga season. Previous best result was from the 1965–1966 season, when they won bronze medals for placing third. SaiPa also played in a bronze medal game in the 1998–1999 and 2013–14 seasons, but lost the games to HPK (7–2) and Lukko (3–2).

SaiPa has participated twice in the Champions Hockey League. During the 2014–2015 season, the team survived the quarterfinals, where they lost the return match against Oulun Kärpät. During the 2016–17 season, SaiPa won their initial games by 11 points. Eisbären Berlin and Luleå HF were the runners-up.

SaiPa has produced seven players who have played in the National Hockey League (NHL): Antti Aalto, Jussi Markkanen, Petteri Nokelainen, Petri Skriko, Jussi Timonen, Vesa Viitakoski, and Niklas Bäckström. Jussi Markkanen was a part owner of the club until may 2024.

== Honours ==
=== Domestic ===
Liiga

- (silver) 2nd place (1): 2024–25
- (bronze) 3rd place (1): 2025–26

SM-sarja

- (bronze) 3rd place (1): 1965–66

=== Pre-season ===
Finnish Cup

- (silver) Runners-up (3): 1958, 1965, 1971

== Players ==
=== Current roster ===
As of September 5, 2026.

No.	Nat	Player	Pos	S/G	Age	Acquired	Birthplace
31	(Latvia)	Gustavs Grigals	G	L	28	2025	Riga, Latvia
1	(Finland)	Ville-Veikko Hiltunen	G	L	20	2023	Lappeenranta, Finland
30	(Finland)	Kari Piiroinen	G	L	25	2023	Helsinki, Finland
22	(Finland)	Karri Aho	D	L	23	2023	Tampere, Finland
6	(Finland)	Santeri Airola	D	R	26	2023	Imatra, Finland
14	(United States)	Brian Kramer	D	L	26	2025	Wexford, PA, United States
7	(Finland)	Samuli Niinisaari (C)	D	L	28	2024	Hamina, Finland
2	(Canada)	Andrew Peski	D	R	29	2026	Orleans, ON, Canada
50	(Finland)	Saku Salminen (A)	D	L	26	2024	Tampere, Finland
17	(Finland)	Vertti Svensk	D	L	18	2025	Joensuu, Finland
55	(Czech Republic)	Ondřej Trejbal	D	L	27	2023	Nové Město na Moravě, Czech Republic
12	(Finland)	Samu Bau	F	L	22	2025	Helsinki, Finland
10	(Sweden)	Einar Emanuelsson	F	R	29	2026	Kiruna, Sweden
11	(Czech Republic)	Petr Fridrich	F	R	26	2026	Ostrava, Czech Republic
18	(Finland)	Juuso Heikkilä	F	L	26	2024	Haapavesi, Finland
57	(Finland)	Otto Hokkanen	F	L	22	2021	Lappeenranta, Finland
28	(Finland)	Aarne Intonen	F	L	25	2026	Lieto, Finland
81	(Finland)	Eero Klintrup	F	L	23	2024	Oulu, Finland
19	(Finland)	Veeti Moilanen	F	R	20	2025	Imatra, Finland
70	(Finland)	Janne Naukkarinen	F	L	22	2021	Lappeenranta, Finland
52	(Finland)	Petrus Palmu	F	L	29	2026	Joensuu, Finland
34	(Finland)	Mikko Perttu	F	L	25	2026	Järvenpää, Finland
38	(Finland)	Joonas Rajala	F	L	18	2026	Ylöjärvi, Finland
15	(Finland)	Miikka Salomäki (A)	F	L	33	2025	Raahe, Finland
75	(Finland)	Patrik Siikanen	F	L	26	2025	Espoo, Finland
62	(Finland)	Miro Tauslahti	F	L	22	2023	Joensuu, Finland
41	(Canada)	Nicholas Zabaneh	F	L	25	2026	Toronto, ON, Canada
92	(Slovenia)	Anze Zezelj	F	L	21	2025	Ljubljana, Slovenia

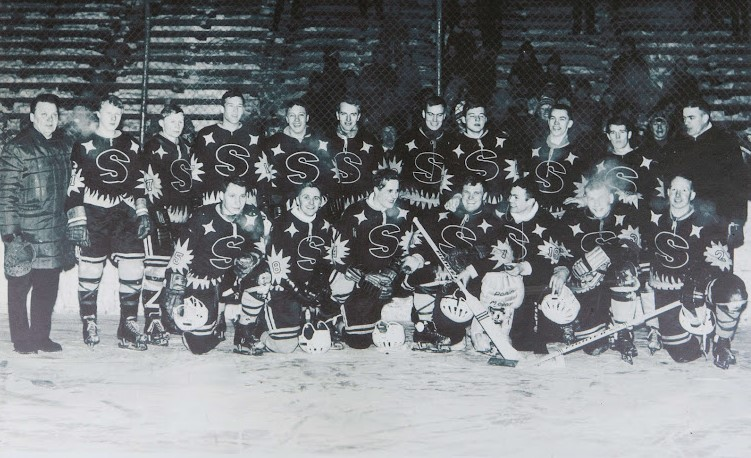
SaiPa's bronze medal team 1965–1966

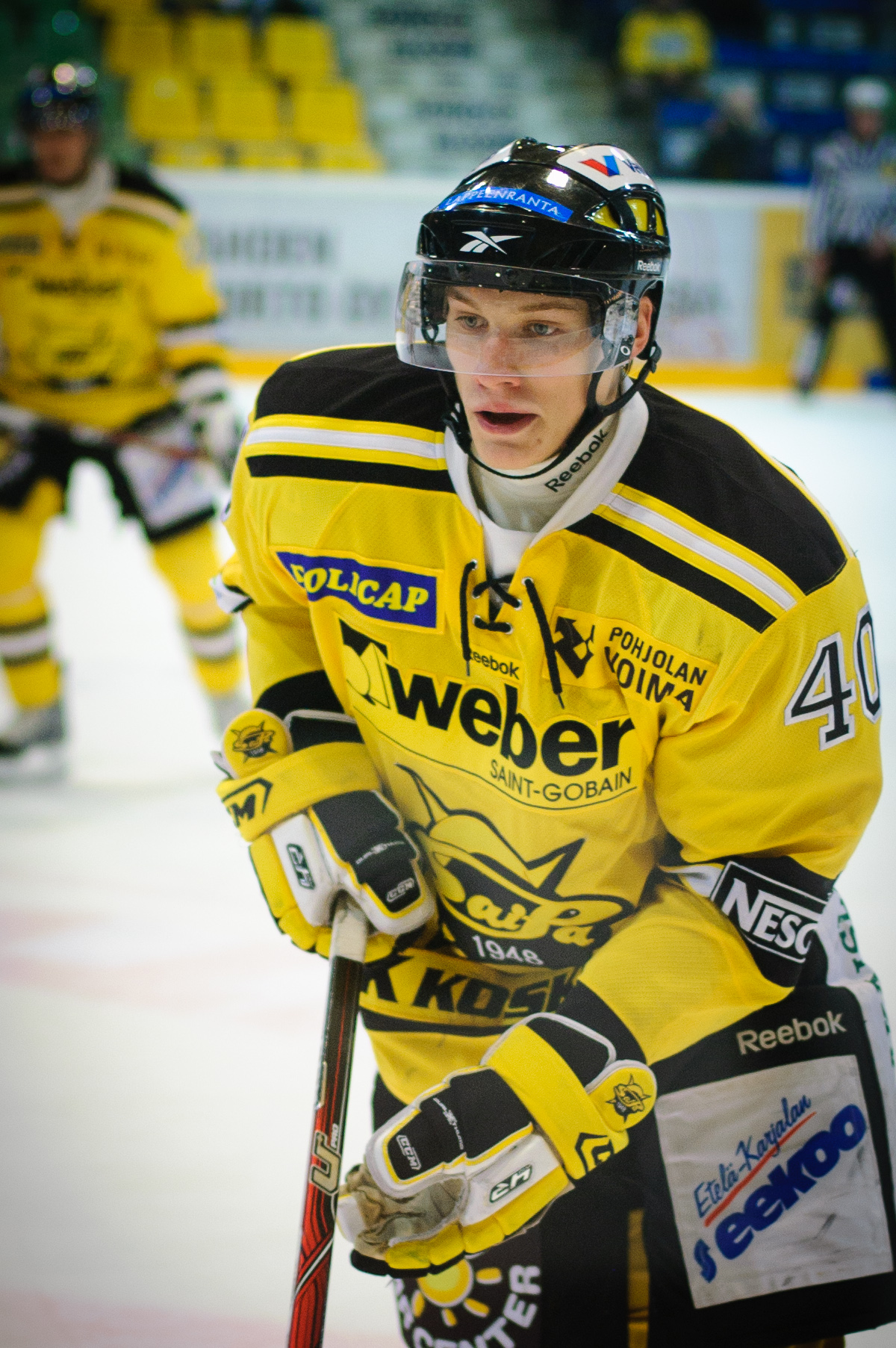
Jarno Koskiranta playing for SaiPa in 2010

=== Retired numbers ===
SaiPa retired numbers
No.	Player	Position	Career
3	Lalli Partinen	D	1959–1969
8	Ville Koho	C	2001–2020
9	Petri Skriko	LW	1979–1984
20	Heikki Mälkiä	C	1975–1986; 1988–1992

=== NHL alumni ===
- (Finland) Antti Aalto
- (Finland) Niklas Bäckström
- (Canada) Frank Banham
- (Slovakia) Richard Lintner
- (Finland) Jussi Markkanen
- (Canada) Dale McTavish
- (Finland) Jarmo Myllys
- (Finland) Petteri Nokelainen
- (Finland) Antti Pihlström
- (Czech Republic) Martin Richter
- (Finland) Petri Skriko
- (Finland) Jussi Timonen
- (Canada) Shayne Toporowski
- (Finland) Vesa Viitakoski
