= 2024–25 Liiga season =

Ice hockey season

2024–25 SM-liiga
- Liiga's 50th anniversary logo
- League: Liiga
- Sport: Ice hockey
- Defending champions: Tappara (2023–24)
- Duration: September 2024 – May 2025
- Games: 60
- Teams: 16
- TV partner(s): Telia; MTV Urheilu

Regular season
- Season champions: Lukko
- Runners-up: Ilves
- Season MVP: Atro Leppänen (Sport)
- Top scorer: Atro Leppänen (Sport)

Playoffs
- Playoffs MVP: Juuso Mäenpää
- Finals champions: KalPa
- Runners-up: SaiPa

Liiga seasons
- ← 2023–24 2025–26 →

The 2024–25 Liiga season was the 50th season of the Liiga, the top level of Finnish ice hockey since 1975.

The Liiga expanded to 16 teams for the season with the addition of Kiekko-Espoo. The league also brought back the relegation to the Mestis and a reformed playoff system and new divisions that decide the number of games teams play against each other.

== Format ==
The regular season started in September 2024. Due to the addition of Kiekko-Espoo, the previous number of 450 matches was increased to 480 matches total in the regular season. Each team played 60 matches, and all teams were divided into four groups.

As usual, the series was on break in November for a week and a half while the national teams played in the Euro Hockey Tour. The Christmas break lasted 5–7 days, depending on the team, with the exception of Kärpät, which participated on the 26th–31 December in the Spengler Cup in Switzerland. For other teams, the Christmas break ended on Saint Stephen's day, 26 December. Other one week break was in February 2025. The regular season ended in mid-March 2025.

Two outdoor games were played in Pori between the rivals Porin Ässät and Rauman Lukko in January 2025. The games went by the name Satakunnan Talviklassikko or The Satakunta Winter Classic. The games were counted as normal regular season games. They were played in the Amiko-areena, which is normally used by the bandy club Narukerä. Temporary stands with a capacity of 9,000 spectators were built for the two games.

== Teams ==
Location of teams in 2024–25 SM-liiga

Team	City	Head coach	Arena	Capacity	Captain
HIFK	Helsinki	Ville Peltonen	Helsingin jäähalli	8,200	Ilari Melart
HPK	Hämeenlinna	~~Matias Lehtonen~~ 23 Sep 2024; Mikko Manner	Pohjantähti Areena	5,360	Petteri Nikkilä
Ilves	Tampere	Tommi Niemelä	Nokia Arena	12,700	Niklas Friman
Jukurit	Mikkeli	~~Marko Tuomainen~~ 14 Jan 2025; Jonne Virtanen	Ikioma Areena	4,200	Jesper Piitulainen
JYP	Jyväskylä	Johan Pennerborn	LähiTapiola Areena	4,437	Teemu Eronen
KalPa	Kuopio	Petri Karjalainen	Olvi Areena	5,300	Tuomas Kiiskinen
Kiekko-Espoo	Espoo	Jyrki Aho	Espoo Metro Areena	6,982	Ville Lajunen
KooKoo	Kouvola	Jouko Myrrä	Lumon Areena	5,950	Otto Paajanen
Kärpät	Oulu	~~Ville Mäntymaa~~ 3 Mar 2025; Petri Matikainen	Oulun Energia Areena	6,300	Marko Anttila
Lukko	Rauma	Tomi Lämsä	Kivikylän Areena	4,500	Sebastian Repo
Pelicans	Lahti	~~Juhamatti Yli-Junnila~~ 20 Jan 2025; Sami Kapanen	Isku Areena	4,403	Miika Roine
SaiPa	Lappeenranta	Raimo Helminen	Lappeenrannan jäähalli	4,820	Ville Petman
Sport	Vaasa	Juuso Hahl	Vaasan Sähkö Areena	5,185	Sebastian Stålberg
Tappara	Tampere	Rikard Grönborg	Nokia Arena	12,700	Otto Rauhala
TPS	Turku	Tommi Miettinen	Gatorade Center	10,500	Casimir Jürgens
Ässät	Pori	Jarno Pikkarainen	Enersense Areena	6,150	Jan-Mikael Järvinen

== Regular season standings ==
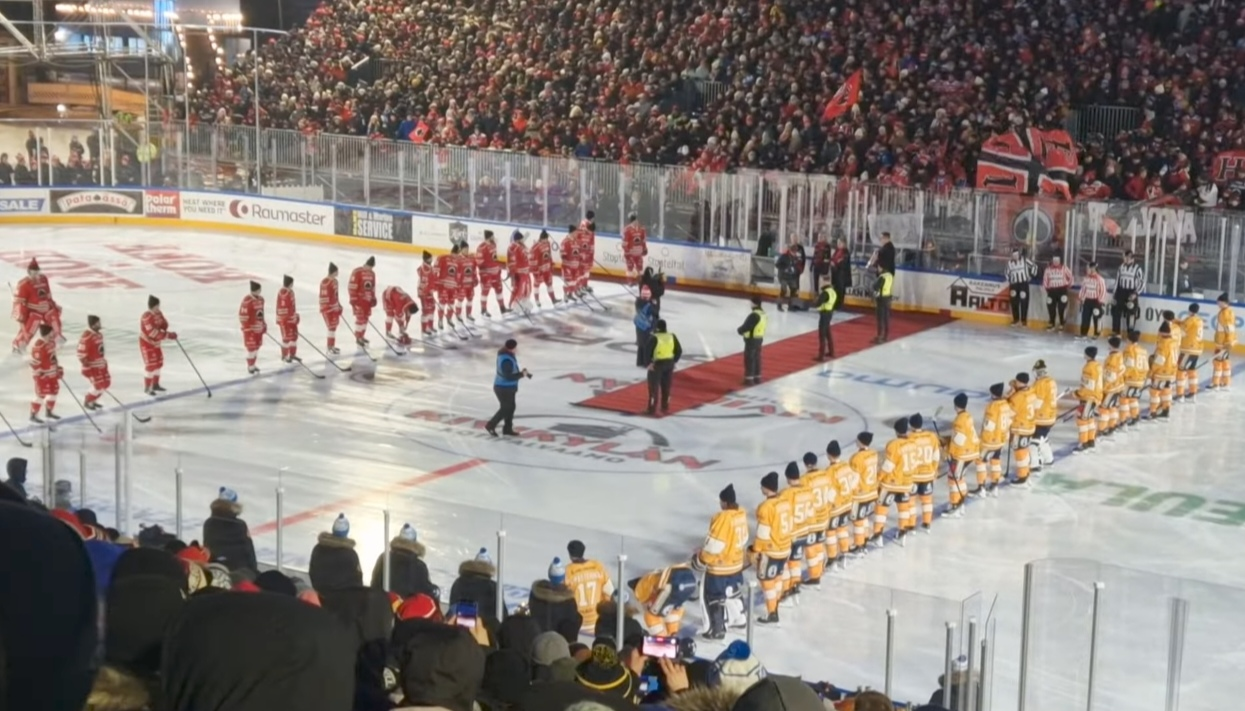
Satakunta WInter Classic 2025

Top four advance straight to the quarter-finals, while teams between 5th and 12th positions play a wild card round for the final four spots. The 15th and 16th placed teams play against each other to decide which team will play against the Mestis champion for a spot in the SM-liiga. (Note: If a Mestis team wins the qualification round, it can still be denied promotion if the team does not match SM-liiga's qualification criteria) The top two teams of the regular season and playoff champion qualified for the Champions Hockey League and the third team to the Spengler Cup.

Pos	Team	Pld	W	OTW	OTL	L	GF	GA	GD	Pts	Final Result
1	Lukko	60	32	6	4	18	202	147	+55	112	Advance to Playoffs, Regular season winners and Champions Hockey League
2	Ilves	60	32	4	7	17	176	145	+31	111	Advance to Playoffs and Champions Hockey League
3	KalPa (C)	60	29	7	6	18	196	149	+47	107	Advance to Quarterfinals
4	HIFK (S)	60	27	9	8	16	173	165	+8	107	Advance to Quarterfinals
5	SaiPa	60	30	6	4	20	178	170	+8	106	Advance to Wild-card round
6	KooKoo	60	23	13	4	20	206	169	+37	99	Advance to Wild-card round
7	Ässät	60	26	4	9	21	160	159	+1	95	Advance to Wild-card round
8	Kiekko-Espoo	60	20	10	11	19	160	171	−11	91	Advance to Wild-card round
9	Tappara	60	24	6	6	24	178	168	+10	90	Advance to Wild-card round
10	HPK	60	21	5	10	24	154	178	−24	83	Advance to Wild-card round
11	Sport	60	17	9	14	20	172	177	−5	83	Advance to Wild-card round
12	TPS	60	18	9	7	26	173	190	−17	79	Advance to Wild-card round
13	Kärpät	60	19	7	6	28	172	193	−21	77	
14	JYP	60	19	6	7	28	167	197	−30	76	
15	Pelicans	60	20	4	7	29	171	179	−8	75	Advance to Playout round
16	Jukurit	60	12	6	1	41	134	215	−81	49	Advance to Playout round

(C) Play-off Champions and Champions Hockey League; (S) Spengler Cup
1. With KalPA finishing third and winning the 2024–25 Liiga, Spengler Cup spot went to next best club 2024–25 Liiga standings not qualified for CHL, HIFK Hockey

== Broadcast rights ==
For the 2023–2024 season, Telia had transferred the television rights of the SM-liiga to MTV, which it owns. Telia had acquired the broadcast rights starting from the 2018–2019 season, and with the new agreement MTV has the rights until the end of the 2026–2027 season. MTV pays more than 90 million euros for television rights over four seasons, and the company has admitted that the operation is loss-making. The broadcasts are produced by MTV and during the season games can be seen live from C More, Discovery+, DNA, Elisa Viihde, MTV and Telia.

== Playoffs ==
=== Playoff bracket ===
First round (best-of-5)
5	SaiPa	3
12	TPS	2
6	KooKoo	1
11	Sport	3
7	Ässät	3
10	HPK	0
8	K-Espoo	2
9	Tappara	3

Quarter-finals (best-of-7)
1	Lukko	4
11	Sport	0
2	Ilves	4
9	Tappara	0
3	KalPa	4
7	Ässät	3
4	HIFK	0
5	SaiPa	4

Semi-finals (best-of-7)
1	Lukko	2
5	SaiPa	4
(Pairings are re-seeded after the first and second round)
2	Ilves	2
3	KalPa	4

Finals (best-of-7)
3	KalPa	4
5	SaiPa	2
Bronze medal game
1	Lukko	4
2	Ilves	5

=== First round ===
==== (5) SaiPa vs. (12) TPS ====
18 March	SaiPa	1–2	TPS	Lappeenrannan jäähalli	Recap
Janne Naukkarinen (1) – 12:03		First period	3:56 – Otto Salin (1; PPG)
No scoring		Second period	18:38 – Otto Salin (2)
No scoring		Third period	No scoring
Kari Piiroinen (11 shots / 9 saves)		Goalie stats	Noa Vali (38 shots / 37 saves)

19 March	TPS	6–2	SaiPa	Gatorade Center	Recap
Eetu Päkkilä (1) – 3:27		First period	2:16 – Mark Pysyk (1)
Lukas Wernblom (1) – 2:59; Leevi Teissala (1) – 3:45; Casimir Jürgens (1) – 7:07; Topias Haapanen (1) – 18:08		Second period	12:52 – Ville Petman (1; PPG)
Eetu Päkkilä (2, ENG) – 17:16		Third period	No scoring
Veini Vehviläinen (44 shots / 42 saves)		Goalie stats	Kari Piiroinen (23 shots / 18 saves)

21 March	SaiPa	3–0	TPS	Lappeenrannan jäähalli	Recap
Antti Kalapudas (1; PPG) – 4:19; Samuli Niinisaari (1) – 19:14		First period	No scoring
No scoring		Second period	No scoring
Mark Pysyk (2, ENG) – 17:44		Third period	No scoring
Kari Piiroinen (29 shots / 29 saves)		Goalie stats	Noa Vali (25 shots / 23 saves)

22 March	TPS	1–2	SaiPa	Gatorade Center	Recap
No scoring		First period	No scoring
Aarne Talvitie (1) – 17:02		Second period	6:27 – Santeri Airola (1; PPG); 19:39 – Mikko Petman (1)
No scoring		Third period	No scoring
Noa Vali (21 shots / 19 saves)		Goalie stats	Kari Piiroinen (23 shots / 22 saves)

24 March	SaiPa	3–2	OT	TPS	Lappeenrannan jäähalli	Recap
Juuso Heikkilä (1) – 2:57		First period		3:50 – Viljami Marjala (1)
Mikko Petman (2) – 7:36		Second period		12:52 – Viljami Marjala (2)
No scoring		Third period		No scoring
Ville Petman (2) – 13:39		First overtime period		No scoring
Kari Piiroinen (15 shots / 13 saves)		Goalie stats		Noa Vali (35 shots / 32 saves)

SaiPa win series 3–2

==== (6) KooKoo vs. (11) Sport ====
18 March	KooKoo	1–3	Sport	Lumon Areena	Recap
No scoring		First period	No scoring
Jimi Suomi (1) – 5:38		Second period	10:28 – Viljami Nieminen (1; PPG); 15:15 – Simon Hjalmarsson (1)
No scoring		Third period	3:00 – Cole Fonstad (1)
Antoine Bibeau (19 shots / 16 saves)		Goalie stats	Masi Härkönen (22 shots / 21 saves)

19 March	Sport	0–3	KooKoo	Vaasan Sähkö Areena	Recap
No scoring		First period	16:52 – Teemu Engberg (1)
No scoring		Second period	13:20 – Vilmos Galló (1)
No scoring		Third period	18:45 – Saku Salmela (1, ENG)
Masi Härkönen (38 shots / 36 saves)		Goalie stats	Eetu Randelin (23 shots / 23 saves)

21 March	KooKoo	1–2	Sport	Lumon Areena	Recap
Seth Barton (1) – 0:50		First period	No scoring
No scoring		Second period	6:10 – Lari Heikkinen (1)
No scoring		Third period	6:38 – Cole Fonstad (2)
Eetu Randelin (14 shots / 12 saves)		Goalie stats	Masi Härkönen (27 shots / 26 saves)

22 March	Sport	4–2	KooKoo	Vaasan Sähkö Areena	Recap
Linus Andersson (1) – 6:15		First period	No scoring
No scoring		Second period	10:07 – Matic Török (1)
Sebastian Stålberg (1) – 6:47; Viljami Nieminen (2) – 16:40; Carl Mattsson (1; ENG) – 19:28		Third period	14:08 – Vilmos Galló (1)
Masi Härkönen (17 shots / 15 saves)		Goalie stats	Eetu Randelin (25 shots / 22 saves)

Sport win series 3–1

==== (7) Ässät vs. (10) HPK ====
18 March	Ässät	3–2	HPK	Enersense Areena	Recap
Jonne Tammela (1) – 7:49		First period	15:58 – Petteri Nikkilä (1)
Roope Talaja (1) – 12:56; Valtteri Viljanen (1; PPG) – 19:02		Second period	15:17 – Miska Kukkonen (1)
No scoring		Third period	No scoring
Niklas Rubin (20 shots / 18 saves)		Goalie stats	Kim Saarinen (30 shots / 27 saves)

19 March	HPK	1–2	OT	Ässät	Pohjantähti Areena	Recap
Eetu Tuulola (1; PPG) – 17:59		First period		No scoring
No scoring		Second period		No scoring
No scoring		Third period		9:23 – Dylan Fabre (1; PPG)
No scoring		First overtime period		1:05 – Kasperi Ojantakanen (1)
Kim Saarinen (24 shots / 22 saves)		Goalie stats		Niklas Rubin (23 shots / 22 saves)

21 March	Ässät	5–1	HPK	Enersense Areena	Recap
Nestor Noiva (1) – 12:19		First period	No scoring
Valtteri Viljanen (2) – 10:22; Jan-Mikael Järvinen (1, PPG) – 13:46		Second period	No scoring
Nestor Noiva (2; DP) – 7:38; Rami Määttä (1, ENG) – 15:30		Third period	14:51 – Sami Päivärinta (1)
Niklas Rubin (27 shots / 26 saves)		Goalie stats	Kim Saarinen (25 shots / 21 saves)

Ässät win series 3–0

==== (8) Kiekko-Espoo vs. (9) Tappara ====
18 March	Kiekko-Espoo	1–0	Tappara	Espoo Metro Areena	Recap
Arttu Tuomaala (1) – 8:38		First period	No scoring
No scoring		Second period	No scoring
No scoring		Third period	No scoring
Petteri Rimpinen (31 shots / 31 saves)		Goalie stats	Filip Lindberg (18 shots / 17 saves)

19 March	Tappara	6–1	Kiekko-Espoo	Nokia Arena	Recap
Mario Kempe (1) – 10:55		First period	No scoring
Benjamin Rautiainen (1; PPG) – 1:49; Petteri Puhakka (1) – 3:09; Mario Kempe (2; PPG) – 9:00		Second period	No scoring
Otto Rauhala (1) – 2:10; Petteri Puhakka (2, PPG) – 17:48		Third period	13:33 – Aleksi Laakso (1)
Filip Lindberg (25 shots / 24 saves)		Goalie stats	Petteri Rimpinen (28 shots / 23 saves); Sami Rajaniemi (4 shots / 3 saves)

21 March	Kiekko-Espoo	5–2	Tappara	Espoo Metro Areena	Recap
Heikki Liedes (1; PPG) – 6:20; Santeri Virtanen (1; PPG) – 10:08; Tobias Ekberg (1) – 11:25		First period	No scoring
No scoring		Second period	7:00 – Philip Granath (1); 17:07 – Julius Mattila (1)
Peter Quenneville (1; PPG) – 16:32; Heikki Liedes (2; ENG) – 18:37		Third period	No scoring
Petteri Rimpinen (35 shots / 33 saves)		Goalie stats	Filip Lindberg (12 shots / 8 saves)

22 March	Tappara	2–1	Kiekko-Espoo	Nokia Arena	Recap
No scoring		First period	No scoring
Daniel Brickley (1) – 5:08		Second period	13:33 – Peter Quenneville (2; PPG)
Benjamin Rautiainen (2) – 3:18		Third period	No scoring
Filip Lindberg (24 shots / 23 saves)		Goalie stats	Petteri Rimpinen (27 shots / 25 saves)

24 March	Kiekko-Espoo	3–4	OT	Tappara	Espoo Metro Areena	Recap
Heikki Liedes (3; PPG) – 11:59; Santeri Virtanen (2) – 18:22		First period		16:25 – Aleksi Matinmikko (1)
Peter Quenneville (3) – 7:52		Second period		No scoring
No scoring		Third period		9:15 – Jonathan Andersson (1); 18:04 – Julius Mattila (2; PPG)
No scoring		First overtime period		7:30 – Otto Rauhala (2; SHG)
Petteri Rimpinen (41 shots / 37 saves)		Goalie stats		Filip Lindberg (22 shots / 19 saves)

Tappara win series 3–2

=== Quarter-finals ===
==== (1) Lukko vs. (11) Sport ====
26 March	Lukko	6–2	Sport	Kivikylän Areena	Recap
Henri Ikonen (1) – 16:27		First period	No scoring
Patrick Khodorenko (1) – 9:28; Alex Peters (1) – 19:08		Second period	0:56 – Sebastian Wännström (1)
Steven Jandric (1; 2PPG) – 1:30; Patrick Khodorenko (2; PPG) – 5:29; Ponthus Westerholm (1) – 15:06		Third period	15:45 – Sebastian Stålberg (2)
John Lethermon (17 shots / 15 saves)		Goalie stats	Masi Härkönen (36 shots / 30 saves)

27 March	Sport	1–4	Lukko	Vaasan Sähkö Areena	Recap
Sebastian Wännström (2; PPG) – 10:10		First period	5:30 – Harri Kainulainen (1); 7:23 – Antoine Morand (1)
No scoring		Second period	4:17 – Henri Ikonen (2)
No scoring		Third period	17:18 – Jami Krannila (1; ENG)
Masi Härkönen (18 shots / 15 saves)		Goalie stats	Joni Ortio (19 shots / 18 saves)

31 March	Lukko	5–1	Sport	Kivikylän Areena	Recap
Jakob Stenqvist (1; PPG) – 9:16; Steven Jandric (2) – 17:59		First period	18:26 – Linus Andersson (2)
Antoine Morand (2) – 17:05		Second period	No scoring
Lenni Hämäläinen (1) – 12:50; Henri Ikonen (3) – 17:58		Third period	No scoring
John Lethermon (18 shots / 17 saves)		Goalie stats	Masi Härkönen (21 shots / 16 saves)

2 April	Sport	1–3	Lukko	Vaasan Sähkö Areena	Recap
No scoring		First period	17:43 – Éric Gélinas (1)
No scoring		Second period	5:16 – Niclas Almari (1); 16:53 – Steven Jandric (3)
Theodor Johnsson (1) – 2:30		Third period	No scoring
Masi Härkönen (13 shots / 10 saves); Daniel Lebedeff (8 shots / 8 saves)		Goalie stats	Joni Ortio (13 shots / 12 saves)

Lukko win series 4–0

==== (2) Ilves vs. (9) Tappara ====
26 March	Ilves	4–0	Tappara	Nokia Arena	Recap
No scoring		First period	No scoring
Jens Lööke (1) – 3:52; Carl Klingberg (1) – 18:18; Ville Meskanen (1; PPG) – 19:10; Lukas Svejkovsky (1; PPG) – 19:33		Second period	No scoring
No scoring		Third period	No scoring
Dominik Pavlát (27 shots / 27 saves)		Goalie stats	Filip Lindberg (17 shots / 13 saves); Juha Metsola (7 shots / 7 saves)

28 March	Tappara	1–2	Ilves	Nokia Arena	Recap
No scoring		First period	No scoring
No scoring		Second period	16:01 – Samu Bau (1)
Veli-Matti Savinainen (1; PPG) – 15:36		Third period	17:23 – Adam Najman (1)
Juha Metsola (25 shots / 23 saves)		Goalie stats	Dominik Pavlát (26 shots / 25 saves)

31 March	Ilves	3–2	Tappara	Nokia Arena	Recap
Jarkko Parikka (1) – 9:21		First period	No scoring
John Nyberg (1) – 4:03		Second period	8:12 – Olli Juolevi (1)
Lukas Svejkovsky (2) – 1:44		Third period	16:22 – Aapeli Räsänen (1; PPG; ENG)
Dominik Pavlát (24 shots / 22 saves)		Goalie stats	Filip Lindberg (20 shots / 17 saves)

2 April	Tappara	1–6	Ilves	Nokia Arena	Recap
No scoring		First period	No scoring
Julius Mattila (3; PPG) – 5:40		Second period	17:07 – Simon Johansson (1); 17:15 – Ville Meskanen (2)
No scoring		Third period	7:01 – Samuli Ratinen (1); 8:59 – Matias Mäntykivi (1; PPG); 10:21 – Samuli Ratinen (2); 11:26 – Samuli Ratinen (3; PPG)
Juha Metsola (20 shots / 14 saves); Filip Lindberg (3 shots / 3 saves)		Goalie stats	Dominik Pavlát (25 shots / 24 saves)

Ilves win series 4–0

==== (3) KalPa vs. (7) Ässät ====
26 March	KalPa	1–2	OT	Ässät	Olvi Areena	Recap
No scoring		First period		No scoring
Patrick Curry (1; PPG) – 9:46		Second period		7:22 – Kasper Puutio (1; 2PPG)
No scoring		Third period		No scoring
No scoring		First overtime period		8:59 – Jan-Mikael Järvinen (2)
Stefanos Lekkas (26 shots / 24 saves)		Goalie stats		Niklas Rubin (26 shots / 25 saves)

28 March	Ässät	1–3	KalPa	Enersense Areena	Recap
Lenni Hämeenaho (1) – 15:31		First period	12:38 – Jaakko Rissanen (1)
No scoring		Second period	17:10 – Lasse Lappalainen (1; PPG); 19:20 – Aleksi Klemetti (1; PPG)
No scoring		Third period	No scoring
Niklas Rubin (16 shots / 13 saves)		Goalie stats	Stefanos Lekkas (29 shots / 28 saves)

31 March	KalPa	4–1	Ässät	Olvi Areena	Recap
Juuso Mäenpää (1) – 0:19; Patrick Curry (2; PPG) – 11:05		First period	No scoring
Tuomas Salmela (1) – 7:14		Second period	5:09 – Roope Talaja (2; PPG)
Juuso Mäenpää (2) – 3:27		Third period	No scoring
Stefanos Lekkas (22 shots / 21 saves)		Goalie stats	Niklas Rubin (38 shots / 34 saves)

2 April	Ässät	1–2	OT	KalPa	Enersense Areena	Recap
Patrik Juhola (1) – 3:55		First period		No scoring
No scoring		Second period		14:15 – Patrick Curry (3; 2PPG)
No scoring		Third period		No scoring
No scoring		First overtime period		3:58 – Jere Karjalainen (1)
Niklas Rubin (29 shots / 27 saves)		Goalie stats		Stefanos Lekkas (27 shots / 26 saves)

4 April	KalPa	0–2	Ässät	Olvi Areena	Recap
No scoring		First period	18:29 – Peter Tiivola (1)
No scoring		Second period	No scoring
No scoring		Third period	19:58 – Eemil Erholtz (1; ENG)
Stefanos Lekkas (22 shots / 21 saves)		Goalie stats	Niklas Rubin (19 shots / 19 saves)

7 April	Ässät	5–0	KalPa	Enersense Areena	Recap
7:28 – Aleksi Anttalainen (1); 14:12 – Dylan Fabre (2); 15:55 – Valtteri Viljanen (3; PPG)		First period	No scoring
14:12 – Eemil Erholtz (2)		Second period	No scoring
18:57 – Nestor Noiva (3)		Third period	No scoring
Niklas Rubin (21 shots / 21 saves)		Goalie stats	Stefanos Lekkas (17 shots / 13 saves); Juha Jatkola (4 shots / 3 saves)

9 April	KalPa	3–2	Ässät	Olvi Areena	Recap
Konsta Kapanen (1) – 5:55		First period	No scoring
Benjamin Korhonen (1) – 13:05; Juuso Mäenpää (3) – 14:34		Second period	No scoring
No scoring		Third period	5:39 – Kasperi Ojantakanen (2); 8:54 – Roope Talaja (3; PPG)
Stefanos Lekkas (23 shots / 21 saves)		Goalie stats	Niklas Rubin (28 shots / 25 saves)

Kalpa win series 4–3

==== (4) HIFK vs. (5) SaiPa ====
If the series had gone past game 4, the order of games 5 and 6 where switched due to ISU World Synchronized Skating Championships being held in Helsingin jäähalli on 4 and 5 April.

26 March	HIFK	1–4	SaiPa	Helsingin jäähalli	Recap
No scoring		First period	11:15 – Henri Nikkanen (1)
No scoring		Second period	5:39 – Santeri Airola (2)
Daniel Mäkiaho (1) – 4:46		Third period	15:59 – Antti Kalapudas (2; 2PPG); 18:18 – Otto Kivenmäki (1; ENG)
Niko Hovinen (23 shots / 20 saves)		Goalie stats	Kari Piiroinen (24 shots / 23 saves)

28 March	SaiPa	2–1	OT	HIFK	Lappeenrannan jäähalli	Recap
Eero Klintrup (1) – 8:04		First period		4:37 – Petrus Palmu (1; PPG)
No scoring		Second period		No scoring
No scoring		Third period		No scoring
Niklas Appelgren (1) – 2:34		First overtime period		No scoring
Kari Piiroinen (23 shots / 22 saves)		Goalie stats		Niko Hovinen (28 shots / 26 saves)

29 March	HIFK	0–2	SaiPa	Helsingin jäähalli	Recap
No scoring		First period	1:20 – Mikko Petman (3); 3:28 – Roni Karvinen (1; PPG)
No scoring		Second period	No scoring
No scoring		Third period	No scoring
Niko Hovinen (18 shots / 16 saves)		Goalie stats	Kari Piiroinen (22 shots / 22 saves)

2 April	SaiPa	6–2	HIFK	Lappeenrannan jäähalli	Recap
No scoring		First period	2:34 – Micke-Max Åsten (1)
Roni Karvinen (2; PPG) – 1:38; Mikko Petman (4) – 11:05; Ville Petman (3; PPG) – 11:44; Eero Klintrup (2; SHG) – 16:01		Second period	18:05 – Vincent Marleau (1)
Miska Siikonen (1) – 10:30; Otto Hokkanen (1; ENG) – 18:23		Third period	No scoring
Kari Piiroinen (28 shots / 26 saves)		Goalie stats	Niko Hovinen (24 shots / 19 saves)

SaiPa win series 4–0

=== Semi-finals ===
==== (1) Lukko vs. (5) SaiPa ====
11 April	Lukko	1–2	SaiPa	Kivikylän Areena	Recap
No scoring		First period	5:35 – Juuso Heikkilä (2)
No scoring		Second period	No scoring
Antti Saarela (1; PPG) – 14:08		Third period	18:51 – Otto Kivenmäki (2)
John Lethermon (18 shots / 16 saves)		Goalie stats	Kari Piiroinen (28 shots / 27 saves)

12 April	SaiPa	3–5	Lukko	Lappeenrannan jäähalli	Recap
Mikko Petman (5) – 3:27		First period	5:12 – Antti Saarela (2); 17:40 – Henri Ikonen (4)
Eero Klintrup (3; PS) – 1:45; Antti Kalapudas (3) – 3:26		Second period	3:34 – Antoine Morand (3)
No scoring		Third period	3:34 – Linus Nyman (1); 19:08 – Jami Krannila (2; ENG)
Kari Piiroinen (31 shots / 27 saves)		Goalie stats	Joni Ortio (24 shots / 21 saves)

14 April	Lukko	1–2	2OT	SaiPa	Kivikylän Areena	Recap
No scoring		First period		No scoring
No scoring		Second period		No scoring
Steven Jandric (4; PPG) – 1:29		Third period		6:24 – Miro Tauslahti (1)
No scoring		Second overtime period		12:23 – Otto Kivenmäki (3)
Joni Ortio (33 shots / 31 saves)		Goalie stats		Kari Piiroinen (46 shots / 45 saves)

16 April	SaiPa	5–2	Lukko	Lappeenrannan jäähalli	Recap
Mikko Petman (6) – 3:58		First period	No scoring
Mikko Kousa (1) – 18:07		Second period	8:49 – Niklas Ylitalo (1)
Antti Kalapudas (4; 2PPG) – 1:26; Juuso Heikkilä (3; PPG) – 10:59; Eero Klintrup (4; SH; ENG) – 16:54		Third period	5:05 – Pathrik Westerholm (1)
Kari Piiroinen (31 shots / 29 saves)		Goalie stats	John Lethermon (25 shots / 21 saves)

18 April	Lukko	3–2	OT	SaiPa	Kivikylän Areena	Recap
No scoring		First period		17:16 – Miska Siikonen (2)
Henri Ikonen (5) – 8:12		Second period		No scoring
Éric Gélinas (2; EA) – 18:09		Third period		9:16 – Juuso Heikkilä (4)
Karson Kuhlman (1) – 3:07		First overtime period		No scoring
Joni Ortio (21 shots / 19 saves)		Goalie stats		Kari Piiroinen (27 shots / 24 saves)

21 April	SaiPa	2–1	OT	Lukko	Lappeenrannan jäähalli	Recap
No scoring		First period		No scoring
Santeri Airola (3) – 9:08		Second period		18:15 – Henri Ikonen (6)
No scoring		Third period		No scoring
Santeri Airola (4) – 0:59		First overtime period		No scoring
Kari Piiroinen (28 shots / 27 saves)		Goalie stats		Joni Ortio (19 shots / 17 saves)

SaiPa win series 4–2

==== (2) Ilves vs. (3) KalPa ====
11 April	Ilves	2–3	KalPa	Nokia Arena	Recap
No scoring		First period	No scoring
Lukáš Švejkovský (3) – 2:10; Kasper Björkqvist (1) – 5:36		Second period	16:15 – Jesper Mattila (1)
No scoring		Third period	10:07 – Aleksi Elorinne (1); 17:19 – Matyas Kantner (1)
Dominik Pavlát (26 shots / 23 saves)		Goalie stats	Stefanos Lekkas (28 shots / 26 saves)

12 April	KalPa	3–2	OT	Ilves	Olvi Areena	Recap
No scoring		First period		13:47 – Matias Mäntykivi (2)
Juuso Mäenpää (4) – 5:52; Jesper Mattila (2) – 16:59		Second period		8:08 – Carl Klingberg (2; PPG)
No scoring		Third period		No scoring
Aleksi Elorinne (2) – 9:05		First overtime period		No scoring
Juha Jatkola (32 shots / 30 saves)		Goalie stats		Dominik Pavlát (31 shots / 28 saves)

14 April	Ilves	3–0	KalPa	Nokia Arena	Recap
Jens Lööke (2; PPG) – 9:49; Ville Meskanen (3; PPG) – 11:22		First period	No scoring
No scoring		Second period	No scoring
Juuso Könönen (1) – 5:14		Third period	No scoring
Dominik Pavlát (19 shots / 19 saves)		Goalie stats	Stefanos Lekkas (32 shots / 29 saves)

16 April	KalPa	1–0	Ilves	Olvi Areena	Recap
No scoring		First period	No scoring
No scoring		Second period	No scoring
Matyas Kantner (2) – 3:47		Third period	No scoring
Stefanos Lekkas (24 shots / 24 saves)		Goalie stats	Dominik Pavlát (12 shots / 11 saves)

18 April	Ilves	3–1	KalPa	Nokia Arena	Recap
No scoring		First period	7:35 – Jere Karjalainen (2)
Eemeli Suomi (1; PPG) – 1:46; Arttu Pelli (1; PPG) – 11:53		Second period	No scoring
Joonas Nättinen (1; ENG; PPG) – 19:45		Third period	No scoring
Dominik Pavlát (24 shots / 23 saves)		Goalie stats	Stefanos Lekkas (21 shots / 19 saves)

21 April	KalPa	5–4	OT	Ilves	Olvi Areena	Recap
Jere Karjalainen (3) – 3:03; Patrick Curry (4) – 15:30		First period		1:47 – Toni Utunen (1)
Matyas Kantner (3) – 0:28; Patrick Curry (5; PPG) – 8:34		Second period		3:58 – Joonas Nättinen (2)
No scoring		Third period		10:17 – Simon Johansson (2); 12:19 – Carl Klingberg (3; PPG)
Juuso Mäenpää (5; PPG) – 10:57		First overtime period		No scoring
Stefanos Lekkas (32 shots / 28 saves)		Goalie stats		Dominik Pavlát (25 shots / 20 saves)

KalPa win series 4–2

=== Bronze medal game ===
25 April	Lukko	4–5	OT	Ilves	Kivikylän Areena	Recap
Ponthus Westerholm (2) – 2:50		First period		0:59 – Carl Klingberg (4)
Jakob Stenqvist (2; PPG) – 7:08		Second period		6:22 – Carl Klingberg (5); 8:25 – John Nyberg (2)
Harri Kainulainen (2; PPG) – 5:18; Ponthus Westerholm (3) – 11:39		Third period		8:05 – Ville Meskanen (4)
No scoring		First overtime period		3:16 – Ville Meskanen (5; PPG)
Joni Ortio (27 shots / 22 saves)		Goalie stats		Jakub Málek (29 shots / 25 saves)

Ilves win the bronze

=== Finals ===
25 April	KalPa	2–6	SaiPa	Olvi Areena	Recap
No scoring		First period	No scoring
Lasse Lappalainen (2) – 9:37		Second period	16:23 – Juuso Heikkilä (5); 16:39 – Antti Kalapudas (5)
Matyas Kantner (4; PPG) – 12:32		Third period	2:21 – Juuso Heikkilä (6); 3:55 – Juuso Heikkilä (7; PPG); 13:10 – Ville Petman (4; DP); 14:49 – Antti Kalapudas (6; ENG)
Stefanos Lekkas (30 shots / 25 saves)		Goalie stats	Kari Piiroinen (33 shots / 31 saves)

26 April	SaiPa	2–5	KalPa	Lappeenrannan jäähalli	Recap
No scoring		First period	17:20 – Andreas Okany (1)
No scoring		Second period	9:14 – Lasse Lappalainen (3)
Henri Nikkanen (2) – 5:38; Antti Kalapudas (7; PPG) – 10:55		Third period	3:28 – Kristjan Kombe (1); 9:48 – Aleksi Klemetti (2); 17:53 – Patrick Curry (6; ENG)
Kari Piiroinen (17 shots / 13 saves)		Goalie stats	Stefanos Lekkas (22 shots / 20 saves)

28 April	KalPa	8–1	SaiPa	Olvi Areena	Recap
Juuso Mäenpää (6) – 0:39; Jere Karjalainen (4) – 1:07; Ville Ruotsalainen (1) – 1:33; Jesper Mattila (3) – 2:22; Lasse Lappalainen (4) – 18:40		First period	No scoring
Jesper Mattila (4) – 13:22		Second period	8:42 – Saku Salminen (1)
Kristjan Kombe (2; PPG) – 4:00; Kristjan Kombe (3; PPG) – 18:15		Third period	No scoring
Stefanos Lekkas (24 shots / 23 saves)		Goalie stats	Kari Piiroinen (3 shots / 0 saves); Michael Hutchinson (20 shots / 15 saves)

30 April	SaiPa	0–2	KalPa	Lappeenrannan jäähalli	Recap
No scoring		First period	No scoring
No scoring		Second period	6:37 – Kasper Simontaival (1; PPG); 14:52 – Kasper Simontaival (2)
No scoring		Third period	No scoring
Kari Piiroinen (13 shots / 11 saves)		Goalie stats	Stefanos Lekkas (16 shots / 16 saves)

2 May	KalPa	2–4	SaiPa	Olvi Areena	Recap
Patrick Curry (7) – 5:51		First period	9:16 – Saku Salminen (2)
No scoring		Second period	15:09 – Roni Karvinen (3); 15:37 – Mikko Petman (7)
Andreas Okany (2) – 3:20		Third period	9:58 – Janne Naukkarinen (2)
Stefanos Lekkas (25 shots / 21 saves)		Goalie stats	Kari Piiroinen (22 shots / 20 saves); Michael Hutchinson (2 shots / 2 saves)

3 May	SaiPa	2–3	OT	KalPa	Lappeenrannan jäähalli	Recap
Mark Pysyk (3) – 18:30		First period		12:45 – Benjamin Korhonen (2)
No scoring		Second period		No scoring
Antti Kalapudas (8) – 12:49		Third period		18:52 – Juuso Mäenpää (7; EA)
No scoring		First overtime period		6:08 – Filip Westerlund (1)
Michael Hutchinson (37 shots / 34 saves)		Goalie stats		Stefanos Lekkas (31 shots / 29 saves)

KalPa win series 4–2

== Play Out and Relegation ==
The two bottom-placed teams from the regular season played a best-of-seven series, with the winner remaining in the Liiga and the loser having to face the winner of the Mestis in a relegation series. The higher-seeded team and in the relation series the team from Liiga held home advantage over the series, playing at home for the first and third games and games five and seven (if required) while the lower-seeded team was at home for games two, four and six (if required).

=== Bracket ===
Playout series			Relegation series
15	Pelicans	1
16	Jukurit	4	L	Pelicans	4
			M	Jokerit	1

=== Play Out ===
21 March	Pelicans	2–1	Jukurit	Isku Areena	Recap
Antti Tyrväinen (1) – 5:53		First period	No scoring
Antti Tyrväinen (2) – 9:00		Second period	No scoring
No scoring		Third period	18:33 – Jesper Piitulainen (1)
Patrik Bartošák (29 shots / 28 saves)		Goalie stats	Evan Buitenhuis (13 shots / 11 saves)

22 March	Jukurit	2–1	OT	Pelicans	Ikioma Areena	Recap
Max Ellis (1; PPG) – 9:37		First period		No scoring
No scoring		Second period		No scoring
No scoring		Third period		16:28 – Lars Bryggman (1; PPG)
Max Ellis (2) – 10:56		First overtime period		No scoring
Evan Buitenhuis (13 shots / 12 saves)		Goalie stats		Patrik Bartošák (29 shots / 27 saves)

25 March	Pelicans	3–8	Jukurit	Isku Areena	Recap
Leevi Tukiainen (1; PPG2) – 13:47; Lars Bryggman (2) – 19:21		First period	2:32 – Topias Hynninen (1; PPG); 10:27 – Peter Abbandonato (1; 2PPG); 18:51 – Aleks Haatanen (1; PPG)
No scoring		Second period	4:28 – Peter Abbandonato (2; PPG); 5:44 – Peter Abbandonato (3; PPG); 6:47 – Topias Hynninen (2; PPG); 8:42 – Juuso Arola (1; 2PPG)
Miro Väänänen (1) – 15:39		Third period	13:30 – Max Ellis (3; 2PPG)
Patrik Bartošák (13 shots / 7 saves); Olof Lindbom (15 shots / 13 saves)		Goalie stats	Evan Buitenhuis (23 shots / 20 saves)

28 March	Jukurit	4–1	Pelicans	Ikioma Areena	Recap
Peter Abbandonato (4) – 7:20		First period	No scoring
Kim Johansson (1; PPG) – 19:06		Second period	No scoring
Viljam Sandvik (1; SHG) – 9:37; Bence Horváth (1; ENG) – 19:42		Third period	11:48 – Joona Kumpula (1)
Evan Buitenhuis (19 shots / 18 saves)		Goalie stats	Patrik Bartošák (23 shots / 20 saves)

29 March	Pelicans	2–3	OT	Jukurit	Isku Areena	Recap
No scoring		First period		18:47 – Max Ellis (4)
No scoring		Second period		0:31 – Sakke Hämäläinen (1)
Johannes Johannesen (1) – 0:25; Tomas Poletin (1) – 14:12		Third period		No scoring
No scoring		First overtime period		1:24 – Peter Abbandonato (5; PPG)
Patrik Bartošák (27 shots / 24 saves)		Goalie stats		Evan Buitenhuis (22 shots / 20 saves)

Jukurit win series 4–1

=== Relegation series ===
8 April	Pelicans	5–0	Jokerit	Isku Areena	Recap
Lars Bryggman (1) – 3:01; Joona Kumpula (1) – 14:56		First period	No scoring
Hampus Falk (1) – 3:25; Daniel Nieminen (1) – 11:20		Second period	No scoring
Ryan Lasch (1) – 15:00		Third period	No scoring
Patrik Bartošák (7 shots / 7 saves)		Goalie stats	Sisu Heikkeri (14 shots / 10 saves); Henri Risikko (8 shots / 7 saves)

10 April	Jokerit	4–3	2OT	Pelicans	Helsinki Ice Hall	Recap
Jesse Liuksiala (1) – 6:17; Antti Pihlström (1) – 7:42		First period		2:32 – Leevi Tukiainen (1; PS)
Jesse Liuksiala (2) – 3:49		Second period		No scoring
No scoring		Third period		17:01 – Elias Vilén (1; EA; PPG); 18:09 – Daniel Nieminen (2; EA)
Ville Vainikainen (1) – 10:50		Second overtime period		No scoring
Sisu Heikkeri (28 shots / 25 saves)		Goalie stats		Patrik Bartošák (22 shots / 18 saves)

12 April	Pelicans	2–0	Jokerit	Isku Areena	Recap
Daniel Nieminen (3) – 11:01		First period	No scoring
No scoring		Second period	No scoring
Leevi Tukiainen (2) – 0:15		Third period	No scoring
Patrik Bartošák (18 shots / 18 saves)		Goalie stats	Sisu Heikkeri (21 shots / 19 saves)

15 April	Jokerit	3–4	OT	Pelicans	Helsinki Ice Hall	Recap
Rony Ahonen (1) – 10:18		First period		16:54 – Joona Kumpula (2)
Teemu Suhonen (1; PPG) – 12:04; Valtteri Filppula (1) – 19:08		Second period		4:31 – Johannes Johannesen (1); 9:45 – Elias Vilén (2; PPG)
No scoring		Third period		No scoring
No scoring		First overtime period		2:54 – Miro Väänänen (1)
Sisu Heikkeri (29 shots / 25 saves)		Goalie stats		Patrik Bartošák (23 shots / 20 saves)

17 April	Pelicans	4–0	Jokerit	Isku Areena	Recap
Lars Bryggman (2) – 13:48		First period	No scoring
Antti Tyrväinen (1) – 0:31		Second period	No scoring
Elias Vilén (3; PPG) – 6:13; Konsta Hirvonen (1; SHG; ENG) – 18:21		Third period	No scoring
Patrik Bartošák (26 shots / 26 saves)		Goalie stats	Santeri Lipiäinen (21 shots / 18 saves)

Pelicans win series 4–1

== Final rankings ==
Gold medal	KalPa
Silver medal	SaiPa
Bronze medal	Ilves
4	Lukko
5	HIFK
6	Ässät
7	Tappara
8	Sport
9	KooKoo
10	Kiekko-Espoo
11	HPK
12	TPS
13	Kärpät
14	JYP
15	Jukurit
16	Pelicans
