= Atro Leppänen =

Finnish ice hockey player (born 1998)

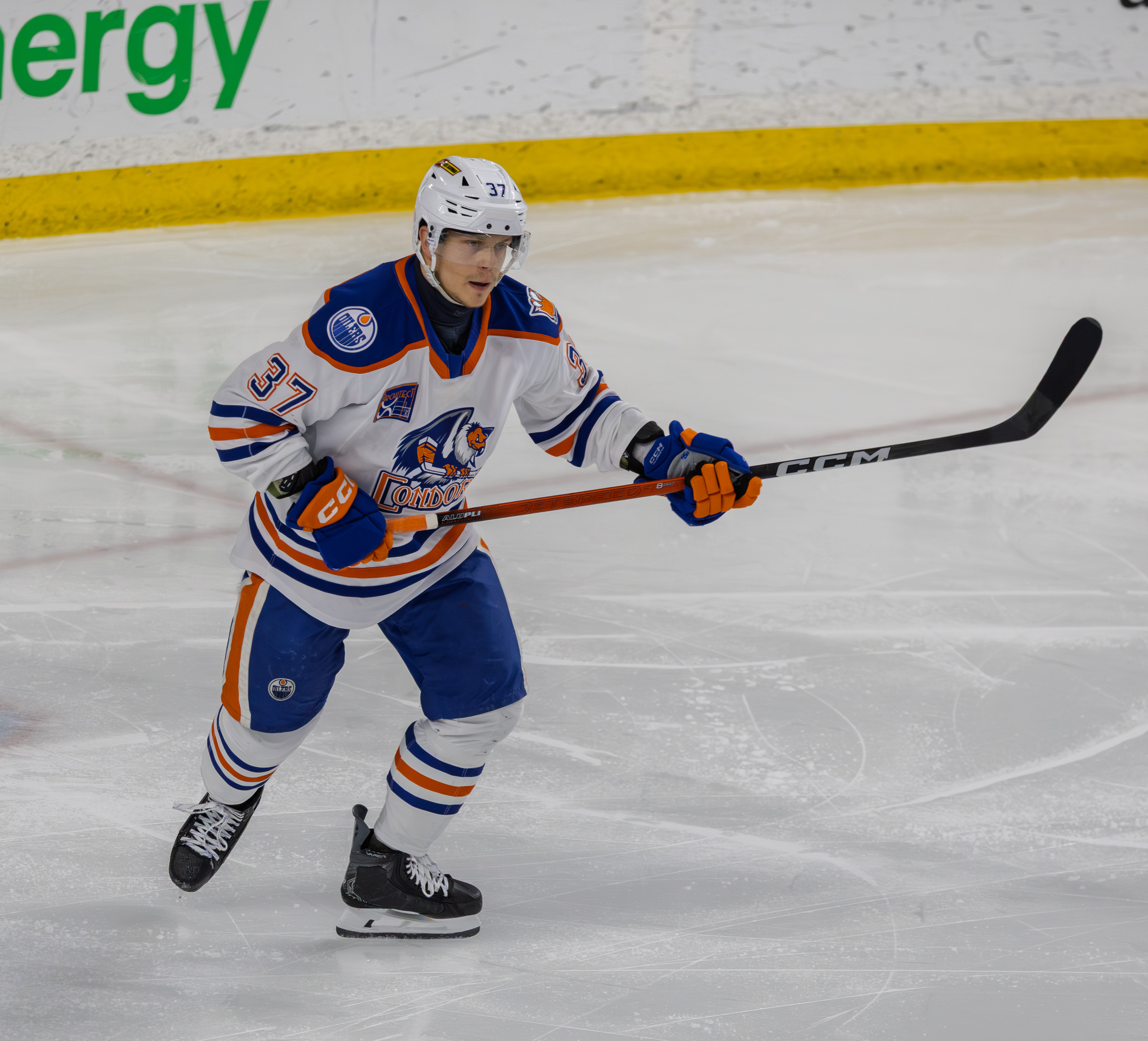
- Leppanen with the Bakersfield Condors in April 2026
- Born: 14 December 1998 (age 27) Mänttä, Finland
- Height: 181 cm (5 ft 11 in)
- Weight: 85.75 kg (189 lb; 13 st 7 lb)
- Position: Defenceman
- Shoots: Left
- NHL team (P) Cur. team Former teams: Edmonton Oilers; Bakersfield Condors (AHL); Vaasan Sport
- National team: Finland
- NHL draft: Undrafted
- Playing career: 2019–present

Atro Leppänen (born 14 December 1998) is a Finnish ice hockey defenceman currently playing for the Bakersfield Condors in the American Hockey League (AHL) while under contract to the Edmonton Oilers of the National Hockey League (NHL).

== Playing career ==
In the 2024–25 Liiga season, Leppänen set the all-time Liiga record for points by a defenceman.

On 13 April 2025, Leppänen signed a one-year contract with the Edmonton Oilers.

=== Years in Mestis ===
In August 2019, Leppänen transferred to the Mestis team, playing for the KeuPa HT hockey club, for a trial period. A little over a month later, an extension contract was received to continue with the team for the rest of the 2019–2020 season. During his rookie season, he also played 25 regular season games. He also played two Finnish Cup games, making one assist. In April 2020, he signed a one-year extension contract with KeuPa. In the 2020–2021 season, Leppänen scored 4+11=15 points in 29 regular season games for Mestis and 1+2=3 points in three playoff games. In July 2021, he signed another one-year extension contract with KeuPa.

Leppänen transferred to Kiekko-Espoo for the 2022–2023 season to continue his Mestis games on a one-year contract. He was being lured to the team by head coach Tomas Westerlund, who is familiar to Leppänen from KeuPasta. He was voted the league's player of the month for January. On February 7, 2023, Leppänen broke the Mestis all-time single-season point record for defensemen with his 47th power point of the season. The record was previously held by Kalle Valtola from the 2017–2018 season. On February 10, 2023, he broke the defensemen's goal record held by Kai Syväsalmi with his 19th goal of the season. During the regular season, Leppänen ultimately scored 23+35=58 power points, with which he won the Kiekko-Espoos internal point exchange. He shared third place in the Mesti points total with Juuso Heikkilä of KeuPa HT. In addition to Leppänen, his teammates Aleksi Matinmikko and Ketterä's Jere Vertanen also broke the Valtola defensemen's points record and IPK's Alex Cotton equalled it. He also shared the series' power play goal record with Kiekko-Vantaa's Emil Oksanen with 13 goals. Leppänen won the Mesti championship at the end of the season. He was voted into the first All-Star team of the series. In the Finnish Cup, Leppänen was Kiekko-Espoo's top scorer and scorer with 5+3=8 power points. The tournament ended with the team's victory.

== International play ==
Leppänen represented the Finnish national team at the 2025 IIHF World Championships.

== Career statistics ==
=== Regular season and playoffs ===
			Regular season					Playoffs
Season	Team	League	GP	G	A	Pts	PIM	GP	G	A	Pts	PIM
2019–20	KeuPa HT	Mestis	36	3	4	7	20	—	—	—	—	—
2020–21	KeuPa HT	Mestis	29	4	11	15	4	3	1	2	3	0
2021–22	KeuPa HT	Mestis	29	7	16	23	14	7	2	3	5	2
2022–23	Kiekko-Espoo	Mestis	51	23	35	58	20	10	1	4	5	2
2023–24	Vaasan Sport	Liiga	55	12	16	28	18	2	0	0	0	0
2024–25	Vaasan Sport	Liiga	60	21	42	63	30	8	0	3	3	0
2025–26	Bakersfield Condors	AHL	53	11	27	38	28	3	1	0	1	0
Liiga totals			115	33	58	93	48	10	0	3	3	0

=== International ===
Year	Team	Event	GP	G	A	Pts	PIM
2025	Finland	WC	8	0	2	2	2
Senior totals			8	0	2	2	2
