= Ville Petman =

Finnish ice hockey player (born 2000)

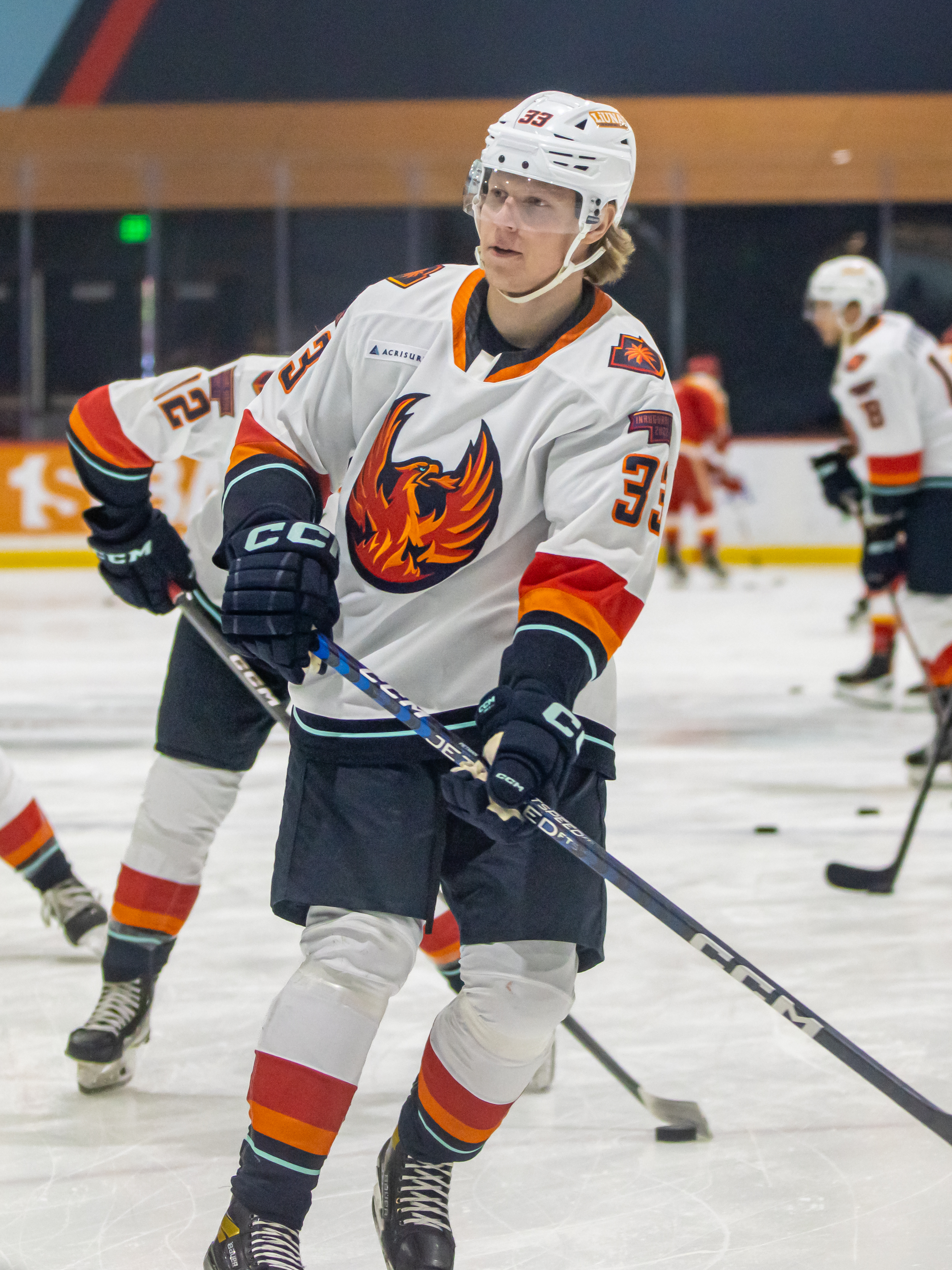
- Petman with the Coachella Valley Firebirds in 2022
- Born: January 18, 2000 (age 26) Lappeenranta, Finland
- Height: 5 ft 10 in (178 cm)
- Weight: 181 lb (82 kg; 12 st 13 lb)
- Position: Centre
- Shoots: Left
- ELH team Former teams: HC Škoda Plzeň; Lukko; SaiPa; Coachella Valley Firebirds
- NHL draft: Undrafted
- Playing career: 2017–present

Ville Petman (born January 18, 2000) is a Finnish professional ice hockey forward currently playing for HC Škoda Plzeň of the Czech Extraliga.

== Playing career ==
Petman played junior hockey in the SM-sarja with SaiPa. In the 2015–16 season, he was named the captain of the club's C youth team. For the 2016–17 season, together with his younger brother Mikko, he moved to Rauman Lukko's B-youth team. Their mother, Seija, also moved to Rauma to support the brothers, who were only 15 and 16 years old at the time. In the 2017–18 season, Petman played mostly with Lukko's A-youth team, but he also debuted in the professional games after playing four regular season games on loan with the Mestis team KeuPa HT, scoring one goal.

Petman went undrafted at the 2018 NHL entry draft, but he participated in the Los Angeles Kings' development camp that same summer. In that same summer, Petman would join Lukko's SM-Liiga team. He would start the 2018–19 season in the team's A-youth. Petman made his Liiga debut on December 11, 2018, against the Lahti Pelicans. A place in Lukko's lineup opened up when Manuel Ganahl's was called up to the Finnish national team. Petman was placed as a left wing on the team's fourth line, paired with Eetu Koivistonen and Aaro Vidgren. He finally got 8:11 minutes of ice time in the game. Petman would play 14 regular season games in the Liiga during the season, notching three assists.

In his actual Liiga rookie season 2019–20, Petman managed 2 goals and 6 assists in 40 regular season games. He scored the first goal of his Liiga career on December 13, 2019, against KalPa. In February 2020, Petman also played two games on loan for the Mestis team in SaPKo with his brother Mikko.

For the 2020–21 season, Petman returned to his original team, SaiPa, with a two-year contract, which he signed or March 23, 2020. Petman managed to score once during the season in the final game. For the 2021–22 season, Pekka Virta, whom he knew from Lukko, took over as SaiPa's head coach. Petman made his breakthrough in the Liiga and he always became the team's number one center, partly also after Jarno Koskiranta's season ended early due to injuries. He led SaiPa's in points, goals and assists with 15 goals and 24 assists for 39 points. On September 28, 2021, Petman signed a two-year contract extension with the team.

In June 2022, Petman signed a two-year, entry-level contract with the Seattle Kraken of the National Hockey League (NHL). At the end of Kraken's training camp, Petman was sent to the Coachella Valley Firebirds of the American Hockey League (AHL).

At the conclusion of his contract with the Kraken and having played exclusively with the Firebirds in the AHL, Petman as a pending restricted free agent opted to return to his former Finnish club, securing a one-year contract with SaiPa of the Liiga on 28 June 2024.

== International play ==
Medal record

Representing Finland

Ice hockey

World U18 Championship
| Gold medal – first place | 2018 Russia | |

Petman played in the 2018 IIHF World U18 Championships, where he won gold representing Finland. That same year, Petman also competed in the 2018 Hlinka Gretzky Cup.

He also played in the 2020 World Junior Ice Hockey Championships.

== Career statistics ==
=== Regular season and playoffs ===
| | | | Regular season | | | | | Playoffs |
| Season | Team | League | GP | G | A | Pts | PIM | GP | G | A | Pts | PIM |
|---|---|---|---|---|---|---|---|---|---|---|---|---|
| 2017–18 | Lukko | Jr. A | 48 | 8 | 17 | 25 | 55 | — | — | — | — | — |
| 2017–18 | KeuPa HT | Mestis | 4 | 1 | 0 | 1 | 12 | — | — | — | — | — |
| 2018–19 | Lukko | Jr. A | 29 | 7 | 11 | 18 | 10 | — | — | — | — | — |
| 2018–19 | Lukko | Liiga | 14 | 0 | 3 | 3 | 2 | — | — | — | — | — |
| 2019–20 | Lukko | Jr. A | 10 | 7 | 3 | 10 | 24 | — | — | — | — | — |
| 2019–20 | Lukko | Liiga | 40 | 2 | 6 | 8 | 12 | — | — | — | — | — |
| 2019–20 | SaPKo | Mestis | 2 | 0 | 3 | 3 | 0 | — | — | — | — | — |
| 2020–21 | SaiPa | Liiga | 40 | 1 | 1 | 2 | 22 | — | — | — | — | — |
| 2021–22 | SaiPa | Liiga | 59 | 15 | 24 | 39 | 38 | — | — | — | — | — |
| 2022–23 | Coachella Valley Firebirds | AHL | 72 | 12 | 16 | 28 | 21 | 26 | 5 | 6 | 11 | 8 |
| 2023–24 | Coachella Valley Firebirds | AHL | 55 | 2 | 10 | 12 | 20 | — | — | — | — | — |
| 2024–25 | SaiPa | Liiga | 59 | 19 | 30 | 49 | 43 | 21 | 4 | 4 | 8 | 76 |
| 2025–26 | HC Škoda Plzeň | Czechia | 52 | 10 | 11 | 21 | 24 | 2 | 0 | 0 | 0 | 0 |
| AHL totals | | | 127 | 14 | 26 | 40 | 41 | 26 | 5 | 6 | 11 | 8 |

=== International ===
| Year | Team | Event | Result | GP | G | A | Pts | PIM |
|---|---|---|---|---|---|---|---|---|
| 2018 | Finland | U18 | 1st place, gold medalist(s) | 7 | 2 | 3 | 5 | 4 |
| 2020 | Finland | WJC | 4th | 7 | 1 | 0 | 1 | 0 |
| Junior totals | | | | 14 | 3 | 3 | 6 | 4 |
