= Henri Ikonen =

Finnish ice hockey player

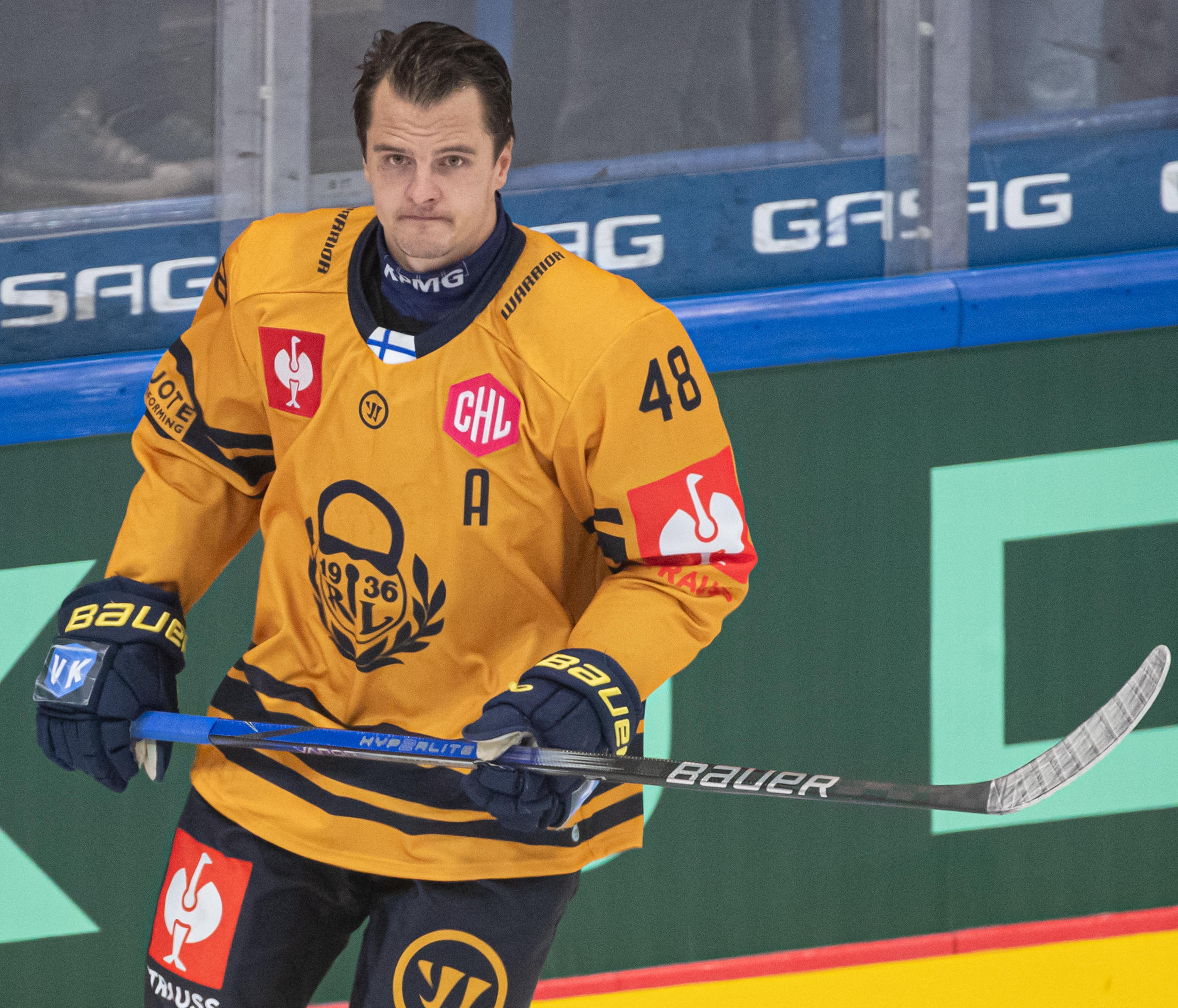
- Ikonen with Lukko in 2025
- Born: April 17, 1994 (age 32) Savonlinna, Finland
- Height: 6 ft 0 in (183 cm)
- Weight: 190 lb (86 kg; 13 st 8 lb)
- Position: Left wing
- Shoots: Left
- Liiga team Former teams: Lukko; KalPa; Syracuse Crunch; Jokerit
- NHL draft: 154th overall, 2013; Tampa Bay Lightning
- Playing career: 2011–present

Henri Ikonen (born April 17, 1994) is a Finnish professional ice hockey forward currently playing for Lukko in the Liiga. Ikonen was selected by the Tampa Bay Lightning in the 6th round (154th overall) of the 2013 NHL entry draft.

== Playing career ==
Ikonen made his professional and SM-liiga debut with KalPa Kuopio during the 2011–12 season. He played the 2012–13 season in the Ontario Hockey League with the Kingston Frontenacs.

On April 6, 2014, Ikonen was signed to a three-year entry-level contract with the Tampa Bay Lightning.

At the conclusion of his entry-level contract and without appearing in an NHL contest with the Lightning, Ikonen returned to Finland in agreeing to a two-year contract with Jokerit of the KHL on June 19, 2017.

== Career statistics ==
=== Regular season and playoffs ===
			Regular season					Playoffs
Season	Team	League	GP	G	A	Pts	PIM	GP	G	A	Pts	PIM
2010–11	KalPa	Jr. A	26	7	10	17	8	—	—	—	—	—
2011–12	KalPa	Jr. A	37	17	28	45	18	9	8	6	14	2
2011–12	KalPa	SM-l	8	0	1	1	4	—	—	—	—	—
2012–13	Kingston Frontenacs	OHL	61	22	29	51	30	4	1	0	1	4
2013–14	Kingston Frontenacs	OHL	54	25	45	70	49	7	1	5	6	8
2013–14	Syracuse Crunch	AHL	6	0	2	2	2	—	—	—	—	—
2014–15	Syracuse Crunch	AHL	59	5	8	13	43	3	0	0	0	0
2015–16	Syracuse Crunch	AHL	61	3	8	11	31	—	—	—	—	—
2015–16	Greenville Swamp Rabbits	ECHL	3	1	0	1	0	—	—	—	—	—
2016–17	Syracuse Crunch	AHL	54	6	11	17	27	1	0	1	1	0
2017–18	Jokerit	KHL	35	4	9	13	22	4	0	0	0	2
2018–19	Jokerit	KHL	46	1	4	5	45	2	0	0	0	2
2019–20	Jokerit	KHL	42	8	6	14	18	1	0	0	0	0
2020–21	Jokerit	KHL	40	2	5	7	20	1	0	0	0	0
2021–22	Jokerit	KHL	25	1	3	4	4	—	—	—	—	—
2021–22	Lukko	Liiga	12	2	3	5	2	7	0	0	0	4
Liiga totals			20	2	4	6	6	7	0	0	0	4
KHL totals			188	16	27	43	109	8	0	0	0	4

=== International ===
Year	Team	Event	Result	GP	G	A	Pts	PIM
2011	Finland	U17	7th	5	1	3	4	2
2011	Finland	IH18	4th	4	0	1	1	2
2012	Finland	U18	4th	7	2	0	2	4
2014	Finland	WJC	1st place, gold medalist(s)	7	1	2	3	2
Junior totals				23	4	6	10	10
