= Antti Kalapudas =

Finnish ice hockey player

- Born: 22 July 1996 (age 29) Oulainen, Finland
- Height: 182 cm (6 ft 0 in)
- Weight: 73 kg (161 lb; 11 st 7 lb)
- Position: Forward
- Shoots: Left
- Liiga team Former teams: SaiPa; Oulun Kärpät; KalPa; Vaasan Sport; JYP Jyväskylä
- Playing career: 2015–present

Antti Kalapudas (born 22 July 1996, Oulainen) is a Finnish ice hockey player. He currently plays center for SaiPa of the Liiga. Kalapudas has played at Kajaanin Hokki in Mestis and younger with Oulun Kärpät Juniors. He debuted at Finland's Liiga team against Vienna Capitals presenting in CHL-game, 22 August 2015 in Vienna, Austria.
