= Kai Syväsalmi =

Finnish ice hockey player

- Born: 20 December 1984 (age 40); Tampere, Finland
- Height: 5 ft 10 in (178 cm)
- Weight: 170 lb (77 kg; 12 st 2 lb)
- Position: Defence
- Shot: Left
- Played for: HPK; KalPa; Tappara
- NHL draft: Undrafted
- Playing career: 2002–2014

Kai Syväsalmi (born 20 December 1984) is a Finnish former professional ice hockey defenceman who played in the SM-liiga for HPK, KalPa, and Tappara.
