= John Nyberg =

Swedish ice hockey player

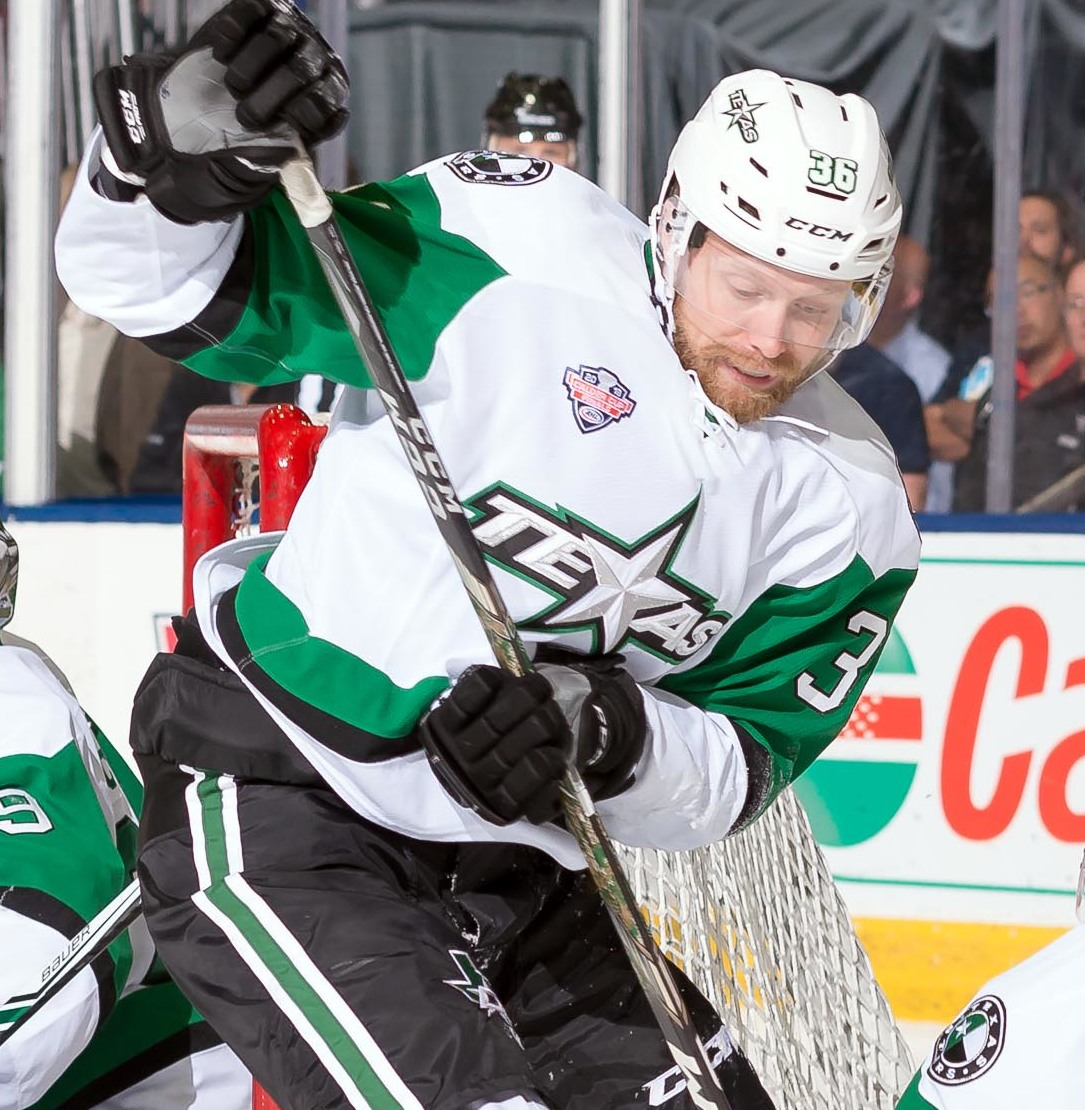
- Born: 14 July 1996 (age 30) Gothenburg, Sweden
- Height: 6 ft 3 in (191 cm)
- Weight: 195 lb (88 kg; 13 st 13 lb)
- Position: Defence
- Shoots: Left
- Liiga team Former teams: Ilves; Frölunda HC; Texas Stars; WBS Penguins; Brynäs IF; Linköping HC; HV71
- NHL draft: 165th overall, 2014; Dallas Stars
- Playing career: 2014–present

John Nyberg (born 14 July 1996) is a Swedish professional ice hockey defenceman currently playing for Ilves of the Liiga. He was selected by the Dallas Stars in the sixth round (165th overall) of the 2014 NHL entry draft.

== Playing career ==
Nyberg made his Swedish Hockey League debut with Frölunda HC during the 2014–15 SHL season. After playing his first full year in the SHL in the 2016–17 season, posting 7 goals and 15 points in 49 games, Nyberg opted to pursue an NHL career in agreeing to a three-year, entry-level contract with the Dallas Stars on 18 May 2017.

During the 2019–20 season, unable to make progression within the Stars depth chart and while in the final season of his entry-level contract, Nyberg having contributed with 6 points in 19 games with the Texas Stars was traded by Dallas to the Pittsburgh Penguins in exchange for Oula Palve on 17 January 2020. Nyberg appeared in 16 games with affiliate, Wilkes-Barre/Scranton Penguins, posting 4 assists before the season was abruptly cancelled due to COVID-19.

On 10 June 2020, Nyberg left the Penguins organization and signed a two-year contract with Brynäs IF of the SHL.

== Career statistics ==
			Regular season					Playoffs
Season	Team	League	GP	G	A	Pts	PIM	GP	G	A	Pts	PIM
2013–14	Frölunda HC	J20	19	1	3	4	0	—	—	—	—	—
2014–15	Frölunda HC	J20	25	7	10	17	26	8	1	1	2	16
2014–15	Frölunda HC	SHL	17	0	1	1	2	—	—	—	—	—
2014–15	IK Oskarshamn	Allsv	9	0	1	1	2	—	—	—	—	—
2014–15	Mora IK	Allsv	4	0	0	0	0	—	—	—	—	—
2015–16	Frölunda HC	J20	3	1	2	3	0	3	0	3	3	6
2015–16	Frölunda HC	SHL	6	0	0	0	2	—	—	—	—	—
2015–16	IK Oskarshamn	Allsv	46	1	8	9	36	5	0	0	0	0
2016–17	Frölunda HC	SHL	49	7	8	15	32	14	1	0	1	10
2017–18	Frölunda HC	SHL	52	2	11	13	40	6	0	2	2	4
2017–18	Texas Stars	AHL	—	—	—	—	—	8	0	2	2	8
2018–19	Texas Stars	AHL	44	1	5	6	17	—	—	—	—	—
2018–19	Idaho Steelheads	ECHL	4	0	1	1	4	—	—	—	—	—
2019–20	Texas Stars	AHL	19	2	4	6	13	—	—	—	—	—
2019–20	Wilkes-Barre/Scranton Penguins	AHL	16	0	4	4	10	—	—	—	—	—
2020–21	Brynäs IF	SHL	50	4	8	12	24	—	—	—	—	—
2021–22	Brynäs IF	SHL	11	0	3	3	6	—	—	—	—	—
2021–22	Linköping HC	SHL	40	2	7	9	16	—	—	—	—	—
2022–23	Linköping HC	SHL	51	1	7	8	20	—	—	—	—	—
2023–24	Linköping HC	SHL	45	4	10	14	16	4	0	0	0	2
2024–25	HV71	SHL	14	0	0	0	31	—	—	—	—	—
2024–25	Ilves	Liiga	33	2	7	9	16	6	2	2	4	12
SHL totals			335	20	55	75	189	24	1	2	3	16

== Awards and honors ==
Award	Year
CHL
Champions (Frölunda HC)	2017
