= Michael Hutchinson (ice hockey) =

Canadian ice hockey player (born 1990)

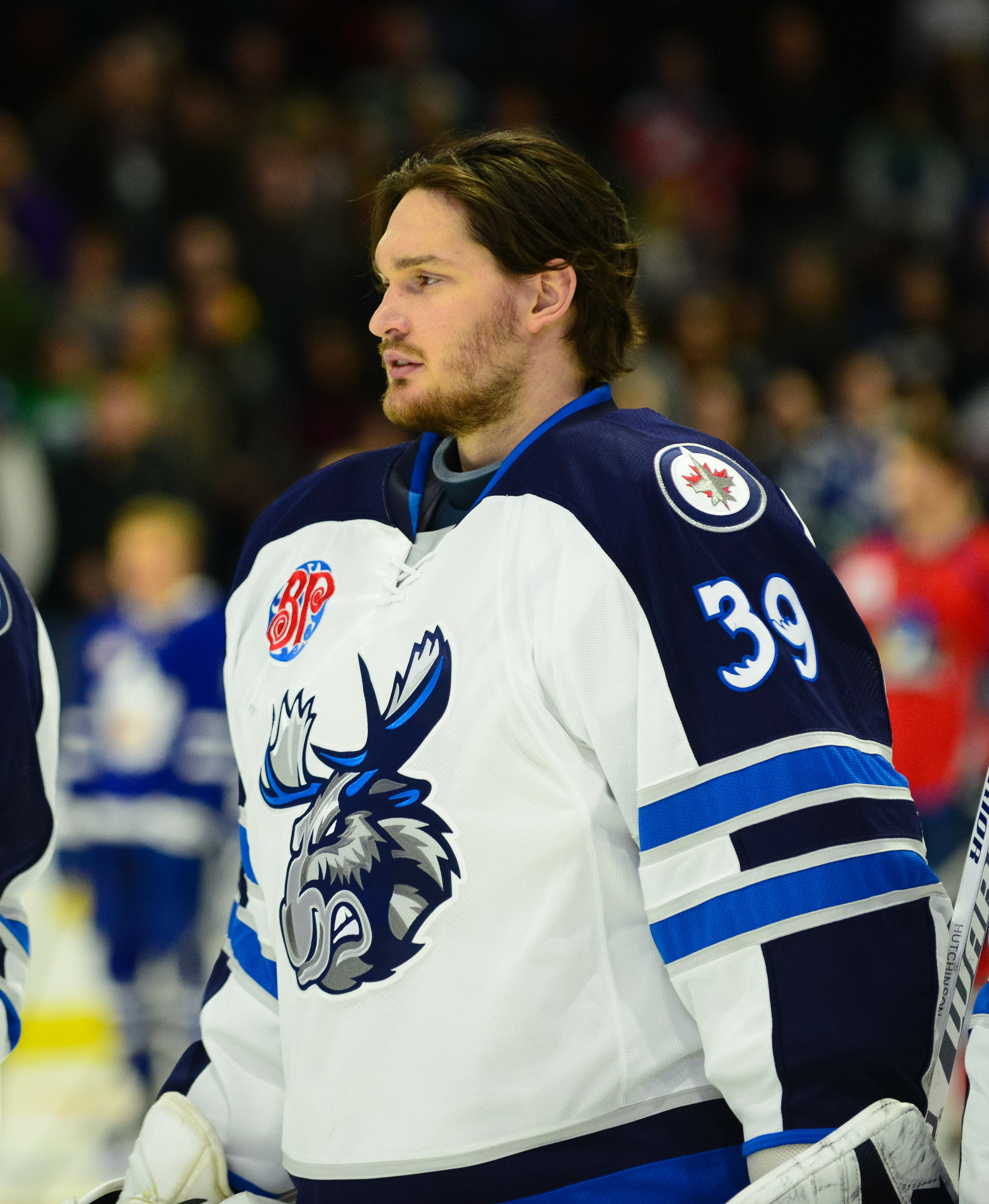
- Hutchinson with the Manitoba Moose in 2018
- Born: March 2, 1990 (age 36) Barrie, Ontario, Canada
- Height: 6 ft 3 in (191 cm)
- Weight: 202 lb (92 kg; 14 st 6 lb)
- Position: Goaltender
- Caught: Right
- Played for: Winnipeg Jets; Florida Panthers; Toronto Maple Leafs; Colorado Avalanche; Columbus Blue Jackets; Detroit Red Wings; SaiPa
- NHL draft: 77th overall, 2008; Boston Bruins
- Playing career: 2010–2025

Michael Edward Hutchinson (born March 2, 1990) is a Canadian former professional ice hockey goaltender. Hutchinson was selected by the Boston Bruins in the third round, 77th overall, of the 2008 NHL entry draft, and played parts of eleven seasons in the National Hockey League (NHL) for the Winnipeg Jets, Florida Panthers, Toronto Maple Leafs, Colorado Avalanche, Columbus Blue Jackets, and Detroit Red Wings, as well as a brief stint in the Finnish Liiga with SaiPa.

== Playing career ==
=== Amateur ===
Hutchinson grew up playing minor hockey for the Barrie Icemen (now Jr. Colts) of the OMHA's Eastern AAA League. He was a member of the Ontario Blues summer hockey team that featured other notable graduates such as Steven Stamkos, John Tavares, Alex Pietrangelo, Michael Del Zotto, Stefan Della Rovere, Cody Hodgson and Cameron Gaunce. Hutchinson was selected in the third round, 69th overall, of the 2006 OHL Priority Selection by his hometown Barrie Colts. After three years in Barrie, Hutchinson was traded in the summer of 2009 to the London Knights, where he finished his junior career.

=== Professional ===
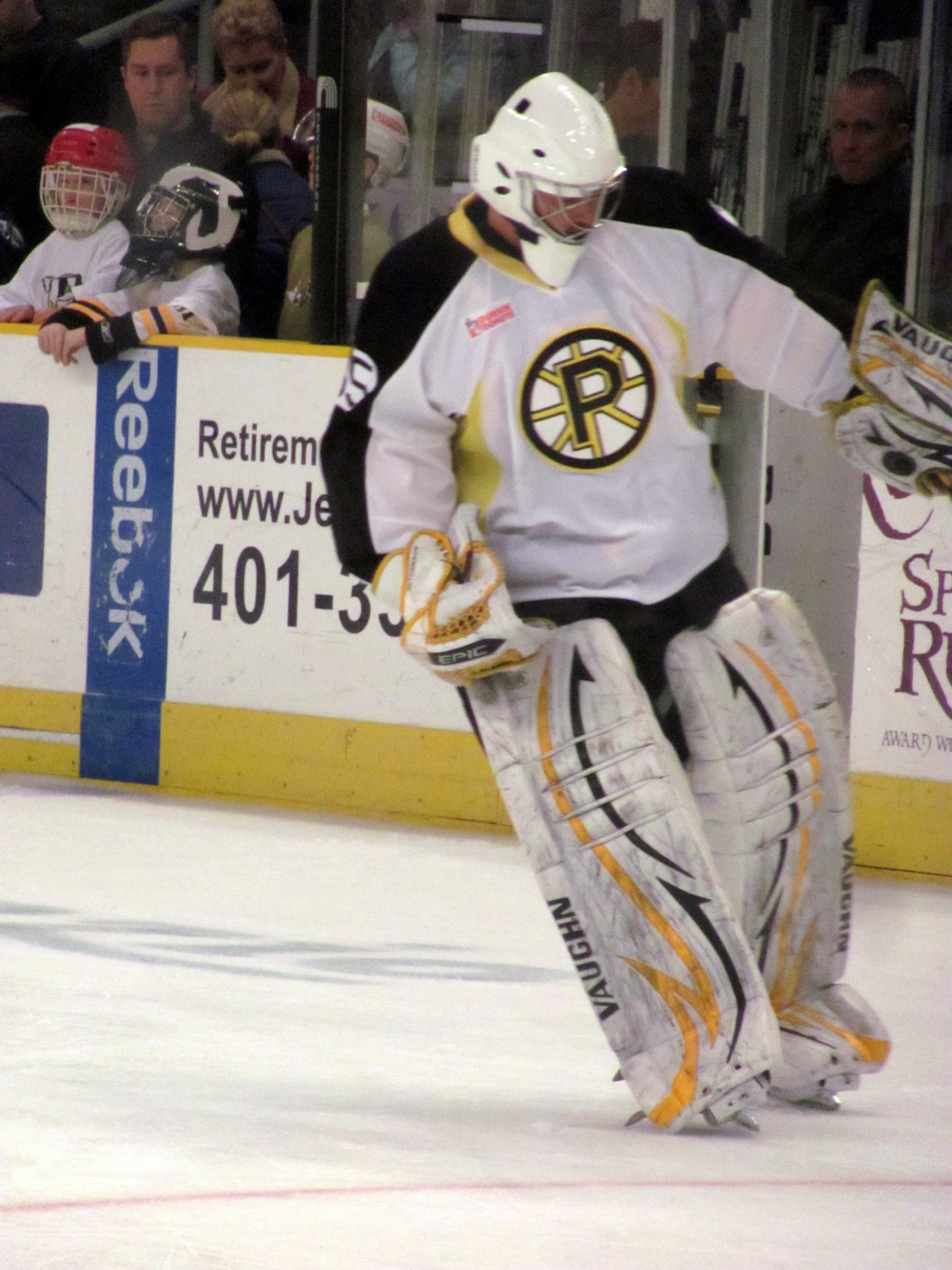
Hutchinson with the Providence Bruins in 2011, an AHL affiliate of the Boston Bruins.

==== Boston Bruins ====
On March 30, 2010, the Boston Bruins signed Hutchinson to a three-year, entry-level contract. Having split the 2010–11 season with the Bruins' minor league affiliates—the Providence Bruins of the American Hockey League (AHL) and the Reading Royals of the ECHL—on April 12, 2011, Hutchinson was recalled by Boston to the NHL. On March 3, 2012, just one day after his 22nd birthday, Hutchinson was recalled by Boston to serve as the team's back-up goaltender on the night due to an injury to starter Tuukka Rask.

==== Winnipeg Jets ====
On July 19, 2013, as a free agent, Hutchinson signed a one-year, two-way contract with the Winnipeg Jets. He was assigned to the Jets' secondary affiliate, the Ontario Reign of the ECHL to begin the 2013–14 season. Hutchinson posted 22–4–2 record with the Reign, earning a promotion to Winnipeg's AHL affiliate, the St. John's IceCaps. With the IceCaps' starting goaltender Edward Pasquale suffering season-ending injury, Hutchinson posted a 15–5 record before earning a recall to the Winnipeg Jets on March 15, 2014.

On April 7, 2014, Hutchinson made his NHL debut in a 1–0 loss to the Minnesota Wild. He played the final two games of the season with the Jets, claiming his first career NHL win with Winnipeg in a 2–1 shootout win over the Boston Bruins on April 10. He was returned to the IceCaps for the 2014 AHL playoffs, and was instrumental in helping St. John's reach the Calder Cup finals for the first time in franchise history. On July 2, 2014, the Jets signed Hutchinson to a two-year contract extension. Hutchinson played in the 2014–15 season in the NHL as the back-up to Jets starter Ondřej Pavelec. Hutchinson would finish the season with a 21–10–5 record.

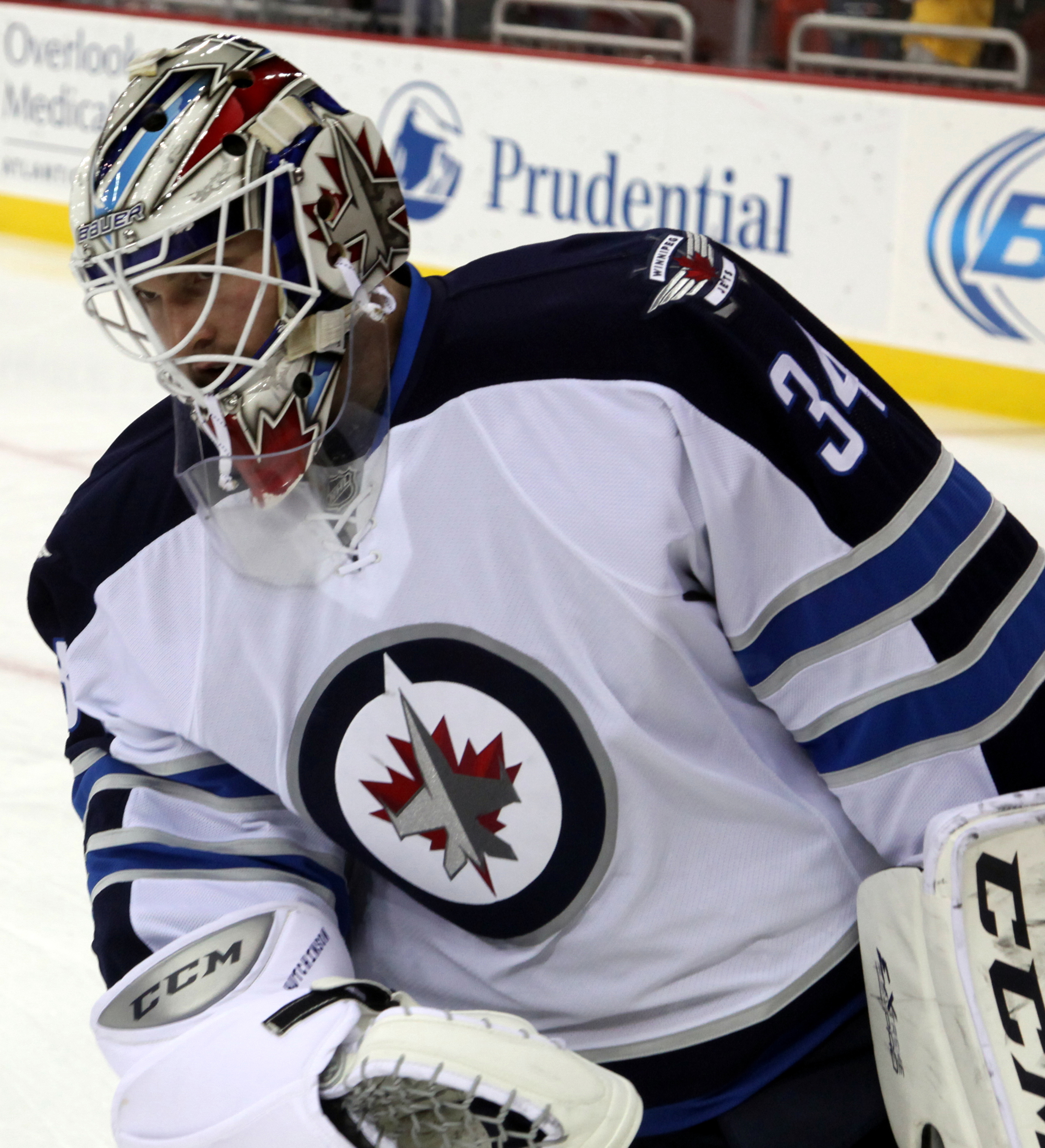
Hutchinson with the Winnipeg Jets in 2014, several months after he signed a contract extension with the team.

On June 21, 2016, Hutchinson signed another two-year contract extension with the Jets.

==== Florida Panthers and Toronto Maple Leafs ====
On July 1, 2018, having left the Jets as a free agent after five seasons, Hutchinson signed a one-year, $1.3 million contract with the Florida Panthers. After attending the Panthers' 2018 training camp, Hutchinson was reassigned to begin the 2018–19 season with their AHL affiliate, the Springfield Thunderbirds. However, he was soon recalled to the Panthers after an injury to starting goaltender Roberto Luongo, and made his debut with Florida in a 5–4 overtime defeat to the Philadelphia Flyers on October 16, 2018. Hutchison collected his first and only win with the Panthers in relief in the following contest against the Washington Capitals on October 19, 2018. After four games with the Panthers, and following the return to health of Luongo, Hutchinson was reassigned to the Thunderbirds.

Hutchinson appeared in eight games with Springfield before being traded on December 29, 2018, to the Toronto Maple Leafs in exchange for a 2020 fifth-round draft pick. He was immediately reassigned to join Toronto's AHL affiliate, the Toronto Marlies. After being recalled to the NHL, on January 3, 2019, he made his debut with the Leafs in a 4–3 loss against the Minnesota Wild. On January 5, in his second game for the Leafs, he recorded his first victory in the Maple Leafs uniform, earning a shutout in a 5–0 win against the Vancouver Canucks.

On June 29, 2019, Hutchinson agreed to a one-year, one-way $700,000 contract extension to remain with the Maple Leafs. Assuming the backup duties for the Maple Leafs entering the 2019–20 season, Hutchinson was unable to solidify his role posting a 0–4–1 record through his first six games before he was re-assigned to AHL affiliate, the Toronto Marlies, on November 12, 2019. He later returned to the Maple Leafs on November 29, 2019, and played sparingly in recording 4 wins through 15 games. On February 13, 2020, Hutchinson was placed on waivers by the Maple Leafs, eight days after the team had traded for backup goaltender Jack Campbell. He cleared waivers the next day and was loaned to the Toronto Marlies.

==== Colorado Avalanche ====
On February 24, 2020, Hutchinson was traded by the Maple Leafs to the Colorado Avalanche in exchange for Calle Rosén. Remaining with the Avalanche to cover for injured goaltender Philipp Grubauer, he served as the backup to Pavel Francouz. On March 2 (his 30th birthday), Hutchinson recorded his first win with the team, making 17 saves in a 2–1 win over the Detroit Red Wings. With the season soon halted due to the COVID-19 pandemic, Hutchinson later returned to the team as the club's third choice goaltender in the 2020 Stanley Cup playoffs.

Following injuries to both Grubauer and Francouz, Hutchinson made his playoff debut during the second round in relief of Francouz, making three saves during a 5–4 defeat to the Dallas Stars on August 30, 2020. Entering Game 5, with the Avalanche down 3–1 in the series, Hutchinson made his first start to record 31 saves in posting his first-career postseason victory on August 31, 2020. He became just the seventh goaltender in NHL history to win his first two starts while facing elimination in Game 6, helping the Avalanche level the series 3–3 after a 4–1 victory on September 2, 2020. He was unable to help advance the Avalanche to the conference finals, suffering a 5–4 overtime defeat in his fourth career post-season appearance on September 4, 2020.

==== Return to Toronto ====
As a free agent at the conclusion of his contract with the Avalanche, Hutchinson opted to return to the Maple Leafs, securing a two-year, two-way contract on October 30, 2020.

==== Vegas Golden Knights and Columbus Blue Jackets ====
On July 13, 2022, Hutchinson continued his journeyman career in the NHL, agreeing to a one-year, two-way contract with the Vegas Golden Knights. In the following 2022–23 season, Hutchinson was re-assigned to add depth to the Golden Knights AHL affiliate, the Henderson Silver Knights. He collected just one win through seven games with the Silver Knights, being recalled to the Golden Knights on multiple occasions but never playing for the club. On March 2, 2023, the Golden Knights traded Hutchinson along with a seventh-round pick in 2025 to the Columbus Blue Jackets in exchange for Jonathan Quick. Hutchinson made 16 appearances with the Blue Jackets, posting two wins to play out the regular season.

==== Detroit Red Wings ====
As a free agent from the Blue Jackets, Hutchinson went un-signed over the summer. He later signed a professional tryout (PTO) with the Detroit Red Wings by accepting an invitation to their training camp in preparation for the 2023–24 season. Hutchinson was later released from his tryout with the Red Wings and signed a PTO with AHL affiliate, the Grand Rapids Griffins, on October 6, 2023. On December 19, 2023, the Red Wings signed Hutchinson to a one-year, two-way contract for the remainder of the 2023–24 season. After injuries to starting goaltenders Ville Husso and Alex Lyon, Hutchinson made his debut for the Red Wings on December 23, 2023.

==== New Jersey Devils, SaiPa, and retirement ====
As a free agent entering the 2024–25 season, Hutchinson signed a professional tryout with the New Jersey Devils on September 5, 2024. He was later released from his PTO with the Devils prior to the commencement of the season. As an unrestricted free agent, Hutchinson signed a contract for the remainder of the 2024–2025 season with SaiPa in the Finnish Liiga on November 11. In his lone season abroad, Hutchinson appeared in 24 regular season games with SaiPa, posting 7 wins and posting a 3.02 goals against average.

After spending the entire 2025–26 season out of hockey, Hutchinson formally announced his retirement on July 28, 2026.

== Career statistics ==
			Regular season									Playoffs
Season	Team	League	GP	W	L	OTL	MIN	GA	SO	GAA	SV%	GP	W	L	MIN	GA	SO	GAA	SV%
2006–07	Barrie Colts	OHL	14	8	3	0	768	27	0	2.11	.934	1	1	0	45	1	0	1.32	.938
2007–08	Barrie Colts	OHL	32	12	15	4	1826	92	1	3.02	.912	8	4	4	500	22	1	2.64	.941
2008–09	Barrie Colts	OHL	38	15	20	1	2146	108	5	3.02	.915	3	0	2	112	10	0	5.37	.872
2009–10	London Knights	OHL	46	32	12	2	2667	127	3	2.86	.917	12	7	5	686	47	0	4.11	.870
2010–11	Providence Bruins	AHL	28	13	10	1	1476	77	1	3.13	.904	—	—	—	—	—	—	—	—
2010–11	Reading Royals	ECHL	18	9	5	4	1049	50	1	2.86	.918	—	—	—	—	—	—	—	—
2011–12	Providence Bruins	AHL	29	13	14	1	1680	66	3	2.36	.927	—	—	—	—	—	—	—	—
2011–12	Reading Royals	ECHL	2	1	1	0	120	7	0	3.50	.915	—	—	—	—	—	—	—	—
2012–13	Providence Bruins	AHL	30	13	13	3	1749	67	3	2.30	.914	2	0	0	49	1	0	1.22	.938
2013–14	Ontario Reign	ECHL	28	22	4	2	1671	58	3	2.08	.921	—	—	—	—	—	—	—	—
2013–14	St. John's IceCaps	AHL	24	17	5	1	1383	53	3	2.30	.923	21	12	9	1290	42	3	1.95	.938
2013–14	Winnipeg Jets	NHL	3	2	1	0	183	5	0	1.64	.943	—	—	—	—	—	—	—	—
2014–15	Winnipeg Jets	NHL	38	21	10	5	2138	85	2	2.39	.914	—	—	—	—	—	—	—	—
2015–16	Winnipeg Jets	NHL	30	9	15	3	1586	75	0	2.84	.907	—	—	—	—	—	—	—	—
2016–17	Winnipeg Jets	NHL	28	9	12	3	1386	67	1	2.92	.903	—	—	—	—	—	—	—	—
2017–18	Manitoba Moose	AHL	26	17	5	4	1561	54	2	2.08	.935	—	—	—	—	—	—	—	—
2017–18	Winnipeg Jets	NHL	3	2	1	0	129	7	0	3.26	.907	—	—	—	—	—	—	—	—
2018–19	Springfield Thunderbirds	AHL	8	2	3	2	433	24	0	3.33	.906	—	—	—	—	—	—	—	—
2018–19	Florida Panthers	NHL	4	1	1	2	202	14	0	4.18	.839	—	—	—	—	—	—	—	—
2018–19	Toronto Marlies	AHL	23	14	5	3	1312	59	2	2.70	.910	2	0	1	77	5	0	3.88	.821
2018–19	Toronto Maple Leafs	NHL	5	2	3	0	295	13	1	2.64	.914	—	—	—	—	—	—	—	—
2019–20	Toronto Maple Leafs	NHL	15	4	9	1	788	48	1	3.66	.886	—	—	—	—	—	—	—	—
2019–20	Toronto Marlies	AHL	4	3	1	0	242	8	0	1.98	.943	—	—	—	—	—	—	—	—
2019–20	Colorado Avalanche	NHL	1	1	0	0	60	1	0	1.00	.944	4	2	1	196	9	0	2.75	.910
2020–21	Toronto Maple Leafs	NHL	8	4	2	1	422	17	1	2.42	.919	—	—	—	—	—	—	—	—
2020–21	Toronto Marlies	AHL	2	2	0	0	119	2	1	1.01	.975	—	—	—	—	—	—	—	—
2021–22	Toronto Maple Leafs	NHL	2	0	1	0	79	6	0	4.57	.857	—	—	—	—	—	—	—	—
2021–22	Toronto Marlies	AHL	28	11	10	4	1578	85	0	3.23	.899	—	—	—	—	—	—	—	—
2022–23	Henderson Silver Knights	AHL	7	1	5	1	416	19	0	2.74	.897	—	—	—	—	—	—	—	—
2022–23	Columbus Blue Jackets	NHL	16	2	6	3	756	54	0	4.29	.877	—	—	—	—	—	—	—	—
2023–24	Grand Rapids Griffins	AHL	32	14	14	3	1866	90	2	2.89	.892	—	—	—	—	—	—	—	—
2023–24	Detroit Red Wings	NHL	1	0	1	0	58	3	0	3.11	.917	—	—	—	—	—	—	—	—
2024–25	SaiPa	Liiga	24	7	9	6	1353	68	1	3.02	.886	3	0	1	129	8	0	3.73	.864
NHL totals			154	57	62	18	8,072	395	6	2.94	.903	4	2	1	196	9	0	2.75	.910
Liiga totals			24	7	9	6	1,353	68	1	3.02	.886	3	0	1	129	8	0	3.73	.864
