= Casimir Jürgens =

Finnish ice hockey player

- Born: 26 December 1994 (age 30); Helsinki, Finland
- Height: 180 cm (5 ft 11 in)
- Weight: 82 kg (181 lb; 12 st 13 lb)
- Position: Defence
- Shoots: Left
- Liiga team Former teams: Lahti Pelicans; Tappara; SaPKo; Kiekko-Vantaa
- NHL draft: Undrafted
- Playing career: 2015–present

Casimir Jürgens (born 26 December 1994) is a Finnish professional ice hockey player. He is currently playing for Pelicans of the Finnish Liiga, serving as team captain. Jürgens made his Liiga debut appearance for Pelicans during the 2017–18 Liiga season. In April 2018, he made his debut in the Finland men's national ice hockey team.
