= Niklas Rubin =

Swedish ice hockey player (born 1995)

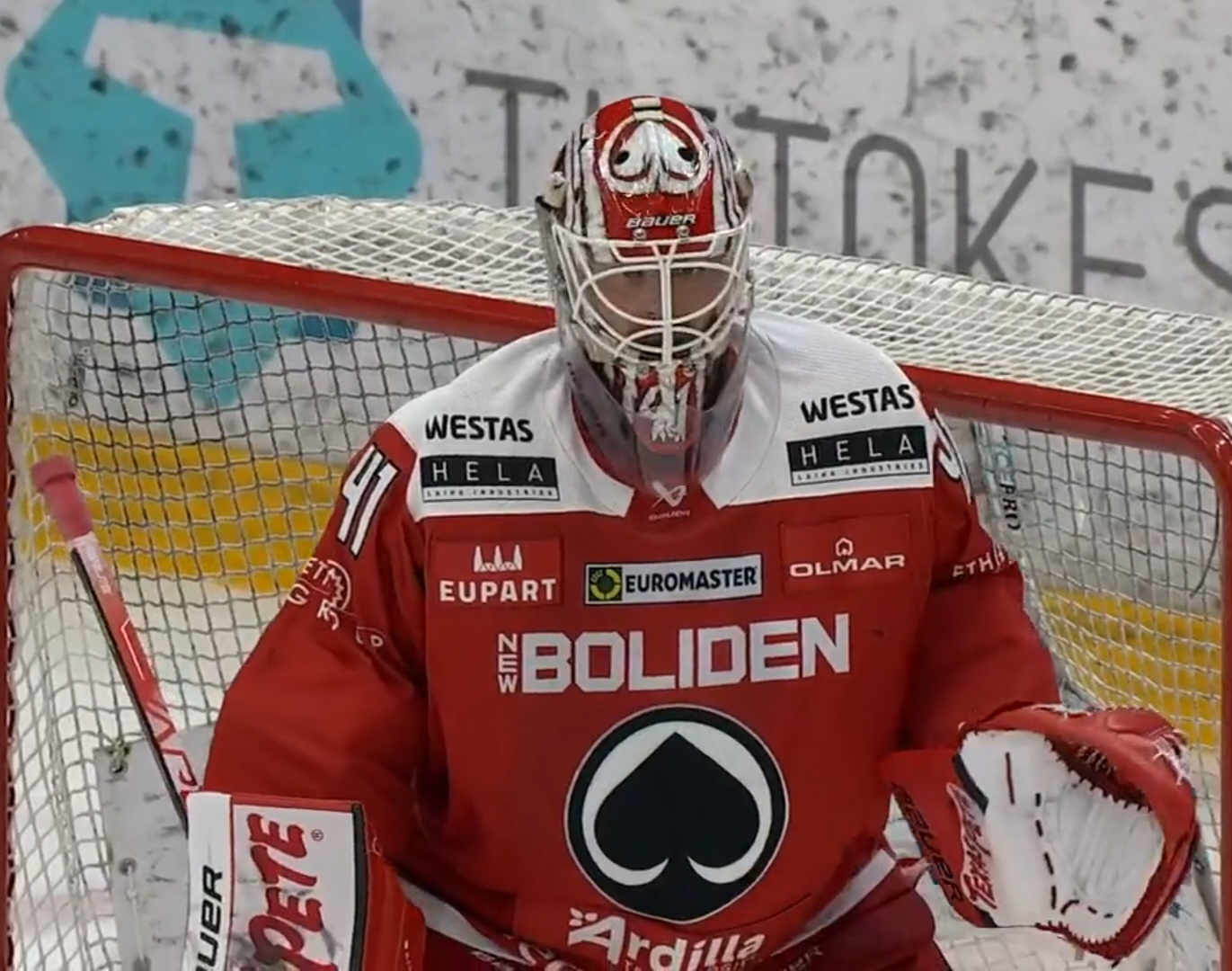
- Niklas Rubin with the Porin Ässät
- Born: December 23, 1995 (age 30) Kungsbacka, Sweden
- Height: 6 ft 0 in (183 cm)
- Weight: 181 lb (82 kg; 12 st 13 lb)
- Position: Goaltender
- Catches: Left
- Liiga team Former teams: Oulun Kärpät; Tingsryds AIF; HV71; Luleå HF; Frölunda HC; Porin Ässät
- National team: Sweden
- Playing career: 2016–present

Niklas Rubin (born December 23, 1995) is a Swedish professional ice hockey goaltender. He currently plays for Oulun Kärpät of the Liiga.

Rubin has previously played for Luleå HF and Frölunda HC in the SHL, and for Porin Ässät of the Liiga. Rubin has also played for the Swedish national hockey team.

== Career ==
=== Professional ===
==== Frölunda Indians (2019–2022) ====
In 2019 Rubin moved to Frölunda Indians with a two-year contract. In his first season with Frölunda, Rubin played 25 games with a .914 save percentage and a 2.17 GAA.

The next season Rubin played 33 games with a save percentage of .900 and a GAA of 2.51. Rubin played 3 playoff games.

Rubin extended his contract with Frölunda for one year. In Rubin's last season with Frölunda, he appeared in 23 games and posted a .891 save percentage and a 2.69 GAA.

==== Porin Ässät (2022–2025) ====
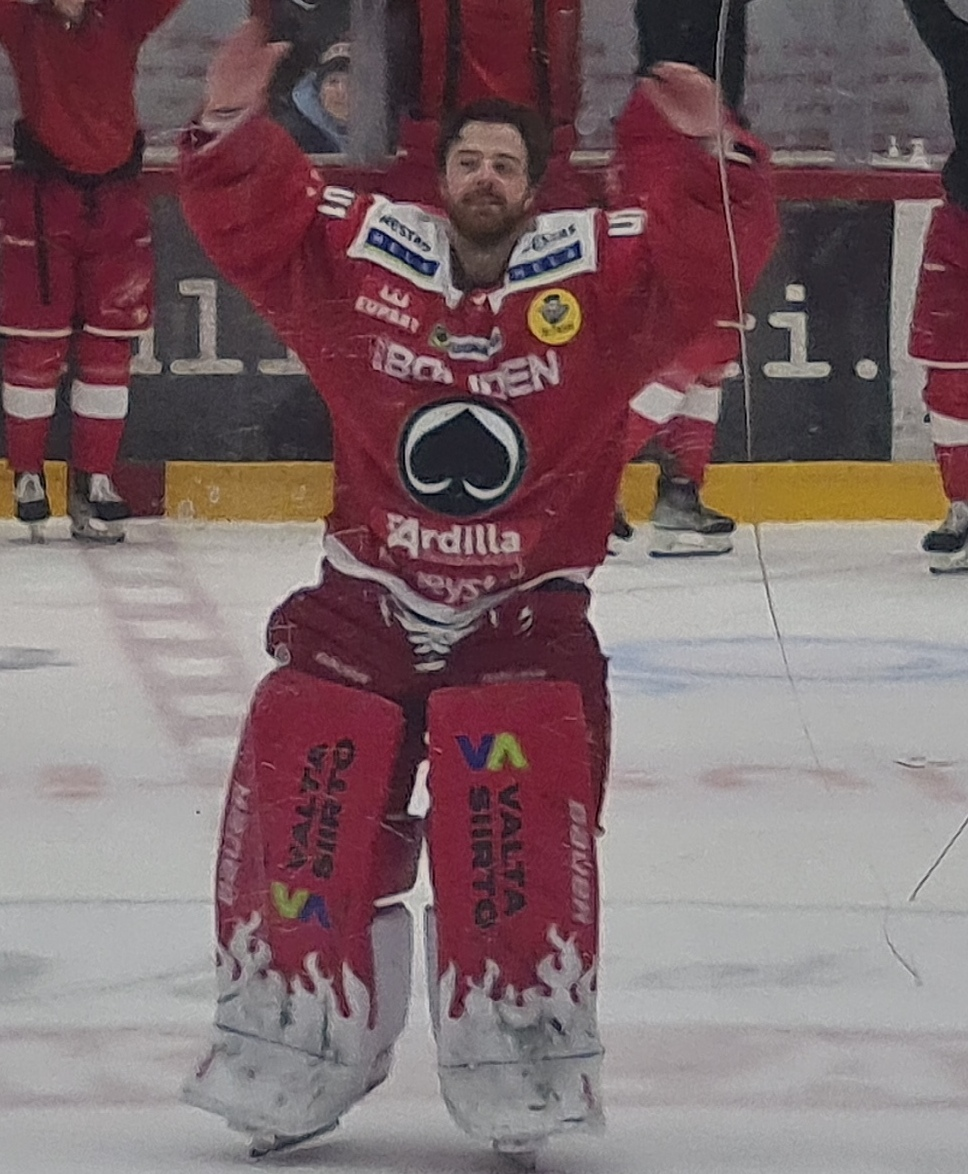
Niklas Rubin celebrating a victory against JYP on March 1st 2023

In 2022, Niklas Rubin signed a one-year contract to Porin Ässät. On 30 December 2022 Rubin became the first Ässät goalie to be credited with a goal when TPS player Michael Dal Colle scored on his own net. On January 26, 2023, Porin Ässät announced that Rubin had signed a one-year extension to his contract. Ässät announced the contract of the star goalie on a YouTube video titled "Ihan tavallinen video" (Finnish for "A completely normal video"). The title was later changed to "Niklas Rubin jatkaa Ässissä". Rubin was injured on February 8, 2023, in a game against Tappara. Rubin came back to the ice rink on March 1, 2023. Rubin won his first game after recovering from the injury when Ässät beat JYP Jyväskylä 3–2. Rubin played in a total of 47 regular season matchups with a save percentage of .922 and a GAA of 2.14. Rubin helped Ässät to the playoffs after 5 years and played 8 games with a save percentage of .898 and a GAA of 2.76.

On 21 November 2023, Ässät announced that Rubin had signed an extension with the club, that will cover the 2024–25 SM-liiga season.

==== Oulun Kärpät (2025–present) ====
On 22 April 2025 Oulun Kärpät announced that Rubin had signed a one-year contract with the team, with a clause for second year.

== Personal life ==
Rubin is in a relationship with Swedish football player Pauline Hammarlund.
