= Valtteri Viljanen =

Finnish ice hockey player

- Born: March 3, 1994 (age 31) Pori, Finland
- Height: 5 ft 8 in (173 cm)
- Weight: 163 lb (74 kg; 11 st 9 lb)
- Position: Defence
- Shoots: Right
- Liiga team Former teams: HC Ässät Pori; Ilves; Vaasan Sport; Rögle BK
- Playing career: 2014–present

Valtteri Viljanen (born March 3, 1994) is a Finnish professional ice hockey defenceman. He is currently playing with HC Ässät Pori in the Liiga.

Viljanen made his Liiga debut playing with Pori Ässät during the 2014–15 Liiga season.
