= Arttu Pelli =

Finnish ice hockey player

- Born: 22 August 1996 (age 29) Kouvola, Finland
- Height: 175 cm (5 ft 9 in)
- Weight: 75 kg (165 lb; 11 st 11 lb)
- Position: Defenceman
- Shoots: Right
- Liiga team Former teams: Ilves; KooKoo; HPK
- Playing career: 2015–present

Arttu Pelli (born 22 August 1996) is a Finnish ice hockey defenceman currently playing for Ilves of the Finnish Liiga.
