= Linus Andersson =

Swedish ice hockey player

- Born: 30 April 1999 (age 26); Arvidsjaur, Sweden
- Height: 6 ft 0 in (183 cm)
- Weight: 181 lb (82 kg; 12 st 13 lb)
- Position: Forward
- Shoots: Right
- Allsv team Former teams: MoDo Hockey; Skellefteå AIK; Djurgårdens IF; Leksands IF; KooKoo; Vaasan Sport
- Playing career: 2016–present

Linus Andersson (born 30 April 1999) is a Swedish professional ice hockey player. He is currently playing with MoDo Hockey of the Hockeyallsvenskan (Allsv).

== Playing career ==
Andersson's career began with Skellefteå AIK where he played on the U16, U18 and U20 junior teams. In 2013–14, he debuted at the under-16 level, playing three games in the J16 SM. In 2015–16 he dressed for 21 U-18 games, recording eleven goals and six assists. The following season he dressed for his first U-20 games. After impressive performances in the youth ranks, Andersson made his Swedish Hockey League debut against Växjö Lakers.
