= Lasse Lappalainen =

Finnish ice hockey player

- Born: 7 June 1989 (age 37) Kuopio, Finland
- Height: 6 ft 2 in (188 cm)
- Weight: 198 lb (90 kg; 14 st 2 lb)
- Position: Defense
- Shoots: Left
- Liiga team Former teams: SaiPa; SaPKo; KooKoo
- NHL draft: Undrafted
- Playing career: 2011–present

Lasse Lappalainen (born 7 June 1989) is a Finnish professional ice hockey player. He is currently playing for KalPa of the Finnish Liiga.

Lasse Lappalainen made his Liiga debut playing with SaiPa during the 2014-15 Liiga season.
