= Juhamatti Yli-Junnila =

Finnish ice hockey centre

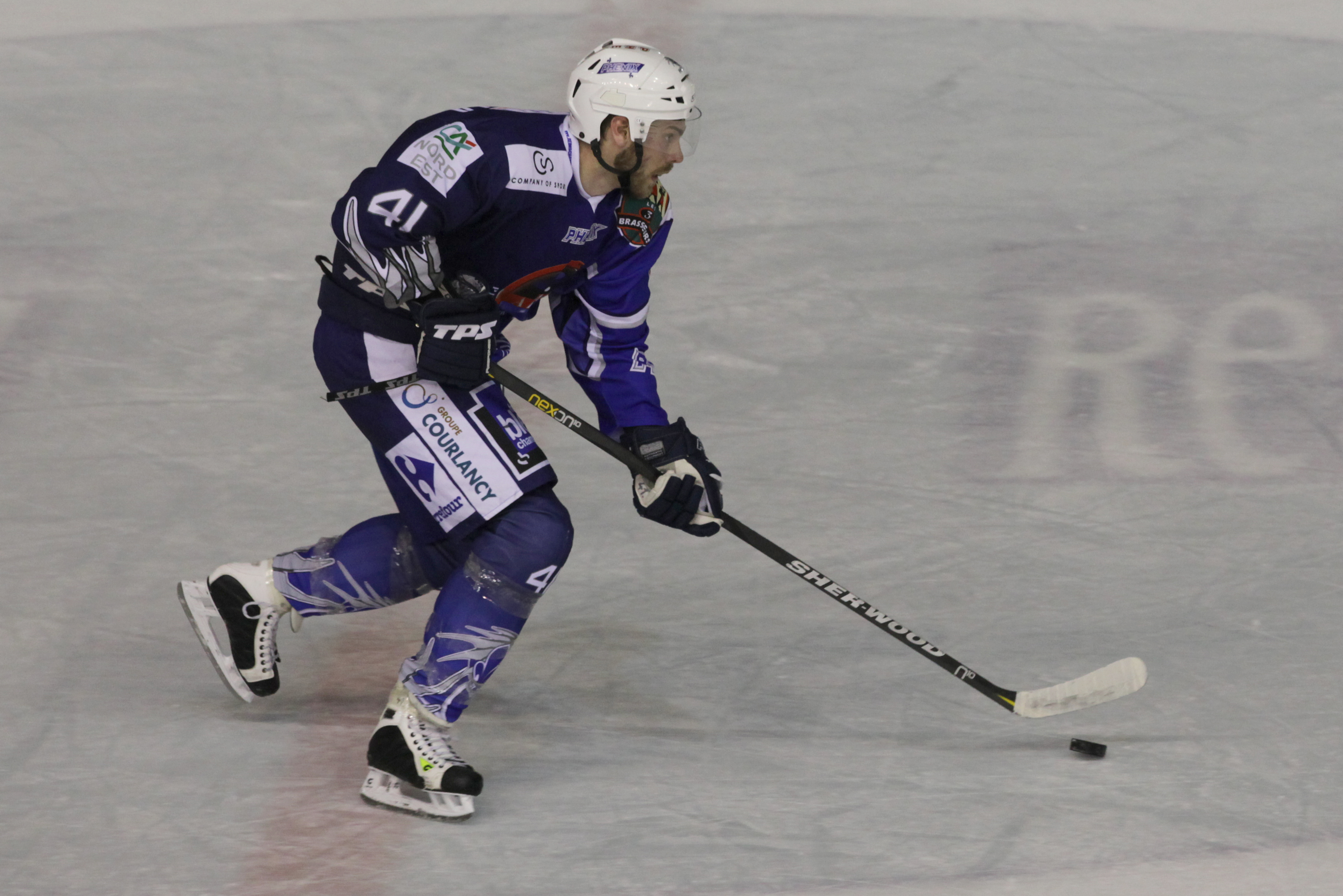
- Born: January 29, 1981 (age 44) Salo, Finland
- Height: 6 ft 5 in (196 cm)
- Weight: 212 lb (96 kg; 15 st 2 lb)
- Position: Centre
- Shot: Left
- Played for: HPK; Lukko
- Playing career: 2002–2013

Juhamatti Yli-Junnila (born January 29, 1981) is a Finnish former professional ice hockey centre.

Yli-Junnila played 274 regular season games in the SM-liiga for HPK and Lukko between 2002 and 2008. He also had loan spells in Mestis for FPS and KooKoo as well as a permanent move to Hokki in 2009.

He played in the inaugural IIHF World U18 Championship in 1999 for Finland, winning a gold medal.
