= Masi Härkönen =

- Born: August 7, 2006 (age 20) Vaasa, Finland
- Height: 179 cm (5 ft 10 in)
- Weight: 70 kg (154 lb; 11 st 0 lb)
- Position: Goaltender
- Catches: Left
- Liiga team: Vaasan Sport
- Playing career: 2024–present

Masi Härkönen (born 7 August 2006) is a Finnish professional ice hockey goaltender who plays for the Vaasan Sport of the Finnish Liiga.

== Career ==
Masi Härkönen started ice hockey as a goalie in Vaasan Sport in 2010 at the age of four.

In 2024, Härkönen signed a one-year professional Liiga contract with Vaasan Sport. He made his Liiga debut on 27 November 2024 against Rauman Lukko. The game ended in Sport's 5–1 win and Härkönen made 29 saves. In December 2024, his contract was extended by two years. On 23 February, Härkönen played his first shutout against the HC Ässät Pori making 17 saves.

== Personal life ==
Härkönen's father, Marko Härkönen, played 19 SM-liiga games with HC Ässät Pori and 235 games with Vaasan Sport in the I-divisioona and Mestis.
