= Kisapuisto =

Ice sport arena in Lappeenranta, Finland

Kisapuiston jäähalli
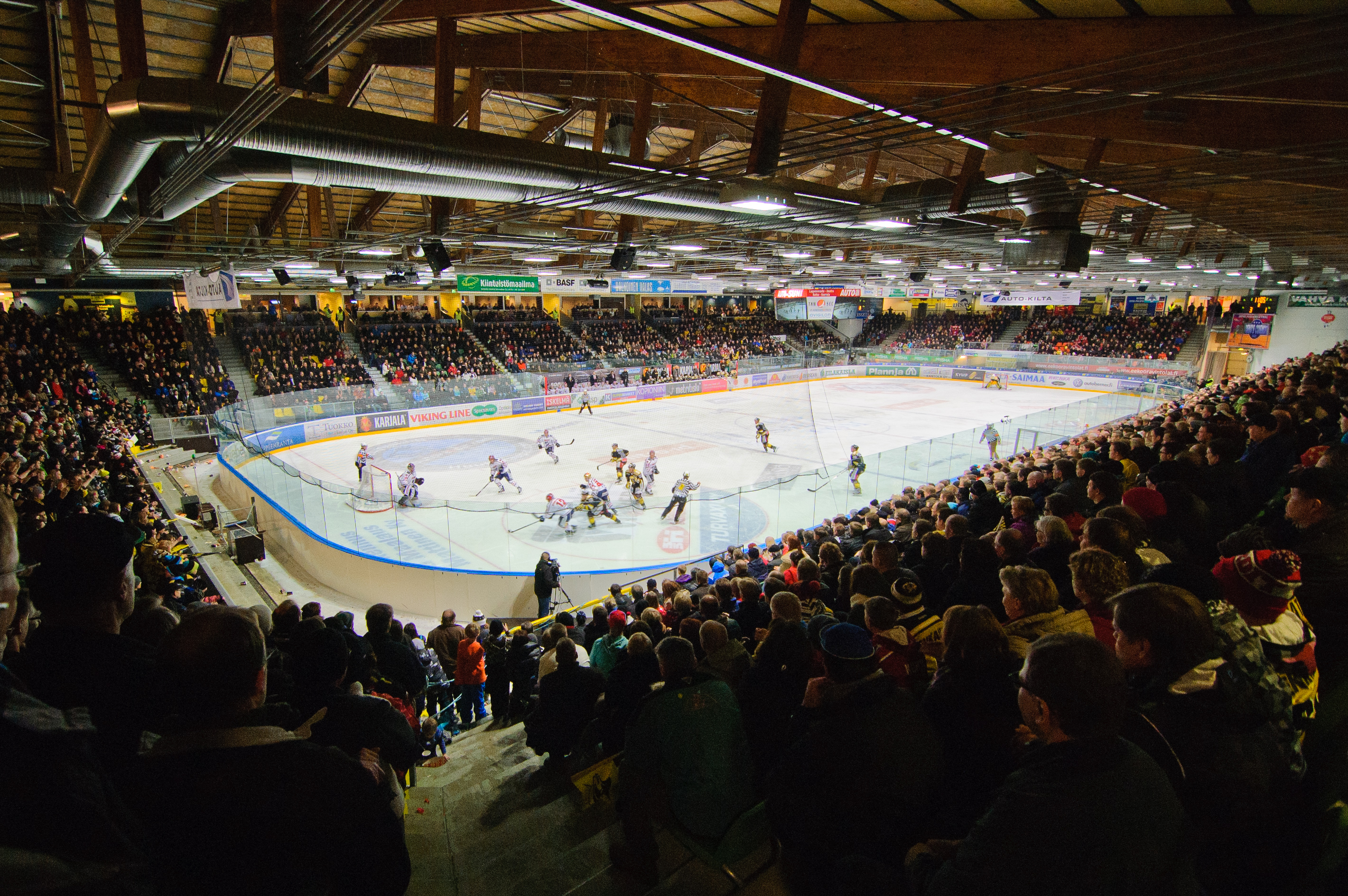
- SaiPa vs. HIFK at Kisapuiston jäähalli in 2012
- Interactive map of Kisapuiston jäähalli
- Address: Kisakatu 9 Lappeenranta
- Coordinates: 61°03′28″N 28°13′44″E
- Owner: City of Lappeenranta
- Capacity: 4,820
- Field size: 60m x 28.5 m

Construction
- Opened: 30 September 1972
- Expanded: 2004

Tenants
- SaiPa (1972–); RB-93 (1993–); Lappeenrannan Taitoluistelijat (1998–)

Lappeenrannan kisapuiston jäähalli (lit. 'Lappeenranta's Kisapuisto ice hall'), often shortened to Kisapuiston jäähalli, is an ice hockey arena in the Lappeenrannan kisapuisto of Lappeenranta, Finland. It is best known as the home arena of SaiPa, an ice hockey team in the Liiga, and is therefore sometimes called Kisapuiston liigajäähalli.

In addition to SaiPa, the arena's main occupants include the synchronized skating club Saimaan Muodostelmaluistelijat, the figure skating clubs Lappeenrannan Luistelijat and Lappeenrannan Taitoluistelijat, and RB-93, a men's rink ball club in the Kaukalopallon SM-sarja. The arena is also used for concerts, fairs, and as a venue for other sports, for example boxing.

== History ==
An outdoor artificial ice rink located the site was opened on 23 October 1963; it was the fifth artificial ice rink to be constructed in Finland. The rink was later enclosed and the ice hall opened on 30 September 1972.

Kisapuiston jäähalli was renovated and expanded in 2004. The work included expanding and updating public spaces, adding new safety protections, building nine suites, replacing the scoreboards, and renewing the sound and lighting systems.

In 2016, a structural inspection of the building was completed, the results of which identified weakness in the integrity of the roof. Due to the weight restrictions, the roof of the arena has to be cleared of snow in the winter. At the time of inspection, it was thought that the roof's issues would prevent the ceiling-suspended scoreboard from being replaced, however, a new four-sided digital scoreboard was able to be installed ahead of the 2021–22 Liiga season.

== Gallery ==
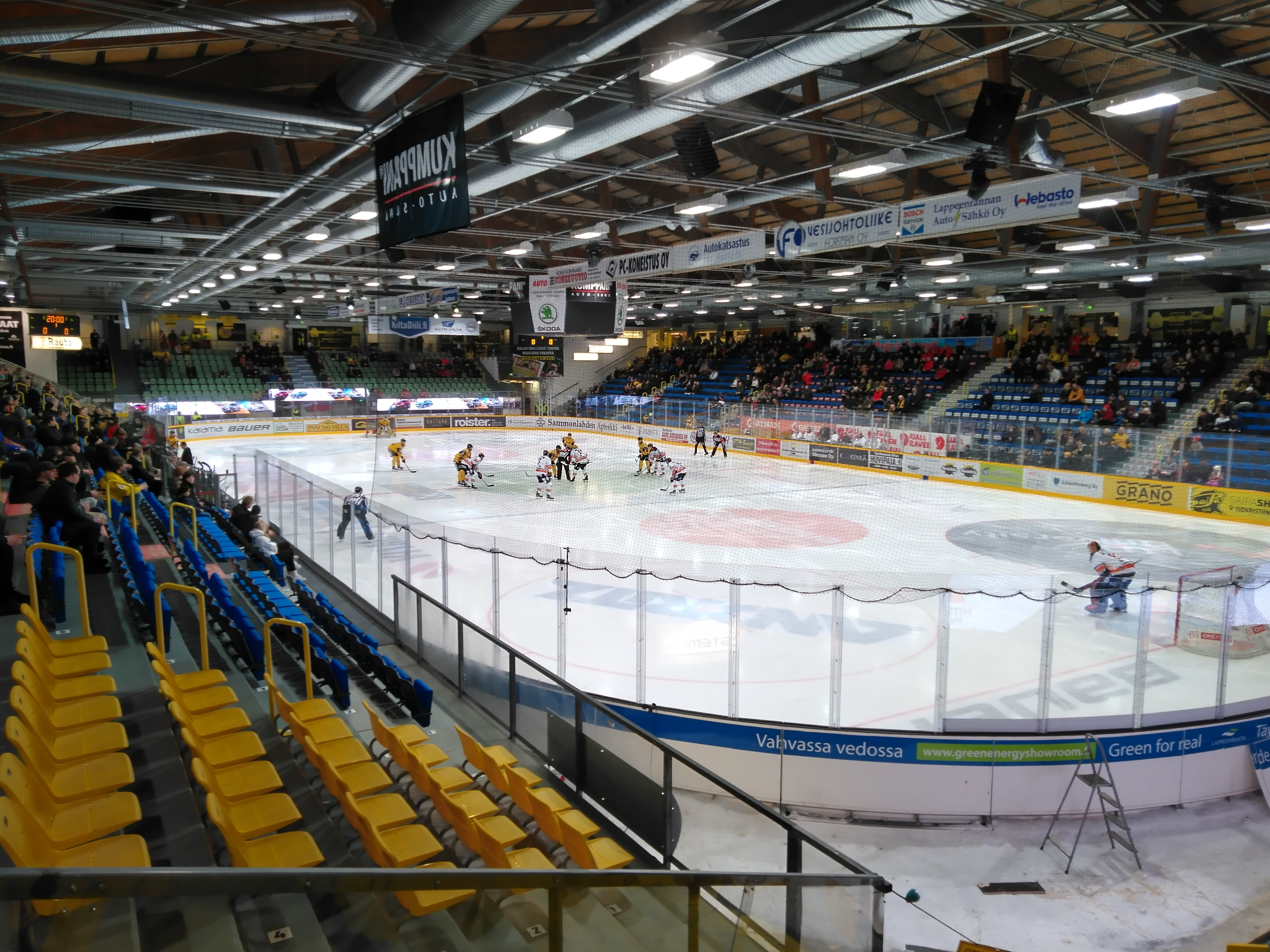
Liiga game between SaiPa (yellow) and HPK (white) in March 2020.

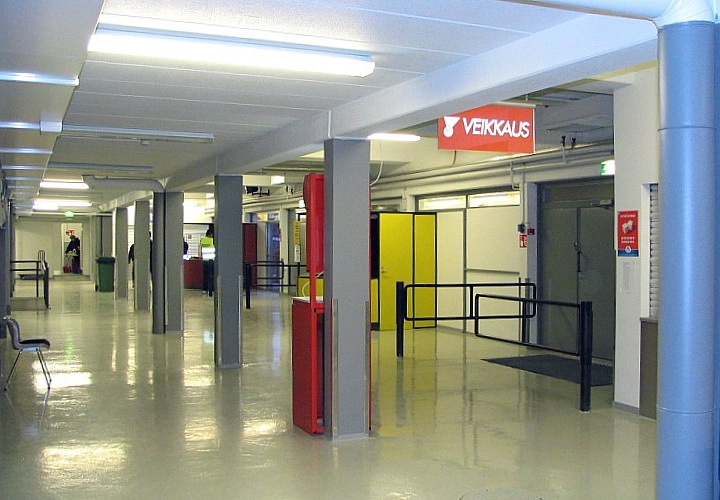
The main lobby of Kisapuiston jäähalli in 2004, after renovation.

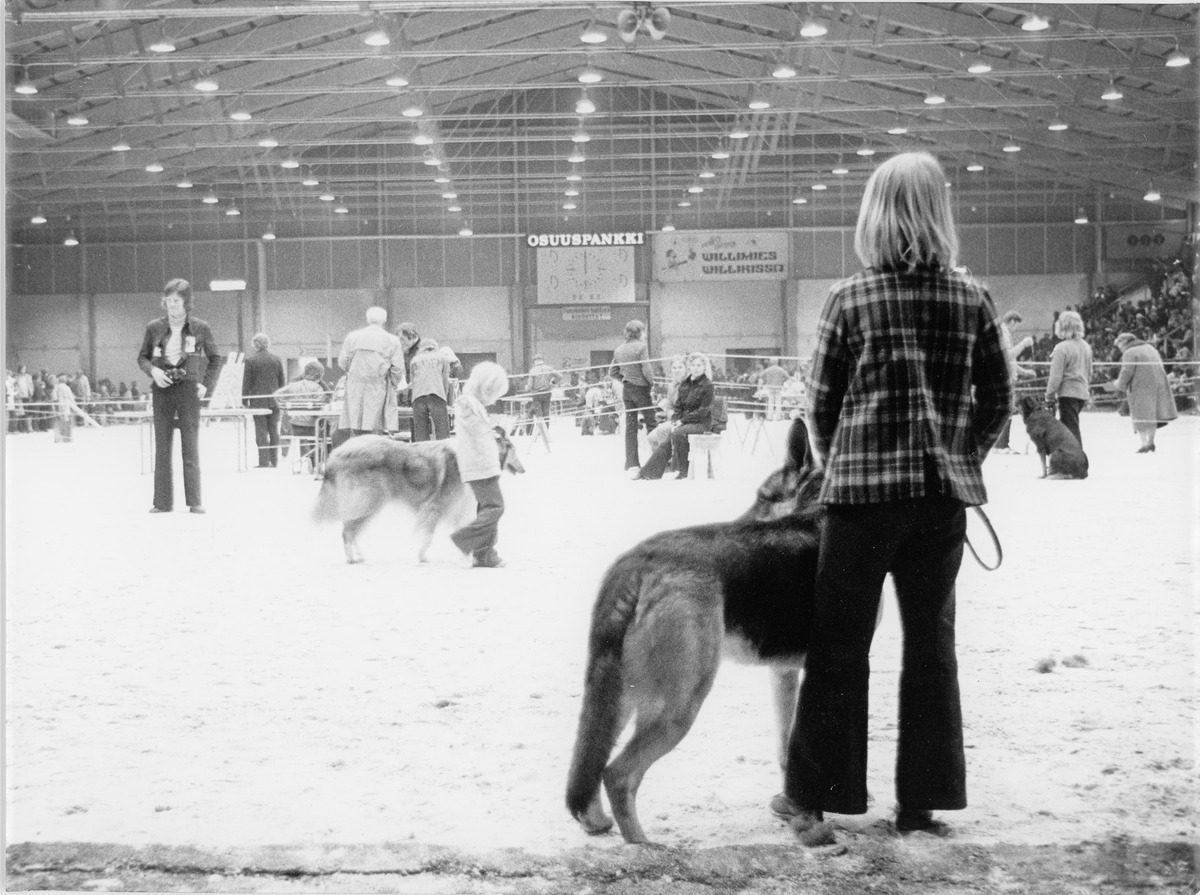
Dog show at the Kisapuisto in 1970s

== See also ==
- List of indoor arenas in Finland
