= Tuomas Salmela =

Finnish ice hockey player

- Born: 30 June 1995 (age 31) Tornio, Finland
- Height: 6 ft 2 in (188 cm)
- Weight: 187 lb (85 kg; 13 st 5 lb)
- Position: Defenceman
- Shoots: Left
- Liiga team Former teams: Porin Ässät; Asplöven HC; JYP Jyväskylä; Ilves
- Playing career: 2014–present

Tuomas Salmela (born 30 June 1995) is a Finnish professional ice hockey player who currently plays as a defenceman for Porin Ässät in the Liiga.

== Career ==
Salmela started his junior career for his local Tornio club, but moved to play for Swedish Asplöven HC over the Finnish-Swedish border.

Salmela made his professional debut with Asplöven in the 2013–14 season in the Swedish 2nd tier, HockeyAllsvenskan. Salmela continued to play for Asplöven while also playing for Kalix HC as a loanee. Salmela moved back to Finland with a two-season stint with RoKi in the 2nd tier. Salmela made his Liiga debut with JYP as a loanee from RoKi.

In the 2018–19 season Salmela moved to Liiga team Ilves Tampere where he continued to play until moving to Porin Ässät with a contract covering the 2023–24 season.
