= KalPa =

Ice hockey club in Kuopio, Finland

- City: Kuopio
- League: Liiga
- Founded: 1929
- Home arena: Olvi Areena (capacity: 5,300)
- Colours: Black, gold
- Head coach: Petri Karjalainen
- Captain: Tuomas Kiiskinen
- Affiliates: IPK
- Website: kalpa.fi
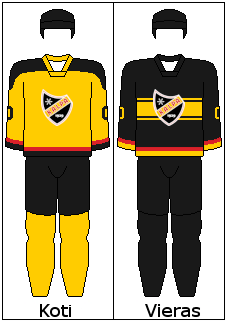

Championships
- Playoff championships: 2025

Kalevan Pallo (KalPa) is a professional ice hockey team which competes in the Finnish Liiga. They play in Kuopio, Finland at the Olvi Areena.

== Team history ==
Established in 1929 as Sortavalan Palloseura in Sortavala, the club relocated to Kuopio in 1945 after its original hometown had been annexed by the Soviet Union. During its Sortavala years, the club was not active in ice hockey, but competed in association football, bandy, and pesäpallo instead. Ice hockey was introduced in 1947, and in 1956 KalPa officially replaced the more traditional Kuopio club KuPS in that sport thus specializing in hockey – minor league football was still continued until 1974 as a farm team of sorts for KuPS.

The full name of the company that runs the representative team today is KalPa Hockey Oy. The majority of the company is owned by former NHL players Sami Kapanen and Kimmo Timonen. Kapanen is the majority owner, controlling 50.5% of the franchise. Timonen owns 8%, while Timonen's former teammate Scott Hartnell owns 5%. Hartnell purchased a minority share of the team after getting financial advice from Kimmo Timonen during a road trip to Boston.

During the 2004–05 NHL lockout, Timonen, Kapanen, and fellow NHL player Adam Hall were playing for KalPa. After winning the Mestis championship, KalPa returned to SM-liiga for the 2005–06 season, after being relegated six years earlier in 1999.

KalPa has won a total of four medals in Liiga: a gold in the 2024–25 season, silvers in the 1990–91 and 2016–17 seasons and a bronze in the 2008–09 season. KalPa has also won the Spengler Cup, in 2018.

== Honors ==
=== SM-liiga ===
- (gold) SM-liiga (Kanada-malja): 2024–25
- (silver) SM-liiga: 1990–91, 2016-17
- (bronze) SM-liiga: 2008–09

=== Mestis ===
- (gold) Mestis: 2003-04, 2004–05

=== Finnish Liiga A-juniors (U20) ===
- (gold) Finnish Liiga A-juniors (U20): 2007–08, 2017–18

=== Spengler Cup ===
- (gold) 2018

== Players ==
=== Current roster ===
As of 9 February 2025.

No.	Nat	Player	Pos	S/G	Age	Acquired	Birthplace
71	(United States)	Patrick Curry	C	L	30	2024	Schaumburg, Illinois, United States
23	(Finland)	Aleksi Elorinne	D	L	36	2023	Joensuu, Finland
32	(Finland)	Juha Jatkola	G	L	24	2020	Kuopio, Finland
93	(Czech Republic)	Matyáš Kantner	LW	L	28	2022	Plzeň, Czech Republic
97	(Czech Republic)	Lukáš Kaňák	D	L	29	2024	Klatovy, Czech Republic
42	(Finland)	Konsta Kapanen	LW	L	23	2023	Kuopio, Finland
25	(Finland)	Jere Karjalainen	RW	R	34	2024	Helsinki, Finland
19	(Finland)	Tuomas Kiiskinen (C)	LW	L	24	2021	Kuopio, Finland
20	(Finland)	Aleksi Klemetti	LW	L	27	2018	Kuhmo, Finland
86	(Estonia)	Kristjan Kombe	C	L	26	2024	Kuressaare, Estonia
17	(Finland)	Benjamin Korhonen	RW	L	25	2020	Ylivieska, Finland
14	(Finland)	Jaakko Lantta	C	R	30	2022	Valkeala, Finland
55	(Finland)	Lasse Lappalainen (A)	D	L	37	2018	Kuopio, Finland
40	(United States)	Stefanos Lekkas	G	L	30	2023	Elburn, Illinois, United States
26	(Finland)	Jesper Mattila (A)	D	L	29	2020	Tampere, Finland
9	(Finland)	Juuso Mäenpää	C	L	24	2020	Helsinki, Finland
16	(Finland)	Andreas Okany	C	L	24	2022	Kuopio, Finland
28	(Finland)	Jaakko Rissanen (A)	C	L	36	2021	Kuopio, Finland
8	(Finland)	Ville Ruotsalainen	D	D	23	2023	Oulunsalo, Finland
72	(Finland)	Iivari Räsänen	D	L	25	2024	Tampere, Finland
12	(Finland)	Joona Saarelainen	C	L	20	2024	Mikkeli, Finland
61	(Finland)	Tuomas Salmela	D	L	31	2024	Tornio, Finland
11	(Finland)	Kasper Simontaival	RW	R	24	2021	Orivesi, Finland
6	(Sweden)	Filip Westerlund	D	R	27	2023	Härnösand, Sweden

=== Honored members ===
- 1 - Pasi Kuivalainen
- 24 - Sami Kapanen
- 27 - Jouni Rinne
- 37 - Eero Kilpeläinen
- 44 - Kimmo Timonen

=== NHL alumni ===
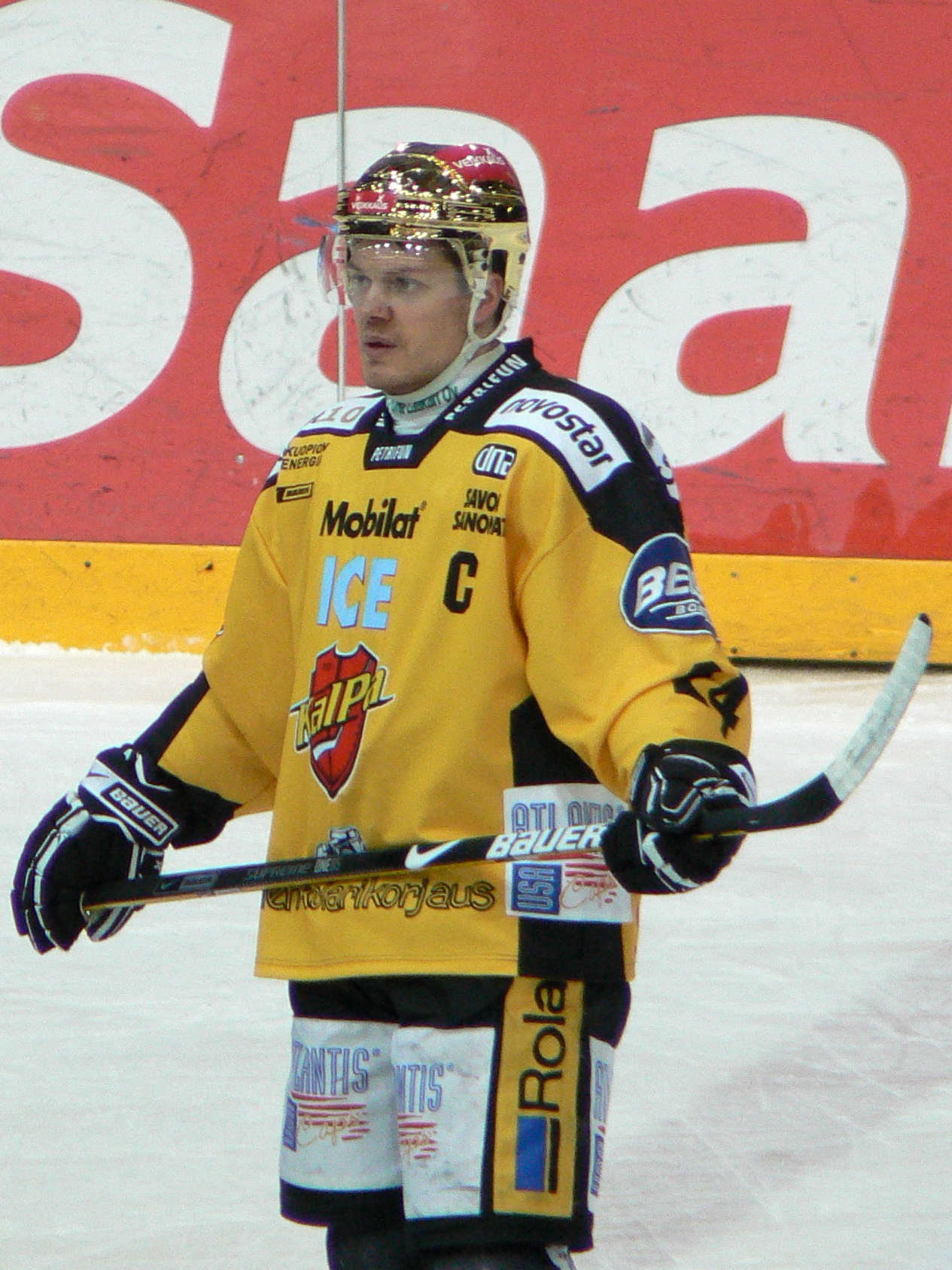
Sami Kapanen

- (United States) Adam Hall (2004–05)
- (Finland) Teemu Hartikainen (2008–10)
- (Finland) Olli Jokinen (1994–95)
- (Finland) Kasperi Kapanen (2012–15)
- (Finland) Sami Kapanen (1990–94, 2004–05, 2008–10, 2011–14)
- (Finland) Jarmo Kekäläinen (1983–85, 1991–92)
- (Finland) Mikko Koskinen (2011–13)
- (Finland) Artturi Lehkonen (2012–14)
- (Finland) Juuso Riikola (2012–18)
- (United States) Craig Smith (2012)
- (United States) Derek Stepan (2012–13)
- (Canada) Jeremy Stevenson (2007–08)
- (France) Alexandre Texier (2017–19)
- (Finland) Kimmo Timonen (1991–94, 2004–05)
- (Finland) Jussi Timonen (2001–02, 2008–17) Canada Ryan Wilson,2018-2020
