= Aleksi Elorinne =

Finnish professional ice hockey player

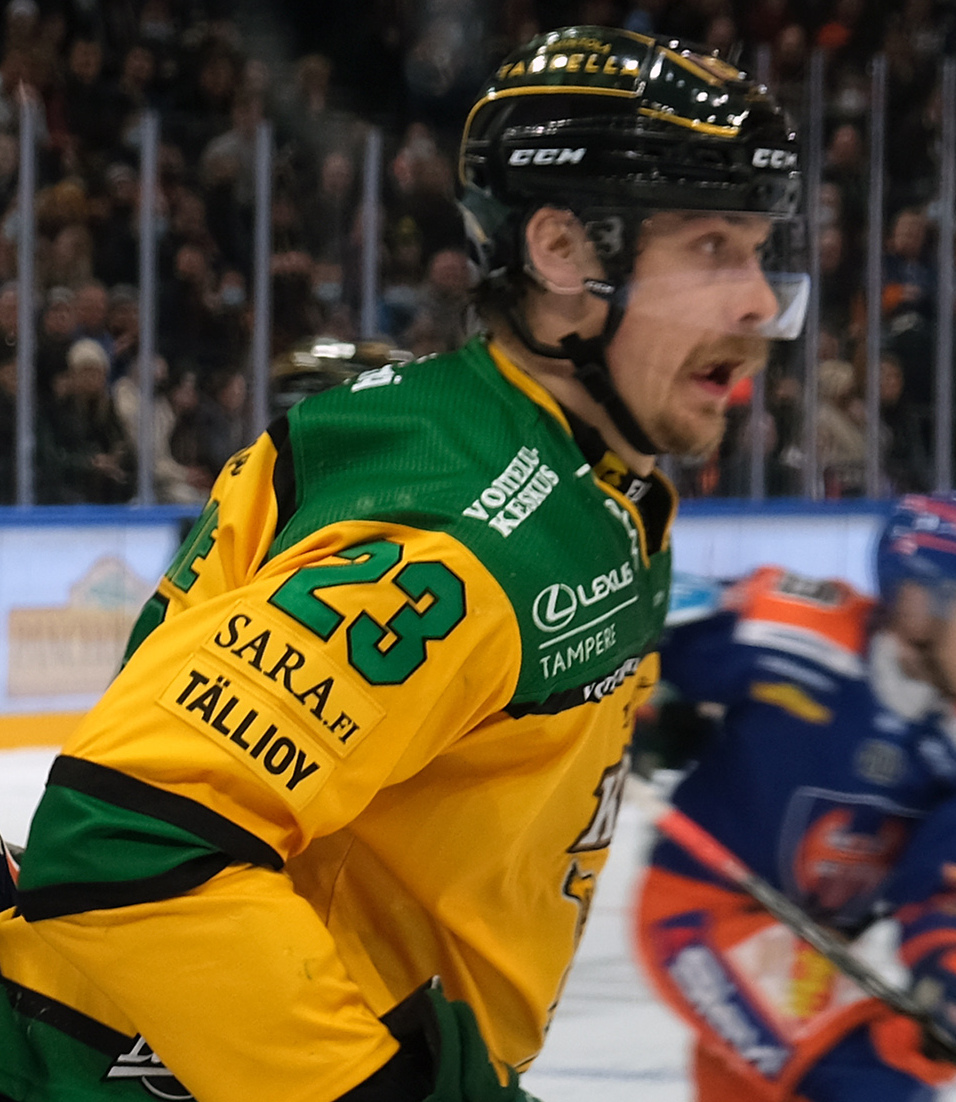
- Born: 3 February 1990 (age 35); Joensuu, Finland
- Height: 6 ft 5 in (196 cm)
- Weight: 218 lb (99 kg; 15 st 8 lb)
- Position: Defence
- Shoots: Left
- Liiga team Former teams: Kuopion Kalpa; Tappara; Ilves
- Playing career: 2010–present

Aleksi Elorinne (born 3 February 1990) is a Finnish professional ice hockey player who is currently playing with Dragons de Rouen in the Ligue Magnus (FRA). He has formerly played with Tappara and Ilves in the Finnish Liiga.
