= Aleksi Matinmikko =

Finnish ice hockey player

- Born: March 6, 2000 (age 25) Oulu, Finland
- Height: 181 cm (5 ft 11 in)
- Weight: 82 kg (181 lb; 12 st 13 lb)
- Position: Defenceman
- Shoots: Right
- Liiga team Former teams: Porin Ässät; Kiekko-Espoo
- Playing career: 2020–present

Aleksi Matinmikko (born 6 March 2000) is a Finnish ice hockey defenceman who plays for Porin Ässät in Liiga. Matinmikko can also play as a forward.

== Career ==
In the years 2019-2020 Aleksi Matinmikko played 27 games in Ässät putting up 1 point.
