= 2023–24 Champions Hockey League =

European ice hockey tournament

Tournament details
- Dates: 31 August 2023 – 20 February 2024
- Teams: 24

Final positions
- Champions: (Switzerland) Genève-Servette HC (1st title)
- Runners-up: (Sweden) Skellefteå AIK

Tournament statistics
- Games played: 101
- Goals scored: 580 (5.74 per game)
- Attendance: 350,937 (3,475 per game)
- Scoring leader: (Czech Republic) Dominik Lakatoš (12 points)

Awards
- MVP: (Finland) Sami Vatanen

The 2023–24 Champions Hockey League was the ninth season of the Champions Hockey League, a European ice hockey tournament. The tournament was competed by 24 teams, with qualification being on sporting merits only. Apart from the reigning champion, the six founding leagues were represented by three teams each, while five "challenge leagues" were represented by one team each.

Swiss team Genève-Servette HC won their first Champions Hockey League title, defeating Swedish team Skellefteå AIK 3–2 in the final. This made Genève-Servette HC the first Swiss side to win the title. The title holders Tappara finished 18th in the regular season and did not qualify for the playoffs.

Czech left forward Dominik Lakatoš from Czech team Vítkovice Ridera became the top scorer with 12 points.

== Format changes ==
Starting from the 2023–24 season the format was changed. The number of teams was reduced from 32 to 24 teams. The group stage was replaced with the regular season in which teams played six games each, with the teams being ranked in overall standings and 16 best-ranked teams advancing to the playoffs.

In the regular season draw, teams were allocated into four pots featuring six teams each. The seeding depends on the teams’ achievements in their national leagues and the respective league’s standing in the CHL league ranking. Each team was drawn against two teams from each of the other three pots.

In the playoffs, teams formed pairs based on the overall regular season standings.

For the first time since the 2015–16 season, the IIHF Continental Cup winners did not get a wild card spot.

== Team allocation ==
A total of 24 teams from different European first-tier leagues were scheduled to participate in the league. Besides the title holders Tappara, 18 teams from the six founding leagues, as well as the national champions from Denmark, France, Norway, Slovakia and the United Kingdom participated.

The qualification criteria for national leagues was based on the following rules:

1. CHL champions
2. National league champions (play-off winners)
3. Regular season winners
4. Regular season runners-up
5. Regular season third-placed team

Note: the national league champions of the United Kingdom are distinct from the national champions, who are determined in play-offs following the regular season. In 2023, Belfast Giants won both competitions.

=== Teams ===
Team	City/Area	League	Qualification	Participation	Previous best
(Finland) Tappara	Tampere	Liiga	2023 CHL winners	9th	Champion
(Sweden) Växjö Lakers	Växjö	Swedish Hockey League	Play-off winners	7th	Final
(Sweden) Skellefteå AIK	Skellefteå	Swedish Hockey League	Regular season runners-up	8th	Semi-finals
(Sweden) Färjestad BK	Karlstad	Swedish Hockey League	Regular season third	6th	Round of 16
(Switzerland) Genève-Servette HC	Geneva	National League	Play-off winners	3rd	Round of 16
(Switzerland) EHC Biel-Bienne	Biel/Bienne	National League	Regular season runners-up	2nd	Quarter-finals
(Switzerland) SC Rapperswil-Jona Lakers	Rapperswil	National League	Regular season third	2nd	Group stage
(Germany) Red Bull München	Munich	Deutsche Eishockey Liga	Play-off winners	8th	Final
(Germany) ERC Ingolstadt	Ingolstadt	Deutsche Eishockey Liga	Regular season runners-up	4th	Round of 32
(Germany) Adler Mannheim	Mannheim	Deutsche Eishockey Liga	Regular season third	7th	Round of 16
(Finland) Ilves	Tampere	Liiga	Regular season runners-up	2nd	Group stage
(Finland) Lukko	Rauma	Liiga	Regular season third	5th	Semi-finals
(Finland) Pelicans	Lahti	Liiga	Regular season fourth	2nd	Group stage
(Austria) Red Bull Salzburg	Salzburg	ICE Hockey League	Play-off winners	8th	Semi-finals
(Italy) HC Bolzano	Bolzano	ICE Hockey League	Regular season winners	4th	Round of 16
(Austria) HC Innsbruck	Innsbruck	ICE Hockey League	Regular season third	1st	First appearance
(Czech Republic) Oceláři Třinec	Třinec	Czech Extraliga	Play-off winners	8th	Semi-finals
(Czech Republic) Dynamo Pardubice	Pardubice	Czech Extraliga	Regular season winners	4th	Group stage
(Czech Republic) Vítkovice Ridera	Ostrava	Czech Extraliga	Regular season runners-up	4th	Quarter-finals
(France) Dragons de Rouen	Rouen	Ligue Magnus	Play-off winners	4th	Quarter-finals
(Norway) Stavanger Oilers	Stavanger	Fjordkraftligaen	Play-off winners	6th	Round of 32
(Denmark) Aalborg Pirates	Aalborg	Metal Ligaen	Play-off winners	3rd	Group stage
(United Kingdom) Belfast Giants	Belfast	Elite Ice Hockey League	Regular season winners	3rd	Group stage
(Slovakia) HC Košice	Košice	Slovak Extraliga	Play-off winners	4th	Round of 32

== Round and draw dates ==
The schedule of the competition was as follows.

Phase	Round	Draw date	First leg	Second leg
Group stage	Matchday 1	24 May 2023	31 August–1 September 2023	
Group stage	Matchday 2	24 May 2023	2–3 September 2023	
Group stage	Matchday 3	24 May 2023	7–8 September 2023	
Group stage	Matchday 4	24 May 2023	9–10 September 2023	
Group stage	Matchday 5	24 May 2023	10–11 October 2023	
Group stage	Matchday 6	24 May 2023	17–18 October 2023	
Playoff	Round of 16	No draw	14–15 November 2023	21–22 November 2023
Playoff	Quarter-finals	No draw	5–6 December 2023	12 December 2023
Playoff	Semi-finals	No draw	9–10 January 2024	16–17 January 2024
Playoff	Final	No draw	20 February 2024	

== Regular season ==
Teams in the 2023–24 Champions Hockey League.

In the regular season the 24 teams were combined into one table. Each team played home and away against six different opponents once. The best sixteen teams qualified to the round of 16.

The draw of the regular season took place on 24 May 2023 in Tampere, Finland.

=== Pots ===
The participating teams were seeded into Pots A to D according to their achievements in their national leagues and their respective league’s standing in the CHL league ranking. The reigning CHL champions Tappara were the top seeded team and therefore given a place in pot A. The top pot also contained the reigning champions of four of the top five founding leagues according to the league rankings (Sweden, Switzerland, Germany and ICE Hockey League), as well as 2022–23 Liiga regular season runners-up.

Pot A	Pot B	Pot C	Pot D
(Finland) Tappara (Sweden) Växjö Lakers (Switzerland) Genève-Servette HC (Germany) Red Bull München (Finland) Ilves (Austria) Red Bull Salzburg	(Czech Republic) Oceláři Třinec (Sweden) Skellefteå AIK (Switzerland) EHC Biel-Bienne (Germany) ERC Ingolstadt (Finland) Lukko (Italy) HC Bolzano	(Czech Republic) Dynamo Pardubice (Sweden) Färjestad BK (Switzerland) SC Rapperswil-Jona Lakers (Germany) Adler Mannheim (Finland) Pelicans (Austria) HC Innsbruck	(Czech Republic) Vítkovice Ridera (France) Dragons de Rouen (Norway) Stavanger Oilers (Denmark) Aalborg Pirates (United Kingdom) Belfast Giants (Slovakia) HC Košice

=== Grid ===
Teams were allocated their opponents based on a pattern in connection to the positions in the regular season grid. They played the teams on the left-hand side at home and the ones on the right-hand side away excluding teams from the same row. Teams from the last column played teams from the first column away, and teams from the first column played teams from the last column at home.

A1	(Finland) Tappara	A2	(Germany) Red Bull München	A3	(Sweden) Växjö Lakers	A4	(Finland) Ilves	A5	(Austria) Red Bull Salzburg	A6	(Switzerland) Genève-Servette HC
B1	(Finland) Lukko	B2	(Switzerland) EHC Biel-Bienne	B3	(Czech Republic) Oceláři Třinec	B4	(Germany) ERC Ingolstadt	B5	(Italy) HC Bolzano	B6	(Sweden) Skellefteå AIK
C1	(Austria) HC Innsbruck	C2	(Switzerland) SC Rapperswil-Jona Lakers	C3	(Sweden) Färjestad BK	C4	(Finland) Pelicans	C5	(Czech Republic) Dynamo Pardubice	C6	(Germany) Adler Mannheim
D1	(Slovakia) HC Košice	D2	(Denmark) Aalborg Pirates	D3	(Czech Republic) Vítkovice Ridera	D4	(Norway) Stavanger Oilers	D5	(France) Dragons de Rouen	D6	(United Kingdom) Belfast Giants

=== League table ===
Pos	Team	Pld	W	OTW	OTL	L	GF	GA	GD	Pts	Qualification
1	(Germany) Adler Mannheim	6	5	0	1	0	21	9	+12	16	Qualification to playoffs
2	(Sweden) Växjö Lakers	6	4	2	0	0	29	13	+16	16	Qualification to playoffs
3	(Finland) Lukko	6	5	0	0	1	21	14	+7	15	Qualification to playoffs
4	(Sweden) Färjestad BK	6	4	1	0	1	26	11	+15	14	Qualification to playoffs
5	(Sweden) Skellefteå AIK	6	4	0	0	2	18	11	+7	12	Qualification to playoffs
6	(Finland) Ilves	6	3	1	1	1	22	18	+4	12	Qualification to playoffs
7	(Switzerland) Genève-Servette HC	6	3	1	0	2	25	14	+11	11	Qualification to playoffs
8	(Finland) Pelicans	6	3	1	0	2	23	15	+8	11	Qualification to playoffs
9	(Czech Republic) Vítkovice Ridera	6	2	2	1	1	19	14	+5	11	Qualification to playoffs
10	(Germany) Red Bull München	6	3	0	1	2	22	16	+6	10	Qualification to playoffs
11	(Czech Republic) Dynamo Pardubice	6	3	0	1	2	20	14	+6	10	Qualification to playoffs
12	(Czech Republic) Oceláři Třinec	6	3	0	1	2	21	17	+4	10	Qualification to playoffs
13	(Switzerland) EHC Biel-Bienne	6	3	0	1	2	19	17	+2	10	Qualification to playoffs
14	(Austria) HC Innsbruck	6	3	0	0	3	18	26	−8	9	Qualification to playoffs
15	(Germany) ERC Ingolstadt	6	3	0	0	3	13	22	−9	9	Qualification to playoffs
16	(Switzerland) SC Rapperswil-Jona Lakers	6	2	1	1	2	21	22	−1	9	Qualification to playoffs
17	(United Kingdom) Belfast Giants	6	2	1	0	3	10	13	−3	8	
18	(Finland) Tappara	6	1	2	0	3	18	17	+1	7	
19	(France) Dragons de Rouen	6	2	0	0	4	16	26	−10	6	
20	(Austria) Red Bull Salzburg	6	1	0	1	4	9	17	−8	4	
21	(Norway) Stavanger Oilers	6	1	0	1	4	14	25	−11	4	
22	(Italy) HC Bolzano	6	0	0	1	5	7	26	−19	1	
23	(Denmark) Aalborg Pirates	6	0	0	1	5	9	31	−22	1	
24	(Slovakia) HC Košice	6	0	0	0	6	9	22	−13	0	

Source: Champions Hockey League

=== Regular season tie-breaking criteria ===
Teams were ranked according to points (3 points for a win in regulation time, 2 points for a win in overtime, 1 point for a loss in overtime, 0 points for a loss in regulation time). If two or more teams were tied on points, the following tiebreaking criteria was applied, in the order given, to determine the rankings (see 8.4.4. Tie breaking formula group stage standings):

1. Greater number of wins in regulation time (3 point wins);
2. Greater number of wins in total (regulation time wins + overtime and shootout wins);
3. Better goal difference;
4. More goals scored;
5. More away goals scored;
6. The higher position in the CHL Draw pot allocation.

=== Results ===
Home \ Away	AAL	MAN	BEL	BIE	BOL	ROU	PAR	FBK	GEN	ILV	ING	INN	KOŠ	LUK	TŘI	PEL	RJL	RBM	RBS	SKE	STA	TAP	VÄX	VÍT
Aalborg Pirates												4–6		2–6								1–2		
Adler Mannheim					4–2	3–2													3–2					
Belfast Giants					4–0		3–2												1–0					
EHC Biel-Bienne												6–1	3–1									6–3		
HC Bolzano										1–7						3–4					0–1			
Dragons de Rouen										6–1	3–5					3–8								
Dynamo Pardubice										1–3	6–1										5–1			
Färjestad BK	8–0			4–1														4–2						
Genève-Servette HC					6–1	9–1	3–2																	
Ilves								3–4							5–4									3–2
ERC Ingolstadt								3–2															2–5	0–5
HC Innsbruck			2–1						5–2											2–4				
HC Košice		1–4							2–3											1–2				
Lukko		0–6	3–1						3–2															
Oceláři Třinec	4–0																6–7	0–2						
Pelicans															1–3								1–5	4–0
SC Rapperswil-Jona Lakers													5–2	2–5								4–2		
Red Bull München												9–2	5–2	1–4										
Red Bull Salzburg											1–2					1–5					5–2			
Skellefteå AIK						0–1	3–4												4–0					
Stavanger Oilers								2–4							2–4								6–7	
Tappara		2–1	6–0																	3–5				
Växjö Lakers	5–2			4–0													3–2							
Vítkovice Ridera				4–3													4–1	4–3						

Source: Champions Hockey League
Legend: Blue = home team win; Red = away team win.
Matches with lighter background shading were decided after overtime.

== Playoffs ==
=== Format ===
In the playoffs, pairings were formed based on the positions of the teams in the regular season as follows: the team finished 1st in the regular season face the team finished 16th, the team finished 2nd face the team finished 15th, and so on. There were no play-off draw or any reseedings for the quarter-finals and semi-finals. In each round except the final, the teams play two games and the aggregate score decides which team advances. The first leg was hosted by the team with the lower seed with the second leg being played on the home ice of the other team. If aggregate score was tied, a sudden death overtime follows. If the overtime was scoreless, the team who wins the shoot out competition advances.

The final was played on the home ice of the team with the higher accumulative ranking across the entire campaign, including play-off games.

=== Bracket ===
Round of 16
16	(Switzerland) SC Rapperswil-Jona Lakers	4	3	7
1	(Germany) Adler Mannheim	1	1	2
8	(Finland) Pelicans	0	1	1
9	(Czech Republic) Vítkovice Ridera	3	1	4
13	(Switzerland) EHC Biel-Bienne	3	4	7
4	(Sweden) Färjestad BK	5	6	11
12	(Czech Republic) Oceláři Třinec	4	2	6
5	(Sweden) Skellefteå AIK	3	5	8
15	(Germany) ERC Ingolstadt	1	3	4
2	(Sweden) Växjö Lakers	4	3	7
10	(Germany) Red Bull München	3	1	4
7	(Switzerland) Genève-Servette HC	2	3	5
14	(Austria) HC Innsbruck	2	1	3
3	(Finland) Lukko (OT)	2	2	4
6	(Finland) Ilves	1	2	3
11	(Czech Republic) Dynamo Pardubice	3	2	5

Quarter-finals
16	(Switzerland) SC Rapperswil-Jona Lakers	2	1	3
9	(Czech Republic) Vítkovice Ridera	1	5	6
4	(Sweden) Färjestad BK	4	1	5
5	(Sweden) Skellefteå AIK	3	4	7
2	(Sweden) Växjö Lakers	1	3	4
7	(Switzerland) Genève-Servette HC	4	2	6
3	(Finland) Lukko	6	2	8
11	(Czech Republic) Dynamo Pardubice	4	3	7

Semi-finals
9	(Czech Republic) Vítkovice Ridera	2	2	4
5	(Sweden) Skellefteå AIK	4	1	5
7	(Switzerland) Genève-Servette HC	2	3	5
3	(Finland) Lukko	2	2	4

Final
5	(Sweden) Skellefteå AIK	2
7	(Switzerland) Genève-Servette HC	3

=== Round of 16 ===
The first legs were played on 14 and 15 November with return legs played on 21 and 22 November 2023.

Team 1	Agg.	Team 2	1st leg	2nd leg
SC Rapperswil-Jona Lakers (Switzerland)	7–2	(Germany) Adler Mannheim	4–1	3–1
ERC Ingolstadt (Germany)	4–7	(Sweden) Växjö Lakers	1–4	3–3
HC Innsbruck (Austria)	3–4 (OT)	(Finland) Lukko	2–2	1–2
EHC Biel-Bienne (Switzerland)	7–11	(Sweden) Färjestad BK	3–5	4–6
Oceláři Třinec (Czech Republic)	6–8	(Sweden) Skellefteå AIK	4–3	2–5
Ilves (Finland)	3–5	(Czech Republic) Dynamo Pardubice	1–3	2–2
Red Bull München (Germany)	4–5	(Switzerland) Genève-Servette HC	3–2	1–3
Pelicans (Finland)	1–4	(Czech Republic) Vítkovice Ridera	0–3 (w/o)	1–1

The first game took place at the venue of the higher-seeded team, rather than at the venue of the lower-seeded team, as the rules required.
The first game between Pelicans and Vítkovice Ridera on 14 November was cancelled due to poor ice conditions at Isku Areena, Lahti, Finland. Vítkovice Ridera was awarded the win per league's sports regulations.

==== (1) Adler Mannheim vs. (16) SC Rapperswil-Jona Lakers ====
14 November 2023; 19:45 CET	SC Rapperswil-Jona Lakers (Switzerland)	4–1 (2–1, 0–0, 2–0)	(Germany) Adler Mannheim	St. Galler Kantonalbank Arena, Rapperswil; Attendance: 3,515

Game reference

Melvin Nyffeler
Goalies
Felix Brückmann
Referees:
Manuel Nikolić
Michał Baca
Linesmen:
Eric Cattaneo
Sébastien Duc

Schroeder (Moy, Červenka) (PP) – 7:44	1–0
	1–1	11:19 – Vey (Mayer, Wolf)
Wetter (Frk, Rask) – 17:11	2–1
Schroeder (Jensen, Capaul) – 44:24	3–1
Frk (Rask) – 58:21	4–1

6 min
Penalties
4 min
21
Shots
21

21 November 2023; 19:30 CET	Adler Mannheim (Germany)	1–3 (0–1, 0–1,1–1)	(Switzerland) SC Rapperswil-Jona Lakers	SAP Arena, Mannheim; Attendance: 3,812

Game reference

Arno Tiefensee
Goalies
Melvin Nyffeler
Referees:
Antonín Jeřábek
Daniel Pražák
Linesmen:
Kai Jürgens
Patrick Laguzov

	0–1	1:51 – Wetter (Grossniklaus, Frk)
	0–2	30:09 – Schroeder (Jensen, Aebischer)
Plachta (Jokipakka, Ennis) (PP) – 44:09	1–2
	1–3	58:49 – (ENG) Dünner (Capaul)

6 min
Penalties
6 min
35
Shots
29

SC Rapperswil-Jona Lakers won 7–2 on aggregate.

==== (2) Växjö Lakers vs. (15) ERC Ingolstadt ====
14 November 2023; 18:30 CET	ERC Ingolstadt (Germany)	1–4 (0–2, 1–2, 0–0)	(Sweden) Växjö Lakers	Saturn Arena, Ingolstadt; Attendance: 2,654

Game reference

Devin Williams
Goalies
Adam Åhman
Referees:
Lukas Kohlmüller
Daniel Soos
Linesmen:
Tim Heffner
Andreas Hofer

	0–1	3:11 – Rieder
	0–2	10:29 – Carlsson (Martinsson Rosén)
Pietta (St. Denis, Henriquez-Morales) – 20:35	1–2
	1–3	26:52 – Stjernborg (Gustafsson)
	1–4	29:17 – McLaughlin (Cooper, Rosén)

6 min
Penalties
2 min
32
Shots
31

21 November 2023; 18:00 CET	Växjö Lakers (Sweden)	3–3 (2–1, 0–0, 1–2)	(Germany) ERC Ingolstadt	Vida Arena, Växjö; Attendance: 2,771

Game reference

Adam Åhman
Goalies
Devin Williams
Referees:
Micha Hebeisen
Cedric Borga
Linesmen:
Ludvig Lundgren
Anders Nyqvist

*Kossila (Sylvegård, Persson) (PP) – 8:11	1–0
	1–1	14:57 – Edwards (Krauß, Nijenhuis)
McLaughlin (Rosén, Martinsson) – 19:42	2–1
	2–2	42:38 – Bodie (Hüttl, Pietta)
	2–3	45:49 – Krauß (Rowe, Bertrand)
Nilsson (Sylvegård) (ENG) – 57:44	3–3

4 min
Penalties
4 min
20
Shots
27

Växjö Lakers won 7–4 on aggregate.

==== (3) Lukko vs. (14) HC Innsbruck ====
14 November 2023; 20:20 CET	HC Innsbruck (Austria)	2–2 (0–2, 1–0, 1–0)	(Finland) Lukko	Tiroler Wasserkraft Arena, Innsbruck; Attendance: 2,000

Game reference

Evan Buitenhuis
Goalies
Daniel Lebedeff
Referees:
Marian Rohatsch
Chris van Grinsven
Linesmen:
David Nothegger
Simon Riecken

	0–1	11:52 – Burke (Repo, Mattila)
	0–2	17:14 – Repo (Burke, Almari)
Shaw (Green, Krogsgaard) – 39:45	1–2
Shaw (Mackin, Green) – 54:19	2–2

4 min
Penalties
4 min
17
Shots
21

22 November 2023; 18:30 EET	Lukko (Finland)	2–1 (OT) (1–0, 0–0, 0–1) (OT 1–0)	(Austria) HC Innsbruck	Kivikylän Areena, Rauma; Attendance: 1,602

Game reference

Daniel Lebedeff
Goalies
Evan Buitenhuis
Referees:
Michael Tscherrig
Jiří Ondráček
Linesmen:
Luka Mäkinen
Lauri Nikulainen

Westerholm (Stenqvist, Westerholm) – 1:09	1–0
	1–1	56:17 – (PP) Albano (Rockwood)
Reunanen (Repo, Mattila) – 60:19	2–1

6 min
Penalties
10 min
47
Shots
12

Lukko won 4–3 on aggregate in Overtime.

==== (4) Färjestad BK vs. (13) EHC Biel-Bienne ====
14 November 2023; 19:45 CET	EHC Biel-Bienne (Switzerland)	3–5 (1–1, 1–3, 1–1)	(Sweden) Färjestad BK	Tissot Arena, Biel/Bienne; Attendance: 3,533

Game reference

Harri Säteri
Goalies
Maxime Lagacé
Referees:
Lasse Kopitz
Uldis Buss
Linesmen:
Dario Fuchs
Aurélien Urfer

Rajala (Bukarts) – 11:15	1–0
	1–1	16:00 – Lundh (Westfält, Tornberg)
	1–2	24:45 – Ejdsell (Kellman, Bergkvist)
Brunner (Rathgeb, Kessler) (PP) – 31:13	2–2
	2–3	31:59 – (PP) Ejdsell (Nyström, Kellman)
	2–4	36:58 – Tornberg (Westfält, Forsell)
	2–5	43:51 – Lindqvist (Lawner, Johansson)
Yakovenko (Sallinen) (PP) – 52:00	3–5

4 min
Penalties
8 min
30
Shots
30

21 November 2023; 19:00 CET	Färjestad BK (Sweden)	6–4 (2–0, 2–2, 2–2)	(Switzerland) EHC Biel-Bienne	Löfbergs Arena, Karlstad; Attendance: 2,397

Game reference

Maxime Lagacé
Goalies
Joren van Pottelberghe
Referees:
Riku Brander
Kristian Vikman
Linesmen:
Gustav Jonsson
Daniel Persson

Forsell (Westfält, Dahlström) – 7:09	1–0
Lindqvist (Bergkvist, Lawner) – 11:28	2–0
	2–1	24:22 – (PP) Sallinen (Bukarts, Kessler)
Kellman (Johansson, Lindqvist) (PP) – 25:46	3–1
	3–2	37:38 – Kessler
Johansson (Nygård (SH) – 38:49	4–2
	4–3	44:08 – Pokka (Sallinen, Bachofner)
Dahlström (Nygård) – 54:10	5–3
Nygård (Johansson) (SHENG) – 56:40	6–3
	6–4	57:10 – Burren (Stampfli, Reichle)

8 min
Penalties
2 min
22
Shots
24

Färjestad BK won 11–7 on aggregate.

==== (5) Skellefteå AIK vs. (12) Oceláři Třinec ====
14 November 2023; 18:00 CET	Oceláři Třinec (Czech Republic)	4–3 (2–0, 0–1, 2–2)	(Sweden) Skellefteå AIK	Werk Arena, Třinec; Attendance: 3,547

Game reference

Ondřej Kacetl
Goalies
Gustaf Lindvall
Referees:
Tomáš Hronský
Martin Christensen
Linesmen:
Jiří Svoboda
Josef Špůr

Jeřábek (Vrána) – 1:41	1–0
Růžička (Dańo, Jeřábek) (PP) – 13:03	2–0
	2–1	24:46 – Lindström (Hugg)
Kurovský (Čacho, Dravecký) – 44:54	3–1
	3–2	46:15 – Forsfjäll (Stenman, Dzierkals)
	3–3	52:21 – (PP) Sikura (Lindström, Lindholm)
Hudáček (Nestrašil, Polášek) – 56:06	4–3

8 min
Penalties
6 min
15
Shots
26

21 November 2023; 18:00 CET	Skellefteå AIK (Sweden)	5–2 (1–1, 2–0, 2–1)	(Czech Republic) Oceláři Třinec	Skellefteå Kraft Arena, Skellefteå; Attendance: 1,892

Game reference

David Rautio
Goalies
Ondřej Kacetl
Referees:
Mikko Kaukokari
Joonas Kova
Linesmen:
Rasmus Strömberg
Emil Yletyinen

	0–1	3:19 – (PP) Jeřábek (Růžička, Dańo)
Lindholm (Pudas, Sandberg) – 13:43	1–1
Lindholm (Pudas, Sandberg) – 30:59	2–1
Sikura (Johnson) – 39:20	3–1
	3–2	43:56 – Pánik
Lindholm (Nilsson, Johnson) (PP) – 51:15	4–2
Salomonsson (Heikkinen, Lindberg) – 55:19	5–2

6 min
Penalties
4 min
30
Shots
20

Skellefteå AIK won 8–6 on aggregate.

==== (6) Ilves vs. (11) Dynamo Pardubice ====
15 November 2023; 18:30 EET	Ilves (Finland)	1–3 (1–1, 0–2, 0–0)	(Czech Republic) Dynamo Pardubice	Nokia Arena, Tampere; Attendance: 3,538

Game reference

Jakub Málek
Goalies
Roman Will
Referees:
Marcus Linde
Kilian Hinterdobler
Linesmen:
Onni Hautamaki
Jussi Thomann

Meskanen (Stránský, Ratinen) (PP) – 10:49	1–0
	1–1	17:39 – Radil (Zohorna, Vála)
	1–2	21:35 – Zohorna (Kousal, Radil)
	1–3	34:14 – Radil (Kousal, Zohorna)

2 min
Penalties
6 min
25
Shots
24

21 November 2023; 17:30 CET	Dynamo Pardubice (Czech Republic)	2–2 (0–1, 1–1, 1–0)	(Finland) Ilves	Enteria Arena, Pardubice; Attendance: 4,597

Game reference

Roman Will
Goalies
Jonas Gunnarsson
Referees:
Gordon Schukies
Ladislav Smetana
Linesmen:
Josef Špůr
Jiří Ondráček

	0–1	7:36 – Ikonen (Mäntykivi, Ratinen)
Kaut (Čerešňák, Hyka) (PP) – 22:40	1–1
	1–2	25:13 – Suomi (Lancaster, Nyman)
Musil (Vála, Kaut) – 42:13	2–2

8 min
Penalties
8 min
36
Shots
22

Dynamo Pardubice won 5–3 on aggregate.

==== (7) Genève-Servette HC vs. (10) Red Bull München ====
15 November 2023; 19:30 CET	Red Bull München (Germany)	3–2 (2–0, 0–0, 1–2)	(Switzerland) Genève-Servette HC	Olympia Eishalle, Munich; Attendance: 3,027

Game reference

Mathias Niederberger
Goalies
Robert Mayer
Referees:
Christian Ofner
Daniel Soos
Linesmen:
Marius Wölzmüller
Joshua Römer

Krämmer (Eder, Blum) – 4:58	1–0
DeSousa (Kastner) – 5:30	2–0
	2–1	47:54 – Manninen (Hartikainen, Vatanen)
Smith (Abeltshauser, Varejcka) – 52:20	3–1
	3–2	58:09 – Winnik (Lennström)

4 min
Penalties
10 min
32
Shots
18

22 November 2023; 19:45 CET	Genève-Servette HC (Switzerland)	3–1 (0–1, 1–0, 2–0)	(Germany) Red Bull München	Patinoire des Vernets, Geneva; Attendance: 5,527

Game reference

Robert Mayer
Goalies
Mathias Niederberger
Referees:
Mikael Holm
Mikael Sjöqvist
Linesmen:
Dominik Altmann
Dominik Schlegel

	0–1	19:49 – MacWilliam (DeSousa, Kastner)
Hartikainen (Richard, Le Coultre) (PP) – 35:55	1–1
Jooris (Vatanen, Filppula) – 47:39	2–1
Richard – 50:57	3–1

6 min
Penalties
8 min
38
Shots
21

Genève-Servette HC won 5–4 on aggregate.

==== (9) Vítkovice Ridera vs. (8) Pelicans ====
14 November 2023; 18:30 EET	Pelicans (Finland)	0–3	(Czech Republic) Vítkovice Ridera	Isku Areena, Lahti

Game reference

21 November 2023; 18:00 CET	Vítkovice Ridera (Czech Republic)	1–1 (1–0, 0–0, 0–1)	(Finland) Pelicans	Ostravar Aréna, Vítkovice; Attendance: 4,007

Game reference
Matěj Machovský	Goalies	Jasper Patrikainen	Referees: Tomáš Hronský; Marek Žák; Linesmen: Vít Lederer; Lukáš Rampír
Lakatoš (Kalus, Mueller) (PP) - 19:49 / 1–0; / 1–1 / 44:10 - (PP) Schnarr (Roine, Král)			Referees: Tomáš Hronský; Marek Žák; Linesmen: Vít Lederer; Lukáš Rampír
10 min	Penalties	6 min	Referees: Tomáš Hronský; Marek Žák; Linesmen: Vít Lederer; Lukáš Rampír
31	Shots	30	Referees: Tomáš Hronský; Marek Žák; Linesmen: Vít Lederer; Lukáš Rampír

Vítkovice Ridera won 4–1 on aggregate.

=== Quarter-finals ===
First legs were played on 5 and 6 December with return legs played on 12 December 2023.

Team 1	Agg.	Team 2	1st leg	2nd leg
Genève-Servette HC (Switzerland)	6–4	(Sweden) Växjö Lakers	4–1	2–3
Dynamo Pardubice (Czech Republic)	7–8	(Finland) Lukko	4–6	3–2
Skellefteå AIK (Sweden)	7–5	(Sweden) Färjestad BK	3–4	4–1
SC Rapperswil-Jona Lakers (Switzerland)	3–6	(Czech Republic) Vítkovice Ridera	2–1	1–5

==== (2) Växjö Lakers vs. (7) Genève-Servette HC ====
5 December 2023; 19:45 CET	Genève-Servette HC (Switzerland)	4–1 (3–0, 1–0, 0–1)	(Sweden) Växjö Lakers	Patinoire des Vernets, Geneva; Attendance: 3,494

Game reference

Robert Mayer
Goalies
Adam Åhman
Referees:
Adam Kika
Jiří Ondráček
Linesmen:
Dominik Altmann
Dominik Schlegel

Filppula (Pouliot, Berni) – 3:07	1–0
Berni (Manninen, Praplan) – 4:56	2–0
Richard (Winnik, Mirandą) – 18:53	3–0
Praplan (Filppula, Richard) (PP) – 35:28	4–0
	4–1	57:59 – Rieder (Ågren, Giuttari)

2 min
Penalties
6 min
23
Shots
29

12 December 2023; 19:00 CET	Växjö Lakers (Sweden)	3–2 (0–0, 1–0, 2–2)	(Switzerland) Genève-Servette HC	Vida Arena, Växjö; Attendance: 1,752

Game reference

Emil Larmi
Goalies
Jussi Olkinuora
Referees:
Riku Brander
Mikko Kaukokari
Linesmen:
Anders Nyqvist
Ludvig Lundgren

Nilsson (Blichfeld) – 35:26	1-0
	1-1	44:40 – Vatanen (Manninen, Jooris)
	1-2	46:36 – (SH) Manninen (Jooris)
Kossila (Blichfeld, Persson) (PP, EA) – 48:53	2-2
Rosén (Persson, Sylvegård) (PP, EA) – 49:31	3-2

8 min
Penalties
6 min
36
Shots
33

Genève-Servette HC won 6–4 on aggregate.

==== (3) Lukko vs. (11) Dynamo Pardubice ====
6 December 2023; 20:00 CET	Dynamo Pardubice (Czech Republic)	4–6 (2–4, 0–1, 2–1)	(Finland) Lukko	Enteria Arena, Pardubice; Attendance: 4,129

Game reference

Roman Will
Goalies
Daniel Lebedeff
Referees:
Michael Tscherrig
Stefan Hürlimann
Linesmen:
Daniel Hynek
Jiří Svoboda

	0–1	1:36 – Almari (Tieksola, (Abt)
	0–2	3:02 – Tieksola (Repo, Reunanen)
	0–3	9:01 – Nieminen
	0–4	16:08 – Fontaine (Abt, Tieksola)
Radil (Sedlák) (PP) – 17:54	1–4
Košťálek (Kousal (PP) – 19:08, Zohorna)	2–4
	2–5	29:14 – Westerholm (Westerholm)
	2–6	53:46 – Burke (Mattila)
Mandát (Vála) – 55:05	3–6
Kousal (Radil, Čerešňák) – 57:05	4–6

14 min
Penalties
12 min
39
Shots
21

12 December 2023; 18:30 EET	Lukko (Finland)	2–3 (0–0, 2–1, 0–2)	(Czech Republic) Dynamo Pardubice	Kivikylän Areena, Rauma; Attendance: 3,172

Game reference

Samuel Harvey
Goalies
Roman Will
Referees:
Marcus Linde
Manuel Nikolić
Linesmen:
Tommi Niittylä
Joni Pekkala

Kainulainen (Ikonen, Reunanen) – 23:22	1–0
	1–1	33:49 – (PP) Čerešňák (Radil, Sedlák)
Kainulainen (Reunanen) – 38:50	2–1
	2–2	57:17 – (EA) Musil (Košťálek, Radil)
	2–3	58:22 – (EA) Hyka (Říčka, Paulovič)

10 min
Penalties
4 min
14
Shots
42

Lukko won 8–7 on aggregate.

==== (4) Färjestad BK vs. (5) Skellefteå AIK ====
5 December 2023; 19:00 CET	Skellefteå AIK (Sweden)	3–4 (1–1, 0–2, 2–1)	(Sweden) Färjestad BK	Skellefteå Kraft Arena, Skellefteå; Attendance: 3,417

Game reference

Referees:
Tobias Björk
Mikael Holm
Linesmen:
Ludvig Lundgren
Emil Yletyinen

	0–1	6:27 – (PSG) Ejdsell
Forsfjäll (Salomonsson, Stenman) – 11:24	1–1
	1–2	34:18 – Ejdsell
	1–3	38:20 – Kellman (Bergkvist, Nygren)
	1–4	50:13 – Öhgren (Kellman, Tomášek)
Lindström (Lindholm, Nilsson) (PP) – 51:44	2–4
Sandin-Pellika (Hugg) – 54:00	3–4

6 min
Penalties
6 min
27
Shots
15

12 December 2023; 19:00 CET	Färjestad BK (Sweden)	1–4 (1–1, 0–0, 0–3)	(Sweden) Skellefteå AIK	Löfbergs Arena, Karlstad; Attendance: 4,837

Game reference

Maxime Lagacé
Goalies
Linus Söderström
Referees:
Linus Öhlund
Mikael Nord
Linesmen:
Emil Yletyinen
Gustav Jonsson

	0–1	4:40 – Sikura (Lindholm, Johnson)
Johansson (Ejdsell, Kellman) (PP) – 11:07	1–1
	1–2	50:08 – Stenman (Dzierkals, Sandin-Pellika)
	1–3	54:20 – Nilsson (Sikura, Lindholm)
	1–4	58:14 (SHG, ENG) – Nilsson

4 min
Penalties
8 min
27
Shots
30

Skellefteå AIK won 7–5 on aggregate.

==== (9) Vítkovice Ridera vs. (16) SC Rapperswil-Jona Lakers ====
5 December 2023; 19:45 CET	SC Rapperswil-Jona Lakers (Switzerland)	2–1 (2–1, 0–0, 0–0)	(Czech Republic) Vítkovice Ridera	St. Galler Kantonalbank Arena, Rapperswil; Attendance: 2,933

Game reference

Robin Meyer
Goalies
Lukáš Klimeš
Referees:
André Schrader
Marian Rohatsch
Linesmen:
Eric Cattaneo
Nathy Burgy

	0–1	1:07- Barinka (Fridrich, Mikuš)
Vouardoux (Jensen, Moy) –13:19	1–1
Rask (Dünner, Lammer) (PP) – 16:16	2–1

4 min
Penalties
4 min
31
Shots
31

12 December 2023; 18:00 CET	Vítkovice Ridera (Czech Republic)	5–1 (0–1, 3–0, 2–0)	(Switzerland) SC Rapperswil-Jona Lakers	Ostravar Aréna, Vítkovice; Attendance: 4,055

Game reference

Matěj Machovský
Goalies
Robin Meyer
Referees:
Ladislav Smetana
Marek Žák
Linesmen:
Jiří Ondráček
Petr Šimánek

	0–1	3:01 – Lammer (Wick)
Zdráhal (Barinka, Jeřábek) – 24:32	1–1
Vondráček (Kovář, Kreiger) – 29:31	2–1
Vondráček (Grman, Mikuš) – 35:36	3–1
Vondráček (Raskob, Zdráhal) (PP) – 53:46	4–1
Lakatoš (Kalus) (ENG) – 59:49	5–1

4 min
Penalties
4 min
37
Shots
30

Vítkovice Ridera won 6–3 on aggregate.

=== Semi-finals ===
First legs will be played on 9 January with return legs played on 16 January 2024.

Team 1	Agg.	Team 2	1st leg	2nd leg
Genève-Servette HC (Switzerland)	5–4	(Finland) Lukko	2–2	3–2
Vítkovice Ridera (Czech Republic)	4–5	(Sweden) Skellefteå AIK	2–4	2–1

==== (3) Lukko vs. (7) SC Genève-Servette HC ====
9 January 2024; 20:15 CET	Genève-Servette HC (Switzerland)	2–2 (1–0, 1–2, 0–0)	(Finland) Lukko	Patinoire des Vernets, Geneva; Attendance: 4,371

Game reference

Jussi Olkinuora
Goalies
Daniel Lebedeff

Linesmen:
Dario Fuchs
Michael Stalder

Miranda (Praplan, Honka) – 8:14	1–0
	1–1	24:34 – Mattila (Abt, Jandric)
	1–2	26:39 – Fontaine (Tieksola, Burke)
Chanton (Miranda) – 29:02	2–2

4 min
Penalties
2 min
23
Shots
19

16 January 2024; 20:30 EET	Lukko (Finland)	2–3 (2–0, 0–2, 0–1)	(Switzerland) Genève-Servette HC	Kivikylän Areena, Rauma; Attendance: 4,322

Game reference

Christopher Gibson
Goalies
Jussi Olkinuora

Linesmen:
Lauri Nikulainen
Luka Mäkinen

Stenqvist (Ikonen) – 6:00	1–0
Burke (Brook) – 11:15	2–0
	2–1	36:49 – Filppula (Hartikainen, Le Coultre)
	2–2	37:47 – Vatanen (Hartikainen)
	2–3	45:05 – Filppula (Vatanen, Chanton)

2 min
Penalties
4 min
21
Shots
31

Genève-Servette won 5–4 on aggregate.

==== (5) Skellefteå AIK vs. (9) Vítkovice Ridera ====
9 January 2024; 18:00 CET	Vítkovice Ridera (Czech Republic)	2–4 (2–2, 0–1, 0–1)	(Sweden) Skellefteå AIK	Ostravar Aréna, Vítkovice; Attendance: 5,455

Game reference

Lukáš Klimeš
Goalies
Linus Söderström
Referees:
Michael Tscherrig
André Schrader
Linesmen:
Jiří Svoboda
Daniel Hynek

	0–1	5:26 – Lindström (Granberg, Lindholm)
Lakatoš (Bukarts, Kalus) (PP) – 7:08	1–1
Dej – 9:20	2–1
	2–2	11:32 – (SHG) Dzierkals
	2–3	25:06 – Lindholm (Sikura, Hugg)
	2–4	44:01 – Sikura (Nilsson, Johnson)

4 min
Penalties
10 min
31
Shots
25

16 January 2024; 19:00 CET	Skellefteå AIK (Sweden)	1–2 (1–0, 0–1, 0–1)	(Czech Republic) Vítkovice Ridera	Skellefteå Kraft Arena, Skellefteå; Attendance: 4,029

Game reference

Linus Söderström
Goalies
Matěj Machovský
Referees:
Joonas Kova
Kristian Vikman
Linesmen:
Ludvig Lundgren
Emil Yletyinen

Salomonsson (Hugg, Robertsson) – 5:43	1–0
	1–1	32:53 – (PP) Barinka (Raskob, Chlán)
	1–2	41:38 – Kalus (Claireaux, Vondráček)

6 min
Penalties
4 min
27
Shots
32

Skellefteå AIK won 5–4 on aggregate.

=== Final ===
20 February 2024; 19:30 CET	Genève-Servette HC (Switzerland)	3–2 (3–1, 0–0, 0–1)	(Sweden) Skellefteå AIK	Patinoire des Vernets, Geneva; Attendance: 7,135

Game reference

Jussi Olkinuora
Goalies
Linus Söderström
Referees:
Mikko Kaukokari
Joonas Kova
Linesmen:
Josef Špůr
Jiří Svoboda

Berthon (Jacquemet, Jooris) – 5:30	1–0
	1–1	Dzierkals (Lindholm, Forsfjäll) – 11:35
Manninen (Hartikainen, Filppula) (PP) – 17:37	2–1
Winnik (Berni, Praplan) (PP) – 18:36	3–1
	3–2	Heikkinen (Lindberg, Nilsson) – 48:09

6 min
Penalties
4 min
15
Shots
25

== Statistics ==
=== Scoring leaders ===
The following players led the league in points.

Player	Team	GP	G	A	PTS	PIM	+/–	GWG	PPG	SHG	SOG	S%
(Czech Republic) Dominik Lakatoš	(Czech Republic) Vítkovice Ridera	11	7	5	12	8	–3	2	4	0	34	20.59%
(Finland) Sami Vatanen	(Switzerland) Genève-Servette HC	13	3	9	12	4	+7	0	0	0	47	6.38%
(Switzerland) Tanner Richard	(Switzerland) Genève-Servette HC	13	2	10	12	2	+8	0	0	0	24	8.33%
(Slovakia) Libor Hudáček	(Czech Republic) Oceláři Třinec	7	5	6	11	0	–1	1	1	0	22	22.73%
(Sweden) Linus Lindström	(Sweden) Skellefteå AIK	13	6	5	11	2	+10	1	1	1	31	19.35%
(Finland) Teemu Hartikainen	(Switzerland) Genève-Servette HC	13	4	7	11	12	+3	0	1	0	30	13.33%
(United States) Jonathon Blum	(Germany) Red Bull München	7	1	9	10	0	+8	0	0	0	11	9.09%
(Canada) Braeden Shaw	(Austria) HC Innsbruck	8	6	4	10	6	+5	1	2	0	26	23.08%
(United States) Dylan McLaughlin	(Sweden) Växjö Lakers	9	5	5	10	2	-1	2	1	0	12	41.67%
(Canada) Brayden Burke	(Finland) Lukko	10	6	4	10	0	+4	1	0	0	14	42.86%

=== Leading goaltenders ===
The following goaltenders led the league in save percentage, provided that they have played at least 40% of their team's minutes.

Player	Team	GP	W	L	SV	GA	SV%	GAA	SO	MIN
(Czech Republic) Matěj Machovský	(Czech Republic) Vítkovice Ridera	6	4	1	178	6	96.74%	0.99	1	364
(Finland) Jasper Patrikainen	(Finland) Lahti Pelicans	3	2	0	83	4	95.40%	1.36	1	177
(Canada) Tyler Beskorowany	(United Kingdom) Belfast Giants	6	3	3	160	12	93.02%	2.01	2	358
(Germany) Felix Brückmann	(Germany) Adler Mannheim	4	3	1	87	7	92.55%	1.75	1	240
(Finland) Daniel Lebedeff	(Finland) Lukko	8	6	0	184	15	92.46%	1.88	0	480

=== Home Game and Overall ===
As of 20 February 2024

Pos.	Team	Regular season		Playoffs		Overall			2022–23 average
Pos.	Team	Matches	Attendance	Matches	Attendance	Matches	Total	Average	2022–23 average
1	(Germany) Adler Mannheim	3	23,227	1	3,812	4	27,039	6,760	–
2	(Northern Ireland) Belfast Giants	3	15,807	0	—	3	15,807	5,269	3,018
3	(Switzerland) Genève-Servette HC	3	14,680	4	20,527	7	35,207	5,030	–
4	(Czech Republic) Dynamo Pardubice	3	15,264	2	8,726	5	23,990	4,798	–
5	(Czech Republic) Vítkovice Ridera	3	13,088	3	13,517	6	26,605	4,434	–
6	(Finland) Ilves	3	13,719	1	3,538	4	17,257	4,314	4,601
7	(Finland) Tappara	3	12,132	0	–	3	12,132	4,044	4,747
8	(Switzerland) EHC Biel-Bienne	3	12,279	1	3,533	4	15,812	3,953	–
9	(Switzerland) SC Rapperswil-Jona Lakers	3	12,466	2	6,448	5	18,914	3,783	3,683
10	(Czech Republic) Oceláři Třinec	3	9,639	1	3,547	4	13,186	3,297	2,233
11	(France) Dragons de Rouen	3	9,805	0	–	3	9,805	3,268	–
12	(Sweden) Skellefteå AIK	3	9,699	3	9,338	6	19,037	3,173	2,488
13	(Slovakia) HC Košice	3	9,248	0	—	3	9,248	3,083	–
14	(Finland) Lukko	3	8,754	3	9,096	6	17,850	2,975	–
15	(Germany) ERC Ingolstadt	3	8,763	1	2,654	4	11,417	2,854	–
16	(Germany) Red Bull München	3	8,144	1	3,027	4	11,171	2,793	2,625
17	(Sweden) Färjestad BK	3	6,474	2	7,234	5	13,708	2,742	1,935
18	(Sweden) Växjö Lakers	3	8,568	2	4,523	5	13,091	2,618	–
19	(Norway) Stavanger Oilers	3	7,434	0	—	3	7,434	2,478	2,400
20	(Austria) HC Innsbruck	3	6,800	1	2,000	4	8,800	2,200	–
21	(Italy) HC Bolzano	3	6,345	0	–	3	6,345	2,115	–
22	(Denmark) Aalborg Pirates	3	6,093	0	—	3	6,093	2,031	1,763
23	(Austria) Red Bull Salzburg	3	5,195	0	–	3	5,195	1,732	1,749
24	(Finland) Pelicans	3	5,794	1	0	4	5,794	1,449	–
Tournament total		72	249,417	29	101,520	101	350,937	3,475	2,840

== Awards ==
=== Team of the Regular Season ===
The Team of the Regular Season was announced on 2 November 2023.

Position	Player	Team
Goaltender	(Canada) Tyler Beskorowany	(United Kingdom) Belfast Giants
Defenceman	(Finland) Sami Vatanen	(Switzerland) Genève-Servette HC
Defenceman	(United States) Les Lancaster	(Finland) Ilves
Forward	(Slovakia) Libor Hudáček	(Czech Republic) Oceláři Třinec
Forward	(Finland) Aatu Jämsen	(Finland) Pelicans
Forward	(Sweden) Pär Lindholm	(Sweden) Skellefteå AIK

=== MVP ===
The winner of the LGT MVP Award was announced on 20 February 2024.

Player	Team
(Finland) Sami Vatanen	(Switzerland) Genève-Servette HC

=== Team of the Season ===
The Team of the Season was announced on 11 March 2024.

Position	Player	Team
Goaltender	(Finland) Jussi Olkinuora	(Finland) Pelicans / (Switzerland) Genève-Servette HC
Defenceman	(Finland) Sami Vatanen	(Switzerland) Genève-Servette HC
Defenceman	(Finland) Tarmo Reunanen	(Finland) Lukko
Forward	(Czech Republic) Dominik Lakatoš	(Czech Republic) Vítkovice Ridera
Forward	(Sweden) Linus Lindström	(Sweden) Skellefteå AIK
Forward	(Canada) Braeden Shaw	(Austria) HC Innsbruck
