= Vatanen =

Vatanen is a Finnish surname. Notable people with the surname include:

- Ari Vatanen (born 1952), Finnish rally driver and politician
- Jussi Vatanen (1875–1936), Finnish politician
- Sami Vatanen (born 1991), Finnish ice hockey player
