= Champions Hockey League =

European ice hockey tournament

- Current season, competition or edition: 2026–27 Champions Hockey League
- Formerly: European Trophy; Champions Hockey League
- Sport: Ice hockey
- Founded: 2013
- Founder: IIHF
- First season: 2014–15
- CEO: Jörgen Lindgren
- Claim to fame: EICC
- No. of teams: 24
- Countries: 13
- Continent: Europe
- Most recent champion: Frölunda HC (5 titles) (2025–26)
- Most titles: Frölunda HC (5 titles)
- Broadcasters: Austria: Laola1.tv (online livestream); Brazil: ESPN; Canada: TSN; Central America: TD Centro; Czech Republic: Sport1; Europe: Eurosport; Finland: MTV; France: Fanseat; Germany: Sport1 (TV), Laola1.tv and DAZN (online livestream); Great Britain: Viaplay; Hungary: Sport1; Lithuania: Sport1; Mexico: Televisa Deportes Network; Romania: TVR 1; Serbia: Arena Sport; Slovakia: Sport1; South America: DirecTV; Sweden: SVT; Switzerland: SRG SSR and Teleclub; Turkey: Sportstv; USA: NHL Network
- Related competitions: IIHF Continental Cup
- Website: championshockeyleague.com

The Champions Hockey League is a European first-level ice hockey tournament. Launched in the 2014–15 season by 26 clubs, 6 leagues and the International Ice Hockey Federation (IIHF), the tournament features top teams from leagues across Europe. Since the 2023–24 season, the competition has featured a 24-club league stage, followed by a 16-team playoffs to decide the champion.

== Background ==
The IIHF launched a tournament with the same name in 2008 to coincide with the IIHF's 100th anniversary. The tournament's only season was played between 8 October 2008 and 28 January 2009, and was won by the ZSC Lions who got to play in the 2009 Victoria Cup game as a result. The IIHF planned to launch another season but was ultimately forced to cancel the tournament due to problems finding sponsors during the concurrent global economic crisis and failure to agree on a tournament format. On 9 December 2013, a new tournament with the same name was launched by the IIHF and a group of 26 clubs from six countries, born out of the European Trophy, starting in the 2014–15 season.

== Seasons ==
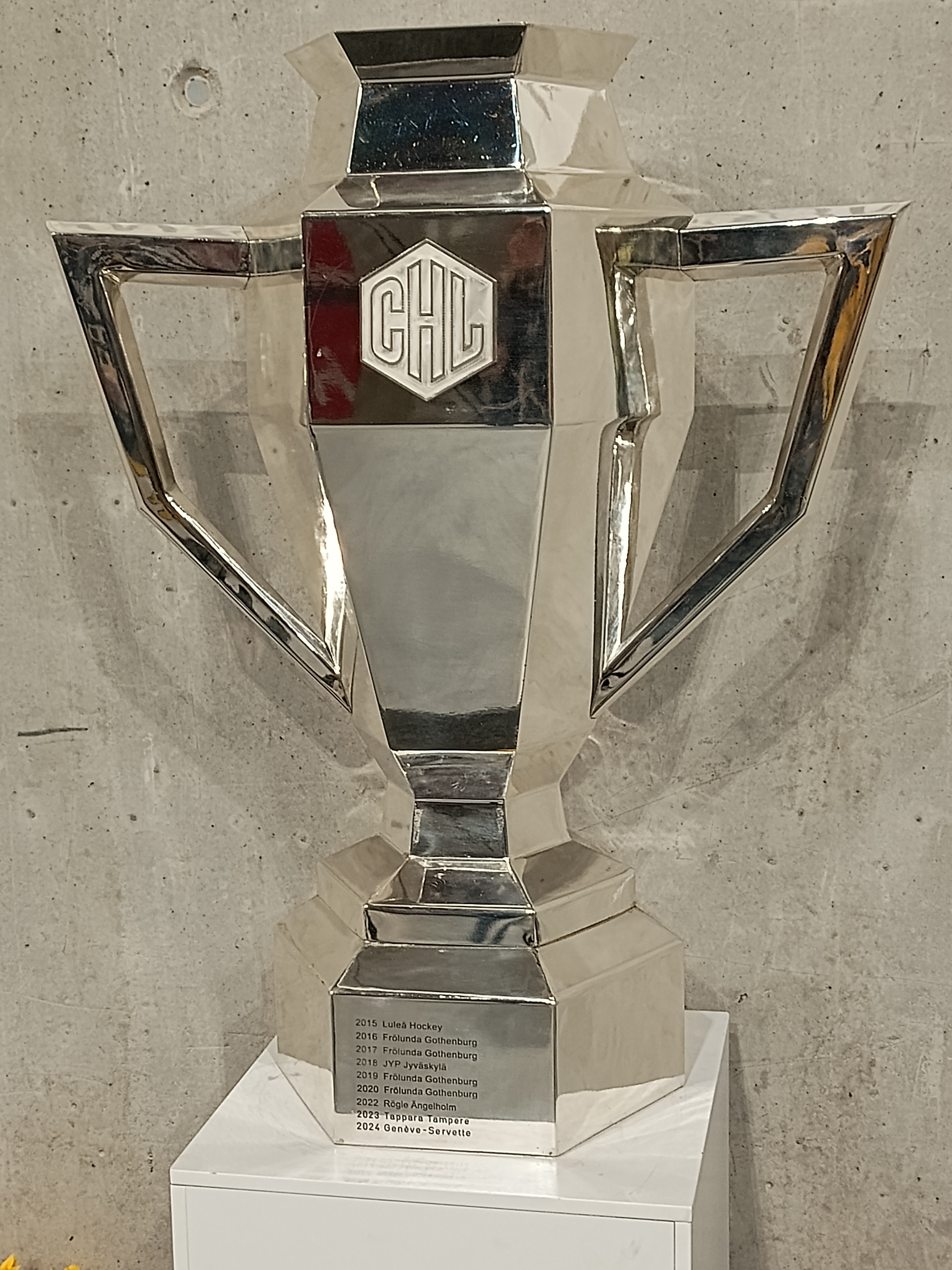
CHL trophy (2024)

=== Overview ===
#	Season	Teams	Games	Avg. att.	Champion	Runner-up	Semi-finalists
1	2014–15	44	161	3,049	Luleå HF	Frölunda HC	Oulun Kärpät, Skellefteå AIK
2	2015–16	48	157	3,261	Frölunda HC	Oulun Kärpät	HC Davos, Lukko
3	2016–17	48	157	3,240	Frölunda HC	Sparta Praha	HC Fribourg-Gottéron, Växjö Lakers
4	2017–18	32	125	3,369	JYP	Växjö Lakers	HC Oceláři Třinec, HC Bílí Tygři Liberec
5	2018–19	32	125	3,400	Frölunda HC	EHC Red Bull München	HC Plzeň, EC Red Bull Salzburg
6	2019–20	32	125	3,446	Frölunda HC	Mountfield HK	Djurgårdens IF, Luleå HF
—	2020–21	Cancelled due to the COVID-19 pandemic					
7	2021–22	32	123	1,988^{[a]}	Rögle BK	Tappara	Frölunda HC, EHC Red Bull München
8	2022–23	32	125	2,841	Tappara	Luleå HF	EV Zug, Frölunda HC
9	2023–24	24	101	3,475	Genève-Servette HC	Skellefteå AIK	Lukko, Vítkovice Ridera
10	2024–25	24	101	4,070	ZSC Lions	Färjestad BK	Genève-Servette HC, Sparta Praha
11	2025–26	24	101	3,557	Frölunda HC	Luleå HF	EV Zug, Brynäs IF
12	2026–27	24					

Note:

- ^{a} Some matches had capacity restrictions due to the COVID-19 pandemic.

=== 2014–15 season ===
The 2014–15 season was played between August 2014 and February 2015. 44 clubs from 12 European countries participated in the season, divided into 11 groups of four teams each. Each team played a double round-robin in their group, for a total of 6 games per team. The 11 group winners as well as the top five group runners-up qualified for the playoffs. The playoffs were as a single-elimination tournament, with all rounds leading to the final played in two-game, home-and-away, total-goal series. The final was a single game. In total, 161 games were played, including the group and playoff stages. The season was won by Luleå HF which defeated Frölunda HC in the final.

=== 2015–16 season ===
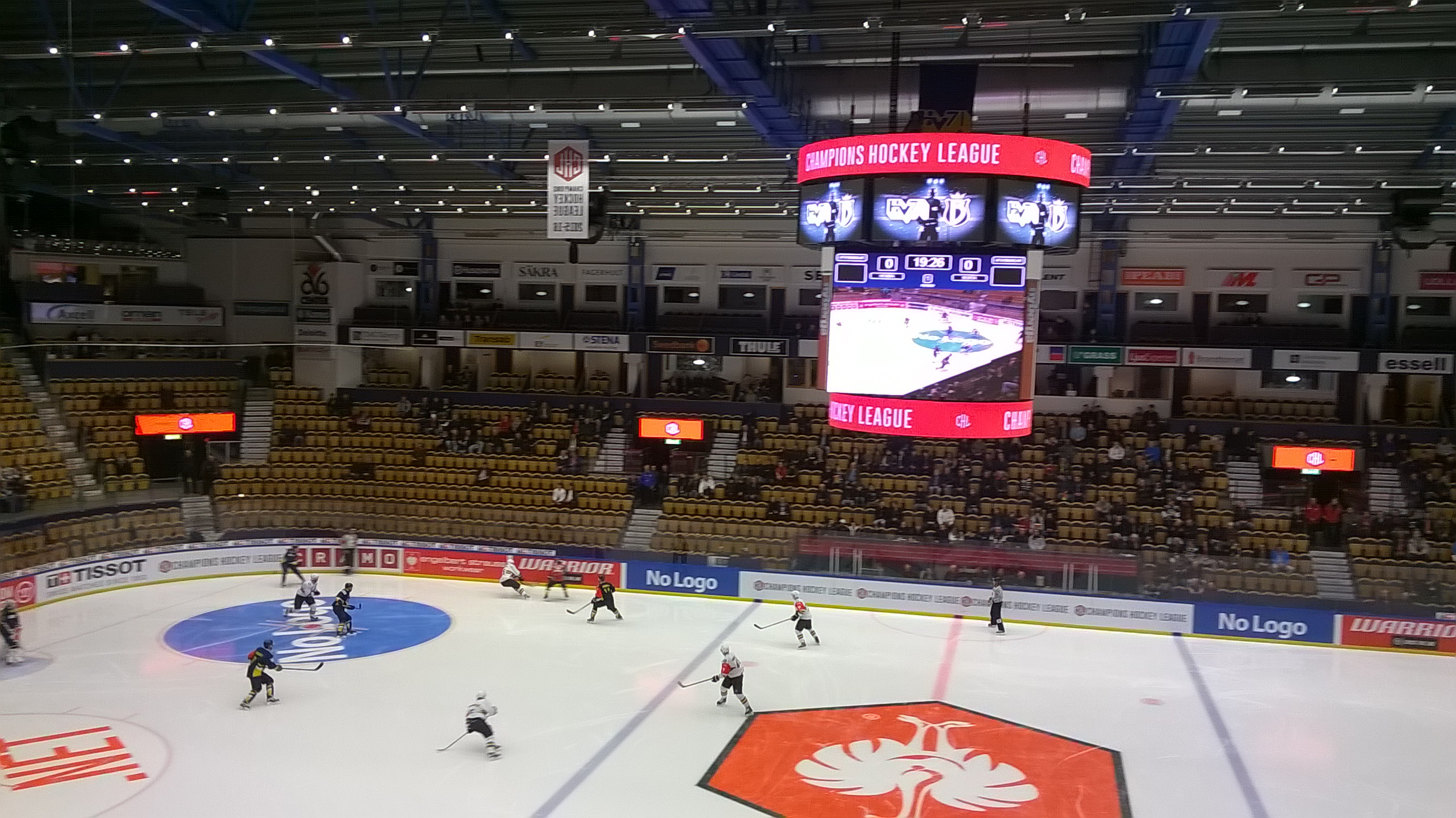
A CHL match in Husqvarna Garden (HV71 vs. Espoo Blues) in 2015

For the 2015–16 season, the tournament was expanded to 48 teams, divided into 16 groups with three teams in each group. The two first teams in each group advanced to the playoff round of 32. The 48 teams consisted of the 26 founding A-licence clubs, 12 B-licensed clubs from the founding leagues, and 10 C-licensed "Wild card" teams from other leagues. In total, 157 games were played. Frölunda HC won their first Champions League title by beating Oulun Kärpät in the final.

=== 2016–17 season ===
The 2016–17 season was once more played with 48 teams, using the same format as in the previous season. The season started on 16 August 2016 and ended with the final game on 7 February 2017 with Frölunda defeating Sparta Prague, 4–3 in overtime.

=== 2017–18 season ===
Starting with the fourth CHL season, the championship was reduced to 32 teams, and qualification was on sporting merits only. The six founding leagues were represented by between three and five teams (based on a three-year league ranking), while eight teams from the "challenge leagues" were represented by one team each. No founding team was qualified automatically.

Finnish side JYP Jyväskylä won the title defeating Swedish team Växjö Lakers 2–0.

=== 2018–19 season ===
The fifth CHL season was contested by 32 teams, and qualification was on sporting merits only. The six founding leagues were represented by between three and five teams (based on a four-year league ranking), while seven "challenge leagues" were represented by one team each. One place was awarded to the Continental Cup champion. Unlike in the first three editions, founding teams did not automatically qualify. The group stages began on 30 August 2018, and ended on 17 October 2018. The season had an average attendance of 3,401 per game, one percent increase from the previous season.

Swedish team Frölunda HC won their third Champions Hockey League title, defeating Red Bull München, the first German team to reach the final, 3–1 at the Scandinavium in Gothenburg.

=== 2019–20 season ===
The sixth CHL season had 32 teams competing, and qualification was again on sporting merits only. The six founding leagues were represented by between three and five teams (based on a three-year league ranking), while seven "challenge leagues" were represented by one team each. One place was awarded to the champion of the 2018–19 Champions Hockey League as well as a wild card spot selected by the board.

Swedish team Frölunda HC successfully defended their Champions Hockey League title, defeating Czech team Mountfield HK 3–1 in the final to win the European Trophy for a fourth time. For the first time in the history of the league, the final was held in the Czech Republic as Mountfield HK earned the right to host the game at ČPP Arena.

=== 2020–21 season ===
The season was cancelled due to COVID-19 pandemic in Europe.

=== 2021–22 season ===
The seventh CHL season had 32 teams competing with qualification being on sporting merits only. The six founding leagues were represented by between three and five teams (based on a three-year league ranking) while seven "challenge leagues" were represented by their national champions. One place was awarded to the champion of the 2019–20 Champions Hockey League as well as two wild card spots selected by the board to replace the national champions of Belarus and Slovakia. The season was marked by participation of the first Ukrainian team, HC Donbass.

Swedish team Rögle BK in their debut season beat Finnish team Tappara 2–1 in the final at their home Catena Arena in Ängelholm to win the European Trophy for the first time.

=== 2022–23 season ===
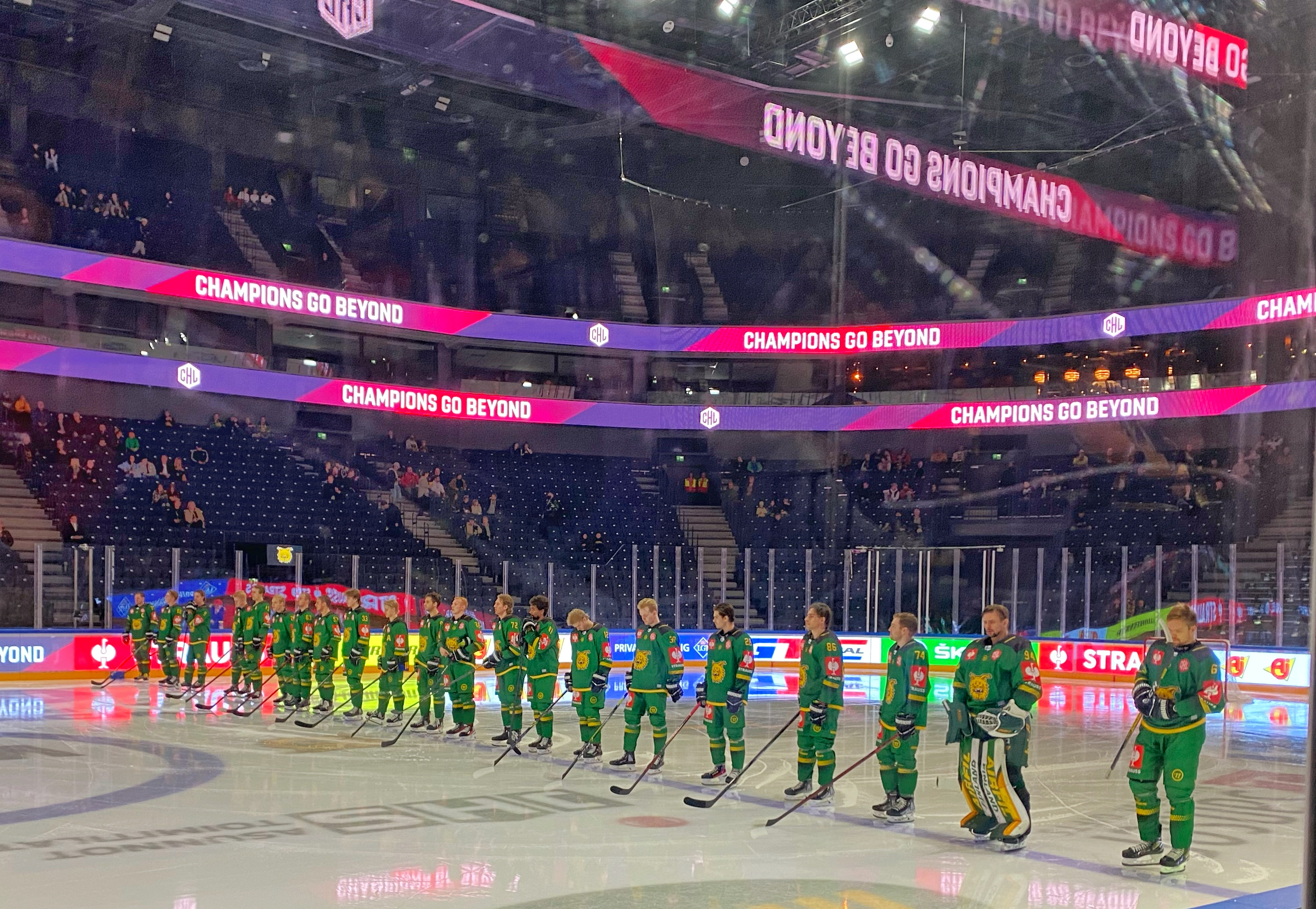
Ilves in Nokia Arena (Tampere)

The eighth CHL season had 32 teams competing with qualification being on sporting merits only. The six founding leagues were represented by between three and five teams (based on a four-year league ranking) while seven "challenge leagues" were represented by their national champions. One place each was awarded to the champions of the 2021–22 Champions Hockey League and 2021–22 Continental Cup, as well as one wild card spot selected by the board to replace the Ukrainian champion HC Donbass. This season was marked by the participation of the first Hungarian and Slovenian teams, with Fehérvár AV19 and Olimpija Ljubljana joining the competition.

Finnish team Tappara defeated Swedish team Luleå HF 3–2 in the final at Coop Norrbotten Arena in Luleå to win the European Trophy for the first time.

=== 2023–24 season ===
For the ninth CHL season the format was changed. The tournament was reduced to 24 teams, with qualification being on sporting merits only. Apart from the reigning champion, the six founding leagues were represented by three teams each, while five "challenger leagues" were represented by one team each. The group stage was replaced with the regular season in which teams played six games each, with the teams being ranked in overall standings and 16 best-ranked teams advancing to the playoffs. For the first time since the 2015–16 season, the IIHF Continental Cup winners did not get a wild card spot.

Swiss team Genève-Servette HC won their first Champions Hockey League title, defeating Swedish team Skellefteå AIK 3–2 in the final. This made Genève-Servette HC the first Swiss and also the first non-Nordic club to win the title. This season also saw the highest attendance of any CHL season to date, finally continuing the upward trend that the competition was on before the COVID-19 pandemic.

=== 2024–25 season ===
The 2024–25 season was the tenth anniversary season of the CHL. The format was the same as the 2023–24 season, with 24 teams including the reigning champion, three teams from each of the six founding leagues and one team from each of five "challenger leagues." Teams qualified on sporting merits only. Each team played six games in the league stage, with the top 16 qualifying for the playoffs. Färjestad BK finished the league stage at the top of the table.

ZSC Lions won their first Champions Hockey League title, beating Färjestad in the final 2–1 in the final. This marked the second consecutive season where a Swiss team won the title, after Genève-Servette won the competition the year before, after eight seasons without a non-Nordic champion. ZSC's Sven Angrighetto was the season's top scorer, with 22 points, and won the competition's Most Valuable Player award.

=== 2025–26 season ===
For the 11th season, the format was the same as the last two. The competition featured 24 teams, qualifying on sporting merits only. The reigning champion automatically qualified, and the six founding leagues were represented by three teams each, alongside five teams from "challenger leagues" represented by one team each.

Frölunda HC won the 2025–26 title, their fifth ever, defeating fellow Swedish side Luleå HF 3–2 in overtime in the final. EV Zug forward Grégory Hofmann was the competition's top scorer, with 13 points in 11 games. Frölunda forward Max Friberg took home the MVP award.

=== 2026–27 season ===
The 2026–27 season will be the 12th season of the CHL, again featuring 24 teams qualifying on sporting merits only. As of 23 March 2026, the full list of teams is still yet to be entirely confirmed

== Teams and format ==
Teams in the 2026–27 Champions Hockey League.

In the first three years of the competition, the 26 founding teams had guaranteed spots in the group stage ("A license"). Additional teams from the founding league, that qualified based on sporting merits ("B license") and the champions from other European leagues ("C license") completed the field.

Starting in the 2017–18 season, 32 teams again participated in the group stage, with 24 of the entries coming from the six founding leagues (Swedish Hockey League, Finnish Liiga, Swiss National League A, Czech Extraliga, German DEL and Austrian/international ICEHL) and all berths being earned through on-ice achievement: the "founding clubs" were no longer guaranteed a place in the competition. A maximum of five teams from each country were permitted, with the entries allotted to each country according to a coefficient system (best two leagues got five berths, next two got four, last two got three). The remaining eight places were given to the champions of the Norwegian, Slovak, French, Belarusian, Danish, British and Polish leagues, as well as the champion of the Continental Cup. The teams were then drawn into eight groups of four, with the top two teams in each group advancing to the knockout stage, which was contested as two-legged ties until a one-match final.

The current competition format was introduced for the 2023–24 season. The number of teams was reduced to 24, allocated as follows:

- The previous CHL season's champions
- 3 teams representing the Swedish Hockey League
- 3 teams representing the Finnish Liiga
- 3 teams representing the Swiss National League
- 3 teams representing the Czech Extraliga
- 3 teams representing the Deutsche Eishockey Liga
- 3 teams representing the Austrian ICE Hockey League
- 5 wild card teams from various European leagues (maximum of 1 wild card per league)

The group stage was replaced with the regular season in which teams played six games each, with the teams being ranked in overall standings. The 16 best-ranked teams advance to the playoff, where they are seeded according to the overall regular season standings. Play-off series are played over two games (home and away) with aggregate scoring. The final is one game played at the home stadium of the team with the overall best record.

== Records and statistics ==
=== Winners ===
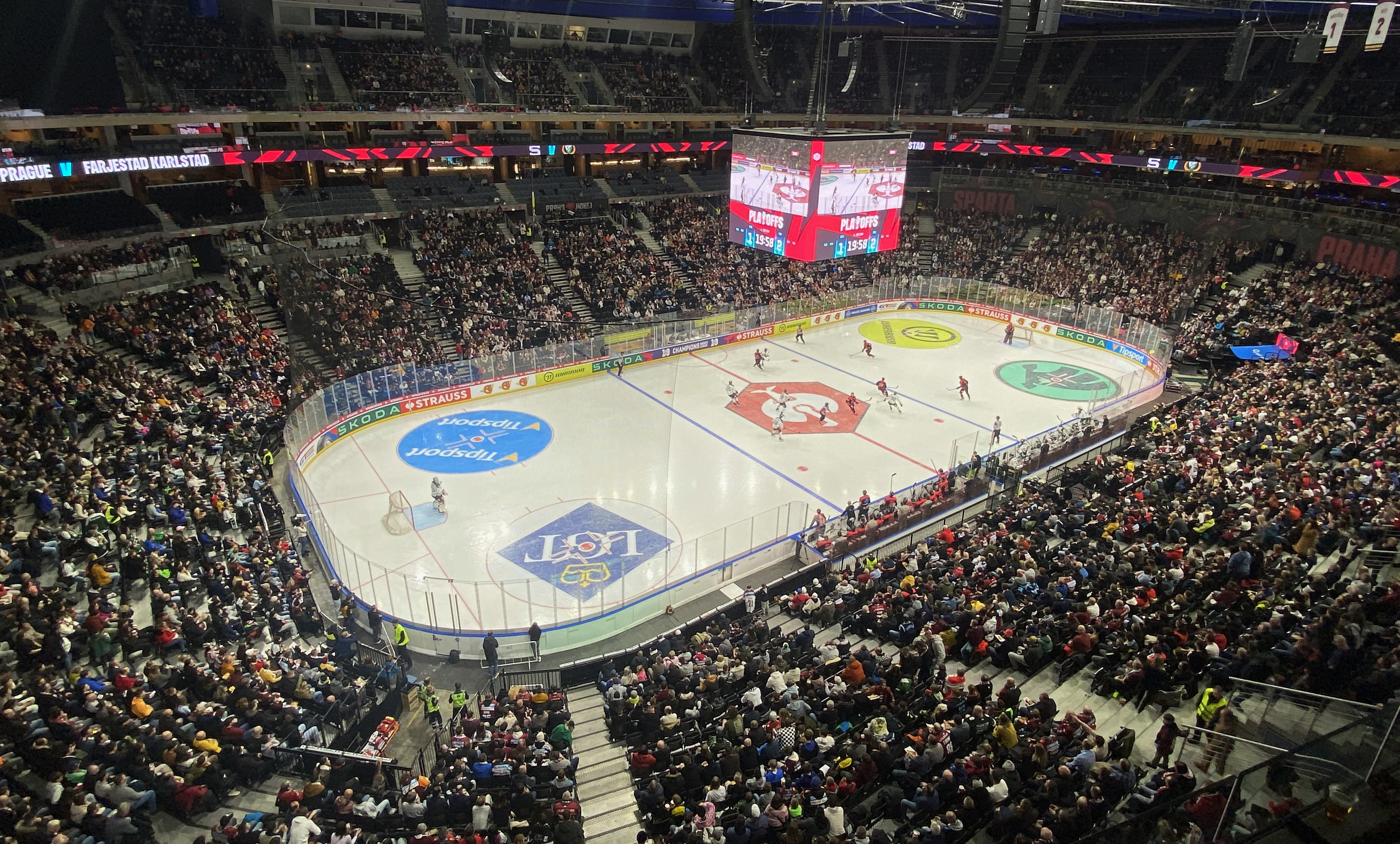
A CHL match in O2 Arena (Sparta Praha vs. Färjestad BK) in 2025

Performance by club
Club	Winners	Runners-up	Win%	Years won
Frölunda HC	5	1	.800	2015–16, 2016–17, 2018–19, 2019–20, 2025–26
Luleå HF	1	2	.500	2014–15
Tappara	1	1	.500	2022–23
JYP	1	0	1.000	2017–18
Rögle BK	1	0	1.000	2021–22
Genève-Servette HC	1	0	1.000	2023–24
ZSC Lions	1	0	1.000	2024–25
Oulun Kärpät	0	1	.000	
Växjö Lakers	0	1	.000	
EHC Red Bull München	0	1	.000	
HC Sparta Praha	0	1	.000	
Mountfield HK	0	1	.000	
Skellefteå AIK	0	1	.000	
Färjestad BK	0	1	.000	

=== By country ===
Performance by country
Country	Winners	Runners-up
Sweden	7	6
Finland	2	2
Switzerland	2	0
Czech Republic	0	2
Germany	0	1

=== Player records ===
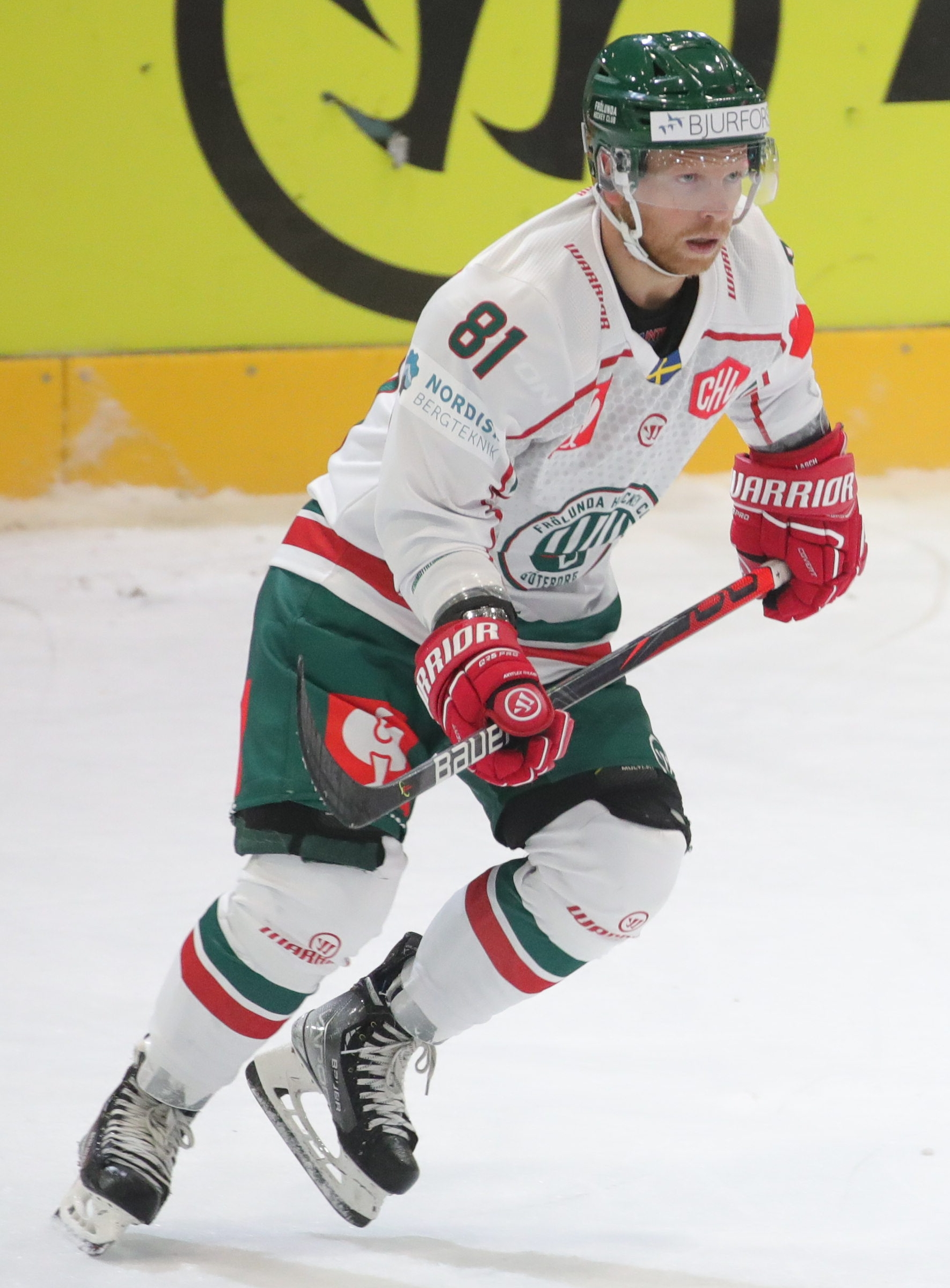
Ryan Lasch is the all-time leader in points, goals and assists.

All records are correct as of the end of the 2025–26 Champions Hockey League season.

Record	Number	Held by
Most games played	94	(Sweden) Nicklas Lasu
Most points	141	(United States) Ryan Lasch
Most goals	44	(United States) Ryan Lasch
Most assists	97	(United States) Ryan Lasch
Most saves	1,633	(Switzerland) Leonardo Genoni
Most wins	34	(Switzerland) Leonardo Genoni

== Awards ==
=== Most Valuable Player ===
The Most Valuable Player Award (MVP) is awarded each season for the player voted most valuable to their team by online fan-vote. Fan's vote over the course of the season, until the top three finalists are chosen. After the three finalists are decided, votes are reset and fans can vote on one of the three finalists.

From the first edition of the competition, the award has always had a sponsored name. For three seasons from 2014–15 to 2016–17, the award was called the NordicBet MVP Trophy. From 2017–18 to 2018–19, it was known as the Betsson MVP Trophy. Since 2019–20, the award has been called the LGT MVP.

Season	Player	Team
2014–15	(Norway) Mathis Olimb	(Sweden) Frölunda HC
2015–16	(United States) Ryan Lasch	(Sweden) Frölunda HC
2016–17	(Sweden) Joel Lundqvist	(Sweden) Frölunda HC
2017–18	(Czech Republic) Šimon Hrubec	(Czech Republic) HC Oceláři Třinec
2018–19	(Canada) Trevor Parkes	(Germany) EHC Red Bull München
2019–20	(United States) Ryan Lasch (2)	(Sweden) Frölunda HC
2020–21	Cancelled due to the COVID-19 pandemic	
2021–22	(Germany) Frederik Tiffels	(Germany) EHC Red Bull München
2022–23	(Finland) Christian Heljanko	(Finland) Tappara
2023–24	(Finland) Sami Vatanen	(Switzerland) Genève-Servette HC
2024–25	(Switzerland) Sven Andrighetto	(Switzerland) ZSC Lions
2025–26	(Sweden) Max Friberg	(Sweden) Frölunda HC

=== Top Scorer Award ===
The player who scores the most points each competition is awarded the Top Scorer Award. This award, like the MVP, has always has a sponsored name. For the first three seasons of the competition, from 2014–15 to 2016–17, it was known as the Cramo Top Scorer. Since 2017–18, the award has been called the LGT Top Scorer.

Season	Player	Team	Points
2014–15	(Norway) Mathis Olimb	(Sweden) Frölunda HC	26
2015–16	(United States) Ryan Lasch	(Sweden) Frölunda HC	16
2016–17	(United States) Casey Wellman	(Sweden) Frölunda HC	14
2017–18	(Sweden) Fredrik Pettersson	(Switzerland) ZSC Lions	16
2018–19	(United States) Ryan Lasch (2)	(Sweden) Frölunda HC	22
2019–20	(United States) Ryan Lasch (3)	(Sweden) Frölunda HC	22
2020–21	Cancelled due to the COVID-19 pandemic		
2021–22	(United States) Ryan Lasch (4)	(Sweden) Frölunda HC	18
2022–23	(United States) Ryan Lasch (5)	(Sweden) Frölunda HC	22
2023–24	(Czech Republic) Dominik Lakatoš	(Czech Republic) HC Vítkovice Ridera	12
2024–25	(Switzerland) Sven Andrighetto	(Switzerland) ZSC Lions	22
2025–26	(Switzerland) Grégory Hofmann	(Switzerland) EV Zug	13

==== Top Scorer jersey ====
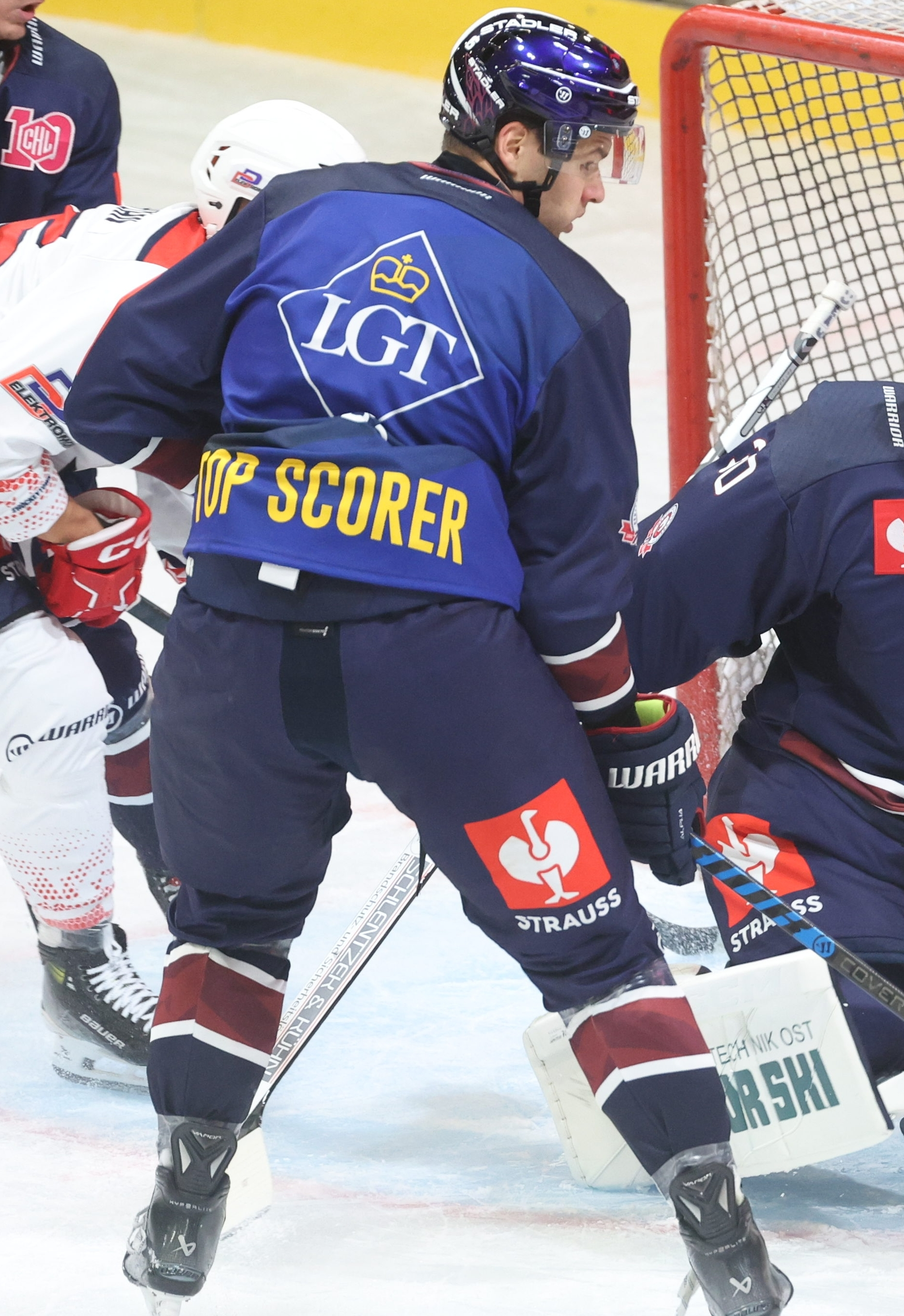
Kai Wissmann wearing the CHL LGT Top Scorer jersey as the top scorer of Eisbären Berlin during a game in 2024

In Champions Hockey League games, like in some other European hockey leagues, the top scorer of each team wears a special jersey. This jersey usually looks the same as the player's standard jersey on the front, but features the logo of the Top Scorer sponsor and text that reads "Top Scorer" on the back, where the player's jersey number would normally be.

== Prize money ==
In the 2014–15 season, 40 teams competed for a grand total of 1.5 million euros. The amount of prize money gradually increased according to plan and for 2018–19 season it reached 2.34 million euros. Originally it was expected that in 2022-23 season, prize money would reach 3.46 million euros. The COVID-19 pandemic changed these plans and prize money have yet not surpassed the 3 million € threshold. In the 2024–25 season total 2.45 million euros was distributed between the 24 participating teams in following composition:

1. Participation in regular season: 65,000 €
2. Reaching the Round of 16: +15,000 €
3. Reaching the Quarter-finals: +20,000 €
4. Reaching the Semi-finals: +20,000 €
5. Losing the Final: +120,000 €
6. Winning the CHL: +240,000 €

The prize money is not expected to grow until 2027–28 season. According to club officials, CHL participation only becomes profitable once a club reaches the semi-finals. This is because of the costs the club pay for each match abroad. Clubs are entitled to earn money from arena tickets, plus they have pre-determined conditions on how they can get their own partners just for the CHL. Czech clubs often take advantage of the opportunity to fly out at least once in the regular season, where they also offer tickets to partners and the public. The trip can also be conceived as a business event, or to thank sponsors for their support, which can even pay for the club's air travel costs. Such additional earnings can be higher than just the prize money.

== Trophy ==
The winner of the Competition receives the European Trophy, named after the tournament European Trophy which was a predecessor to the Champions Hockey League.

== See also ==
- European Trophy, a similar tournament played from 2006 to 2013. European Trophy is the precursor to Champions Hockey League. The names of all four recent European Trophy winners are engraved in the Trophy.
- IIHF Continental Cup
- IIHF European Women's Champions Cup
