= Robert Kousal =

Czech ice hockey player

- Robert Kousal, 2026
- Born: October 7, 1990 (age 35) Pardubice, Czechoslovakia
- Height: 6 ft 1 in (185 cm)
- Weight: 198 lb (90 kg; 14 st 2 lb)
- Position: Forward
- Shoots: Left
- ELH team Former teams: HC Dynamo Pardubice; HC Vityaz; Metallurg Novokuznetsk; HC Davos; Brynäs IF
- National team: Czech Republic
- NHL draft: Undrafted
- Playing career: 2009–present

Robert Kousal (born October 7, 1990) is a Czech professional ice hockey forward who is currently playing for HC Dynamo Pardubice in the Czech Extraliga (ELH).

He played with HC Pardubice in the Czech Extraliga during the 2010–11 Czech Extraliga season.

On 27 June 2019, Kousal left Brynäs IF of the Swedish Hockey League and made a return after five and a half years to hometown club, HC Pardubice, on a one-year contract.
