= Niclas Almari =

Finnish ice hockey player (born 1998)

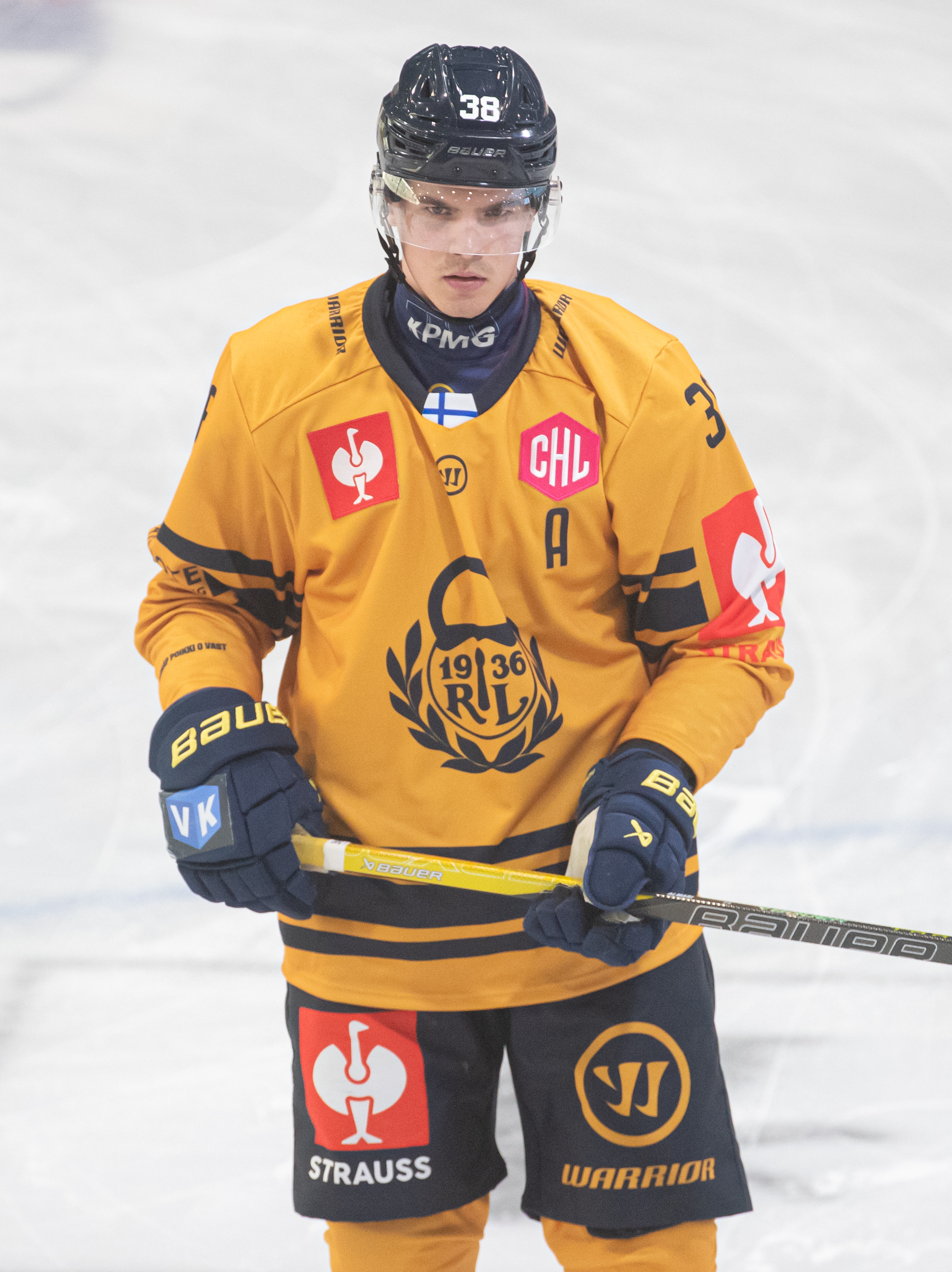
- Almari in 2025
- Born: 11 May 1998 (age 28) Espoo, Finland
- Height: 6 ft 1 in (185 cm)
- Weight: 168 lb (76 kg; 12 st 0 lb)
- Position: Defence
- Shoots: Left
- Liiga team Former teams: Tappara; Lukko; HPK; WBS Penguins; Lahti Pelicans
- NHL draft: 151st overall, 2016; Pittsburgh Penguins
- Playing career: 2016–present

Niclas Almari (born 11 May 1998) is a Finnish professional ice hockey defenceman currently playing with Tappara of the Finnish Liiga. Almari was drafted by the Pittsburgh Penguins in the fifth round, 151st overall, in the 2016 NHL entry draft.

== Playing career ==
Almari played as a youth in his native Finland, within the junior programs at the Jr. A level of the Espoo Blues, Jokerit and HPK. Almari secured his first rookie playing contract with HPK on 29 April 2016.

After his draft selection to the Penguins, Almari split his first professional season in 2016–17 between HPK and Mestis affiliate, LeKi. He made his professional debut on 17 September 2016, against Kärpät and later scored his first Liiga goal on 5 October 2016 against Jukurit. Almari also spent 10 games with HPK's junior club and helped contribute in winning the Jr. A SM-liiga's title. At the conclusion of the season, Almari accepted an amateur try-out with Pittsburgh's AHL affiliate, the Wilkes-Barre/Scranton Penguins on 11 April 2017. In helping his development, Almari trained with Wilkes-Barre and was a part of their extended squad into the post-season.

In returning to HPK for his third season in 2018–19, Almari continued to show an upward trend in his development, appearing in 42 regular season for 5 points. In the playoffs, Almari appeared in all 18 post-season games for HPK, helping claim the Championship on 4 May 2019.

On 10 May 2019, Almari was signed to a three-year, entry-level contract with the Pittsburgh Penguins.

In the final season of his entry-level contract, Almari was assigned to AHL affiliate, Wilkes-Barre before he was later reassigned on loan by Pittsburgh to close out the 2021–22 season with Lukko of the Liiga.

On 1 June 2022, Almari was signed to a two-year contract extension to remain with Lukko, having left the Penguins organization.

== Career statistics ==
=== Regular season and playoffs ===
			Regular season					Playoffs
Season	Team	League	GP	G	A	Pts	PIM	GP	G	A	Pts	PIM
2014–15	Espoo Blues	Jr. A	26	4	4	8	16	—	—	—	—	—
2015–16	Espoo Blues	Jr. A	12	0	0	0	4	—	—	—	—	—
2015–16	Jokerit	Jr. A	27	2	5	7	10	2	0	1	1	4
2016–17	HPK	Jr. A	10	1	4	5	0	10	1	10	11	0
2016–17	HPK	Liiga	24	3	2	5	10	—	—	—	—	—
2016–17	LeKi	Mestis	23	1	6	7	8	—	—	—	—	—
2017–18	HPK	Liiga	41	4	4	8	6	—	—	—	—	—
2017–18	LeKi	Mestis	4	0	1	1	2	—	—	—	—	—
2017–18	Espoo United	Mestis	9	0	3	3	16	—	—	—	—	—
2017–18	HPK	Jr. A	—	—	—	—	—	5	2	1	3	14
2017–18	Wilkes-Barre/Scranton Penguins	AHL	2	0	0	0	2	1	0	1	1	0
2018–19	HPK	Jr. A	2	0	1	1	2	—	—	—	—	—
2018–19	HPK	Liiga	42	1	4	5	6	18	0	0	0	2
2019–20	Wilkes-Barre/Scranton Penguins	AHL	51	1	6	7	18	—	—	—	—	—
2020–21	Lahti Pelicans	Liiga	28	1	6	7	6	5	0	0	0	0
2021–22	Wilkes-Barre/Scranton Penguins	AHL	13	1	1	2	2	—	—	—	—	—
2021–22	Wheeling Nailers	ECHL	6	0	4	4	2	—	—	—	—	—
2021–22	Lukko	Liiga	15	0	2	2	6	7	0	0	0	2
Liiga totals			150	9	18	27	34	30	0	0	0	4

=== International ===
Year	Team	Event	Result	GP	G	A	Pts	PIM
2014	Finland	U17	5th	6	0	1	1	0
Junior totals				6	0	1	1	0

== Awards & honors ==
Award	Year
Liiga
Champion (HPK)	2019
