= Vincent Praplan =

Swiss ice hockey player

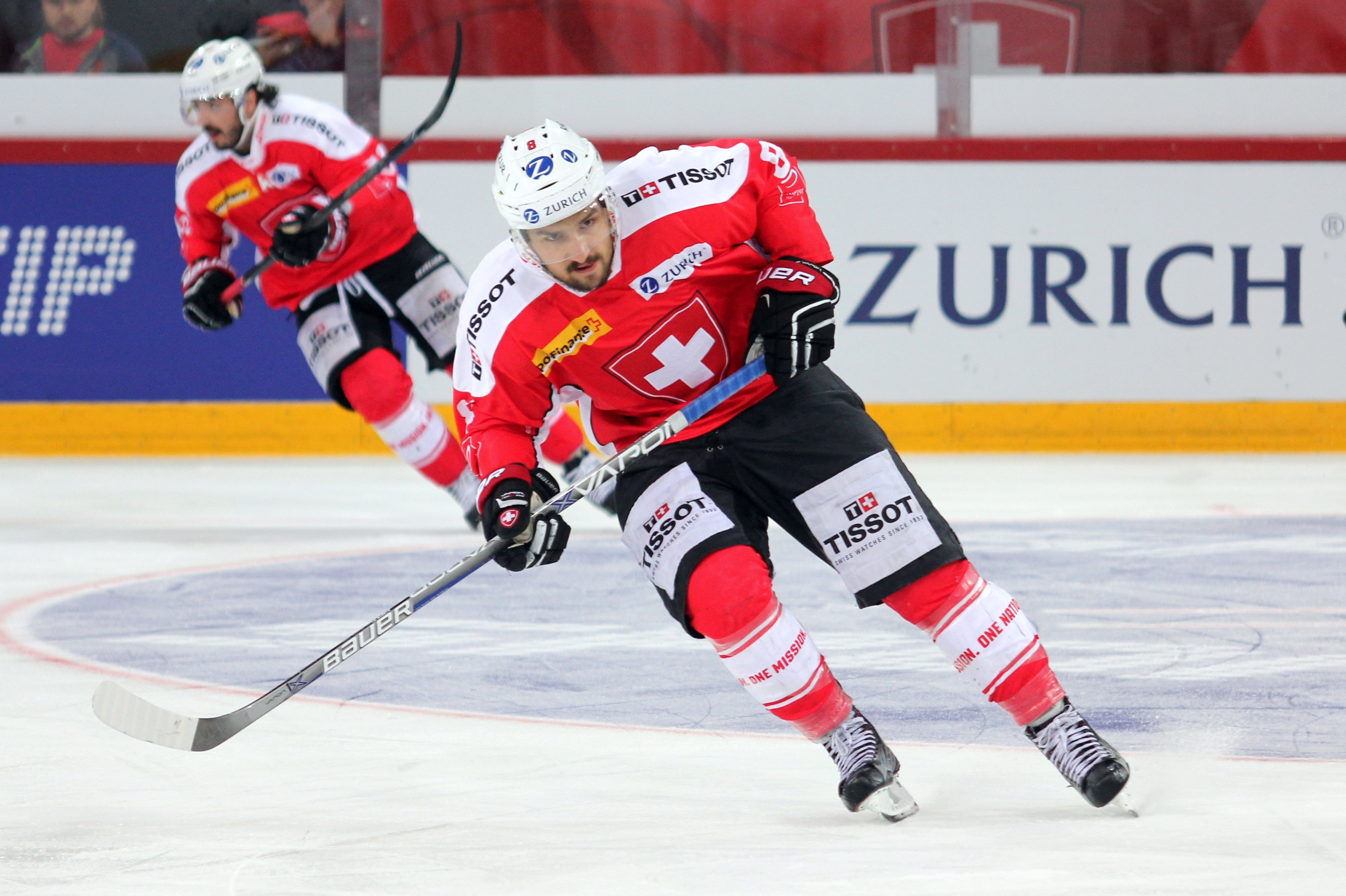
- Born: June 10, 1994 (age 32) Sierre, Switzerland
- Height: 6 ft 0 in (183 cm)
- Weight: 195 lb (88 kg; 13 st 13 lb)
- Position: Forward
- Shoots: Right
- NL team Former teams: Genève-Servette HC; EHC Kloten; San Jose Barracuda; Springfield Thunderbirds; SC Bern
- National team: Switzerland
- NHL draft: Undrafted
- Playing career: 2012–present

Vincent Praplan (born June 10, 1994) is a Swiss professional ice hockey forward who is currently playing for Genève-Servette HC of the National League (NL).

== Playing career ==
Praplan played youth hockey with HC Sierre and EHC Visp before joining the EHC Kloten organization as a 15-year old. He opted to play major junior hockey in North America, skating with the North Bay Battalion in the Ontario Hockey League for the 2013–14 season. Despite scoring 19 goals and 53 points in 61 games, Praplan went undrafted before returning to the NL with EHC Kloten for the following 2014–15 season.

In the midst of his second full season with Kloten in 2015–16, Praplan agreed to a two-year contract extension with Kloten on October 20, 2015.

Praplan participated in the Chicago Blackhawks' development camp in July 2017 and was invited to the San Jose Sharks prospect camp in September 2017.

On August 29, 2017, with one year remaining on his contract, Praplan agreed to a one-year contract extension with Kloten to stay with the team through the 2018–19 season. Both contracts contained NHL-out clauses for both the 2017–18 and 2018–19 seasons. On March 2, 2018, Praplan signed a one-year, entry-level contract with the San Jose Sharks of the National Hockey League (NHL). His contract with Kloten was immediately terminated once the team got relegated to the Swiss League at the end of the season.

After attending the San Jose Sharks 2018 training camp, Praplan was reassigned to make his North American debut with AHL affiliate, the San Jose Barracuda, to begin the 2018–19 season. While limited through injury to 27 games approaching the trade deadline, Praplan contributed with 16 points for the Barracuda, before he was traded by the Sharks to the Florida Panthers for future considerations on February 22, 2019.

On May 17, 2019, as an impending free agent from the Panthers, Praplan returned to his native Switzerland, joining SC Bern of the NL on a four-year deal through the 2022–23 season. Following a disappointing 2021–22 season, both SCB and Praplan decided to terminate his contract with the team.

On March 16, 2022, Praplan left SC Bern following their lowest finish since 1986 and joined Genève-Servette HC on a three-year deal through the 2024–25 season.

== International play ==
Praplan first represented Switzerland at the junior level at the 2011 Ivan Hlinka Memorial Tournament and later at the World Junior Championships in 2014.

Praplan was added to the Swiss national team at the senior level in preparation for the 2017 IIHF World Championship. He would make the final squad and make his full international debut in the round-robin stage. Praplan helped Switzerland past the round-robin stage and contributed with 4 goals and 7 points in 8 games to finish in 6th place.

== Career statistics ==
=== Regular season and playoffs ===
			Regular season					Playoffs
Season	Team	League	GP	G	A	Pts	PIM	GP	G	A	Pts	PIM
2010–11	Kloten Flyers	Elite Jr. A	11	1	1	2	6	4	0	0	0	0
2011–12	Kloten Flyers	Elite Jr. A	36	16	14	30	24	9	6	5	11	10
2012–13	Kloten Flyers	Elite Jr. A	34	33	29	62	83	8	4	8	12	4
2012–13	Kloten Flyers	NLA	5	0	0	0	0	—	—	—	—	—
2013–14	North Bay Battalion	OHL	61	19	34	53	16	21	2	2	4	6
2014–15	Kloten Flyers	NLA	46	4	4	8	8	—	—	—	—	—
2015–16	Kloten Flyers	NLA	50	18	15	33	4	4	1	1	2	0
2016–17	EHC Kloten	NLA	50	15	27	42	18	—	—	—	—	—
2017–18	EHC Kloten	NL	47	15	24	39	31	—	—	—	—	—
2018–19	San Jose Barracuda	AHL	27	4	12	16	14	—	—	—	—	—
2018–19	Springfield Thunderbirds	AHL	14	2	5	7	4	—	—	—	—	—
2019–20	SC Bern	NL	50	10	18	28	18	—	—	—	—	—
2020–21	SC Bern	NL	45	13	14	27	49	9	2	5	7	10
2021–22	SC Bern	NL	38	6	14	20	22	—	—	—	—	—
2022–23	Genève-Servette HC	NL	52	15	21	36	20	15	1	6	7	4
2023–24	Genève-Servette HC	NL	52	10	13	23	55	2	0	0	0	0
NL totals			435	106	150	256	225	30	4	12	16	14

=== International ===
Year	Team	Event	Result	GP	G	A	Pts	PIM
2011	Switzerland	IH18	7th	4	1	0	1	0
2014	Switzerland	WJC	7th	5	0	1	1	6
2017	Switzerland	WC	6th	8	4	3	7	2
2018	Switzerland	OG	10th	4	0	0	0	0
2019	Switzerland	WC	8th	7	1	5	6	4
2021	Switzerland	WC	6th	4	0	1	1	0
Junior totals				9	1	1	2	6
Senior totals				23	5	9	14	6
