= Tomáš Vondráček =

Czech ice hockey player

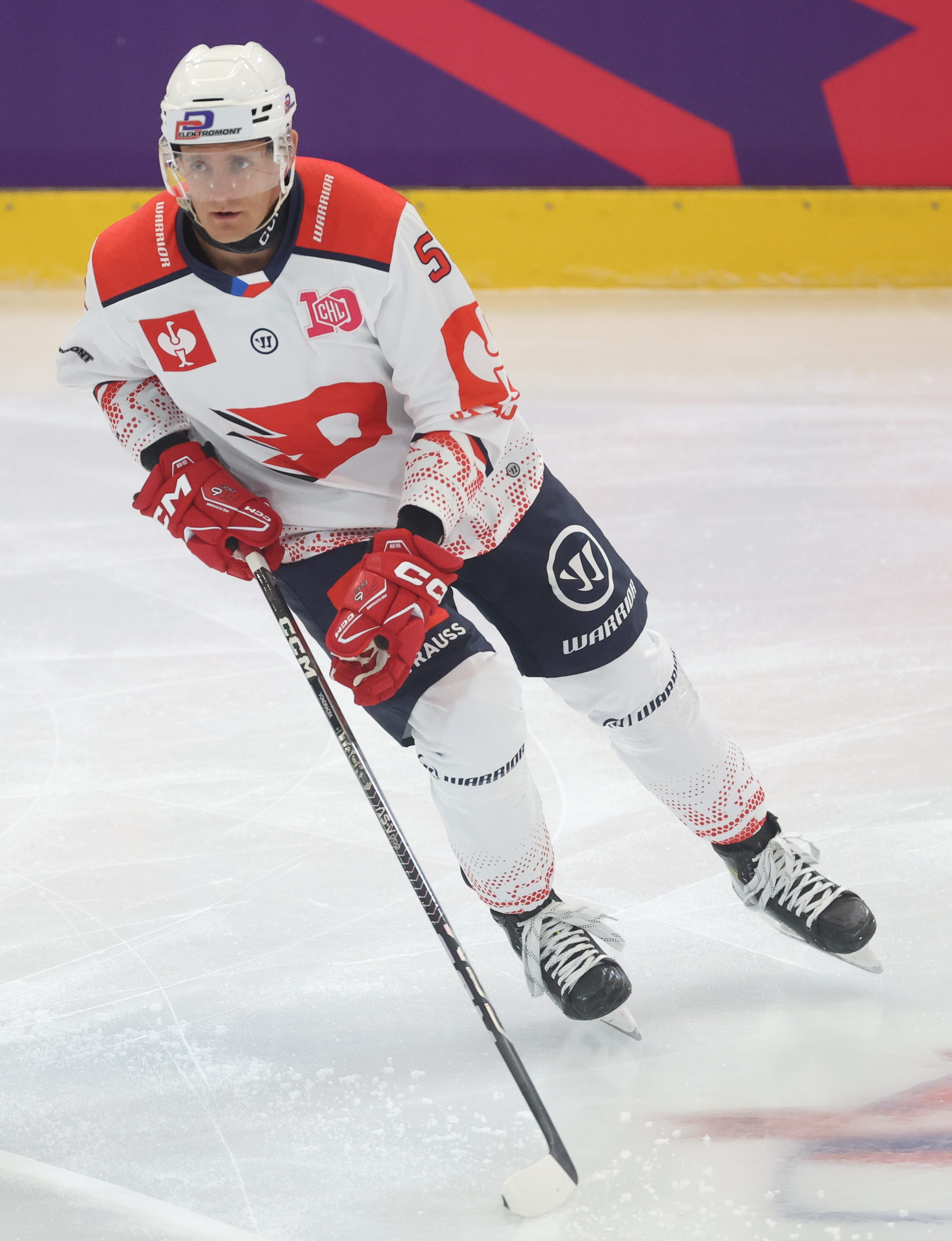
- Tomáš Vondráček, 2024
- Born: February 16, 1991 (age 35) Třebíč, Czechoslovakia
- Height: 6 ft 3 in (191 cm)
- Weight: 209 lb (95 kg; 14 st 13 lb)
- Position: Forward
- Shoots: Left
- ELH team Former teams: HC Dynamo Pardubice; HC Kometa Brno; HC Plzeň; HC Karlovy Vary; HC Vítkovice
- Playing career: 2010–present

Tomáš Vondráček (born February 16, 1991) is a Czech professional ice hockey player. He currently plays with HC Dynamo Pardubice of the Czech Extraliga (ELH).

Vondráček made his Czech Extraliga debut playing with HC Kometa Brno debut during the 2012–13 Czech Extraliga season.
