= Lukáš Klimeš =

Czech ice hockey player

- Born: 14 July 1994 (age 30); Brno, Czech Republic
- Height: 6 ft 1 in (185 cm)
- Weight: 198 lb (90 kg; 14 st 2 lb)
- Position: Goaltender
- Catches: Left
- ELH team Former teams: HC Vítkovice; HC Kometa Brno
- Playing career: 2013–present

Lukáš Klimeš (born 14 July 1994) is a Czech professional ice hockey goalie. He is currently playing for HC Vítkovice Ridera of the Czech Extraliga (ELH).

Klimeš made his Czech Extraliga debut playing with HC Kometa Brno during the 2014-15 Czech Extraliga season.

== Career statistics ==
=== Regular season and playoffs ===
			Regular season										Playoffs
Season	Team	League	GP	W	L	T	OTL	MIN	GA	SO	GAA	SV%	GP	W	L	MIN	GA	SO	GAA	SV%
