= Sami Vatanen =

Finnish ice hockey player (born 1991)

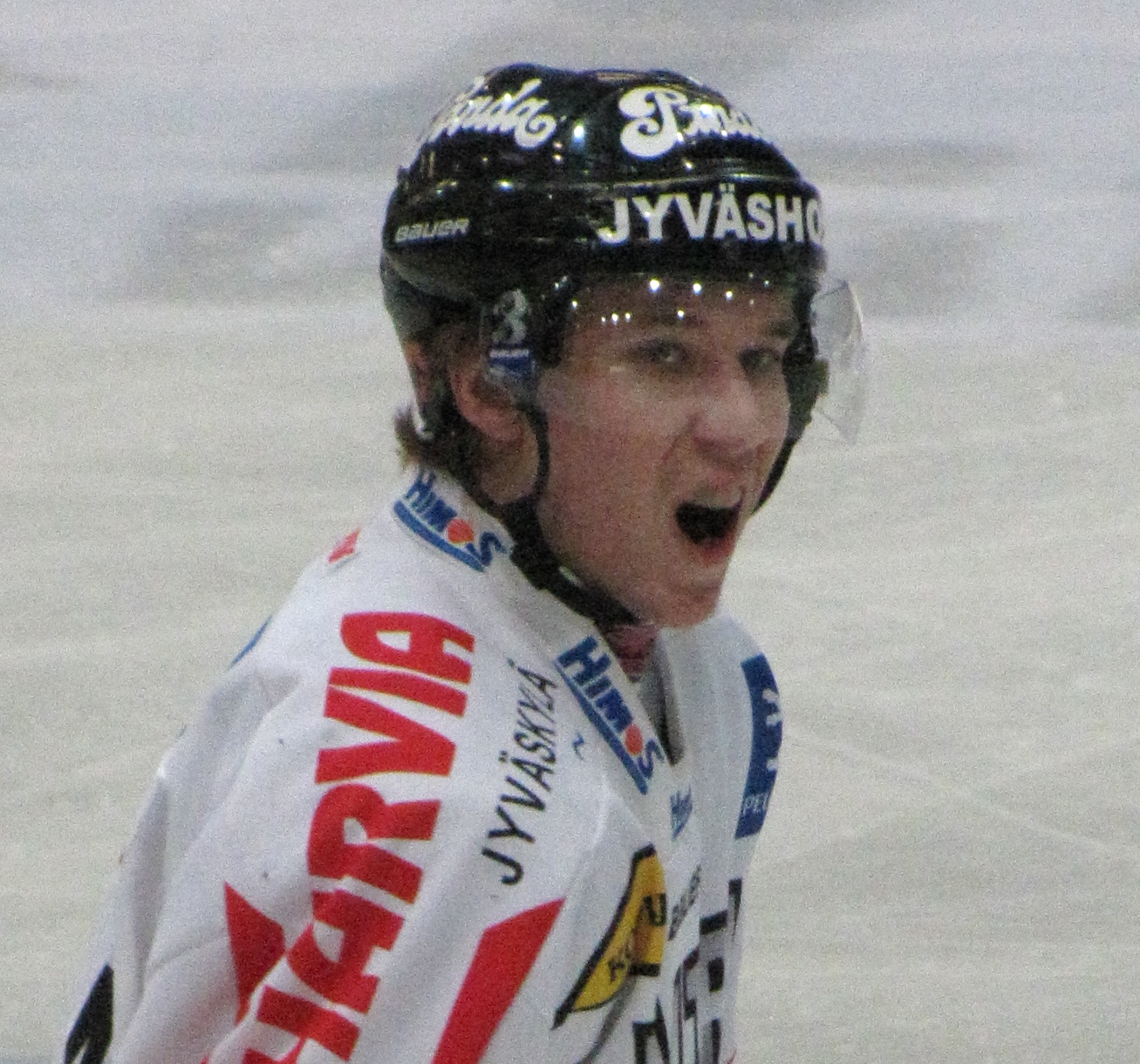
- Vatanen with JYP in 2011
- Born: 3 June 1991 (age 35) Jyväskylä, Finland
- Height: 5 ft 10 in (178 cm)
- Weight: 185 lb (84 kg; 13 st 3 lb)
- Position: Defence
- Shoots: Right
- Liiga team Former teams: JYP; Anaheim Ducks; New Jersey Devils; Carolina Hurricanes; Dallas Stars; Genève-Servette HC
- National team: Finland
- NHL draft: 106th overall, 2009; Anaheim Ducks
- Playing career: 2009–present

Sami Vatanen (born 3 June 1991) is a Finnish professional ice hockey defenceman for JYP of the Finnish Liiga. He was drafted in the fourth round, 106th overall, by the Anaheim Ducks at the 2009 NHL entry draft, and played in National Hockey League for the Ducks, New Jersey Devils, Carolina Hurricanes and Dallas Stars. Vatanen started his career in hometown Jyväskylä playing for JYP with whom he won the 2011–12 SM-liiga championship. In 2023, Vatanen won the Swiss National League (NL) championship with Genève-Servette HC, and the Champions Hockey League (CHL) in the 2023–24 season.

Internationally, Vatanen has represented Finland and was part of the gold medal-winning teams at the 2022 Winter Olympics, and the 2022 World Championships.

== Playing career ==
Vatanen was drafted by the Anaheim Ducks in the fourth round of the 2009 NHL entry draft. The following season, he earned a spot on defending Finnish champions JYP's roster. He broke a record for most points by a rookie defenceman in the Finnish SM-liiga regular season and playoffs.

Vatanen made his NHL debut with Anaheim in the lockout-shortened 2012–13 season, on 1 February 2013. Vatanen was also selected to the AHL First All-Star Team and the AHL All-Rookie Team, despite playing in just 62 games of the 76-game season.

On 22 July 2014, Vatanen signed a new two-year, $2.525 million contract with Anaheim. He recorded 12 goals and 25 assists during the 2014–15 season, his first full NHL season.

At the completion of the 2015–16 season, Vatanen amassed a new career high with 38 points in 71 games. As a restricted free agent, on 18 June 2016, he signed a new four-year contract with Anaheim.

On 30 November 2017, during the 2017–18 season, Vatanen was traded (along with a conditional third-round pick in 2019 or 2020) to the New Jersey Devils in exchange for Joseph Blandisi, Adam Henrique and a third-round pick in 2018. He finished the season with 32 points in 72 games.

On 24 February 2020, Vatanen was traded to the Carolina Hurricanes in exchange for Janne Kuokkanen, Fredrik Claesson and a conditional 2020 fourth-round pick. He appeared in seven postseason games for the club, recording three assists.

On 7 January 2021, Vatanen returned to the Devils on a one-year $2 million contract. On 12 April, Vatanen was claimed off waivers by the Dallas Stars.

On 26 September 2021, Vatanen signed a one-year contract with Genève-Servette HC of the Swiss National League (NL).

== International play ==
Medal record

Representing Finland

Ice hockey

Winter Olympics
Gold medal – first place	2022 Beijing	
Bronze medal – third place	2014 Sochi	

World Championships
Gold medal – first place	2022 Finland	

IIHF World U18 Championships
Bronze medal – third place	2009 United States	

In 2010, Vatanen represented Finland internationally at the junior level (2010 World Junior Championships held in Saskatchewan) and at the senior level (2010 World Championships held in Germany). At the end of the 2009–10 season, Vatanen also became the highest-drafted Finnish player in Kontinental Hockey League (KHL) history when he was selected second overall in the 2010 KHL Junior Draft by Metallurg Novokuznetsk.

At the 2014 Winter Olympics in Sochi, Vatanen won a bronze medal when Finland defeated the United States 5–0.

Vatanen represented Finland at the 2016 World Cup of Hockey held in Toronto in September 2016.

Vatanen represented Finland at the 2022 Winter Olympics, where Finland beat Russia to win Olympic Gold.

== Career statistics ==
=== Regular season and playoffs ===
			Regular season					Playoffs
Season	Team	League	GP	G	A	Pts	PIM	GP	G	A	Pts	PIM
2007–08	JYP	FIN U18 Q	9	2	4	6	10	—	—	—	—	—
2007–08	JYP	FIN U18	26	7	25	32	20	1	0	0	0	0
2007–08	JYP	Jr. A	—	—	—	—	—	2	0	0	0	0
2008–09	JYP	FIN U18 Q	3	1	1	2	14	—	—	—	—	—
2008–09	JYP	FIN.2 U18	2	2	3	5	0	1	1	1	2	14
2008–09	JYP	Jr. A	20	3	7	10	22	—	—	—	—	—
2008–09	D Team	Mestis	5	1	1	2	8	—	—	—	—	—
2008–09	Suomi U20	Mestis	2	0	0	0	2	—	—	—	—	—
2009–10	JYP	SM-l	55	7	23	30	44	14	3	4	7	6
2009–10	Suomi U20	Mestis	1	0	0	0	2	—	—	—	—	—
2010–11	JYP	SM-l	52	11	20	31	30	3	1	1	2	0
2011–12	JYP	SM-l	49	14	28	42	40	4	2	0	2	4
2012–13	Norfolk Admirals	AHL	62	9	36	45	44	—	—	—	—	—
2012–13	Anaheim Ducks	NHL	8	2	0	2	0	—	—	—	—	—
2013–14	Anaheim Ducks	NHL	48	6	15	21	22	5	0	1	1	0
2013–14	Norfolk Admirals	AHL	8	2	5	7	4	5	0	3	3	4
2014–15	Anaheim Ducks	NHL	67	12	25	37	36	16	3	8	11	8
2015–16	Anaheim Ducks	NHL	71	9	29	38	20	7	1	3	4	6
2016–17	Anaheim Ducks	NHL	71	3	21	24	30	12	1	5	6	4
2017–18	Anaheim Ducks	NHL	15	1	3	4	8	—	—	—	—	—
2017–18	New Jersey Devils	NHL	57	3	25	28	32	4	1	0	1	0
2018–19	New Jersey Devils	NHL	50	4	13	17	22	—	—	—	—	—
2019–20	New Jersey Devils	NHL	47	5	18	23	22	—	—	—	—	—
2019–20	Carolina Hurricanes	NHL	—	—	—	—	—	7	0	3	3	6
2020–21	New Jersey Devils	NHL	30	2	4	6	18	—	—	—	—	—
2020–21	Dallas Stars	NHL	9	0	0	0	2	—	—	—	—	—
2021–22	Genève–Servette HC	NL	38	9	30	39	12	2	1	0	1	0
2022–23	Genève–Servette HC	NL	13	1	13	14	6	17	7	6	13	0
2023–24	Genève–Servette HC	NL	48	9	29	38	10	2	0	0	0	0
2024–25	Genève–Servette HC	NL	42	3	16	19	4	—	—	—	—	—
2025–26	JYP	Liiga	57	8	36	44	34	—	—	—	—	—
Liiga totals			213	40	107	147	148	21	6	5	11	10
NHL totals			473	47	153	200	212	51	6	20	26	24
NL totals			141	22	88	110	32	21	8	6	14	2

=== International ===
Year	Team	Event	Result	GP	G	A	Pts	PIM
2008	Finland	U17	6th	5	2	3	5	8
2008	Finland	WJC18	6th	6	0	3	3	4
2009	Finland	WJC18	3rd place, bronze medalist(s)	6	1	1	2	2
2010	Finland	WJC	5th	6	2	3	5	0
2010	Finland	WC	6th	7	0	0	0	6
2011	Finland	WJC	6th	6	0	4	4	4
2014	Finland	OG	3rd place, bronze medalist(s)	6	0	5	5	0
2016	Finland	WCH	8th	3	0	0	0	2
2022	Finland	OG	1st place, gold medalist(s)	6	0	3	3	4
2022	Finland	WC	1st place, gold medalist(s)	8	2	4	6	2
Junior totals				29	5	14	19	18
Senior totals				30	2	12	14	14

== Awards and honours ==
Award	Year	Ref
Liiga
Pekka Rautakallio trophy Awarded to the best defenceman in SM-liiga	2010–11, 2011–12	
Matti Keinonen trophy Awarded to the player with the best +/- rating	2010–11	
SM-Liiga championship	2011–12	
Swiss National League Champion	2022–23	
