= Elias Salomonsson =

Swedish ice hockey player (born 2004)

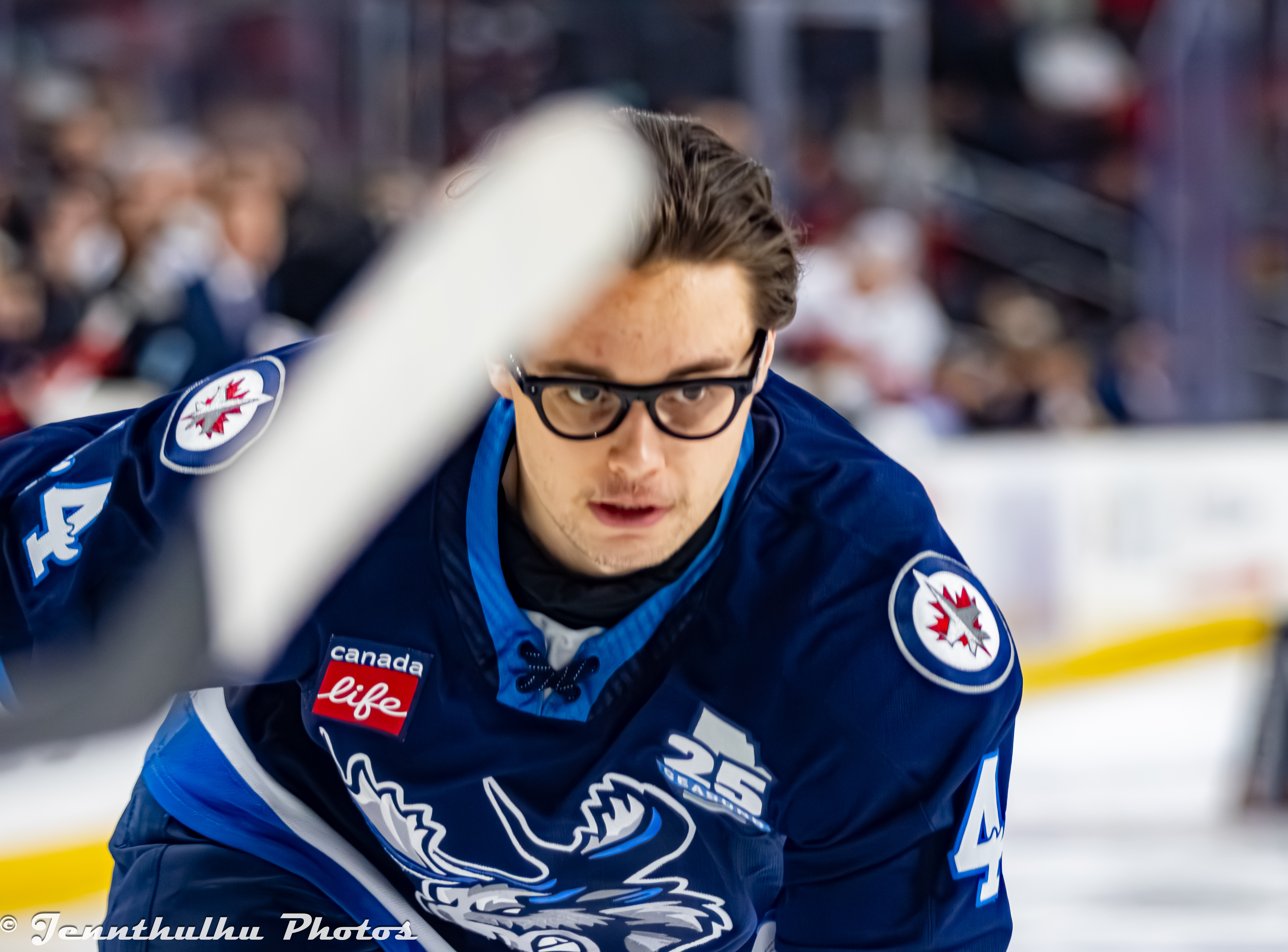
- Salomonsson with the Manitoba Moose in 2025
- Born: 31 August 2004 (age 22) Skellefteå, Sweden
- Height: 6 ft 1 in (185 cm)
- Weight: 172 lb (78 kg; 12 st 4 lb)
- Position: Defence
- Shoots: Right
- NHL team Former teams: Winnipeg Jets; Skellefteå AIK
- NHL draft: 55th overall, 2022; Winnipeg Jets
- Playing career: 2021–present

Elias Salomonsson (born 31 August 2004) is a Swedish professional ice hockey defenceman for the Winnipeg Jets of the National Hockey League (NHL). Salomonsson was selected by the Jets in the second round, 55th pick overall, of the 2022 NHL entry draft.

== Playing career ==
Salomonsson played as a youth and made his professional debut within Skellefteå AIK of the Swedish Hockey League (SHL).

Following his selection at the 2022 NHL entry draft, Salomonsson was signed by the Winnipeg Jets to a three-year, entry-level contract on 16 July 2022.

Salmonsson was called up to the Jets main roster November 25, 2025 to make his NHL debut the following day against the Washington Capitals. Later, on February 27th, 2026- Salomonsson scored his first NHL goal in a 5-4 Jets loss to the Anaheim Ducks.

== International play ==
Medal record

Representing Sweden

Ice hockey

World Junior Championships
Silver medal – second place	2024 Sweden	

World U18 Championships
Gold medal – first place	2022 Germany	
Bronze medal – third place	2021 United States	

Salomonsson represented Sweden at the 2024 World Junior Ice Hockey Championships and won a silver medal.

== Career statistics ==
=== Regular season and playoffs ===
			Regular season					Playoffs
Season	Team	League	GP	G	A	Pts	PIM	GP	G	A	Pts	PIM
2020–21	Skellefteå AIK	J20	14	4	11	15	0	—	—	—	—	—
2020–21	Skellefteå AIK	SHL	3	0	0	0	0	—	—	—	—	—
2021–22	Skellefteå AIK	J20	35	11	11	22	10	2	0	1	1	0
2021–22	Skellefteå AIK	SHL	10	0	0	0	2	—	—	—	—	—
2022–23	Skellefteå AIK	J20	4	3	2	5	10	—	—	—	—	—
2022–23	Skellefteå AIK	SHL	25	3	2	5	10	17	1	1	2	6
2023–24	Skellefteå AIK	SHL	31	2	9	11	58	16	1	5	6	10
2024–25	Manitoba Moose	AHL	53	5	22	27	24	—	—	—	—	—
2025–26	Manitoba Moose	AHL	29	1	8	9	10	—	—	—	—	—
2025–26	Winnipeg Jets	NHL	32	1	4	5	12	—	—	—	—	—
SHL totals			69	5	11	16	70	33	2	6	8	16
NHL totals			32	1	4	5	12	—	—	—	—	—

=== International ===
Year	Team	Event	Result	GP	G	A	Pts	PIM
2021	Sweden	U18	3rd place, bronze medalist(s)	7	0	0	0	4
2021	Sweden	HG18	3rd place, bronze medalist(s)	5	0	1	1	2
2022	Sweden	U18	1st place, gold medalist(s)	5	0	1	1	29
2024	Sweden	WJC	2nd place, silver medalist(s)	6	0	1	1	29
Junior totals				23	0	3	3	64

== Awards and honours ==
Award	Year
SHL
Le Mat Trophy (Skellefteå AIK)	2024
