= Tarmo Reunanen =

Finnish ice hockey player

- Born: 1 March 1998 (age 28) Äänekoski, Finland
- Height: 6 ft 0 in (183 cm)
- Weight: 179 lb (81 kg; 12 st 11 lb)
- Position: Defenceman
- Shoots: Left
- Liiga team Former teams: TPS; Lukko; HPK; New York Rangers
- NHL draft: 98th overall, 2016; New York Rangers
- Playing career: 2016–present

Tarmo Reunanen (born 1 March 1998) is a Finnish professional ice hockey defenceman for TPS of the Liiga. He was selected by the New York Rangers in the fourth round, 98th overall, of the 2016 NHL entry draft.

== Playing career ==
Reunanen made his Liiga debut with TPS in the 2016–17 season. During the 2017–18 season, having produced 3 assists in 25 games with TPS, Reunanen was traded to fellow Finnish club Lukko on 18 January 2018. On 6 June 2019, Reunanen signed an entry-level contract with the New York Rangers. After the training camp for the 2019–20 season, the Rangers loaned Reunanen to Lukko. In October 2020, he was loaned to TUTO Hockey of the Finnish Mestis, and was then loaned to HPK of the Finnish Liiga in November 2020.

Reunanen started the 2020–21 season with the Hartford Wolf Pack, where he had two goals and three assists in eight games before being called up to the Rangers on 15 March 2021. He recorded an assist in his NHL debut against the Philadelphia Flyers on that day.

In the following 2021–22 season, Reunanen remained assigned by the Rangers to the Hartford Wolf Pack of the AHL. After matching his previous season totals with 17 points through 40 regular season games with the Wolf Pack, Reunanen was traded by the Rangers to the Carolina Hurricanes in exchange for Maxim Letunov on 28 March 2022. He was assigned to AHL affiliate, the Chicago Wolves for the remainder of the season.

On 29 June 2022, Reunanen opted to return to his homeland as an impending restricted free agent, signing a two-year contract with his former club, Lukko of the Liiga.

== Career statistics ==
=== Regular season and playoffs ===
			Regular season					Playoffs
Season	Team	League	GP	G	A	Pts	PIM	GP	G	A	Pts	PIM
2014–15	TPS	Jr. A	42	8	22	30	24	12	1	1	2	0
2015–16	TPS	Jr. A	11	2	4	6	14	2	0	0	0	2
2016–17	TPS	Jr. A	4	1	2	3	6	3	1	1	2	2
2016–17	TPS	Liiga	2	0	0	0	0	—	—	—	—	—
2016–17	TUTO Hockey	Mestis	42	0	9	9	54	—	—	—	—	—
2017–18	TPS	Jr. A	10	2	7	9	2	—	—	—	—	—
2017–18	TPS	Liiga	25	0	3	3	0	—	—	—	—	—
2017–18	SaPKo	Mestis	2	0	2	2	2	—	—	—	—	—
2017–18	Lukko	Liiga	8	0	1	1	0	—	—	—	—	—
2018–19	Lukko	Liiga	58	6	19	25	40	6	1	4	5	2
2018–19	Lukko	Jr. A	1	0	1	1	0	—	—	—	—	—
2019–20	Lukko	Liiga	51	5	14	19	32	—	—	—	—	—
2020–21	TuTo Hockey	Mestis	7	2	7	9	12	—	—	—	—	—
2020–21	HPK	Liiga	7	1	1	2	4	—	—	—	—	—
2020–21	Hartford Wolf Pack	AHL	21	4	13	17	4	—	—	—	—	—
2020–21	New York Rangers	NHL	4	0	1	1	0	—	—	—	—	—
2021–22	Hartford Wolf Pack	AHL	40	2	15	17	10	—	—	—	—	—
2021–22	Chicago Wolves	AHL	8	1	2	3	4	—	—	—	—	—
2022–23	Lukko	Liiga	59	10	12	22	55	6	1	3	4	0
Liiga totals			210	22	50	72	131	12	2	7	9	2
NHL totals			4	0	1	1	0	—	—	—	—	—

=== International ===
Year	Team	Event	Result	GP	G	A	Pts	PIM
2014	Finland	U17	4th	6	1	1	2	2
2015	Finland	IH18	4th	5	0	1	1	6
Junior totals				11	1	2	3	8
