= Marcus Westfält =

Swedish professional ice hockey forward (born 2000)

- Born: 12 March 2000 (age 26) Stockholm, Sweden
- Height: 6 ft 3 in (191 cm)
- Weight: 203 lb (92 kg; 14 st 7 lb)
- Position: Center
- Shoots: Left
- SHL team Former teams: Timrå IK; Brynäs IF; Färjestad BK
- NHL draft: 205th overall, 2018; Philadelphia Flyers
- Playing career: 2016–present

Marcus Westfält (born 12 March 2000) is a Swedish professional ice hockey forward who currently plays under contract to Timrå IK of the Swedish Hockey League (SHL).

== Playing career ==
Westfält first played as a youth with Vallentuna BK in the Hockeyettan before continuing his junior career with Brynäs IF. On 1 December 2017, he was signed to a four-year contract extension to continue his development with Brynäs IF.

He made his Swedish Hockey League debut in the 2017–18 season, appearing in a depth role over 31 games for 4 points. Westfält was drafted by the Philadelphia Flyers in the seventh round, 205th overall, in the 2018 NHL entry draft.

In the following 2018–19 season, Westfält posted an assist in 19 appearances in the SHL, before he was loaned to Karlskrona HK of the HockeyAllsvenskan for the remainder of the season on 3 January 2019.

Westfält spent the entirety of the 2019–20 season, continuing in the Allsvenskan on loan from Brynäs IF with Västerviks IK. He registered three goals and 8 points in 52 games, opting to sign a new one-year contract with Västerviks IK by leaving Brynäs IF on 3 June 2020.

Following three seasons with Västerviks IK, Westfält made a return to the SHL for the 2022–23 season, signing a three-year contract with Färjestad BK on 2 June 2022.

Having concluded his contract with Färjestad BK, Westfält left as a free agent to sign a further three year contract to continue in the SHL with Timrå IK on 14 April 2025.

== Career statistics ==
=== Regular season and playoffs ===
			Regular season					Playoffs
Season	Team	League	GP	G	A	Pts	PIM	GP	G	A	Pts	PIM
2015–16	Vallentuna BK	Div.1	1	0	0	0	0	—	—	—	—	—
2016–17	Brynäs IF	J20	15	3	2	5	2	2	0	0	0	2
2017–18	Brynäs IF	J20	26	12	15	27	38	—	—	—	—	—
2017–18	Brynäs IF	SHL	31	1	3	4	6	8	0	0	0	0
2018–19	Brynäs IF	J20	12	4	6	10	18	—	—	—	—	—
2018–19	Brynäs IF	SHL	19	0	1	1	2	—	—	—	—	—
2018–19	Karlskrona HK	Allsv	19	0	2	2	10	5	0	0	0	0
2018–19	Karlskrona HK	J20	—	—	—	—	—	4	3	0	3	0
2019–20	Västerviks IK	Allsv	52	3	5	8	20	1	0	0	0	0
2020–21	Västerviks IK	Allsv	51	6	7	13	30	10	0	1	1	2
2021–22	Västerviks IK	Allsv	51	12	10	22	26	7	1	3	4	0
2022–23	Färjestad BK	SHL	51	9	8	17	16	7	0	1	1	2
2023–24	Färjestad BK	SHL	52	6	13	19	20	4	0	0	0	0
2024–25	Färjestad BK	SHL	51	5	6	11	10	6	0	0	0	4
2025–26	Timrå IK	SHL	49	4	2	6	14	—	—	—	—	—
SHL totals			253	25	33	58	68	25	0	1	1	6

=== International ===
Year	Team	Event	Result	GP	G	A	Pts	PIM
2016	Sweden	U17	1st place, gold medalist(s)	6	2	1	3	0
2017	Sweden	IH18	3rd place, bronze medalist(s)	5	2	0	2	2
2018	Sweden	U18	3rd place, bronze medalist(s)	7	2	0	2	2
Junior totals				18	6	1	7	4
