= Sebastian Repo =

Finnish ice hockey player

- Born: 23 June 1996 (age 30) Lahti, Finland
- Height: 6 ft 2 in (188 cm)
- Weight: 198 lb (90 kg; 14 st 2 lb)
- Position: Forward
- Shoots: Right
- Liiga team Former teams: HIFK; Lukko; Lahti Pelicans; Tappara; Springfield Thunderbirds
- NHL draft: 184th overall, 2017; Florida Panthers
- Playing career: 2014–present

Sebastian Repo (born 23 June 1996) is a Finnish professional ice hockey forward. He is currently playing with HIFK in the Finnish Liiga. He was drafted by the Panthers, 184th overall, in the 2017 NHL entry draft.

== Playing career ==
Repo first played as a youth at the Under 16 level as a 14-year old in his native Finland, with hometown club, Lahti Pelicans. In showing elite development within the Pelicans program he eventually made his Liiga debut playing with Pelicans during the 2014–15 season. He ended the season, playing the latter half in the North American junior system with the Sioux City Musketeers in the United States Hockey League, however was passed over in the 2015 NHL entry draft.

In the beginning of his third season with the Pelicans in 2016–17, Repo was transferred to contending Liiga club, Tappara on 24 October 2016. Playing alongside future Panthers prospect Henrik Haapala, Repo increased his offensive output to post a season best of 24 assists and 35 points in 54 games. In the post-season, he co-led the league with 6 goals in helping Tappara claim the Liiga Championship.

As an overage prospect, Repo's impressive year was capped when he was selected by the Florida Panthers in the sixth round, 184th overall, in the 2017 NHL Entry Draft. On 3 July 2017, he was promptly signed to a three-year, entry-level contract with the Panthers. After attending the Panthers 2017 training camp and partaking in the pre-season, Repo was reassigned to continue his development on loan with Tappara for the 2017–18 season on 29 September 2017.

During his second year and final season under contract with the Panthers in North America, Repo continued his tenure in the American Hockey League with affiliate, the Springfield Thunderbirds. After contributing with 6 points in 17 games in the 2019–20 season, Repo was mutually released from his contract with the Panthers on 19 December 2019.

Opting to return to his native Finland, Repo secured a contract for the remainder of the season with his third Liiga club, Lukko, on 20 December 2019.

== International play ==
Medal record

Representing Finland

Ice hockey

World Junior Championships
Gold medal – first place	2016 Finland	

Repo participated in multiple junior selection squad's for Finland at the International level. Repo was eventually selected to participate in his first tournament at the 2016 World Junior Championships. In playing for the host country, Repo recorded 1 assist in 7 games, featuring in the final victory against Russia to help Finland claim the gold medal.

== Career statistics ==
=== Regular season and playoffs ===
			Regular season					Playoffs
Season	Team	League	GP	G	A	Pts	PIM	GP	G	A	Pts	PIM
2013–14	Pelicans	Jr. A	45	14	22	36	32	11	0	3	3	10
2014–15	Pelicans	Jr. A	19	7	8	15	67	—	—	—	—	—
2014–15	Pelicans	Liiga	10	0	0	0	2	—	—	—	—	—
2014–15	Peliitat	Mestis	4	0	0	0	2	—	—	—	—	—
2014–15	Sioux City Musketeers	USHL	25	6	9	15	20	5	0	0	0	2
2015–16	Pelicans	Jr. A	2	3	3	6	0	—	—	—	—	—
2015–16	Pelicans	Liiga	50	15	13	28	14	6	0	2	2	4
2015–16	Peliitat	Mestis	1	1	2	3	0	—	—	—	—	—
2016–17	Pelicans	Liiga	8	0	3	3	2	—	—	—	—	—
2016–17	Peliitat	Mestis	4	2	2	4	6	—	—	—	—	—
2016–17	Tappara	Liiga	46	11	21	32	78	18	6	1	7	16
2017–18	Tappara	Liiga	50	14	12	26	68	15	4	3	7	41
2018–19	Springfield Thunderbirds	AHL	64	12	8	20	45	—	—	—	—	—
2019–20	Springfield Thunderbirds	AHL	17	3	3	6	12	—	—	—	—	—
2019–20	Lukko	Liiga	28	10	13	23	31	—	—	—	—	—
2020–21	Lukko	Liiga	58	13	20	33	64	10	2	4	6	2
2021–22	Lukko	Liiga	40	21	9	30	12	7	1	1	2	0
Liiga totals			290	84	91	175	271	56	13	11	24	63

=== International ===
Year	Team	Event	Result	GP	G	A	Pts	PIM
2016	Finland	WJC	1st place, gold medalist(s)	7	1	0	1	0
Junior totals				7	1	0	1	0

== Awards and honours ==
Award	Year
Liiga
Kanada-malja (Tappara)	2017
Most Playoff Goals	2017
