= Oskar Nilsson (ice hockey) =

Swedish ice hockey player

- Born: April 12, 1991 (age 34) Luleå, Sweden
- Height: 5 ft 9 in (175 cm)
- Weight: 176 lb (80 kg; 12 st 8 lb)
- Position: Defence
- Shoots: Left
- SHL team Former teams: Skellefteå AIK; Luleå HF; Frisk Asker; IK Oskarshamn
- Playing career: 2010–present

Oskar Nilsson (born April 12, 1991) is a Swedish professional ice hockey defenceman. He is currently playing with Skellefteå AIK of the Swedish Hockey League (SHL).

Nilsson made his Elitserien debut playing with Luleå HF during the 2011–12 Elitserien season.
