= Dominik Lakatoš =

Czech ice hockey player

- Born: 8 April 1997 (age 29) Kolín, Czech Republic
- Height: 6 ft 0 in (183 cm)
- Weight: 194 lb (88 kg; 13 st 12 lb)
- Position: Forward
- Shoots: Left
- ELH team Former teams: BK Mladá Boleslav; HC Bílí Tygři Liberec; HC Benátky nad Jizerou; PSG Berani Zlín; HC Vítkovice; SaiPa
- NHL draft: 157th overall, 2017; New York Rangers
- Playing career: 2015–present

Dominik Lakatoš (born 8 April 1997) is a Czech professional ice hockey player. He is currently playing for BK Mladá Boleslav of the Czech Extraliga (ELH). He was selected by the New York Rangers in the sixth round, 157th overall, of the 2017 NHL entry draft.

== Playing career ==
Lakatoš made his Czech Extraliga debut playing with HC Bílí Tygři Liberec during the 2014–15 Czech Extraliga season.

In the 2018–19 season, Lakatoš was unable to reproduce his previous offensive output with Liberec before he was loaned to fellow ELH club, PSG Berani Zlín, for the remainder of the campaign on 14 November 2018. In his stint with Zlín, Lakatoš regained his scoring touch to compile 4 goals and 13 points in 20 games before he was recalled from his loan by Liberec prior to the ELH trade deadline on 31 January 2019.

On 7 May 2019, Lakatoš left Liberec to sign a two-year contract with fellow ELH club, HC Vítkovice.

== Personal life ==
He is of Roma origin.

== Career statistics ==
=== Regular season and playoffs ===
			Regular season					Playoffs
Season	Team	League	GP	G	A	Pts	PIM	GP	G	A	Pts	PIM
2013–14	HC Bílí Tygři Liberec	Czech20	1	0	0	0	2	—	—	—	—	—
2014–15	HC Bílí Tygři Liberec	Czech20	19	3	10	13	22	6	2	1	3	6
2015–16	HC Bílí Tygři Liberec	ELH	36	7	4	11	22	12	1	4	5	12
2015–16	HC Benátky nad Jizerou	Czech.1	18	5	13	18	14	—	—	—	—	—
2015–16	HC Bílí Tygři Liberec	Czech20	—	—	—	—	—	2	2	2	4	25
2016–17	HC Bílí Tygři Liberec	ELH	41	10	12	22	80	16	8	5	13	8
2016–17	HC Benátky nad Jizerou	Czech.1	7	2	5	7	4	—	—	—	—	—
2017–18	HC Bílí Tygři Liberec	ELH	50	10	11	21	64	10	1	1	2	30
2017–18	HC Benátky nad Jizerou	Czech.1	2	1	1	2	2	—	—	—	—	—
2018–19	HC Bílí Tygři Liberec	ELH	28	0	5	5	22	8	0	2	2	10
2018–19	HC Benátky nad Jizerou	Czech.1	2	1	0	1	2	—	—	—	—	—
2018–19	PSG Berani Zlín	ELH	22	4	9	13	8	—	—	—	—	—
2019–20	HC Vítkovice	ELH	52	14	13	27	50	—	—	—	—	—
2020–21	HC Vítkovice	ELH	48	23	19	42	74	5	1	1	2	14
2021–22	SaiPa	Liiga	15	1	5	6	22	—	—	—	—	—
2021–22	HC Vítkovice	ELH	37	15	19	34	52	9	1	4	5	7
2022–23	HC Vítkovice	ELH	51	18	29	47	53	13	3	3	6	6
2023–24	HC Vítkovice	ELH	44	12	17	29	38	—	—	—	—	—
2024–25	BK Mladá Boleslav	ELH	50	15	22	37	97	11	2	3	5	4
ELH totals			459	128	160	288	560	84	17	23	40	91

=== International ===
Year	Team	Event	Result	GP	G	A	Pts	PIM
2016	Czech Republic	WJC	5th	5	2	0	2	0
Junior totals				5	2	0	2	0
