= 2014–15 Champions Hockey League playoffs =

The playoffs of the 2014–15 Champions Hockey League were played on 4 November 2014 and concluded on 3 February 2015 with the final. A total of 16 teams competed in the playoffs which were drawn on 10 October 2014.

All times are CET (UTC+1).

== Round and draw dates ==
The playoffs were drawn on 10 October 2014 in Helsinki, Finland and the entire playoff bracket was determined in the draw.

Round	Draw date and time	First leg	Second leg
Eighth-finals	10 October 2014, 12:00 CET	4 November 2014	11 November 2014
Quarter-finals	10 October 2014, 12:00 CET	2 December 2014	9 December 2014
Semi-finals	10 October 2014, 12:00 CET	13 January 2014	20 January 2015
Final	10 October 2014, 12:00 CET	3 February 2015	

== Format ==
The eleven group winners and the five best group runners-up qualified for the playoffs, which will begin on 4 November 2014 and end with the final on 3 February 2015. It will be played as a single-elimination tournament, meaning that the losing teams in each round are eliminated from the tournament. The teams will play against each other over two legs on a home-and-away basis with the team with the better standing after the group stage having the second game at home, except for the one-match final played at the venue of the team with the best competition track record leading up to the final.

If the aggregate score after the two legs are equal the match will be decided in 10-minute overtime. If no goals were scored during overtime, the tie will be decided by penalty shootout. In the final, which was played as a single match, if scores are level at the end of normal time, there will be 20 minutes of overtime, followed by penalty shoot-out if scores remained tied.

The mechanism of the draw for playoffs was as follows:

- The entire playoff was drawn at a single occasion on 10 October 2014 to determine the eight pairings for the eighth-finals. After this draw, all games up to the final are set in brackets.
- In the draw for the eighth-finals, the eight best group winners were seeded, and the three group winners with worst record and the five best runners-up were unseeded. The seeded teams were drawn against the unseeded teams, with the seeded teams hosting the second leg. Teams from the same group could not be drawn against each other.

== Qualified teams ==
Eleven group winners and eight runners-up enter the playoffs and the eight group winners with the best group stage record were seeded in the eighth-finals. From quarter-finals and onwards there were no seeding.

The table is ordered by seeding order for the draw which is group position followed by points and goal differential.

Key to colours
Seeded in eighth-finals draw
Unseeded in eighth-finals draw

Group	Team	Group position	Pts	GD
C	(Sweden) Frölunda HC	Winners	15	+22
I	(Austria) Red Bull Salzburg	Winners	15	+15
K	(Finland) Lukko	Winners	15	+14
J	(Sweden) Skellefteå AIK	Winners	15	+12
B	(Austria) Vienna Capitals	Winners	15	+7
F	(Sweden) Linköping HC	Winners	14	+10
D	(Switzerland) Fribourg-Gottéron	Winners	14	+8
H	(Finland) SaiPa	Winners	14	+7
A	(Finland) Oulun Kärpät	Winners	13	+5
G	(Czech Republic) Sparta Prague	Winners	12	+6
E	(Finland) Tappara	Winners	11	+5
K	(Sweden) Luleå Hockey	Runners-up	15	+26
C	(Switzerland) Genève-Servette	Runners-up	15	+13
J	(Finland) HIFK	Runners-up	14	+16
I	(Finland) JYP	Runners-up	13	+4
F	(Finland) TPS	Runners-up	12	+9

== Bracket ==
Eighth-finals
1	(Finland) JYP	5	2	7(2)
16	(Sweden) Skellefteå AIK (SO)	4	3	7(3)
8	(Czech Republic) Sparta Prague	1	2	3
9	(Sweden) Linköping HC	2	2	4
5	(Finland) TPS	1	4	5
12	(Finland) Lukko	5	3	8
4	(Sweden) Luleå Hockey (SO)	2	7	9(2)
13	(Austria) Red Bull Salzburg	4	5	9(0)
6	(Switzerland) Genève-Servette	2	2	4(0)
11	(Finland) SaiPa (SO)	0	4	4(3)
3	(Finland) Oulun Kärpät	3	3	6
14	(Austria) Vienna Capitals	1	2	3
7	(Finland) Tappara	1	2	3
10	(Sweden) Frölunda HC	5	4	9
2	(Switzerland) Fribourg-Gottéron	2	1	3
15	(Finland) HIFK	2	3	5

Quarter-finals
(Sweden) Linköping HC	1	4	5(0)
(Sweden) Skellefteå AIK (SO)	2	3	5(1)
(Finland) Lukko	2	1	3
(Sweden) Luleå Hockey	5	2	7
(Finland) SaiPa	0	2	2
(Finland) Oulun Kärpät	2	3	5
(Finland) HIFK	2	3	5
(Sweden) Frölunda HC	1	5	6

Semi-finals
(Sweden) Skellefteå AIK	2	2	4
(Sweden) Luleå Hockey	2	3	5
(Sweden) Frölunda HC (OT)	4	2	6
(Finland) Oulun Kärpät	2	3	5

Final
(Sweden) Luleå Hockey	4
(Sweden) Frölunda HC	2

Note:

1. The teams listed on top of each tie play first match at home and the bottom team plays second match at home.

== Eighth-finals ==
The draw for the entire playoff (eighth-finals, quarter-finals, semi-finals and final) was held on 10 October 2014. The first legs were played on 4 November, and the second legs were played on 11 November 2014.

Team 1	Agg.	Team 2	1st leg	2nd leg
JYP (Finland)	7–8 (2–3 SO)	(Sweden) Skellefteå AIK	5–4	2–4 (OT)
Genève-Servette (Switzerland)	4–5 (0–3 SO)	(Finland) SaiPa	2–0	2–5 (OT)
Sparta Prague (Czech Republic)	3–4	(Sweden) Linköping HC	1–2	2–2
Oulun Kärpät (Finland)	6–3	(Austria) Vienna Capitals	3–1	3–2
TPS (Finland)	5–8	(Finland) Lukko	1–5	4–3
Tappara (Finland)	3–9	(Sweden) Frölunda HC	1–5	2–4
Luleå Hockey (Sweden)	10–9 (2–0 SO)	(Austria) Red Bull Salzburg	2–4	8–5 (OT)
Fribourg-Gottéron (Switzerland)	3–5	(Finland) HIFK	2–2	1–3

Notes

1. Order of legs reversed after original draw, since HIFK home ice was unavailable on 4 November.

=== First leg ===
4 November 2014; 17:30	JYP (Finland)	5–4 (2–1, 3–0, 0–3)	(Sweden) Skellefteå AIK	Synergia-areena, Jyväskylä; Attendance: 1,757

Game reference

Tuomas Tarkki
Goalies
Erik Hanses

	0–1	6:56 – (PP) Holmström (Forssell, Kabanov)
Hännikäinen (Luoma, Tuppurainen) – 8:30	1–1
Perrin (Pihlman, Hubáček) – 16:33	2–1
Hännikäinen (Boyce, Ikonen) (PP) – 22:17	3–1
Ikonen (Lahti) – 26:03	4–1
Nenonen (Lahti, Salmio) – 38:40	5–1
	5–2	40:58 – Kabanov (Zackrisson, Pettersson)
	5–3	48:15 – Burström
	5–4	50:32 – (PP) Calof (Lindholm, Sundqvist)

4 min
Penalties
4 min

4 November 2014; 17:30	Oulun Kärpät (Finland)	3–1 (2–0, 1–0, 0–1)	(Austria) Vienna Capitals	Oulun Energia Areena, Oulu; Attendance: 4,239

Game reference

Iiro Tarkki
Goalies
Matt Zaba

Masuhr (Donskoi, Kemppainen) – 10:14	1–0
Donskoi (Laatikainen) (PP) – 19:02	2–0
Glenn (Laatikainen, Huml) – 25:15	3–0
	3–1	47:24 – Ferland (Klimbacher)

4 min
Penalties
8 min

4 November 2014; 17:30	TPS (Finland)	1–5 (1–2, 0–2, 0–1)	(Finland) Lukko	HK Areena, Turku; Attendance: 3,642

Game reference

Teemu Lassila
Goalies
Oskari Setänen

	0–1	3:17 – Mikkola (Gagnon)
	0–2	12:22 – Gagnon (Ahtola, Vahalahti)
Koskiranta (Smoleňák, Lasch) (PP, 5 ON 3) – 18:46	1–2
	1–3	25:52 – Forsberg (Niskala)
	1–4	38:05 – (PP) Virtanen (Niskala, Virtanen)
	1–5	54:07 – (PP) Vahalahti (Gagnon, Tommila)

10 min
Penalties
12 min

4 November 2014; 17:30	Tappara (Finland)	1–5 (0–3, 0–1, 1–1)	(Sweden) Frölunda HC	Hakametsa, Tampere; Attendance: 2,546

Game reference

Dominik Hrachovina
Goalies
Linus Fernström

	0–1	8:43 – (PP) Gustafsson (Johnsson, Olimb)
	0–2	10:06 – Bäckman (Karlsson, Janmark)
	0–3	13:32 – Johnsson (Olimb, Görtz)
	0–4	39:57 – (SHG) Blidh (Bäckman)
	0–5	47:40 – Janmark (Lehkonen, Figren)
Erkinjuntti (Peltola, Kolomatis) (SHG) – 54:49	1–5

8 min
Penalties
10 min

4 November 2014; 18:00	Sparta Prague (Czech Republic)	1–2 (0–0, 0–1, 1–1)	(Sweden) Linköping HC	Tipsport Arena, Prague; Attendance: 2,381

Game reference

Rastislav Staňa
Goalies
Marcus Högberg

	0–1	35:13 – Micflikier (Taffe)
	0–2	42:49 – (PP) Karlsson (McDonell, Karlsson)
Cingel (Bahenský, Švrček (PP) – 45:25	1–2

6 min
Penalties
8 min

4 November 2014; 19:45	Genève-Servette (Switzerland)	2–0 (0–0, 2–0, 0–0)	(Finland) SaiPa	Patinoire des Vernets, Geneva; Attendance: 5,214

Game reference
Robert Mayer	Goalies	Jussi Markkanen
Romy (D'Agostini) 28:15 / 1–0; Romy (Kast, Simek – 34:37 / 2–0
31 min	Penalties	4 min

4 November 2014; 19:45	Fribourg-Gottéron (Switzerland)	2–2 (0–0, 1–1, 1–1)	(Finland) HIFK	BCF Arena, Fribourg; Attendance: 1,171

Game reference

Benjamin Conz
Goalies
Ville Husso

Tambellini (Pouliot, NGoy) – 21:08	1–0
	1–1	31:15 – Goldobin (Auvitu, Ikonen)
Wildhaber (Kwiatkowski, Dubé) – 47:11	2–1
	2–2	54:01 – Záborský (Elkins)

8 min
Penalties
8 min

4 November 2014; 20:05	Luleå Hockey (Sweden)	2–4 (0–1, 1–3, 1–0)	(Austria) Red Bull Salzburg	Coop Norrbotten Arena, Luleå; Attendance: 2,559

Game reference

Niko Hovinen
Goalies
Daniel Larsson

	0–1	19:03 – (PP) Milam (Walter, Duncan)
	0–2	24:59 – Sterling (Kutlák, Walter)
	0–3	29:56 – Beach (Welser, Meckler)
Wallmark (Fagerudd, Zaar) – 31:45	1–3
	1–4	32:35 – Kutlák (Sterling, Hughes)
Zaar (Wallmark, Fagerudd) – 58:52	2–4

4 min
Penalties
4 min

=== Second leg ===
11 November 2014; 17:30	SaiPa (Finland)	5–2 (2–0 SO) (2–1, 1–0, 1–1) (OT 0–0) (SO 1–0)	(Switzerland) Genève-Servette	Kisapuisto, Lappeenranta; Attendance: 2,830

Game reference

Jussi Markkanen
Goalies
Christophe Bays

Lofquist (Larsson, McIntyr e) (PP) – 2:24	1–0
	1–1	3:45 – Rivera
Venäläinen (Larsson, Jokinen) – 17:31	2–1
Järvinen (Larsson, McIntyre) (PP) – 33:41	3–1
Tavi (Larsson) – 51:53	4–1
	4–2	59:04 – Rod (Simek)
Mankinen (SOG) – 70:00	5–2

Koho (miss)
Mankinen
McIntyre
Shootout
(miss) D'Agostini
(miss) Pyatt
(miss) Rubin
(miss) Rod
8 min
Penalties
12 min

SaiPa won 5–4 on aggregate after winning 2–0 in a shootout.

11 November 2014; 17:30	Lukko (Finland)	3–4 (0–2, 0–0, 3–2)	(Finland) TPS	Kivikylän Areena, Rauma; Attendance: 2,472

Game reference

Oskari Setänen
Goalies
Teemu Lassila

	0–1	8:58 – (PP) Lasch (Smoleňák, Gysbers)
	0–2	11:11 – (PP) Smoleňák (Lasch, Sointu)
Sipiläinen (Virtanen (SHG) – 40:52	1–2
	1–3	41:30 – (PP, 5 ON 3) Smoleňák (Lasch, Lucenius)
Vahalahti (SHG) – 42:03	2–3
Gagnon (Nurmi, Tommila) (PP) – 48:17	3–3
	3–4	50:58 – Lasch (Nakládal)

10 min
Penalties
6 min

Lukko won 8–5 on aggregate.

11 November 2014; 17:30	HIFK (Finland)	3–1 (0–1, 1–0, 2–0)	(Switzerland) Fribourg-Gottéron	Helsinki Ice Hall, Helsinki; Attendance: 3,809

Game reference

Ville Husso
Goalies
Benjamin Conz

	0–1	12:26 – Dubé (Sprunger, Plüss)
Ikonen (Blomqvist, Leino) – 31:45	1–1
Ikonen (Leino, Goldobin) (PP) – 56:42	2–1
Záborský (Lamberg) (ENG) – 59:59	3–1

6 min
Penalties
8 min

HIFK won 5–3 on aggregate.

11 November 2014; 19:00	Skellefteå AIK (Sweden)	4–2 (3–2 SO) (0–1, 1–0, 2–1) (OT 0–0) (SO 1–0)	(Finland) JYP	Skellefteå Kraft Arena, Skellefteå; Attendance: 2,518

Game reference

Markus Svensson (Pulled at 9:59) Erik Hanses
Goalies
Tuomas Tarkki

	0–1	9:59 – Hännikäinen (Tuppurainen, Löfman)
Calof – 30:08	1–1
	1–2	40:28 – Tuppurainen (Löfman)
Sundqvist (Calof, Lindholm) (PP, EA) – 57:20	2–2
Lindholm (Calof, Heed) (EA) – 59:42	3–2
Lehtonen – 70:00	4–2

Calof (miss)
Forssell
Sundqvist
Norman (miss)
Lehtonen
Shootout
Perrin
Nenonen
(miss) Hubáček
(miss) Tuppurainen
(miss) Ikonen
8 min
Penalties
2 min

Skellefteå AIK won 8–7 on aggregate after winning 3–2 in a shootout.

11 November 2014; 19:00	Linköping HC (Sweden)	2–2 (0–1, 0–0, 2–1)	(Czech Republic) Sparta Prague	Saab Arena, Linköping; Attendance: 2,437

Game reference

David Rautio
Goalies
Filip Novotný

	0–1	1:27 – Hlinka (Přibyl, Buchtele)
Junland (Johansson) (PP) – 47:53	1–1
	1–2	51:16 – Piskáček (Reway)
Micflikier (Karlsson, Taffe) – 59:58	2–2

6 min
Penalties
35 min

Linköping HC won 4–3 on aggregate.

11 November 2014; 19:30	Vienna Capitals (Austria)	2–3 (0–0, 1–2, 1–1)	(Finland) Oulun Kärpät	Albert Schultz Eishalle, Vienna; Attendance: 4,700

Game reference

Matt Zaba
Goalies
Iiro Tarkki

	0–1	28:46 – Keränen (Eminger, Alikoski)
Watkins (Rotter, Nödl) – 32:41	1–1
	1–2	33:12 – Junttila (Glenn, Kemppainen)
	1–3	41:33 – Huml (Haataja, Manninen)
Schlacher (Bauer, Schiechl) – 47:24	2–3

6 min
Penalties
0 min

Oulun Kärpät won 6–3 on aggregate.

11 November 2014; 19:30	Red Bull Salzburg (Austria)	5–8 (0–2 SO) (4–1, 0–5, 1–1) (OT 0–0) (SO 0–1)	(Sweden) Luleå Hockey	Eisarena Salzburg, Salzburg; Attendance: 2,610

Game reference

Niko Hovinen (pulled at 39:42) Bernd Brückler
Goalies
Daniel Larsson (pulled at 12:48) Joel Lassinantti

Raffl (Latusa) – 3:39	1–0
Beach (Meckler, Welser) – 4:47	2–0
Beach (Milam, Fahey (SHG) – 10:43	3–0
	3–1	14:31 – Fogström (Ledin, Dixon)
Meckler (Beach, Trattnig) – 16:32	4–1
	4–2	27:05 – (PP) Dixon (Näkyvä, Nagander)
	4–3	29:45 – Ledin (Fogström)
	4–4	34:25 – Fogström (Forsberg, Fabrucius)
	4–5	35:29 – Petrell (Granström, Näkyvä)
	4–6	39:42 – Zaar (Kukan)
	4–7	49:54 – (PP) Zaar (Ledin, Fagerudd)
Raffl (Trattnig, Heinrich) (PP) – 58:05	5–7
	5–8	70:00 – (SOG) Fogström

Komarek (miss)
Raffl (miss)
Duncan (miss)
Trattnig (miss)
Shootout
(miss) Sandström
(miss) Zaar
Fogström
Forsberg
10 min
Penalties
8 min

Luleå Hockey won 10–9 on aggregate after winning 2–0 in a shootout.

11 November 2014; 20:05	Frölunda HC (Sweden)	4–2 (2–0, 1–0, 1–2)	(Finland) Tappara	Frölundaborg, Gothenburg; Attendance: 4,770

Game reference

Lars Johansson
Goalies
Juha Metsola

Johnsson (Lehkonen, Figren) (PP) – 4:31	1–0
Widerström (Bäckman, Kahnberg) – 8:07	2–0
Rosseli Olsen (Johnsson, Olimb) – 35:15	3–0
	3–1	42:57 – da Costa
Görtz (Blidh) (PP) – 47:14	4–1
	4–2	48:40 – Jormakka

8 min
Penalties
6 min

Frölunda HC won 9–3 on aggregate.

== Quarter-finals ==
The first legs were played on 2 December, and the second legs were played on 9 December 2014.

Team 1	Agg.	Team 2	1st leg	2nd leg
Linköping HC (Sweden)	5–6 (0–1 SO)	(Sweden) Skellefteå AIK	1–2	4–4 (OT)
Lukko (Finland)	3–7	(Sweden) Luleå Hockey	2–5	1–2
SaiPa (Finland)	2–5	(Finland) Oulun Kärpät	0–2	2–3
HIFK (Finland)	5–6	(Sweden) Frölunda HC	2–1	3–5

=== First leg ===
2 December 2014; 17:30	Lukko (Finland)	2–5 (1–3, 1–1, 0–1)	(Sweden) Luleå Hockey	Kivikylän Areena, Rauma; Attendance: 2,224

Game reference

Oskari Setänen
Goalies
Daniel Larsson

Niskala (Piitulainen, Virtanen) – 8:50	1–0
	1–1	9:49 – Näkyvä (Nagander, Petrell)
	1–2	16:08 – Fogström (Näkyvä, Petrell)
	1–3	16:25 – Fabricius (Fogström, Näkyvä)
	1–4	34:35 – Sylvegård
Riska (Sipiläinen, Mikkola) (SHG) – 37:59	2–4
	2–5	41:57 – (PP) Abbott, (Fagerudd, Fogström)

6 min
Penalties
6 min

2 December 2014; 17:30	SaiPa (Finland)	0–2 (0–0, 0–2, 0–0)	(Finland) Oulun Kärpät	Kisapuisto, Lappeenranta; Attendance: 2,187

Game reference
Jussi Markkanen	Goalies	Iiro Tarkki
0–1 / 22:57 – (PP) Donskoi (Haataja, Huml); 0–2 / 33:44 – Donskoi (Kemppainen)
8 min	Penalties	16 min

2 December 2014; 17:30	HIFK (Finland)	2–1 (1–1, 1–0, 0–0)	(Sweden) Frölunda HC	Helsinki Ice Hall, Helsinki; Attendance: 4,858

Game reference

Ville Husso
Goalies
Linus Fernström

Záborský – 0:34	1–0
	1–1	12:23 – Olimb (Gustafsson)
Záborský (Kuparinen, Grillfors) (PP) – 24:56	2–1

12 min
Penalties
16 min

2 December 2014; 20:05	Linköping HC (Sweden)	1–2 (1–1, 0–1, 0–0)	(Sweden) Skellefteå AIK	Saab Arena, Linköping; Attendance: 2,276

Game reference

Marcus Högberg
Goalies
Erik Hanses

Little (Hardt, Sjögren) – 4:51	1–0
	1–1	18:39 – Aho (Lindholm, Sundqvist)
	1–2	39:46 – Sundqvist (Widing, Ševc)

6 min
Penalties
6 min

=== Second leg ===
9 December 2014; 17:30	Oulun Kärpät (Finland)	3–2 (0–1, 1–0, 2–1)	(Finland) SaiPa	Oulun Energia Areena, Oulu; Attendance: 3,492

Game reference

Jussi Markkanen
Goalies
Iiro Tarkki

	0–1	15:30 – Järvinen (Maalahti, Spina)
Kemppainen (Kukkonen, Masuhr) – 39:59	1–1
Donskoi (Kemppainen, Aho) – 43:19	2–1
	2–2	48:26 – (PP) Lofquist (Spina, Maalahti)
Keränen (Haataja, Spang) – 55:30	3–2

8 min
Penalties
14 min

Oulun Kärpät won 5–2 on aggregate.

9 December 2014; 18:30	Luleå Hockey (Sweden)	2–1 (0–0, 2–0, 2–1)	(Finland) Lukko	Coop Norrbotten Arena, Luleå; Attendance: 3,252

Game reference

Joel Lassinantti
Goalies
Oskari Setänen

Fagerudd (Fogström, Abbott) (PP) – 34:01	1–0
Abbott (Abbott, Sylvegård) – 34:19	2–0
	2–1	59:14 – Virtanen (Kousa, Nurmi)

2 min
Penalties
4 min

Luleå Hockey won 7–3 on aggregate.

9 December 2014; 19:00	Frölunda HC (Sweden)	5–3 (1–0, 1–1, 3–2)	(Finland) HIFK	Frölundaborg, Gothenburg; Attendance: 3,560

Game reference

Lars Johansson
Goalies
Ville Husso

Rosseli Olsen (Olimb, Gustafsson) (PP) – 15:30	1–0
Johnsson (Görtz, Bohm) – 21:47	2–0
	2–1	25:40 – Leino (Goldobin)
	2–2	44:04 – Elkins (Blomqvist, Honkaheimo)
Figren (Falth, Wikstrand) – 46:13	3–2
Olimb (Gustafsson, Johnsson) – 47:34	4–2
	4–3	52:22 – Leino (Goldobin)
Figren (Janmark, Bäckman) – 59:10	5–3

10 min
Penalties
74 min

Frölunda HC won 6–5 on aggregate.

9 December 2014; 20:05	Skellefteå AIK (Sweden)	4–4 (1–0 SO) (1–1, 1–1, 1–2) (OT 0–0) (SO 1–0)	(Sweden) Linköping HC	Skellefteå Kraft Arena, Skellefteå; Attendance: 2,812

Game reference

Erik Hanses
Goalies
David Rautio

	0–1	9:02 – Almtorp (Sundh, Forsling)
Widing (Sundqvist) – 13:24	1–1
	1—2	33:47 – Andersson (Forsling, McDonell)
Sundqvist (Lindholm, Lindgren) – 38:08	2—2
Lundberg (Burström, Petterström) – 50:17	3–2
	3–3	54:54 – (PP) Micflikier
	3–4	58:58 – (PP, EA) Little (Forsling, Johansson)
Schremp – 70:00	4–4

Forssell (miss)
Sundqvist (miss)
Schremp
Zackrisson (miss)
Shootout
(miss) Törnqvist
(miss) Vrána
(miss) McDonell
(miss) Micflikier
(miss) Little
29 min
Penalties
12 min

Skellefteå AIK won 6–5 on aggregate after winning 1–0 in a shootout.

== Semi-finals ==
The first legs were played on 13 January, and the second legs were played on 20 January 2015.

Team 1	Agg.	Team 2	1st leg	2nd leg
Skellefteå AIK (Sweden)	4–5	(Sweden) Luleå Hockey	2–2	2–3
Frölunda HC (Sweden)	6–5	(Finland) Oulun Kärpät	4–2	2–3 (OT)

=== First leg ===
13 January 2015; 19:00	Skellefteå AIK (Sweden)	2–2 (0–1, 1–0, 1–1)	(Sweden) Luleå Hockey	Skellefteå Kraft Arena, Skellefteå; Attendance: 3,304

Game reference

Markus Svensson
Goalies
Joel Lassinantti
Referees:
(Russia) Alexei Anisimov
(Switzerland) Marc Wiegand
Linesmen:
(Sweden) Emil Yletyinen
(Sweden) Johannes Käck

	0–1	01:32 – L. Bryggman (A. Hjelm)
A. Lindholm (E. Andersson) – 34:14	1–1
P. Zackrisson (P. Petterström) – 43:29	2–1
	2–2	58:57 – K. Näkyvä (D. Zaar) (PP)

34 min
Penalties
10 min

13 January 2015; 19:00	Frölunda HC (Sweden)	4–2 (1–1, 3–0, 0–1)	(Finland) Oulun Kärpät	Frölundaborg, Gothenburg; Attendance: 2,584

Game reference

Lars Johansson
Goalies
Tomi Karhunen
Referees:
(Switzerland) Daniel Stricker
(Germany) Lars Bruggemann
Linesmen:
(Sweden) Henrik Pihlblad
(Sweden) Tobias Haster

M. Görtz (E. Fälth, M. Wikstrand) – 00:21	1–0
	1–1	02:02 – J. Junttila
R. Figren (J. Nyberg, L. Johansson) – 28:27	2–1
E. Fälth (M. Wikstrand, A. Johnson) (PP) – 32:53	3–1
A. Blidh (M. Janmark, M. Görtz) – 38:28	4–1
	4–2	51:30 – M. Pyörälä (M. Nutivaara)

18 min
Penalties
8 min

=== Second leg ===
20 January 2015; 17:30	Oulun Kärpät (Finland)	3–2 (OT) (1–1, 0–0, 2–0) (OT 0–1)	(Sweden) Frölunda HC	Oulun Energia Areena, Oulu; Attendance: 5,868

Game reference

Tomi Karhunen
Goalies
Lars Johansson

Donskoi (Pirnes, Masuhr) (PP) – 4:07	1–0
	1–1	7:26 – (PP) Janmark (Gustafsson, Lundqvist)
Pirnes (Masuhr, Komulainen) (PP) – 48:37	2–1
Junttila (Pemppainen) – 49:09	3–1
	3–2	65:06 – (PP) Gustafsson (Olimb, Falth)

14 min
Penalties
16 min

Frölunda HC won 6–5 on aggregate.

20 January 2015; 19:00	Luleå Hockey (Sweden)	3–2 (2–1, 1–0, 0–1)	(Sweden) Skellefteå AIK	Coop Norrbotten Arena, Luleå; Attendance: 5,540

Game reference

Joel Lassinantti
Goalies
Erik Hanses

Fabricius (Forsberg, Fogström) – 5:51	1–0
	1–1	7:17 – (PP) Heed (Zackrisson, Forssell)
Zaar (Granström, Nagander) – 14:06	2–1
Sandström (Fagerudd, Cehlárik) (PP) – 38:34	3–1
	3–2	58:51 – (SHG, EA) Lundberg (Forssell, Kabanov)

26 min
Penalties
32 min

Luleå Hockey won 5–4 on aggregate.

== Final ==
The final was played on 3 February 2015 at the venue of the team with the best competition track record leading up to the final.

3 February 2015; 20:15	Luleå HF (Sweden)	4–2 (0–2, 0–0, 4–0)	(Sweden) Frölunda HC	Coop Norrbotten Arena, Luleå; Attendance: 6,300

Game reference

Joel Lassinantti
Goalies
Linus Fernström
Referees:
(Germany) Daniel Piechaczek
(Finland) Aleksi Rantala
Linesmen:
(Germany) André Schrader
(Finland) Sakari Suominen

	0–1	00:17 – Lundqvist (Lehkonen, Fälth)
	0–2	12:45 – Olimb (Johnsson, Görtz)
Näkyvä (Abbott) (PP) – 47:43	1–2
Cehlárik (Fagerudd, Näkyvä) (PP) – 48:57	2–2
Forsberg (Sandström) (PP) – 53:04	3–2
Kukan (Sandström, Granström) (ENG) – 58:36	4–2

8 min
Penalties
45 min
25
Shots
27
