= Fagerudd =

Fagerudd is a Swedish surname. Notable people with the surname include:

- Marcus Fagerudd (born 1992), Finnish-Swedish ice hockey player
- Markus Fagerudd (born 1961), Finnish composer
