= Jarno Paven =

Finnish ice hockey player

Jarno Pavén
- Born: May 20, 1993 (age 31); Turku, Finland
- Height: 5 ft 9 in (175 cm)
- Weight: 157 lb (71 kg; 11 st 3 lb)
- Position: Defence
- Shoots: Right
- SM-liiga team: HC TPS
- Playing career: 2012–present

Jarno Pavén (born May 20, 1993) is a Finnish ice hockey defenceman. He is currently playing with HC TPS in the Finnish SM-liiga.

Pavén made his SM-liiga debut playing with HC TPS during the 2012–13 SM-liiga season.
