= Jasse Ikonen =

Finnish ice hockey player

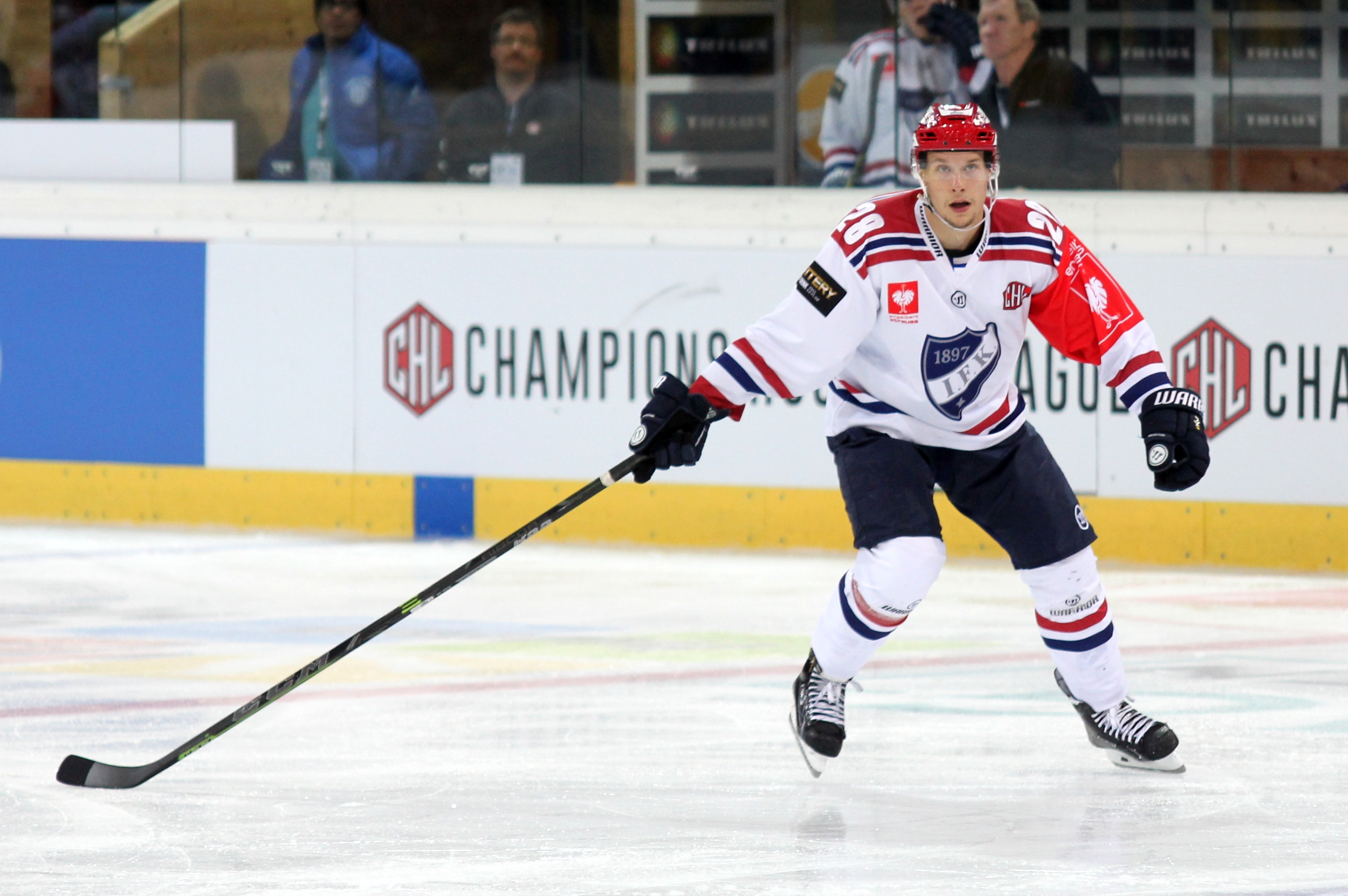
- CHL, HC Davos vs. IFK Helsinki, 6th October 2015
- Born: June 13, 1990 (age 35) Kuopio, Finland
- Height: 6 ft 0 in (183 cm)
- Weight: 190 lb (86 kg; 13 st 8 lb)
- Position: Forward
- Shoots: Left
- SHL team Former teams: Färjestad BK; KalPa; JYP; HIFK; Oulun Kärpät; Ilves; Ässät; HC Pustertal Wölfe; HC TPS; Linköping HC
- Playing career: 2008–present

Jasse Ikonen (born June 13, 1990) is a Finnish professional ice hockey player. He is currently playing with Färjestad BK in the Swedish Hockey League (SHL).

Ikonen previously played in the Finnish Liiga with KalPa, JYP, HIFK, Oulun Kärpät, Ilves, Ässät and HC TPS.

== Career statistics ==
| | | | Regular season | | | | | Playoffs |
| Season | Team | League | GP | G | A | Pts | PIM | GP | G | A | Pts | PIM |
|---|---|---|---|---|---|---|---|---|---|---|---|---|
| 2007–08 | KalPa | Liiga | 1 | 0 | 0 | 0 | 0 | — | — | — | — | — |
| 2008–09 | KalPa | Liiga | 9 | 0 | 0 | 0 | 4 | 2 | 0 | 0 | 0 | 0 |
| 2008–09 | Suomi U20 | Mestis | 8 | 2 | 2 | 4 | 4 | — | — | — | — | — |
| 2009–10 | D Team | Liiga | 26 | 10 | 7 | 17 | 34 | — | — | — | — | — |
| 2009–10 | Suomi U20 | Liiga | 7 | 2 | 1 | 3 | 8 | — | — | — | — | — |
| 2009–10 | JYP Jyväskylä | Liiga | 13 | 2 | 2 | 4 | 4 | — | — | — | — | — |
| 2010–11 | JYP Jyväskylä | Liiga | 5 | 0 | 0 | 0 | 2 | — | — | — | — | — |
| 2010–11 | D Team | Mestis | 22 | 7 | 4 | 11 | 24 | — | — | — | — | — |
| 2011–12 | KalPa | Liiga | 58 | 12 | 9 | 21 | 82 | 6 | 0 | 2 | 2 | 0 |
| 2012–13 | KalPa | Liiga | 41 | 3 | 11 | 14 | 30 | 5 | 0 | 0 | 0 | 8 |
| 2012–13 | SaPKo | Mestis | 1 | 0 | 0 | 0 | 0 | — | — | — | — | — |
| 2013–14 | KalPa | Liiga | 20 | 2 | 3 | 5 | 10 | — | — | — | — | — |
| 2013–14 | HIFK | Liiga | 27 | 2 | 8 | 10 | 8 | 2 | 0 | 0 | 0 | 0 |
| 2014–15 | HIFK | Liiga | 29 | 10 | 6 | 16 | 54 | — | — | — | — | — |
| 2015–16 | HIFK | Liiga | 55 | 19 | 10 | 29 | 10 | 18 | 6 | 4 | 10 | 2 |
| 2016–17 | HIFK | Liiga | 49 | 7 | 6 | 13 | 4 | 3 | 1 | 1 | 2 | 2 |
| 2017–18 | Oulun Kärpät | Liiga | 44 | 4 | 4 | 8 | 8 | 14 | 1 | 1 | 2 | 8 |
| 2018–19 | Oulun Kärpät | Liiga | 24 | 2 | 4 | 6 | 10 | — | — | — | — | — |
| 2018–19 | HIFK | Liiga | 23 | 3 | 7 | 10 | 8 | 13 | 0 | 1 | 1 | 26 |
| 2019–20 | Ilves | Liiga | 56 | 10 | 7 | 17 | 24 | — | — | — | — | — |
| 2020–21 | Ässät | Liiga | 36 | 4 | 7 | 11 | 14 | — | — | — | — | — |
| 2021–22 | HC Pustertal Wölfe | ICEHL | 41 | 6 | 8 | 14 | 18 | 4 | 0 | 0 | 0 | 2 |
| 2022–23 | HC TPS | Liiga | 15 | 2 | 2 | 4 | 0 | — | — | — | — | — |
| 2022–23 | Linköping HC | SHL | 12 | 1 | 4 | 5 | 2 | — | — | — | — | — |
| Liiga totals | | | 505 | 82 | 86 | 168 | 272 | 63 | 8 | 9 | 17 | 46 |
| SHL totals | | | 12 | 1 | 4 | 5 | 2 | — | — | — | — | — |
