= Vladimír Eminger =

Czech professional ice hockey defenceman

Vladimir Eminger
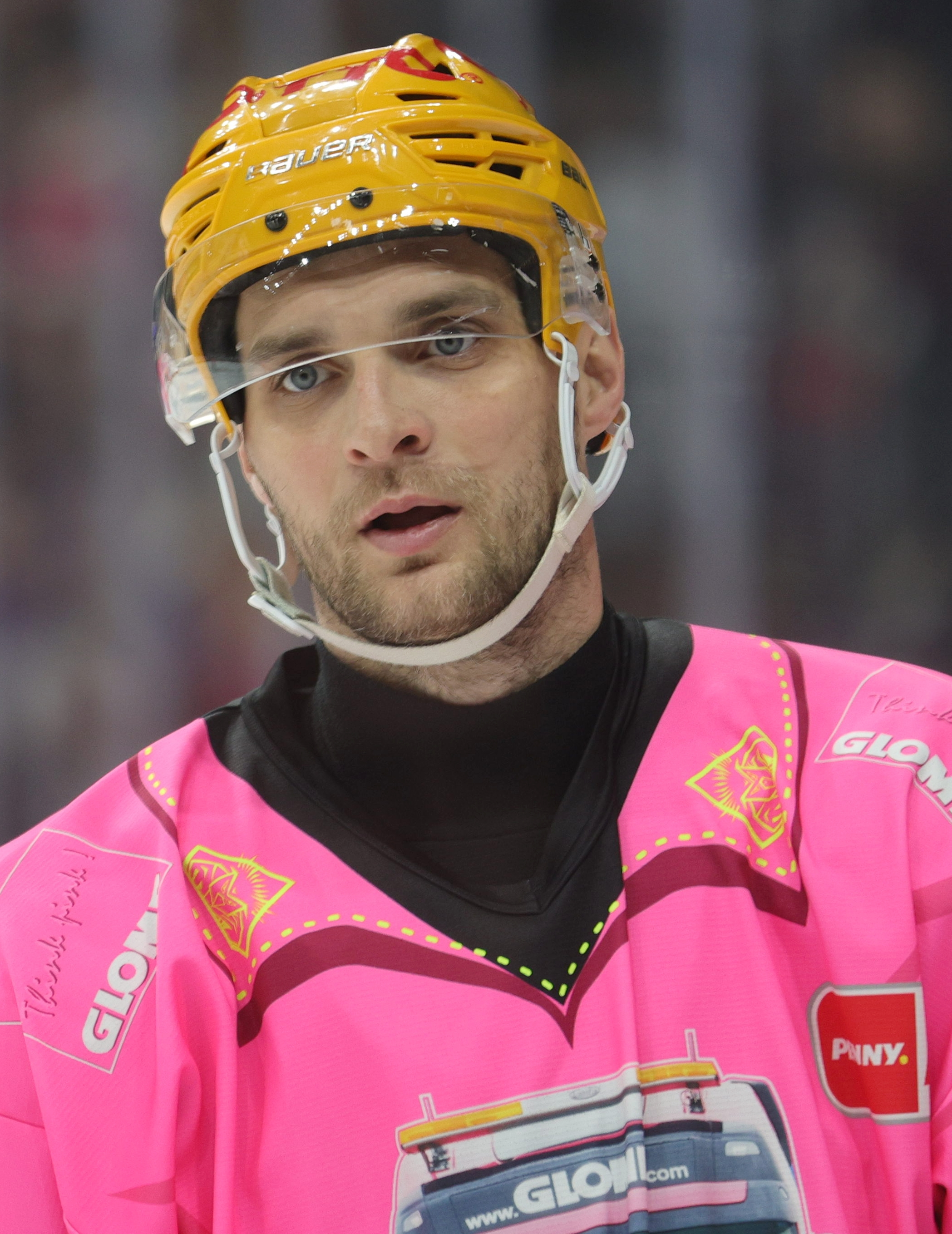
- Born: 3 April 1992 (age 34) Litvinov, Czech Republic
- Height: 6 ft 2 in (188 cm)
- Weight: 190 lb (86 kg; 13 st 8 lb)
- Position: Defence
- Shoots: Right
- DEL team Former teams: Fischtown Pinguins; Oulun Kärpät; HC Sparta Praha; BK Mladá Boleslav; HC Karlovy Vary
- Playing career: 2012–present

Vladimir Eminger (born 3 April 1992) is a Czech professional ice hockey defenceman. He is currently playing with the Fischtown Pinguins of the Deutsche Eishockey Liga (DEL).

Eminger made his SM-liiga debut playing with Oulun Kärpät during the 2012–13 SM-liiga season.
