= Markus Hännikäinen =

Finnish ice hockey player

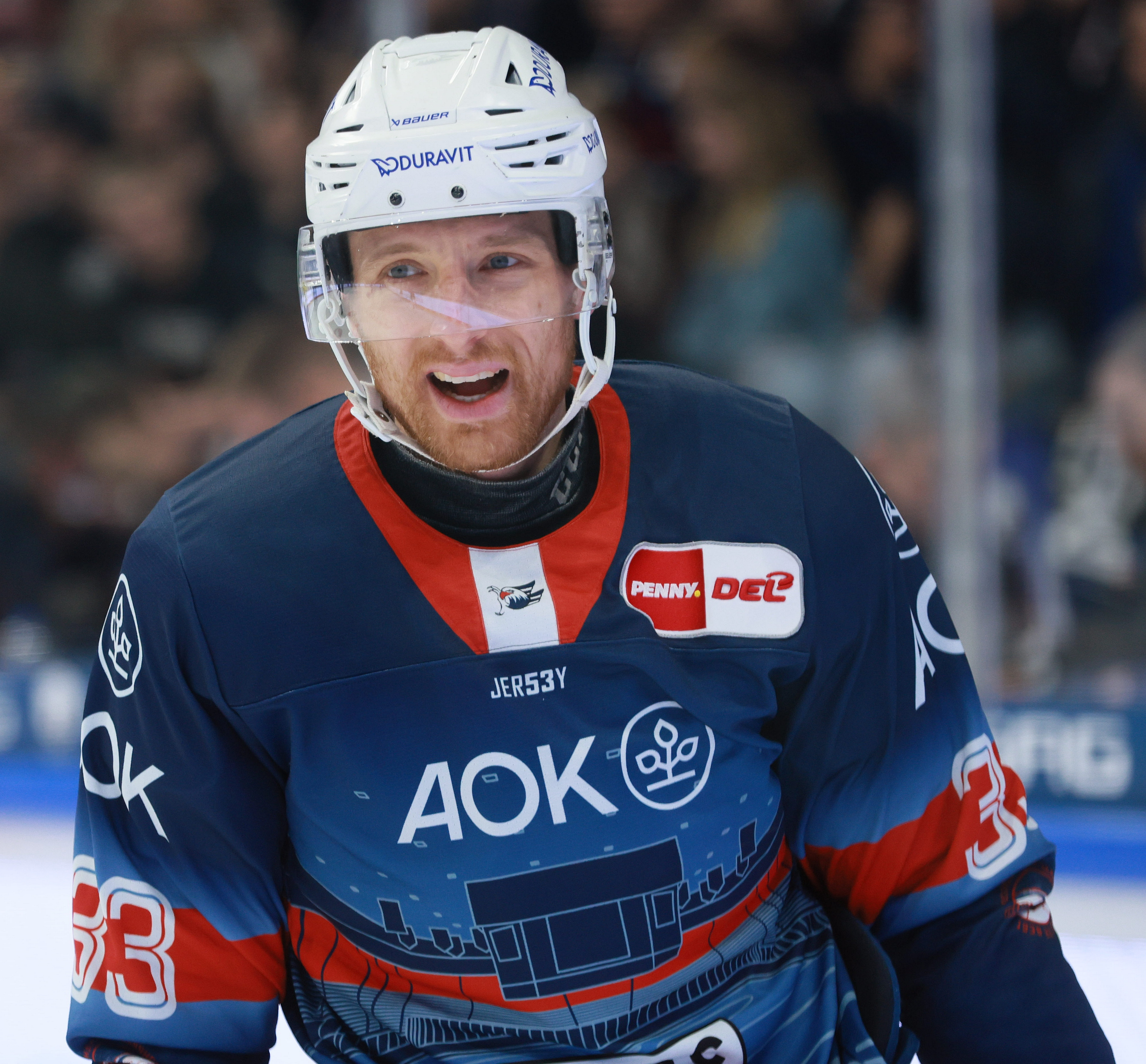
- Hännikäinen with the Adler Mannheim in 2025
- Born: 26 March 1993 (age 33) Helsinki, Finland
- Height: 6 ft 1 in (185 cm)
- Weight: 200 lb (91 kg; 14 st 4 lb)
- Position: Left wing
- Shoots: Left
- ELH team Former teams: HC Litvínov; HPK; JYP Jyväskylä; Columbus Blue Jackets; Jokerit; Linköping HC; Adler Mannheim
- National team: Finland
- NHL draft: Undrafted
- Playing career: 2011–present

Markus Mikael Hännikäinen (born 26 March 1993) is a Finnish professional ice hockey player who is currently under contract with HC Litvínov in the Czech Extraliga (ELH).

== Playing career ==
Hännikäinen recorded a break-out season with 19 goals and 27 assists for 46 points with 51 penalty minutes and a +22 plus/minus rating in 60 games with JYP Jyväskylä in the 2014–15 season. After Hännikäinen's Liiga team, JYP Jyväskylä was eliminated from the playoffs by Oulun Kärpät it was announced on 20 April 2015 that Hännikäinen had signed a two-year entry-level contract with the Columbus Blue Jackets.

On 21 January 2017, during an afternoon game against the Carolina Hurricanes, Hännikäinen scored his first NHL goal. He recorded his first NHL assist on February 25, 2017, against the New York Islanders. On 21 March 2017, he signed a two-year contract extension through to 2019 with the Blue Jackets.

In his first full season with the Blue Jackets in 2018–19, Hännikäinen recorded four goals and three assists for seven points with two penalty minutes in 44 games with the Blue Jackets, setting single-season career highs in goals, points and games played.

On 18 June 2019, Hännikäinen as an impending restricted free agent agree to a one-year contract extension with the Blue Jackets. Approaching his fifth year within the Blue Jackets organization in the 2019–20 season, Hännikäinen was unable to retain his roster spot and was familiarly assigned to the Cleveland Monsters. Having made 28 appearances with the Monsters, on 24 February 2020, Hännikäinen was traded by Blue Jackets to the Arizona Coyotes in exchange for a conditional seventh-round pick in 2020. He was assigned to AHL affiliate, the Tucson Roadrunners, adding 3 goals in 7 appearances before the season was abandoned due to the COVID-19 pandemic.

As a free agent from the Coyotes, and with the following season to be affected by the ongoing pandemic, Hännikäinen opted to remain in his native Finland by returning to original club, Jokerit of the Kontinental Hockey League (KHL), on 16 December 2020.

During the 2021–22 season, Hännikäinen posted 16 points through 44 regular season games before Jokerit withdrew from the KHL due to the Russian invasion of Ukraine. As a free agent from Jokerit, Hännikäinen completed the season with Adler Mannheim of the Deutsche Eishockey Liga.

On 28 May 2022, Hännikäinen opted to sign a one-year contract with Swedish club, Linköping HC of the SHL, for the 2022–23 season. In 46 regular season games, Hännikäinen added 8 goals and 11 assists for 19 points. Unable to help propel Linköping to the post-season, Hännikäinen left the club as a free agent on 15 March 2023.

Hännikäinen returned to former club, Adler Mannheim of the DEL, after signing a one-year contract for the 2023–24 season on 10 August 2023.

== Career statistics ==
=== Regular season and playoffs ===
| | | | Regular season | | | | | Playoffs |
| Season | Team | League | GP | G | A | Pts | PIM | GP | G | A | Pts | PIM |
|---|---|---|---|---|---|---|---|---|---|---|---|---|
| 2011–12 | Jokerit | SM-l | 15 | 0 | 0 | 0 | 4 | — | — | — | — | — |
| 2011–12 | Kiekko-Vantaa | Mestis | 10 | 2 | 0 | 2 | 4 | — | — | — | — | — |
| 2012–13 | Jokerit | SM-l | 20 | 0 | 1 | 1 | 4 | 1 | 0 | 0 | 0 | 0 |
| 2012–13 | Kiekko-Vantaa | Mestis | 21 | 3 | 6 | 9 | 4 | — | — | — | — | — |
| 2013–14 | Jokerit | Liiga | 18 | 3 | 3 | 6 | 4 | 2 | 1 | 0 | 1 | 0 |
| 2013–14 | Kiekko-Vantaa | Mestis | 15 | 2 | 5 | 7 | 2 | — | — | — | — | — |
| 2013–14 | HPK | Liiga | 4 | 0 | 0 | 0 | 4 | — | — | — | — | — |
| 2014–15 | JYP | Liiga | 60 | 19 | 27 | 46 | 51 | 12 | 4 | 5 | 9 | 6 |
| 2015–16 | Lake Erie Monsters | AHL | 50 | 7 | 13 | 20 | 20 | 16 | 3 | 7 | 10 | 2 |
| 2015–16 | Columbus Blue Jackets | NHL | 4 | 0 | 0 | 0 | 0 | — | — | — | — | — |
| 2016–17 | Cleveland Monsters | AHL | 57 | 19 | 18 | 37 | 22 | — | — | — | — | — |
| 2016–17 | Columbus Blue Jackets | NHL | 10 | 1 | 1 | 2 | 6 | — | — | — | — | — |
| 2017–18 | Columbus Blue Jackets | NHL | 33 | 3 | 3 | 6 | 6 | — | — | — | — | — |
| 2017–18 | Cleveland Monsters | AHL | 8 | 0 | 3 | 3 | 0 | — | — | — | — | — |
| 2018–19 | Columbus Blue Jackets | NHL | 44 | 4 | 3 | 7 | 2 | 1 | 0 | 0 | 0 | 0 |
| 2019–20 | Cleveland Monsters | AHL | 28 | 7 | 11 | 18 | 6 | — | — | — | — | — |
| 2019–20 | Tucson Roadrunners | AHL | 7 | 3 | 1 | 4 | 0 | — | — | — | — | — |
| 2020–21 | Jokerit | KHL | 21 | 5 | 3 | 8 | 8 | 4 | 0 | 0 | 0 | 0 |
| 2021–22 | Jokerit | KHL | 44 | 5 | 11 | 16 | 13 | — | — | — | — | — |
| 2021–22 | Adler Mannheim | DEL | 14 | 2 | 3 | 5 | 4 | 9 | 1 | 3 | 4 | 2 |
| 2022–23 | Linköping HC | SHL | 46 | 8 | 11 | 19 | 10 | — | — | — | — | — |
| 2023–24 | Adler Mannheim | DEL | 51 | 7 | 15 | 22 | 16 | 2 | 0 | 1 | 1 | 2 |
| 2024–25 | Adler Mannheim | DEL | 47 | 12 | 12 | 24 | 10 | 10 | 0 | 3 | 3 | 2 |
| Liiga totals | | | 117 | 22 | 31 | 53 | 67 | 15 | 5 | 5 | 10 | 6 |
| NHL totals | | | 91 | 8 | 7 | 15 | 14 | 1 | 0 | 0 | 0 | 0 |
| KHL totals | | | 65 | 10 | 14 | 24 | 21 | 4 | 0 | 0 | 0 | 0 |

=== International ===
| Year | Team | Event | Result | GP | G | A | Pts | PIM |
|---|---|---|---|---|---|---|---|---|
| 2011 | Finland | U18 | 5th | 6 | 1 | 0 | 1 | 0 |
| 2012 | Finland | WJC | 4th | 7 | 0 | 1 | 1 | 0 |
| 2013 | Finland | WJC | 7th | 6 | 0 | 0 | 0 | 8 |
| 2017 | Finland | WC | 4th | 10 | 2 | 1 | 3 | 2 |
| Junior totals | | | | 19 | 1 | 1 | 2 | 8 |
| Senior totals | | | | 10 | 2 | 1 | 3 | 2 |

== Awards and honours ==
| Awards | Year |
|---|---|
AHL
| Calder Cup (Lake Erie Monsters) | 2016 |
