= Per Savilahti-Nagander =

Swedish ice hockey player

Per Savilahti-Nagander-Åsten-Jalasto
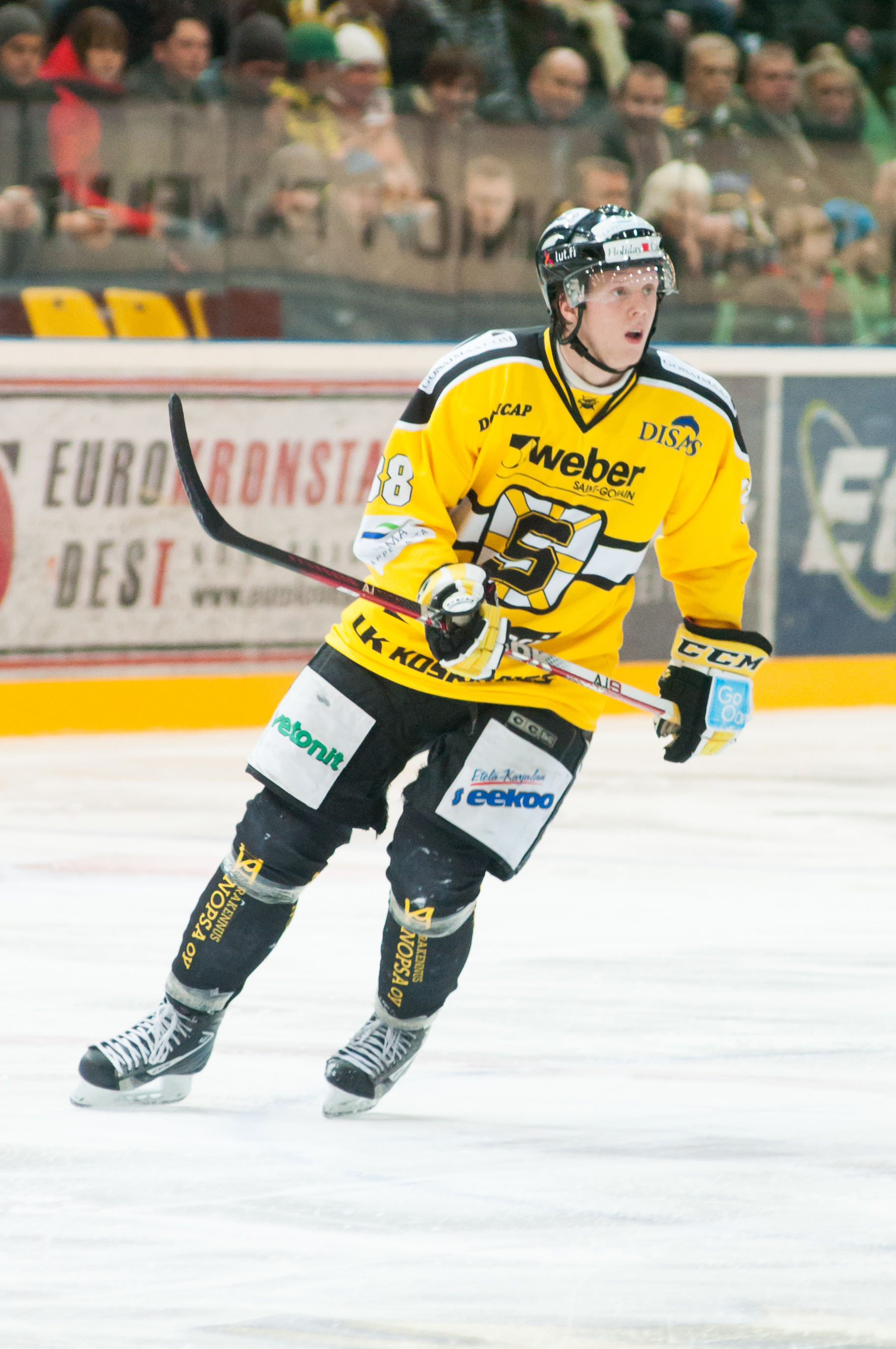
- Born: April 22, 1985 (age 41) Luleå, Sweden
- Height: 6 ft 5 in (196 cm)
- Weight: 236 lb (107 kg; 16 st 12 lb)
- Position: Defence
- Shot: Right
- Played for: Luleå HF; Piteå HC; IF Björklöven; AIK IF; SaiPa; Jukurit; HC TPS; Herlev Eagles; Bodens Hockey
- Playing career: 2003–2020

Per Savilahti-Nagander, commonly referred to as Per Savilahti, (born April 22, 1985) is a Swedish professional ice hockey defenceman. He currently plays for SaiPa in the Finnish Liiga.

Savilahti has formerly played with hometown club, Luleå HF in the Swedish Hockey League (SHL). During the 2015–16 season, while in his third tenure with Luleå, Savilahti appeared in just 14 games for 2 assists before opting to return to SaiPa of the Liiga on November 21, 2015.

== Career statistics ==
			Regular season					Playoffs
Season	Team	League	GP	G	A	Pts	PIM	GP	G	A	Pts	PIM
2000–01	Luleå HF J18	J18 Allsvenskan	13	1	2	3	16	—	—	—	—	—
2001–02	Luleå HF J18	J18 Allsvenskan	12	2	8	10	55	3	0	1	1	4
2001–02	Luleå HF J20	J20 SuperElit	2	0	0	0	2	2	0	0	0	4
2002–03	Luleå HF J20	J20 SuperElit	30	3	4	7	38	—	—	—	—	—
2002–03	Luleå HF	Elitserien	1	0	0	0	0	—	—	—	—	—
2003–04	Luleå HF J20	J20 SuperElit	34	8	9	17	50	—	—	—	—	—
2003–04	Luleå HF	Elitserien	12	0	0	0	2	5	0	0	0	0
2004–05	Luleå HF J20	J20 SuperElit	11	1	8	9	22	7	1	2	3	24
2004–05	Luleå HF	Elitserien	25	0	1	1	14	4	0	0	0	8
2004–05	Piteå HC	Allsvenskan	18	1	5	6	22	—	—	—	—	—
2005–06	Luleå HF J20	J20 SuperElit	11	1	4	5	47	—	—	—	—	—
2005–06	Luleå HF	Elitserien	41	1	1	2	40	6	0	1	1	27
2006–07	Luleå HF J20	J20 SuperElit	1	0	1	1	0	—	—	—	—	—
2006–07	Luleå HF	Elitserien	55	2	3	5	44	4	0	0	0	4
2006–07	IF Björklöven	HockeyAllsvenskan	3	0	0	0	2	—	—	—	—	—
2007–08	Luleå HF J20	J20 SuperElit	3	0	1	1	2	—	—	—	—	—
2007–08	Luleå HF	Elitserien	34	1	3	4	22	—	—	—	—	—
2008–09	AIK IF	HockeyAllsvenskan	34	4	4	8	40	10	1	1	2	8
2009–10	AIK IF	HockeyAllsvenskan	49	3	9	12	90	10	0	3	3	10
2010–11	SaiPa	SM-liiga	54	1	7	8	92	—	—	—	—	—
2010–11	Jukurit	Mestis	3	1	0	1	0	—	—	—	—	—
2011–12	SaiPa	SM-liiga	60	8	13	21	50	—	—	—	—	—
2012–13	SaiPa	SM-liiga	41	4	11	15	46	3	0	1	1	8
2013–14	SaiPa	Liiga	54	6	16	22	90	13	5	2	7	14
2014–15	Luleå HF	SHL	49	2	5	7	55	8	0	0	0	25
2015–16	Luleå HF	SHL	14	0	2	2	4	—	—	—	—	—
2015–16	SaiPa	Liiga	36	3	3	6	14	6	0	0	0	4
2016–17	SaiPa	Liiga	38	1	4	5	20	—	—	—	—	—
2016–17	HC TPS	Liiga	10	0	0	0	6	6	0	1	1	6
2017–18	SaiPa	Liiga	46	1	5	6	36	8	0	0	0	0
2018–19	Herlev Eagles	Denmark	29	1	7	8	39	6	0	1	1	8
2019–20	Boden Hockey	Hockeyettan	31	2	3	5	22	6	0	2	2	8
SHL/Elitserien totals			231	6	15	21	181	27	0	1	1	64
Liiga/SM-liiga totals			339	24	59	83	354	36	5	4	9	32
Denmark totals			29	1	7	8	39	6	0	1	1	8
