= Kristian Näkyvä =

Finnish ice hockey player

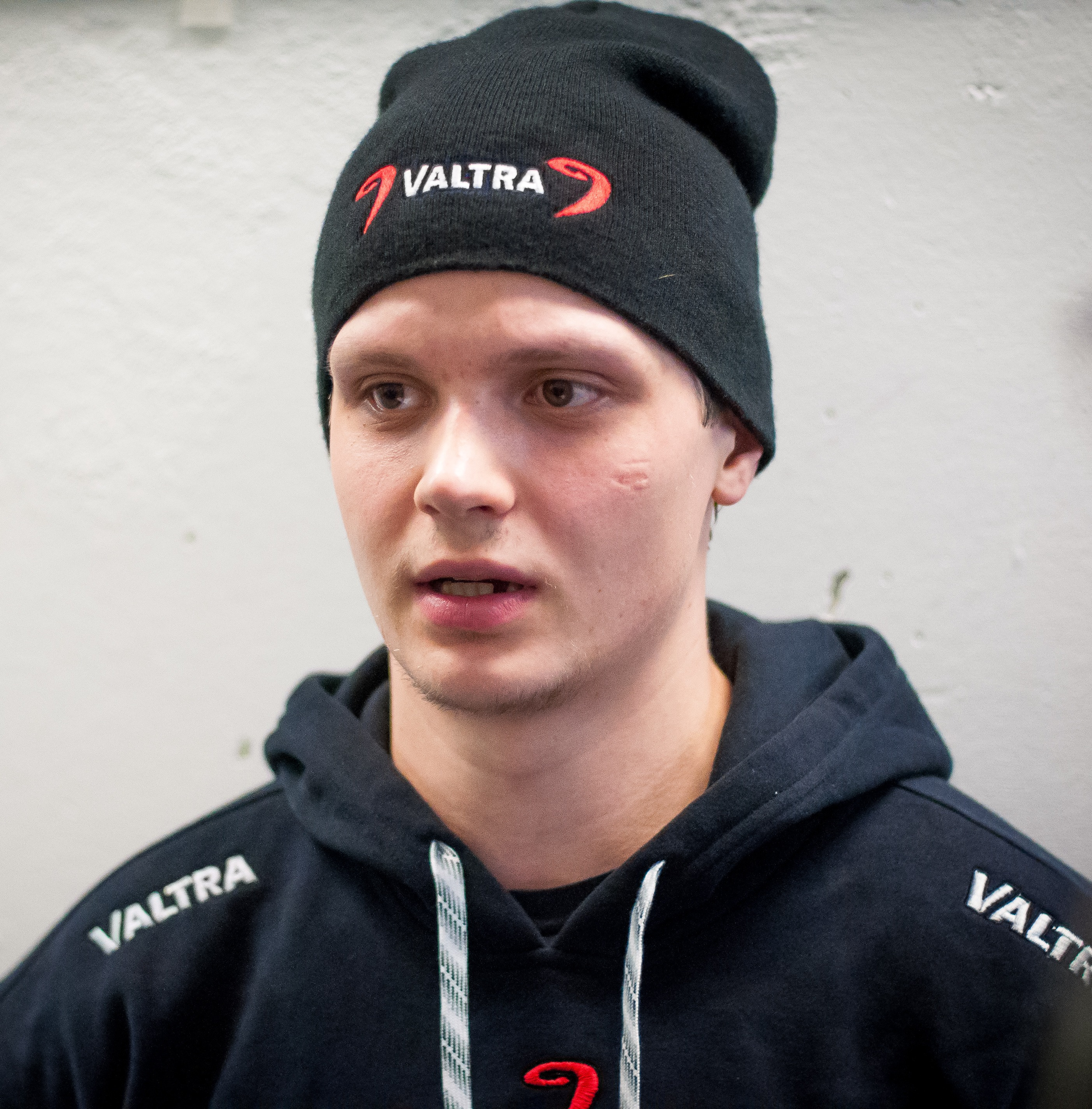
- Born: 18 November 1990 (age 35) Helsinki, Finland
- Height: 6 ft 0 in (183 cm)
- Weight: 198 lb (90 kg; 14 st 2 lb)
- Position: Defence
- Shoots: Left
- SHL team Former teams: Timrå IK; Espoo Blues; JYP; Luleå HF; Milwaukee Admirals; Linköpings HC; Örebro HK; HC Davos
- NHL draft: Undrafted
- Playing career: 2008–present

Kristian Näkyvä (born 18 November 1990) is a Finnish professional ice hockey defenceman who currently plays for Timrå IK of the Swedish Hockey League (SHL).

== Playing career ==
Undrafted, Näkyvä played as a youth within the Espoo Blues organization. He made his professional debut in the 2008–09 with the Blues with 2 assists in 6 games. After three seasons with the Blues, Näkyvä signed with rivals JYP on 18 May 2011 in search of regular playing time at the Liiga level.

Näkyvä established himself within the blueline of JYP, and after three seasons in which he won a Championship in 2012 and found a place in the international squad, he opted to leave his native Finland and signed a three-year contract with Luleå HF of the Swedish Hockey League on 9 June 2014. In his debut season in Sweden in the 2014–15 season, Näkyvä was an instant success in co-leading the league in goals from the blueline with 10 and finishing 5th in scoring with 29 points.

Näkyvä's performances gained NHL interest, and after just one season with Luleå, he cut short his contract with the club to sign a one-year entry-level contract with the Nashville Predators on 24 April 2015. In the 2015–16 season, Näkyvä was assigned to Nashville's American Hockey League affiliate, the Milwaukee Admirals. Unable to earn a recall to the Predators, Näkyvä appeared in 69 games for 10 points.

On 18 May 2016, Näkyvä opted to leave the Predators organization after one season to return to Sweden, signing a two-year contract with Linköping HC of the SHL.

== Career statistics ==
=== Regular season and playoffs ===
			Regular season					Playoffs
Season	Team	League	GP	G	A	Pts	PIM	GP	G	A	Pts	PIM
2008–09	Espoo Blues	SM-l	6	0	2	2	2	—	—	—	—	—
2009–10	Espoo Blues	SM-l	7	0	0	0	4	—	—	—	—	—
2009–10	TuTo	Mestis	5	0	0	0	0	—	—	—	—	—
2010–11	Espoo Blues	SM-l	16	0	1	1	8	—	—	—	—	—
2010–11	Jukurit	Mestis	16	0	7	7	8	—	—	—	—	—
2010–11	Kiekko-Vantaa	Mestis	5	0	2	2	6	—	—	—	—	—
2011–12	JYP	SM-l	55	7	16	23	20	13	0	5	5	4
2011–12	JYP-Akatemia	Mestis	2	2	1	3	2	—	—	—	—	—
2012–13	JYP	SM-l	59	6	22	28	52	11	1	3	4	6
2013–14	JYP	Liiga	57	7	19	26	40	6	1	2	3	2
2014–15	Luleå HF	SHL	55	10	19	29	42	9	1	3	4	6
2015–16	Milwaukee Admirals	AHL	69	1	9	10	32	3	0	0	0	2
2016–17	Linköpings HC	SHL	50	8	15	23	38	6	0	1	1	2
2017–18	Linköpings HC	SHL	52	2	24	26	32	7	4	1	5	6
2018–19	Örebro HK	SHL	51	6	21	27	38	2	0	0	0	0
2019–20	Örebro HK	SHL	39	8	12	20	34	—	—	—	—	—
2020–21	Örebro HK	SHL	39	3	13	16	49	9	2	1	3	4
2021–22	Örebro HK	SHL	36	6	12	18	18	8	0	2	2	6
2022–23	Örebro HK	SHL	52	7	29	36	53	13	1	5	6	6
2023–24	HC Davos	NL	49	6	22	28	18	2	1	0	1	25
Liiga totals			200	20	60	80	126	30	2	10	12	12
SHL totals			374	50	145	195	304	54	8	13	21	30

=== International ===
Year	Team	Event	Result	GP	G	A	Pts	PIM
2010	Finland	WJC	5th	6	0	1	1	2
Junior totals				6	0	1	1	2
