= Olli Sipiläinen =

Finnish ice hockey player

- Born: 27 April 1977 (age 48); Lappeenranta, Finland
- Height: 5 ft 10 in (178 cm)
- Weight: 190 lb (86 kg; 13 st 8 lb)
- Position: Left wing
- Shoots: Left
- Liiga team Former teams: Jukurit; SaiPa; JYP Jyväskylä; Lukko
- NHL draft: Undrafted
- Playing career: 1995–present

Olli Sipiläinen (born 24 July 1977) is a Finnish ice hockey player currently playing for Jukurit of the Finnish Liiga. Between 2002 and 2006 he played for Mikkelin Jukurit.

== Career statistics ==
			Regular season					Playoffs
Season	Team	League	GP	G	A	Pts	PIM	GP	G	A	Pts	PIM
1995–96	Imatran Ketterä	I-Divisioona	33	2	4	6	6	—	—	—	—	—
1996–97	Imatran Ketterä U20	U20 I-Divisioona	34	17	28	45	50	—	—	—	—	—
1996–97	Imatran Ketterä	I-Divisioona	2	0	0	0	4	—	—	—	—	—
1997–98	Imatran Ketterä U20	U20 I-Divisioona	9	6	9	15	45	—	—	—	—	—
1997–98	Imatran Ketterä	2. Divisioona	33	23	16	39	14	—	—	—	—	—
1998–99	Imatran Ketterä	III-divisioona	—	—	—	—	—	—	—	—	—	—
1999–00	Imatran Ketterä	2. Divisioona	36	31	31	62	16	—	—	—	—	—
2000–01	SaiPa	SM-liiga	51	3	6	9	26	—	—	—	—	—
2001–02	SaiPa	SM-liiga	50	0	0	0	6	—	—	—	—	—
2002–03	Jukurit	Mestis	43	13	13	26	14	11	3	3	6	0
2003–04	Jukurit	Mestis	45	16	11	27	14	13	3	0	3	4
2004–05	Jukurit	Mestis	36	12	11	23	20	9	4	3	7	2
2005–06	Jukurit	Mestis	45	15	14	29	34	13	2	0	2	16
2006–07	JYP Jyväskylä	SM-liiga	55	5	6	11	20	—	—	—	—	—
2007–08	JYP Jyväskylä	SM-liiga	50	2	8	10	36	6	0	1	1	0
2008–09	JYP Jyväskylä	SM-liiga	50	0	4	4	43	15	2	2	4	12
2009–10	JYP Jyväskylä	SM-liiga	45	5	9	14	18	14	2	1	3	0
2009–10	D Team	Mestis	1	0	1	1	2	—	—	—	—	—
2010–11	JYP Jyväskylä	SM-liiga	58	6	7	13	86	10	0	2	2	2
2011–12	JYP Jyväskylä	SM-liiga	49	3	5	8	18	14	1	0	1	35
2011–12	JYP Akatemia	Mestis	2	0	1	1	0	—	—	—	—	—
2012–13	JYP Jyväskylä	SM-liiga	55	11	4	15	43	6	1	3	4	2
2013–14	Lukko	Liiga	59	8	5	13	42	15	1	0	1	6
2014–15	Lukko	Liiga	59	7	7	14	16	14	0	1	1	4
2015–16	Lukko	Liiga	59	3	5	8	22	5	0	1	1	0
2016–17	Lukko	Liiga	46	2	2	4	43	—	—	—	—	—
Liiga totals			686	55	68	123	419	99	7	11	18	61
Mestis totals			172	56	51	107	84	46	12	6	18	22
