= 2013 SM-liiga playoffs =

Tournament details
- Dates: 14 March – 24 April 2013
- Teams: 10
- Defending champions: JYP Jyväskylä

Final positions
- Champions: HC Ässät Pori
- Runner-up: Tappara
- Third place: JYP Jyväskylä

The 2013 SM-liiga playoffs was the playoff tournament of the SM-liiga for the 2012–13 season. They began on March 14, 2013, following the conclusion of the regular season. The playoffs ended on April 24, 2013, with the HC Ässät Pori defeating Tappara in the finals in six games to win the Kanada-malja. Antti Raanta won the Jari Kurri Trophy as the playoffs MVP.

== Playoff bracket ==
The wild card round was competed between teams placed 10–7 in the regular season. The winner of the wild card round was paired with the two top teams of the regular season. The wild card round was played as a besto-of-three series and the rest were best-of-seven excluding the bronze medal game.

Wild-card round (best-of-3)
7	Kärpät	1
10	Lukko	2
8	HIFK	2
9	SaiPa	1

Quarter-finals (best-of-7)
1	Jokerit	2
10	Lukko	4
2	Tappara	4
8	HIFK	1
3	JYP	4
6	HPK	1
4	Ässät	4
5	KalPa	1

Semi-finals (best-of-7)
2	Tappara	4
10	Lukko	0
(Pairings are re-seeded after the first and second round)
3	JYP	1
4	Ässät	4

Finals (best-of-7)
4	Ässät	4
2	Tappara	2
Bronze medal game
3	JYP	1
10	Lukko	0

=== Relegation ===
The last placed team Ilves played the Mestis champions Jukurit in a best-of-seven series. Ilves beat Jukurit 4–1 to keep their spot in the Liiga for the next season.

== Finals ==
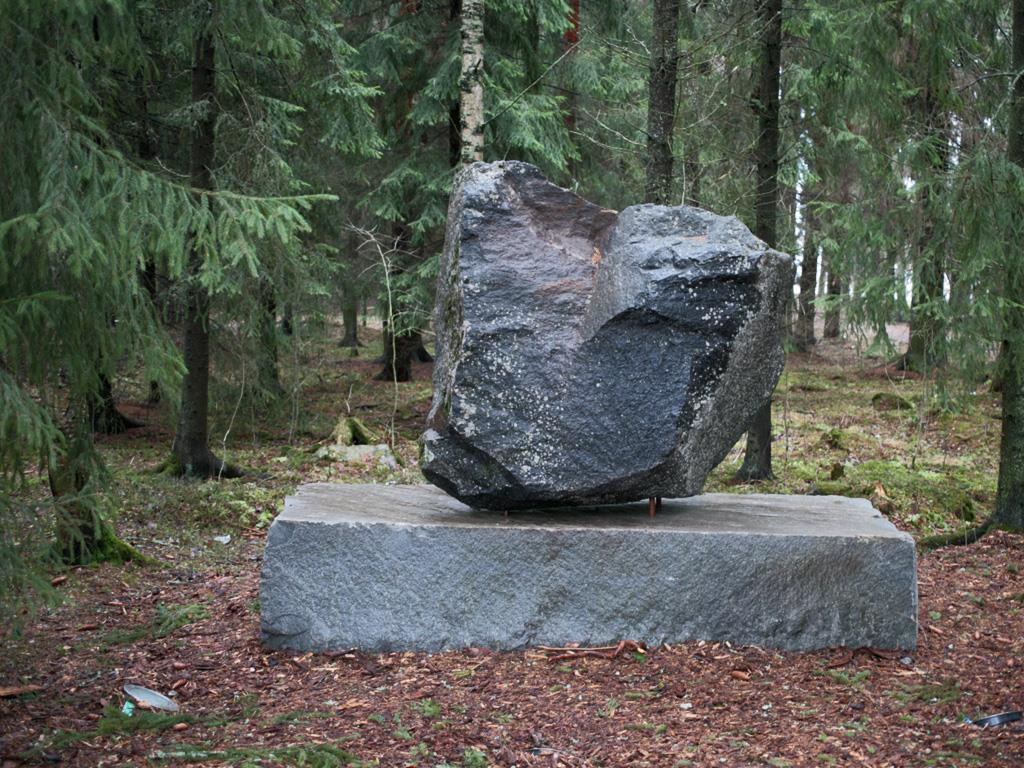
The Stone of Victory outside Ässät's arena honoring the players of the 2013 championship winning team.

Ässät and Tappara were the finalists. After the first four matches, the series was even 2–2. Tappara narrowly won the opening match in Tampere 2–1 after scoring the winning goal just five seconds before the end of the last period. In the second match, Ässät defeated Tappara at home with clear numbers 5–1. The third match in Tampere was close again, as Tappara equalized with a dominant force in the 53rd minute and scored the winning goal just one second before the end of the match. Tappara won the match 3–2. In the fourth game,2012–13 SM-liiga season Ässät defeated Tappara again with four goals, winning 4–0 at home. The culmination of the series was the fifth match in Tampere. After Tappara's Jarno Koskiranta scored the opening goal at the beginning of the second period, Ässät's Eero Elo tied the match during the same period. In a 1-1 tie, the game went to overtime. Only in the third overtime, at 108:59, Ässät's Veli-Matti Savinainen scored the winning goal of the match and thus Ässät took the first match ball. Tappara still had a chance to take the series to the seventh match by winning the sixth match in Pori. Ässät won the match with goals 3–2 and thus achieved the Finnish championship with 2–4 wins. The championship was Ässät's 3rd Finnish Championship title and the first one since 1978.

Tappara-Ässät 2-1
Ässät-Tappara 5-1
Tappara-Ässät 3-2
Ässät-Tappara 4-0
Tappara-Ässät 1-2 (OT)
Ässät-Tappara 3-2

== See also ==
- 2012–13 SM-liiga season
