= Johan Larsson (ice hockey, born 1986) =

Swedish ice hockey player

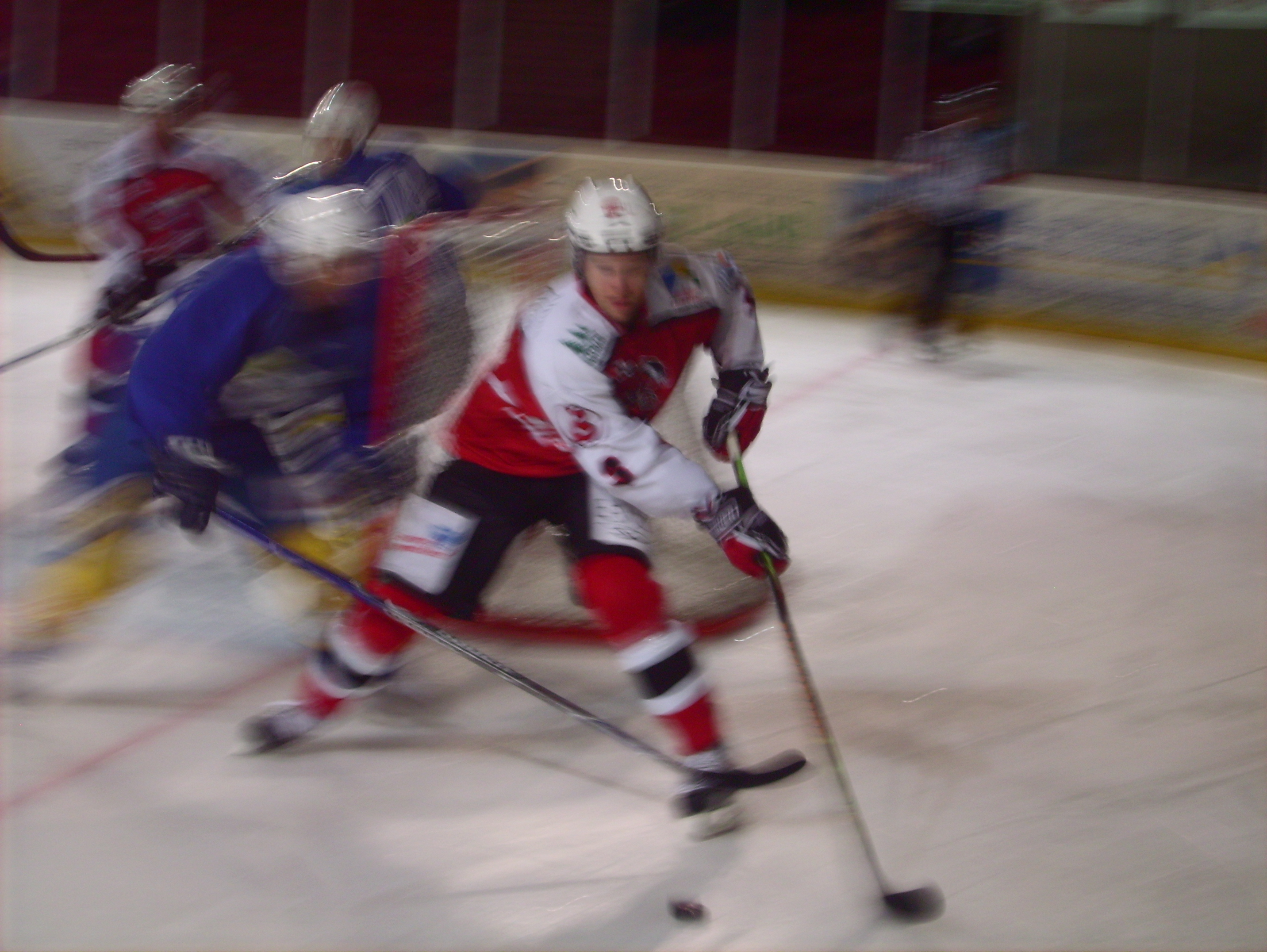
- Johan Larsson playing for the Diables Rouges de Briançon, September 2008
- Born: March 24, 1986 (age 40) Lindesberg, Sweden
- Height: 6 ft 1 in (185 cm)
- Weight: 198 lb (90 kg; 14 st 2 lb)
- Position: Defenceman
- Shoots: Right
- Allsv team Former teams: BIK Karlskoga; Diables Rouges de Briançon; Färjestads BK; HPK; HV71; Tappara; SaiPa; Iserlohn Roosters; AIK
- Playing career: 2005–present

Johan Larsson (born March 24, 1986) is a Swedish professional ice hockey defenceman who is currently playing with BIK Karlskoga in the HockeyAllsvenskan (Allsv).

== Playing career ==
Larsson began his career in 2005 with Bofors IK in the HockeyAllsvenskan. He played for Diables Rouges de Briançon in the Ligue Magnus in the 2008–09 season. In the 2010–11 HockeyAllsvenskan season, he scored 14 goals with Bofors, the best total of the season for a defenceman. In April 2011, he signed a two-year contract with reigning Swedish champions Färjestads BK of the Elitserien. Following stops included HV71 as well as Finnish clubs HPK, Tappara and SaiPa.

In October 2016, he was picked up by the Iserlohn Roosters of the Deutsche Eishockey Liga (DEL) in Germany. Larsson played two seasons in the DEL with the Roosters, before returning to Sweden as a free agent in signing a one-year contract with AIK IF of the Allsvenskan on July 10, 2018.

== Career statistics ==
			Regular season					Playoffs
Season	Team	League	GP	G	A	Pts	PIM	GP	G	A	Pts	PIM
2004–05	Bofors IK	Allsv	5	0	0	0	0	5	0	0	0	0
2004–05	Bofors IK	J20 Div.1	11	2	2	4	8	—	—	—	—	—
2004–05	Karlskoga HC	Div.2	19	6	8	14	12	—	—	—	—	—
2005–06	Bofors IK	Allsv	17	0	0	0	0	—	—	—	—	—
2005–06	Karlskoga HC	Div.2	32	10	13	23	30	6	0	7	7	6
2006–07	Bofors IK	Allsv	40	2	6	8	12	—	—	—	—	—
2006–07	Lindlövens IF	Div.1	6	1	2	3	18	—	—	—	—	—
2007–08	Bofors IK	Allsv	45	8	11	19	71	—	—	—	—	—
2008–09	Diables Rouges de Briançon	FRA	25	2	4	6	26	12	0	4	4	8
2009–10	Bofors IK	Allsv	52	6	14	20	38	2	0	0	0	0
2010–11	Bofors IK	Allsv	49	14	14	28	38	—	—	—	—	—
2011–12	Färjestads BK	J20	10	1	2	3	12	—	—	—	—	—
2011–12	Färjestads BK	SEL	31	2	1	3	12	0	0	0	0	0
2012–13	Färjestads BK	J20	1	0	0	0	0	—	—	—	—	—
2012–13	VIK Västerås HK	Allsv	8	1	1	2	10	—	—	—	—	—
2012–13	HPK	SM-l	45	9	14	23	34	5	0	0	0	8
2013–14	HV71	SHL	17	0	1	1	6	—	—	—	—	—
2013–14	Tappara	Liiga	28	0	2	2	33	14	0	1	1	8
2013–14	LeKi	Mestis	1	0	1	1	0	—	—	—	—	—
2014–15	SaiPa	Liiga	32	6	6	12	16	6	2	2	4	2
2015–16	SaiPa	Liiga	58	3	11	14	34	6	0	0	0	25
2016–17	Iserlohn Roosters	DEL	44	0	12	12	26	—	—	—	—	—
2017–18	Iserlohn Roosters	DEL	52	4	8	12	28	2	0	1	1	2
2018–19	AIK IF	Allsv	40	9	11	20	14	7	0	1	1	2
SHL totals			48	2	2	4	18	—	—	—	—	—
Liiga totals			163	18	33	51	117	31	2	3	5	43
