= Robert Leino =

Finnish ice hockey player

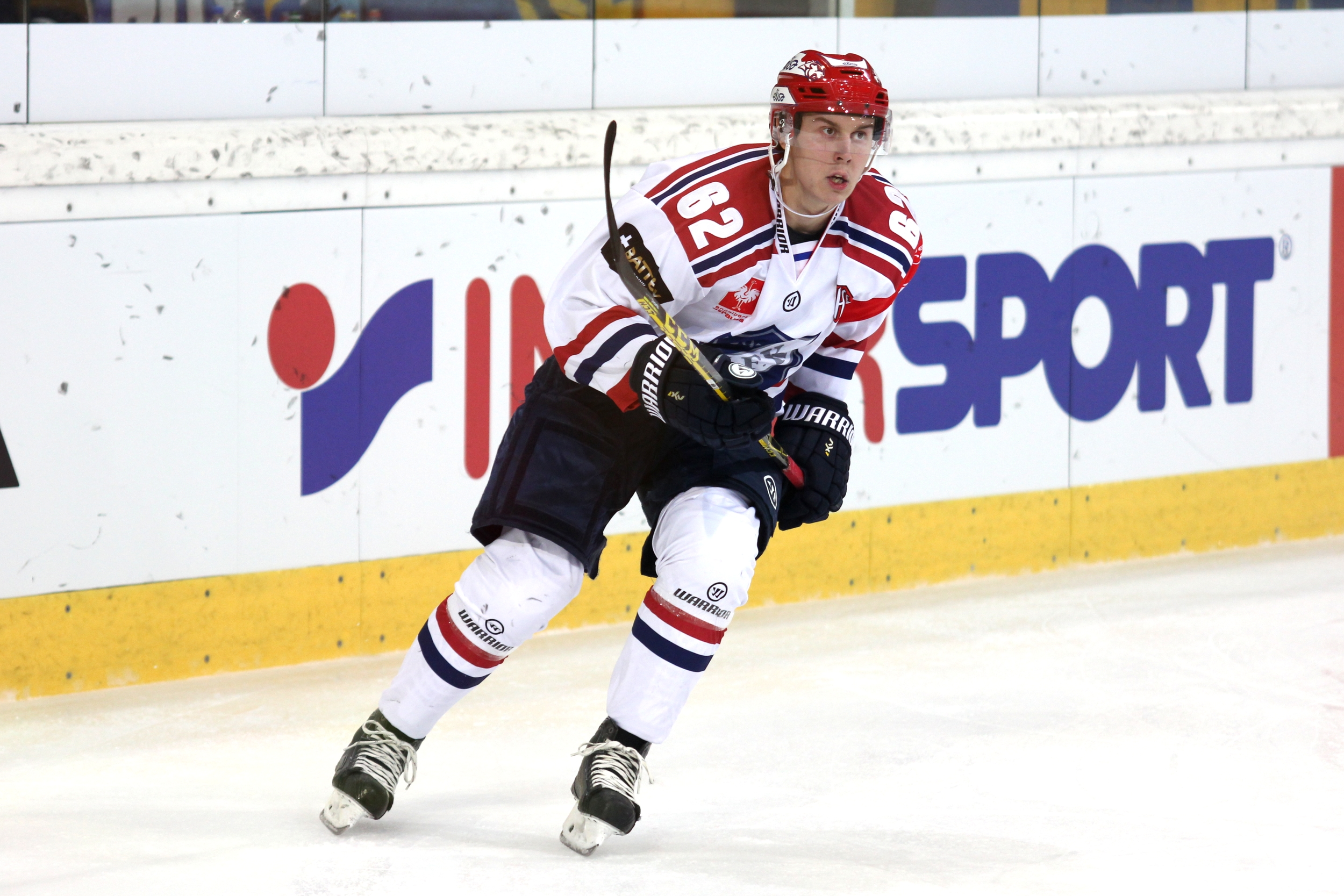
- Born: April 14, 1993 (age 33) Hämeenlinna, Finland
- Height: 6 ft 0 in (183 cm)
- Weight: 183 lb (83 kg; 13 st 1 lb)
- Position: Forward
- Shoots: Right
- NL team Former teams: EHC Kloten; HPK; HIFK; Ilves; Örebro HK
- Playing career: 2012–present

Robert Leino (born April 14, 1993) is a Finnish professional ice hockey player. He is currently playing with EHC Kloten of the National League (NL).

== Playing career ==
Leino made his Liiga debut playing with HPK during the 2012–13 Liiga season and has also played for HIFK and Ilves.

Following his eighth season in the Liiga in 2019–20, Leino left Finland as a free agent and agreed to a three-year contract with Örebro HK of the Swedish Hockey League (SHL) on 11 May 2020.

Leino established himself amongst Örebro HK top offensive players in SHL history through his five-year tenure with the club, before leaving as a free agent to sign a one-year contract with Swiss club, EHC Kloten of the NL, on 3 June 2025.
