= Erik Hanses =

Swedish ice hockey player

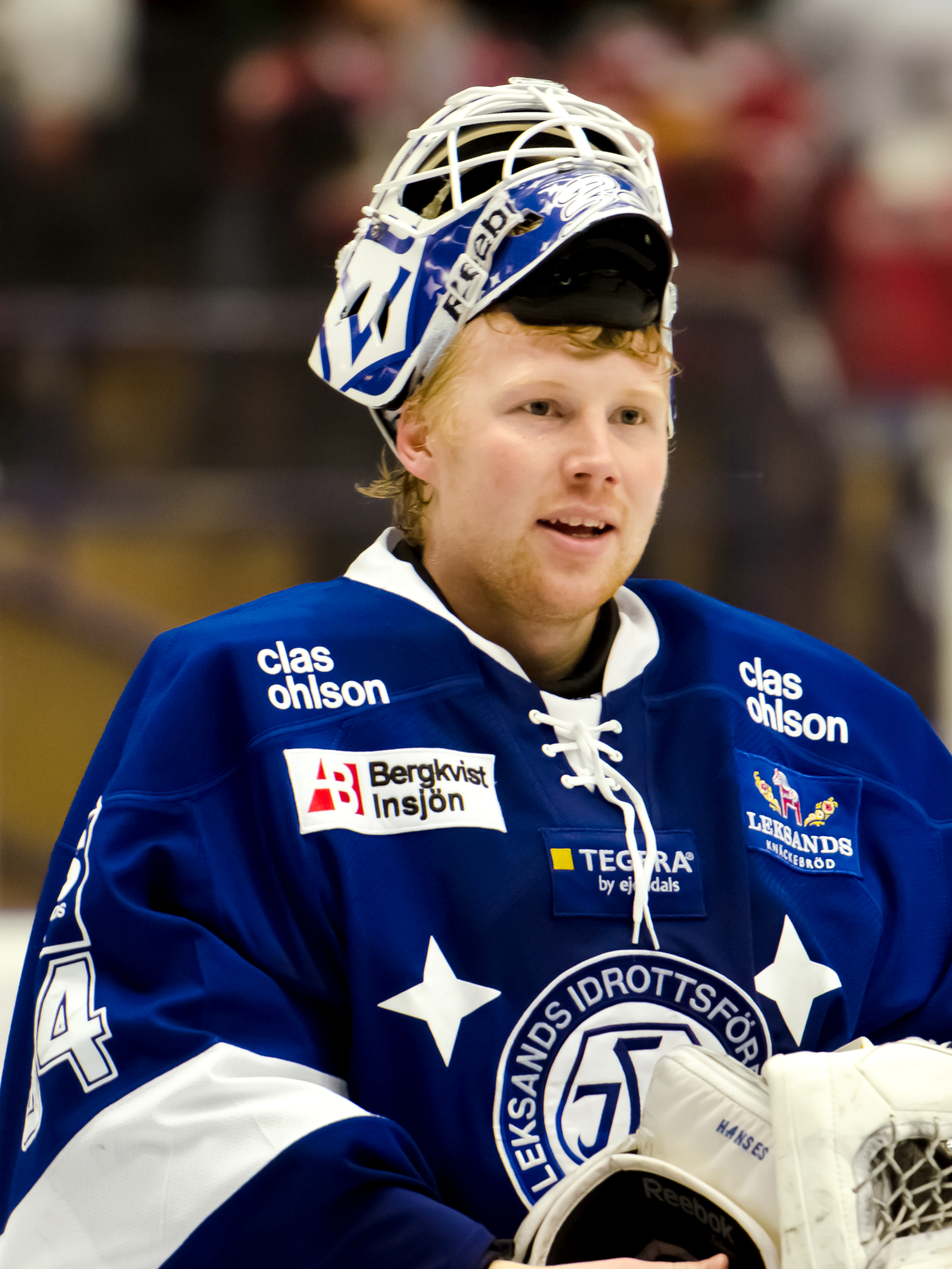
- Born: June 1, 1990 (age 35) Leksand, Sweden
- Height: 6 ft 0 in (183 cm)
- Weight: 185 lb (84 kg; 13 st 3 lb)
- Position: Goaltender
- Shoots: Left
- Allsv team Former teams: Modo Hockey; Skellefteå AIK
- NHL draft: Undrafted
- Playing career: 2008–present

Erik Hanses (born June 1, 1990) is a Swedish professional ice hockey goaltender who plays with Modo Hockey of the HockeyAllsvenskan.

Following six seasons with Leksands IF, Hanses signed with Almtuna IS. On February 26, 2014, Hanses was transferred to Skellefteå AIK of the Swedish Hockey League (SHL).
