= Max Görtz =

Swedish professional ice hockey forward (born 1993)

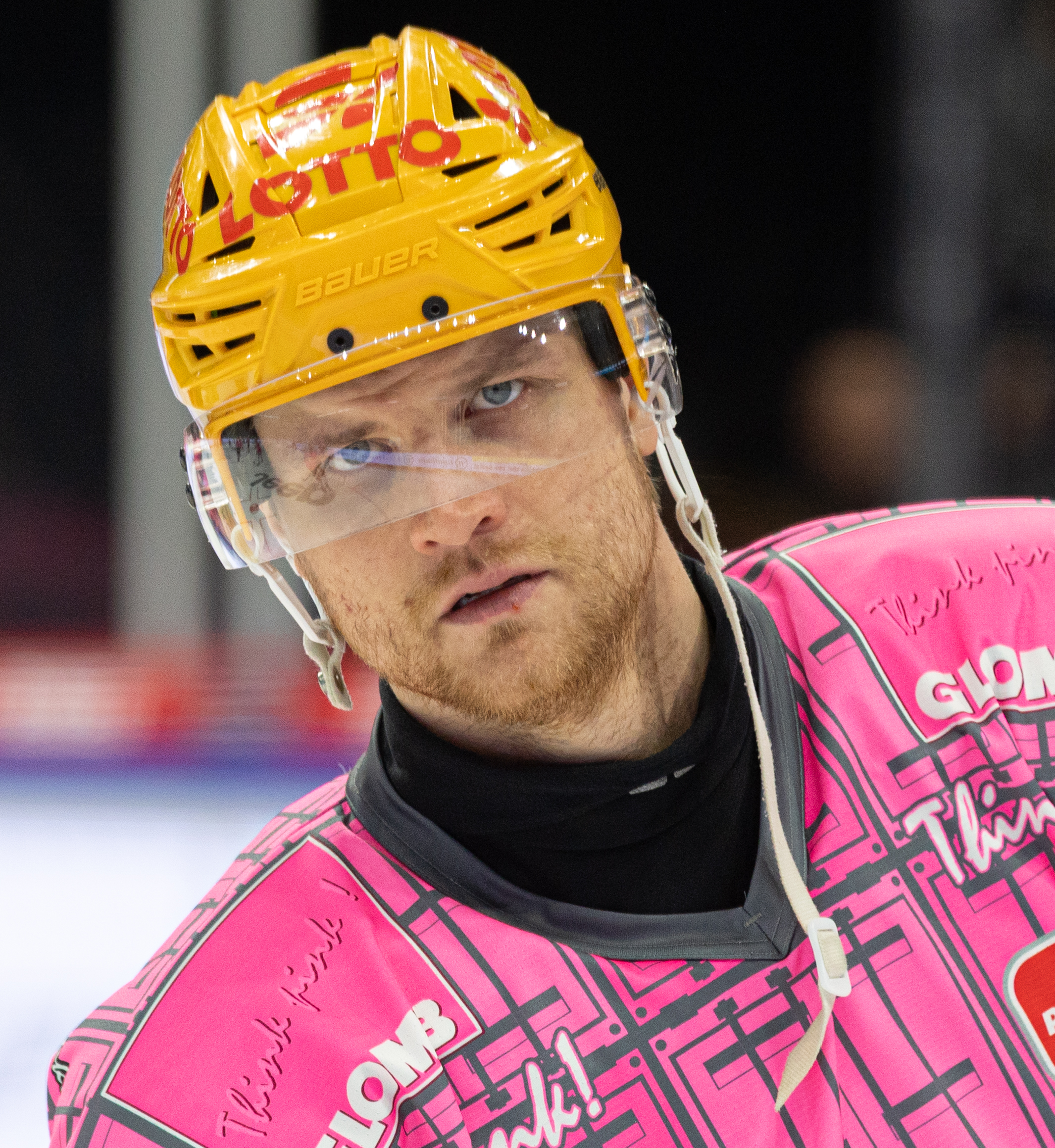
- Görtz playing for Fischtown Pinguins in 2025
- Born: January 28, 1993 (age 33) Höör, Sweden
- Height: 6 ft 2 in (188 cm)
- Weight: 196 lb (89 kg; 14 st 0 lb)
- Position: Right wing
- Shoots: Right
- DEL team Former teams: Fischtown Pinguins; Färjestad BK; Frölunda HC; Milwaukee Admirals; San Diego Gulls; Malmö Redhawks; Grizzlys Wolfsburg; Schwenninger Wild Wings; KalPa
- NHL draft: 172nd overall, 2012; Nashville Predators
- Playing career: 2011–present

Max Görtz (born January 28, 1993) is a Swedish professional ice hockey forward. He is currently playing with Fischtown Pinguins in the Deutsche Eishockey Liga (DEL). Görtz was selected by the Nashville Predators in the 6th round (172nd overall) of the 2012 NHL entry draft.

== Playing career ==
Görtz originally played as a youth within the Malmö Redhawks organization at the J20 SuperElit level. He later made his professional debut, appearing in the Swedish Hockey League with Färjestad BK and Frölunda HC. On June 2, 2014, he signed a three-year entry-level contract with Nashville.

After a successful rookie season in North America, scoring 47 points in 72 games with the Predators AHL affiliate, the Milwaukee Admirals, Görtz was unable to consolidate his performance in repeating his offensive contribution the following 2016–17 season. After 30 games, having registered just 1 goal and 4 points, Görtz was traded by the Predators to the Anaheim Ducks in exchange for Andrew O'Brien on January 19, 2017.

Having failed to make his debut at the NHL level throughout his rookie contract, as an impending restricted free agent, Görtz opted to return to his original club in Sweden, the Malmö Redhawks of the SHL, in signing a two-year contract on May 26, 2017.

After his contract with the Redhawks, Görtz left Sweden to sign a one-year contract with German club Grizzlys Wolfsburg of the Deutsche Eishockey Liga (DEL), on 7 August 2020.

Having completed a second season in the DEL with Schwenninger Wild Wings, Görtz left Germany and was signed as a free agent to a two-year contract with Finnish club KalPa of the Liiga, on 11 June 2022.

== Career statistics ==
=== Regular season and playoffs ===
			Regular season					Playoffs
Season	Team	League	GP	G	A	Pts	PIM	GP	G	A	Pts	PIM
2009–10	Malmö Redhawks	J20	26	1	3	4	6	—	—	—	—	—
2010–11	Malmö Redhawks	J20	40	9	9	18	14	5	2	0	2	2
2011–12	Färjestads BK	J20	28	17	18	35	6	6	4	3	7	0
2011–12	Färjestads BK	SEL	18	2	3	5	0	2	0	0	0	2
2012–13	Färjestads BK	J20	8	7	1	8	0	4	2	3	5	0
2012–13	Färjestads BK	SEL	50	9	6	15	4	9	0	2	2	0
2013–14	Färjestads BK	J20	4	2	3	5	2	—	—	—	—	—
2013–14	Färjestads BK	SHL	22	2	2	4	2	—	—	—	—	—
2013–14	Frölunda HC	SHL	18	6	0	6	2	7	3	2	5	0
2014–15	Frölunda HC	SHL	53	14	14	28	6	12	3	1	4	0
2015–16	Milwaukee Admirals	AHL	72	18	29	47	18	3	0	1	1	0
2015–16	Cincinnati Cyclones	ECHL	1	0	0	0	0	—	—	—	—	—
2016–17	Milwaukee Admirals	AHL	30	1	3	4	2	—	—	—	—	—
2016–17	San Diego Gulls	AHL	28	4	15	19	21	8	0	2	2	0
2017–18	Malmö Redhawks	SHL	38	9	11	20	4	8	0	1	1	0
2018–19	Malmö Redhawks	SHL	43	10	12	22	4	5	0	0	0	2
2019–20	Malmö Redhawks	SHL	37	9	6	15	8	—	—	—	—	—
2020–21	Grizzlys Wolfsburg	DEL	38	10	18	28	8	9	2	1	3	0
2021–22	Schwenninger Wild Wings	DEL	50	18	19	37	12	—	—	—	—	—
2022–23	KalPa	Liiga	47	11	16	27	6	7	3	2	5	2
2023–24	Schwenninger Wild Wings	DEL	42	4	15	19	20	—	—	—	—	—
2024–25	Fischtown Pinguins	DEL	52	12	20	32	10	6	2	1	3	4
SHL totals			279	61	54	115	30	43	6	6	12	4

=== International ===
Year	Team	Event	Result	GP	G	A	Pts	PIM
2010	Sweden	U17	3rd place, bronze medalist(s)	6	1	0	1	0
Junior totals				6	1	0	1	0
