= Juha-Pekka Haataja =

Finnish ice hockey player

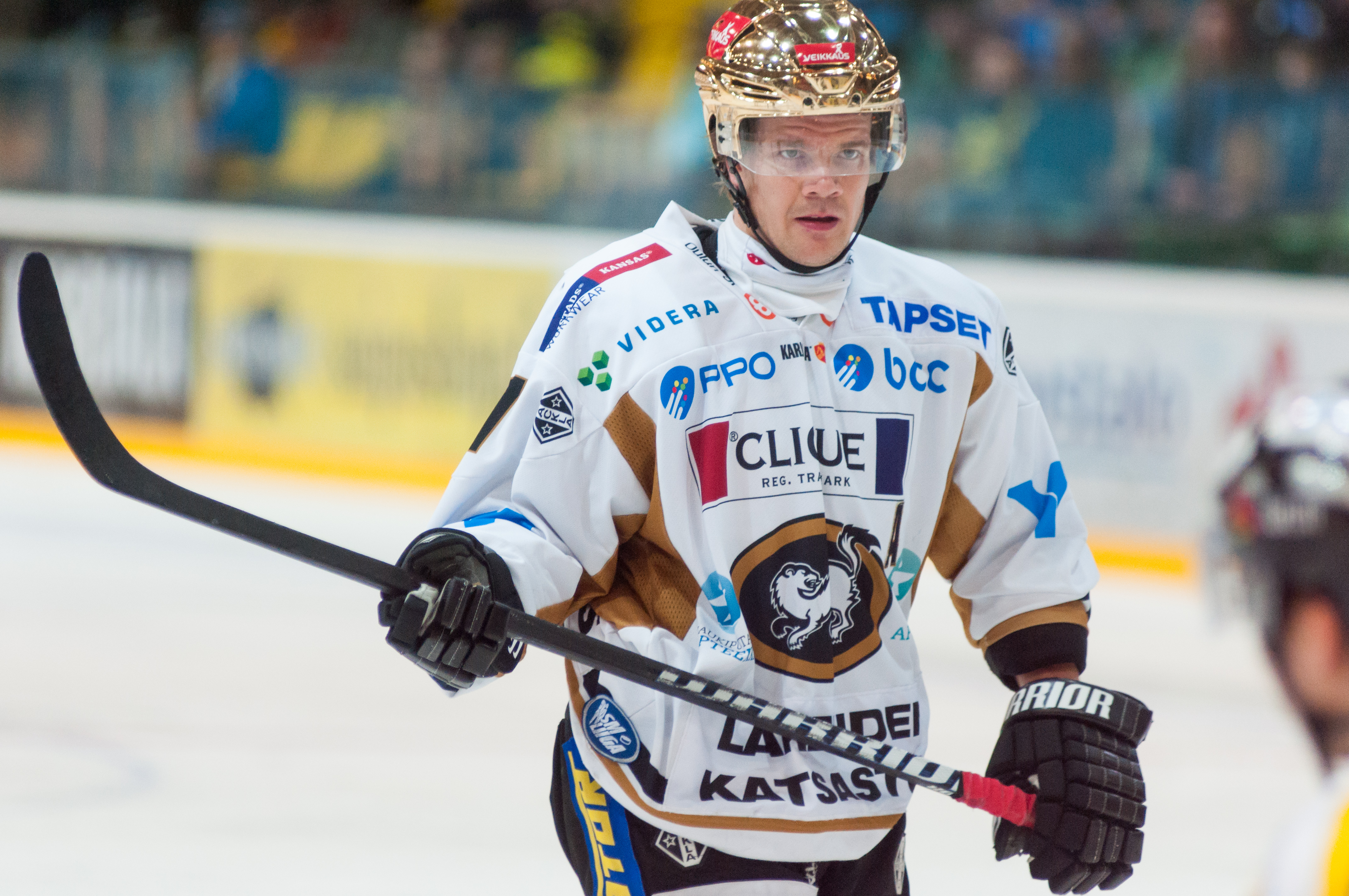
- Born: October 31, 1982 (age 42); Oulu, Finland
- Height: 5 ft 10 in (178 cm)
- Weight: 185 lb (84 kg; 13 st 3 lb)
- Position: Right Wing
- Shot: Right
- Liiga team Former teams: KooKoo; Oulun Kärpät; Lukko; HIFK; Atlant Moscow Oblast; Modo Hockey
- National team: Finland
- Playing career: 2001–2020

Juha-Pekka Haataja (born October 31, 1982) is a Finnish professional ice hockey winger. He currently plays for KooKoo of the Finnish Liiga.

== Playing career ==
In the 2012–13 season, he had the most points in the SM-Liiga at 59 while playing for Oulun Kärpät. Haataja spent parts of two seasons with Modo Hockey in the Swedish Hockey League before returning to the Liiga, signing a deal with KooKoo on October 12, 2015. In the 2019–20 season, on November 20, 2019, Haataja scored the 95th power-play goal of her league career, with which he became the player with the highest number of power-play goals in the regular season in the Finnish Liiga, overtaking Janne Ojanen.

== Awards, honors and records ==
Awards	Year
Liiga
Finnish Champion (Kanada-malja)	2003-04, 2004-05, 2010-11
Runners-up	2002-03
Bronze Medal	2005-06, 2017-18
Aarne Honkavaara award	2012-13
Veli-Pekka Ketola award	2012-13

== Career statistics ==
=== Regular season and playoffs ===
			Regular season					Playoffs
Season	Team	League	GP	G	A	Pts	PIM	GP	G	A	Pts	PIM
1999–2000	Kärpät	FIN U18	34	20	12	32	82	6	3	5	8	0
1999–2000	Kärpät	FIN U20	1	0	1	1	0	—	—	—	—	—
2000–01	Kärpät	FIN U20	40	28	19	47	41	6	0	0	0	0
2001–02	Kärpät	FIN U20	41	16	20	36	16	2	0	0	0	0
2001–02	Kärpät	SM-l	15	4	0	4	2	4	0	0	0	0
2002–03	Kärpät	SM-l	56	4	6	10	4	11	0	2	2	4
2003–04	Kärpät	SM-l	44	3	4	7	10	15	2	0	2	6
2004–05	Kärpät	SM-l	48	6	15	21	10	9	0	1	1	2
2005–06	Kärpät	SM-l	55	9	16	25	24	11	3	2	5	4
2006–07	Lukko	SM-l	56	27	32	59	52	3	0	0	0	2
2007–08	Lukko	SM-l	33	10	17	27	8	—	—	—	—	—
2008–09	Lukko	SM-l	58	24	26	50	26	—	—	—	—	—
2009–10	HIFK	SM-l	46	16	21	37	14	6	4	2	6	4
2010–11	HIFK	SM-l	52	16	22	38	26	14	8	8	16	4
2011–12	Kärpät	SM-l	55	24	16	40	16	9	4	2	6	0
2012–13	Kärpät	SM-l	60	28	31	59	69	3	0	1	1	2
2013–14	Atlant Moscow Oblast	KHL	42	5	9	14	10	—	—	—	—	—
2014–15	Kärpät	Liiga	32	7	11	18	24	—	—	—	—	—
2014–15	Modo Hockey	SHL	16	2	5	7	6	—	—	—	—	—
2015–16	Modo Hockey	SHL	4	1	0	1	0	—	—	—	—	—
2015–16	KooKoo	Liiga	49	14	19	33	8	—	—	—	—	—
2016–17	KooKoo	Liiga	60	20	21	41	42	—	—	—	—	—
2017–18	HIFK	Liiga	49	13	15	28	26	14	4	6	10	2
2018–19	KooKoo	Liiga	54	14	21	35	45	—	—	—	—	—
2019–20	KooKoo	Liiga	59	17	33	50	16	—	—	—	—	—
SM-l/Liiga totals			881	256	326	582	422	99	25	24	49	30

=== International ===
Year	Team	Event	GP	G	A	Pts	PIM
2013	Finland	WC	6	0	0	0	2
