= Ville Vahalahti =

Finnish ice hockey player

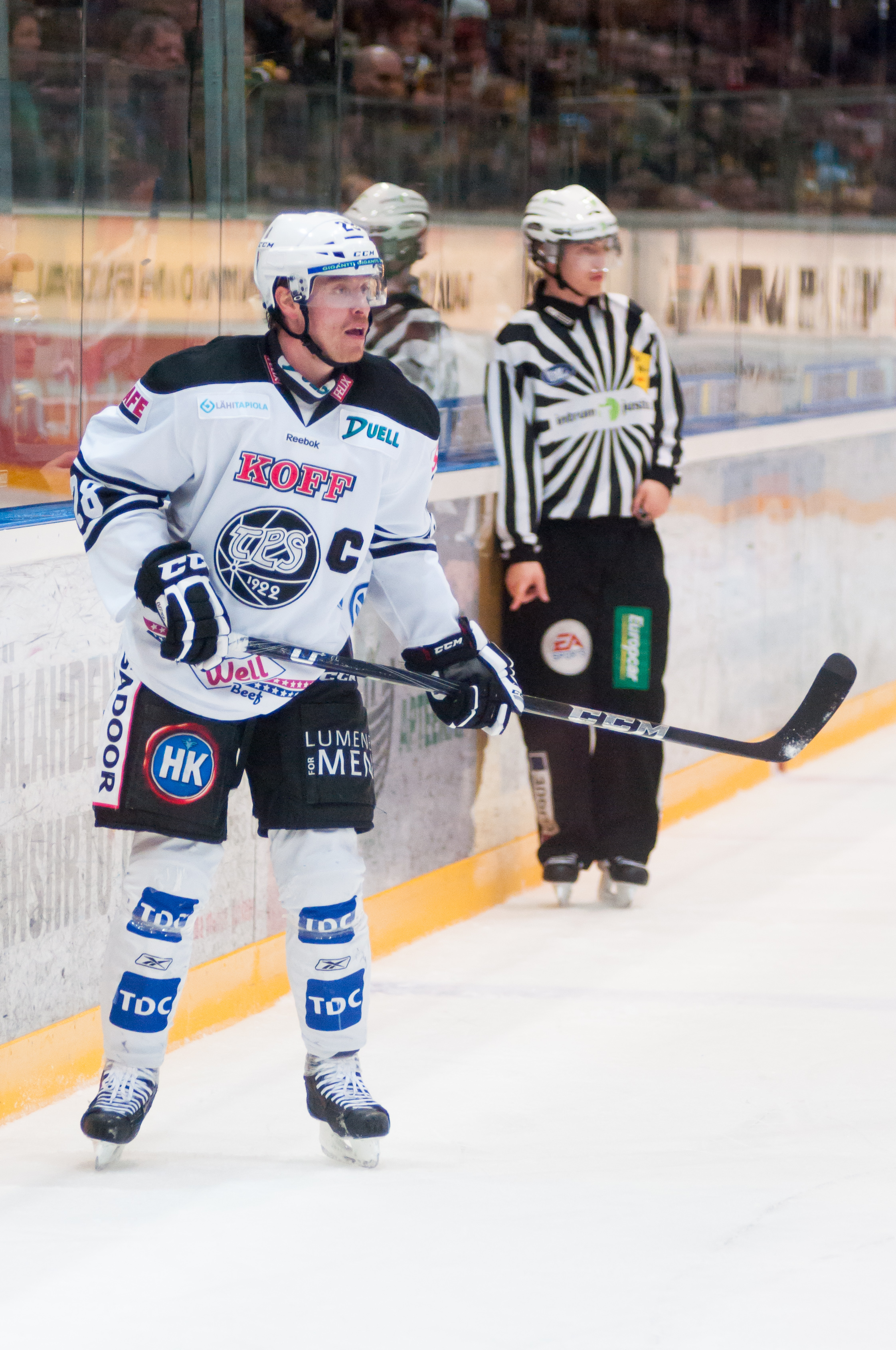
- Ville Vahalahti (2012)
- Born: 7 November 1977 (age 47); Pargas, Finland
- Height: 6 ft 0 in (183 cm)
- Weight: 192 lb (87 kg; 13 st 10 lb)
- Position: Forward
- Shoots: Left
- Liiga team Former teams: Lukko; TPS; Linköpings HC
- National team: Finland
- Playing career: 1995–present

Ville Vahalahti (born 7 November 1977 in Pargas, Finland) is a Finnish ice hockey player currently playing for Lukko of the Finnish Liiga.

== Playing career ==
Vahalahti started his professional career in the second highest division of hockey in Finland. There he played for the team Kiekko-67 Turku. After two seasons, he advanced to the SM-liiga team TPS.

He spent the 2007–08 season with Linköpings HC of the Swedish Elitserien, but upon completion of the year returned to TPS signing a two-year contract. After a strong return with TPS, Vahalahti was named to represent Finland at the 2009 Men's World Ice Hockey Championships in Switzerland.

During the 2009–10 season on 19 March 2010, Vahalahti signed a two-year contract extension to remain with TPS.

== Career statistics ==
=== Regular season and playoffs ===
			Regular season					Playoffs
Season	Team	League	GP	G	A	Pts	PIM	GP	G	A	Pts	PIM
1994–95	Kiekko-67	FIN U20	1	0	0	0	0	—	—	—	—	—
1995–96	TPS	FIN U20	33	12	8	20	37	—	—	—	—	—
1995–96	Kiekko-67	FIN.2	2	0	0	0	0	—	—	—	—	—
1996–97	TPS	FIN U20	33	14	10	24	14	—	—	—	—	—
1996–97	Kiekko-67	FIN.2	4	1	0	1	0	—	—	—	—	—
1997–98	TPS	FIN U20	36	18	14	32	4	7	5	4	9	4
1998–99	TUTO Hockey	FIN.2	21	15	18	33	8	—	—	—	—	—
1998–99	TPS	SM-l	31	8	5	13	4	10	2	2	4	4
1999–2000	TPS	SM-l	53	15	15	30	22	10	3	1	4	0
2000–01	TPS	SM-l	53	12	15	27	8	10	3	4	7	4
2001–02	TPS	SM-l	56	11	24	35	12	8	1	3	4	2
2002–03	TPS	SM-l	54	15	24	39	34	7	1	2	3	0
2003–04	TPS	SM-l	50	18	22	40	10	4	0	0	0	0
2004–05	TPS	SM-l	46	11	19	30	10	6	1	0	1	2
2005–06	TPS	SM-l	56	15	10	25	28	2	0	1	1	6
2006–07	TPS	SM-l	54	21	23	44	14	2	0	0	0	0
2007–08	Linköpings HC	SEL	53	4	8	12	8	16	0	0	0	2
2008–09	TPS	SM-l	58	15	19	34	20	8	3	3	6	12
2009–10	TPS	SM-l	57	21	26	47	24	15	4	8	12	6
2010–11	TPS	SM-l	27	5	19	24	10	—	—	—	—	—
2011–12	TPS	SM-l	59	21	28	49	8	2	0	0	0	0
2012–13	TPS	SM-l	52	8	24	32	18	—	—	—	—	—
2013–14	Lukko	Liiga	59	20	32	52	20	15	6	7	13	6
2014–15	Lukko	Liiga	57	10	38	48	22	3	2	1	3	0
2015–16	Lukko	Liiga	55	14	33	47	16	5	2	1	3	0
2016–17	Lukko	Liiga	60	14	33	47	14	—	—	—	—	—
2017–18	Lukko	Liiga	40	6	17	23	8	—	—	—	—	—
Liiga totals			977	260	427	687	300	107	27	34	61	42

=== International ===
Year	Team	Event	GP	G	A	Pts	PIM
2009	Finland	WC	4	0	0	0	2
