= Kalle Maalahti =

Finnish ice hockey player

- Born: 30 April 1991 (age 34) Lappeenranta, Finland
- Height: 5 ft 10 in (178 cm)
- Weight: 198 lb (90 kg; 14 st 2 lb)
- Position: Defense
- Shoots: Left
- team Former teams: Free Agent; SaiPa; Ilves; HV71
- Playing career: 2011–present

Kalle Maalahti (born 30 April 1991) is a Finnish professional ice hockey player who is currently an unrestricted free agent. He most recently played with HV71 in the Swedish Hockey League (SHL). He previously played with SaiPa and Ilves of the Liiga. He initially joined HV71 on loan from SaiPa.
