= Elias Fälth =

Swedish ice hockey player (born 1981)

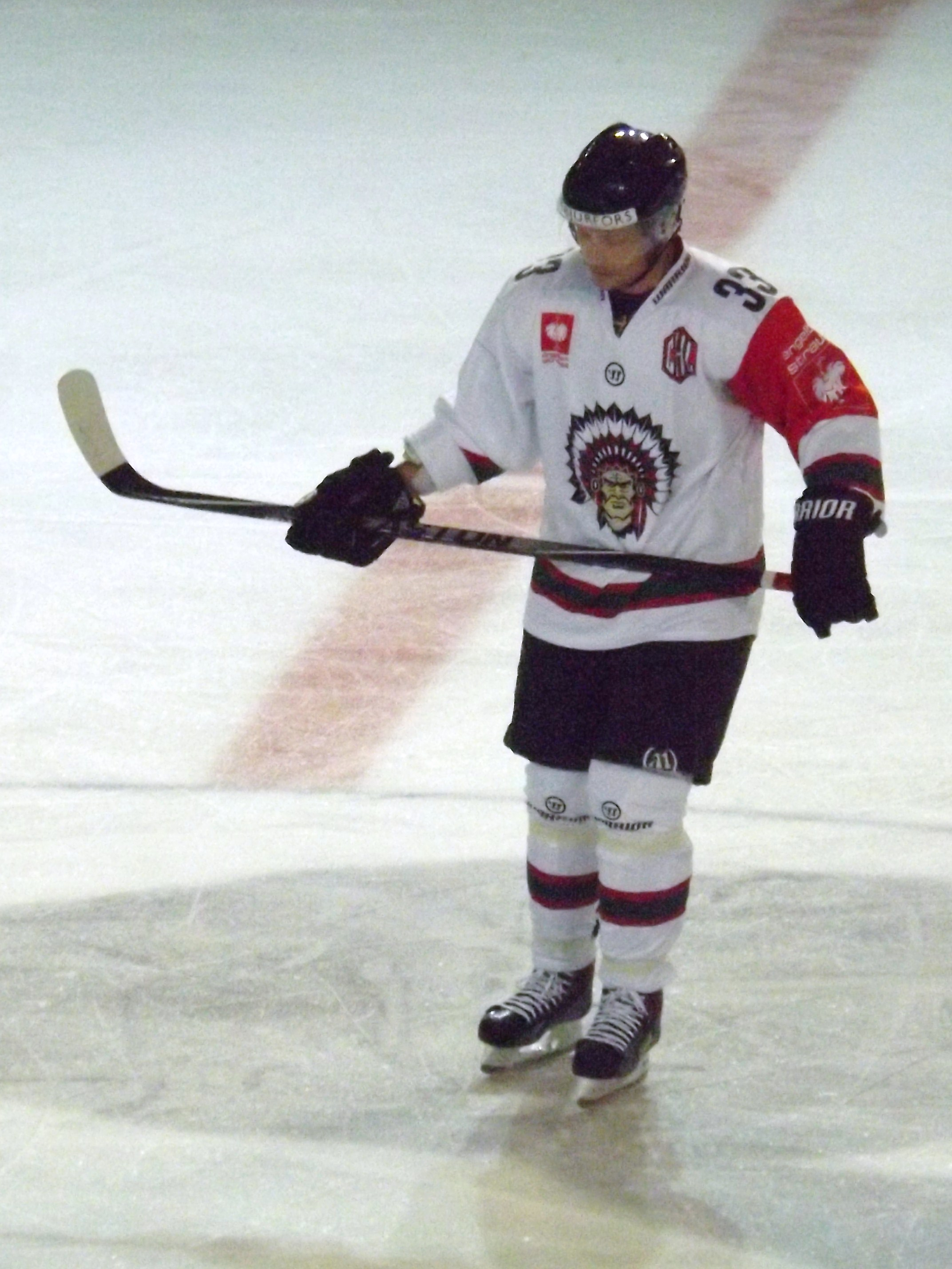
- Born: March 30, 1981 (age 44) Nacka, Sweden
- Height: 5 ft 9 in (175 cm)
- Weight: 170 lb (77 kg; 12 st 2 lb)
- Position: Defence
- Shoots: Right
- Liiga team Former teams: Tappara; Brynäs IF; Luleå HF; HV71; Frölunda HC
- National team: Sweden
- Playing career: 1999–present

Elias Fälth (born March 30, 1981) is a Swedish professional ice hockey defenceman, currently playing for Tappara Tampere in the Finnish Liiga.

== Playing career ==
Fälth saw his first minutes in Sweden’s second division Allsvenskan with Huddinge IK during the 1999-2000 season. Until 2010, he played for five other Allsvenskan sides, including the Halmstad Hammers, Nybro Vikings, Borås HC, VIK Västerås HK and Almtuna IS.

He signed with Luleå HF of the Swedish elite-league SHL in 2010, where he spent two years, before transferring to HV71 in 2012. In 2014, Fälth moved on to Frölunda HC. In his second year with Frölunda, he helped the team win the Swedish championship and the Champions Hockey League title.

He did not have his contract renewed by Frölunda following the 2015–16 campaign and then signed with fellow SHL outfit Brynäs IF in May 2016.

== International play ==
Fälth made his debut with the Swedish national team in November 2010 and was a member of the gold-winning Swedish squad at the 2013 World Championship. He made 10 appearances during the tournament, scoring one goal.

== Career statistics ==
=== Regular season and playoffs ===
			Regular season					Playoffs
Season	Team	League	GP	G	A	Pts	PIM	GP	G	A	Pts	PIM
1999–00	Huddinge IK	Allsv	45	2	4	6	40	—	—	—	—	—
1999–00	Huddinge IK	J20	—	—	—	—	—	4	1	0	1	10
2000–01	Huddinge IK	Div. 1	47	14	17	31	69	7	4	3	7	8
2001–02	Huddinge IK	Allsv	43	8	7	15	52	—	—	—	—	—
2002–03	Halmstad Hammers	Allsv	41	9	5	14	66	—	—	—	—	—
2003–04	Halmstad Hammers	Allsv	46	6	11	17	24	—	—	—	—	—
2004–05	Halmstad Hammers	Allsv	41	5	7	12	38	2	0	0	0	0
2005–06	Nybro IF	Allsv	35	3	3	6	53	—	—	—	—	—
2006–07	Nybro IF	Allsv	43	10	20	30	94	—	—	—	—	—
2007–08	Borås HC	Allsv	43	7	15	22	98	4	0	0	0	4
2008–09	VIK Västerås HK	Allsv	39	5	16	21	44	8	3	0	3	26
2009–10	Almtuna IS	Allsv	48	6	16	22	42	10	1	0	1	8
2010–11	Luleå HF	SEL	53	6	28	34	14	1	0	0	0	0
2011–12	Luleå HF	SEL	53	9	9	18	16	5	0	3	3	0
2012–13	HV71	SEL	49	5	18	23	24	4	1	3	4	0
2013–14	HV71	SHL	52	6	12	18	30	7	0	0	0	4
2014–15	Frölunda HC	SHL	50	8	16	24	32	12	0	2	2	8
2015–16	Frölunda HC	SHL	47	2	6	8	42	16	2	3	5	10
2016–17	Brynäs IF	SHL	35	2	9	11	12	16	1	1	2	10
SHL totals			339	38	98	136	170	61	4	12	16	32

Medal record

Men's Ice hockey

Representing Sweden

World Championships
Gold medal – first place	2013 Stockholm	

=== International ===
Year	Team	Event	Result	GP	G	A	Pts	PIM
2013	Sweden	WC	1st place, gold medalist(s)	10	1	0	1	4
Senior totals				10	1	0	1	4

== Awards and honors ==
Award	Year
SHL
Le Mat trophy (Frölunda HC)	2016
CHL
Champions (Frölunda HC)	2016
