= Jonne Virtanen =

Finnish ice hockey player

- Born: March 13, 1988 (age 37) Turku, Finland
- Height: 197 cm (6 ft 6 in)
- Weight: 118 kg (260 lb; 18 st 8 lb)
- Position: Centre
- Shot: Right
- Played for: Herning Blue Fox; TPS Turku; Rauman Lukko; JYP Jyväskylä; Saimaan Pallo; Vaasan Sport
- NHL draft: Undrafted
- Playing career: 2007–2022

Jonne Virtanen (born March 13, 1988) is a Finnish former professional ice hockey forward. He last played as an alternate captain of Vaasan Sport in the Liiga. Most of his career has been played as a depth centre but he has occasionally also played as a winger. He has been called the "tweet emperor of the Finnish [ice hockey] world" and is one of the most followed Liiga players on Twitter.

Virtanen made his SM-liiga debut with Saimaan Pallo (SaiPa) during the 2006–07 SM-liiga season, as the youngest player on the roster. At the conclusion of the 2020–21 Liiga season, he had played 580 regular season games in the Liiga and collected 36 goals and 88 assists for 124 total points and 487 penalty minutes.
