= Niklas Fogström =

Finnish ice hockey player

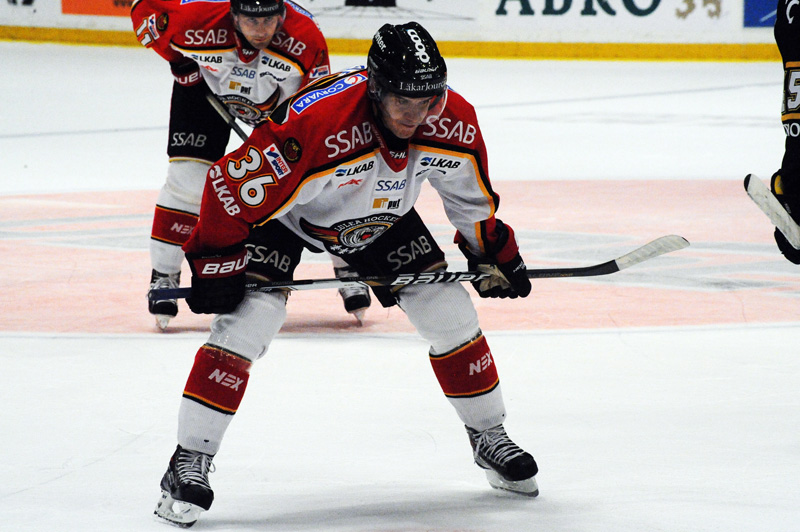
- Born: March 2, 1982 (age 43); Vaasa, Finland
- Height: 6 ft 0 in (183 cm)
- Weight: 190 lb (86 kg; 13 st 8 lb)
- Position: Centre
- Shoots: Left
- GET team Former teams: Storhamar Ishockey; Vaasan Sport; Lukko; Tingsryds AIF; Nyköpings Hockey; Mora IK; Luleå HF; Linköpings HC; Färjestad BK
- NHL draft: Undrafted
- Playing career: 2000–present

Niklas Fogström (born March 2, 1982) is a Finnish ice hockey player. He is currently playing with Storhamar Ishockey in the Norwegian GET-ligaen.

Fogström made his Swedish Hockey League debut playing with Luleå HF during the 2012–13 season.

== Career statistics ==
			Regular season					Playoffs
Season	Team	League	GP	G	A	Pts	PIM	GP	G	A	Pts	PIM
1996–97	Vaasan Sport U16	U16 SM-sarja	2	0	0	0	0	—	—	—	—	—
1997–98	Vaasan Sport U16	U16 SM-sarja Q	10	8	7	15	6	—	—	—	—	—
1998–99	Vaasan Sport U20	U20 I-divisioona	8	2	4	6	2	—	—	—	—	—
1999–00	Vaasan Sport U18	U18 I-divisioona	—	—	—	—	—	—	—	—	—	—
2000–01	Vaasan Sport U20	U20 I-divisioona	23	16	18	34	26	4	1	5	6	4
2000–01	Vaasan Sport	Mestis	27	0	1	1	2	3	0	0	0	0
2001–02	Lukko U20	U20 SM-liiga	44	18	40	58	28	—	—	—	—	—
2001–02	Lukko	SM-liiga	3	0	0	0	0	—	—	—	—	—
2002–03	Lukko U20	U20 SM-liiga	2	0	2	2	2	—	—	—	—	—
2002–03	Vaasan Sport U20	U20 Suomi-sarja	2	3	3	6	2	—	—	—	—	—
2002–03	Vaasan Sport	Mestis	37	2	11	13	24	7	1	1	2	0
2003–04	Vaasan Sports	Mestis	40	6	10	16	32	5	0	0	0	0
2004–05	Vaasan Sports	Mestis	32	5	8	13	14	11	0	1	1	0
2005–06	Tingsryds AIF	Division 1	41	14	27	41	42	3	2	2	4	12
2006–07	Nyköpings HK	HockeyAllsvenskan	45	8	18	26	56	5	2	6	8	12
2007–08	Nyköpings HK	HockeyAllsvenskan	38	8	20	28	52	—	—	—	—	—
2008–09	Lukko	SM-liiga	8	0	0	0	2	—	—	—	—	—
2008–09	Mora IK	HockeyAllsvenskan	34	14	10	24	34	3	2	0	2	2
2009–10	Mora IK	HockeyAllsvenskan	50	8	33	41	54	2	0	0	0	6
2010–11	Mora IK	HockeyAllsvenskan	51	14	22	36	34	10	0	2	2	6
2011–12	Mora IK	HockeyAllsvenskan	50	11	33	44	40	—	—	—	—	—
2012–13	Luleå HF	Elitserien	52	10	13	23	12	13	1	1	2	10
2013–14	Luleå HF	SHL	55	6	8	14	14	6	0	0	0	2
2014–15	Luleå HF	SHL	53	5	14	19	26	9	1	1	2	2
2015–16	Linköping HC	SHL	51	4	13	17	14	6	0	1	1	0
2016–17	Linköping HC	SHL	52	6	7	13	22	6	0	0	0	0
2017–18	Färjestad BK	SHL	43	4	6	10	6	3	0	0	0	0
2018–19	Storhamar Ishockey	Norway	45	5	14	19	12	16	1	7	8	33
2019–20	Forshaga IF	HockeyEttan	3	2	0	2	0	—	—	—	—	—
2019–20	Mora IK	HockeyAllsvenskan	36	1	4	5	22	—	—	—	—	—
Elitserien/SHL totals			306	35	61	96	94	43	2	3	5	14
HockeyAllsvenskan totals			304	64	140	204	292	20	4	8	12	26
