= Ryan Glenn =

Canadian ice hockey player

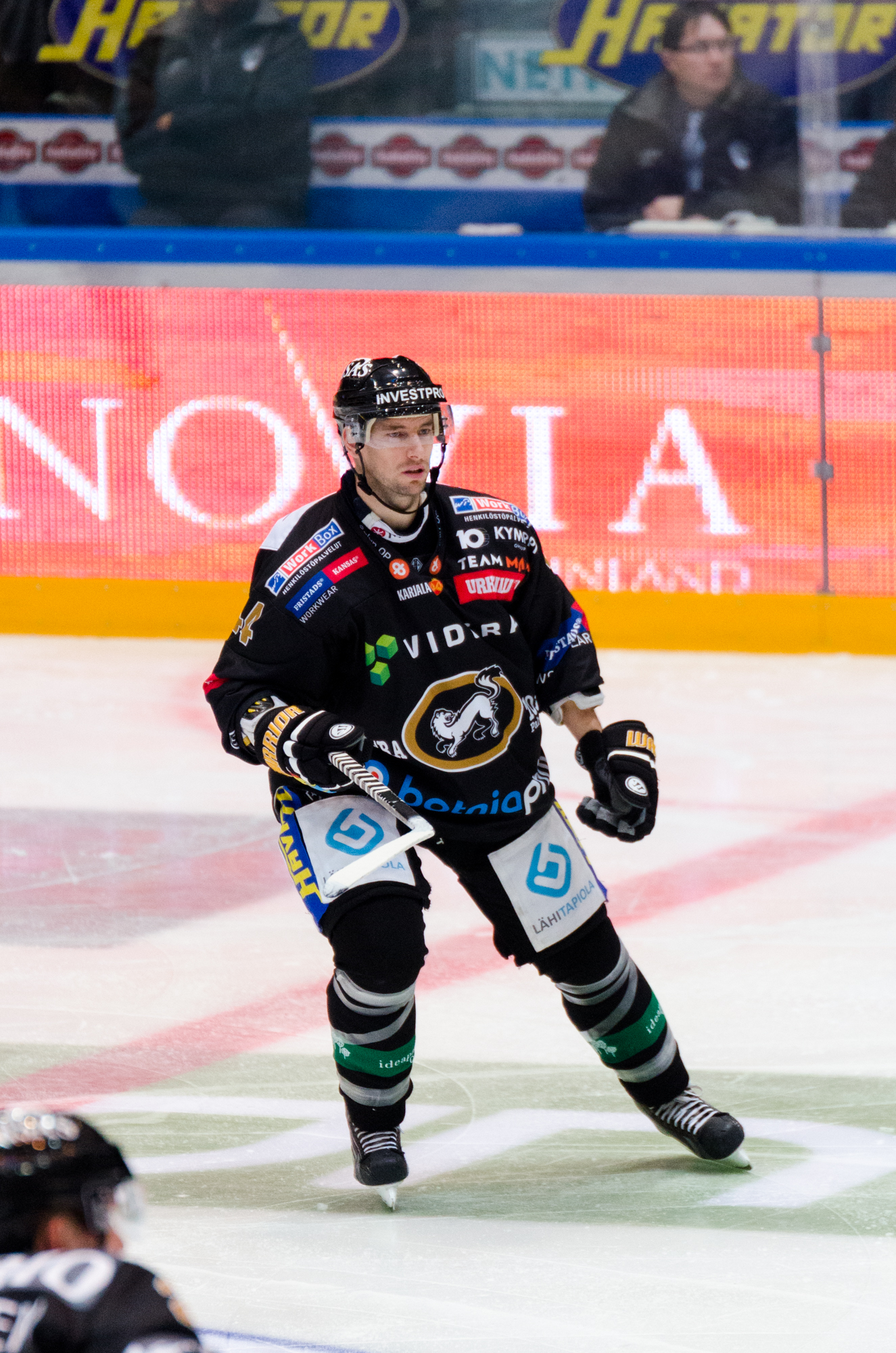
- Born: June 7, 1980 (age 45) Port Coquitlam, British Columbia, Canada
- Height: 6 ft 1 in (185 cm)
- Weight: 198 lb (90 kg; 14 st 2 lb)
- Position: Defence
- Shot: Left
- Played for: Hartford Wolf Pack; Milwaukee Admirals; Syracuse Crunch; Lowell Lock Monsters; Providence Bruins; Wilkes-Barre/Scranton Penguins; Peoria Rivermen; Södertälje SK; Ilves Tampere; KalPa; EC Red Bull Salzburg; SaiPa; Oulun Kärpät; HC Sparta Praha; JYP Jyväskylä; HC Bolzano
- NHL draft: 145th overall, 2000; Montreal Canadiens
- Playing career: 2004–2022

Ryan Glenn (born June 7, 1980) is a Canadian professional ice hockey defenceman who has played for several teams in Europe. He was selected by the Montreal Canadiens in the 5th round (145th overall) of the 2000 NHL entry draft. After playing his second season in the EBEL in 2016–17 with HC Bolzano, Glenn left as a free agent to continue in the league on a one-year deal with EC VSV on May 2, 2017.

== Career statistics ==
			Regular season					Playoffs
Season	Team	League	GP	G	A	Pts	PIM	GP	G	A	Pts	PIM
1999–2000	Walpole Stars	EJHL	42	19	40	59	54	—	—	—	—	—
2000–01	St. Lawrence University	ECAC	37	3	1	4	34	—	—	—	—	—
2001–02	St. Lawrence University	ECAC	32	3	6	9	27	—	—	—	—	—
2002–03	St. Lawrence University	ECAC	36	5	9	14	42	—	—	—	—	—
2003–04	St. Lawrence University	ECAC	40	7	22	29	67	—	—	—	—	—
2004–05	Charlotte Checkers	ECHL	61	9	19	28	50	15	3	11	14	10
2004–05	Hartford Wolf Pack	AHL	11	0	0	0	14	—	—	—	—	—
2005–06	Milwaukee Admirals	AHL	3	0	0	0	2	—	—	—	—	—
2005–06	Charlotte Checkers	ECHL	26	0	9	9	26	—	—	—	—	—
2005–06	Syracuse Crunch	AHL	3	0	0	0	8	—	—	—	—	—
2005–06	Lowell Lock Monsters	AHL	28	1	6	7	21	—	—	—	—	—
2006–07	Charlotte Checkers	ECHL	5	0	1	1	2	—	—	—	—	—
2006–07	Wilkes–Barre/Scranton Penguins	AHL	18	0	3	3	6	—	—	—	—	—
2006–07	Providence Bruins	AHL	35	3	8	11	29	13	0	6	6	4
2007–08	Peoria Rivermen	AHL	63	5	11	16	32	—	—	—	—	—
2007–08	Alaska Aces	ECHL	11	1	8	9	4	—	—	—	—	—
2008–09	IF Troja/Ljungby	Allsv	44	9	14	23	90	2	0	3	3	0
2009–10	Södertälje SK	SEL	31	1	7	8	24	—	—	—	—	—
2009–10	Ilves	SM-liiga	22	2	3	5	37	—	—	—	—	—
2010–11	Ilves	SM-liiga	51	9	7	16	44	6	1	4	5	8
2011–12	Ilves	SM-liiga	44	5	9	14	40	—	—	—	—	—
2011–12	KalPa	SM-liiga	14	2	9	11	37	6	0	1	1	4
2012–13	EC Red Bull Salzburg	AUT	50	4	14	18	16	12	0	6	6	2
2013–14	SaiPa	Liiga	59	9	21	30	53	12	0	0	0	6
2014–15	Kärpät	Liiga	56	5	14	19	32	16	1	4	5	8
2015–16	HC Sparta Praha	ELH	14	0	3	3	10	—	—	—	—	—
2015–16	JYP	Liiga	16	0	2	2	16	12	1	2	3	6
2016–17	HC Bolzano	AUT	48	9	22	31	16	9	1	3	4	0
2017–18	EC VSV	AUT	51	8	17	25	16	—	—	—	—	—
2018–19	Fehérvár AV19	AUT	21	0	9	9	6	—	—	—	—	—
2018–19	HC ’05 iClinic Banská Bystrica	SVK	6	0	0	0	2	2	0	0	0	0
2019–20	EHC Lustenau	AlpsHL	25	5	19	24	6	—	—	—	—	—
2019–20	EHC Lustenau	AUT.2	2	0	5	5	2	4	0	3	3	4
2020–21	TH Unia Oświęcim	POL	31	9	14	23	18	6	1	2	3	0
2021–22	TH Unia Oświęcim	POL	26	5	13	18	10	15	2	6	8	8
AHL totals			161	9	28	37	112	13	0	6	6	4
Liiga totals			262	32	65	97	259	52	3	11	14	32
AUT totals			170	21	62	83	54	21	1	9	10	2

== Awards and honours ==
Award	Year
College
ECAC Champion	2001
ECAC First All-Star Team	2004
Liiga
Champion (Oulun Kärpät)	2015
