= Mathias Karlsson =

Swedish ice hockey player

- Born: 22 August 1995 (age 30) Linköping, Sweden
- Height: 5 ft 11 in (180 cm)
- Weight: 181 lb (82 kg; 12 st 13 lb)
- Position: Centre
- Shoots: Left
- Div.1 team Former teams: Tranås AIF; Linköpings HC
- Playing career: 2014–present

Mathias Karlsson (born 22 August 1995) is a Swedish professional ice hockey player. He is currently playing with Tranås AIF of the Hockeyettan (Div.1).

Karlsson made his Swedish Hockey League debut playing with Linköpings HC during the 2014–15 SHL season.
