= Johan Forsberg =

Swedish ice hockey player (born 1985)

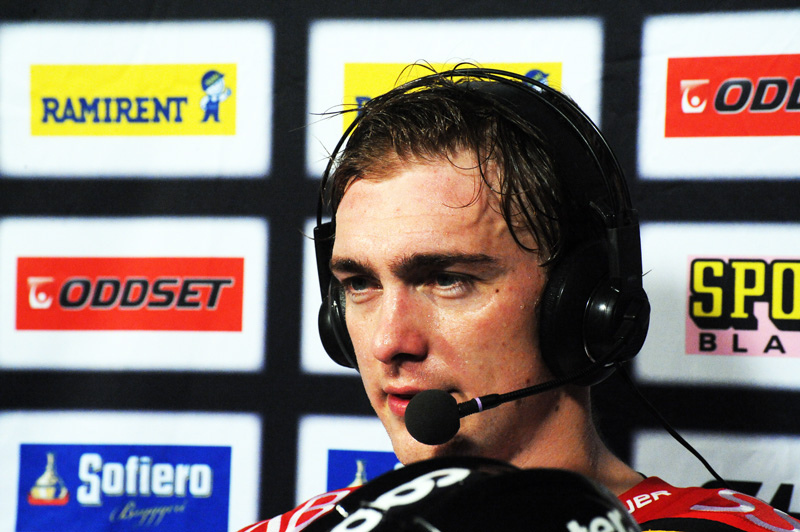
- Born: June 29, 1985 (age 41) Piteå, Sweden
- Height: 6 ft 1 in (185 cm)
- Weight: 192 lb (87 kg; 13 st 10 lb)
- Position: Right wing
- Shot: Right
- Played for: Skellefteå AIK; Luleå HF
- Playing career: 2004–2020

Johan Forsberg (born June 29, 1985) is a Swedish former professional ice hockey winger. He is most known for playing for Luleå HF in Swedish Hockey League (SHL).

Johan became popular among Skellefteå AIK fans after leading the league in playoff goals in 2010 despite the team's elimination in the semifinals.

== Career statistics ==
			Regular season					Playoffs
Season	Team	League	GP	G	A	Pts	PIM	GP	G	A	Pts	PIM
2004–05	Piteå HC	Allsv	42	6	10	16	8	8	4	1	5	2
2005–06	Malmö Redhawks	Allsv	41	4	8	12	12	8	0	0	0	4
2006–07	IF Björklöven	Allsv	45	10	9	19	28	10	5	0	5	6
2007–08	IF Björklöven	Allsv	42	6	21	27	44	2	0	0	0	2
2008–09	IF Björklöven	Allsv	43	16	15	31	28	—	—	—	—	—
2009–10	Skellefteå AIK	SEL	55	9	17	26	16	12	7	3	10	2
2010–11	Skellefteå AIK	SEL	34	4	9	13	4	18	1	1	2	8
2011–12	Skellefteå AIK	SEL	55	4	6	10	39	15	1	1	2	10
2012–13	Skellefteå AIK	SEL	39	4	6	10	12	5	1	0	1	0
2013–14	Luleå HF	SHL	31	3	2	5	20	6	0	0	0	0
2014–15	Luleå HF	SHL	51	11	7	18	33	9	3	0	3	4
2015–16	Luleå HF	SHL	52	7	5	12	12	11	1	0	1	0
2016–17	Luleå HF	SHL	52	12	5	17	6	2	0	0	0	0
2017–18	Luleå HF	SHL	52	6	4	10	8	3	0	0	0	0
2018–19	Luleå HF	SHL	49	4	6	10	6	9	0	0	0	0
2019–20	MoDo Hockey	Allsv	52	7	13	20	14	2	0	1	1	2
SHL totals			470	64	67	131	156	90	14	5	19	24
