= Marcus Fagerudd =

Finnish ice hockey player

- Born: December 17, 1992 (age 33) Jakobstad, Finland
- Height: 5 ft 10 in (178 cm)
- Weight: 176 lb (80 kg; 12 st 8 lb)
- Position: Defence
- Shoots: Right
- SHL team: Luleå HF
- NHL draft: Undrafted
- Playing career: 2011–present

Marcus Fagerudd (born December 17, 1992) is a Finnish professional ice hockey player. He currently plays for Luleå HF of the Swedish Hockey League (SHL). He is a Swedish-speaking Finn.
