= 2012–13 SM-liiga season =

2012–13 SM-liiga
- League: SM-liiga
- Sport: Ice hockey
- Duration: September 2012 – April 2013
- Number of teams: 14
- TV partner(s): UrhoTV, Nelonen

Regular season
- Best record: Jokerit
- Runners-up: Tappara
- Season MVP: Antti Raanta
- Top scorer: Juha-Pekka Haataja

Playoffs
- Playoffs MVP: Antti Raanta

Finals
- Champions: Ässät
- Runners-up: Tappara

SM-liiga seasons
- ← 2011–12 2013–14 →

The 2012–13 SM-liiga season was the 38th season of the SM-liiga, the top level of ice hockey in Finland, since the league's formation in 1975. The title was won by Ässät Pori who defeated Tappara Tampere in the finals.

== Teams ==
Team	City	Head coach	Arena	Capacity	Captain
Ässät	Pori	Karri Kivi	Porin jäähalli	6,481	Ville Uusitalo
Blues	Espoo	Mikko Saarinen‡	Barona Areena	6,798	Arto Laatikainen
HIFK	Helsinki	Raimo Summanen‡	Helsingin jäähalli	8,200	Ville Peltonen
HPK	Hämeenlinna	Ari-Pekka Selin	Ritarihalli	5,360	Ville Viitaluoma
Ilves	Tampere	Tuomas Tuokkola‡	Tampereen jäähalli	7,600	Erkki Rajamäki
Jokerit	Helsinki	Tomi Lämsä	Hartwall Areena	13,349	Ossi Väänänen
JYP	Jyväskylä	Jyrki Aho	Synergia-areena	4,500	Éric Perrin
KalPa	Kuopio	Jari Laukkanen	Niiralan monttu	5,004	Sami Kapanen
Kärpät	Oulu	Hannu Aravirta	Oulun Energia Areena	6,768	Ilkka Mikkola
Lukko	Rauma	Risto Dufva	Äijänsuo Arena	5,400	Otto Honkaheimo
Pelicans	Lahti	Kai Suikkanen	Isku Areena	5,534	Tommi Paakkolanvaara
SaiPa	Lappeenranta	Pekka Tirkkonen	Kisapuisto	4,825	Ville Koho
Tappara	Tampere	Jukka Rautakorpi	Tampereen jäähalli	7,600	Tuukka Mäntylä
TPS	Turku	Juha Pajuoja‡	HK Arena	11,820	Ville Vahalahti

- Head coaches marked with ‡ took their jobs mid-season.

== Regular season ==
Each team played four times against every other team (twice home and twice away), getting to 52 games. Additionally, the teams were divided to two groups, where teams would play one extra game. One group included Ässät, Blues, HIFK, Jokerit, Kärpät, Lukko and TPS, while other had HPK, Ilves, JYP, KalPa, Pelicans, SaiPa and Tappara.

Additionally, there were two games where teams could choose the opponents. These were played back-to-back in January and the choices were made in December, with team with lowest point total to that date was able to choose first. These pairs were: Pelicans-Ilves, TPS-Lukko, Ässät-Blues, HIFK-HPK, Tappara-Jokerit, Kärpät-KalPa and SaiPa-JYP.

The Top 10 made the playoffs, with the top six advancing straight to the quarter-finals, and teams between 7th and 10th positions playing wild card round for the final two spots. The last-placed team Ilves had to play best-of-seven series against Mestis winner Jukurit.

Team	GP	W	OTW	OTL	L	GF	GA	+/−	P
Jokerit	60	28	10	7	15	168	136	+32	111
Tappara	60	29	7	7	17	178	145	+33	108
JYP	60	28	5	9	18	161	142	+19	103
Ässät	60	27	8	5	20	160	130	+30	102
KalPa	60	24	9	7	20	172	145	+27	97
HPK	60	20	12	12	16	157	144	+13	96
Kärpät	60	23	9	6	22	172	150	+22	93
HIFK	60	26	3	7	24	153	163	-10	91
SaiPa	60	23	7	6	24	162	173	-11	89
Lukko	60	24	3	8	25	151	170	-19	86
Pelicans	60	22	7	3	28	163	180	-17	83
Blues	60	21	6	5	28	151	164	-13	80
TPS	60	12	8	12	28	144	182	-38	64
Ilves	60	13	6	6	35	124	193	-69	57

== Playoffs ==
=== Wild card round (best-of-three) ===
Kärpät-Lukko 1-2

Kärpät-Lukko 4-5
Lukko-Kärpät 2-4
Kärpät-Lukko 2-3 (OT)

HIFK-SaiPa 2-1

HIFK-SaiPa 2-3 (OT)
SaiPa-HIFK 2-3 (OT)
HIFK-SaiPa 5-2

=== Quarterfinals (best-of-seven) ===
Jokerit-Lukko 2-4

Jokerit-Lukko 3-0
Lukko-Jokerit 5-2
Jokerit-Lukko 3-4 (OT)
Lukko-Jokerit 2-1
Jokerit-Lukko 5-2
Lukko-Jokerit 3-1

Tappara-HIFK 4-1

Tappara-HIFK 3-1
HIFK-Tappara 1-4
Tappara-HIFK 3-2
HIFK-Tappara 3-2
Tappara-HIFK 3-1

JYP-HPK 4-1

JYP-HPK 3-1
HPK-JYP 3-2
JYP-HPK 4-2
HPK-JYP 2-3 (OT)
JYP-HPK 5-1

Ässät-KalPa 4-1

Ässät-KalPa 2-1
KalPa-Ässät 0-2
Ässät-KalPa 5-2
KalPa-Ässät 5-0
Ässät-KalPa 3-0

=== Semifinals (best-of-seven) ===
Tappara-Lukko 4-0

Tappara-Lukko 3-2 (OT)
Lukko-Tappara 3-4 (OT)
Tappara-Lukko 3-0
Lukko-Tappara 0-5

JYP-Ässät 1-4

JYP-Ässät 3-4 (OT)
Ässät-JYP 2-0
JYP-Ässät 1-4
Ässät-JYP 1-2
JYP-Ässät 0-1

=== Bronze-medal game ===
JYP-Lukko 2-0

=== Finals (best-of-seven) ===
Tappara-Ässät 2-4

Tappara-Ässät 2-1
Ässät-Tappara 5-1
Tappara-Ässät 3-2
Ässät-Tappara 4-0
Tappara-Ässät 1-2 (OT)
Ässät-Tappara 3-2

== Relegation (best-of-seven) ==
Ilves-Jukurit 4-1

Ilves-Jukurit 2-0
Jukurit-Ilves 1-3
Ilves-Jukurit 2-1 (OT)
Jukurit-Ilves 7-4
Ilves-Jukurit 4-2
