= 2015–16 Champions Hockey League =

European ice hockey tournament

Tournament details
- Dates: 20 August 2015 – 9 February 2016
- Teams: 48

Final positions
- Champions: (Sweden) Frölunda HC (1st title)
- Runners-up: (Finland) Kärpät

Tournament statistics
- Games played: 157
- Goals scored: 802 (5.11 per game)
- Attendance: 513,760 (3,272 per game)
- Scoring leader: (United States) Ryan Lasch (16 points)

Awards
- MVP: (United States) Ryan Lasch

The 2015–16 Champions Hockey League was the second season of the Champions Hockey League, a European ice hockey tournament launched by 26 founding clubs, six leagues and the International Ice Hockey Federation (IIHF).

The regulation round began on 20 August 2015 and ended on 6 September 2015. The playoffs began on 22 September 2015 and ended with the Champions Hockey League Final on 9 February 2016. Frölunda HC defeated Kärpät 2–1 to win the second edition of Champions Hockey League.

== Team allocation ==
A total of 48 teams from twelve different European first-tier leagues participate in the 2015–16 Champions Hockey League.

=== Team license ===
The teams were decided with regards to different licenses for the founding teams, leagues and wildcards.

- A license: The 26 founding teams get an A license, if they play in the first-tier league of their respective domestic league system in the 2015–16 season.
- B license: Two teams – the regular-season winner and the play-off champion in the 2014–15 season – from each of the founding leagues (the Austrian EBEL, the Czech Extraliga, the Finnish Liiga, the German DEL, the Swedish SHL and the Swiss NLA) received a B licence to the tournament. If those teams had already received an A license, other teams from the league took the B license spots. The order the B licenses were handed out is:
1. National champion
2. Regular season winner
3. Runner-up, regular season
4. Play-off finalist
5. Best placed semifinal loser
6. Worst placed semifinal loser
- C license: There were 10 wild cards. The champions from Norway, Denmark, Slovakia, France and the United Kingdom—like the previous season—got wild cards. From Slovakia, France, Norway and the United Kingdom, a second team also got a wild card. One wild card license were assigned to the 2014–15 IIHF Continental Cup winner HK Neman Grodno.

=== Teams ===
| Team | City/Area | League | Qualification | License |
|---|---|---|---|---|
| (Austria) Red Bull Salzburg | Salzburg | Austrian Hockey League | founding club | A |
| (Austria) Vienna Capitals | Vienna | Austrian Hockey League | founding club | A |
| (Czech Republic) Bílí Tygři Liberec | Liberec | Czech Extraliga | founding club | A |
| (Czech Republic) HC Pardubice | Pardubice | Czech Extraliga | founding club | A |
| (Czech Republic) HC Sparta Praha | Prague | Czech Extraliga | founding club | A |
| (Czech Republic) Vítkovice Steel | Ostrava | Czech Extraliga | founding club | A |
| (Finland) HIFK | Helsinki | Liiga | founding club | A |
| (Finland) JYP | Jyväskylä | Liiga | founding club | A |
| (Finland) KalPa | Kuopio | Liiga | founding club | A |
| (Finland) Kärpät | Oulu | Liiga | founding club | A |
| (Finland) Tappara | Tampere | Liiga | founding club | A |
| (Finland) TPS | Turku | Liiga | founding club | A |
| (Germany) Adler Mannheim | Mannheim | Deutsche Eishockey Liga | founding club | A |
| (Germany) Eisbären Berlin | Berlin | Deutsche Eishockey Liga | founding club | A |
| (Germany) ERC Ingolstadt | Ingolstadt | Deutsche Eishockey Liga | founding club | A |
| (Germany) Krefeld Pinguine | Krefeld | Deutsche Eishockey Liga | founding club | A |
| (Switzerland) SC Bern | Bern | National League A | founding club | A |
| (Switzerland) Fribourg-Gottéron | Fribourg | National League A | founding club | A |
| (Switzerland) ZSC Lions | Zürich | National League A | founding club | A |
| (Switzerland) EV Zug | Zug | National League A | founding club | A |
| (Sweden) Djurgårdens IF | Stockholm | Swedish Hockey League | founding club | A |
| (Sweden) Frölunda HC | Gothenburg | Swedish Hockey League | founding club | A |
| (Sweden) Färjestad BK | Karlstad | Swedish Hockey League | founding club | A |
| (Sweden) HV71 | Jönköping | Swedish Hockey League | founding club | A |
| (Sweden) Linköpings HC | Linköping | Swedish Hockey League | founding club | A |
| (Sweden) Luleå HF | Luleå | Swedish Hockey League | founding club | A |
| (Austria) Black Wings Linz | Linz | Austrian Hockey League | regular season runner-up | B |
| (Austria) KAC Klagenfurt | Klagenfurt | Austrian Hockey League | play-off semi-finalist | B |
| (Czech Republic) Oceláři Třinec | Třinec | Czech Extraliga | regular season winner | B |
| (Czech Republic) HC Litvínov | Litvínov | Czech Extraliga | play-off champion | B |
| (Finland) Lukko | Rauma | Liiga | play-off semi-finalist | B |
| (Finland) Espoo Blues | Espoo | Liiga | regular season fifth | B |
| (Germany) Red Bull Munich | Munich | Deutsche Eishockey Liga | regular season runner-up | B |
| (Germany) Düsseldorfer EG | Düsseldorf | Deutsche Eishockey Liga | play-off semi-finalist | B |
| (Switzerland) HC Davos | Davos | National League A | play-off champion | B |
| (Switzerland) Genève-Servette | Geneva | National League A | play-off semi-finalist | B |
| (Sweden) Växjö Lakers | Växjö | Swedish Hockey League | play-off champion | B |
| (Sweden) Skellefteå AIK | Skellefteå | Swedish Hockey League | regular season winner | B |
| (Belarus) Neman Grodno | Grodno | Belarusian Extraleague | Continental Cup winner | C |
| (Norway) Stavanger Oilers | Stavanger | GET-ligaen | play-off champion | C |
| (Norway) Storhamar Ishockey | Hamar | GET-ligaen | regular season runner-up | C |
| (Slovakia) HC Košice | Košice | Tipsport Liga | play-off champion | C |
| (Slovakia) HK Nitra | Nitra | Tipsport Liga | regular season runner-up | C |
| (Denmark) SønderjyskE Ishockey | Vojens | Metal Ligaen | play-off champion | C |
| (United Kingdom) Sheffield Steelers | Sheffield | Elite Ice Hockey League | regular season champion | C |
| (United Kingdom) Braehead Clan | Glasgow | Elite Ice Hockey League | regular season runner-up | C |
| (France) Rapaces de Gap | Gap | Ligue Magnus | play-off champion | C |
| (France) Grenoble | Grenoble | Ligue Magnus | regular season winner | C |

== Round and draw dates ==
The schedule of the competition is as follows.

| Phase | Round | Draw date | First leg | Second leg |
|---|---|---|---|---|
| Group stage | Matchday 1 | 13 May 2015 | 20–21 August 2015 | |
| Group stage | Matchday 2 | 13 May 2015 | 22–23 August 2015 | |
| Group stage | Matchday 3 | 13 May 2015 | 27–28 August 2015 | |
| Group stage | Matchday 4 | 13 May 2015 | 29–30 August 2015 | |
| Group stage | Matchday 5 | 13 May 2015 | 3–4 September 2015 | |
| Group stage | Matchday 6 | 13 May 2015 | 5–6 September 2015 | |
| Playoff | Round of 32 | 8 September 2015 | 22 September 2015 | 6 October 2015 |
| Playoff | Round of 16 | 8 September 2015 | 3 November 2015 | 10 November 2015 |
| Playoff | Quarter-finals | 8 September 2015 | 1 December 2015 | 8 December 2015 |
| Playoff | Semi-finals | 8 September 2015 | 12 January 2016 | 19 January 2016 |
| Playoff | Final | 8 September 2015 | 9 February 2016 | |

== Group stage ==
Teams in the 2015–16 Champions Hockey League
Black: Group A; Purple: Group B; Blue: Group C; Red: Group D; Orange: Group E; Green: Group F; White: Group G; Yellow: Group H; Brown: Group I; Pink: Group J; Gold: Group K; Turquoise: Group L; Cyan: Group M; Asselian: Group N; Deep pink: Group O; Steel: Group P.

For the 2015–16 season, the regular season was expanded to 48 teams, divided into 16 groups with 3 teams in each group. The two first teams in each group advanced to the play-offs (round of 32).

The group stage began on 20 August and ended on 6 September 2015. The 48 teams were divided into 16 groups of three teams each. Each team played a double round-robin in their group, facing each team at home and on the road, giving 4 games per team. The 16 group winners and the 16 runners-up qualified for the playoffs.

=== Group stage draw ===
The 16 groups were determined by a draw taking place on 13 May 2015 in Prague, Czech Republic. The 48 teams had been ranked and placed into three pots of 16 teams each. Following the draw, each group consisted of one team from each pot. The seedings were as follows;

| Pot 1 | Pot 2 | Pot 3 |
|---|---|---|
| (Sweden) Växjö Lakers (Finland) Kärpät (Czech Republic) HC Litvínov (Switzerland) HC Davos (Austria) Red Bull Salzburg (Germany) Adler Mannheim (Sweden) Skellefteå AIK (Finland) Tappara (Czech Republic) Oceláři Třinec (Switzerland) ZSC Lions (Austria) Black Wings Linz (Germany) Red Bull Munich (Sweden) Frölunda HC (Finland) Lukko (Czech Republic) HC Sparta Praha (Switzerland) SC Bern | (Austria) Vienna Capitals (Germany) ERC Ingolstadt (Sweden) Linköpings HC (Finland) JYP (Czech Republic) HC Pardubice (Switzerland) Genève-Servette (Austria) KAC Klagenfurt (Germany) Düsseldorfer EG (Sweden) HV71 (Finland) Espoo Blues (Czech Republic) Vítkovice Steel (Switzerland) EV Zug (Germany) Eisbären Berlin (Sweden) Luleå HF (Finland) KalPa (Czech Republic) Bílí Tygři Liberec | (Switzerland) Fribourg-Gottéron (Germany) Krefeld Pinguine (Sweden) Färjestad BK (Finland) HIFK (Sweden) Djurgårdens IF (Finland) TPS (Slovakia) HC Košice (Norway) Stavanger Oilers (Denmark) SønderjyskE Ishockey (United Kingdom) Sheffield Steelers (France) Rapaces de Gap (Slovakia) HK Nitra (Norway) Storhamar Ishockey (United Kingdom) Braehead Clan (France) Grenoble (Belarus) Neman Grodno |

=== Tiebreakers ===
The teams were ranked according to points (3 points for a win in regular time, 2 points for an overtime win or shootout win, 1 point for an overtime loss or shootout loss, 0 points for a loss in regular time). If two or more teams were equal on points on completion of the group matches, the following criteria were applied in the order given to determine the rankings:

1. higher number of points obtained in the group matches played among the teams in question;
2. superior goal difference from the group matches played among the teams in question;
3. higher number of goals scored in the group matches played among the teams in question;
4. higher number of wins in regular time in the group matches played among the teams in question;
5. higher number of goals scored in one match in the group matches played among the teams in question;
6. if, after having applied criteria 1 to 5, teams still had an equal ranking in a two-way tie, criteria 1 to 5 were reapplied against the third team in the group. If this procedure did not lead to a decision, criteria 7 to 10 applied;
7. higher number of wins in overtime;
8. higher number of goals scored in shootout (if both matches ended in shootout);
9. if two teams still remained tied and they met in their group's final game, they played a shootout to determine which team is ranked higher;
10. higher pre-draw rankings.

=== Group A ===
| Pos | Team | Pld | W | OTW | OTL | L | GF | GA | GD | Pts | Qualification | LHC | HIFK | SCB |
|---|---|---|---|---|---|---|---|---|---|---|---|---|---|---|
| 1 | (Sweden) Linköpings HC | 4 | 3 | 1 | 0 | 0 | 14 | 4 | +10 | 11 | Advance to Playoffs | — | 2–0 | 3–2(SO) |
| 2 | (Finland) HIFK | 4 | 1 | 0 | 1 | 2 | 6 | 8 | −2 | 4 | Advance to Playoffs | 1–2 | — | 3–1 |
| 3 | (Switzerland) SC Bern | 4 | 0 | 1 | 1 | 2 | 7 | 15 | −8 | 3 | | 1–7 | 3–2(SO) | — |

Source: championshockeyleague.net
Rules for classification: Group stage tiebreakers

=== Group B ===
| Pos | Team | Pld | W | OTW | OTL | L | GF | GA | GD | Pts | Qualification | TAP | DIF | EVZ |
|---|---|---|---|---|---|---|---|---|---|---|---|---|---|---|
| 1 | (Finland) Tappara | 4 | 3 | 0 | 1 | 0 | 16 | 6 | +10 | 10 | Advance to Playoffs | — | 2–3(OT) | 3–1 |
| 2 | (Sweden) Djurgårdens IF | 4 | 2 | 1 | 0 | 1 | 13 | 11 | +2 | 8 | Advance to Playoffs | 2–4 | — | 5–3 |
| 3 | (Switzerland) EV Zug | 4 | 0 | 0 | 0 | 4 | 6 | 18 | −12 | 0 | | 0–7 | 2–3 | — |

Source: championshockeyleague.net
Rules for classification: Group stage tiebreakers

=== Group C ===
| Pos | Team | Pld | W | OTW | OTL | L | GF | GA | GD | Pts | Qualification | HV71 | RBS | SON |
|---|---|---|---|---|---|---|---|---|---|---|---|---|---|---|
| 1 | (Sweden) HV71 | 4 | 4 | 0 | 0 | 0 | 16 | 4 | +12 | 12 | Advance to Playoffs | — | 4–1 | 7–1 |
| 2 | (Austria) Red Bull Salzburg | 4 | 1 | 0 | 0 | 3 | 10 | 13 | −3 | 3 | Advance to Playoffs | 1–3 | — | 7–2 |
| 3 | (Denmark) SønderjyskE Ishockey | 4 | 1 | 0 | 0 | 3 | 8 | 17 | −9 | 3 | | 1–2 | 4–1 | — |

Source: championshockeyleague.net
Rules for classification: Group stage tiebreakers

=== Group D ===
| Pos | Team | Pld | W | OTW | OTL | L | GF | GA | GD | Pts | Qualification | SKE | LIB | NIT |
|---|---|---|---|---|---|---|---|---|---|---|---|---|---|---|
| 1 | (Sweden) Skellefteå AIK | 4 | 3 | 1 | 0 | 0 | 16 | 6 | +10 | 11 | Advance to Playoffs | — | 5–2 | 3–2(SO) |
| 2 | (Czech Republic) Bílí Tygři Liberec | 4 | 2 | 0 | 0 | 2 | 13 | 9 | +4 | 6 | Advance to Playoffs | 0–4 | — | 2–0 |
| 3 | (Slovakia) HK Nitra | 4 | 0 | 0 | 1 | 3 | 4 | 18 | −14 | 1 | | 2–4 | 0–9 | — |

Source: championshockeyleague.net
Rules for classification: Group stage tiebreakers

=== Group E ===
| Pos | Team | Pld | W | OTW | OTL | L | GF | GA | GD | Pts | Qualification | HCD | FBK | PCE |
|---|---|---|---|---|---|---|---|---|---|---|---|---|---|---|
| 1 | (Switzerland) HC Davos | 4 | 3 | 0 | 1 | 0 | 12 | 6 | +6 | 10 | Advance to Playoffs | — | 0–1(OT) | 5–3 |
| 2 | (Sweden) Färjestad BK | 4 | 1 | 2 | 0 | 1 | 8 | 9 | −1 | 7 | Advance to Playoffs | 0–4 | — | 4–3(OT) |
| 3 | (Czech Republic) HC Pardubice | 4 | 0 | 0 | 1 | 3 | 10 | 15 | −5 | 1 | | 2–3 | 2–3 | — |

Source: championshockeyleague.net
Rules for classification: Group stage tiebreakers

=== Group F ===
| Pos | Team | Pld | W | OTW | OTL | L | GF | GA | GD | Pts | Qualification | LIT | BLU | GRE |
|---|---|---|---|---|---|---|---|---|---|---|---|---|---|---|
| 1 | (Czech Republic) HC Litvínov | 4 | 3 | 1 | 0 | 0 | 14 | 7 | +7 | 11 | Advance to Playoffs | — | 3–2(OT) | 6–4 |
| 2 | (Finland) Espoo Blues | 4 | 1 | 0 | 1 | 2 | 7 | 8 | −1 | 4 | Advance to Playoffs | 0–1 | — | 4–2 |
| 3 | (France) Grenoble | 4 | 1 | 0 | 0 | 3 | 9 | 15 | −6 | 3 | | 1–4 | 2–1 | — |

Source: championshockeyleague.net
Rules for classification: Group stage tiebreakers

=== Group G ===
| Pos | Team | Pld | W | OTW | OTL | L | GF | GA | GD | Pts | Qualification | TPS | DEG | BWL |
|---|---|---|---|---|---|---|---|---|---|---|---|---|---|---|
| 1 | (Finland) TPS | 4 | 2 | 1 | 1 | 0 | 15 | 9 | +6 | 9 | Advance to Playoffs | — | 1–2(SO) | 6–1 |
| 2 | (Germany) Düsseldorfer EG | 4 | 1 | 1 | 0 | 2 | 15 | 14 | +1 | 5 | Advance to Playoffs | 4–5 | — | 6–3 |
| 3 | (Austria) Black Wings Linz | 4 | 1 | 0 | 1 | 2 | 11 | 18 | −7 | 4 | | 2–3(OT) | 5–3 | — |

Source: championshockeyleague.net
Rules for classification: Group stage tiebreakers

=== Group H ===
| Pos | Team | Pld | W | OTW | OTL | L | GF | GA | GD | Pts | Qualification | RBM | KOS | KAC |
|---|---|---|---|---|---|---|---|---|---|---|---|---|---|---|
| 1 | (Germany) Red Bull Munich | 4 | 4 | 0 | 0 | 0 | 15 | 4 | +11 | 12 | Advance to Playoffs | — | 1–0 | 6–1 |
| 2 | (Slovakia) HC Košice | 4 | 1 | 1 | 0 | 2 | 7 | 8 | −1 | 5 | Advance to Playoffs | 2–4 | — | 2–1(SO) |
| 3 | (Austria) KAC Klagenfurt | 4 | 0 | 0 | 1 | 3 | 5 | 15 | −10 | 1 | | 1–4 | 2–3 | — |

Source: championshockeyleague.net
Rules for classification: Group stage tiebreakers

=== Group I ===
| Pos | Team | Pld | W | OTW | OTL | L | GF | GA | GD | Pts | Qualification | MAN | VIT | NEM |
|---|---|---|---|---|---|---|---|---|---|---|---|---|---|---|
| 1 | (Germany) Adler Mannheim | 4 | 2 | 1 | 0 | 1 | 6 | 5 | +1 | 8 | Advance to Playoffs | — | 2–1(SO) | 2–1 |
| 2 | (Czech Republic) Vítkovice Steel | 4 | 2 | 0 | 1 | 1 | 7 | 5 | +2 | 7 | Advance to Playoffs | 1–2 | — | 3–1 |
| 3 | (Belarus) Neman Grodno | 4 | 1 | 0 | 0 | 3 | 4 | 7 | −3 | 3 | | 2–0 | 0–2 | — |

Source: championshockeyleague.net
Rules for classification: Group stage tiebreakers

=== Group J ===
| Pos | Team | Pld | W | OTW | OTL | L | GF | GA | GD | Pts | Qualification | KÄR | VIC | KRE |
|---|---|---|---|---|---|---|---|---|---|---|---|---|---|---|
| 1 | (Finland) Kärpät | 4 | 4 | 0 | 0 | 0 | 12 | 1 | +11 | 12 | Advance to Playoffs | — | 4–0 | 4–1 |
| 2 | (Austria) Vienna Capitals | 4 | 1 | 0 | 1 | 2 | 8 | 14 | −6 | 4 | Advance to Playoffs | 0–2 | — | 2–3(SO) |
| 3 | (Germany) Krefeld Pinguine | 4 | 0 | 1 | 0 | 3 | 9 | 14 | −5 | 2 | | 0–2 | 5–6 | — |

Source: championshockeyleague.net
Rules for classification: Group stage tiebreakers

=== Group K ===
| Pos | Team | Pld | W | OTW | OTL | L | GF | GA | GD | Pts | Qualification | LHF | LUK | FRI |
|---|---|---|---|---|---|---|---|---|---|---|---|---|---|---|
| 1 | (Sweden) Luleå HF | 4 | 2 | 1 | 0 | 1 | 14 | 9 | +5 | 8 | Advance to Playoffs | — | 4–3(SO) | 4–2 |
| 2 | (Finland) Lukko | 4 | 1 | 1 | 1 | 1 | 11 | 12 | −1 | 6 | Advance to Playoffs | 0–3 | — | 4–2 |
| 3 | (Switzerland) Fribourg-Gottéron | 4 | 1 | 0 | 1 | 2 | 11 | 15 | −4 | 4 | | 4–3 | 3–4(SO) | — |

Source: championshockeyleague.net
Rules for classification: Group stage tiebreakers

=== Group L ===
| Pos | Team | Pld | W | OTW | OTL | L | GF | GA | GD | Pts | Qualification | OIL | TRI | KAL |
|---|---|---|---|---|---|---|---|---|---|---|---|---|---|---|
| 1 | (Norway) Stavanger Oilers | 4 | 2 | 0 | 1 | 1 | 11 | 7 | +4 | 7 | Advance to Playoffs | — | 4–1 | 3–0 |
| 2 | (Czech Republic) Oceláři Třinec | 4 | 1 | 1 | 1 | 1 | 14 | 11 | +3 | 6 | Advance to Playoffs | 4–3(OT) | — | 6–0 |
| 3 | (Finland) KalPa | 4 | 1 | 1 | 0 | 2 | 6 | 13 | −7 | 5 | | 2–1 | 4–3(SO) | — |

Source: championshockeyleague.net
Rules for classification: Group stage tiebreakers

=== Group M ===
| Pos | Team | Pld | W | OTW | OTL | L | GF | GA | GD | Pts | Qualification | STO | SPA | GEN |
|---|---|---|---|---|---|---|---|---|---|---|---|---|---|---|
| 1 | (Norway) Storhamar Ishockey | 4 | 3 | 0 | 0 | 1 | 10 | 5 | +5 | 9 | Advance to Playoffs | — | 2–3 | 5–1 |
| 2 | (Czech Republic) HC Sparta Praha | 4 | 2 | 0 | 1 | 1 | 12 | 10 | +2 | 7 | Advance to Playoffs | 1–2 | — | 5–2 |
| 3 | (Switzerland) Genève-Servette | 4 | 0 | 1 | 0 | 3 | 7 | 16 | −9 | 2 | | 0–3 | 4–3(OT) | — |

Source: championshockeyleague.net
Rules for classification: Group stage tiebreakers

=== Group N ===
| Pos | Team | Pld | W | OTW | OTL | L | GF | GA | GD | Pts | Qualification | FHC | JYP | SHE |
|---|---|---|---|---|---|---|---|---|---|---|---|---|---|---|
| 1 | (Sweden) Frölunda HC | 4 | 4 | 0 | 0 | 0 | 20 | 5 | +15 | 12 | Advance to Playoffs | — | 3–2 | 9–1 |
| 2 | (Finland) JYP | 4 | 2 | 0 | 0 | 2 | 10 | 9 | +1 | 6 | Advance to Playoffs | 1–4 | — | 3–0 |
| 3 | (United Kingdom) Sheffield Steelers | 4 | 0 | 0 | 0 | 4 | 4 | 20 | −16 | 0 | | 1–4 | 2–4 | — |

Source: championshockeyleague.net
Rules for classification: Group stage tiebreakers

=== Group O ===
| Pos | Team | Pld | W | OTW | OTL | L | GF | GA | GD | Pts | Qualification | VLH | ING | BRA |
|---|---|---|---|---|---|---|---|---|---|---|---|---|---|---|
| 1 | (Sweden) Växjö Lakers | 4 | 3 | 0 | 0 | 1 | 20 | 10 | +10 | 9 | Advance to Playoffs | — | 4–2 | 10–2 |
| 2 | (Germany) ERC Ingolstadt | 4 | 2 | 0 | 0 | 2 | 16 | 15 | +1 | 6 | Advance to Playoffs | 5–3 | — | 5–2 |
| 3 | (United Kingdom) Braehead Clan | 4 | 1 | 0 | 0 | 3 | 11 | 22 | −11 | 3 | | 1–3 | 6–4 | — |

Source: championshockeyleague.net
Rules for classification: Group stage tiebreakers

=== Group P ===
| Pos | Team | Pld | W | OTW | OTL | L | GF | GA | GD | Pts | Qualification | ZSC | BER | GAP |
|---|---|---|---|---|---|---|---|---|---|---|---|---|---|---|
| 1 | (Switzerland) ZSC Lions | 4 | 4 | 0 | 0 | 0 | 20 | 10 | +10 | 12 | Advance to Playoffs | — | 3–2 | 6–1 |
| 2 | (Germany) Eisbären Berlin | 4 | 1 | 0 | 0 | 3 | 12 | 13 | −1 | 3 | Advance to Playoffs | 3–6 | — | 6–1 |
| 3 | (France) Rapaces de Gap | 4 | 1 | 0 | 0 | 3 | 9 | 18 | −9 | 3 | | 4–5 | 3–1 | — |

Source: championshockeyleague.net
Rules for classification: Group stage tiebreakers

== Playoffs ==
In the playoffs, the teams played against each other over two legs on a home-and-away basis with the team with the better standing after the group stage having the second game at home, except for the one-game final played at the venue of the team with the best competition track record leading up to the final.

The mechanism of the draw for playoffs were as follows:

- The entire playoff was drawn at a single occasion on 8 September 2015 to determine the sixteen pairings for the Round of 32. After the draw, all games up to the final were set in brackets.
- In the draw for the Round of 32, the 16 group winners were seeded, and the 16 runners-up were unseeded. The seeded teams were drawn against the unseeded teams, with the seeded teams hosting the second leg. Teams from the same group could not be drawn against each other.

=== Playoff teams ===
| Group | Winners (Seeded in round of 32 draw) | Runners-up (Unseeded in round of 32 draw) |
|---|---|---|
| A | (Sweden) Linköpings HC | (Finland) HIFK |
| B | (Finland) Tappara | (Sweden) Djurgårdens IF |
| C | (Sweden) HV71 | (Austria) Red Bull Salzburg |
| D | (Sweden) Skellefteå AIK | (Czech Republic) Bílí Tygři Liberec |
| E | (Switzerland) HC Davos | (Sweden) Färjestad BK |
| F | (Czech Republic) HC Litvínov | (Finland) Espoo Blues |
| G | (Finland) TPS | (Germany) Düsseldorfer EG |
| H | (Germany) Red Bull Munich | (Slovakia) HC Košice |
| I | (Germany) Adler Mannheim | (Czech Republic) Vítkovice Steel |
| J | (Finland) Kärpät | (Austria) Vienna Capitals |
| K | (Sweden) Luleå HF | (Finland) Lukko |
| L | (Norway) Stavanger Oilers | (Czech Republic) Oceláři Třinec |
| M | (Norway) Storhamar Ishockey | (Czech Republic) HC Sparta Praha |
| N | (Sweden) Frölunda HC | (Finland) JYP |
| O | (Sweden) Växjö Lakers | (Germany) ERC Ingolstadt |
| P | (Switzerland) ZSC Lions | (Germany) Eisbären Berlin |

=== Bracket ===
Round of 32
(Czech Republic) Oceláři Třinec | 2 | 1 | 3
(Sweden) HV71 | 2 | 3 | 5
(Finland) Espoo Blues | 4 | 2 | 6
(Germany) Adler Mannheim | 1 | 3 | 4
(Czech Republic) HC Sparta Praha | 3 | 3 | 6
(Switzerland) ZSC Lions | 2 | 0 | 2
(Germany) Düsseldorfer EG | 0 | 0 | 0
(Finland) Kärpät | 2 | 3 | 5
(Austria) Red Bull Salzburg | 1 | 2 | 3
(Norway) Storhamar Ishockey | 3 | 3 | 6
(Finland) JYP | 2 | 1 | 3
(Finland) TPS | 2 | 4 | 6
(Finland) Lukko | 5 | 3 | 8
(Germany) Red Bull Munich | 3 | 0 | 3
(Sweden) Djurgårdens IF | 4 | 3 | 7
(Sweden) Växjö Lakers | 3 | 3 | 6
(Czech Republic) Bílí Tygři Liberec | 4 | 6 | 10
(Sweden) Linköpings HC | 1 | 3 | 4
(Finland) HIFK | 2 | 2 | 4
(Switzerland) HC Davos | 1 | 5 | 6
(Germany) Eisbären Berlin | 3 | 3 | 6
(Norway) Stavanger Oilers | 0 | 3 | 3
(Slovakia) HC Košice | 4 | 0 | 4
(Sweden) Skellefteå AIK | 3 | 3 | 6
(Germany) ERC Ingolstadt | 4 | 1 | 5
(Sweden) Frölunda HC (OT) | 2 | 4 | 6
(Austria) Vienna Capitals | 3 | 2 | 5
(Czech Republic) HC Litvínov (OT) | 4 | 2 | 6
(Czech Republic) Vítkovice Steel | 0 | 1 | 1
(Finland) Tappara | 2 | 2 | 4
(Sweden) Färjestad BK | 0 | 3 | 3
(Sweden) Luleå HF | 3 | 1 | 4

Round of 16
(Finland) Espoo Blues | 3 | 1 | 4
(Sweden) HV71 | 1 | 1 | 2
(Czech Republic) HC Sparta Praha | 4 | 1 | 5
(Finland) Kärpät | 2 | 4 | 6
(Finland) TPS | 4 | 2 | 6
(Norway) Storhamar Ishockey | 3 | 1 | 4
(Sweden) Djurgårdens IF | 1 | 1 | 2
(Finland) Lukko | 2 | 2 | 4
(Czech Republic) Bílí Tygři Liberec | 3 | 3 | 6
(Switzerland) HC Davos | 5 | 4 | 9
(Germany) Eisbären Berlin | 2 | 1 | 3
(Sweden) Skellefteå AIK | 5 | 2 | 7
(Czech Republic) HC Litvínov | 2 | 0 | 2
(Sweden) Frölunda HC | 1 | 6 | 7
(Finland) Tappara | 2 | 0 | 2
(Sweden) Luleå HF | 1 | 5 | 6

Quarter-finals
(Finland) Espoo Blues | 2 | 1 | 3
(Finland) Kärpät | 0 | 5 | 5
(Finland) TPS | 3 | 1 | 4(0)
(Finland) Lukko (SO) | 3 | 1 | 4(1)
(Switzerland) HC Davos | 1 | 4 | 5
(Sweden) Skellefteå AIK | 1 | 1 | 2
(Sweden) Luleå HF | 3 | 4 | 7(1)
(Sweden) Frölunda HC (SO) | 2 | 5 | 7(3)

Semi-finals
(Finland) Lukko | 2 | 2 | 4
(Finland) Kärpät | 3 | 2 | 5
(Switzerland) HC Davos | 0 | 1 | 1
(Sweden) Frölunda HC | 5 | 1 | 6

Final
(Finland) Kärpät | 1
(Sweden) Frölunda HC | 2

Note:

1. The teams listed on top of each tie play first game at home and the bottom team plays second game at home.
2. The order of the legs (what team starts at home) in the future rounds may be changed as the team with best record should have second game at home.

=== Round of 32 ===
The draw for the entire playoff (round of 32, round of 16, quarter-finals, semi-finals and final) was held on 8 September 2015. The first legs were played on 22 and 29 September, and the second legs were played on 6 October 2015. The seeded teams (group winners) played the last game at home.

| Team 1 | Agg. | Team 2 | 1st leg | 2nd leg |
|---|---|---|---|---|
| Oceláři Třinec (Czech Republic) | 3–5 | (Sweden) HV71 | 2–2 | 1–3 |
| Bílí Tygři Liberec (Czech Republic) | 10–4 | (Sweden) Linköpings HC | 4–1 | 6–3 |
| Espoo Blues (Finland) | 6–4 | (Germany) Adler Mannheim | 4–1 | 2–3 |
| HIFK (Finland) | 4–6 | (Switzerland) HC Davos | 2–1 | 2–5 |
| HC Sparta Praha (Czech Republic) | 6–2 | (Switzerland) ZSC Lions | 3–2 | 3–0 |
| Eisbären Berlin (Germany) | 6–3 | (Norway) Stavanger Oilers | 3–0 | 3–3 |
| Düsseldorfer EG (Germany) | 0–5 | (Finland) Kärpät | 0–2 | 0–3 |
| HC Košice (Slovakia) | 4–6 | (Sweden) Skellefteå AIK | 4–3 | 0–3 |
| Red Bull Salzburg (Austria) | 3–6 | (Norway) Storhamar Ishockey | 1–3 | 2–3 |
| ERC Ingolstadt (Germany) | 5–6 | (Sweden) Frölunda HC | 4–2 | 1–4 (OT) |
| JYP (Finland) | 3–6 | (Finland) TPS | 2–2 | 1–4 |
| Vienna Capitals (Austria) | 5–6 | (Czech Republic) HC Litvínov | 3–4 | 2–2 (OT) |
| Lukko (Finland) | 8–3 | (Germany) Red Bull Munich | 5–3 | 3–0 |
| Vítkovice Steel (Czech Republic) | 1–4 | (Finland) Tappara | 0–2 | 1–2 |
| Djurgårdens IF (Sweden) | 7–6 | (Sweden) Växjö Lakers | 4–3 | 3–3 |
| Färjestad BK (Sweden) | 3–4 | (Sweden) Luleå HF | 0–3 | 3–1 |

==== First Leg ====
| 22 September 2015; 16:00 | Vítkovice Steel (Czech Republic) | 0–2 (0–0, 0–2, 0–0) | (Finland) Tappara | ČEZ Aréna, Ostrava; Attendance: 4,057 |

Game reference
| Daniel Dolejš | Goalies | Mika Noronen | Referees: René Hradil; Daniel Konc; Linesmen: Jiří Gebauer; Vít Lederer |
| 0–1 / 24:17 – Aalto (Savinainen, Kuusela); 0–2 / 25:49 – (PS) Peltola | | | Referees: René Hradil; Daniel Konc; Linesmen: Jiří Gebauer; Vít Lederer |
| 4 min | Penalties | 14 min | Referees: René Hradil; Daniel Konc; Linesmen: Jiří Gebauer; Vít Lederer |

| 22 September 2015; 16:30 | Bílí Tygři Liberec (Czech Republic) | 4–1 (4–1, 0–0, 0–0) | (Sweden) Linköpings HC | Home Credit Arena, Liberec; Attendance: 1,993 |

Game reference

Marek Schwarz
Goalies
Marcus Högberg
Referees:
Ladislav Smetana
Petr Úlehla
Linesmen:
Miroslav Lhotský
Kamil Zavřel

| Bulíř (Derner, Vitásek) – 3:14 | 1–0 |
| Bulíř (Šimek) (PP) – 6:37 | 2–0 |
| | 2–1 | 14:40 – Junland (Little, Persson) |
| Bulíř – 14:51 | 3–1 |
| Řepík (Jonák – 16:40 | 4–1 |

| 22 September 2015; 16:30 | Oceláři Třinec (Czech Republic) | 2–2 (1–1, 1–1, 0–0) | (Sweden) HV71 | Werk Arena, Třinec; Attendance: 2,112 |

Game reference

Peter Hamerlík
Goalies
Erik Ersberg
Referees:
Andris Ansons
Robin Šír
Linesmen:
Jiří Frodl
Jiří Ondráček

| Matuš – 8:16 | 1–0 |
| | 1–1 | 14:24 – (PP) Laine (Hansson) |
| | 1–2 | 31:56 – Sundh (Sandberg, Andersson) |
| Hrňa (Kreps) – 37:16 | 2–2 |

58 min
Penalties
35 min

| 22 September 2015; 16:30 | HIFK (Finland) | 2–1 (1–0, 0–0, 1–1) | (Switzerland) HC Davos | Helsinki Ice Hall, Helsinki; Attendance: 3,649 |

Game reference

Ville Husso
Goalies
Leonardo Genoni

| Rask (Luttinen, Taimi) (PP) – 9:24 | 1–0 |
| | 1–1 | 44:16 – Wieser (Axelsson) |
| Rask (Ramstedt, Luttinen) (PP)) – 46:44 | 2–1 |

| 22 September 2015; 16:30 | JYP (Finland) | 2–2 (0–0, 2–0, 0–2) | (Finland) TPS | Synergia-areena, Jyväskylä; Attendance: 2,045 |

Game reference

Tuomas Tarkki
Goalies
Teemu Lassila
Referees:
Jukka Hakkarainen
Sören Persson
Linesmen:
Pasi Nieminen
Daniel Österholm

| Salmio (Kalteva, Boyce) – 31:13 | 1–0 |
| Hubáček (Tuppurainen, Pulli) – 33:29 | 2–0 |
| | 2–1 | 46:16 – (PP) Nummelin (Tikkanen, Spina) |
| | 2–2 | 46:53 – Eronen (Tukonen, Perrin) |

6 min
Penalties
6 min

| 22 September 2015; 16:30 | Lukko (Finland) | 5–3 (1–0, 3–1, 1–2) | (Germany) Red Bull Munich | Kivikylän Areena, Rauma; Attendance: 1,716 |

Game reference

Danny aus den Birken
Goalies
Rasmus Rinne
Referees:
Mikko Kaukokari
Maxim Sidorenko
Linesmen:
Markus Hagerström
Hannu Sormunen

| Riska (Koivisto) (SHG) – 19:59 | 1–0 |
| | 1–1 | 20:49 – (PP) Wolf (Regehr, Boyle) |
| Lahti (Lähteenmäki, Niskala) (PP) – 29:37 | 2–1 |
| Niskala (Koivisto, Lahti) (PP) – 32:03 | 3–1 |
| Koivisto (Lahti, Niskala) – 35:04 | 4–1 |
| Lähteenmäki (Ahonen, Lahti) – 47:50 | 5–1 |
| | 5–2 | 58:23 – Sparre (Pinizzotto, Aucoin) |
| | 5–3 | 59:14 – Kettemer (Kahun) |

10 min
Penalties
10 min

| 22 September 2015; 16:30 | Espoo Blues (Finland) | 4–1 (1–1, 3–0, 0–0) | (Germany) Adler Mannheim | Espoo Metro Areena, Espoo; Attendance: 1,183 |

Game reference

Christian Engstrand
Goalies
Dennis Endras
Referees:
Timo Metsala
Marc Wiegand
Linesmen:
Jani Pesonen
Joonas Saha

| Kantola (Rantakari, Hirschovits) (PP) – 9:02 | 1–0 |
| | 1–1 | 10:34 – (PP) Yip (Hecht, Bittner) |
| Hirschovits (Poukkula) – 20:30 | 2–1 |
| Makkonen (PP) – 29:37 | 3–1 |
| Poukkula (Korhonen, Hirschovits) – 39:08 | 4–1 |

14 min
Penalties
24 min

| 22 September 2015; 17:00 | HC Košice (Slovakia) | 4–3 (0–1, 1–1, 3–1) | (Sweden) Skellefteå AIK | Steel Aréna, Košice; Attendance: 5,038 |

Game reference

Marcel Melicherčík
Goalies
Erik Hanses (pulled at 5:20, back in at 5:44) Markus Svensson (pulled at 5:44)
Referees:
Jozef Kubuš
Milan Zrnić
Linesmen:
Martin Korba
Peter Šefčík

| | 0–1 | 10:42 – Pesonen (Lindholm) |
| | 0–2 | 22:24 – (PP) Zackrisson (Holmström) |
| Bartánus (Suja) (PP) – 23:56 | 1–2 |
| Bartánus (Bicek, Šedivý) – 50:35 | 2–2 |
| | 2–3 | 54:10 – Urbom (Pettersson) |
| Lelkeš – 56:14 | 3–3 |
| Lapšanský (Jenčík, Bartoš) – 57:13 | 4–3 |

8 min
Penalties
10 min

| 22 September 2015; 17:30 | HC Sparta Praha (Czech Republic) | 3–2 (1–0, 2–1, 0–1) | (Switzerland) ZSC Lions | O2 Arena, Prague; Attendance: 2,893 |

Game reference

Tomáš Pöpperle
Goalies
Lukas Flüeler
Referees:
Martin Fraňo
Daniel Piechaczek
Linesmen:
Tomáš Brejcha
Libor Suchánek

| Buchtele (Réway, Přibyl) – 9:07 | 1–0 |
| Buchtele (Réway, Glenn) – 24:41 | 2–0 |
| Glenn (Sabolič, Pech) (PP) – 26:05 | 3–0 |
| | 3–1 | 30:43 – Herzog (Baltisberger, Matthews) |
| | 3–2 | 44:14 – Foucault (Keller, Shannon) |

2 min
Penalties
8 min

| 22 September 2015; 18:00 | Färjestad BK (Sweden) | 0–3 (0–0, 0–2, 0–1) | (Sweden) Luleå HF | Lofbergs Arena, Karlstad; Attendance: 1,594 |

Game reference

Justin Pogge
Goalies
Daniel Larsson
Referees:
Mikael Holm
Danny Kurmann
Linesman:
Tobias Haster

| 0–1 | 21:19 – Mikkelson |
| 0–2 | 37:57 – Rajala (Melart, Ekarv) |
| 0–3 | 47:52 – Harju (Ekarv, Rajala) |

8 min
Penalties
6 min

| 22 September 2015; 18:15 | Vienna Capitals (Austria) | 3–4 (1–4, 1–0, 1–0) | (Czech Republic) HC Litvínov | Albert Schultz Eishalle, Vienna; Attendance: 2,400 |

Game reference

David Kickert (pulled at 9:16, back at 20:00) Phillip Zopf (pulled at 20:00)
Goalies
Michael Petrásek
Referees:
Vladimír Baluška
Peter Gebei
Linesmen:
Attila Nagy
Martin Smeibidlo

| | 0–1 | 1:07 – Hanzl (Martynek, Trávníček) |
| Grosslercher (Schiechl, Hartl) – 5:12 | 1–1 |
| | 1–2 | 9:16 – Lukeš (Hübl) |
| | 1–3 | 18:01 – (PP) Jánský (Hübl, Lukeš) |
| | 1–4 | 18:16 – Chaloupka (Hořava) |
| Rotter (Milam, Iberer) (PP) – 39:04 | 2–4 |
| McLean (Whitmore, Milam) – 41:56 | 3–4 |

10 min
Penalties
14 min

| 22 September 2015; 18:15 | Red Bull Salzburg (Austria) | 1–3 (0–0, 0–2, 1–1) | (Norway) Storhamar Ishockey | Eisarena Salzburg, Salzburg; Attendance: 1,206 |

Game reference

Fabian Weinhandl
Goalies
Oskar Östlund
Referees:
Stephan Bauer
Trpimir Piragić
Linesmen:
Matjaž Hribar
Michael Johnstone

| | 0–1 | 28:44 – (SHG) Berglund (Gustafsson) |
| | 0–2 | 38:42 – (PP) Larrivée (Hotham, Jensen) |
| Beach (Connelly) – 48:30 | 1–2 |
| | 1–3 | 56:47 – Reichenberg |

4 min
Penalties
12 min

| 22 September 2015; 18:30 | Eisbären Berlin (Germany) | 3–0 (0–0, 1–0, 2–0) | (Norway) Stavanger Oilers | O2 World, Berlin; Attendance: 4,069 |

Game reference

Petri Vehanen
Goalies
Henrik Holm
Referees:
Vladimír Pešina
Gordon Schukies
Linesmen:
Marcus Hofer
Kevin Salewski

| Talbot (Mulock, Hördler) (PP) – 37:09 | 1–0 |
| Ziegler (Kuji) – 42:44 | 2–0 |
| DuPont (Olver) (PP) – 53:19 | 3–0 |

12 min
Penalties
22 min

| 22 September 2015; 18:30 | Düsseldorfer EG (Germany) | 0–2 (0–1, 0–1, 0–0) | (Finland) Kärpät | ISS Dome, Düsseldorf; Attendance: 5,431 |

Game reference
| Robert Goepfert | Goalies | Sami Aittokallio | Referees: Manuel Nikolić; Marian Rohatsch; Linesmen: Andreas Kowert; Robert Schelewski |
| 0–1 / 14:54 – Aho (Aaltonen, Niemelä); 0–2 / 20:51 – (PP) Pirnes (Huml, Pyörälä) | | | Referees: Manuel Nikolić; Marian Rohatsch; Linesmen: Andreas Kowert; Robert Schelewski |
| 12 min | Penalties | 16 min | Referees: Manuel Nikolić; Marian Rohatsch; Linesmen: Andreas Kowert; Robert Schelewski |

| 22 September 2015; 19:00 | Djurgårdens IF (Sweden) | 4–3 (2–1, 1–0, 1–2) | (Sweden) Växjö Lakers | Hovet, Stockholm; Attendance: 566 |

Game reference

Mantas Armalis
Goalies
Stefan Steen
Referees:
Linus Öhlund
Jari-Pekka Pajula
Linesmen:
Jimmy Dahmén
Emil Wernström

| Sörensen (Hultström) (PP) – 5:59 | 1–0 |
| Ljungh (Alvarez) – 14:03 | 2–0 |
| | 2–1 | 14:15 – Hennessy (Kiiskinen) |
| Brodin (Alvarez, Ljungh) (PP) – 34:59 | 3–1 |
| | 3–2 | 44:42 – Josefsson (Reddox) |
| Forsberg (Brodin, Anderson) – 45:01 | 4–2 |
| | 4–3 | 47:20 – Hillding (Reddox) |

14 min
Penalties
6 min

| 29 September 2015; 18:30 | ERC Ingolstadt (Germany) | 4–2 (1–2, 2–0, 1–0) | (Sweden) Frölunda HC | Saturn Arena, Ingolstadt; Attendance: 2,046 |

Game reference

Timo Pielmeier
Goalies
Johan Gustafsson
Referees:
Daniel Piechaczek
Jari Suorsa
Linesmen:
Vladislav Gossman
Lukas Kohlmüller

| | 0–1 | 1:15 – (PP) Lundqvist (Abbott, Lasch) |
| | 0–2 | 5:35 – Lehkonen (Bengtsson) |
| Barta (Kronthaler) – 11:35 | 1–2 |
| Irmen (Kubalík, Barta) (PP) – 31:14 | 2–2 |
| Ross (Irmen, Elsner) – 37:59 | 3–2 |
| Tatíček (Laliberte, Lebler) – 48:37 | 4–2 |

8 min
Penalties
6 min

==== Second Leg ====
| 6 October 2015; 16:00 | HC Litvínov (Czech Republic) | 2–2 (OT) (0–0, 0–0, 1–2) (OT 1–0) | (Austria) Vienna Capitals | Ivan Hlinka Stadion, Litvínov; Attendance: 2,084 |

Game reference

Lukáš Horák
Goalies
David Kickert
Referees:
Martin Fraňo
Marcus Vinnerborg
Linesmen:
Miroslav Lhotský
Josef Špůr

| | 0–1 | 45:30 – (PP) Rotter (Sharp) |
| Jánský (Pavlík) (PP) – 46:42 | 1–1 |
| | 1–2 | 50:46 – (SHG) Whitmore (Dzieduszycki, Milam) |
| Lukeš (Hübl) – 64:45 | 2–2 |

8 min
Penalties
16 min

HC Litvínov won 6–5 in Overtime on Aggregate.

| 6 October 2015; 16:30 | Skellefteå AIK (Sweden) | 3–0 (0–0, 1–0, 2–0) | (Slovakia) HC Košice | Skellefteå Kraft Arena, Skellefteå; Attendance: 2,209 |

Game reference

Markus Svensson
Goalies
Marcel Melicherčík
Referees:
Tobias Björk
Anssi Salonen
Linesmen:
Fredrik Altberg
Johannes Käck

| Pesonen (Pettersson, Ericsson) – 36:42 | 1–0 |
| Broadhurst (Lindholm, Aho) (PP) – 51:42 | 2–0 |
| Lindholm (Heed) (PP, ENG) – 59:56 | 3–0 |

4 min
Penalties
14 min

Skellefteå AIK won 6–4 on Aggregate.

| 6 October 2015; 16:30 | Tappara (Finland) | 2–1 (1–0, 1–1, 0–0) | (Czech Republic) Vítkovice Steel | Tampere Ice Stadium, Tampere; Attendance: 2,097 |

Game reference

Mika Noronen
Goalies
Daniel Dolejš
Referees:
Stefan Fonselius
Jacob Grumsen
Linesmen:
Jani Pesonen
Masi Puolakka

| Peltola (Saravo, Dixon) – 19:52 | 1–0 |
| | 1–1 | 27:58 – Olesz (Strapáč) |
| Järvinen (Kuusela, Aalto) (PP) – 36:55 | 2–1 |

8 min
Penalties
14 min

Tappara won 4–1 on Aggregate.

| 6 October 2015; 16:30 | TPS (Finland) | 4–1 (0–1, 2–0, 2–0) | (Finland) JYP | HK Areena, Turku; Attendance: 3,392 |

Game reference

Teemu Lassila
Goalies
Tuomas Tarkki
Referees:
Morgan Johansson
Jari-Pekka Pajula
Linesmen:
Daniel Österholm
Joonas Saha

| | 0–1 | 12:22 – (PP) Pihlman (Tavi, Löfman) |
| Spina (Perrin) – 24:12 | 1–1 |
| Spina (Kallio, Perrin) (PP) – 31:36 | 2–1 |
| Spina – 49:46 | 3–1 |
| Virta (Tikkanen, Mojžíš) – 53:04 | 4–1 |

4 min
Penalties
6 min

TPS won 6–3 on Aggregate.

| 6 October 2015; 16:30 | Kärpät (Finland) | 3–0 (3–0, 0–0, 0–0) | (Germany) Düsseldorfer EG | Oulun Energia Areena, Oulu; Attendance: 3,471 |

Game reference

Sami Aittokallio
Goalies
Mathias Niederberger
Referees:
Daniel Stricker
Jari Suorsa
Linesmen:
Henri Neva
Hannu Sormunen

| Aho – 1:36 | 1–0 |
| Mäenalanen (Keränen, Masuhr) – 5:02 | 2–0 |
| Nutivaara (Niemi) (PP) – 14:32 | 3–0 |

10 min
Penalties
27 min

Oulun Kärpät won 5–0 on Aggregate.

| 6 October 2015; 18:00 | HV71 (Sweden) | 3–1 (0–0, 1–1, 2–0) | (Czech Republic) Oceláři Třinec | Kinnarps Arena, Jönköping; Attendance: 1,114 |

Game reference

Erik Ersberg
Goalies
Peter Hamerlík
Referees:
Petri Lindqvist
Mikael Sjöqvist
Linesmen:
Henrik Pihlblad
Emil Wernström

| | 0–1 | 26:54 – Klepiš (Linhart) |
| Eidstedt (Sandberg) – 30:01 | 1–1 |
| Abbott (Almquist, Hansson) (PP) – 51:15 | 2–1 |
| Bengtsson (Laine) – 59:28 | 3–1 |

4 min
Penalties
6 min

HV71 won 5–3 on Aggregate.

| 6 October 2015; 18:00 | Linköpings HC (Sweden) | 3–6 (0–4, 2–1, 1–1) | (Czech Republic) Bílí Tygři Liberec | Saab Arena, Linköpings; Attendance: 1,565 |

Game reference

David Rautio (pulled at 8:59) Marcus Högberg
Goalies
Marek Schwarz
Referees:
Wolmer Edqvist
Per Gustav
Linesmen:
Örjan Åhlen
Jimmy Dahmén

| | 0–1 | 0:26 – Birner (Vampola, Řepík) |
| | 0–2 | 2:50 – Řepík (Derner, Vampola) |
| | 0–3 | 3:20 – Bulíř |
| | 0–4 | 8:59 – Jelínek (Stránský, Krenželok) |
| Little (Junland, Persson) (PP) – 20:54 | 1–4 |
| | 1–5 | 23:44 – Radivojevič (Bakoš, Bulíř) |
| Forsling (Fogström, Sörensen) – 39:28 | 2–5 |
| Little (PP) – 45:40 | 3–5 |
| | 3–6 | 56:33 – Řepík (Ulrych, Šimek) |

8 min
Penalties
33 min

Bílí Tygři Liberec won 10–4 on Aggregate.

| 6 October 2015; 18:00 | Växjö Lakers (Sweden) | 3–3 (0–1, 2–0, 1–2) | (Sweden) Djurgårdens IF | Vida Arena, Växjö; Attendance: 1,680 |

Game reference

Stefan Steen
Goalies
Mikael Tellqvist
Referees:
Mikael Holm
Jussi Leppanen
Linesmen:
Ludvig Lundgren
Andreas Malmqvist

| | 0–1 | 10:11 – (PP) Brodin (Sallinen, Press) |
| Heikkinen (Murphy, Rosén) (PP) – 31:34 | 1–1 |
| Heikkinen (Rosén) (PP) – 39:59 | 2–1 |
| | 2–2 | 42:21 – Eriksson (Hage) |
| | 2–3 | 43:52 – Anderson (Englund, Hultström) |
| Rosén (Fröberg, Kiiskinen) – 51:55 | 3–3 |

4 min
Penalties
6 min

Djurgårdens IF won 7–6 on Aggregate.

| 6 October 2015; 18:00 | Storhamar Ishockey (Norway) | 3–2 (1–0, 0–0, 2–2) | (Austria) Red Bull Salzburg | Hamar OL-Amfi, Hamar; Attendance: 4,281 |

Game reference

Oskar Östlund
Goalies
Luka Gracnar
Referees:
Robert Hallin
Marcus Linde
Linesmen:
Jon Kilian
Alexander Waldeijer

| Andersson (Berglund) (PP) – 10:39 | 1–0 |
| | 1–1 | 45:01 – Fahey (Komarek, Beach) |
| Berglund (Bull, Andersson) (PP) – 48:48 | 2–1 |
| | 2–2 | 56:36 – (PP, EA) Sterling (Hughes, Duncan) |
| Andersson (Berglund) (ENG) – 58:50 | 3–2 |

16 min
Penalties
24 min

Storhamar Hockey won 6–3 on Aggregate.

| 6 October 2015; 18:00 | Stavanger Oilers (Norway) | 3–3 (1–1, 2–2, 0–0) | (Germany) Eisbären Berlin | DNB Arena, Stavanger; Attendance: 3,678 |

Game reference

Henrik Holm
Goalies
Jens Baxmann
Referees:
Roy Stian
Aleksi Rantala
Linesmen:
Gjerdmund Bakli
Havar Dahl

| | 0–1 | 3:25 – (PP) Noebels (DuPont) |
| Fossen (Solberg) – 8:35 | 1–1 |
| | 1–2 | 22:55 – Braun (Ziegler) |
| Dahl-Andersen (Soares) (PP) – 28:54 | 2–2 |
| Kissel (Sveum, Bruneteau) – 31:21 | 3–2 |
| | 3–3 | 39:59 – Mulock |

8 min
Penalties
12 min

Eisbären Berlin won 6–3 on Aggregate.

| 6 October 2015; 18:00 | Frölunda HC (Sweden) | 4–1 (OT) (1–0, 0–1, 2–0) (OT 1–0) | (Germany) ERC Ingolstadt | Frölundaborg, Gothenburg; Attendance: 1,706 |

Game reference

Lars Johansson
Goalies
Timo Pielmeier
Referees:
Pehr Claesson
Danny Kurmann
Linesman:
Tobias Haster

| Widerström (Fantenberg, Rosseli Olsen) – 19:34 | 1–0 |
| | 1–1 | 33:46 – Barta (Kohl, Irmen) |
| Falth (Lehkonen, Carlsson) – 41:23 | 2–1 |
| Bengtsson (Johnson, Lundqvist) (EA) – 58:49 | 3–1 |
| Lasch (Bengtsson, Sundström) – 66:26 | 4–1 |

6 min
Penalties
6 min

Frölunda HC won 6–5 in Overtime on Aggregate.

| 6 October 2015; 18:30 | Adler Mannheim (Germany) | 3–2 (1–0, 1–1, 1–1) | (Finland) Espoo Blues | SAP Arena, Mannheim; Attendance: 5,571 |

Game reference

Dennis Endras
Goalies
Kaapo Kähkönen
Referees:
Marcus Brill
Robin Šír
Linesmen:
Eugen Berger
Markus Seessle

| Macmurchy (Yip, Hecht) (PP) – 15:46 | 1–0 |
| | 1–1 | 21:05 – Makkonen (Talaja, Rantakari) |
| Yip (Hecht) (PP) – 39:54 | 2–1 |
| MacMurchy (Carle, Metropolit) (SHG) – 59:24 | 3–1 |
| | 3–2 | 59:59 – (ENG) Korhonen |

18 min
Penalties
14 min

Espoo Blues won 6–4 on Aggregate.

| 6 October 2015; 18:30 | Red Bull Munich (Germany) | 0–3 (0–1, 0–0, 0–2) | (Finland) Lukko | Olympia Eishalle, Munich; Attendance: 1,970 |

Game reference

Danny aus den Birken
Goalies
Ryan Zapolski
Referees:
Stephan Bauer
Shane Warschaw
Linesmen:
Lukas Kohlmüller
Thorsten Lajoie

| 0–1 | 15:30 – (PP) Zajac (Vahalahti, Koivisto) |
| 0–2 | 42:48 – Koivistoinen |
| 0–3 | 57:22 – (ENG) Koivisto |

10 min
Penalties
10 min

Lukko won 8–3 on Aggregate.

| 6 October 2015; 18:45 | HC Davos (Switzerland) | 5–2 (1–1, 1–1, 3–0) | (Finland) HIFK | Vaillant Arena, Davos; Attendance: 4,145 |

Game reference

Leonardo Genoni
Goalies
Ville Husso
Referees:
Lars Bruggemann
Tobias Wehrli
Linesmen:
Roger Bürgi
Balazs Kovacs

| | 0–1 | 13:52 – (PP) Ikonen (Rask, Ramstedt) |
| Lindgren – 14:35 | 1–1 |
| Forster – 21:53 | 2–1 |
| | 2–2 | Elkins (Auvitu) – 31:50 |
| Lindgren – 41:13 | 3–2 |
| Simion (PP) – 58:50 | 4–2 |
| Sciaroni (Wieser, Walser) (ENG) – 59:19 | 5–2 |

10 min
Penalties
12 min

HC Davos won 6–4 on Aggregate.

| 6 October 2015; 18:45 | ZSC Lions (Switzerland) | 0–3 (0–1, 0–1, 0–1) | (Czech Republic) HC Sparta Praha | Hallenstadion, Zürich; Attendance: 4,563 |

Game reference

Urban Leimbacher
Goalies
Tomáš Pöpperle
Referees:
Bastian Haupt
Didier Massy
Linesmen:
Marc-Henri Progin
Simon Wust

| 0–1 | 11:25 – Netík (Přibyl) |
| 0–2 | 36:07 – Kumstát (Sabolič, Barinka) |
| 0–3 | 48:43 – Buchtele (Netík) |

6 min
Penalties
12 min

HC Sparta Praha won 6–2 on Aggregate.

| 6 October 2015; 19:00 | Luleå HF (Sweden) | 1–3 (0–1, 0–2, 1–0) | (Sweden) Färjestad BK | Coop Norrbotten Arena, Luleå; Attendance: 3,663 |

Game reference

Joel Lassinantti
Goalies
Lars Haugen
Referees:
Jan Hribik
Mikael Nord
Linesmen:
Jan Sandström
Emil Yletyienen

| | 0–1 | 9:23 – Ryno (Johansson, Nygren) |
| | 0–2 | 24:12 – Erixon (Asplund, Ryno) |
| | 0–3 | 32:20 – Ryno (Johansson, Haugen) |
| Mikkelson (Micflikier, Harju) – 48:58 | 1–3 |

12 min
Penalties
24 min

Luleå HF won 4–3 on Aggregate.

=== Round of 16 ===
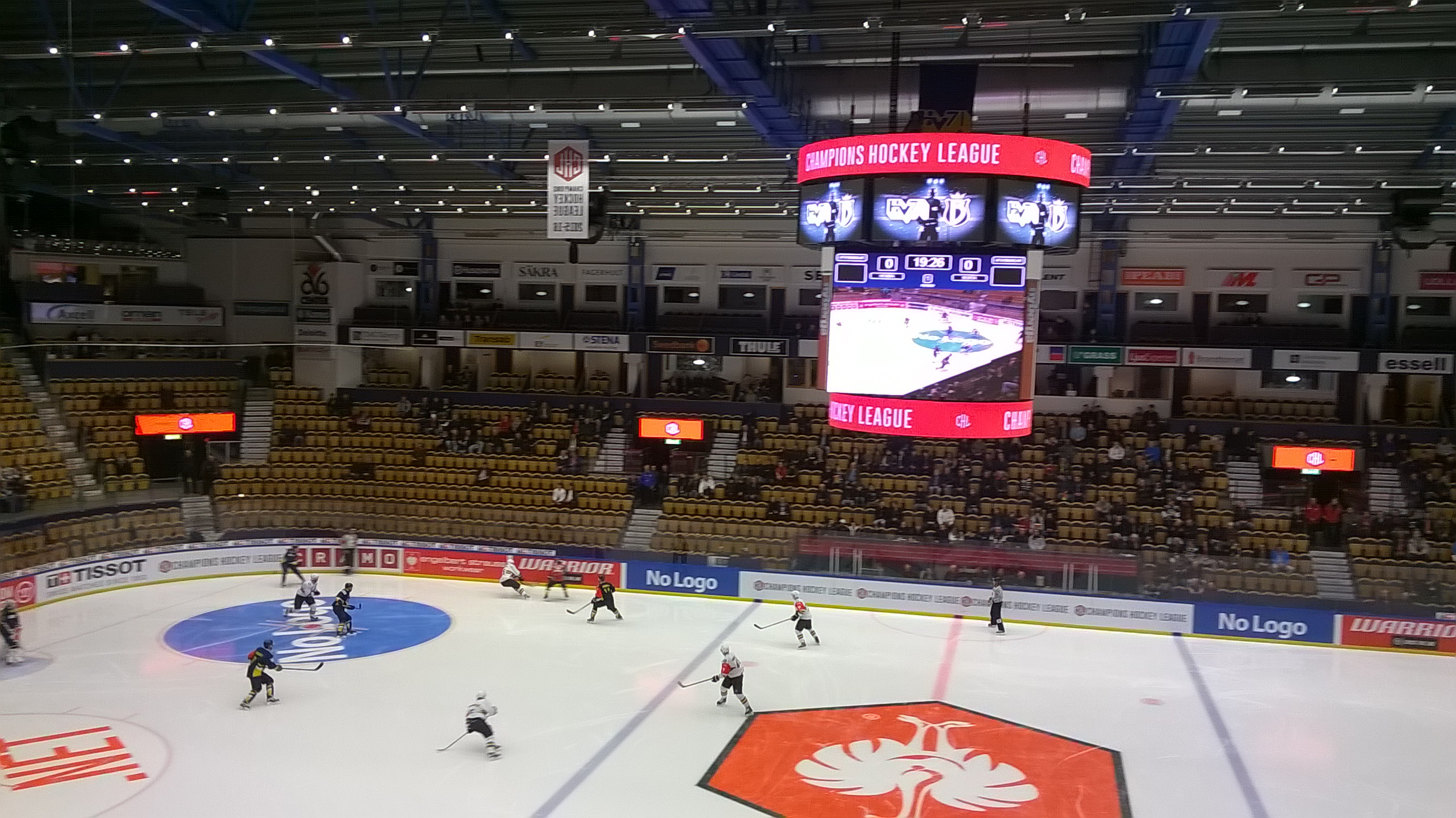
HV71 against Espoo Blues

The first legs were played on 3 November, and the second legs were played on 10 November 2015.

| Team 1 | Agg. | Team 2 | 1st leg | 2nd leg |
|---|---|---|---|---|
| Espoo Blues (Finland) | 4–2 | (Sweden) HV71 | 3–1 | 1–1 |
| HC Sparta Praha (Czech Republic) | 5–6 | (Finland) Kärpät | 4–2 | 1–4 |
| TPS (Finland) | 6–4 | (Norway) Storhamar Ishockey | 4–3 | 2–1 |
| Djurgårdens IF (Sweden) | 2–4 | (Finland) Lukko | 1–2 | 1–2 |
| Bílí Tygři Liberec (Czech Republic) | 6–9 | (Switzerland) HC Davos | 3–5 | 3–4 |
| Eisbären Berlin (Germany) | 3–7 | (Sweden) Skellefteå AIK | 2–5 | 1–2 |
| HC Litvínov (Czech Republic) | 2–7 | (Sweden) Frölunda HC | 2–1 | 0–6 |
| Tappara (Finland) | 2–6 | (Sweden) Luleå HF | 2–1 | 0–5 |

==== First Leg ====
| 3 November 2015; 16:00 | HC Litvínov (Czech Republic) | 2–1 (0–0, 1–0, 1–1) | (Sweden) Frölunda HC | Ivan Hlinka Stadion, Litvínov; Attendance: 1,125 |

Game reference

Michael Petrásek
Goalies
Lars Johansson

| Kubát (Jurčík) – 32:08 | 1–0 |
| | 1–1 | 41:50 – (PP) Johnson (Lasch) |
| Hanzl (Trávníček) (PP) – 45:46 | 2–1 |

6 min
Penalties
2 min

| 3 November 2015; 16:30 | TPS (Finland) | 4–3 (0–3, 3–0, 1–0) | (Norway) Storhamar Ishockey | HK Areena, Turku; Attendance: 4,238 |

Game reference

Teemu Lassila
Goalies
Oskar Östlund

| | 0–1 | 12:56 – Skadsdammen (Jensen) |
| | 0–2 | 16:21 – (PP, 5 ON 3) Zettergren (Bull) |
| | 0–3 | 19:15 – Rønnild (Huse, Hesbråten) |
| Ahtola (Nummelin, Virta) – 27:19 | 1–3 |
| Nummelin (Virta, Perrin) (PP 5 ON 3) – 30:34 | 2–3 |
| Siiki (Nummelin, Vainiola) – 34:06 | 3–3 |
| Pikkarainen (Vainiola, Tikkanen) – 55:21 | 4–3 |

16 min
Penalties
6 min

| 3 November 2015; 16:30 | Espoo Blues (Finland) | 3–1 (2–0, 1–1, 0–0) | (Sweden) HV71 | Espoo Metro Areena, Espoo; Attendance: 3,045 |

Game reference

Christian Engstrand
Goalies
Fredrik Pettersson Wentzel

| Sailio (SHG) – 8:57 | 1–0 |
| Somervuori (Makkonen, Korhonen) (PP) – 12:45 | 2–0 |
| | 2–1 | 20:57 – Önerud (Laine, Almquist) |
| Hirschovits (Somervuori, Rantakari) – 39:00 | 3–1 |

10 min
Penalties
10 min

| 3 November 2015; 16:30 | Tappara (Finland) | 2–1 (1–0, 0–0, 1–1) | (Sweden) Luleå HF | Tampere Ice Stadium, Tampere; Attendance: 3,903 |

Game reference

Tomi Karhunen
Goalies
Daniel Larsson

| Rauhala (Bonsaksen, Heikkilä) – 17:48 | 1–0 |
| | 1–1 | 46:10 – Mastomäki (Forsberg, Fabricius) |
| Lajunen (Kuusela, Haapala) | 2–1 |

4 min
Penalties
4 min

| 3 November 2015; 17:00 | Bílí Tygři Liberec (Czech Republic) | 3–5 (1–3, 1–1, 1–1) | (Switzerland) HC Davos | Tipsport Arena, Liberec; Attendance: 7,148 |

Game reference

Marek Schwarz
Goalies
Leonardo Genoni

| | 0–1 | 6:09 – Ambühl (Wieser) |
| | 0–2 | 9:16 – Simion (Brejčák) |
| Radivojevič (Bakoš) – 14:24 | 1–2 |
| | 1–3 | 18:17 – Wieser (Ambühl) |
| | 1–4 | 28:08 – (PP) Paulsson (Lindgren) |
| Radivojevič – 35:38 | 2–4 |
| | 2–5 | 57:59 – Ambühl (Axelsson) |
| Řepík (Vitásek, Derner) – 59:20 | 3–5 |

6 min
Penalties
6 min

| 3 November 2015; 17:30 | HC Sparta Praha (Czech Republic) | 4–2 (0–1, 2–0, 2–1) | (Finland) Kärpät | O2 Arena, Prague; Attendance: 4,593 |

Game reference

Tomáš Pöpperle
Goalies
Sami Aittokallio

| | 0–1 | 6:48 – Nutivaara (Mäenalanen, Hakanpää |
| Přibyl (Hrbas) – 32:39 | 1–1 |
| Čajkovský (Barinka, Černoch) – 35:36 | 2–1 |
| Cingel (Sabolič, Kudrna) – 50:36 | 3–1 |
| | 3–2 | 51:03 – Hakanpää (Pyörälä, Aaltonen) |
| Hlinka (Přibyl, Buchtele) – 55:56 | 4–2 |

28 min
Penalties
8 min

| 3 November 2015; 18:00 | Eisbären Berlin (Germany) | 2–5 (0–2, 1–1, 1–2) | (Sweden) Skellefteå AIK | O2 World, Berlin; Attendance: 4,554 |

Game reference

Petri Vehanen
Goalies
Erik Hanses

| | 0–1 | 3:04 – Heed (Norman, Forssell) |
| | 0–2 | 12:00 – Forssell (Aho, Ericsson) |
| | 0–3 | 27:45 – (PP) Heed (Holmström, Pesonen) |
| Gervais (Braun, Tallackson) – 30:38 | 1–3 |
| | 1–4 | 40:46 – Calof (Pesonen, Heed) |
| | 1–5 | 45:47 – Ericsson (Norman, Forssell) |
| Braun (Olver, Tallackson) – 55:16 | 2–5 |

6 min
Penalties
8 min

| 3 November 2015; 19:00 | Djurgårdens IF (Sweden) | 1–2 (0–1, 1–0, 0–1) | (Finland) Lukko | Hovet, Stockholm; Attendance: 978 |

Game reference

Mikael Tellqvist
Goalies
Ryan Zapolski

| | 0–1 | 8:55 – Lähteenmäki (Nurmi, Niskala) |
| Hultström (Mattsson, Sörensen) – 38:53 | 1–1 |
| | 1–2 | 56:43 – Mikkola (Gagnon) |

14 min
Penalties
20 min

==== Second Leg ====
| 10 November 2015; 16:30 | Kärpät (Finland) | 4–1 (0–0, 2–0, 2–1) | (Czech Republic) HC Sparta Praha | Oulun Energia Areena, Oulu; Attendance: 3,716 |

Game reference

Iiro Tarkki
Goalies
Tomáš Pöpperle
Referee:
Marcus Vinnerborg

| Laatikainen (Pyörälä, Aaltonen) – 27:32 | 1–0 |
| Niemi (Aho, Lukkonen) – 36:24 | 2–0 |
| | 2–1 | 42:37 – Čajkovský (Procházka, Černoch) |
| Aho (Nutivaara, Masuhr) – 43:59 | 3–1 |
| Pyörälä (Junttila, Nutivaara) – 59:11 | 4–1 |

6 min
Penalties
6 min

Oulun Kärpät won 6–5 on Aggregate.

| 10 November 2015; 16:30 | Lukko (Finland) | 2–1 (0–0, 1–1, 1–0) | (Sweden) Djurgårdens IF | Kivikylän Areena, Rauma; Attendance: 2,435 |

Game reference

Ryan Zapolski
Goalies
Mikael Tellqvist
Referee:
Edward Odins

| Gagnon (PS) – 34:48 | 1–0 |
| | 1–1 | 36:37 – Ahlén (Holm) |
| Koivisto (Riska, Mikkola) (SHG, ENG) – 58:41 | 2–1 |

8 min
Penalties
2 min

Lukko won 4–2 on Aggregate.

| 10 November 2015; 18:00 | Luleå HF (Sweden) | 5–0 (2–0, 0–0, 3–0) | (Finland) Tappara | Coop Norrbotten Arena, Luleå; Attendance: 3,829 |

Game reference

Daniel Larsson
Goalies
Tomi Karhunen
Referee:
Lars Bruggemann

| Fabricius (Melart, Forsberg) – 13:13 | 1–0 |
| Sylvegård (Harju, Rajala) – 16:01 | 2–0 |
| Micflikier (Hedman) – 50:03 | 3–0 |
| Micflikier (Rajala) (PP) – 54:12 | 4–0 |
| Cehlárik (Rajala, Melart) – 55:39 | 5–0 |

6 min
Penalties
8 min

Luleå HF won 6–2 on Aggregate.

| 10 November 2015; 18:00 | Skellefteå AIK (Sweden) | 2–1 (1–1, 0–0, 1–0) | (Germany) Eisbären Berlin | Skellefteå Kraft Arena, Skellefteå; Attendance: 1,758 |

Game reference

Markus Svensson
Goalies
Petri Vehanen
Referee:
Stefan Fonselius

| | 0–1 | 3:11 – Noebels (Baxmann) |
| Lundberg (Lindgren, Holmström) – 6:07 | 1–1 |
| Forssell (Norman, Aho) (PP) – 56:04 | 2–1 |

Skellefteå AIK won 7–3 on Aggregate.

| 10 November 2015; 18:00 | Storhamar Ishockey (Norway) | 1–2 (0–1, 1–0, 0–1) | (Finland) TPS | Hamar OL-Amfi, Hamar; Attendance: 5,367 |

Game reference

Oskar Östlund
Goalies
Teemu Lassila
Referee:
Vladimír Pešina

| | 0–1 | 13:44 – (PP) Kumeliauskas (Spina, Perrin) |
| Berglund (Rose, Øksnes) – 31:57 | 1–1 |
| | 1–2 | 59:23 – (ENG) Tallinder (Tikkanen, Kumeliauskas) |

10 min
Penalties
30 min

TPS Turku won 6–4 on Aggregate.

| 10 November 2015; 18:45 | HC Davos (Switzerland) | 4–3 (3–1, 0–2, 1–0) | (Czech Republic) Bílí Tygři Liberec | Vaillant Arena, Davos; Attendance: 3,252 |

Game reference

Leonardo Genoni
Goalies
Ján Lašák
Referee:
Mikael Nord

| Walser (Axelsson, Ambühl) – 5:38 | 1–0 |
| | 1–1 | 8:56 – Jelínek |
| Wieser (PS) – 9:29 | 2–1 |
| Jörg (Walser) – 12:20 | 3–1 |
| | 3–2 | 24:23 – Jelínek |
| | 3–3 | 29:45 – Plutnar (Řepík) |
| Wieser (SHG, ENG) – 56:33 | 4–3 |

12 min
Penalties
4 min

HC Davos won 9–6 on Aggregate.

| 10 November 2015; 19:00 | HV71 (Sweden) | 1–1 (0–0, 1–1, 0–0) | (Finland) Espoo Blues | Kinnarps Arena, Jönköping; Attendance: 1,653 |

Game reference
| Fredrik Pettersson Wentzel | Goalies | Christian Engstrand |
Christensen (Hansson, Brithen) (PP) – 28:06 / 1–0; / 1–1 / 29:52 – (PP) Makkonen (Korhonen, Hirschovits)
| 10 min | Penalties | 10 min |

Espoo Blues won 4–2 on Aggregate.

| 10 November 2015; 19:00 | Frölunda HC (Sweden) | 6–0 (0–0, 3–0, 3–0) | (Czech Republic) HC Litvínov | Frölundaborg, Gothenburg; Attendance: 1,378 |

Game reference

Lars Johansson
Goalies
Michael Petrásek

| Abbott (PP) – 27:47 | 1–0 |
| Figren (Falth, Lars Johansson) – 29:20 | 2–0 |
| Stålberg (Lasu) – 37:35 | 3–0 |
| Bengtsson (Lehkonen, Fantenberg) (PP) – 43:16 | 4–0 |
| Abbott (Johnson, Sundström) – 48:02 | 5–0 |
| Lasch (Abbott, Tömmernes) (PP) – 54:39 | 6–0 |

6 min
Penalties
20 min

Frölunda HC won 7–2 on Aggregate.

=== Quarter-finals ===
The first legs were played on 1 December, and the second legs were played on 8 December 2015.

| Team 1 | Agg. | Team 2 | 1st leg | 2nd leg |
|---|---|---|---|---|
| Espoo Blues (Finland) | 3–5 | (Finland) Kärpät | 2–0 | 1–5 |
| TPS (Finland) | 4–5 (0–1 SO) | (Finland) Lukko | 3–3 | 1–2 (OT) |
| HC Davos (Switzerland) | 5–2 | (Sweden) Skellefteå AIK | 1–1 | 4–1 |
| Luleå HF (Sweden) | 7–8 (1–3 SO) | (Sweden) Frölunda HC | 3–2 | 4–6 (OT) |

==== First Leg ====
| 1 December 2015; 18:30 | TPS (Finland) | 3–3 (1–2, 0–0, 2–1) | (Finland) Lukko | HK Areena, Turku; Attendance: 3,006 |

Game reference

Oskari Setänen
Goalies
Ryan Zapolski
Referees:
Roman Gofman
Jan Hribik
Linesmen:
Iikka Kiilunen
Joonas Saha

| Kallio (Perrin) – 6:06 | 1–0 |
| | 1–1 | 9:55 – Nurmi (Lähteenmäki) |
| | 1–2 | 13:28 – Lahti (Asplund) |
| | 1–3 | 42:01 – Piitulainen |
| Spina (Kallio, Perrin) – 57:17 | 2–3 |
| Kallio (Perrin, Pikkarainen) (PP) – 59:40 | 3–3 |

10 min
Penalties
12 min

| 1 December 2015; 18:30 | Espoo Blues (Finland) | 2–0 (1–0, 0–0, 1–0) | (Finland) Kärpät | Espoo Metro Areena, Espoo; Attendance: 2,799 |

Game reference
| Kaapo Kähkönen | Goalies | Niko Hovinen | Referees: Peter Gebei; Morgan Johansson; Linesmen: Jani Pesonen; Masi Puolakka |
| Makkonen (Korhonen, Poukkula) (PP) – 8:44 / 1–0; Sailio (Vaakanainen) (SHG) – 49:32 / 2–0 | | | Referees: Peter Gebei; Morgan Johansson; Linesmen: Jani Pesonen; Masi Puolakka |
| 10 min | Penalties | 8 min | Referees: Peter Gebei; Morgan Johansson; Linesmen: Jani Pesonen; Masi Puolakka |

| 1 December 2015; 19:45 | HC Davos (Switzerland) | 1–1 (1–0, 0–1, 0–0) | (Sweden) Skellefteå AIK | Vaillant Arena, Davos; Attendance: 4,002 |

Game reference
| Leonardo Genoni | Goalies | Markus Svensson | Referees: Daniel Piechaczek; Marian Rohatsch; Linesmen: Roman Kaderli; Michael Tscherring |
| Aeschlimann (Wieser, Setoguchi) – 16:53 / 1–0; / 1–1 / 23:47 – (PP) Calof (Broadhurst, Forssell) | | | Referees: Daniel Piechaczek; Marian Rohatsch; Linesmen: Roman Kaderli; Michael Tscherring |
| 6 min | Penalties | 10 min | Referees: Daniel Piechaczek; Marian Rohatsch; Linesmen: Roman Kaderli; Michael Tscherring |

| 1 December 2015; 20:00 | Luleå HF (Sweden) | 3–2 (1–0, 1–2, 1–0) | (Sweden) Frölunda HC | Coop Norrbotten Arena, Luleå; Attendance: 4,130 |

Game reference

Joel Lassinantti
Goalies
Johan Gustafsson
Referees:
Martin Fraňo
Jussi Leppanen
Linesmen:
Jan Sandström
Emil Yletyienen

| Fabricius (Melart, Mastomäki) – 5:24 | 1–0 |
| | 1–1 | 22:22 – Lundqvist (Rosseli Olsen, Lasch) |
| Ekarv (Oskarsson, Melart) – 33:57 | 2–1 |
| | 2–2 | 38:24 – Larsson (Lundqvist, Rosseli Olsen) |
| Mastomäki (Harju, Sigalet) – 57:07 | 3–2 |

4 min
Penalties
8 min

==== Second Leg ====
| 8 December 2015; 18:30 | Kärpät (Finland) | 5–1 (2–0, 0–0, 3–1) | (Finland) Espoo Blues | Oulun Energia Areena, Oulu; Attendance: 3,173 |

Game reference

Sami Aittokallio
Goalies
Kaapo Kähkönen
Referees:
Daniel Stricker
Marc Wiegand
Linesmen:
Henri Neva
Hannu Sormunen

| Junttila (Laatikainen, Ikonen) – 0:56 | 1–0 |
| Hakanpää (Aaltonen, Junttila) – 1:19 | 2–0 |
| Junttila (Masuhr, Huml) – 46:47 | 3–0 |
| | 3–1 | 47:12 – Suomela (Seppälä, Sailio) |
| Nutivaara (Aho, Junttila) – 48:01 | 4–1 |
| Junttila (SHG) – 58:46 | 5–1 |

8 min
Penalties
10 min

Oulun Kärpät won 5–3 on Aggregate.

| 8 December 2015; 18:30 | Lukko (Finland) | 1–1 (1–0 SO) (0–0, 1–0, 0–1) (0–0) (1–0) | (Finland) TPS | Kivikylän Areena, Rauma; Attendance: 3,389 |

Game reference
| Ryan Zapolski | Goalies | Oskari Setänen | Referees: Tobias Björk; Patrik Sjöberg; Linesmen: Markus Hagerström; Sakari Suominen |
| Vahalahti (Koivisto, Asplund) – 35:52 / 1–0; / 1–1 / 55:36 – Tikkanen | | | Referees: Tobias Björk; Patrik Sjöberg; Linesmen: Markus Hagerström; Sakari Suominen |
| Koivisto (miss); Gagnon (miss); Vahalahti (miss); Asplund; Lahti (miss) | Shootout | (miss) Perrin; (miss) Numellin; (miss) Kumeliauskas; (miss) Kallio; (miss) Spina | Referees: Tobias Björk; Patrik Sjöberg; Linesmen: Markus Hagerström; Sakari Suominen |
| 4 min | Penalties | 6 min | Referees: Tobias Björk; Patrik Sjöberg; Linesmen: Markus Hagerström; Sakari Suominen |

Lukko won 5–4 on Aggregate after winning 1–0 in a shootout.

| 8 December 2015; 19:00 | Skellefteå AIK (Sweden) | 1–4 (0–2, 1–0, 0–2) | (Switzerland) HC Davos | Skellefteå Kraft Arena, Skellefteå; Attendance: 2,134 |

Game reference

Markus Svensson
Goalies
Leonardo Genoni
Referees:
Alexey Anisimov
Anssi Salonen
Linesmen:
Johannes Käck
Emil Yletyienen

| | 0–1 | 4:07 – Axelsson (Wieser) |
| | 0–2 | 9:52 – Corvi (Wieser) |
| Forssell (Ericsson, Burström) – 20:23 | 1–2 |
| | 1–3 | 50:32 – (SHG) Ambühl |
| | 1–4 | 59:23 – (ENG) Lindgren (Dubois) |

6 min
Penalties
34 min

HC Davos won 5–2 on Aggregate.

| 8 December 2015; 20:00 | Frölunda HC (Sweden) | 5–4 (3–1 SO) (2–2, 3–1, 0–1) (0–0) (1–0) | (Sweden) Luleå HF | Frölundaborg, Gothenburg; Attendance: 1,590 |

Game reference

Joel Lassinantti
Goalies
Lars Johansson
Referees:
Danny Kurmann
Maxim Sidorenko
Linesmen:
Tobias Haster
Henrik Pihlblad

| Sundström (Fantenberg, Bengtsson) – 5:09 | 1–0 |
| | 1–1 | 11:33 – (PP) Rajala (Micflikier, Lagace) |
| Johnson (Lasch, Abbott) (PP 5 on 3) – 17:15 | 2–1 |
| | 2–2 | 18:36 – (SHG) Forsberg (Fabricius) |
| Carlsson (Lehkonen, Figren) – 21:31 | 3–2 |
| | 3–3 | 21:42 – Mastomäki (Fabricius, Sigalet) |
| Fantenberg (PP) – 28:31 | 4–3 |
| Abbott (Lundqvist) (PP) – 34:35 | 5–3 |
| | 5–4 | 46:12 – (PP) Harju (Sigalet, Schira) |

*Lasch
Abbott
Sundström (miss)
Figren (miss)
Johnson
Shootout
Lagace
(miss) Rajala
(miss) Micflikier
(miss) Harju
35 min
Penalties
16 min

Frölunda HC won 8–7 on Aggregate after winning 3–1 in a shootout.

=== Semi-finals ===
The first legs were played on 12 January, and the second legs were played on 19 January 2016.

| Team 1 | Agg. | Team 2 | 1st leg | 2nd leg |
|---|---|---|---|---|
| Lukko (Finland) | 4–5 | (Finland) Kärpät | 2–3 | 2–2 |
| HC Davos (Switzerland) | 1–6 | (Sweden) Frölunda HC | 0–5 | 1–1 |

| 12 January 2016; 16:30 | Lukko (Finland) | 2–3 (2–1, 0–0, 0–2) | (Finland) Kärpät | Kivikylän Areena, Rauma; Attendance: 2,063 |

Game reference

Ryan Zapolski
Goalies
Sami Aittokallio
Referees:
Sören Persson
Tobias Wehrli
Linesmen:
Joonas Saha
Sakari Suominen

| Koivisto (Lahti, Ahonen) – 9:36 | 1–0 |
| Virtanen – 10:59 | 2–0 |
| | 2–1 | 14:40 – (PP) Kukkonen (Nutivaara, Pirnes) |
| | 2–2 | 44:29 – Keränen (Nutivaara, Pirnes) |
| | 2–3 | 53:16 – Aaltonen (Aho, Laatikainen) |

6 min
Penalties
4 min

| 12 January 2016; 20:15 | HC Davos (Switzerland) | 0–5 (0–1, 0–1, 0–3) | (Sweden) Frölunda HC | Eisstadion Davos, Davos; Attendance: 5,887 |

Game reference

Leonardo Genoni
Goalies
Lars Johansson
Referees:
Roman Gofman
Daniel Piechaczek
Linesmen:
Roger Bürgi
Simon Wust

| 0–1 | 5:29 – (PP) Abbott (Lundqvist, Lasch) |
| 0–2 | 28:55 – Lehkonen |
| 0–3 | 40:43 – Lasch (Rosseli Olsen) |
| 0–4 | 48:00 – Larsson (Fantenberg, Sundström) |
| 0–5 | 59:04 – Larsson (Sundström |

16 min
Penalties
8 min

=== Second Leg ===
| 19 January 2016; 16:30 | Kärpät (Finland) | 2–2 (0–0, 1–1, 1–1) | (Finland) Lukko | Oulun Energia Areena, Oulu; Attendance: 3,394 |

Game reference

Sami Aittokallio
Goalies
Ryan Zapolski
Referees:
Gordon Schukies
Marcus Vinnerborg
Linesmen:
Jani Pesonen
Hannu Sormunen

| Pyörälä (Aho, Nutivaara) (PP) – 26:18 | 1–0 |
| | 1–1 | 31:02 – (PP) Kovisto (Asplund, Lahti) |
| Nutivaara (Puljujarvi, Laatikainen) – 41:29 | 2–1 |
| | 2–2 | 54:23 – (PP) Lahti |

6 min
Penalties
8 min

Oulun Kärpät won 5–4 on Aggregate.

| 19 January 2016; 20:05 | Frölunda HC (Sweden) | 1–1 (1–0, 0–1, 0–0) | (Switzerland) HC Davos | Frölundaborg, Gothenburg; Attendance: 3,819 |

Game reference
| Lars Johansson | Goalies | Leonardo Genoni | Referees: Stefan Fonselius; Jozef Kubuš; Linesmen: Tobias Haster; Andreas Malmqvist |
| Carlsson (Lehkonen, Figren) – 3:29 / 1–0; / 1–1 / 21:29 – (PP) Ambühl (Corvi, Lindgren) | | | Referees: Stefan Fonselius; Jozef Kubuš; Linesmen: Tobias Haster; Andreas Malmqvist |
| 10 min | Penalties | 30 min | Referees: Stefan Fonselius; Jozef Kubuš; Linesmen: Tobias Haster; Andreas Malmqvist |

Frölunda HC won 6–1 on Aggregate.

Notes

1. Order of legs reversed, since HC Davos home ice was unavailable on 19 January.

=== Final ===
The final was played on 9 February 2016.

| 9 February 2016; 18:30 | Kärpät (Finland) | 1–2 (0–2, 0–0, 1–0) | (Sweden) Frölunda HC | Oulun Energia Areena, Oulu; Attendance: 6,200 |

Game reference

Sami Aittokallio
Goalies
Lars Johansson
Referees:
(Switzerland) Tobias Wehrli
(Switzerland) Marc Wiegand
Linesmen:
(Czech Republic) Miroslav Lhotský
(Germany) Lukas Kohlmüller

| | 0–1 | 16:20 – R. Lasch (O. Fantenberg, J. Larsson) |
| | 0–2 | 17:43 – S. Abbott (H. Tömmernes, J. Sundström) |
| J. Keränen (S. Suoranta, A. Masuhr) (PP1) – 47:01 | 1–2 |

2 min
Penalties
8 min
19
Shots
23

== Statistics ==
=== Home Game and Overall ===
As of 9 February 2016

| Pos. | Team | Regular season | | Playoffs | | Overall | | | 2014–15 average |
| Pos. | Team | Matches | Attendance | Matches | Attendance | Matches | Total | Average | 2014–15 average |
|---|---|---|---|---|---|---|---|---|---|
| 1 | (Germany) Adler Mannheim | 2 | 16,963 | 1 | 5,571 | 3 | 22,534 | 7,511 | 5,322 |
| 2 | (Germany) Düsseldorfer EG | 2 | 13,266 | 1 | 5,431 | 3 | 18,697 | 6,232 | — |
| 3 | (Switzerland) SC Bern | 2 | 11,989 | 0 | - | 2 | 11,989 | 5,995 | 4,524 |
| 4 | (Germany) Eisbären Berlin | 2 | 12,220 | 2 | 8,623 | 4 | 20,843 | 5,211 | 5,573 |
| 5 | (Slovakia) HC Košice | 2 | 9,810 | 1 | 5,038 | 3 | 14,848 | 4,949 | 4,698 |
| 6 | (Norway) Storhamar Ishockey | 2 | 10,049 | 2 | 9,648 | 4 | 19,697 | 4,924 | — |
| 7 | (Switzerland) Genève-Servette HC | 2 | 9,033 | 0 | - | 2 | 9,033 | 4,517 | 4,695 |
| 8 | (Finland) Kärpät | 2 | 11,178 | 5 | 19,954 | 7 | 31,132 | 4,447 | 4,049 |
| 9 | (Austria) Black Wings Linz | 2 | 8,600 | 0 | — | 2 | 8,600 | 4,300 | — |
| 10 | (Switzerland) HC Davos | 2 | 8,009 | 4 | 17,286 | 6 | 25,295 | 4,216 | — |
| 11 | (United Kingdom) Sheffield Steelers | 2 | 8,097 | 0 | — | 2 | 8,097 | 4,049 | — |
| 12 | (Sweden) Luleå HF | 2 | 8,125 | 3 | 17,651 | 5 | 19,747 | 3,949 | 3,753 |
| 13 | (Finland) HIFK | 2 | 7,806 | 1 | 3,649 | 3 | 11,455 | 3,818 | 3,736 |
| 14 | (Finland) TPS | 2 | 8,326 | 3 | 10,636 | 5 | 18,962 | 3,792 | 3,476 |
| 15 | (Czech Republic) Vítkovice Steel | 2 | 6,779 | 1 | 4,057 | 3 | 10,836 | 3,612 | 3,229 |
| 16 | (Czech Republic) Bílí Tygři Liberec | 2 | 4,499 | 2 | 9,141 | 4 | 13,640 | 3,410 | 1,782 |
| 17 | (Switzerland) EV Zug | 2 | 6,778 | 0 | - | 2 | 6,778 | 3,389 | 2,894 |
| 18 | (Czech Republic) HC Sparta Praha | 2 | 5,940 | 2 | 7,486 | 4 | 13,426 | 3,357 | 2,213 |
| 19 | (Finland) Tappara | 2 | 7,396 | 2 | 6,000 | 4 | 13,396 | 3,349 | 2,721 |
| 20 | (France) Grenoble | 2 | 6,600 | 0 | — | 2 | 6,600 | 3,300 | — |
| 21 | (Scotland) Braehead Clan | 2 | 6,543 | 0 | — | 2 | 6,543 | 3,272 | — |
| 22 | (Germany) Krefeld Pinguine | 2 | 6,462 | 0 | — | 2 | 6,462 | 3,231 | 3,045 |
| 23 | (Norway) Stavanger Oilers | 2 | 5,879 | 1 | 3,678 | 3 | 9,557 | 3,186 | 3,566 |
| 24 | (Austria) Vienna Capitals | 2 | 6,900 | 1 | 2,400 | 3 | 9,300 | 3,100 | 4,050 |
| 25 | (Austria) KAC Klagenfurt | 2 | 6,176 | 0 | — | 2 | 6,176 | 3,088 | — |
| 26 | (Czech Republic) HC Pardubice | 2 | 6,148 | 0 | — | 2 | 6,148 | 3,074 | 1,337 |
| 27 | (Switzerland) ZSC Lions | 2 | 3,811 | 1 | 4,563 | 3 | 8,374 | 2,791 | 2,187 |
| 28 | (Germany) Red Bull Munich | 2 | 6,317 | 1 | 1,970 | 3 | 8,287 | 2,762 | — |
| 29 | (Switzerland) HC Fribourg-Gottéron | 2 | 5,477 | 0 | - | 2 | 5,477 | 2,739 | 2,350 |
| 30 | (Belarus) Neman Grodno | 2 | 5,242 | 0 | — | 2 | 5,242 | 2,621 | — |
| 31 | (Sweden) Färjestad BK | 2 | 6,104 | 1 | 1,594 | 3 | 7,698 | 2,566 | 1,602 |
| 32 | (France) Rapaces de Gap | 2 | 5,062 | 0 | — | 2 | 5,062 | 2,531 | — |
| 33 | (Slovakia) HK Nitra | 2 | 5,047 | 0 | — | 2 | 5,047 | 2,524 | — |
| 34 | (Sweden) Skellefteå AIK | 2 | 6,424 | 3 | 6,101 | 5 | 12,525 | 2,505 | 2,912 |
| 35 | (Finland) Lukko | 2 | 5,209 | 4 | 9,603 | 6 | 14,812 | 2,469 | 2,608 |
| 36 | (Finland) JYP | 2 | 5,315 | 1 | 2,045 | 3 | 7,360 | 2,453 | 1,869 |
| 37 | (Sweden) Linköpings HC | 2 | 5,763 | 1 | 1,565 | 3 | 7,328 | 2,443 | 3,229 |
| 38 | (Sweden) Växjö Lakers | 2 | 5,154 | 1 | 1,680 | 3 | 6,834 | 2,278 | 2,892 |
| 39 | (Finland) KalPa | 2 | 4,522 | 0 | - | 2 | 4,522 | 2,261 | 2,564 |
| 40 | (Germany) ERC Ingolstadt | 2 | 4,601 | 1 | 2,046 | 3 | 6,647 | 2,216 | 1,222 |
| 41 | (Sweden) Frölunda HC | 2 | 4,792 | 4 | 8,493 | 6 | 13,285 | 2,214 | 3,625 |
| 42 | (Finland) Espoo Blues | 2 | 3,887 | 3 | 7,027 | 5 | 10,914 | 2,183 | — |
| 43 | (Czech Republic) Oceláři Třinec | 2 | 4,285 | 1 | 2,112 | 3 | 6,397 | 2,132 | 3,468 |
| 44 | (Czech Republic) HC Litvínov | 2 | 3,997 | 2 | 3,209 | 4 | 7,206 | 1,802 | — |
| 45 | (Sweden) HV71 | 2 | 4,418 | 2 | 2,765 | 4 | 7,185 | 1,796 | 2,383 |
| 46 | (Denmark) SønderjyskE | 2 | 3,259 | 0 | — | 2 | 3,259 | 1,630 | 1,888 |
| 47 | (Sweden) Djurgårdens IF | 2 | 4,656 | 2 | 1,544 | 4 | 6,200 | 1,550 | 2,817 |
| 48 | (Austria) Red Bull Salzburg | 2 | 3,102 | 1 | 1,206 | 3 | 4,308 | 1,436 | 2,247 |
| Tournament total | | 96 | 326,015 | 61 | 187,745 | 157 | 513,760 | 3,272 | 3,074 |

Source: Champions Hockey League.
