= Fredrik Forsberg =

Fredrik Forsberg may refer to:

- Fredrik Forsberg (ice hockey, born June 1996), Swedish ice hockey forward playing for Djurgårdens IF
- Fredrik Forsberg (ice hockey, born December 1996), Swedish ice hockey forward playing for Leksands IF
