= Oskari Siiki =

Finnish ice hockey player

- Born: May 5, 1995 (age 30) Turku, Finland
- Height: 5 ft 9 in (175 cm)
- Weight: 159 lb (72 kg; 11 st 5 lb)
- Position: Left wing
- Shoots: Left
- Mestis team Former teams: TUTO Hockey; HC TPS; Espoo Blues
- Playing career: 2013–present

Oskari Siiki (born May 5, 1995) is a Finnish professional ice hockey player. He is currently playing with TUTO Hockey in the Finnish Mestis.

Siiki made his SM-liiga debut playing with HC TPS during the 2012–13 SM-liiga season.
