= Peter Jánský =

Czech ice hockey player

- Born: May 3, 1985 (age 39); Most, Czechoslovakia
- Height: 6 ft 3 in (191 cm)
- Weight: 223 lb (101 kg; 15 st 13 lb)
- Position: Forward
- Shoots: Left
- Czech Extraliga team Former teams: HC Sparta Praha; HC Litvínov
- National team: Czech Republic
- Playing career: 2004–present

Peter Jánský (born May 3, 1985) is a Czech professional ice hockey player. He has played with HC Litvínov in the Czech Extraliga for seven seasons, from the 2004–05 Czech Extraliga season till the 2010–11 Czech Extraliga season. In 2011 he moved to another Czech Extraliga team, HC Sparta Praha.

Jánský has also played for the Czech Republic men's national ice hockey team. He has played for them in the Euro Hockey Tour.
