= Tobias Hage =

Swedish ice hockey player

- Born: August 18, 1991 (age 33); Stockholm, Sweden
- Height: 6 ft 1 in (185 cm)
- Weight: 190 lb (86 kg; 13 st 8 lb)
- Position: Forward
- Shoots: Left
- SHL team: Djurgårdens IF Hockey
- NHL draft: Undrafted
- Playing career: 2009–present

Tobias Hage (born August 18, 1991) is a Swedish ice hockey player. He is currently playing with Djurgårdens IF Hockey of the Swedish Hockey League (SHL).

Hage made his Swedish Hockey League debut playing with Djurgårdens IF Hockey during the 2014–15 SHL season.
