= Jere Seppälä =

Finnish ice hockey player

- Born: January 4, 1993 (age 32) Kemi, Finland
- Height: 5 ft 9 in (175 cm)
- Weight: 163 lb (74 kg; 11 st 9 lb)
- Position: Defence
- Shoots: Left
- Liiga team: Espoo Blues
- Playing career: 2013–present

Jere Seppala (born January 4, 1993) is a Finnish former professional ice hockey defenceman.

Seppala made his Liiga debut playing with Espoo Blues during the 2013–14 Liiga season. He also played for HC Ässät Pori and SaiPa. After his retirement, he has worked as a massage therapist with HC Ässät.
