= Turo Asplund =

Finnish ice hockey player

- Born: 8 June 1985 (age 39); Jyväskylä, Finland
- Height: 5 ft 11 in (180 cm)
- Weight: 216 lb (98 kg; 15 st 6 lb)
- Position: Centre
- Shoots: Left
- Liiga team Former teams: Sport; Jukurit; JYP Jyväskylä; Ilves; Lukko
- NHL draft: Undrafted
- Playing career: 2006–present

Turo Asplund (born 8 June 1985) is a Finnish professional ice hockey player currently playing for Sport of the Finnish Liiga.

Asplund made his SM-liiga debut playing with JYP during the 2009–10 SM-liiga season.
