= Jari Sailio =

Finnish ice hockey player

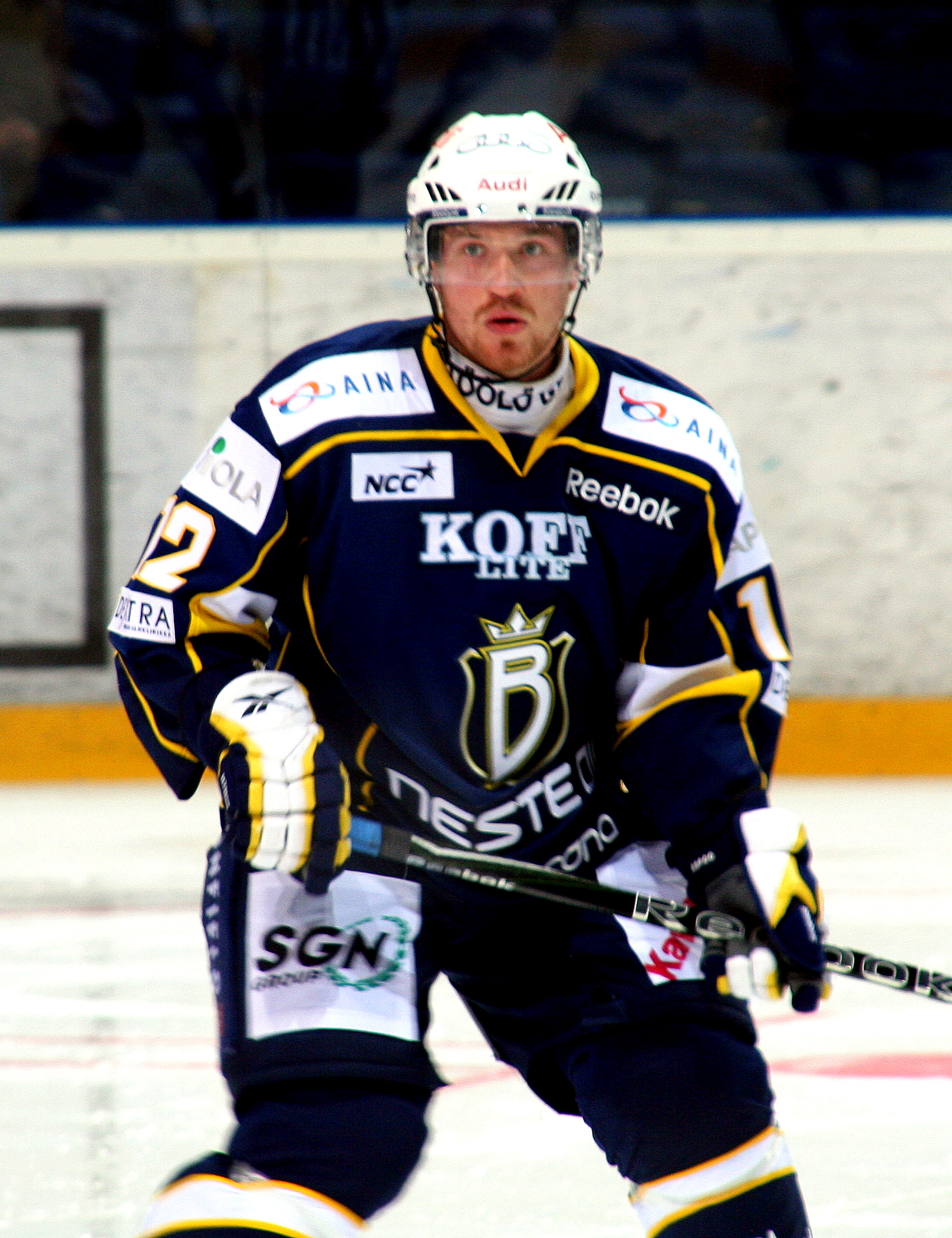
- Born: 18 March 1986 (age 39) Hyvinkää, FIN
- Height: 5 ft 10 in (178 cm)
- Weight: 187 lb (85 kg; 13 st 5 lb)
- Position: Forward
- Shoots: Left
- Liiga team Former teams: Free agent HPK; Espoo Blues; HIFK; Arystan Temirtau; Oulun Kärpät; Ritten Sport; Ferencvárosi TC; Chamonix
- Playing career: 2006–present

Jari Sailio (born 18 March 1986 in Hyvinkää) is a Finnish professional ice hockey forward who is currently a free agent. He last played for Hämeenlinnan Pallokerho in the Finnish Liiga.

In 2014, Sailio re-joined the Blues after a season with Arystan Temirtau in the Kazakhstan Hockey Championship He agreed to an initial three-month try-out contract with the Blues, before signing a one-year deal on 30 August 2014. He previously played for Blues of Liiga in the 2010–11 season.
