= Lukáš Derner =

Czech ice hockey player

- Born: August 24, 1983 (age 43) Liberec, Czechoslovakia
- Height: 6 ft 1 in (185 cm)
- Weight: 198 lb (90 kg; 14 st 2 lb)
- Position: Defence
- Shot: Left
- Played for: HC Bílí Tygři Liberec; HC Plzeň
- National team: Czech Republic
- Playing career: 2003–2025

Lukáš Derner (born August 24, 1983) is a Czech former professional ice hockey player. He most notably played defence for HC Bílí Tygři Liberec in the Czech Extraliga (ELH). He began his career with HC Liberec in the season 1999–2000. Derner announced his retirement from professional hockey following 20 seasons with Liberec on 24 April 2025, holding franchise records for games played with 895 regular season appearances and 163 playoff contests.
