= Michal Bulíř =

Czech ice hockey player (born 1991)

- Born: August 12, 1991 (age 34) Liberec, Czechoslovakia
- Height: 6 ft 2 in (188 cm)
- Weight: 198 lb (90 kg; 14 st 2 lb)
- Position: Forward
- Shoots: Left
- ELH team Former teams: Motor České Budějovice; HC Bílí Tygři Liberec; Metallurg Magnitogorsk; HC Plzeň
- Playing career: 2009–present

Michal Bulíř (born August 12, 1991) is a Czech professional ice hockey player. He is currently Captain of Motor České Budějovice of the Czech Extraliga (ELH).

== Playing career ==
Bulíř made his Czech Extraliga debut playing with HC Bílí Tygři Liberec during the 2009–10 Czech Extraliga season. Following his fourteenth season with Liberec, Bulíř left as a free agent to add a veteran presence with Motor České Budějovice in signing a three-year contract on 1 April 2025.

== Career statistics ==
			Regular season					Playoffs
Season	Team	League	GP	G	A	Pts	PIM	GP	G	A	Pts	PIM
