= Jussi Makkonen =

Finnish ice hockey player

- Born: April 24, 1985 (age 41) Turku
- Height: 6 ft 4 in (193 cm)
- Weight: 207 lb (94 kg; 14 st 11 lb)
- Position: Forward
- Shot: Left
- Played for: Espoo Blues; TPS Turku; HPK; HC Dinamo Minsk; Frölunda HC; JYP Jyväskylä; Tappara; Porin Ässät; Katowice
- Playing career: 2004–2020

Jussi Makkonen (born April 24, 1985) is a Finnish retired ice hockey forward who last played for KH GKS Katowice.

== Awards ==
- Aarne Honkavaara award (Best goalscorer in SM-liiga), 2008–2009
