= Karel Kubát =

Czech ice hockey player

Karel Kubat
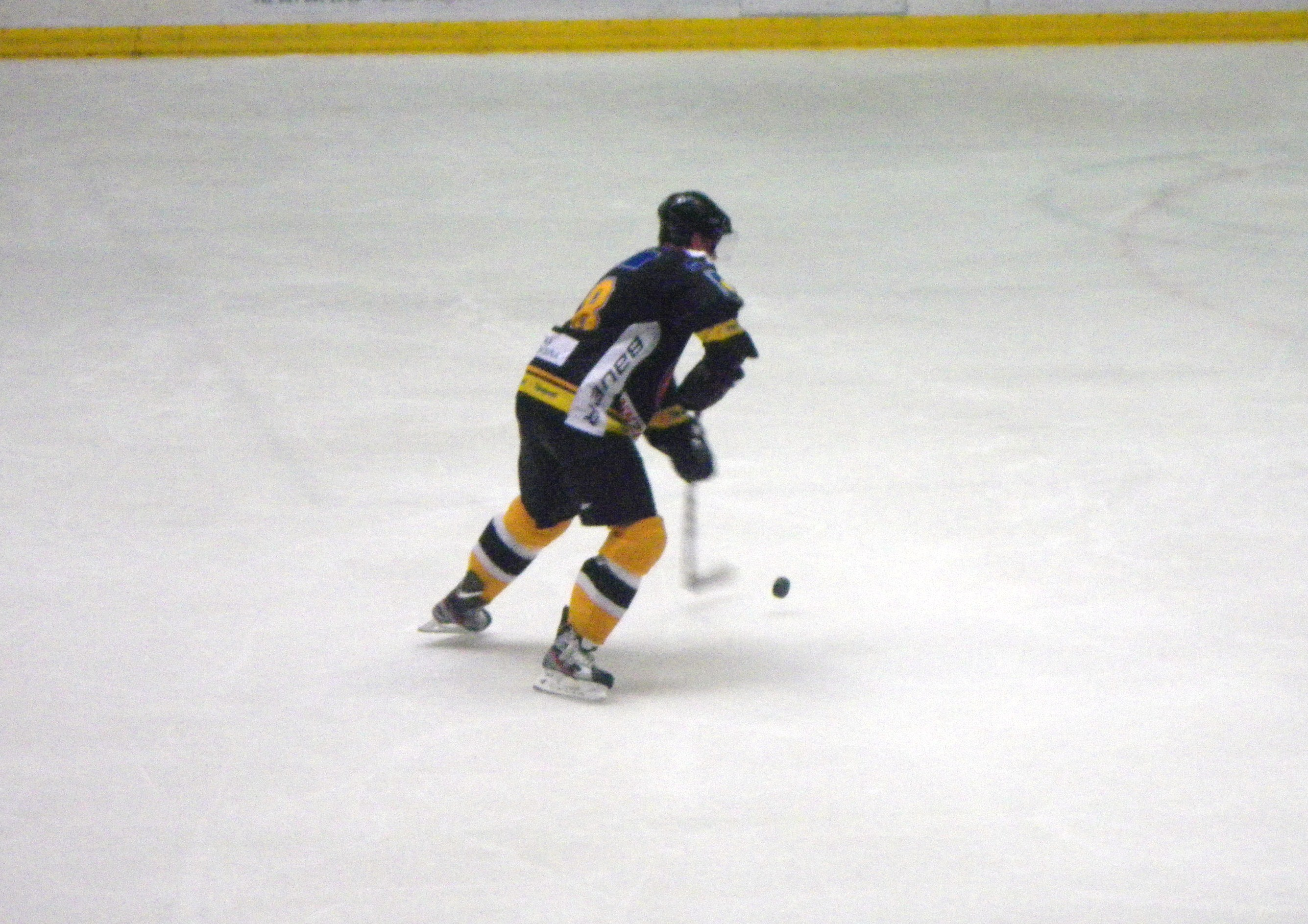
- Born: June 13, 1988 (age 36); Ústí nad Labem, Czechoslovakia
- Height: 6 ft 0 in (183 cm)
- Weight: 174 lb (79 kg; 12 st 6 lb)
- Position: Defense
- Shoots: Left
- Erste Liga team Former teams: HSC Csíkszereda; HC Litvínov; HC Most; HC Slovan Ústečtí Lvi; KLH Chomutov; HC Stadion Litoměřice; HC Sparta Praha; Admiral Vladivostok; HKM Zvolen; SK Kadaň; Podhale Nowy Targ
- Playing career: 2007–present

Karel Kubát (born June 13, 1988) is a Czech professional ice hockey defenceman. He is currently playing for HSC Csíkszereda in the Erste Liga.

He made his professional debut during the 2007–08 Czech Extraliga season for HC Litvínov of the Czech Extraliga. He has formerly played with Admiral Vladivostok in the Kontinental Hockey League (KHL) and with Polish team Podhale Nowy Targ.

== Career statistics ==
=== Regular season and playoffs ===
			Regular season					Playoffs
Season	Team	League	GP	G	A	Pts	PIM	GP	G	A	Pts	PIM
