= Dave Spina =

American ice hockey player (born 1983)

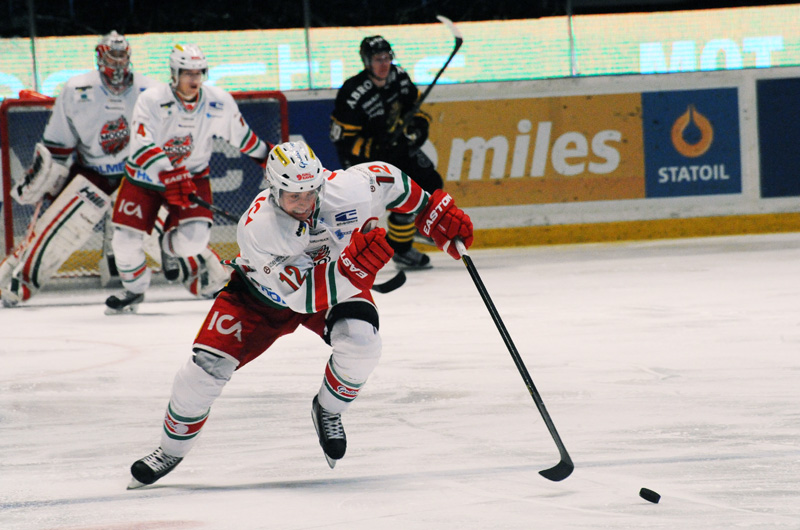
- Dave Spina with Modo Hockey in 2013.
- Born: June 5, 1983 (age 41); Springfield, Illinois, U.S.
- Height: 5 ft 10 in (178 cm)
- Weight: 185 lb (84 kg; 13 st 3 lb)
- Position: Right wing
- Shot: Right
- Played for: Utah Grizzlies; Springfield Falcons; San Antonio Rampage; Peoria Rivermen; Iserlohn Roosters; Modo Hockey; SaiPa; HC TPS
- NHL draft: Undrafted
- Playing career: 2005–2016

Dave Spina (born June 5, 1983) is an American retired professional ice hockey right winger.

On August 26, 2010, Spina signed a one-year contract with St. Louis Blues. Spina played the 2010–11 with the Peoria Rivermen of the American Hockey League. He has played over 300 regular-season games in the AHL also with the Utah Grizzlies, Springfield Falcons, and San Antonio Rampage.

After parts of two season's in the Finnish Liiga with SaiPa leading the club in scoring with 44 points in 56 games during the 2014–15 season, Spina left out of contract and signed a two-year deal with rivals HC TPS on March 31, 2015.

== Career statistics ==
=== Regular season and Playoffs ===
			Regular season					Playoffs
Season	Team	League	GP	G	A	Pts	PIM	GP	G	A	Pts	PIM
1999–00	Texas Tornado	NAHL	54	15	26	41	31	—	—	—	—	—
2000–01	U.S. National Development Team	USHL	23	3	7	10	28	—	—	—	—	—
2001–02	Boston College	HE	36	13	13	26	39	—	—	—	—	—
2002–03	Boston College	HE	37	17	20	37	34	—	—	—	—	—
2003–04	Boston College	HE	25	6	6	12	20	—	—	—	—	—
2004–05	Boston College	HE	40	13	15	28	42	—	—	—	—	—
2004–05	Utah Grizzlies	AHL	9	0	0	0	2	—	—	—	—	—
2005–06	South Carolina Stingrays	ECHL	11	7	0	7	6	—	—	—	—	—
2005–06	Springfield Falcons	AHL	54	11	13	24	36	—	—	—	—	—
2006–07	Springfield Falcons	AHL	73	15	20	35	80	—	—	—	—	—
2006–07	Johnstown Chiefs	ECHL	6	4	2	6	4	—	—	—	—	—
2007–08	San Antonio Rampage	AHL	76	21	29	50	35	7	3	0	3	2
2008–09	San Antonio Rampage	AHL	63	16	38	54	55	—	—	—	—	—
2009–10	San Antonio Rampage	AHL	26	6	11	17	29	—	—	—	—	—
2010–11	Peoria Rivermen	AHL	74	11	27	38	42	4	0	1	1	0
2011–12	Iserlohn Roosters	DEL	52	11	18	29	42	2	2	1	3	6
2012–13	Modo Hockey	SEL	55	10	17	27	32	5	0	0	0	10
2013–14	Modo Hockey	SHL	37	2	7	9	18	—	—	—	—	—
2013–14	SaiPa	Liiga	10	2	2	4	0	10	3	3	6	0
2014–15	SaiPa	Liiga	56	19	25	44	98	2	0	0	0	0
AHL totals			375	80	138	218	279	11	3	1	4	2

=== International ===
Year	Team	Event	Result	GP	G	A	Pts	PIM
2001	United States	WJC18	6th	6	2	5	7	8
Junior totals				6	2	5	7	8

== Awards and honors ==
Award	Year
All-Hockey East Rookie Team	2001–02
