= Christian Bull =

Norwegian professional ice hockey player

- Born: 13 August 1996 (age 28); Oslo, Norway
- Height: 6 ft 1 in (185 cm)
- Weight: 198 lb (90 kg; 14 st 2 lb)
- Position: Defence
- Shoots: Left
- ICEHL team Former teams: Pioneers Vorarlberg; Lillehammer IK; Storhamar Ishockey; IF Björklöven; Krefeld Pinguine; HC Nové Zámky
- National team: Norway
- Playing career: 2014–present

Christian Bull (born 13 August 1996) is a Norwegian professional ice hockey player who is currently playing for Pioneers Vorarlberg of the ICE Hockey League (ICEHL).

Bull competed in the 2018 IIHF World Championship as a member of the Norway men's national ice hockey team.

== Career statistics ==
=== Regular season and playoffs ===
| | | | Regular season | | | | | Playoffs |
| Season | Team | League | GP | G | A | Pts | PIM | GP | G | A | Pts | PIM |
|---|---|---|---|---|---|---|---|---|---|---|---|---|
| 2021–22 | HC Nové Zámky | Slovak | 49 | 4 | 15 | 19 | 38 | — | — | — | — | — |

=== International ===
| Year | Team | Event | Result | GP | G | A | Pts | PIM |
