= Michal Trávníček =

Czech professional ice hockey player (born 1980)

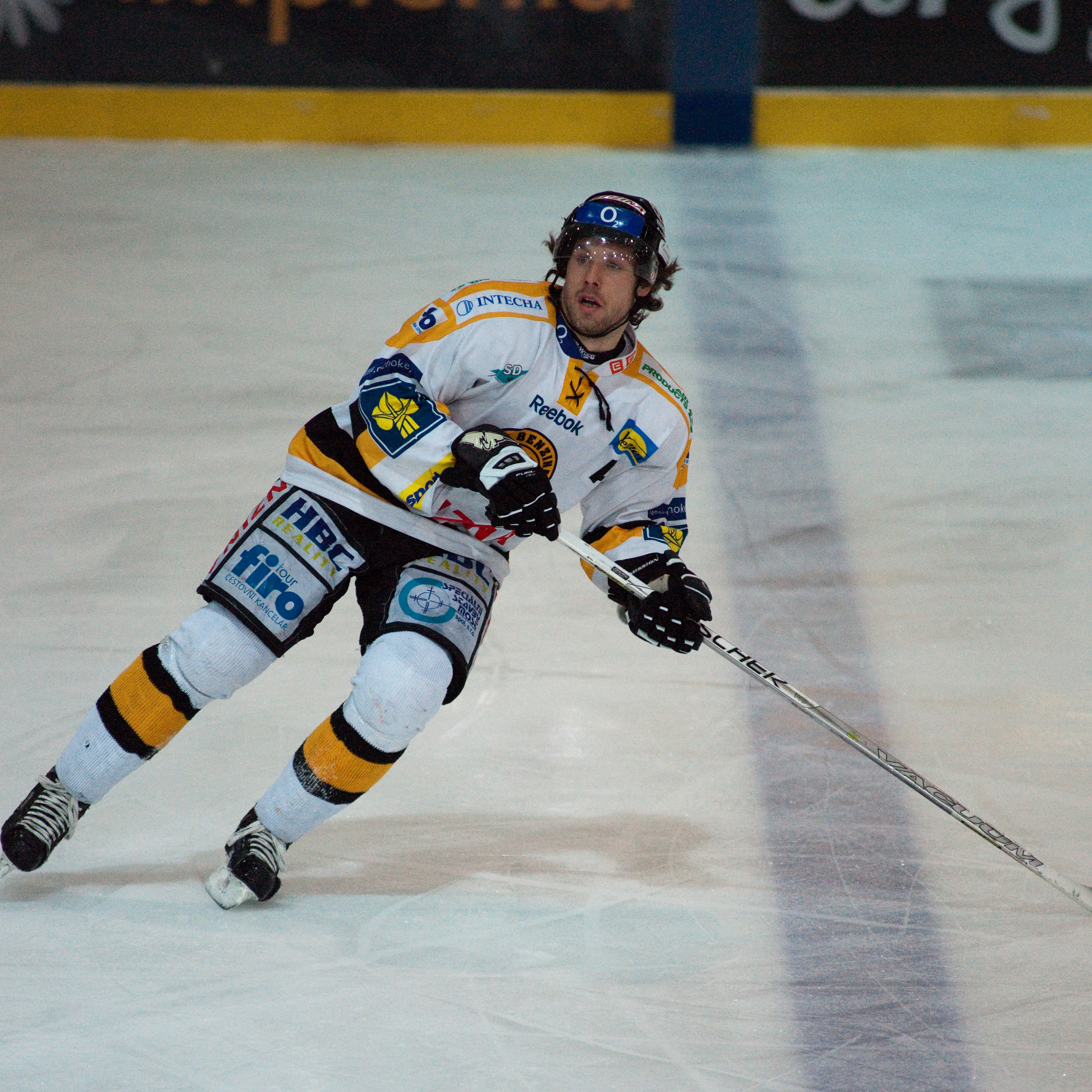
- Born: March 14, 1980 (age 46) Děčín, Czechoslovakia
- Height: 6 ft 1 in (185 cm)
- Weight: 207 lb (94 kg; 14 st 11 lb)
- Position: Left wing
- Shoots: Left
- Czech Extraliga team Former teams: HC Litvínov; St. John's Maple Leafs; HC Zlín
- NHL draft: 228th overall, 1998; Toronto Maple Leafs
- Playing career: 1998–present

Michal Trávníček (born March 14, 1980) is a Czech professional ice hockey player. He was selected by the Toronto Maple Leafs in the 8th round (228th overall) of the 1998 NHL entry draft.

Trávníček has played with HC Litvínov in the Czech Extraliga since the 1998–99 Czech Extraliga season. He has also played few regular seasons games for HC Zlín in the 2005–06 season. In 2000, two years after his NHL draft year, he went to play for Toronto's AHL affiliate St. John's Maple Leafs. He played there during two seasons, the whole 2000–01 AHL season and part of the 2001–02 season during which he returned to the Czech Extraliga and HC Litvínov.

Trávníček has played for the Czech Republic men's national ice hockey team in the Euro Hockey Tour. He has also played for the Czech Republic men's national junior ice hockey team. In November 1999, in a game against Sweden in Helsinki, Trávníček attacked Swedish forward Mattias Weinhandl, whose left eye was injured after being struck with the blade of Trávníček's stick. After the incident, Trávníček was suspended from international hockey for three years by the International Ice Hockey Federation. The Swede was permanently injured in the eye and only has 10% vision, despite Trávníček's doing, he managed to play several games in the NHL. Less than a year before, in the 1999 World Junior Ice Hockey Championships, he was suspended for two games after spitting on a linesman.

== Playing career ==
- 1998/1999 HC Chemopetrol Litvínov
- 1999/2000 HC Chemopetrol Litvínov
- 2000/2001 St. John's Maple Leafs (AHL)
- 2001/2002 St. John's Maple Leafs (AHL), 2001/2002 HC Chemopetrol Litvínov
- 2002/2003 HC Chemopetrol Litvínov
- 2003/2004 HC Chemopetrol Litvínov
- 2004/2005 HC Chemopetrol Litvínov
- 2005/2006 HC Chemopetrol Litvínov, PSG Zlín
- 2006/2007 HC Chemopetrol Litvínov
- 2007/2008 HC Litvínov, HC Havířov
- 2008/2009 HC Litvínov
- 2009/2010 HC Benzina Litvínov
- 2010/2011 HC Benzina Litvínov
- 2011/2012 HC Verva Litvínov
- 2012/2013 HC Verva Litvínov
- 2013/2014 HC Verva Litvínov
