= Axel Eidstedt =

Swedish ice hockey player

- Born: March 18, 1995 (age 30) Gothenburg, Sweden
- Height: 6 ft 2 in (188 cm)
- Weight: 225 lb (102 kg; 16 st 1 lb)
- Position: Defence
- Shot: Left
- Played for: HV71; Modo Hockey; Vålerenga; HC Dalen
- Playing career: 2014–2023

Axel Eidstedt (born March 18, 1995) is a Swedish professional ice hockey defenceman. He is currently playing for Vålerenga of the GET-ligaen.

Eidstedt made his Swedish Hockey League debut playing with HV71 during the 2013–14 SHL season.

== Career statistics ==
			Regular season					Playoffs
Season	Team	League	GP	G	A	Pts	PIM	GP	G	A	Pts	PIM
2009–10	HV71 U16	U16 SM	3	1	0	1	0	—	—	—	—	—
2010–11	HV71 U16	U16 SM	3	0	0	0	12	—	—	—	—	—
2010–11	HV71 J18	J18 Elit	13	0	0	0	8	—	—	—	—	—
2010–11	HV71 J18	J18 Allsvenskan	5	0	2	2	27	—	—	—	—	—
2011–12	HV71 J18	J18 Elit	21	1	2	3	22	—	—	—	—	—
2011–12	HV71 J18	J18 Allsvenskan	18	1	1	2	43	3	0	0	0	0
2012–13	HV71 J18	J18 Elit	6	1	4	5	35	—	—	—	—	—
2012–13	HV71 J20	J20 SuperElit	35	0	2	2	118	—	—	—	—	—
2013–14	HV71 J20	J20 SuperElit	37	1	2	3	139	6	0	0	0	22
2013–14	HV71	SHL	11	0	1	1	8	4	0	1	1	2
2013–14	Nittorps IK	Hockeyettan	4	2	0	2	2	—	—	—	—	—
2014–15	HV71 J20	J20 SuperElit	3	0	0	0	10	2	0	0	0	4
2014–15	HV71	SHL	26	0	2	2	20	—	—	—	—	—
2015–16	HV71 J20	J20 SuperElit	1	0	0	0	4	—	—	—	—	—
2015–16	HV71	SHL	41	1	0	1	34	2	0	0	0	2
2016–17	MODO Hockey	HockeyAllsvenskan	41	0	4	4	61	—	—	—	—	—
2017–18	Vålerenga Ishockey	Norway	39	2	8	10	93	5	0	0	0	4
2018–19	Vålerenga Ishockey	Norway	47	1	9	10	61	11	0	0	0	8
2019–20	Vålerenga Ishockey	Norway	5	0	0	0	0	—	—	—	—	—
2020–21	Vålerenga Ishockey	Norway	23	0	0	0	61	—	—	—	—	—
2021–22	HC Dalen	Hockeyettan	40	1	4	5	65	15	1	2	3	2
2022–23	HC Dalen	Hockeyettan	36	0	3	3	49	3	0	0	0	2
SHL totals			78	1	3	4	62	6	0	1	1	4
Norway totals			114	3	17	20	215	16	0	0	0	12
HockeyAllsvenskan totals			41	0	4	4	61	—	—	—	—	—
Hockeyettan totals			80	3	7	10	116	18	1	2	3	4
