= Jimmy Andersson =

Swedish professional ice hockey player

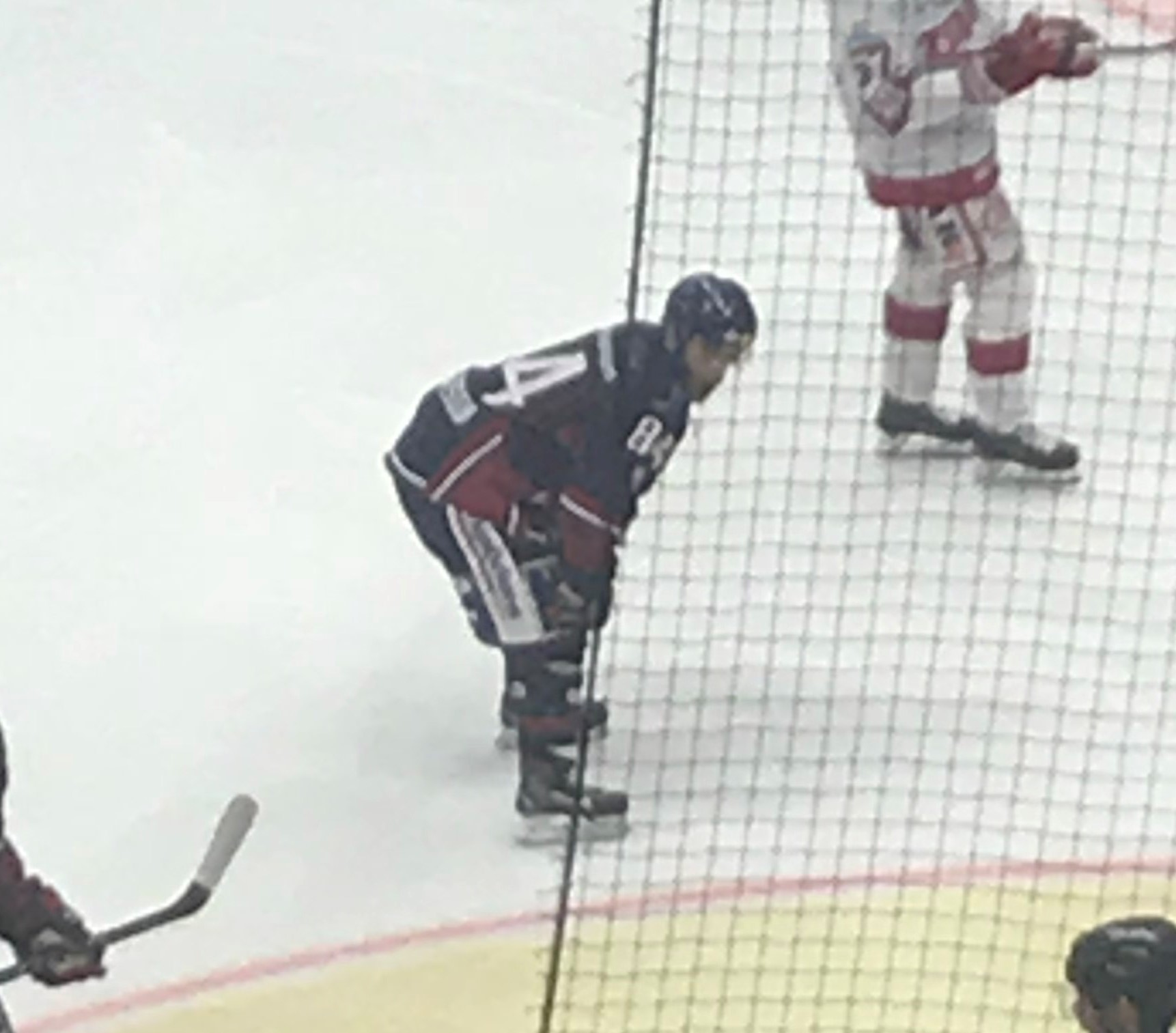
- Born: August 29, 1989 (age 35); Stockholm, Sweden
- Height: 5 ft 9 in (175 cm)
- Weight: 201 lb (91 kg; 14 st 5 lb)
- Position: Forward
- Shoots: Left
- SHL team Former teams: Free Agent; HV71; Karlskrona HK; Linköping HC
- Playing career: 2008–present

Jimmy Andersson (born 29 August 1989) is a Swedish professional ice hockey player. He is currently an unrestricted free agent who most recently played with Linköping HC of the Swedish Hockey League (SHL).

== Playing career ==
Andersson made his Swedish Hockey League debut playing with HV71 during the 2007–08 Elitserien season.

During the 2018–19 season, on 27 December 2018, Andersson agreed to a three-year contract extension to remain with Linköping HC through 2022.

At the conclusion of his contract upon completion of the 2021–22 season, Andersson ended his five-year tenure with Linköping HC in leaving as a free agent.

== International play ==
Andersson won bronze with the Swedish national under-18 team at the 2007 IIHF World U18 Championships.

== Personal ==
Andersson is the younger brother of Emilia Andersson Ramboldt, three-time Olympian and former captain of the Swedish women's national ice hockey team.
