= Christopher Mastomäki =

Swedish ice hockey player

- Born: December 8, 1996 (age 28); Nacka, Sweden
- Height: 6 ft 4 in (193 cm)
- Weight: 192 lb (87 kg; 13 st 10 lb)
- Position: Centre
- Shoots: Left
- SHL team Former teams: Örebro HK; Luleå HF
- Playing career: 2013–present

Christopher Mastomäki (born December 8, 1996) is a Swedish professional ice hockey player. He is currently playing with Örebro HK of the Swedish Hockey League (SHL).

Mastomäki made his Swedish Hockey League debut playing with Luleå HF during the 2015–16 SHL season.
