= Victor Ekarv =

Swedish ice hockey player

- Born: January 31, 1994 (age 31) Uppsala, Sweden
- Height: 5 ft 11 in (180 cm)
- Weight: 181 lb (82 kg; 12 st 13 lb)
- Position: Center
- Shot: Left
- team Former teams: Free Agent; AIK IF; Luleå HF
- NHL draft: Undrafted
- Playing career: 2013–2020

Victor Ekarv (born January 31, 1994) is a Swedish professional ice hockey player. He is currently an unrestricted free agent who was most recently under contract with Luleå HF of the Swedish Hockey League (SHL).

Ekarv made his Swedish Hockey League debut playing with AIK IF during the 2013–14 SHL season.

== Career statistics ==
| | | | Regular season | | | | | Playoffs |
| Season | Team | League | GP | G | A | Pts | PIM | GP | G | A | Pts | PIM |
|---|---|---|---|---|---|---|---|---|---|---|---|---|
| 2009–10 | Wings HC Arlanda U16 | U16 SM | 6 | 0 | 2 | 2 | 0 | — | — | — | — | — |
| 2010–11 | Almtuna IS J18 | J18 Div.1 | 4 | 3 | 3 | 6 | 0 | — | — | — | — | — |
| 2010–11 | Almtuna IS J18 | J18 Elit | 25 | 10 | 4 | 14 | 10 | — | — | — | — | — |
| 2011–12 | Almtuna IS J18 | J18 Elit | 17 | 16 | 24 | 40 | 12 | — | — | — | — | — |
| 2011–12 | Almtuna IS J18 | J18 Allsvenskan | 16 | 7 | 8 | 15 | 4 | — | — | — | — | — |
| 2011–12 | Almtuna IS J20 | J20 Elit | 3 | 1 | 1 | 2 | 2 | — | — | — | — | — |
| 2012–13 | AIK IF J20 | J20 SuperElit | 45 | 20 | 20 | 40 | 12 | 3 | 0 | 0 | 0 | 0 |
| 2013–14 | AIK IF J20 | J20 SuperElit | 41 | 17 | 38 | 55 | 20 | 2 | 1 | 0 | 1 | 2 |
| 2013–14 | AIK IF | SHL | 12 | 1 | 0 | 1 | 0 | — | — | — | — | — |
| 2013–14 | Almtuna IS | HockeyAllsvenskan | 5 | 1 | 1 | 2 | 2 | — | — | — | — | — |
| 2014–15 | AIK IF | HockeyAllsvenskan | 33 | 7 | 10 | 17 | 6 | — | — | — | — | — |
| 2014–15 | Luleå HF J20 | J20 SuperElit | 3 | 0 | 1 | 1 | 2 | — | — | — | — | — |
| 2014–15 | Luleå HF | SHL | 8 | 0 | 1 | 1 | 2 | 3 | 0 | 0 | 0 | 0 |
| 2014–15 | Asplöven HC | HockeyAllsvenskan | 9 | 2 | 2 | 4 | 0 | — | — | — | — | — |
| 2015–16 | Luleå HF | SHL | 12 | 0 | 1 | 1 | 0 | — | — | — | — | — |
| 2015–16 | Asplöven HC | HockeyAllsvenskan | 16 | 1 | 6 | 7 | 4 | — | — | — | — | — |
| 2016–17 | Almtuna IS | HockeyAllsvenskan | 40 | 6 | 12 | 18 | 6 | — | — | — | — | — |
| 2016–17 | AIK IF | HockeyAllsvenskan | 7 | 4 | 1 | 5 | 0 | 8 | 0 | 0 | 0 | 0 |
| 2017–18 | AIK IF | HockeyAllsvenskan | 11 | 1 | 0 | 1 | 2 | — | — | — | — | — |
| 2017–18 | MODO Hockey | HockeyAllsvenskan | 34 | 6 | 8 | 14 | 12 | — | — | — | — | — |
| 2018–19 | BIK Karlskoga | HockeyAllsvenskan | 24 | 1 | 2 | 3 | 0 | — | — | — | — | — |
| 2018–19 | Wings HC Arlanda | Division 2 | 1 | 1 | 1 | 2 | 0 | 7 | 2 | 3 | 5 | 0 |
| 2019–20 | SK Iron | Division 3 | — | — | — | — | — | 1 | 0 | 1 | 1 | 0 |
| SHL totals | | | 32 | 1 | 2 | 3 | 2 | 3 | 0 | 0 | 0 | 0 |
| HockeyAllsvenskan totals | | | 179 | 29 | 42 | 71 | 32 | 8 | 0 | 0 | 0 | 0 |
