= Jacob Berglund =

Swedish ice hockey player (born 1991)

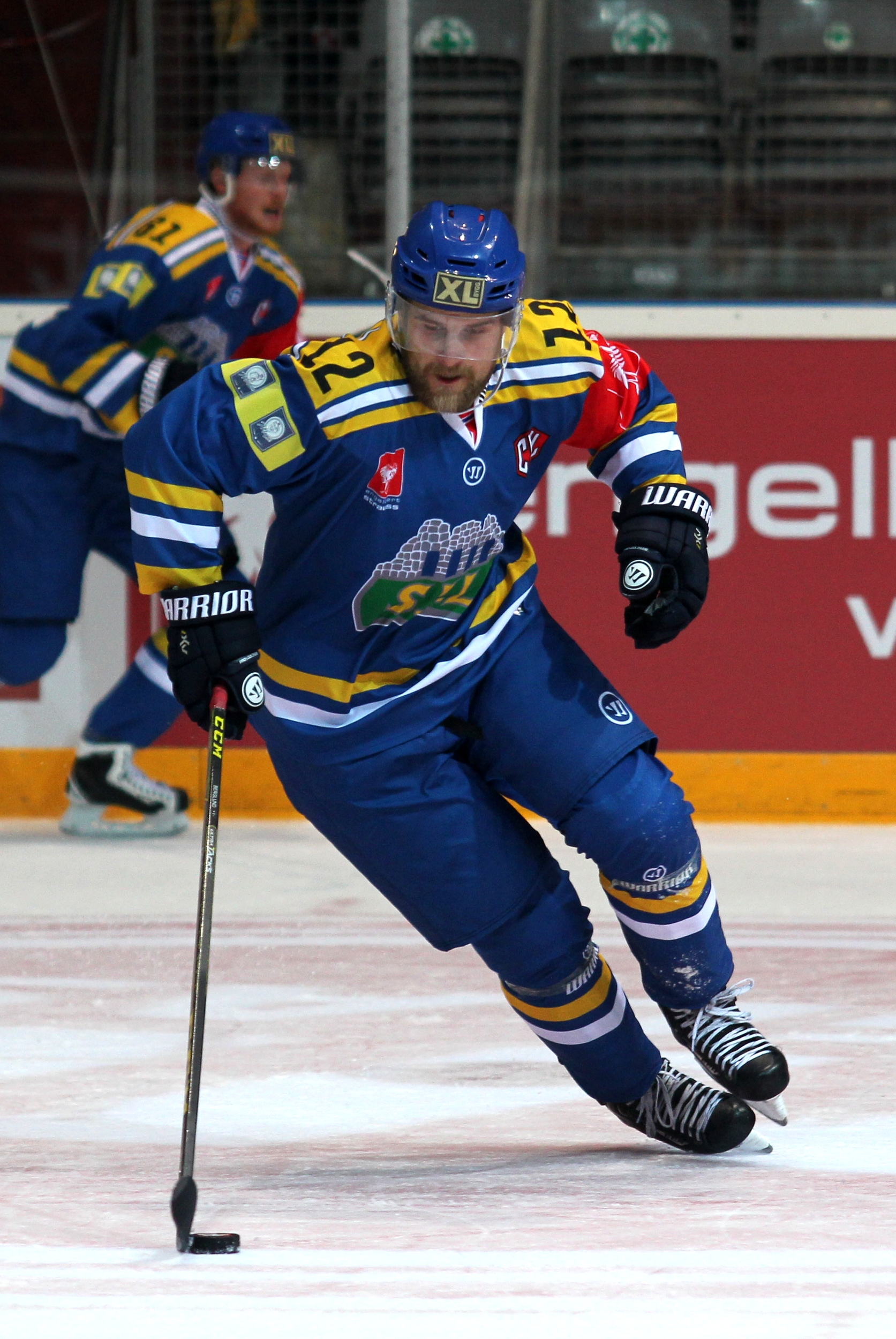
- Born: 17 November 1991 (age 34) Malmö, Sweden
- Height: 6 ft 1 in (185 cm)
- Weight: 203 lb (92 kg; 14 st 7 lb)
- Position: Centre
- Shoots: Left
- Norway team Former teams: Storhamar Dragons; Malmö Redhawks; IF Troja/Ljungby; Storhamar Ishockey; ERC Ingolstadt; Krefeld Pinguine; Dinamo Riga; Neftekhimik Nizhnekamsk; Traktor Chelyabinsk; Severstal Cherepovets; Barys Nur-Sultan
- National team: Norway
- NHL draft: Undrafted
- Playing career: 2009–present

Jacob Berglund (born 17 November 1991) is a Norwegian-Swedish professional ice hockey player who is a centre for Storhamar Dragons of the EliteHockey Ligaen.

== Playing career ==
Berglund began his career with his hometown team the Malmö Redhawks, playing in their various junior team setups before playing in the HockeyAllsvenskan, Sweden's second-tier ice hockey league, in the 2008–09 season. He then went to play in the junior Canadian Hockey League the following year, where he was selected by the Western Hockey League's Portland Winterhawks in the 2009 CHL Import Draft.

He would split his first season in the WHL between the Winterhawks and Lethbridge Hurricanes, having been traded to the Hurricanes on 11 January 2010 for future NHL player Luca Sbisa. He then spent a full season with Lethbridge before returning to Sweden in 2011, signing for IF Troja-Ljungby of HockeyAllsvenskan.

Berglund spent three years with Troja-Ljungby before moving to Norway to sign for Storhamar Ishockey of the GET-ligaen on 20 September 2014. He would scored 65 goals and 137 points in 111 games in his two seasons with Storhamar, becoming the league's Player of the Year in 2016. He moved to Switzerland, signing for HC Red Ice of the National League B on 6 June 2016. He scored 26 goals and 66 points in 48 games in his one season for the team before moving to Germany's Deutsche Eishockey Liga, signing for ERC Ingolstadt on 2 April 2017.

Berglund endured a difficult season in the DEL, managing just four goals and ten points in 49 games. He would be released and he subsequently returned to Storhamar on 14 February 2018 to finish the 2017–18 season with them. He would then return to the DEL for the 2018–19 season, joining the Krefeld Pinguine. He produced a much improved season, with 32 goals and 52 points from 51 games. On 1 May 2019 Berglund moved to Dinamo Riga of the KHL.

Berglund opened the 2019–20 season, playing only 8 games with Riga before he moved to HC Neftekhimik Nizhnekamsk on 12 October 2019. He quickly adapted with Neftekhimik, adding 13 goals and 25 points in 43 games.

On 19 May 2020, Berglund continued his tenure in the KHL, securing a one-year contract with Traktor Chelyabinsk. Berglund registered 6 points through 13 games with Traktor in the 2020–21 season before he was traded to his fourth KHL club, Severstal Cherepovets, in exchange for financial compensation and the rights to Ludvig Byström on 12 December 2020.

Medal record

Men's ice hockey

Representing Norway

World Championships
Bronze medal – third place	2026 Switzerland	
