= Juho Keränen =

Finnish ice hockey player (born 1985)

- Born: April 7, 1985 (age 40); Keitele, Finland
- Height: 5 ft 9 in (175 cm)
- Weight: 196 lb (89 kg; 14 st 0 lb)
- Position: Forward
- Shoots: Right
- Liiga team Former teams: HIFK; Oulun Kärpät; HPK; Lukko
- NHL draft: Undrafted
- Playing career: 2005–present

Juho Keränen (born April 7, 1985) is a Finnish professional ice hockey player. He is currently playing for HIFK of the Finnish Liiga.

Keränen made his SM-liiga debut playing with Oulun Kärpät during the 2005–06 SM-liiga season.
