= Marcus Oskarsson =

Swedish ice hockey player

- Born: September 20, 1993 (age 32) Kiruna, Sweden
- Height: 6 ft 2 in (188 cm)
- Weight: 192 lb (87 kg; 13 st 10 lb)
- Position: Defence
- Shoots: Right
- GET team Former teams: Frisk Asker; Luleå HF; Asplöven HC; Almtuna IS; Modo Hockey; Södertälje SK; Kalix UHC
- NHL draft: Undrafted
- Playing career: 2013–present

Marcus Oskarsson (born September 20, 1993) is a Swedish ice hockey defenceman. He is currently playing with Frisk Asker of the Norwegian GET-ligaen.

Oskarsson made his Swedish Hockey League debut playing with Luleå HF during the 2012–13 season.
