= Jan Buchtele =

Czech professional ice hockey forward

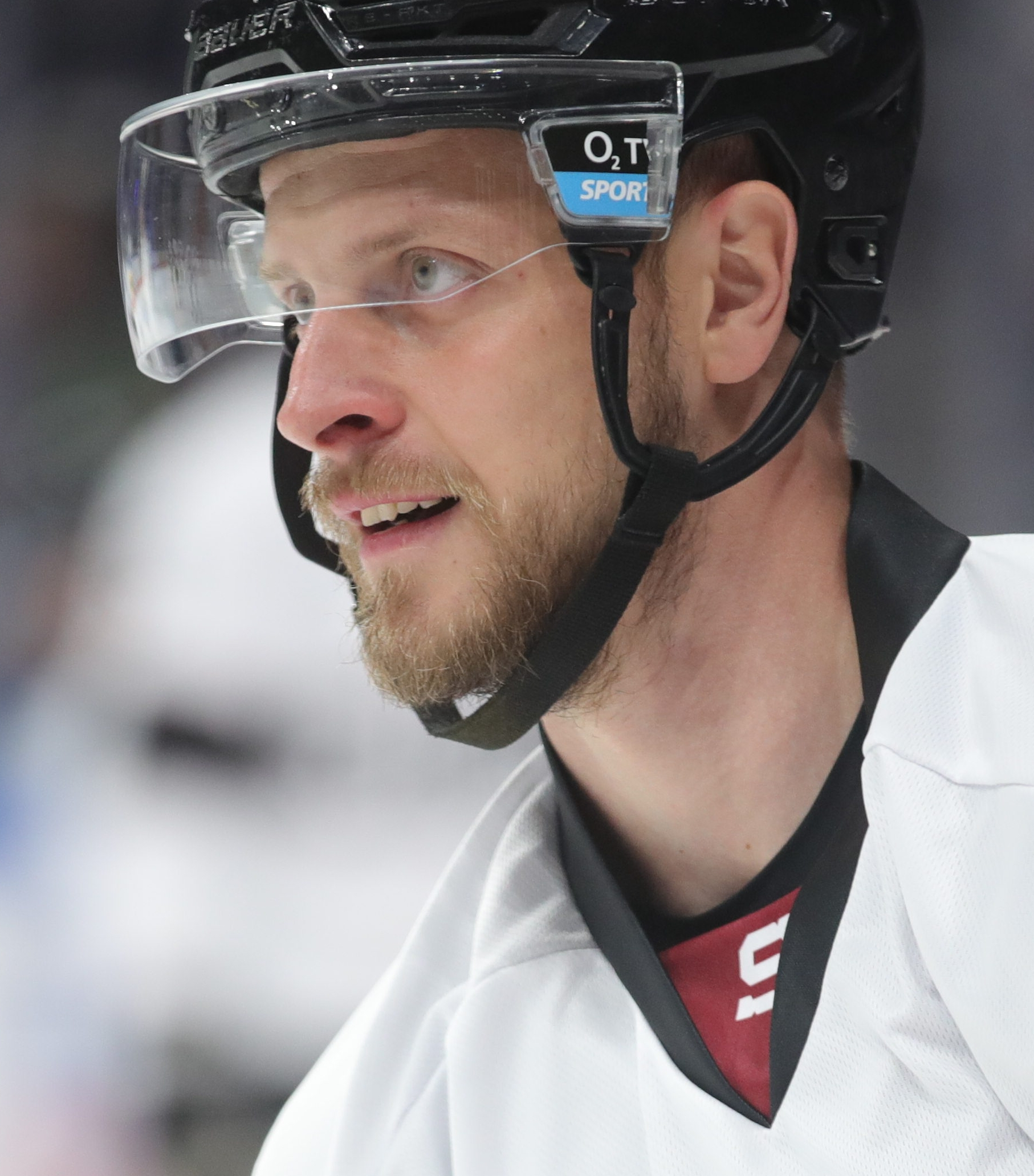
- Buchtele in 2023
- Born: July 21, 1990 (age 34); Hradec Králové, Czechoslovakia
- Height: 6 ft 1 in (185 cm)
- Weight: 209 lb (95 kg; 14 st 13 lb)
- Position: Forward
- Shoots: Left
- ELH team Former teams: HC Sparta Praha; HC Dynamo Pardubice; Avtomobilist Yekaterinburg; HC Slovan Bratislava
- Playing career: 2009–present

Jan Buchtele (born July 21, 1990) is a Czech professional ice hockey forward. He currently plays for HC Sparta Praha of the Czech Extraliga (ELH).

He returned for his third tenure with Sparta Praha during the 2017–18 season, leaving HC Slovan Bratislava in the Kontinental Hockey League after producing 11 points in 41 games on January 19, 2018.
