= Mika Niemi =

Finnish ice hockey player

- Born: 10 March 1988 (age 38) Pori, Finland
- Height: 6 ft 1 in (185 cm)
- Weight: 192 lb (87 kg; 13 st 10 lb)
- Position: Forward
- Shoots: Left
- Playing career: 2009–present

Mika Niemi (born 10 March 1988) is a Finnish retired ice hockey forward.

Niemi has formerly played with Ässät Pori and Oulun Kärpät of the Finnish Liiga. Following the 2017–18 season, his second with Jokerit, Niemi agreed to a one-year contract extension on 9 April 2018.

== KHL's longest match ==
On 22 March 2018 Niemi scored the overtime goal against CSKA Moscow, ending the longest match in the league's history after 2 hours and 36 minutes of play.
