= Petr Chaloupka =

Czech professional ice hockey defenceman

- Born: April 4, 1986 (age 40)
- Height: 6 ft 1 in (185 cm)
- Weight: 179 lb (81 kg; 12 st 11 lb)
- Position: Defence
- Shoots: Left
- Hockeytvåan team: Grästorps IK
- NHL draft: Undrafted
- Playing career: 2006–present

Petr Chaloupka (born April 4, 1986) is a Czech professional ice hockey defenceman currently signed to Hockeytvåan side Grästorps IK. Chaloupka most recently played with Podhale Nowy Targ in the Polska Hokej Liga. He previously played with Dundee Stars in the Elite Ice Hockey League during the 2018–19 season.
