= Fredrik Forsberg (ice hockey, born June 1996) =

Swedish professional ice hockey player

- Born: 6 June 1996 (age 29)
- Height: 6 ft 0 in (183 cm)
- Weight: 196 lb (89 kg; 14 st 0 lb)
- Position: Forward
- Shoots: Left
- Allsv team Former teams: Djurgårdens IF; Leksands IF
- Playing career: 2015–present

Fredrik Forsberg (born 6 June 1996) is a Swedish professional ice hockey player. He is currently playing with Djurgårdens IF of the HockeyAllsvenskan (Allsv).

== Playing career ==
Forsberg made his Swedish Hockey League debut playing with Djurgårdens IF against Skellefteå AIK on 19 September 2015. He scored the game-winning goal for Djurgården against Växjö Lakers in the round of 32 of the 2015–16 Champions Hockey League.

Forsberg played three seasons in the HockeyAllsvenskan with Almtuna IS, before making a return to the SHL for the 2019–20 season, signing a two-year contract with newly promoted Leksands IF on 17 April 2019.
