= 2014–15 Liiga season =

2014–15 SM-liiga
- League: SM-liiga
- Sport: Ice hockey
- Duration: September 2014 – April 2015
- Teams: 14
- TV partner: Nelonen

Regular season
- Best record: Oulun Kärpät
- Runners-up: Tappara
- Season MVP: Kim Hirschovits
- Top scorer: Kim Hirschovits

Playoffs
- Playoffs MVP: Joonas Donskoi
- Finals champions: Oulun Kärpät
- Runners-up: Tappara

SM-liiga seasons
- ← 2013–14 2015–16 →

The 2014–15 SM-liiga season was the 40th season of the SM-liiga, the top level of ice hockey in Finland, since the league's formation in 1975.

== Teams ==
Team	City	Head coach	Arena	Capacity	Captain
Ässät	Pori	Pekka Rautakallio	Porin jäähalli	6,466	Ville Uusitalo
Blues	Espoo	Jyrki Aho	Barona Areena	7,017	Kim Hirschovits
HIFK	Helsinki	Antti Törmänen	Helsingin jäähalli	8,200	Toni Söderholm
HPK	Hämeenlinna	Pasi Arvonen	Patria-areena	5,360	Joonas Vihko
Ilves	Tampere	Tuomas Toukkola	Tampereen jäähalli	7,600	Sami Sandell
JYP	Jyväskylä	Marko Virtanen	Jyväskylän jäähalli	4,500	Eric Perrin
KalPa	Kuopio	Pekka Virta	Kuopion jäähalli	5,064	Mikko Jokela
Kärpät	Oulu	Lauri Marjamäki	Oulun Energia Areena	6,614	Lasse Kukkonen
Lukko	Rauma	Risto Dufva	Äijänsuo Arena	5,400	Ilkka Mikkola
Pelicans	Lahti	Tomi Lämsä	Isku Areena	5,530	Juha Leimu
SaiPa	Lappeenranta	Pekka Tirkkonen	Kisapuisto	4,825	Ville Koho
Sport	Vaasa	Tomek Valtonen	Vaasa Arena	4,448	Miko Malkamäki
Tappara	Tampere	Jussi Tapola	Tampereen jäähalli	7,600	Jukka Peltola
TPS	Turku	~~Kai Suikkanen~~; 7 Nov 2014; ~~Miika Elomo~~; 17 Feb 2015; Jarno Pikkarainen	Turkuhalli	11,820	Petteri Nummelin

== Regular season ==
Top six advanced straight to quarter-finals, while teams between 7th and 10th positions played wild card round for the final two spots. The SM-liiga is a closed series and thus there is no relegation.

Team	GP	W	OTW	OTL	L	GF	GA	+/−	P
Kärpät	60	31	9	4	16	167	126	+41	115
Tappara	60	28	7	8	17	155	123	+32	106
Lukko	60	24	7	17	12	163	147	+16	103
JYP	60	28	5	8	19	174	151	+23	102
Blues	60	25	11	3	21	166	149	+17	100
KalPa	60	25	8	6	21	134	115	+19	97
HIFK	60	24	9	6	21	177	150	+27	96
SaiPa	60	23	9	7	21	151	146	+5	94
Ässät	60	23	6	9	22	151	143	+8	90
Ilves	60	24	5	6	25	150	161	-11	88
HPK	60	15	12	7	26	143	165	-22	76
Pelicans	60	16	6	8	30	125	166	-41	68
TPS	60	17	3	8	32	122	172	-50	65
Sport	60	15	5	5	35	121	185	-64	60

== Playoffs ==
=== Bracket ===
Wild-card round (best-of-3)
7	HIFK	2
10	Ilves	0
8	SaiPa	2
9	Ässät	0

Quarter-finals (best-of-7)
1	Kärpät	4
8	SaiPa	1
2	Tappara	4
7	HIFK	2
3	Lukko	4
6	KalPa	2
4	JYP	4
5	Blues	0

Semi-finals (best-of-7)
1	Kärpät	4
4	JYP	3
(Pairings are re-seeded after the first and second round)
2	Tappara	4
3	Lukko	3

Finals (best-of-7)
1	Kärpät	4
2	Tappara	3
Bronze medal game
3	Lukko	0
4	JYP	1

=== Wild card round (best-of-three) ===
==== (7) HIFK vs. (10) Ilves ====
14 March 2015; 17:00	HIFK	2–1 (0–0, 2–1, 0–0)	Ilves	Helsinki Ice Hall, Helsinki; Attendance: 5,218

Game reference

Kevin Lankinen
Goalies
Joonas Korpisalo
Referees:
Antti Boman
Stefan Fonselius
Linesmen:
Markus Hägerström
Sakari Suominen

T. Söderholm (T. Ramstedt, T. Záborský) (PP) – 25:02	1–0
T. Záborský (J. Rask, Matti Kuparinen) – 32:27	2–0
	2–1	33:48 – A. Tyrväinen (V. Polák)

20 min
Penalties
24 min
31
Shots
22

15 March 2015; 17:00	Ilves	1–2 4OT (0–0, 1–0, 0–1, 0–0, 0–0, 0–0, 0–1)	HIFK	Tampere Ice Stadium, Tampere; Attendance: 5,137

Game reference

Joonas Korpisalo
Goalies
Kevin Lankinen
Referees:
Jari Levonen
Petri Lindqvist
Linesmen:
Jani Pesonen
Teemu Riikonen

S. Zalewski – 21:37	1–0
	1–1	42:07 – A. Luttinen (L. Taipalus, T. Ramstedt) (PP)
	1–2	134:14 – M. Partanen (Y. Auvitu)

34 min
Penalties
54 min
60
Shots
50

HIFK wins the series 2-0.

==== (8) SaiPa vs. (9) Ässät ====
14 March 2015; 17:00	SaiPa	6–0 (0–0, 2–0, 4–0)	Ässät	Kisapuisto, Lappeenranta; Attendance: 2,847

Game reference

Jussi Markkanen
Goalies
Juuso Riksman
Rasmus Rinne
Referees:
Jukka Hakkarainen
Mikko Kaukokari
Linesmen:
Iikka Kiilunen
Joonas Saha

P. Bjorkstrand (J. Mankinen) – 31:35	1–0
S. Venäläinen (V. Hämäläinen) – 33:38	2–0
S. Backman (M. Vainonen, V. Hämäläinen) – 44:34	3–0
V. Virkkunen (M. Vainonen) – 50:38	4–0
C. Rau (M. Järvinen, D. McIntyre) – 52:22	5–0
M. Järvinen (C. Rau, B. Salcido) (PP) – 54:53	6–0

16 min
Penalties
16 min
35
Shots
27

15 March 2015; 17:00	Ässät	1–2 1OT (1–1, 0–0, 0–0, 0–1)	SaiPa	Porin jäähalli, Pori; Attendance: 3,465

Game reference

Juuso Riksman
Goalies
Jussi Markkanen
Referees:
Timo Favorin
Anssi Salonen
Linesmen:
Pasi Nieminen
Masi Puolakka

V. Viljanen (H. Heino, A. Saarela) – 01:57	1–0
	1–1	06:51 – S. Lofquist (B. Salcido, D. McIntyre) (PP)
	1–2	64:26 – C. Rau (R. Ahonen, M. Järvinen)

6 min
Penalties
6 min
35
Shots
41

SaiPa wins the series 2-0.

=== Quarterfinals (best-of-seven) ===
==== (1) Kärpät vs. (8) SaiPa ====
20 March 2015; 18:30	Kärpät	4–2 (2–0, 1–1, 1–1)	SaiPa	Oulun Energia Areena, Oulu; Attendance: 6,005

Game reference

Tomi Karhunen
Goalies
Andreas Bernard
Referees:
Mikko Kaukokari
Tom Laaksonen
Linesmen:
Samuli Orava
Harri Perämäki

J. Kemppainen (J. Junttila, A. Vallin) – 11:29	1–0
M. Pyörälä (J. Donskoi, A. Laatikainen) (PP) – 16:17	2–0
J. Kemppainen (J. Donskoi, R. Glenn) – 28:21	3–0
	3–1	31:16 – J. Larsson (D. McIntyre, P. Bjorkstrand) (PP)
	3–2	46:07 – D. McIntyre (C.Rau)
J. Junttila (J. Donskoi, J. Kemppainen) (EN) – 59:30	4–2

14 min
Penalties
6 min
29
Shots
25

21 March 2015; 17:00	SaiPa	5–3 (4–2, 0–1, 1–0)	Kärpät	Kisapuisto, Lappeenranta; Attendance: 3,937

Game reference

Andreas Bernard
Goalies
Tomi Karhunen
Iiro Tarkki
Referees:
Antti Boman
Anssi Salonen
Linesmen:
Tommi Niittylä
Henri Tukia

V. Virkkunen (M. Flinck, S. Backman) – 01:50	1–0
C. Rau (D. McIntyre, J. Larsson) – 04:08	2–0
	2–1	06:05 – E. Pirnes (J. Donskoi) (PP)
S. Lofquist (B. Salcido, D. McIntyre) (PP) – 09:35	3–1
	3–2	10:03 – J. Kemppainen (A. Vallin, J. Donskoi)
J. Larsson (P. Bjorkstrand, R. Ahonen) (PP) – 12:33	4–2
	4–3	31:41 – L. Kašpar (E. Pirnes, R. Glenn)
S. Lofquist (S. Venäläinen, V. Hämäläinen) – 43:23	5–3

83 min
Penalties
91 min
26
Shots
32

24 March 2015; 18:30	Kärpät	1–0 (0–0, 1–0, 0–0)	SaiPa	Oulun Energia Areena, Oulu; Attendance: 5,502

Game reference
Iiro Tarkki	Goalies	Andreas Bernard	Referees: Mikko Kaukokari; Tom Laaksonen; Linesmen: Samuli Orava; Harri Perämäki
P. Davis (A. Laatikainen) – 26:40 / 1–0			Referees: Mikko Kaukokari; Tom Laaksonen; Linesmen: Samuli Orava; Harri Perämäki
10 min	Penalties	10 min	Referees: Mikko Kaukokari; Tom Laaksonen; Linesmen: Samuli Orava; Harri Perämäki
21	Shots	22	Referees: Mikko Kaukokari; Tom Laaksonen; Linesmen: Samuli Orava; Harri Perämäki

26 March 2015; 18:30	SaiPa	2–5 (1–1, 0–0, 1–4)	Kärpät	Kisapuisto, Lappeenranta; Attendance: 4,357

Game reference

Jussi Markkanen
Goalies
Iiro Tarkki
Referees:
Mikko Kaukokari
Tom Laaksonen
Linesmen:
Jani Pesonen
Teemu Riikonen

	0–1	08:38 – J. Kemppainen (J. Junttila, M. Niemelä)
M. Flinck (J. Larsson, T. Leivo) – 09:53	1–1
C. Rau (R. Ahonen, D. McIntyre) – 44:32	2–1
	2–2	47:27 – B. Maxwell (S. Manninen)
	2–3	50:04 – J. Donskoi (A. Masuhr, A. Laatikainen) (PP)
	2–4	51:37 – J. Donskoi (J. Junttila, J. Kemppainen)
	2–5	59:52 –B. Maxwell (M. Pyörälä, L. Kukkonen) (EN)

14 min
Penalties
8 min
41
Shots
38

28 March 2015; 17:00	Kärpät	5–1 (2–0, 1–0, 2–1)	SaiPa	Oulun Energia Areena, Oulu; Attendance: 6,614

Game reference

Iiro Tarkki
Goalies
Andreas Bernard
Referees:
Antti Boman
Anssi Salonen
Linesmen:
Henri Neva
Hannu Sormunen

B. Maxwell (D. Spang) – 01:23	1–0
S. Suoranta (E. Pirnes, A. Vallin) – 18:31	2–0
S. Suoranta (J. Keränen, P. Davis) – 36:02	3–0
A. Masuhr (L. Kašpar, B. Maxwell) (PP) – 42:02	4–0
	4–1	44:25 – V. Koho (K. Maalahti, T. Jokinen)
P. Davis (A. Vallin, M. Pyörälä) (EN) – 57:40	5–1

6 min
Penalties
8 min
25
Shots
21

Kärpät wins the series 4-1.

==== (2) Tappara vs. (7) HIFK ====
20 March 2015; 18:30	Tappara	4–3 (1–0, 1–1, 2–2)	HIFK	Tampere Ice Stadium, Tampere; Attendance: 5,647

Game reference

Juha Metsola
Goalies
Kevin Lankinen
Referees:
Stefan Fonselius
Aleksi Rantala
Linesmen:
Pasi Nieminen
Sakari Suominen

O. Palola (J. Malinen, K. Kuusela) – 03:48	1–0
J. Peltola (A. Erkinjuntti, H. Tömmernes) – 21:08	2–0
	2–1	29:33 – Y. Auvitu (T. Záborský, O. Honkaheimo)
O. Palola (J. Malinen, K. Kuusela) – 40:42	3–1
	3–2	43:13 – T. Ramstedt (J. Rask, S. Blomqvist)
	3–3	53:53 – T. Ramstedt (PS) (PP)
H. Haapala (P. Jormakka, J-M Järvinen) – 55:20	4–3

6 min
Penalties
6 min
35
Shots
35

21 March 2015; 17:00	HIFK	3–4 1OT (2–3, 1–0, 0–0, 0–1)	Tappara	Helsinki Ice Hall, Helsinki; Attendance: 7,119

Game reference

Kevin Lankinen
Goalies
Juha Metsola
Referees:
Jari Levonen
Petri Lindqvist
Linesmen:
Iikka Kiilunen
Joonas Saha

J. Rask (T. Záborský, A. Luttinen) (PP) – 02:27	1–0
	1–1	02:47 – P. Jormakka (J-M Järvinen, H. Haapala)
	1–2	05:25 – J. Green (T. Aalto, J-M Järvinen) (PP)
J. Puustinen (N. Goldobin, T. Söderholm) (PP) – 09:44	2–2
	2–3	13:37 – P. Jormakka (A. Elorinne)
N. Goldobin (O. Honkaheimo, R. Leino) – 28:10	3–3
	3–4	66:09 – O. Palola (K. Kuusela, J. Malinen)

8 min
Penalties
22 min
33
Shots
19

24 March 2015; 18:30	Tappara	1–4 (0–1,1–1,0–2)	HIFK	Tampere Ice Stadium, Tampere; Attendance: 5,622

Game reference

Juha Metsola
Goalies
Kevin Lankinen
Referees:
Stefan Fonselius
Aleksi Rantala
Linesmen:
Pasi Nieminen
Sakari Suominen

	0–1	00:36 – J. Rask (D. Grillfors, T. Záborský)
K. Kuusela (J. Green, J-M Järvinen) (PP) – 30:36	1–1
	1–2	35:04 – T. Záborský (T. Ramstedt, L. Taipalus)
	1–3	57:39 – O. Honkaheimo (SH)
	1–4	59:39 – J. Rask (T. Ramstedt, T. Söderholm) (EN)

27 min
Penalties
12 min
19
Shots
26

26 March 2015; 18:30	HIFK	5–1 (2–0, 1–1, 2–0)	Tappara	Helsinki Ice Hall, Helsinki; Attendance: 7,526

Game reference

Ville Husso
Goalies
Juha Metsola
Referees:
Stefan Fonselius
Aleksi Rantala
Linesmen:
Iikka Kiilunen
Joonas Saha

M. Partanen (M. Åsten) – 01:49	1–0
Y. Auvitu (N. Goldobin, T. Söderholm) (PP) – 08:31	2–0
T. Záborský (T. Ramstedt, A. Luttinen) (PP) – 27:20	3–0
	3–1	35:00 – O. Palola (J. Malinen, K. Kuusela)
R. Leino (N. Goldobin, J. Puustinen) (EN) – 57:30	4–1
T. Záborský (D. Gillfors) (EN) – 59:33	5–1

4 min
Penalties
22 min
32
Shots
20

28 March 2015; 17:00	Tappara	2–1 (2–1,0–0,0–0)	HIFK	Tampere Ice Stadium, Tampere; Attendance: 6,336

Game reference

Juha Metsola
Goalies
Ville Husso
Referees:
Jari Levonen
Petri Lindqvist
Linesmen:
Timo Heinonen
Pasi Nieminen

M. Kankaanperä (P. Jormakka) – 04:32	1–0
	1–1	09:24 – Y. Auvitu (N. Goldobin, J. Puustinen) (PP)
J-M Järvinen (H. Haapala, P. Jormakka) – 16:38	2–1

8 min
Penalties
10 min
29
Shots
27

30 March 2015; 18:30	HIFK	3–4 1OT (1–1,2–2,0–0,0–1)	Tappara	Helsinki Ice Hall, Helsinki; Attendance: 7,418

Game reference

Ville Husso
Goalies
Juha Metsola
Referees:
Stefan Fonselius
Aleksi Rantala
Linesmen:
Iikka Kiilunen
Joonas Saha

J. Rask (A. Luttinen, T. Ramstedt) (PP) – 13:31	1–0
	1–1	19:59 – O. Palola (S. Dixon)
L. Taipalus (T. Záborský, T. Ramstedt) (PP2) – 30:38	2–1
J. Puustinen (N. Goldobin, Y. Auvitu) (PP) – 31:00	3–1
	3–2	35:49 – E. Kaksonen (P. Jormakka, K. Kuusela)
	3–3	36:12 – P. Jormakka
	3–4	74:23 – A. Erkinjuntti (A. Elorinne, H. Tömmernes)

6 min
Penalties
41 min
32
Shots
32

Tappara wins the series 4-2.

==== (3) Lukko vs. (6) KalPa ====
20 March 2015; 18:30	Lukko	3–0 (2–0, 1–0, 0–0)	KalPa	Äijänsuo Arena, Rauma; Attendance: 4,017

Game reference

Ryan Zapolski
Goalies
Andy Chiodo
Referees:
Jukka Hakkarainen
Anssi Salonen
Linesmen:
Joona Elonen
Markus Hägerström

O. Vauhkonen (H. Tikkanen, T. Koivisto) – 18:43	1–0
O. Vauhkonen (M. Kousa, Jo. Virtanen) – 19:47	2–0
A. Gagnon (V. Vahalahti, Je. Virtanen) – 31:58	3–0

8 min
Penalties
10 min
18
Shots
28

21 March 2015; 17:00	KalPa	0–3 (0–2, 0–1, 0–0)	Lukko	Data Group Areena, Kuopio; Attendance: 4,315

Game reference

Andy Chiodo
Samu Perhonen
Goalies
Ryan Zapolski
Referees:
Jussi Leppänen
Jari-Pekka Pajula
Linesmen:
Timo Heinonen
Masi Puolakka

0–1	00:52 – F. Riska (V. Nieminen, I. Mikkola)
0–2	03:44 – J. Lahti (O. Vauhkonen, T. Koivisto) (PP)
0–3	39:18 – O. Vauhkonen (H. Tikkanen, T. Koivisto) (PP)

10 min
Penalties
10 min
22
Shots
16

24 March 2015; 18:30	Lukko	3–4 1OT (0–1, 2–0, 1–2, 0–1)	KalPa	Äijänsuo Arena, Rauma; Attendance: 4,085

Game reference

Ryan Zapolski
Goalies
Samu Perhonen
Referees:
Jukka Hakkarainen
Anssi Salonen
Linesmen:
Joona Elonen
Markus Hägerström

	0–1	15:45 – S. Mutanen (M. Koivisto, K. Kapanen)
V. Vahalahti (J. Komulainen, H. Tikkanen) – 23:18	1–1
O. Vauhkonen (J. Niskala, H. Tikkanen) (PP) – 31:01	2–1
V. Vahalahti (A. Gagnon, J. Komulainen) – 40:28	3–1
	3–2	41:36 – M. Koivisto (S. Mutanen, K. Kapanen)
	3–3	53:28 – J. Riikola (J. Vuotilainen, M. Birner) (PP)
	3–4	66:37 – M. Ruohomaa (V-M Vittasmäki)

12 min
Penalties
33 min
32
Shots
31

26 March 2015; 18:30	KalPa	4–2 (2–1, 0–0, 2–1)	Lukko	Data Group Areena, Kuopio; Attendance: 4,135

Game reference

Samu Perhonen
Goalies
Ryan Zapolski
Referees:
Jussi Leppänen
Jari Levonen
Linesmen:
Henri Neva
Masi Puolakka

M. Birner (M. Ruohomaa, M. Koivisto) (PP) – 06:30	1–0
	1–1	10:50 – E. Koski
M. Ruohomaa (A. Halonen, K. Kapanen) – 14:52	2–1
	2–2	40:23 – T. Koivisto (J. Lahti, I. Mikkola)
M. Ruohomaa (K. Kapanen, S. Mutanen) – 55:28	3–2
J. Keränen (T. Kubalík, J. Rissanen) – 57:12	4–2

8 min
Penalties
4 min
26
Shots
26

28 March 2015; 17:00	Lukko	3–2 (0–0,1–0,2–2)	KalPa	Äijänsuo Arena, Rauma; Attendance: 4,008

Game reference

Ryan Zapolski
Goalies
Samu Perhonen
Referees:
Jukka Hakkarainen
Mikko Kaukokari
Linesmen:
Lauri Nikulainen
Sakari Suominen

T. Koivisto (F. Riska, J. Lahti) – 22:48	1–0
	1–1	47:31 – M. Birner (J. Voutilainen)
J. Niskala (T. Koivisto, A. Gagnon) (SH) – 50:06	2–1
	2–2	57:26 – S. Mutanen (K. Kapanen)
J. Lahti (A. Gagnon, H. Tikkanen) – 57:49	3–2

6 min
Penalties
6 min
23
Shots
22

30 March 2015; 18:30	KalPa	1–2 (0–1, 0–0, 1–1)	Lukko	Data Group Areena, Kuopio; Attendance: 4,186

Game reference

Andy Chiodo
Goalies
Ryan Zapolski
Referees:
Timo Favorin
Jari-Pekka Pajula
Linesmen:
Samuli Orava
Harri Perämäki

	0–1	15:35 – J. Lahti (O. Sipiläinen, F. Riska)
	0–2	45:58 – H. Forsberg (V. Nieminen, M. Kousa)
J. Rissanen (T. Kubalík) – 51:08	1–2

2 min
Penalties
2 min
27
Shots
23

Lukko wins the series 4-2.

==== (4) JYP vs. (5) Blues ====
20 March 2015; 18:30	JYP	3–1 (1–0, 0–1, 2–0)	Blues	Synergia-areena, Jyväskylä; Attendance: 3,356

Game reference

Tuomas Tarkki
Goalies
Eetu Laurikainen
Referees:
Timo Favorin
Jari Suorsa
Linesmen:
Henri Neva
Hannu Sormunen

P. Hubáček (A. Löfman, M. Hännikäinen) (PP) – 14:40	1–0
	1–1	35:24 – V. Westermarck (S. Giliati, V. Korhonen) (PP)
J. Tuppurainen (J. Ikonen, É. Perrin) (PP) – 41:26	2–1
M. Poukkula (EN) – 58:27	3–1

16 min
Penalties
32 min
25
Shots
26

21 March 2015; 17:00	Blues	0–3 (0–1, 0–1, 0–1)	JYP	Barona Areena, Espoo; Attendance: 4,767

Game reference

Eetu Laurikainen
Goalies
Tuomas Tarkki
Referees:
Timo Metsälä
Teemu Salminen
Linesmen:
Lauri Nikulainen
Daniel Österholm

0–1	01:17 – T. Pihlman (J. Ikonen, M. Mäenpää) (PP)
0–2	21:42 – M. Kalteva (P. Hubáček, M. Lahti)
0–3	59:13 – M. Lahti (M. Luoma) (EN)

14 min
Penalties
10 min
25
Shots
31

24 March 2015; 18:30	JYP	4–0 (1–0, 1–0, 2–0)	Blues	Synergia-areena, Jyväskylä; Attendance: 3,502

Game reference

Tuomas Tarkki
Goalies
Eetu Laurikainen
Referees:
Timo Metsälä
Teemu Salminen
Linesmen:
Jani Pesonen
Teemu Riikonen

M. Hännikäinen (P. Hubáček, M. Luoma) (PP) – 12:34	1–0
M. Hännikäinen (J. Tuppurainen, A. Löfman) – 34:28	2–0
M. Kalteva (A. Löfman, M. Hännikäinen) – 51:20	3–0
T. Pihlman (É. Perrin, M. Mäenpää) (PP) – 58:43	4–0

2 min
Penalties
8 min
36
Shots
25

26 March 2015; 18:30	Blues	4–7 (1–1, 2–2, 1–4)	JYP	Barona Areena, Espoo; Attendance: 3,972

Game reference

Eetu Laurikainen
Goalies
Tuomas Tarkki
Referees:
Timo Favorin
Jari-Pekka Pajula
Linesmen:
Tommi Niittylä
Daniel Österholm

M. Aaltonen (V. Korhonen) – 05:00	1–0
	1–1	09:00 – É. Perrin (T. Pihlman, J. Ikonen) (PP)
O. Rantakari (K. Hirschovits, V. Korhonen) (PP) – 20:29	2–1
	2–2	31:20 – M. Kauppinen (J. Tuppurainen)
	2–3	33:20 – P. Hubáček (A. Löfman, M. Luoma) (PP)
V. Korhonen (K. Hirschovits, M. Aaltonen) – 36:28	3–3
	3–4	43:02 – P. Hubáček (M. Hännikäinen, A. Löfman) (PP)
S. Liivik (S. Giliati, R. O'Connor) – 47:20	4–4
	4–5	50:12 – V. Hotakainen (M. Kalteva, P. Hubáček)
	4–6	59:16 – J. Tuppurainen (J. Pulli) (EN)
	4–7	59:39 – M. Poukkula (M. Lahti) (EN)

10 min
Penalties
20 min
17
Shots
37

JYP wins the series 4-0.

=== Semifinals (best-of-seven) ===
==== (1) Kärpät vs. (4) JYP ====
3 April 2015; 18:30	Kärpät	5–4 (1–0, 2–4, 2–0)	JYP	Oulun Energia Areena, Oulu; Attendance: 6,050

Game reference

Iiro Tarkki
Goalies
Tuomas Tarkki
Referees:
Timo Favorin
Jari-Pekka Pajula
Linesmen:
Harri Perämäki
Masi Puolakka

J. Junttila (J. Donskoi, J. Kemppainen) – 13:14	1–0
	1–1	20:21 – M. Luoma (M. Hännikäinen, J. Tuppurainen)
E. Pirnes (A. Laatikainen, J. Donskoi) (PP) – 25:13	2–1
	2–2	26:05 – M. Hännikäinen (J. Tuppurainen, A. Löfman)
	2–3	26:45 – M. Lahti (J. Ikonen, P. Hubáček)
	2–4	27:53 – J. Tuppurainen (J. Ikonen, É. Perrin) (PP)
M. Pyörälä (J. Kemppainen, J. Donskoi) (PP) – 33:42	3–4
J. Kemppainen (J. Donskoi, E. Pirnes) – 56:40	4–4
L. Kukkonen (J. Kemppainen) – 58:40	5–4

6 min
Penalties
35 min
35
Shots
27

4 April 2015; 16:00	JYP	5–4 1OT (1–2, 1–1, 2–1, 1–0)	Kärpät	Synergia-areena, Jyväskylä; Attendance: 4,365

Game reference

Tuomas Tarkki
Goalies
Iiro Tarkki
Referees:
Aleksi Rantala
Anssi Salonen
Linesmen:
Timo Heinonen
Pasi Nieminen

	0–1	05:29 – J. Kemppainen (M. Pyörälä, E. Pirnes) (PP)
M. Hännikäinen (M. Nenonen, A. Löfman) (PP) – 13:00	1–1
	1–2	14:51 – A. Masuhr (J. Junttila, J. Kemppainen)
É. Perrin (D. Boyce, M. Mäenpää) (PP) – 27:04	2–2
	2–3	36:10 – M. Pyörälä (E. Pirnes, J. Kemppainen) (PP)
M. Lahti (J. Ikonen, M. Poukkula) – 41:38	3–3
M. Mäenpää (É. Perrin, T. Pihlman) – 42:16	4–3
	4–4	52:21 – M. Nutivaara (E. Pirnes, S. Manninen)
T. Pihlman (É. Perrin, M. Mäenpää) – 65:33	5–4

12 min
Penalties
6 min
30
Shots
29

6 April 2015; 17:00	Kärpät	8–3 (4–0, 3–2, 1–1)	JYP	Oulun Energia Areena, Oulu; Attendance: 6,002

Game reference

Iiro Tarkki
Goalies
Tuomas Tarkki
Sami Rajaniemi
Referees:
Jukka Hakkarainen
Mikko Kaukokari
Linesmen:
Samuli Orava
Harri Perämäki

M. Pyörälä (J. Donskoi, A. Laatikainen) (PP) – 08:26	1–0
L. Kašpar (A. Laatikainen, E. Pirnes) – 08:43	2–0
E. Pirnes (M. Pyörälä, A. Laatikainen) (PP) – 13:55	3–0
M. Pyörälä (A. Laatikainen, J. Donskoi) (PP) – 14:49	4–0
S. Manninen – 21:41	5–0
B. Maxwell (J. Junttila, M. Nutivaara) (PP) – 24:14	6–0
	6–1	26:31 – J. Tuppurainen (M. Mäenpää, S. Rajaniemi) (PP)
B. Maxwell (M. Nutivaara, A. Masuhr) – 32:09	7–1
	7–2	37:45 – P. Hubáček (A. Löfman, M. Luoma) (PP)
S. Manninen (I. Huml) – 42:21	8–2
	8–3	47:23 – M. Poukkula (M. Lahti) (SH)

14 min
Penalties
20 min
27
Shots
28

8 April 2015; 18:30	JYP	2–1 1OT (1–0, 0–1, 0–0, 1–0)	Kärpät	Synergia-areena, Jyväskylä; Attendance: 4,013

Game reference

Tuomas Tarkki
Goalies
Iiro Tarkki
Referees:
Timo Favorin
Jari-Pekka Pajula
Linesmen:
Timo Heinonen
Pasi Nieminen

M. Nenonen (M. Poukkula, M. Mäenpää) – 17:52	1–0
	1–1	22:59– J. Kemppainen (J. Donskoi, A. Laatikainen)
J. Pulli (A. Löfman) – 73:23	2–1

6 min
Penalties
4 min
26
Shots
35

10 April 2015; 18:30	Kärpät	4–0 (0–0, 0–0, 4–0)	JYP	Oulun Energia Areena, Oulu; Attendance: 6,430

Game reference

Iiro Tarkki
Goalies
Tuomas Tarkki
Referees:
Jukka Hakkarainen
Anssi Salonen
Linesmen:
Iikka Kiilunen
Joonas Saha

J. Kemppainen (J. Junttila, J. Donskoi) – 40:30	1–0
A. Masuhr (S. Mäenalanen, S. Aho) – 52:29	2–0
B. Maxwell – 57:26	3–0
M. Pyörälä (B. Maxwell, I. Tarkki) (EN) – 58:48	4–0

6 min
Penalties
8 min
39
Shots
23

11 April 2015; 17:00	JYP	4–3 (2–1, 1–1, 1–1)	Kärpät	Synergia-areena, Jyväskylä; Attendance: 4,365

Game reference

Tuomas Tarkki
Sami Rajaniemi
Goalies
Iiro Tarkki
Tomi Karhunen
Referees:
Timo Favorin
Jari-Pekka Pajula
Linesmen:
Markus Hägerström
Sakari Suominen

	0–1	03:49 – R. Glenn (S. Manninen, S. Aho)
M. Mäenpää (É. Perrin, J. Tuppurainen) (PP) – 10:49	1–1
T. Pihlman (P. Hubáček) – 16:24	2–1
T. Pihlman (É. Perrin, M. Kalteva) – 20:47	3–1
	3–2	33:09 – M. Pyörälä (A. Laatikainen, J. Kemppainen) (PP)
M. Lahti (D. Boyce, M. Poukkula) – 50:13	4–2
	4–3	51:46 – E. Pirnes (R. Glenn)

8 min
Penalties
4 min
23
Shots
32

13 April 2015; 18:30	Kärpät	4–2 (1–1, 1–0, 2–1)	JYP	Oulun Energia Areena, Oulu; Attendance: 6,403

Game reference

Tomi Karhunen
Goalies
Tuomas Tarkki
Referees:
Timo Favorin
Jari-Pekka Pajula
Linesmen:
Markus Hägerström
Sakari Suominen

E. Pirnes (A. Laatikainen, M. Pyörälä) (PP) – 03:44	1–0
	1–1	16:28 – M. Luoma (M. Kalteva, P. Hubáček)
J. Keränen (J. Kemppainen) – 24:44	2–1
J. Donskoi (I. Huml, A. Masuhr) (PP) – 41:06	3–1
	3–2	48:18 – É. Perrin
E. Pirnes (EN) – 59:05	4–2

4 min
Penalties
10 min
28
Shots
27

Kärpät wins the series 4-3.

==== (2) Tappara vs. (3) Lukko ====
3 April 2015; 18:30	Tappara	5–2 (1–0, 1–1, 3–1)	Lukko	Tampere Ice Stadium, Tampere; Attendance: 6,945

Game reference

Juha Metsola
Goalies
Ryan Zapolski
Referees:
Stefan Fonselius
Jari Levonen
Linesmen:
Markus Hägerström
Sakari Suominen

A. Erkinjuntti (K. Kuusela, H. Tömmernes) (PP) – 09:06	1–0
K. Kuusela (O. Palola, A. Elorinne) (DP) – 35:33	2–0
	2–1	37:46 – M. Kousa
K. Kuusela (S. Dixon, O. Palola) – 50:52	3–1
	3–2	57:06 – J. Komulainen
A. Erkinjuntti (J. Peltola, J. Malinen) (EN) – 58:06	4–2
J. Peltola(H. Haapala, A. Bonsaksen) (EN) – 59:32	5–2

6 min
Penalties
26 min
24
Shots
28

4 April 2015; 16:00	Lukko	2–1 3OT (1–0, 0–1, 0–0, 0–0, 0–0, 1–0)	Tappara	Äijänsuo Arena, Rauma; Attendance: 5,000

Game reference

Ryan Zapolski
Goalies
Juha Metsola
Referees:
Mikko Kaukokari
Tom Laaksonen
Linesmen:
Lauri Nikulainen
Joonas Saha

J. Lahti (A. Gagnon, H. Tikkanen) – 11:53	1–0
	1–1	37:10 – P. Jormakka (H. Haapala, J. Green)
J. Lahti (A. Gagnon, I. Mikkola) – 109:05	2–1

6 min
Penalties
4 min
59
Shots
45

6 April 2015; 17:00	Tappara	1–2 (0–1, 1–1, 0–0)	Lukko	Tampere Ice Stadium, Tampere; Attendance: 6,259

Game reference

Juha Metsola
Goalies
Ryan Zapolski
Referees:
Antti Boman
Stefan Fonselius
Linesmen:
Henri Neva
Hannu Sormunen

	0–1	15:34 – J. Komulainen (J. Niskala, H. Tikkanen) (PP)
H. Tömmernes (J-M Järvinen, J. Peltola) – 26:16	1–1
	1–2	32:38 – O. Vauhkonen (J. Komulainen, M. Kousa)

4 min
Penalties
6 min
30
Shots
28

8 April 2015; 18:30	Lukko	5–4 1OT (3–2, 1–1, 0–1, 1–0)	Tappara	Äijänsuo Arena, Rauma; Attendance: 4,334

Game reference

Ryan Zapolski
Goalies
Juha Metsola
Mika Noronen
Referees:
Mikko Kaukokari
Tom Laaksonen
Linesmen:
Iikka Kiilunen
Joonas Saha

O. Vauhkonen (J. Komulainen, I. Mikkola) – 04:50	1–0
J. Niskala (V. Nieminen, H. Tikkanen) – 09:42	2–0
J. Virtanen (F. Riska) – 10:37	3–0
	3–1	12:40 – M. Marjamäki (H. Tömmernes, M. Kankaanperä)
	3–2	14:01 – H. Haapala (P. Jormakka, S. Dixon)
	3–3	28:06 – K. Kuusela (T. Aalto, J. Malinen)
A. Gagnon (J. Tommila, I. Mikkola) – 37:34	4–3
	4–4	50:25 – J. Karjalainen (M. Marjamäki)
T. Koivisto (J. Lahti, J. Tommila) – 74:09	5–4

6 min
Penalties
4 min
26
Shots
30

10 April 2015; 18:30	Tappara	2–0 (1–0, 1–0, 0–0)	Lukko	Tampere Ice Stadium, Tampere; Attendance: 5,740

Game reference
Juha Metsola	Goalies	Ryan Zapolski	Referees: Antti Boman; Jari Levonen; Linesmen: Jani Pesonen; Masi Puolakka
J. Peltola (P. Jormakka, T. Aalto) – 05:50 / 1–0; J. Green (PP) – 26:00 / 2–0			Referees: Antti Boman; Jari Levonen; Linesmen: Jani Pesonen; Masi Puolakka
10 min	Penalties	6 min	Referees: Antti Boman; Jari Levonen; Linesmen: Jani Pesonen; Masi Puolakka
15	Shots	22	Referees: Antti Boman; Jari Levonen; Linesmen: Jani Pesonen; Masi Puolakka

11 April 2015; 17:00	Lukko	3–4 (1–3, 0–0, 2–1)	Tappara	Äijänsuo Arena, Rauma; Attendance: 4,500

Game reference

Ryan Zapolski
Goalies
Juha Metsola
Referees:
Mikko Kaukokari
Tom Laaksonen
Linesmen:
Henri Neva
Hannu Sormunen

	0–1	00:28 – H. Tömmernes (M. Kankaanperä, A. Erkinjuntti)
M. Kousa (A. Gagnon, J. Lahti) (PP) – 09:07	1–1
	1–2	10:57 – O. Palola (K. Kuusela, J. Malinen)
	1–3	12:55 – T. Aalto (A. Erkinjuntti, O. Palola) (PP)
	1–4	49:45 – A. Bonsaksen (J-M Järvinen, P. Jormakka)
H. Forsberg (T. Koivisto, I. Mikkola) – 58:24	2–4
T. Koivisto (M. Kousa, T. Nurmi) – 59:22	3–4

6 min
Penalties
4 min
42
Shots
22

13 April 2015; 18:30	Tappara	4–2 (2–0, 1–0, 1–2)	Lukko	Tampere Ice Stadium, Tampere; Attendance: 6,929

Game reference

Juha Metsola
Goalies
Ryan Zapolski
Referees:
Mikko Kaukokari
Tom Laaksonen
Linesmen:
Iikka Kiilunen
Joonas Saha

J. Peltola (P. Jormakka, J-M Järvinen) (DP) – 10:50	1–0
P. Jormakka (A. Elorinne, J. Peltola) – 14:23	2–0
J. Green – 35:56	3–0
	3–1	42:17 – A. Gagnon (J. Niskala) (PP)
O. Palola (J. Malinen, M. Kankaanperä) – 50:16	4–1
	4–2	52:32 – O. Vauhkonen (T. Nurmi, M. Kousa)

2 min
Penalties
2 min
24
Shots
28

Tappara wins the series 4–3.

=== Bronze medal game ===
17 April 2015; 18:30	Lukko	1–2 (0–0, 1–1, 0–1)	JYP	Äijänsuo Arena, Rauma; Attendance: 4,023

Game reference

Ryan Zapolski
Goalies
Tuomas Tarkki
Referees:
Mikko Kaukokari
Tom Laaksonen
Linesmen:
Lauri Nikulainen
Jani Pesonen

T. Koivisto (A. Gagnon, J. Piitulainen) – 27:14	1–0
	1–1	35:54 – T. Pihlman (É. Perrin, J. Tuppurainen)
	1–2	55:08 – M. Luoma (M. Hännikäinen) (SH)

6 min
Penalties
8 min
24
Shots
32

=== Finals (best-of-seven) ===
15 April 2015; 18:30	Kärpät	2–3 1OT (1–1, 1–1, 0–0, 0–1)	Tappara	Oulun Energia Areena, Oulu; Attendance: 5,353

Game reference

Tomi Karhunen
Goalies
Juha Metsola
Referees:
Jukka Hakkarainen
Jari Levonen
Linesmen:
Markus Hägerström
Sakari Suominen

J. Kemppainen (M. Niemelä, J. Junttila) – 03:28	1–0
	1–1	15:39 – J. Green (T. Aalto, K. Kuusela) (PP)
	1–2	22:10 – P. Jormakka (J-M Järvinen)
M. Pyörälä (J. Donskoi, A. Laatikainen) (PP) – 30:24	2–2
	2–3	61:13 – T. Aalto (S. Dixon, H. Haapala)

4 min
Penalties
10 min
27
Shots
20

17 April 2015; 18:30	Tappara	2–3 1OT (1–0, 1–0, 1–1, 0–1)	Kärpät	Tampere Ice Stadium, Tampere; Attendance: 7,163

Game reference

Juha Metsola
Goalies
Tomi Karhunen
Referees:
Antti Boman
Stefan Fonselius
Linesmen:
Iikka Kiilunen
Joonas Saha

J. Green (H. Tömmernes) – 02:42	1–0
K. Kuusela (A. Erkinjuntti, T. Aalto) – 34:02	2–0
	2–1	40:45 – J. Donskoi (J. Junttila, J. Kemppainen)
	2–2	47:05 – I. Huml (B. Maxwell, M. Pyörälä)
	2–3	69:58 – I. Huml (A. Masuhr, B. Maxwell)

4 min
Penalties
10 min
22
Shots
27

18 April 2015; 16:00	Kärpät	3–2 (2–2, 0–0, 1–0)	Tappara	Oulun Energia Areena, Oulu; Attendance: 6,614

Game reference

Tomi Karhunen
Goalies
Juha Metsola
Referees:
Jukka Hakkarainen
Jari Levonen
Linesmen:
Iikka Kiilunen
Joonas Saha

J. Kemppainen (R. Glenn, J. Donskoi) – 06:39	1–0
J. Donskoi (E. Pirnes, A. Laatikainen) (PP) – 13:33	2–0
	2–1	16:28 – O. Palola (J. Malinen, K. Kuusela)
	2–2	17:32 – O. Palola (J. Green, K. Kuusela) (PP)
J. Junttila (J. Kemppainen, A. Laatikainen)	3–2

4 min
Penalties
6 min
25
Shots
15

20 April 2015; 18:30	Tappara	2–3 1OT (0–1, 2–1, 0–0, 0–1)	Kärpät	Tampere Ice Stadium, Tampere; Attendance: 7,300

Game reference

Juha Metsola
Goalies
Tomi Karhunen
Referees:
Antti Boman
Stefan Fonselius
Linesmen:
Markus Hägerström
Sakari Suominen

	0–1	07:02 – J. Junttila (M. Nutivaara, J. Donskoi)
P. Jormakka (J-M Järvinen) – 21:47	1–1
J. Green (K. Kuusela, O. Palola) (PP) – 23:08	2–1
	2–2	36:18 – E. Pirnes (B. Maxwell, M. Nutivaara)
	2–3	74:35 – J. Junttila (L. Kukkonen)

8 min
Penalties
6 min
40
Shots
39

22 April 2015; 18:30	Kärpät	3–4 (0–0, 0–2, 3–2)	Tappara	Oulun Energia Areena, Oulu; Attendance: 6,614

Game reference

Tomi Karhunen
Iiro Tarkki
Goalies
Juha Metsola
Referees:
Jukka Hakkarainen
Jari Levonen
Linesmen:
Iikka Kiilunen
Joonas Saha

	0–1	30:40 – K. Kuusela (A. Bonsaksen, O. Palola)
	0–2	34:27 – O. Palola (J. Green, T. Aalto)
A. Masuhr (J. Kemppainen) – 40:20	1–2
	1–3	43:15 – P. Jormakka (H. Haapala)
J. Junttila (E. Pirnes, J. Kemppainen) (DP) – 44:48	2–3
	2–4	45:46 – S. Dixon (P. Jormakka, H. Haapala)
L. Kukkonen (J. Junttila, A. Laatikainen) – 53:27	3–4

2 min
Penalties
6 min
39
Shots
18

24 April 2015; 18:30	Tappara	2–1 1OT (0–0, 1–0, 0–1, 1–0)	Kärpät	Tampere Ice Stadium, Tampere; Attendance: 7,300

Game reference

Juha Metsola
Goalies
Iiro Tarkki
Referees:
Antti Boman
Stefan Fonselius
Linesmen:
Markus Hägerström
Sakari Suominen

H. Haapala (P. Jormakka) – 29:38	1–0
	1–1	48:09 – B. Maxwell (L. Kukkonen, A. Laatikainen)
M. Marjamäki (J. Peltola, J. Malinen) – 65:39	2–1

4 min
Penalties
4 min
28
Shots
31

25 April 2015; 17:00	Kärpät	2–1 2OT (1–0, 0–0, 0–1, 0–0, 1–0)	Tappara	Oulun Energia Areena, Oulu; Attendance: 6,614

Game reference

Iiro Tarkki
Goalies
Juha Metsola
Referees:
Jukka Hakkarainen
Jari Levonen
Linesmen:
Iikka Kiilunen
Joonas Saha

J. Donskoi (J. Kemppainen, A. Laatikainen) – 14:34	1–0
	1–1	42:22 – O. Palola (A. Erkinjuntti, K. Kuusela) (PP)
S. Aho (I. Huml, M. Nutivaara) – 81:00	2–1

2 min
Penalties
16 min
32
Shots
26

Kärpät wins the finals 4–3.

== Final rankings ==
Gold medal	Kärpät
Silver medal	Tappara
Bronze medal	JYP
4	Lukko
5	Blues
6	KalPa
7	HIFK
8	SaiPa
9	Ässät
10	Ilves
11	HPK
12	Pelicans
13	TPS
14	Sport
