= Komulainen =

Komulainen is a Finnish surname. Notable people with the surname include:

- Jari Komulainen, Finnish businessman
- Joonas Komulainen (born 1990), Finnish ice hockey player
- Juhani Komulainen (born 1953), Finnish composer
- Mikko Komulainen (born 1994), Finnish ice hockey player
