= Grillfors =

Grillfors is a surname. Notable people with the surname include:

- Daniel Grillfors (born 1982), Swedish ice hockey player
- Tilde Grillfors (born 2008), Swedish ice hockey player
