= Vauhkonen =

Vauhkonen is a Finnish surname. Notable people with the surname include:

- Olavi Vauhkonen (born 1989), Finnish ice hockey player
- Vilho Vauhkonen (1877–1957), Finnish sport shooter
