= Tarkki =

Tarkki is a Finnish surname. Notable people with the surname include:

- Iiro Tarkki (born 1985), Finnish ice hockey goaltender
- Saija Tarkki (born 1982), Finnish ice hockey player
- Tuomas Tarkki (born 1980), Finnish ice hockey goaltender
