= Luttinen =

Luttinen is a surname. Notable people with the surname include:

- Arttu Luttinen (born 1983), Finnish professional ice hockey forward
- Mika Luttinen, Finnish-born vocalist and lyricist
