= Suoranta =

Suoranta is a Finnish surname. Notable people with the surname include:

- Elli Suoranta (born 2002), Finnish ice hockey player
- Juha Suoranta (born 1966), Finnish social scientist
- Simon Suoranta (born 1992), Finnish ice hockey player
