= Veeti Vuorio =

Finnish ice hockey player

- Born: 20 May 1996 (age 28); Turku, Finland
- Height: 6 ft 2 in (188 cm)
- Weight: 194 lb (88 kg; 13 st 12 lb)
- Position: Forward
- Shoots: Left
- Liiga team: HC TPS
- NHL draft: Undrafted
- Playing career: 2013–present

Veeti Vuorio (born 20 May 1996) is a Finnish ice hockey player. He is currently playing with HC TPS in the Finnish Liiga.

On 12 March 2015, Vuorio made his Liiga debut playing with HC TPS during the 2014–15 season.
