= Simon Backman =

Finnish former ice hockey defenceman

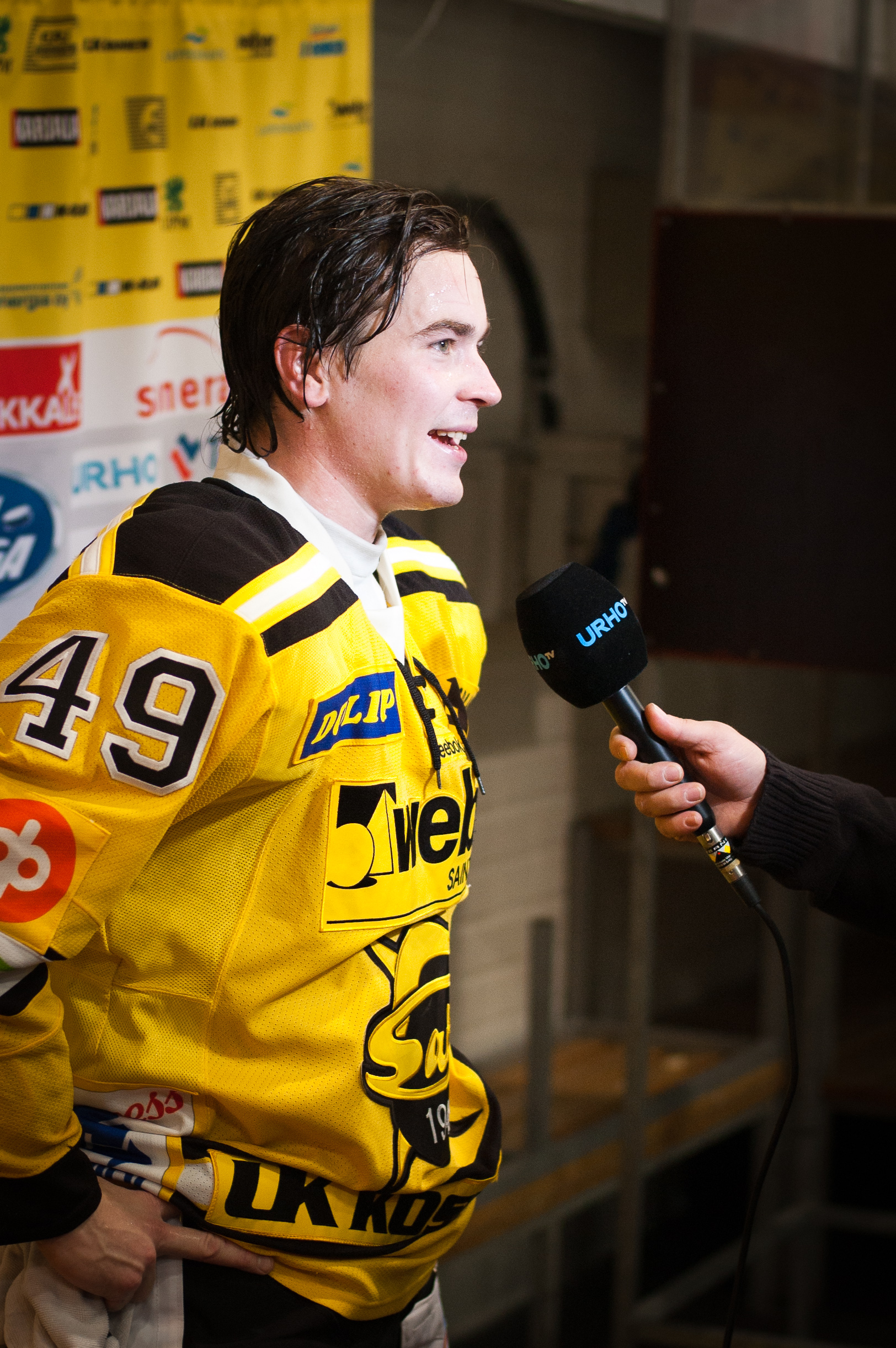
- Born: June 12, 1984 (age 40); Jakobstad, Finland
- Height: 5 ft 9 in (175 cm)
- Weight: 185 lb (84 kg; 13 st 3 lb)
- Position: Defence
- Shoots: Left
- SM-liiga team: SaiPa
- Played for: TPS; SaiPa
- NHL draft: Undrafted
- Playing career: 2003–present

Simon Backman (born June 12, 1984) is a Finnish former ice hockey defenceman.

Backman played in Liiga for TPS and SaiPa. He also played in the Metal Ligaen in Denmark for EfB Ishockey and in the HockeyAllsvenskan in Sweden for IF Björklöven.

== Career statistics ==
			Regular season					Playoffs
Season	Team	League	GP	G	A	Pts	PIM	GP	G	A	Pts	PIM
2001–02	HC TPS U18	U18 SM-sarja	19	3	3	6	16	—	—	—	—	—
2001–02	HC TPS U20	U20 SM-liiga	13	0	4	4	2	9	0	0	0	8
2002–03	HC TPS U20	U20 SM-liiga	36	8	8	16	38	3	0	0	0	0
2003–04	HC TPS U20	U20 SM-liiga	10	0	1	1	18	1	0	0	0	2
2003–04	HC TPS	SM-liiga	35	0	0	0	4	5	0	0	0	0
2003–04	Suomi U20	Mestis	4	0	0	0	2	—	—	—	—	—
2004–05	HC TPS U20	U20 SM-liiga	16	3	6	9	12	11	1	3	4	6
2004–05	HC TPS	SM-liiga	25	0	0	0	10	—	—	—	—	—
2005–06	HC TPS	SM-liiga	55	2	4	6	24	2	0	0	0	2
2006–07	HC TPS	SM-liiga	56	2	7	9	50	2	0	0	0	0
2007–08	HC TPS	SM-liiga	51	0	1	1	6	1	0	0	0	0
2008–09	EfB Ishockey	Denmark	6	0	0	0	6	—	—	—	—	—
2008–09	SaiPa	SM-liiga	46	3	6	9	24	—	—	—	—	—
2009–10	SaiPa	SM-liiga	58	6	9	15	54	—	—	—	—	—
2010–11	SaiPa	SM-liiga	15	1	2	3	14	—	—	—	—	—
2011–12	SaiPa	SM-liiga	53	4	11	15	42	—	—	—	—	—
2012–13	SaiPa	SM-liiga	59	4	9	13	30	3	0	0	0	0
2013–14	SaiPa	Liiga	37	3	8	11	22	9	1	1	2	2
2014–15	SaiPa	Liiga	57	2	5	7	18	7	1	1	2	4
2015–16	SaiPa	Liiga	59	1	8	9	22	3	0	0	0	0
2016–17	SaiPa	Liiga	60	0	5	5	22	—	—	—	—	—
2017–18	IF Björklöven	HockeyAllsvenskan	50	3	6	9	24	5	0	0	0	2
2018–19	IF Björklöven	HockeyAllsvenskan	20	0	1	1	4	—	—	—	—	—
SM-liiga totals			666	28	75	103	342	32	2	2	4	8
