= Patrick Davis (ice hockey) =

American ice hockey player (born 1986)

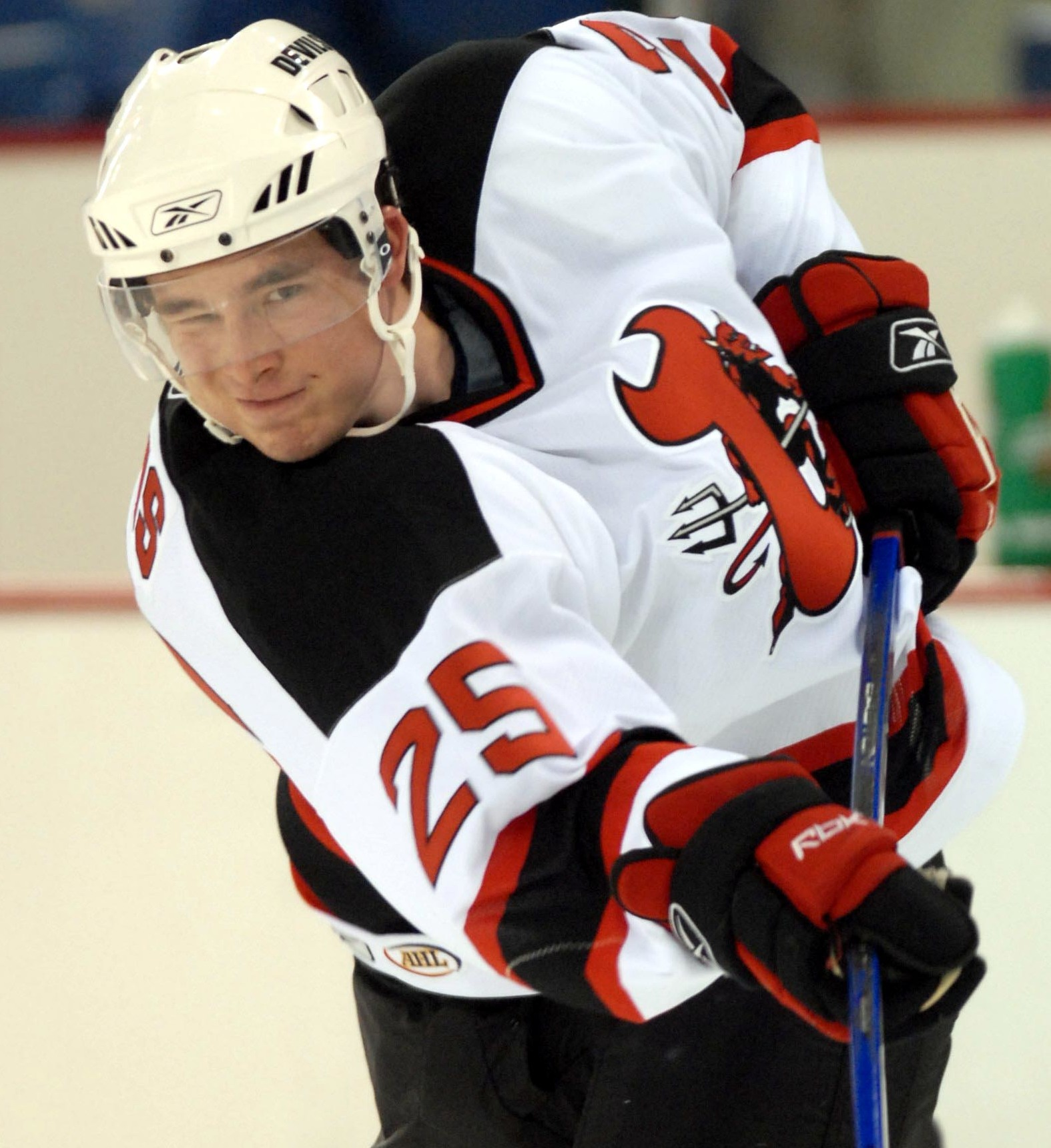
- Davis with the Lowell Devils in 2008
- Born: December 28, 1986 (age 39) Warsaw, Indiana, U.S.
- Height: 6 ft 2 in (188 cm)
- Weight: 205 lb (93 kg; 14 st 9 lb)
- Position: Right wing
- Shot: Right
- Played for: New Jersey Devils; EHC Wolfsburg; CSKA Moscow; SaiPa; Oulun Kärpät; KalPa
- NHL draft: 99th overall, 2005; New Jersey Devils
- Playing career: 2006–2016

Patrick Davis (born December 28, 1986) is an American former professional ice hockey player. He last played right wing for KalPa of the SM-liiga (SM-l).

== Early life ==
Davis was born in Warsaw, Indiana, and raised in Metro Detroit, where he played youth hockey.

== Career ==
Davis was drafted 99th overall in the 2005 NHL entry draft by the New Jersey Devils.

During the 2008–09 season, Davis made his NHL debut with the New Jersey Devils. On January 23, 2010, he scored his first career NHL goal in a game against the Toronto Maple Leafs. During the 2010–11 season, he was traded to the San Jose Sharks along with Mike Swift in exchange for Steven Zalewski and Jay Leach.

During the 2011–12 season he played for EHC Wolfsburg Grizzly Adams a professional ice hockey club of the German professional Deutsche Eishockey Liga. In August 2012, he left Wolfsburg to sign as a free agent with CSKA Moscow of the Russian Kontinental Hockey League playing under General Manager Sergei Fedorov whose father, Viktor, was Patrick's coach in minor hockey.

For a third consecutive season, Davis moved within Europe, to sign a one-year contract with Finnish club, SaiPa of the SM-liiga on July 5, 2013.

== Career statistics ==
			Regular season					Playoffs
Season	Team	League	GP	G	A	Pts	PIM	GP	G	A	Pts	PIM
2002–03	Sioux City Musketeers	USHL	16	3	2	5	8	1	0	0	0	2
2003–04	Kitchener Rangers	OHL	27	8	10	18	21	—	—	—	—	—
2004–05	Kitchener Rangers	OHL	59	20	30	50	41	14	3	4	7	20
2005–06	Kitchener Rangers	OHL	22	13	4	17	30	—	—	—	—	—
2005–06	Windsor Spitfires	OHL	38	22	29	51	64	7	2	6	8	12
2005–06	Albany River Rats	AHL	3	0	0	0	2	—	—	—	—	—
2006–07	Lowell Devils	AHL	41	5	13	18	26	—	—	—	—	—
2007–08	Lowell Devils	AHL	60	7	12	19	58	—	—	—	—	—
2008–09	Lowell Devils	AHL	74	13	17	30	45	—	—	—	—	—
2008–09	New Jersey Devils	NHL	1	0	0	0	0	—	—	—	—	—
2009–10	Lowell Devils	AHL	73	15	20	35	39	5	2	0	2	2
2009–10	New Jersey Devils	NHL	8	1	0	1	0	—	—	—	—	—
2010–11	Albany Devils	AHL	40	3	10	13	22	—	—	—	—	—
2010–11	Worcester Sharks	AHL	26	4	4	8	2	—	—	—	—	—
2011–12	Grizzly Adams Wolfsburg	DEL	44	9	7	16	30	4	0	2	2	14
2012–13	CSKA Moscow	KHL	41	3	8	11	26	9	1	0	1	39
2013–14	SaiPa	Liiga	51	22	13	35	50	8	1	5	6	12
2014–15	Kärpät	Liiga	50	9	6	15	38	10	2	1	3	0
2015–16	KalPa	Liiga	59	11	10	21	78	3	0	0	0	0
AHL totals			317	47	76	123	194	5	2	0	2	2
NHL totals			9	1	0	1	0	—	—	—	—	—
Liiga totals			160	42	29	71	166	21	3	6	9	12
