= Markku Flinck =

Finnish professional ice hockey player

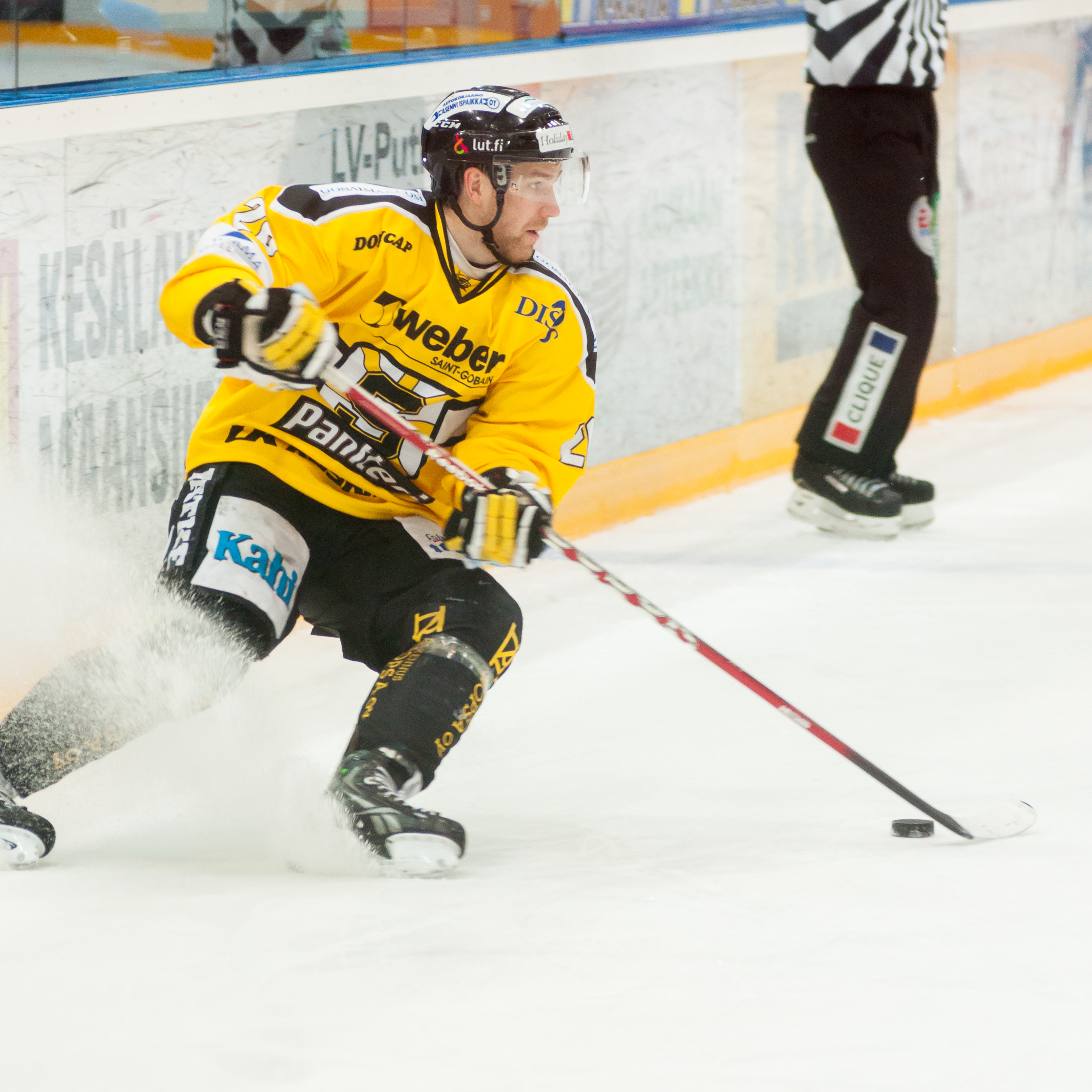
- Born: January 4, 1985 (age 40); Espoo, Finland
- Height: 186 cm (6 ft 1 in)
- Weight: 92 kg (203 lb; 14 st 7 lb)
- Position: Centre
- Shot: Left
- Played for: Espoo Blues; HC Salamat; Jokipojat; KooKoo; Mikkelin Jukurit; SaiPa; Ilves; Pyry
- NHL draft: Undrafted
- Playing career: 2004–2020

Markku Flinck (born January 4, 1985) is a Finnish professional ice hockey player. He is currently playing for Jukurit of the Finnish Liiga.

He made his Liiga debut playing with Espoo Blues during the 2004–05 SM-liiga season.

== Career statistics ==
			Regular season					Playoffs
Season	Team	League	GP	G	A	Pts	PIM	GP	G	A	Pts	PIM
2000–01	Espoo Blues U16	U16 SM-sarja	14	18	8	26	22	2	1	0	1	16
2000–01	Espoo Blues U18	U18 SM-sarja	3	0	0	0	2	—	—	—	—	—
2000–01	Espoo Blues U20	U20 SM-liiga	2	0	0	0	0	—	—	—	—	—
2001–02	Espoo Blues U18	U18 SM-sarja	26	8	11	19	30	—	—	—	—	—
2002–03	Espoo Blues U18	U18 SM-sarja	26	9	12	21	38	8	2	2	4	10
2002–03	Espoo Blues U20	U20 SM-liiga	3	0	0	0	0	—	—	—	—	—
2003–04	Espoo Blues U20	U20 SM-liiga	41	11	9	20	22	5	2	1	3	12
2004–05	Espoo Blues U20	U20 SM-liiga	38	15	16	31	58	6	1	1	2	2
2004–05	Espoo Blues	SM-liiga	8	1	0	1	2	—	—	—	—	—
2005–06	HC Salamat	Mestis	9	0	0	0	2	—	—	—	—	—
2005–06	Espoo Blues U20	U20 SM-liiga	15	2	11	13	30	10	1	5	6	14
2006–07	HC Salamat	Mestis	42	3	14	17	54	—	—	—	—	—
2007–08	Jokipojat	Mestis	38	12	12	24	63	3	1	1	2	4
2008–09	KooKoo	Mestis	44	15	22	37	42	5	2	2	4	4
2008–09	Espoo Blues	SM-liiga	2	0	0	0	2	—	—	—	—	—
2009–10	Jokipojat	Mestis	44	11	20	31	36	9	1	1	2	8
2010–11	Mikkelin Jukurit	Mestis	49	16	31	47	40	11	5	11	16	12
2010–11	SaiPa	SM-liiga	3	1	2	3	0	—	—	—	—	—
2011–12	SaiPa	SM-liiga	57	5	8	13	63	—	—	—	—	—
2011–12	Mikkelin Jukurit	Mestis	1	2	1	3	0	—	—	—	—	—
2012–13	SaiPa	SM-liiga	59	7	14	21	26	—	—	—	—	—
2013–14	SaiPa	Liiga	57	5	12	17	63	11	0	0	0	37
2014–15	SaiPa	Liiga	52	0	8	8	36	6	1	1	2	33
2015–16	Ilves	Liiga	48	12	15	27	61	—	—	—	—	—
2016–17	Ilves	Liiga	57	8	7	15	35	10	2	2	4	2
2017–18	Mikkelin Jukurit	Liiga	53	2	9	11	36	—	—	—	—	—
2018–19	Mikkelin Jukurit	Liiga	56	10	14	24	12	—	—	—	—	—
2019–20	Pyry	Suomi-sarja	35	19	32	51	18	4	3	1	4	0
SM-liiga totals			452	51	89	140	336	27	3	3	6	72
Mestis totals			227	59	100	159	237	28	9	15	24	28
