= Janne Lahti =

Finnish ice hockey player

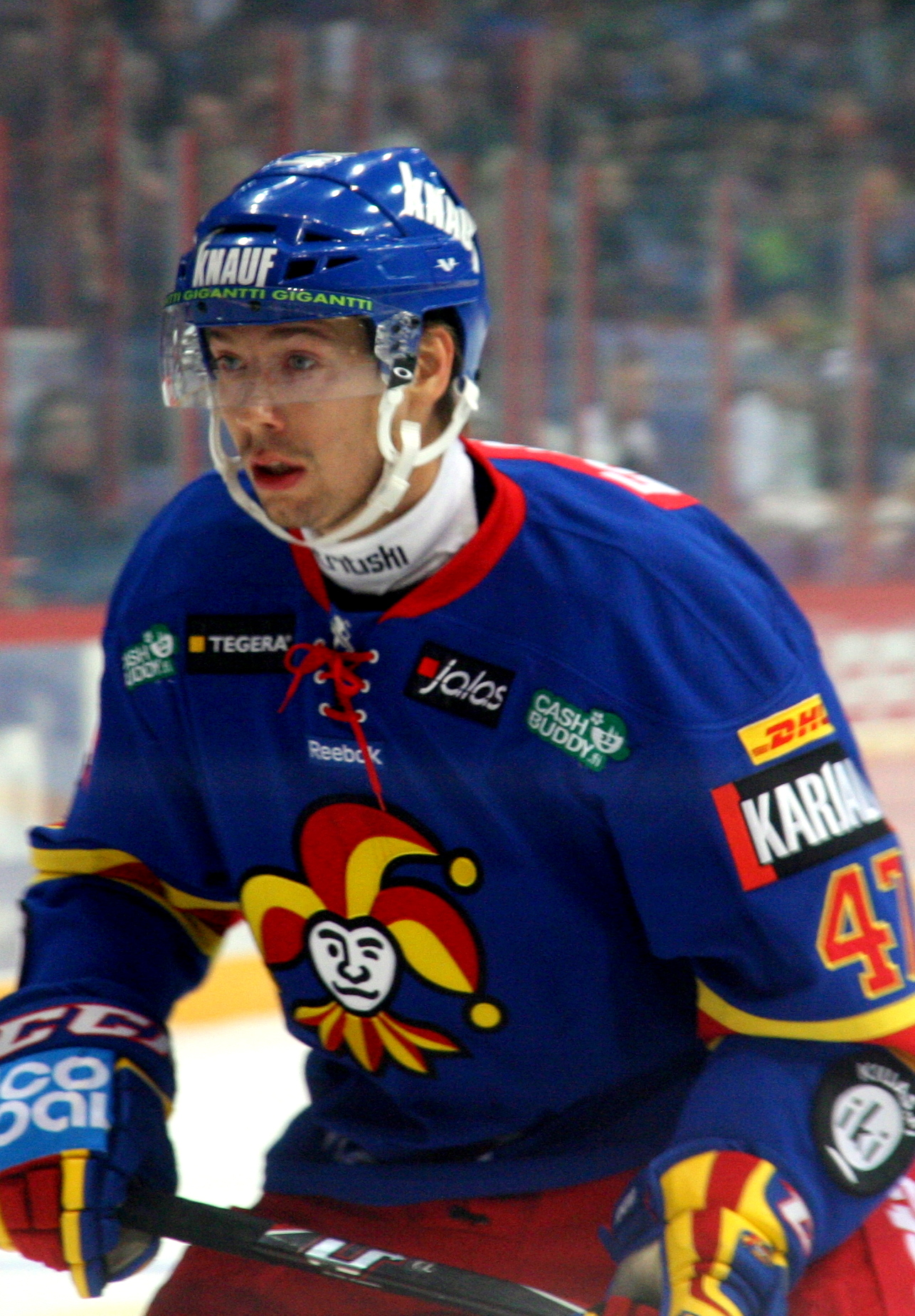
- Born: 20 July 1982 (age 44) Riihimäki, Finland
- Height: 6 ft 2 in (188 cm)
- Weight: 216 lb (98 kg; 15 st 6 lb)
- Position: Left wing
- Shot: Left
- Played for: HPK; Lukko; Jokerit; Ak Bars Kazan; Amur Khabarovsk
- National team: Finland
- NHL draft: Undrafted
- Playing career: 2001–2019
Medal record
World Championships
Gold medal – first place	2011 Slovakia

Janne Lahti (born 20 July 1982) is a Finnish former professional ice hockey forward. He most recently played with HPK of the Finnish Liiga during the 2018–19 season.

On 1 June 2007, Lahti signed a one-year contract with the Montreal Canadiens, and he played the 2007–08 season in the American Hockey League with the Hamilton Bulldogs.

== Career statistics ==
			Regular season					Playoffs
Season	Team	League	GP	G	A	Pts	PIM	GP	G	A	Pts	PIM
1998–99	HPK U18	U18 SM-sarja	36	10	6	16	18	—	—	—	—	—
1999–00	HPK U18	U18 SM-sarja	12	5	7	12	2	—	—	—	—	—
1999–00	HPK U20	U20 SM-liiga	6	0	1	1	0	—	—	—	—	—
2000–01	HPK U20	U20 SM-liiga	35	9	11	20	16	—	—	—	—	—
2001–02	HPK U20	U20 SM-liiga	22	22	11	33	18	4	1	3	4	2
2001–02	HPK	SM-liiga	36	1	0	1	2	4	0	0	0	0
2002–03	HPK U20	U20 SM-liiga	11	4	8	12	31	—	—	—	—	—
2002–03	HPK	SM-liiga	12	1	0	1	2	1	0	0	0	0
2003–04	HPK	SM-liiga	43	14	6	20	26	8	1	0	1	0
2004–05	HPK	SM-liiga	52	6	9	15	22	8	2	2	4	4
2004–05	Haukat	Mestis	4	2	2	4	2	—	—	—	—	—
2005–06	HPK	SM-liiga	51	9	13	22	30	13	5	4	9	6
2006–07	HPK	SM-liiga	56	20	14	34	87	9	8	1	9	4
2007–08	Hamilton Bulldogs	AHL	65	9	9	18	47	—	—	—	—	—
2008–09	Jokerit	SM-liiga	41	9	8	17	10	5	1	3	4	2
2009–10	Jokerit	SM-liiga	46	15	10	25	28	3	0	1	1	0
2010–11	Jokerit	SM-liiga	59	37	22	59	30	7	5	2	7	2
2011–12	Jokerit	SM-liiga	43	18	12	30	32	10	4	1	5	4
2012–13	Ak Bars Kazan	KHL	12	1	2	3	4	—	—	—	—	—
2012–13	Amur Khabarovsk	KHL	19	2	5	7	10	—	—	—	—	—
2013–14	Jokerit	Liiga	49	13	10	23	12	2	0	0	0	0
2015–16	Lukko	Liiga	43	8	11	19	14	14	5	4	9	4
2015–16	Lukko	Liiga	39	8	9	17	6	2	0	1	1	0
2016–17	HPK	Liiga	49	11	16	27	12	7	1	3	4	2
2017–18	HPK	Liiga	51	6	9	15	18	—	—	—	—	—
2018–19	HPK	Liiga	19	3	0	3	14	—	—	—	—	—
AHL totals			65	9	9	18	47	—	—	—	—	—
SM-liiga totals			689	179	149	328	345	93	32	22	54	28
