= Adam Masuhr =

Swedish ice hockey player

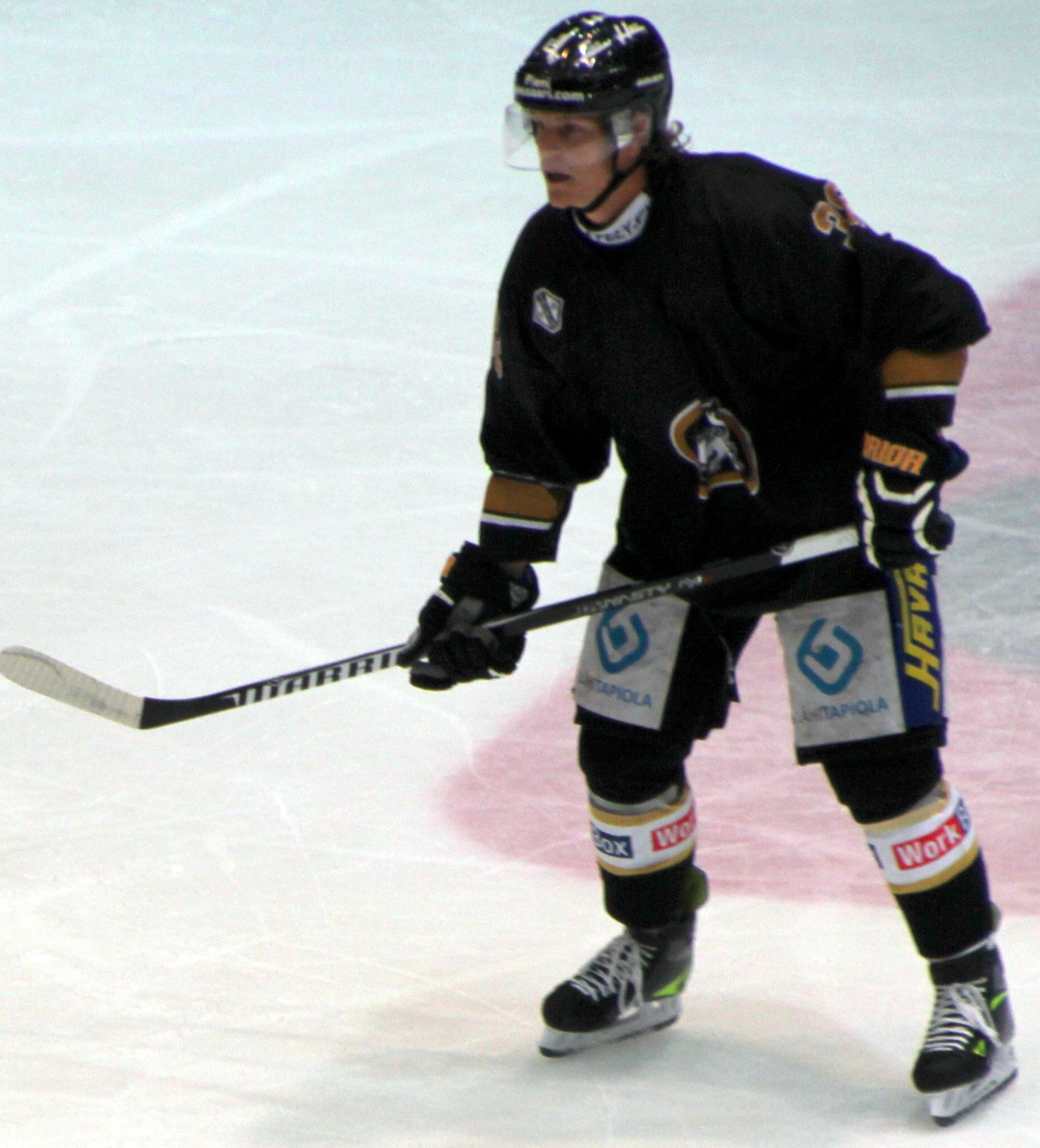
- Born: May 21, 1983 (age 43) Gävle, Sweden
- Height: 6 ft 0 in (183 cm)
- Weight: 191 lb (87 kg; 13 st 9 lb)
- Position: Defence
- Shot: Right
- Played for: Brynäs IF; Mora IK; Djurgårdens IF; Modo Hockey; KalPa; Kärpät; Severstal Cherepovets
- Playing career: 2001–2021

Adam Masuhr, born Andersson (born May 21, 1983) is a Swedish former professional ice hockey defenceman, he last played as Captain for Mora IK of the HockeyAllsvenskan (Allsv).

== Playing career ==
After playing for his hometown team Gävle GIK as a youngster, he joined Mora IK's youth ranks and made his debut on the club's men's squad in the second-tier league HockeyAllsvenskan during the 2000-01 season. Masuhr signed with Brynäs IF of the Swedish Hockey League (SHL) for the 2001-02 campaign. During the 2003-04 season, he joined back Mora IK and helped them move up to the SHL. After playing for Mora in the 2004-05 SHL campaign, he moved on to fellow SHL side Djurgårdens IF and joined Modo Hockey in 2006. During the 2007-08 season, he again returned to Mora.

Masuhr signed his first contract outside of Sweden prior to the 2009-10 season, when joining KalPa of the Finnish top-flight Liiga. He spent five years with the club and then headed to another Liiga outfit, Oulun Kärpät. Following the 2015-16 season, he left Kärpät and signed with Severstal Cherepovets of the Kontinental Hockey League (KHL).

== Career statistics ==
			Regular season					Playoffs
Season	Team	League	GP	G	A	Pts	PIM	GP	G	A	Pts	PIM
1999–00	Mora IK J18	J18 Allsvenskan	1	0	0	0	4	1	0	1	1	0
1999–00	Mora IK J20	J20 SuperElit	34	2	4	6	16	1	0	0	0	0
2000–01	Mora IK J18	J18 Allsvenskan	7	1	0	1	8	7	0	1	1	4
2000–01	Mora IK J20	J20 SuperElit	10	1	1	2	6	5	1	3	4	2
2000–01	Mora IK	Allsvenskan	16	0	2	2	4	—	—	—	—	—
2001–02	Brynäs IF J20	J20 SuperElit	6	1	0	1	4	3	1	1	2	4
2001–02	Brynäs IF	Elitserien	39	1	5	6	14	1	0	0	0	0
2001–02	Tierps HK	Allsvenskan	5	1	0	1	8	—	—	—	—	—
2002–03	Brynäs IF	Elitserien	45	0	5	5	28	—	—	—	—	—
2003–04	Brynäs IF	Elitserien	26	1	1	2	4	—	—	—	—	—
2003–04	Mora IK	Allsvenskan	22	2	5	7	24	10	2	1	3	4
2004–05	Mora IK	Elitserien	50	6	12	18	22	—	—	—	—	—
2005–06	Djurgårdens IF	Elitserien	46	8	12	20	46	—	—	—	—	—
2006–07	MODO Hockey	Elitserien	54	6	11	17	40	20	2	4	6	4
2007–08	MODO Hockey	Elitserien	2	0	0	0	0	—	—	—	—	—
2007–08	Mora IK	Elitserien	49	6	8	14	16	—	—	—	—	—
2008–09	Mora IK	HockeyAllsvenskan	44	11	14	25	32	3	0	1	1	0
2009–10	KalPa	SM-liiga	42	16	15	31	34	13	1	4	5	6
2010–11	KalPa	SM-liiga	55	6	15	21	53	6	0	0	0	2
2011–12	KalPa	SM-liiga	54	9	9	18	14	1	0	1	1	0
2012–13	KalPa	SM-liiga	57	12	15	27	45	5	1	1	2	12
2013–14	KalPa	Liiga	43	4	6	10	22	—	—	—	—	—
2013–14	Oulun Kärpät	Liiga	12	2	2	4	2	16	1	4	5	12
2014–15	Oulun Kärpät	Liiga	56	6	15	21	20	19	4	4	8	8
2015–16	Oulun Kärpät	Liiga	58	8	14	22	12	14	2	1	3	4
2016–17	Severstal Cherepovets	KHL	60	4	15	19	13	—	—	—	—	—
2017–18	Severstal Cherepovets	KHL	56	5	11	16	18	4	0	2	2	2
2018–19	Mora IK	SHL	52	5	11	16	26	—	—	—	—	—
2019–20	Mora IK	HockeyAllsvenskan	52	5	11	16	36	—	—	—	—	—
2020–21	Mora IK	HockeyAllsvenskan	27	1	9	10	10	—	—	—	—	—
KHL totals			116	9	26	35	31	4	0	2	2	2
SHL (Elitserien) totals			363	33	65	98	196	21	2	4	6	4
Liiga (SM-liiga) totals			377	63	91	154	202	74	9	15	24	44
