= Otto Honkaheimo =

Finnish ice hockey player

- Born: August 3, 1985 (age 39); Rauma, Finland
- Height: 6 ft 1 in (185 cm)
- Weight: 203 lb (92 kg; 14 st 7 lb)
- Position: Defense
- Shot: Left
- Played for: Lukko; FPS; KalPa; LeKi; Hokki; HIFK; Kiekko-Vantaa; HPK; Stjernen Hockey; Peliitat; Sport
- NHL draft: Undrafted
- Playing career: 2003–2017

Otto Honkaheimo (born August 3, 1985) is a Finnish ice hockey defenceman who currently plays professionally in Finland for Lukko of the SM-liiga. He currently is the captain for Lukko, succeeding Erik Hämäläinen.

== Career statistics ==
			Regular season					Playoffs
Season	Team	League	GP	G	A	Pts	PIM	GP	G	A	Pts	PIM
2000–01	Lukko U16	Jr. C SM-sarja	14	3	2	5	30	2	0	0	0	6
2000–01	Lukko U18	Jr. B SM-sarja	1	0	0	0	2	—	—	—	—	—
2001–02	Lukko U18	Jr. B SM-sarja	17	2	6	8	47	—	—	—	—	—
2001–02	Lukko U20	Jr. A SM-liiga	9	0	0	0	4	—	—	—	—	—
2002–03	Lukko U18	Jr. B SM-sarja	9	1	11	12	35	—	—	—	—	—
2002–03	Lukko U20	Jr. A SM-liiga	30	3	6	9	82	—	—	—	—	—
2003–04	Lukko U20	Jr. A SM-liiga	33	5	20	25	75	—	—	—	—	—
2003–04	Lukko	Liiga	6	0	0	0	2	1	0	0	0	0
2003–04	Suomi U20	Mestis	5	0	0	0	2	—	—	—	—	—
2004–05	Lukko U20	Jr. A SM-liiga	14	1	3	4	8	—	—	—	—	—
2004–05	Lukko	Liiga	29	0	3	3	16	—	—	—	—	—
2005–06	Lukko U20	Jr. A SM-liiga	20	3	7	10	22	9	1	1	2	16
2005–06	Lukko	Liiga	38	0	1	1	24	—	—	—	—	—
2005–06	Hokki	Mestis	3	0	0	0	6	—	—	—	—	—
2006–07	Lukko	Liiga	51	3	7	10	52	3	0	0	0	14
2006–07	FPS	Mestis	2	0	1	1	4	—	—	—	—	—
2007–08	Lukko	Liiga	11	0	4	4	6	—	—	—	—	—
2007–08	KalPa	Liiga	39	1	5	6	54	—	—	—	—	—
2008–09	Lukko	Liiga	57	2	14	16	71	—	—	—	—	—
2009–10	Lukko	Liiga	56	2	6	8	36	4	0	1	1	2
2010–11	Lukko	Liiga	54	2	4	6	106	10	1	4	5	37
2011–12	Lukko	Liiga	55	3	24	27	108	3	0	0	0	2
2012–13	Lukko	Liiga	57	1	9	10	40	14	1	0	1	8
2013–14	Lukko	Liiga	34	1	4	5	28	1	0	1	1	0
2013–14	LeKi	Mestis	1	0	0	0	0	—	—	—	—	—
2014–15	HIFK	Liiga	47	1	2	3	45	6	1	2	3	2
2014–15	Kiekko-Vantaa	Mestis	8	1	2	3	2	—	—	—	—	—
2015–16	LeKi	Mestis	3	0	0	0	0	—	—	—	—	—
2015–16	HPK	Liiga	24	0	2	2	12	—	—	—	—	—
2016–17	Stjernen Hockey	Norway	11	2	8	10	8	—	—	—	—	—
2016–17	Peliitat	Mestis	4	0	1	1	2	—	—	—	—	—
2016–17	Sport	Liiga	29	1	3	4	8	—	—	—	—	—
Liiga totals			587	17	88	105	608	49	3	9	12	69
