= Henri Heino =

Finnish ice hockey player

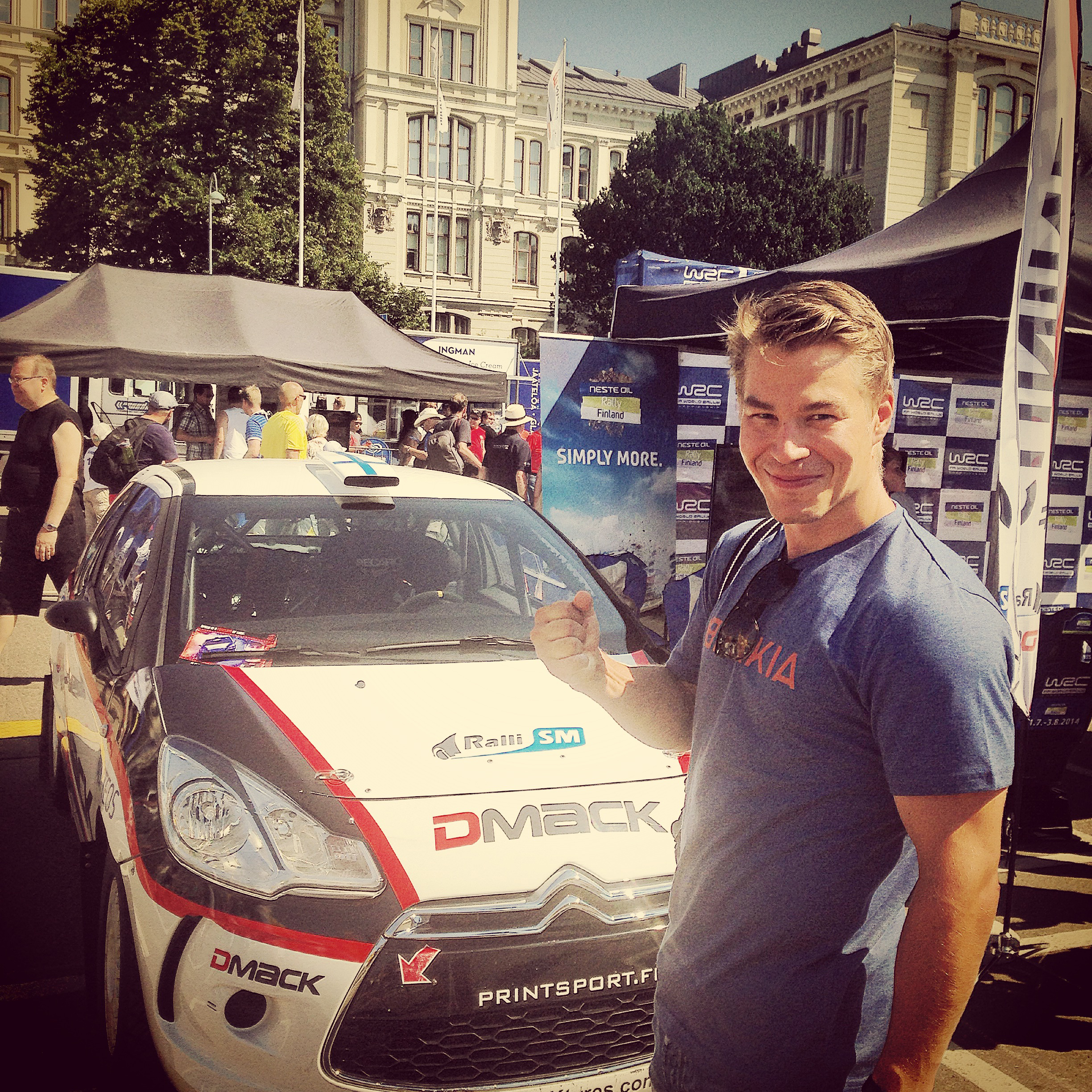
- Born: June 14, 1986 (age 39) Lahti, Finland
- Height: 5 ft 11 in (180 cm)
- Weight: 190 lb (86 kg; 13 st 8 lb)
- Position: Centre
- Shot: Left
- Played for: Pelicans; Jokerit; Porin Ässät; Peliitat Heinola; Frederikshavn White Hawks
- Playing career: 2003–2018

Henri Heino (born June 14, 1986) is a Finnish professional ice hockey forward who currently plays for Jokerit of the SM-liiga.

== Career statistics ==
			Regular season					Playoffs
Season	Team	League	GP	G	A	Pts	PIM	GP	G	A	Pts	PIM
2000–01	Kiekkoreipas U16	U16 SM-sarja	12	5	6	11	0	—	—	—	—	—
2001–02	Kiekkoreipas U16	U16 SM-sarja	2	2	1	3	2	2	1	0	1	0
2001–02	Kiekkoreipas U18	U18 SM-sarja	20	4	5	9	0	—	—	—	—	—
2002–03	Kiekkoreipas U18	U18 SM-sarja	25	8	10	18	6	4	2	3	5	2
2003–04	Kiekkoreipas U18	U18 SM-sarja	1	0	1	1	0	4	2	1	3	0
2003–04	Lahti Pelicans U20	U20 SM-liiga	39	5	4	9	14	—	—	—	—	—
2003–04	Lahti Pelicans	SM-liiga	1	0	0	0	0	—	—	—	—	—
2004–05	Lahti Pelicans U20	U20 SM-liiga	34	2	16	18	37	3	0	1	1	0
2004–05	Lahti Pelicans	SM-liiga	10	0	1	1	0	—	—	—	—	—
2005–06	Lahti Pelicans U20	U20 SM-liiga	13	5	6	11	0	—	—	—	—	—
2005–06	Lahti Pelicans	SM-liiga	46	1	4	5	14	—	—	—	—	—
2005–06	Suomi U20	Mestis	5	2	1	3	2	—	—	—	—	—
2006–07	Lahti Pelicans	SM-liiga	56	5	12	17	24	6	0	0	0	2
2007–08	Lahti Pelicans	SM-liiga	56	7	2	9	12	6	0	0	0	2
2008–09	Lahti Pelicans	SM-liiga	58	9	13	22	16	10	2	1	3	2
2009–10	Lahti Pelicans	SM-liiga	56	10	8	18	14	—	—	—	—	—
2010–11	Lahti Pelicans	SM-liiga	45	5	5	10	16	—	—	—	—	—
2010–11	Jokerit	SM-liiga	15	1	0	1	4	7	0	0	0	2
2011–12	Jokerit	SM-liiga	60	7	5	12	10	10	0	0	0	0
2012–13	Jokerit	SM-liiga	40	2	10	12	14	6	1	1	2	2
2013–14	Porin Ässät	Liiga	60	13	10	23	20	—	—	—	—	—
2014–15	Porin Ässät	Liiga	60	8	10	18	10	2	0	1	1	0
2015–16	Lahti Pelicans	Liiga	29	4	3	7	8	9	0	0	0	2
2015–16	Peliitat Heinola	Mestis	1	0	1	1	0	—	—	—	—	—
2016–17	Lahti Pelicans	Liiga	59	6	7	13	20	4	0	0	0	0
2017–18	Peliitat Heinola	Mestis	15	1	1	2	0	—	—	—	—	—
2017–18	Frederikshavn White Hawks	Denmark	4	0	1	1	0	4	1	1	2	0
SM-liiga totals			651	78	90	168	182	60	3	3	6	12
