= Daniel Grillfors =

Swedish ice hockey player

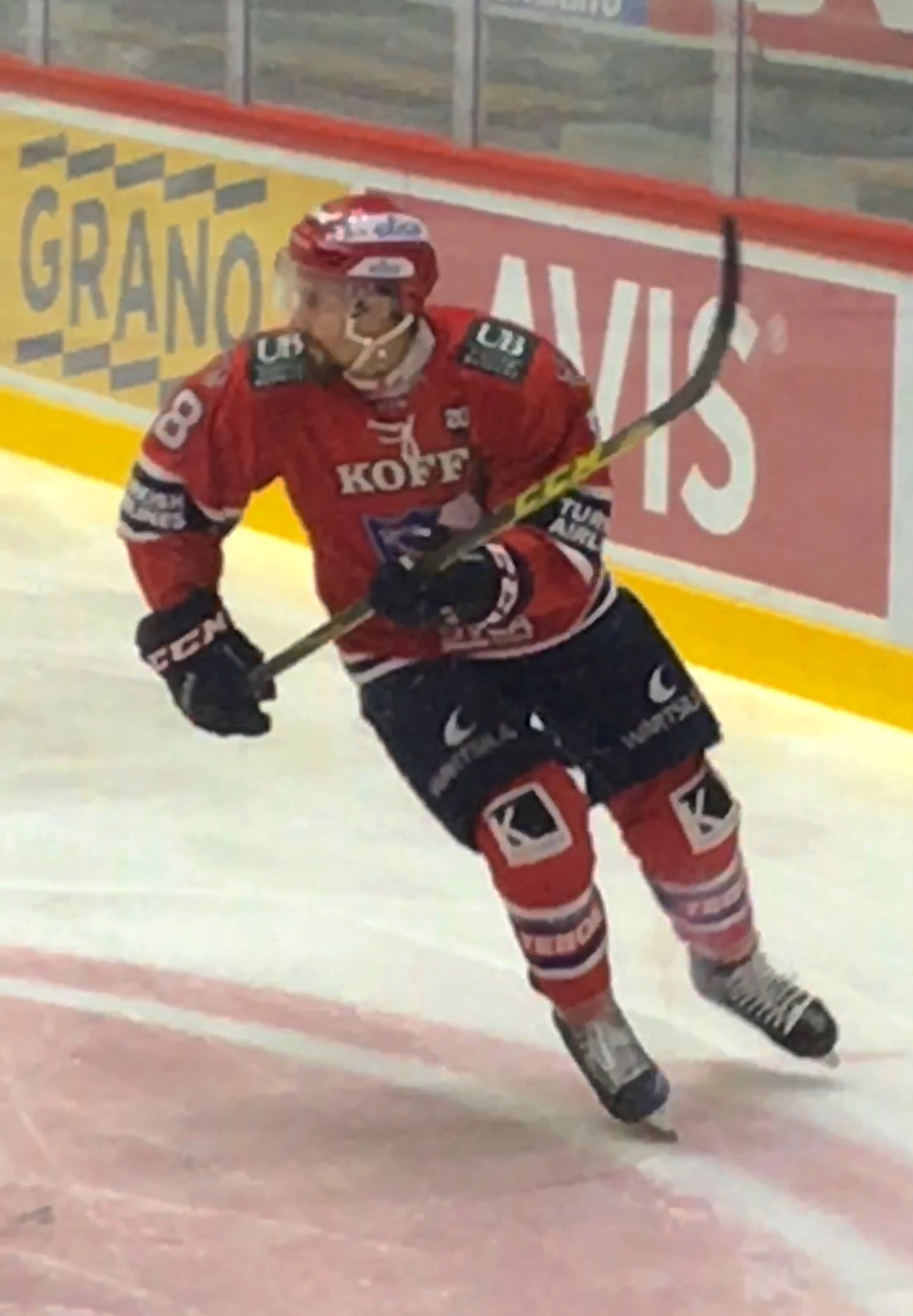
- Grillfors playing for HIFK Helsinki in 2016.
- Born: July 2, 1982 (age 42); Enköping, Sweden
- Height: 6 ft 3 in (191 cm)
- Weight: 190 lb (86 kg; 13 st 8 lb)
- Position: Defence
- Shot: Left
- Played for: HV71; Linköpings HC; SC Bern; HIFK; Mora IK
- Playing career: 2003–2019

Daniel Grillfors (born July 2, 1982) is a Swedish former professional ice hockey defenceman and current assistant coach to Mora IK of the HockeyAllsvenskan (Allsv).

Grillfors played in the Swedish Hockey League with HV71, Linköpings HC and Mora IK. He also played in the Swiss National League for SC Bern and in the Finnish Liiga for HIFK.

He concluded his playing career with Mora IK in the 2018–19 season, announcing his retirement due to injury, he immediately accepted an assistant coaching role to continue with Mora IK in the Allsvenskan on 24 May 2019.

== Career statistics ==
			Regular season					Playoffs
Season	Team	League	GP	G	A	Pts	PIM	GP	G	A	Pts	PIM
1997–98	Enköpings SK HK	Division 2	5	0	0	0	0	—	—	—	—	—
1999–00	Västerås IK J18	J18 Allsvenskan	5	4	2	6	6	—	—	—	—	—
1999–00	Västerås IK J20	J20 SuperElit	36	3	8	11	12	—	—	—	—	—
2000–01	VIK Hockey Ungdom	Division 2	36	18	22	40	6	—	—	—	—	—
2001–02	VIK Hockey Ungdom	Division 1	48	7	20	27	47	10	0	2	2	39
2002–03	VIK Hockey Ungdom	Allsvenskan	42	9	11	20	53	—	—	—	—	—
2003–04	VIK Hockey Ungdom	Allsvenskan	46	4	6	10	34	—	—	—	—	—
2004–05	VIK Hockey Ungdom	Allsvenskan	46	11	21	32	32	—	—	—	—	—
2005–06	VIK Västerås HK	Allsvenskan	32	6	12	18	20	—	—	—	—	—
2005–06	HV71	SHL	9	0	1	1	0	9	1	1	2	2
2006–07	HV71	SHL	50	2	5	7	18	14	0	0	0	0
2007–08	HV71 J20	J20 SuperElit	1	0	2	2	0	—	—	—	—	—
2007–08	HV71	SHL	55	1	5	6	24	17	0	1	1	10
2008–09	HV71	SHL	45	4	9	13	16	18	1	1	2	6
2009–10	HV71	SHL	53	2	14	16	28	16	0	3	3	8
2010–11	HV71	SHL	54	7	9	16	26	3	0	1	1	0
2011–12	HV71	SHL	54	11	9	20	43	6	1	0	1	2
2012–13	Linköping HC	SHL	43	2	6	8	20	10	1	0	1	0
2013–14	Linköping HC	SHL	44	1	7	8	16	—	—	—	—	—
2013–14	SC Bern	NLA	3	0	1	1	0	—	—	—	—	—
2014–15	HIFK	Liiga	50	1	16	17	22	6	0	2	2	0
2015–16	HIFK	Liiga	43	3	14	17	8	9	0	1	1	2
2016–17	HIFK	Liiga	46	1	13	14	37	8	1	1	2	0
2017–18	Mora IK	SHL	37	4	4	8	10	—	—	—	—	—
2018–19	Mora IK	SHL	—	—	—	—	—	—	—	—	—	—
SHL totals			444	34	69	103	201	98	4	9	13	28
