= Iiro Tarkki =

Finnish ice hockey player

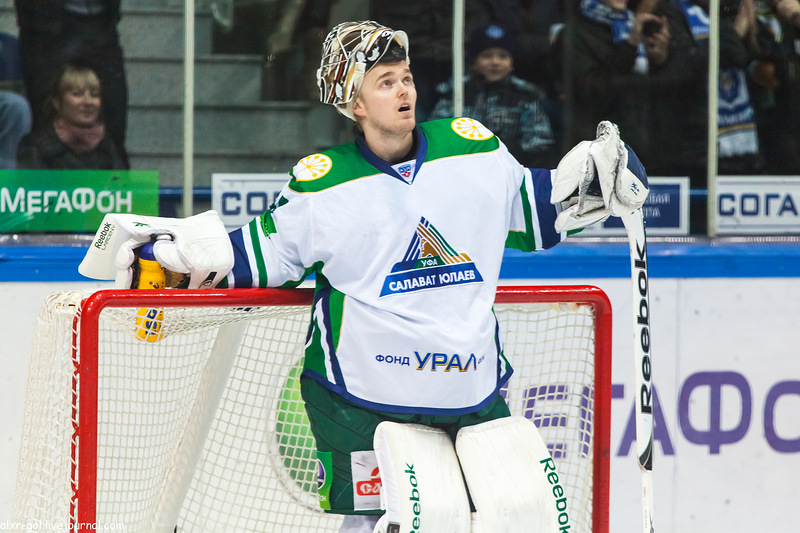
- Tarkki with Salavat Yulaev Ufa in 2012
- Born: 1 July 1985 (age 41) Rauma, Finland
- Height: 6 ft 2 in (188 cm)
- Weight: 192 lb (87 kg; 13 st 10 lb)
- Position: Goaltender
- Caught: Left
- Played for: Lukko; SaiPa; Espoo Blues; Anaheim Ducks; Salavat Yulaev Ufa; Linköpings HC; Oulun Kärpät
- NHL draft: Undrafted
- Playing career: 2004–2015

Iiro Tarkki (born 1 July 1985) is a Finnish former professional ice hockey goaltender who last played with Oulun Kärpät of the Finnish Liiga. He played a solitary game in the National Hockey League (NHL) with the Anaheim Ducks. He is the younger brother of goaltender Tuomas Tarkki.

== Playing career ==
Tarkki originally played professionally in his native Finland with Lukko, SaiPa and the Espoo Blues of the SM-liiga. On 6 May 2011, Tarkki signed as an undrafted free agent to a one-year entry-level contract with the Anaheim Ducks.

Tarkki made his NHL debut for the Ducks on 8 January 2012, against the Columbus Blue Jackets, after primary goaltender Jonas Hiller was injured late in the first period. He led the Ducks to a 7–4 victory and racked up his first career NHL win.

On 2 October 2013, he became free agent after cancellation of a contract with Salavat Yulaev Ufa of the Kontinental Hockey League (KHL). On 18 November 2013, he moved to the Swedish Hockey League, in agreeing to a contract for the remainder of the season with Linköpings HC.

Having later returned to the Finnish Liiga, during his second season with Oulun Kärpät, Tarkki appeared in 12 games for the 2015–16 season, before his contract was terminated and immediately ended his professional career on 31 December 2015.

== Career statistics ==
			Regular season									Playoffs
Season	Team	League	GP	W	L	T/OT	MIN	GA	SO	GAA	SV%	GP	W	L	MIN	GA	SO	GAA	SV%
2004–05	Lukko	SM-l	1	0	0	0	20	0	0	0.00	1.000	—	—	—	—	—	—	—	—
2006–07	SaiPa	SM-l	2	1	1	0	120	7	0	3.50	.841	—	—	—	—	—	—	—	—
2007–08	SaiPa	SM-l	40	10	19	7	2331	94	4	2.42	.910	—	—	—	—	—	—	—	—
2008–09	SaiPa	SM-l	48	14	27	6	2753	129	1	2.81	.914	3	3	0	189	6	0	1.90	.938
2009–10	Espoo Blues	SM-l	54	22	22	9	3228	131	2	2.44	.918	3	1	2	220	7	0	1.91	.937
2010–11	Espoo Blues	SM-l	55	20	20	14	3218	112	5	2.09	.924	18	10	8	1097	40	3	2.19	.924
2011–12	Syracuse Crunch	AHL	50	24	17	4	2788	114	2	2.45	.925	4	1	3	244	15	0	3.68	.881
2011–12	Anaheim Ducks	NHL	1	1	0	0	41	3	0	4.39	.700	—	—	—	—	—	—	—	—
2012–13	Salavat Yulaev Ufa	KHL	39	20	11	6	2278	90	4	2.37	.913	14	7	7	881	35	2	2.38	.918
2013–14	Salavat Yulaev Ufa	KHL	4	1	2	1	248	13	0	3.13	.906	—	—	—	—	—	—	—	—
2013–14	Linköpings HC	SHL	11	4	5	0	558	32	0	3.44	.891	—	—	—	—	—	—	—	—
2014–15	Oulun Kärpät	Liiga	23	11	5	6	1296	43	3	1.99	.921	13	7	5	726	25	2	2.07	.917
2015–16	Oulun Kärpät	Liiga	12	6	6	0	651	24	1	2.21	.915	—	—	—	—	—	—	—	—
NHL totals			1	1	0	0	41	3	0	4.39	.700	—	—	—	—	—	—	—	—
