= Mikko Komulainen =

Finnish ice hockey player

- Born: March 4, 1994 (age 31); Iisalmi, Finland
- Height: 5 ft 10 in (178 cm)
- Weight: 159 lb (72 kg; 11 st 5 lb)
- Position: Forward
- Shoots: Left
- Suomi-sarja team Former teams: D-Kiekko; KalPa
- NHL draft: Undrafted
- Playing career: 2013–present

Mikko Komulainen (born March 4, 1994) is a Finnish ice hockey player. He is currently playing with D-Kiekko in the Suomi-sarja, the third tier league in Finland.

Komulainen made his Liiga debut playing with KalPa during the 2013–14 Liiga season.
