= Simon Suoranta =

Finnish ice hockey player (born 1992)

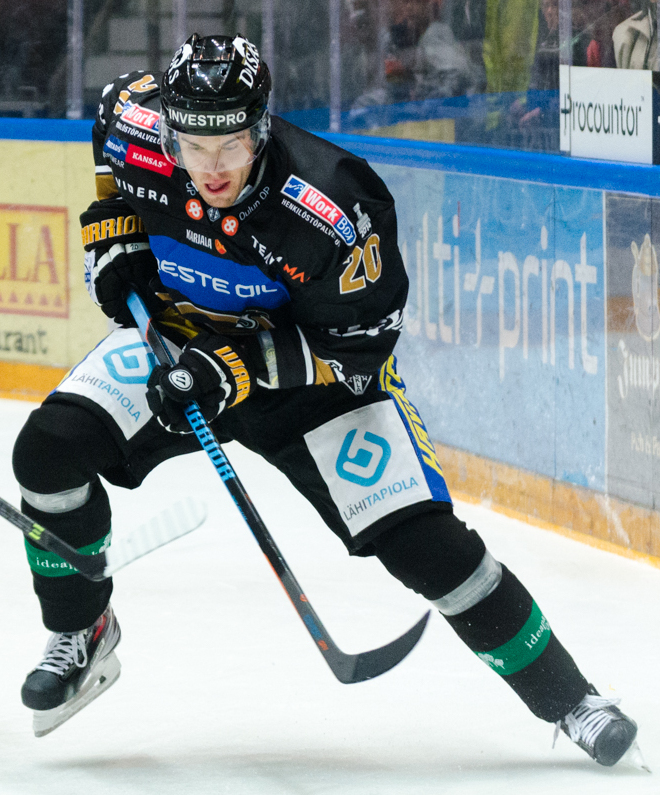
- Suoranta in 2014
- Born: 21 May 1992 (age 33) Vaasa, Finland
- Height: 6 ft 2 in (188 cm)
- Weight: 203 lb (92 kg; 14 st 7 lb)
- Position: Forward
- Shoots: Left
- Ligue Magnus team Former teams: Spartiates de Marseille; Dragons de Rouen; Oulun Kärpät; Ässät; HC TPS; Vaasan Sport; Nottingham Panthers
- NHL draft: Undrafted
- Playing career: 2011–present

Simon Suoranta (born 21 May 1992) is a Finnish professional ice hockey player currently signed to French Ligue Magnus side Dragons de Rouen. He last played for the Nottingham Panthers of the UK's Elite Ice Hockey League (EIHL).

Suoranta made his SM-Liiga debut playing with Oulun Kärpät during the 2011–12 SM-liiga season.

He played 22 games for Ässät before suffering an injury that kept him out for the rest of the 2017–18 season. In May 2018, Suoranta joined HC TPS, making his season debut on 14 November against Vaasan Sport.

After an 18-month spell with Vaasan Sport, Suoranta agreed to his first contract outside Finland and signed with English side Nottingham Panthers in July 2021. He departed Nottingham in December 2021, along with compatriot Tommi Jokinen.

In January 2022, Suoranta moved to France to sign for top-flight side Dragons de Rouen.

== Career statistics ==
			Regular season					Playoffs
Season	Team	League	GP	G	A	Pts	PIM	GP	G	A	Pts	PIM
2010–11	Sport U20	Jr. A SM-liiga	42	7	18	25	26	-	-	-	-	-
2010–11	Finland U19	International Jr.	5	1	2	3	2	-	-	-	-	-
2011–12	Kärpät U20	Jr. A SM-liiga	27	2	11	13	24	3	0	0	0	0
2011–12	Kärpät	SM-liiga	2	0	0	0	0	-	-	-	-	-
2011–12	Finland U20	International Jr.	7	1	1	2	4	-	-	-	-	-
2012–13	Kärpät U20	Jr. A SM-liiga	7	0	3	3	2	-	-	-	-	-
2012–13	Kärpät	SM-liiga	47	4	1	5	10	3	0	1	1	0
2013–14	Kärpät U20	Jr. A SM-liiga	3	0	0	0	0	-	-	-	-	-
2013–14	Kärpät	Liiga	52	5	7	12	22	7	0	1	1	2
2014–15	Kärpät	Liiga	41	4	4	8	14	9	2	0	2	27
2014–15	Hokki	Mestis	5	0	1	1	2	-	-	-	-	-
2015–16	Kärpät	Liiga	39	3	2	5	14	6	0	0	0	14
2016–17	Ässät	Liiga	53	18	16	34	45	3	0	0	0	0
2017–18	Ässät	Liiga	22	8	10	18	6	-	-	-	-	-
2018–19	HC TPS	Liiga	23	7	6	13	8	2	0	0	0	0
2019–20	HC TPS	Liiga	27	3	2	5	8	-	-	-	-	-
2019–20	Sport	Liiga	17	1	4	5	4	-	-	-	-	-
2020–21	Sport	Liiga	38	3	4	7	12	-	-	-	-	-
2021–22	Nottingham Panthers	EIHL	12	2	2	4	4	-	-	-	-	-
2021–22	Dragons de Rouen	Ligue Magnus	17	2	7	9	6	3	1	0	1	0
Liiga Totals			361	56	56	112	143	33	3	2	5	45
