= Markus Poukkula =

Finnish ice hockey player

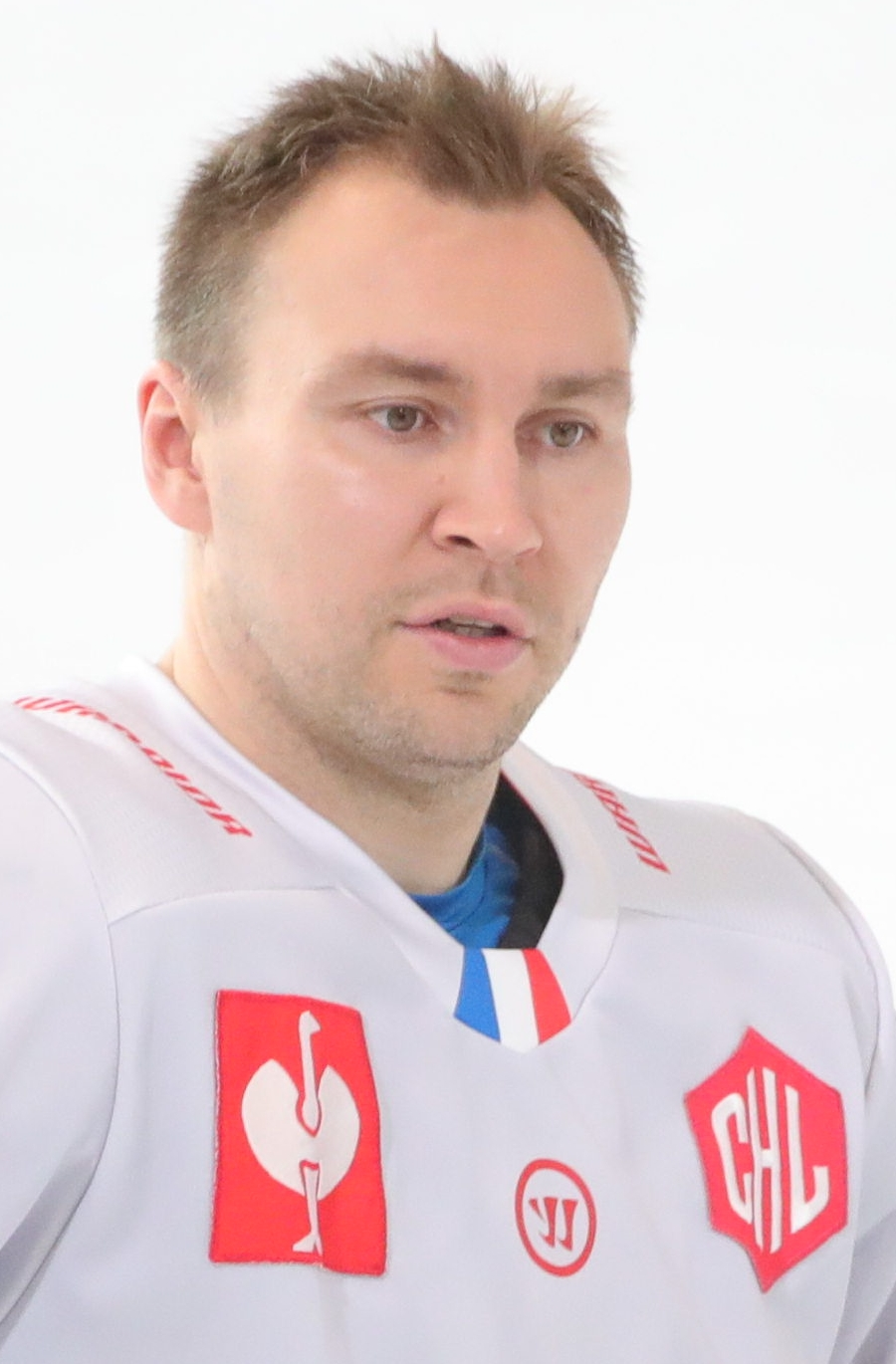
- Born: September 24, 1988 (age 37) Raahe, Finland
- Height: 5 ft 11 in (180 cm)
- Weight: 194 lb (88 kg; 13 st 12 lb)
- Position: Forward
- Shoots: Left
- Synerglace Ligue Magnus team Former teams: Brûleurs de Loups; Schwenninger Wild Wings; JYP Jyväskylä; SaiPa; Espoo Blues
- Playing career: 2008–present

Markus Poukkula (born September 24, 1988) is a Finnish professional ice hockey player who currently playing for Brûleurs de Loups of the French Synerglace Ligue Magnus.

== Playing career ==
Poukkula made his professional debut in his native Finland with JYP Jyväskylä of the then SM-liiga. After parts of 7 seasons within the Liiga, Poukkula left Finland as a mid-season transfer from the Espoo Blues, to sign his first contract abroad in Germany with top flight club, Schwenninger Wild Wings of the DEL for the remainder of the 2015–16 season on January 17, 2016.

Having contributed with 8 points in 14 games as Schwenninger missed the post-season, Poukkula was signed to a one-year contract extension to remain with the Wild Wings on March 13, 2016.
