= Sami Mutanen =

Finnish ice hockey player

- Born: 20 September 1984 (age 41) Joensuu, Finland
- Height: 6 ft 0 in (183 cm)
- Weight: 205 lb (93 kg; 14 st 9 lb)
- Position: Forward
- Shot: Left
- Played for: Espoo Blues; Ässät; KalPa; KooKoo
- NHL draft: Undrafted
- Playing career: 2003–2020

Sami Mutanen (born 20 September 1984) is a Finnish former professional ice hockey forward who played in the Liiga for the Espoo Blues, Ässät, KalPa, and KooKoo.
