= Arttu Luttinen =

Finnish ice hockey player

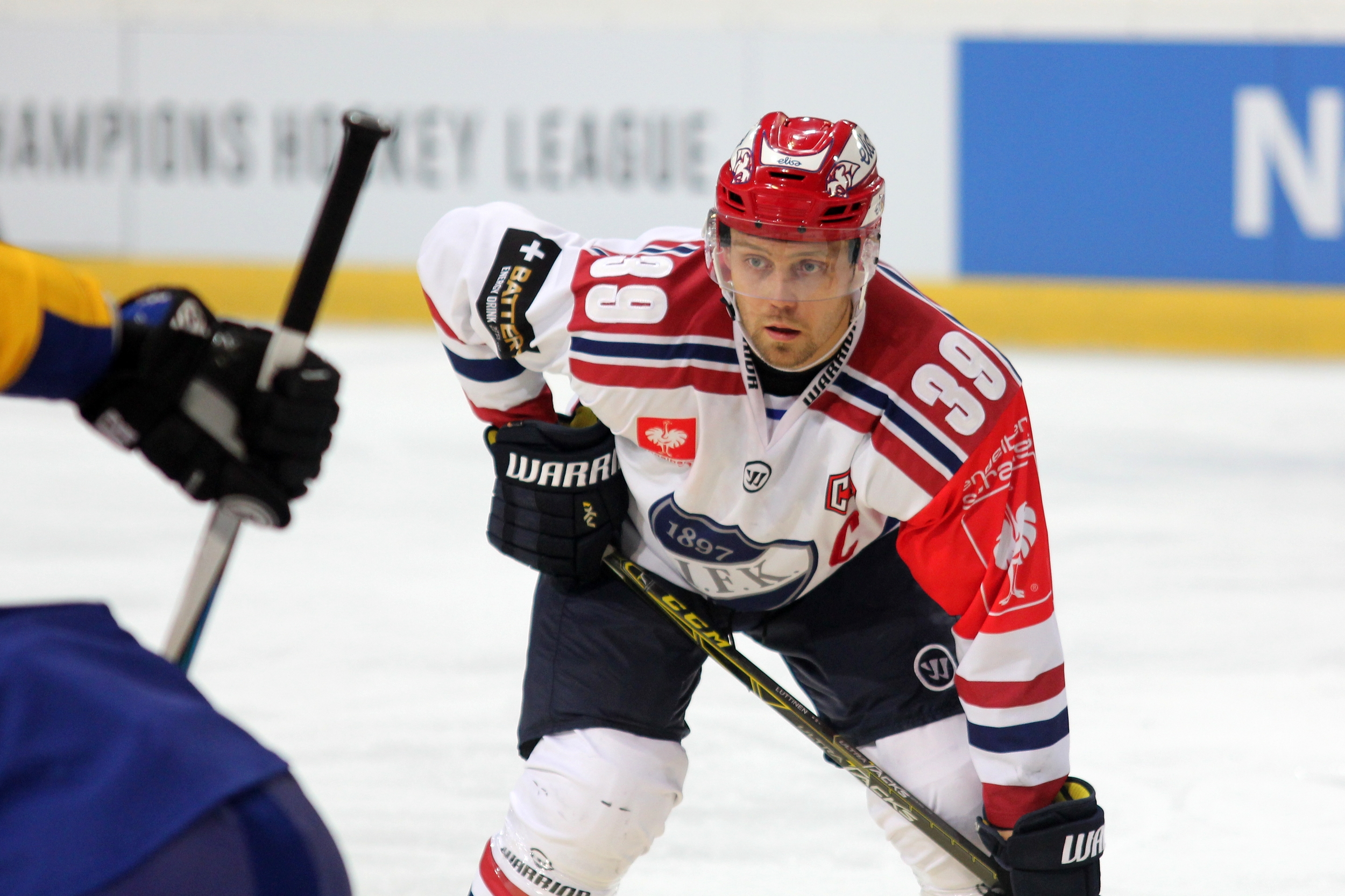
- Born: September 3, 1983 (age 42) Helsinki, Finland
- Height: 6 ft 0 in (183 cm)
- Weight: 203 lb (92 kg; 14 st 7 lb)
- Position: Left wing
- Shot: Left
- Liiga team Former teams: HIFK; Binghamton Senators; Espoo Blues; Lahti Pelicans
- NHL draft: 75th overall, 2002; Ottawa Senators
- Playing career: 2002–2019

Arttu Luttinen (born September 3, 1983) is a Finnish professional ice hockey forward who currently plays for HIFK of the Liiga. He was selected by the Ottawa Senators in the 3rd round (75th overall) of the 2002 NHL entry draft.

== Career statistics ==
			Regular season					Playoffs
Season	Team	League	GP	G	A	Pts	PIM	GP	G	A	Pts	PIM
1999–2000	HIFK	FIN U18	—	—	—	—	—	2	0	0	0	2
2000–01	HIFK	FIN U18	20	14	20	34	141	3	0	3	3	2
2000–01	HIFK	FIN U20	8	4	2	6	4	8	0	1	1	2
2001–02	HIFK	FIN U20	24	16	17	33	60	1	0	0	0	0
2002–03	HIFK	FIN U20	10	8	9	17	52	8	4	6	10	20
2002–03	HIFK	SM-liiga	41	4	4	8	10	1	0	0	0	0
2002–03	FPS	Mestis	2	0	1	1	4	—	—	—	—	—
2003–04	HIFK	FIN U20	1	0	0	0	0	—	—	—	—	—
2003–04	HIFK	SM-liiga	50	1	7	8	12	12	0	0	0	0
2003–04	Haukat	Mestis	1	0	0	0	0	—	—	—	—	—
2003–04	Ahmat	Mestis	4	3	2	5	2	—	—	—	—	—
2004–05	HIFK	SM-liiga	56	12	13	25	67	5	1	0	1	0
2005–06	HIFK	SM-liiga	56	18	26	44	66	12	4	3	7	39
2006–07	Binghamton Senators	AHL	74	12	17	29	53	—	—	—	—	—
2007–08	HIFK	SM-liiga	47	6	10	16	48	7	2	0	2	8
2008–09	HIFK	SM-liiga	57	23	16	39	76	2	1	1	2	0
2009–10	HIFK	SM-liiga	58	12	20	32	48	6	1	2	3	2
2010–11	Blues	SM-liiga	59	15	12	27	75	18	5	2	7	12
2011–12	Pelicans	SM-liiga	59	18	17	35	106	17	8	2	10	6
2012–13	HIFK	SM-liiga	56	10	14	24	28	2	0	0	0	0
2013–14	HIFK	Liiga	59	9	15	24	63	2	0	0	0	2
2014–15	HIFK	Liiga	54	19	14	33	32	8	1	3	4	14
2015–16	HIFK	Liiga	56	17	9	26	49	18	5	3	8	6
2016–17	HIFK	Liiga	41	6	6	12	22	10	0	0	0	2
2017–18	Fehérvár AV19	AUT	53	11	17	28	34	—	—	—	—	—
2018–19	Fehérvár AV19	AUT	36	11	13	24	22	6	3	1	4	4
SM-liiga/Liiga totals			749	170	183	353	702	120	28	16	44	91
