= Miika Lahti =

Finnish ice hockey player

- Born: 6 February 1987 (age 38); Konnevesi, Finland
- Height: 6 ft 2 in (188 cm)
- Weight: 220 lb (100 kg; 15 st 10 lb)
- Position: Centre
- Shoots: Left
- team Former teams: Free agent JYP Jyväskylä; Kunlun Red Star
- Playing career: 2005–present

Miika Lahti (born 6 February 1987) is a Finnish professional ice hockey centre. He is currently playing for EC VSV of the Erste Bank Hockey League.

== Playing career ==
Lahti played exclusively with JYP until the 2016–17 season, leaving to join inaugural Chinese club, Kunlun Red Star of the Kontinental Hockey League (KHL).

At the conclusion of his contract, Lahti opted to return to his original club, JYP, however sat out the following 2017–18 season, due to rehabilitating a hip injury. He returned to playing in the 2018–19 season, securing a one-year deal on May 25, 2018.
