= Juha Metsola =

Finnish ice hockey player

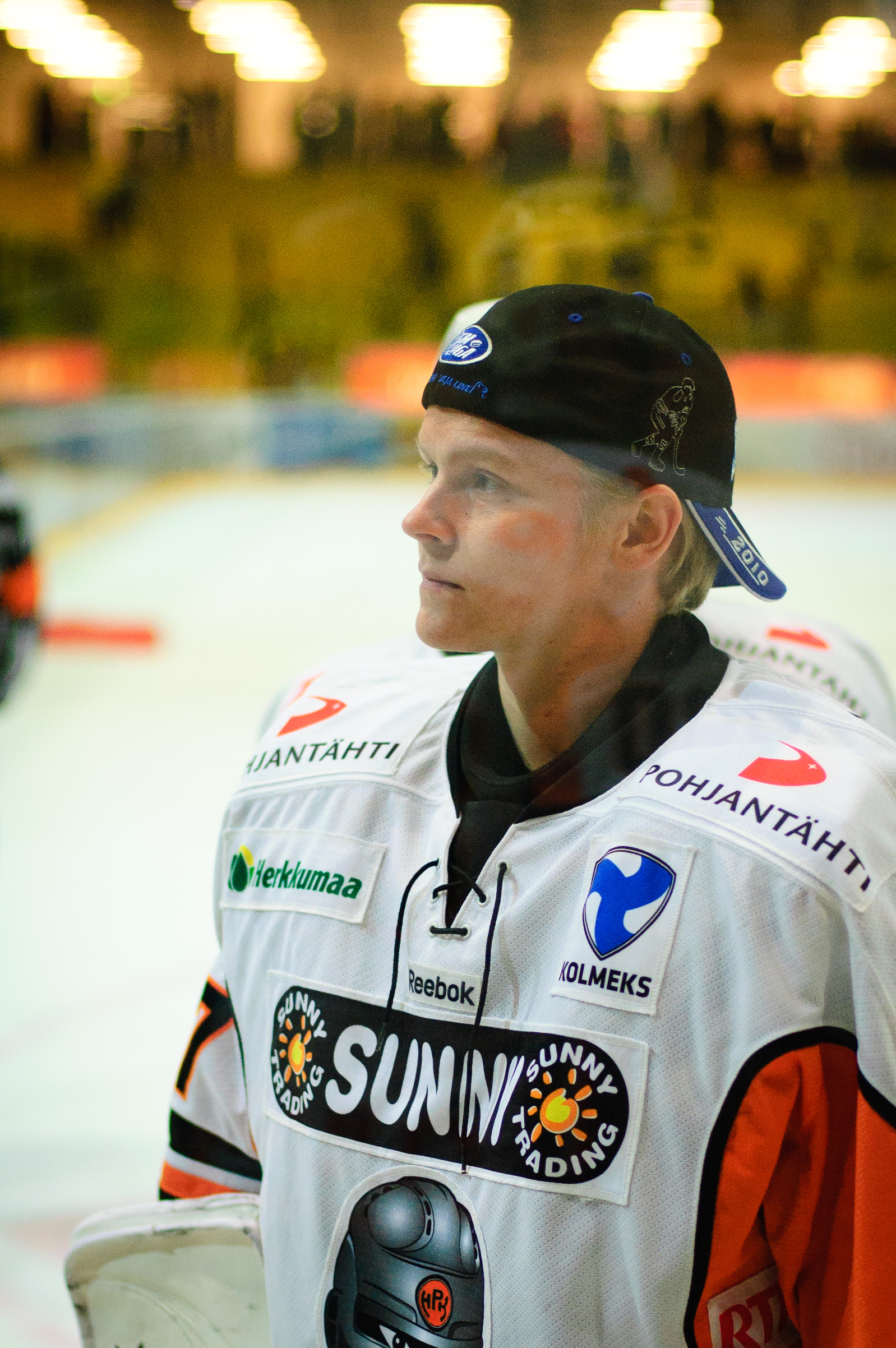
- Metsola with HPK in 2010
- Born: February 24, 1989 (age 36); Tampere, Finland
- Height: 5 ft 10 in (178 cm)
- Weight: 165 lb (75 kg; 11 st 11 lb)
- Position: Goaltender
- Shoots: Left
- NL team Former teams: EHC Kloten; HPK; Ilves; Tappara; Amur Khabarovsk; Salavat Yulaev Ufa
- National team: Finland
- NHL draft: Undrafted
- Playing career: 2009–present

Juha Antero Metsola (born February 24, 1989) is a Finnish professional ice hockey goaltender who currently plays for EHC Kloten of the National League (NL).

== Playing career ==
Prior to the 2018–19 season, Metsola joined Salavat Yulaev Ufa as a free agent, signing a two-year contract on May 1, 2018, after spending the previous three seasons in the KHL with Amur Khabarovsk.

In March 2022, Metsola left Salavat Yulaev Ufa during playoffs of the 2021–22 season, due to the Russian invasion of Ukraine.

On 1 May 2022, Avtomobilist Yekaterinburg of the KHL announced they had signed Metsola to a two-year contract. It was later revealed through his agent that Metsola signed the contract before the commencement of the Russian invasion of Ukraine and Metsola had no intention of fulfilling his contract with Avtomobilist. On 20 June 2022, Metsola was signed by Swiss club, EHC Kloten of the NL, to a one-year deal.
