= Markus Kankaanperä =

Finnish ice hockey player

- Born: April 27, 1980 (age 46) Skellefteå, SWE
- Height: 6 ft 0 in (183 cm)
- Weight: 209 lb (95 kg; 14 st 13 lb)
- Position: Defence
- Shoots: Left
- IceHL team Former teams: HC Bozen-Bolzano; JYP; HPK; Jokerit; Brynäs IF; HIFK; Tappara; Löwen Frankfurt; Jokipojat; Dundee Stars
- NHL draft: 218th overall, 1999; Vancouver Canucks
- Playing career: 1998–present

Markus Kankaanperä (born April 27, 1980) is a Finnish professional ice hockey defenceman, currently with HC Bozen-Bolzano of the Austrian IceHL. Kankaanperä was most recently a member of the Dundee Stars in the UK Elite Ice Hockey League (EIHL). He was drafted by the Vancouver Canucks as their eighth-round pick, 218th overall, in the 1999 NHL entry draft.
