= Mikko Niemelä =

Finnish ice hockey player

- Born: 9 October 1990 (age 35) Oulu, Finland
- Height: 6 ft 2 in (188 cm)
- Weight: 192 lb (87 kg; 13 st 10 lb)
- Position: Defence
- Shot: Right
- Played for: Oulun Kärpät; Kiekko-Laser; Hokki; Lahti Pelicans; Brynäs IF; SaiPa
- Playing career: 2009–2025

Mikko Niemelä (born 9 October 1990) is a Finnish former ice hockey defenceman. He last played for SaiPa in the Finnish Liiga.

Niemelä made his SM-liiga debut playing with Oulun Kärpät during the 2008–09 SM-liiga season.

On 25 March 2026, Niemelä announced his retirement from professional hockey.
