= Mikko Kousa =

Finnish ice hockey player

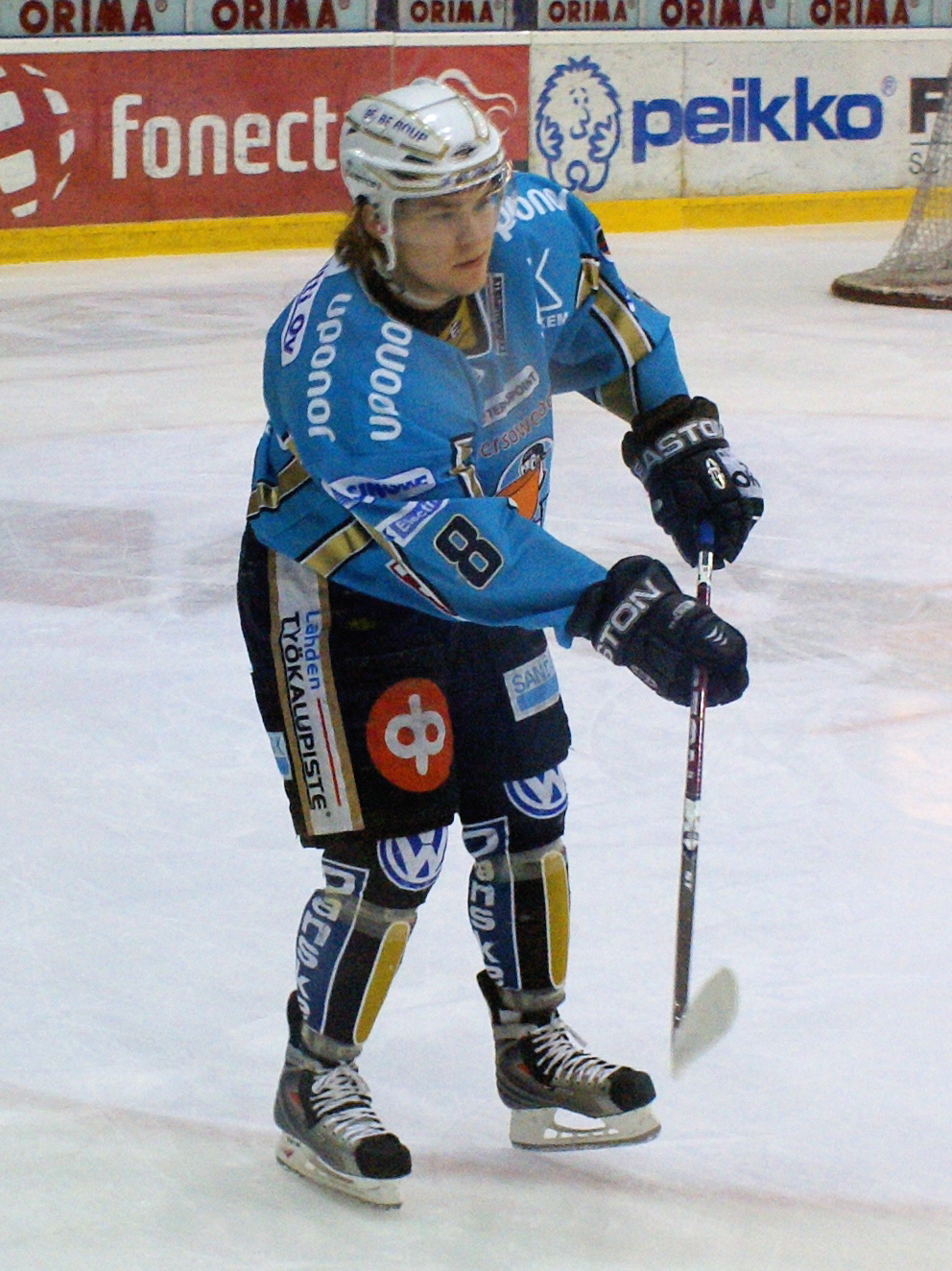
- Born: 11 May 1988 (age 36); Lahti, Finland
- Height: 175 cm (5 ft 9 in)
- Weight: 77 kg (170 lb; 12 st 2 lb)
- Position: Defence
- Shoots: Right
- team Former teams: SaiPa; Lahti Pelicans; HIFK; Torpedo Nizhny Novgorod; Modo Hockey; Jokerit; Lukko; Medveščak Zagreb; SC Bern; Djurgårdens IF; Düsseldorfer EG; HK Nitra
- National team: Finland
- Playing career: 2007–present

Mikko Kousa (born 11 May 1988) is a Finnish professional ice hockey defenceman who is currently playing for SaiPa of the Liiga.

== Playing career ==
He logged his first minutes in the Finnish top-flight Liiga during the 2007–08 season, representing the Lahti Pelicans. He later represented fellow Liiga clubs HIFK, Jokerit and Lukko, winning the title with HIFK in 2011.

Other stops in his resume include Torpedo Nizhny Novgorod and Medvescak Zagreb of the KHL, MODO Hockey of Sweden and SC Bern of Switzerland.

In early September 2016, he signed a deal with Lahti Pelicans of the Liiga.

== International play ==
Kousa has played internationally for the Finnish men's national team on several occasions, including the Euro Hockey Tour.
