= Rony Ahonen =

Finnish ice hockey player

- Born: 17 January 1987 (age 38); Porvoo, Finland
- Height: 6 ft 0 in (183 cm)
- Weight: 212 lb (96 kg; 15 st 2 lb)
- Position: Defence
- Shoots: Left
- Liiga team Former teams: HIFK; SaiPa; Lukko
- Playing career: 2006–present

Rony Ahonen (born 17 January 1987) is a Finnish professional ice hockey defenceman currently playing for HIFK of the Finnish Liiga. He has played with HIFK since the 2006–07 season.
