= Valtteri Virkkunen =

Finnish ice hockey player

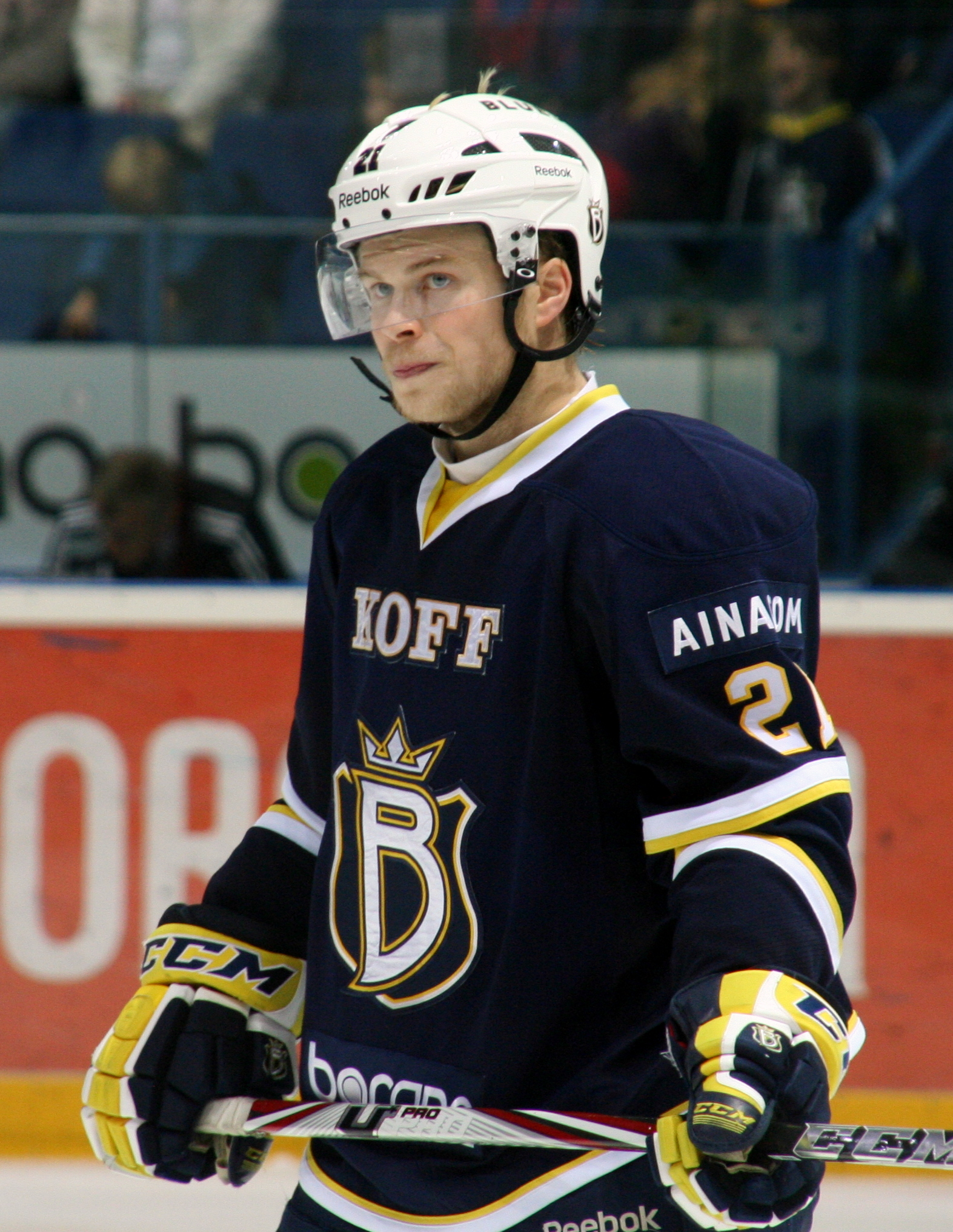
- Born: 18 February 1991 (age 34); Espoo, Finland
- Height: 5 ft 9 in (175 cm)
- Weight: 167 lb (76 kg; 11 st 13 lb)
- Position: Forward
- Shot: Left
- Liiga team Former teams: SaiPa; Espoo Blues
- NHL draft: Undrafted
- Playing career: 2009–2018

Medal record

Representing Finland

Ice hockey

IIHF World U18 Championships
Bronze medal – third place	2009 United States	

Valtteri Virkkunen (born 18 February 1991) is a Finnish former professional ice hockey forward who played for Espoo Blues and SaiPa in the Finnish Liiga. He competed for Finland and won a bronze medal at the 2009 IIHF World U18 Championships in the United States.
