= Jarkko Malinen =

Finnish ice hockey player

- Born: 17 March 1988 (age 37); Kuopio, Finland
- Height: 188 cm (6 ft 2 in)
- Weight: 83 kg (183 lb; 13 st 1 lb)
- Position: Forward
- Shoots: Left
- Liiga team Former teams: KooKoo; KalPa; Tappara
- Playing career: 2007–present

Jarkko Malinen is a Finnish professional ice hockey player currently playing for KooKoo of the Finnish Liiga.
