= Juuso Pulli =

Finnish ice hockey player

- Born: August 30, 1991 (age 33); Kouvola, Finland
- Height: 6 ft 1 in (185 cm)
- Weight: 203 lb (92 kg; 14 st 7 lb)
- Position: Defence
- Shoots: Left
- Liiga team Former teams: Ilves; Jyp
- NHL draft: Undrafted
- Playing career: 2011–present

Juuso Pulli (born August 30, 1991) is a Finnish ice hockey defenceman. He is currently playing with Ilves Tampere in the Finnish Liiga.

Pulli made his Liiga debut playing with JYP Jyväskylä during the 2013–14 Liiga season.
