= Joonas Komulainen =

Finnish ice hockey player

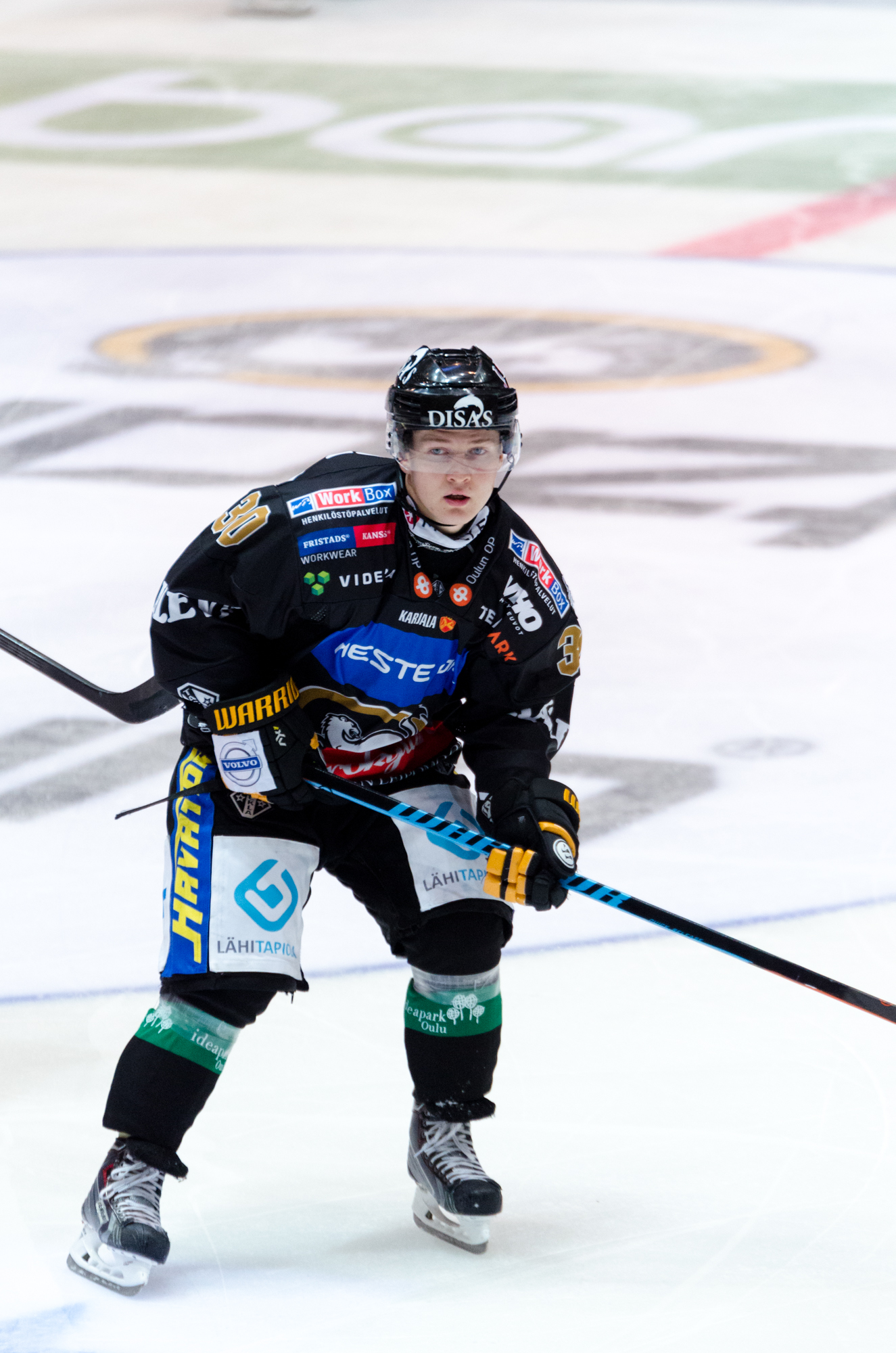
- Born: June 1, 1990 (age 36) Kuhmo, Finland
- Height: 5 ft 5 in (165 cm)
- Weight: 161 lb (73 kg; 11 st 7 lb)
- Position: Forward
- Shot: Left
- Played for: Oulun Kärpät; KalPa; Lukko; Vaasan Sport
- NHL draft: Undrafted
- Playing career: 2010–2019

Joonas Komulainen (born June 1, 1990) is a Finnish former ice hockey player. He played with KalPa, Oulun Kärpät, Lukko and Vaasan Sport in the Finnish Liiga.

Komulainen made his SM-liiga debut playing with Oulun Kärpät during the 2009–10 SM-liiga season.

On January 7, 2019, he announced his retirement due to an injury.
