= Olavi Vauhkonen =

Finnish ice hockey player

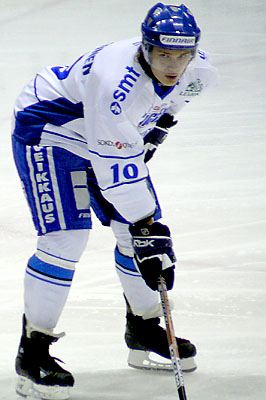
- Born: January 24, 1989 (age 36) Helsinki, Finland
- Height: 6 ft 4 in (193 cm)
- Weight: 240 lb (109 kg; 17 st 2 lb)
- Position: Wing
- Shoots: Right
- Tipsport extraliga team Former teams: HC Sparta Prague; Jokerit; SaiPa; Lukko; Vaasan Sport
- Playing career: 2008–present

Olavi Vauhkonen is a Finnish professional ice hockey winger who currently plays for Tappara of the Liiga.

Vauhkonen previously played for Jokerit, SaiPa, Lukko and Vaasan Sport.
