= 2014–15 Champions Hockey League group stage =

The group stage of the 2014–15 Champions Hockey League was played from August 21 to October 8 2014. A total of 44 teams competed in the group stage.

== Draw ==
The eleven groups were determined by a draw, which took place on May 21 2014 in Minsk, Belarus. The 44 teams were located into four seeding pots, consisting of 11 teams each with the highest ranked teams in pot 1 and the lowest ranked teams in pot 4, based on a special ranking criteria:

1. Champions of the six founding leagues,
2. Regular season winners of the six founding leagues,
3. Remaining A and B license teams according to placing within their leagues,
4. Wild card teams, according to placing within their leagues.

The teams were then drawn into eleven groups of four containing. One team from each of the four seeding pots, with the restriction that teams from the same national association could not be drawn against each other.

These fixtures were decided after the draw was released on June 2 2014.

== Teams ==
Below are the 44 teams in the group stage, grouped by their seeding pot, based on their ranking. Where teams finished in the same place in their respective leagues, they were ranked according to the IIHF World Ranking of the leagues.

Key to colours in group tables
Group winners and the five best runners-up advanced to the playoffs

Pot 1 Team (Sweden) Skellefteå AIK (Finland) Oulun Kärpät (Czech Republic) PSG Zlín (Switzerland) ZSC Lions (Germany) ERC Ingolstadt (Italy) HC Bolzano (Czech Republic) Sparta Prague (Germany) Hamburg Freezers (Austria) Red Bull Salzburg (Sweden) Frölunda HC (Finland) Tappara	Pot 2 Team (Czech Republic) Oceláři Třinec (Switzerland) Fribourg-Gottéron (Germany) Krefeld Pinguine (Sweden) Färjestad BK (Switzerland) Kloten Flyers (Germany) Kölner Haie (Sweden) Växjö Lakers (Finland) Lukko (Austria) Villach SV (Sweden) Linköping HC (Finland) SaiPa	Pot 3 Team (Switzerland) Genève-Servette (Austria) Vienna Capitals (Germany) Adler Mannheim (Finland) JYP (Sweden) Luleå Hockey (Czech Republic) HC Pardubice (Czech Republic) Vítkovice Steel (Germany) Eisbären Berlin (Finland) HIFK (Czech Republic) Bílí Tygři Liberec (Switzerland) SC Bern	Pot 4 Team (Sweden) HV71 (Switzerland) EV Zug (Finland) TPS (Finland) KalPa (Sweden) Djurgårdens IF (Norway) Stavanger Oilers (Slovakia) HC Košice (France) Briançon Diables Rouges (Denmark) SønderjyskE (Norway) Vålerenga IF (United Kingdom) Nottingham Panthers

== Format ==
The 44 teams were divided into eleven groups of four teams each. In each group, teams play against each other home-and-away in a round-robin format, giving six games per team. In total, 132 games were played in the group stage. The 11 group winners and the five best ranked runners-up qualified for the playoffs. The five best runners-up were determined by ranking all runners-up based on their number of points and goal differential in their respective groups, explained more detailed in section ranking of second-placed teams.

The matches are played in 60 minutes (3 periods with 20 minutes each) with the winning team receiving three points (the losing teams gets zero points). If a match ended with a draw both teams received one point and the game proceeded to a five-minute overtime (with teams playing with 3 players instead of regular five) to determine a winner of a bonus point. The first team to score in overtime wins the match and the bonus point. If the overtime ends scoreless a shootout is used to determine the winner (and who gets the bonus point). The teams take five penalties each and the teams who scored most penalties takes the win, sometimes the shootout is also a draw extra penalties are used to determine the winners if still tied after 5 shots.

=== Tiebreakers ===
The teams are ranked according to points (2 points for a win in regular time, 1 points for a win in overtime or shootout, 1 point for a loss in overtime or shootout, 0 points for a loss in regular time). If two or more teams are equal on points on completion of the group matches, the following criteria are applied to determine the rankings:

1. Most points in games against other tied teams;
2. Best goal difference in games against other tied teams;
3. Most goals scored in games against other tied teams;

Once a team is separated from the group of some tied teams, the remaining teams will return to criteria 1.

If two teams still remain tied and their two mutual games were decided in overtime or a penalty shootout, an overtime victory will be considered greater than a shootout victory. If both games were decided in shootouts, then the team that scored the most total goals in the two shootouts will be ranked ahead. Note that these criteria would only apply if only two teams remain tied.

If a tie still remains between two or more teams, the teams will be ranked in order of their finish in their most recent national championship (champion, runner-up, two remaining semi-finalists ranked by regular-season standings, four remaining quarter-finalists ranked by regular-season standings). If they finished in the same position in their respective leagues, the CHL Club Ranking will be used, which is same ranking used when seeding the clubs ahead of the group stage.

== Groups ==
The group stage began on 21 August 2014 and ended on 8 October 2014. The match days were 21–22 August, 23–24 August, 4–5 September, 6–7 September, 23–24 September and 7–8 October 2014. All match times are local times.

Key to colours in group tables
Group winners and the five best runners-up advanced to the playoffs

=== Group A ===
Pos	Team	Pld	W	OTW	OTL	L	GF	GA	GD	Pts
1	(Finland) Kärpät	6	3	2	0	1	17	12	+5	13
2	(Czech Republic) Bílí Tygři Liberec	6	3	0	0	3	16	15	+1	9
3	(Slovakia) HC Košice	6	2	0	1	3	14	16	−2	7
4	(Germany) Kölner Haie	6	2	0	1	3	12	16	−4	7

21 August 2014; 19:30	Kölner Haie (Germany)	2–1 (1–0, 1–1, 0–0)	(Slovakia) HC Košice	Lanxess Arena, Cologne; Attendance: 3,774

Game reference

Danny aus den Birken
Goalies
Marcel Melichercik
Referees:
(Sweden) Sören Persson
(Germany) Markus Krawinkel
Linesmen:
(Germany) Benjamin Hoppe
(Germany) Christoph Hurtik

A. Sulzer (J. Johnson) - 12:39	1–0
A. Falk (P. Gogulla, E. Rankin) (PP) – 34:34	2–0
	2–1	38:43 – J. Bicek (M. Kolena) (PP)

12 min
Penalties
4 min
30
Shots
21

21 August 2014; 20:00	Bílí Tygři Liberec (Czech Republic)	3–4 (0–2, 2–2, 1–0)	(Finland) Oulun Kärpät	Tipsport Arena, Liberec; Attendance: 1,449

Game reference

Jan Lasak
Marek Schwarz
Goalies
Tomi Karhunen
Referees:
(Sweden) Wolmer Edqvist
(Czech Republic) Martin Fraňo
Linesmen:
(Czech Republic) David Jelinek
(Czech Republic) Tomáš Pešek

	0–1	2:56 - P. Davis (N. Deschamps)
	0–2	19:39 - J. Junttila (J. Kemppainen, D. Spang) (SH)
	0–3	23:04 - D. Spang (I. Huml, J. Kemppainen)
	0–4	27:09 - S. Suoranta (R. Glenn)
T. Filippi (M. Bulir) - 28:39	1–4
M. Bulir (J. Valsky) - 38:59	2–4
M. Bartek (T. Filippi, M. Bulir) - 45:37	3–4

4 min
Penalties
4 min
25
Shots
22

23 August 2014; 17:30	HC Košice (Slovakia)	1–2 (1–2, 0–0, 0–0)	(Finland) Oulun Kärpät	Steel Aréna, Košice; Attendance: 6,104

Game reference

23 August 2014; 17:45	Kölner Haie (Germany)	1–4 (1–1, 0–2, 0–1)	(Czech Republic) Bílí Tygři Liberec	Lanxess Arena, Cologne; Attendance: 4,088

Game reference

4 September 2014; 17:30	Bílí Tygři Liberec (Czech Republic)	3–2 (1–0, 1–1, 1–1)	(Slovakia) HC Košice	Tipsport Arena, Liberec; Attendance: 1,693

Game reference

5 September 2014; 18:30	Oulun Kärpät (Finland)	3–2 GWS (0–2, 0–0, 2–0, 0–0, 1–0)	(Germany) Kölner Haie	Oulun Energia Areena, Oulu; Attendance: 5,012

Game reference

6 September 2014; 17:30	HC Košice (Slovakia)	4–3 (0–1, 3–2, 1–0)	(Czech Republic) Bílí Tygři Liberec	Steel Aréna, Košice; Attendance: 4,144

Game reference

7 September 2014; 17:45	Kölner Haie (Germany)	3–2 (0–2, 1–0, 2–0)	(Finland) Oulun Kärpät	Lanxess Arena, Cologne; Attendance: 4,090

Game reference

24 September 2014; 17:30	Bílí Tygři Liberec (Czech Republic)	2–1 (1–0, 1–1, 0–0)	(Germany) Kölner Haie	Tipsport Arena, Liberec; Attendance: 2,203

Game reference

24 September 2014; 18:30	Oulun Kärpät (Finland)	3–2 OT (1–1, 1–1, 0–0, 1–0)	(Slovakia) HC Košice	Oulun Energia Areena, Oulu; Attendance: 2,674

Game reference

8 October 2014; 17:30	HC Košice (Slovakia)	4-3	(Germany) Kölner Haie	Steel Aréna, Košice; Attendance: 3,847

Game reference

8 October 2014; 18:30	Oulun Kärpät (Finland)	3-1	(Czech Republic) Bílí Tygři Liberec	Oulun Energia Areena, Oulu; Attendance: 3,011

Game reference

=== Group B ===
Pos	Team	Pld	W	OTW	OTL	L	GF	GA	GD	Pts
1	(Austria) Vienna Capitals	6	4	1	1	0	16	9	+7	15
2	(Switzerland) ZSC Lions	6	2	1	2	1	17	16	+1	10
3	(Sweden) Färjestad BK	6	1	3	1	1	15	13	+2	10
4	(Norway) Vålerenga IF	6	0	0	1	5	7	17	−10	1

21 August 2014; 19:30	Vienna Capitals (Austria)	4–1 (3–0, 0–0, 1–1)	(Sweden) Färjestad BK	Albert Schultz Eishalle, Vienna; Attendance: 3,650

Game reference

Matt Zaba
Goalies
Fredrik Pettersson Wentzel
Justin Pogge
Referees:
(Slovakia) Vladimir Baluska
(Austria) Viktor Trilar
Linesmen:
(Austria) Attila Nagy
(Austria) Damir Rakovic

K. Foucault (P. Peter) (PP) - 2:52	1–0
M. Schlacher - 5:42	2–0
A. Naglich (P. Macarthur, J. Fraser) - 10:42	3–0
	3–1	51:12 - P. Aslund (M. Gulas, J. Klepis) (PP)
K. Foucault (H. Jessiman, F. Iberer) (PP) - 58:09	4–1

18 min
Penalties
37 min
17
Shots
25

21 August 2014; 19:45	ZSC Lions (Switzerland)	4–1 (1–1, 1–0, 2–0)	(Norway) Vålerenga IF	Hallenstadion, Zürich; Attendance: 1,917

Game reference

Lukas Flueler
Goalies
Steffen Soeberg
Referees:
(Sweden) Linus Öhlund
(Switzerland) Stephan Eichman
Linesmen:
(Switzerland) Roman Kaderli
(Switzerland) Andreas Kohler

C. Baltisberger (S. Blindenbacher) (PP) - 2:24	1–0
	1–1	17:13 - J. Karterud (D. Braeck)
R. Keller (R. Nilsson, R. Shannon) - 21:52	2–1
M. Bastl (D. Fritsche) - 44:26	3–1
S. Zangger (PP) - 51:22	4–1

8 min
Penalties
22 min
37
Shots
27

23 August 2014; 17:45	Vienna Capitals (Austria)	2–1 (0–0, 1–1, 1–0)	(Norway) Vålerenga IF	Albert Schultz Eishalle, Vienna; Attendance: 3,400

Game reference

23 August 2014; 19:45	ZSC Lions (Switzerland)	2–3 OT (0–1, 1–0, 1–1, 0–1)	(Sweden) Färjestad BK	Hallenstadion, Zürich; Attendance: 3,515

Game reference

4 September 2014; 19:30	Vålerenga IF (Norway)	1–2 (0–0, 1–1, 0–1)	(Austria) Vienna Capitals	Jordal Amfi, Oslo; Attendance: 1,679

Game reference

4 September 2014; 20:05	Färjestad BK (Sweden)	4–3 OT (1–2, 1–0, 1–1, 1–0)	(Switzerland) ZSC Lions	Löfbergs Arena, Karlstad; Attendance: 1,714

Game reference

6 September 2014; 14:30	Vålerenga IF (Norway)	2–3 (0–1, 1–0, 1–2)	(Switzerland) ZSC Lions	Jordal Amfi, Oslo; Attendance: 1,977

Game reference

6 September 2014; 14:35	Färjestad BK (Sweden)	1–2 GWS (0–1, 0–0, 1–0, 0–0, 0–1)	(Austria) Vienna Capitals	Löfbergs Arena, Karlstad; Attendance: 1,972

Game reference

23 September 2014; 19:45	ZSC Lions (Switzerland)	2–1 OT (1–1, 0–0, 0–0, 1–0)	(Austria) Vienna Capitals	Hallenstadion, Zürich; Attendance: 3,314

Game reference

23 September 2014; 20:05	Färjestad BK (Sweden)	4–1 (0–1, 1–0, 3–0)	(Norway) Vålerenga IF	Löfbergs Arena, Karlstad; Attendance: 1,121

Game reference

7 October 2014; 19:30	Vienna Capitals (Austria)	5-3	(Switzerland) ZSC Lions	Albert Schultz Eishalle, Vienna; Attendance: 4,450

Game reference

8 October 2014; 20:05	Vålerenga IF (Norway)	1-2 OT	(Sweden) Färjestad BK	Jordal Amfi, Oslo; Attendance: 2,465

Game reference

=== Group C ===
Pos	Team	Pld	W	OTW	OTL	L	GF	GA	GD	Pts
1	(Sweden) Frölunda HC	6	5	0	0	1	35	13	+22	15
2	(Switzerland) Genève-Servette	6	5	0	0	1	28	15	+13	15
3	(Austria) Villach SV	6	2	0	0	4	11	23	−12	6
4	(France) Briançon Diables Rouges	6	0	0	0	6	8	31	−23	0

21 August 2014; 19:45	Briançon Diables Rouges (France)	1–2 (1–0, 0–0, 0–2)	(Austria) Villach SV	Patinoire René Froger, Briançon; Attendance: 842

Game reference

Shane Madolora
Goalies
Jean-Philippe Lamoureux
Referees:
(Germany) Lars Bruggeman
(France) Geoffrey Barcelo
Linesmen:
(France) Yann Furet
(France) Margry Gwilherm

D. Labrecque (D. Raux, M. Gagnon) (PP) - 4:15	1–0
	1–1	51:56 - J. Lammers (G. Waugh, E. Hunter)
	1–2	57:27 - B. McBride (M. Santorelli, F. Fortier)

12 min
Penalties
18 min
40
Shots
31

21 August 2014; 19:45	Genève-Servette (Switzerland)	4–3 (1–2, 2–0, 1–3)	(Sweden) Frölunda HC	Patinoire des Vernets, Geneva; Attendance: 5,044

Game reference

Christophe Bays
Goalies
Lars Johansson
Referees:
(Czech Republic) Vladimír Šindler
(Switzerland) Didier Massy
Linesmen:
(Switzerland) Michael Tscherrig
(Switzerland) Michael Rohrer

G. Bezina (R. Loeffel) (PP) - 10:54	1–0
R. Gerber (C. Rivera) - 33:12	2–0
J. Mercier (SH) - 39:36	3–0
	3–1	40:27 - E. Falth (M. Olimb, A. Johnsson) (PP)
	3–2	50:31 - C. Backman (A. Johnsson, S. Stalberg)
C. Rivera - 53:34	4–2
	4–3	57:01 - M. Olimb (A. Johnsson)

28 min
Penalties
6 min
20
Shots
35

23 August 2014; 19:45	Briançon Diables Rouges (France)	1–7 (0–0, 1–4, 0–3)	(Sweden) Frölunda HC	Patinoire René Froger, Briançon; Attendance: 937

Game reference

23 August 2014; 19:45	Genève-Servette (Switzerland)	4–2 (0–2, 2–0, 2–0)	(Austria) Villach SV	Patinoire des Vernets, Geneva; Attendance: 4,246

Game reference

4 September 2014; 19:30	Villach SV (Austria)	4–1 (2–0, 2–1, 0–0)	(France) Briançon Diables Rouges	Stadthalle, Villach; Attendance: 3,014

Game reference

4 September 2014; 20:05	Frölunda HC (Sweden)	7–3 (3–0, 3–3, 1–0)	(Switzerland) Genève-Servette	Scandinavium, Gothenburg; Attendance: 4,565

Game reference

6 September 2014; 19:45	Briançon Diables Rouges (France)	2–7 (1–0, 1–4, 0–3)	(Switzerland) Genève-Servette	Patinoire René Froger, Briançon; Attendance: 967

Game reference

7 September 2014; 14:35	Frölunda HC (Sweden)	5–2 (1–1, 2–0, 2–1)	(Austria) Villach SV	Scandinavium, Gothenburg; Attendance: 4,880

Game reference

23 September 2014; 19:30	Villach SV (Austria)	0–5 (0–0, 0–2, 0–3)	(Switzerland) Genève-Servette	Stadthalle, Villach; Attendance: 2,519

Game reference

24 September 2014; 20:05	Frölunda HC (Sweden)	6-2	(France) Briançon Diables Rouges	Scandinavium, Gothenburg; Attendance: 1,391

Game reference

7 October 2014; 19:30	Villach SV (Austria)	1-7	(Sweden) Frölunda HC	Stadthalle, Villach; Attendance: 2,150

Game reference

7 October 2014; 19:45	Genève-Servette (Switzerland)	5-1	(France) Briançon Diables Rouges	Patinoire des Vernets, Geneva; Attendance: 4,277

Game reference

=== Group D ===
Pos	Team	Pld	W	OTW	OTL	L	GF	GA	GD	Pts
1	(Switzerland) Fribourg-Gottéron	6	3	2	1	0	21	13	+8	14
2	(Czech Republic) PSG Zlín	6	2	1	2	1	15	20	−5	10
3	(Sweden) Djurgårdens IF	6	2	1	1	2	21	16	+5	9
4	(Germany) Eisbären Berlin	6	0	1	1	4	14	22	−8	3

21 August 2014; 20:05	Djurgårdens IF (Sweden)	5–4 OT (0–0, 1–3, 3–1, 1–0)	(Switzerland) Fribourg-Gottéron	Hovet, Stockholm; Attendance: 2,652

Game reference

22 August 2014; 19:30	Eisbären Berlin (Germany)	3–4 GWS (1–2, 1–1, 1–0, 0–0, 0–1)	(Czech Republic) PSG Zlín	O2 World, Berlin; Attendance: 6,200

Game reference

23 August 2014; 19:45	Fribourg-Gottéron (Switzerland)	6–3 (0–0, 3–0, 3–3)	(Germany) Eisbären Berlin	BCF Arena, Fribourg; Attendance: 2,780

Game reference

24 August 2014; 17:05	PSG Zlín (Czech Republic)	3–1 (0–0, 2–1, 1–0)	(Sweden) Djurgårdens IF	Zimní stadion Luďka Čajky, Zlín; Attendance: 4,018

Game reference

4 September 2014; 19:45	PSG Zlín (Czech Republic)	2–3 OT (1–1, 0–1, 1–0, 0–1)	(Switzerland) Fribourg-Gottéron	Zimní stadion Luďka Čajky, Zlín; Attendance: 3,912

Game reference

5 September 2014; 14:35	Eisbären Berlin (Germany)	4–3 GWS (1–1, 1–1, 1–1, 0–0, 1–0)	(Sweden) Djurgårdens IF	O2 World, Berlin; Attendance: 5,660

Game reference

6 September 2014; 19:45	Fribourg-Gottéron (Switzerland)	3–2 GWS (1–1, 0–1, 1–0, 0–0, 1–0)	(Czech Republic) PSG Zlín	BCF Arena, Fribourg; Attendance: 2,288

Game reference

7 September 2014; 20:05	Djurgårdens IF (Sweden)	3–2 (0–1, 2–0, 1–1)	(Germany) Eisbären Berlin	Hovet, Stockholm; Attendance: 4,927

Game reference

23 September 2014; 19:30	Eisbären Berlin (Germany)	0–2 (0–1, 0–1, 0–0)	(Switzerland) Fribourg-Gottéron	O2 World, Berlin; Attendance: 4,860

Game reference

23 September 2014; 20:05	Djurgårdens IF (Sweden)	8–0 (1–0, 6–0, 1–0)	(Czech Republic) PSG Zlín	Hovet, Stockholm; Attendance: 871

Game reference

7 October 2014; 19:30	PSG Zlín (Czech Republic)	4-2 (1-0, 0-1, 3-1)	(Germany) Eisbären Berlin	Zimní stadion Luďka Čajky, Zlín; Attendance: 1,118

Game reference

7 October 2014; 19:45	Fribourg-Gottéron (Switzerland)	3-1 (1-1, 0-0, 2-0)	(Sweden) Djurgårdens IF	BCF Arena, Fribourg; Attendance: 3,160

Game reference

=== Group E ===
Pos	Team	Pld	W	OTW	OTL	L	GF	GA	GD	Pts
1	(Finland) Tappara	6	3	0	2	1	21	16	+5	11
2	(Norway) Stavanger Oilers	6	3	1	0	2	19	17	+2	11
3	(Czech Republic) Oceláři Třinec	6	3	0	0	3	20	14	+6	9
4	(Switzerland) SC Bern	6	1	1	0	4	11	24	−13	5

21 August 2014; 17:30	Oceláři Třinec (Czech Republic)	7–0 (2–0, 3–0, 2–0)	(Switzerland) SC Bern	Werk Arena, Třinec; Attendance: 3,723

Game reference

Simon Hrubec
Goalies
Marco Buhrer
Referees:
(Austria) Ladislav Smetana
(Czech Republic) Roman Polák
Linesmen:
(Czech Republic) Jiří Gebauer
(Czech Republic) Vít Lederer

J. Polansky (Z. Irgl, M. Adamsky) - 7:18	1–0
D. Nosek (J. Polansky, Z. Irgl) (PP) - 10:23	2–0
J. Polansky (Z. Irgl, L. Zejdl) (PP) - 20:28	3–0
M. Troncinsky (SH) - 36:25	4–0
T. Linhart (V. Dravecky) - 38:52	5–0
J. Orsava (R. Klesla) - 56:09	6–0
J. Orsava (J. Polansky) - 57:53	7–0

54 min
Penalties
38 min
37
Shots
31

21 August 2014; 18:30	Tappara (Finland)	7–3 (1–3, 4–0, 2–0)	(Norway) Stavanger Oilers	Hakametsa, Tampere; Attendance: 2,563

Game reference

Juha Metsola
Goalies
Ruben Smith
Referees:
(Sweden) Morgan Johansson
(Finland) Aleksi Rantala
Linesmen:
(Finland) Markus Hägerström
(Finland) Sakari Suominen

	0–1	4:05 – J. Soares (C. Dahl-Andersen, N. Plastino)
	0–2	7:21 – D. Rokseth (J. Soares, K. Forsberg)
	0–3	8:00 – J. Soares (C. Dahl-Andersen, K. Forsberg) (PP)
D. Kolomatis (J-M. Jarvinen, O. Palola) (PP) – 12:36	1–3
P. Jormakka (D. Kolomatis, O. Palola) (PP) – 31:01	2–3
P. Jormakka (PS) – 35:09	3–3
– O. Palola (J-M. Jarvinen, D. Kolomatis) (PP) – 35:45	4–3
A. Maikinen (O. Rauhala, P. Saravo) – 37:49	5–3
H. Haapala (E. Kaksonen, D. Kolomatis) (PP) – 45:42	6–3
T. Aalto (A. Erkinjuntti, J. Malinen) (PP) – 57:25	7–3

8 min
Penalties
20 min
33
Shots
17

23 August 2014; 16:00	Tappara (Finland)	3–5 (1–0, 1–4, 1–1)	(Switzerland) SC Bern	Hakametsa, Tampere; Attendance: 3,328

Game reference

23 August 2014; 20:00	Oceláři Třinec (Czech Republic)	4–5 (1–1, 2–3, 1–1)	(Norway) Stavanger Oilers	Werk Arena, Třinec; Attendance: 2,875

Game reference

4 September 2014; 19:45	SC Bern (Switzerland)	0–4 (0–3, 0–1, 0–0)	(Czech Republic) Oceláři Třinec	PostFinance Arena, Bern; Attendance: 4,677

Game reference

4 September 2014; 20:00	Stavanger Oilers (Norway)	2–1 GWS (0–1, 1–0, 0–0, 0–0, 1–0)	(Finland) Tappara	DNB Arena, Stavanger; Attendance: 3,113

Game reference

6 September 2014; 17:00	SC Bern (Switzerland)	4–3 GWS (0–0, 2–0, 1–3, 0–0, 1–0)	(Finland) Tappara	PostFinance Arena, Bern; Attendance: 4,731

Game reference

6 September 2014; 17:30	Stavanger Oilers (Norway)	2–3 (2–2, 0–1, 0–0)	(Czech Republic) Oceláři Třinec	DNB Arena, Stavanger; Attendance: 3,551

Game reference

23 September 2014; 17:30	Oceláři Třinec (Czech Republic)	1–2 (0–0, 0–0, 1–2)	(Finland) Tappara	Werk Arena, Třinec; Attendance: 3,807

Game reference

23 September 2014; 19:45	SC Bern (Switzerland)	0–2 (0–0, 0–0, 0–2)	(Norway) Stavanger Oilers	PostFinance Arena, Bern; Attendance: 4,164

Game reference

7 October 2014; 18:30	Tappara (Finland)	5-1 (2-0, 2-0, 1-1)	(Czech Republic) Oceláři Třinec	Hakametsa, Tampere; Attendance: 2,446

Game reference

7 October 2014; 19:45	Stavanger Oilers (Norway)	5-2 (0-0, 0-2, 5-0)	(Switzerland) SC Bern	DNB Arena, Stavanger; Attendance: 4,034

Game reference

=== Group F ===
Pos	Team	Pld	W	OTW	OTL	L	GF	GA	GD	Pts
1	(Sweden) Linköping HC	6	4	1	0	1	20	10	+10	14
2	(Finland) TPS	6	3	1	1	1	21	12	+9	12
3	(Italy) HC Bolzano	6	3	0	0	3	12	22	−10	9
4	(Czech Republic) HC Pardubice	6	0	0	1	5	11	20	−9	1

22 August 2014; 18:30	TPS (Finland)	9–0 (2–0, 6–0, 1–0)	(Italy) HC Bolzano	HK Areena, Turku; Attendance: 3,226

Game reference

22 August 2014; 20:05	Linköping HC (Sweden)	2–1 (1–0, 0–0, 1–1)	(Czech Republic) HC Pardubice	Saab Arena, Linköping; Attendance: 6,127

Game reference

24 August 2014; 14:35	Linköping HC (Sweden)	5–0 (2–0, 2–0, 1–0)	(Italy) HC Bolzano	Saab Arena, Linköping; Attendance: 3,521

Game reference

24 August 2014; 16:00	TPS (Finland)	2–1 (0–1, 0–0, 2–0)	(Czech Republic) HC Pardubice	HK Areena, Turku; Attendance: 3,389

Game reference

5 September 2014; 17:30	HC Pardubice (Czech Republic)	3–6 (1–4, 2–0, 0–2)	(Sweden) Linköping HC	ČEZ Aréna, Pardubice; Attendance: 1,526

Game reference

5 September 2014; 20:00	HC Bolzano (Italy)	4–2 (2–2, 0–0, 2–0)	(Finland) TPS	Eiswelle, Bolzano; Attendance: 1,360

Game reference

7 September 2014; 17:30	HC Pardubice (Czech Republic)	2–3 GWS (1–2, 1–0, 0–0, 0–0, 0–1)	(Finland) TPS	ČEZ Aréna, Pardubice; Attendance: 1,620

Game reference

7 September 2014; 18:30	HC Bolzano (Italy)	1–2 (0–0, 0–1, 1–1)	(Sweden) Linköping HC	Eiswelle, Bolzano; Attendance: 1,413

Game reference

23 September 2014; 17:30	HC Pardubice (Czech Republic)	1–3 (0–1, 1–1, 0–1)	(Italy) HC Bolzano	ČEZ Aréna, Pardubice; Attendance: 865

Game reference

24 September 2014; 18:30	TPS (Finland)	3–4 GWS (1–1, 1–1, 1–1, 0–0, 0–1)	(Sweden) Linköping HC	HK Areena, Turku; Attendance: 3,648

Game reference

7 October 2014; 19:45	HC Bolzano (Italy)	4-3 (0-1, 1-2, 3-0)	(Czech Republic) HC Pardubice	Eiswelle, Bolzano; Attendance: 1,413

Game reference

7 October 2014; 20:05	Linköping HC (Sweden)	1-2 (0-1, 1-1, 0-0)	(Finland) TPS	Saab Arena, Linköping; Attendance: 1,783

Game reference

=== Group G ===
Pos	Team	Pld	W	OTW	OTL	L	GF	GA	GD	Pts
1	(Czech Republic) HC Sparta Praha	6	3	1	1	1	25	19	+6	12
2	(Sweden) Växjö Lakers	6	4	0	0	2	19	14	+5	12
3	(Finland) KalPa	6	2	0	1	3	11	15	−4	7
4	(Germany) Adler Mannheim	6	1	1	0	4	11	18	−7	5

21 August 2014; 18:30	KalPa (Finland)	4–5 GWS (2–0, 1–2, 1–2, 0–0, 0–1)	(Czech Republic) Sparta Prague	Kuopio Ice Hall, Kuopio; Attendance: 2,246

Game reference

Eero Kilpelainen
Goalies
Rastislav Stana
Referees:
(Sweden) Patrik Sjöberg
(Finland) Timo Metsälä
Linesmen:
(Finland) Samuli Orava
(Finland) Harri Perämäki

J. Junnila (H. Liedes, J. Harjama) - 12:16	1–0
J. Riikola (A. Ilomaki, M. Birner) (PP) - 17:58	2–0
	2–1	20:07 - R. Sabolic
	2–2	23:35 - L. Cingel (J. Hlinka, R. Sabolic) (PP)
S. Mutanen (J. Riikola) - 37:45	3–2
	3–3	55:08 - J. Buchtele (M. Reway)
M. Birner (T. Kubalik, A. Ilomaki) - 57:40	4–3
	4–4	58:33 - J. Buchtele (M. Reway)

T. Kubalik (miss)
M. Birner
J. Voutilainen
A. Ilomaki (miss)
J. Keranen (miss)
Shootout
L. Pech
M. Reway
(miss) J. Buchtele
(miss) L. Cingel
R. Sabolic
10 min
Penalties
10 min
25
Shots
32

21 August 2014; 20:05	Växjö Lakers (Sweden)	6–1 (1–0, 1–1, 4–0)	(Germany) Adler Mannheim	Vida Arena, Växjö; Attendance: 2,903

Game reference

24 August 2014; 16:00	KalPa (Finland)	1–0 (1–0, 0–0, 0–0)	(Germany) Adler Mannheim	Kuopio Ice Hall, Kuopio; Attendance: 2,799

Game reference

24 August 2014; 16:00	Växjö Lakers (Sweden)	2–5 (1–1, 0–2, 1–2)	(Czech Republic) Sparta Prague	Vida Arena, Växjö; Attendance: 3,446

Game reference

4 September 2014; 19:30	Adler Mannheim (Germany)	3–1 (1–0, 0–0, 2–1)	(Finland) KalPa	SAP Arena, Mannheim; Attendance: 5,173

Game reference

4 September 2014; 20:05	Sparta Prague (Czech Republic)	5–4 (0–0, 3–1, 2–3)	(Sweden) Växjö Lakers	O2 Arena, Prague; Attendance: 1,983

Game reference

6 September 2014; 14:35	Adler Mannheim (Germany)	1–2 (1–0, 0–1, 0–1)	(Sweden) Växjö Lakers	SAP Arena, Mannheim; Attendance: 5,326

Game reference

6 September 2014; 20:00	Sparta Prague (Czech Republic)	2–3 (1–1, 1–2, 0–0)	(Finland) KalPa	O2 Arena, Prague; Attendance: 2,038

Game reference

23 September 2014; 19:30	Adler Mannheim (Germany)	3–2 OT (1–0, 0–1, 1–1, 1–0)	(Czech Republic) Sparta Prague	SAP Arena, Mannheim; Attendance: 5,466

Game reference

24 September 2014; 20:05	Växjö Lakers (Sweden)	2-1 (1-0, 1-0, 0-1)	(Finland) KalPa	Vida Arena, Växjö; Attendance: 2,327

Game reference

7 October 2014; 18:30	KalPa (Finland)	1-3 (0-3, 1-0, 0-0)	(Sweden) Växjö Lakers	Kuopio Ice Hall, Kuopio; Attendance: 2,646

Game reference

8 October 2014; 20:00	Sparta Prague (Czech Republic)	6-3 (1-1, 2-1, 3-1)	(Germany) Adler Mannheim	O2 Arena, Prague; Attendance: 2,448

Game reference

=== Group H ===
Pos	Team	Pld	W	OTW	OTL	L	GF	GA	GD	Pts
1	(Finland) SaiPa	6	4	1	0	1	18	11	+7	14
2	(Switzerland) EV Zug	6	3	0	1	2	14	14	0	10
3	(Czech Republic) Vítkovice Steel	6	1	1	1	3	18	20	−2	6
4	(Germany) ERC Ingolstadt	6	1	1	1	3	16	21	−5	6

21 August 2014; 17:00	Vítkovice Steel (Czech Republic)	5–1 (0–0, 2–1, 3–0)	(Germany) ERC Ingolstadt	ČEZ Aréna, Ostrava; Attendance: 3,398

Game reference

Filip Sindelar
Goalies
Timo Pielmeier
Referees:
(Slovakia) Daniel Konc
(Czech Republic) Robni Šir
Linesmen:
(Czech Republic) Tomáš Brejcha
(Czech Republic) Libor Suchánek

P. Zdrahal (P. Huzevka, J. Burger) (PP) - 27:52	1–0
P. Huzevka (R. Stehlik, P. Zdrahal) (PP) - 28:46	2–0
	2–1	33:25 - M. Schmidpetter (B. Barta)
R. Stehlik (O. Sedivy, J. Burger) (PP) - 48:03	3–1
J. Kana (L. Kovar, P. Strapac) - 50:55	4–1
P. Zdrahal (L. Kucsera, J. Stencel) - 54:16	5–1

6 min
Penalties
22 min
30
Shots
25

21 August 2014; 19:45	EV Zug (Switzerland)	1–2 (1–1, 0–1, 0–0)	(Finland) SaiPa	Bossard Arena, Zug; Attendance: 2,818

Game reference

Tobias Stephan
Goalies
Jussi Markkanen
Referees:
(Sweden) Mikael Nord
(Switzerland) Marcus Vinnerborg
Linesmen:
(Switzerland) Peter Kung
(Switzerland) Roger Burgi

	0–1	11:42 - D. McIntyre (D. Spina, S. Lofquist) (PP)
R. Earl (D. Sondell, R. Suri) (PP) - 15:26	1–1
	1–2	25:21 - S. Venalainen (S. Backman, M. Flinck

12 min
Penalties
12 min
23
Shots
21

23 August 2014; 17:00	Vítkovice Steel (Czech Republic)	2–5 (0–0, 0–2, 2–3)	(Switzerland) EV Zug	ČEZ Aréna, Ostrava; Attendance: 3,186

Game reference

23 August 2014; 17:45	ERC Ingolstadt (Germany)	4–1 (1–0, 2–1, 1–0)	(Finland) SaiPa	Saturn Arena, Ingolstadt; Attendance: 1,566

Game reference

4 September 2014; 18:30	SaiPa (Finland)	4–3 GWS (0–0, 1–2, 2–1, 0–0, 1–0)	(Czech Republic) Vítkovice Steel	Kisapuisto, Lappeenranta; Attendance: 3,050

Game reference

4 September 2014; 19:45	EV Zug (Switzerland)	3–2 (2–1, 1–0, 0–1)	(Germany) ERC Ingolstadt	Bossard Arena, Zug; Attendance: 2,607

Game reference

6 September 2014; 16:00	SaiPa (Finland)	5–2 (2–1, 2–1, 1–0)	(Germany) ERC Ingolstadt	Kisapuisto, Lappeenranta; Attendance: 3,068

Game reference

6 September 2014; 19:45	EV Zug (Switzerland)	3–2 (2–0, 0–1, 1–1)	(Czech Republic) Vítkovice Steel	Bossard Arena, Zug; Attendance: 3,256

Game reference

23 September 2014; 18:30	SaiPa (Finland)	3–0 (2–0, 1–0, 0–0)	(Switzerland) EV Zug	Kisapuisto, Lappeenranta; Attendance: 3,044

Game reference

23 September 2014; 19:30	ERC Ingolstadt (Germany)	4–5 GWS (0–2, 2–1, 2–1, 0–0, 0–1)	(Czech Republic) Vítkovice Steel	Saturn Arena, Ingolstadt; Attendance: 1,146

Game reference

7 October 2014; 17:00	Vítkovice Steel (Czech Republic)	1-3 (0-0, 1-0, 0-3)	(Finland) SaiPa	ČEZ Aréna, Ostrava; Attendance: 3,102

Game reference

7 October 2014; 19:30	ERC Ingolstadt (Germany)	3-2 OT (0-0, 2-0, 0-2, 1-0)	(Switzerland) EV Zug	Saturn Arena, Ingolstadt; Attendance: 954

Game reference

=== Group I ===
Pos	Team	Pld	W	OTW	OTL	L	GF	GA	GD	Pts
1	(Austria) Red Bull Salzburg	6	5	0	0	1	23	8	+15	15
2	(Finland) JYP	6	3	2	0	1	15	11	+4	13
3	(Sweden) HV71	6	2	0	1	3	15	17	−2	7
4	(Switzerland) Kloten Flyers	6	0	0	1	5	5	22	−17	1

22 August 2014; 18:30	JYP (Finland)	3–2 (2–0, 1–1, 0–1)	(Austria) Red Bull Salzburg	Synergia-areena, Jyväskylä; Attendance: 1,971

Game reference

22 August 2014; 20:05	HV71 (Sweden)	3–2 (1–0, 1–1, 1–1)	(Switzerland) Kloten Flyers	Kinnarps Arena, Jönköping; Attendance: 2,873

Game reference

24 August 2014; 14:35	HV71 (Sweden)	3–5 (1–1, 0–1, 2–3)	(Austria) Red Bull Salzburg	Kinnarps Arena, Jönköping; Attendance: 3,243

Game reference

24 August 2014; 16:00	JYP (Finland)	2–0 (1–0, 1–0, 0–0)	(Switzerland) Kloten Flyers	Synergia-areena, Jyväskylä; Attendance: 1,838

Game reference

5 September 2014; 19:30	Red Bull Salzburg (Austria)	4–0 (1–0, 1–0, 2–0)	(Finland) JYP	Eisarena Salzburg, Salzburg; Attendance: 2,100

Game reference

5 September 2014; 19:45	Kloten Flyers (Switzerland)	0–5 (0–2, 0–2, 0–1)	(Sweden) HV71	Kolping Arena, Kloten; Attendance: 1,355

Game reference

7 September 2014; 15:45	Kloten Flyers (Switzerland)	2–3 OT (2–0, 0–1, 0–1, 0–1)	(Finland) JYP	Kolping Arena, Kloten; Attendance: 951

Game reference

7 September 2014; 17:45	Red Bull Salzburg (Austria)	3–1 (1–0, 0–1, 2–0)	(Sweden) HV71	Eisarena Salzburg, Salzburg; Attendance: 2,416

Game reference

23 September 2014; 18:30	JYP (Finland)	4–3 GWS (2–0, 0–2, 1–1, 0–0, 1–0)	(Sweden) HV71	Synergia-areena, Jyväskylä; Attendance: 1,910

Game reference

23 September 2014; 19:45	Kloten Flyers (Switzerland)	0–2 (0–0, 0–0, 0–2)	(Austria) Red Bull Salzburg	Kolping Arena, Kloten; Attendance: 1,117

Game reference

7 October 2014; 19:30	Red Bull Salzburg (Austria)	7-1 (3-1, 2-0, 2-0)	(Switzerland) Kloten Flyers	Eisarena Salzburg, Salzburg; Attendance: 1,860

Game reference

7 October 2014; 20:05	HV71 (Sweden)	0-3 (0-0,0-3, 0-0)	(Finland) JYP	Kinnarps Arena, Jönköping; Attendance: 1,033

Game reference

=== Group J ===
Pos	Team	Pld	W	OTW	OTL	L	GF	GA	GD	Pts
1	(Sweden) Skellefteå AIK	6	5	0	0	1	20	8	+12	15
2	(Finland) HIFK	6	4	1	0	1	31	15	+16	14
3	(Denmark) SønderjyskE	6	1	0	1	4	15	31	−16	4
4	(Germany) Krefeld Pinguine	6	1	0	0	5	13	25	−12	3

21 August 2014; 19:30	Krefeld Pinguine (Germany)	1–2 (1–0, 0–1, 0–1)	(Sweden) Skellefteå AIK	König Palast, Krefeld; Attendance: 3,307

Game reference

Tomas Duba
Goalies
Erik Hanses
Referees:
(Finland) Petri Lindqvist
(Germany) Daniel Piechaczek
Linesmen:
(Germany) Andreas Kowert
(Germany) Andre Schrader

H. Vasiļjevs (I. Sofron, A. Driendl) (PP) - 7:58	1–0
	1–1	21:20 - E. Forssell (M. Sevc)
	1–2	49:08 - E. Andersson (J. Norman, M. Lundberg)

26 min
Penalties
26 min
21
Shots
45

21 August 2014; 20:00	SønderjyskE (Denmark)	4–5 GWS (3–0, 1–2, 0–2, 0–0, 0–1)	(Finland) HIFK	SE Arena, Vojens; Attendance: 1,826

Game reference

23 August 2014; 17:05	SønderjyskE (Denmark)	1–4 (0–2, 0–1, 1–1)	(Sweden) Skellefteå AIK	SE Arena, Vojens; Attendance: 1,818

Game reference

23 August 2014; 17:45	Krefeld Pinguine (Germany)	3–5 (1–0, 1–1, 1–4)	(Finland) HIFK	König Palast, Krefeld; Attendance: 3,805

Game reference

4 September 2014; 18:30	HIFK (Finland)	6–1 (2–0, 2–1, 2–0)	(Germany) Krefeld Pinguine	Helsinki Ice Hall, Helsinki; Attendance: 3,823

Game reference

4 September 2014; 20:05	Skellefteå AIK (Sweden)	4–1 (1–0, 1–1, 2–0)	(Denmark) SønderjyskE	Skellefteå Kraft Arena, Skellefteå; Attendance: 3,020

Game reference

6 September 2014; 14:35	Skellefteå AIK (Sweden)	4–0 (2–0, 1–0, 1–0)	(Germany) Krefeld Pinguine	Skellefteå Kraft Arena, Skellefteå; Attendance: 3,004

Game reference

6 September 2014; 16:00	HIFK (Finland)	10–1 (4–0, 4–1, 2–0)	(Denmark) SønderjyskE	Helsinki Ice Hall, Helsinki; Attendance: 3,105

Game reference

24 September 2014; 19:30	Krefeld Pinguine (Germany)	3-4 (2-1, 0-0, 1-3)	(Denmark) SønderjyskE	König Palast, Krefeld; Attendance: 2,024

Game reference

24 September 2014; 20:05	Skellefteå AIK (Sweden)	3-0 (0-0, 2-0, 1-0)	(Finland) HIFK	Skellefteå Kraft Arena, Skellefteå; Attendance: 2,812

Game reference

7 October 2014; 18:30	HIFK (Finland)	5-3 (2-1, 1-0, 2-2)	(Sweden) Skellefteå AIK	Helsinki Ice Hall, Helsinki; Attendance: 3,083

Game reference

7 October 2014; 19:30	SønderjyskE (Denmark)	4-5 (0-2, 3-1, 1-2)	(Germany) Krefeld Pinguine	SE Arena, Vojens; Attendance: 2,021

Game reference

=== Group K ===
Pos	Team	Pld	W	OTW	OTL	L	GF	GA	GD	Pts
1	(Finland) Lukko	6	5	0	0	1	21	7	+14	15
2	(Sweden) Luleå HF	6	5	0	0	1	32	6	+26	15
3	(Germany) Hamburg Freezers	6	1	0	0	5	8	21	−13	3
4	(United Kingdom) Nottingham Panthers	6	1	0	0	5	9	36	−27	3

22 August 2014; 19:00	Nottingham Panthers (United Kingdom)	2–4 (0–2, 2–0, 0–2)	(Finland) Lukko	National Ice Centre, Nottingham; Attendance: 4,045

Game reference

22 August 2014; 19:30	Hamburg Freezers (Germany)	1–4 (0–4, 1–0, 0–0)	(Sweden) Luleå Hockey	O2 World, Hamburg; Attendance: 5,580

Game reference

24 August 2014; 13:35	Nottingham Panthers (United Kingdom)	1–10 (1–2, 0–6, 0–2)	(Sweden) Luleå Hockey	National Ice Centre, Nottingham; Attendance: 4,004

Game reference

24 August 2014; 17:45	Hamburg Freezers (Germany)	0–3 (0–0, 0–1, 0–2)	(Finland) Lukko	O2 World, Hamburg; Attendance: 5,437

Game reference

5 September 2014; 18:30	Lukko (Finland)	6–2 (4–0, 1–1, 1–1)	(United Kingdom) Nottingham Panthers	Kivikylän Areena, Rauma; Attendance: 3,072

Game reference

5 September 2014; 20:05	Luleå Hockey (Sweden)	6–0 (1–0, 2–0, 3–0)	(Germany) Hamburg Freezers	Coop Norrbotten Arena, Luleå; Attendance: 2,888

Game reference

7 September 2014; 14:35	Luleå Hockey (Sweden)	9–1 (4–0, 3–0, 2–1)	(United Kingdom) Nottingham Panthers	Coop Norrbotten Arena, Luleå; Attendance: 3,088

Game reference

7 September 2014; 16:00	Lukko (Finland)	5–0 (0–0, 3–0, 2–0)	(Germany) Hamburg Freezers	Kivikylän Areena, Rauma; Attendance: 2,759

Game reference

23 September 2014; 19:30	Nottingham Panthers (United Kingdom)	3–1 (1–1, 1–0, 1–0)	(Germany) Hamburg Freezers	National Ice Centre, Nottingham; Attendance: 3,441

Game reference

23 September 2014; 20:05	Luleå Hockey (Sweden)	3–1 (0–0, 1–1, 2–0)	(Finland) Lukko	Coop Norrbotten Arena, Luleå; Attendance: 2,646

Game reference

7 October 2014; 18:30	Lukko (Finland)	2-0 (0-0, 2-0, 0-0)	(Sweden) Luleå Hockey	Kivikylän Areena, Rauma; Attendance: 2,514

Game reference

7 October 2014; 19:30	Hamburg Freezers (Germany)	6-0 (1-0, 5-0, 0-0)	(United Kingdom) Nottingham Panthers	O2 World, Hamburg; Attendance: 4,210

Game reference

== Ranking of second-placed teams ==
The five best runners-ups from the group stage were determined by the following parameters in this order:

1. Points
2. Goal difference
3. Goals scored
4. Final position in last year's national championship
5. CHL Club Ranking (same as used in group stage seeding)

Grp	Team	Pld	W	OTW	OTL	L	GF	GA	GD	Pts
K	(Sweden) Luleå HF	6	5	0	0	1	32	6	+26	15
C	(Switzerland) Genève-Servette	6	5	0	0	1	28	15	+13	15
J	(Finland) HIFK	6	4	1	0	1	31	15	+16	14
I	(Finland) JYP	6	3	2	0	1	15	11	+4	13
F	(Finland) TPS	6	3	1	1	1	21	12	+9	12
G	(Sweden) Växjö Lakers	6	4	0	0	2	19	14	+5	12
E	(Norway) Stavanger Oilers	6	3	1	0	2	19	17	+2	11
B	(Switzerland) ZSC Lions	6	2	1	2	1	17	16	+1	10
H	(Switzerland) EV Zug	6	3	0	1	2	14	14	0	10
D	(Czech Republic) PSG Zlín	6	2	1	2	1	15	20	−5	10
A	(Czech Republic) Bílí Tygři Liberec	6	3	0	0	3	16	15	+1	9
