= Oulun Energia Areena =

Ice sport venue in Oulu, Finland

- Oulun jäähalli
- 'Oulu Ice Hall' or 'Oulu Ice Rink'
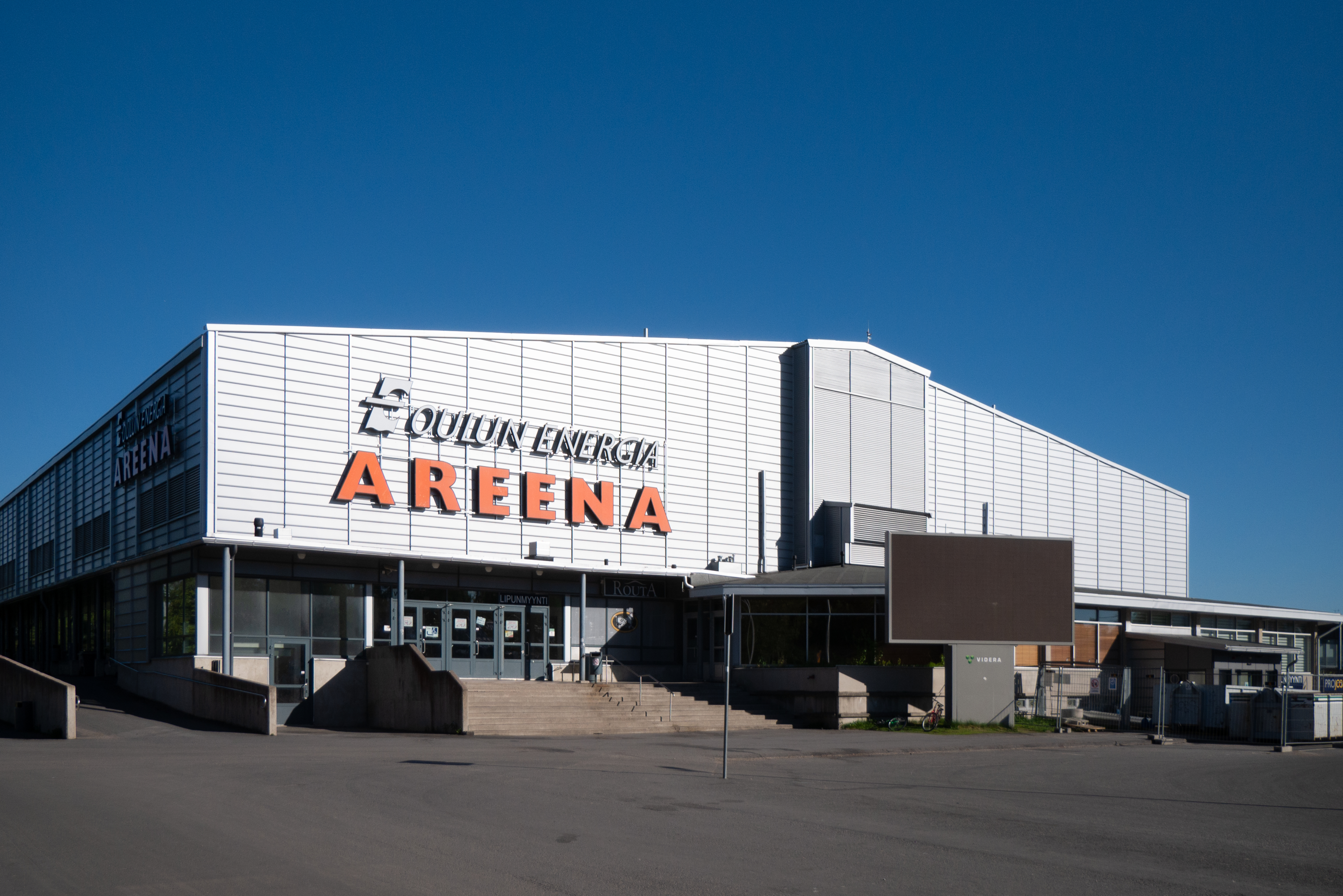
- Oulun Energia Areena in 2018.
- Interactive map of Oulun Energia Areena
- Former names: Raksilan jäähalli (1975–2006)
- Address: Teuvo Pakkalan katu 11; 90100 Oulu; Finland
- Location: Raksila Sports Centre
- Coordinates: 65°00′30″N 025°29′42″E
- Operator: City of Oulu
- Capacity: 7,600 (1975–2003); 7,485 (2003–2004); 6,614 (2004–2018); 6,485 (2018– )
- Events: Sporting events, concerts
- Surface: Concrete, ice
- Field size: 30 m × 90 m (98 ft × 295 ft)

Construction
- Groundbreaking: 1974
- Opened: 1975
- Renovated: 1988, 1994, 2003–04, 2018
- Cost: 10 million mk

Tenants
- Oulun Kärpät (ice hockey); Oulun Kärpät Naiset (ice hockey); Oulun Luistelukerho (figure skating); RB-Oulu (rink bandy)

Oulu Ice Hall (Finnish: Oulun jäähalli), previously known as Raksilan jäähalli and called Oulun Energia Areena since 2006 for sponsorship reasons, is an ice sport arena in the Raksila Sports Centre, located in the Raksila district of Oulu, Finland. It is operated by the City of Oulu. The arena is best known as an ice hockey venue and the home of Liiga team Oulun Kärpät.

== History ==
Construction of the Oulu Ice Hall began in 1974 and the venue was opened in 1975 under the name Raksilan jäähalli ('Raksila Ice Hall'). The arena has gone through several updates and renovations, first in 1988 and again in 1994. A significant renovation was undertaken during 2003–04, which decreased the spectator capacity from the original 7,600 to 6,614. A new rinkside restaurant was opened in the hall in 2018, which further decreased the spectator capacity. As of 2021, the arena has a capacity of 6,614 spectators, of which 4,760 are seated and 1,854 are standing.

In 2006, the principal tenant of the hall, Oulun Kärpät, secured a sponsorship deal with Oulun Energia, an energy company based in Oulu, and the name of the ice hall was changed to Oulun Energia Areena. The sponsorship was made possible by a 2003 decision of the City of Oulu which allowed the primary tenant of a municipal sports venue to sell the name of the venue, if they so chose.

== Tenants ==
The arena is best known as an ice hockey venue and is home to the Liiga team Oulun Kärpät, in addition to the Oulun Kärpät teams in the U20 SM-sarja and U18 SM-sarja. Other tenants include the figure skating club Oulun Luistelukerho and the rink bandy team RB-Oulu. Energia Areena is the official home of Oulun Kärpät 46's representative women's ice hockey team, Oulun Kärpät Naiset of the Naisten Liiga, however the team plays almost exclusively out of Raksila 2.

Energia Areena was home to Kiekko-Laser of the Mestis until the club went bankrupt in 2011.

== Raksila 2 ==
The Raksilan harjoitusjäähalli ('Raksila training ice rink'), also known as Raksila 2, was constructed alongside Energia Areena during 2007–08 and opened on 6 February 2008. Raksila 2 has a spectator capacity of 150 and its ice surface measures 28 m (92 ft) x 58 m (190 ft). The ice hockey club Oulun Kärpät 46 ry is the primary tenant, though the rink is used by a number of ice hockey and figure skating clubs as well as schools and educational institutions in the Oulu area.

== Gallery ==
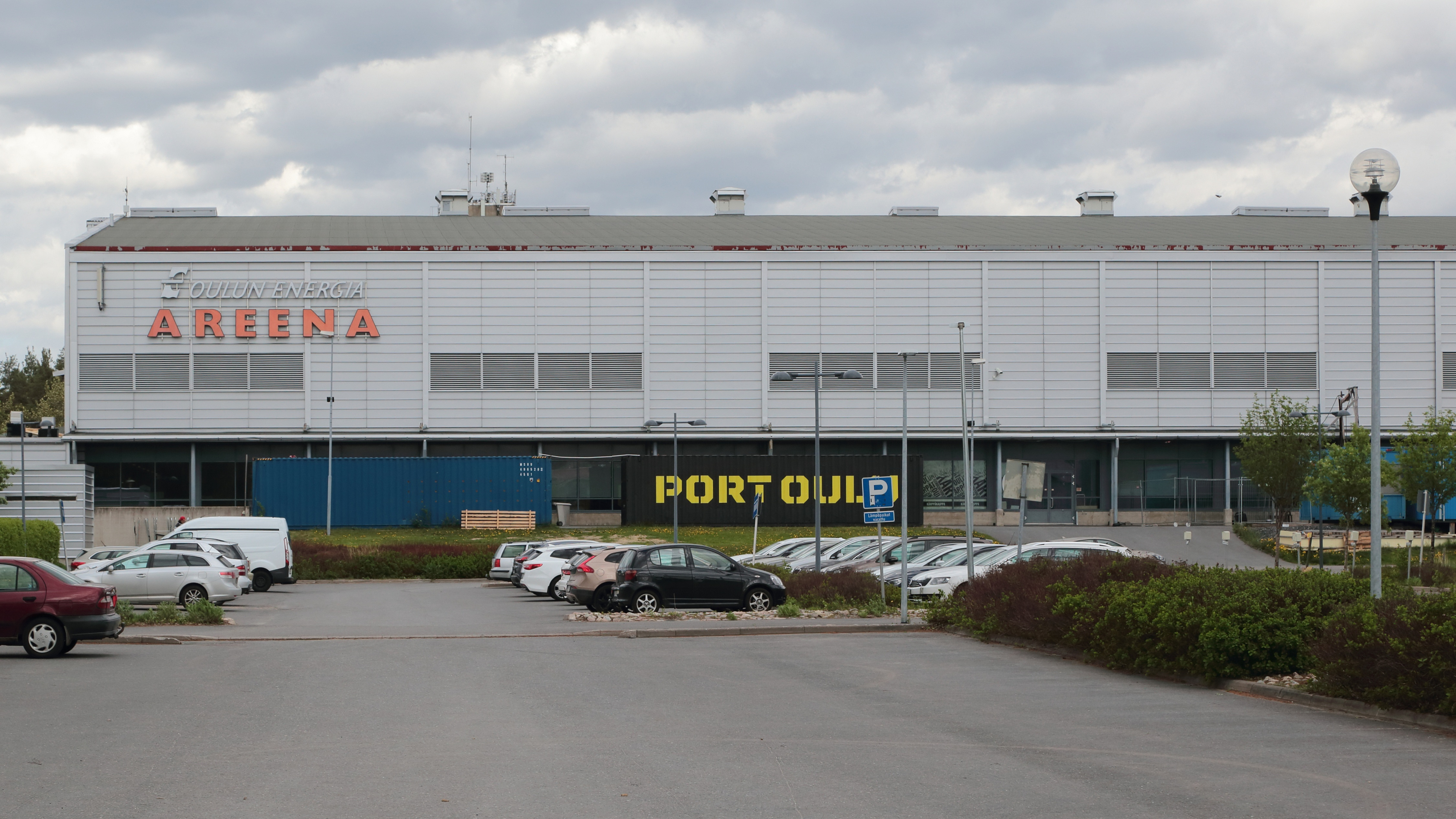
Exterior side view of Oulun Energia Areena in June 2020.

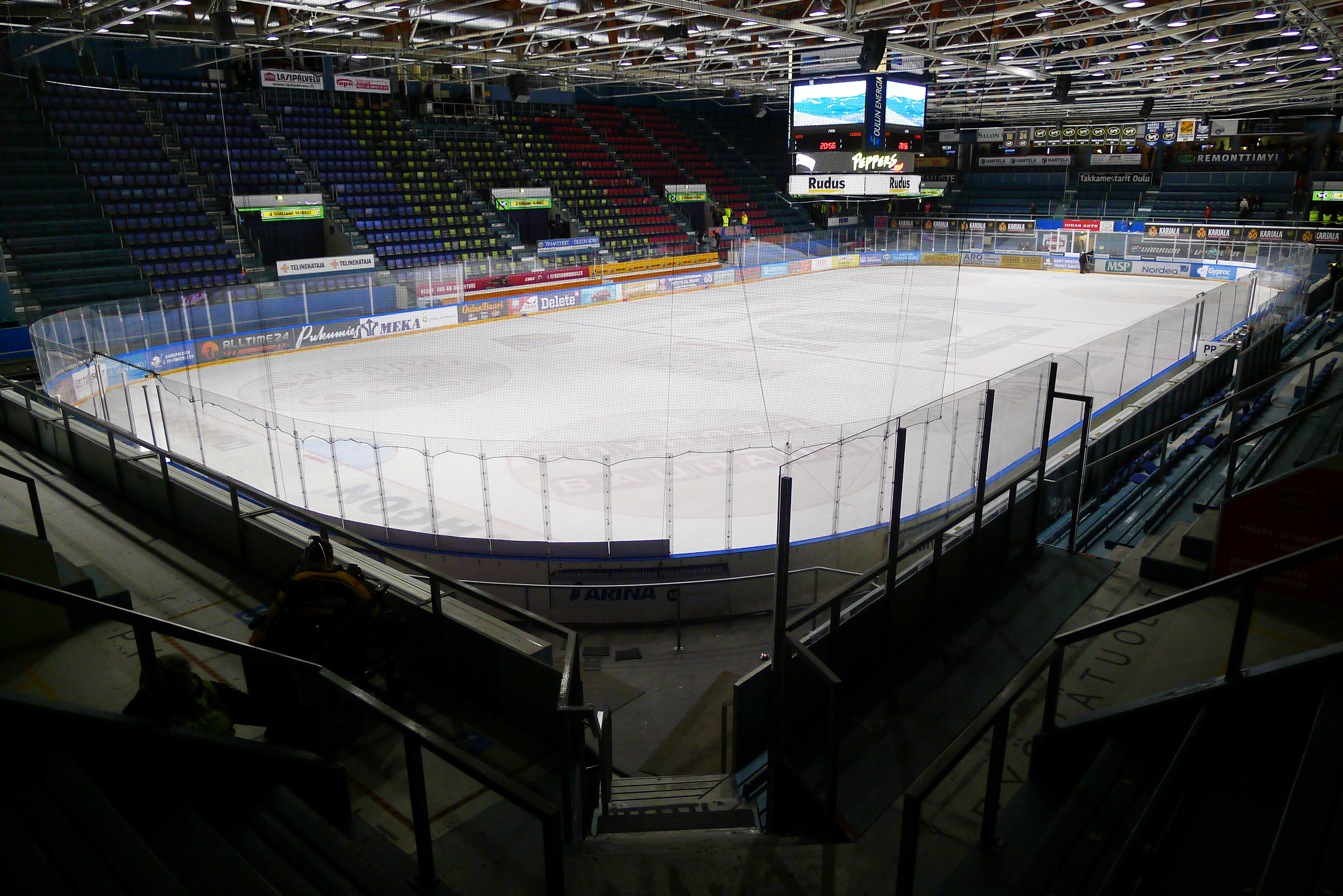
Interior view of the arena in 2016.

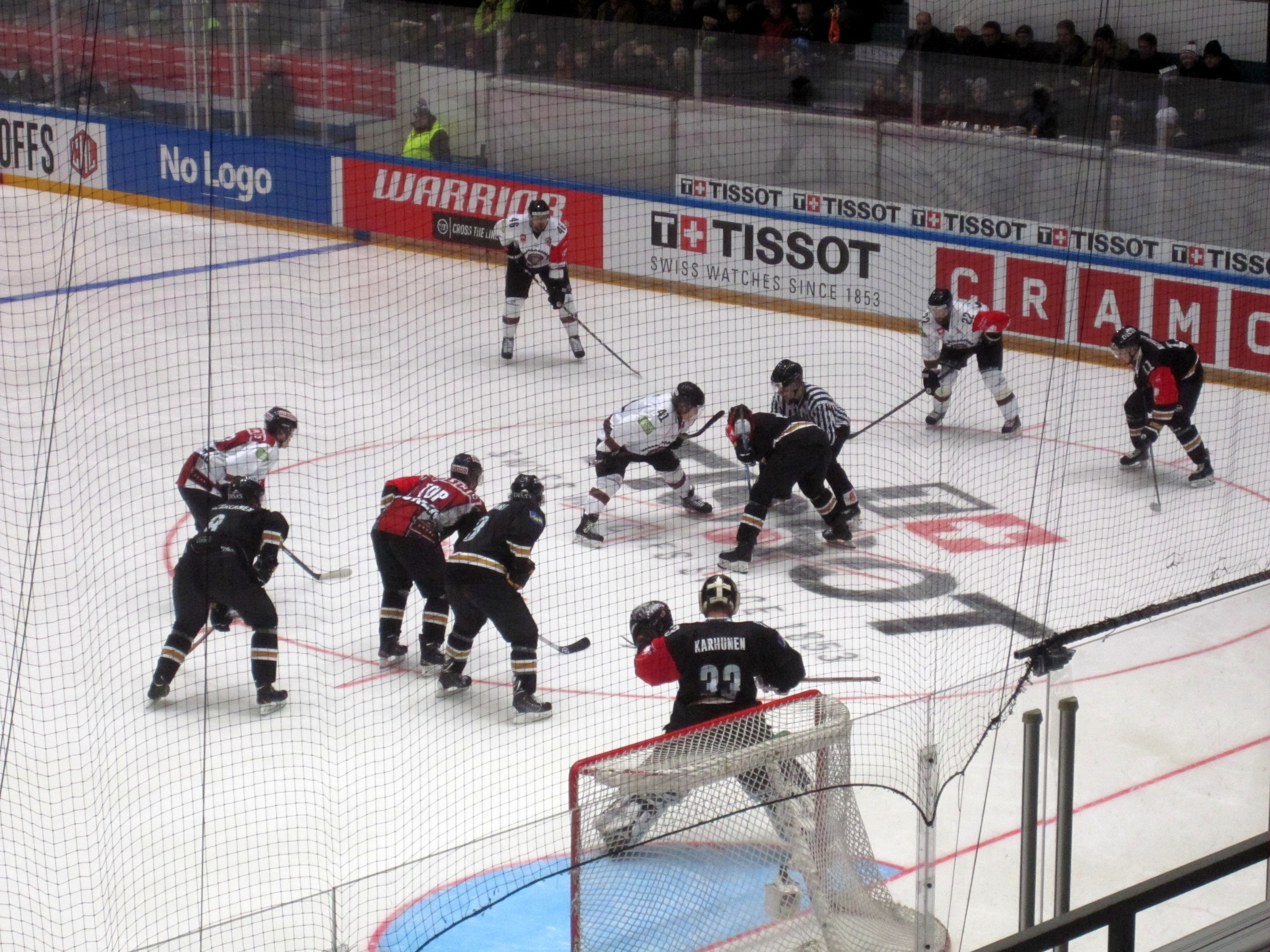
Kärpät (black) face off against Frölunda (white) at Energia Areena during the 2015 CHL Playoffs semifinal.

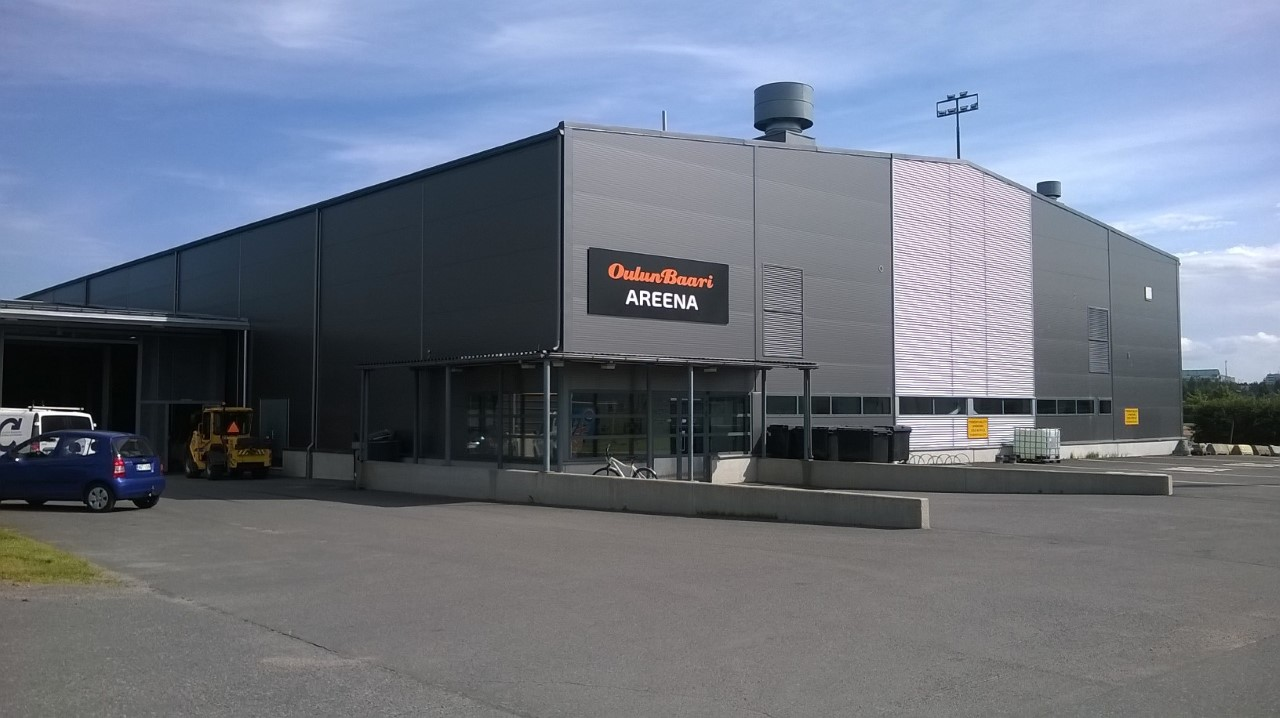
Exterior of Raksila 2 in 2016.

== See also ==
- List of indoor arenas in Finland
- List of indoor arenas in Nordic countries
