= Joona Harjama =

Finnish ice hockey player

- Born: 5 July 1993 (age 31); Hamina, Finland
- Height: 6 ft 0 in (183 cm)
- Weight: 183 lb (83 kg; 13 st 1 lb)
- Position: Centre
- Shot: Left
- Played for: KalPa; SaPKo; Kiekko-Vantaa; Näädät
- Playing career: 2012–2021

Joona Harjama (born 5 July 1993) is a Finnish professional ice hockey center who is currently playing with KalPa in the Finnish Liiga.

Harjama made his SM-liiga debut playing with KalPa during the 2012–13 season.

== Career statistics ==
			Regular season					Playoffs
Season	Team	League	GP	G	A	Pts	PIM	GP	G	A	Pts	PIM
2007–08	HKKJ U17	U17 SM-sarja	1	0	1	1	0	—	—	—	—	—
2008–09	SaiPa U18	U18 I-Divisioona	7	6	10	16	6	—	—	—	—	—
2008–09	SaiPa U20	U20 SM-liiga	6	0	0	0	2	—	—	—	—	—
2009–10	SaiPa U18	U18 SM-sarja	15	3	10	13	32	—	—	—	—	—
2009–10	SaiPa U20	U20 SM-liiga	1	0	0	0	0	—	—	—	—	—
2010–11	SaiPa U18	U18 SM-sarja Q	8	5	7	12	4	—	—	—	—	—
2010–11	SaiPa U18	U18 I-Divisioona	4	1	4	5	27	—	—	—	—	—
2010–11	SaiPa U20	U20 SM-liiga	33	5	9	14	32	—	—	—	—	—
2011–12	KalPa U20	U20 SM-liiga	41	14	14	28	47	9	2	5	7	2
2012–13	KalPa U20	U20 SM-liiga	37	12	24	36	26	3	1	2	3	4
2012–13	KalPa	SM-liiga	13	0	1	1	0	—	—	—	—	—
2012–13	SaPKo	Mestis	3	0	1	1	4	—	—	—	—	—
2013–14	KalPa U20	U20 SM-liiga	10	4	7	11	6	—	—	—	—	—
2013–14	KalPa	Liiga	27	2	2	4	12	—	—	—	—	—
2014–15	KalPa U20	U20 SM-liiga	9	2	4	6	10	—	—	—	—	—
2014–15	KalPa	Liiga	37	0	5	5	10	2	0	0	0	0
2015–16	KalPa	Liiga	55	2	2	4	16	3	0	0	0	0
2016–17	Kiekko-Vantaa	Mestis	49	8	17	25	14	13	2	4	6	6
2017–18	Kiekko-Vantaa	Mestis	50	5	21	26	34	5	0	1	1	0
2018–19	Kiekko-Vantaa	Mestis	50	5	17	22	26	—	—	—	—	—
2019–20	Näädät	III-Divisioona	21	17	33	50	6	2	1	2	3	4
2020–21	Näädät	III-Divisioona	6	2	6	8	0	—	—	—	—	—
Liiga totals			132	4	10	14	38	5	0	0	0	0
Mestis totals			152	18	56	74	78	18	2	5	7	6
