= Jonathan Mercier =

Swiss ice hockey player

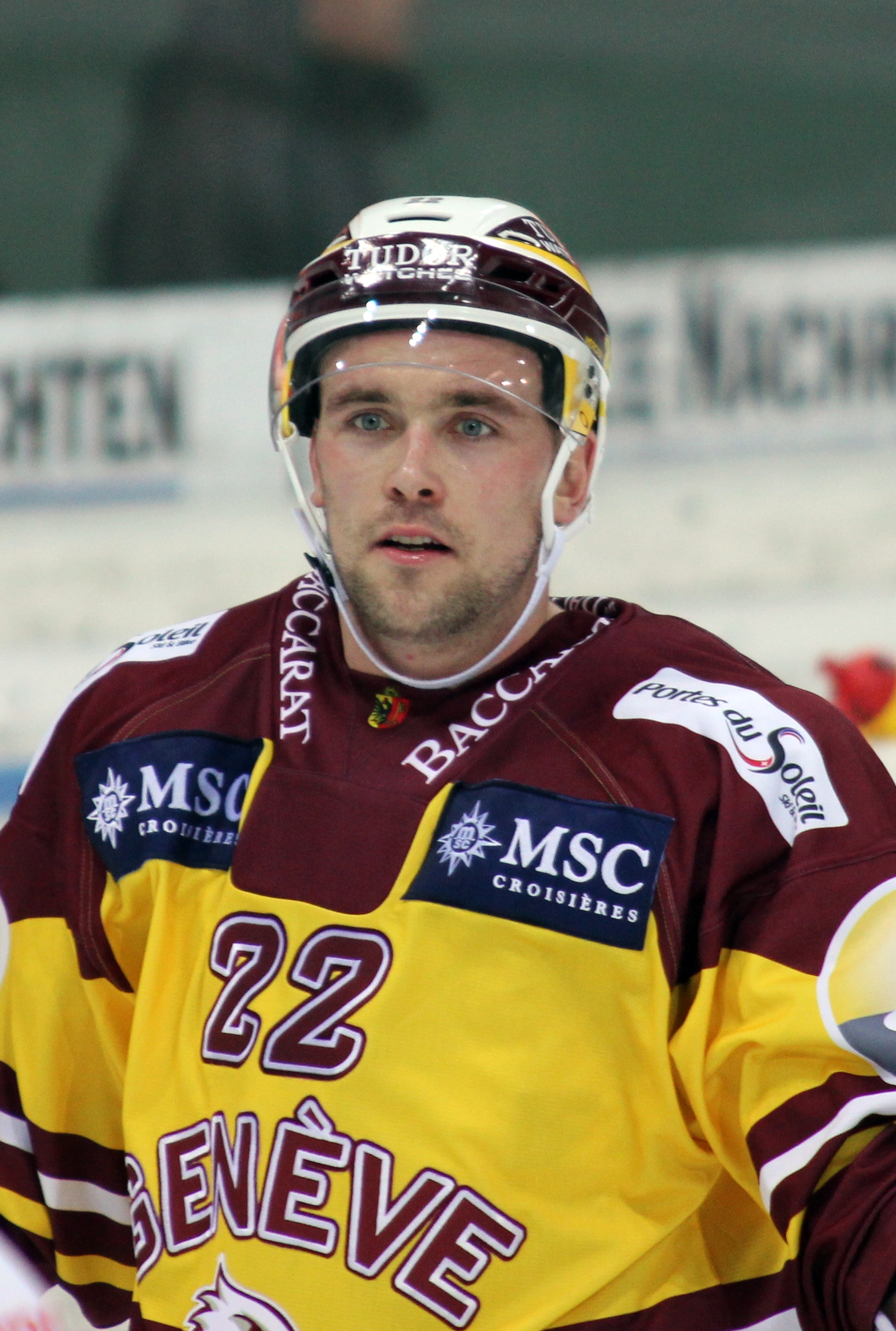
- Born: February 18, 1986 (age 39); Geneva, Switzerland
- Height: 6 ft 2 in (188 cm)
- Weight: 195 lb (88 kg; 13 st 13 lb)
- Position: Defence
- Shot: Left
- Played for: Genève-Servette HC
- Playing career: 2004–2022

Jonathan Mercier (born February 18, 1986) is a Swiss former professional ice hockey defenceman who spent all of his career with Genève-Servette HC of the National League (NL).

== Playing career ==
Mercier made his National League debut playing with Genève-Servette HC during the 2003–04 NL season.

On January 20, 2014, Mercier was signed to a three-year contract extension by Genève-Servette. Mercier won the 2014 and 2015 Spengler Cup with Geneva.

On May 17, 2016, Mercier agreed to a two-year contract extension with Geneva. During the 2016–17 season, Mercier played his 542nd regular season game with Geneva in the NL, becoming the all-time leader in term of games played for Genève-Servette.

On December 28, 2018, Mercier signed an early two-year contract extension with the team through the 2020/21 season. On January 16, 2021, Mercier was suspended for 7 games and fined CHF 5,700 after he accidentally bumped into a referee in a game against HC Ambrì-Piotta on January 12, 2021. Servette appealed the decision and both the suspension and the fine were eventually reduced to 3 games and CHF 2,520 on January 21, 2021.

On April 6, 2021, Merci was signed to an early one-year contract extension by Servette through the 2021/22 season.

Mercier retired from professional hockey following the 2021–22 season.

== International play ==
Mercier was named to Switzerland's under-18 team for the 2004 IIHF World U18 Championship Division I in Austria. He scored 1 goal to help Switzerland win the tournament and earn a promotion to the top division for the 2005 edition.

Mercier played 4 exhibition games with Switzerland men's team, never participating in any World Championships nor Olympic Games.

== Personal life ==
His father Alain Mercier also played professional hockey with Genève-Servette HC from 1985 to 1991. He appeared in 98 Swiss League games and was also a defenseman.

== Career statistics ==
=== Regular season and playoffs ===
			Regular season					Playoffs
Season	Team	League	GP	G	A	Pts	PIM	GP	G	A	Pts	PIM
2003–04	Genève-Servette HC	NLA	3	0	0	0	0	—	—	—	—	—
2004–05	Genève-Servette HC	NLA	44	3	3	6	8	4	0	0	0	2
2005–06	Genève-Servette HC	NLA	31	1	12	13	24	—	—	—	—	—
2005–06	HC Martigny	NLB	10	1	0	1	8	—	—	—	—	—
2006–07	Genève-Servette HC	NLA	40	5	8	13	30	5	1	0	1	6
2006–07	EHC Visp	NLB	1	0	0	0	2	—	—	—	—	—
2007–08	Genève-Servette HC	NLA	48	3	12	15	40	16	2	2	4	14
2008–09	Genève-Servette HC	NLA	42	0	4	4	46	4	0	0	0	4
2009–10	Genève-Servette HC	NLA	50	4	12	16	71	20	1	1	2	22
2010–11	Genève-Servette HC	NLA	49	1	5	6	20	6	0	0	0	2
2011–12	Genève-Servette HC	NLA	45	5	7	12	30	—	—	—	—	—
2012–13	Genève-Servette HC	NLA	49	3	8	11	28	7	0	1	1	6
2013–14	Genève-Servette HC	NLA	40	8	2	10	26	12	0	3	3	2
2014–15	Genève-Servette HC	NLA	40	6	11	17	14	12	1	1	2	4
2015–16	Genève-Servette HC	NLA	41	2	11	13	16	9	0	1	1	8
2016–17	Genève-Servette HC	NLA	39	2	5	7	46	4	0	0	0	2
2017–18	Genève-Servette HC	NL	20	1	2	3	20	—	—	—	—	—
2018–19	Genève-Servette HC	NL	46	5	9	14	16	6	0	2	2	4
2019–20	Genève-Servette HC	NL	37	3	10	13	14	—	—	—	—	—
2020–21	Genève-Servette HC	NL	37	2	5	7	24	—	—	—	—	—
2021–22	Genève-Servette HC	NL	4	0	0	0	0	—	—	—	—	—
NL totals			705	54	116	170	473	105	5	11	16	76

=== International ===
Year	Team	Event	Result	GP	G	A	Pts	PIM
2004	Switzerland	WJC18-D1	11th	5	1	0	1	4
Junior totals				5	1	0	1	4
