= Jakub Valský =

Czech ice hockey player

- Born: 7 September 1988 (age 37) Slaný, Czechoslovakia
- Height: 6 ft 1 in (185 cm)
- Weight: 225 lb (102 kg; 16 st 1 lb)
- Position: Forward
- Shoots: Left
- Czech.1 team Former teams: HC Tábor; Rytíři Kladno; Bílí Tygři Liberec; HC Slovan Bratislava; BK Mladá Boleslav; HC Kometa Brno; HC Olomouc; Motor České Budějovice
- Playing career: 2008–present

Jakub Valský (born September 7, 1988) is a Czech professional ice hockey player currently with HC Tábor of the 1st Czech Republic Hockey League (Czech.1). He last played in the Czech Extraliga with Motor České Budějovice.
