= 2014–15 Champions Hockey League =

European ice hockey tournament

Tournament details
- Dates: 21 August 2014 – 3 February 2015
- Teams: 44

Final positions
- Champions: (Sweden) Luleå HF (1st title)
- Runners-up: (Sweden) Frölunda HC

Tournament statistics
- Games played: 161
- Goals scored: 894 (5.55 per game)
- Attendance: 490,848 (3,049 per game)
- Scoring leader: (Norway) Mathis Olimb (26 points)

Awards
- MVP: (Norway) Mathis Olimb

The 2014–15 Champions Hockey League was the first season of the Champions Hockey League, a European ice hockey tournament launched by 26 founding clubs, six leagues and the International Ice Hockey Federation (IIHF).

The regulation round began on 21 August 2014 and ended on 8 October 2014. The playoffs began on 4 November 2014 and ended with the Champions Hockey League Final on 3 February 2015. Luleå HF defeated Frölunda HC 4–2 to win the first edition of Champions Hockey League.

On 9 December 2013, the IIHF officially announced that they had launched the Champions Hockey League tournament, starting in the 2014–15 season. The season's format was revealed on 20 December 2013, during the playoffs of the 2013 European Trophy.

== Team allocation ==
A total of 44 teams from eleven different European first-tier leagues participated in the 2014–15 Champions Hockey League. The teams were decided with regards to different licenses for the founding teams, leagues and wildcards.

=== Team license ===
The participating teams were decided with regards to different licenses for founding teams, league teams (from founding leagues) and other wildcard teams.

- A license: The 26 founding teams all got an A license, since they play in the first-tier league of their respective domestic league system in the 2014–15 season.
- B license: Two teams – the regular-season winner and the play-off champion in the 2013–14 season – from each of the founding leagues (the Austrian EBEL, the Czech Extraliga, the Finnish Liiga, the German DEL, the Swedish SHL and the Swiss NLA) received a B licence to the tournament. If those teams had already received an A license, other teams from the league took the B license spots. The order the B licenses were handed out is:
1. National champion
2. Regular season winner
3. Runner-up, regular season
4. Play-off finalist
5. Best placed semifinal loser
6. Worst placed semifinal loser
- C license: There were six wild cards, five for the champions of the Slovak Extraliga (Slovakia), GET-ligaen (Norway), Elite Ice Hockey League (United Kingdom), Ligue Magnus (France) and Metal Ligaen (Denmark), as well as one for the regular season winner of GET-ligaen. The Elite Ice Hockey League champion Belfast Giants were forced to turn down the chance due to lack of arena availability, giving place for the Challenge Cup winner Nottingham Panthers.

=== Teams ===
A full list of the teams participating in the inaugural season and how they qualified was presented on 10 May 2014.

Team	City/Area	League	Qualification	License
(Austria) Red Bull Salzburg	Salzburg	Austrian Hockey League	founding club	A
(Austria) Vienna Capitals	Vienna	Austrian Hockey League	founding club	A
(Czech Republic) Bílí Tygři Liberec	Liberec	Czech Extraliga	founding club	A
(Czech Republic) HC Pardubice	Pardubice	Czech Extraliga	founding club	A
(Czech Republic) HC Sparta Praha	Prague	Czech Extraliga	founding club	A
(Czech Republic) Vítkovice Steel	Ostrava	Czech Extraliga	founding club	A
(Finland) HIFK	Helsinki	Liiga	founding club	A
(Finland) JYP	Jyväskylä	Liiga	founding club	A
(Finland) KalPa	Kuopio	Liiga	founding club	A
(Finland) Kärpät	Oulu	Liiga	founding club	A
(Finland) Tappara	Tampere	Liiga	founding club	A
(Finland) TPS	Turku	Liiga	founding club	A
(Germany) Adler Mannheim	Mannheim	Deutsche Eishockey Liga	founding club	A
(Germany) Eisbären Berlin	Berlin	Deutsche Eishockey Liga	founding club	A
(Germany) ERC Ingolstadt	Ingolstadt	Deutsche Eishockey Liga	founding club	A
(Germany) Krefeld Pinguine	Krefeld	Deutsche Eishockey Liga	founding club	A
(Switzerland) SC Bern	Bern	National League A	founding club	A
(Switzerland) Fribourg-Gottéron	Fribourg	National League A	founding club	A
(Switzerland) ZSC Lions	Zürich	National League A	founding club	A
(Switzerland) EV Zug	Zug	National League A	founding club	A
(Sweden) Frölunda HC	Gothenburg	Swedish Hockey League	founding club	A
(Sweden) Färjestad BK	Karlstad	Swedish Hockey League	founding club	A
(Sweden) HV71	Jönköping	Swedish Hockey League	founding club	A
(Sweden) Linköpings HC	Linköping	Swedish Hockey League	founding club	A
(Sweden) Luleå HF	Luleå	Swedish Hockey League	founding club	A
(Sweden) Djurgårdens IF	Stockholm	Swedish Hockey League	founding club	A
(Sweden) Skellefteå AIK	Skellefteå	Swedish Hockey League	play-off champion	B
(Italy) HC Bolzano	Bolzano	Austrian Hockey League	play-off champion	B
(Germany) Hamburg Freezers	Hamburg	Deutsche Eishockey Liga	regular season winner	B
(Czech Republic) Oceláři Třinec	Třinec	Czech Extraliga	regular season runner-up	B
(Switzerland) Kloten Flyers	Kloten	National League A	play-off finalist	B
(Switzerland) Genève-Servette	Geneva	National League A	play-off semi-finalist	B
(Sweden) Växjö Lakers	Växjö	Swedish Hockey League	play-off semi-finalist	B
(Austria) Villach SV	Villach	Austrian Hockey League	play-off semi-finalist	B
(Finland) Lukko	Rauma	Liiga	play-off semi-finalist	B
(Finland) SaiPa	Lappeenranta	Liiga	play-off semi-finalist	B
(Germany) Kölner Haie	Cologne	Deutsche Eishockey Liga	play-off finalist	B
(Czech Republic) PSG Zlín	Zlín	Czech Extraliga	play-off champion	B
(Norway) Stavanger Oilers	Stavanger	GET-ligaen	play-off champion	C
(Slovakia) HC Košice	Košice	Tipsport Liga	champion	C
(Denmark) SønderjyskE	Vojens	Metal Ligaen	champion	C
(France) Briançon Diables Rouges	Briançon	Ligue Magnus	champion	C
(United Kingdom) Nottingham Panthers	Nottingham	Elite Ice Hockey League	Challenge Cup winner	C
(Norway) Vålerenga IF	Oslo	GET-ligaen	regular season winner	C

== Round and draw dates ==
The schedule of the competition is as follows.

Phase	Round	Draw date	First leg	Second leg
Group stage	Matchday 1	21 May 2014, 12:00 CET	21–22 August 2014	
Group stage	Matchday 2	21 May 2014, 12:00 CET	23–24 August 2014	
Group stage	Matchday 3	21 May 2014, 12:00 CET	4–5 September 2014	
Group stage	Matchday 4	21 May 2014, 12:00 CET	6–7 September 2014	
Group stage	Matchday 5	21 May 2014, 12:00 CET	23–24 September 2014	
Group stage	Matchday 6	21 May 2014, 12:00 CET	7–8 October 2014	
Playoff	Round of 16	10 October 2014, 12:00 CET	4 November 2014	11 November 2014
Playoff	Quarter-finals	10 October 2014, 12:00 CET	2 December 2014	9 December 2014
Playoff	Semi-finals	10 October 2014, 12:00 CET	13 January 2014	20 January 2015
Playoff	Final	10 October 2014, 12:00 CET	3 February 2015	

== Group stage ==
Teams in the 2014–15 Champions Hockey League
Black: Group A; Purple: Group B; Blue: Group C; Red: Group D; Orange: Group E; Green: Group F; White: Group G; Yellow: Group H; Brown: Group I; Pink: Group J; Gold: Group K.

The group stage draw took place on 21 May 2014 in Minsk, Belarus, and the teams were assigned to eleven groups from A to K. The 44 teams were allocated into four pots based on their positions in their national leagues 2014, with the top seeded teams being placed in Pot 1 and the lower ranked teams in Pot 2, Pot 3 and the lowest ranked teams in Pot 4. They were drawn into eleven groups of four, with the restriction that teams from the same association could not be drawn against each other.

In each group, teams played against each other home-and-away in a round-robin format, giving six games per team. In total, 132 games were played in the group stage.

The schedule was released on 2 June 2014, with 30 of 44 teams playing their first game 21 August 2014, and the other teams playing their first game the following day. The match days were 21–22 August, 23–24 August, 4–5 September, 6–7 September, 23–24 September and 7–8 October 2014. All game times are local times.

The 11 group winners and the five best ranked runners-up qualified for the playoffs. The five best runners-up were determined by ranking all runners-up based on their number of points and goal differential in their respective groups, explained more detailed in the detailed group stage article.

Key to colours in group tables
Group winners and the five best runners-up advanced to the playoffs

See the detailed group stage page for tiebreakers if two or more teams are equal on points.

=== Group A ===
Pos	Team	Pld	W	OTW	OTL	L	GF	GA	GD	Pts	KAR	LIB	KOS	KOL
1	(Finland) Kärpät	6	3	2	0	1	17	12	+5	13	—	3–1	3–2 (OT)	3–2 (SO)
2	(Czech Republic) Bílí Tygři Liberec	6	3	0	0	3	16	15	+1	9	3–4	—	3–2	2–1
3	(Slovakia) HC Košice	6	2	0	1	3	14	16	−2	7	1–2	4–3	—	4–3
4	(Germany) Kölner Haie	6	2	0	1	3	12	16	−4	7	3–2	1–4	2–1	—

Legend: Blue = home team win; Yellow = draw; Red = away team win.

=== Group B ===
Pos	Team	Pld	W	OTW	OTL	L	GF	GA	GD	Pts	VIC	ZSC	FBK	VIF
1	(Austria) Vienna Capitals	6	4	1	1	0	16	9	+7	15	—	5–3	4–1	2–1
2	(Switzerland) ZSC Lions	6	2	1	2	1	17	16	+1	10	2–1 (OT)	—	2–3 (OT)	4–1
3	(Sweden) Färjestad BK	6	1	3	1	1	15	13	+2	10	1–2 (SO)	4–3 (OT)	—	4–1
4	(Norway) Vålerenga IF	6	0	0	1	5	7	17	−10	1	1–2	2–3	1–2 (SO)	—

Legend: Blue = home team win; Yellow = draw; Red = away team win.

=== Group C ===
Pos	Team	Pld	W	OTW	OTL	L	GF	GA	GD	Pts	FHC	GEN	VSV	BRI
1	(Sweden) Frölunda HC	6	5	0	0	1	35	13	+22	15	—	7–3	5–2	6–2
2	(Switzerland) Genève-Servette	6	5	0	0	1	28	15	+13	15	4–3	—	4–2	5–1
3	(Austria) Villach SV	6	2	0	0	4	11	23	−12	6	1–7	0–5	—	4–1
4	(France) Briançon Diables Rouges	6	0	0	0	6	8	31	−23	0	1–7	2–7	1–2	—

Legend: Blue = home team win; Yellow = draw; Red = away team win.

=== Group D ===
Pos	Team	Pld	W	OTW	OTL	L	GF	GA	GD	Pts	FRI	ZLÍ	DIF	BER
1	(Switzerland) Fribourg-Gottéron	6	3	2	1	0	21	13	+8	14	—	3–2 (SO)	3–1	6–3
2	(Czech Republic) PSG Zlín	6	2	1	2	1	15	20	−5	10	2–3 (OT)	—	3–1	4–2
3	(Sweden) Djurgårdens IF	6	2	1	1	2	21	16	+5	9	5–4 (OT)	8–0	—	3–2
4	(Germany) Eisbären Berlin	6	0	1	1	4	14	22	−8	3	0–2	3–4 (SO)	4–3 (SO)	—

Legend: Blue = home team win; Yellow = draw; Red = away team win.

=== Group E ===
Pos	Team	Pld	W	OTW	OTL	L	GF	GA	GD	Pts	TAP	OIL	TRI	SCB
1	(Finland) Tappara	6	3	0	2	1	21	16	+5	11	—	7–3	5–1	3–5
2	(Norway) Stavanger Oilers	6	3	1	0	2	19	17	+2	11	2–1 (SO)	—	2–3	5–2
3	(Czech Republic) Oceláři Třinec	6	3	0	0	3	20	14	+6	9	1–2	4–5	—	7–0
4	(Switzerland) SC Bern	6	1	1	0	4	11	24	−13	5	4–3 (SO)	0–2	0–4	—

Legend: Blue = home team win; Yellow = draw; Red = away team win.

=== Group F ===
Pos	Team	Pld	W	OTW	OTL	L	GF	GA	GD	Pts	LHC	TPS	HCB	PCE
1	(Sweden) Linköping HC	6	4	1	0	1	20	10	+10	14	—	1–2	5–0	2–1
2	(Finland) TPS	6	3	1	1	1	21	12	+9	12	3–4 (SO)	—	9–0	2–1
3	(Italy) HC Bolzano	6	3	0	0	3	12	22	−10	9	1–2	4–2	—	4–3
4	(Czech Republic) HC Pardubice	6	0	0	1	5	11	20	−9	1	3–6	2–3 (SO)	1–3	—

Legend: Blue = home team win; Yellow = draw; Red = away team win.

=== Group G ===
Pos	Team	Pld	W	OTW	OTL	L	GF	GA	GD	Pts	SPA	VLH	KAL	MAN
1	(Czech Republic) HC Sparta Praha	6	3	1	1	1	25	19	+6	12	—	5–4	2–3	6–3
2	(Sweden) Växjö Lakers	6	4	0	0	2	19	14	+5	12	2–5	—	2–1	6–1
3	(Finland) KalPa	6	2	0	1	3	11	15	−4	7	4–5 (SO)	1–3	—	1–0
4	(Germany) Adler Mannheim	6	1	1	0	4	11	18	−7	5	3–2 (OT)	1–2	3–1	—

Legend: Blue = home team win; Yellow = draw; Red = away team win.

=== Group H ===
Pos	Team	Pld	W	OTW	OTL	L	GF	GA	GD	Pts	SAI	EVZ	VÍT	ING
1	(Finland) SaiPa	6	4	1	0	1	18	11	+7	14	—	3–0	4–3 (SO)	5–2
2	(Switzerland) EV Zug	6	3	0	1	2	14	14	0	10	1–2	—	3–2	3–2
3	(Czech Republic) Vítkovice Steel	6	1	1	1	3	18	20	−2	6	1–3	2–5	—	5–1
4	(Germany) ERC Ingolstadt	6	1	1	1	3	16	21	−5	6	4–1	3–2 (OT)	4–5 (SO)	—

Legend: Blue = home team win; Yellow = draw; Red = away team win.

=== Group I ===
Pos	Team	Pld	W	OTW	OTL	L	GF	GA	GD	Pts	RBS	JYP	HV71	KLO
1	(Austria) Red Bull Salzburg	6	5	0	0	1	23	8	+15	15	—	4–0	3–1	7–1
2	(Finland) JYP	6	3	2	0	1	15	11	+4	13	3–2	—	4–3 (SO)	2–0
3	(Sweden) HV71	6	2	0	1	3	15	17	−2	7	3–5	0–3	—	3–2
4	(Switzerland) Kloten Flyers	6	0	0	1	5	5	22	−17	1	0–2	2–3 (OT)	0–5	—

Legend: Blue = home team win; Yellow = draw; Red = away team win.

=== Group J ===
Pos	Team	Pld	W	OTW	OTL	L	GF	GA	GD	Pts	SKE	IFK	SON	KRE
1	(Sweden) Skellefteå AIK	6	5	0	0	1	20	8	+12	15	—	3–0	4–1	4–0
2	(Finland) HIFK	6	4	1	0	1	31	15	+16	14	5–3	—	10–1	6–1
3	(Denmark) SønderjyskE	6	1	0	1	4	15	31	−16	4	1–4	4–5 (SO)	—	4–5
4	(Germany) Krefeld Pinguine	6	1	0	0	5	13	25	−12	3	1–2	3–5	3–4	—

Legend: Blue = home team win; Yellow = draw; Red = away team win.

=== Group K ===
Pos	Team	Pld	W	OTW	OTL	L	GF	GA	GD	Pts	LUK	LHF	HAM	NOT
1	(Finland) Lukko	6	5	0	0	1	21	7	+14	15	—	2–0	5–0	6–2
2	(Sweden) Luleå HF	6	5	0	0	1	32	6	+26	15	3–1	—	6–0	9–1
3	(Germany) Hamburg Freezers	6	1	0	0	5	8	21	−13	3	0–3	1–4	—	6–0
4	(United Kingdom) Nottingham Panthers	6	1	0	0	5	9	36	−27	3	2–4	1–10	3–1	—

Legend: Blue = home team win; Yellow = draw; Red = away team win.

=== Ranking of second-placed teams ===
Grp	Team	Pld	W	OTW	OTL	L	GF	GA	GD	Pts
K	(Sweden) Luleå HF	6	5	0	0	1	32	6	+26	15
C	(Switzerland) Genève-Servette	6	5	0	0	1	28	15	+13	15
J	(Finland) HIFK	6	4	1	0	1	31	15	+16	14
I	(Finland) JYP	6	3	2	0	1	15	11	+4	13
F	(Finland) TPS	6	3	1	1	1	21	12	+9	12
G	(Sweden) Växjö Lakers	6	4	0	0	2	19	14	+5	12
E	(Norway) Stavanger Oilers	6	3	1	0	2	19	17	+2	11
B	(Switzerland) ZSC Lions	6	2	1	2	1	17	16	+1	10
H	(Switzerland) EV Zug	6	3	0	1	2	14	14	0	10
D	(Czech Republic) PSG Zlín	6	2	1	2	1	15	20	−5	10
A	(Czech Republic) Bílí Tygři Liberec	6	3	0	0	3	16	15	+1	9

For tiebreakers if two or more teams are equal on points, see the detailed group stage page.

== Playoffs ==
In the playoffs, the teams played against each other over two legs on a home-and-away basis with the team with the better standing after the group stage having the second game at home, except for the one-match final played at the venue of the team with the best competition track record leading up to the final.

The mechanism of the draw for playoffs are as follows:

- The entire playoff was drawn at a single occasion on 10 October 2014 to determine the eight pairings for the round of 16. After the draw, all matches up to the final are set in brackets.
- In the draw for the round of 16, the eight best group winners were seeded, and the three group winners with worst record and the five best runners-up were unseeded. The seeded teams were drawn against the unseeded teams, with the seeded teams hosting the second leg. Teams from the same group could not be drawn against each other.

=== Bracket ===
Round of 16
1	(Finland) JYP	5	2	7(2)
16	(Sweden) Skellefteå AIK (SO)	4	3	7(3)
8	(Czech Republic) HC Sparta Praha	1	2	3
9	(Sweden) Linköpings HC	2	2	4
5	(Finland) TPS	1	4	5
12	(Finland) Lukko	5	3	8
4	(Sweden) Luleå HF (SO)	2	7	9(2)
13	(Austria) Red Bull Salzburg	4	5	9(0)
6	(Switzerland) Genève-Servette	2	2	4(0)
11	(Finland) SaiPa (SO)	0	4	4(3)
3	(Finland) Kärpät	3	3	6
14	(Austria) Vienna Capitals	1	2	3
7	(Finland) Tappara	1	2	3
10	(Sweden) Frölunda HC	5	4	9
2	(Switzerland) Fribourg-Gottéron	2	1	3
15	(Finland) HIFK	2	3	5

Quarter-finals
(Sweden) Linköpings HC	1	4	5(0)
(Sweden) Skellefteå AIK (SO)	2	3	5(1)
(Finland) Lukko	2	1	3
(Sweden) Luleå HF	5	2	7
(Finland) SaiPa	0	2	2
(Finland) Kärpät	2	3	5
(Finland) HIFK	2	3	5
(Sweden) Frölunda HC	1	5	6

Semi-finals
(Sweden) Skellefteå AIK	2	2	4
(Sweden) Luleå HF	2	3	5
(Sweden) Frölunda HC (OT)	4	2	6
(Finland) Kärpät	2	3	5

Final
(Sweden) Luleå HF	4
(Sweden) Frölunda HC	2

Note:

1. The teams listed on top of each tie play first match at home and the bottom team plays second match at home.

=== Round of 16 ===
The draw for the entire playoff (round of 16, quarter-finals, semi-finals and final) was held on 10 October 2014. The first legs were played on 4 November, and the second legs were played on 11 November 2014.

Team 1	Agg.	Team 2	1st leg	2nd leg
JYP (Finland)	7–8 (2–3 SO)	(Sweden) Skellefteå AIK	5–4	2–4 (OT)
Genève-Servette (Switzerland)	4–5 (0–3 SO)	(Finland) SaiPa	2–0	2–5 (OT)
HC Sparta Praha (Czech Republic)	3–4	(Sweden) Linköpings HC	1–2	2–2
Kärpät (Finland)	6–3	(Austria) Vienna Capitals	3–1	3–2
TPS (Finland)	5–8	(Finland) Lukko	1–5	4–3
Tappara (Finland)	3–9	(Sweden) Frölunda HC	1–5	2–4
Luleå HF (Sweden)	10–9 (2–0 SO)	(Austria) Red Bull Salzburg	2–4	8–5 (OT)
Fribourg-Gottéron (Switzerland)	3–5	(Finland) HIFK	2–2	1–3

Notes

1. Order of legs reversed after original draw, since HIFK home ice was unavailable on 4 November.

=== Quarter-finals ===
The first legs were played on 2 December, and the second legs were played on 9 December 2014.

Team 1	Agg.	Team 2	1st leg	2nd leg
Linköpings HC (Sweden)	5–6 (0–1 SO)	(Sweden) Skellefteå AIK	1–2	4–4 (OT)
Lukko (Finland)	3–7	(Sweden) Luleå HF	2–5	1–2
SaiPa (Finland)	2–5	(Finland) Kärpät	0–2	2–3
HIFK (Finland)	5–6	(Sweden) Frölunda HC	2–1	3–5

=== Semi-finals ===
The first legs were played on 13 January, and the second legs were played on 20 January 2015.

Team 1	Agg.	Team 2	1st leg	2nd leg
Skellefteå AIK (Sweden)	4–5	(Sweden) Luleå HF	2–2	2–3
Frölunda HC (Sweden)	6–5	(Finland) Kärpät	4–2	2–3 (OT)

=== Final ===
The final was played on 3 February 2015 at the venue of the team with the best competition track record leading up to the final.

3 February 2015; 20:15	Luleå HF (Sweden)	4–2 (0–2, 0–0, 4–0)	(Sweden) Frölunda HC	Coop Norrbotten Arena, Luleå; Attendance: 6,300

Game reference

Joel Lassinantti
Goalies
Linus Fernström
Referees:
(Germany) Daniel Piechaczek
(Finland) Aleksi Rantala
Linesmen:
(Germany) André Schrader
(Finland) Sakari Suominen

	0–1	00:17 – Lundqvist (Lehkonen, Fälth)
	0–2	12:45 – Olimb (Johnsson, Görtz)
Näkyvä (Abbott) (PP) – 47:43	1–2
Cehlárik (Fagerudd, Näkyvä) (PP) – 48:57	2–2
Forsberg (Sandström) (PP) – 53:04	3–2
Kukan (Sandström, Granström) (ENG) – 58:36	4–2

8 min
Penalties
45 min
25
Shots
27

== Statistics ==
=== Leading scorers ===
Rankings based upon points, and sorted by goals.

Rank	Player	Team	v	v	v	v	v	v
1	(Norway) Mathis Olimb	(Sweden) Frölunda HC	10	7	17	24	6	+11
2	(Sweden) Andreas Johnson	(Sweden) Frölunda HC	9	11	12	23	6	+13
3	(Sweden) Erik Gustafsson	(Sweden) Frölunda HC	10	5	12	17	2	+7
4	(Canada) Matt D'Agostini	(Switzerland) Genève-Servette	8	4	9	13	6	+7
5	(Sweden) Daniel Zaar	(Sweden) Luleå HF	10	6	6	12	0	+4
6	(Sweden) Max Görtz	(Sweden) Frölunda HC	10	5	7	12	0	+5
7	(Sweden) Pär Lindholm	(Sweden) Skellefteå AIK	10	1	11	12	2	+10
8	(Finland) Joonas Donskoi	(Finland) Kärpät	10	7	4	11	2	+11
9	(Finland) Niklas Fogstrom	(Sweden) Luleå HF	10	5	6	11	0	+9
9	(Sweden) Per Ledin	(Sweden) Luleå HF	10	5	6	11	4	+5

=== Leading goaltenders ===
Goalkeepers with 40% or more of their team's total minutes, ranked by save percentage.

Rank	Goaltender	Team	Minutes	v	v	v	Saves	v
1	(Slovenia) Luka Gračnar	(Austria) Red Bull Salzburg	300:00	5	1.00	.966	141	2
2	(Switzerland) Melvin Nyffeler	(Switzerland) Fribourg-Gottéron	243:11	6	1.48	.957	133	1
3	(Czech Republic) Marek Schwarz	(Czech Republic) Bílí Tygři Liberec	211:25	5	1.42	.956	109	0
4	(Sweden) Joel Lassinantti	(Sweden) Luleå HF	257:12	5	1.17	.948	91	0
5	(Canada) Justin Pogge	(Sweden) Färjestads BK	290:36	7	1.45	.940	109	0
6	(Sweden) Marcus Högberg	(Sweden) Linköpings HC	362:35	10	1.65	.933	143	0
7	(Lithuania) Mantas Armalis	(Sweden) Djurgårdens IF	246:14	8	1.95	.933	112	1
8	(Finland) Iiro Tarkki	(Finland) Kärpät	304:55	7	1.38	.931	95	1
9	(Sweden) Stefan Steen	(Sweden) Växjö Lakers	199:20	5	1.51	.931	67	0
10	(Finland) Eero Kilpeläinen	(Finland) KalPa	303:48	11	2.17	.930	146	1

=== Home Game and Overall ===
As of 3 February 2015

Pos.	Team	Regular season		Playoffs		Overall		
Pos.	Team	Matches	Attendance	Matches	Attendance	Matches	Total	Average
1	(Germany) Eisbären Berlin	3	16,720	0	—	3	16,720	5,573
2	(Germany) Adler Mannheim	3	15,965	0	-	3	15,965	5,322
3	(Germany) Hamburg Freezers	3	15,227	0	-	3	15,227	5,076
4	(Slovakia) HC Košice	3	14,095	0	—	3	14,095	4,698
5	(Switzerland) Genève-Servette HC	3	13,567	1	5,214	4	18,781	4,695
6	(Switzerland) SC Bern	3	13,572	0	-	3	13,572	4,524
7	(Austria) Vienna Capitals	3	11,500	1	4,700	4	16,200	4,050
8	(Finland) Kärpät	3	10,697	3	13,599	6	24,296	4,049
9	(Germany) Kölner Haie	3	11,952	0	—	3	11,952	3,984
10	(United Kingdom) Nottingham Panthers	3	11,490	0	—	3	11,490	3,830
11	(Sweden) Luleå HF	3	8,622	4	17,651	7	26,273	3,753
12	(Finland) HIFK	3	10,011	2	8,667	5	18,678	3,736
13	(Sweden) Frölunda HC	3	10,836	3	10,914	6	21,750	3,625
14	(Norway) Stavanger Oilers	3	10,698	0	-	3	10,698	3,566
15	(Finland) TPS	3	10,263	1	3,642	4	13,905	3,476
16	(Czech Republic) Oceláři Třinec	3	10,405	0	—	3	10,405	3,468
17	(Sweden) Linköpings HC	3	11,431	2	4,713	5	16,144	3,229
18	(Czech Republic) Vítkovice Steel	3	9,686	0	—	3	9,686	3,229
19	(Germany) Krefeld Pinguine	3	9,136	0	—	3	9,136	3,045
20	(Czech Republic) PSG Zlín	3	9,048	0	-	3	9,048	3,016
21	(Sweden) Skellefteå AIK	3	8,836	3	8,634	6	17,470	2,912
22	(Switzerland) EV Zug	3	8,681	0	-	3	8,681	2,894
23	(Sweden) Växjö Lakers	3	8,676	0	-	3	8,676	2,892
24	(Finland) SaiPa	3	9,162	2	5,017	5	14,179	2,836
25	(Sweden) Djurgårdens IF	3	8,450	0	—	3	8,450	2,817
26	(Finland) Tappara	3	8,337	1	2,546	4	10,883	2,721
27	(Finland) Lukko	3	8,345	2	4,696	5	13,041	2,608
28	(Finland) KalPa	3	7,691	0	-	3	7,691	2,564
29	(Austria) Villach SV	3	7,683	0	—	3	7,683	2,561
30	(Sweden) HV71	3	7,149	0	—	3	7,149	2,383
31	(Switzerland) HC Fribourg-Gottéron	3	7,228	1	1,171	4	9,399	2,350
32	(Austria) Red Bull Salzburg	3	6,376	1	2,610	4	8,986	2,247
33	(Czech Republic) HC Sparta Praha	3	6,469	1	2,381	4	8,850	2,213
34	(Switzerland) ZSC Lions	3	8,746	0	-	4	8,746	2,187
35	(Norway) Vålerenga IF	3	6,121	0	—	3	6,121	2,040
36	(Denmark) SønderjyskE	3	5,665	0	—	3	5,665	1,888
37	(Finland) JYP	3	5,719	1	1,757	4	7,476	1,869
38	(Czech Republic) Bílí Tygři Liberec	3	5,345	0	—	3	5,345	1,782
39	(Sweden) Färjestad BK	3	4,807	0	-	3	4,807	1,602
40	(Italy) HC Bolzano	3	4,186	0	—	3	4,186	1,395
41	(Czech Republic) HC Pardubice	3	4,011	0	—	3	4,011	1,337
42	(Germany) ERC Ingolstadt	3	3,666	0	—	3	3,666	1,222
43	(Switzerland) Kloten Flyers	3	3,423	0	—	3	3,423	1,141
44	(France) Briançon Diables Rouges	3	2,746	0	—	3	2,746	915
Tournament total		132	392,439	29	97,912	161	490,351	3,046

Source: Champions Hockey League.

== Prize money ==
The 44 teams competed for a grand total of 1.5 million euros. However, the money distribution was not announced.
