= Genève-Servette Hockey Club =

- Nickname: Les Aigles (The Eagles)
- City: Geneva, Switzerland
- League: National League: NL (1964–1975, 2001–present); SL (1956–1964, 1975–1980, 1995–2001); MySports League (1980–1995)
- Founded: 1905
- Home arena: Patinoire des Vernets
- Colours
- Owner: Fondation 1890
- General manager: Marc Gautschi
- Head coach: Jan Cadieux
- Captain: Noah Rod
- Affiliates: HC Sierre
- Website: www.gshc.ch

Championships
- Playoff championships: 2023
- Champions Hockey League: 2024

Current uniform
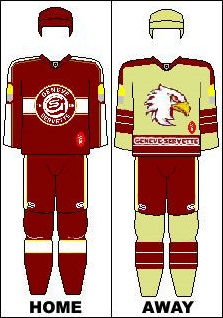

Genève-Servette Hockey Club, also known as Genève-Servette HC, (also called Servette or GSHC) is a professional ice hockey club based in Geneva, Switzerland. The team competes in the National League (NL), the highest league in Switzerland. The team plays its home games at the Patinoire des Vernets, which has a seating capacity of 7,135.

The team is currently the oldest team in the NL, being founded in 1905.

== Team history ==
- 1905 : Foundation of Servette FC's ice hockey section.
- 1954 : The club plays on artificial ice for the first time, in the "Pavillon des Sports". Until then, Servette had to host its opponents in Lausanne or au Pont. The first match on the new artificial ice sees Servette play Urania Genève Sport (UGS).
- 1956 : First promotion in Swiss National League B.
- 1958 : Inauguration of the new ice rink called "Les Vernets".
- 1959 : Servette wins the "Swiss Cup" after beating Neuchâtel-Sports Young Sprinters HC 7–3 in the final, in front of 11,820 fans, it is a crowd record for a hockey game in Les Vernets.
- 1963 : Creation of Genève-Servette HC after the fusion of the ice hockey sections of Servette & UGS.
- 1964 : Genève-Servette is champion of the Swiss National League B (second division), after beating the EHC Biel in the final, and is promoted to the top league in Switzerland, the National League A.
- 1975 : Relegated to the Swiss National League B.
- 1980 : Relegated to 1. Liga (3rd division).
- 1995 : Promoted to National League B again, after a victory over Luzern.
- 2001 : Promoted to National League A, after a successful series (4–0) over Chur in the final.
- 2008 : On March 24, the GSHC reaches the Swiss National League A final for the first time in its history, after a clear win over HC Fribourg-Gottéron in the semi-finals (4–1 in the series).
- 2010 : After a good season (2nd place), the GSHC defeated HC Fribourg-Gottéron in quarter-finals after being led 3–1 and EV Zug in semi-finals. Against SC Bern in Finals, the GSHC came back from 3–1 to 3–3 before losing the seventh game in Bern.
- 2011 : Were third-most attended team in Switzerland for the 2010–11 season with 6,971 spectators per game.
- 2013 : Winner of the Spengler Cup.
- 2014 : Second consecutive Spengler Cup win.
- 2017 : Fell to EHC Kloten in the Swiss Cup final.
- 2023 : finished first in the regular season of the Swiss National League for the first time in history, tied on points with EHC Biel, but better by goal difference by a tiny margin of three goals (+45 vs. +42). Genève-Servette became Swiss champions after defeating Biel in the playoff-final, earning them a spot in the 2023–24 Champions Hockey League tournament.
- 2024 : GSHC won the Champions Hockey League in the final against Skellefteå AIK and are the first Swiss club after ZSC Lions (2009) to do so.

== Team information ==
=== Les Vernets ===
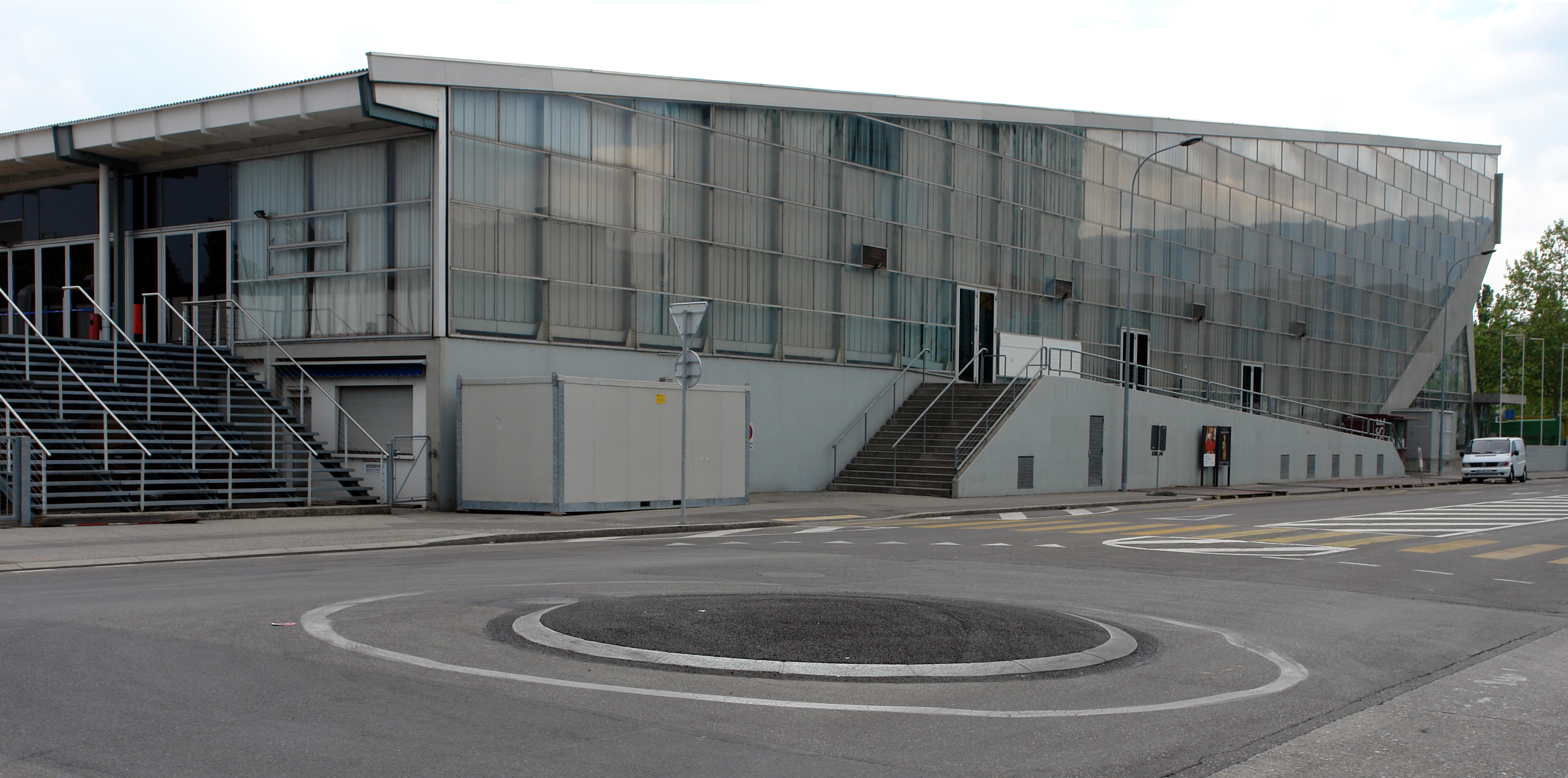
Outside view of the Vernets

The Patinoire des Vernets was built in 1959 and is located in the Geneva neighborhood of the same name. It serves as the main arena for the GSHC. It was renovated in 2009 in order to increase the spectator capacity from 6400 to 7140.

On January 24, 2012, local authorities and the club reached an agreement to build a new arena, in another part of town, with a seating capacity of 10,000. In 2012, it was scheduled to open by 2015, or possibly 2016. As of 2019, construction has yet to start.

=== Mascots ===
The official mascots of Genève-Servette are Calvin and Calvina, two anthropomorphic eagles that first appeared at the beginning of the 2006-2007 season. They are Switzerland's first and only mascot duo. Their names are derived from John Calvin, famous theologian of the Protestant reformation in Geneva.

In addition, Sherkan, a bald eagle, opens every home game by flying throughout the arena, reaching for his master standing in the center of ice. Sherkan is very popular amongst fans and players alike. Sherkan is Europe's first living animal to partake in an ice-hockey game opening ceremony.

Sherkan first appeared during the NLB playoffs of 2001 and has been present to every home game ever since, only missing two.

=== Head coaches ===
Chris McSorley served as head coach and general manager between 2001 and 2017 and was also co-owner until 2014, alongside Hugh Quennec. Chris McSorley is the brother of Marty McSorley, two times winner of the Stanley Cup with the Edmonton Oilers. On March 22, 2017, Chris McSorley stepped down as head coach to focus on his job as general manager. A position he assumed for the entire 2017–18 season. At the end of this season, it was announced that McSorley would return as head coach of Geneva for the 2018/19 season, while keeping his position as general manager. McSorley had signed a 15-year contract with the team in September 2016 worth CHF 10 million, while the club was still under Quennec ownership. The contract runs through the 2030/31 season.

On June 26, 2017, it was announced that Craig Woodcroft would replace McSorley at the helm of the team for the next three seasons. At the end of the 2017/18 season, Woodcroft was relieved of his duties as head coach after only one season. Geneva will still pay him the remaining CHF 2 million on his contract.

On April 17, 2019, Patrick Emond, the Junior Elite team's coach was promoted head coach. He worked with the Junior team for 9 years, winning recently 2 national titles with them. It will be his first experience with an adult team. On November 10, 2021, Emond was fired by Servette as the team was sitting 11th in the standings after 23 regular season games at the time. Jan Cadieux, who was an assistant coach at the time, took over as head coach. Louis Matte, Sébastien Beaulieu, Mathieu Fernandes and Kevin Oulevey remained in the coaching staff.

== Honours ==
=== Champions ===
- National League (1): 2023
- Swiss League (1): 2001
- Swiss Cup (2): 1959, 1972
- Spengler Cup (2): 2013, 2014
- Basler Cup (1): 1962
- Champions Hockey League (1): 2024

=== Runners-up ===
- NL Championship (9): 1917, 1966, 1967, 1968, 1969, 1971, 2008, 2010, 2021
- Swiss Cup (1): 2017
- Basel Summer Ice Hockey (1): 2009

== Players ==
=== Current roster ===
Updated 29 October 2026.

No.	Nat	Player	Pos	S/G	Age	Acquired	Birthplace
21	(Austria)	Oliver Achermann	C	R	32	2026	Altdorf, Switzerland
88	(Switzerland)	Raphael Achermann	LW	L	18	2026	Fribourg, Switzerland
91	(Canada)	Jason Akeson	RW	R	36	2025	Orleans, Ontario, Canada
3	(Sweden)	Adam Boqvist	D	R	26	2026	Falun, Sweden
94	(France)	Tim Bozon	LW	L	33	2025	St. Louis, Missouri, United States
8	(Canada)	Jérémie Bucheler	D	R	26	2026	Montreal, Quebec, Canada
14	(Switzerland)	Giancarlo Chanton	D	L	23	2021	Büsserach, Switzerland
38	(Switzerland)	Stéphane Charlin	G	L	26	2025	Geneva, Switzerland
98	(Switzerland)	Arthur Dandois	W	L	19	2026	Delémont, Switzerland
60	(Finland)	Markus Granlund (A)	C	L	33	2024	Oulu, Finland
67	(Norway)	William Hedlund	F	R	24	2026	Lørenskog, Norway
18	(Switzerland)	Mika Henauer	D	L	26	2026	Zürich, Switzerland
13	(Switzerland)	Luca Hischier	C	L	31	2024	Naters, Switzerland
80	(Lithuania)	Simas Ignatavicius	F	R	19	2025	Memphis, Tennessee, United States
19	(Canada)	Josh Jooris (A)	C	R	36	2021	Burlington, Ontario, Canada
25	(Switzerland)	Roger Karrer	D	R	29	2019	Zürich, Switzerland
33	(Switzerland)	Johnny Kneubühler	F	L	30	2026	Reiden, Switzerland
90	(Switzerland)	Simon Le Coultre	D	L	27	2019	Le Sentier, Switzerland
93	(Canada)	Tristan Lemyre	C	R	25	2026	Mirabel, Quebec, Canada
65	(Finland)	Sakari Manninen	F	L	34	2023	Oulu, Finland
85	(Switzerland)	Marco Miranda	LW	L	28	2019	Zürich, Switzerland
20	(Switzerland)	Nicolas Müller	F	R	27	2026	Arisdorf, Switzerland
11	(Switzerland)	Vincent Praplan	C	R	32	2022	Sierre, Switzerland
9	(Finland)	Jesse Puljujärvi	RW	R	28	2025	Älvkarleby, Sweden
71	(Switzerland)	Tanner Richard (A)	C	L	33	2017	Markham, Ontario, Canada
96	(Switzerland)	Noah Rod (C)	LW	L	30	2012	La Chaux-de-Fonds, Switzerland
44	(Czech Republic)	Jan Rutta	D	R	36	2025	Písek, Czechia
46	(Finland)	Vili Saarijärvi	D	R	29	2025	Rovaniemi, Finland
77	(Switzerland)	Dave Sutter	D	R	34	2025	Douala, Cameroon
5	(Switzerland)	Ramon Untersander	D	R	35	2026	Alt Sankt-Johann, Switzerland
39	(Switzerland)	Joren van Pottelberghe	G	L	29	2026	Zug, Switzerland
23	(Canada)	Matthew Verboon	RW	L	26	2025	Richmond Hill, Ontario, Canada
16	(United States)	Jimmy Vesey	LW	L	33	2025	Boston, Massachusetts, United States

=== Notable alumni ===
- Logan Couture
- Yannick Weber
- Tom Pyatt
- Reto Pavoni
- Philippe Bozon
- Oleg Petrov
- Kevin Romy
- Goran Bezina
- Juraj Kolník
- Daniel Vukovic
- Igor Fedulov
- Valtteri Filppula
