= 2025–26 National League (ice hockey) season =

Swiss hockey season

2025–26 National League season
- League: National League
- Sport: Ice hockey
- Duration: 9 September 2025 – 9 March 2026
- Games: 52
- Teams: 14

Regular season
- Best record: HC Davos
- Runners-up: HC Fribourg-Gottéron
- Season MVP: Matěj Stránský (HC Davos)
- Top scorer: Markus Granlund (Genève-Servette)

Swiss champion NL
- Champions: HC Fribourg-Gottéron
- Runners-up: HC Davos

National League seasons
- ← 2024–25 2026–27 →

The 2025–26 National League season is the 88th season of Swiss professional ice hockey and the ninth season as the National League (NL). The ZSC Lions are the defending champion.

Four teams from the NL qualified for 2025–26 Champions Hockey League (CHL), those teams being the ZSC Lions, Lausanne HC, SC Bern, and EV Zug.

The teams did not change from the 2024–25 season as HC Ajoie won the relegation match against EHC Visp, the winner of the Swiss League (SL).

== Teams ==
NL teams for the 2025–26 season

Team	City	Arena	Capacity
HC Ajoie	Porrentruy	Raiffeisen Arena	5,078
HC Ambrì-Piotta	Ambrì	Gottardo Arena	6,775
SC Bern	Bern	PostFinance Arena	17,031
EHC Biel	Biel/Bienne	Tissot Arena	6,562
HC Davos	Davos	Eisstadion Davos	6,547
Fribourg-Gottéron	Fribourg	BCF Arena	9,075
Genève-Servette HC	Geneva	Patinoire des Vernets	7,135
EHC Kloten	Kloten	SWISS Arena	7,624
Lausanne HC	Lausanne	Vaudoise Aréna	9,600
HC Lugano	Lugano	Cornèr Arena	7,800
SCL Tigers	Langnau im Emmental	Ilfis Stadium	6,000
SC Rapperswil-Jona Lakers	Rapperswil	St. Galler Kantonalbank Arena	6,100
ZSC Lions	Zürich	Swiss Life Arena	12,000
EV Zug	Zug	Bossard Arena	7,200

== Standings ==
During the regular season, teams gain 3 points for a win in regulation time, 2 for a win in overtime, 1 for a loss in overtime, and none for a loss in regulation.

Pos	Team	Pld	W	OTW	OTL	L	GF	GA	GD	Pts	Qualification
1	HC Davos	52	34	5	5	8	191	120	+71	117	Advance to Playoffs, Regular season winners and 2026–27 Champions Hockey League qualification
2	HC Fribourg-Gottéron (C)	52	24	13	2	13	172	126	+46	100	Advance to Playoffs and 2026–27 Champions Hockey League qualification (Note: As HC Fribourg-Gottéron finished second and won the playoffs, Genève-Servette HC qualified as the highest-placed team not already qualified.)
3	Genève-Servette HC	52	26	5	3	18	162	147	+15	91	Advance to Playoffs and 2026–27 Champions Hockey League qualification
4	ZSC Lions	52	25	4	8	15	147	115	+32	91	Advance to Playoffs
5	HC Lugano	52	26	2	7	17	150	120	+30	89	Advance to Playoffs
6	Lausanne HC	52	22	7	5	18	155	137	+18	85	Advance to Playoffs
7	SC Rapperswil-Jona Lakers	52	21	6	6	19	150	154	−4	81	Advance to Play-in
8	EV Zug	52	20	3	9	20	126	145	−19	75	Advance to Play-in
9	SC Bern	52	15	9	5	23	118	128	−10	68	Advance to Play-in
10	EHC Biel	52	14	10	5	23	143	165	−22	67	Advance to Play-in
11	SCL Tigers	52	16	4	8	24	140	147	−7	64	
12	EHC Kloten	52	15	5	8	24	117	143	−26	63	
13	HC Ambrì-Piotta	52	14	6	5	27	129	178	−49	59	Advance to Playouts
14	HC Ajoie	52	9	4	7	32	105	180	−75	42	Advance to Playouts

Rules for classification: 1) points per game 2) greater number of games played 3) greater number of away games played 4) head-to-head points
(C) Play-off Champions and Champions Hockey League

== Postseason ==
At the end of the regular season, the six teams with the most points advance to the playoffs, the next four advance to the play-ins for a chance to qualify to the playoffs. The two teams with the least point go to the playouts. The loser of the series has to face the winner of the Swiss League (SL) and are relegated to the SL if they lose (the winning team being promoted).

=== Play-in stage ===
Each round of the play-ins is played in two matches, one at each team's home arena, using aggregate scoring (the winner is defined by the total score of the two matches). The games are only played on regulation time (no overtime). If the total score at the end of regulation of the second match is even, endless overtime is played. The first game is played at the home arena of the team with the lowest regular season ranking.

In the first round, the seventh seed faces the eighth and the ninth faces the 10th. The winner of the match between the seventh and eighth qualifies for the playoffs. The loser faces the winner of the match between ninth and 10th in the second round. The winner of the second round qualifies for the playoffs. Of the two teams qualified, the one with the better regular season ranking faces the second seed in the first round of playoffs. The other team faces the first seed.

Round 1
7	SC Rapperswil-Jona Lakers	2	2	4
8	EV Zug	5	1	6
9	SC Bern	3	4	7
10	EHC Biel	4	0	4

Round 2
7	SC Rapperswil-Jona Lakers	2	4	6
9	SC Bern	1	0	1

Final Seeds
SC Rapperswil-Jona Lakers	No. 7 Seed
EV Zug	No. 8 Seed

=== Playoffs ===
The playoffs are played in a single elimination bracket, each round being a best-of-seven. The seeding is decided based on the regular season ranking. The teams play every other game at their home arena, the team with the higher regular season ranking getting the advantage for the first game. Pairings are reseeded after the first round.

Quarterfinals (best-of-7)
1	HC Davos	4
8	EV Zug	1
2	HC Fribourg-Gottéron	4
7	SC Rapperswil-Jona Lakers	3
(Pairings are reseeded after the first round)
3	Genève-Servette HC	4
6	Lausanne HC	3
4	ZSC Lions	4
5	HC Lugano	0

Semifinals (best-of-7)
1	HC Davos	4
4	ZSC Lions	1
2	HC Fribourg-Gottéron	4
3	Genève-Servette HC	1

Finals (best-of-7)
1	HC Davos	3
2	HC Fribourg-Gottéron	4

=== Playouts ===
The two teams in the NL with the least regular season points go to the Playouts. They play a seven-game series, the loser of which has to play against the winner of the Swiss League (SL). The loser of that series goes to the SL, and the winner to the NL.

With HC Sierre winning the 2025–26 Swiss League season, no relegation series was played as they did not apply for promotion.

Semifinal			Final
			1	Cancelled
13	HC Ambrì-Piotta	4	14	HC Ajoie
14	HC Ajoie	0
