= Christophe Cavalleri =

Swiss ice hockey player

- Born: January 21, 2002 (age 23); Geneva, Switzerland
- Height: 6 ft 4 in (193 cm)
- Weight: 185 lb (84 kg; 13 st 3 lb)
- Position: Centre
- Shoots: Left
- NL team Former teams: HC Ajoie; Genève-Servette HC
- Playing career: 2021–present

Christophe Cavalleri (born 21 January 2002) is a Swiss professional ice hockey centre who is currently playing with HC Ajoie of the National League (NL).

== Playing career ==
Cavalleri played all of his junior hockey with Genève-Servette HC junior teams. He won the Elite Jr. A title with Servette U20 team during the 2018–19 season.

On February 3, 2021, Cavalleri signed his first professional contract, agreeing to a three-year deal with Genève-Servette through the 2023–24 season.

On September 1, 2021, Cavalleri was sent down to the Ticino Rockets of the Swiss League (SL) to begin the 2021–22 season. Cavalleri made his NL debut on September 7, 2021, in a 4-2 loss to the ZSC Lions at the Hallenstadion.
