= 2024–25 National League (ice hockey) season =

Swiss hockey season

2024–25 National League season
- League: National League
- Sport: Ice hockey
- Duration: September 17, 2024 – April, 2025
- Games: 52
- Teams: 14

Regular season
- Best record: Lausanne HC
- Runners-up: ZSC Lions
- Season MVP: Stéphane Charlin (SCL Tigers)
- Top scorer: Austin Czarnik (SC Bern)

Swiss champion NL
- Champions: ZSC Lions
- Runners-up: Lausanne HC

National League seasons
- ← 2023–24 2025–26 →

The 2024–25 National League season is the 87th season of Swiss professional ice hockey and the eighth season as the National League (NL). The ZSC Lions are the defending champion.

4 teams from the NL also played in the Champions Hockey League (CHL), those teams being the ZSC Lions, HC Fribourg-Gottéron, Lausanne HC and Genève-Servette HC. The ZSC Lions won the CHL Championship, granting them automatic qualification for the 2025-26 season.

The teams did not change from the 2023-24 season as no relegation match was played because HC La Chaux-de-Fonds, the winner of the Swiss League, does not meet the requirements to play in the NL.

SC Bern drew an average home league attendance of 15,821, the third-highest for European ice hockey clubs. Overall, the league drew an average attendance of 7,365, the second-highest of all European ice hockey leagues.

== Teams ==
NL teams for the 2024–25 season

Team	City	Arena	Capacity
HC Ajoie	Porrentruy	Raiffeisen Arena	5,078
HC Ambrì-Piotta	Ambrì	Gottardo Arena	6,775
SC Bern	Bern	PostFinance Arena	17,031
EHC Biel	Biel/Bienne	Tissot Arena	6,562
HC Davos	Davos	Eisstadion Davos	6,547
Fribourg-Gottéron	Fribourg	BCF Arena	9,075
Genève-Servette HC	Geneva	Patinoire des Vernets	7,135
EHC Kloten	Kloten	SWISS Arena	7,624
Lausanne HC	Lausanne	Vaudoise Aréna	9,600
HC Lugano	Lugano	Cornèr Arena	7,800
SCL Tigers	Langnau im Emmental	Ilfis Stadium	6,000
SC Rapperswil-Jona Lakers	Rapperswil	St. Galler Kantonalbank Arena	6,100
ZSC Lions	Zürich	Swiss Life Arena	12,000
EV Zug	Zug	Bossard Arena	7,200

== Regular season ==
During the regular season, teams gain 3 points for a win in regulation time, 2 for a win in overtime, 1 for a loss in overtime, and none for a loss in regulation.

=== Standings ===
Pos	Team	Pld	W	OTW	OTL	L	GF	GA	GD	Pts	Qualification
1	Lausanne HC	52	25	9	4	14	153	128	+25	97	Advance to Playoffs, Regular season winners and 2025-26 Champions Hockey League qualification
2	ZSC Lions (L, C)	52	22	11	5	14	156	121	+35	93	Advance to Playoffs and 2025-26 Champions Hockey League qualification
3	SC Bern	52	24	3	13	12	165	139	+26	91	Advance to Playoffs and 2025-26 Champions Hockey League qualification (Note: With ZSC Lions finishing second,winning the 2024–25 Champions Hockey League, and winning the 2024–25 National League Playoffs.The second and third CHL qualifying spots went next two best club in 2024–25 National League regular standings not already qualified, SC Bern and EV Zug.)
4	EV Zug	52	25	5	3	19	173	136	+37	88	Advance to Playoffs and 2025-26 Champions Hockey League qualification
5	HC Davos	52	22	7	6	17	147	129	+18	86	Advance to Playoffs
6	HC Fribourg-Gottéron	52	21	5	10	16	132	128	+4	83	Advance to Playoffs
7	EHC Kloten	52	21	7	2	22	134	149	−15	79	Advance to Play-In
8	SCL Tigers	52	20	4	7	21	133	126	+7	75	Advance to Play-In
9	SC Rapperswil-Jona Lakers	52	19	4	8	21	141	154	−13	73	Advance to Play-In
10	HC Ambrì-Piotta	52	12	14	9	17	146	158	−12	73	Advance to Play-In
11	EHC Biel	52	17	7	6	22	130	133	−3	71	
12	Genève-Servette HC	52	17	7	6	22	141	153	−12	71	
13	HC Lugano	52	20	1	4	27	137	160	−23	66	Advance to Playout
14	HC Ajoie	52	11	4	5	32	114	188	−74	46	Advance to Playout

Rules for classification: 1) points per game 2) greater number of games played 3) greater number of away games played 4) head-to-head points
(C) Play-off Champions and Champions Hockey League; (L) 2024–25 CHL Champion

== Postseason ==
At the end of the regular season, the 6 teams with the most points advance to the playoffs, the next 4 advance to the play-ins for a chance to qualify to the playoffs. The 2 teams with the least point go to the playouts. The loser of the series has to face the winner of the Swiss League and are relegated to the Swiss League if they lose (the winning team being promoted).

=== Play-in stage ===
Each round of the play-ins is played in 2 matches, one at each team's home arena, using aggregate scoring (the winner is defined by the total score of the 2 matches). The games are only played on regulation time (no overtime). If the total score at the end of regulation of the second match is even, endless overtime is played. The first game is played at the home arena of the team with the lowest regular season ranking.

In the first round, the 7th seed faces the 8th and the 9th faces the 10th. The winner of the match between the 7th and 8th qualifies for the playoffs. The loser faces the winner of the match between 9th and 10th in the second round. The winner of the second round qualifies for the playoffs. Of the 2 teams qualified, the one with the better regular season ranking faces the second seed in the first round of playoffs. The other team faces the first seed.

Round 1
7	EHC Kloten	1	2	3
8	SCL Tigers	3	1	4
9	SC Rapperswil-Jona Lakers	1	3	4
10	HC Ambrì-Piotta	2	3	5

Round 2
EHC Kloten	5	5	10
HC Ambrì-Piotta	4	4	8

Final Seeds
EHC Kloten	No. 7 Seed
SCL Tigers	No. 8 Seed

=== Playoffs ===
The playoffs are played in a single elimination bracket, each round being a best of seven. The seeding is decided based on the regular season ranking. The teams play every other game at their home arena, the team with the higher regular season ranking getting the advantage for the first game.

Quarterfinals (best-of-7)
1	Lausanne HC	4
8	SCL Tigers	3
4	EV Zug	0
5	HC Davos	4
(Pairings are reseeded after the first round)
2	ZSC Lions	4
7	EHC Kloten	1
3	SC Bern	3
6	HC Fribourg-Gottéron	4

Semifinals (best-of-7)
1	Lausanne HC	4
6	HC Fribourg-Gottéron	3
2	ZSC Lions	4
5	HC Davos	2

Finals (best-of-7)
1	Lausanne HC	1
2	ZSC Lions	4

=== Playouts ===
The 2 teams in the NL with the least regular season point go to the Playouts. They play a 7 game series, the loser of which has to play against the winner of the Swiss League. The loser of this series goes to the Swiss League and the winner to the National League. The winners of the 2024–25 Swiss League season were EHC Visp.

Semifinal			Final
			1	EHC Visp	1
13	HC Lugano	4	14	HC Ajoie	4
14	HC Ajoie	2
