= Robin Grossmann =

Swiss ice hockey player

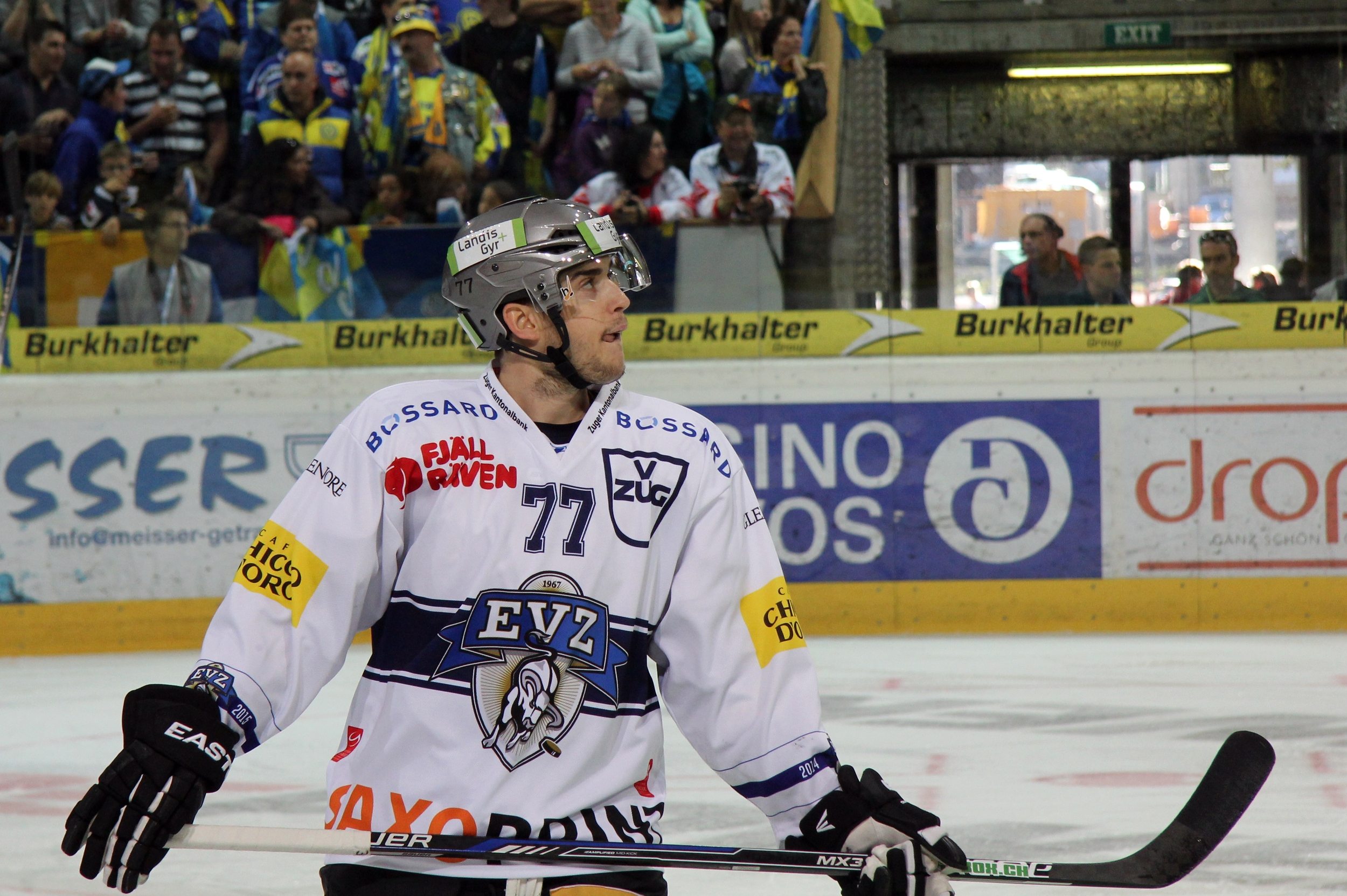
- Born: 17 August 1987 (age 38) Dintikon, Switzerland
- Height: 5 ft 11 in (180 cm)
- Weight: 187 lb (85 kg; 13 st 5 lb)
- Position: Defence
- Shoots: Left
- NL team Former teams: EHC Biel; Kloten Flyers; HC Davos; EV Zug; Lausanne HC
- National team: Switzerland
- Playing career: 2005–present

Robin Grossmann (born 17 August 1987) is a Swiss professional ice hockey defenseman who is currently playing for EHC Biel of the National League (NL).

== Playing career ==
On October 18, 2013, while with HC Davos, Grossmann announced he would leave at season's end to sign a four-year contract with NLA competitors, EV Zug.

On July 27, 2021, Grossmann joined EHC Biel on a three-year deal through the 2023/24 season.

== International play ==
Grossmann competed in the 2013 IIHF World Championship as a member of the silver winning Switzerland men's national ice hockey team.

== Career statistics ==
=== Regular season and playoffs ===
			Regular season					Playoffs
Season	Team	League	GP	G	A	Pts	PIM	GP	G	A	Pts	PIM
2005–06	Kloten Flyers	NLA	1	0	0	0	0	3	2	1	3	22
2006–07	Kloten Flyers	NLA	15	0	0	0	8	1	0	0	0	0
2006–07	EHC Biel	NLB	7	0	0	0	6	—	—	—	—	—
2007–08	Kloten Flyers	NLA	46	0	3	3	24	5	2	1	3	4
2007–08	EHC Biel	NLB	5	0	1	1	6	—	—	—	—	—
2008–09	HC Davos	NLA	50	3	13	16	56	21	1	3	4	20
2009–10	HC Davos	NLA	50	2	11	13	68	6	1	1	2	16
2010–11	HC Davos	NLA	50	5	16	21	72	14	2	4	6	28
2011–12	HC Davos	NLA	44	1	11	12	71	4	0	0	0	2
2012–13	HC Davos	NLA	46	3	9	12	92	7	1	1	2	0
2013–14	HC Davos	NLA	43	0	7	7	59	6	0	0	0	14
2014–15	EV Zug	NLA	50	4	22	26	83	6	0	1	1	2
2015–16	EV Zug	NLA	49	3	10	13	30	4	1	1	2	4
2016–17	EV Zug	NLA	42	2	8	10	34	15	1	2	3	35
2017–18	EV Zug	NL	18	5	5	10	33	5	0	1	1	2
2018–19	Lausanne HC	NL	49	6	10	16	26	12	0	4	4	46
2019–20	Lausanne HC	NL	43	1	5	6	36	—	—	—	—	—
2020–21	Lausanne HC	NL	50	4	10	14	22	6	0	0	0	4
2021–22	EHC Biel	NL	50	2	5	7	40	7	0	1	1	6
NL totals			696	41	145	186	754	122	11	21	32	205

Medal record

Representing Switzerland

Ice hockey

World Championships
Silver medal – second place	2013 Sweden/Finland	

=== International ===
Year	Team	Event	Result	GP	G	A	Pts	PIM
2005	Switzerland	U18	9th	6	0	1	1	4
2007	Switzerland	WJC	7th	6	1	1	2	10
2013	Switzerland	WC	2nd place, silver medalist(s)	6	0	0	0	2
2014	Switzerland	WC	10th	7	0	0	0	8
2015	Switzerland	WC	8th	8	0	2	2	4
2016	Switzerland	WC	11th	7	0	0	0	12
Junior totals				12	1	2	3	14
Senior totals				28	0	2	2	26
