= 2022–23 National League (ice hockey) season =

2022–23 National League season
- League: National League
- Sport: Ice hockey
- Duration: September 14, 2022 – March 4, 2023
- Games: 52
- Teams: 14

Regular season
- Best record: Genève-Servette HC
- Runners-up: EHC Biel
- Top scorer: Roman Červenka

Playoffs

Swiss champion NL
- Champions: Genève-Servette HC (1st title)
- Runners-up: EHC Biel

National League seasons
- ← 2021–22 2023–24 →

The 2022–23 National League season was the 85th season of Swiss professional ice hockey and the sixth season as the National League (NL).

With a 52-game regular season remaining intact, 14 teams were announced to be participating in the campaign, marking the return of EHC Kloten after four years, following promotion from the Swiss League. The 2022–23 season begin the new league sponsorship partnership with Yuh Financial.

In the postseason, the quarterfinals and semifinals of the NL playoffs are split and featured on alternative days and in the NL playout finals, four foreign player licenses were allowed to participate on each team in the series against the playout loser and Swiss League champion.

== Teams ==
NL teams for the 2022–23 season

| Team | City | Arena | Capacity |
|---|---|---|---|
| HC Ajoie | Porrentruy | Raiffeisen Arena | 5,078 |
| HC Ambrì-Piotta | Ambrì | Gottardo Arena | 6,775 |
| SC Bern | Bern | PostFinance Arena | 17,031 |
| EHC Biel | Biel/Bienne | Tissot Arena | 6,562 |
| HC Davos | Davos | Eisstadion Davos | 6,547 |
| Fribourg-Gottéron | Fribourg | BCF Arena | 9,009 |
| Genève-Servette HC | Geneva | Patinoire des Vernets | 7,135 |
| EHC Kloten | Kloten | Stimo Arena | 7,624 |
| Lausanne HC | Lausanne | Vaudoise Aréna | 9,600 |
| HC Lugano | Lugano | Cornér Arena | 7,800 |
| SCL Tigers | Langnau im Emmental | Ilfis Stadium | 6,000 |
| SC Rapperswil-Jona Lakers | Rapperswil | St. Galler Kantonalbank Arena | 6,100 |
| ZSC Lions | Zürich | Swiss Life Arena | 12,000 |
| EV Zug | Zug | Bossard Arena | 7,200 |

== Regular season ==
=== Standings ===
| Pos | Team | Pld | W | OTW | OTL | L | GF | GA | GD | Pts | Qualification |
|---|---|---|---|---|---|---|---|---|---|---|---|
| 1 | Genève-Servette HC | 52 | 27 | 6 | 8 | 11 | 185 | 140 | +45 | 101 | Advance to Playoffs |
| 2 | EHC Biel | 52 | 29 | 5 | 4 | 14 | 174 | 132 | +42 | 101 | Advance to Playoffs |
| 3 | SC Rapperswil-Jona Lakers | 52 | 25 | 6 | 5 | 16 | 183 | 133 | +50 | 92 | Advance to Playoffs |
| 4 | ZSC Lions | 52 | 24 | 6 | 4 | 18 | 150 | 123 | +27 | 88 | Advance to Playoffs |
| 5 | HC Davos | 52 | 18 | 9 | 11 | 14 | 149 | 138 | +11 | 83 | Advance to Playoffs |
| 6 | EV Zug | 52 | 21 | 6 | 7 | 18 | 165 | 154 | +11 | 82 | Advance to Playoffs |
| 7 | Fribourg-Gottéron | 52 | 23 | 2 | 8 | 19 | 155 | 136 | +19 | 81 | Advance to Pre-playoffs |
| 8 | SC Bern | 52 | 16 | 9 | 8 | 19 | 150 | 158 | −8 | 74 | Advance to Pre-playoffs |
| 9 | EHC Kloten | 52 | 19 | 5 | 6 | 22 | 140 | 173 | −33 | 73 | Advance to Pre-playoffs |
| 10 | HC Lugano | 52 | 20 | 5 | 2 | 25 | 147 | 163 | −16 | 72 | Advance to Pre-playoffs |
| 11 | Lausanne HC | 52 | 17 | 7 | 6 | 22 | 139 | 160 | −21 | 71 | |
| 12 | HC Ambrì-Piotta | 52 | 13 | 11 | 5 | 23 | 151 | 163 | −12 | 66 | |
| 13 | SCL Tigers | 52 | 15 | 4 | 7 | 26 | 124 | 167 | −43 | 60 | Advance to Playout |
| 14 | HC Ajoie | 52 | 10 | 6 | 6 | 30 | 120 | 192 | −72 | 48 | Advance to Playout |

Source: NL
Rules for classification: 1) points per game 2) greater number of games played 3) greater number of away games played 4) head-to-head points

=== Statistics ===
==== Scoring leaders ====
The following shows the top ten players who led the league in points, at the conclusion of the regular season. If two or more skaters are tied (i.e. same number of points, goals and played games), all of the tied skaters are shown.

| Player | Team | GP | G | A | Pts | +/– | PIM |
|---|---|---|---|---|---|---|---|
| (Czech Republic) Roman Červenka | SC Rapperswil-Jona Lakers | 43 | 16 | 43 | 59 | +21 | 60 |
| (Sweden) Linus Omark | Genève-Servette HC | 52 | 16 | 40 | 56 | +3 | 40 |
| (Canada) Chris DiDomenico | SC Bern | 46 | 23 | 30 | 53 | +7 | 65 |
| (Switzerland) Tyler Moy | SC Rapperswil-Jona Lakers | 52 | 24 | 27 | 51 | +10 | 30 |
| (Finland) Valtteri Filppula | Genève-Servette HC | 46 | 17 | 34 | 51 | +19 | 62 |
| (Czech Republic) Jan Kovář | EV Zug | 52 | 20 | 30 | 50 | +4 | 26 |
| (Czech Republic) Michael Špaček | HC Ambri-Piotta | 50 | 14 | 36 | 50 | -1 | 8 |
| (Canada) Jonathan Ang | EHC Kloten | 52 | 20 | 29 | 49 | -5 | 44 |
| (Finland) Miro Aaltonen | EHC Kloten | 51 | 19 | 30 | 49 | +1 | 20 |
| (Canada) Daniel Winnik | Genève-Servette HC | 47 | 18 | 28 | 46 | +24 | 32 |

==== Leading goaltenders ====
The following shows the top five goaltenders who led the league in goals against average, provided that they have played at least 40% of their team's minutes, at the conclusion of the regular season.

| Player | Team(s) | GP | TOI | GA | Sv% | GAA |
|---|---|---|---|---|---|---|
| (Czech Republic) Šimon Hrubec | ZSC Lions | 33 | 1936:31 | 72 | 92.65 | 2.23 |
| (Switzerland) Melvin Nyffeler | SC Rapperswil-Jona Lakers | 42 | 2472:27 | 94 | 91.49 | 2.28 |
| (Finland) Harri Säteri | EHC Biel | 35 | 2019:05 | 77 | 92.27 | 2.29 |
| (Switzerland) Robert Mayer | Genève-Servette HC | 25 | 1455:33 | 56 | 91.32 | 2.31 |
| (Switzerland) Connor Hughes | HC Fribourg-Gottéron | 36 | 1967:20 | 76 | 90.74 | 2.32 |

== Playoffs ==
=== Bracket ===
Pre-Playoffs (best-of-3)
7 | HC Fribourg-Gottéron | 0
10 | HC Lugano | 2
8 | SC Bern | 2
9 | EHC Kloten | 1

Quarter-finals (best-of-7)
1 | Genève-Servette HC | 4
10 | HC Lugano | 2
2 | EHC Biel | 4
8 | SC Bern | 2
3 | SC Rapperswil-Jona Lakers | 2
6 | EV Zug | 4
4 | ZSC Lions | 4
5 | HC Davos | 1

Semi-finals (best-of-7)
1 | Genève-Servette HC | 4
6 | EV Zug | 1
(Pairings are re-seeded after the first and second rounds)
2 | EHC Biel | 4
4 | ZSC Lions | 0

Finals (best-of-7)
1 | Genève-Servette HC | 4
2 | EHC Biel | 3

== Relegation playoffs ==
=== Playouts ===
SCL Tigers, who finished 13th in the regular season, and HC Ajoie, who finished 14th in the regular season, played in a best-of-seven playout series, which determined the team that would retain its place in the NL for the 2023–24 season. SCL Tigers won the series in six games (4–2).

=== League qualification ===
After losing in the playout series, HC Ajoie played in a best-of-seven league qualification series against HC La Chaux-de-Fonds, who won the Swiss League in the 2022–23 season. HC Ajoie won the series in six games (4–2).

== Attendances ==
The average attendance was 5,786.

| # | Ice hockey club | Average attendance |
|---|---|---|
| 1 | SC Bern | 14,750 |
| 2 | ZSC Lions | 11,459 |
| 3 | Fribourg-Gottéron | 8,922 |
| 4 | Lausanne HC | 7,099 |
| 5 | EV Zug | 6,975 |
| 6 | HC Ambrì-Piotta | 6,480 |
| 7 | Genève-Servette | 6,265 |
| 8 | EHC Kloten | 6,109 |
| 9 | EHC Biel | 5,843 |
| 10 | HC Lugano | 5,026 |
| 11 | SCL Tigers | 4,991 |
| 12 | HC Davos | 4,978 |
| 13 | Rapperswil-Jona Lakers | 4,956 |
| 14 | HC Ajoie | 4,222 |
