= 2026–27 National League (ice hockey) season =

Swiss hockey season

2026–27 National League season
- League: National League
- Sport: Ice hockey
- Duration: 15 September 2026 – April 2027
- Games: 52
- Teams: 14

Regular season

Playoffs

National League seasons
- ← 2025–26 2027–28 →

The 2026–27 National League season is the 89th season of Swiss professional ice hockey and the tenth season as the National League (NL). HC Fribourg-Gottéron are the defending champions.

Three teams from the NL are qualified for 2026–27 Champions Hockey League (CHL), those teams being HC Fribourg-Gottéron, HC Davos, and Genève-Servette HC.

The teams did not change from the 2025–26 season as HC Sierre, who won the 2025–26 Swiss League season, did not apply for promotion.

== Teams ==
NL teams for the 2026–27 season

Team	City	Arena	Capacity
HC Ajoie	Porrentruy	Raiffeisen Arena	5,078
HC Ambrì-Piotta	Ambrì	Gottardo Arena	6,775
SC Bern	Bern	PostFinance Arena	17,031
EHC Biel	Biel/Bienne	Tissot Arena	6,562
HC Davos	Davos	Eisstadion Davos	6,547
Fribourg-Gottéron	Fribourg	BCF Arena	9,075
Genève-Servette HC	Geneva	Patinoire des Vernets	7,135
EHC Kloten	Kloten	Swiss Arena	7,624
Lausanne HC	Lausanne	Vaudoise Aréna	9,600
HC Lugano	Lugano	Cornèr Arena	7,800
SCL Tigers	Langnau im Emmental	Ilfis Stadium	6,000
SC Rapperswil-Jona Lakers	Rapperswil	St. Galler Kantonalbank Arena	6,100
ZSC Lions	Zürich	Swiss Life Arena	12,000
EV Zug	Zug	Bossard Arena	7,200

== Standings ==
During the regular season, teams gain 3 points for a win in regulation time, 2 for a win in overtime, 1 for a loss in overtime, and none for a loss in regulation. The regular season is still in progress, meaning that Playoff / Play-In / Playout qualifications are not final.

Pos	Team	Pld	W	OTW	OTL	L	GF	GA	GD	Pts	Qualification
1	ZSC Lions	22	15	5	0	2	90	48	+42	55	Advance to Playoffs, Regular season winners and 2027–28 Champions Hockey League qualification
2	SC Bern	22	11	3	3	5	72	61	+11	42	Advance to Playoffs and 2027–28 Champions Hockey League qualification
3	HC Ambrì-Piotta	22	10	3	2	7	70	66	+4	38	Advance to Playoffs
4	EV Zug	18	12	0	2	4	67	39	+28	38	Advance to Playoffs
5	Genève-Servette HC	23	9	3	3	8	60	74	−14	36	Advance to Playoffs
6	SCL Tigers	23	10	1	3	9	80	69	+11	35	Advance to Playoffs
7	HC Ajoie	23	7	5	2	9	69	73	−4	33	Advance to Play-in
8	HC Fribourg-Gottéron	22	8	2	3	9	66	54	+12	31	Advance to Play-in
9	HC Lugano	23	8	1	3	11	67	73	−6	29	Advance to Play-in
10	Lausanne HC	23	7	3	1	12	65	81	−16	28	Advance to Play-in
11	HC Davos	22	7	2	2	11	54	65	−11	27	
12	SC Rapperswil-Jona Lakers	23	6	2	3	12	60	79	−19	25	
13	EHC Biel	21	7	0	3	11	67	78	−11	24	Advance to Playouts
14	EHC Kloten	23	7	1	1	14	56	83	−27	24	Advance to Playouts

Updated to match(es) played on 22 November 2026. Source:
Rules for classification: 1) points per game 2) greater number of games played 3) greater number of away games played 4) head-to-head points

== Postseason ==
At the end of the regular season, the six teams with the most points advance to the playoffs, the next four advance to the play-ins for a chance to qualify to the playoffs. The two teams with the least point go to the playouts. The loser of the series has to face the winner of the Swiss League (SL) and are relegated to the SL if they lose (the winning team being promoted).

=== Play-in stage ===
Each round of the play-ins is played in two matches, one at each team's home arena, using aggregate scoring (the winner is defined by the total score of the two matches). The games are only played on regulation time (no overtime). If the total score at the end of regulation of the second match is even, endless overtime is played. The first game is played at the home arena of the team with the lowest regular season ranking.

In the first round, the seventh seed faces the eighth and the ninth faces the 10th. The winner of the match between the seventh and eighth qualifies for the playoffs. The loser faces the winner of the match between ninth and 10th in the second round. The winner of the second round qualifies for the playoffs. Of the two teams qualified, the one with the better regular season ranking faces the second seed in the first round of playoffs. The other team faces the first seed.

Round 1
7
8
9
10

Round 2
7
9

Final Seeds
No. 7 Seed
No. 8 Seed

=== Playoffs ===
The playoffs are played in a single elimination bracket, each round being a best-of-seven. The seeding is decided based on the regular season ranking. The teams play every other game at their home arena, the team with the higher regular season ranking getting the advantage for the first game. Pairings are reseeded after the first round.

Quarterfinals (best-of-7)
1
8
2
7
(Pairings are reseeded after the first round)
3
6
4
5

Semifinals (best-of-7)

Finals (best-of-7)

=== Playouts ===
The two teams in the NL with the least regular season points go to the Playouts. They play a seven-game series, the loser of which has to play against the winner of the Swiss League (SL). The loser of that series goes to the SL, and the winner to the NL.

Semifinal	Final
	1
13
14
