= SC Bern =

- Nickname: Bären (The Bears)
- City: Bern, Switzerland
- League: National League
- Founded: 1931
- Home arena: PostFinance Arena
- Colors
- CEO: Marc Lüthi
- General manager: Patrik Bärtschi
- Head coach: Serge Aubin
- Captain: Ramon Untersander
- Affiliates: EHC Visp
- Website: www.scb.ch

Schlittschuh Club Bern (Ice-skating Club Bern in English) is a professional ice hockey team based in Bern, Switzerland. The team competes in the National League (NL), the highest league in Switzerland. For the 18th year in a row, the club is the most attended ice hockey team in Europe for the 2018–19 regular season, averaging 16,290 spectators.

They are traditional rivals with HC Fribourg-Gottéron, EHC Biel, and the SCL Tigers.

== History ==
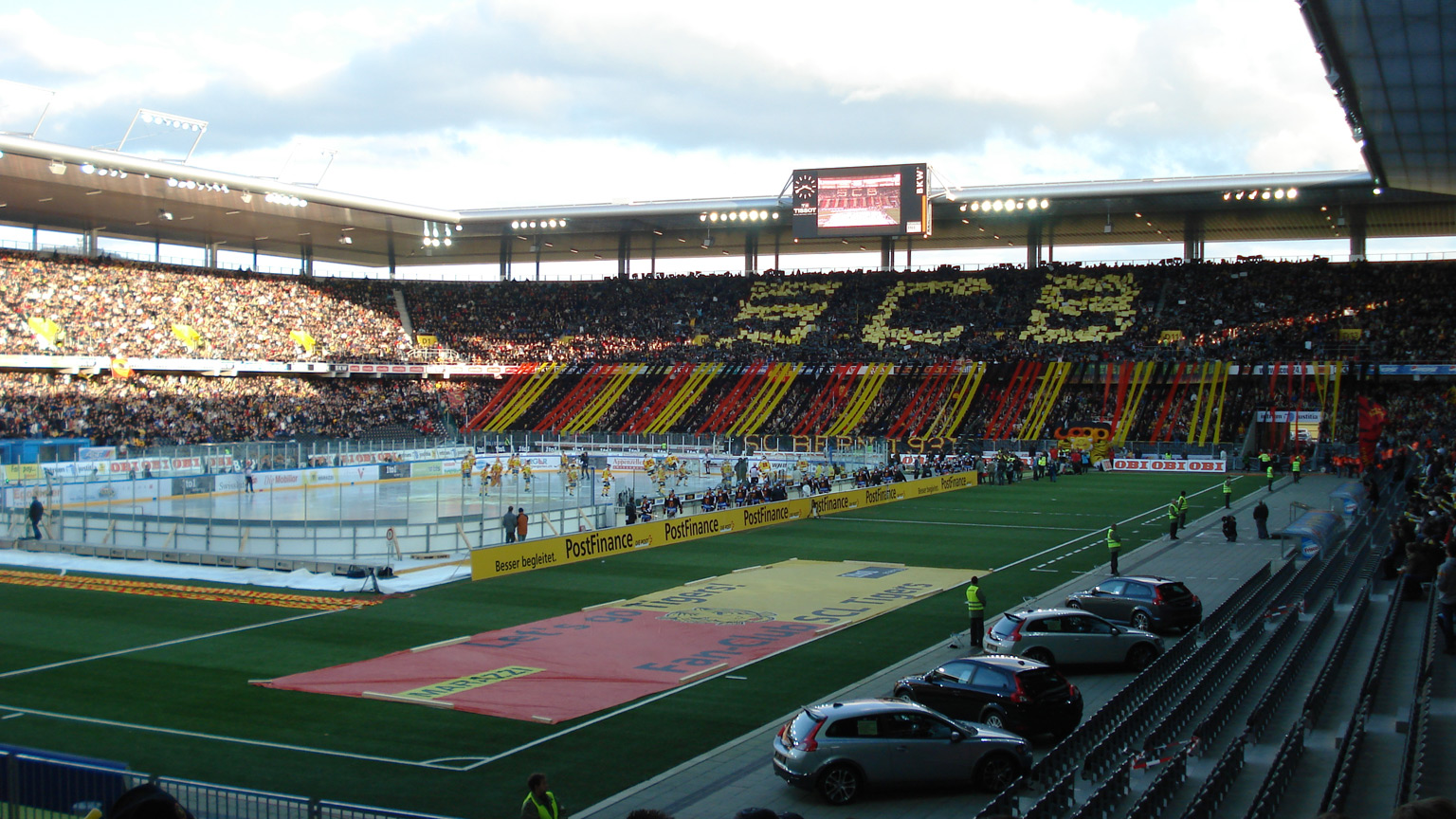
SC Bern versus SCL Tigers in an outdoor game 14 January 2007.

The ice hockey section of the Bern Sports Club, which was established on 3 November 1930, officially began playing on 1 January 1931.

Today, SC Bern is a highly popular team and regularly fills its home stadium, the PostFinance Arena, one of the largest ice hockey stadiums in Europe. In 2006, they set a new record among European clubs for average attendance, with an average of 15,994 in 22 home games. They have won the Swiss Championship thirteen times, with the most famous victory coming in 1989 over HC Lugano

During the 2004–05 NHL lockout, Daniel Brière, Dany Heatley, J. P. Dumont, Marc Savard, Henrik Tallinder, and Chris Clark played for SC Bern. Although, league rules allow only four players without Swiss passports to suit up in a single game.

After a disappointing run in the 2006 playoffs, the club replaced head coach Alpo Suhonen with John Van Boxmeer and general manager Roberto Triulzi with Sven Leuenberger. Leuenberger had previously played thirteen seasons of defence with the club, totaling 67 goals, 145 assists, and four national championships. His jersey number 16 is one of many that has been retired by SC Bern.

On 30 September 2008, SC Bern faced off against the National Hockey League's New York Rangers to celebrate one hundred years of ice hockey in Switzerland. Forty-nine years since the Rangers' last visit to Switzerland, the blueshirts beat the home team 8–1 in front of a sellout crowd. Despite the slanted score, SC Bern played a close game with a 2–0 score at the end of the second. Former Phoenix Coyotes' Canadian-born defenceman Travis Roche scored SC Bern's goal early in the third period, bringing the game to 2–1. SC Bern only allowed two even-strength goals, but could not withstand the Rangers' potent power play in the final frame (6-for-9). "We played for our pride tonight," said center Sébastien Bordeleau after the exhibition game. Christian Dubé wore the captain's "C" because Ivo Rüthemann was injured.

During the 2012 NHL lockout, Roman Josi, Mark Streit and John Tavares played for the SC Bern. Tavares quickly became the PostFinance Top Scorer tallying 42 points (17G, 25A) in 28 games.

During the 2013–14 season, Guy Boucher signed a contract as coach of the SC Bern for the current year and two more seasons. He has since been relieved from his duties, moving on to coach the Ottawa Senators, being replaced by former assistant and SC Bern player Lars Leuenberger, who guided the team to the championship in 2016. Leuenberger was then replaced by former Finnish national team coach Kari Jalonen prior to the 2016–17 season. Jalonen went on to win the NL title in his first year at the helm of the team.

On 1 October 2018, SC Bern played a friendly game against the New Jersey Devils of the National Hockey League (NHL), which featured their former player Nico Hischier who in 2017 became the first Swiss player to be drafted first overall in an NHL entry draft.

On 4 May 2026, it was announced that Serge Aubin would become the new head coach of SC Bern.

== Honors ==
=== Champions ===
- NL Championship (16): 1959, 1965, 1974, 1975, 1977, 1979, 1989, 1991, 1992, 1997, 2004, 2010, 2013, 2016, 2017, 2019
- SL Championship (3): 1958, 1969, 1972
- Swiss Cup (3): 1965, 2015, 2021
- European Cup appearances (10): 1965, 1974, 1975, 1977, 1979, 1989, 1991, 1992, 1996, 1997

== Players ==
=== Current roster ===
Updated 28 October 2026.

| No. | Nat | Player | Pos | S/G | Age | Acquired | Birthplace |
|---|---|---|---|---|---|---|---|
| 15 | (Finland) | Miro Aaltonen | F | L | 33 | 2025 | Joensuu, Finland |
| 81 | (Latvia) | Rodrigo Ābols | F | L | 30 | 2026 | Riga, Latvia |
| 64 | (Switzerland) | Mats Alge | LW | L | 23 | 2025 | Uznach, Swizerland |
| 34 | (Switzerland) | Nic Balestra | D | R | 21 | 2026 | |
| 57 | (Switzerland) | Davyd Barandun | D | L | 26 | 2026 | Sumy, Ukraine |
| 98 | (Austria) | Benjamin Baumgartner (A) | C | L | 26 | 2022 | Zell am See, Austria |
| 71 | (Sweden) | Emil Bemström | F | R | 27 | 2025 | Nyköping, Sweden |
| 4 | (Switzerland) | Rodwin Dionicio | D | L | 22 | 2026 | Newark, New Jersey, United States |
| 14 | (Switzerland) | Louis Füllemann | D | L | 22 | 2022 | Liebefeld, Switzerland |
| 43 | (Switzerland) | Alain Graf (A) | C | R | 21 | 2024 | Thun, Switzerland |
| 78 | (Switzerland) | Joel Grossniklaus | F | L | 20 | 2026 | Interlaken, Switzerland |
| 41 | (Switzerland) | Simon Kindschi | D | L | 30 | 2023 | Davos, Switzerland |
| 44 | (Switzerland) | Samuel Kreis | D | L | 32 | 2023 | Egnach, Switzerland |
| 23 | (Switzerland) | Marco Lehmann | C | L | 27 | 2022 | Lauperswil, Switzerland |
| 37 | (Sweden) | Anton Lindholm | D | L | 31 | 2024 | Skellefteå, Sweden |
| 8 | (Switzerland) | Marc Marchon (A) | C | L | 31 | 2024 | Vuisternens-en-Ogoz, Switzerland |
| 19 | (Finland) | Waltteri Merelä (C) | RW | R | 28 | 2024 | Ylöjärvi, Finland |
| 66 | (United States) | Sonny Milano | LW | L | 30 | 2026 | Massapequa, New York, United States |
| 5 | (Canada) | Ian Mitchell | D | R | 27 | 2026 | St. Albert, Alberta, Canada |
| 96 | (Switzerland) | Paul Mottard | C | L | 20 | 2026 | Geneva, Switzerland |
| 83 | (Switzerland) | Marco Müller | F | L | 32 | 2025 | Zuchwil, Switzerland |
| 25 | (Latvia) | Rolands Naglis | D | L | 19 | 2026 | Ogre, Latvia |
| 51 | (Switzerland) | Nils Rhyn | D | L | 21 | 2025 | Bern, Switzerland |
| 91 | (Switzerland) | Fabian Ritzmann | LW | L | 24 | 2022 | Scuol, Switzerland |
| 63 | (Switzerland) | Dario Rohrbach | RW | R | 28 | 2026 | Sursee, Switzerland |
| 10 | (Switzerland) | Tristan Scherwey | W | L | 35 | 2009 | Wünnewil-Flamatt, Switzerland |
| 88 | (Switzerland) | Thierry Schild | F | R | 21 | 2023 | Zollikofen, Switzerland |
| 50 | (Switzerland) | Christof von Burg | G | L | 25 | 2025 | Locarno, Switzerland |
| 33 | (Switzerland) | Sandro Zurkirchen | G | L | 36 | 2025 | Schwyz, Switzerland |

=== Honored members ===
- 0 René Kiener
- 6 Peter Stammbach, number retired on 1 December 2009
- 7 Martin Rauch
- 12 Roland Dellsberger
- 16 Sven Leuenberger
- 18 Renzo Holzer, number retired on 1 December 2009
- 22 Patrick Howald, number retired on 1 December 2009
- 31 Renato Tosio
- 32 Ivo Rüthemann, number retired 15 November 2014

=== NHL alumni ===
- (Canada) Bryan Lefley (1980–1982)
- (Canada) Claude Noël (1981–1982)
- (Canada) Peter Sullivan (1983–1984)
- (Canada) Gaston Therrien (1984–1986)
- (Canada) Kirk Bowman (1984–1988)
- (Finland) Reijo Ruotsalainen (1986–1987, 1988–1989, 1990–1992)
- (Finland) Risto Siltanen (1987–1988)
- (Canada) Alan Haworth (1988–1992)
- (Canada) Paul Boutilier (1989–1990)
- (Canada) Kevin LaVallee (1989–1990)
- (Canada) Marc Habscheid (1992–1993)
- (Canada) Dan Quinn (1993–1994)
- (Finland) Raimo Summanen (1993–1994)
- (Italy) Gaetano Orlando (1994–1998)
- (Finland) Ville Sirén (1995–1998)
- (Finland) Timo Jutila (1996–1997)
- (Canada) Daniel Marois (1996–1999)
- (United States) Mike Donnelly (1997–1998)
- (United States) David Sacco (1997–1998)
- (Ukraine) Alexander Godynyuk (1998–1999)
- (Canada) Dave McLlwain (1998–2000)
- (Sweden) Patrik Juhlin (1999–2005)
- (Sweden) Andreas Johansson (2000–2001)
- (Sweden) Fredrik Olausson (2000–2001)
- (Canada) Ryan Savoia (2000–2001)
- (Canada) Derek Armstrong (2001–2002)
- (Canada) Claude Vilgrain (2001–2002)
- (Switzerland) Thomas Ziegler (2001–2010)
- (Canada) Yves Sarault (2002–2005)
- (France) Sébastien Bordeleau (2002–2009)
- (Canada) Christian Dubé (2002–2011)
- (Canada) Sylvain Lefebvre (2003–2004)
- (United States) Rich Brennan (2004–2005)
- (Canada) Daniel Brière (2004–2005)
- (United States) Chris Clark (2004–2005)
- (Canada) Dany Heatley (2004–2005)
- (Canada) Marc Savard (2004–2005)
- (Sweden) Henrik Tallinder (2004–2005)
- (Canada) J. P. Dumont (2004–2005, 2011–2012)
- (Canada) Éric Perrin (2005–2006)
- (Canada) Pascal Trépanier (2005–2006)
- (Canada) Éric Landry (2006–2007)
- (Canada) Claude Lapointe (2006–2007)
- (Sweden) Christian Berglund (2006–2008)
- (Canada) Simon Gamache (2006–2011)
- (Switzerland) Roman Josi (2006–2010, 2012–2013)
- (Czech Republic) Patrik Štefan (2007)
- (Canada) Nathan Dempsey (2007–2008)
- (United States) Mark Mowers (2007–2008)
- (Canada) Ramzi Abid (2007–2009)
- (United States) Keith Carney (2008–2009)
- (Canada) Martin Gélinas (2008–2009)
- (Canada) Travis Roche (2008–2014)
- (Slovakia) Ľuboš Bartečko (2009–2010)
- (Canada) Lee Goren (2009–2011)
- (Canada) Brett McLean (2009–2011)
- (Canada) Jean-Pierre Vigier (2009–2012)
- (Switzerland) Joël Vermin (2009–2014)
- (Canada) Joel Kwiatkowski (2010–2012)
- (Canada) Geoff Kinrade (2011–2014)
- (Switzerland) Christoph Bertschy (2011–2015)
- (Canada) Byron Ritchie (2011–2017)
- (Czech Republic) Jaroslav Bednář (2012–2013)
- (Switzerland) Mark Streit (2012–2013)
- (Czech Republic) Petr Sýkora (2012–2013)
- (Canada) John Tavares (2012–2013)
- (Switzerland) Hnat Domenichelli (2013–2014)
- (Finland) Mikko Lehtonen (2013–2014)
- (Canada) Glen Metropolit (2013–2014)
- (Czech Republic) Rostislav Olesz (2013–2014)
- (Canada) Marc-André Gragnani (2014–2015)
- (Canada) Bud Holloway (2014–2015)
- (Finland) Jesse Joensuu (2014–2015)
- (Canada) Nolan Schaefer (2014–2015)
- (Canada) Chuck Kobasew (2014–2016)
- (Switzerland) Simon Moser (2014–present)
- (Finland) Sean Bergenheim (2015–2016)
- (Canada) Cory Conacher (2015–2016)
- (Switzerland) Timo Helbling (2015–2016)
- (Switzerland) Nico Hischier (2015–2016)
- (Canada) Derek Roy (2015–2016)
- (Canada) Trevor Smith (2015–2016)
- (Canada) Andrew Ebbett (2015–2020)
- (Canada) Aaron Gagnon (2016–2017)
- (Canada) Maxime Macenauer (2016–2017)
- (Canada) Maxim Noreau (2016–2018)
- (United States) Mark Arcobello (2016–2020)
- (United States) Jeremy Morin (2017–2018)
- (Finland) Mika Pyörälä (2017–2018)
- (Canada) Mason Raymond (2017–2018)
- (Switzerland) Gaëtan Haas (2017–2020)
- (Sweden) Adam Almquist (2018–2019)
- (Slovenia) Jan Muršak (2018–2020)
- (Canada) Christian Thomas (2020–2020)
- (Canada) Dustin Jeffrey (2020–present)
- (Finland) Waltteri Merelä (2024–present)

== See also ==
- Category:SC Bern players
- Category:SC Bern coaches
