= EHC Biel-Bienne =

EHC Biel
- City: Biel, Switzerland
- League: National League
- Founded: 1939
- Home arena: Tissot Arena
- Colors
- General manager: Martin Steinegger
- Head coach: Christian Dubé
- Captain: Gaëtan Haas
- Website: www.ehcb.ch

Franchise history
- 1939–47: EHC Biel/Bienne
- 1947–48: EHC Tornado Biel
- 1948–present: EHC Biel

EHC Biel-Bienne is a professional ice hockey club based in Biel/Bienne, Switzerland. The team competes in the National League (NL), the highest league in Switzerland. Since the city of Biel is bilingual, alongside the German name EHC Biel (abbreviated as EHCB) the team also has a French name, HC Bienne (abbreviated as HCB). The team plays its home games in the 6,521-seat Tissot Arena.

== History ==
EHC Biel played in lower Swiss ice hockey leagues until they got promoted in the second-tier Swiss League in 1960. In 1975 EHC Biel won the Swiss League-title and got promoted to the first level, the National League. During the 20 years between 1975 and 1995 the club won three national championships in 1978, 1981 and 1983 under three coaches (František Vanek, Ed Reigle, Kent Ruhnke). After the relegation in 1995 EHC Biel had to wait 13 years until their return to the NL. After three consecutive championship victories in the second-tier Swiss League, EHC Biel was reinstated into the NL, winning the promotion/relegation best of 7 series against EHC Basel 4–0 in 2008.

A strong local rivalry exists with the SCL Tigers, SC Bern, EHC Olten, and HC Ajoie. Games between these teams often attract sell-out crowds.

During the 2012–13 NHL lockout, Biel were strengthen by the acquisitions of NHL All-Stars Tyler Seguin and Patrick Kane. They were joined by future NHL players, goalkeeper Reto Berra and winger Nikolaj Ehlers.

== Honors ==
=== Champions ===
- NL Championship (3): 1978, 1981, 1983
- SL Championship (5): 1975, 2004, 2006, 2007, 2008

== Players ==
=== Current roster ===
Updated 29 October 2026.

No.	Nat	Player	Pos	S/G	Age	Acquired	Birthplace
52	(Switzerland)	Cédric Aeschbach	D	L	24	2026	Thun, Switzerland
24	(Sweden)	Lias Andersson	C	L	28	2024	Smögen, Sweden
14	(Switzerland)	Niklas Blessing	D	L	20	2024	
28	(Switzerland)	Leo Braillard	W	L	21	2025	La Chaux-de-Fonds, Switzerland
71	(Switzerland)	Yanik Burren	D	R	29	2024	Bern, Switzerland
17	(Switzerland)	Jérémie Bärtschi	RW	L	24	2019	
73	(Czech Republic)	Petr Čajka	F	L	25	2025	Kadaň, Czechia
13	(Switzerland)	Nolan Cattin	RW	R	20	2024	
98	(Switzerland)	Luca Christen	RW	R	28	2021	Langenthal, Switzerland
77	(Switzerland)	Robin Grossmann	D	L	39	2021	Dintikon, Switzerland
92	(Switzerland)	Gaëtan Haas (C)	C	R	34	2021	Biel, Switzerland
16	(Austria)	Fabio Hofer	RW	R	35	2020	Lustenau, Austria
75	(Russia)	Aleksandr Iakovenko	D	L	28	2021	Karaganda, Kazakhstan
19	(Switzerland)	Jonah Neuenschwander	F	L	17	2024	Biel-Bienne, Switzerland
60	(Sweden)	Viktor Östlund	G	L	32	2026	Stockholm, Sweden
25	(Finland)	Toni Rajala (A)	LW	L	35	2016	Parkano, Finland
15	(Switzerland)	Yanick Sablatnig	RW	R	27	2024	Rüderswil, Switzerland
35	(Finland)	Harri Säteri	G	L	36	2022	Toijala, Finland
1	(Switzerland)	Florian Scheu	G	L	19	2026	Hanoi, Vietnam
23	(Slovenia)	Mark Sever	W	L	21	2025	Jesenice, Slovenia
53	(Canada)	Jeff Skinner	F	L	34	2026	Markham, Ontario, Canada
9	(Sweden)	Victor Söderström	D	R	25	2026	Skutskär, Sweden
18	(Switzerland)	Yanick Stampfli	D	L	26	2020	Zuchwil, Switzerland
29	(Sweden)	Marcus Sylvegård	RW	R	27	2025	Gessie, Sweden
86	(Switzerland)	Dario Trutmann	D	R	34	2026	Zug, Switzerland
89	(Switzerland)	Joël Vermin	F	L	34	2026	Frauenkappelen, Switzerland
49	(Switzerland)	Miro Zryd	D	L	31	2024	Adelboden, Switzerland
61	(Austria)	Dominic Zwerger	LW	L	30	2026	Dornbirn, Austria

=== Notable alumni ===
- Jean-Jacques Aeschlimann
- Olivier Anken
- Mauro Beccarelli
- Gaetan Boucher
- Gino Cavallini
- Chris Chelios
- Gilles Dubois
- Daniel Dubuis
- Normand Dupont
- Heinz Ehlers
- Nikolaj Ehlers
- Rico Fata
- Pierre-Alain Flotiront
- René Furler
- Paul Gagné
- Gaston Gingras
- Richmond Gosselin
- Shawn Heaphy
- Jonas Hiller
- Barry Jenkins
- Ramil Juldashew
- Patrick Kane
- Willy Kohler
- Jakob Kölliker
- Francis Lardon
- Steve Latinovitch
- Marc Leuenberger
- Bob Lindberg
- Kevin Lötscher
- Urs Lott
- Serge Martel
- Serge Meyer
- Cyrill Pasche
- Guido Pfosi
- Dan Poulin
- Jörg Reber
- Michel Riesen
- Valeri Schirjajew
- Kevin Schläpfer
- Björn Schneider
- Sven Schmid
- Tyler Seguin
- Jiri Slegr
- Laurent Stehlin
- Martin Steinegger
- Alexandre Tremblay
- Marko Tuomainen
- Claude Vilgrain
- Marco Wegmüller
- Daniel Widmer
- Bernhard Wist
- Aldo Zenhäusern
