= Kevin Lotscher =

Swiss ice hockey player

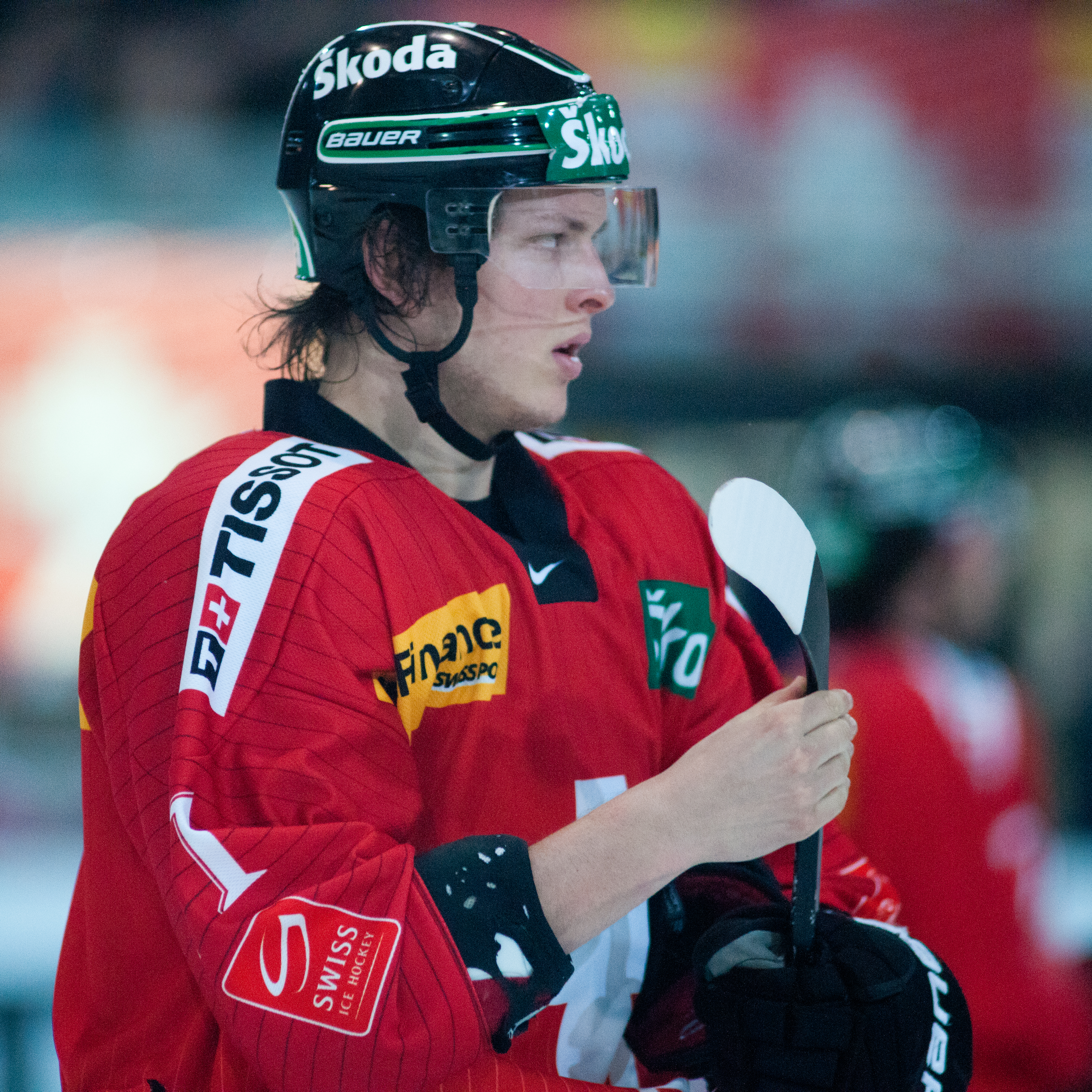
- Born: February 17, 1988 (age 37); Visp, Switzerland
- Height: 6 ft 3 in (191 cm)
- Weight: 201 lb (91 kg; 14 st 5 lb)
- Position: Forward
- Shoots: Right
- NLA team: EHC Biel
- National team: Switzerland
- NHL draft: Undrafted
- Playing career: 2005–present

Kevin Lotscher (born February 17, 1988) is a Swiss former professional ice hockey player who last played for EHC Biel in Switzerland's National League A.

He is participating at the 2011 IIHF World Championship as a member of the Switzerland men's national ice hockey team.

In the early hours of May 14, 2011, Kevin Lotscher was involved in a traffic accident in the Swiss town of Sierre, and suffered life-threatening head injuries. Police have reported that Lotscher was walking on the side of the road around 4:30 a.m. when he was hit head-on by a drunk driver. The driver of the car, a 19-year-old woman, tested positive for alcohol and was detained by police. This would eventually end his professional hockey career.
