= Julien Vauclair =

Swiss ice hockey player

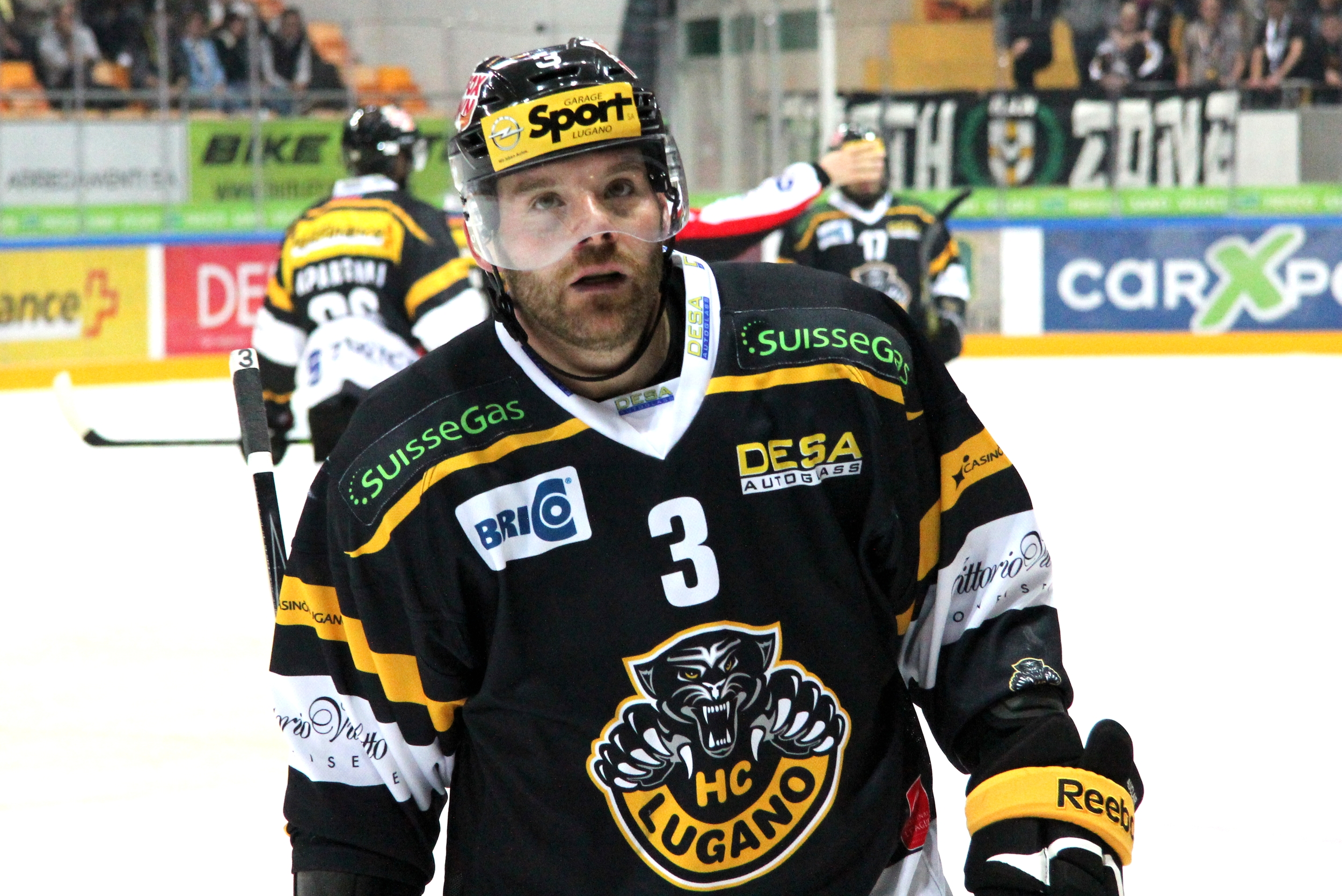
- Born: October 2, 1979 (age 46) Delémont, Switzerland
- Height: 6 ft 0 in (183 cm)
- Weight: 203 lb (92 kg; 14 st 7 lb)
- Position: Defence
- Shot: Left
- Played for: HC Ajoie; Grand Rapids Griffins; Binghamton Senators; Ottawa Senators; HC Lugano
- National team: Switzerland
- NHL draft: 74th overall, 1998; Ottawa Senators
- Playing career: 1996–2020

Julien Vauclair (born October 2, 1979) is a Swiss former professional ice hockey defenseman who spent most of his career with HC Lugano in the National League (NL). He made his professional debut in 1996 with HC Ajoie in Switzerland's second tier, Swiss League (SL). He spent three seasons within the Ottawa Senators organization of the National Hockey League (NHL). The Senators selected him 74th overall in the 1998 NHL entry draft.

== Playing career ==
As a youth, Vauclair played in the 1992 and 1993 Quebec International Pee-Wee Hockey Tournaments with a team from Switzerland.

Vauclair was drafted 74th overall by the Ottawa Senators of the National Hockey League (NHL) in the 1998 NHL entry draft and played one NHL game for the Senators in the 2003–04 NHL season. Vauclair has also played in the American Hockey League with the Grand Rapids Griffins and the Binghamton Senators. Vauclair began his professional career with Lugano in 1998, and he returned to them in 2004 and has played for them since.

On June 2, 2019, Vauclair agreed to a one-year contract extension with HC Lugano, stating that this would be his final season of professional hockey.

On March 26, 2020, Vauclair officially announced his retirement from professional hockey. Vauclair played all of his 791 regular season games (273 points) in the National League with HC Lugano, as well as 154 playoffs games (34 points). He won 2 NL titles with the team and was named twice to the NL Media Swiss All-Star Team. In addition to that, his jersey with the number 3 was to be retired by HC Lugano in the 2020–21 season, however with the interruption of the COVID-19 pandemic, his jersey was later retired in a game against HC Ajoie on 16 September 2022.

== International play ==
Vauclair has played internationally for Switzerland in three Olympics and nine World Championships, winning a silver medal in the 2013 World Championships. On January 6, 2014, Vauclair was named to Team Switzerland's official 2014 Winter Olympics roster.

== Career statistics ==
=== Regular season and playoffs ===
			Regular season					Playoffs
Season	Team	League	GP	G	A	Pts	PIM	GP	G	A	Pts	PIM
1995–96	HC Ajoie	SUI.3	20	4	10	14	—	—	—	—	—	—
1996–97	HC Ajoie	SUI.2	40	0	6	6	24	—	—	—	—	—
1997–98	HC Lugano	SUI U20	10	7	4	11	10	—	—	—	—	—
1997–98	HC Lugano	NDA	36	1	2	3	12	7	0	0	0	25
1998–99	HC Lugano	SUI U20	18	10	14	24	14	1	0	0	0	0
1998–99	HC Lugano	NDA	38	0	3	3	8	16	0	0	0	2
1999–00	HC Lugano	NLA	45	3	3	6	16	14	0	0	0	0
2000–01	HC Lugano	NLA	42	3	4	7	57	18	0	1	1	4
2001–02	Grand Rapids Griffins	AHL	71	5	14	19	18	4	0	1	1	4
2002–03	Binghamton Senators	AHL	67	6	16	22	30	14	0	1	1	8
2003–04	Binghamton Senators	AHL	78	9	30	39	39	2	0	0	0	0
2003–04	Ottawa Senators	NHL	1	0	0	0	2	—	—	—	—	—
2004–05	HC Lugano	NLA	42	4	7	11	28	3	0	0	0	2
2005–06	HC Lugano	NLA	31	6	6	12	32	17	2	4	6	12
2006–07	HC Lugano	NLA	39	7	9	16	50	5	1	1	2	10
2007–08	HC Lugano	NLA	49	10	21	31	34	—	—	—	—	—
2008–09	HC Lugano	NLA	50	10	35	45	56	7	1	1	2	6
2009–10	HC Lugano	NLA	35	13	15	28	64	4	0	1	1	10
2010–11	HC Lugano	NLA	40	12	17	29	38	—	—	—	—	—
2011–12	HC Lugano	NLA	41	4	8	12	28	6	1	1	2	6
2012–13	HC Lugano	NLA	47	7	9	16	24	7	1	2	3	4
2013–14	HC Lugano	NLA	31	3	8	11	18	5	0	1	1	2
2014–15	HC Lugano	NLA	38	6	7	13	30	6	0	1	1	6
2015–16	HC Lugano	NLA	42	1	7	8	53	12	2	2	4	10
2016–17	HC Lugano	NLA	27	1	9	10	22	6	4	0	4	0
2017–18	HC Lugano	NL	38	5	7	12	16	14	1	3	4	4
2018–19	HC Lugano	NL	44	4	6	10	24	3	0	0	0	2
2019–20	HC Lugano	NL	36	0	0	0	22	—	—	—	—	—
NL totals			791	100	173	273	632	150	13	17	30	105
AHL totals			216	20	60	80	87	20	0	2	2	12
NHL totals			1	0	0	0	2	—	—	—	—	—

=== International ===
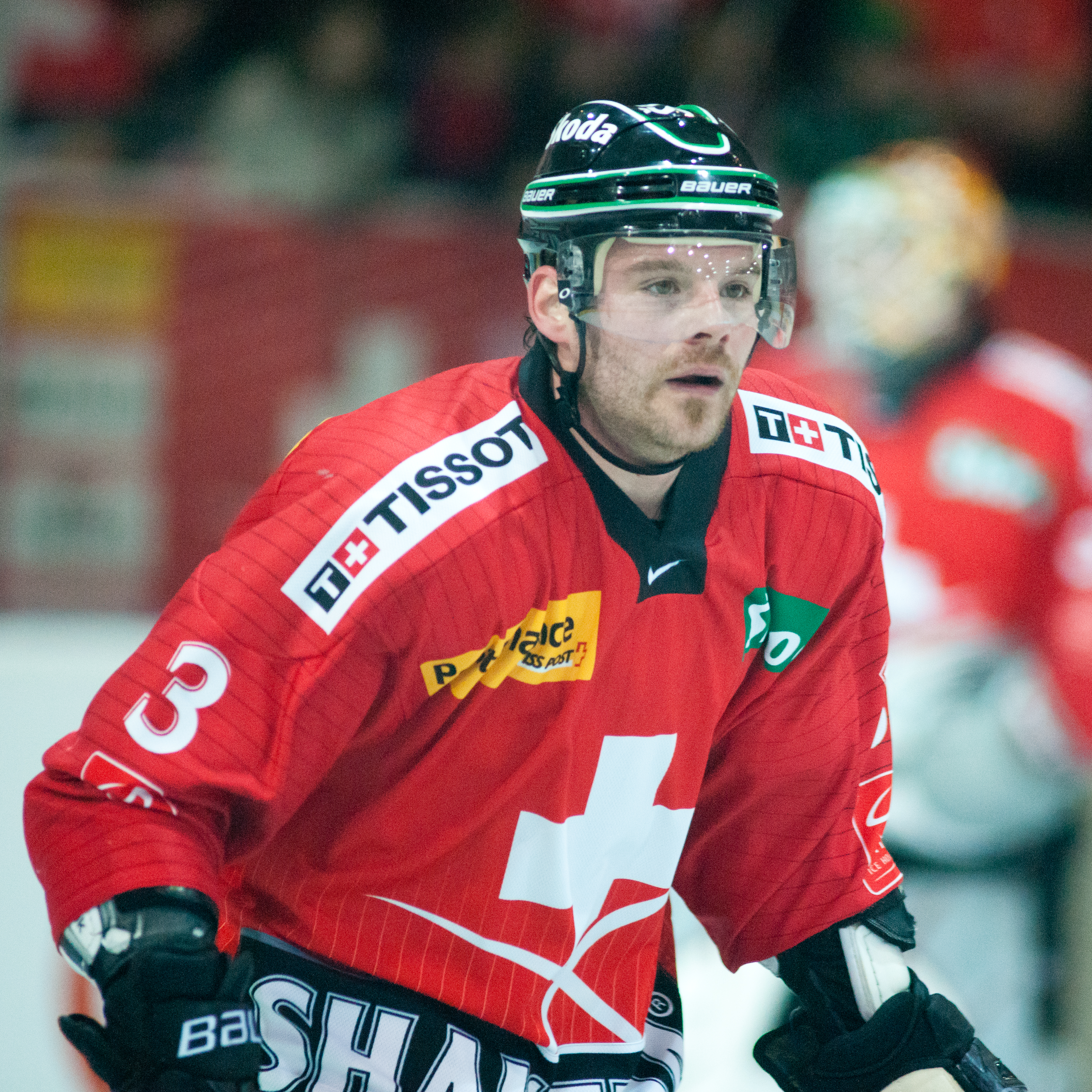

Medal record

Ice hockey

Representing Switzerland

World Championships
Silver medal – second place	2013 Sweden/Finland	

World Junior Championships
Bronze medal – third place	1998 Finland	

Year	Team	Event	GP	G	A	Pts	PIM
1997	Switzerland	EJC18	6	1	0	1	4
1998	Switzerland	WJC	7	1	2	3	12
1999	Switzerland	WJC	6	1	1	2	6
1999	Switzerland	WC	6	0	0	0	2
2000	Switzerland	WC	7	0	0	0	0
2001	Switzerland	WC	6	1	0	1	27
2002	Switzerland	OLY	4	1	0	1	2
2002	Switzerland	WC	6	0	2	2	2
2004	Switzerland	WC	5	0	0	0	16
2005	Switzerland	WC	7	0	0	0	10
2006	Switzerland	OLY	6	0	0	0	6
2006	Switzerland	WC	6	0	0	0	4
2007	Switzerland	WC	7	0	0	0	4
2008	Switzerland	WC	7	1	1	2	4
2010	Switzerland	WC	7	1	1	2	0
2011	Switzerland	WC	6	1	1	2	2
2013	Switzerland	WC	10	0	3	3	2
2014	Switzerland	OLY	4	0	0	0	2
Junior totals			19	3	3	6	22
Senior totals			88	5	8	13	81

== Awards ==
- 2004 AHL All-Star Game
- 2013 World Championships All-Star Team

== See also ==
- List of players who played only one game in the NHL
