= SC Rapperswil-Jona Lakers =

- City: Rapperswil, Switzerland
- League: National League
- Founded: 1945
- Home arena: St. Galler Kantonalbank Arena
- Colors
- General manager: Claudio Cadonau
- Head coach: Johan Lundskog
- Captain: Jacob Larsson
- Affiliates: EHC Winterthur
- Website: www.lakers.ch

Franchise history
- 1945–2005: SC Rapperswil-Jona
- 2005–2015: Rapperswil-Jona Lakers
- 2015–present: SC Rapperswil-Jona Lakers

The SC Rapperswil-Jona Lakers are a professional ice hockey club based in Rapperswil, Switzerland. The team competes in the National League (NL), the highest league in Switzerland.

== History ==
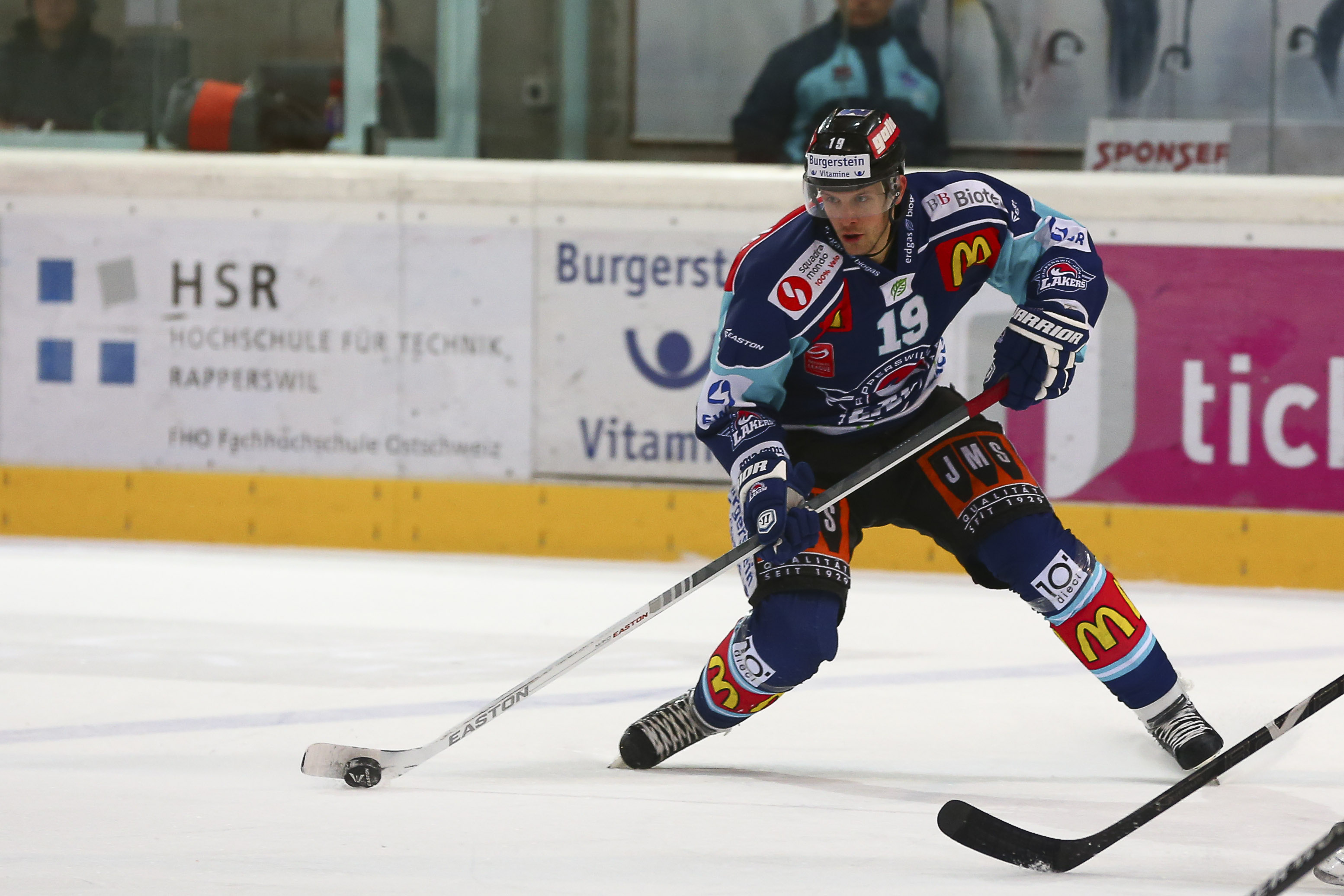
Jason Spezza played for the Lakers during the NHL lockout in 2012–13.

The Lakers were founded in 1945 and were known as SC Rapperswil-Jona until 2005, when the club changed its name to Rapperswil-Jona Lakers and then again changed their name to SC Rapperswil-Jona Lakers in 2015. They play their home games at St. Galler Kantonalbank Arena. NHL veteran Doug Gilmour skated for the Lakers during the NHL lockout-shortened season in 1994.

The Lakers had survived relegation in every NLA season since last making the playoffs in 2007–08 until the 2014–15 season, when they were swept by the SCL Tigers in the promotion/relegation round. They returned to the Swiss League for the 2015–16 season.

In 2017–18 season, the Lakers claimed the Swiss Cup, while also finishing victorious in the Swiss League Championship against EHC Olten and the promotion round against EHC Kloten marking their return to the National League after three years in the minor leagues.

== Honors ==
=== Champions ===
- Swiss League Championship (2): 1994, 2018
- Swiss Cup Championship (1): 2018

== Players ==
=== Current roster ===
Updated 10 November 2026.

No.	Nat	Player	Pos	S/G	Age	Acquired	Birthplace
28	(Switzerland)	Yannick-Lennard Albrecht	C	L	32	2021	Visp, Switzerland
32	(Switzerland)	Robin Bisig	D	R	21	2024	
7	(Switzerland)	Luca Capaul	D	L	27	2023	Uznach, Switzerland
14	(Switzerland)	Marc Diethelm	LW	L	21	2025	Rapperswil, Switzerland
24	(Switzerland)	Mauro Dufner	D	L	31	2025	Frauenfeld, Switzerland
23	(Switzerland)	Nico Dünner (C)	C	L	32	2019	Emmenbrücke, Switzerland
13	(Switzerland)	Janis Embacher	C	R	21	2023	Rapperswil, Switzerland
16	(Canada)	Tanner Fritz (A)	C	R	35	2024	Grande Prairie, Alberta, Canada
69	(Switzerland)	Marlon Graf	F	R	23	2025	Wettingen, Switzerland
68	(Switzerland)	Fabrice Herzog	W	L	31	2026	Frauenfeld, Switzerland
33	(Switzerland)	Valentin Hofer	RW	R	24	2024	Zug, Switzerland
47	(Switzerland)	Jan Hornecker	LW	L	22	2024	Grüt, Switzerland
17	(Switzerland)	Igor Jelovac	D	L	31	2024	Villars-sur-Ollon, Switzerland
71	(Denmark)	Nicklas Jensen	RW	L	33	2022	Herning, Denmark
12	(United States)	Kevin Labanc	W	R	30	2026	Staten Island, New York, United States
89	(Switzerland)	Dominic Lammer	RW	L	34	2021	Zürich, Switzerland
4	(Sweden)	Jacob Larsson (A)	D	L	29	2024	Ljungby, Sweden
11	(Switzerland)	Fabian Maier (A)	D	L	35	2016	Thurgau, Switzerland
95	(Switzerland)	Tyler Moy (A)	C	R	31	2022	San Diego, California, United States
60	(Switzerland)	Melvin Nyffeler	G	L	31	2017	Volketswil, Switzerland
20	(Sweden)	Lawrence Pilut	D	L	30	2025	Tingsryd, Sweden
74	(Latvia)	Ivars Punnenovs	G	L	32	2024	Riga, Latvia
64	(Switzerland)	Benjamin Quinn	D	R	22	2024	Toronto, Ontario, Canada
49	(Sweden)	Victor Rask	C	L	33	2023	Leksand, Sweden
15	(Switzerland)	Flavio Sauser	D	L	19	2026	
77	(Italy)	Alessandro Segafredo	RW	L	22	2026	Asiago, Italy
29	(Switzerland)	Daniil Ustinkov	D	L	20	2026	
72	(Switzerland)	Gian-Marco Wetter	C	L	26	2019	Appenzell, Switzerland
94	(Switzerland)	Sandro Zangger	RW	R	32	2021	Jona, Switzerland
