= HC Ajoie =

- City: Porrentruy, Switzerland
- League: National League
- Founded: 1973
- Home arena: Raiffeisen Arena (capacity 5,366)
- Colors
- General manager: (Switzerland) Julien Vauclair
- Head coach: (Finland) Ville Peltonen
- Captain: (Finland) Anttoni Honka
- Website: hc-ajoie.ch

Franchise history
- 1973–present: HC Ajoie

HC Ajoie is a professional ice hockey team based in Porrentruy, Switzerland. The team competes in the National League (NL), the highest league in Switzerland. It was founded in 1973 and plays its home game in the Raiffeisen Arena.

HC Ajoie has won three Swiss League (SL) Championships – in 1992, 2016 and 2021.

== History ==
On 2 February 2020 the team won the 2020 Swiss Cup, beating National League (NL) team HC Davos 7–3.

On 28 April 2021 HC Ajoie defeated EHC Kloten in game 6 of the Swiss League (SL) final and won the series 4–2 to be crowned SL champion. As a result, the team gained automatic promotion to the National League for the 2021/22 season.

On 28 July 2021 the team revealed its new logo, featuring three stars to honor their three SL titles.

== Players ==
=== Current roster ===
Updated 27 October 2026.

No.	Nat	Player	Pos	S/G	Age	Acquired	Birthplace
91	(Switzerland)	Yonas Berthoud	D	L	26	2025	Monthey, Switzerland
23	(Canada)	Stefano Bottini	W	L	24	2026	Lugano, Switzerland
21	(United States)	Logan Brown	F	L	28	2026	Raleigh, North Carolina, United States
7	(Canada)	Daniel Carr	W	L	35	2026	Sherwood Park, Alberta, Canada
73	(Switzerland)	Christophe Cavalleri	C	L	24	2025	Genève, Switzerland
15	(Switzerland)	Gael Christe	D	L	22	2025	Porrentruy, Switzerland
11	(Switzerland)	Livio Christen	F	L	21	2026	Wynigen, Switzerland
20	(Canada)	Cole Cormier	F	L	24	2025	Düsseldorf, Germany
8	(Canada)	Philip-Michaël Devos (A)	C	L	36	2019	Sorel-Tracy, Quebec, Canada
86	(Switzerland)	Nolan Diem	C	R	33	2026	Herisau, Switzerland
26	(Switzerland)	Kevin Fey	D	L	35	2023	Bern, Switzerland
	(Switzerland)	Lorin Froidevaux	RW	L	21	2026	Delémont, Switzerland
54	(Switzerland)	Lilian Garessus	C	L	23	2022	Porrentruy, Switzerland
61	(Switzerland)	Jeremi Gerber (A)	W	L	26	2026	Langnau im Emmental, Switzerland
	(Switzerland)	Titouan Girardin	F	L	21	2026	Porrentruy, Switzerland
	(Switzerland)	Ludovic Hauser	G	L	21	2026	Bösingen, Switzerland
3	(Finland)	Anttoni Honka (C)	D	R	26	2024	Jyväskylä, Finland
60	(Finland)	Julius Honka	D	R	30	2026	Jyväskylä, Finland
41	(Switzerland)	Tim Horak	D	L	21	2026	Nyon, Switzerland
16	(Canada)	Matthew Kellenberger	D	R	27	2026	Toronto, Ontario, Canada
30	(France)	Antoine Keller	G	L	22	2025	Dijon, France
55	(Switzerland)	Thibault Martin	D	R	21	2026	Lausanne, Switzerland
71	(Finland)	Julius Nättinen	C	L	29	2024	Jyväskylä, Finland
29	(Switzerland)	Noah Patenaude	G	L	23	2023	Neuchâtel, Switzerland
2	(Switzerland)	Valentin Pilet	D	L	29	2022	Yverdon-les-Bains, Switzerland
13	(Switzerland)	Louis Robin	RW	L	23	2024	Yverdon-les-Bains, Switzerland
17	(Latvia)	Deniss Smirnovs	C	L	27	2026	Riga, Latvia
78	(Switzerland)	Kyen Sopa	RW	L	26	2023	Flawil, Switzerland
27	(Finland)	Kristian Tanus (A)	F	L	26	2026	Tampere, Finland
25	(Switzerland)	Noé Tarchini	C	L	20	2026	Delémont, Switzerland
32	(Finland)	Jerry Turkulainen	RW	R	28	2024	Mikkeli, Finland
19	(Canada)	Jeremy Wick (A)	RW	R	37	2025	Grand Valley, Ontario, Canada
1	(Switzerland)	Tim Wolf	G	L	34	2026	Zürich, Switzerland
58	(Canada)	Jesse Zgraggen (A)	D	L	33	2026	Lethbridge, Alberta, Canada
