= SCL Tigers =

Swiss ice hockey club

- City: Langnau im Emmental, Switzerland
- League: National League
- Founded: 1946
- Home arena: Emmental Versicherung Arena
- Colours
- Owner: Peter Jakob
- General manager: Simon Laager
- Head coach: Thierry Paterlini
- Captain: Harri Pesonen
- Affiliates: EHC Chur
- Website: Official website

Franchise history
- 1946–1999: Schlittschuh Club Langnau
- 1999–present: SCL Tigers

The SC Langnau Tigers is a professional ice hockey team based in Langnau im Emmental, Switzerland. The team competes in the National League (NL), the highest league in Switzerland. The team plays its home games in the 6,050-seat Emmental Versicherung Arena.

== History ==
Originally formed as the Ice skating club Langnau, the team was founded on 30 January 1946. The 1948–49 season started in the summer due to the planing on the grounds of the Napro, where the ice rink was to be built. The ice rink began operation on 26 December 1948. SC Langnau, who had not yet completed any championship games, secured the "Begert Cup". Nine out of 16 games were won. The game against Rotblau Bern was attended by over 1000 spectators.

SC Langnau participated for the first time within the Swiss Championship, starting in the lowest league stage of the Swiss ice hockey. Opponents in the 1949–50 season were Roggwil, Olten, Münsingen and the second team of Red Blue Bern of the Serie B. In the season 1950–51, SC Langnau took part in the league operation of Serie B, Group 6 Central Switzerland. Langnau was group winner for the first time, but lost in the final against Bern. Langnau won the Cantonal Cup of the Serie B. In that season, the team completed a total of 23 games, including 16 at home.

The SCL Tigers, promoted to the NLA in 1998, are the successor club of the Schlittschuh-Club Langnau (SCL), which was outsourced to SCL Tigers AG in 1999 under the direction of President René Zeh. Zeh became the first chairman of the board. The club's club logo comes from the long-standing main sponsor, the long-established traditional company "Tiger Käse AG" (since 2004 " Emmi Fondue AG"), which has been sponsoring the club with its "Tiger" brand since the 1970s.

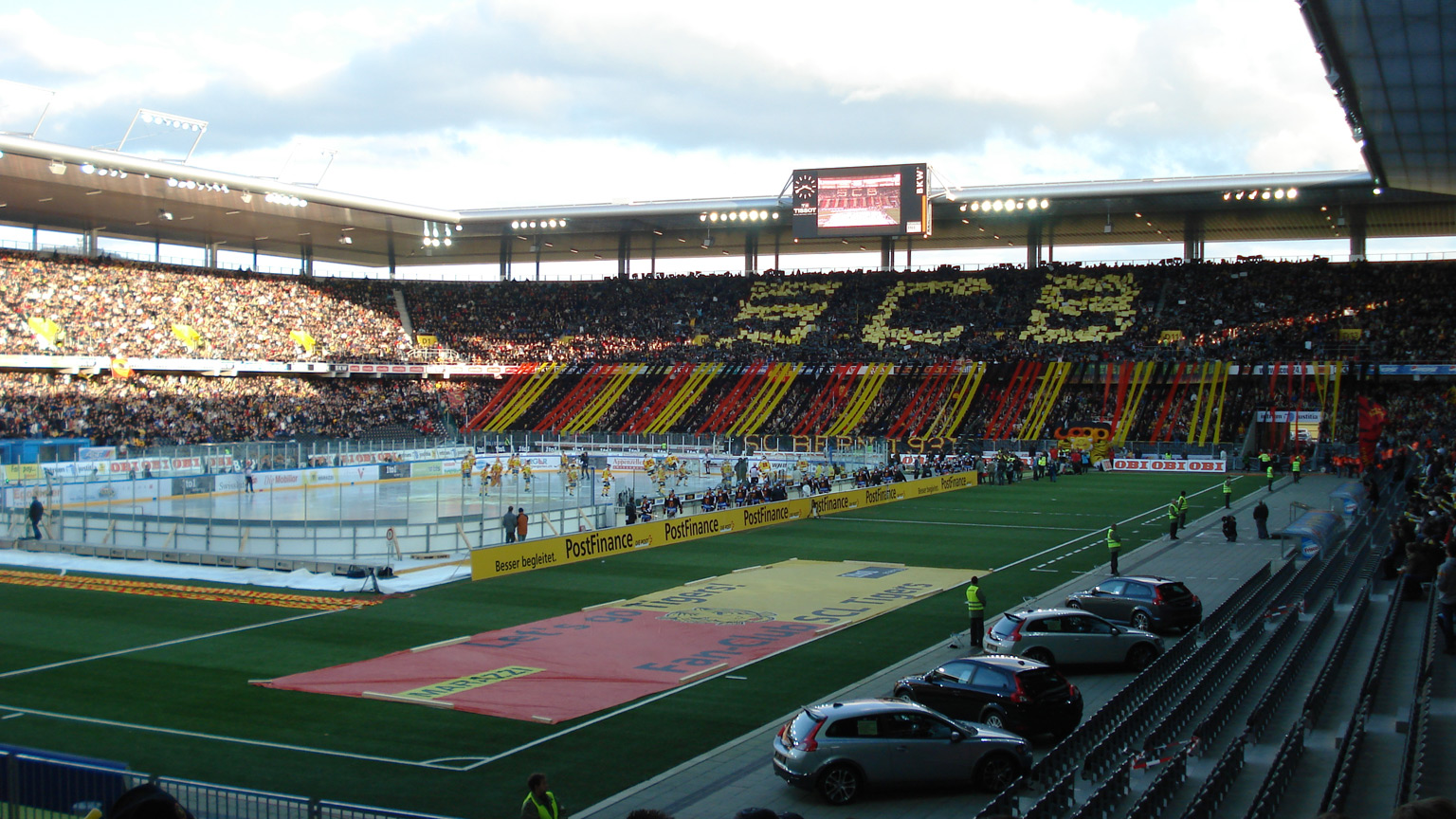
SCL Tigers versus SC Bern in an outdoor game on January 14, 2007

In October 2001, businessman Ruedi Soltermann took over Zeh's Presidency to lead SCL. In the summer of 2002, the club confirmed to have a debt amount of more than one million francs with the financial difficulties plaguing the club in the following years.

At the beginning of February 2005, Armin Müller was removed from the Board of Directors. According to the SCL, Müller, who was responsible for sponsorship, promised advertising revenues of nearly 1.3 million francs for the 2004–05 season, of which only a fraction arrived. The SCL Tigers announced that they would file charges for document forgery and misleading management. With SCL's long standing economical trouble's, an initiative "Save the Tigers" was founded in July 2009 with entrepreneur, Peter Jakob. In September 2009, Jakob became the President to the board of directors of SCL Tigers AG, and over the following years added financial stability to the Tigers and erasing their debts.

After their initial promotion in 1998, they played in Switzerland's top hockey level for 15 years. At the end of the 2012–2013 NLA season, they were defeated in the promotion/relegation games by Lausanne HC and were relegated to the National League B. SCL Tigers became the champions of the 2014–15 NLB season and gained the right to play against the worst team of 2014–15 NLA season in the promotion/relegation round. They returned to National League A for the 2015–2016 season after they defeated the Rapperswil-Jona Lakers in four games. Langnau was the eighth most attended team in the NLA for the 2015–16 season, averaging 5,868 (98%).

== Honors ==
=== Champions ===
- NL Championship (1): 1976
- SL Championship (5): 1934, 1989, 1957, 1999, 2015

=== Runners-up ===
- NL Championship (3): 1970, 1977, 1978

== Players ==
=== Current roster ===
Updated 10 November 2026.

No.	Nat	Player	Pos	S/G	Age	Acquired	Birthplace
62	(Switzerland)	Mike Aeschlimann	F	R	19	2025	Uster, Switzerland
28	(Switzerland)	Dario Allenspach	C	L	24	2024	Herisau, Switzerland
88	(Switzerland)	Jerome Bachofner	LW	L	30	2025	Dübendorf, Switzerland
42	(Switzerland)	Phil Baltisberger	D	L	30	2024	Zofingen, Switzerland
2	(Switzerland)	Simon Bär	D	L	19	2025	Schaffhausen, Switzerland
11	(Finland)	Hannes Björninen	C	L	31	2025	Lahti, Finland
39	(Switzerland)	Luca Boltshauser	G	L	33	2022	Zürich, Switzerland
54	(Sweden)	Jonathan Dahlén	LW	L	28	2026	Östersund, Sweden
25	(Switzerland)	Nando Eggenberger	W	L	27	2026	Chur, Switzerland
72	(Switzerland)	Samuel Erni	D	L	35	2017	Frauenfeld, Switzerland
21	(Switzerland)	Bastian Guggenheim	D	L	24	2020	Bern, Switzerland
27	(Finland)	Santtu Kinnunen	D	R	27	2025	Lahti, Finland
13	(Latvia)	Oskars Lapinskis	F	L	24	2021	Riga, Latvia
6	(Switzerland)	Nik Lehmann	D	L	19	2025	Konolfingen, Switzerland
8	(Finland)	Saku Mäenalanen	F	L	24	2023	Tornio, Finland
15	(Switzerland)	Tim Mathys	D	L	21	2024	Huttwil, Switzerland
4	(Switzerland)	Gian Meier	D	R	20	2026	Zürich, Switzerland
24	(Switzerland)	Noah Meier	D	L	24	2023	
91	(Switzerland)	Robin Meyer	G	L	26	2026	Baar, Switzerland
36	(France)	Martin Neckar	G	L	21	2025	Dijon, France
37	(Switzerland)	Arno Nussbaumer	D	L	24	2026	Seewis, Switzerland
20	(Sweden)	André Petersson	RW	R	36	2025	Olofström, Sweden
94	(Switzerland)	Patrick Petrini	F	R	24	2021	
14	(Sweden)	Emil Pettersson	F	L	32	2026	Sundsvall, Sweden
50	(Finland)	Juuso Riikola	D	L	33	2023	Joensuu, Finland
22	(Switzerland)	Joel Salzgeber	C	L	25	2020	
40	(Switzerland)	Flavio Schmutz (A)	C	L	32	2020	Andwil, Switzerland
71	(Switzerland)	Julian Schmutz	C	R	32	2023	Bern, Switzerland
64	(Switzerland)	Matteo Wagner	LW	L	21	2025	Bottmingen, Switzerland
77	(Switzerland)	Loris Wey	F	R	20	2026	Cham, Switzerland

=== Honored members ===
SCL Tigers retired numbers
No.	Player	Position	Career	No. retirement
12	Todd Elik	C	1998–2000, 2002–2009	–
15	Markus Graf	F	1977–1983	–
17	Daniel Aegerter	D	1992–2008	–
26	Martin Gerber	G	1994–2001, 2004–2005	–
44	Walter Gerber	F	1990–1991, 1994–1998	–
