= HC Lugano =

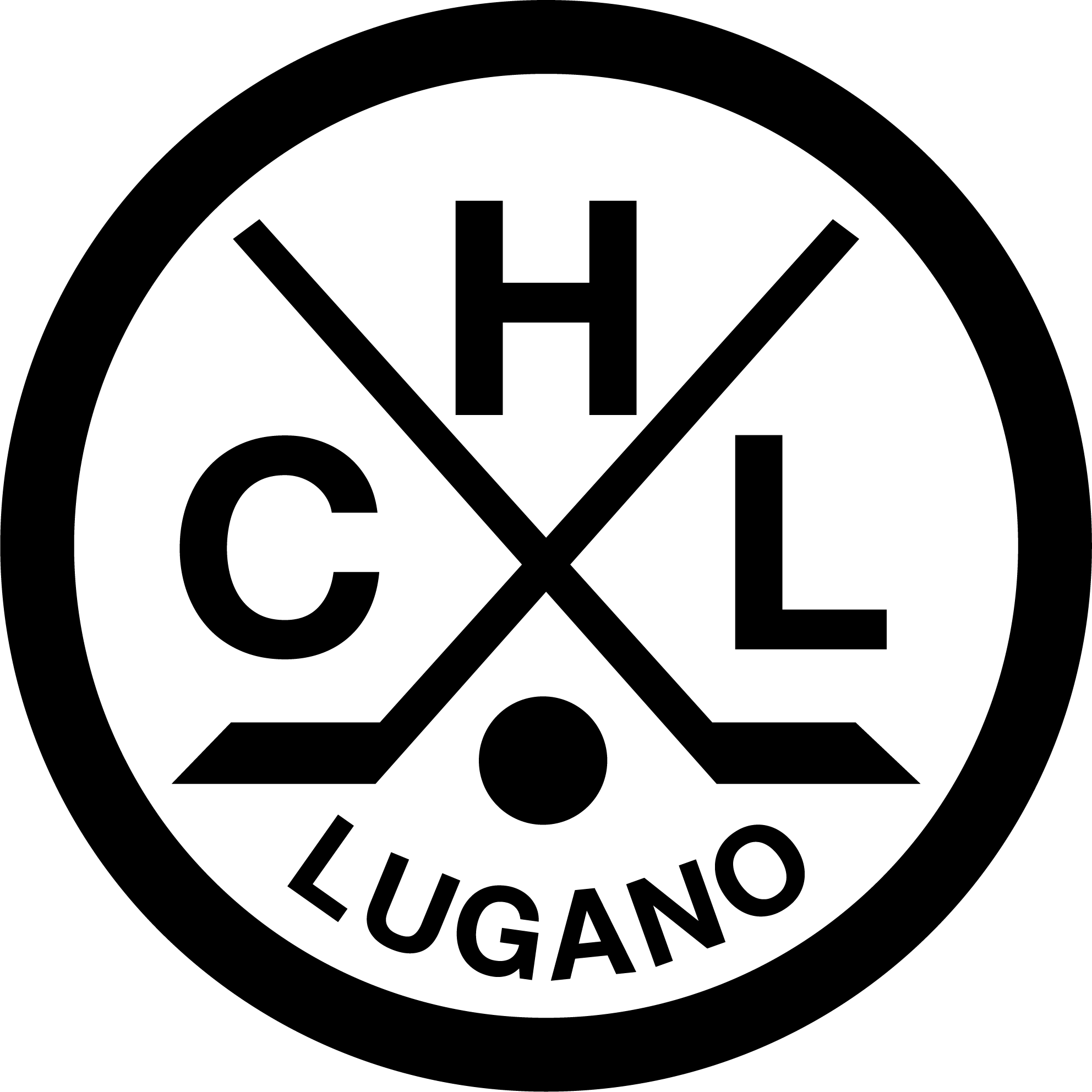
- City: Lugano, Switzerland
- League: National League: NL: 1999–present; NDA: 1970–1972, 1981–1999; NDB: 1963–1970, 1972–1981
- Founded: 1941
- Home arena: Cornèr Arena
- Colors
- Owner: Vicky Mantegazza
- General manager: Hnat Domenichelli
- Head coach: Luca Gianinazzi
- Captain: Mark Arcobello
- Affiliates: GDT Bellinzona Snakes
- Website: Official website

Franchise history
- 1941–present: Hockey Club Lugano

Hockey Club Lugano, often abbreviated to HC Lugano or HCL, is a professional ice hockey club based in Lugano, Switzerland. The team competes in the National League (NL), the highest league in Switzerland. It has won seven Swiss championships.

== History ==
The founding of HC Lugano took place on 11 February 1941, when they participated on Muzzano Lake their first games against Ambrì, Muzzano, Massagno and Paradiso. On 1 December 1957, the first artificial ice rink was opened, at the Pista La Resega. Among those present was also the man who, 30 years later, was to take HC Lugano to the top of Swiss and international hockey: Geo Mantegazza, an engineer by profession, who had done the static calculations of the Resega and thus the first contacts had with the family earning the club the nickname of the "Bianconeri" acknowledging their Italian speaking heritage.

In 1963–64, Lugano rose to the National League B, most notably through the contributions of defender Elwyn Friedrich and Forward Roland Bernasconi, both national players and Swiss champions with Villars. In the 1970–71 season, the Bianconeri's promotion to the tope flight National League A was realised for the first time in franchise history, playing two seasons before returning to the NLB.

In the 1981–82 season Lugano returned, together with Ambrì, back in the NLA. In the 1982–83 season, Mantegazza hired Swedish coach John Slettvoll, who won numerous championships in his tenure.

== Venue ==
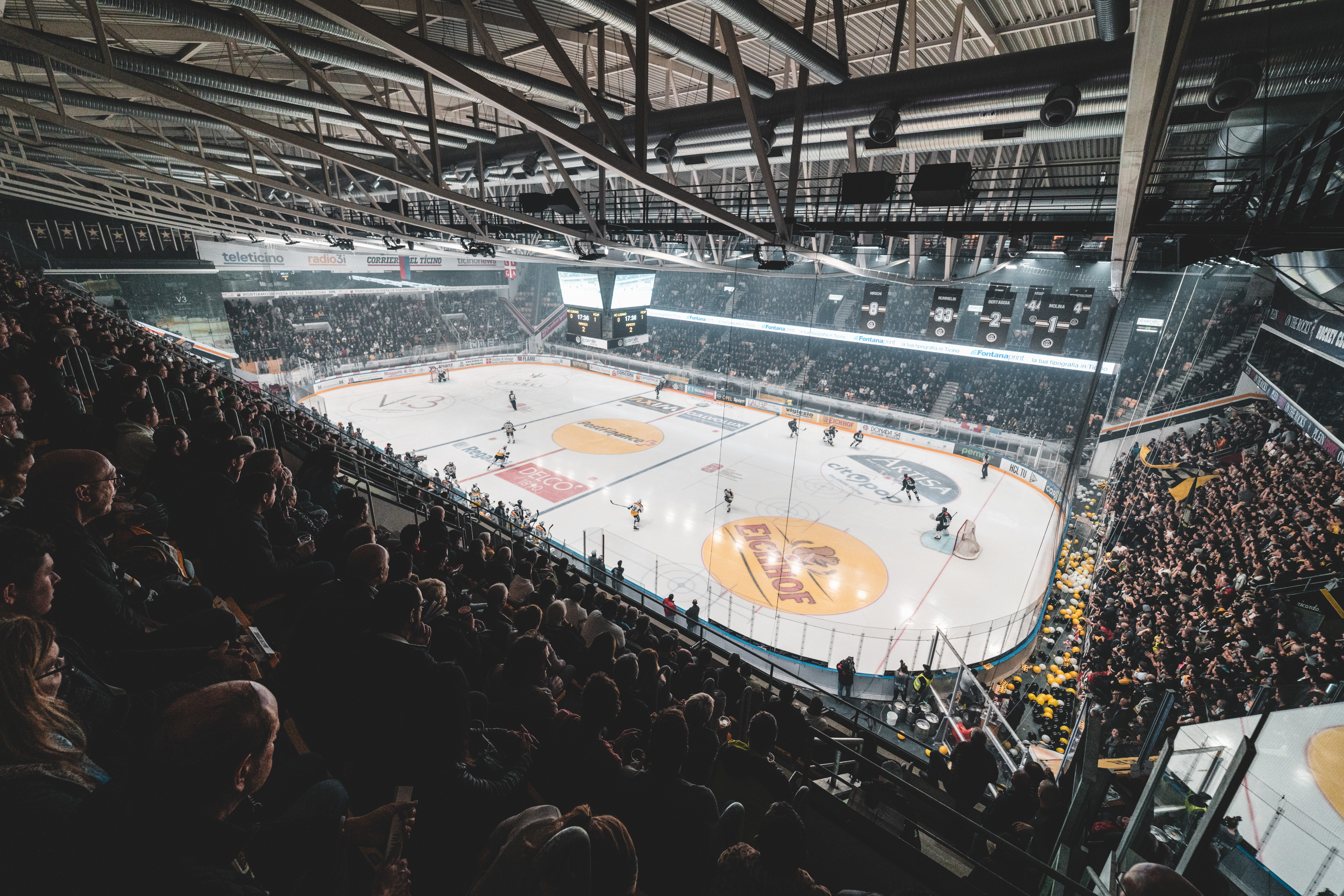
Internal view of the Lugano hockey arena Resega.

The Pista La Resega hockey arena in Lugano is primarily used for ice hockey and is the home arena of HC Lugano, HC Lugano-Ceresio and HC Porza. It was built in 1995, after the demolition of the previous one, and can hold 8,000 people.

== Honors ==
=== Champions ===
- NL Championship (7): 1986, 1987, 1988, 1990, 1999, 2003, 2006
- SL Championship (1): 1982

=== Runners-up ===
- NL Championship (8): 1985, 1989, 1991, 2000, 2001, 2004, 2016, 2018
- Spengler Cup (3): 1991, 2015, 2016

== Season-by-season records ==
Season	Result
2014–15	3rd Place in Regular Season; Quarterfinal playoff; Eighth-finalist in Swiss Cup
2015–16	5th Place in Regular Season; Final playoff; Finalist Spengler Cup; Eighth-finalist in Swiss Cup
2016–17	7th Place in Regular Season; Semi-final playoff; Finalist Spengler Cup; Round of 16 Champions Hockey League; Eighth-finalist in Swiss Cup
2017–18	4th Place in Regular Season; Final playoff
2018–19	7th Place in Regular Season; Quarterfinal playoff; Quarterfinal Champions Hockey League

== Players ==
=== Current roster ===
Updated 27 October 2026.

No.	Nat	Player	Pos	S/G	Age	Acquired	Birthplace
26	(Switzerland)	David Aebischer	D	R	26	2024	Heitenried, Switzerland
22	(Switzerland)	Santeri Alatalo (A)	D	L	36	2021	Tampere, Finland
29	(Switzerland)	Alessio Beglieri	G	L	22	2023	Biel-Bienne, Switzerland
10	(Switzerland)	Alessio Bertaggia	W	L	33	2025	Lugano, Switzerland
14	(Switzerland)	Lorenzo Canonica	C	L	23	2023	Lugano, Switzerland
65	(Latvia)	Harijs Cjunskis	D	L	20	2026	Mārupe, Latvia
63	(Sweden)	Carl Dahlström	D	L	31	2024	Stockholm, Sweden
17	(Switzerland)	Luca Fazzini (A)	W	R	31	2012	Lugano, Switzerland
5	(Switzerland)	Enzo Guebey	D	R	27	2026	Sallanches, France
27	(Switzerland)	Cyrill Henry	F	L	19	2025	Münsterlingen, Switzerland
12	(Finland)	Jere Innala	W	L	28	2026	Hauho, Finland
19	(Finland)	Rasmus Kupari	F	R	26	2025	Kotka, Finland
15	(Sweden)	Olle Lycksell	F	L	27	2026	Oskarshamn, Sweden
88	(Switzerland)	Robert Mayer	G	L	37	2026	Havířov, Czech Republic
23	(Italy)	Giovanni Morini	C	L	31	2015	Como, Italy
25	(Switzerland)	Mirco Müller	D	L	31	2021	Winterthur, Switzerland
91	(Denmark)	Daniel Olsson	F	L	21	2026	Copenhagen, Denmark
12	(Finland)	Aleksi Peltonen	D	L	28	2024	Helsinki, Finland
52	(Finland)	Jesper Peltonen	D	L	28	2023	Helsinki, Finland
21	(United States)	Zach Sanford	W	L	31	2025	Salem, Massachusetts, United States
34	(Switzerland)	Niklas Schlegel	G	L	32	2019	Zurich, Switzerland
73	(United States)	Nick Shore	C	R	34	2026	Denver, United States
94	(Switzerland)	Dario Simion	W	R	32	2025	Locarno, Switzerland
7	(Switzerland)	Ramon Tanner	C	L	27	2025	Appenzell, Switzerland
60	(Finland)	Lassi Thomson	D	R	26	2026	Tampere, Finland
97	(Switzerland)	Calvin Thürkauf (C)	C	L	29	2021	Zug, Switzerland
81	(Switzerland)	Enea Togni	D	L	21	2025	Bellinzona, Switzerland
9	(Switzerland)	Brian Zanetti	D	L	23	2025	Lugano, Switzerland
11	(Italy)	Marco Zanetti	RW	R	24	2023	Varese, Italy

=== Honored members ===
Retired jersey of Alfio Molina

HC Lugano retired numbers
No.	Player	Position	Career	No. retirement
1	Alfio Molina	G	1963–1983	22 February 2004
2	Sandro Bertaggia	D	1985–2003	22 February 2004
3	Julien Vauclair	D	1996–2020	16 September 2022
4	Pat Schafhauser	D	1994–1995	22 February 2004
33	Petteri Nummelin	D	2001–06, 2008–2013	31 August 2013
44	Andy Näser	F	1997–2010	28 August 2010

== Franchise records and leaders ==
=== All-time scoring leaders ===
Kind of record	Record holder	Record
Games played	Sandro Bertaggia	806
Most Goals	Jörg Eberle	268
Most Assists	Petteri Nummelin	305
Most Points	Andy Ton	462
Goals/Games	Mats Hallin	1.25
Points/Games	Kent Johansson	2.17
Goals (PP)	Jörg Eberle	40
Goals (SH)	Kent Johansson	9
Goals (OT)	Régis Fuchs	5
Goals (GW)	Jörg Eberle	46
Hattricks	Johansson Kent	12
Most Penalty Minutes	Sandro Bertaggia	891
Coach % games/victories	Harold Kreis	80%

=== Team records ===
HC Lugano records in the Swiss National League A.

Category	Record	Season
Most points in Regular Season	74	2003/04
Most victories in Regular Season	35	2003/04
Most shutouts in Regular Season (home+away)	10	1999/00
Most shutouts in Regular Season (away)	5	1999/00
Consecutive wins on Regular Season start (home+away)	10	2003/04
Consecutive wins on Regular Season start (home)	22	1999/00
Consecutive games without losing points on Regular Season start (home)	13	2004/05
Consecutive games without losing points on Regular Season start (away)	5	1985/86 and 2003/04
Consecutive wins during Regular Season (home+away)	27	1987/88
Consecutive wins during Regular Season (home)	22	1999/00
Consecutive wins during Regular Season (away)	15	1987/88
Consecutive games without losing points during Regular Season (home+away)	15	1988/89
Consecutive games without losing points during Regular Season (home)	17	1999/00
Consecutive games without losing points during Regular Season (away)	12	1987/88 and 2000/01
Score 4 goals on less time	1' 24" (HC Lugano - HC Davos 7:1)	1985/86
Most minutes without suffering goals during Regular Season	248' 10" (Cristobal Huet)	1999/00

== HC Lugano Ladies Team ==
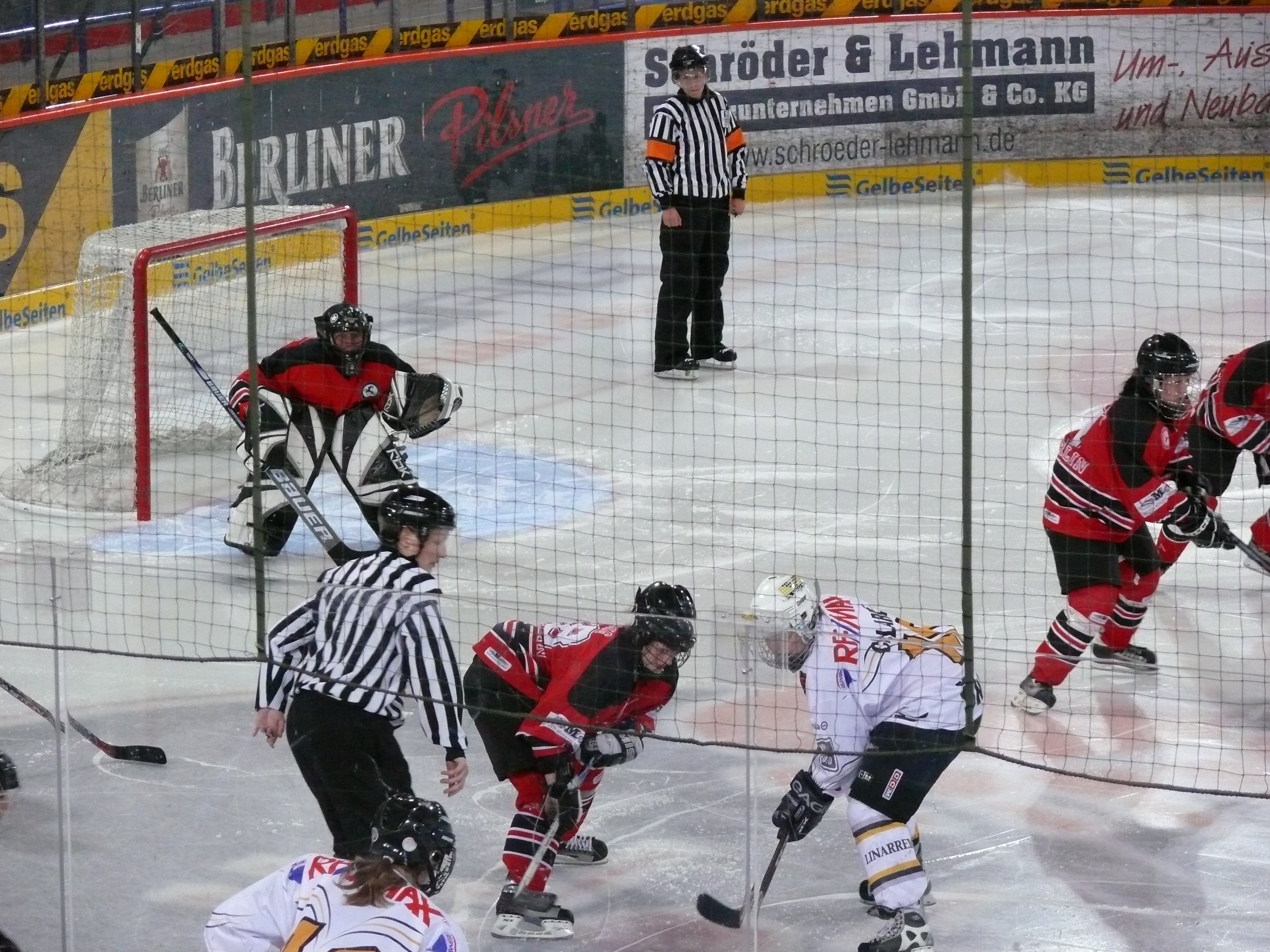
The HC Lugano Ladies Team (white dress) against the OSC Berlin at the first round of the EWCC 2007

The HC Lugano Ladies Team was a semi-professional women's ice hockey team that competes in the Swiss Women's A League. The club was officially founded on May 22, 1990. They won the Swiss Championship on 2006, 2007, 2009 and 2010.

In 2007, the HC Lugano Ladies Team qualified for the final round of the IIHF European Women's Champions Cup and even won the bronze medal 2010.
