= HC Fribourg-Gottéron =

Fribourg-Gottéron
- Nickname: Dragons
- City: Fribourg, Switzerland
- League: National League: NL 1980–present; SL 1953–1980
- Founded: 1938
- Home arena: BCF Arena
- Colors
- General manager: Gerd Zenhausern
- Head coach: Roger Rönnberg
- Captain: Andrea Glauser
- Affiliates: HC Thurgau
- Website: www.gotteron.ch

Franchise history
- HC Gottéron 1938–1967; HC Fribourg 1967–1980; HC Fribourg-Gottéron 1980–present

HC Fribourg-Gottéron is a professional ice hockey team based in Fribourg, Switzerland. The team competes in the National League (NL), the highest league in Switzerland.

== History ==
The club was originally started as HC Gottéron by the citizens of the town of Auge in 1938. They competed on an outdoor rink, most notably at Les Augustins, until 1982 when Patinoire St-Léonard was constructed.

In 1980, the name HC Fribourg-Gottéron was adopted upon promotion into the National League (NL). In spite of the club's financial struggles for the better part of their existence in the NL, they managed to reach the league's championship finals three years in a row (1992–94).

The team was saved from bankruptcy in 2006. Subsequently, HC Fribourg-Gottéron developed from a club that repeatedly had to fight for survival both on the ice and financially into a stable top team in the National League that regularly reaches the playoffs, has made several appearances in semifinals and finals, and ultimately crowned this development in the 2020s by winning the Spengler Cup in 2024 and securing the first Swiss championship title in the club’s history in April 2026.

From 2019 to 2020, the BCF Arena was renovated and expanded. Since the 2020/21 season, the stadium has had a capacity of 9,000 seats and is regularly sold out.

Fribourg-Gottéron won their first National League championship in 2026, defeating HC Davos in seven games in the championship series. Lucas Wallmark scored the game winning goal in overtime.

== Honors ==
=== Champions ===
- 2024 Spengler Cup
- National League (1): 2026

=== Runner-up ===
- National League (5): 1983, 1992, 1993, 1994, 2013

== Players ==
=== Current roster ===
Updated 29 October 2026.

No.	Nat	Player	Pos	S/G	Age	Acquired	Birthplace
22	(Switzerland)	Christoph Bertschy (C)	C	R	32	2022	Le Mouret, Switzerland
45	(Switzerland)	Yannik Boppart	F	R	19	2025	Burgdorf, Switzerland
21	(Finland)	Henrik Borgström	C	L	29	2025	Helsinki, Finland
95	(Sweden)	Jacob de la Rose (A)	C	L	31	2022	Arvika, Sweden
93	(Switzerland)	Jan Dorthe	C	L	20	2024	Fribourg, Switzerland
1	(Switzerland)	Loic Galley	G	L	24	2023	Romont, Switzerland
96	(Switzerland)	Andrea Glauser (C)	D	R	30	2025	Zauggenried, Switzerland
26	(Switzerland)	Alessio Guignard	D	L	20	2026	Bülach, Switzerland
11	(Sweden)	Lucas Hedlund	C	L	20	2025	Piteå, Sweden
7	(Switzerland)	Benoit Jecker	D	L	32	2020	Fribourg, Switzerland
33	(Switzerland)	Ludvig Johnson	D	L	20	2025	Zug, Switzerland
3	(United States)	Michael Kapla	D	L	32	2025	Eau Claire, Wisconsin, United States
97	(Switzerland)	Nathan Marchon	C	L	29	2014	Fribourg, Switzerland
12	(Sweden)	Patrik Nemeth	D	L	34	2025	Stockholm, Sweden
81	(Switzerland)	Elijah Neuenschwander	G	L	20	2025	Biel/Bienne, Switzerland
37	(Switzerland)	Kevin Nicolet	RW	R	23	2021	Fribourg, Switzerland
27	(Switzerland)	Yannick Rathgeb	D	R	31	2024	Langenthal, Switzerland
39	(Switzerland)	Jamiro Reber	C	L	20	2025	Münsingen, Switzerland
29	(Canada)	Anthony Richard	C	L	29	2026	Trois-Rivières, Québec, Canada
88	(Switzerland)	Thierry Schild	F	R	21	2026	Zollikofen, Switzerland
73	(Switzerland)	Sandro Schmid (A)	C	L	26	2019	Fribourg, Switzerland
5	(Switzerland)	Simon Seiler	D	L	30	2022	Frauenfeld, Switzerland
9	(Sweden)	Marcus Sörensen	W	L	34	2022	Södertälje, Sweden
77	(Switzerland)	Maximilian Streule	D	L	23	2023	Urdorf, Switzerland
40	(Switzerland)	Jonas Taibel	C	L	22	2026	Feldkirch, Austria
35	(Switzerland)	Ludovic Waeber	G	L	30	2026	Fribourg, Switzerland
23	(Switzerland)	Samuel Walser	C	L	34	2018	Olten, Switzerland
