= EV Zug =

- City: Zug, Switzerland
- League: National League
- Founded: 1967
- Home arena: OYM Hall
- Colors
- General manager: Ted Suihkonen
- Head coach: Benoit Groulx
- Captain: Jan Kovar
- Affiliates: EV Zug II
- Website: Official website

Franchise history
- 1967–present: EV Zug

EV Zug is a professional men's ice hockey team from Zug, Switzerland. The team competes in the National League (NL), the highest league in Switzerland. It plays its home games in the 7,800-seat OYM Hall.

== History ==
EV Zug won its first championship in the 1997–98 season, and the second one in the 2020–21 season.

In the 2021/2022 National League Season, EV Zug won a historic 4–3 comeback in the final, after being 0-3 games down to the ZSC Lions they changed the tie and broke an 80-year-old record set by the Toronto Maple Leafs.

== Honors ==
=== Champions ===
- NL Championship (3): 1998, 2021, 2022
- Swiss Cup (1): 2019

=== Runners-up ===
- NL Championship (4): 1995, 1997, 2017, 2019

== Players ==
=== Current roster ===
Updated 11 November 2026

No.	Nat	Player	Pos	S/G	Age	Acquired	Birthplace
86	(Switzerland)	Robin Antenen	LW	L	20	2023	Menziken, Switzerland
32	(Sweden)	Lukas Bengtsson	D	R	32	2023	Stockholm, Sweden
31	(Switzerland)	Mathieu Croce	G	L	23	2026	Genève, Switzerland
16	(Switzerland)	Raphael Díaz (A)	D	R	40	2025	Baar, Switzerland
96	(Switzerland)	Chris Egli	F	L	30	2026	Davos, Switzerland
42	(Switzerland)	Tobias Geisser	D	L	27	2022	Stans, Switzerland
30	(Switzerland)	Leonardo Genoni	G	L	39	2019	Semione, Switzerland
8	(Switzerland)	Rico Gredig	F	L	21	2026	
27	(Switzerland)	Samuel Guerra	D	L	33	2025	Sorengo, Switzerland
15	(Switzerland)	Grégory Hofmann (A)	LW	L	33	2022	Biel/Bienne, Switzerland
43	(Czech Republic)	Jan Kovář (C)	C	R	36	2019	Písek, Czechoslovakia
81	(Czech Republic)	Dominik Kubalík	LW	L	31	2025	Plzeň, Czech Republic
73	(Switzerland)	Mike Künzle	RW	R	32	2024	Zürich, Switzerland
61	(Switzerland)	Sven Leuenberger	C	R	27	2018	Hüttikon, Switzerland
95	(Switzerland)	Colin Lindemann	LW	L	21	2023	Zug, Switzerland
46	(Switzerland)	Lino Martschini	RW	R	33	2012	Lucerne, Switzerland
3	(Sweden)	Jacob Moverare	D	L	28	2026	Östersund, Sweden
11	(Slovenia)	Nik Petrovic	F	L	20	2026	Ljubljana, Slovenia
37	(Switzerland)	Elia Riva	D	L	28	2023	Claro, Switzerland
9	(Austria)	Vinzenz Rohrer (A)	F	R	22	2026	Rankweil, Austria
65	(Switzerland)	Eric Schneller	D	R	21	2026	
88	(Switzerland)	Sven Senteler (A)	C	L	34	2013	Zürich, Switzerland
66	(Czech Republic)	David Sklenička	D	L	30	2025	Rakovník, Czech Republic
14	(Switzerland)	Livio Stadler	D	L	28	2015	Steinhausen, Switzerland
90	(Slovakia)	Tomas Tatar	LW	L	35	2025	Ilava, Czechoslovakia
40	(Sweden)	Andreas Wingerli	LW	L	29	2023	Lycksele, Sweden

=== NHL alumni ===
- Ivan Hlinka 1983–85
- Don "Red" Laurence 1986–91
- Mike Kaszycki 1988–89
- Ken Yaremchuk 1990–96
- Patrick Fischer 1992–97, 2003–06, 2007–09
- Bill McDougall 1995–98
- John Miner 1995–98
- Wes Walz 1996–99
- Paul DiPietro 1999–2004, 2005–11
- Chris Tancill 1999–2004
- Todd Elik 2000–02
- James Black 2002–03
- Raphael Diaz 2003–11, 2016–21
- Claude Lemieux 2003–04
- Barry Richter 2003–08
- Mike Fisher 2004–05
- Niko Kapanen 2004–05
- Oleg Petrov 2004–08
- Luca Sbisa 2006–07
- Dale McTavish 2007–10
- Reto Berra 2008–09
- Damien Brunner 2008–13
- Micki DuPont 2008–10
- Josh Holden 2008–18
- Andrei Bashkirov 2009–10
- Jussi Markkanen 2009–13, 2016–17
- Glen Metropolit 2010–12
- Andy Wozniewski 2010–13
- Timo Helbling 2011–13, 2016–18
- Esa Pirnes 2011–12
- Linus Omark 2012–13
- Henrik Zetterberg 2012–13
- Brian Boucher 2013–14
- Robbie Earl 2013–15
- Andrew Hutchinson 2013–14
- Tim Ramholt 2013–16
- Rob Schremp 2013–14
- Kyle Wellwood 2013–14
- Pierre-Marc Bouchard 2014–16
- Tobias Stephan 2014–19
- Michal Řepík 2014–15
- Jarkko Immonen 2015–17
- Carl Klingberg 2016–present
- David McIntyre 2016–20
- Garrett Roe 2017–19
- Viktor Stålberg 2017–18
- Dennis Everberg 2018–19
- Grégory Hofmann 2019–20; 2021-pres.
- Justin Abdelkader 2021–23
- Fredrik Olofsson 2024-pres.
- Tomáš Tatar 2024-pres.

== EV Zug Women ==
EV Zug Women is a professional women's ice hockey team that competes, as of the 2025–2026 season, in the SWHL-A: the first division of the Switzerland women's ice hockey league. In the 2025/2026 season they won the title against SC Bern in a 3–0 sweep.

Players:

- Chiara Pfosi
- Yara Keller
- Annic Büchi
- Mara Frey
- Annika Fazokas
- Nina Harju
- Leonie Kutzer
- Lara Stalder
- Sarah Mettler
- Lia Egger
- Emma Lintner
- Luisa Waser
- Jael Manetsch
- Rahel Enzler
- Noemi Ryhner
- Chiara Eggli
- Alina Marti
