= Raiffeisen Arena =

Ice hockey arena in Porrentruy, Switzerland

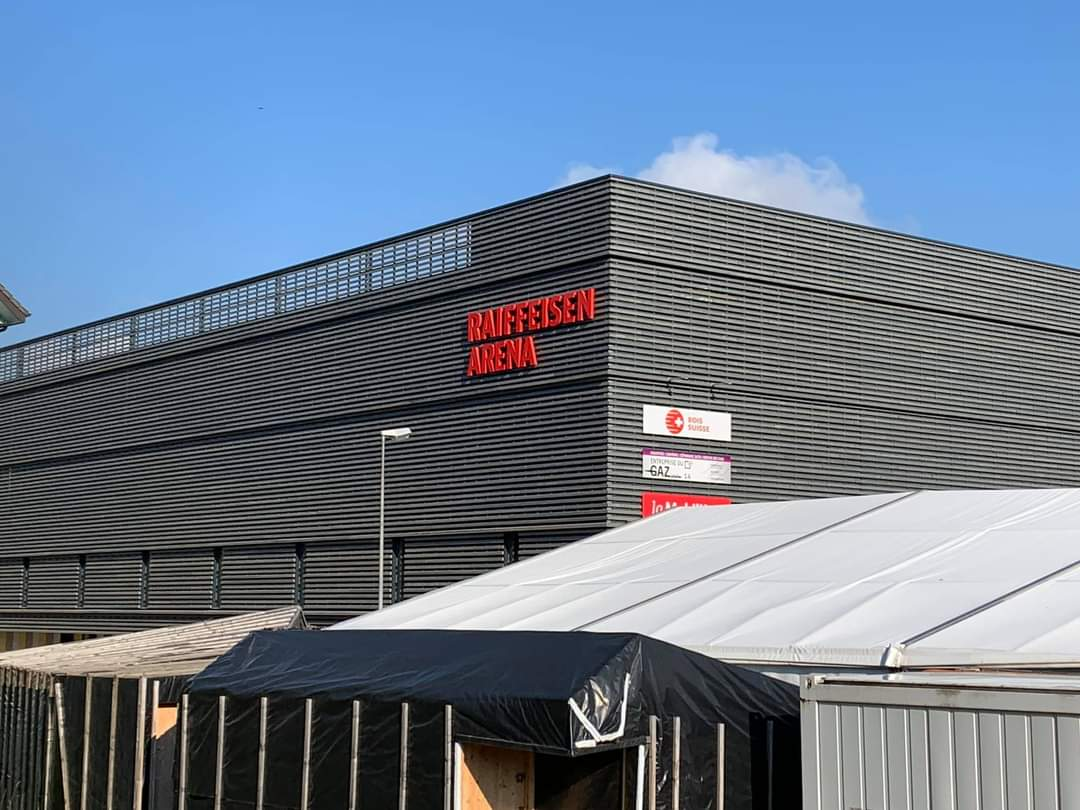
- Interactive map of Raiffeisen Arena
- Former names: Patinoire de Porrentruy (1973–2020)
- Address: Route de Courgenay 21 CH-2900
- Location: Porrentruy, Switzerland
- Coordinates: 47°25′N 07°05′E
- Capacity: 5,178

Construction
- Opened: 1973
- Renovated: 2020
- Expanded: 2020
- Cost: CHF 27.8 million (renovation)
- Architects: Dolci Architectes; Stähelin Partner

Tenant
- HC Ajoie (NL) (1973–present)

The Raiffeisen Arena is an ice hockey arena in Porrentruy, Switzerland. The arena serves as the home for HC Ajoie of the National League (NL).

== History ==
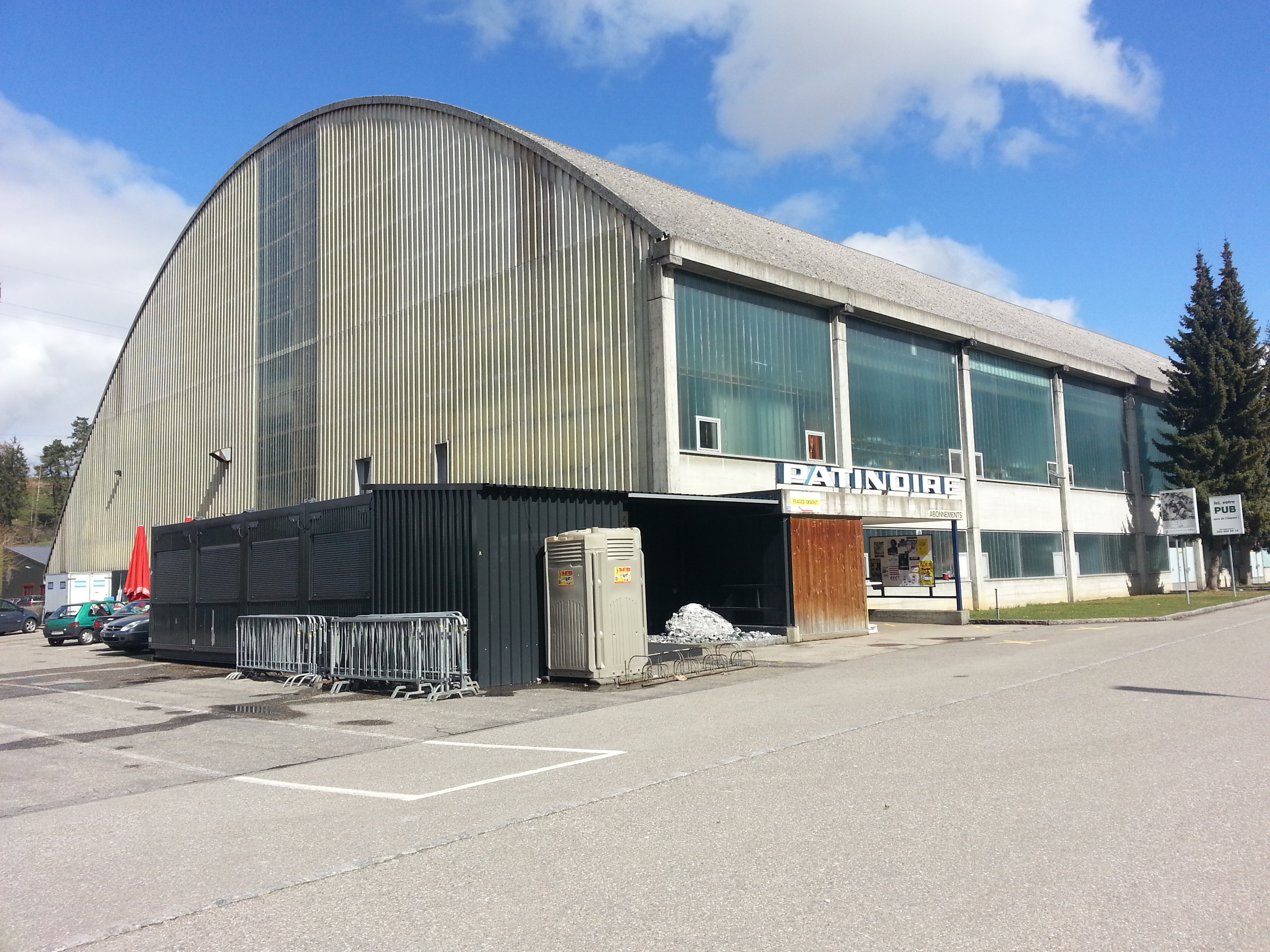
Raiffeisen Arena prior to renovations

Raiffeisen Arena was formerly known as Patinoire de Porrentruy and has been the home arena for HC Ajoie since 1973. In 2018, the Porrentruy District voted yes on the renovation and expansion of the arena. Ground breaking for the arena renovations began in July 2019. The arena began to be erected in November 2019. The wood for the arena was largely sourced from the surrounding communities. 2,000 cubic meter of softwood and 1,000 cubic meter of hardwood were used. The expansion began in May 2020, when the existing ice rink was renovated to meet modern standards.

The new 4,650-seat arena is also used by the curling club, figure skaters and the general public for ice skating. A second ice rink was also built with National Hockey League (NHL) dimensions. HC Ajoie played away games to begin the season, until the new arena was completed. The first game at Raiffeisen Arena was played on November 24, 2020, in front of a crowd of 4,761 people.

In December 2022 it was announced Raiffeisen Arena would serve as a second venue for the 2023 IIHF World U18 Championships.
