= List of Swiss ice hockey champions =

The Swiss national championship in ice hockey has been contested in various forms since 1909.

== History ==
The Swiss National Championship was first contested in 1909, and continued until 1937, when it was replaced by the Nationalliga A. Due to World War I, it was not contested in the 1914 and 1915 seasons.

Between 1916 and 1933, alongside the Swiss National Championship, the Swiss International Championship was contested. Unlike the National Championship, which had restrictions on the number of foreigners allowed to play, an unlimited number of foreign players were allowed to compete in the International Championship.

Since the 1937–38 season, the Nationalliga A, now called the National League A, is established as the highest level league in Switzerland. In the 1985–86 season, the Swiss Champion was first awarded in the playoffs.

The women's national championship has been contested annually since 1987. The league is known as the Leistungsklasse A. It is also known as Swiss Women's Hockey League A.

== Swiss champions (men's) ==
=== National Championship (1909–1937) ===
- 1909: HC Bellerive Vevey
- 1910: HC La Villa Lausanne
- 1911: Club des patineurs de Lausanne
- 1912: HC Les Avants
- 1913: HC Les Avants
- 1914: not contested
- 1915: not contested
- 1916: HC Bern
- 1917: HC Bern
- 1918: HC Bern
- 1919: HC Bellerive Vevey
- 1920: HC Bellerive Vevey
- 1921: HC Rosey-Gstaad
- 1922: EHC St. Moritz
- 1923: EHC St. Moritz
- 1924: HC Château-d’Œx
- 1925: HC Rosey-Gstaad
- 1926: HC Davos
- 1927: HC Davos
- 1928: EHC St. Moritz
- 1929: HC Davos
- 1930: HC Davos
- 1931: HC Davos
- 1932: HC Davos
- 1933: HC Davos
- 1934: HC Davos
- 1935: HC Davos
- 1936: Zürcher SC
- 1937: HC Davos

=== International Championship (1916–1933) ===
- 1916: Akademischer EHC Zürich
- 1917: HC Les Avants
- 1918: HC Bellerive Vevey
- 1919: HC Rosey Gstaad
- 1920: HC Rosey Gstaad
- 1921: HC Rosey Gstaad
- 1922: HC Château-d’Œx
- 1923: EHC St Moritz
- 1924: HC Château-d’Œx
- 1925: HC Rosey Gstaad
- 1926: no champion
- 1927: HC Davos
- 1928: HC Rosey Gstaad
- 1929: HC Davos
- 1930: HC Davos
- 1931: HC Davos
- 1932: HC Davos
- 1933: Grasshopper Club Zürich

=== Nationalliga A (1938–2006) ===
- 1938: HC Davos
- 1939: HC Davos
- 1940: not contested
- 1941: HC Davos
- 1942: HC Davos
- 1943: HC Davos
- 1944: HC Davos
- 1945: HC Davos
- 1946: HC Davos
- 1947: HC Davos
- 1948: HC Davos
- 1949: Zürcher SC
- 1950: HC Davos
- 1951: EHC Arosa
- 1952: EHC Arosa
- 1953: EHC Arosa
- 1954: EHC Arosa
- 1955: EHC Arosa
- 1956: EHC Arosa
- 1957: EHC Arosa
- 1958: HC Davos
- 1959: SC Bern
- 1960: HC Davos
- 1961: Zürcher SC
- 1962: EHC Visp
- 1963: HC Villars
- 1964: HC Villars
- 1965: SC Bern
- 1966: Grasshopper Club Zürich
- 1967: EHC Kloten
- 1968: HC La Chaux-de-Fonds
- 1969: HC La Chaux-de-Fonds
- 1970: HC La Chaux-de-Fonds
- 1971: HC La Chaux-de-Fonds
- 1972: HC La Chaux-de-Fonds
- 1973: HC La Chaux-de-Fonds
- 1974: SC Bern
- 1975: SC Bern
- 1976: SC Langnau
- 1977: SC Bern
- 1978: EHC Biel
- 1979: SC Bern
- 1980: EHC Arosa
- 1981: EHC Biel
- 1982: EHC Arosa
- 1983: EHC Biel
- 1984: HC Davos
- 1985: HC Davos
- 1986: HC Lugano
- 1987: HC Lugano
- 1988: HC Lugano
- 1989: SC Bern
- 1990: HC Lugano
- 1991: SC Bern
- 1992: SC Bern
- 1993: EHC Kloten
- 1994: EHC Kloten
- 1995: EHC Kloten
- 1996: EHC Kloten
- 1997: SC Bern
- 1998: EV Zug
- 1999: HC Lugano
- 2000: ZSC Lions
- 2001: ZSC Lions
- 2002: HC Davos
- 2003: HC Lugano
- 2004: SC Bern
- 2005: HC Davos
- 2006: HC Lugano

=== National League A (2007–2017) ===
- 2007: HC Davos
- 2008: ZSC Lions
- 2009: HC Davos
- 2010: SC Bern
- 2011: HC Davos
- 2012: ZSC Lions
- 2013: SC Bern
- 2014: ZSC Lions
- 2015: HC Davos
- 2016: SC Bern
- 2017: SC Bern

=== National League (2018–present) ===
- 2018: ZSC Lions
- 2019: SC Bern
- 2020: not contested
- 2021: EV Zug
- 2022: EV Zug
- 2023: Genève-Servette HC
- 2024: ZSC Lions
- 2025: ZSC Lions
- 2026: HC Fribourg-Gottéron

=== Titles by club ===
Titles	Club
31	HC Davos
16	SC Bern
11	ZSC Lions (earlier known as Zürcher SC)
9	EHC Arosa
7	HC Lugano
6	HC La Chaux-de-Fonds
5	EHC Kloten
3	HC Bellerive Vevey
3	EHC St. Moritz
3	HC Bern
3	EHC Biel
3	EV Zug
2	HC Les Avants
2	HC Rosey-Gstaad
2	HC Villars
1	HC La Villa Lausanne
1	Club des Pâtineurs de Lausanne
1	HC Château-d’Œx
1	EHC Visp
1	GCK Lions
1	SC Langnau
1	Genève-Servette HC
1	HC Fribourg-Gottéron

=== Swiss Cup winners (men's) ===
- 1957: HC Neuchâtel Young Sprinters
- 1958: HC Neuchâtel Young Sprinters
- 1959: Genève-Servette HC
- 1960: ZSC Lions
- 1961: ZSC Lions
- 1962: HC Ambrì-Piotta
- 1963: HC Neuchâtel Young Sprinters
- 1964: EHC Visp
- 1965: SC Bern
- 1966: Grasshopper Club Zürich
- 1972: Genève-Servette HC
- 2015: SC Bern
- 2016: ZSC Lions
- 2017: EHC Kloten
- 2018: SC Rapperswil-Jona Lakers
- 2019: EV Zug

== Swiss champions (women's) ==
=== Leistungsklasse A ===
- 1987: EHC Kloten Specials
- 1988: EHC Kloten Specials
- 1989: Grasshopper Club Zürich
- 1990: Grasshopper Club Zürich
- 1991: Grasshopper Club Zürich
- 1992: EHC Bülach
- 1993: SC Lyss
- 1994: DHC Langenthal
- 1995: SC Lyss
- 1996: SC Lyss
- 1997: DHC Lyss
- 1998: EV Zug
- 1999: EV Zug
- 2000: DSC St. Gallen
- 2001: SC Reinach
- 2002: SC Reinach
- 2003: SC Reinach
- 2004: EV Zug
- 2005: EV Zug
- 2006: Ladies Team Lugano
- 2007: Ladies Team Lugano
- 2008: DHC Langenthal
- 2009: Ladies Team Lugano
- 2010: Ladies Team Lugano
- 2011: ZSC Lions Frauen
- 2012: ZSC Lions Frauen
- 2013: ZSC Lions Frauen
- 2014: Ladies Team Lugano
- 2015: Ladies Team Lugano
- 2016: ZSC Lions Frauen
- 2017: ZSC Lions Frauen
- 2018: ZSC Lions Frauen
- 2019: Ladies Team Lugano

=== Titles by club ===
Titles	Club
9	ZSC Lions Frauen (earlier known as Grasshopper Club Zürich)
7	Ladies Team Lugano
4	EV Zug
4	DHC Lyss (earlier known as SC Lyss)
3	SC Reinach
2	DHC Langenthal
2	EHC Kloten
1	DSC St. Gallen
1	EHC Bülach

=== Swiss Cup champions (women's) ===
- 2006: Ladies Team Lugano
- 2007: not contested
- 2008: DHC Langenthal
- 2009: ZSC Lions Frauen
- 2010: DHC Langenthal
- 2011: ZSC Lions Frauen
- 2012: ZSC Lions Frauen
- 2013: ZSC Lions Frauen
- 2014: ZSC Lions Frauen
- 2015: not contested
- 2016: ZSC Lions Frauen
- 2017: Ladies Team Lugano
- 2018: ZSC Lions Frauen
- 2019: ZSC Lions Frauen

== See also ==
- National League A
- Swiss League
- Swiss Women's Hockey League A
- List of NLA seasons
