= 2010 World Junior Ice Hockey Championships rosters =

== Top Division ==
=== Group A ===
==== Canada ====
- Head coach: (Canada) Willie Desjardins

Pos.	No.	Player	Team	NHL Rights
GK	1	Jake Allen	(Canada) Le Club de Hockey Junior de Montréal	St. Louis Blues
GK	31	Martin Jones	(Canada) Calgary Hitmen	Los Angeles Kings
D	2	Colten Teubert	(Canada) Regina Pats	Los Angeles Kings
D	3	Travis Hamonic	(Canada) Moose Jaw Warriors	New York Islanders
D	5	Marco Scandella	(Canada) Val-d'Or Foreurs	Minnesota Wild
D	6	Ryan Ellis	(Canada) Windsor Spitfires	Nashville Predators
D	22	Jared Cowen	(United States) Spokane Chiefs	Ottawa Senators
D	24	Calvin de Haan	(Canada) Oshawa Generals	New York Islanders
D	27	Alex Pietrangelo	(United States) St. Louis Blues	St. Louis Blues
F	4	Taylor Hall	(Canada) Windsor Spitfires	Edmonton Oilers
F	7	Gabriel Bourque	(Canada) Baie-Comeau Drakkar	Nashville Predators
F	9	Nazem Kadri	(Canada) London Knights	Toronto Maple Leafs
F	10	Brayden Schenn	(Canada) Brandon Wheat Kings	Los Angeles Kings
F	12	Adam Henrique	(Canada) Windsor Spitfires	New Jersey Devils
F	14	Jordan Eberle	(Canada) Regina Pats	Edmonton Oilers
F	15	Brandon McMillan	(Canada) Kelowna Rockets	Anaheim Ducks
F	16	Greg Nemisz	(Canada) Windsor Spitfires	Calgary Flames
F	17	Brandon Kozun	(Canada) Calgary Hitmen	Los Angeles Kings
F	19	Stefan Della Rovere	(Canada) Barrie Colts	Washington Capitals
F	20	Luke Adam	(Canada) Cape Breton Screaming Eagles	Buffalo Sabres
F	26	Jordan Caron	(Canada) Rimouski Océanic	Boston Bruins
F	28	Patrice Cormier (C)	(Canada) Rimouski Océanic	New Jersey Devils

==== Slovakia ====
- Head coach: (Slovakia) Štefan Mikeš

Pos.	No.	Player	Team	NHL Rights
GK	1	Marek Čiliak	(Slovakia) Orange 20 Puchov
GK	2	Tomáš Halasz	(Slovakia) Košice
D	3	Martin Stajnoch	(Slovakia) Slovan Bratislava
D	4	Henrich Jaborník	(Slovakia) Orange 20 Puchov
D	8	Matúš Rais	(Slovakia) Orange 20 Puchov
D	16	Peter Hraško	(Slovakia) Orange 20 Puchov
D	21	Michal Šiška	(Slovakia) Orange 20 Puchov
D	25	Martin Marinčin	(Slovakia) Orange 20 Puchov	Edmonton Oilers
D	29	Ivan Janković	(Slovakia) Orange 20 Puchov
F	6	Maroš Grosaft	(Slovakia) Orange 20 Puchov
F	7	Martin Bakoš	(Slovakia) Orange 20 Puchov
F	10	Tomáš Tatar	(United States) Grand Rapids Griffins	Detroit Red Wings
F	12	František Gerhat	(Czech Republic) HC Litvínov
F	13	Libor Hudáček	(Slovakia) Orange 20 Puchov
F	14	Samuel Mlynarovič	(Slovakia) Orange 20 Puchov
F	17	Radoslav Illo	(United States) Tri-City Storm	Anaheim Ducks
F	18	Jakub Gašparovič	(Slovakia) Orange 20 Puchov
F	20	Michael Vandas	(Slovakia) Orange 20 Puchov
F	24	Marek Viedenský	(Canada) Saskatoon Blades	San Jose Sharks
F	26	Adam Lapšanský	(Slovakia) HK Aquacity ŠKP Poprad
F	27	Andrej Šťastný	(Slovakia) Orange 20 Puchov
F	28	Richard Pánik	(Canada) Windsor Spitfires	Tampa Bay Lightning

==== United States ====
- Head coach: (United States) Dean Blais

Pos.	No.	Player	Team	NHL Rights
GK	1	Jack Campbell	(United States) US National Under-18 Team (USNTDP)	Dallas Stars
GK	30	Mike Lee	(United States) St. Cloud State University	Phoenix Coyotes
D	11	John Carlson (A)	(United States) Hershey Bears	Washington Capitals
D	4	Matt Donovan	(United States) University of Denver	New York Islanders
D	24	Cam Fowler	(Canada) Windsor Spitfires	Anaheim Ducks
D	28	Jake Gardiner	(United States) University of Wisconsin	Anaheim Ducks
D	18	Brian Lashoff	(Canada) Kingston Frontenacs	Detroit Red Wings
D	2	John Ramage	(United States) University of Wisconsin	Calgary Flames
D	5	David Warsofsky	(United States) Boston University	St. Louis Blues
F	17	Ryan Bourque	(Canada) Quebec Remparts	New York Rangers
F	29	Jerry D'Amigo	(United States) Rensselaer Polytechnic Institute	Toronto Maple Leafs
F	22	AJ Jenks	(United States) Plymouth Whalers	Florida Panthers
F	10	Tyler Johnson	(United States) Spokane Chiefs
F	20	Chris Kreider	(United States) Boston College	New York Rangers
F	8	Danny Kristo	(United States) University of North Dakota	Montreal Canadiens
F	9	Philip McRae	(Canada) London Knights	St. Louis Blues
F	26	Jeremy Morin	(Canada) Kitchener Rangers	Atlanta Thrashers
F	23	Kyle Palmieri	(United States) University of Notre Dame	Anaheim Ducks
F	19	Jordan Schroeder (A)	(United States) University of Minnesota	Vancouver Canucks
F	21	Derek Stepan (C)	(United States) University of Wisconsin	New York Rangers
F	14	Luke Walker	(United States) Portland Winterhawks	Colorado Avalanche
F	16	Jason Zucker	(United States) US National Under-18 Team (USNTDP)	Minnesota Wild

==== Latvia ====
- Head coach: (Latvia) Andrejs Maticins

Pos.	No.	Player	Team
GK	2	Jānis Kalniņš	(Latvia) Liepājas Metalurgs
GK	30	Raimonds Ermičs	(United States) Boston Bulldogs
D	3	Alberts Iliško	(Sweden) Nynäshamn
D	4	Gvido Kauss	(Latvia) Dinamo-Juniors
D	5	Ēriks Ševčenko	(Latvia) Dinamo-Juniors
D	8	Jānis Šmits	(Sweden) Nynäshamn
D	24	Rolands Gritāns	(Latvia) SK LSPA/Riga
D	25	Mārtiņš Jakovļevs	(Latvia) Dinamo-Juniors
D	26	Kārlis Kalvītis	(United States) Shattuck-Saint Mary's
D	29	Ralfs Freibergs	(Latvia) Dinamo-Juniors
F	7	Raimonds Vilkoits	(Latvia) Dinamo-Juniors
F	9	Juris Upītis	(Latvia) Dinamo-Juniors
F	10	Miks Indrašis	(Latvia) Dinamo-Juniors
F	11	Roberts Bukarts	(Latvia) Dinamo Riga
F	13	Gunārs Skvorcovs	(Latvia) Liepājas Metalurgs
F	15	Ronalds Ķēniņš	(Switzerland) GCK Lions
F	16	Artūrs Mickēvičs	(Latvia) Liepājas Metalurgs
F	19	Roberts Maziņš	(United States) New England Stars
F	20	Miks Lipsbergs	(Latvia) Ozolnieki/Juniors
F	21	Ronalds Cinks	(Latvia) Dinamo Riga
F	22	Rolands Vīgners	(France) Asnières
F	28	Edgars Uļeščenko	(Czech Republic) HC Kladno

==== Switzerland ====
- Head coach: (Switzerland) Jakob Kölliker

Pos.	No.	Player	Team	NHL Rights
GK	1	Benjamin Conz	(Switzerland) SC Langnau Tigers
GK	10	Matthias Mischler	(Switzerland) SC Bern
D	2	Luca Camperchioli	(Switzerland) GCK Lions
D	28	Jannik Fischer	(Switzerland) EV Zug
D	4	Patrick Geering	(Switzerland) EV Zug
D	27	Roman Josi	(Switzerland) SC Bern	Nashville Predators
D	23	Michael Loichat	(Switzerland) EV Zug
D	5	Luca Sbisa	(Canada) Lethbridge Hurricanes	Anaheim Ducks
D	18	Dominik Schlumpf	(Canada) Shawinigan Cataractes
D	7	Lukas Stoop	(Switzerland) HC Davos
D	32	Ramon Untersander	(Switzerland) HC Davos
F	16	Benjamin Antonietti	(Switzerland) Genève-Servette HC
F	15	Jeffrey Fuglister	(Switzerland) Kloten Flyers
F	3	Nicolas Gay	(Switzerland) EHC Basel
F	21	Mauro Jörg	(Switzerland) HC Lugano
F	26	Pascal Marolf	(Switzerland) EHC Basel
F	19	Ryan McGregor	(Switzerland) GCK Lions
F	22	Nino Niederreiter	(United States) Portland Winterhawks	New York Islanders
F	8	Sven Ryser	(Switzerland) GCK Lions
F	9	Reto Schappi	(Switzerland) GCK Lions
F	10	Tristan Scherwey	(Switzerland) SC Bern
F	17	Tim Weber	(Sweden) Modo Hockey

=== Group B ===
==== Sweden ====
- Head coach: (Sweden) Pär Mårts

Pos.	No.	Player	Team	NHL Rights
GK	1	Anders Nilsson	(Sweden) Luleå HF	New York Islanders
GK	25	Jacob Markström	(Sweden) Brynäs IF	Florida Panthers
D	2	Lukas Kilström	(Sweden) Södertälje SK
D	3	Oliver Ekman-Larsson	(Sweden) Leksands IF	Phoenix Coyotes
D	4	Tim Erixon	(Sweden) Skellefteå AIK	Calgary Flames
D	5	Adam Larsson	(Sweden) Skellefteå AIK
D	6	Peter Andersson	(Sweden) Frölunda HC	Vancouver Canucks
D	7	David Rundblad	(Sweden) Skellefteå AIK	Ottawa Senators
D	14	Mattias Ekholm	(Sweden) Mora IK	Nashville Predators
F	9	Mattias Tedenby	(Sweden) HV71	New Jersey Devils
F	10	Jacob Josefson	(Sweden) Djurgårdens IF	New Jersey Devils
F	11	Marcus Johansson	(Sweden) Färjestad BK	Washington Capitals
F	12	Dennis Rasmussen	(Sweden) VIK Västerås HK
F	13	Jakob Silfverberg	(Sweden) Brynäs IF	Ottawa Senators
F	16	Anton Lander	(Sweden) Timrå IK	Edmonton Oilers
F	17	Carl Klingberg	(Sweden) Frölunda HC	Atlanta Thrashers
F	18	Anton Rödin	(Sweden) Brynäs IF	Vancouver Canucks
F	20	André Petersson	(Sweden) HV71	Ottawa Senators
F	21	Magnus Pääjärvi-Svensson	(Sweden) Timrå IK	Edmonton Oilers
F	24	Marcus Krüger	(Sweden) Djurgårdens IF	Chicago Blackhawks
F	26	Daniel Brodin	(Sweden) Djurgårdens IF	Toronto Maple Leafs
F	27	Martin Lundberg	(Sweden) Skellefteå AIK

==== Russia ====
- Head coach: (Russia) Vladimir Plyushchev

Pos.	No.	Player	Team	NHL Rights
GK	1	Ramis Sadikov	(United States) Erie Otters
GK	20	Igor Bobkov	(Russia) Metallurg Magnitogorsk	Anaheim Ducks
D	2	Nikita Zaitsev	(Russia) Sibir Novosibirsk
D	3	Nikita Pivtsakin	(Russia) Avangard Omsk
D	5	Dmitri Kostromitin	(Canada) Rouyn-Noranda Huskies
D	9	Dmitri Orlov	(Russia) Metallurg Novokuznetsk	Washington Capitals
D	26	Alexander Tarasov	(Russia) MVD
D	27	Maxim Chudinov	(Russia) Severstal Cherepovets	Boston Bruins
D	29	Anton Klementyev	(United States) Bridgeport Sound Tigers	New York Islanders
F	7	Vyacheslav Kulemin	(Russia) CSKA Moscow
F	8	Alexander Burmistrov	(Canada) Barrie Colts	Atlanta Thrashers
F	10	Vladimir Tarasenko	(Russia) Sibir Novosibirsk	St. Louis Blues
F	11	Maxim Trunev	(Russia) Severstal Cherepovets	Montreal Canadiens
F	13	Maxim Kitsyn	(Russia) Metallurg Magnitogorsk	Los Angeles Kings
F	14	Ivan Telegin	(United States) Saginaw Spirit
F	16	Petr Khokhriakov	(Russia) Neftekhimik Nizhnekamsk
F	17	Evgeny Kuznetsov	(Russia) Traktor Chelyabinsk	Washington Capitals
F	19	Pavel Dedunov	(Russia) Amur Khabarovsk
F	21	Kirill Petrov	(Russia) Neftyanik Almetyevsk	New York Islanders
F	22	Yevgeni Timkin	(Russia) Avangard Omsk
F	25	Magomed Gimbatov	(Russia) SKA Saint Petersburg
F	28	Nikita Filatov	(Russia) CSKA Moscow	Columbus Blue Jackets

==== Czech Republic ====
- Head coach: (Czech Republic) Jaromir Sindel

Pos.	No.	Player	Team	NHL Rights
GK	1	Pavel Francouz	(Czech Republic) HC Plzeň
GK	30	Jakub Sedlaček	(Czech Republic) RI OKNA Zlín
D	3	Radko Gudas	(United States) Everett Silvertips	Tampa Bay Lightning
D	5	Jakub Jeřábek	(Czech Republic) HC Plzeň
D	23	Michal Jordán	(United States) Plymouth Whalers	Carolina Hurricanes
D	29	Michal Kempný	(Czech Republic) HC Kometa Brno
D	7	Andrej Šustr	(United States) Youngstown Phantoms
D	15	Vladimír Roth	(Czech Republic) HC Slavia Praha
D	4	Tomáš Voráček	(Czech Republic) HC Vítkovice
F	12	Tomáš Dolezal	(Czech Republic) HC Slavia Praha
F	26	Michal Hlinka	(Canada) Chicoutimi Saguenéens
F	10	Roman Horák	(Canada) Chilliwack Bruins	New York Rangers
F	9	Jan Káňa	(Czech Republic) HC Vítkovice
F	24	Jan Kovář	(Czech Republic) HC Plzeň
F	13	Robert Kousal	(Czech Republic) HC Moeller Pardubiče
F	14	Tomáš Knotek	(Canada) Halifax Mooseheads
F	18	Tomáš Kubalík	(Canada) Victoriaville Tigres	Columbus Blue Jackets
F	11	Andrej Nestrasil	(Canada) Victoriaville Tigres	Detroit Red Wings
F	27	David Ostřížek	(Czech Republic) HC Oceláři Třinec
F	16	Štěpán Novotný	(Canada) Swift Current Broncos
F	22	Tomáš Vincour	(Canada) Edmonton Oil Kings	Dallas Stars

==== Finland ====
- Head coach: (Finland) Hannu Jortikka

Pos.	No.	Player	Team	NHL Rights
GK	1	Joni Ortio	(Finland) TPS	Calgary Flames
GK	28	Petteri Similä	(Canada) Niagara Ice Dogs	Montreal Canadiens
D	9	Sami Vatanen	(Finland) JYP	Anaheim Ducks
D	4	Teemu Eronen	(Finland) Jokerit
D	8	Jyri Niemi	(Canada) Saskatoon Blades	New York Rangers
D	6	Kristian Näkyvä	(Finland) Espoo Blues
D	3	Tommi Kivistö	(Finland) Jokerit	Carolina Hurricanes
D	12	Aleksi Laakso	(Finland) Blues
D	25	Veli-Matti Vittasmäki	(Finland) TPS
F	22	Mikael Granlund	(Finland) HIFK	Minnesota Wild
F	10	Matias Myttynen	(Finland) Ilves
F	11	Toni Rajala	(Canada) Brandon Wheat Kings	Edmonton Oilers
F	13	Matias Sointu	(Canada) Sudbury Wolves	Tampa Bay Lightning
F	14	Pekka Jormakka	(Finland) JYP
F	16	Eero Elo	(Finland) Lukko	Minnesota Wild
F	18	Iiro Pakarinen	(Finland) KalPa
F	19	Joonas Rask	(Finland) Ilves	Nashville Predators
F	20	Jere Sallinen	(Finland) Espoo Blues	Minnesota Wild
F	21	Jasse Ikonen	(Finland) JYP
F	24	Jani Lajunen	(Finland) Espoo Blues	Nashville Predators
F	29	Joonas Nättinen	(Finland) Espoo Blues	Montreal Canadiens
F	35	Teemu Hartikainen	(Finland) KalPa	Edmonton Oilers

==== Austria ====
- Head coach: (Austria) Dieter Werfring

Pos.	No.	Player	Team
GK	1	Lorenz Hirn	(Austria) Black Wings Linz
GK	32	Marco Wieser	(United States) Alpena Icediggers
D	13	Nikolaus Hartl	(Austria) Zell Am See
D	2	Maximilian Oliver Isopp	(Austria) Salzburg
D	22	Florian Muhlstein	(Austria) Salzburg
D	6	Alexander Pallestrang	(Austria) Black Wings Linz
D	9	Fabian Scholz	(Austria) Klagenfurt
D	8	Stefan Ulmer	(United States) Spokane Chiefs
D	3	Andreas Untergaschnigg	(Austria) Salzburg
D	4	Marco Zorec	(Austria) Villacher
F	19	Dominique Heinrich	(Austria) Salzburg
F	14	Fabio Hofer	(Austria) Dornbirn
F	10	Pascal Kainz	(Austria) Lustenau
F	15	Konstantin Komarek	(Sweden) Luleå
F	25	Alexander Korner	(Austria) Salzburg
F	18	Andreas Kristler	(Austria) Villacher
F	16	Patrick Maier	(Austria) Salzburg
F	17	Markus Pock	(Austria) Klagenfurt
F	23	Peter Schneider	(Czech Republic) Znojemští Orli
F	7	Markus Unterweger	(Austria) Salzburg
F	24	Maximilian Wilfan	(Sweden) Grums
F	27	Marcel Wolf	(Austria) Dornbirn

== NHL prospects by team ==
There were 84 NHL-drafted prospects playing in the tournament, out of 219 total players. This is an increase of 14.5% over the previous edition of this tournament which had 72. The Latvian and Austrian teams did not have any NHL prospects on their rosters. There were also several eligible for the 2010 draft.

Team	Prospects
Anaheim Ducks	7
New York Islanders	7
New York Rangers	7
Edmonton Oilers	5
Nashville Predators	5
St. Louis Blues	5
Los Angeles Kings	4
Montreal Canadiens	4
New Jersey Devils	4
Washington Capitals	4
Calgary Flames	3
Detroit Red Wings	3
Minnesota Wild	3
Ottawa Senators	3
Vancouver Canucks	3
Atlanta Thrashers	2
Carolina Hurricanes	2
Columbus Blue Jackets	2
Florida Panthers	2
Phoenix Coyotes	2
Tampa Bay Lightning	2
Toronto Maple Leafs	2
Boston Bruins	2
Buffalo Sabres	1
Chicago Blackhawks	1
Dallas Stars	1
San Jose Sharks	1
Colorado Avalanche	0
Philadelphia Flyers	0
Pittsburgh Penguins	0

== See also ==
- 2010 World Junior Ice Hockey Championships
- 2010 World Junior Ice Hockey Championships – Division I
- 2010 World Junior Ice Hockey Championships – Division II
- 2010 World Junior Ice Hockey Championships – Division III
