= Stéphane Roy (ice hockey, born 1976) =

Ice hockey player

- Born: January 26, 1976 (age 50) Sainte-Martine, Quebec, Canada
- Height: 5 ft 11 in (180 cm)
- Weight: 191 lb (87 kg; 13 st 9 lb)
- Position: Centre
- Shot: Left
- Played for: Worcester IceCats; Quebec Citadelles; Bracknell Bees; HC Alleghe; EC VSV; SC Langnau; HC Fribourg-Gottéron
- NHL draft: 68th overall, 1994; St. Louis Blues
- Playing career: 1996–2017

Stéphane Roy (born 26 January 1976) is a Canadian former professional ice hockey centre.

== Career ==
Roy was born in Sainte-Martine, Quebec. He played junior hockey in the Quebec Major Junior Hockey League for the Val-d'Or Foreurs from 1993 to 1996.

== Career ==
Roy was drafted 68th overall by the St. Louis Blues in the 1994 NHL entry draft and played three seasons in the American Hockey League (AHL) for the Worcester IceCats, the Blues' affiliate, as well as one season with the Quebec Citadelles.

Roy moved to Europe in 2000, beginning in the United Kingdom's Ice Hockey Superleague with the Bracknell Bees. He then spent a season in Italy's Serie A for HC Alleghe before moving to Switzerland's National League B where he spent eleven seasons, four with EHC Visp and seven with HC Ajoie.

== Career statistics ==
| | | | Regular season | | | | | Playoffs |
| Season | Team | League | GP | G | A | Pts | PIM | GP | G | A | Pts | PIM |
|---|---|---|---|---|---|---|---|---|---|---|---|---|
| 1992–93 | Lac-St-Louis Lions | QMAAA | 42 | 38 | 25 | 63 | 58 | 7 | 2 | 12 | 14 | 0 |
| 1993–94 | Val-d'Or Foreurs | QMJHL | 72 | 25 | 28 | 53 | 116 | — | — | — | — | — |
| 1994–95 | Val-d'Or Foreurs | QMJHL | 68 | 19 | 52 | 71 | 113 | — | — | — | — | — |
| 1995–96 | Val-d'Or Foreurs | QMJHL | 62 | 43 | 72 | 115 | 89 | 13 | 9 | 15 | 24 | 10 |
| 1995–96 | Worcester IceCats | AHL | 1 | 0 | 0 | 0 | 2 | — | — | — | — | — |
| 1996–97 | Worcester IceCats | AHL | 66 | 24 | 23 | 47 | 57 | 5 | 2 | 0 | 2 | 4 |
| 1997–98 | Worcester IceCats | AHL | 77 | 21 | 27 | 48 | 95 | 10 | 4 | 4 | 8 | 10 |
| 1998–99 | Worcester IceCats | AHL | 64 | 16 | 28 | 44 | 41 | 4 | 0 | 2 | 2 | 2 |
| 1999–00 | Quebec Citadelles | AHL | 73 | 13 | 28 | 41 | 43 | 3 | 1 | 1 | 2 | 0 |
| 2000–01 | Bracknell Bees | BISL | 47 | 22 | 20 | 42 | 67 | 7 | 1 | 2 | 3 | 4 |
| 2001–02 | HC Alleghe | Italy | 39 | 36 | 37 | 73 | 34 | 9 | 3 | 4 | 7 | 8 |
| 2002–03 | EHC Visp | NLB | 38 | 15 | 22 | 37 | 34 | 15 | 15 | 10 | 25 | 10 |
| 2003–04 | EHC Visp | NLB | 45 | 29 | 45 | 74 | 34 | 2 | 0 | 0 | 0 | 0 |
| 2003–04 | Villacher SV | EBEL | 8 | 3 | 3 | 6 | 4 | 8 | 2 | 9 | 11 | 8 |
| 2004–05 | EHC Visp | NLB | 44 | 24 | 36 | 60 | 67 | 7 | 5 | 4 | 9 | 10 |
| 2004–05 | SC Langnau | NLA | — | — | — | — | — | 1 | 1 | 0 | 1 | 2 |
| 2005–06 | EHC Visp | NLB | 37 | 20 | 41 | 61 | 40 | 7 | 3 | 3 | 6 | 24 |
| 2005–06 | Villacher SV | EBEL | — | — | — | — | — | 11 | 4 | 11 | 15 | 10 |
| 2005–06 | HC Fribourg-Gottéron | NLA | 2 | 0 | 1 | 1 | 0 | — | — | — | — | — |
| 2006–07 | HC Ajoie | NLB | 45 | 29 | 52 | 81 | 52 | 6 | 5 | 4 | 9 | 10 |
| 2007–08 | HC Ajoie | NLB | 49 | 26 | 49 | 75 | 48 | 14 | 8 | 12 | 20 | 30 |
| 2008–09 | HC Ajoie | NLB | 47 | 33 | 44 | 77 | 108 | 10 | 7 | 7 | 14 | 18 |
| 2009–10 | HC Ajoie | NLB | 46 | 28 | 38 | 66 | 52 | 7 | 2 | 7 | 9 | 6 |
| 2010–11 | HC Ajoie | NLB | 44 | 25 | 42 | 67 | 38 | 7 | 3 | 1 | 4 | 8 |
| 2011–12 | HC Ajoie | NLB | 43 | 24 | 25 | 49 | 54 | 7 | 3 | 4 | 7 | 0 |
| 2012–13 | HC Ajoie | NLB | 35 | 15 | 25 | 40 | 30 | 12 | 7 | 5 | 12 | 8 |
| 2013–14 | Sorel-Tracy Éperviers | LNAH | 33 | 19 | 24 | 43 | 24 | 5 | 3 | 2 | 5 | 8 |
| 2014–15 | Sorel-Tracy Éperviers | LNAH | 38 | 14 | 36 | 50 | 37 | 18 | 7 | 13 | 20 | 20 |
| 2015–16 | Sorel-Tracy Éperviers | LNAH | 16 | 6 | 8 | 14 | 16 | 20 | 4 | 8 | 12 | 26 |
| 2016–17 | Sorel-Tracy Éperviers | LNAH | 34 | 10 | 15 | 25 | 32 | 12 | 2 | 0 | 2 | 20 |
| AHL totals | | | 281 | 74 | 106 | 180 | 238 | 22 | 7 | 7 | 14 | 16 |
