= Jannik Fischer =

Swiss ice hockey player (born 1990)

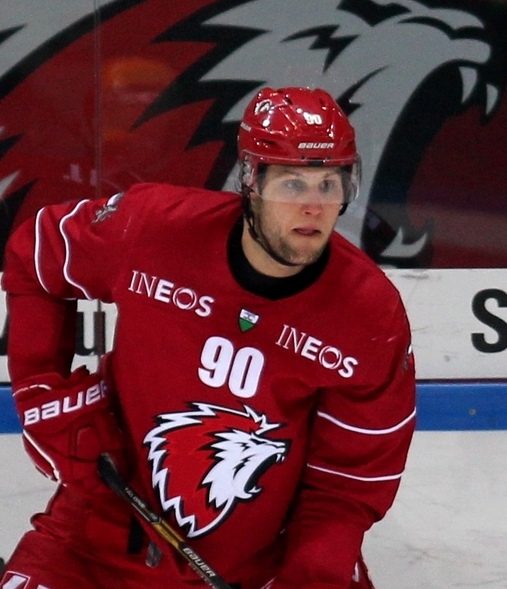
- Born: June 26, 1990 (age 35) Baar, Switzerland
- Height: 6 ft 1 in (185 cm)
- Weight: 209 lb (95 kg; 14 st 13 lb)
- Position: Defence
- Shot: Left
- Played for: EV Zug; Lausanne HC; HC Ambrì-Piotta; HC Ajoie
- Playing career: 2007–2026

Jannik Fischer (born June 29, 1990) is a former Swiss professional ice hockey defenceman. Spending his entire career in the Swiss National League, Fischer played for EV Zug, Lausanne HC, HC Ambrì-Piotta, and HC Ajoie.

Fischer made his National League A debut playing with EV Zug during the 2008–09 NLA season.

== Career statistics ==
=== Regular season and playoffs ===
			Regular season					Playoffs
Season	Team	League	GP	G	A	Pts	PIM	GP	G	A	Pts	PIM
2007–08	EHC Chur	NLB	18	0	0	0	16	—	—	—	—	—
2008–09	EV Zug	NLA	17	0	0	0	2	10	0	0	0	0
2008–09	SC Langenthal	NLB	2	0	0	0	0	—	—	—	—	—
2009–10	EV Zug	NLA	18	0	0	0	2	3	0	0	0	0
2009–10	SC Langenthal	NLB	9	1	1	2	8	—	—	—	—	—
2010–11	Lausanne HC	NLB	40	0	4	4	16	17	0	1	1	4
2011–12	Lausanne HC	NLB	45	1	10	11	16	15	0	0	0	8
2012–13	Lausanne HC	NLB	50	2	3	5	28	15	1	3	4	6
2013–14	Lausanne HC	NLA	50	0	3	3	16	6	0	0	0	0
2014–15	Lausanne HC	NLA	50	2	2	4	22	6	0	0	0	0
2015–16	Lausanne HC	NLA	40	0	1	1	30	6	2	0	2	0
2016–17	Lausanne HC	NLA	50	2	3	5	18	4	0	1	1	4
2017–18	Lausanne HC	NL	50	0	4	4	26	6	0	1	1	2
2018–19	HC Ambrì-Piotta	NL	50	0	2	2	18	5	2	0	2	14
2019–20	HC Ambrì-Piotta	NL	49	1	3	4	52	—	—	—	—	—
2020–21	HC Ambrì-Piotta	NL	50	2	6	8	74	—	—	—	—	—
2021–22	HC Ambrì-Piotta	NL	45	0	4	4	24	3	0	0	0	4
2022–23	HC Ambrì-Piotta	NL	51	2	3	5	50	—	—	—	—	—
2023–24	HC Ajoie	NL	44	0	2	2	16	—	—	—	—	—
2024–25	HC Ajoie	NL	50	0	2	2	51	6	0	1	1	2
2025–26	HC Ajoie	NL	47	1	5	6	46	—	—	—	—	—
NL totals			661	10	40	50	447	55	4	3	7	26

=== International ===
Year	Team	Event	Result	GP	G	A	Pts	PIM
2008	Switzerland	U18	8th	6	0	1	1	4
2009	Switzerland	WCJ D1	1st place, gold medalist(s)	5	0	0	0	0
2010	Switzerland	WJC	4th	7	0	0	0	2
Junior totals				18	0	1	1	6
