= Adrien Plavsic =

Canadian ice hockey defenceman (born 1970)

- Born: January 13, 1970 (age 56) Montreal, Quebec, Canada
- Height: 6 ft 0 in (183 cm)
- Weight: 198 lb (90 kg; 14 st 2 lb)
- Position: Defence
- Shot: Left
- Played for: St. Louis Blues; Vancouver Canucks; Tampa Bay Lightning; Mighty Ducks of Anaheim; Revier Lions; ZSC Lions; EHC Basel; Lausanne HC
- National team: Canada
- NHL draft: 30th overall, 1988; St. Louis Blues
- Playing career: 1989–2008; 2010–2012
Medal record
Men's ice hockey
Representing Canada
Olympic Games
Silver medal – second place	1992 Albertville	Team competition

Adrien Plavsic (born January 13, 1970) is a Canadian former professional ice hockey defenceman who played eight seasons in the National Hockey League (NHL).

== Biography ==
As a youth, Plavsic played in the 1982 and 1983 Quebec International Pee-Wee Hockey Tournaments with a minor ice hockey team from the North Shore of Montreal. Although being highly-ranked for the Quebec Major Junior Hockey League draft, Plavsic chose a scholarship at the University of New Hampshire as a 17 year old. Following his freshman year he was drafted 30th overall by St. Louis in the 1988 NHL entry draft, and chose to join the Canadian National team in 1988-89. In the NHL, he played for the St. Louis Blues, Vancouver Canucks, Tampa Bay Lightning and the Mighty Ducks of Anaheim. Plavsic played 214 regular season games in the NHL, scoring 16 goals and 56 assists for 72 points and clocking up 151 penalty minutes. He played in Switzerland's Nationalliga A from 1998 to 2008. He has coached mostly in Switzerland since retiring, including a two year stint as a player-assistant coach for EHC Basel in 2010–11 and 2011–12.

In 2005, he became Swiss citizen through marriage.

== Career statistics ==
=== Regular season and playoffs ===
			Regular season					Playoffs
Season	Team	League	GP	G	A	Pts	PIM	GP	G	A	Pts	PIM
1987–88	University of New Hampshire	HE	30	5	6	11	45	—	—	—	—	—
1988–89	Canada	Intl	62	5	10	15	25	—	—	—	—	—
1989–90	Peoria Rivermen	IHL	51	7	14	21	87	—	—	—	—	—
1989–90	St. Louis Blues	NHL	4	0	1	1	2	—	—	—	—	—
1989–90	Milwaukee Admirals	IHL	3	1	2	3	14	6	1	3	4	6
1989–90	Vancouver Canucks	NHL	11	3	2	5	8	—	—	—	—	—
1990–91	Vancouver Canucks	NHL	48	2	10	12	62	—	—	—	—	—
1991–92	Vancouver Canucks	NHL	16	1	9	10	14	13	1	7	8	4
1991–92	Canada	Intl	38	7	8	15	44	—	—	—	—	—
1992–93	Vancouver Canucks	NHL	57	6	21	27	53	—	—	—	—	—
1993–94	Hamilton Canucks	AHL	2	0	0	0	0	—	—	—	—	—
1993–94	Vancouver Canucks	NHL	47	1	9	10	6	—	—	—	—	—
1994–95	Vancouver Canucks	NHL	3	0	1	1	4	—	—	—	—	—
1994–95	Tampa Bay Lightning	NHL	15	2	1	3	4	—	—	—	—	—
1995–96	Atlanta Knights	IHL	68	5	34	39	32	3	0	1	1	4
1995–96	Tampa Bay Lightning	NHL	7	1	2	3	6	—	—	—	—	—
1996–97	Long Beach Ice Dogs	IHL	69	7	28	35	86	18	0	9	9	10
1996–97	Mighty Ducks of Anaheim	NHL	6	0	0	0	2	—	—	—	—	—
1997–98	Revierlöwen Oberhausen	DEL	36	4	15	19	28	—	—	—	—	—
1998–99	ZSC Lions	NDA	28	3	21	24	18	—	—	—	—	—
1999–2000	ZSC Lions	NLA	42	12	16	28	83	15	4	6	10	18
2000–01	ZSC Lions	NLA	39	7	19	26	36	13	2	5	7	10
2001–02	ZSC Lions	NLA	33	8	4	12	20	—	—	—	—	—
2003–04	EHC Basel	NLA	41	7	10	17	32	—	—	—	—	—
2004–05	EHC Basel	NLB	15	3	9	12	4	—	—	—	—	—
2004–05	Lausanne HC	NLA	2	0	0	0	2	—	—	—	—	—
2005–06	EHC Basel	NLA	39	2	16	18	58	5	1	0	1	6
2006–07	EHC Basel	NLA	41	5	13	18	66	—	—	—	—	—
2007–08	EHC Basel	NLA	5	0	0	0	10	—	—	—	—	—
2010–11	EHC Basel	NLB	44	6	15	21	32	—	—	—	—	—
2011–12	EHC Basel	NLB	20	2	7	9	6	—	—	—	—	—
IHL totals			191	20	78	98	219	27	1	13	14	20
NHL totals			214	16	56	72	161	13	1	7	8	4
NDA/NLA totals			269	44	99	143	325	41	9	14	23	36

=== International ===
Year	Team	Event	GP	G	A	Pts	PIM
1990	Canada	WJC	7	0	1	1	8
1992	Canada	OG	8	0	2	2	0
