= 1931–32 Swiss International Ice Hockey Championship =

The 1931–32 Swiss International Ice Hockey Championship was the 17th edition of the international ice hockey championship in Switzerland. HC Davos won the championship by finishing first in the final round.

== First round ==
=== Eastern Series ===
==== Final ====
- HC Davos - EHC St. Moritz 6:2

=== Central Series ===
Pl.	Team	GP	W	T	L	Pts
1.	Grasshopper-Club Zürich	2	2	0	0	4
2.	Zürcher SC	2	1	0	1	2
3.	Akademischer EHC Zürich	2	0	0	2	0

=== Western Series ===
==== Semifinals ====
- Lycée Jaccard - HC Château-d’Œx 2:1
- HC Rosey Gstaad - Star Lausanne 6:0

==== Final ====
- HC Rosey Gstaad - Lycée Jaccard 6:1

== Final round ==
Pl.	Team	GP	W	T	L	Pts
1.	HC Davos	2	2	0	0	4
2.	Grasshopper-Club Zürich	2	1	0	1	2
3.	HC Rosey Gstaad	2	0	0	2	0
