= 1923–24 Swiss International Ice Hockey Championship =

The 1923–24 Swiss International Ice Hockey Championship was the ninth edition of the international ice hockey championship in Switzerland. HC Château-d'Oex won the championship by defeating HC Davos in the final.

== First round ==
=== Eastern Series ===
- EHC St. Moritz - HC Davos 2:1

Since EHC St. Moritz was unable to participate in the finals, their place was taken by HC Davos.

=== Western Series ===
==== Group 1 ====
Pl.	Team	GP	W	T	L	Pts
1.	HC Bellerive Vevey	2	2	0	0	4
2.	Villars HC	2	1	0	1	2
3.	Genève-Servette HC	2	0	0	2	0

==== Group 2 ====
Pl.	Team	GP	W	T	L	Pts
1.	HC Château-d'Oex	2	2	0	0	4
2.	HC Rosey Gstaad	2	1	0	1	2
3.	HC Lausanne	2	0	0	2	0

==== Final ====
- HC Château-d'Oex - HC Bellerive Vevey 4:2

== Final ==
The final was played on January 20, 1924, in Gstaad.

- HC Château-d'Oex - HC Davos 3:2
