= Aleksandr Tarasov =

Aleksandr Tarasov may refer to the following people:

- Alexander Tarasov (born 1958), Russian sociologist, politologist, culturologist, publicist, writer, and philosopher
- Alexander Tarasov-Rodionov (1885–1938), Russian writer
- Alexander Tarasov (figure skater) (born 1961), Russian pair skater
- Alexander Tarasov (ice hockey) (born 1990), Russian ice hockey defenceman
- Aleksandr Tarasov (footballer, born 1972), Russian football player
- Aleksandr Tarasov (footballer, born 2006), Russian football player
- Aleksandr Tarasov (pentathlete) (1927–1984), Soviet modern pentathlete
