= 1933–34 Swiss National Ice Hockey Championship =

The 1933–34 Swiss National Ice Hockey Championship was the 24th edition of the national ice hockey championship in Switzerland. HC Davos won the championship by finishing first in the final round.

== First round ==
=== Western Series ===
Pl.	Team	GP	W	T	L	Pts
1.	HC Chateaux-d'Oex	6	6	0	0	12
2.	SC Bern	6	4	0	2	8
3.	Star Lausanne	6	2	0	4	4
4.	Lycée Jaccard	6	0	0	6	0

=== Eastern Series ===
Pl.	Team	GP	W	T	L	Pts
1.	HC Davos	6	4	0	0	8
2.	EHC St. Moritz	6	2	0	2	4
3.	EHC Arosa	6	0	0	4	0

=== Central Series ===
Pl.	Team	GP	W	T	L	Pts
1.	Zürcher SC	6	3	0	1	6
2.	Grasshopper-Club Zürich	6	3	0	1	6
3.	Akademischer EHC Zürich	6	0	0	4	0

== Final round ==
Pl.	Team	GP	W	T	L	Pts
1.	HC Davos	2	2	0	0	4
2.	Zürcher SC	2	1	0	1	2
3.	HC Chateaux d'Oex	2	0	0	2	0
