= 1936–37 Swiss National Ice Hockey Championship =

The 1936–37 Swiss National Ice Hockey Championship was the 27th and final edition of the national ice hockey championship in Switzerland. HC Davos won the championship by finishing first in the final round.

== First round ==
=== Western Series ===
Pl.	Team	GP	W	T	L	Pts
1.	SC Bern	4	3	0	1	6
2.	EHC Basel	4	3	0	1	6
3.	HC Chateaux-d'Oex	4	0	0	4	0

=== Eastern Series ===
Pl.	Team	GP	W	T	L	Pts
1.	HC Davos	2	2	0	0	4
2.	EHC St. Moritz	2	0	0	2	0

=== Central Series ===
Pl.	Team	GP	W	T	L	Pts
1.	Zürcher SC	4	4	0	0	8
2.	Grasshopper-Club Zürich	4	1	1	2	3
3.	Akademischer EHC Zürich	4	0	1	3	1

== Final round ==
Pl.	Team	GP	W	T	L	Pts
1.	HC Davos	2	2	0	0	4
2.	Zürcher SC	2	1	0	1	2
3.	SC Bern	2	0	0	2	0
