= 1935–36 Swiss National Ice Hockey Championship =

The 1935–36 Swiss National Ice Hockey Championship was the 26th edition of the national ice hockey championship in Switzerland. Zürcher SC won the championship by defeating HC Davos in the final.

== First round ==
=== Western Series ===
| Pl. | Team | GP | W | T | L | Pts |
|---|---|---|---|---|---|---|
| 1. | HC Chateaux-d'Oex | 1 | 1 | 0 | 0 | 2 |
| 2. | Star Lausanne | 1 | 0 | 0 | 1 | 0 |

=== Eastern Series ===
| Pl. | Team | GP | W | T | L | Pts |
|---|---|---|---|---|---|---|
| 1. | HC Davos | 4 | 4 | 0 | 0 | 8 |
| 2. | EHC St. Moritz | 4 | 1 | 0 | 3 | 2 |
| 3. | EHC Arosa | 4 | 1 | 0 | 3 | 2 |

=== Central Series 1 ===
| Pl. | Team | GP | W | T | L | Pts |
|---|---|---|---|---|---|---|
| 1. | Zürcher SC | 4 | 3 | 0 | 1 | 6 |
| 2. | Grasshopper-Club Zürich | 4 | 2 | 0 | 2 | 4 |
| 3. | EHC Basel | 4 | 1 | 0 | 3 | 2 |

=== Central Series 2 ===
| Pl. | Team | GP | W | T | L | Pts |
|---|---|---|---|---|---|---|
| 1. | Akademischer EHC Zürich | 2 | 1 | 0 | 1 | 2 |
| 2. | SC Bern | 2 | 1 | 0 | 1 | 2 |

==== Final game ====
- Akademischer EHC Zürich - SC Bern 2:1

== Playoffs ==
=== Semifinals ===
- HC Davos - HC Chateaux-d'Oex
- Zürcher SC - Akademischer EHC Zürich 2:1

=== Final ===
- Zürcher SC - HC Davos 1:0 OT
