= 1928–29 Swiss International Ice Hockey Championship =

The 1928–29 Swiss International Ice Hockey Championship was the 14th edition of the international ice hockey championship in Switzerland. HC Davos won the championship by defeating Star Lausanne in the final.

== First round ==
=== Eastern Series ===
EHC St. Moritz opted not to participate in the International Championship.

- HC Davos - EHC St. Moritz 5:0 (Forfeit)

HC Davos qualified for the final.

=== Western Series ===
- Star Lausanne - HC Rosey Gstaad 0:8

HC Rosey Gstaad did not participate in the final due to issues with the National Championship Final. Star Lausanne qualified for the final as a result.

== Final ==
- HC Davos - Star Lausanne 9:0
