= 1931–32 Swiss National Ice Hockey Championship =

The 1931–32 Swiss National Ice Hockey Championship was the 22nd edition of the national ice hockey championship in Switzerland. HC Davos won the championship by defeating HC Châteaux-d'Oex in the final.

== First round ==
=== Eastern Series ===
==== Group 1 ====
HC Davos qualified for the Eastern Final as the only team in Group 1.

==== Group 2 ====
Pl.	Team	GP	W	T	L	Pts
1.	Zürcher SC	2	2	0	0	4
2.	Grasshopper-Club Zürich	2	1	0	1	2
3.	Akademischer EHC Zürich	2	0	0	2	0

==== Eastern Final ====
- Zürcher SC - HC Davos 2:4 OT

=== Western Series ===
==== Western Final ====
- HC Châteaux-d'Oex - Lausanne HC 2:0

== Final ==
- HC Davos - HC Châteaux-d'Oex 10:0
