= 1921–22 Swiss International Ice Hockey Championship =

The 1921–22 Swiss International Ice Hockey Championship was the seventh edition of the international ice hockey championship in Switzerland. HC Château-d’Œx won the championship, as EHC St. Moritz forfeited the final.

== First round ==
=== Eastern Series ===
==== Semifinals ====
- EHC St. Moritz - FC/HC Zürich 17:1
- HC Davos - Akademischer EHC Zürich 3:0

==== Final ====
- EHC St. Moritz - HC Davos 5:1

EHC St. Moritz qualified for the final.

=== Western Series ===
Pl.	Team	GP	W	T	L	Pts
1.	HC Château-d’Œx	2	2	0	0	4
2.	HC Rosey Gstaad	2	1	0	1	2
3.	Lausanne HC	2	0	0	2	0

== Final ==
The final was scheduled for February 12, 1922, in Gstaad. As EHC St. Moritz was unable to travel to Gstaad, the game was awarded to HC Château-d’Œx in a forfeit.

- HC Château-d’Œx - EHC St. Moritz 3:0 (Forfeit)
