= 1924–25 Swiss International Ice Hockey Championship =

The 1924–25 Swiss International Ice Hockey Championship was the 10th edition of the international ice hockey championship in Switzerland. HC Rosey Gstaad won the championship by defeating HC Davos in the final.

== First round ==
=== Eastern Series ===
Pl.	Team	GP	W	T	L	Pts
1.	HC Davos	2	2	0	0	4
2.	EHC St. Moritz	2	1	0	1	2
3.	Akademischer EHC Zürich	2	0	0	2	0

=== Western Series ===
Pl.	Team	GP	W	T	L	Pts
1.	HC Rosey Gstaad	2	2	0	0	4
2.	HC Bellerive Vevey	2	1	0	1	2
3.	HC Château-d'Oex	2	0	0	2	0

== Final ==
- HC Davos - HC Rosey Gstaad 1:2
