= 1932–33 Swiss International Ice Hockey Championship =

The 1932–33 Swiss International Ice Hockey Championship was the 18th and final edition of the international ice hockey championship in Switzerland. Grasshopper Club Zürich won the championship by finishing first in the final round.

== First round ==
=== Eastern Series ===
==== Final ====
- EHC St. Moritz - HC Davos 1:3

=== Central Series ===
Pl.	Team	GP	W	T	L	Pts
1.	Grasshopper Club Zürich	2	2	0	0	4
2.	Akademischer EHC Zürich	2	1	0	1	2
3.	Zürcher SC	2	0	0	2	0

=== Western Series ===
==== Semifinals ====
- Lycée Jaccard - Star Lausanne 2:0
- HC Château-d'Oex - HC Rosey Gstaad 0:3

==== Final ====
- HC Rosey Gstaad - HC Château-d'Oex 7:3

== Final round ==
Pl.	Team	GP	W	T	L	Pts
1.	Grasshopper Club Zürich	2	2	0	0	4
2.	HC Davos	2	1	0	1	2
3.	HC Rosey Gstaad	2	0	0	2	0
