= 1916–17 Swiss International Ice Hockey Championship =

Swiss sport competition

The 1916–17 Swiss International Ice Hockey Championship was the second edition of the international ice hockey championship in Switzerland. Seven teams participated in the championship, which was won by HC Les Avants, who defeated HC Servette A in the final.

== First round ==
=== Group 1 ===
| Pl. | Team | GP | W | T | L | Pts |
|---|---|---|---|---|---|---|
| 1. | HC Servette A | 3 | 3 | 0 | 0 | 6 |
| 2. | HC Caux | 3 | 1 | 0 | 2 | 2 |
| 3. | Akademischer EHC Zürich | 3 | 1 | 0 | 2 | 2 |
| 4. | HC Servette B | 3 | 1 | 0 | 2 | 2 |

=== Group 2 ===
| Pl. | Team | GP | W | T | L | Pts |
|---|---|---|---|---|---|---|
| 1. | HC Les Avants | 2 | 2 | 0 | 0 | 4 |
| 2. | Club des Patineurs Lausanne | 2 | 1 | 0 | 1 | 2 |
| 3. | Villars HC | 2 | 0 | 0 | 2 | 0 |

== Final ==
- HC Les Avants - HC Servette A 5:1
