= 1926–27 Swiss National Ice Hockey Championship =

The 1926–27 Swiss National Ice Hockey Championship was the 17th edition of the national ice hockey championship in Switzerland. HC Davos won the championship by defeating HC Rosey Gstaad in the final.

== First round ==
=== Eastern Series ===
- EHC St. Moritz - HC Davos 1:2

HC Davos qualified for the final.

=== Western Series ===
==== Semifinals ====
- HC Château-d’Œx - HC Caux 13:1
- HC Rosey Gstaad - Star Lausanne 15:0

==== Final ====
- HC Rosey Gstaad - HC Château-d’Œx 5:1

HC Rosey Gstaad qualified for the final.

== Final ==
- HC Rosey Gstaad - HC Davos 1:7
