= 1922–23 Swiss International Ice Hockey Championship =

Ice Hockey Championship

The 1922–23 Swiss International Ice Hockey Championship was the eighth edition of the international ice hockey championship in Switzerland. EHC St. Moritz won the championship by defeating HC Château-d'Oex in the final.

== First round ==
=== Eastern Series ===
- EHC St. Moritz - HC Davos 6:2

EHC St. Moritz qualified for the final.

=== Western Series ===
- HC Château-d'Oex - HC Rosey Gstaad 2:1

HC Château-d'Oex qualified for the final.

== Final ==
The final was played in Davos on February 11, 1923.

- EHC St. Moritz - HC Château-d'Oex 8:2
