= 1930–31 Swiss International Ice Hockey Championship =

The 1930–31 Swiss International Ice Hockey Championship was the 16th edition of the international ice hockey championship in Switzerland. HC Davos won the championship by defeating HC Rosey Gstaad in the final.

== First round ==
=== Eastern Series ===
==== Group 1 ====
Since EHC Arosa opted not to participate, only one game was played in Group 1.

- EHC St. Moritz- Lyceum Zuoz 6:0

==== Group 2 ====
===== Semifinals =====
- Zürcher SC - Akademischer EHC Zürich 4:3
- HC Davos - Akademischer EHC Zürich 5:0 Forfeit

===== Final =====
- HC Davos - Zürcher SC 11:1

==== Eastern Final ====
- HC Davos - EHC St. Moritz

=== Western Series ===
==== Semifinals ====
- Lycée Jaccard - HC Chateaux-d'Oex 2:0
- HC Rosey Gstaad - Star Lausanne 11:0

==== 3rd place game ====
- HC Chateaux-d'Oex - Star Lausanne 6:1

==== Final ====
- HC Rosey Gstaad-Lycée Jaccard 8:1

HC Rosey Gstaad qualified for the final.

== Final ==
- HC Davos - HC Rosey Gstaad 5:3
