= 1915–16 Swiss International Ice Hockey Championship =

Switzerland ice hockey championship

The 1915–16 Swiss International Ice Hockey Championship was the first edition of the international ice hockey championship in Switzerland. Six teams participated in the championship, which was won by Akademischer EHC Zürich, who defeated Club des Patineurs Lausanne in the final.

== First round ==
=== Group 1 ===
Pl.	Team	GP	W	T	L	Pts
1.	Club des Patineurs Lausanne	2	1	1	0	3
2.	HC Servette	2	1	0	1	2
3.	HC Rosey, Rolle	2	0	1	1	1

=== Group 2 ===
Pl.	Team	GP	W	T	L	Pts
1.	Akademischer EHC Zürich	2	2	0	0	4
2.	HC Les Avants	2	1	0	1	2
3.	HC La Villa	2	0	0	2	0

== Final ==
- Akademischer EHC Zürich - Club des Patineurs Lausanne 7:2
