= 1927–28 Swiss National Ice Hockey Championship =

The 1927–28 Swiss National Ice Hockey Championship was the 18th edition of the national ice hockey championship in Switzerland. EHC St. Moritz won the championship as HC Rosey Gstaad forfeited the final.

== First round ==
=== Eastern Series ===
- HC Davos - EHC St. Moritz 3:4 OT

EHC St. Moritz qualified for the final.

=== Western Series ===
- HC Rosey Gstaad - HC Château-d’Œx 2:0

HC Rosey Gstaad qualified for the final.

== Final ==
- EHC St. Moritz - HC Rosey Gstaad 5:0 Forfeit
