= 1928–29 Swiss National Ice Hockey Championship =

The 1928–29 Swiss National Ice Hockey Championship was the 19th edition of the national ice hockey championship in Switzerland. HC Davos won the championship as HC Rosey Gstaad forfeited the final.

== First round ==
=== Eastern Series ===
HC Davos qualified for the final.

=== Western Series ===
HC Rosey Gstaad qualified for the final.

== Final ==
- HC Davos - HC Rosey Gstaad 5:0 Forfeit
