= 1920–21 Swiss International Ice Hockey Championship =

The 1920–21 Swiss International Ice Hockey Championship was the sixth edition of the international ice hockey championship in Switzerland. HC Rosey Gstaad won the championship by defeating HC Bellerive Vevey in the final.

== Championship ==
=== Semifinals ===
- HC Rosey Gstaad - EHC St. Moritz 6:1
- HC Bellerive Vevey - HC Château-d'Oex 3:1

=== Final ===
- HC Rosey Gstaad - HC Bellerive Vevey 8:1
