= 1918–19 Swiss International Ice Hockey Championship =

Fourth international ice hockey championship in Switzerland

The 1918–19 Swiss International Ice Hockey Championship was the fourth edition of the international ice hockey championship in Switzerland. Six teams participated in the championship, which was won by HC Rosey Gstaad, who defeated HC Bellerive Vevey in the final.

== First round ==
=== Group 1 ===
Pl.	Team	GP	W	T	L	Pts
1.	HC Bellerive Vevey	2	2	0	0	4
2.	HC Bern	2	1	0	1	2
3.	HC Servette	2	0	0	2	0

=== Group 2 ===
Pl.	Team	GP	W	T	L	Pts
1.	HC Rosey Gstaad	2	2	0	0	4
2.	Club des Patineurs Lausanne	2	1	0	1	2
3.	HC Caux	2	0	0	2	0

== Final ==
- HC Rosey Gstaad - HC Bellerive Vevey 2:0
