= 1911–12 Swiss National Ice Hockey Championship =

The 1911–12 Swiss National Ice Hockey Championship was the fourth edition of the national ice hockey championship in Switzerland. Six teams participated in the championship, which was won by HC Les Avants, who defeated Club des Patineurs Lausanne in the final.

== First round ==
=== Group 1 ===
Pl.	Team	GP	W	T	L	Pts
1.	HC Les Avants	2	2	0	0	4
2.	SC Engelberg	2	0	1	1	1
3.	Akademischer EHC Zürich	2	0	1	1	1

=== Group 2 ===
Pl.	Team	GP	W	T	L	Pts
1.	Club des Patineurs Lausanne	2	2	0	0	4
2.	HC Bellerive Vevey	2	0	1	1	1
3.	Genève-Servette HC	2	0	1	1	1

== Final ==
- HC Les Avants - Club des Patineurs Lausanne 2:1
