= 1927–28 Swiss International Ice Hockey Championship =

The 1927–28 Swiss International Ice Hockey Championship was the 13th edition of the international ice hockey championship in Switzerland. HC Rosey Gstaad won the championship by defeating HC Davos in the final.

== First round ==
=== Eastern Series ===
- HC St. Moritz - HC Davos 1:3

HC Davos qualified for the final.

=== Western Series ===
==== Semifinals ====
- HC Rosey Gstaad - Star Lausanne 14:1
- HC Château-d'Oex - HC La Chaux-de-Fonds 6:2

==== Final ====
- HC Château-d'Oex - HC Rosey Gstaad 1:13

HC Rosey Gstaad qualified for the final.

== Final ==
- HC Rosey Gstaad - HC Davos 4:3
