= 1929–30 Swiss International Ice Hockey Championship =

The 1929–30 Swiss International Ice Hockey Championship was the 15th edition of the international ice hockey championship in Switzerland. HC Davos won the championship by defeating HC Rosey Gstaad in the final.

== First round ==
=== Eastern Series ===
==== Semifinal ====
- Akademischer EHC Zürich - Lyceum Zuoz 2:1

==== Final ====
- HC Davos - Akademischer EHC Zürich 14:1

HC Davos qualified for the final.

==== Semifinals ====
- HC Rosey Gstaad - Lycée Jaccard 8:1
- HC Château-d’Œx - Star Lausanne 2:0

==== Final ====
HC Rosey Gstaad - HC Château-d’Œx 1:0

HC Rosey Gstaad qualified for the final.

== Final ==
- HC Rosey Gstaad - HC Davos 1:4
