= 1915–16 Swiss National Ice Hockey Championship =

The 1915–16 Swiss National Ice Hockey Championship was the sixth edition of the national ice hockey championship in Switzerland. HC Bern won the championship by defeating Club des Patineurs Lausanne in the final.

== First round ==
=== Eastern Series ===
- Akademischer EHC Zürich - HC Bern 2:5

HC Bern qualified for the final.

=== Western Series ===
- CP Lausanne - HC Les Avants 4:1
- CP Lausanne - Genève-Servette HC 5:2
- HC Les Avants - Genève-Servette HC 6:4

Pl.	Team	GP	W	T	L	G	Pts
1.	Club des Patineurs Lausanne	2	2	0	0	9:3	4
2.	HC Les Avants	2	1	0	1	7:8	2
3.	Genève-Servette HC	2	0	0	2	6:11	0

== Final ==
- HC Bern - Club des Patineurs Lausanne 7:1
