= 1926–27 Swiss International Ice Hockey Championship =

The 1926–27 Swiss International Ice Hockey Championship was the 12th edition of the international ice hockey championship in Switzerland. HC Davos won the championship by defeating HC Rosey Gstaad in the final.

== First round ==
=== Eastern Series ===
- EHC St. Moritz - HC Davos 3:3 OT

The re-play of the game was not contested, and was awarded to HC Davos.

- HC Davos - EHC St. Moritz 3:0 (Forfeit)

HC Davos qualified for the final.

=== Western Series ===
- HC Rosey Gstaad - HC Château-d'Oex 3:2 OT

HC Rosey Gstaad qualified for the final.

== Final ==
The final was played in Davos on February 20, 1927.

- HC Davos - HC Rosey Gstaad 2:0
