= 1925–26 Swiss International Ice Hockey Championship =

The 1925–26 Swiss International Ice Hockey Championship was the 11th edition of the international ice hockey championship in Switzerland. The championship was not awarded, as the final between HC Rosey Gstaad and HC Davos was not contested.

== First round ==
=== Eastern Series ===
- HC St. Moritz - HC Davos 1:4

HC Davos qualified for the final.

=== Western Series ===
- HC Rosey Gstaad - HC Château-d'Oex 5:1

HC Rosey Gstaad qualified for the final.

== Final ==
- HC Rosey Gstaad - HC Davos 0:0 (not played)
