= 1923–24 Swiss National Ice Hockey Championship =

The 1923–24 Swiss National Ice Hockey Championship was the 14th edition of the national ice hockey championship in Switzerland. HC Rosey Gstaad won the championship as EHC St. Moritz forfeited the final.

== First round ==
=== Eastern Series ===
- EHC St. Moritz - HC Davos 4:3 OT

EHC St. Moritz qualified for the final.

=== Western Series ===
- HC Château-d’Œx - HC Rosey Gstaad 3:7

HC Rosey Gstaad qualified for the final.

== Final ==
- EHC St. Moritz - HC Rosey Gstaad 0:3 Forfeit
