= 1916–17 Swiss National Ice Hockey Championship =

The 1916–17 Swiss National Ice Hockey Championship was the seventh edition of the national ice hockey championship in Switzerland. HC Bern won the championship by defeating Genève-Servette HC in the final.

== First round ==
=== Eastern Series ===
HC Bern qualified for the final.

=== Western Series ===
Genève-Servette HC qualified for the final.

== Final ==
- HC Bern - Genève-Servette HC 3:2
