= 1912–13 Swiss National Ice Hockey Championship =

The 1912–13 Swiss National Ice Hockey Championship was the fifth edition of the national ice hockey championship in Switzerland. Four teams participated in the championship, which was won by HC Levants, who finished first in the final standings.

== Final standings ==
Pl.	Team	GP	W	T	L	Pts
1.	HC Les Avants	2	2	0	0	4
2.	Club des Patineurs Lausanne	2	1	0	1	2
3.	Akademischer EHC Zürich	2	0	1	1	1
4.	HC Bellerive Vevey	2	0	1	1	1
