= 1919–20 Swiss National Ice Hockey Championship =

The 1919–20 Swiss National Ice Hockey Championship was the 10th edition of the national ice hockey championship in Switzerland. HC Bellerive Vevey won the championship as Akademischer EHC Zürich forfeited the final.

== First round ==
=== Eastern Series ===
- Akademischer EHC Zürich – SC Engelberg 2:0

Akademischer EHC Zürich qualified for the final.

=== Western Series ===
- HC Bellerive Vevey – HC Château-d'Oex 7:0

HC Bellerive Vevey qualified for the final.

== Final ==
- HC Bellerive Vevey – Akademischer EHC Zürich 3:0 Forfeit
