= 1920–21 Swiss National Ice Hockey Championship =

Ice hockey tournament results

The 1920–21 Swiss National Ice Hockey Championship was the 11th edition of the national ice hockey championship in Switzerland. HC Rosey Gstaad won the championship by defeating Akademischer EHC Zürich in the final.

== First round ==
=== Eastern Series ===
Pl.	Team	GP	W	T	L	Pts
1.	Akademischer EHC Zürich	2	2	0	0	4
2.	SC Engelberg	2	1	0	1	2
3.	FC/HC Zürich	2	0	0	2	0

=== Western Series ===
==== Semifinals ====
- HC Bellerive Vevey - HC La Villa 2:1
- HC Rosey Gstaad - HC Château-d'Oex 2:1

==== Final ====
- HC Rosey Gstaad - HC Bellerive Vevey 7:0

HC Rosey Gstaad qualified for the final.

== Final ==
- HC Rosey Gstaad - Akademischer EHC Zürich 12:6
