= 1924–25 Swiss National Ice Hockey Championship =

The 1924–25 Swiss National Ice Hockey Championship was the 15th edition of the national ice hockey championship in Switzerland. HC Rosey Gstaad won the championship by defeating HC Davos in the final.

== First round ==
=== Eastern Series ===
- EHC St. Moritz - HC Davos

HC Davos qualified for the final.

=== Western Series ===
- HC Château-d’Œx - HC Rosey Gstaad 1:6

HC Rosey Gstaad qualified for the final.

== Final ==
- HC Davos - HC Rosey Gstaad 1:9
