= 1925–26 Swiss National Ice Hockey Championship =

The 1925–26 Swiss National Ice Hockey Championship was the 16th edition of the national ice hockey championship in Switzerland. HC Davos won the championship by defeating HC Rosey Gstaad in the final.

== First round ==
=== Eastern Series ===
- HC Davos - Akademischer EHC Zürich 7:0

HC Davos qualified for the final.

=== Western Series ===
- HC Rosey Gstaad - HC Château-d’Œx 6:1

HC Rosey Gstaad qualified for the final.

== Final ==
- HC Davos - HC Rosey Gstaad 4:2
