= Nazem Kadri =

Canadian ice hockey player (born 1990)

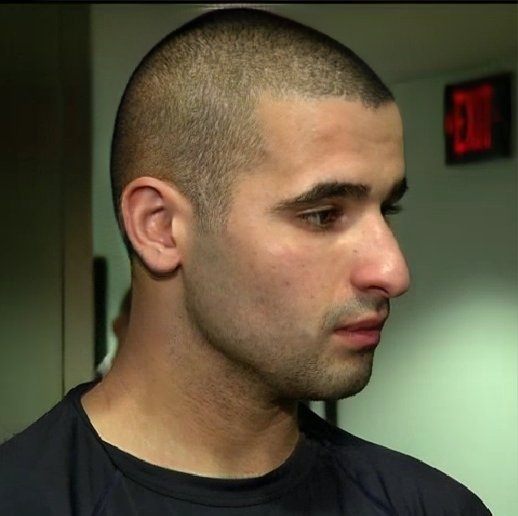
- Kadri in 2012
- Born: October 6, 1990 (age 36) London, Ontario, Canada
- Height: 6 ft 0 in (183 cm)
- Weight: 195 lb (88 kg; 13 st 13 lb)
- Position: Centre
- Shoots: Left
- NHL team Former teams: Colorado Avalanche; Toronto Maple Leafs; Calgary Flames
- National team: Canada
- NHL draft: 7th overall, 2009; Toronto Maple Leafs
- Playing career: 2010–present

Nazem Kadri (Arabic: ناظم القادري; born October 6, 1990) is a Canadian professional ice hockey player who is a centre for the Colorado Avalanche of the National Hockey League (NHL).

Kadri was drafted by the Toronto Maple Leafs seventh overall in the 2009 NHL entry draft. He played his junior career in the Ontario Hockey League (OHL), first with the Kitchener Rangers and then the London Knights. He won the J. Ross Robertson Cup with Kitchener and was part of the Rangers team that lost to the Spokane Chiefs in the final of the 2008 Memorial Cup. Kadri won the Stanley Cup with the Avalanche in 2022, becoming the first Muslim player to hoist the trophy.

Kadri has represented Canada internationally. He won a silver medal with Canada junior team in the 2010 World Junior Championships, where they lost in the final to the United States 6–5.

== Early life ==
Kadri was born on October 6, 1990, in London, Ontario, the second of five children and the only son born to Samir and Suhayla Kadri. His grandparents were born in Kfar Danis, a mixed Muslim–Christian village in Lebanon, and moved to Ontario when Samir was four years old. Samir wanted to play hockey during his adolescence, but his family could not afford for their son to play. When Nazem was born, his father decided that he should have the opportunity to play the sport. Kadri began ice skating at the age of two, joined his first hockey team when he was four years old, and was playing at the elite level within the next two years. The Kadri family also attended National Hockey League (NHL) games; despite living in Southwestern Ontario, they supported the Montreal Canadiens.

Kadri was a successful hockey, basketball, and volleyball player, first at Jack Chambers Public School and later at A. B. Lucas Secondary School. By the end of his high school career, Kadri was fairly certain that he would be selected in the NHL draft. He also played minor ice hockey in the London Jr. Knights system of the Alliance Hockey organization, serving as team captain at multiple minor levels.

== Playing career ==
=== Junior ===
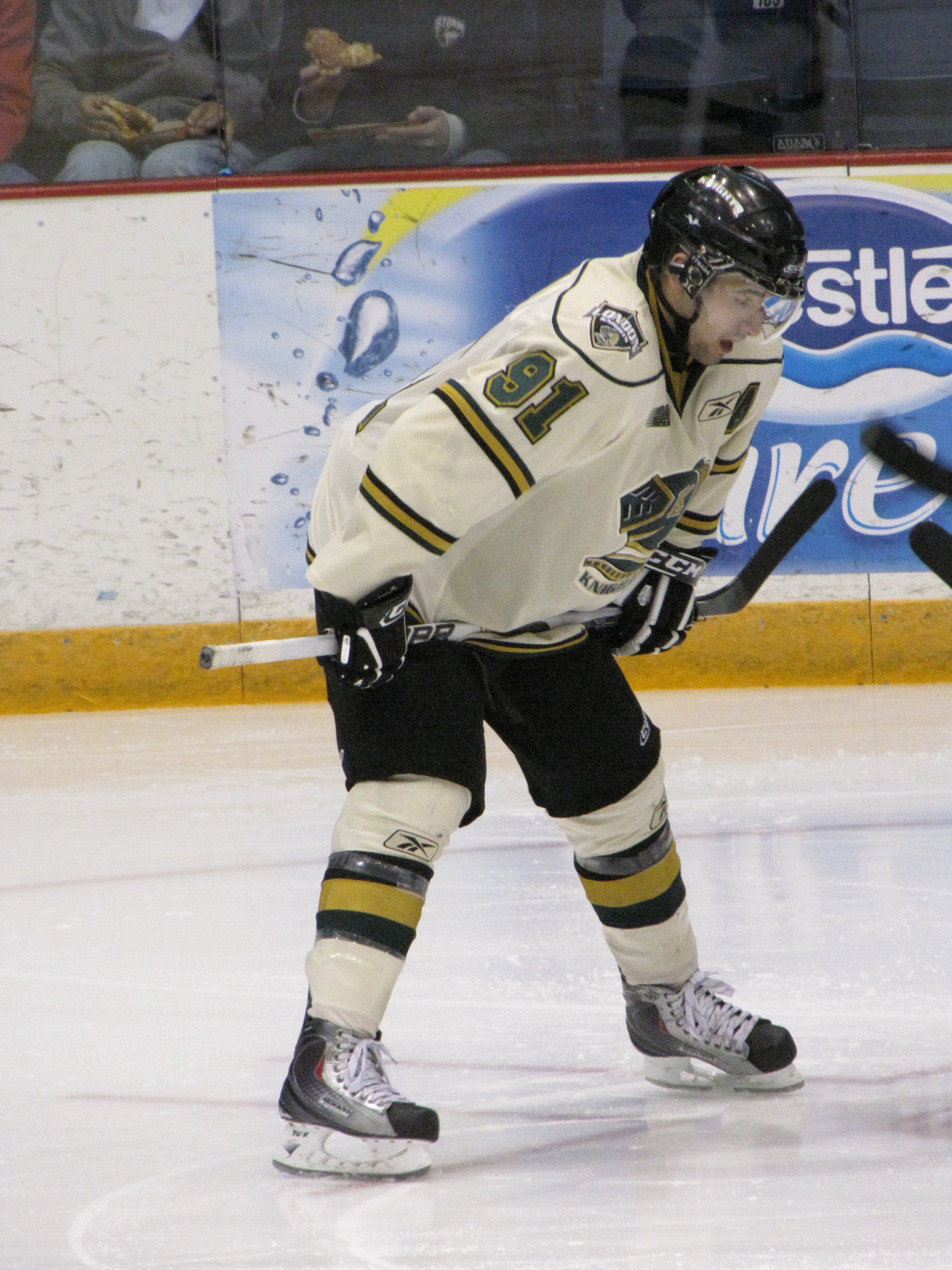
Kadri played with the London Knights for his final two seasons in juniors.

Kadri began his Ontario Hockey League (OHL) career with the Kitchener Rangers after being selected in the first round, 18th overall, of the 2006 OHL draft. During his second season in the OHL, he played 68 games, recording 25 goals and 40 assists for 65 points. During that year's playoffs, Kadri helped the Rangers to an OHL championship and a berth in the Memorial Cup final, where they lost to the Spokane Chiefs of the Western Hockey League (WHL).

After the 2007–08 season, Kadri was traded to the London Knights (his hometown team) in exchange for several draft picks. He played in 56 games for the Knights in 2008–09, recording 25 goals and 53 assists for 78 points. Kadri was sidelined during the 2008–09 season when he suffered a broken jaw, and was unable to play for Team OHL in the 2008 ADT Canada Russia Challenge. Kadri was later invited to Canada junior team's selection camp for the 2009 World Junior Championships but did not make the final roster. Also during the 2008–09 season, Kadri was chosen to play in the OHL All-Star Classic, where he suited-up for the Western Conference and scored one goal.

After the 2008–09 OHL season, Kadri was drafted by the Toronto Maple Leafs in the first round, seventh overall, of the 2009 NHL entry draft. He signed a three-year, entry-level contract with the club on July 6, 2009.

After being cut from the Maple Leafs, Kadri returned to play for the Knights in the OHL. He was selected to play for Team OHL in the 2009 Subway Super Series (renamed from the ADT Canada Russia Challenge). He was also selected to represent the Western Conference in the 2009–10 OHL All-Star Classic, his second appearance in the OHL's All-Star Game in as many seasons. On March 30, 2010, Kadri was named the Canadian Hockey League (CHL) Player of the Week after recording nine points (two goals and seven assists) in three games. The OHL named Kadri the league's Player of the Month for March 2010, a month in which he recorded 26 points (9 goals and 17 assists) in 10 games.

==== Toronto Maple Leafs (2009–2019) ====
Kadri attended training camp with the Maple Leafs prior to the 2009–10 season. He played in six pre-season games with the club, in which he recorded three goals and two assists. Then-Toronto head coach Ron Wilson had said prior to training camp that Kadri would need to be one of the team's top-six forwards to make the club; Kadri was ultimately returned to the Knights prior to the start of the NHL regular season. Due to injuries to forwards Christian Hanson and Fredrik Sjöström, Kadri was called-up to the Maple Leafs under an emergency basis, making his NHL debut on February 8, 2010, against the San Jose Sharks. He did not register any points and finished with a −1 plus-minus rating while playing on a line with fellow rookie Viktor Stålberg and veteran Lee Stempniak. This was a one-game-only call-up, and he subsequently returned to the London Knights following the game. Ron Wilson said that he would most likely be with the Maple Leafs for the 2010–11 season, though this was in doubt after comments made by both Wilson and then-Maple Leafs general manager Brian Burke during the pre-season, indicating that Kadri had not played to the level they expected and was "running out of time" to prove himself.

In addition, Burke was traditionally a strong supporter of rookies gaining experience at the American Hockey League (AHL) level prior to NHL careers. Kadri was included in the Maple Leafs' last round of cuts, and was subsequently sent to the AHL's Toronto Marlies for the start of the season. However, on November 12, Kadri was called-up by the Maple Leafs (along with fellow prospect Keith Aulie). On November 16, in a game against the Nashville Predators, Kadri recorded his first NHL point, assisting on a goal by Kris Versteeg. Two days later, on November 18, Kadri recorded his first multi-point night with two assists in a game against the New Jersey Devils. On March 19, 2011, against goaltender Tim Thomas of the Boston Bruins, Kadri scored his first career NHL goal.

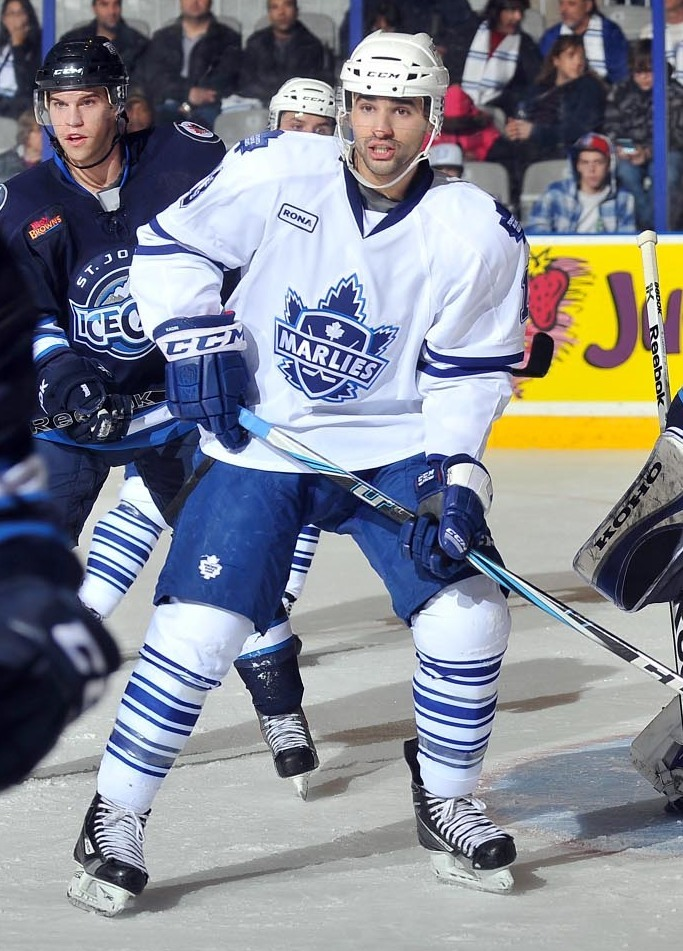
Kadri with the Toronto Marlies in February 2012

Kadri was named to the AHL All-Star Game in 2012.

Prior to 2012–13 season, Kadri began training under former NHL player and Maple Leaf Gary Roberts over the summer to gain muscle and "play more explosively". On January 19, 2013, when NHL play resumed after the 2012–13 NHL lockout cancelled much of the first half of the scheduled regular season, Kadri made the starting roster for the Maple Leafs in their season opener against the Montreal Canadiens. He would score the first Maple Leafs goal of the season with a powerplay mark assisted by Phil Kessel against goaltender Carey Price. Kadri finished the game named the game's first star. One month later, on February 19, in a game against the Tampa Bay Lightning, Kadri had his first NHL fight, engaging with Tampa Bay defenceman Victor Hedman. With the Maple Leafs losing 4–1 late in the game, Hedman delivered a cross-check to the back of Kadri, who then confronted the 6 ft 6 in (1.98 m) defenceman. Punches were then exchanged before teammates and officials broke up the fight. On February 28, in a 5–4 win against the New York Islanders, Kadri scored his first career hat-trick. On March 30, he scored his second career hat-trick, and second of the season, in a 4–0 win over the Ottawa Senators. He would finish the season with 18 goals and 26 assists, finishing second only to Phil Kessel for the team lead in points and goals as the Maple Leafs as a team clinched the fifth seed in the East to cement a playoff spot for the first time since 2004. On May 4, Kadri scored his first Stanley Cup playoff point, recording an assist on a goal by Kessel after Kadri sprung him on a breakaway. On May 13, he scored his first playoff goal against the Boston Bruins in game 7. Despite the Leafs having a 4–1 goal lead half way in the third period of the seventh game, the Leafs would lose game seven to the fourth-seeded Bruins in overtime 5–4 with Bruins' centre Patrice Bergeron scoring the series winning goal in the extra overtime period.

On September 11, 2013, Kadri signed a new two-year, $5.8 million contract with Toronto. On November 13, Kadri delivered an elbow to the head of Minnesota Wild goaltender Niklas Bäckström. As a result, the NHL's Department of Player Safety issued Kadri a three-game suspension. During the 2013–14 season, his first full 82-game season, Kadri set career-highs in goals (20) and points (50).

Kadri was suspended twice during the 2014–15 season, the first internally by the organization for showing up late to a team practice; he received a three-game suspension. One week later, Kadri was suspended by the NHL: he received four games for illegally checking Edmonton Oilers forward Matt Fraser in the head. Despite these setbacks, Kadri recorded 39 points in 73 games to lead all Toronto centres in goals.

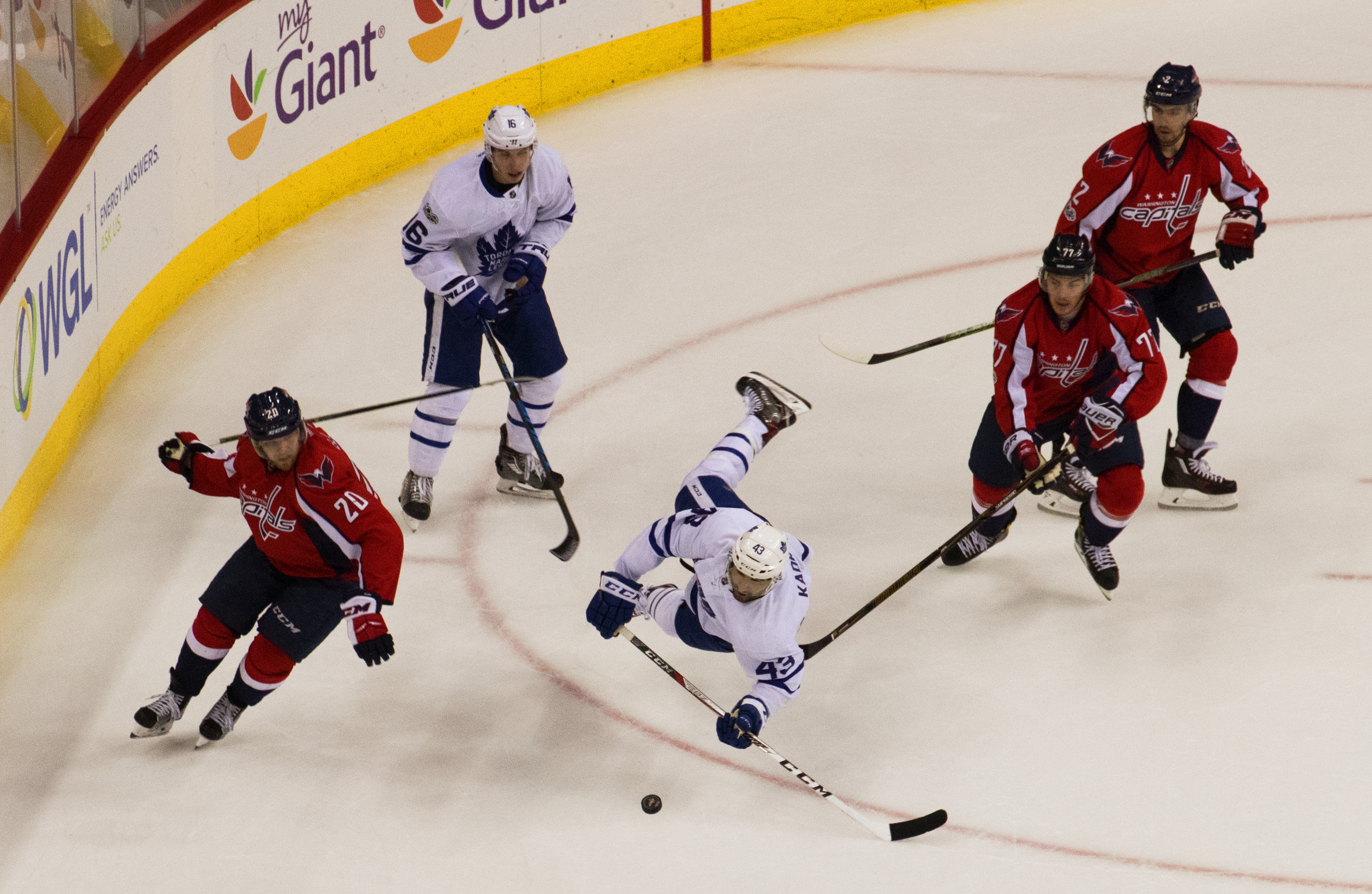
Kadri (centre) with the Toronto Maple Leafs in April 2017 during the 2017 Stanley Cup playoffs

In the subsequent off-season, he signed a new one-year, $4.1 million contract with Toronto. On April 1, 2016, Kadri was fined $5,000 by the NHL for his second and third diving infractions of the 2015–16 season. The first came on March 12, against the Ottawa Senators and the second on March 21, against the Calgary Flames. On April 4, 2016, Kadri was again suspended by the NHL after he delivered a cross-check to the head of Detroit Red Wings centre Luke Glendening. Kadri received a four-game suspension for the incident, effectively ending his season, and as a repeat offender under the NHL Collective Bargaining Agreement, he was also fined $200,000. Despite these misdemeanours, Kadri's play throughout the season was strongly praised by Leafs management, most notably head coach Mike Babcock and general manager Lou Lamoriello. Further, Kadri was heavily praised for his penalty drawing abilities; although he was always complimented on this skill, it received much more media attention this season, with Kadri setting a league-leading best 49 penalties drawn during the season. Additionally, Kadri led the Maple Leafs in various offensive categories, including points (45) and assists (28). On April 13, following the conclusion of Toronto's season, Kadri signed a new six-year, $27 million contract with the team.

On January 23, 2017, in a game against the Calgary Flames, Kadri scored his 100th career NHL goal. During the Maple Leafs' first-round series with the back-to-back Presidents' Trophy-winning Washington Capitals in the 2017 playoffs, Kadri played approximately 95 minutes of ice time throughout the series when Toronto were at even strength to help push the series to six games. He ended the series with two points, a goal and an assist, in all six games as Toronto were eliminated by the Capitals in six games.

During the 2017–18 season, Kadri scored his fourth career NHL hat-trick in a 6–3 win over the Columbus Blue Jackets on February 14, 2018. During Toronto's first-round series in the 2018 playoffs against the third-seeded Boston Bruins, Kadri was suspended three games for a hit on Bruins' forward Tommy Wingels in game 1. Toronto lost the series in seven games.

During Toronto's second consecutive first-round series against the third-seeded Boston Bruins in the 2019 playoffs, Kadri was suspended for the remainder of the first round for cross-checking Bruins' forward Jake DeBrusk in game 2. The Maple Leafs lost the series in seven games, surrendering a 3–2 series lead in the process.

==== Colorado Avalanche (2019–2022) ====
On July 1, 2019, Kadri along with Calle Rosén and a 2020 third-round pick was traded to the Colorado Avalanche in exchange for Tyson Barrie, Alexander Kerfoot and a sixth-round pick in 2020. He found success with his new team, serving as their second-line centre, recording 19 goals and 17 assists in his first 51 games, before missing the rest of the 2019–20 season due to a lower-body injury. The regular season was itself prematurely ended by three weeks due to the COVID-19 pandemic restrictions, with the 2020 playoffs held later in the summer in a bubble in Edmonton, Canada at Rogers Place. Kadri rejoined the team for the playoffs and played a major role in the team's victories in the qualifying round and the first round. Colorado eventually lost to the Dallas Stars in the second round in seven games.

With the pandemic still ongoing, the NHL revised its format for a shortened 2020–21 season, with teams exclusively playing within their divisions. Kadri had 11 goals and 21 assists in all 56 games played, while the Avalanche enjoyed an excellent season and won the Presidents' Trophy as the best team in the league, narrowly prevailing over rivals the Vegas Golden Knights. Entering the 2021 playoffs as one of the favourites, the Avalanche swept the St. Louis Blues in the first round. However, Kadri was suspended for eight games after an illegal hit to the head of Blues defenceman Justin Faulk in game two of the first-round playoff series. Kadri appealed the suspension, which was upheld by the league. Kadri would not return to the 2021 playoffs as the last game of his suspension coincided with Colorado's elimination in the second round in six games by the Vegas Golden Knights. He later reflected on the situation, saying "I hate letting people down, I do. And when I looked up from the ice and saw Justin lying there…I knew what was coming. I knew. When I was sitting in the penalty box, my mind was just spinning. I was frustrated with myself."

For the 2021–22 season, the NHL returned to its normal competition structure. It would be Kadri's best season to date, as he scored 28 goals and recorded 59 assists, setting new bests in assists and total points. For the first time in his career, he scored over a point per game. Before sustaining an upper-body injury in March, Kadri had been on pace to hit the 100-point threshold for the first time in his career. He missed eight games but returned for the final games of the regular season and the Avalanche finished the season as a team as the top seed in the West and the Presidents’ Trophy runner-up to the Florida Panthers. Kadri again found himself at the centre of controversy when, in game 3 of the Avalanche's 2022 playoff second-round series against the Blues, he collided with Blues goaltender Jordan Binnington while charging the net front. As a result, Binnington was forced to exit the game with a lower-body injury and sit out the remainder of the series. The Avalanche, behind at the time, won the game. Blues head coach Craig Berube, when asked about the incident, said only "Look at Kadri's reputation. That's all I've got to say." Kadri denied that he had intended to injure Binnington, while Avalanche head coach Jared Bednar insisted it was an accident resulting from a collision between Kadri and Blues defenceman Calle Rosén. Binnington was alleged by Kadri to have hurled a water bottle at him during an on-camera interview after the game. In game 4, he scored his first career playoff hat-trick, leading the Avalanche to a 3–1 edge in the series. Blues forward David Perron was later fined for cross-checking Kadri during the game. The Avalanche won the series, advancing to the conference finals for the first time in 20 years. In game 3 of the conference finals against the Edmonton Oilers, Kadri was injured after being cross-checked into the boards by Oilers forward Evander Kane, and Bednar announced that he would miss the rest of the series "if not longer." Kadri underwent thumb surgery. Defying initial expectations, Kadri returned to play in game 4 of the Avalanche's 2022 Stanley Cup Final series against the two-time defending Stanley Cup champions, the Tampa Bay Lightning, scoring the game-winning overtime goal. The Avalanche would go on to win series in six games to clinch the Cup. Kadri's status as the first Muslim player to win, as well as the sport's most famous Muslim player, attracted attention afterward.

As a result of his strong play throughout the final season of his contract, there was considerable discussion around Kadri's next contract, with many speculating that he would be too expensive for the Avalanche to re-sign under the salary cap. Kadri, for his part, said that he desired to return to Colorado, but added "I've shown what my worth is and I'm just looking forward to watching this all develop."

==== Calgary Flames (2022–2026) ====
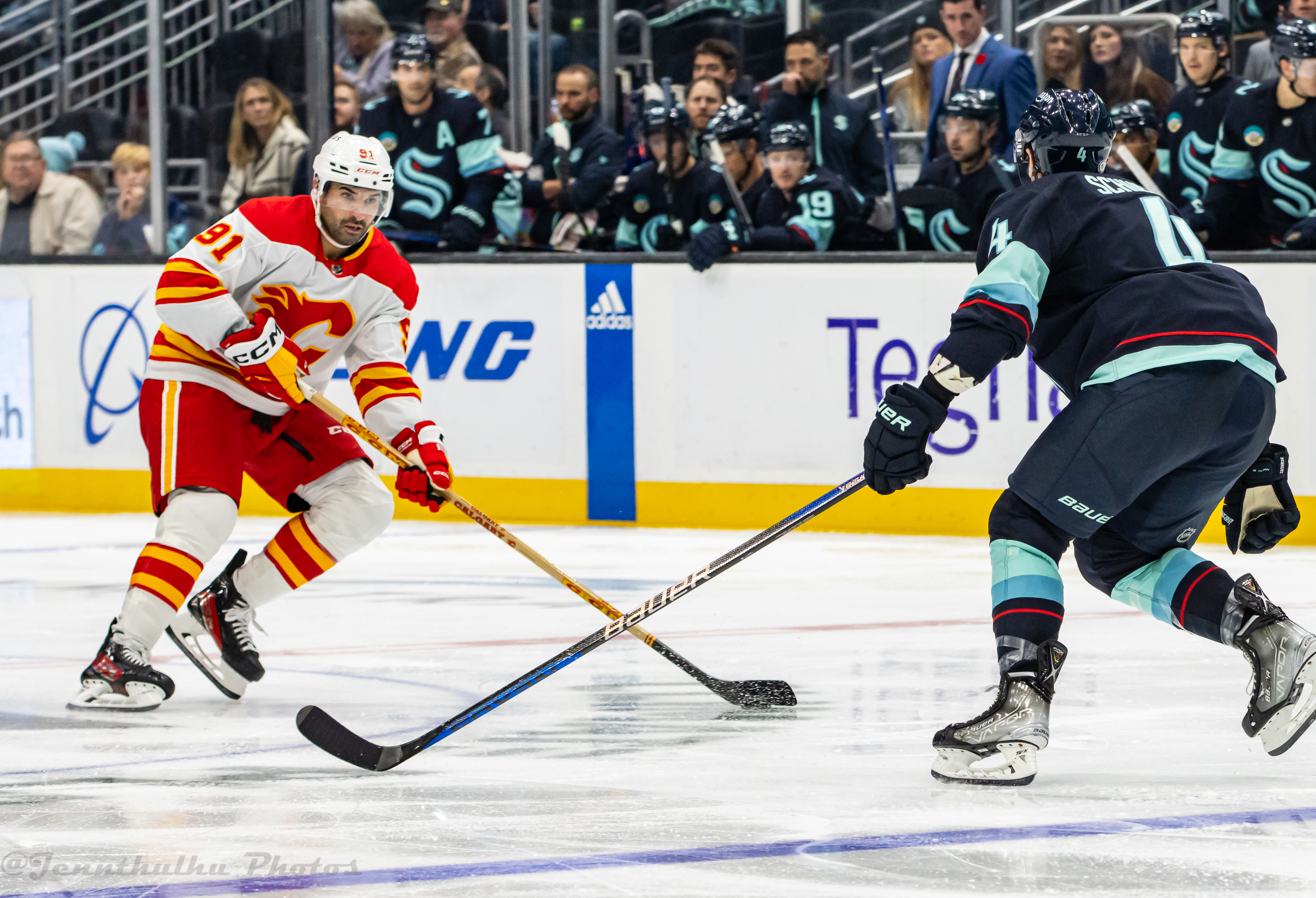
Kadri as a member of the Calgary Flames with Justin Schultz of the Seattle Kraken in November 2023.

On August 18, 2022, Kadri signed as a free agent to a seven-year, $49 million contract with the Calgary Flames. On November 5, 2025, Kadri played his 1,000th NHL game, becoming the 411th player to reach the mark.

==== Return to Colorado (2026–present) ====
On March 6, 2026, Kadri was traded back to Colorado, alongside a 2027 fourth-round pick, in exchange for Max Curran, Victor Olofsson, a conditional 2027 second-round pick, and a conditional 2028 first-round pick.

== International play ==
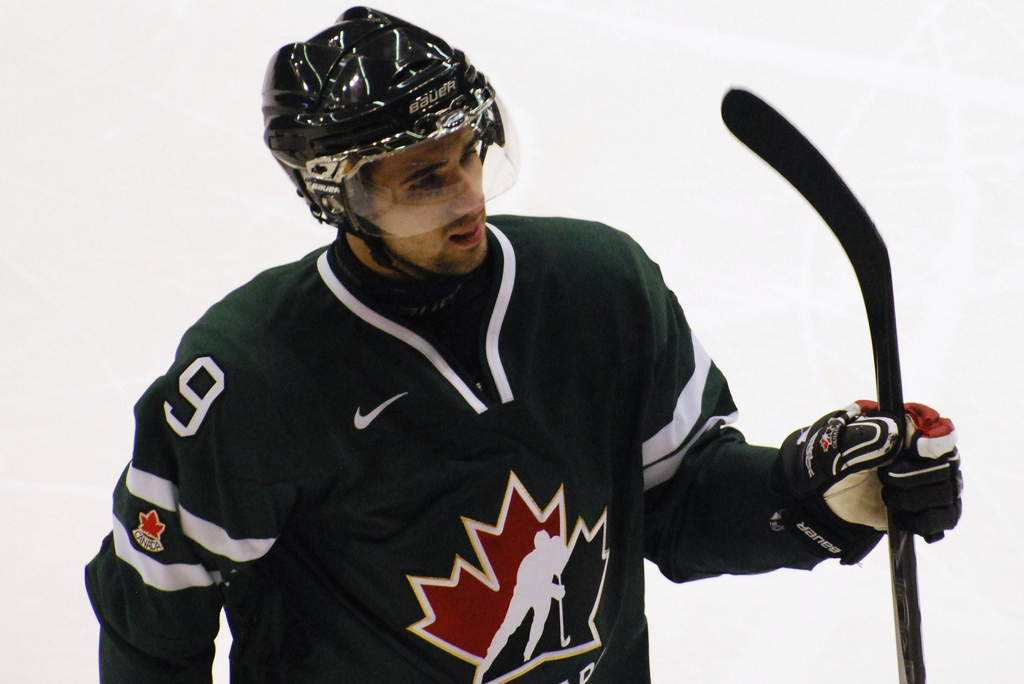
- Kadri with Canada junior team in 2010

Medal record

Men's ice hockey

Representing Canada

World Junior Championships
Silver medal – second place	2010 Saskatoon	

Kadri played for Team Ontario at the 2007 Canada Winter Games, where they won a gold medal. He first represented Canada at the 2007 Ivan Hlinka Memorial Tournament, where the team finished fourth. Kadri was invited to Canada's selection camp for the 2010 World Junior Championships held in Saskatoon and Regina, Saskatchewan. After being cut in 2009, Kadri was selected to represent Canada in 2010. In Canada's preliminary round game against the United States, Kadri was one of the players selected for the shootout, scoring on goaltender Jack Campbell to help Canada secure the victory.

During the tournament, Kadri recorded three goals and five assists. During the tournament, Kadri attracted attention for his refusal to shake hands with Switzerland's Nino Niederreiter after their semifinal game. Kadri did not elaborate on the specifics of what caused his refusal, but did absolve Niederreiter of using an ethnic slur: "Obviously, in big games like that, guys tend to lose their composure a bit, but I didn't take offence to anything he said. It was just that I felt like I didn't have to shake his hand." Kadri later had second thoughts about his refusal, stating, "I regret it a little bit." During the gold medal game against the United States, Kadri had two assists including one on Jordan Eberle's game-tying goal with 1:35 left in the third period. However, Canada lost the game in overtime, leaving Kadri and his teammates with the silver medal.

== Personal life ==
Kadri is named after his grandfather. He is also Muslim. Kadri was the first Muslim drafted by the Maple Leafs, and the highest-drafted Muslim in NHL history until being surpassed by Nail Yakupov in 2012. In high school, Kadri served as a member of his school's Muslim Student Association. Kadri is the fourth player of Lebanese descent to play in the NHL, following John Hanna, Alain Nasreddine and Ed Hatoum.

In July 2018, Kadri married his fiancée Ashley Cave at Casa Loma in Toronto. They had their first child together, a daughter named Naylah, in July 2019.

In June 2020, Kadri became an inaugural executive board member of the Hockey Diversity Alliance, whose goal is to address intolerance and racism in hockey.

Kadri was awarded the Key to the City of London, Ontario, on August 27, 2022, by Mayor of London Ed Holder.

In the wake of the Gaza war, Kadri announced his support for Palestine and called for a ceasefire on social media.

In 2024, Kadri published a memoir, Dreamer: My Life On the Edge, published by Viking Press.

== Career statistics ==
=== Regular season and playoffs ===
			Regular season					Playoffs
Season	Team	League	GP	G	A	Pts	PIM	GP	G	A	Pts	PIM
2005–06	London Jr. Knights AAA	AH U16	62	49	43	92	82	—	—	—	—	—
2006–07	Kitchener Rangers	OHL	62	7	15	22	30	9	0	2	2	4
2007–08	Kitchener Rangers	OHL	68	25	40	65	57	20	9	17	26	26
2008–09	London Knights	OHL	56	25	53	78	31	14	9	12	21	22
2009–10	London Knights	OHL	56	35	58	93	105	12	9	18	27	26
2009–10	Toronto Maple Leafs	NHL	1	0	0	0	0	—	—	—	—	—
2010–11	Toronto Marlies	AHL	44	17	24	41	62	—	—	—	—	—
2010–11	Toronto Maple Leafs	NHL	29	3	9	12	8	—	—	—	—	—
2011–12	Toronto Maple Leafs	NHL	21	5	2	7	8	—	—	—	—	—
2011–12	Toronto Marlies	AHL	48	18	22	40	39	11	3	7	10	6
2012–13	Toronto Marlies	AHL	27	8	18	26	26	—	—	—	—	—
2012–13	Toronto Maple Leafs	NHL	48	18	26	44	23	7	1	3	4	10
2013–14	Toronto Maple Leafs	NHL	78	20	30	50	67	—	—	—	—	—
2014–15	Toronto Maple Leafs	NHL	73	18	21	39	28	—	—	—	—	—
2015–16	Toronto Maple Leafs	NHL	76	17	28	45	73	—	—	—	—	—
2016–17	Toronto Maple Leafs	NHL	82	32	29	61	95	6	1	1	2	8
2017–18	Toronto Maple Leafs	NHL	80	32	23	55	42	4	0	2	2	19
2018–19	Toronto Maple Leafs	NHL	73	16	28	44	43	2	1	1	2	19
2019–20	Colorado Avalanche	NHL	51	19	17	36	97	15	9	9	18	10
2020–21	Colorado Avalanche	NHL	56	11	21	32	34	2	0	1	1	10
2021–22	Colorado Avalanche	NHL	71	28	59	87	71	16	7	8	15	8
2022–23	Calgary Flames	NHL	82	24	32	56	56	—	—	—	—	—
2023–24	Calgary Flames	NHL	82	29	46	75	43	—	—	—	—	—
2024–25	Calgary Flames	NHL	82	35	32	67	72	—	—	—	—	—
2025–26	Calgary Flames	NHL	61	12	29	41	24	—	—	—	—	—
2025–26	Colorado Avalanche	NHL	16	4	5	9	6	13	3	6	9	4
NHL totals			1,062	323	437	760	790	65	22	31	53	88

=== International ===
Year	Team	Event	Result	GP	G	A	Pts	PIM
2008	Canada	IH18	1st place, gold medalist(s)	4	0	4	4	6
2010	Canada	WJC	2nd place, silver medalist(s)	6	3	5	8	14
2014	Canada	WC	5th	8	0	3	3	4
Junior totals				10	3	9	12	20
Senior totals				8	0	3	3	4

== Awards and honours ==
Award	Year	Ref
OHL
CHL Top Prospects Game	2009	
All-Star Game	2010	
Second All-Star Team	2010	
NHL
NHL All-Star Game	2022, 2023	
Stanley Cup champion	2022	

Awards and achievements
Preceded by Luke Schenn	Toronto Maple Leafs first-round draft pick 2009	Succeeded by Tyler Biggs
