= 1922–23 Swiss National Ice Hockey Championship =

The 1922–23 Swiss National Ice Hockey Championship was the 13th edition of the national ice hockey championship in Switzerland. EHC St. Moritz won the championship by defeating HC Rosey Gstaad in the final.

== First round ==
=== Eastern Series ===
EHC St. Moritz qualified for the final.

=== Western Series ===
==== Semifinals ====
- HC La Chaux-de-Fonds - HC Château-d'Oex 0:8
- Lausanne HC - HC Rosey Gstaad 1:22

==== Final ====
- HC Rosey Gstaad - HC Château-d'Oex 4:1

== Final ==
- EHC St. Moritz - HC Rosey Gstaad 3:0
