= 1932–33 Swiss National Ice Hockey Championship =

The 1932–33 Swiss National Ice Hockey Championship was the 23rd edition of the national ice hockey championship in Switzerland. HC Davos won the championship by finishing first in the final round.

== First round ==
=== Eastern Series ===
HC Davos qualified for the final round.

=== Central Series ===
Zürcher SC qualified for the final round.

=== Western Series ===
HC Chateaux d'Oex qualified for the final round as the only team in the Western Series.

== Final round ==
Pl.	Team	GP	W	T	L	Pts
1.	HC Davos	2	2	0	0	4
2.	Zürcher SC	2	1	0	1	2
3.	HC Chateaux d'Oex	2	0	0	2	0
