= 1909–10 Swiss National Ice Hockey Championship =

The 1909–10 Swiss National Ice Hockey Championship was the second edition of the national ice hockey championship in Switzerland. Seven teams participated in the championship, which was won by HC La Villa, who finished first in the standings.

== Final standings ==
Pl.	Team
1.	HC La Villa
2.	HC Bellerive Vevey
3.	HC Les Avants
4.	HC Leysin
5.	Club des Patineurs Lausanne
6.	HC Rosey
7.	HC Les Diablerets
