= 1921–22 Swiss National Ice Hockey Championship =

The 1921–22 Swiss National Ice Hockey Championship was the 12th edition of the national ice hockey championship in Switzerland. EHC St. Moritz won the championship by defeating HC Rosey Gstaad in the final.

== First round ==
=== Eastern Series ===
Pl.	Team	GP	W	T	L	Pts
1.	EHC St. Moritz	2	2	0	0	4
2.	HC Davos	2	1	0	1	2
3.	Akademischer EHC Zürich	2	0	0	2	0

=== Western Series ===
==== First round ====
- Genève-Servette HC - HC La Chaux de Fonds 7:1
- HC Genève - Club des Patineurs Lausanne 7:5

==== Semifinals ====
- HC Château-d'Oex - Genève-Servette HC 8:0
- HC Rosey Gstaad - HC Genève 15:0

==== Final ====
- HC Château-d'Oex - HC Rosey Gstaad 3:1

== Final ==
- EHC St. Moritz - HC Rosey Gstaad 8:2
