= 1910–11 Swiss National Ice Hockey Championship =

The 1910–11 Swiss National Ice Hockey Championship was the third edition of the national ice hockey championship in Switzerland. Club des Patineurs Lausanne won the championship by defeating HC Bellerive Vevey in the final.

== Championship ==
=== Semifinal ===
- HC La Villa - Club des Patineurs Lausanne 2:3

=== Final ===
- HC Bellerive Vevey - Club des Patineurs Lausanne 4:6
