= 1930–31 Swiss National Ice Hockey Championship =

The 1930–31 Swiss National Ice Hockey Championship was the 21st edition of the national ice hockey championship in Switzerland. HC Davos won the championship by defeating Lycée Jaccard in the final.

== First round ==
=== Eastern Series ===
HC Davos qualified for the final.

=== Western Series ===
Lycée Jaccard qualified for the final.

== Final ==
- HC Davos - Lycée Jaccard 10:0
