= 1918–19 Swiss National Ice Hockey Championship =

The 1918–19 Swiss National Ice Hockey Championship was the ninth edition of the national ice hockey championship in Switzerland. HC Bellerive Vevey won the championship by defeating HC Bern in the final.

== First round ==
=== Eastern Series ===
HC Bern qualified for the final.

=== Western Series ===
==== Group 1 ====
Pl.	Team	GP	W	T	L	Pts
1.	HC Bellerive Vevey	2	2	0	0	4
2.	Club des Patineurs Lausanne	2	1	0	1	2
3.	HC Château-d'Oex	2	0	0	2	0

==== Group 2 ====
Pl.	Team	GP	W	T	L	Pts
1.	Genève-Servette HC	2	2	0	0	4
2.	HC Rosey Gstaad	2	1	0	1	2
3.	HC Caux	2	0	0	2	0

==== Western Final ====
- HC Bellerive Vevey - Genève-Servette HC 3:1

== Final ==
- HC Bellerive Vevey - HC Bern 2:0
