= 1929–30 Swiss National Ice Hockey Championship =

The 1929–30 Swiss National Ice Hockey Championship was the 20th edition of the national ice hockey championship in Switzerland. HC Davos won the championship by defeating Star Lausanne in the final.

== First round ==
=== Eastern Series ===
HC Davos qualified for the final as the only team in the Eastern Series.

=== Western Series ===
Pl.	Team	GP	W	T	L	Pts
1.	Star Lausanne	2	1	0	1	2
2.	HC Château d'Oex	2	1	0	1	2
3.	Lycée Jaccard	2	1	0	1	2

== Final ==
- HC Davos - Star Lausanne 16:1
