= 1908–09 Swiss National Ice Hockey Championship =

The 1908–09 Swiss National Ice Hockey Championship was the first edition of the national ice hockey championship in Switzerland. Eight teams participated in the championship, which was won by HC Bellerive Vevey, who finished first in the standings.

== Final standings ==
Pl.	Team	GP	W	T	L	Pts
1.	HC Bellerive Vevey	7	7	0	0	14
2.	HC La Villa	7	5	2	0	10
3.	Club des Patineurs Lausanne	5	3	1	1	7
4.	HC Les Avants	7	2	1	4	5
5.	Genève-Servette HC	5	2	0	3	4
6.	Caux HC	3	1	0	2	2
7.	SC Leysin	3	0	1	2	1
8.	SC Villars	5	0	0	5	0
