= 1919–20 Swiss International Ice Hockey Championship =

The 1919–20 Swiss International Ice Hockey Championship was the fifth edition of the international ice hockey championship in Switzerland. HC Rosey Gstaad, won the championship by defeating HC Servette in the final.

== Championship ==
=== First round ===
- HC Château-d'Oex - HC Bellerive Vevey II 5:0
- HC Servette II - HC Bern 2:0

=== Quarterfinals ===
- HC Rosey Gstaad - HC Caux 11:0
- HC Bellerive Vevey - HC Château-d'Oex 4:1
- HC Servette - HC La Villa 6:3
- HC Nautique-Genève - HC Servette II 1:0

=== Semifinals ===
- HC Rosey Gstaad - HC Bellerive Vevey 4:0
- HC Servette - HC Nautique-Genève 7:2

=== Final ===
- HC Rosey Gstaad - HC Servette 3:2
