= 1917–18 Swiss National Ice Hockey Championship =

The 1917–18 Swiss National Ice Hockey Championship was the eighth edition of the national ice hockey championship in Switzerland. HC Bern won the championship by defeating HC Rosey Gstaad in the final.

== First round ==
=== Eastern Series ===
HC Bern qualified for the final.

=== Western Series ===
Pl.	Team
1.	HC Rosey Gstaad
2.	HC Bellerive Vevey
3.	Genève-Servette HC
4.	HC Genève

== Final ==
- HC Bern - HC Rosey Gstaad 1:0
