= Aleksandr Tarasov (footballer, born 1972) =

Russian footballer

Personal information
- Full name: Aleksandr Anatolyevich Tarasov
- Date of birth: 7 March 1972 (age 54)
- Height: 1.78 m (5 ft 10 in)
- Positions: Defender; forward; midfielder

Senior career*
Years	Team	Apps	(Gls)
1989	FC Torpedo Moscow	0	(0)
1989	FC Chayka-CSKA-2 Moscow	5	(0)
1990–1991	FC Zvezda Moscow	58	(0)
1992–1994	FC Torpedo Moscow	1	(0)
1992–1993	→ FC Torpedo-d Moscow (loans)	59	(10)
1993–1994	→ Torentul Chișinău (loan)	10	(1)
1997–1998	FC Monolit Moscow	65	(17)
2000–2002	FC Uralan Plus Moscow	80	(2)
2003–2004	FC Spartak Lukhovitsy	23	(0)
2004	FC Obninsk	3	(0)
- * Club domestic league appearances and goals

Aleksandr Anatolyevich Tarasov (Russian: Александр Анатольевич Тарасов; born 7 March 1972) is a former Russian football player.

Tarasov was a product of FC Torpedo Moscow's youth academy, and made 5 appearances for the club in the 1989 USSR Federation Cup, including the 0–2 quarter-final defeat to FC Dnepr Dnepropetrovsk. He also made a single appearance for Torpedo in the 1992 Russian Top League, playing in the final round match.
