= František Gerhát =

Slovak ice hockey player

- Born: April 28, 1990 (age 34); Bratislava, Czechoslovakia
- Height: 5 ft 10 in (178 cm)
- Weight: 198 lb (90 kg; 14 st 2 lb)
- Position: Forward
- Shoots: Left
- Czech team Former teams: HC Verva Litvínov; HC Slovan Bratislava; HC Stadion Litoměřice; HC Most
- Playing career: 2009–present

František Gerhát (born April 28, 1990) is a Slovak professional ice hockey player currently playing for HC Verva Litvínov in the Czech Extraliga.

Gerhat began his career with HC Slovan Bratislava, playing in their U18 and U20 teams before moving to Litvínov in 2008. He made his Czech Extraliga debut for the team during the 2009-10 Czech Extraliga season.

== Career statistics ==
=== Regular season and playoffs ===
			Regular season					Playoffs
Season	Team	League	GP	G	A	Pts	PIM	GP	G	A	Pts	PIM

=== International ===
Year	Team	Event	Result	GP	G	A	Pts	PIM
