= 2011–12 National League B season =

- League: National League B
- Sport: Ice hockey
- Duration: September 9, 2011 – February 7, 2012
- Games: 45
- Teams: 10

Regular Season
- Season Champions: Lausanne HC
- Top scorer: Jeff Campbell (SC Langenthal)

Playoffs
- Semi-Final champions: Lausanne HC
- Semi-Final runners-up: EHC Visp
- Semi-Final champions: SC Langenthal
- Semi-Final runners-up: Chx-de-Fds

Swiss champion NLB
- Champions: SC Langenthal
- Runners-up: Lausanne HC

National League B seasons
- 2010–11 2012–13

The 2011–12 National League B season was played from September 9, 2011, to February 7, 2012. The regular season was won by Lausanne HC with 105 points, 15 points ahead of the second place team, SC Langenthal. The playoffs were played from February 12 to March 27, 2012, with SC Langenthal defeating Lausanee HC to become Swiss Champions of NLB. Langenthal would later play HC Ambrì-Piotta in the league qualification series. Since Ambrì-Piotta would defeat Langenthal in the series, there was no changes to the NLA or NLB teams for the 2012–2013 seasons.

== Regular season ==
The National League B regular season consists of 45 games, 2 double rounds playing each team twice, and a single round playing each team once.

=== Standings ===
	Team	GP	W	L	OTW	OTL	GF	GA	Pts
1.	Lausanne HC	45	31	9	4	1	186	115	102
2.	SC Langenthal	45	27	13	1	4	157	110	87
3.	HC La Chaux-de-Fonds	45	24	14	3	4	155	127	82
4.	EHC Visp	45	22	17	4	2	170	150	76
5.	EHC Basel Sharks	45	17	19	3	6	132	142	63
6.	GCK Lions	45	19	22	2	2	122	134	63
7.	EHC Olten	45	16	20	6	3	152	146	63
8.	HC Ajoie	45	16	24	3	2	119	154	56
9.	HC Thurgau	45	11	27	3	4	118	170	43
10.	HC Sierre-Anniviers	45	9	27	4	5	114	177	40

=== Attendance ===
Team	Games	Total Attendance	Average
Lausanne HC	23	110,354	4,798
EHC Visp	22	68,860	3,130
EHC Olten	23	69,506	3,022
Chx-de-Fds	23	57,201	2,487
SC Langenthal	23	43,539	1,893
HC Sierre	22	37,092	1,686
HC Ajoie	22	35,992	1,636
EHC Basel Sharks	23	29,003	1,261
HC Thurgau	22	20,614	937
GCK Lions	22	5,830	265
LEAGUE TOTAL	225	477,991	2,124

=== League Leaders ===
==== Scoring ====
Name	Team	GP	G	A	P
(Canada) Jeff Campbell	SC Langenthal	45	30	38	68
(Canada) Brent Kelly	SC Langenthal	45	27	41	68
(Canada) Marco Charpentier	Chx-de-Fds	45	27	33	60
(Austria) Oliver Setzinger	Lausanne HC	45	26	32	58
(Switzerland) Stefan Tschannen	SC Langenthal	42	23	32	55
(Switzerland) Luca Triulzi	EHC Visp	44	20	31	51
(Switzerland) Alain Brunold	EHC Visp	45	20	30	50
(Canada) Dominic Forget	EHC Visp	44	20	30	50
(Czech Republic) Tomas Dolana	EHC Visp	45	18	32	50
(Canada) Derek Cormier	HC Sierre	41	13	37	40

== Playoffs ==
During the first round of the playoffs, National League regulations state that the top seeded team my play any team of its choice from the bottom 4 seeds. The next seeded team may then choose their opponent from the remaining 3 of the bottom 4 seeds and so on. The same rule applies for the Semi-Finals. During the playoffs, teams alternate venues game to game, with the highest seed playing home first.

=== Tournament Bracket ===
Quarter-Finals
1	Lausanne HC	4
6	GCK Lions	1
2	SC Langenthal	4
5	EHC Basel Sharks	0
(Pairings are reseeded after the first round)
3	Chx-de-Fds	4
8	HC Ajoie	3
4	EHC Visp	4
5	EHC Olten	1

Semi-Finals
1	Lausanne HC	4
4	EHC Visp	0
2	Langenthal	4
3	Chx-de-Fds	3

Finals
5	Lausanne HC	2
7	Langenthal	4

== League Qualification ==
The champions of the National League B has the opportunity to play the losing team of a Play-Out tournament from the National League A to take their spot in the league. SC Langenthal took on HC Ambrì-Piotta in a 7-game series, losing 4-1 and remaining in the National League B.

=== HC Ambrì-Piotta vs. SC Langenthal ===
April 3	HC Ambrì-Piotta	3-1	SC Langenthal	Stadion Valascia	Recap
Paolo Duca - 07:22; Inti Pestoni - 22:22 Julian Walker - 59:55		Scoring stats	46:22 - Marc Leuenberger
Thomas Bäumle		Goalie stats	Marc Eichmann (Save % - 87.5)

April 5	SC Langenthal	0-3	HC Ambrì-Piotta	Kunsteisbahn Schoren	Recap
No Scoring		Scoring stats	10:39 - Elias Bianchi; 25:48 - Vitaly Lakhmatov; 59:14 - Vitaly Lakhmatov
Marc Eichmann		Goalie stats	Thomas Bäumle (Save % - 100.00)

April 7	HC Ambrì-Piotta	1-3	SC Langenthal	Stadion Valascia	Recap
Roman Schlagenhauf - 31:02		Scoring stats	34:42 - Marco Gruber; 57:56 - Tim Weber; 59:52 - Stefan Tschannen
Thomas Bäumle		Goalie stats	Marc Eichmann (Save % - 96.67)

April 9	SC Langenthal	1-3	HC Ambrì-Piotta	Kunsteisbahn Schoren	Recap
Inti Pestoni - 19:44; Alain Demuth - 45:08; Elias Bianchi - 57:38		Scoring stats	14:07 - Tim Weber
Marc Eichmann		Goalie stats	Thomas Bäumle

April 12	HC Ambrì-Piotta	3-0	SC Langenthal	Stadion Valascia	Recap
Gregory Hofmann - 27:21; Marco Pedretti - 41:30; Inti Pestoni - 48:38		Scoring stats	No Scoring
Thomas Bäumle		Goalie stats	Marc Eichmann (Save % - 84.21)

HC Ambrì-Piotta win series 4-1
