= 1917–18 Swiss International Ice Hockey Championship =

The 1917–18 Swiss International Ice Hockey Championship was the third edition of the international ice hockey championship in Switzerland. HC Bellerive Vevey won the championship by defeating HC Rosey Gstaad in the final.

== Final ==
- HC Bellerive Vevey - HC Rosey Gstaad 2:1
