= 2009–10 National League B season =

2009–10 National League B
- League: National League B
- Sport: Ice hockey
- Number of games: 45
- Number of teams: 10

Regular season
- Season champions: EHC Visp
- Runners-up: EHC Olten
- Top scorer: Dominic Forget

Playoffs
- Finals champions: Lausanne HC
- Runners-up: EHC Visp

Seasons
- ← 2008–09 2010–11 →

The 2009–10 National League B season was the 63rd season played in the National League B, Switzerland's second-tier professional ice hockey league. The season started with 11 teams, but the Young-Sprinters had to withdraw after 15 games due to financial difficulties. In Round 38, Dominic Forget made a historic moment when he scored five seconds after the game started, a new league record. EHC Visp won the regular season championship with a one-point edge over second-place EHC Olten. The winner of the playoffs was Lausanne HC, the third-ranked team of the regular season.

== Regular season ==
#	Team	GP	W	L	OTW	OTL	GF	GA	Pts
1.	EHC Visp	45	27	10	6	2	224	140	95
2.	EHC Olten	45	30	12	1	2	187	129	94
3.	Lausanne HC	45	28	12	2	3	166	121	91
4.	HC Sierre-Anniviers	45	21	12	5	7	161	132	80
5.	HC Ajoie	45	21	17	5	2	157	149	75
6.	HC La Chaux-de-Fonds	45	20	19	2	4	177	166	68
7.	SC Langenthal	45	16	26	3	0	124	156	54
8.	EHC Basel Sharks	45	12	28	1	4	111	180	42
9.	HC Thurgau	45	12	28	1	4	131	189	42
10.	GC Küsnacht Lions	45	10	33	2	0	123	199	34
10.	Young Sprinters HC	-	-	-	-	-	-	-	-

== Playoffs ==
Since 2007, the four top-ranked clubs have been allowed to choose an opponent from places 5-8 in the table for the quarter-finals. The play-offs were played in a best-of-seven format.

Quarter-Finals
1	EHC Visp	4
8	EHC Basel Sharks	0
2	EHC Olten	4
7	SC Langenthal	3
(Pairings are reseeded after the first round)
3	Lausanne HC	4
6	HC Ajoie	3
4	HC Sierre-Anniviers	4
5	HC La Chaux-de-Fonds	1

Semi-Finals
1	EHC Visp	4
4	HC Sierre-Anniviers	2
2	EHC Olten	1
3	Lausanne HC	4

Finals
1	EHC Visp	1
3	Lausanne HC	4
