= Alexander Tarasov (ice hockey) =

Russian ice hockey player

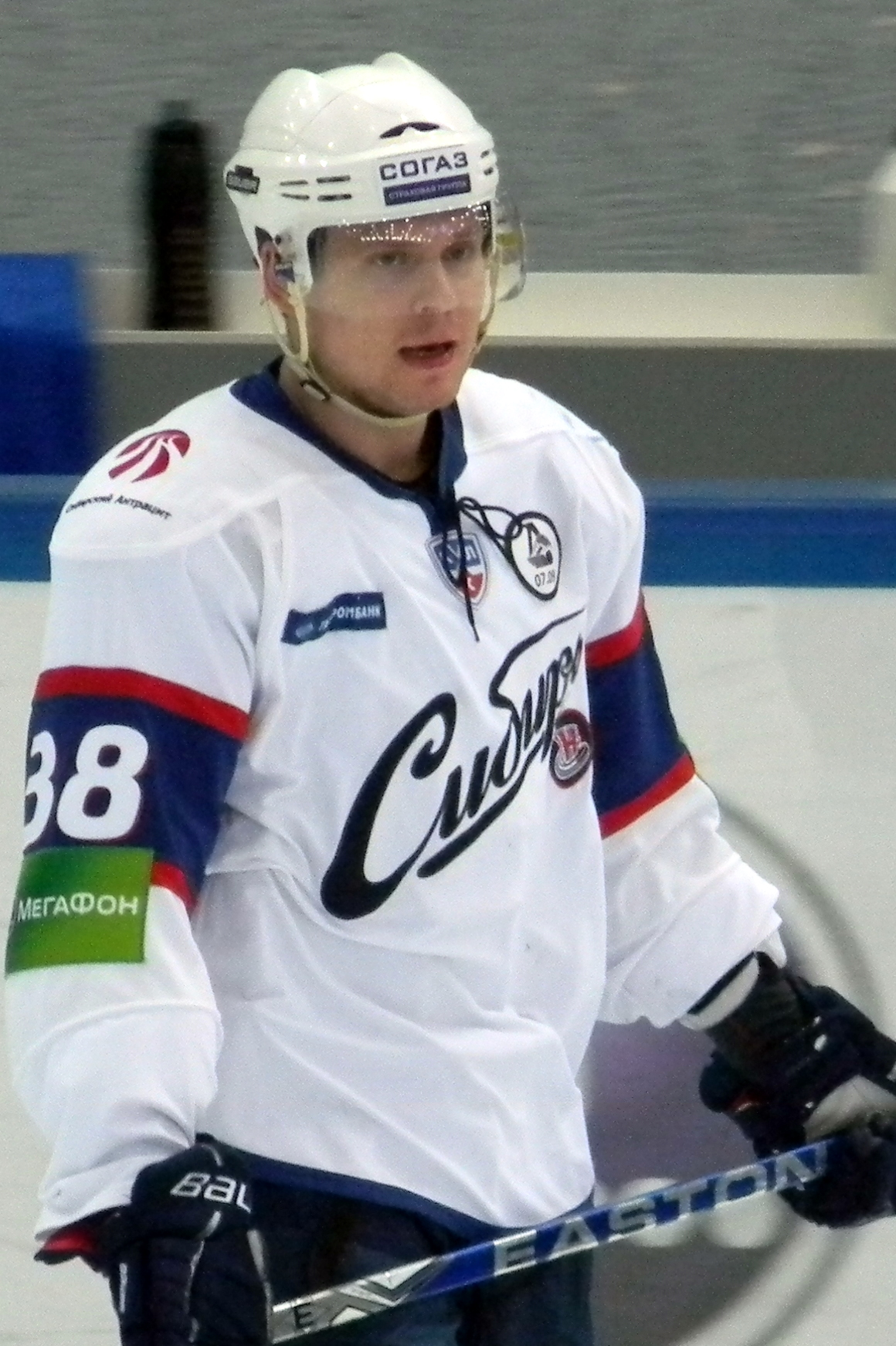
- Born: 24 December 1990 Magnitogorsk, Russian SFSR, Soviet Union
- Height: 6 ft 0 in (183 cm)
- Weight: 201 lb (91 kg; 14 st 5 lb)
- Position: Defence
- Shoots: Left
- KHL team: UHC Dynamo
- NHL draft: Undrafted
- Playing career: 2009–present

Alexander Tarasov (born 24 December 1990) is a Russian professional ice hockey defenceman. He played with UHC Dynamo in the Kontinental Hockey League during the 2010–11 KHL season.
