= 2010–11 National League B season =

- League: National League B
- Sport: Ice hockey
- Number of games: 45
- Number of teams: 10

Regular season
- Season champions: HC La Chaux-de-Fonds
- Runners-up: EHC Olten

Playoffs
- Finals champions: EHC Visp
- Runners-up: Lausanne HC

Seasons
- ← 2009-10 2011-12 →

The 2010–11 National League B season was the 64. season played in the National League B, Switzerland's second-tier professional ice hockey league, during 2010 and 2011. HC La Chaux-de-Fonds won the regular season championship, with a nine-point edge over second place EHC Olten. The winner of the playoffs was EHC Visp, who won in the finals against Lausanne HC.

== Regular season ==
#	Team	GP	W	L	OTW	OTL	GF	GA	Pts
1.	HC La Chaux-de-Fonds	45	24	10	7	4	175	139	90
2.	EHC Olten	45	22	14	6	3	192	147	81
3.	Lausanne HC	45	22	13	5	5	159	122	81
4.	SC Langenthal	45	19	16	7	3	173	157	74
5.	EHC Basel Sharks	45	20	16	2	7	138	136	71
6.	EHC Visp	45	18	17	7	3	153	152	71
7.	HC Ajoie	45	19	17	4	5	141	149	70
8.	HC Sierre-Anniviers	45	16	24	2	3	149	166	55
9.	GC Küsnacht Lions	45	14	25	2	4	133	180	50
10.	HC Thurgau	45	8	30	1	6	133	198	32

== Playoffs ==
Since 2007, the four top-ranked clubs have been allowed to choose an opponent from places 5-8 in the table for the quarter-finals. The play-offs were played in a best-of-seven format.

Quarter-Finals
1	HC La Chaux-de-Fonds	4
8	HC Sierre-Anniviers	0
2	EHC Olten	4
5	EHC Basel Sharks	0
(Pairings are reseeded after the first round)
3	Lausanne HC	4
7	HC Ajoie	3
4	SC Langenthal	2
6	EHC Visp	4

Semi-Finals
1	HC La Chaux-de-Fonds	3
6	EHC Visp	4
2	EHC Olten	2
3	Lausanne HC	4

Finals
3	Lausanne HC	0
6	EHC Visp	4
