= HC Villars =

- City: Villars-sur-Ollon, Switzerland
- League: Swiss 1. Liga
- Founded: 1908
- Home arena: Centre des Sports de Villars
- Colours: Yellow, Blue
- General manager: Phillipe Bonzon
- Head coach: Adrien Plavsic
- Website: villarshc.ch

HC Villars is an ice hockey team in Villars-sur-Ollon, Switzerland. They play in the Swiss 1. Liga.

The club was founded in 1908 as one of the founders of the Nationalliga A. They played in the Nationalliga A in the 1960s. Villars won the league title in 1963 and 1964.

== Achievements ==
- NLA champion: (2) 1963, 1964
- NLB champion: (2) 1962, 1974
- Swiss 1. Liga champion (3) 1961, 1969, 1983
