= National League (ice hockey) =

Swiss top ice hockey league

- Current season, competition or edition: 2026–27 National League (ice hockey) season
- Formerly: NDA; 1938–1999; Nationalliga A 1999–2007; National League A 2007–2017; National League; 2017–present
- Sport: Ice hockey
- Founded: 1938; 88 years ago
- CEO: Denis Vaucher
- No. of teams: 14
- Country: Switzerland
- Most recent champion: HC Fribourg-Gottéron (2025–26)
- Most titles: HC Davos (31 titles)
- Broadcasters: MySports; SRG
- Relegation to: Swiss League
- International cup: Champions Hockey League
- Related competitions: Swiss League
- Website: National League

The National League (NL) is a professional ice hockey league in Switzerland and the highest level of the Swiss league system. Prior to the 2017–18 season, the league was known as National League A. During the 2022–23 season, the league had an average of 9,931 spectators per game which is the highest among European leagues (ahead of the KHL with 9,396 and the DEL with 7,781). The capital city's club SC Bern has been ranked first of all European clubs for 18 seasons and had an average attendance of 16,290 after the regular season. The ZSC Lions are another club in the top ten of European ice hockey attendance, ranking seventh with 9,694 spectators.

Teams from the NL participate in the IIHF's annual Champions Hockey League (CHL), competing for the European Trophy. Participation is based on the strength of the various leagues in Europe (excluding the European/Asian Kontinental Hockey League). Going into the 2022–23 CHL season, the NL was ranked the No. 2 league in Europe, allowing it to send its top five teams to compete in the CHL.

== Season structure ==
During the regular season, each of the 14 teams play 52 games. The top eight teams after the regular season qualify for the playoffs to determine the Swiss champion in best-of-seven series. The bottom four teams in the standings play a relegation tournament, called playouts, in which each team retains their regular season points and play an additional six matches. Following those matches, the two bottom ranked teams will play each other in a best-of-seven series, with the loser then playing the winner of the Swiss League playoffs in a best-of-seven series for a spot in the successive NL season.

== Current teams ==
Team	Location		Arena	Capacity	Founded	Joined league
Team	City	Canton	Arena	Capacity	Founded	Joined league
HC Ajoie	Porrentruy	Jura	Raiffeisen Arena	5,178	1973	2021
HC Ambrì-Piotta	Ambrì	Ticino	Gottardo Arena	6,775	1937	1985
SC Bern	Bern	Bern	PostFinance Arena	17,031	1931	1986
EHC Biel	Biel/Bienne	Bern	Tissot Arena	6,562	1939	2008
HC Davos	Davos	Grisons	zondacrypto Arena	6,547	1921	1993
Fribourg-Gottéron	Fribourg	Fribourg	BCF Arena	9,262	1938	1980
Genève-Servette HC	Geneva	Geneva	Patinoire des Vernets	7,135	1905	2001
EHC Kloten	Kloten	Zürich	SWISS Arena	7,600	1934	2022
Lausanne HC	Lausanne	Vaud	Vaudoise Aréna	9,600	1922	2013
HC Lugano	Lugano	Ticino	Cornèr Arena	7,800	1941	1981
SC Rapperswil-Jona Lakers	Rapperswil-Jona	St. Gallen	St. Galler Kantonalbank Arena	6,100	1945	2018
SCL Tigers	Langnau im Emmental	Bern	Emmental Versicherung Arena	6,000	1946	2015
ZSC Lions	Zürich	Zürich	Swiss Life Arena	12,000	1930	1989
EV Zug	Zug	Zug	OYM Hall	7,800	1967	1987

NL teams for the 2024–25 season

== Import players ==
The current gentlemen's agreement allows teams to dress a maximum of six non-Swiss players for each game. There is no official rule as it would be against Swiss laws to limit foreign workers in a given enterprise. This agreement is not directly related to Swiss citizenship as players with different nationalities but with Swiss player-licenses are considered Swiss players, thus they do not count as import players. Some current examples of this scenario are Josh Jooris with Genève-Servette HC and Floran Douay with HC Ambrì-Piotta. They all play with Swiss player-licenses as they have spent a good majority of their childhoods playing hockey with junior teams in Switzerland yet they do not possess Swiss citizenships. Such players would not be able to play in the NL if it was not for their Swiss player-licenses as they would not be considered good enough to use an import player spot on any team. Those spots are usually reserved for players who have had good NHL careers or players with great stats and performances in the AHL, SHL, KHL or Liiga.

The subject of import players has been and still is a huge subject of debates among team owners and GMs. Some of them wish to allow more import players per game in order to reduce the salaries of star Swiss players and the others want to keep that limit lower to allow more Swiss players to play on special units and have top roles on their teams.

== Media coverage ==
NL games are only available in Switzerland and MySports is the league's official broadcaster, airing all regular season and playoffs games. MySports pays CHF 35 million per year to broadcast NL games. Games are available with German, French and Italian commentaries.

Starting with the 2022/23 season, selected games are regularly broadcast on free-to-air local channels in all three linguistic regions.

The SRG SSR lost all broadcasting rights as of the 2024-25 season.

== Past champions ==
- 1938 – HC Davos
- 1939 – HC Davos
- 1940 – no winner
- 1941 – HC Davos
- 1942 – HC Davos
- 1943 – HC Davos
- 1944 – HC Davos
- 1945 – HC Davos
- 1946 – HC Davos
- 1947 – HC Davos
- 1948 – HC Davos
- 1949 – Zürcher SC
- 1950 – HC Davos
- 1951 – EHC Arosa
- 1952 – EHC Arosa
- 1953 – EHC Arosa
- 1954 – EHC Arosa
- 1955 – EHC Arosa
- 1956 – EHC Arosa
- 1957 – EHC Arosa
- 1958 – HC Davos
- 1959 – SC Bern
- 1960 – HC Davos
- 1961 – Zürcher SC
- 1962 – EHC Visp
- 1963 – HC Villars
- 1964 – HC Villars
- 1965 – SC Bern
- 1966 – Grasshopper-Club Zürich
- 1967 – EHC Kloten
- 1968 – HC La Chaux-de-Fonds
- 1969 – HC La Chaux-de-Fonds
- 1970 – HC La Chaux-de-Fonds
- 1971 – HC La Chaux-de-Fonds
- 1972 – HC La Chaux-de-Fonds
- 1973 – HC La Chaux-de-Fonds
- 1974 – SC Bern
- 1975 – SC Bern
- 1976 – SC Langnau
- 1977 – SC Bern
- 1978 – EHC Biel
- 1979 – SC Bern
- 1980 – EHC Arosa
- 1981 – EHC Biel
- 1982 – EHC Arosa
- 1983 – EHC Biel
- 1984 – HC Davos
- 1985 – HC Davos
- 1986 – HC Lugano
- 1987 – HC Lugano
- 1988 – HC Lugano
- 1989 – SC Bern
- 1990 – HC Lugano
- 1991 – SC Bern
- 1992 – SC Bern
- 1993 – EHC Kloten
- 1994 – EHC Kloten
- 1995 – EHC Kloten
- 1996 – EHC Kloten
- 1997 – SC Bern
- 1998 – EV Zug
- 1999 – HC Lugano
- 2000 – ZSC Lions
- 2001 – ZSC Lions
- 2002 – HC Davos
- 2003 – HC Lugano
- 2004 – SC Bern
- 2005 – HC Davos
- 2006 – HC Lugano
- 2007 – HC Davos
- 2008 – ZSC Lions
- 2009 – HC Davos
- 2010 – SC Bern
- 2011 – HC Davos
- 2012 – ZSC Lions
- 2013 – SC Bern
- 2014 – ZSC Lions
- 2015 – HC Davos
- 2016 – SC Bern
- 2017 – SC Bern
- 2018 – ZSC Lions
- 2019 – SC Bern
- 2020 – no winner
- 2021 – EV Zug
- 2022 – EV Zug
- 2023 – Genève-Servette HC
- 2024 – ZSC Lions
- 2025 – ZSC Lions
- 2026 – HC Fribourg-Gottéron

Swiss National Championship Serie A (1909–1937)

- 1909: HC Bellerive Vevey
- 1910: HC La Villa Lausanne
- 1911: Club des patineurs de Lausanne
- 1912: HC Les Avants
- 1913: HC Les Avants
- 1914: not played
- 1915: not played
- 1916: HC Bern
- 1917: HC Bern
- 1918: HC Bern
- 1919: HC Bellerive Vevey
- 1920: HC Bellerive Vevey
- 1921: HC Rosey-Gstaad
- 1922: EHC St. Moritz
- 1923: EHC St. Moritz
- 1924: HC Château-d'Œx
- 1925: HC Rosey-Gstaad
- 1926: HC Davos
- 1927: HC Davos
- 1928: EHC St. Moritz
- 1929: HC Davos
- 1930: HC Davos
- 1931: HC Davos
- 1932: HC Davos
- 1933: HC Davos
- 1934: HC Davos
- 1935: HC Davos
- 1936: Zürcher SC
- 1937: HC Davos

=== Titles by club ===
Club	Winners	Winning years
HC Davos	31	1926, 1927, 1929, 1930, 1931, 1932, 1933, 1934, 1935, 1937, 1938, 1939, 1941, 1942, 1943, 1944, 1945, 1946, 1947, 1948, 1950, 1958, 1960, 1984, 1985, 2002, 2005, 2007, 2009, 2011, 2015
SC Bern	16	1959, 1965, 1974, 1975, 1977, 1979, 1989, 1991, 1992, 1997, 2004, 2010, 2013, 2016, 2017, 2019
ZSC Lions	11	1936, 1949, 1961, 2000, 2001, 2008, 2012, 2014, 2018, 2024, 2025
EHC Arosa	9	1951, 1952, 1953, 1954, 1955, 1956, 1957, 1980, 1982
HC Lugano	7	1986, 1987, 1988, 1990, 1999, 2003, 2006
HC La Chaux-de-Fonds	6	1968, 1969, 1970, 1971, 1972, 1973
EHC Kloten	5	1967, 1993, 1994, 1995, 1996
HC Bellerive Vevey	3	1909, 1919, 1920
HC Bern	3	1916, 1917, 1918
EHC St. Moritz	3	1922, 1923, 1928
EHC Biel	3	1978, 1981, 1983
EV Zug	3	1998, 2021, 2022
HC Les Avants	2	1912, 1913
HC Rosey-Gstaad	2	1921, 1925
HC Villars	2	1963, 1964
HC La Villa Lausanne	1	1910
Club des patineurs de Lausanne	1	1911
HC Château-d'Œx	1	1924
EHC Visp	1	1962
Grasshopper-Club Zürich	1	1966
SC Langnau	1	1976
Genève-Servette HC	1	2023
HC Fribourg-Gottéron	1	2026

== See also ==
- Swiss League
- PostFinance Top Scorer
