= GCK Lions =

- City: Küsnacht, Switzerland
- League: Swiss League
- Founded: 1932
- Home arena: KEK Küsnacht (capacity 1,520)
- Colors
- General manager: Patrick Hager (CH)
- Head coach: Peter Andersson
- Asst. coach: Mark Bastl
- Captain: Yannick Blaser
- Affiliate: ZSC Lions
- Website: www.gcklions.ch

Franchise history
- 1932–2000: Grasshopper Club Zürich
- 2000–present: GCK Lions

The Grasshopper Club Küsnacht Lions are a Swiss professional ice hockey team founded in 1932. They are currently playing in the Swiss League (SL), Switzerland's second tier ice hockey division, as the affiliate to the ZSC Lions.

The home arena is KEK Küsnacht (capacity 2,800). The team has won one Swiss Championships, in 1966, as well as two championships in the Swiss second division (National League B), in 1946 and 1963. The name of GCK is derived from "Grasshopper Club Zürich" (GCZ) and "SC Küsnacht" (SCK) — two sports clubs which merged to form GCK.

== Honors ==
- National League Championship: (1) 1966
- NLB Championship: (2) 1946, 1963
- Swiss Cup: (1) 1966
