= EHC St. Moritz =

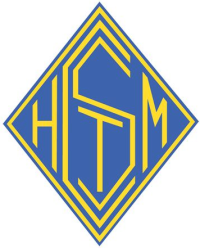
- City: St. Moritz, Switzerland
- League: 2. Liga
- Founded: 1918
- Home arena: Eisarena Ludains
- Colors: Blue and yellow
- Head coach: Paul Berri

EHC St. Moritz is a Swiss ice hockey team.

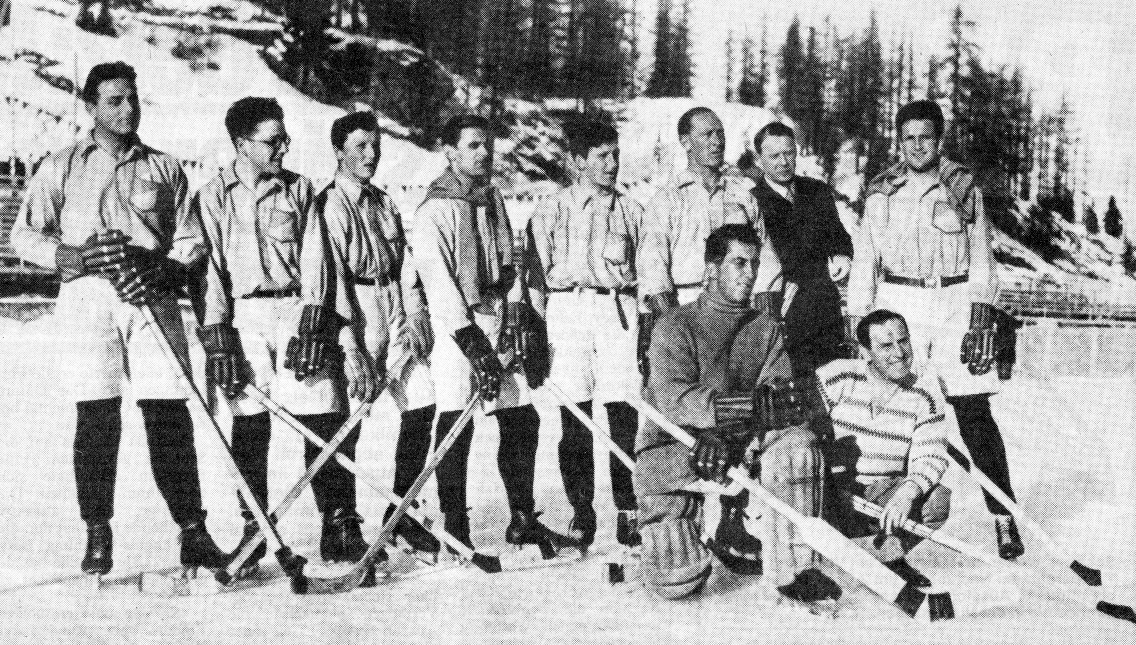
EHC St. Mortiz in 1928 (Bibi Torriani third from left)

Founded: 1918
Home arena: Eisarena Ludains (capacity 800)
Swiss Championships won: 3 (1922, 1923, 1928)
Nationalliga B Championships won: 1 (1954)
