= List of National League (ice hockey) seasons =

This is a list of Nationalliga A seasons since the inception of the league. National League A (NLA) is a professional ice hockey league in Switzerland.

== 1930s ==
- 1937–38
- 1938–39

== 1940s ==
- 1940–41
- 1941–42
- 1942–43
- 1943–44
- 1944–45
- 1945–46
- 1946–47
- 1947–48
- 1948–49
- 1949–50

== 1950s ==
- 1950–51
- 1951–52
- 1952–53
- 1953–54
- 1954–55
- 1955–56
- 1956–57
- 1957–58
- 1958–59
- 1959–60

== 1960s ==
- 1960–61
- 1961–62
- 1962–63
- 1963–64
- 1964–65
- 1965–66
- 1966–67
- 1967–68
- 1968–69
- 1969–70

== 1970s ==
- 1970–71
- 1971–72
- 1972–73
- 1973–74
- 1974–75
- 1975–76
- 1976–77
- 1977–78
- 1978–79
- 1979–80

== 1980s ==
- 1980–81
- 1981–82
- 1982–83
- 1983–84
- 1984–85
- 1985–86
- 1986–87
- 1987–88
- 1988–89
- 1989–90

== 1990s ==
- 1990–91
- 1991–92
- 1992–93
- 1993–94
- 1994–95
- 1995–96
- 1996–97
- 1997–98
- 1998–99
- 1999–00

== 2000s ==
- 2000–01
- 2001–02
- 2002–03
- 2003–04
- 2004–05
- 2005–06
- 2006–07
- 2007–08
- 2008–09
- 2009–10
- 2010–11
- 2011–12
- 2012–13
- 2013–14
- 2014–15
- 2015–16
- 2016–17
- 2017–18
- 2018–19
- 2019–20
- 2020–21
- 2021–22
- 2022–23
