= Jean Cusson =

Canadian ice hockey player

- Born: October 5, 1942 (age 82); Verdun, Quebec, Canada
- Height: 5 ft 10 in (178 cm)
- Weight: 170 lb (77 kg; 12 st 2 lb)
- Position: Left wing
- Shot: Left
- Played for: HC La Chaux-de-Fonds; SC Langnau; Genève-Servette; California/Oakland Seals
- National team: Canada
- Playing career: 1967–1979

Jean Cusson (born October 5, 1942) is a Canadian former professional ice hockey player who briefly played in the National Hockey League for the Oakland Seals. Cusson spent three years with the Canadian national team before the Seals signed him to a three-game amateur tryout contract in March, 1968. He only played two games for the Seals registering no points and a single shot on goal. He returned to Canada and played 2 seasons as a senior amateur, then moved to Switzerland and played out the remainder of his career in the National League A, serving as a player-coach until retiring in 1979 to focus on coaching, which he did until 1983. Cusson also excelled in other sports such as Canadian football and was drafted by the Montreal Alouettes in the 9th round of the 1964 CFL draft

== Career statistics ==
=== Regular season and playoffs ===
			Regular season					Playoffs
Season	Team	League	GP	G	A	Pts	PIM	GP	G	A	Pts	PIM
1964–65	Université de Montréal	OQAA	15	19	16	35	—	—	—	—	—	—
1965–66	Canadian National Team	Intl	—	—	—	—	—	—	—	—	—	—
1966–67	New Haven Blades	EHL	70	14	11	25	41	—	—	—	—	—
1967–68	California/Oakland Seals	NHL	2	0	0	0	0	—	—	—	—	—
1968–69	Ottawa Nationals	OHA Sr	8	6	6	12	0	—	—	—	—	—
1969–70	Servette Genève	NLA	—	—	—	—	—	—	—	—	—	—
1970–71	Servette Genève	NLA	21	15	7	22	—	—	—	—	—	—
1970–71	Sherbrooke Castors	QUE Sr	—	—	—	—	—	—	—	—	—	—
1971–72	Servette Genève	NLA	22	16	13	29	—	—	—	—	—	—
1972–73	Servette Genève	NLA	28	22	14	36	—	—	—	—	—	—
1973–74	Servette Genève	NLA	27	16	12	28	—	—	—	—	—	—
1974–75	SC Langnau	NLA	21	9	7	16	—	—	—	—	—	—
1975–76	SC Langnau	NLA	28	18	6	24	—	—	—	—	—	—
1976–77	HC La Chaux-de-Fonds	NLA	—	—	—	—	—	—	—	—	—	—
1977–78	HC La Chaux-de-Fonds	NLA	—	—	—	—	—	—	—	—	—	—
1978–79	HC La Chaux-de-Fonds	NLA	—	—	—	—	—	—	—	—	—	—
NHL totals			2	0	0	0	0	—	—	—	—	—

=== International ===
Medal record

World Championships
Bronze medal – third place	1967 Vienna	Ice hockey

Year	Team	Event	GP	G	A	Pts	PIM
1967	Canada	WC	7	3	0	3	0
Senior totals			7	3	0	3	0
