= Bob Lindberg =

American ice hockey player (born 1945)

- Born: December 31, 1945 Minneapolis, Minnesota, USA
- Height: 6 ft 1 in (185 cm)
- Weight: 187 lb (85 kg; 13 st 5 lb)
- Position: Left wing
- Played for: Colorado College; Johnstown Jets; Fort Wayne Komets; Lausanne HC; EHC Biel; ZSC Lions
- National team: United States
- NHL draft: Undrafted
- Playing career: 1964–1982

Robert William Lindberg is an American retired ice hockey left wing and coach who was a two-time All-American for Colorado College and played in three separate World Championships.

== Career ==
Lindberg graduated from Roosevelt High School in 1963 and began attending Colorado College that fall. He was a member of Bob Johnson's first recruiting class and began playing with the varsity club the following year. Unfortunately, the Tigers didn't have any success under Johnson and the team finished last in the WCHA. The poor performance continued for the remainder of Lindberg's tenure with the team, despite switching head coaches before his senior season, but Lindberg was able to stand out from the rest of his teammates. He led the team in scoring as a junior with 41 points and was named an All-American despite not appearing on either All-WCHA Team. He repeated his performance in 1967, adding All-conference honors as well.

After graduating, Lindberg played senior hockey for a couple of seasons and was selected for the US national team at the 1970 Ice Hockey World Championships. Team USA had been relegated the year before and needed to win its bracket have a chance at a gold medal. Lindberg scored 6 points in 7 games as the US swept through their schedule, finishing undefeated and were promoted. Lindberg finished out the season playing for the Fort Wayne Komets but found himself chosen for the national team again the following year. Against much stiffer competition, Lindberg could only record a single assist and the US was relegated to pool B again.

Lindberg remained in Switzerland and continued his playing career after the tournament. He played for four different Swiss clubs over the succeeding 12 years, beginning as a player-coach in the second league. Once he made his way to the National League he found great success with EHC Biel, winning the Swiss league championship in 1978 and 1981. While he was serving as a player-coach in the Swiss B-league, Lindberg was invited to his third World Championships as the US attempted to get promoted back to the top bracket once more. Linberg provided depths scoring for Team USA, but the squad could only finish in second place and had to watch East Germany be advanced to the top bracket.

== Career statistics ==
=== Regular season and playoffs ===
			Regular Season					Playoffs
Season	Team	League	GP	G	A	Pts	PIM	GP	G	A	Pts	PIM
1962–63	Roosevelt High School	MN-HS	—	—	—	—	—	—	—	—	—	—
1964–65	Colorado College	WCHA	—	11	11	22	—	—	—	—	—	—
1965–66	Colorado College	WCHA	—	26	15	41	—	—	—	—	—	—
1966–67	Colorado College	WCHA	—	22	22	44	—	—	—	—	—	—
1967–68	Minnesota Nationals	USHL	—	—	—	—	—	—	—	—	—	—
1968–69	Johnstown Jets	EHL	33	13	14	27	4	—	—	—	—	—
1969–70	Fort Wayne Komets	IHL	10	2	4	6	7	—	—	—	—	—
1970–71	HC Sion	NLB	—	—	—	—	—	—	—	—	—	—
1971–72	HC Sion	NLB	—	—	—	—	—	—	—	—	—	—
1972–73	Lausanne HC	NLB	—	—	—	—	—	—	—	—	—	—
1973–74	Lausanne HC	NLB	—	—	—	—	—	—	—	—	—	—
1974–75	Lausanne HC	NLB	—	—	—	—	—	—	—	—	—	—
1975–76	EHC Biel	NLA	28	20	23	43	—	—	—	—	—	—
1976–77	ZSC Lions	NLB	—	—	—	—	—	—	—	—	—	—
1977–78	EHC Biel	NLA	20	21	17	38	—	—	—	—	—	—
1978–79	EHC Biel	NLA	28	19	15	34	—	—	—	—	—	—
1979–80	EHC Biel	NLA	—	11	6	17	—	—	—	—	—	—
1980–81	EHC Biel	NLA	—	—	—	—	—	—	—	—	—	—
1981–82	EHC Biel	NLA	—	—	—	—	—	—	—	—	—	—
NCAA Totals			79	59	48	107	—	—	—	—	—	—

=== International ===
Year	Team	GP	G	A	Pts	PIM
1970	United States	7	3	3	6	2
1971	United States	7	0	1	1	2
1973	United States	7	1	3	4	2

== Awards and honors ==
Award	Year
AHCA West All-American	1965–66
All-WCHA Second team	1966–67
AHCA West All-American	1966–67
