= Bibi Torriani =

Swiss ice hockey player and coach and luge athlete (1911–1988)

- Torriani recites the Olympic oath at the start of the 1948 Winter Olympic Games in St. Moritz.
- Born: Richard Torriani; 1 October 1911; St. Moritz, Switzerland
- Died: 3 September 1988 (aged 76); Chur, Switzerland
- Awards: IIHF Hall of Fame (1997)
- Honors: Torriani Award
Ice hockey career
- Position: Right wing
- Played for: HC Davos; EHC St. Moritz
- National team: Switzerland
- Playing career: 1927–1950
Medal record
Ice hockey at the Olympic Games
Bronze medal – third place	1928 St. Moritz	Men's team
Bronze medal – third place	1948 St. Moritz	Men's team
Ice Hockey World Championships
Bronze medal – third place	1930 Chamonix/Berlin	Men's team
Silver medal – second place	1935 Davos	Men's team
Bronze medal – third place	1939 Switzerland	Men's team
Ice Hockey European Championships
Bronze medal – third place	1932 Berlin	Men's team
World Luge Championships
Silver medal – second place	1957 Davos	Men's singles

Richard "Bibi" Torriani (1 October 1911 – 3 September 1988) was a Swiss ice hockey player and coach, and luge athlete, also known as Riccardo Torriani.

He played for HC Davos from 1929 to 1950, and served as captain of the Switzerland men's national ice hockey team from 1933 to 1939. He scored 105 goals in 111 international matches for the national team, won two bronze medals in ice hockey at the Olympic Games and won an additional four medals at the Ice Hockey World Championships. Playing for HC Davos, he won 18 Swiss championships and six Spengler Cups. He was chosen as the flag bearer for Switzerland at the 1948 Winter Olympics, and recited the Olympic Oath at the same games hosted in St. Moritz.

He later served as head coach of the Switzerland and Italy men's national ice hockey teams, and led EHC Visp to a National League A championship. He won a silver medal competing in men's singles at the FIL World Luge Championships 1957 held in Davos, Switzerland.

He is considered the best Swiss ice hockey player ever, and was inducted into the inaugural class of the IIHF Hall of Fame in 1997. He is the namesake of the Torriani Award, given by the International Ice Hockey Federation since 2015 to recognize a player for a great international playing career.

== Early life ==
Torriani was born on 1 October 1911, in St. Moritz, Switzerland. He was nicknamed "Bibi" as a youth, due to being the youngest child and baby of his family. He played youth hockey in St. Moritz as a right winger, and was also known by the name "Riccardo".

== Playing career ==
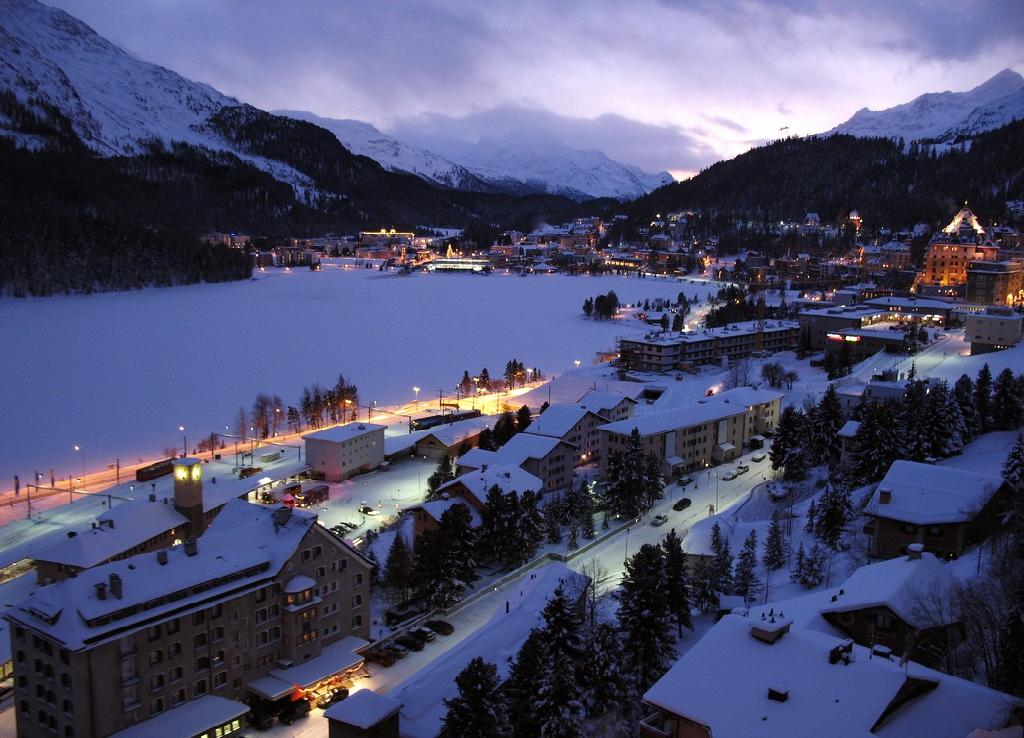
St. Moritz (pictured), where Torriani was born, and competed in the 1928 and 1948 Winter Olympic Games

Torriani's professional career began as a member of EHC St. Moritz during the 1927–28, and 1928–29 seasons. In his first season with St. Moritz, he won the 1927–28 Swiss National Ice Hockey Championship.

Torriani was selected to play for the Switzerland men's national ice hockey team at age 16, since the 1928 Winter Olympics were hosted in St. Moritz and the national team did not incur extra expenses to include exceptional local talent. He scored one goal in four games played in ice hockey at the 1928 Winter Olympics, and won a bronze medal with the national team. His appearance in the Olympics made him the youngest person to compete at a senior Ice Hockey World Championship.

Torriani joined HC Davos after his father died in 1929, and remained with the team until 1950. He made his Ice Hockey World Championships debut in 1930 with Switzerland, and scored one goal at the 1930 World Ice Hockey Championships, and won a bronze medal. Switzerland opted not to participate in ice hockey at the 1932 Winter Olympics. Torriani and the national team participated at the Ice Hockey European Championship 1932 instead, and Switzerland won the bronze.

Torriani served as the Switzerland national team captain from 1933 to 1939. He played on a forward line known as "The ni-storm" (German: Der ni-sturm), with brothers Hans Cattini and Ferdinand Cattini. The line was named for the last syllable (-ni) of players' surnames. The ni-storm was regarded as the top line of HC Davos and Switzerland's national hockey team from 1933 to 1950. On this line, he scored five goals in six games at the 1933 Ice Hockey World Championships, 14 goals in seven games at the 1934 World Ice Hockey Championships, and eight goals in eight games at the 1935 Ice Hockey World Championships. Torriani led Switzerland to a silver medal at the 1935 championships, and a bronze medal at the 1939 Ice Hockey World Championships. He also competed in ice hockey at the 1936 Winter Olympics, playing in three games with no goals scored. During summers, Torriani maintained fitness by riding bicycles in the mountains with his Davos teammates.

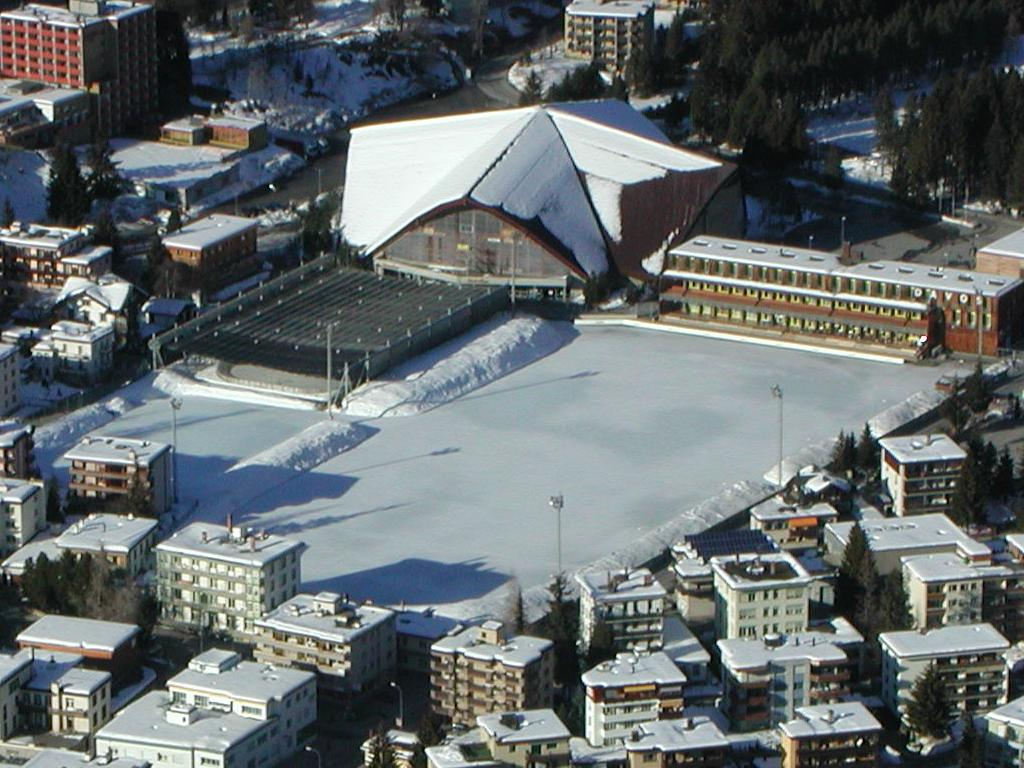
Eisstadion Davos (pictured), where Torriani played and later coached with HC Davos

Torriani also played with HC Davos in international ice hockey competitions. The hosted the annual Spengler Cup tournament, which he won six times, in 1933, 1936, 1938, 1941, 1942 and 1943. HC Davos placed third at the Winter Sports Week held in February 1941, in Garmisch-Partenkirchen. HC Davos and Torriani won the Grand Prix of Berlin in March 1941, which included other club teams from Europe. HC Davos defeated Berliner Schlittschuhclub and Rotweiss Berlin, and then defeated Hammarby Hockey by a 4–2 score in the championship game. In 1943, HC Davos participated in a Gebirgsjäger tournament, versus other players from Germany, Italy and Sweden.

Torriani was chosen as the flag bearer for Switzerland at the 1948 Winter Olympics hosted in St. Moritz. He was also chosen to recite the Olympic Oath on behalf of all athletes participating, and became the first hockey player to do so at the Olympic Games. (Note: Hayley Wickenheiser became the second hockey player to recite the Olympic Oath at the 2010 Winter Olympic Games.) He then scored two goals, four assists, and six points in five games, and led Switzerland to the bronze medal in ice hockey at the 1948 Winter Olympics.

Torriani retired from playing in 1950. During his career, he won 18 Swiss championships with HC Davos, and played 111 international matches for Switzerland's national team and scored 105 goals. His ni-storm line had played 239 international matches together and combined for 246 goals scored.

== Coaching career ==
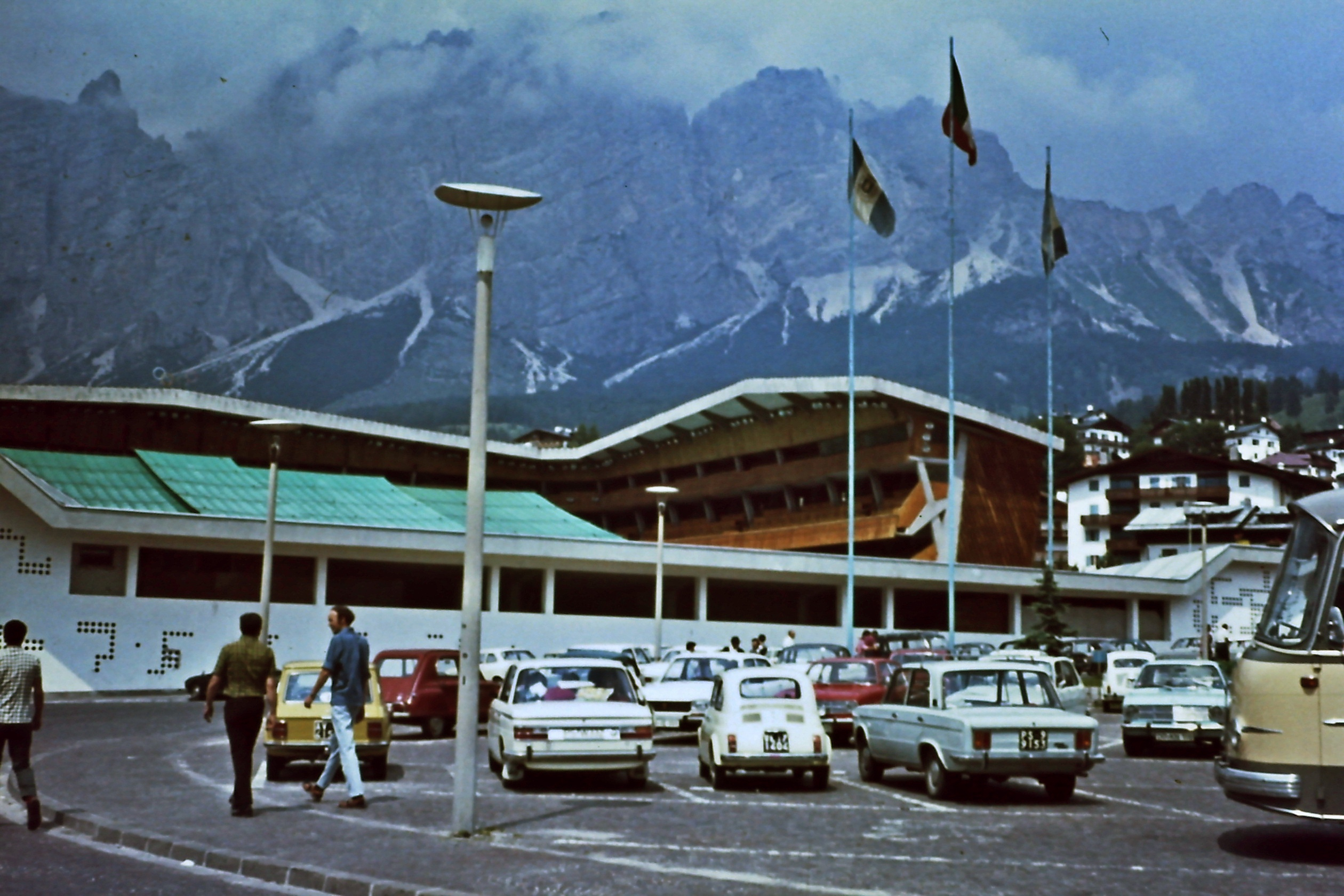
Ice hockey rink (pictured) for the 1956 Winter Olympic Games in Cortina d'Ampezzo

Torriani served as head coach of the Switzerland men's national ice hockey team in 1946–47, and again from 1948–49 to 1951–52. Under his leadership, the national team finished fourth in Group A at the 1947 Ice Hockey World Championships, fifth in Group A at the 1949 World Ice Hockey Championships, third in Group A at the 1950 World Ice Hockey Championships, third in Group A at the 1951 Ice Hockey World Championships, and fifth overall in ice hockey at the 1952 Winter Olympics in Oslo, Norway.

From 1954–55 to 1955–56, Torriani coached the Italy men's national ice hockey team. He led to team to a first-place finish in Group B at the 1955 World Ice Hockey Championships, and a promotion to Group A. Cortina d'Ampezzo, Italy, hosted ice hockey at the 1956 Winter Olympics. Before the games, his team was strengthened by players of Italian descent who had trained in Canada. Torriani led Italy to a third-place finish and Group A, and seventh place overall by winning the consolation round.

Torriani coached in the European professional leagues from 1957 to 1971. His first team was SC Riessersee during the 1957–58 season, which he led to an undefeated regular season and a first-place finish in the South group of the German Oberliga, and a second overall finish in the champions pool. He remained in Germany for the 1958–59 season, and coached Mannheimer ERC to a third-place finish in the Eishockey-Bundesliga. He moved to Italy in the 1959–60 season to coach Diavoli HC Milano. He led Diavoli to a first-place finish in the Italian Hockey League - Serie A during the regular season.

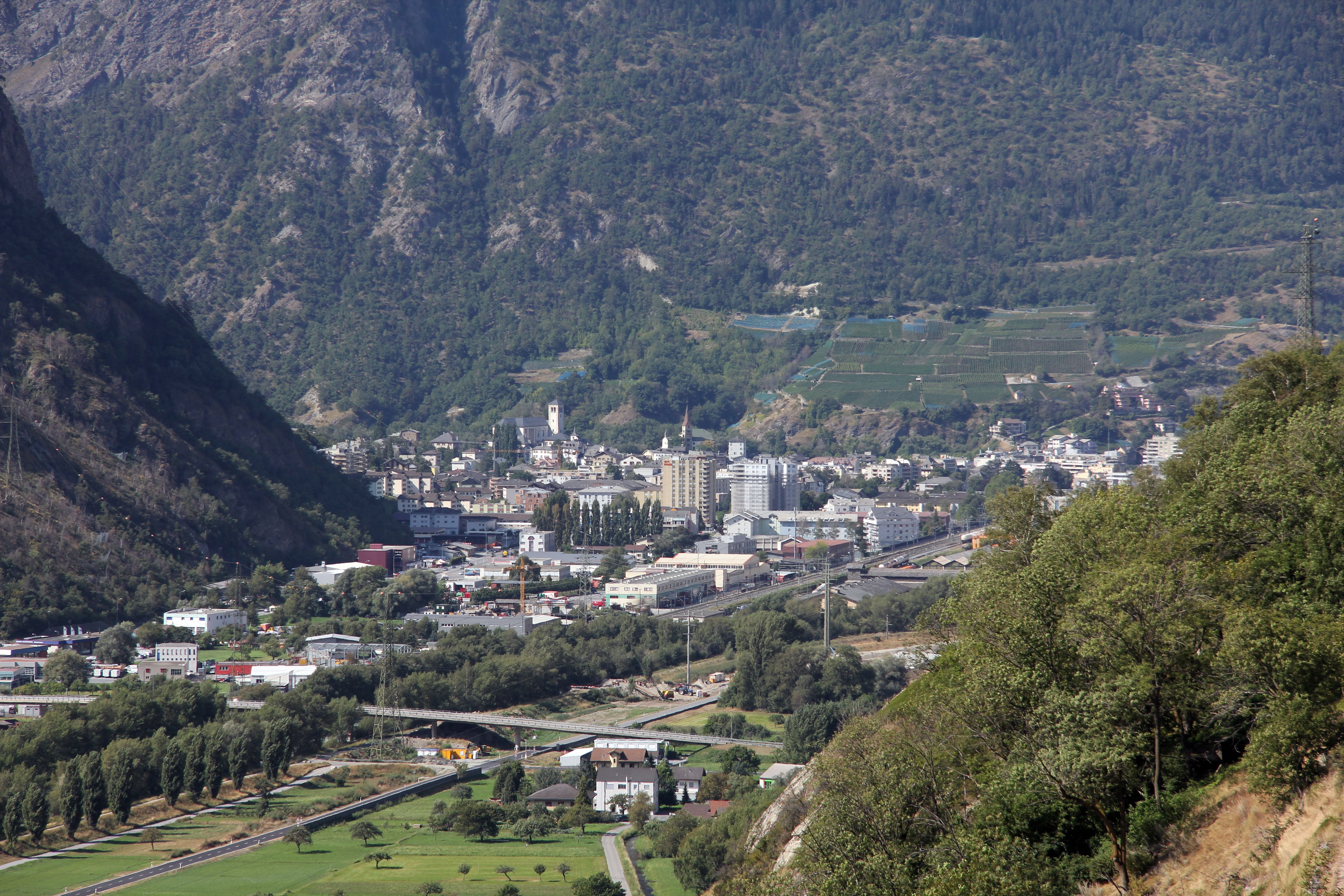
Torriani coached in Visp (pictured) for five seasons.

Torriani returned to coaching in Switzerland in 1960, and led EHC Visp for five seasons in National League A until 1965. His first year coaching resulted in a second-place finish in the 1960–61 season. In the 1961–62 season, he led EHC Visp to a first-place finish in the standings, and captured the National League A championship. His team followed up the championship finishing second place in both the 1962–63 season and the 1963–64 season. In his fifth year coaching, EHC Visp dropped to seventh place in the 1964–65 season.

After one year away from coaching, Torriani led HC Lugano during the 1966–67 season, finishing the season third place in the east group of National League B. He returned to HC Lugano for the 1969–70 season, and led the team to another third-place finish in the east group of National League B. Torriani's final season coaching was with HC Davos in the 1970–71 season. He led the team to a second-place finish in the east group of National League B.

== Personal life ==
Torriani's older brother Conrad also played for EHC St. Moritz and the Switzerland men's national ice hockey team. The brothers were teammates at the Ice Hockey World Championships in 1930, 1933, 1934, and the 1932 Ice Hockey European Championship.

Torriani won a silver medal competing in men's singles at the FIL World Luge Championships 1957 held in Davos, Switzerland.

Torriani encouraged his sons to learn figure skating in preparation for playing hockey. Two of his sons were involved in Swiss hockey. Romano Torriani played for EHC Basel and HC Davos, and Marco played for EHC Basel and SC Langnau Tigers, and later became president of Genève-Servette HC. As a manager, Marco helped Geneva earn a promotion from Swiss League 1 to National League A.

Torriani died on 3 September 1988, in Chur, Switzerland at age 76.

== Honors and legacy ==
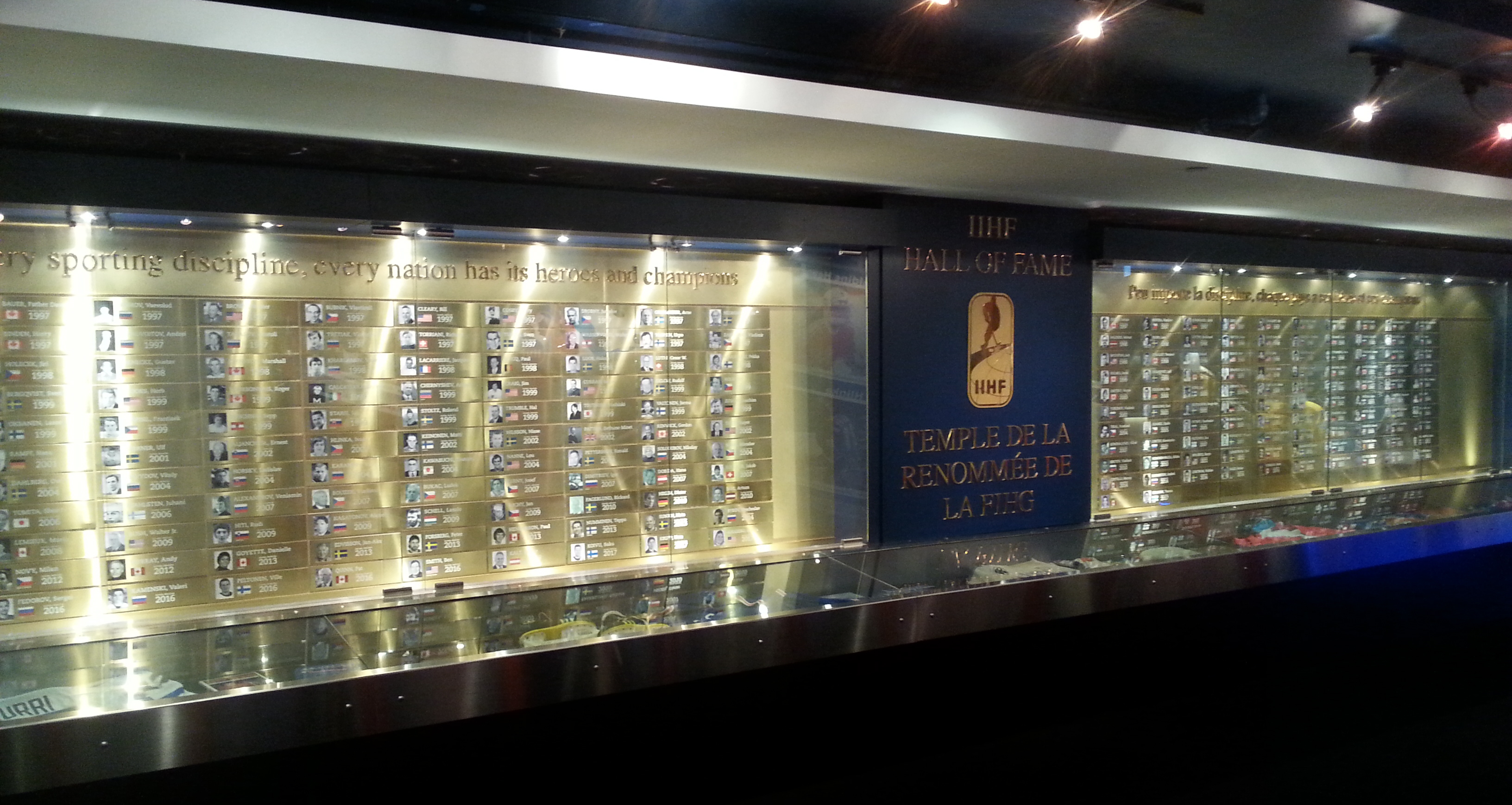
IIHF Hall of Fame honor roll

Torriani is considered the best Swiss ice hockey player ever, and has been inducted into the HC Davos Hall of Fame. He was posthumously inducted into the inaugural class of the IIHF Hall of Fame in 1997 as a player, and was the first Swiss to be honored. He is the namesake of the Bibi Torriani Cup, an annual competition for players aged 14 representing various Cantons of Switzerland. The event is used to identify future players for the national team program.

The International Ice Hockey Federation (IIHF) established the Torriani Award in 2015, named after Torriani. When the new award was announced, the IIHF president René Fasel said; "We wanted to create a trophy which honours players for a great international career irrespective of where they played. Nowadays, with NHL players and international players often being the same, we feel that there are so many top players to honour. Still, we wanted to ensure we recognized players who didn't necessarily win Olympic and World Championship medals but who still had remarkable careers. As a result, we created the Torriani Award, and Lucio Topatigh is a very worthy first recipient".

For the 100th anniversary of the Ice Hockey World Championships in 2020, Torriani was named to the IIHF All-time Switzerland team.

== See also ==
- List of Olympic men's ice hockey players for Switzerland
