= Markus Graf =

Swiss ice hockey player, coach, and executive (born 1959)

- Born: 24 July 1959 (age 66); Biel, Switzerland
- Occupations: Ice hockey executive and coach
- Known for: Swiss Ice Hockey Federation; International Ice Hockey Federation
- Awards: Johan Bollue Award (2024)
Ice hockey career
- Height: 178 cm (5 ft 10 in)
- Weight: 78 kg (172 lb; 12 st 4 lb)
- Position: Forward
- Shot: Left
- Played for: SC Langnau; HC Lugano; EHC Olten
- Coached for: EHC Olten; EHC Biel
- Playing career: 1975–2016
- Coaching career: 1992–2002

Markus Rudolf Graf (born 24 July 1959) is a Swiss former ice hockey player, coach, and executive. Prior to a professional career in Switzerland, he represented his country internationally on the under-18 team and the men's junior team. In six seasons for SC Langnau in the Nationalliga A, he won a silver medal and was voted an all-time legend by the team's fans. He won the Nationalliga A championship twice with HC Lugano, then played for EHC Olten before transitioning into a player-coach in lower-level leagues.

Graf later coached EHC Olten and EHC Biel in the Nationalliga B, was an executive with the SCL Tigers, then served as the international youth hockey supervisor for the Swiss Ice Hockey Federation (SIHF) for 16 years, and was on the International Ice Hockey Federation (IIHF) coaching and development committee. He created the guidelines for training junior hockey players, which then formed the approach to training the Switzerland men's national ice hockey team. Later in his career, he focused on the training of coaches, and was the interim chief executive officer of the SIHF until retirement in 2024. He received the Johan Bollue Award from the IIHF, for international programs to develop youth players.

== Early life and junior hockey ==
Markus Rudolf Graf was born on 24 July 1959, in Biel, Switzerland. (Note: Full name: Markus Rudolf Graf; Birth date: 24 July 1959; Birth place: Biel, Switzerland) Growing up playing ice hockey in Switzerland, he was left-shooting forward listed at 178 centimetres (5 ft 10 in), and 78 kilograms (172 lb). (Note: Playing position as a forward: Lefthanded shooter; Height 5ft 10in, Weight 172lbs [178 cm/78 kg].) He played internationally for the Switzerland under-18 team in 1976, and at the 1977 European Championship in Germany. He later played for the Switzerland men's national junior team at the 1978 World Junior Championships in Canada.

== Professional hockey career ==
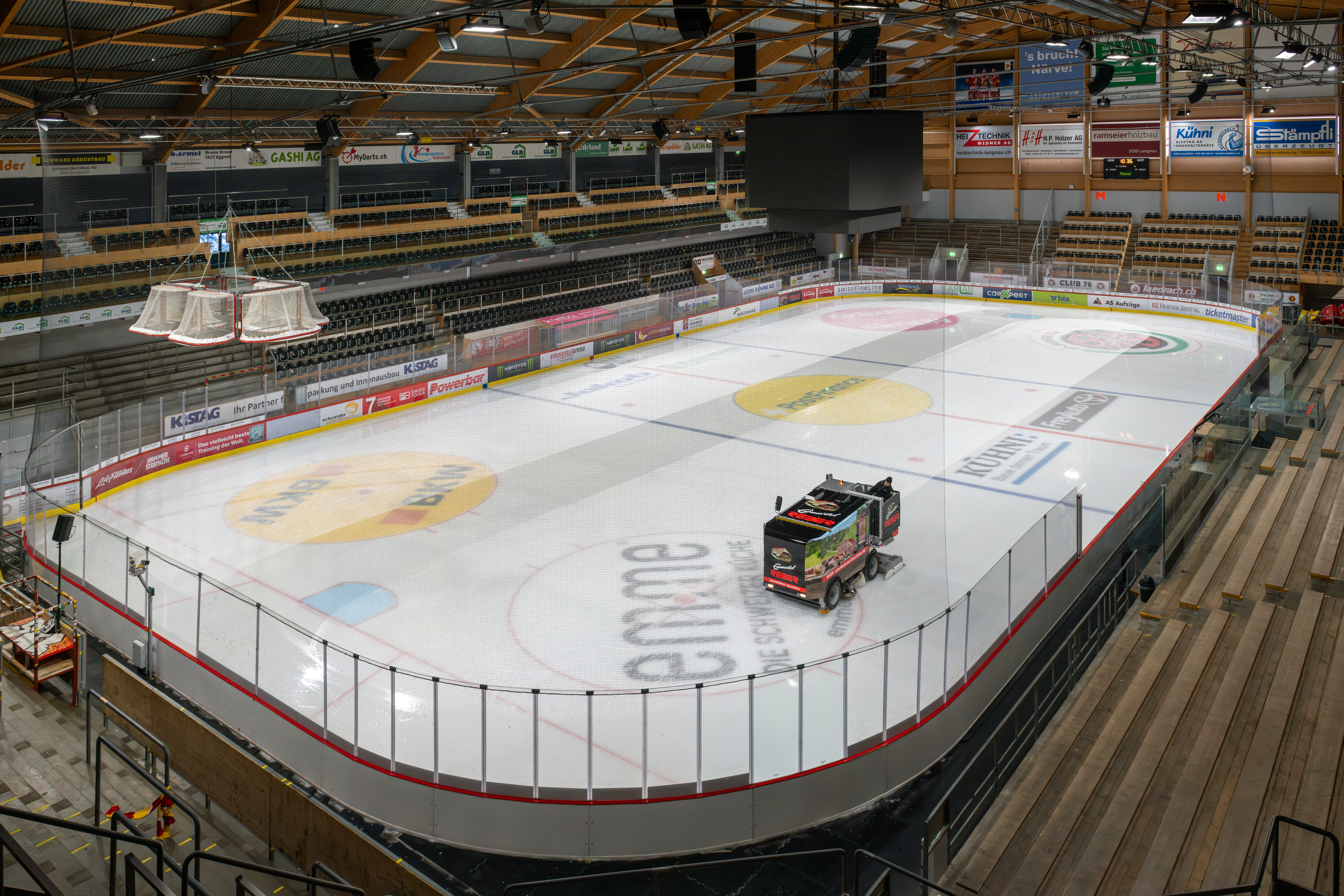
Emmental Versicherung Arena, home rink of SC Langnau

Turning professional, Graf played six seasons for SC Langnau in the Nationalliga A from 1977 to 1983. In his first season with Langnau, the team finished second in the league winning a silver medal, one point away from first place and the gold medal. Wearing uniform #15, fans voted him one of the team's 75 "all-time legends" during Langnau's 75th anniversary season in 2022.

In 1983, Graf began two seasons playing with EHC Thun-Steffisburg in the Swiss 1st League. In his first season, EHC Thun-Steffisburg placed second in Group 3, but lost in the playoffs for promotion to Nationalliga B. In the 1984–85 season, he scored a career best 42 goals, 35 assists, and 77 points.

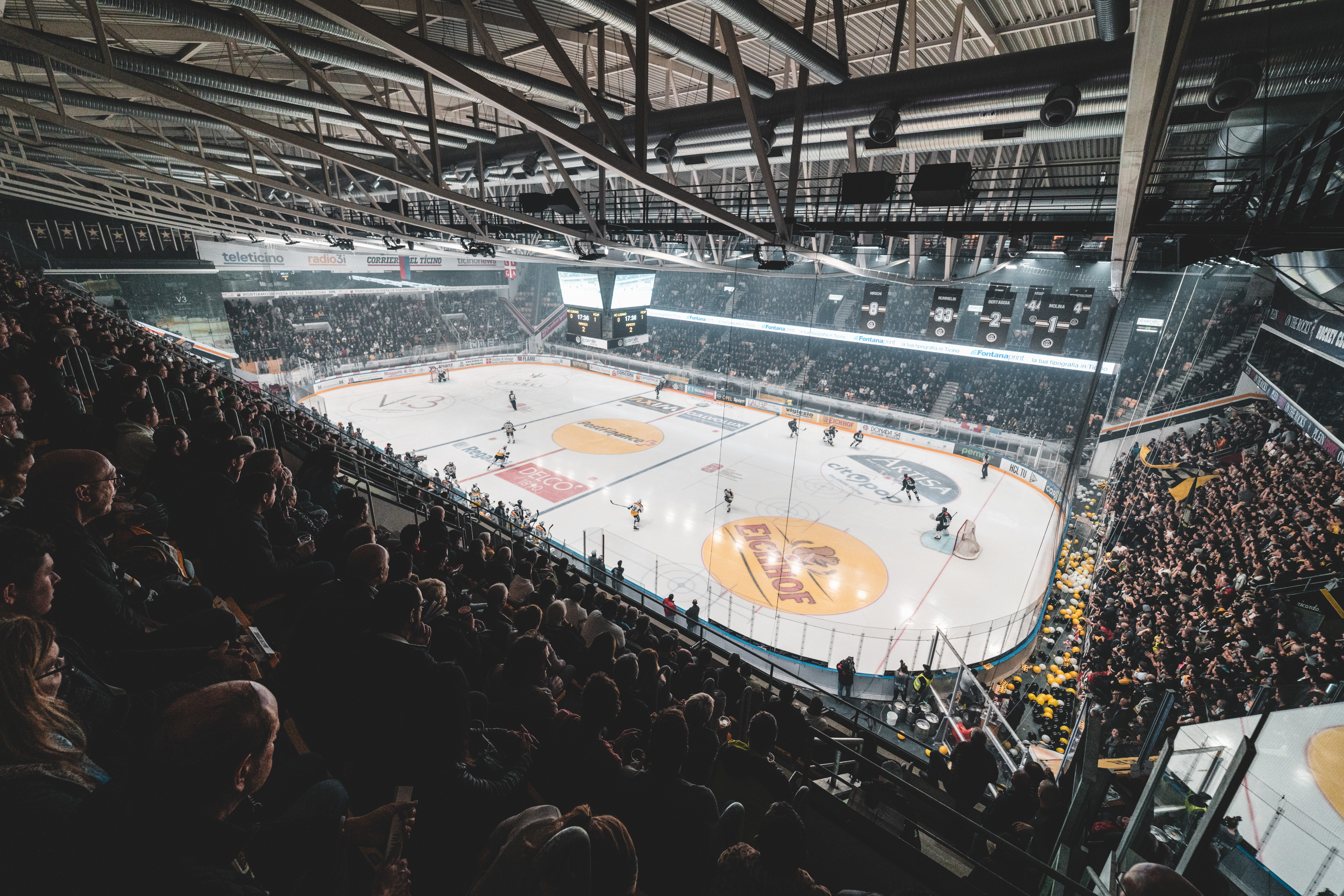
Cornèr Arena, home rink of HC Lugano

Returning to the Nationalliga A, Graf played the next two seasons with HC Lugano, winning the league championship twice. HC Lugano placed first during the 1985–86 season, and defeated HC Sierre and HC Davos to win the playoffs. HC Lugano finished in first place again during the 1986–87 season, then defeated HC Ambrì-Piotta and EHC Kloten for the playoffs championship.

Graf played for EHC Olten in the 1987–88 Nationalliga B season, where he scored 27 goals and 52 points in 36 games. He helped EHC Olten to a third-place finish in the regular season, and playoffs series wins versus SC Rapperswil-Jona Lakers and HC Ajoie to earn promotion to Nationalliga A for the next season. He played the next four seasons in Nationalliga A, placing seventh in the 1988–89 season and fifth in the 1989–90 season, but saw first-round playoffs losses both seasons versus EHC Kloten. In the 1990–91 season, EHC Olten finished in last place, but won the six-team relegation/promotion playoffs to remained in Nationalliga A. Placing ninth in the 1991–92 season, Graf was unable to help EHC Olten avoid relegation again when the team placed third in the six-team relegation/promotion playoffs. Competing in the 1992–93 Nationalliga B season, he helped EHC Olten place second of ten teams.

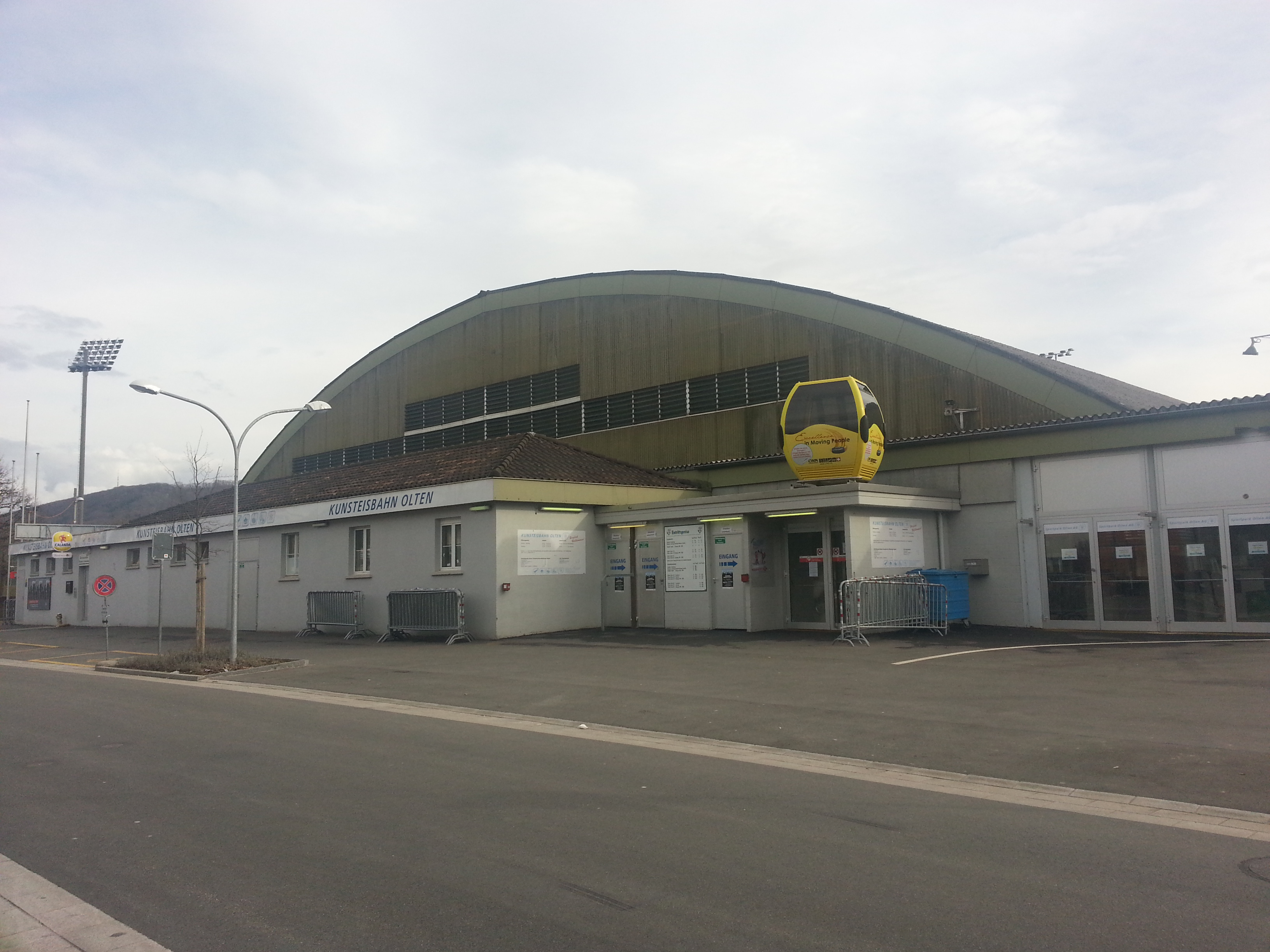
Kleinholz Stadion, home rink of EHC Olten

While playing for EHC Olten, Graf became head coach of EHC Rheinfelden in the Swiss 2nd League in 1992. He led them to 9 points in 18 games during the 1992–93 season, but a ninth-place finish of ten teams in the Central Division meant that the team was demoted to Swiss 3rd League. From 1993 to 1997, Graf was the player-coach of EHC Rheinfelden.

During the 1995–96 Nationalliga B season, Graf was named head coach of EHC Olten, replacing Fyodor Kanareykin in January 1996. Graf coached the final 12 games in the regular season, winning three games, with EHC Olten placing ninth in the league. The team finished two points below the eight place team, and did not qualify for the playoffs. He returned as head coach of EHC Olten for the 1997–98 season, and led them to 17 wins and 39 points in 40 games, and sixth-place standing in the league. His team lost in the first playoffs round three-games-to-one versus HC Thurgau. In the 1998–99 season, he coached EHC Olten to 21 wins and 44 points in 40 games, and a third-place finish. He led his team to a first-round playoffs victory in three consecutive games versus SC Säntis, then lost in the second round three-games-to-two versus HC La Chaux-de-Fonds.

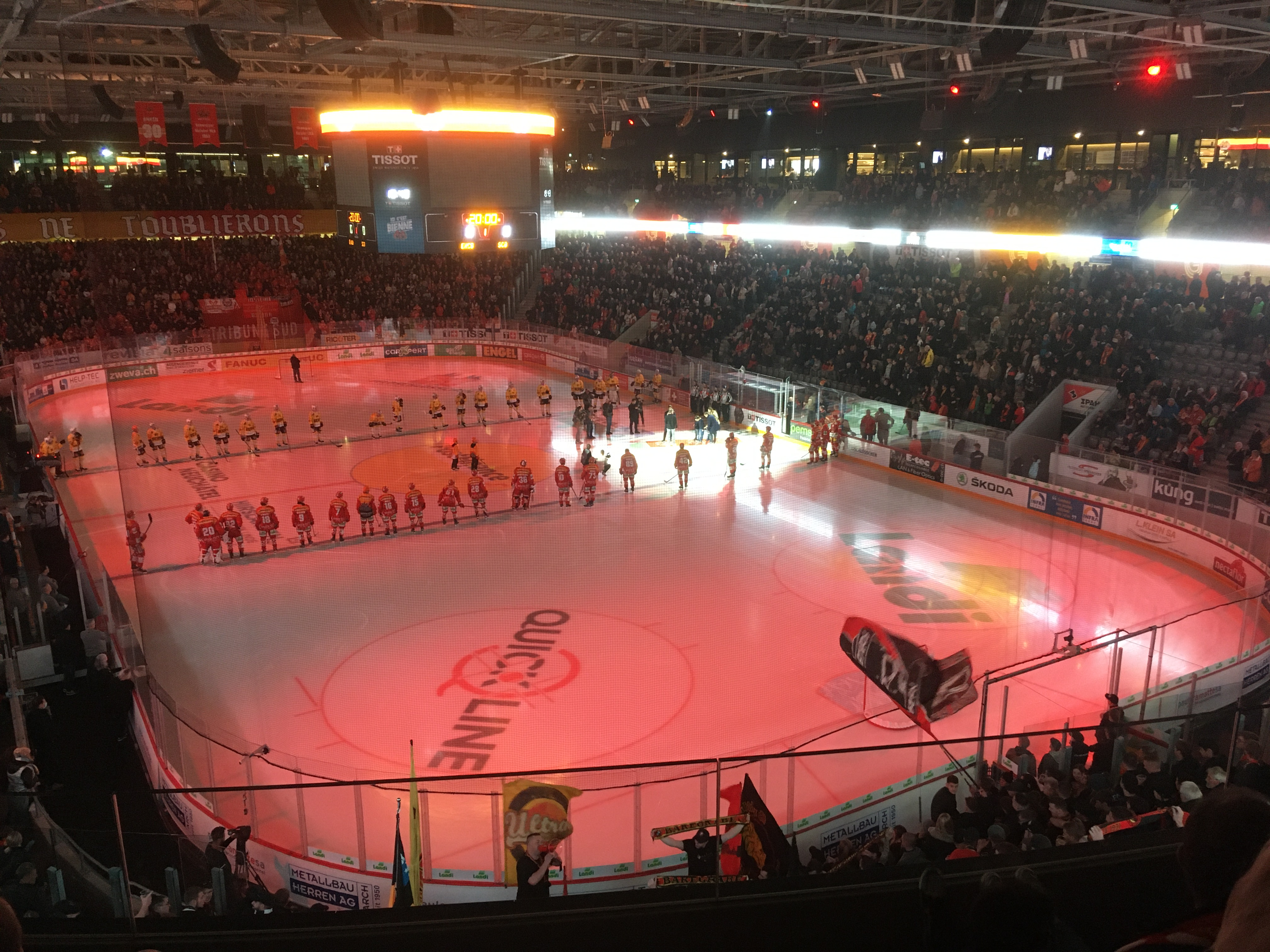
Tissot Arena, home rink of EHC Biel

Graf returned as a head coach in Nationalliga B, leading EHC Biel for the 2000–01 season. His team earned 26 wins and 57 points in 40 games, placing second in the league. He led EHC Biel to a three-games-to-one first-round playoffs victory versus HC Ajoie, a second-round victory versus Genève-Servette Hockey Club by three-games-to-one, then a loss in the finals by three consecutive games versus Lausanne HC. He was released on head coach on 14 February 2002. With only two games remaining in the 2001–02 season, Graf's team had 20 wins and 41 points, and was in third place. According to Gino Cavallini who played for EHC Biel, Graf was big on fitness and had his players do two-hour runs in the mountains.

Graf became the sports manager of the SCL Tigers for the 2002–03 Nationalliga A season, and subsequently as the team's director of player development for the 2004–05 and 2005–06 seasons. He later played parts of eight seasons for EHC Rubigen in the Swiss 3rd League from 2006 to 2016.

=== Swiss league playing statistics ===
			Regular season					Playoffs
Season	Team	League	GP	G	A	Pts	PIM	GP	G	A	Pts	PIM
1977–78	SC Langnau	NLA	18	5	5	10	–	–	–	–	–	–
1978–79	SC Langnau	NLA	28	10	10	20	–	–	–	–	–	–
1979–80	SC Langnau	NLA	25	13	15	28	–	–	–	–	–	–
1980–81	SC Langnau	NLA	33	7	9	16	–	–	–	–	–	–
1981–82	SC Langnau	NLA	–	–	–	–	–	–	–	–	–	–
1982–83	SC Langnau	NLA	–	–	–	–	–	–	–	–	–	–
1983–84	EHC Thun-Steffisburg	Swiss 1st	–	–	–	–	–	–	–	–	–	–
1984–85	EHC Thun-Steffisburg	Swiss 1st	26	42	35	77	22	–	–	–	–	–
1985–86	HC Lugano	NLA	29	7	6	13	16	4	0	1	1	2
1986–87	HC Lugano	NLA	36	6	6	12	20	6	1	0	1	2
1987–88	EHC Olten	NLB	36	27	25	52	20	5	2	4	6	4
1988–89	EHC Olten	NLA	34	14	26	40	24	2	1	2	3	0
1989–90	EHC Olten	NLA	34	15	16	31	20	2	0	0	0	2
1990–91	EHC Olten	NLA	34	14	9	23	30	9	3	6	9	8
1991–92	EHC Olten	NLA	33	6	10	16	18	10	4	6	10	8
1992–93	EHC Olten	NLB	33	4	6	10	26	7	1	0	1	2
1993–94	EHC Rheinfelden	Swiss 3rd	–	–	–	–	–	–	–	–	–	–
1994–95	EHC Rheinfelden	Swiss 3rd	–	–	–	–	–	–	–	–	–	–
1995–96	EHC Rheinfelden	Swiss 3rd	–	–	–	–	–	–	–	–	–	–
1996–97	EHC Rheinfelden	Swiss 3rd	–	–	–	–	–	–	–	–	–	–
2006–07	EHC Rubigen	Swiss 3rd	7	6	10	16	0	–	–	–	–	–
2007–08	EHC Rubigen	Swiss 3rd	11	8	16	24	34	–	–	–	–	–
2008–09	EHC Rubigen	Swiss 3rd	10	14	16	30	0	–	–	–	–	–
2009–10	EHC Rubigen	Swiss 3rd	10	14	15	29	8	–	–	–	–	–
2010–11	EHC Rubigen	Swiss 3rd	3	1	1	2	0	–	–	–	–	–
2011–12	EHC Rubigen	Swiss 3rd	2	1	1	2	0	–	–	–	–	–
2012–13	EHC Rubigen	Swiss 3rd	1	0	2	2	0	–	–	–	–	–
2013–14	EHC Rubigen	Swiss 3rd	1	0	0	0	0	–	–	–	–	–
2015–16	EHC Rubigen	Swiss 3rd	1	1	1	2	0	–	–	–	–	–

=== International playing statistics ===
Year	Team	Event	GP	G	A	Pts	PIM
1977	Switzerland under-18 team	European Juniors	–	–	–	–	–
1978	Switzerland junior team	World Juniors	6	0	0	0	0

=== Coaching statistics ===
Season	Team	League	Regular season						Playoffs	Source
Season	Team	League	Games	Wins	Losses	Ties	Points	Standing	Result	Source
1992–93	EHC Rheinfelden	Swiss 2nd	18	–	–	–	9	9th in Central	Relegated to 3rd League	
1993–94	EHC Rheinfelden	Swiss 3rd	–	–	–	–	–	–	–	–
1994–95	EHC Rheinfelden	Swiss 3rd	–	–	–	–	–	–	–	–
1995–96	EHC Rheinfelden	Swiss 3rd	–	–	–	–	–	–	–	–
1995–96	EHC Olten	NLB	12	3	9	0	6	9th in NLB	Did not qualify	(Note: Totals include results from 7 January 1996, to 13 February 1996.)
1996–97	EHC Rheinfelden	Swiss 3rd	–	–	–	–	–	–	–	–
1997–98	EHC Olten	NLB	40	17	18	5	39	6th in NLB	Lost in first round	
1998–99	EHC Olten	NLB	40	21	17	2	44	3rd in NLB	Lost in second round	
2000–01	EHC Biel	NLB	40	26	9	5	57	2nd in NLB	Lost in finals	
2001–02	EHC Biel	NLB	34	20	13	1	41	3rd in NLB	Released 14 February 2002	(Note: Totals include results until 12 February 2002, with two regular season games remaining.)

== Swiss Ice Hockey Federation ==
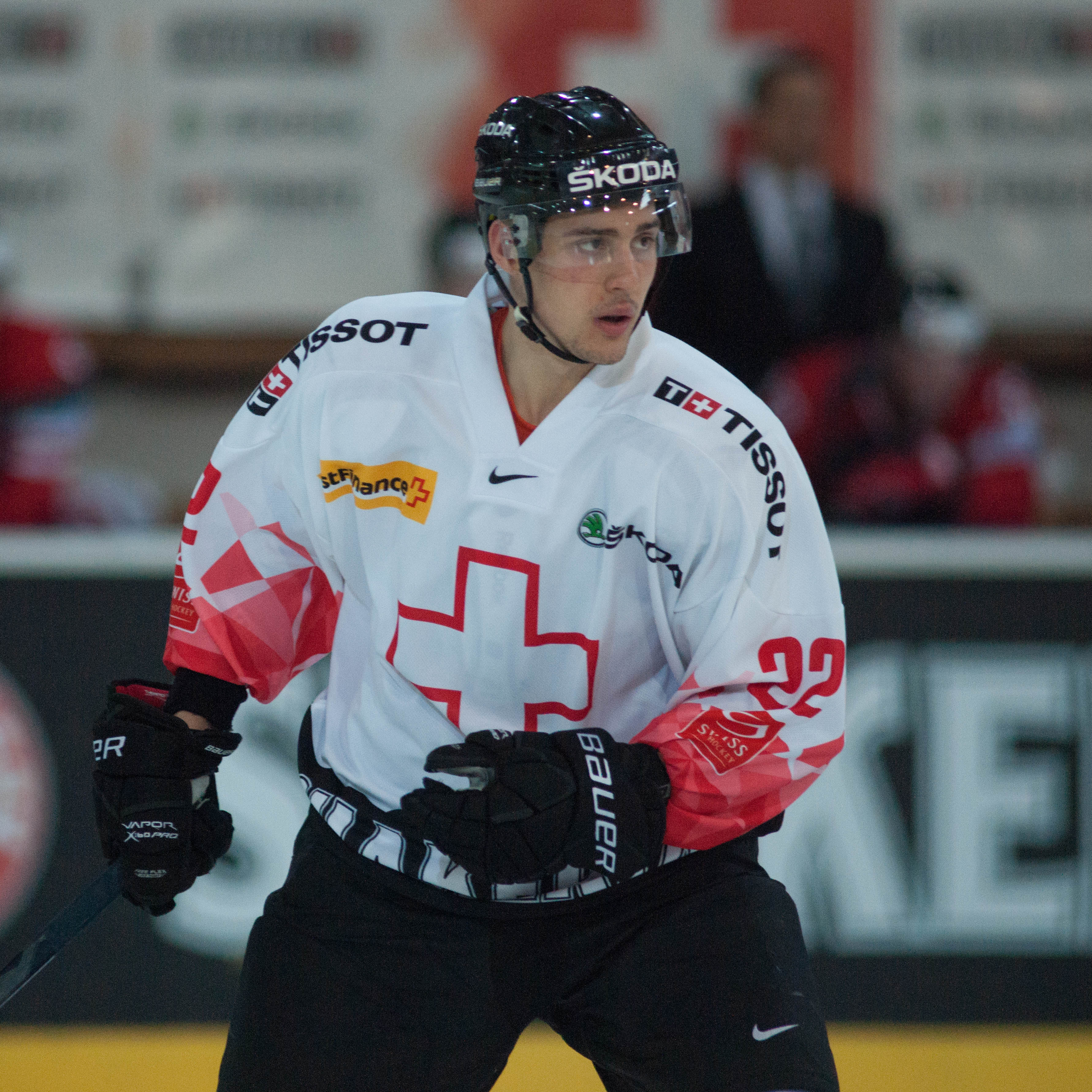
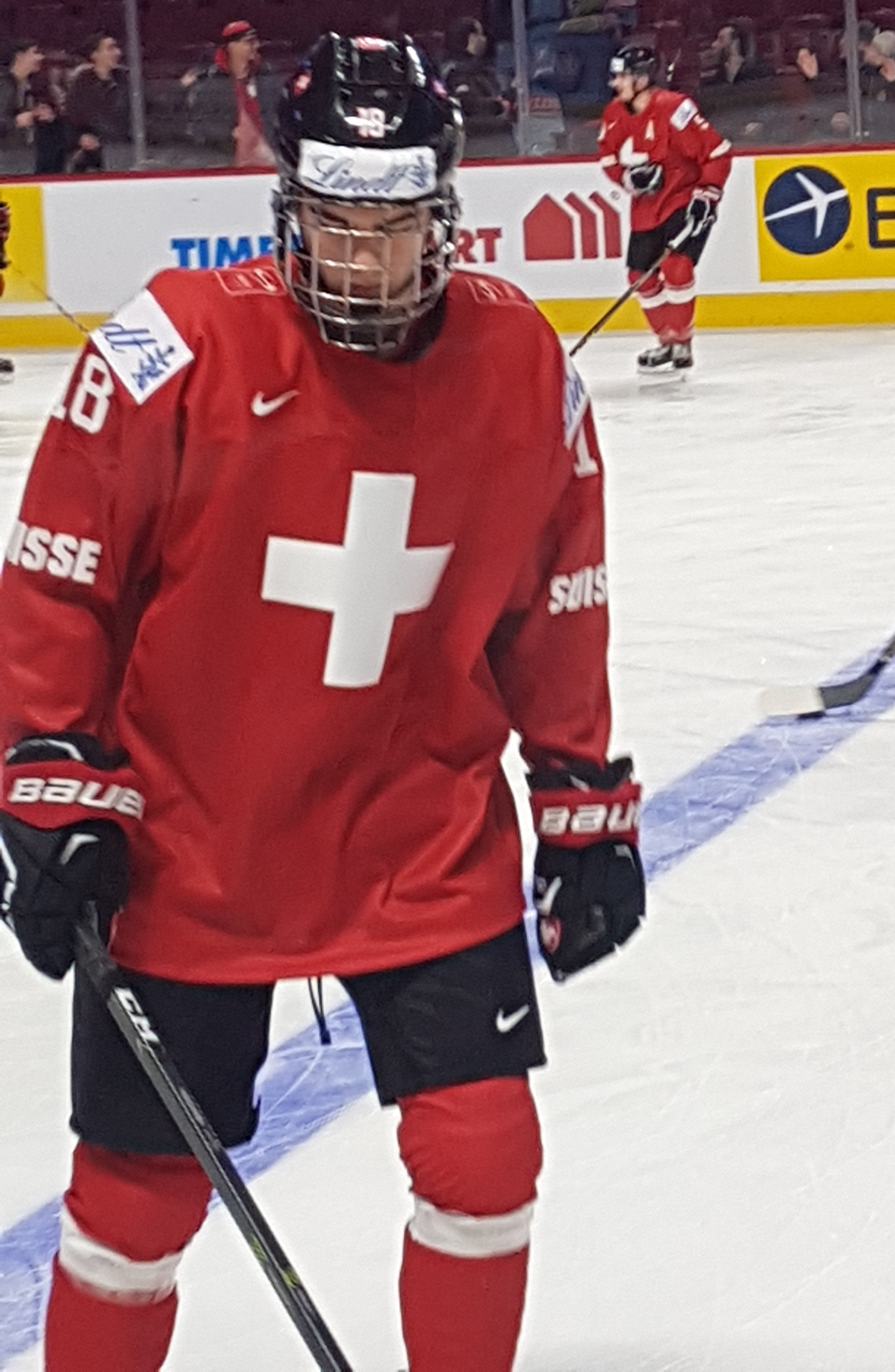
Swiss players Nino Niederreiter (white jersey) and Nico Hischier (red jersey)

Graf served as the international youth hockey supervisor for the Swiss Ice Hockey Federation (SIHF) from 2006 to 2022. He also sat on the coaching and development committee of the International Ice Hockey Federation (IIHF) for eight years, and instructed at international hockey camps.

In training players, Graf emphasized that hockey is more than a game, and it can develop life skills. He created the "Foundation, Talent, Elite, Mastery" program adopted as the SIHF mantra. He later created an "umbrella" program to foster local and regional support of players, and developed virtual training programs during the COVID-19 pandemic. In discussing foreign import players in Swiss leagues, Graf felt that they could "strengthen the structure and boost competition", but felt that limits were necessary to give Swiss players a chance to develop.

Graf created the "swissmadehockey" guidelines for training junior hockey players, which then formed the approach to training the Switzerland men's national ice hockey team, and helped develop national team players Nico Hischier and Nino Niederreiter. Graf also served as an assistant coach at the 2010 Deutschland Cup, when Switzerland finished second place, and was an assistant coach for team Switzerland in ice hockey at the 2019 Winter Universiade where they finished eighth place.

When Graf became the SIHF director of recruitment and education in 2022, his focus turned to the training of coaches. (Note: Graf was the SIHF director of recruitment and education from 2022 until 31 May 2024. Focused on the training of coaches.) He stressed that coaches needed the same level of training as players, to impart knowledge, and to gain the trust of the players. He felt that a coach's behavior as a role model, would shape the personality of players. He also sought more youth hockey coaches per player, and more assistant coaches in junior hockey to improve training quality. He also developed a club management training course, which included increasing membership, gaining sponsors, and handling legal issues.

Graf resigned as the director of recruitment and education on 31 May 2024. He subsequently served on the SIHF board of directors, but postponed retiring in September to serve as the interim chief executive officer until the position was filled. He retired at the end of October 2024, when Martin Baumann became the chief executive officer.

In 2024, he received the Johan Bollue Award from the IIHF. He was credited for his vision, communication, and IIHF programs to develop youth players.
