= Neil Nicholson (ice hockey) =

Canadian ice hockey player

- Born: September 12, 1949 (age 76) Saint John, New Brunswick, Canada
- Height: 5 ft 11 in (180 cm)
- Weight: 180 lb (82 kg; 12 st 12 lb)
- Position: Defence
- Shot: Right
- Played for: Oakland Seals; New York Islanders
- NHL draft: 65th overall, 1969; Oakland Seals
- Playing career: 1969–1987

Neil Andrew Nicholson (born September 12, 1949) is a Canadian former professional ice hockey defenceman who played in the National Hockey League for the Oakland Seals and New York Islanders.

== Career statistics ==
=== Regular season and playoffs ===
			Regular season					Playoffs
Season	Team	League	GP	G	A	Pts	PIM	GP	G	A	Pts	PIM
1966–67	Fredericton Junior Red Wings	NBJHL	—	9	11	20	39	—	—	—	—	—
1966–67	Halifax Junior Canadiens	NSJHL	—	—	—	—	—	4	0	1	1	4
1967–68	Fredericton Junior Red Wings	NBJHL	4	0	2	2	2	12	6	9	15	24
1967–68	Fredericton Red Wings	NBSHL	31	11	20	31	30	5	2	2	4	6
1968–69	London Knights	OHA	54	16	26	42	62	6	0	2	2	8
1969–70	Providence Reds	AHL	63	3	21	24	120	—	—	—	—	—
1969–70	Oakland Seals	NHL	—	—	—	—	—	2	0	0	0	0
1970–71	Providence Reds	AHL	56	8	16	24	41	10	4	1	5	6
1971–72	Providence Reds	AHL	73	18	18	36	21	5	2	2	4	4
1972–73	New York Islanders	NHL	30	3	1	4	23	—	—	—	—	—
1972–73	New Haven Nighthawks	AHL	43	7	12	19	44	—	—	—	—	—
1973–74	New York Islanders	NHL	8	0	0	0	0	—	—	—	—	—
1973–74	Fort Worth Wings	CHL	47	10	16	26	30	4	0	2	2	11
1974–75	Fort Worth Texans	CHL	74	14	47	61	99	—	—	—	—	—
1975–76	Fort Worth Texans	CHL	74	16	39	55	119	—	—	—	—	—
1976–77	Fort Worth Texans	CHL	65	6	43	49	78	6	1	5	6	9
1977–78	New York Islanders	NHL	1	0	0	0	0	—	—	—	—	—
1977–78	Fort Worth Texans	CHL	69	16	36	52	73	14	2	6	8	8
1978–79	SC Langnau	NLA	28	8	8	16	—	—	—	—	—	—
1978–79	Fort Worth Texans	CHL	19	0	13	13	6	5	2	0	2	8
1979–80	SC Langnau	NLA	27	11	9	20	—	—	—	—	—	—
1980–81	SC Langnau	NLA	38	15	15	30	—	—	—	—	—	—
1981–82	SC Langnau	NLA	31	12	18	30	—	—	—	—	—	—
1981–82	Dallas Black Hawks	CHL	10	0	0	0	2	8	0	2	2	0
1982–83	SC Langnau	NLA	38	17	12	29	—	—	—	—	—	—
1982–83	Moncton Alpines	AHL	12	0	2	2	9	—	—	—	—	—
1983–84	SC Langnau	NLA	39	13	13	26	—	—	—	—	—	—
1984–85	SC Langnau	NLA	27	6	7	13	—	—	—	—	—	—
1985–86	EHC Thun-Steffisburg	SWI-3	22	11	22	33	39	10	6	7	13	—
1986–87	EHC Thun-Steffisburg	SWI-3	22	8	4	12	26	10	1	4	5	—
NLA totals			228	82	82	164	—	—	—	—	—	—
NHL totals			39	3	1	4	23	2	0	0	0	0
