= Craig Sarner =

American ice hockey player

- Born: June 20, 1949 (age 77) Saint Paul, Minnesota, U.S.A.
- Height: 5 ft 11 in (180 cm)
- Weight: 185 lb (84 kg; 13 st 3 lb)
- Position: Right wing
- Shot: Left
- Played for: Boston Bruins; Minnesota Fighting Saints; Kölner Haie; Eisbären Berlin; HC Davos
- National team: United States
- NHL draft: Undrafted
- Playing career: 1972–1981
Medal record
Men's ice hockey
Representing United States
Olympic Games
Silver medal – second place	1972 Sapporo	Team

Craig Brian Sarner (born June 20, 1949 in Saint Paul, Minnesota) is a retired American ice hockey forward who appeared in a total of 7 National Hockey League regular season games with the Boston Bruins in 1974–75. He also played briefly for the WHA Minnesota Fighting Saints 1976 before moving to Europe where he was a top scorer in Germany and Switzerland. He retired from hockey after the 1980–81 season.

Before turning professional, Sarner played for the United States national team at the 1972 Winter Olympics. He also played at the 1972, 1976, 1979 World Championships.

== Career statistics ==
=== Regular season and playoffs ===
			Regular season					Playoffs
Season	Team	League	GP	G	A	Pts	PIM	GP	G	A	Pts	PIM
1968–69	University of Minnesota	WCHA	28	5	0	5	4	—	—	—	—	—
1969–70	University of Minnesota	WCHA	33	13	10	23	2	—	—	—	—	—
1970–71	University of Minnesota	WCHA	29	12	19	31	17	—	—	—	—	—
1971–72	Oklahoma City Blazers	CHL	5	1	0	1	0	—	—	—	—	—
1971–72	United States National Team	Intl	53	27	34	61	21	—	—	—	—	—
1972–73	Boston Braves	AHL	74	27	27	54	16	5	2	3	5	2
1973–74	Boston Braves	AHL	66	15	26	41	18	—	—	—	—	—
1974–75	Boston Bruins	NHL	7	0	0	0	0	—	—	—	—	—
1974–75	Rochester Americans	AHL	47	14	13	27	26	12	4	3	7	4
1975–76	Minnesota Fighting Saints	WHA	1	0	0	0	0	—	—	—	—	—
1976–77	Kölner EC	GER	41	35	26	61	100	—	—	—	—	—
1977–78	Kölner EC	GER	46	49	42	91	—	—	—	—	—	—
1978–79	Berliner SC	GER	46	52	64	116	68	—	—	—	—	—
1979–80	HC Davos	NLA	28	19	15	34	—	—	—	—	—	—
1980–81	HC Davos	NLA	36	16	14	30	—	—	—	—	—	—
1981–82	HC Davos	NLA	—	—	—	—	—	—	—	—	—	—
WHA totals			1	0	0	0	0	—	—	—	—	—
NHL totals			7	0	0	0	0	—	—	—	—	—

=== International ===
Year	Team	Event	GP	G	A	Pts	PIM
1972	United States	OLY	6	4	6	10	0
1972	United States	WC-B	6	4	4	8	—
1976	United States	WC	10	2	1	3	13
1979	United States	WC	8	1	1	2	4
Senior totals			30	11	12	23	17
