= 2009 Basel Summer Ice Hockey =

2009 Basel Summer Ice Hockey Basel, Switzerland
Tournament details
- Host country: Switzerland
- Venue(s): St. Jakob Arena (in 1 host city)
- Dates: 19–22 August 2009
- Teams: 6

Final positions
- Champions: (Russia) SKA Saint Petersburg
- Runner-up: (Switzerland) Genève-Servette HC
- Third place: (Belarus) Dinamo Minsk
- Fourth place: (Czech Republic) Bílí Tygři Liberec

Tournament statistics
- Games played: 9
- Goals scored: 45 (5 per game)

The 2009 Basel Summer Ice Hockey is an ice hockey tournament that was held in Basel, Switzerland for the first time between 19 and 22 August 2009. All matches were played at host EHC Basel's home St. Jakob Arena. Six teams, split into two groups of three, took part.

== Teams participating ==
The list of teams that were confirmed for the tournament are as listed:

- (Switzerland) EHC Basel Sharks (host)
- (Switzerland) Genève-Servette HC
- (Switzerland) HC Davos
- (Belarus) Dinamo Minsk
- (Czech Republic) Bílí Tygři Liberec
- (Russia) SKA Saint Petersburg

== Group stage ==
=== Key ===
- W (regulation win) – 3 pts.
- OTW (overtime/shootout win) – 2 pts.
- OTL (overtime/shootout loss) – 1 pt.
- L (regulation loss) – 0 pts.

=== Group A ===
Team	Pld	W	OTW	OTL	L	GF	GA	GD	Pts	Qualification
(Switzerland) Genève-Servette HC	2	2	0	0	0	7	4	+3	6	Clinched group
(Belarus) Dinamo Minsk	2	1	0	0	1	7	5	+2	3	
(Switzerland) EHC Basel Sharks	2	0	0	0	2	2	7	−5	0	

All times are local (UTC+2).

19 August 2009; 17:00	EHC Basel Sharks (Switzerland)	1–4 (0–2, 1–1, 0–0)	(Switzerland) Genève-Servette HC	St. Jakob Arena

Game reference

20 August 2009; 20:30	Genève-Servette HC (Switzerland)	4–3 (0–1, 2–2, 2–0)	(Belarus) Dinamo Minsk	St. Jakob Arena

Game reference

21 August 2009; 20:30	Dinamo Minsk (Belarus)	4–1 (1–0, 2–1, 1–0)	(Switzerland) EHC Basel Sharks	St. Jakob Arena

Game reference

=== Group B ===
Team	Pld	W	OTW	OTL	L	GF	GA	GD	Pts	Qualification
(Russia) SKA Saint Petersburg	2	2	0	0	0	6	4	+2	6	Clinched group
(Czech Republic) Bílí Tygři Liberec	2	1	0	0	1	3	3	0	3	
(Switzerland) HC Davos	2	0	0	0	2	6	8	−2	0	

All times are local (UTC+2).

19 August 2009; 20:30	HC Davos (Switzerland)	2–3 (1–1, 1–2, 0–0)	(Czech Republic) Bílí Tygři Liberec	St. Jakob Arena

Game reference

20 August 2009; 20:30	SKA Saint Petersburg (Russia)	5–4 (1–1, 3–2, 1–1)	(Switzerland) HC Davos	St. Jakob Arena

Game reference

21 August 2009; 17:00	Bílí Tygři Liberec (Czech Republic)	0–1 (0–0, 0–0, 0–1)	(Russia) SKA Saint Petersburg	St. Jakob Arena

Game reference

== Placement stage ==
=== Fifth-place Match ===
All times are local (UTC+2).

22 August 2009; 13:30	HC Davos (Switzerland)	6–2 (1–1, 5–0, 0–1)	(Switzerland) EHC Basel Sharks	St. Jakob Arena

Game reference

=== Third-place Match ===
All times are local (UTC+2).

22 August 2009; 17:00	Dinamo Minsk (Belarus)	2–1 (1–0, 1–0, 0–1)	(Czech Republic) Bílí Tygři Liberec	St. Jakob Arena

Game reference

=== Final ===
All times are local (UTC+2).

22 August 2009; 20:30	Genève-Servette HC (Switzerland)	1–2 (OT) (0–0, 1–0, 0–1, 0–1)	(Russia) SKA Saint Petersburg	St. Jakob Arena

Game reference

== Champions ==
2009 Basel Summer Ice Hockey winners

SKA Saint Petersburg
