= 2010 Basel Summer Ice Hockey =

2010 Basel Summer Ice Hockey Basel, Switzerland
Tournament details
- Host country: Switzerland
- Venue(s): St. Jakob Arena (in 1 host city)
- Dates: 18–22 August 2010
- Teams: 6

Final positions
- Champions: (Slovakia) HC Slovan Bratislava
- Runner-up: (Russia) SKA Saint Petersburg
- Third place: (Kazakhstan) Barys Astana
- Fourth place: (Switzerland) Genève-Servette HC

Tournament statistics
- Games played: 11
- Goals scored: 77 (7 per game)

The 2010 Basel Summer Ice Hockey is an ice hockey tournament that was held in Basel, Switzerland between 18 and 22 August 2010. All matches were played at host EHC Basel's home St. Jakob Arena. Six teams, split into two groups of three, once again took part.

== Teams participating ==
The list of teams that were confirmed for the tournament are as listed:

- (Switzerland) EHC Basel Sharks (host)
- (Kazakhstan) Barys Astana
- (Switzerland) Genève-Servette HC
- (Czech Republic) HC Eaton Pardubice
- (Slovakia) HC Slovan Bratislava
- (Russia) SKA Saint Petersburg

== Group stage ==
=== Key ===
- W (regulation win) – 3 pts.
- OTW (overtime/shootout win) – 2 pts.
- OTL (overtime/shootout loss) – 1 pt.
- L (regulation loss) – 0 pts.

=== Group A ===
Team	Pld	W	OTW	OTL	L	GF	GA	GD	Pts	Qualification
(Kazakhstan) Barys Astana	2	1	0	1	0	11	5	+6	4	Clinched group
(Slovakia) HC Slovan Bratislava	2	0	1	1	0	5	5	0	3	Semifinal berth
(Switzerland) EHC Basel Sharks	2	0	1	0	1	3	9	−6	2	

All times are local (UTC+1).

18 August 2010; 17:00	EHC Basel Sharks (Switzerland)	1–8 (1 – 1, 0 – 3, 0 – 4)	(Kazakhstan) Barys Astana	St. Jakob Arena

Game reference

19 August 2010; 20:30	Barys Astana (Kazakhstan)	3–4 (SO) (2 – 0, 0 – 1, 1 – 2, 0 – 0, 0 – 1)	(Slovakia) HC Slovan Bratislava	St. Jakob Arena

Game reference

20 August 2010; 20:30	HC Slovan Bratislava (Slovakia)	1–2 (SO) (1 – 0, 0 – 0, 0 – 1, 0 – 0, 0 – 1)	(Switzerland) EHC Basel Sharks	St. Jakob Arena

Game reference

=== Group B ===
Team	Pld	W	OTW	OTL	L	GF	GA	GD	Pts	Qualification
(Switzerland) Genève-Servette HC	2	2	0	0	0	11	5	+6	6	Clinched group
(Russia) SKA Saint Petersburg	2	1	0	0	1	5	5	0	3	Semifinal berth
(Czech Republic) HC Eaton Pardubice	2	0	0	0	2	6	12	−6	0	

All times are local (UTC+1).

18 August 2010; 20:30	HC Eaton Pardubice (Czech Republic)	2–5 (1 – 1, 1 – 0, 0 – 4)	(Russia) SKA Saint Petersburg	St. Jakob Arena

Game reference

19 August 2010; 20:30	Genève-Servette HC (Switzerland)	7–4 (0 – 1, 3 – 0, 4 – 3)	(Czech Republic) HC Eaton Pardubice	St. Jakob Arena

Game reference

20 August 2010; 17:00	SKA Saint Petersburg (Russia)	1–4 (0 – 0, 0 – 3, 1 – 1)	(Switzerland) Genève-Servette HC	St. Jakob Arena

Game reference

== Knockout stage ==
Semifinals
A1	(Kazakhstan) Barys Astana	1
B2	(Russia) SKA Saint Petersburg	6
B1	(Switzerland) Genève-Servette HC	5
A2	(Slovakia) HC Slovan Bratislava	6

Final
SF1	(Russia) SKA Saint Petersburg	2
SF2	(Slovakia) HC Slovan Bratislava	4
Third place playoff
SF1	(Kazakhstan) Barys Astana	4*
SF2	(Switzerland) Genève-Servette HC	3

Key: * – final in overtime. ** – final in shootout.

=== Fifth-place Match ===
All times are local (UTC+1).

21 August 2010; 12:30	EHC Basel Sharks (Switzerland)	0–5 (0 – 0, 0 – 1, 0 – 4)	(Czech Republic) HC Eaton Pardubice	St. Jakob Arena

Game reference

=== Semifinals ===
All times are local (UTC+1).

21 August 2010; 16:00	Barys Astana (Kazakhstan)	1–6 (1 – 2, 0 – 2, 0 – 2)	(Russia) SKA Saint Petersburg	St. Jakob Arena

Game reference

21 August 2010; 19:30	Genève-Servette HC (Switzerland)	5–6 (2 – 1, 1 – 3, 2 – 2)	(Slovakia) HC Slovan Bratislava	St. Jakob Arena

Game reference

=== Third-place Match ===
All times are local (UTC+1).

22 August 2010; 15:30	Barys Astana (Kazakhstan)	4–3 (OT) (0 – 1, 2 – 1, 1 – 1, 1 – 0)	(Switzerland) Genève-Servette HC	St. Jakob Arena

Game reference

=== Final ===
All times are local (UTC+1).

22 August 2010; 19:00	SKA Saint Petersburg (Russia)	2–4 (2 – 1, 0 – 2, 0 – 1)	(Slovakia) HC Slovan Bratislava	St. Jakob Arena

Game reference

== Champions ==
2010 Basel Summer Ice Hockey winners

HC Slovan Bratislava
