= 1950–51 Nationalliga A season =

Swiss professional ice hockey season

The 1950–51 Nationalliga A season was the 13th season of the Nationalliga A, the top level of ice hockey in Switzerland. Eight teams participated in the league, and EHC Arosa won the championship.

== First round ==
=== Group 1 ===
Pl.	Team	GP	W	T	L	GF–GA	Pts.
1.	Zürcher SC	6	5	1	0	31:11	11
2.	EHC Basel-Rotweiss	6	1	3	2	23:27	5
3.	SC Bern	6	2	1	3	23:29	5
4.	HC Davos	6	0	3	3	23:33	3

=== Group 2 ===
Pl.	Team	GP	W	T	L	GF–GA	Pts.
1.	EHC Arosa	6	5	1	0	68:17	11
2.	Lausanne HC	6	4	1	1	38:22	9
3.	Grasshopper Club	6	1	0	5	22:55	2
4.	Young Sprinters Neuchâtel	6	1	0	5	19:53	2

== Final round ==
Pl.	Team	GP	W	T	L	GF–GA	Pts.
1.	EHC Arosa	6	4	1	1	39:21	9
2.	Lausanne HC	6	3	2	1	35:27	8
3.	Zürcher SC	6	2	2	2	21:23	6
4.	EHC Basel-Rotweiss	6	0	1	5	16:40	1

== 5th-8th place ==
Pl.	Team	GP	W	T	L	GF–GA	Pts.
5.	HC Davos	6	4	1	1	42:26	9
6.	SC Bern	6	3	1	2	35:34	7
7.	Grasshopper Club	6	3	0	3	36:31	6
8.	Young Sprinters Neuchâtel	6	1	0	5	29:51	2

== Relegation ==
- Young Sprinters Neuchâtel - HC La Chaux-de-Fonds 8:7
