= 1959–60 Nationalliga A season =

Swiss professional ice hockey season

The 1959–60 Nationalliga A season was the 22nd season of the Nationalliga A, the top level of ice hockey in Switzerland. Eight teams participated in the league, and HC Davos won the championship.

== Regular season ==
Pl.	Team	GP	W	T	L	GF–GA	Pts.
1.	HC Davos	14	10	0	4	80:46	20
2.	Zürcher SC	14	9	1	4	76:45	19
3.	SC Bern	14	7	2	5	60:46	16
4.	Young Sprinters Neuchâtel	14	7	0	7	67:57	14
5.	EHC Basel-Rotweiss	14	7	0	7	62:65	14
6.	Lausanne HC	14	6	1	7	69:83	13
7.	HC Ambrì-Piotta	14	6	0	8	56:75	12
8.	EHC Arosa	14	2	0	12	52:105	4

== Relegation ==
- EHC Arosa - EHC Visp 4:6
