= 1956–57 Nationalliga A season =

Swiss professional ice hockey season

The 1956–57 Nationalliga A season was the 19th season of the Nationalliga A, the top level of ice hockey in Switzerland. Eight teams participated in the league, and EHC Arosa won the championship.

== Regular season ==
Pl.	Team	GP	W	T	L	GF–GA	Pts.
1.	EHC Arosa	14	12	1	1	84:42	25
2.	HC Davos	14	12	0	2	106:41	24
3.	HC Ambrì-Piotta	14	6	3	5	70:60	15
4.	Young Sprinters Neuchâtel	14	5	3	6	63:47	13
5.	Zürcher SC	14	5	3	6	50:60	13
6.	EHC Basel-Rotweiss	14	5	1	8	52:81	11
7.	HC La Chaux-de-Fonds	14	3	3	8	67:91	9
8.	Grasshopper Club	14	0	2	12	29:99	2

== Relegation ==
- Grasshopper Club - Lausanne HC 3:11
