= 1944–45 Nationalliga A season =

Swiss professional ice hockey season

The 1944–45 Nationalliga A season was the seventh season of the Nationalliga A, the top level of ice hockey in Switzerland. Seven teams participated in the league, and HC Davos won the championship.

== Regular season ==
Pl.	Team	GP	W	T	L	GF–GA	Pts.
1.	HC Davos	6	6	0	0	44:5	12
2.	Zürcher SC	6	4	1	1	36:9	9
3.	Montchoisi Lausanne	6	4	1	1	16:13	9
4.	EHC Arosa	6	3	0	3	21:19	6
5.	SC Bern	6	1	1	4	7:34	3
6.	EHC Basel-Rotweiss	6	0	2	4	5:24	2
7.	Grasshopper Club	6	0	1	5	10:35	1

== Relegation ==
- Grasshopper-Club - Young Sprinters Neuchâtel 1:7
