= 1957–58 Nationalliga A season =

Swiss professional ice hockey season

The 1957–58 Nationalliga A season was the 20th season of the Nationalliga A, the top level of ice hockey in Switzerland. Eight teams participated in the league, and HC Davos won the championship.

== Regular season ==
Pl.	Team	GP	W	T	L	GF–GA	Pts.
1.	HC Davos	14	11	1	2	86:47	23
2.	Young Sprinters Neuchâtel	14	9	1	4	87:53	19
3.	Zürcher SC	14	6	3	5	73:55	15
4.	HC Ambrì-Piotta	14	7	0	7	51:57	14
5.	EHC Arosa	14	5	1	8	47:61	11
6.	EHC Basel-Rotweiss	14	5	1	8	52:72	11
7.	Lausanne HC	14	5	0	9	60:84	10
8.	HC La Chaux-de-Fonds	14	4	1	9	54:81	9

== Relegation ==
- HC La Chaux-de-Fonds - SC Bern 4:11
