= 1947–48 Nationalliga A season =

Swiss professional ice hockey season

The 1947–48 Nationalliga A season was the 10th season of the Nationalliga A, the top level of ice hockey in Switzerland. Seven teams participated in the league, and HC Davos won the championship.

== Standings ==
Pl.	Team	GP	W	T	L	GF–GA	Pts.
1.	HC Davos	7	7	0	0	55:13	14
2.	EHC Arosa	7	6	0	1	65:40	12
3.	EHC Basel-Rotweiss	7	4	1	2	44:40	9
4.	Zürcher SC	7	4	0	3	57:35	8
5.	Young Sprinters Neuchâtel	7	2	2	3	37:50	6
6.	SC Bern	7	1	2	4	35:53	4
7.	Montchoisi Lausanne	7	1	1	5	29:53	3
8.	Grasshopper Club	7	0	0	7	26:64	0
