= 1952–53 Nationalliga A season =

Swiss professional ice hockey season

The 1952–53 Nationalliga A season was the 15th season of the Nationalliga A, the top level of ice hockey in Switzerland. Eight teams participated in the league, and EHC Arosa won the championship.

== Regular season ==
Pl.	Team	GP	W	T	L	GF–GA	Pts.
1.	EHC Arosa	14	14	0	0	98:39	28
2.	Young Sprinters Neuchâtel	14	10	0	4	69:43	20
3.	Grasshopper Club	14	7	1	6	58:54	15
4.	Zürcher SC	14	6	0	8	78:71	12
5.	HC Davos	14	5	1	8	71:76	11
6.	SC Bern	14	5	1	8	43:57	11
7.	Lausanne HC	14	3	2	9	40:85	8
8.	EHC Basel-Rotweiss	14	3	1	10	37:69	7

== Relegation ==
- EHC Basel-Rotweiss - HC Ambrì-Piotta 3:7
