= 2011 Basel Summer Ice Hockey =

2011 Basel Summer Ice Hockey Basel, Switzerland
Tournament details
- Host country: Switzerland
- Venue(s): St. Jakob Arena (in 1 host city)
- Dates: 17–21 August 2011
- Teams: 6

Final positions
- Champions: (Finland) JYP Jyväskylä
- Runner-up: (Russia) SKA Saint Petersburg
- Third place: (Switzerland) SC Bern
- Fourth place: (Switzerland) EHC Basel Sharks

Tournament statistics
- Games played: 11
- Goals scored: 69 (6.27 per game)

The 2011 Basel Summer Ice Hockey is an ice hockey tournament that was held in Basel, Switzerland between 17 and 21 August 2011. All matches were played at host EHC Basel's home St. Jakob Arena. Six teams, split into two groups of three, took part.

== Teams participating ==
The list of teams that have been confirmed for the tournament are as listed:

- (Switzerland) EHC Basel Sharks (host)
- (Kazakhstan) Barys Astana
- (Finland) JYP Jyväskylä
- (Germany) Krefeld Pinguine
- (Switzerland) SC Bern
- (Russia) SKA Saint Petersburg

== Group stage ==
=== Key ===
- W (regulation win) – 3 pts.
- OTW (overtime/shootout win) – 2 pts.
- OTL (overtime/shootout loss) – 1 pt.
- L (regulation loss) – 0 pts.

=== Group Urs-Dieter Jud ===
Team	Pld	W	OTW	OTL	L	GF	GA	GD	Pts	Qualification
(Finland) JYP Jyväskylä	2	2	0	0	0	6	3	+3	6	Clinched group
(Switzerland) SC Bern	2	1	0	0	1	5	4	+1	3	Semifinal berth
(Kazakhstan) Barys Astana	2	0	0	0	2	6	10	−4	0	

All times are local (UTC+2).

17 August 2011; 17:15	Barys Astana (Kazakhstan)	3–5	(Finland) JYP Jyväskylä	St. Jakob Arena

18 August 2011; 20:30	SC Bern (Switzerland)	5–3	(Kazakhstan) Barys Astana	St. Jakob Arena

19 August 2011; 20:30	JYP Jyväskylä (Finland)	1–0	(Switzerland) SC Bern	St. Jakob Arena

=== Group René Nebel ===
Team	Pld	W	OTW	OTL	L	GF	GA	GD	Pts	Qualification
(Russia) SKA Saint Petersburg	2	2	0	0	0	12	2	+10	6	Clinched group
(Switzerland) EHC Basel Sharks	2	1	0	0	1	5	10	−5	3	Semifinal berth
(Germany) Krefeld Pinguine	2	0	0	0	2	5	10	−5	0	

All times are local (UTC+2).

17 August 2011; 20:30	SKA Saint Petersburg (Russia)	7–0	(Switzerland) EHC Basel Sharks	St. Jakob Arena

18 August 2011; 17:15	Krefeld Pinguine (Germany)	2–5	(Russia) SKA Saint Petersburg	St. Jakob Arena

19 August 2011; 17:15	EHC Basel Sharks (Switzerland)	5–3	(Germany) Krefeld Pinguine	St. Jakob Arena

== Knockout stage ==
Semifinals
A1	(Russia) SKA Saint Petersburg	5
B2	(Switzerland) SC Bern	2
B1	(Finland) JYP Jyväskylä	4
A2	(Switzerland) EHC Basel Sharks	0

Final
SF1	(Russia) SKA Saint Petersburg	2
SF2	(Finland) JYP Jyväskylä	3*
Third place playoff
SF1	(Switzerland) EHC Basel Sharks	2
SF2	(Switzerland) SC Bern	3**

Key: * – final in overtime. ** – final in shootout.

=== Fifth-place Match ===
All times are local (UTC+2).

20 August 2011; 12:30	Krefeld Pinguine (Germany)	1–10	(Kazakhstan) Barys Astana	St. Jakob Arena

=== Semifinals ===
All times are local (UTC+2).

20 August 2011; 16:00	SKA Saint Petersburg (Russia)	5–2	(Switzerland) SC Bern	St. Jakob Arena

20 August 2011; 19:30	JYP Jyväskylä (Finland)	4–0	(Switzerland) EHC Basel Sharks	St. Jakob Arena

=== Third-place Match ===
All times are local (UTC+2).

21 August 2011; 15:30	EHC Basel Sharks (Switzerland)	2–3 (SO)	(Switzerland) SC Bern	St. Jakob Arena

=== Final ===
All times are local (UTC+2).

21 August 2011; 19:00	SKA Saint Petersburg (Russia)	2–3 (OT)	(Finland) JYP Jyväskylä	St. Jakob Arena

== Champions ==
2011 Basel Summer Ice Hockey winners

JYP Jyväskylä
