= 1958–59 Nationalliga A season =

Swiss professional ice hockey season

The 1958–59 Nationalliga A season was the 21st season of the Nationalliga A, the top level of ice hockey in Switzerland. Eight teams participated in the league, and SC Bern won the championship.

== Regular season ==
Pl.	Team	GP	W	T	L	GF–GA	Pts.
1.	SC Bern	14	11	1	2	92:63	23
2.	HC Davos	14	9	1	4	88:47	19
3.	Zürcher SC	14	8	0	6	79:67	16
4.	Young Sprinters Neuchâtel	14	7	1	6	84:67	15
5.	Lausanne HC	14	5	3	6	74:84	13
6.	EHC Basel-Rotweiss	14	4	3	7	69:92	11
7.	HC Ambrì-Piotta	14	4	1	9	52:78	9
8.	EHC Arosa	14	3	0	11	49:89	6

== Relegation ==
- EHC Arosa - HC La Chaux-de-Fonds 4:2
