= 1949–50 Nationalliga A season =

Swiss professional ice hockey season

The 1949–50 Nationalliga A season was the 12th season of the Nationalliga A, the top level of ice hockey in Switzerland. Eight teams participated in the league, and HC Davos won the championship.

== First round ==
=== Group 1 ===
| Pl. | Team | GP | W | T | L | GF–GA | Pts. |
|---|---|---|---|---|---|---|---|
| 1. | Zürcher SC | 6 | 5 | 0 | 1 | 40:18 | 10 |
| 2. | Lausanne HC | 6 | 3 | 1 | 2 | 18:11 | 7 |
| 3. | EHC Basel-Rotweiss | 6 | 3 | 0 | 3 | 18:28 | 6 |
| 4. | Young Sprinters Neuchâtel | 6 | 0 | 1 | 5 | 10:29 | 1 |

=== Group 2 ===
| Pl. | Team | GP | W | T | L | GF–GA | Pts. |
|---|---|---|---|---|---|---|---|
| 1. | EHC Arosa | 6 | 5 | 0 | 1 | 58:27 | 10 |
| 2. | HC Davos | 6 | 5 | 0 | 1 | 50:23 | 10 |
| 3. | SC Bern | 6 | 1 | 0 | 5 | 30:39 | 2 |
| 4. | Grasshopper Club | 6 | 1 | 0 | 5 | 18:67 | 2 |

== Final round ==
| Pl. | Team | GP | W | T | L | GF–GA | Pts. |
|---|---|---|---|---|---|---|---|
| 1. | HC Davos | 6 | 4 | 1 | 1 | 25:19 | 9 |
| 2. | Lausanne HC | 6 | 3 | 0 | 3 | 21:19 | 6 |
| 3. | Zürcher SC | 6 | 2 | 1 | 3 | 17:24 | 5 |
| 4. | EHC Arosa | 6 | 2 | 0 | 4 | 30:31 | 4 |

== 5th-8th place ==
| Pl. | Team | GP | W | T | L | GF–GA | Pts. |
|---|---|---|---|---|---|---|---|
| 5. | EHC Basel-Rotweiss | 6 | 4 | 1 | 1 | 35:17 | 9 |
| 6. | SC Bern | 6 | 2 | 1 | 3 | 25:25 | 5 |
| 7. | Young Sprinters Neuchâtel | 6 | 2 | 1 | 3 | 23:28 | 5 |
| 8. | Grasshopper Club | 6 | 2 | 1 | 3 | 29:42 | 5 |

== Relegation ==
- Grasshopper Club - HC Ambrì-Piotta 3:2
