= 1946–47 Nationalliga A season =

Swiss professional ice hockey season

The 1946–47 Nationalliga A season was the ninth season of the Nationalliga A, the top level of ice hockey in Switzerland. Eight teams participated in the league, and HC Davos won the championship.

== Regular season ==
=== Group 1 ===
Pl.	Team	GP	W	T	L	GF–GA	Pts.
1.	Zürcher SC	6	5	1	0	57:26	11
2.	EHC Basel-Rotweiss	6	2	2	2	33:28	6
3.	Montchoisi Lausanne	6	2	1	3	25:28	5
4.	Grasshopper-Club	6	0	2	4	28:61	2

=== Group 2 ===
Pl.	Team	GP	W	T	L	GF–GA	Pts.
1.	HC Davos	6	6	0	0	46:8	12
2.	EHC Arosa	6	3	0	3	56:43	6
3.	Young Sprinters Neuchâtel	6	3	0	3	48:62	6
4.	SC Bern	6	0	0	6	18:55	0

== Final ==
- Zürcher SC - HC Davos 1:8/2:4

== Qualification round ==
- Grasshopper-Club - SC Bern 9:8/6:11

== Relegation ==
- Grasshopper-Club - EHC Chur 5:3
