= 1945–46 Nationalliga A season =

Swiss professional ice hockey season

The 1945–46 Nationalliga A season was the eighth season of the Nationalliga A, the top level of ice hockey in Switzerland. Seven teams participated in the league, and HC Davos won the championship.

== Standings ==
Pl.	Team	GP	W	T	L	GF–GA	Pts.
1.	HC Davos	6	5	1	0	30:8	11
2.	EHC Basel-Rotweiss	6	4	1	1	20:10	9
3.	EHC Arosa	6	4	1	1	22:18	9
4.	Zürcher SC	6	3	0	3	15:16	6
5.	Young Sprinters Neuchâtel	6	2	1	3	26:29	5
6.	Montchoisi Lausanne	6	1	0	5	14:23	2
7.	SC Bern	6	0	0	6	11:34	0
