= Otto Schubiger =

Swiss ice hockey player (1925–2019)

- Born: 6 January 1925 Zürich, Switzerland
- Died: 28 January 2019 (aged 94) Baden, Switzerland
- Position: Right wing
- Played for: ZSC Lions; GCK Lions; SC Rapperswil-Jona Lakers
- National team: Switzerland
- Playing career: 1946–1959

Otto Schubiger
Medal record

Representing Switzerland

Men's ice hockey

Olympics
Bronze medal – third place	1948 St. Moritz	

World Championships
Bronze medal – third place	1953 Switzerland	
Bronze medal – third place	1951 France	

Otto Schubiger (6 January 1925 – 28 January 2019) was a Swiss ice hockey player. He played for the ZSC Lions, GCK Lions, and SC Rapperswil-Jona Lakers, winning the Swiss National League A championship in 1949 and 1961, both with ZSC. Internationally Schubiger played for the Swiss national team, winning a bronze medal at the 1948 Winter Olympics, and bronze medals at the 1951 and 1953 World Championships. He died on 28 January 2019.
