= 1955–56 Nationalliga A season =

Swiss professional ice hockey season

The 1955–56 Nationalliga A season was the 18th season of the Nationalliga A, the top level of ice hockey in Switzerland. Eight teams participated in the league, and EHC Arosa won the championship.

== Regular season ==
Pl.	Team	GP	W	T	L	GF–GA	Pts.
1.	EHC Arosa	14	10	3	1	112:54	23
2.	HC Davos	14	9	1	4	69:51	19
3.	HC La Chaux-de-Fonds	14	6	3	5	70:67	15
4.	Zürcher SC	14	6	2	6	74:73	14
5.	HC Ambrì-Piotta	14	6	1	7	68:67	13
6.	Young Sprinters Neuchâtel	14	6	0	8	59:64	12
7.	Grasshopper Club	14	4	0	10	51:90	8
8.	SC Bern	14	4	0	10	56:96	8

== Relegation ==
- SC Bern - EHC Basel-Rotweiss 9:10
