= 1951–52 Nationalliga A season =

Swiss professional ice hockey season

The 1951–52 Nationalliga A season was the 14th season of the Nationalliga A, the top level of ice hockey in Switzerland. Eight teams participated in the league, and EHC Arosa won the championship.

== First round ==
=== Group 1 ===
Pl.	Team	GP	W	T	L	GF–GA	Pts.
1.	EHC Arosa	6	6	0	0	36:18	12
2.	Zürcher SC	6	2	1	3	14:25	5
3.	HC Davos	6	1	2	3	29:27	4
4.	Grasshopper Club	6	0	3	3	20:29	3

=== Group 2 ===
Pl.	Team	GP	W	T	L	GF–GA	Pts.
1.	EHC Basel-Rotweiss	6	5	0	1	24:16	10
2.	Young Sprinters Neuchâtel	6	3	0	3	21:19	6
3.	SC Bern	6	2	0	4	16:19	4
4.	Lausanne HC	6	2	0	4	17:24	4

== Final round ==
Pl.	Team	GP	W	T	L	GF–GA	Pts.
1.	EHC Arosa	6	6	0	0	37:6	12
2.	EHC Basel-Rotweiss	6	3	0	3	24:19	6
3.	Zürcher SC	6	2	1	3	20:26	5
4.	Young Sprinters Neuchâtel	6	0	1	5	12:42	1

== 5th-8th place ==
Pl.	Team	GP	W	T	L	GF–GA	Pts.
5.	SC Bern	6	4	0	2	30:26	8
6.	Grasshopper Club	6	2	2	2	28:25	6
7.	Lausanne HC	6	2	2	2	20:21	6
8.	HC Davos	6	0	4	2	23:29	4

== Relegation ==
- HC Davos - HC La Chaux-de-Fonds 13:3
