= Basel Summer Ice Hockey =

The Basel Summer Ice Hockey is an ice hockey tournament held in Basel, Switzerland every August before the start of many domestic European ice hockey seasons. All matches are played at the home of the EHC Basel ice hockey club, that being St. Jakob Arena.

This tournament has been contested since 2009.

== Tournaments ==
Year	Final			Third place match		
Year	Champion	Score	Runner-Up	Third Place	Score	Fourth Place
2009	(Russia); SKA Saint Petersburg	2 – 1 (OT)	(Switzerland); Genève-Servette HC	(Belarus); Dinamo Minsk	2 – 1	(Czech Republic); Bílí Tygři Liberec
2010	(Slovakia); HC Slovan Bratislava	4 – 2	(Russia); SKA Saint Petersburg	(Kazakhstan); Barys Astana	4 – 3 (OT)	(Switzerland); Genève-Servette HC
2011	(Finland); JYP	3 – 2 (OT)	(Russia); SKA St. Petersburg	(Switzerland); SC Bern	3 – 2 (SO)	(Switzerland); EHC Basel Sharks
