= 1953–54 Nationalliga A season =

Swiss professional ice hockey season

The 1953–54 Nationalliga A season was the 16th season of the Nationalliga A, the top level of ice hockey in Switzerland. Eight teams participated in the league, and EHC Arosa won the championship.

== Regular season ==
Pl.	Team	GP	W	T	L	GF–GA	Pts.
1.	EHC Arosa	14	12	2	0	115:49	26
2.	Young Sprinters Neuchâtel	14	9	2	3	78:50	20
3.	SC Bern	14	7	0	7	72:56	14
4.	Grasshopper Club	14	6	2	6	77:76	14
5.	Zürcher SC	14	6	1	7	75:82	13
6.	HC Ambrì-Piotta	14	6	0	8	70:77	12
7.	HC Davos	14	5	1	8	79:91	11
8.	Lausanne HC	14	1	0	13	44:129	2

== Relegation ==
- Lausanne HC - EHC St. Moritz 4:9
