= 1942–43 Nationalliga A season =

Swiss professional ice hockey season

The 1942–43 Nationalliga A season was the fifth season of the Nationalliga A, the top level of ice hockey in Switzerland. Seven teams participated in the league, and HC Davos won the championship.

== Standings ==
Pl.	Team	GP	W	T	L	GF–GA	Pts.
1.	HC Davos	6	5	1	0	40:3	11
2.	Zürcher SC	6	5	0	1	28:9	10
3.	Montchoisi Lausanne	6	2	3	1	16:16	7
4.	EHC Arosa	6	1	3	2	9:12	5
5.	EHC Basel-Rotweiss	6	1	3	2	10:21	5
6.	SC Bern	6	1	2	3	8:30	4
7.	Grasshopper-Club	6	0	0	6	8:28	0
