= 1941–42 Nationalliga A season =

Swiss professional ice hockey season

The 1941–42 Nationalliga A season was the fourth season of the Nationalliga A, the top level of ice hockey in Switzerland. Seven teams participated in the league, and HC Davos won the championship.

== Standings ==
| Pl. | Team | GP | W | T | L | GF–GA | Pts. |
|---|---|---|---|---|---|---|---|
| 1. | HC Davos | 6 | 6 | 0 | 0 | 42:5 | 12 |
| 2. | Zürcher SC | 6 | 4 | 1 | 1 | 14:8 | 9 |
| 3. | Montchoisi Lausanne | 6 | 4 | 0 | 2 | 17:17 | 8 |
| 4. | EHC Arosa | 6 | 3 | 0 | 3 | 19:22 | 6 |
| 5. | SC Bern | 6 | 2 | 1 | 3 | 16:13 | 5 |
| 6. | EHC Basel-Rotweiss | 6 | 0 | 1 | 5 | 10:27 | 1 |
| 7. | Grasshopper Club | 6 | 0 | 1 | 5 | 5:31 | 1 |
