= 1954–55 Nationalliga A season =

Swiss professional ice hockey season

The 1954–55 Nationalliga A season was the 17th season of the Nationalliga A, the top level of ice hockey in Switzerland. Eight teams participated in the league, and EHC Arosa won the championship.

== Regular season ==
Pl.	Team	GP	W	T	L	GF–GA	Pts.
1.	EHC Arosa	14	11	0	3	110:72	22
2.	Grasshopper Club	14	9	3	2	79:42	21
3.	Young Sprinters Neuchâtel	14	10	1	2	83:54	21
4.	HC Davos	14	8	0	6	74:54	16
5.	Zürcher SC	14	6	2	6	89:84	14
6.	HC Ambrì-Piotta	14	5	1	8	65:77	11
7.	SC Bern	14	3	1	10	87:96	7
8.	EHC St. Moritz	14	0	0	14	40:148	0

== Relegation ==
- EHC St. Moritz - HC La Chaux-de-Fonds 1:10
