= 1948–49 Nationalliga A season =

Swiss professional ice hockey season

The 1948–49 Nationalliga A season was the 11th season of the Nationalliga A, the top level of ice hockey in Switzerland. Eight teams participated in the league, and Zurcher SC won the championship.

== First round ==
=== Group 1 ===
Pl.	Team	GP	W	T	L	GF–GA	Pts.
1.	Zürcher SC	6	6	0	0	57:19	12
2.	EHC Arosa	6	3	1	2	44:36	7
3.	Young Sprinters Neuchâtel	6	2	1	3	30:39	5
4.	Grasshopper Club	6	0	0	6	18:58	0

=== Group 2 ===
Pl.	Team	GP	W	T	L	GF–GA	Pts.
1.	EHC Basel-Rotweiss	6	4	2	0	28:19	10
2.	HC Davos	6	4	1	1	33:16	9
3.	SC Bern	6	2	0	4	28:29	4
4.	Montchoisi Lausanne	6	0	1	5	16:41	1

== Final round ==
Pl.	Team	GP	W	T	L	GF–GA	Pts.
1.	Zürcher SC	6	4	1	1	39:20	9
2.	HC Davos	6	3	1	2	26:16	7
3.	EHC Basel-Rotweiss	6	1	2	3	24:35	4
4.	EHC Arosa	6	2	0	4	31:49	4

== 5th-8th place ==
Pl.	Team	GP	W	T	L	GF–GA	Pts.
5.	Young Sprinters Neuchâtel	6	5	0	1	44:27	10
6.	SC Bern	6	4	0	2	40:32	8
7.	Montchoisi Lausanne	6	2	1	3	24:35	5
8.	Grasshopper Club	6	0	1	5	29:43	1

== Relegation ==
- Grasshopper Club - HC Ambrì-Piotta 4:3
