= 1943–44 Nationalliga A season =

Swiss professional ice hockey season

The 1943–44 Nationalliga A season was the sixth season of the Nationalliga A, the top level of ice hockey in Switzerland. Seven teams participated in the league, and HC Davos won the championship.

== Standings ==
Pl.	Team	GP	W	T	L	GF–GA	Pts.
1.	HC Davos	6	6	0	0	47:8	12
2.	Zürcher SC	6	5	0	1	44:13	10
3.	Montchoisi Lausanne	6	3	1	2	23:17	7
4.	EHC Arosa	6	3	1	2	24:31	7
5.	Grasshopper Club	6	1	1	4	14:34	3
6.	EHC Basel-Rotweiss	6	0	2	4	12:35	2
7.	SC Bern	6	0	1	5	8:34	1
