= Danny O'Shea (ice hockey) =

Canadian ice hockey player

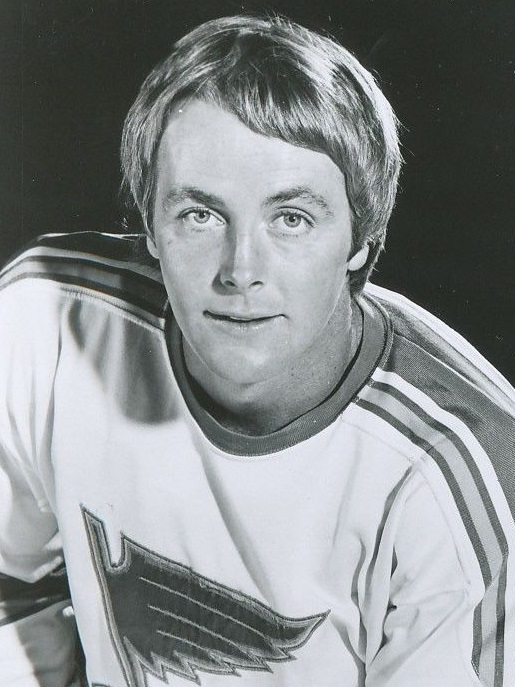
- O'Shea in 1973
- Born: June 15, 1945 (age 80) Ajax, Ontario, Canada
- Height: 6 ft 1 in (185 cm)
- Weight: 190 lb (86 kg; 13 st 8 lb)
- Position: Centre
- Shot: Left
- Played for: Minnesota North Stars; Chicago Black Hawks; St. Louis Blues; Minnesota Fighting Saints
- National team: Canada
- Playing career: 1966–1975

Olympic medal record

Men's Ice hockey
Bronze medal – third place	1968 Grenoble	Ice hockey

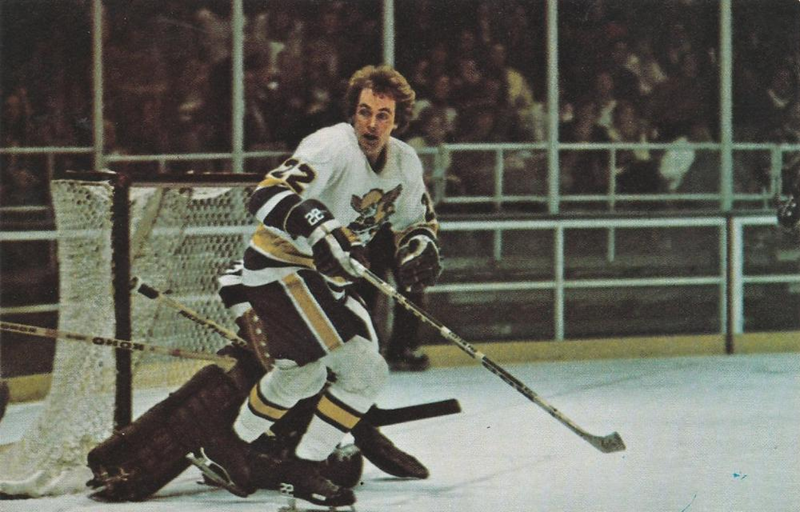
1974 photo of O'Shea in action for Minnesota Fighting Saints

Daniel Patrick O'Shea (born June 15, 1945) is a Canadian former professional ice hockey centre. He played in the National Hockey League with the Minnesota North Stars, Chicago Black Hawks, and St. Louis Blues from 1968 to 1973, and then in the World Hockey Association with the Minnesota Fighting Saints during the 1974–75 season. Prior to turning professional O'Shea played with the Canadian national team at the 1968 Winter Olympics, where he won a bronze medal. His brother, Kevin, also played in the NHL.

== Career statistics ==
=== Regular season and playoffs ===
			Regular season					Playoffs
Season	Team	League	GP	G	A	Pts	PIM	GP	G	A	Pts	PIM
1961–62	Peterborough Petes	OHA	47	5	4	9	21	—	—	—	—	—
1962–63	Peterborough Petes	OHA	30	7	7	14	16	—	—	—	—	—
1963–64	Oshawa Generals	OHA	55	30	49	79	92	6	6	3	9	16
1964–65	Oshawa Generals	OHA	24	16	19	35	60	6	0	5	5	17
1965–66	Oshawa Generals	OHA	48	36	45	81	132	17	15	18	33	47
1965–66	Oshawa Generals	M-Cup	—	—	—	—	—	12	11	14	25	20
1966–67	Canadian National Team	Intl	—	—	—	—	—	—	—	—	—	—
1967–68	Winnipeg Nationals	WCSHL	—	7	5	12	27	—	—	—	—	—
1968–69	Minnesota North Stars	NHL	74	15	34	49	88	—	—	—	—	—
1969–70	Minnesota North Stars	NHL	75	10	24	34	82	6	1	0	1	8
1970–71	Minnesota North Stars	NHL	59	14	12	26	16	—	—	—	—	—
1970–71	Chicago Black Hawks	NHL	18	4	7	11	10	18	2	5	7	15
1971–72	Chicago Black Hawks	NHL	48	6	9	15	28	—	—	—	—	—
1971–72	St. Louis Blues	NHL	20	3	3	6	11	10	0	2	2	36
1972–73	St. Louis Blues	NHL	76	12	26	38	30	5	0	0	0	2
1974–75	Minnesota Fighting Saints	WHA	76	16	25	41	47	11	0	0	0	6
1975–76	HC La Chaux–de–Fonds	NDA	—	—	—	—	—	—	—	—	—	—
WHA totals			76	16	25	41	47	11	0	0	0	0
NHL totals			370	64	115	179	265	39	3	7	10	61

=== International ===
Year	Team	Event	GP	G	A	Pts	PIM
1968	Canada	OLY	7	3	3	6	10
Senior totals			7	3	3	6	10
