= 1961–62 Nationalliga A season =

Swiss professional ice hockey season

The 1961–62 Nationalliga A season was the 24th season of the Nationalliga A, the top level of ice hockey in Switzerland. Eight teams participated in the league, and EHC Visp won the championship.

== Regular season ==
Pl.	Team	GP	W	T	L	GF–GA	Pts.
1.	EHC Visp	14	11	1	2	62:40	23
2.	SC Bern	14	10	0	4	82:44	20
3.	Zürcher SC	14	8	1	5	79:72	17
4.	HC Ambrì-Piotta	14	7	0	7	63:74	14
5.	SC Langnau	14	6	1	7	71:87	13
6.	Young Sprinters Neuchâtel	14	6	1	7	44:51	13
7.	HC Davos	14	5	0	9	36:50	10
8.	EHC Basel-Rotweiss	14	1	0	13	26:149	5

== Relegation ==
- EHC Basel-Rotweiss - HC Villars
