= 1962–63 Nationalliga A season =

Swiss professional ice hockey season

The 1962–63 Nationalliga A season was the 25th season of the Nationalliga A, the top level of ice hockey in Switzerland. 10 teams participated in the league, and HC Villars won the championship.

== Regular season ==
Pl.	Team	GP	W	T	L	GF–GA	Pts.
1.	HC Villars	18	14	1	3	75:29	29
2.	EHC Visp	18	12	2	4	73:44	26
3.	SC Bern	18	11	3	4	91:44	25
4.	Young Sprinters Neuchâtel	18	11	2	5	88:51	24
5.	HC Davos	18	11	0	7	60:50	22
6.	Zürcher SC	18	9	0	9	87:72	18
7.	EHC Kloten	18	7	0	11	74:83	14
8.	HC Ambrì-Piotta	18	6	1	11	56:74	13
9.	SC Langnau	18	4	1	13	47:87	9
10.	EHC Basel-Rotweiss	18	0	0	18	32:149	0

== Relegation ==
- EHC Basel-Rotweiss - Grasshopper Club 0:7/2:5
