= 1938–39 Nationalliga A season =

Swiss professional ice hockey season

The 1938–39 Nationalliga A season was the second season of the Nationalliga A, the top level of ice hockey in Switzerland. Six teams participated in the league, and HC Davos won the championship.

== Standings ==
Pl.	Team	GP	W	T	L	GF–GA	Pts.
1.	HC Davos	5	5	0	0	26:3	10
2.	Zürcher SC	5	4	0	1	15:2	8
3.	Grasshopper Club	5	2	0	3	10:14	4
4.	SC Bern	5	1	1	3	8:15	3
5.	EHC Arosa	5	1	1	3	4:21	3
6.	EHC St. Moritz	5	0	2	3	4:12	2
