= 1966–67 Nationalliga A season =

Swiss professional ice hockey season

The 1966–67 Nationalliga A season was the 29th season of the Nationalliga A, the top level of ice hockey in Switzerland. 10 teams participated in the league, and EHC Kloten won the championship.

== First round ==
Pl.	Team	GP	W	T	L	GF–GA	Pts
1.	HC Servette Genève	18	13	1	4	106:49	27
2.	EHC Visp	18	11	2	5	73:62	24
3.	HC La Chaux-de-Fonds	18	10	3	5	73:44	23
4.	EHC Kloten	18	10	2	6	79:54	22
5.	SC Langnau	18	8	4	6	75:65	20
6.	HC Davos	18	10	0	8	71:63	20
7.	Zürcher SC	18	8	4	6	71:82	20
8.	Grasshopper-Club	18	5	3	10	57:67	13
9.	SC Bern	18	3	1	14	32:72	7
10.	Young Sprinters Neuchâtel	18	2	0	16	44:123	4

== Final round ==
Pl.	Team	GP	W	T	L	GF–GA	Pts
1.	EHC Kloten	6	4	1	1	30:19	9
2.	HC Servette Genève	6	3	1	2	22:16	7
3.	HC La Chaux-de-Fonds	6	2	2	2	18:16	6
4.	SC Langnau	6	2	2	2	18:16	6
5.	HC Davos	6	2	1	3	29:25	5
6.	Zürcher SC	6	2	1	3	21:38	5
7.	EHC Visp	6	1	2	3	13:21	4

== Relegation ==
Pl.	Team	GP	W	T	L	GF–GA	Pts
1.	Grasshopper-Club	6	5	0	1	27:16	10
2.	HC Sierre	6	4	1	1	29:18	9
3.	Young Sprinters Neuchâtel	5	3	1	1	26:17	7
4.	HC Ambrì-Piotta	5	3	0	2	25:17	6
5.	HC Sion	6	3	0	3	26:33	6
6.	SC Bern	6	1	0	5	16:24	2
7.	SC Küsnacht	6	0	0	6	13:37	0
