= 1940–41 Nationalliga A season =

Swiss professional ice hockey season

The 1940–41 Nationalliga A season was the third season of the Nationalliga A, the top level of ice hockey in Switzerland. Five teams participated in the league, and HC Davos won the championship

== Standings ==
Pl.	Team	GP	W	T	L	GF–GA	Pts.
1.	HC Davos	4	4	0	0	23:4	8
2.	Zürcher SC	4	3	0	1	15:2	6
3.	SC Bern	4	1	1	2	1:6	3
4.	Grasshopper Club	4	1	0	3	8:20	2
5.	Montchoisi Lausanne	4	0	1	3	3:18	1
