= 1967–68 Nationalliga A season =

Swiss professional ice hockey season

The 1967–68 Nationalliga A season was the 30th season of the Nationalliga A, the top level of ice hockey in Switzerland. Eight teams participated in the league, and HC La Chaux-de-Fonds won the championship.

== Standings ==
Pl.	Team	GP	W	T	L	GF–GA	Pts
1.	HC La Chaux-de-Fonds	28	22	2	4	147:67	46
2.	HC Servette Genève	28	17	5	6	130:97	39
3.	EHC Kloten	28	14	6	8	130:96	34
4.	EHC Visp	28	10	6	12	77:93	26
5.	SC Langnau	28	9	6	13	80:85	24
6.	HC Davos	28	11	1	16	93:111	23
7.	Zürcher SC	28	8	1	19	74:147	17
8.	Grasshopper-Club	28	6	3	19	78:113	15
