= 1960–61 Nationalliga A season =

Swiss professional ice hockey season

The 1960–61 Nationalliga A season was the 23rd season of the Nationalliga A, the top level of ice hockey in Switzerland. Eight teams participated in the league, and Zurcher SC won the championship.

== Regular season ==
Pl.	Team	GP	W	T	L	GF–GA	Pts.
1.	Zürcher SC	14	11	1	2	73:41	23
2.	EHC Visp	14	7	5	2	63:44	19
3.	Young Sprinters Neuchâtel	14	8	2	4	63:45	18
4.	SC Bern	14	7	2	5	45:39	16
5.	HC Davos	14	6	3	5	49:42	15
6.	EHC Basel-Rotweiss	14	5	0	9	48:62	10
7.	HC Ambrì-Piotta	14	2	2	10	40:55	6
8.	Lausanne HC	14	2	1	11	38:91	5

== Relegation ==
- Lausanne HC - SC Langnau 2:4/3:8'
