= 1964–65 Nationalliga A season =

Swiss ice hockey season

The 1964–65 Nationalliga A season was the 27th season of the Nationalliga A, the top level of ice hockey in Switzerland. 10 teams participated in the league, and SC Bern won the championship.

== Standings ==
Pl.	Team	GP	W	T	L	GF–GA	Pts.
1.	SC Bern	18	14	3	1	95:49	31
2.	HC Villars	18	13	1	4	82:32	27
3.	SC Langnau	18	11	1	6	75:55	23
4.	EHC Kloten	18	11	0	7	85:91	22
5.	HC Servette Genève	18	9	1	8	92:72	19
6.	Grasshopper Club	18	7	3	8	71:63	17
7.	EHC Visp	18	7	1	10	71:90	15
8.	HC Davos	18	5	2	11	58:87	12
9.	Zürcher SC	18	5	1	12	80:90	11
10.	Young Sprinters Neuchâtel	18	1	1	16	57:137	3
