= 1963–64 Nationalliga A season =

Swiss professional ice hockey season

The 1963–64 Nationalliga A season was the 26th season of the Nationalliga A, the top level of ice hockey in Switzerland. 10 teams participated in the league, and HC Villars won the championship.

== Standings ==
Pl.	Team	GP	W	T	L	GF–GA	Pts.
1.	HC Villars	18	14	3	1	83:35	31
2.	EHC Visp	18	13	1	4	78:46	27
3.	SC Bern	18	12	1	5	83:49	25
4.	Grasshopper Club	18	11	3	4	69:54	25
5.	Zürcher SC	18	7	1	10	86:91	15
6.	EHC Kloten	18	7	1	10	55:71	15
7.	Young Sprinters Neuchâtel	18	7	0	11	62:86	14
8.	SC Langnau	18	4	2	12	47:72	10
9.	HC Davos	18	3	4	11	47:79	10
10.	HC Ambrì-Piotta	18	3	2	13	59:86	8
