= 1937–38 Nationalliga A season =

Swiss professional ice hockey season

The 1937–38 Nationalliga A season was the first season of the Nationalliga A. It replaced the Swiss National Championship Serie A as the top level of ice hockey in Switzerland. Six teams participated in the league, and HC Davos won the championship.

== Standings ==
Pl.	Team	GP	W	T	L	GF–GA	Pts.
1.	HC Davos	5	4	1	0	20:1	9
2.	Zürcher SC	5	4	0	1	15:3	8
3.	EHC St. Moritz	5	2	2	1	8:5	6
4.	SC Bern	5	2	0	3	8:6	4
5.	Grasshopper Club Zurich	5	1	1	3	3:13	3
6.	NEHC Basel	5	0	0	5	3:29	0
