= 1968–69 Nationalliga A season =

Swiss professional ice hockey season

The 1968–69 Nationalliga A season was the 31st season of the Nationalliga A, the top level of ice hockey in Switzerland. 10 teams participated in the league, and HC La Chaux-de-Fonds won the championship.

== First round ==
Pl.	Team	GP	W	T	L	GF–GA	Pts
1.	HC La Chaux-de-Fonds	14	13	0	1	79:14	26
2.	HC Servette Genève	14	9	0	5	64:44	18
3.	EHC Kloten	14	8	1	5	71:48	17
4.	HC Sierre	13	7	1	5	44:48	15
5.	SC Langnau	14	7	1	6	48:41	15
6.	HC Davos	14	5	0	9	47:66	10
7.	EHC Visp	14	3	0	11	29:76	6
8.	Zürcher SC	13	1	1	11	33:78	13

== Final round ==
Pl.	Team	GP	W	T	L	GF–GA	Pts (B)
1.	HC La Chaux-de-Fonds	8	7	0	1	36:19	17(3)
2.	HC Servette Genève	8	4	0	4	31:29	10(2)
3.	EHC Kloten	8	3	1	4	28:39	8(1)
4.	SC Langnau	8	3	1	4	26:29	7(0)
5.	HC Sierre	8	2	0	6	25:30	4(0)

== Relegation ==
Pl.	Team	GP	W	T	L	GF–GA	Pts (B)
1.	Zürcher SC	4	4	0	0	24:12	8(0)
2.	EHC Visp	4	2	0	2	13:17	5(1)
3.	HC Davos	4	0	0	4	11:19	2(2)
