= 1965–66 Nationalliga A season =

Swiss professional ice hockey season

The 1965–66 Nationalliga A season was the 28th season of the Nationalliga A, the top level of ice hockey in Switzerland. 10 teams participated in the league, and Grasshopper-Club Zurich won the championship.

== First round ==
Pl.	Team	GP	W	T	L	GF–GA	Pts
1.	HC Servette Genève	18	11	4	3	83:52	26
2.	Grasshopper-Club	18	11	3	4	68:46	25
3.	EHC Visp	18	10	3	5	72:53	23
4.	Zürcher SC	18	10	2	6	74:69	22
5.	SC Langnau	18	7	4	7	57:53	18
6.	SC Bern	18	7	2	9	58:61	16
7.	EHC Kloten	18	7	2	9	69:75	16
8.	HC La Chaux-de-Fonds	18	6	2	10	63:70	14
9.	HC Davos	18	6	2	10	50:72	14
10.	HC Villars	18	1	4	13	50:93	6

== Final round ==
Pl.	Team	GP	W	T	L	GF–GA	Pts
1.	Grasshopper-Club	6	3	1	2	17:20	7
2.	HC Servette Genève	6	3	0	3	25:22	6
3.	EHC Visp	6	2	2	2	22:22	6
4.	Zürcher SC	6	1	2	3	21:21	5
