= 1969–70 Nationalliga A season =

Swiss professional ice hockey season

The 1969–70 Nationalliga A season was the 32nd season of the Nationalliga A, the top level of ice hockey in Switzerland. Eight teams participated in the league, and HC La Chaux-de-Fonds won the championship.

== First round ==
Pl.	Team	GP	W	T	L	GF–GA	Pts
1.	HC La Chaux-de-Fonds	14	11	1	2	77:32	23
2.	HC Servette Genève	14	8	3	3	65:45	19
3.	HC Sierre	14	7	3	4	57:48	17
4.	SC Langnau	13	7	0	7	68:61	14
5.	EHC Kloten	14	5	4	5	68:67	14
6.	SC Bern	14	5	1	8	51:65	11
7.	Zürcher SC	14	3	3	8	51:76	9
8.	EHC Visp	13	2	1	11	34:77	5

== Final round ==
Pl.	Team	GP	W	T	L	GF–GA	Pts (B)
1.	HC La Chaux-de-Fonds	8	8	0	0	49:15	19(3)
2.	SC Langnau	8	5	1	2	43:28	11(0)
3.	EHC Kloten	8	3	1	4	39:44	7(0)
4.	HC Servette Genève	8	2	0	6	29:41	6(2)
5.	HC Sierre	8	1	0	7	24:56	3(1)

== Relegation ==
Pl.	Team	GP	W	T	L	GF–GA	Pts (B)
1.	Zürcher SC	4	2	1	1	19:8	6(1)
2.	EHC Visp	4	2	1	1	10:17	5(0)
3.	SC Bern	4	0	2	2	6:10	4(2)
