= 1976–77 Nationalliga A season =

Swiss professional ice hockey season

The 1976–77 Nationalliga A season was the 39th season of the Nationalliga A, the top level of ice hockey in Switzerland. Eight teams participated in the league, and SC Bern won the championship.

== Standings ==
Pl.	Team	GP	W	T	L	GF–GA	Pts
1.	SC Bern	28	19	3	6	162:88	41
2.	SC Langnau	28	19	1	8	146:119	39
3.	EHC Biel	28	14	5	9	124:114	33
4.	HC La Chaux-de-Fonds	28	13	3	12	115:116	29
5.	EHC Kloten	28	10	5	13	125:142	25
6.	HC Sierre	28	10	2	16	108:143	22
7.	HC Ambrì-Piotta	28	9	1	18	113:154	19
8.	EV Zug	28	6	4	18	96:113	16
