= 1974–75 Nationalliga A season =

Swiss professional ice hockey season

The 1974–75 Nationalliga A season was the 37th season of the Nationalliga A, the top level of ice hockey in Switzerland. Eight teams participated in the league, and SC Bern won the championship.

== Standings ==
Pl.	Team	GP	W	T	L	GF–GA	Pts
1.	SC Bern	28	21	3	4	159:87	45
2.	HC La Chaux-de-Fonds	28	22	0	6	174:108	44
3.	SC Langnau	28	15	3	10	129:100	33
4.	EHC Kloten	28	13	2	13	129:122	28
5.	HC Villars	28	11	0	17	89:131	22
6.	HC Ambrì-Piotta	28	9	2	17	98:127	20
7.	HC Sierre	28	8	2	18	95:154	18
8.	HC Servette Genève	28	7	0	21	116:161	14
