= 1973–74 Nationalliga A season =

Swiss professional ice hockey season

The 1973–74 Nationalliga A season was the 36th season of the Nationalliga A, the top level of ice hockey in Switzerland. Eight teams participated in the league, and SC Bern won the championship.

== Standings ==
Pl.	Team	GP	W	T	L	GF–GA	Pts
1.	SC Bern	28	21	5	2	162:66	47
2.	HC La Chaux-de-Fonds	28	22	2	4	181:84	46
3.	HC Sierre	28	14	4	10	120:123	32
4.	HC Ambrì-Piotta	28	11	3	14	116:122	25
5.	HC Servette Genève	28	10	5	23	107:132	25
6.	SC Langnau	28	9	3	16	87:123	21
7.	EHC Kloten	28	7	4	17	97:151	18
8.	Zürcher SC	28	4	2	22	84:153	10
