= 1977–78 Nationalliga A season =

Swiss professional ice hockey season

The 1977–78 Nationalliga A season was the 40th season of the Nationalliga A, the top level of ice hockey in Switzerland. Eight teams participated in the league, and EHC Biel won the championship.

== Standings ==
Pl.	Team	GP	W	T	L	GF–GA	Pts
1.	EHC Biel	28	19	3	6	159:93	41
2.	SC Langnau	28	19	2	7	158:98	40
3.	SC Bern	28	17	4	7	162:95	38
4.	EHC Kloten	28	14	3	11	114:105	31
5.	EHC Arosa	28	11	3	14	96:98	25
6.	HC La Chaux-de-Fonds	28	10	2	16	116:138	22
7.	HC Sierre	28	8	4	16	103:162	20
8.	HC Ambrì-Piotta	28	3	1	24	87:206	7
