= St. Jakob Arena =

Arena in Basel, Switzerland

Coordinates: 47.538056°N 7.618611°E

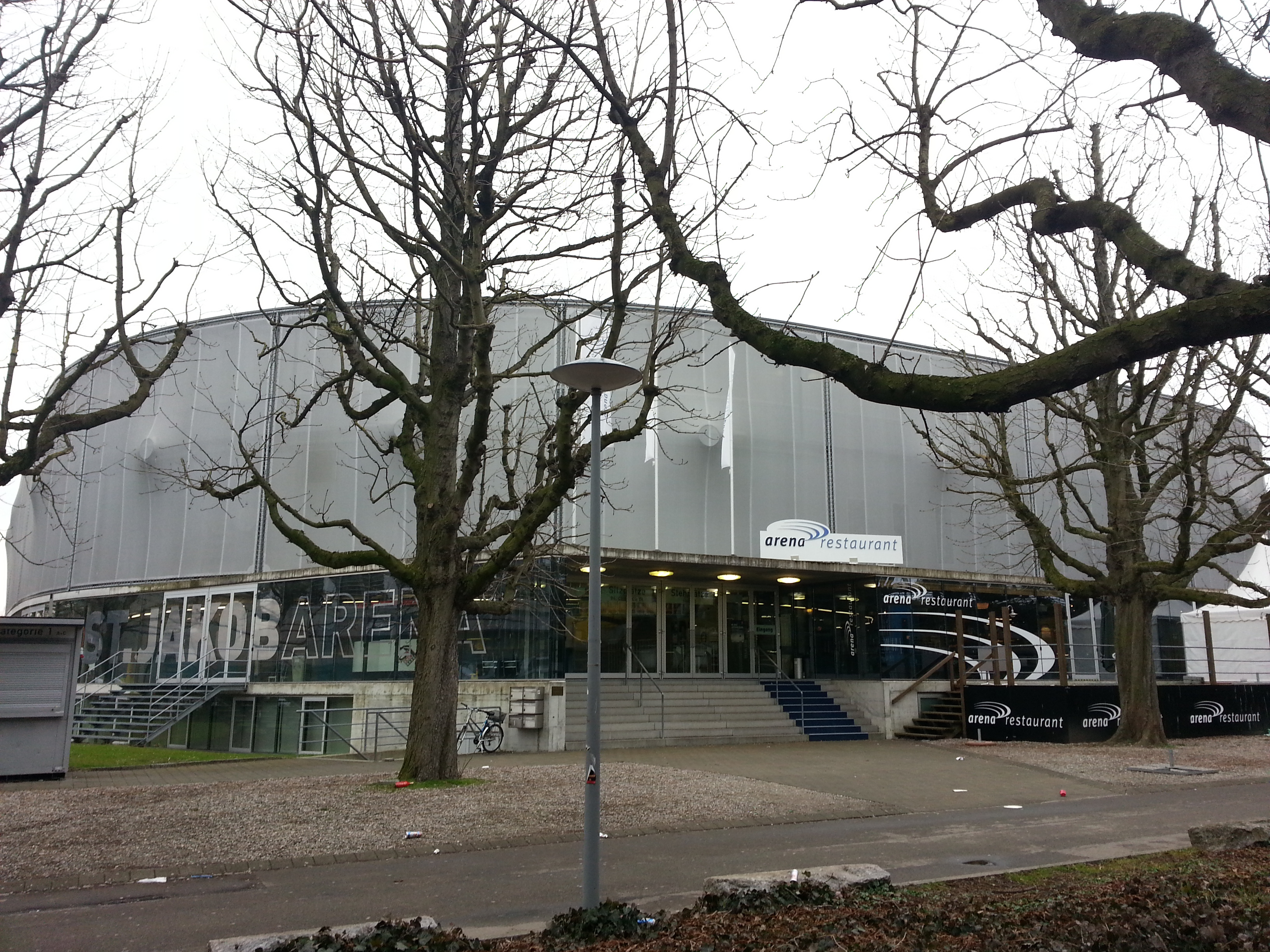
- Interactive map of St. Jakob Arena
- Location: Basel, Switzerland
- Owner: Genossenschaft Stadion St. Jakob-Park
- Operator: Basel United AG
- Capacity: 6,600

Construction
- Groundbreaking: 2001
- Opened: 12 October 2002
- Cost: CHF 25 million
- Architect: Zwipfer Partner und Berrel

Tenant
- EHC Basel (SL) (2002–present)

St. Jakob Arena is an arena in Basel, Switzerland. It is primarily used for ice hockey and is the home arena of EHC Basel. St. Jakob Arena opened in 2002 and holds 6,600 people.

== See also ==
- St. Jakob-Park
- List of indoor arenas in Switzerland
