= 1978–79 Nationalliga A season =

Swiss professional ice hockey season

The 1978–79 Nationalliga A season was the 41st season of the Nationalliga A, the top level of ice hockey in Switzerland. Eight teams participated in the league, and SC Bern won the championship.

== Standings ==
Pl.	Team	GP	W	T	L	GF–GA	Pts
1.	SC Bern	28	17	6	5	138:85	40
2.	EHC Biel	28	16	3	9	136:102	35
3.	SC Langnau	28	16	2	10	115:107	34
4.	EHC Kloten	28	14	2	12	131:106	30
5.	Lausanne HC	28	11	3	14	113:137	25
6.	EHC Arosa	28	10	4	14	100:114	24
7.	HC La Chaux-de-Fonds	28	11	2	15	102:121	24
8.	HC Sierre	28	5	2	21	85:148	12
