= 1979–80 Nationalliga A season =

Swiss professional ice hockey season

The 1979–80 Nationalliga A season was the 42nd season of the Nationalliga A, the top level of ice hockey in Switzerland. Eight teams participated in the league, and EHC Arosa won the championship.

== Standings ==
Pl.	Team	GP	W	T	L	GF–GA	Pts
1.	EHC Arosa	28	17	1	10	129:99	35
2.	SC Bern	28	15	4	9	136:118	34
3.	HC Davos	28	16	2	10	126:113	34
4.	EHC Biel	28	16	1	11	116:83	33
5.	SC Langnau	28	13	4	11	123:108	30
6.	EHC Kloten	28	11	4	13	111:105	26
7.	Lausanne HC	28	8	4	16	105:150	20
8.	HC La Chaux-de-Fonds	28	5	2	21	93:163	12
