= 1980–81 Nationalliga A season =

Swiss professional ice hockey season

The 1980–81 Nationalliga A season was the 43rd season of the Nationalliga A, the top level of ice hockey in Switzerland. Eight teams participated in the league, and EHC Biel won the championship.

== First round ==
Pl.	Team	GP	W	T	L	GF–GA	Pts
1.	EHC Biel	28	21	2	5	158:113	44
2.	EHC Arosa	28	18	2	8	144:97	38
3.	Fribourg-Gottéron	28	13	5	10	111:106	31
4.	EHC Kloten	28	13	2	13	127:113	28
5.	SC Bern	28	13	1	14	107:132	27
6.	SC Langnau	28	12	2	14	120:120	26
7.	HC Davos	28	11	1	16	98:110	23
8.	Lausanne HC	28	1	5	22	85:159	7

== Final round ==
Pl.	Team	GP	W	T	L	GF–GA	Pts
1.	EHC Biel	38	28	3	7	208:149	59
2.	EHC Arosa	38	25	2	11	212:138	52
3.	SC Langnau	38	17	3	18	163:158	37
4.	Fribourg-Gottéron	38	15	7	16	143:160	37
5.	SC Bern	38	17	2	19	147:184	36
6.	EHC Kloten	38	15	3	20	180:178	33

== Relegation ==
Pl.	Team	GP	W	T	L	GF–GA	Pts
1.	HC Davos	10	7	2	1	50:29	16
2.	Zürcher SC	10	7	1	2	44:33	15
3.	HC Ambrì-Piotta	10	5	0	5	54:50	10
4.	Lausanne HC	10	3	2	5	48:60	8
5.	HC Sierre	10	3	1	6	35:41	7
6.	EHC Olten	10	2	0	8	39:57	4
