= 1981–82 Nationalliga A season =

Swiss professional ice hockey season

The 1981–82 Nationalliga A season was the 44th season of the Nationalliga A, the top level of ice hockey in Switzerland. Eight teams participated in the league, and EHC Arosa won the championship.

== First round ==
Pl.	Team	GP	W	T	L	GF–GA	Pts
1.	EHC Arosa	28	15	6	7	133:94	36
2.	EHC Kloten	28	15	2	11	136:109	32
3.	HC Davos	28	12	6	10	110:112	30
4.	SC Langnau	28	12	5	11	122:125	29
5.	Fribourg-Gottéron	28	11	7	10	108:112	29
6.	EHC Biel	28	10	3	15	117:134	23
7.	SC Bern	28	8	7	13	96:111	23
8.	Zürcher SC	28	9	4	15	103:128	22

=== Qualification for final round ===
- SC Bern - EHC Biel 2:3

== Final round ==
Pl.	Team	GP	W	T	L	GF–GA	Pts
1.	EHC Arosa	10	8	0	2	198:127	34(18)
2.	HC Davos	10	7	0	3	159:151	29(15)
3.	EHC Kloten	10	4	1	5	174:157	25(16)
4.	SC Langnau	10	4	0	6	166:177	23(15)
5.	Fribourg-Gottéron	10	4	0	6	147:160	23(15)
6.	EHC Biel	10	2	1	7	160:195	17(12)

== Relegation ==
Pl.	Team	GP	W	T	L	GF–GA	Pts
1.	HC Lugano	10	9	1	0	63:40	19
2.	HC Ambrì-Piotta	10	7	0	3	50:43	14
3.	SC Bern	10	4	1	5	48:49	9
4.	HC Sierre	10	4	1	5	43:45	9
5.	Zürcher SC	10	2	1	7	48:62	5
6.	EHC Olten	10	2	1	7	46:59	5
