= 1975–76 Nationalliga A season =

Swiss professional ice hockey season

The 1975–76 Nationalliga A season was the 38th season of the Nationalliga A, the top level of ice hockey in Switzerland. Eight teams participated in the league, and SC Langnau won the championship.

== Standings ==
Pl.	Team	GP	W	T	L	GF–GA	Pts
1.	SC Langnau	28	18	3	7	132:85	39
2.	EHC Biel	28	18	0	10	146:118	36
3.	SC Bern	28	16	3	9	158:92	35
4.	HC La Chaux-de-Fonds	28	15	2	11	139:122	32
5.	HC Sierre	28	11	3	14	121:137	25
6.	HC Ambrì-Piotta	28	10	3	15	90:119	23
7.	EHC Kloten	28	11	1	16	110:152	23
8.	HC Villars	28	5	1	22	74:145	11
