= Young-Sprinters Hockey Club =

- City: Neuchâtel, Switzerland
- League: Regio League
- Founded: 1932
- Home arena: Patinoire du Littoral
- Colors: Red and Black
- Head coach: Mirek Hybler

The Young-Sprinters Hockey Club is a Swiss professional ice hockey team based in Neuchâtel. the team currently plays in the Regio League, the fourth tier of the highest level of ice hockey in Switzerland.
