= EHC Basel =

Swiss professional hockey team

- City: Basel, Switzerland
- League: Swiss League
- Founded: 1932
- Home arena: St. Jakob Arena
- Colors
- Head coach: Eric Himelfarb
- Website: www.ehcbasel.ch

Franchise history
- 1932–present: EHC Basel

EHC Basel are a professional Swiss ice hockey team based in Basel, Switzerland. The team currently plays in the Swiss League, the second tier of ice hockey in Switzerland. The team plays their home games at St Jakob Arena. EHC Basel was founded on 14 October 1932. Were promoted to the Nationalliga A for 2005–06 after winning the previous season. They made the playoffs and were drawn against defending champions HC Davos in the first round, losing the series 4-1. Basel finished in last place in 2006–07, but managed to avoid relegation by beating SCL Tigers in the playouts. EHC Basel has won five championships of the Nationalliga B in 1935, 1941, 1956, 2003, and 2005. Again in 2007-08 they finished bottom and were relegated to National League B (after losing in the playouts). The club has hosted a preseason tournament called Basel Summer Ice Hockey since 2009.

On 7 July 2014, the club filed a bankruptcy case for its National League B team, the EHC Basel Sharks.

== Notable players ==
- Hnat Domenichelli
- David Legwand
- Mike Maneluk
- Rob Zamuner
- Fabienne Peter, Switzerland's first transgender hockey player
