= EHC Arosa =

- City: Arosa, Switzerland
- League: MyHockey League
- Founded: 1924
- Home arena: Obersee Stadion
- Colors: Yellow, blue and white
- Head coach: Marc Haueter

EHC Arosa is a Swiss ice hockey team.

Founded: 1924
Home arena: Obersee Stadion (capacity 7,500)
Swiss Championships won: 9 (1951–1957, 1980, 1982)
Nationalliga B Championships won: 1 (1977)
