= Ice hockey in Switzerland =

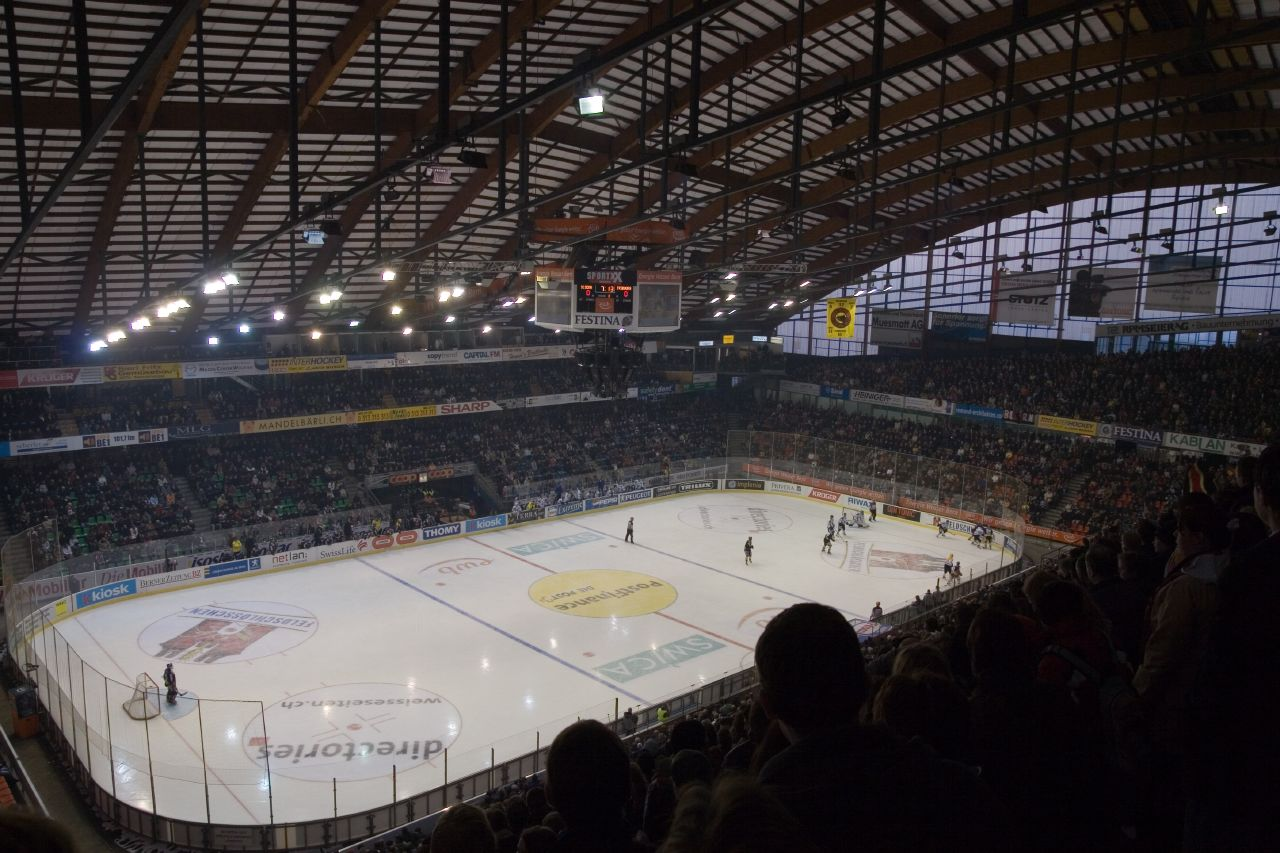
- Bern Arena in Switzerland
- Country: Switzerland
- Governing body: Swiss Ice Hockey Federation
- National teams: Men's national team; Women's national team; Men's national junior team; Men's national U18 team; Women's national U18 team
- Registered players: 30,655

National competitions
- National League; Swiss League; MySports League; Regio League

International competitions
- IIHF World Championships; Winter Olympics; Spengler Cup

Ice hockey in Switzerland is one of the most popular team sports in the country rivaling football in terms of attendances and TV ratings.

== History ==
In September 1908, the Swiss Ice Hockey Association became a member of the International Ice Hockey Federation. Bellerive would go on to win the first national championship just one year later. Within a decade, the Swiss Ice Hockey Association expanded to 23 distinguished clubs.

In 1922, the Ice Hockey European Championships was hosted in St. Moritz and, two years later, Davos held the first Spengler Cup.

In 1924, the Switzerland men's national ice hockey team participated in the first ice hockey tournament at the 1924 Winter Olympics in Chamonix. Four years later, they won Olympic bronze in the ice hockey tournament at the 1928 Winter Olympics in St. Moritz. The national team also won the 1926 Ice Hockey European Championship and were silver medalists at the 1935 Ice Hockey World Championships and bronze medalists at the 1939 Ice Hockey World Championships.

== Governing body ==
The Swiss Ice Hockey Federation organizes amateur and professional ice hockey in the country. The Spengler Cup is one of the biggest ice hockey tournaments in all of Switzerland and holds the title of oldest invitational ice hockey tournament in the world, capturing the attention of millions of hockey fans throughout the nation annually.

== National leagues ==
=== Men ===
National League (NL) is the highest professional tier in Swiss men's hockey, called the National League A until 2017. Below the National League are the professional Swiss League, previously called the National League B, followed by the third-tier MySports League. The amateur Regio League comprises the 1. Liga, 2. Liga, 3. Liga, and 4. Liga, which make up the 4th, 5th, 6th and 7th levels of Swiss men’s ice hockey respectively. The National League regularly holds the record for highest average attendances of any league outside of North America. During the 2022/23 regular season, the 14 teams achieved an average attendance of more than 7000 spectators per game.

=== Women ===
The top women’s hockey league in Switzerland was founded in 1986 as the Leistungsklasse A (LKA; 'Performance Class A'), officially known in French as the Ligue nationale A (LNA) and in Italian as the Lega Nazionale A (LNA). It was renamed as the Swiss Women's Hockey League A (SWHL A) in 2014. In 2019, the league name was shortened to Women's League, the name currently in use, though SWHL A continues to be used for abbreviation by many sources. The EHC Kloten Specials were named the first Swiss Champions in women's ice hockey after winning the inaugural season of the league in 1986–87.

As ice hockey grew in popularity among young women throughout the nation, a second-tier league called the Leistungsklasse B (LKB), was formed in 1988. Additional lower-level leagues were created over time and eventually adopted designations as parts of the SWHL league system. As of 2021, three national leagues exist below the Women's League: SWHL B, SWHL C, and SWHL D.

== National team ==
The Swiss national team badge is based on the coat of arms of Switzerland and is used on the player jerseys.

=== Men ===
Overall International Record: 519-619-125

They have 67 IIHF Championships appearances dating back to 1930. This includes six distinguished second place finishes in 1935, 2013, 2018, 2024, 2025 and 2026. Additionally, they have made eight European Championship appearances, including a first place gold finish in 1921.

The men’s national team boasts a respected twenty Olympic appearances, including bronze medal finishes in 1928 and 1948.

=== Women ===
The women's national team has participated in every iteration of the IIHF Women's World Championship since the tournament was officially established in 1990 and have played exclusively in the Top Division since 2007. They have appeared in every women's ice hockey tournament at the Winter Olympics since 2006. In addition, they participated in all six IIHF European Women Championships before the tournament was discontinued after 1995.

The Swiss women's national team boasts a bronze medal from each major international tournament. They won a bronze medal at the 1995 IIHF European Women Championships, the 2012 IIHF Women's World Championship, and in the women's ice hockey tournament at the 2014 Winter Olympics.

== Notable Swiss players in the NHL ==
Switzerland has produced several hockey talents who have made it to the National Hockey League level. While not a traditional hockey powerhouse, Switzerland continues to maintain a growing presence in the NHL as well as in international competition

=== David Aebischer ===
Aebischer was a goaltender drafted in the 6th round by the Colorado Avalanche. Although mostly relegated to backup duties for most of his career he was a member of the Stanley Cup winning Avalanche in the 2001 finals. This was notable as he was the first player from Switzerland to win the Stanley Cup. Aebischer also later played for the Montreal Canadiens and the Phoenix Coyotes along with various Swiss teams.

=== Mark Streit ===
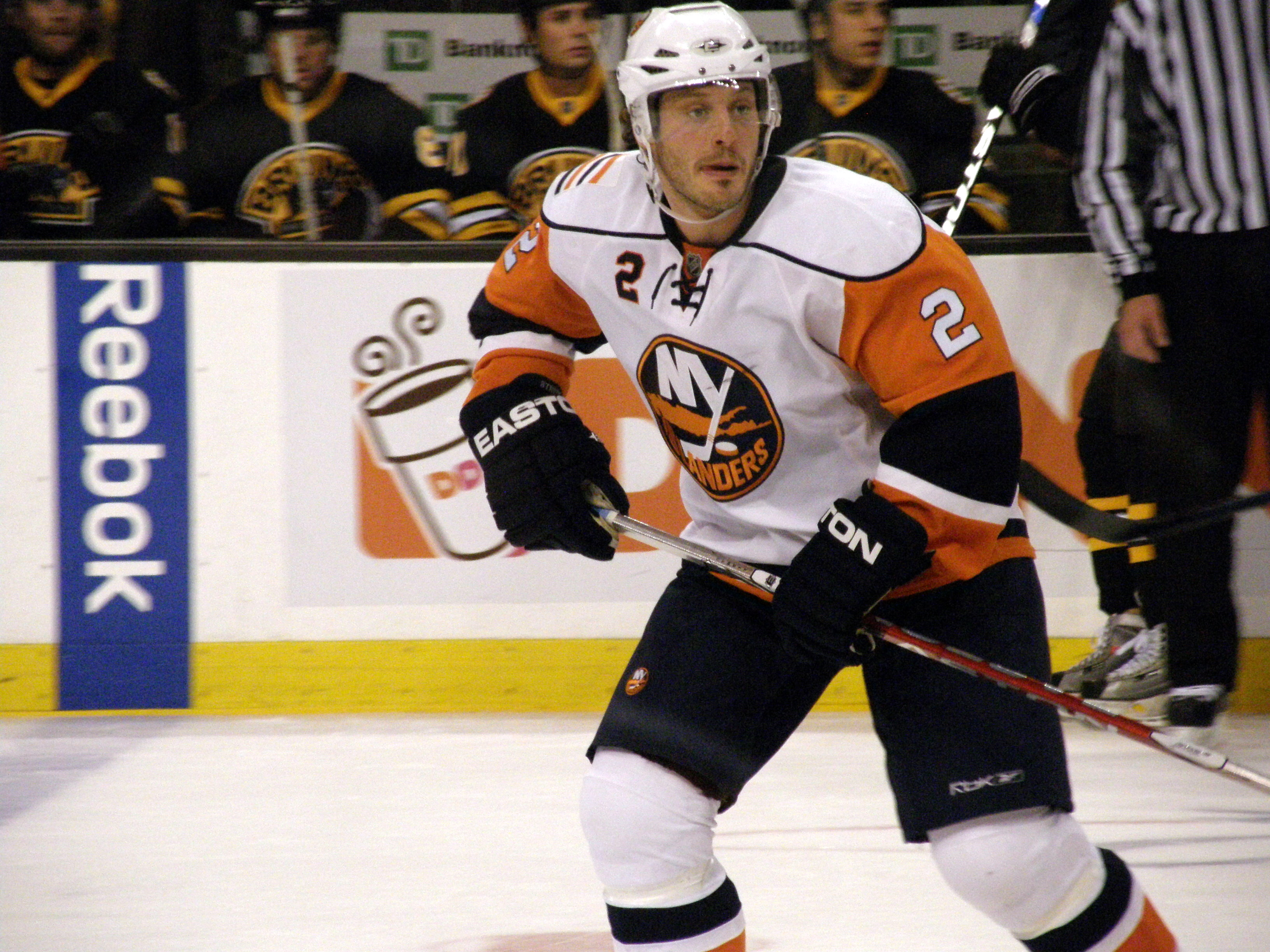

Streit was named the 13th captain in New York Islanders franchise history. This was a major milestone for hockey in Switzerland as Streit was the first Swiss player to be named the captain of an NHL franchise. He has also served as the captain of Team Switzerland at the Winter Olympic Games. Streit was drafted in the ninth round of the 2004 NHL Draft. He also later played with the Philadelphia Flyers, Pittsburgh Penguins, and Montreal Canadiens.

=== Jonas Hiller ===
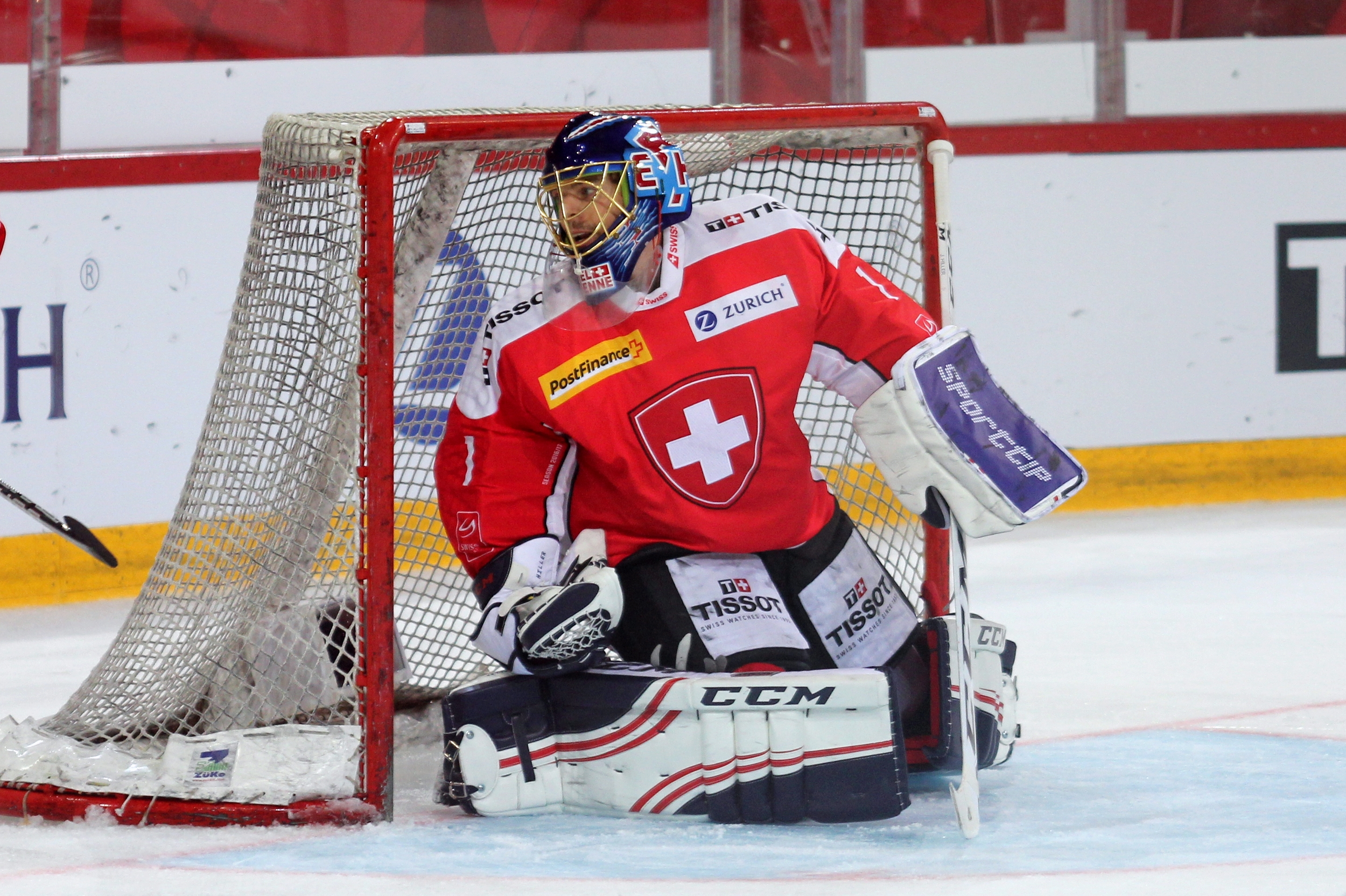
Jonas Hiller

Although Hiller went undrafted he was able to have a successful NHL career in which he played in over 400 games. Hiller started his career in Anaheim with the Ducks in 2007. He played in Anaheim for seven years before spending the final two years of his career with the Calgary Flames.

=== Nino Niederreiter ===
Nino Niederreiter is an NHL forward currently playing for the Winnipeg Jets. Niederreiter made history in the 2010 NHL draft when he was selected fifth overall by the New York Islanders. Although not initially finding much success initially with the Islanders, Niederreiter hit his stride after being traded to the Minnesota Wild for Cal Clutterbuck in 2013 scoring a career high 25 goals in the 2016-2017.

=== Roman Josi ===
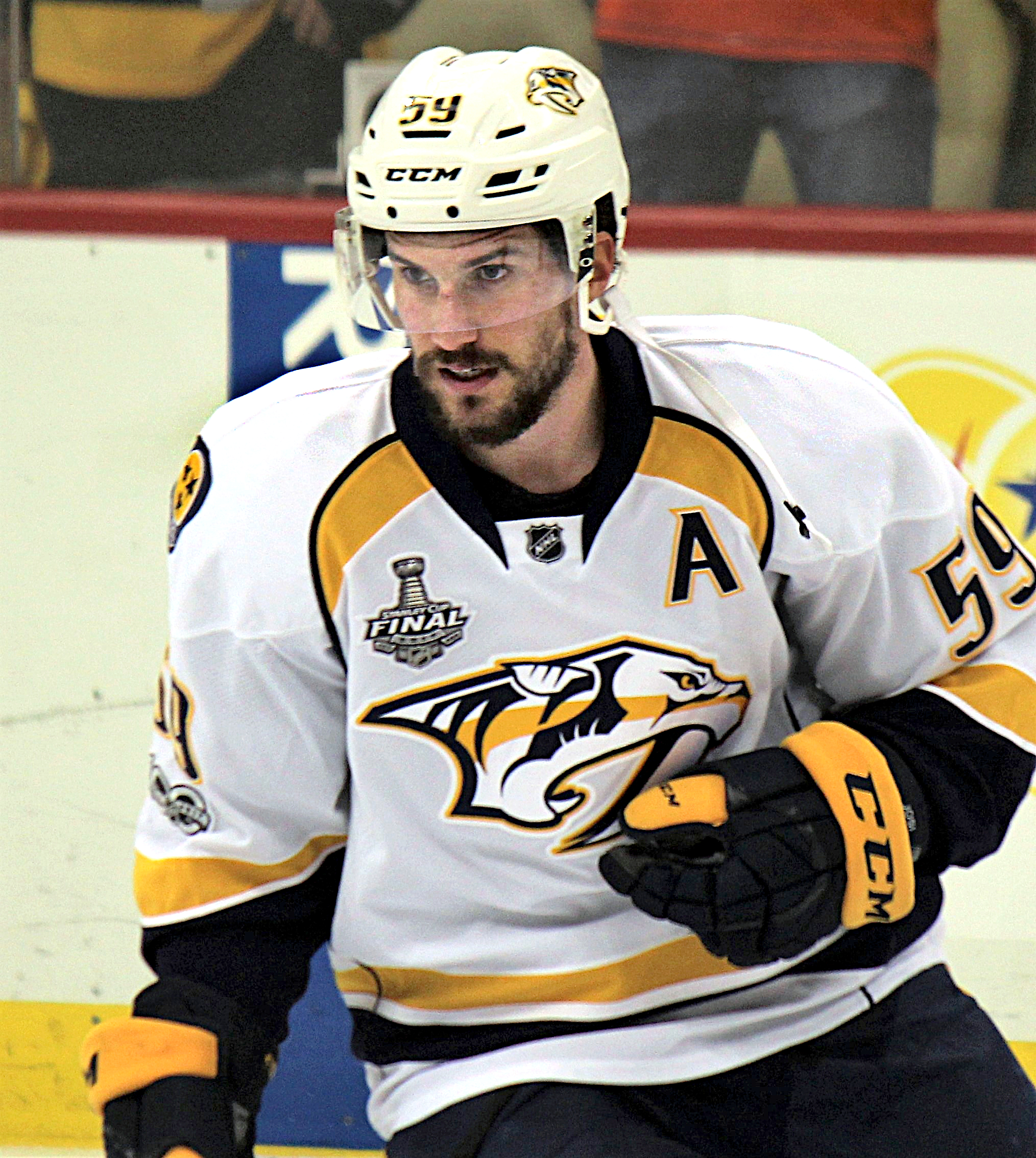
Roman Josi

After being drafted in the second round of the 2008 NHL draft by Nashville he made his debut in 2011. Josi made some history in the 2013 World Championships by becoming the first player to win MVP and Best Defenseman for Switzerland in the history of this tournament in route to helping Switzerland earn a Silver Medal. Josi has since played in two NHL All Star games and been named captain of the Predators.

=== Timo Meier ===
Meier is among the emerging young group of highly touted Swiss to enter the NHL in recent years. Meier was the ninth overall pick in the 2015 NHL draft by the San Jose Sharks. He was able to crack the NHL in the 2016 season and scored a career high 30 goals and 66 points in the 2018-2019 season.

=== Nico Hischier ===
After being a major success playing in the QMJHL for Halifax, Hischier was considered a top prospect in his draft class and was ranked number two out of North American Skaters. However, Hischier was considered the best overall player by many top NHL scouts, so it wasn’t too surprising when New Jersey selected him first overall in the 2017 NHL Draft.

Hischier broke the record for highest drafted Swiss player previously held by Niederreiter when he was selected first overall by the Devils in the 2017 NHL draft.

=== Other Notable Players ===
There have been other hockey players of Swiss nationality to have played in the NHL recently and in the past. Some of these include Martin Gerber, Raphael Diaz, Yannick Weber, Luca Sbisa, Reto Berra, Sven Andrighetto, Kevin Fiala, Denis Malgin, Sven Bärtschi, Gaëtan Haas, Dean Kukan, Joel Vermin, Christoph Bertschy, Mirco Müller, Gilles Senn, Calvin Thürkauf and Jonas Siegenthaler.

== Attendances ==
The average attendance per top-flight league season and the ice hockey club with the highest average attendance:

| Season | League average | Best club | Best club average |
|---|---|---|---|
| 2022-23 | 5,786 | SC Bern | 14,750 |
