= Thibaut Monnet =

Swiss ice hockey player

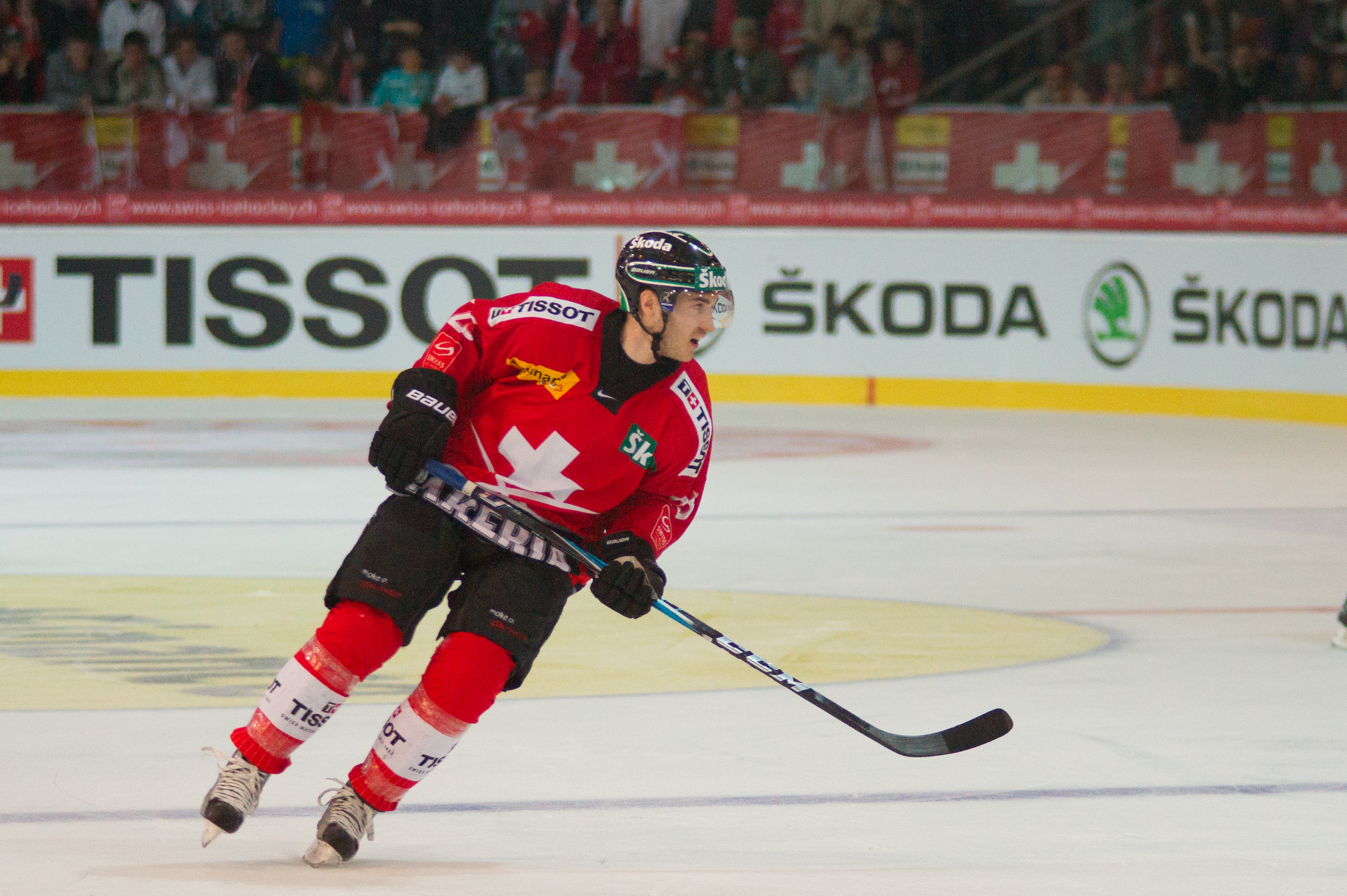
- Born: 2 February 1982 (age 43) Martigny, Switzerland
- Height: 5 ft 11 in (180 cm)
- Weight: 189 lb (86 kg; 13 st 7 lb)
- Position: Right wing
- Shoots: Left
- SL team Former teams: HC Sierre; HC Martigny; Lausanne HC; HC La Chaux-de-Fonds; HC Fribourg-Gottéron; SC Langnau; SC Bern; ZSC Lions; HC Ambrì-Piotta; EHC Kloten; EHC Winterthur
- National team: Switzerland
- Playing career: 1997–present

Medal record

Ice hockey

Representing Switzerland

World Championships
Silver medal – second place	2013 Sweden/Finland	

Thibaut Monnet (born 2 February 1982) is a Swiss professional ice hockey right winger who currently plays for HC Sierre in the Swiss League (SL).

Monnet began playing professional with HC Martigny of the National League B. He began at the top level with HC La Chaux-de-Fonds in 2000.

Monnet was selected to play for the Swiss national team at the 2010 Winter Olympics. He previously represented Switzerland at the 1999 and 2000 IIHF World U18 Championship, the 2001 and 2002 IIHF World U20 Championships, and the 2007, 2008 and 2009 Ice Hockey World Championships.

== Career statistics ==
=== Regular season and playoffs ===
			Regular season					Playoffs
Season	Team	League	GP	G	A	Pts	PIM	GP	G	A	Pts	PIM
1997–98	HC Martigny	SUI.2 U20
1997–98	HC Martigny	SUI.2	14	0	0	0	2	—	—	—	—	—
1997–98	HC Sion	SUI.3	15	8	4	12		—	—	—	—	—
1998–99	HC Martigny	SUI.2 U20
1998–99	HC Martigny	SUI.2	38	2	7	9	10	—	—	—	—	—
1998–99	HC Nendaz	SUI.4	4	8	3	11		—	—	—	—	—
1999–2000	HC Ambrì–Piotta	SUI U20	5	4	4	8	4	—	—	—	—	—
1999–2000	Lausanne HC	SUI.2	35	14	9	23	20	4	0	1	1	4
2000–01	HC La Chaux–de–Fonds	NLA	39	15	8	23	42	—	—	—	—	—
2001–02	HC Fribourg–Gottéron	NLA	38	10	12	22	22	5	1	2	3	2
2002–03	HC Fribourg–Gottéron	NLA	44	14	10	24	32	—	—	—	—	—
2003–04	SC Langnau	NLA	48	24	13	37	79	—	—	—	—	—
2004–05	SC Langnau	NLA	44	10	20	30	26	—	—	—	—	—
2005–06	SC Bern	NLA	44	8	9	17	18	2	0	0	0	0
2006–07	HC Fribourg–Gottéron	NLA	44	14	23	37	54	—	—	—	—	—
2007–08	ZSC Lions	NLA	50	18	25	43	40	17	4	11	15	6
2008–09	ZSC Lions	NLA	50	14	21	35	32	4	1	1	2	6
2009–10	ZSC Lions	NLA	49	24	15	39	42	7	4	4	8	4
2010–11	ZSC Lions	NLA	47	13	23	36	38	5	5	1	6	6
2011–12	ZSC Lions	NLA	48	5	16	21	4	15	5	8	13	0
2012–13	ZSC Lions	NLA	50	18	19	37	22	12	4	5	9	2
2013–14	HC Fribourg–Gottéron	NLA	49	15	14	29	26	9	1	2	3	0
2014–15	HC Fribourg–Gottéron	NLA	35	6	8	14	14	—	—	—	—	—
2015–16	HC Ambrì–Piotta	NLA	48	13	13	26	18	—	—	—	—	—
2016–17	HC Ambrì–Piotta	NLA	47	10	10	20	14	—	—	—	—	—
2017–18	HC Ambrì–Piotta	NL	19	1	2	3	4	—	—	—	—	—
2018–19	EHC Kloten	SUI.2	43	17	10	27	16	5	1	2	3	2
2019–20	EHC Winterthur	SUI.2	44	6	18	24	10	—	—	—	—	—
2020–21	HC Sierre	SUI.2	44	10	19	29	26	4	2	1	3	0
SUI.2 totals			218	49	63	112	84	13	3	4	7	6
NLA/NL totals			793	232	261	493	527	76	25	34	59	26

=== International ===
Year	Team	Event	GP	G	A	Pts	PIM
1999	Switzerland	WJC18	7	2	1	3	0
2000	Switzerland	WJC18	7	4	3	7	6
2001	Switzerland	WJC	7	2	5	7	6
2002	Switzerland	WJC	7	3	2	5	14
2007	Switzerland	WC	7	1	1	2	0
2008	Switzerland	WC	7	1	2	3	10
2009	Switzerland	WC	3	0	0	0	0
2010	Switzerland	OG	5	0	1	1	0
2010	Switzerland	WC	7	2	2	4	6
2011	Switzerland	WC	6	1	0	1	2
2012	Switzerland	WC	5	0	0	0	0
2013	Switzerland	WC	1	0	0	0	0
Junior totals			28	11	11	22	26
Senior totals			41	5	6	11	20
