= List of indoor arenas in Switzerland =

The following is a list of indoor arenas in Switzerland with a capacity of at least 1,000 spectators, most of the arenas in this list are for multi use proposes and are used for popular sports such as individual sports like karate, judo, boxing as well as team sports like Ice Hockey, Curling, volleyball. Parts of the arenas also host many concerts and world tours.

== Currently in use ==
Location	Arena	Date built	Capacity	Tenants	Image
Baar	Waldmannhalle	1996	1,200		
Basel	St. Jakobshalle	1976	12,400		
Basel	St. Jakob Arena	2002	6,700	EHC Basel	
Bellinzona	Centro Sportivo	1997	2,180	GDT Bellinzona Snakes	
Bern	PostFinance Arena	1967	17,000	SC Bern	
Bienne	Tissot Arena	2015	6,521	EHC Biel	
Bienne	Bienne Eisstadion	1973	7,000		
Chur	Hallenstadion		6,545	EHC Chur	
Davos	Eisstadion Davos	1979	7,080	HC Davos	
Fribourg	BCF Arena	1983	8,934	Fribourg-Gottéron	
Geneva	Patinoire des Vernets	1958	7,135	Genève-Servette HC	
Geneva	Geneva Arena	1995	9,500		
Kreuzlingen	Bodensee Arena	2000	4,000		
Kriens	Pilatus Arena	2025	4,060	HC Kriens-Luzern	
Küsnacht	Eishalle Küsnacht	1993	2,200	GCK Lions	
La Chaux-de-Fonds	Patinoire des Mélèzes	1953	5,800	HC La Chaux-de-Fonds	
Langnau IE	Emmental Versicherung Arena	1975	6,000	SCL Tigers	
Lausanne	Vaudoise Aréna	2019	9,600	Lausanne HC	
Lugano	Pista La Resega	1957	7,800	HC Lugano	
Olten	Kleinholz Stadion	1961	6,500	EHC Olten	
Martigny	Forum d'Octodure	1955	4,500	HCV Martigny	
Quinto	Nuova Valascia	2021	7,000	HC Ambrì-Piotta	
Rapperswil-Jona	St. Galler Kantonalbank Arena	1987	6,100	SC Rapperswil-Jona Lakers	
Sierre	Patinoire de Graben	1958	4,500	HC Sierre	
Visp	Lonza Arena	2019	5,500	EHC Visp	
Weinfelden	Güttingersreuti	1981	3,100	Hockey Thurgau	
Winterthur	Zielbau Arena	2002	3,000	EHC Winterthur	
Zug	Bossard Arena	2010	7,200	EV Zug	
Zürich	Swiss Arena	1952	7,624		
Zürich	Swiss Life Arena	2022	11,157	ZSC Lions	
Zürich	Hallenstadion	1939	11,200		

== See also ==
- List of football stadiums in Switzerland
- List of indoor arenas by capacity
- Lists of stadiums
