= Jared Aulin =

Canadian ice hockey player (born 1982)

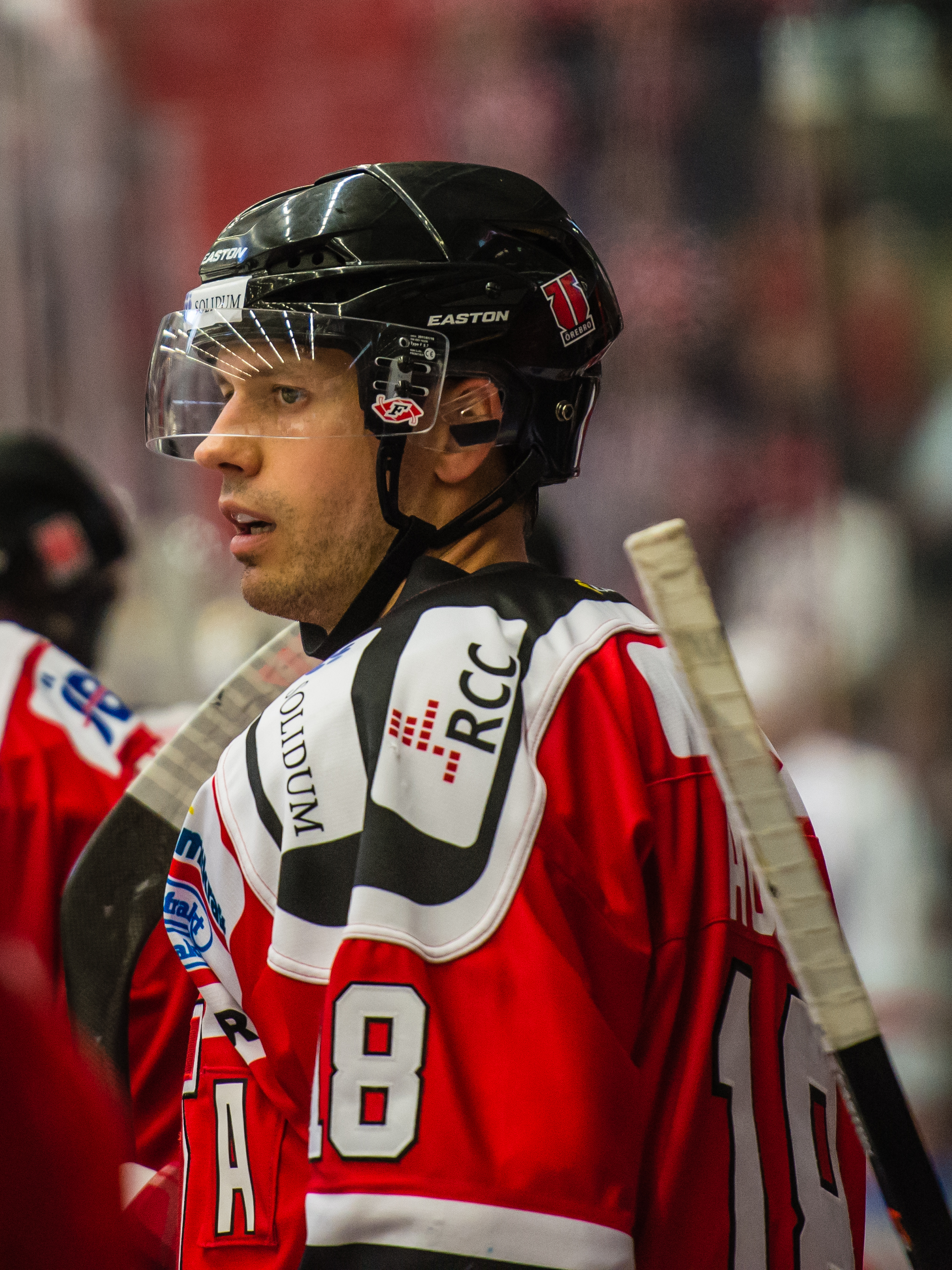
- Aulin with Örebro HK in 2013
- Born: March 15, 1982 (age 44) Calgary, Alberta, Canada
- Height: 6 ft 0 in (183 cm)
- Weight: 192 lb (87 kg; 13 st 10 lb)
- Position: Centre
- Shot: Right
- Played for: Los Angeles Kings; Örebro HK; SC Rapperswil-Jona Lakers; Straubing Tigers; Manchester Storm
- NHL draft: 47th overall, 2000; Colorado Avalanche
- Playing career: 2002–2021

Jared Aulin (born March 15, 1982) is a Canadian former professional hockey centre. He was a second round selection of the Colorado Avalanche in the 2000 National Hockey League (NHL) Entry Draft and played 17 NHL games for the Los Angeles Kings.

== Playing career ==
=== Amateur ===
As a youth, Aulin played in the 1996 Quebec International Pee-Wee Hockey Tournament with the Calgary Junior Flames minor ice hockey team.

After playing with the Airdrie Extreme in 1997–98, Aulin joined the Kamloops Blazers of the Western Hockey League as 16-year-old in 1998–99, netting 26 points in 55 games and a trip to the league finals. After leading the league in points through nine games, he played through an ankle injury which caused his production to dip, finishing with 55 points during the 1999–2000 season (57 games), attracting the attention of the Colorado Avalanche, who drafted Aulin in the second round (47th overall) of the 2000 NHL entry draft. In the 2000–01 season with the Blazers, Aulin scored a team leading 108 points in 70 games. During this time Aulin's rights were traded by the Avalanche to the Los Angeles Kings in an exchange that saw Rob Blake head to Colorado on March 22, 2001.

Before the end of his junior career, Aulin won silver with Team Canada at the 2002 World Junior Ice Hockey Championships, collecting 9 points in 7 tournament games.

=== Professional ===
On June 1, 2002, Aulin signed a three-year entry-level contract with the Kings. Aulin made his professional debut in the following 2002–03 season with Kings affiliate, the Manchester Monarchs. During the season, Aulin also made his NHL debut with the Kings, appearing in 17 games. Aulin scored his only two goals against the Carolina Hurricanes in an 8–2 victory on February 7, 2003.

In the 2003–04 pre-season with the Kings, Aulin suffered a shoulder injury which required surgery. Aulin remained injured for the majority of the season and was subsequently traded to the Washington Capitals for Anson Carter on March 9, 2004. Jared made his return from injury with the Capitals' AHL affiliate Portland Pirates to end the season.

Aulin spent the next two seasons with the Capitals' affiliates without a call-up to the NHL. After not being offered a contract with the Capitals for the 2006–07 season, Aulin signed with the AHL Springfield Falcons on October 7, 2006. Jared played in only 13 games with the Falcons before he was released after aggravating his recurring shoulder injury.

During the summer of 2007, Aulin returned to hockey playing in a non-contact summer league with the TH Pirates in Calgary. While leading the league in scoring, Aulin was knocked unconscious and hospitalised when he was the victim of a two-handed slash to the neck in a game. Aulin pressed charges against the offender, but the incident left him jaded and considering retirement. Aulin later returned to Hockey in the 2007–08 season with the University of Calgary in the CIS. This marked the first time in 20 years that an NHL player returned to play in the CIS.

After further shoulder rehab, Aulin attempted a return to professional hockey and was invited to the Columbus Blue Jackets training camp for the 2009–10 season. He was later reassigned to the Blue Jackets' AHL affiliate, the Syracuse Crunch, training camp and made the Crunch's opening night on a try-out basis. After 31 games with Syracuse, and placing third in scoring, Aulin was signed to an AHL contract for the remainder of the season with the Crunch on January 2, 2010.

A free agent prior to the 2010–11 season, Aulin accepted a tryout invitation to the Edmonton Oilers training camp before he was released during the pre-season on September 27, 2010. On October 29, 2010, Aulin belatedly left North America and signed a one-year contract with Swedish team, Leksands IF, of the second tier HockeyAllsvenkan.

On June 28, 2011, Aulin signed a one-year deal to remain in the HockeyAllsvenskan with Örebro HK.

After four seasons with Örebro HK, the last two solidifying the club's position in the Swedish Hockey League, Aulin left Sweden as a free agent and signed a one-year deal with newly relegated Swiss club, SC Rapperswil-Jona Lakers of the National League B (NLB) on June 23, 2015.

In his third season with the Lakers, Aulin helped the club clinch promotion from the Swiss League back to the National League. In the following 2018–19 season, Aulin played 19 games registering just 4 assists in the top flight league, before leaving the club mid-season in joining German outfit, the Straubing Tigers of the DEL for the remainder of the year on December 28, 2018.

On 9 August 2019, Aulin joined his brother-in-law Layne Ulmer by signing for UK EIHL side Manchester Storm.

On July 26, 2021, Jared announced his retirement from hockey via his Instagram page.

== Career statistics ==
=== Regular season and playoffs ===
			Regular season					Playoffs
Season	Team	League	GP	G	A	Pts	PIM	GP	G	A	Pts	PIM
1997–98	Kamloops Blazers	WHL	2	0	0	0	0	—	—	—	—	—
1998–99	Kamloops Blazers	WHL	55	7	19	26	23	13	1	3	4	2
1999–2000	Kamloops Blazers	WHL	57	17	38	55	70	4	0	1	1	6
2000–01	Kamloops Blazers	WHL	70	31	77	108	62	4	0	2	2	0
2001–02	Kamloops Blazers	WHL	46	33	34	67	80	4	1	2	3	2
2002–03	Manchester Monarchs	AHL	44	12	32	44	21	3	0	4	4	0
2002–03	Los Angeles Kings	NHL	17	2	2	4	0	—	—	—	—	—
2003–04	Portland Pirates	AHL	10	2	1	3	4	6	1	1	2	4
2004–05	Portland Pirates	AHL	65	11	28	39	30	—	—	—	—	—
2005–06	Hershey Bears	AHL	61	11	28	39	38	5	0	0	0	6
2006–07	Springfield Falcons	AHL	13	2	2	4	2	—	—	—	—	—
2007–08	University of Calgary	CWUAA	16	14	20	34	22	—	—	—	—	—
2009–10	Syracuse Crunch	AHL	64	16	21	37	36	—	—	—	—	—
2010–11	Leksands IF	Allsv	36	10	20	30	28	5	3	0	3	6
2011–12	Örebro HK	Allsv	49	25	33	58	24	9	0	4	4	6
2012–13	Örebro HK	Allsv	48	16	34	50	34	—	—	—	—	—
2013–14	Örebro HK	SHL	50	7	20	27	36	—	—	—	—	—
2014–15	Örebro HK	SHL	47	7	17	24	6	3	0	2	2	2
2015–16	Rapperswil–Jona Lakers	SUI.2	45	11	34	45	22	12	3	6	9	0
2016–17	Rapperswil–Jona Lakers	SUI.2	47	19	35	54	24	14	2	6	8	14
2017–18	Rapperswil–Jona Lakers	SUI.2	39	11	35	46	18	13	4	10	14	2
2018–19	Rapperswil–Jona Lakers	NL	19	0	4	4	8	—	—	—	—	—
2018–19	Straubing Tigers	DEL	19	1	9	10	0	2	0	0	0	0
2019–20	Manchester Storm	EIHL	48	10	35	45	26	—	—	—	—	—
NHL totals			17	2	2	4	0	—	—	—	—	—

Medal record

Representing Canada

Ice hockey

World Junior Championships
Silver medal – second place	2002 Pardubice	

=== International ===
Year	Team	Event	Result	GP	G	A	Pts	PIM
1999	Canada	U18	1st place, gold medalist(s)	3	1	2	3	2
2002	Canada	WJC	2nd place, silver medalist(s)	7	4	5	9	4
Junior totals				10	5	7	12	6

== Awards and honours ==
Award	Year
WHL
West First Team All-Star	2000–01
West First Team All-Star	2001–02
