= Tobias Geisser =

Swiss ice hockey player (born 1999)

- Born: 13 February 1999 (age 27) Stans, Switzerland
- Height: 6 ft 4 in (193 cm)
- Weight: 91 kg (201 lb; 14 st 5 lb)
- Position: Defence
- Shoots: Left
- NL team Former teams: EV Zug; Hershey Bears
- National team: Switzerland
- NHL draft: 120th overall, 2017; Washington Capitals
- Playing career: 2016–present

Tobias Geisser (born 13 February 1999) is a Swiss professional ice hockey defenceman for EV Zug of the National League (NL) and the Swiss national team.

== Playing career ==
Geisser was drafted 120th overall in the 2017 NHL Entry Draft by the Washington Capitals and signed an entry-level contract on 22 March 2018.

Following the conclusion of his entry-level contract with the Capitals, and unable to make inroads within the organization, Geisser as an impending restricted free agent opted to return to Switzerland and re-join former club, EV Zug of the NL, on a three-year deal on 15 June 2022.

== International play ==
Geisser represented Switzerland at the 2021 IIHF World Championship.

== Career statistics ==
=== Regular season and playoffs ===
			Regular season					Playoffs
Season	Team	League	GP	G	A	Pts	PIM	GP	G	A	Pts	PIM
2014–15	Zug U20	Elite Jr. A	8	1	1	2	4	—	—	—	—	—
2015–16	Zug U20	Elite Jr. A	35	1	2	3	2	9	3	1	4	2
2016–17	Zug U20	Elite Jr. A	3	1	2	3	0	10	5	4	9	4
2016–17	EV Zug	NLA	14	0	1	1	0	—	—	—	—	—
2016–17	EVZ Academy	NLB	34	3	7	10	14	—	—	—	—	—
2017–18	EV Zug	NL	38	2	4	6	6	5	0	0	0	0
2018–19	Hershey Bears	AHL	41	0	1	1	6	6	0	0	0	0
2019–20	Hershey Bears	AHL	7	0	0	0	0	—	—	—	—	—
2019–20	EV Zug	NL	25	0	2	2	6	—	—	—	—	—
2020–21	EV Zug	NL	50	5	17	22	22	13	1	1	2	2
2021–22	Hershey Bears	AHL	68	3	10	13	20	3	0	1	1	0
2022–23	EV Zug	NL	52	8	14	22	10	11	1	3	4	4
2023–24	EV Zug	NL	35	1	11	12	4	11	0	1	1	0
2024–25	EV Zug	NL	44	4	13	17	12	2	0	0	0	2
NL totals			258	20	62	82	60	42	2	5	7	8

=== International ===
Year	Team	Event	Result	GP	G	A	Pts	PIM
2015	Switzerland	IH18	7th	4	0	1	1	0
2016	Switzerland	U18	8th	5	1	0	1	4
2016	Switzerland	IH18	8th	4	0	1	1	2
2017	Switzerland	U18	8th	5	0	0	0	0
2018	Switzerland	WJC	8th	5	0	0	0	2
2021	Switzerland	WC	6th	6	0	0	0	0
2022	Switzerland	WC	5th	8	0	1	1	4
2023	Switzerland	WC	5th	6	1	0	1	2
Junior totals				23	1	2	3	8
Senior totals				20	1	1	2	6
