= David McIntyre =

Canadian ice hockey player (born 1987)

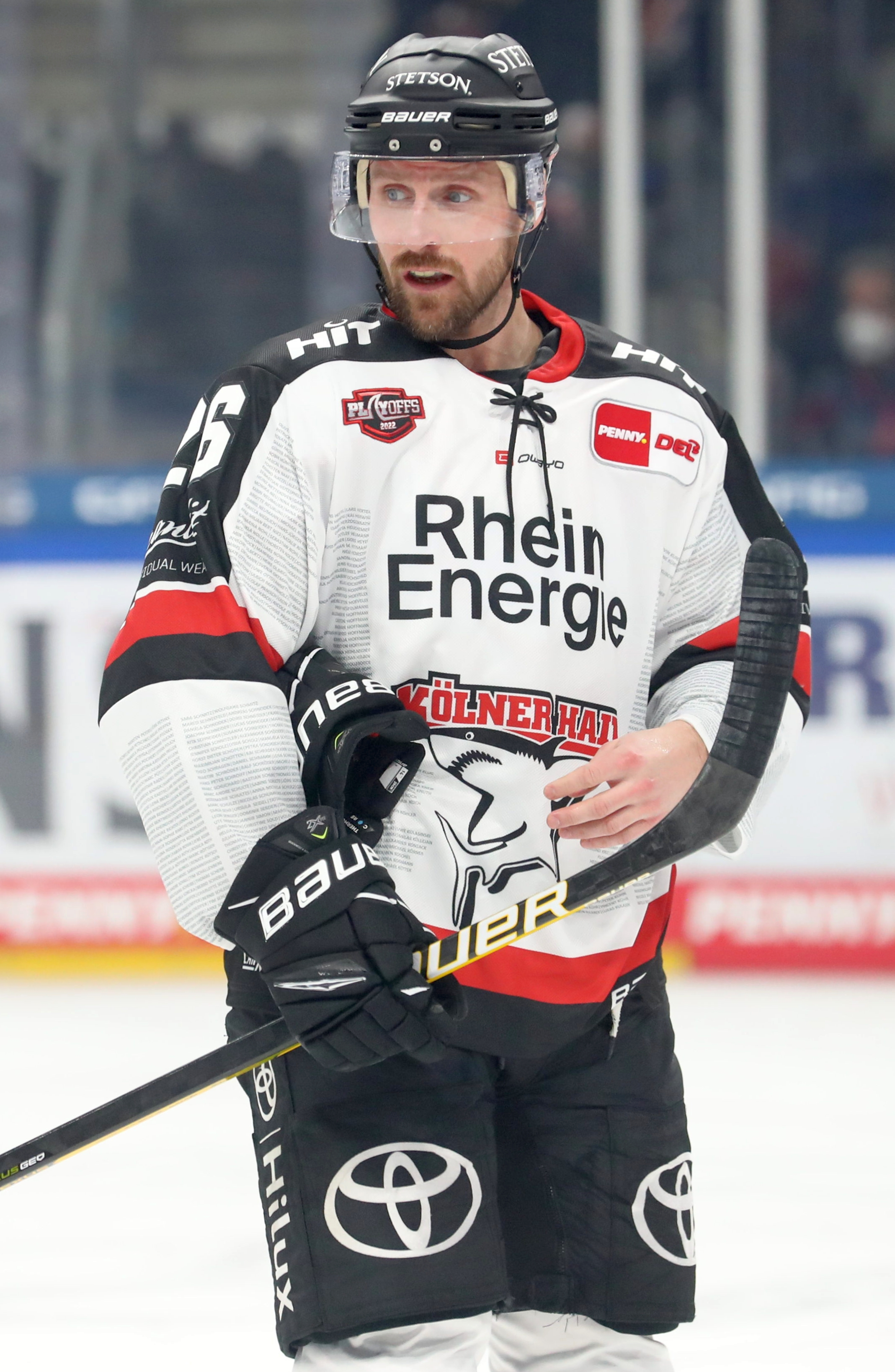
- Born: February 4, 1987 (age 39) Georgina, Ontario, Canada
- Height: 5 ft 11 in (180 cm)
- Weight: 194 lb (88 kg; 13 st 12 lb)
- Position: Centre
- Shot: Left
- Played for: Minnesota Wild; SaiPa; EV Zug; HC Lugano; EC Red Bull Salzburg; Kölner Haie
- NHL draft: 138th overall, 2006; Dallas Stars
- Playing career: 2010–2024

David John McIntyre (born February 4, 1987) is a Canadian former professional ice hockey forward who briefly played in the National Hockey League (NHL).

== Playing career ==
As a youth, McIntyre played in the 2001 Quebec International Pee-Wee Hockey Tournament with a minor ice hockey team from Whitby, Ontario.

McIntyre was selected by the Dallas Stars in the 5th round (138th overall) of the 2006 NHL entry draft.

On December 14, 2008, the Dallas Stars traded McIntyre and a 2010 sixth-round draft pick (Andreas Dahlstrom) to the Anaheim Ducks in exchange for Brian Sutherby. On February 3, 2009, the Ducks traded Mcintyre to the New Jersey Devils in exchange for Sheldon Brookbank.

He attended Colgate University from 2006 to 2010, serving as captain his senior season, while receiving the Terry Slater Trophy ("goes to the senior whose performance, leadership, and dedication on and off the ice during his career had the greatest impact on Colgate hockey") and the Rob Ries Memorial Award ("presented annually to a player who provides inspiration and leadership") and landing a spot on the All-ECAC Hockey Second Team.

Following the conclusion of the 2010–11 season, McIntyre was traded from the Devils to the Minnesota Wild for Maxim Noreau on June 16, 2011. McIntyre scored his first NHL goal on January 14, 2012 against Jaroslav Halak of the St. Louis Blues.

On July 25, 2013, McIntyre signed a one-year AHL contract with the Grand Rapids Griffins. In the 2013–14 season with the Griffins, McIntyre contributed with 8 goals and 21 points in 64 games.

McIntyre left North America to sign his first contract abroad on June 11, 2014, in agreeing to a one-year deal with Finnish Liiga club, SaiPa. After having his contract renewed, he led SaiPa in scoring in 2015-16, tallying 56 points (16 goals, 40 assists) in 58 games, which also ranked him second in the league. In April 2016, he signed a two-year deal with EV Zug of the Swiss top-flight National League A (NLA). In late December 2017, he helped Team Canada win gold at the Spengler Cup in Davos, scoring one goal in the championship game. In early December 2019, EV Zug assigned McIntyre to the EVZ Academy of the Swiss League, before releasing him on December 12, 2019. He had put up only 5 points through 20 NL games this season. On December 13, 2019, McIntyre joined HC Lugano on a one-year deal for the remainder of the 2019–20 season.

During the 2021–22 season, having returned for a second stint in the Liiga with SaiPa, McIntyre left the club mid-season to join German club, Kölner Haie of the DEL, for the remainder of the campaign.

After a successful tenure with Kölner Haie, McIntyre was re-signed to a one-year contract extension on July 15, 2022. Following his third season with Kölner Haie at the conclusion of the 2023–24 campaign, McIntrye announced his retirement from his 14-year professional career on March 16, 2024.

== Career statistics ==
			Regular season					Playoffs
Season	Team	League	GP	G	A	Pts	PIM	GP	G	A	Pts	PIM
2003–04	Georgina Ice	COJHL	36	25	26	51	42	—	—	—	—	—
2004–05	Newmarket Hurricanes	OPJHL	46	17	14	31	33	16	8	7	15	20
2005–06	Newmarket Hurricanes	OPJHL	46	42	50	92	143	11	4	8	12	42
2006–07	Colgate University	ECAC	40	9	8	17	75	—	—	—	—	—
2007–08	Colgate University	ECAC	39	15	17	32	38	—	—	—	—	—
2008–09	Colgate University	ECAC	37	21	22	43	54	—	—	—	—	—
2009–10	Colgate University	ECAC	35	11	28	39	60	—	—	—	—	—
2009–10	Lowell Devils	AHL	12	3	2	5	8	5	1	1	2	0
2010–11	Albany Devils	AHL	78	12	18	30	51	—	—	—	—	—
2011–12	Houston Aeros	AHL	63	16	16	32	73	4	0	0	0	6
2011–12	Minnesota Wild	NHL	7	1	1	2	2	—	—	—	—	—
2012–13	Houston Aeros	AHL	68	15	18	33	45	5	2	1	3	0
2013–14	Grand Rapids Griffins	AHL	64	8	13	21	45	10	1	1	2	9
2014–15	SaiPa	Liiga	48	12	20	32	36	7	1	6	7	4
2015–16	SaiPa	Liiga	58	16	40	56	67	6	0	2	2	4
2016–17	EV Zug	NLA	47	17	30	47	34	16	11	8	19	12
2017–18	EV Zug	NL	44	15	22	37	32	5	2	3	5	4
2018–19	EV Zug	NL	30	5	15	20	36	9	3	2	5	4
2019–20	EV Zug	NL	20	3	2	5	30	—	—	—	—	—
2019–20	EVZ Academy	SUI.2	1	0	0	0	2	—	—	—	—	—
2019–20	HC Lugano	NL	22	6	12	18	10	—	—	—	—	—
2020–21	EC Red Bull Salzburg	ICEHL	30	3	11	14	22	11	3	2	5	12
2021–22	SaiPa	Liiga	37	4	9	13	30	—	—	—	—	—
2021–22	Kölner Haie	DEL	14	4	5	9	6	5	2	1	3	0
2022–23	Kölner Haie	DEL	56	21	17	38	18	6	3	2	5	0
2023–24	Kölner Haie	DEL	48	7	11	18	12	3	1	0	1	2
NHL totals			7	1	1	2	2	—	—	—	—	—
Liiga totals			143	32	69	101	133	13	1	8	9	8
NL totals			163	46	81	127	142	30	16	13	29	20

== Awards and honours ==
Award	Year
College
All-ECAC Hockey First Team	2008–09
AHCA East First-Team All-American	2008–09
All-ECAC Hockey Second Team	2009–10
