= Sarah Forster =

Swiss ice hockey player (born 1993)

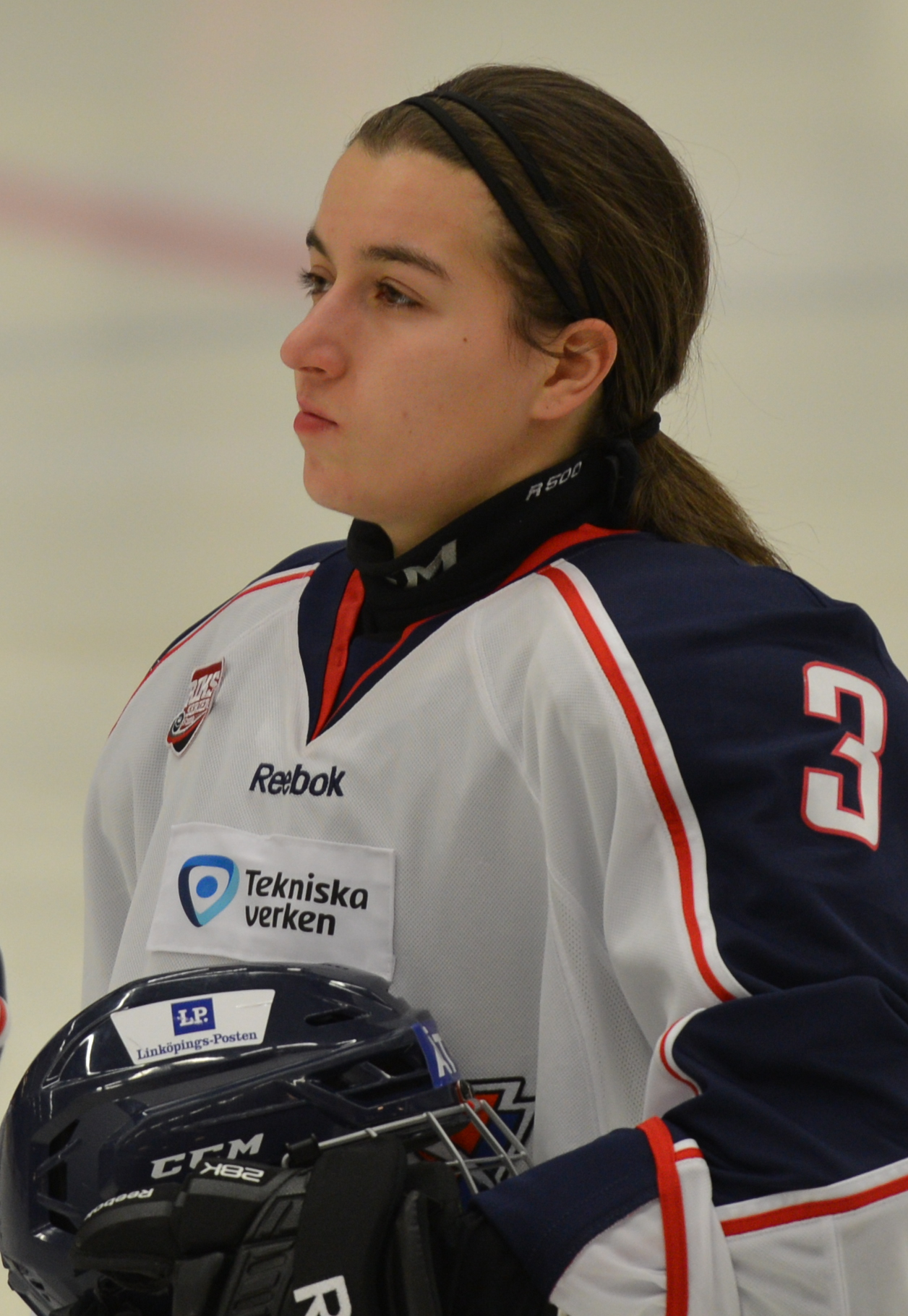
- Forster with Linköping HC during the 2015 Swedish Championship finals
- Born: 19 May 1993 (age 33) Berneck, St. Gallen, Switzerland
- Height: 1.70 m (5 ft 7 in)
- Weight: 65 kg (143 lb; 10 st 3 lb)
- Position: Defence
- Shoots: Left
- PHF team Former teams: Metropolitan Riveters: AIK Hockey; Leksands IF; Brynäs IF; EV Bomo Thun; HC Université Neuchâtel; Linköping HC; Ladies Team Lugano
- National team: Switzerland
- Playing career: 2011–present
Medal record
Olympic Games
Bronze medal – third place	2014 Sochi	Ice hockey
World Championship
Bronze medal – third place	2012 United States

Sarah Forster (born 19 May 1993) is a Swiss ice hockey player and member of the Swiss national team who played in the now defunct Premier Hockey Federation (PHF) with the Metropolitan Riveters. A three-time Olympian, she won a bronze medal with Switzerland in the women's ice hockey tournament at the 2014 Winter Olympics and competed in the women's ice hockey tournament at the 2018 Winter Olympics and the women's ice hockey tournament at the 2022 Winter Olympics. Forster has participated in seven IIHF Women's World Championships during 2012 to 2021, and won a bronze medal at the 2012 tournament.

== Personal life ==
Forster comes from a hockey playing family. Her father, Marcel, played in the National League B (NLB) throughout the 1980s and served as assistant coach to HC Ajoie during 2011 to 2015. Her two younger siblings play ice hockey in Swiss leagues – Gaëtan (born 1997) in the 2. Liga of the Regio League and Justine (born 2001) in the Swiss Women's Hockey League B (SWHL B).
