= Josh Holden =

Canadian ice hockey player (born 1978)

- Born: January 18, 1978 (age 48) Calgary, Alberta, Canada
- Height: 6 ft 1 in (185 cm)
- Weight: 180 lb (82 kg; 12 st 12 lb)
- Position: Centre
- Shot: Left
- Played for: Vancouver Canucks; Carolina Hurricanes; Toronto Maple Leafs; HPK; HC Fribourg-Gottéron; SC Langnau; EV Zug
- National team: Canada
- NHL draft: 12th overall, 1996; Vancouver Canucks
- Playing career: 1998–2018

Joshua Derek Adam Holden (born January 18, 1978) is a former Canadian professional ice hockey centre who is currently the head Coach for HC Davos of the National League (NL) in Switzerland. He was drafted in the first round, 12th overall, by the Vancouver Canucks in the 1996 NHL entry draft.

== Playing career ==
Holden was born in Calgary, Alberta. After playing four seasons in the Western Hockey League with the Regina Pats, finishing in the league's top ten in scoring in both 1995–96 and 1996–97, Holden made his National Hockey League debut with the Canucks in the 1998–99 season, appearing in 30 games. After he played in 16 games with the Canucks over the next two seasons, he was claimed in the NHL Waiver Draft by the Carolina Hurricanes before the 2001–02 season. Holden played in eight games with Carolina before rejoining the Canucks' organization. He then was traded by Vancouver to the Toronto Maple Leafs on June 23, 2002, in exchange for Jeff Farkas. In total, he appeared in 60 NHL games, scoring five goals and nine assists.

During the 2004–05 NHL lockout, Holden went to Finland's SM-liiga to play for HPK. While the NHL resumed play in 2005–06, Holden stayed in Europe, joining HC Fribourg-Gottéron of Switzerland's Nationalliga A. He was named MPP of the National League A in the 2009-2010 Season, based on an internal evaluation by the team's coaches and captains. In 2010, EV Zug and Holden announced a long-term contract extension.

On December 31, 2012, Josh Holden was part of the Canadian team that won the Spengler Cup.

On May 15, 2017, Holden agreed to a one-year contract extension to remain with the EV Zug organization and played with their affiliate, the EVZ Academy, in the Swiss League (SL). After retiring at the end of the 2017–18 season, he became the assistant coach for EV Zug for the 2018–19 season and resigned as assistant coach in 2019–20.

He is currently the head coach of HC Davos, guiding them in 2023 to their first Spengler Cup championship since 2011.

== Personal life ==
Holden was born in Calgary, Canada and has two sisters. He is married to Janie Holden and has three children: Noa, Maren and Kapri.

== Career statistics ==
=== Regular season and playoffs ===
| | | | Regular season | | | | | Playoffs |
| Season | Team | League | GP | G | A | Pts | PIM | GP | G | A | Pts | PIM |
|---|---|---|---|---|---|---|---|---|---|---|---|---|
| 1993–94 | Calgary Buffaloes Midget AAA | AMHL | 34 | 14 | 15 | 29 | 82 | — | — | — | — | — |
| 1994–95 | Regina Pats | WHL | 62 | 20 | 23 | 43 | 45 | 4 | 3 | 1 | 4 | 0 |
| 1995–96 | Regina Pats | WHL | 70 | 57 | 55 | 112 | 105 | 11 | 4 | 5 | 9 | 23 |
| 1996–97 | Regina Pats | WHL | 58 | 49 | 49 | 98 | 148 | 5 | 3 | 2 | 5 | 10 |
| 1997–98 | Regina Pats | WHL | 56 | 41 | 58 | 99 | 134 | 2 | 2 | 2 | 4 | 10 |
| 1998–99 | Vancouver Canucks | NHL | 30 | 2 | 4 | 6 | 10 | — | — | — | — | — |
| 1998–99 | Syracuse Crunch | AHL | 38 | 14 | 15 | 29 | 48 | — | — | — | — | — |
| 1999–2000 | Vancouver Canucks | NHL | 6 | 1 | 5 | 6 | 2 | — | — | — | — | — |
| 1999–2000 | Syracuse Crunch | AHL | 45 | 19 | 32 | 51 | 113 | 4 | 1 | 0 | 1 | 10 |
| 2000–01 | Vancouver Canucks | NHL | 10 | 1 | 0 | 1 | 0 | — | — | — | — | — |
| 2000–01 | Kansas City Blades | IHL | 60 | 27 | 26 | 53 | 136 | — | — | — | — | — |
| 2001–02 | Carolina Hurricanes | NHL | 8 | 0 | 0 | 0 | 2 | — | — | — | — | — |
| 2001–02 | Manitoba Moose | AHL | 68 | 16 | 17 | 33 | 187 | 7 | 1 | 1 | 2 | 4 |
| 2002–03 | Toronto Maple Leafs | NHL | 5 | 1 | 0 | 1 | 2 | — | — | — | — | — |
| 2002–03 | St. John's Maple Leafs | AHL | 65 | 24 | 29 | 53 | 123 | — | — | — | — | — |
| 2003–04 | Toronto Maple Leafs | NHL | 1 | 0 | 0 | 0 | 0 | — | — | — | — | — |
| 2003–04 | St. John's Maple Leafs | AHL | 52 | 22 | 33 | 55 | 106 | — | — | — | — | — |
| 2004–05 | HPK | SM-l | 51 | 21 | 15 | 36 | 94 | 10 | 6 | 1 | 7 | 12 |
| 2005–06 | HC Fribourg-Gottéron | NLA | 44 | 17 | 18 | 35 | 127 | — | — | — | — | — |
| 2006–07 | HC Fribourg-Gottéron | NLA | 38 | 13 | 21 | 34 | 54 | — | — | — | — | — |
| 2007–08 | SCL Tigers | NLA | 48 | 26 | 43 | 69 | 87 | — | — | — | — | — |
| 2008–09 | EV Zug | NLA | 49 | 17 | 32 | 49 | 100 | 10 | 1 | 3 | 4 | 20 |
| 2009–10 | EV Zug | NLA | 46 | 30 | 33 | 63 | 48 | 13 | 5 | 10 | 15 | 14 |
| 2010–11 | EV Zug | NLA | 43 | 16 | 35 | 51 | 54 | 6 | 1 | 3 | 4 | 4 |
| 2011–12 | EV Zug | NLA | 39 | 16 | 21 | 37 | 59 | 9 | 5 | 5 | 10 | 4 |
| 2012–13 | EV Zug | NLA | 50 | 18 | 18 | 36 | 50 | 14 | 6 | 11 | 17 | 12 |
| 2013–14 | EV Zug | NLA | 39 | 13 | 20 | 33 | 81 | — | — | — | — | — |
| 2014–15 | EV Zug | NLA | 34 | 15 | 16 | 31 | 68 | 4 | 3 | 1 | 4 | 2 |
| 2015–16 | EV Zug | NLA | 48 | 18 | 30 | 48 | 20 | 4 | 1 | 1 | 2 | 4 |
| 2016–17 | EV Zug | NLA | 49 | 14 | 25 | 39 | 83 | 13 | 3 | 6 | 9 | 12 |
| 2017–18 | EV Zug | NL | 19 | 2 | 3 | 5 | 8 | — | — | — | — | — |
| 2017–18 | EVZ Academy | SL | 31 | 9 | 19 | 28 | 36 | — | — | — | — | — |
| NHL totals | | | 60 | 5 | 9 | 14 | 16 | — | — | — | — | — |
| NL totals | | | 546 | 215 | 315 | 530 | 839 | 73 | 25 | 40 | 65 | 72 |

Medal record

Ice hockey

Representing Canada

Spengler Cup
| Gold medal – first place | 2012 Davos | |

=== International ===
| Year | Team | Event | GP | G | A | Pts | PIM |
|---|---|---|---|---|---|---|---|
| 1998 | Canada | WJC | 7 | 4 | 0 | 4 | 14 |
| Junior totals | | | 7 | 4 | 0 | 4 | 14 |

== Awards and achievements ==
- Named to the WHL East Second All-Star Team in 1998

Awards and achievements
| Preceded by Mattias Öhlund | Vancouver Canucks first-round draft pick 1996 | Succeeded by Brad Ference |
