= Kirill Starkov =

Russian-born Danish ice hockey player

- Born: 31 March 1987 (age 38) Sverdlovsk, USSR
- Height: 6 ft 0 in (183 cm)
- Weight: 209 lb (95 kg; 14 st 13 lb)
- Position: Right wing
- Shoots: Left
- Swiss 2. Liga team Former teams: HC Château-d'Oex; Frölunda HC; CSKA Moscow; Syracuse Crunch; IK Oskarshamn
- National team: Denmark
- NHL draft: 189th overall, 2005; Columbus Blue Jackets
- Playing career: 2005–present

Kirill Olegovich Starkov (Russian: Кирилл Олегович Старков; born 31 March 1987) is a Russian-born Danish professional ice hockey forward who is currently coaching Dudingen Bulls in the Swiss MyHL league, the third tier of the Swiss hockey system. Starkov is also the Integrity Ambassador at IIHF

He has previously played for CSKA Moscow, Syracuse Crunch, Youngstown Steelhounds, Red Deer Rebels, Frölunda HC, Timrå IK, Esbjerg IK, IK Oskarshamn and HC Red Ice.

== Playing career ==
Starkov's father Oleg was also a professional hockey player who played for CSKA Moscow and Sverdlovsk Avtomobilist before moving to Denmark to play for Esbjerg IK. As a result, Kirill was born in Russia to Russian parents but spent most of his childhood in Esbjerg. After turning eighteen, Kirill applied for and received Danish citizenship, making him eligible to play for the Danish national ice hockey team. He first represented Denmark at the 2007 IIHF World Championship in Moscow, Russia.

Kirill Starkov was named Rookie of the Year of the Danish Elite League for the 2002-03 season. While playing for various junior teams for Frölunda HC, he won the Swedish Junior 18 national championships in 2004 and 2005 as well as the Swedish Junior 20 national title in 2005.

In 2014, Starkov was suspended for 4 games for breaking the etiquette rules set by the Danish Federation while playing for Esbjerg in the Danish Elite League. Kirill did not affect the match in question. But breaking the rules set by the Danish Federation gave him a 4-game suspension. He returned to the Danish National team 10 months later and played in 2 World Championships.

Starkov continued his career in Switzerland, notably at RedIce Martigny, where he, as captain of the team, led them to two semifinals. He later coached RedIce Martigny in the 2017 playoffs. Kirill also became the Swiss Div 2 Champion with HC Martigny and has now legendary status in the local area

== Career statistics ==
=== Regular season and playoffs ===
			Regular season					Playoffs
Season	Team	League	GP	G	A	Pts	PIM	GP	G	A	Pts	PIM
2002–03	Esbjerg IK	DEN	28	2	4	6	6	14	0	0	0	0
2003–04	Västra Frölunda HC	J18 Allsv	9	6	6	12	2	7	2	3	5	2
2003–04	Västra Frölunda HC	J20	25	3	10	13	4	5	2	0	2	0
2004–05	Frölunda HC	J18 Allsv	1	0	0	0	4	3	2	1	3	0
2004–05	Frölunda HC	J20	30	18	12	30	6	6	2	2	4	2
2005–06	Frölunda HC	J20	19	8	16	24	16	6	3	4	7	2
2005–06	Frölunda HC	SEL	34	1	2	3	4	—	—	—	—	—
2006–07	Red Deer Rebels	WHL	72	34	37	71	41	7	2	4	6	4
2007–08	Syracuse Crunch	AHL	20	4	4	8	4	—	—	—	—	—
2007–08	Elmira Jackals	ECHL	8	0	0	0	0	—	—	—	—	—
2007–08	Youngstown Steelhounds	CHL	25	10	12	22	0	—	—	—	—	—
2008–09	Syracuse Crunch	AHL	9	1	2	3	4	—	—	—	—	—
2008–09	CSKA Moscow	KHL	18	1	1	2	8	6	1	0	1	0
2009–10	Timrå IK	SEL	55	2	2	4	14	5	0	0	0	0
2010–11	Esbjerg fB	DEN	38	12	29	41	36	—	—	—	—	—
2011–12	Rögle BK	Allsv	39	3	12	15	12	—	—	—	—	—
2011–12	SønderjyskE	DEN	6	4	5	9	6	11	1	5	6	2
2012–13	IK Oskarshamn	Allsv	52	6	9	15	16	6	1	1	2	0
2013–14	Esbjerg Energy	DEN	31	12	33	45	20	—	—	—	—	—
2013–14	HC Red Ice	SUI.2	—	—	—	—	—	3	1	0	1	0
2014–15	HC Red Ice	SUI.2	43	10	19	29	20	8	1	1	2	4
2015–16	HC Red Ice	SUI.2	44	13	21	34	30	10	3	6	9	0
2017–18	HC Martigny	SUI.5	19	13	31	44	14	15	13	15	28	12
2019–20	HC Château-d'Œx	SUI.5	22	16	29	45	10	7	5	8	13	6
2020–21	HC Château-d'Œx	SUI.5	3	2	6	8	2	—	—	—	—	—
2021–22	HC Château-d'Œx	SUI.5	13	9	20	29	12	—	—	—	—	—
DEN totals			103	30	71	101	68	25	1	5	6	2
SEL totals			89	3	4	7	18	5	0	0	0	0
Allsv totals			91	9	21	30	28	6	1	1	2	0

=== International ===
Year	Team	Event	GP	G	A	Pts	PIM
2007	Denmark	WC	6	1	1	2	0
2009	Denmark	OGQ	3	0	0	0	0
2011	Denmark	WC	6	0	2	2	2
2012	Denmark	WC	7	0	1	1	0
2013	Denmark	OGQ	3	0	1	1	0
2013	Denmark	WC	7	1	1	2	4
2015	Denmark	WC	7	0	0	0	2
2016	Denmark	WC	8	0	0	0	0
Senior totals			47	2	6	8	8
