= Kai Lukas Münger =

Swiss ice hockey player

- Born: 26 May 2003 (age 22); Bern, Switzerland
- Height: 6 ft 0 in (183 cm)
- Weight: 194 lb (88 kg; 13 st 12 lb)
- Position: Left wing
- Shoots: Left
- SL team Former teams: HC Thurgau; HCV Martigny
- Playing career: 2023–present

Kai Lukas Münger (born 26 May 2003) is a Swiss professional ice hockey left winger who is currently playing with HC Thurgau of the Swiss League (SL).

== Playing career ==
Münger played his last junior season with Mora IK U20 team in the J20 Nationell. He appeared in 37 games, putting up 8 points (5 goals) in the 2022/23 regular season.

On June 20, 2023, Münger signed his first professional contract with HCV Martigny of the Swiss League (SL). He went on to make his professional debut with the team in the 2023-24 season, appearing in 45 regular season games and putting up 11 points (8 goals). Münger joined HC Ajoie of the National League (NL) for the remainder of the 2023-24 season. He made his NL debut with the team and would appear in 6 games before the conclusion of the regular season.

On March 28, 2024, Münger agreed to a one-year contract with HC Thurgau of the SL. On December 13, 2024, Münger was signed to an early two-year contract extension by HC Thurgau.
