= 2016–17 National League B season =

- League: National League B
- Sport: Ice hockey
- Duration: September 9, 2016 – February 12, 2017
- Number of games: 48
- Number of teams: 12

Regular Season

Playoffs
- Semi-Final champions: SC Langenthal
- Semi-Final runners-up: HC Ajoie
- Semi-Final champions: SC Rapperswil-Jona Lakers
- Semi-Final runners-up: HC La Chaux-de-Fonds

Swiss champion NLB
- Champions: SC Langenthal
- Runners-up: SC Rapperswil-Jona Lakers

National League B seasons
- ← 2015–16 2017–18 →

The 2016–17 National League B season is the 70th ice hockey season of Switzerland's second tier hockey league, the National League B.

HC Ajoie is the defending champions as they have not handed in their application for a promotion to this year's NLA season.

== Teams ==
National League B teams for the 2016–17 season

Team	City	Arena	Capacity
HC Ajoie	Porrentruy	Patinoire de Porrentruy	4,300
HC La Chaux-de-Fonds	La Chaux-de-Fonds	Patinoire des Mélèzes	7,200
GCK Lions	Küsnacht	Eishalle Küsnacht	2,200
SC Langenthal	Langenthal	Schoren Halle	4,500
EHC Olten	Olten	Kleinholz Stadion	6,500
SC Rapperswil-Jona Lakers	Rapperswil	Diners Club Arena	6,200
Red Ice	Martigny	Forum d'Octodure	4,500
HCB Ticino Rockets	Biasca	Pista Ghiaccio Biasca	3,800
Hockey Thurgau	Weinfelden	Güttingersreuti	3,200
EHC Visp	Visp	Litternahalle	4,300
EHC Winterthur	Winterthur	Zielbau Arena	3,000
EVZ Academy	Zug	Bossard Arena	7,015

== Regular season ==
The regular season started on 9 September 2016 and ended on 12 February 2017.

Pos	Team	Pld	W	OTW	OTL	L	GF	GA	GD	Pts	Qualification
1	SC Langenthal	48	32	6	2	8	181	105	+76	110	Advance to Playoffs
2	HC La Chaux-de-Fonds	48	30	3	6	9	198	137	+61	102	Advance to Playoffs
3	Red Ice	48	26	6	3	13	152	115	+37	93	Advance to Playoffs
4	SC Rapperswil-Jona Lakers	48	29	1	2	16	174	139	+35	91	Advance to Playoffs
5	EHC Olten	48	26	4	5	13	176	130	+46	91	Advance to Playoffs
6	HC Ajoie	48	24	6	2	16	202	136	+66	86	Advance to Playoffs
7	EHC Visp	48	20	2	4	22	162	159	+3	68	Advance to Playoffs
8	Hockey Thurgau	48	15	5	2	26	135	161	−26	57	Advance to Playoffs
9	EHC Winterthur	48	14	1	2	31	121	195	−74	46	
10	EVZ Academy	48	10	4	4	30	102	180	−78	42	
11	HCB Ticino Rockets	48	9	3	7	29	127	195	−68	40	
12	GCK Lions	48	9	3	5	31	106	184	−78	38	

Updated to match(es) played on 14 February 2017. Source: National League B
Rules for classification: 1) points; 2) a higher number of wins in the regular time; 3) a higher number of wins in overtime and shootouts; 4) goal difference; 5) number of goals scored; 6) drawing of lots.

== Playoffs ==
Quarter-Finals
1	SC Langenthal	4
8	Hockey Thurgau	0
2	HC La Chaux-de-Fonds	4
7	EHC Visp	1
(Pairings are reseeded after the first round)
3	Red Ice	1
6	HC Ajoie	4
4	SC Rapperswil-Jona Lakers	4
5	EHC Olten	1

Semi-Finals
1	SC Langenthal	4
6	HC Ajoie	1
2	HC La Chaux-de-Fonds	1
4	SC Rapperswil-Jona Lakers	4

Finals
1	SC Langenthal	4
4	SC Rapperswil-Jona Lakers	3

== League Qualification ==
=== HC Ambrì-Piotta vs. SC Langenthal ===
TBA; TBA	TBD	v	TBD

TBA; TBA	TBD	v	TBD

TBA; TBA	TBD	v	TBD

TBA; TBA	TBD	v	TBD

TBA; TBA	TBD	v	TBD

TBA; TBA	TBD	v	TBD

TBA; TBA	TBD	v	TBD

Series tied 0–0
