= Swiss 1. Liga =

Swiss 1. Liga may refer to:

- Swiss 1. Liga (football), fourth tier of the Swiss football league system
- Swiss 1. Liga (ice hockey), fourth tier of the Swiss ice hockey league system
- Swiss Promotion League or Swiss 1. Liga Promotion, third tier of the Swiss football league system
