= 2017–18 Swiss League season =

- League: Swiss League
- Sport: Ice hockey
- Duration: September 9, 2017 – February 12, 2018
- Number of games: 46
- Number of teams: 11

Regular Season
- Season Champions: SC Rapperswil-Jona Lakers
- Top scorer: Jonathan Hazen

Playoffs
- Semi-Final champions: SC Rapperswil-Jona Lakers
- Semi-Final runners-up: HC Ajoie
- Semi-Final champions: EHC Olten
- Semi-Final runners-up: SC Langenthal

Swiss League champion
- Champions: SC Rapperswil-Jona Lakers
- Runners-up: EHC Olten

Swiss League seasons
- ← 2016–17 2018–19 →

The 2017–18 Swiss League season was the 71st ice hockey season of Switzerland's second tier hockey league. It was the first season completed as the rebranded Swiss League.

== Teams ==
Swiss League teams for the 2017–18 season

Team	City	Arena	Capacity
HC Ajoie	Porrentruy	Patinoire de Porrentruy	4,300
HC La Chaux-de-Fonds	La Chaux-de-Fonds	Patinoire des Mélèzes	7,200
GCK Lions	Küsnacht	Eishalle Küsnacht	2,200
SC Langenthal	Langenthal	Schoren Halle	4,500
EHC Olten	Olten	Kleinholz Stadion	6,500
SC Rapperswil-Jona Lakers	Rapperswil	Diners Club Arena	6,200
Hockey Thurgau	Weinfelden	Güttingersreuti	3,200
HCB Ticino Rockets	Biasca	Pista Ghiaccio Biasca	3,800
EHC Visp	Visp	Litternahalle	4,300
EHC Winterthur	Winterthur	Zielbau Arena	3,000
EVZ Academy	Zug	Bossard Arena	7,015

== Regular season ==
The regular season started on 9 September 2017 and ended on 12 February 2018.

Pos	Team	Pld	W	OTW	OTL	L	GF	GA	GD	Pts	Qualification
1	SC Rapperswil-Jona Lakers	46	33	3	2	8	178	81	+97	107	Advance to Playoffs
2	EHC Olten	46	19	11	1	15	132	120	+12	80	Advance to Playoffs
3	SC Langenthal	48	25	8	4	11	161	109	+52	95	Advance to Playoffs
4	HC Ajoie	46	22	3	7	14	168	130	+38	79	Advance to Playoffs
5	EHC Visp	46	19	5	6	16	129	113	+16	73	Advance to Playoffs
6	Hockey Thurgau	46	23	3	3	17	139	125	+14	78	Advance to Playoffs
7	HC La Chaux-de-Fonds	46	22	5	4	15	169	132	+37	80	Advance to Playoffs
8	EVZ Academy	46	16	4	3	23	139	177	−38	59	Advance to Playoffs
9	GCK Lions	46	13	6	3	24	130	179	−49	54	
10	EHC Winterthur	46	7	1	11	27	109	194	−85	34	
11	HCB Ticino Rockets	46	6	1	4	35	68	162	−94	24	

Updated to match(es) played on 12 February 2018. Source: Swiss League
Rules for classification: 1) points; 2) a higher number of wins in the regular time; 3) a higher number of wins in overtime and shootouts; 4) goal difference; 5) number of goals scored; 6) drawing of lots.

=== Statistics ===
==== Scoring leaders ====
The following shows the top ten players who led the league in points, at the conclusion of the regular season. If two or more skaters are tied (i.e. same number of points, goals and played games), all of the tied skaters are shown.

Player	Team	GP	G	A	Pts	+/–	PIM
(Canada) Jonathan Hazen	HC Ajoie	46	28	44	72	+19	40
(Canada) Philip-Michael Devos	HC Ajoie	46	26	45	71	+23	12
(Canada) Brent Kelly	SC Langenthal	46	29	37	66	+21	28
(Switzerland) Stefan Tschannen	SC Langenthal	43	21	36	57	+17	28
(Canada) Dominic Forget	HC La Chaux-de-Fonds	46	30	21	51	+9	22
(Canada) Jaedon Descheneau	Hockey Thurgau	41	18	32	50	+12	28
(Canada) Dion Knelsen	SC Rapperswil-Jona Lakers	42	27	21	48	+18	24
(Canada) Cameron Braes	Hockey Thurgau	45	25	22	47	+11	24
(United States) Ryan Hayes	GCK Lions	45	16	31	47	-3	81
(Switzerland) Léonardo Fuhrer	HC Ajoie	46	21	25	46	+15	20

==== Leading goaltenders ====
The following shows the top five goaltenders who led the league in goals against average, provided that they have played at least 40% of their team's minutes, at the conclusion of the regular season.

Player	Team(s)	GP	TOI	GA	Sv%	GAA
(Switzerland) Melvin Nyffeler	SC Rapperswil-Jona Lakers	43	2552:16	70	93.58	1.65
(Switzerland) Reto Lory	EHC Visp	33	1929:59	68	92.51	2.11
(Switzerland) Marco Mathis	SC Langenthal	36	2062:40	79	90.81	2.30
(Switzerland) Dominic Nyffeler	HC Ajoie	34	1962:23	80	92.10	2.45
(Switzerland) Simon Rytz	EHC Olten	24	1380:49	57	92.31	2.48

== Playoffs ==
Quarter-Finals
1	SCRJ Lakers	4
8	EVZ Academy	0
2	SC Langenthal	4
7	EHC Visp	2
(Pairings are reseeded after the first round)
3	EHC Olten	4
6	HC Thurgau	2
4	HC La Chaux-de-Fonds	1
5	HC Ajoie	4

Semi-Finals
1	SCRJ Lakers	4
5	HC Ajoie	2
2	SC Langenthal	1
3	EHC Olten	4

Finals
1	SCRJ Lakers	4
3	EHC Olten	1

== League Qualification ==
=== EHC Kloten vs. SC Rapperswil-Jona Lakers ===
12 April 2018; 20:15	EHC Kloten	1–4 (0–1, 0–1, 1–2)	SC Rapperswil-Jona Lakers

Game reference

14 April 2018; 20:15	SC Rapperswil-Jona Lakers	4–0 (1–0, 1–0, 2–0)	EHC Kloten

Game reference

17 April 2018; 20:15	EHC Kloten	3–2 OT (0–1, 1–0, 1–1, 0–0, 0–0, 1–0)	SC Rapperswil-Jona Lakers

Game reference

19 April 2018; 20:!5	SC Rapperswil-Jona Lakers	0–4 (0–2, 0–2, 0–0)	EHC Kloten

Game reference

21 April 2018; 20:15	EHC Kloten	4–3 OT (2–0, 0–3, 1–0, 1–0)	SC Rapperswil-Jona Lakers

Game reference

23 April 2018; 20:15	SC Rapperswil-Jona Lakers	2–1 (1–0, 1–1, 0–0)	EHC Kloten

Game reference

25 April 2018; 20:15	EHC Kloten	1–2 OT (0–1, 0–0, 1–0, 0–1)	SC Rapperswil-Jona Lakers

Game reference

SC Rapperswil-Jona Lakers wins Series 4–3
