= HC Valais-Chablais =

Swiss professional ice hockey team

- City: Martigny, Switzerland
- League: MyHockey League
- Founded: 2018
- Home arena: Forum d'Octodure
- Colors
- Owner(s): Patrick Polli
- General manager: Victor Liebenguth
- Head coach: Daniele Marghitola
- Captain: Melvin Merola
- Website: hcv.ch

HC Valais-Chablais is a Swiss ice hockey team who play in Martigny in the canton of Valais. They currently play in the MyHockey League (MyHL) since the 2024–25 season, the third tier of the ice hockey leagues in Switzerland, behind the National League and Swiss League.

== History ==
The HC Valais-Chablais was founded on May 8, 2018 by the merger of HC Sion, HC Red Ice, HC Nendaz, HC Verbier and HC Monthey. This merger brings together 500 players of 24 different teams from junior level to the MySports League (MSL). The main team plays in Martigny in MSL. The second team plays in 1. Liga in Sion. 4 other Senior teams also play in Sion, Monthey, Nendaz and Verbier.

On December 5, 2018, to better assert a regional identity, the teams were renamed according to the location of their ice rink, HC Valais-Chablais 1 was renamed HCV Martigny.

In the 2022-23 season, HCV Martigny won the National Cup and the championship, obtaining promotion to SL.

== Honors ==
- National Cup : 2023
- MyHockey League : 2023
