= Forum d'Octodure =

Arena in Martigny, Switzerland

Coordinates: 46.09738°N 7.07304°E

- Interactive map of Forum d'Octodure
- Location: Martigny, Switzerland
- Owner: Municipality of Martigny
- Operator: Forum d'Octodure SA
- Capacity: 4,500

Construction
- Groundbreaking: 1955
- Opened: 1955
- Cost: 400'000 CHF
- Architect: Raymond Métral

Tenant
- HCV Martigny (MyHL) (2018–present)

Forum d'Octodure is an arena in Martigny, Switzerland. It is primarily used for ice hockey and is the home arena of Valais-Chablais HC. Forum d'Octodure was opened in 1955. In 1982, a roof was built and the rink became covered.

== History ==
During the summer of 1955, the idea of creating the first artificial ice rink in Valais was proposed. Martigny HC, freshly promoted to the NLB, obtained the support of the Municipality of Martigny for the construction of its ice rink. With the evolution of cooling techniques, what would have cost 1 million CHF 10 years ago could be achieved for 250,000 CHF. The Municipality agreed to support the project. The location, an 8,000 m^{2} (86,000-square-foot) plot of land on the edge of the city, next to the football stadium and the swimming pool, was offered by the Maison du Grand-Saint-Bernard. The architect, Raymond Métral, planned a 60 by 30 metres (197 ft × 98 ft) playing surface, cooled by a 21 km (13-mile) ammonia circuit. He planned to build 5 stands that could accommodate 2,000 people, a canteen, locker rooms and an equipment room.

Work began on August 21. After flattening the surface and pouring a first slab, the 21 km (13 miles) of pipes, aligned every 8 cm (3.1 in) over the entire surface, were welded. On November 15, the floating slab was poured and it was determined that the ice rink would be operational at the beginning of December. On November 18, 1955, the board of directors of the Patinoire de Martigny SA was founded. Jean-Maurice Gross was elected president, Adrien Morand vice-president, and Paul Forstel secretary; the other members were Pierre Crettex, Angelo Visentini, Jean Bollin and Paul Marti. In the end, the construction cost around 400,000 CHF. On December 3 and 4, the ice rink was officially inaugurated with two matches, one against Servette HC, lost 10-7, and one between Lausanne HC and a Martigny-Servette selection, won 16-12. The ceremony continued at the Kluser Hotel, where the president of the Municipality welcomed representatives of the Swiss hockey league.

In 1981, the municipal authorities decided to provide the ice rink with a roof. With a budget of 1,325,000 CHF, Michel Jacquérioz was chosen as the architect of the project. Although there were many arguments in favor of the project, such as the reduction in maintenance costs and the increase in the operating time of the ice, many opponents argued that the study of this project was carried out very quickly, without other alternative proposals. The proposal was accepted by a vote of 29 to 27. The work, scheduled for the beginning of June, began in mid-July, following some administrative delays. Roman Baths were discovered during the earthworks, which delayed the project a little and forced the architect to find a solution to preserve them. By installing support pillars and raising the slab by 60 cm (24 inches), thus making it possible to visit these historical remains, he obtained authorization to continue the work. These delays forced Martigny HC to play their home games elsewhere, and they came to an agreement with Monthey HC to use their ice rink. At the end of November, the new changing rooms and stands were built and work on the roof began with the installation of the metal frame. Despite the progress of the work, some opponents tried to file a final appeal, which was not taken into consideration by the authorities.

By mid-December it was decided that, although the building work was still in progress, games could resume since the ice had been created. Martigny HC hosted Genève-Servette HC for its first home match of the season on December 16, 1981. In mid-January, when the roof covering work was already well advanced, an inspector from the worker protection office stopped the work: the safety conditions were insufficient for work at a height of 17 m (56 ft) and a protective net was required in order to protect workers from a fall and skaters, using the ice below, from any falling objects. After installing this protection system, work resumed and, on February 12, 1982, the last plate covering the ice rink was installed.

In 1987, following the promotion of Martigny HC to the NLB, the club had to renovate its ice rink to meet the league's requirements. Christian Constantin was chosen as the architect. The project planned to demolish the canteen to make 6 changing rooms and additional stands, and add a restaurant that could accommodate 180 people. The new capacity of the ice rink was planned to be 5,500 people and the expected cost for this work was 2,850,000 CHF. In July 1988, a central clock was also installed in the center of the rink and the rink was renamed Forum d'Octodure.

In 2003, the municipality had to change the cooling system of the ice rink, which had been installed in 1955, since environmental standards no longer allowed the use of that much ammonia. 1,700,000 CHF were planned to renovate this system. Armand Debons, the architect for this project, proposed a Glycol-based solution, and the new system was operational in September 2004.

== See also ==
- List of indoor arenas in Switzerland
