= Dino Kessler =

Swiss ice hockey player

- Born: December 23, 1966 (age 58); Chur, Switzerland
- Height: 6 ft 0 in (183 cm)
- Weight: 198 lb (90 kg; 14 st 2 lb)
- Position: Defence
- Shot: Left
- NLB team Former teams: EHC Basel; NLA; EHC Chur; EV Zug; Genève-Servette HC
- National team: Switzerland
- Playing career: 1984–2005

Dino Kessler (born December 23, 1966) is sports journalist and a former Swiss professional ice hockey defenceman. He last played for EHC Basel in Switzerland's National League B.

Kessler has participated as a member of the Swiss national team in numerous international tournaments, including the 1992 Winter Olympics.

== Playing career ==
Dino Kessler began his career at HC Chur in the mid-1980s. In 1990, he joined EV Zug. An aggressive defender, he played there for ten years, with a one-season break at CP Berne. With Zug, he obtained his only Swiss championship title in 1998.

In 1992, he participated in the 1992 Winter Olympics.

In 2001, he left for Genève-Servette HC which played in LNB. The following season, he participated with Geneva in the playoffs for the title against CP Berne. During the game he was injured in the neck following a charge by Bernese defender Rolf Ziegler.

In the spring of 2003, he was announced as a new recruit for HC Basel. During the 2004-2005 season, he only played eight matches due to a shoulder injury and a damaged knee. He ended his playing career at the end of season.

== Journalistic career ==
Since his retirement from ice hockey in 2005, Kessler is a sports journalist at Blick.
