= Regio League =

- Sport: Ice hockey
- Founded: 1999
- Founder: Schweizerischer Eishockeyverband
- No. of teams: about 300
- Country: Switzerland
- Most recent champion: HC Sion-Nendaz 4 Vallées (Swiss 1. Liga)
- Related competitions: National League Swiss League MySports League
- Website: Regio League

The Regio League (RL) is the amateur championship of ice hockey in Switzerland. Organized by the Swiss Ice Hockey Association, it consists of the 1. Liga, 2. Liga, 3. Liga, and 4. Liga, which make up the 4th, 5th, 6th and 7th levels of Swiss ice hockey respectively.
