= Ken Baumgartner =

Canadian ice hockey player (born 1966)

- Born: March 11, 1966 (age 60) Flin Flon, Manitoba, Canada
- Height: 6 ft 1 in (185 cm)
- Weight: 205 lb (93 kg; 14 st 9 lb)
- Position: Left wing
- Shot: Left
- Played for: Los Angeles Kings; New York Islanders; Toronto Maple Leafs; Mighty Ducks of Anaheim; Boston Bruins
- NHL draft: 245th overall, 1985; Buffalo Sabres
- Playing career: 1987–1999

Kenneth James Baumgartner (born March 11, 1966) is a Canadian former professional ice hockey left winger who played in the National Hockey League for twelve seasons.

== Biography ==
Baumgartner played junior hockey for the Prince Albert Raiders of the Western Hockey League and minor league hockey for the New Haven Nighthawks of the American Hockey League as well as one season for EHC Chur of the Swiss League. He has Swiss citizenship and played there as a non-import player. With the Prince Albert Raiders, he was selected to the league's All-Scholastic Team in 1984 and won a Memorial Cup in 1985.

Drafted 245th overall by the Buffalo Sabres in the 1985 NHL entry draft, Baumgartner made his NHL debut with the Los Angeles Kings during the 1987–88 season. A defenseman until he reached the NHL, he would go on to play for the New York Islanders, Toronto Maple Leafs, Mighty Ducks of Anaheim and the Boston Bruins until his retirement in 2000. Baumgartner's primary role was an enforcer and in his 12 NHL seasons, he tallied 2242 penalty minutes in 696 regular season games. He recorded 13 goals and 41 assists for 54 career points. He is the only player in the history of the NHL to play a full 82-game season and record only 1 point.

Throughout his playing career, Baumgartner attended Long Island's Hofstra University during offseasons, where he earned a degree in business and finance.

In 1994, while still a member of the Maple Leafs, Baumgartner was elected vice president of the NHL Players Association. Here, he played a role in establishing the collective bargaining agreement between the NHLPA and the NHL during the 1994–95 season.

Following his retirement as a player, Baumgartner joined the coaching staff of the Bruins as an assistant coach for the 1999–2000 season, before attending an MBA program through Harvard University. His daughter Alexa was also a player at the East Coast Wizards, having played on both U14 Major and U16 Major teams. She later played for Bowdoin College's field hockey team.

== Career statistics ==
			Regular Season					Playoffs
Season	Team	League	GP	G	A	Pts	PIM	GP	G	A	Pts	PIM
1983–84	Prince Albert Raiders	WHL	57	1	6	7	203	4	0	0	0	23
1984–85	Prince Albert Raiders	WHL	60	3	9	12	252	13	1	3	4	89
1984–85	Prince Albert Raiders	M-Cup	—	—	—	—	—	4	0	0	0	80
1985–86	Prince Albert Raiders	WHL	70	4	23	27	277	20	3	9	12	112
1986–87	EHC Chur	NDA	36	2	3	5	85	—	—	—	—	—
1986–87	New Haven Nighthawks	AHL	13	0	3	3	99	6	0	0	0	60
1987–88	Los Angeles Kings	NHL	30	2	3	5	189	5	0	0	0	28
1987–88	New Haven Nighthawks	AHL	48	1	5	6	181	—	—	—	—	—
1988–89	Los Angeles Kings	NHL	49	1	3	4	286	5	0	0	0	8
1988–89	New Haven Nighthawks	AHL	10	1	3	4	26	—	—	—	—	—
1989–90	Los Angeles Kings	NHL	12	1	0	1	28	—	—	—	—	—
1989–90	New York Islanders	NHL	53	0	5	5	194	4	0	0	0	27
1990–91	New York Islanders	NHL	78	1	6	7	282	—	—	—	—	—
1991–92	New York Islanders	NHL	44	0	1	1	202	—	—	—	—	—
1991–92	Toronto Maple Leafs	NHL	11	0	0	0	23	—	—	—	—	—
1992–93	Toronto Maple Leafs	NHL	63	1	0	1	155	7	1	0	1	0
1993–94	Toronto Maple Leafs	NHL	64	4	4	8	185	10	0	0	0	18
1994–95	Toronto Maple Leafs	NHL	2	0	0	0	5	—	—	—	—	—
1995–96	Toronto Maple Leafs	NHL	60	2	3	5	152	—	—	—	—	—
1995–96	Mighty Ducks of Anaheim	NHL	12	0	1	1	41	—	—	—	—	—
1996–97	Mighty Ducks of Anaheim	NHL	67	0	11	11	182	11	0	1	1	11
1997–98	Boston Bruins	NHL	82	0	1	1	199	6	0	0	0	14
1998–99	Boston Bruins	NHL	69	1	3	4	119	3	0	0	0	0
NHL totals			696	13	41	54	2,242	51	1	2	3	106

== See also ==
- List of NHL players with 2000 career penalty minutes

== In popular culture ==
- Letterkenny (TV Show) S2:E6 - name of stud candidate for Wayne's dog Stormy
