= EHC Chur =

- Nickname: Steinböcke (The Capricorns)
- City: Chur, Switzerland
- League: Swiss League
- Founded: 1933
- Home arena: Thomas Domenig Stadion (capacity 6,500)
- Colours
- General manager: Roger Lüdi
- Head coach: Reto von Arx
- Captain: Daniel Carbis
- Affiliates: SCL Tigers
- Website: www.ehc.ch

Franchise history
- 2000–2008: EHC Chur Sport AG
- 2008–2015: EHC Chur Capricorns
- 2015–present: EHC Chur

EHC Chur (formerly EHC Chur Sport AG) is a Swiss professional ice hockey team based in Chur, Switzerland. The club currently plays in the Swiss League (SL). Its home arena is the 6,500-seat Thomas Domenig Stadion.

The team played in the National League B (today's Swiss League) until 2008 before returning to lower leagues for financial reasons. It eventually returned to semi-professional hockey in the third tiered MyHockey League (MHL). The team won the 2023-24 MHL title and achieved promotion to the Swiss League for the 2024-25 season.

== Honors ==
- National League B Champions 1998–99, 1999–00
- Swiss Regio Champions 2002–03

== Players ==
=== Notable alumni ===
- Ken Baumgartner
- Renato Tosio
- Thomas Vrabec
- Harijs Vītoliņš
- David Aebischer
- Marco Bührer
- Tobias Stephan
- Wes Walz
- Nino Niederreiter
- Paul DiPietro
- Mika Strömberg
- Leonīds Tambijevs
- Mauro Jörg
- Edgar Salis
- Dino Kessler
- Enzo Corvi
- Rico Gredig
