= EVZ Academy =

- City: Zug, Switzerland
- League: Swiss League; 2016–2022
- Founded: 2016
- Dissolved: 2022
- Home arena: Academy Arena
- Colors
- General manager: Reto Kläy
- Head coach: Roger Hansson
- Affiliates: EV Zug
- Website: hockeyacademy.ch

Franchise history
- 2016–present: EVZ Academy

EVZ Academy was a Swiss professional ice hockey team who play in Zug, Switzerland. They have played since the 2016–17 season in the Swiss League (SL), the second tier of the main professional ice hockey league in Switzerland, behind the National League, it was the primary affiliate to EV Zug.

== History ==
The club name is derived from Zug's junior program "The Hockey Academy" and was founded with the purpose to serve as an affiliate club to shareholder and National League club, EV Zug. They submitted an application to play in the National League B and were permitted to play in the 2016–17 season.

EVZ Academy plays its home games in the Zug's training rink, Academy Arena, as well as occasionally in the Bossard Arena, home to EV Zug. In their debut season, EVZ Academy collected just 10 wins in 48 games to finish in 10th place.

In the 2018–19 season, Jason O'Leary replaced inaugural head coach Stefan Hedlund, who was promoted to EV Zug's coaching staff. Having won the Swiss League in 2017 with SC Langenthal, O'Leary led Academy to their second playoff berth, claiming 8th position before losing to regular season champions HC La Chaux-de-Fonds.

At the conclusion of the season, O'Leary left to coach top flight DEL club Iserlohn Roosters, and he was replaced by Roger Hansson, as Academy's third head coach.

After the 2021–22 season, EVZ Academy was dissolved, as EV Zug could not comply with the new regulations of the Swiss League AG and thus withdrew it. In the future, the EVZ will focus mainly on the U16 to U20 range. By 2022, EVZ Academy had released 50 players, 16 of whom played in the National League in the 2021/22 season and another 22 players in other Swiss League teams.
