= Jason O'Leary =

Canadian professional ice hockey coach (born 1978)

Jason O’Leary (born August 17, 1978) is a Canadian professional ice hockey coach.

== Career ==
Born in Fredericton, New Brunswick, O’Leary played ice hockey at St. Thomas University in his hometown of Fredericton. Upon graduation, he worked as a teacher in Alberta and later in British Columbia, while coaching the respective schools’ ice hockey teams. He then also worked in Hockey Canada’s High Performance Program at the U16 and U17 level.

In 2009, he accepted the position as head coach of the Okanagan Hockey Academy in St. Pölten, Austria. During his time in Austria, O’Leary also served as head coach of the country's Men's U18 & U20 teams. and U20 national teams.

He moved to Switzerland prior to the 2013–14 season, joining the coaching staff of SC Langenthal of the second-tier division National League B (NLB) as an assistant. When Olivier Horak stepped down in December 2014, O’Leary took over the head coaching job at SCL. In the 2016–17 season, he led the team to the NLB title, beating the SC Rapperswil-Jona Lakers in the finals. He parted ways with Langenthal after the conclusion of the season and was named assistant coach at National League A club Genève-Servette HC on May 19, 2017.

On May 31, 2018, O'Leary was named head coach of the EVZ Academy, the farm team of EV Zug. He took over the head coaching job of German DEL side Iserlohn Roosters in March 2019. O'Leary was relieved of his duties in February 2021 after losing seven of the previous nine games. The week before, it was announced that he would serve as head coach of Swiss side SCL Tigers from the beginning of the 2021–22 season. He was released on January 16, 2022, following seven consecutive losses.

On December 23, 2022, O'Leary was named head coach of the Ducs d'Angers of the French Ligue Magnus. In January 2022, guided the team to a second-place finish in the Continental Cup.
