= Swiss Ice Hockey Federation =

Ice hockey governing body in Switzerland

Switzerland
- Association name: Swiss Ice Hockey Federation
- IIHF Code: SUI
- Founded: 27 September 1908
- IIHF membership: 23 November 1908
- President: Stefan Schärer
- IIHF men's ranking: 7
- IIHF women's ranking: 6

The Swiss Ice Hockey Federation (SIHF) (German: Schweizerischer Eishockeyverband (SEHV), French: Ligue Suisse de Hockey sur Glace (LSHG), Italian: Federazione Svizzera di hockey su ghiaccio ) is the governing body of ice hockey in Switzerland, as recognized by the International Ice Hockey Federation (IIHF). It was founded in 1908 and is a founding member of the IIHF. It manages both the amateur and professional games in Switzerland, as well as the national teams on junior and senior levels.

Youth coach Markus Graf created the "Foundation, Talent, Elite, Mastery" program adopted as the SIHF mantra. He also created the "swissmadehockey" guidelines for training junior hockey players, which then formed the approach to training the Switzerland men's national ice hockey team.

== See also ==
- Ice Hockey World Championships
- Switzerland men's national ice hockey team
- Switzerland women's national ice hockey team
- National League, top tier men's league
- Swiss League, second tier men's league
- Regio League (Swiss 1. liga)
- Women's League (SWHL A)
- Swiss Cup
