= Eishalle Herti =

Sports arena in Zug, Switzerland

Coordinates: 47.175833°N 8.508056°E

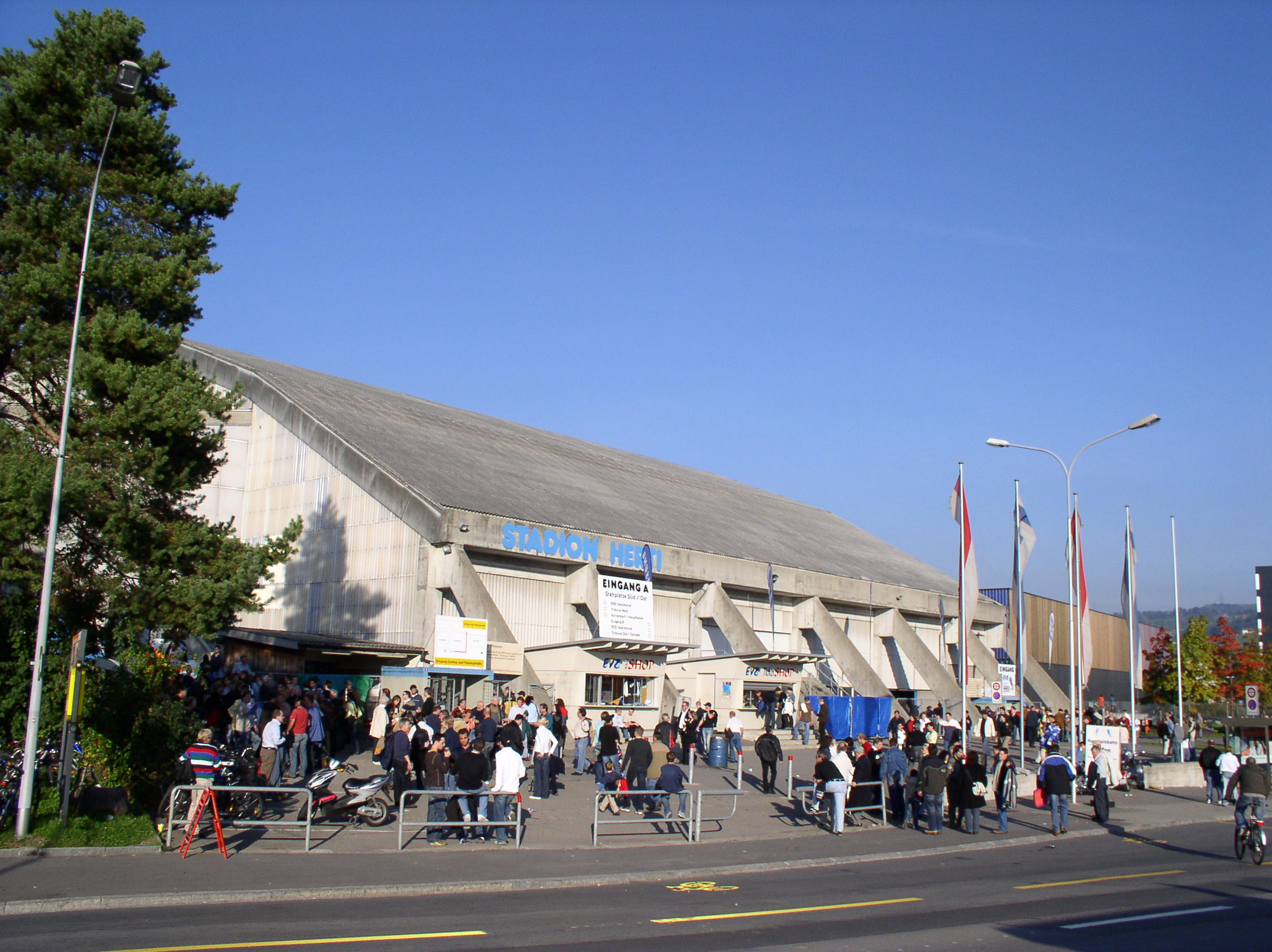
Eishalle Herti

Eishalle Herti was an indoor sporting arena located in Zug, Switzerland. It was opened on 26 November 1967. The capacity of the arena was 6,780. It was the home arena of the EV Zug ice hockey team. In May 2010, it was demolished and replaced by the newly built Bossard Arena.
