= HC Martigny =

- City: Martigny, Switzerland
- League: National League B
- Founded: 1939
- Folded: 2008
- Home arena: Forum d'Octodure
- Colors: White and red
- Head coach: Stefan Nussberger

HC Martigny was a Swiss professional ice hockey team, and played in the Swiss National League B. It merged with HC Verbier Val-de-Bagnes in 2008, to form HC Red Ice.

Founded: 1939
Home arena: Forum d'Octodure (capacity 4,500)
Swiss Championships won: 0
National League B Championships won: 0
