= SC Langenthal =

- City: Langenthal, Switzerland
- League: MyHockey League
- Founded: 1946
- Home arena: Schoren Halle
- Colors
- General manager: Kevin Schläpfer
- Head coach: Jeff Campbell
- Captain: Stefan Tschannen
- Website: sclangenthal.ch

Franchise history
- 1946–present: SC Langenthal

Schlittschuh Club Langenthal known as SC Langenthal is a Swiss amateur ice hockey team that currently competes in the third tier, MyHockey League. They played in the Swiss League, the second tier of the main professional ice hockey league in Switzerland, from 2001 to 2023. In 2012, 2017 and 2019 the team has won the Swiss League title. The club withdrew from professional hockey following the 2022–23 season.

== History ==
In the 2001–02 season, SC Langenthal succeeded as Swiss amateur champion in the Regio league to gain promotion to the second-tiered National League B. In the 2002–03 season, the team won six wins and five draws and reached the tenth place. In the following season, the team reached the play-offs for the first time. In the semi-final, the team dropped out against EHC Basel.

In the 2011–12 season, SC Langenthal finished the regular season in second place behind Lausanne HC. In the quarter-final, the playoff against EHC Basel, SCL prevailed with 4–0 series victory and qualified for the first time in six years for the semi-finals. In a seven game series win over HC La Chaux-de-Fonds, SC Langenthal won the decisive seventh game 2–1 in their home arena at the Schoren in front of 3,741 spectators thanks to goals from Noël Guyazand and Jeff Campbell. In the play-off final, SC Langenthal met the Lausanne HC. After two losses at the beginning of the series Langenthal won 4 consecutive games and for the first time in club history became claimed National League B Championship. In the National League A qualification against HC Ambrì-Piotta, they were defeated decisively 1–4 to continue in the NLB.

In the 2012–13 season, SC Langenthal again finished second in qualifying. In the playoff quarter-final, SCL swept the GCK Lions with a 4–0 series win. In the semi-final, the SCL failed to defend their title in a 2–4 series defeat to local rivals EHC Olten.

Langenthal returned to the heights of the NLB in the 2016–17 season, winning the championship for the second time in its history. In the final, under the guidance of head coach Jason O'Leary, SCL claimed 4–3 victory against SC Rapperswil-Jona Lakers. Similarly to their first NLB title, Langenthal faced the same fate against HC Ambri-Piotta in the National League Qualifiers with 0–4 series sweep.

With Head coach O'Leary leaving the club after their successful season, he was succeeded by Swede Per Hånberg. In the 2017–18 season, the team reached the second place in the qualification. The desired final could not be achieved, advancing after a winning quarter-final series against the EHC Visp (4–2) before suffering defeat in the semi-final against the EHC Olten in 5 games.

Hånberg led the team in the spring of 2019 to win the Swiss League championship title. In the final against HC La Chaux-de-Fonds, which had previously won the qualification, using a strong defensive games, they comprehensively defeated the regular season leaders with a 4–0 series victory. This was the third championship title in the country's second-highest division in the club's history.

== Honors ==
Swiss League Championships: (3) 2012, 2017, 2019
