= Minor ice hockey =

Amateur ice hockey which is played below the junior age level

Minor ice hockey or minor hockey is an umbrella term for amateur ice hockey which is played below the junior age level. Players are classified by age, with each age group playing in its own league. The rules, especially as it relates to body contact, vary from class to class. In North America, the rules are governed by the national bodies, Hockey Canada and USA Hockey, while local hockey associations administer players and leagues for their region. Many provinces and states organize regional and provincial championship tournaments, and the highest age groups in Canada and the United States also participate in national championships.

Minor hockey is not to be confused with minor league professional hockey.

== Canada ==
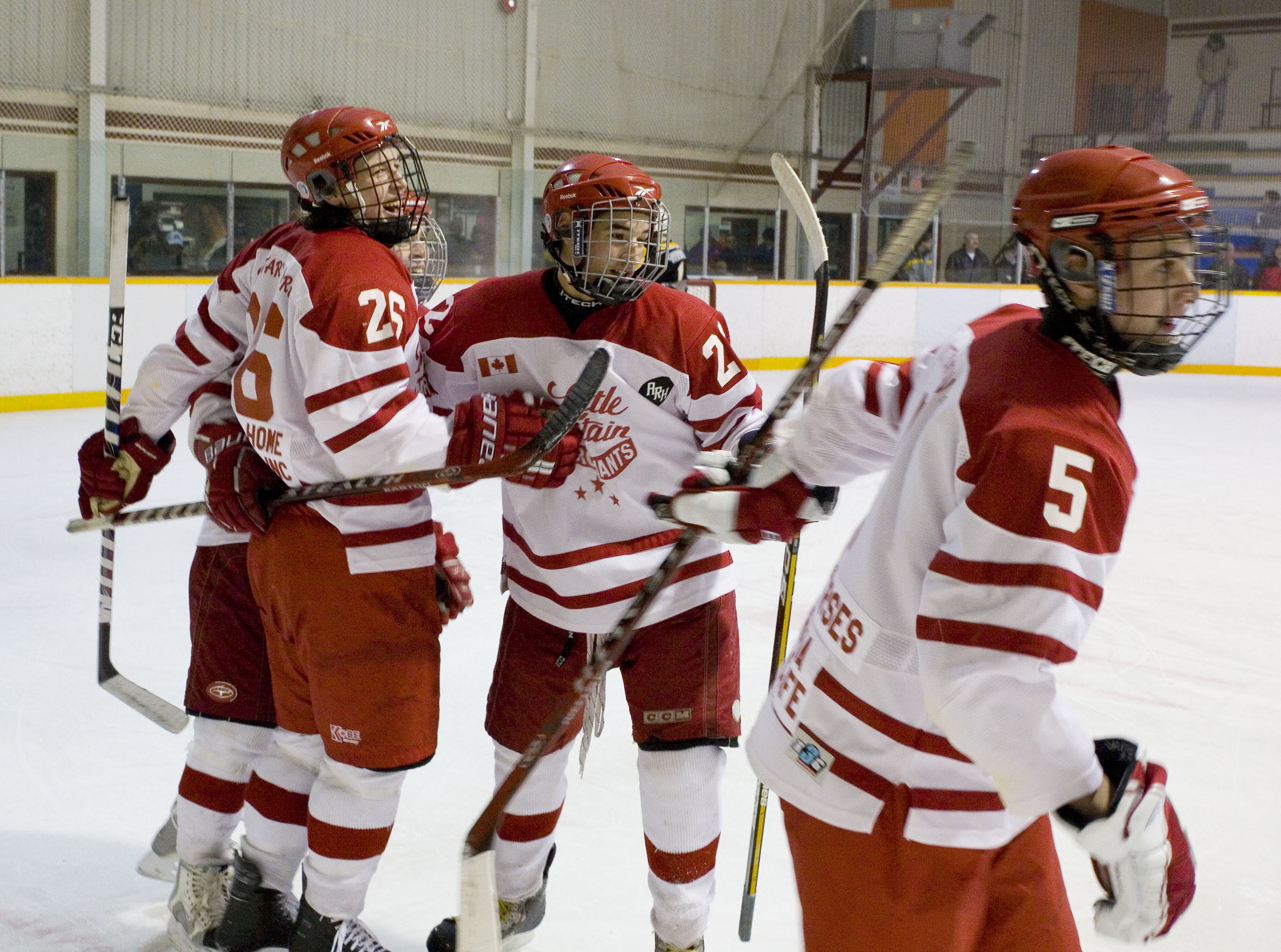
Minor hockey players in Kawartha Lakes, Ontario, celebrate the third goal of the game in Central Ontario Junior C Hockey League action

In Canada, the age categories are designated by each provincial hockey governing body based on Hockey Canada's guidelines, and each category may have multiple tiers based on skill.

In November 2019, Hockey Canada announced that beginning in 2020 (officially taking effect in the 2020–21 season), it would refer to its age categories by their age limits (with "midget" being renamed "U18", for example) rather than by names. It stated that the new names would be more concise, while there had also been concerns over use of the term "midget" in this context—as the word is now considered a pejorative towards dwarfism.

=== Age categories ===
To qualify in a category, the player must be under the age limit as of December 31 of the current season.

- U7 (formerly Initiation, Mini Mite, Tyke or H1/H2, Pre-MAHG (Méthode d'apprentissage de hockey sur glace), MAHG 1 and 2): under 7 years of age In some larger areas with multiple associations in close proximity, Tyke is broken up by age into U6 (minor U7 or H1) for 5-year-old players and U7 (major U7, major tyke, orH2) for 6 years old players. In the Province of Quebec, players start in Pre-MAHG to initiate skating techniques. Over the next two following years they are in levels MAHG 1 and MAHG 2 to develop a sense of the game.
- U9 (formerly Novice or Mite or H3/H4 or MAHG3/MAHG4): under 9 years of age In some larger areas, U9 is broken up by age into U8 (minor U9 or minor novice or H3) for 7-year-old players and U9 (major U9 or H4 or major novice) for 8-year-old players.
- U11 (formerly Atom): under 11 years of age
- U13 (formerly Peewee): under 13 years of age
- U15 (formerly Bantam): under 15 years of age
- U18 (formerly Midget): under 18 years of age Many provinces have U16 or minor Midget leagues that are for 15-year-old players and major midget for 16 to 17-year-old players.
- Junior: under 20 years of age Junior: divided into Major Junior (WHL, OHL and QMJHL), Junior A (Tier II Junior), Junior B and Junior C (in some locations).
- Senior: No age limit

== Finland ==
In Finland, the Finnish Ice Hockey Association roughly categorizes youth ice hockey players to under school-age and school-age. Players over 16 are considered juniors, although the youngest juniors are still at the school-age.

Ahead of the 2020-21 season, the names of the minor and junior age groups were changed to the to represent the standards used in international competitions and other youth ice hockey leagues.

There is one league level each for the U9 (previously F2) and U10 (F1) age groups, called the Leijonaliiga ('Lion League'), and one league level each for the U11 (E2) and U12 (E1) age groupsl, called sarja ('series,' usage analogous to 'league'). For all U12 and younger age groups, teams are sorted into closed groups of six to twenty teams in which teams exclusively play one another throughout the season; groups are formed from teams within a certain geographic area, in addition to other factors, thus creating the broad variability in number of teams per group.

The U13 (D2), U14 (D1), and U15 (C2) age groups use the A–AA–AAA system common to North America, in which AAA is the highest league level, followed by AA and A.

Listed below are the minor and junior leagues with the old age group designations in parentheses:

- U9 (F2): Leijonaliiga
- U10 (F1): Leijonaliiga
- U11 (E2): sarja
- U12 (E1): sarja
- U13 (D2): A – AA – AAA
- U14 (D1): A – AA – AAA
- U15 (C2): A – AA – AAA
- U16 (C1): Mestis – SM-sarja
- U17 (B2): alempi – ylempi
- U18 (B): Mestis – SM-sarja
- U19 (new age group): alempi – ylempi
- U20 (Nuorten, ('Junior') or A): Mestis – SM-sarja
- U22 (new age group): alempi – ylemp

== France ==
In France, hockey teams use the following levels:

- Moustiques (age 9 and younger)
- Poussins (ages 10–11)
- Benjamins (ages 12–13)
- Minimes (ages 14–15)
- Cadets (ages 16–17)
- Espoirs (ages 18–20)

== Germany ==
In Germany, German Ice Hockey Federation designates the following levels:

- U7 (ages 7 and younger)
- U9 (ages 9 and younger)
- U11 (ages 11 and younger)
- U13 (ages 13 and younger)
- U15 (ages 15 and younger)
- U17 (ages 17 and younger)
- U20 (ages 20 and younger)

== Sweden ==
The Swedish Ice Hockey Federation designates the following levels:

- U9 (ages 9 and younger)
- U10 (ages 10 and younger)
- U11 (ages 11 and younger)
- U12 (ages 12 and younger)
- U13 (ages 13 and younger)
- U14 (ages 14 and younger)
- U15 (ages 15 and younger)
- U16 (ages 16 and younger)
- J18 (Juniors 18 and younger)
- J20 (Juniors 20 and younger)

Some levels (especially J18 and J20) are directly administered by the Swedish Ice Hockey Federation, while lower divisions of the Juniors and below are administered by the respective sub-federation in each landskap.

== Switzerland ==
The Swiss Ice Hockey Federation designates the following levels : using terms from the national languages of Switzerland. This has nevertheless evolve recently to U9, U11 so this has to be updated.

- Bambini (ages 6–9), Italian for "children". 2 categories : Bambi and Bini
- Piccolo (ages 11 and under), Italian for "little"
- Moskitos (ages 10–12), German for "mosquito". 3 categories : Moskitos B, A and Top
- Mini (ages 12–14), Latin for "small". 3 categories : Minis B, A and Top
- Novizen, Novices or Novizi (ages 15–17), meaning "Novices". 3 categories : Novices A, Top and Elite
- Junioren, Juniors or Juniores (ages 17–20), meaning "Juniors". 4 categories : Juniors A, Top, Elite B and Elite A

== United States ==
In the United States, USA Hockey designates the following levels:

Level	Ages	Details
Mite	8 & under	Red, White and Blue, played as cross-ice games
Squirt	9–10	Levels AAA, AA, A, B, C
Peewee	11–12	Levels AAA, AA, A, B, C
Bantam	13–14	Levels AAA, AA, A, B, C
Midget Minor 15 and Under	15	Level AAA
Midget Minor 16 and Under	ages 15–16	Levels AAA, AA, junior varsity high school-A
Midget Major 18 and Under	15–18	Levels AAA, AA, varsity high school-AA and AAA
Junior	16 to 20	Cut-off age varies depending on the league

Girls hockey operates under their own age classifications, namely 10U, 12U, 14U, 16U and 19U.

Many organizations and leagues that have larger numbers of registered players tend to delineate within the two-year window allowed for each age group. In these situations, teams composed entirely or primarily of players in their second year of eligibility are designated 'major' teams, while those with players in their 1st year of eligibility are designated "minor" teams. (For example, ten-year-olds would be "squirt majors" while nine-year-olds would be "squirt minors".) This is especially true in "AAA".

Some leagues separate players six years old and younger into their own group, often referred to using names like "Mini-Mites", "Mosquitoes", or "Microns."

USA Hockey designates four skill levels:

- Tier 1: The highest level of competition, also called "AAA", following the Canadian system.
- Tier 2: also called "AA" or "A".
- Tier 3: may also be called "A", the lowest level of competitive hockey.
- Recreational/Developmental: Includes house league and select. May also be called "B", "C", etc.

=== AAU ===
The Amateur Athletic Union has returned to licensing the sport of ice hockey.

AAU began licensing scholastic ice hockey programs at the HS Varsity and JV classifications about 2009. Then during the 2011–2012 season the AAU began licensing junior and youth leagues as well. The Western States Hockey League (WSHL) moved their operations from USA Hockey into AAU and Hockey Michigan was formed, providing traditional full-ice playing opportunities at the 7U and 8U age classifications (aka mites) in the face of cross-ice mandates adopted by the USA Hockey district affiliate. During the 2012–2013 season, AAU junior and youth operations expanded rapidly and currently span coast to coast. More recently, AAU hockey has expanded their youth and Junior programs into Canada.

Today, AAU is licensing playing opportunities at all youth age classifications, as well as scholastic, junior, collegiate and adult levels.

Although some AAU clubs still use classification terms such as "mites" or "midgets", the official AAU youth designations indicate the age group with the format "xU", where "x" is the maximum age number and the "U" indicates "and under".

== Officials ==
Officials for youth hockey are often youth players themselves, calling games in lower levels than the one they participate in themselves. As with players who start out playing youth hockey, officials start their officiating career by officiating youth hockey, making it up through the ranks as their officiating skill increases. USA Hockey defines certain levels of their officials and so does Hockey Canada and the International Ice Hockey Federation.

Currently, many youth officials quit after a few games, mainly due to verbal abuse from parents, coaches and players. The other issue faced by young referees is a reluctance from older officials to give them more advanced games. In the US and Canada, news stories pop up from now and then that describes physical abuse on youth officials, in addition to verbal abuse. These problems were addressed in Hockey Canada's "Relax, it's just a game" campaign, which started in 2002.

A youth official can usually move up the ladder to juniors after about 2 years of officiating, and after a few years move up to senior hockey. This is, as with players, different for each individual as their skill-curves are differently shaped.

Many current and former officials feel that their officiating career has aided them in their professional life as well as being more comfortable with handling critical decisions and upset individuals.

== See also ==
- Junior ice hockey
- Youth ice hockey coach
