= Hallenstadion (Chur) =

Ice hockey arena in Chur, SwitzerlanD

- Location in Switzerland
- Address: Grossbruggerweg 8, 7000; Chur; Switzerland
- Coordinates: 46.8581°N 9.5045°E
- Capacity: 6,545
- Type: Ice hockey arena

Tenant
- EHC Chur

Website
- Official website

Hallenstadion is an arena in Chur, Switzerland. It is primarily used for ice hockey and is the home arena of EHC Chur. Hallenstadion holds 6,545 people.
