= MyHockey League =

Swiss sports league

- Most recent season or competition: 2025–26 MyHockey League season
- Formerly: MySports League; 2017–2022; MyHockey League; 2022–present
- Sport: Ice hockey
- Founded: 2017
- No. of teams: 12
- Country: Switzerland
- Most recent champion: EHC Seewen (2nd title) (2025–26)
- Most titles: EHC Seewen (2 titles)
- Promotion to: Swiss League
- Relegation to: Swiss 1. Liga
- Website: www.sihf.ch

The MyHockey League, is the third tier of the main professional ice hockey league in Switzerland, behind the Swiss League.

== Teams ==
=== Teams in 2026–27 ===
| Team | City | Arena | Capacity | Founded | Joined |
|---|---|---|---|---|---|
| EHC Bülach | Bülach | Sportzentrum Hirslen | 1,500 | 1942 | 2017 |
| EHC Dübendorf | Dübendorf | Im Chreis | 4,100 | 1939 | 2024 |
| EHC Frauenfeld | Frauenfeld | Kunsteisbahn Frauenfeld | 1,925 | 1946 | 2022 |
| EHC Seewen | Seewen | Stadion Zingel | 1,300 | 1951 | 2017 |
| EHC Thun | Thun | Grabengut | 4,000 | 1966 | 2017 |
| EHC Wetzikon | Wetzikon | Kunsteisbahn Wetzikon | 4,000 | 1949 | 2024 |
| EHC Winterthur | Winterthur | Eishalle Deutweg | 2,496 | 1963 | 2026 |
| HC Franches-Montagnes | Saignelégier | Patinoire Saignelégier | 1,200 | 1958 | 2022 |
| Hockey Huttwil | Huttwil | Campus Perspektiven Huttwil | 3,500 | 1985 | 2017 |
| Pikes EHC Oberthurgau | Romanshorn | EZO Eissportzentrum Oberthurgau | 1,500 | 1965 | 2025 |
| SC Langenthal | Langenthal | Schoren | 4,500 | 1946 | 2023 |
| SC Lyss | Lyss | Seelandhalle | 2,500 | 1964 | 2019 |

=== Former teams ===
| Team | City | Joined | Left | League titles |
|---|---|---|---|---|
| EHC Basel | Basel | 2017 | 2022 | 1 |
| EHC Chur | Chur | 2017 | 2024 | 1 |
| EHC Wiki-Münsingen | Wichtrach | 2017 | 2022 | 0 |
| Forward-Morges HC | Morges | 2017 | 2019 | 0 |
| HC Düdingen Bulls | Düdingen | 2017 | 2024 | 0 |
| HC Neuchâtel Université | Neuchâtel | 2017 | 2018 | 0 |
| HCV Martigny | Martigny | 2017; 2024 | 2023; 2025 | 1 |
| HC Sierre | Sierre | 2018 | 2019 | 1 |
| EHC Arosa | Arosa | 2019 | 2025 | 0 |
| GDT Bellinzona | Bellinzona | 2023 | 2024 | 0 |

== League champions ==
- 2017–18 – EHC Dübendorf
- 2018–19 – HC Sierre
- 2019–20 – not finished
- 2020–21 – not finished
- 2021–22 – EHC Basel
- 2022–23 – HCV Martigny
- 2023–24 – EHC Chur
- 2024–25 – EHC Seewen
- 2025–26 – EHC Seewen

== Titles by team ==
| Titles | Club | Years |
|---|---|---|
| 2 | EHC Seewen | 2025, 2026 |
| 1 | EHC Dübendorf | 2018 |
| 1 | HC Sierre | 2019 |
| 1 | EHC Basel | 2022 |
| 1 | HCV Martigny | 2023 |
| 1 | EHC Chur | 2024 |
