= EHC Winterthur =

- Nickname: Die Löwen (The Lions)
- City: Winterthur, Switzerland
- League: MyHockey League
- Founded: 1929
- Home arena: Zielbau Arena
- Colors
- General manager: Urban Leimbacher
- Head coach: Michel Zeiter
- Captain: Reto Kobach
- Affiliates: SC Rapperswil-Jona Lakers
- Website: ehc-winterthur.ch

Franchise history
- 1929–1963: EHC Winterthur
- 1963–1980: Rot-Wiess Winterthur
- 1980–present: EHC Winterthur

EHC Winterthur is a Swiss amateur ice hockey team who play in Winterthur in the canton of Zürich. They will play in the MyHockey League (MyHL) since the 2026–27 season, the third tier of the main ice hockey leagues in Switzerland, behind the Swiss League.

== History ==
EHC Winterthur was founded in 1929 and remained as an amateur club in the Swiss Regio Leagues until earning promotion to the National League B for the first time in 1961, where Winterthur remained for two seasons before leaving. After relegation from the NLB, the club was merged with the second Winterthur club, EHC Veltheim, to form Rot-Wiess Winterthur on May 30, 1963. As a result, 1963 is also referenced as the club's foundation year.

Rot-Wiess played the following 6 years in the lower leagues before playing a lone season in the NLB in 1969. On April 22, 1980 the club returned to its original name as EHC Winterthur. In the 2009–10 season, EHC Winterthur won the Swiss amateur champion title, but due to lack of financial backing opted not to participate in the NLB.

EHC continued to play between the Regio leagues again earning claiming the Swiss amateur championship at the end of the 2014–15 season, defeating the like of EHC Wiki-Münsingen and HC Sion-Nendaz.

Applying for promotion to the NLB, Winterthur gained its green card with increased financial power and solidified its position within the league through the 2015–16 season.

== Honors ==
Swiss Regio League: (2) 2010, 2015
