= OYM Hall =

Indoor sporting arena in Zug, Switzerland

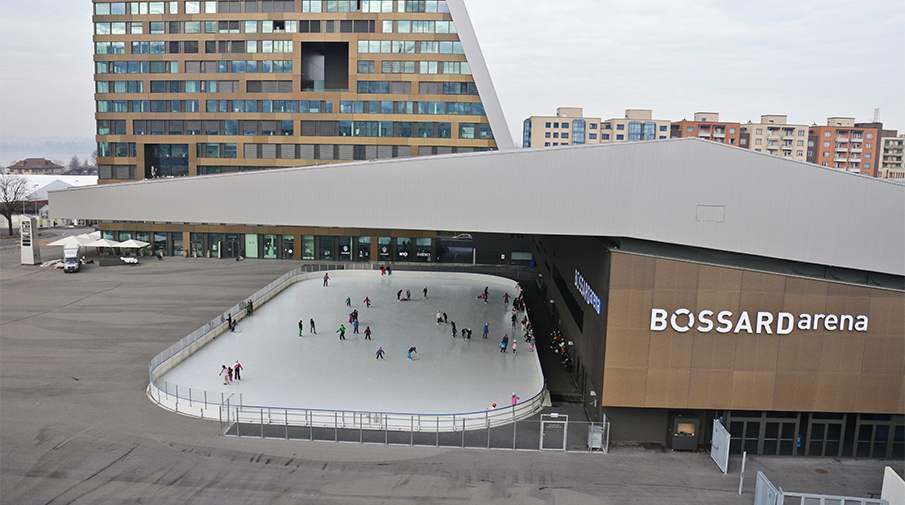
- Interactive map of OYM Hall
- Location: Zug, Switzerland
- Coordinates: 47°10′37″N 8°30′28″E
- Owner: Kunsteisbahn Zug AG
- Capacity: 7,800

Construction
- Groundbreaking: 2008
- Opened: August 20, 2010
- Expanded: 2017; 2024
- Architects: Anliker AG and Scheitlin Syfrig Architekten

Tenant
- EV Zug (NL) (2010-present)

OYM Hall is an indoor sporting arena located in Zug, Switzerland. The capacity of the arena is 7,800 spectators and opened in 2010. It hosts indoor sporting events such as ice hockey. It hosts the EV Zug of the National League (NL). It replaced Eishalle Herti as the home of EV Zug.

== Size issues ==
The arena has faced many critics from EV Zug management and fans for being too limited in terms of capacity. In the summer of 2017, EV Zug added an additional 200 seats close to the boards, on ice level. At the beginning of the 2019-20 season, EVZ CEO Patrick Lengwiler expressed his intentions to the city of Zug, the current owner of the Arena, to extend the capacity to 9,000. The team is currently forced to limit season tickets sales to 6,000 due to the small capacity and could benefit economically from an extension, as demand is high in Zug with the team being very popular.

The issue was again brought back in the media in September 2020 to try and make the city of Zug act quickly.

The arena underwent expansion in the summer of 2024 to add an additional 600 seats.

== See also ==
- List of indoor arenas in Switzerland
