= Swiss 2. Liga (ice hockey) =

Sports competition

- Sport: Ice hockey
- No. of teams: 68
- Country: Switzerland
- Most recent champions: EHC Seewen (Ostschweiz); Wettingen-Baden (Zentralschweiz); Saint-Imier, Meyrin (Romande)
- Promotion to: Swiss 1. Liga
- Relegation to: Swiss 3. Liga
- Website: www.regioleague.ch

The Swiss 2. Liga is the fifth-level ice hockey league in Switzerland. It lies below the National League, the Swiss League, the MySports League and the Swiss 1. Liga.

== Setup ==
The league is divided into three divisions, Ostschweiz (East Switzerland), Zentralschweiz (Central Switzerland), and Suisse Romande. The top teams are promoted to the Swiss 1. Liga and the bottom teams are relegated to the Swiss 3. Liga. The 2. Liga is part of the Regio League, which also consists of the 1. Liga, the 3. Liga and the 4. Liga.
