= Swiss 1. Liga (ice hockey) =

- Sport: Ice hockey
- No. of teams: 27
- Country: Switzerland
- Most recent champion: HC Sion-Nendaz 4 Vallées
- Promotion to: MyHockey League
- Relegation to: Swiss 2. Liga
- Website: www.regioleague.ch

The Swiss 1. Liga is the fourth-highest ice hockey league in Switzerland, behind the National League, the Swiss League and the MyHockey League. The teams compete in three divisions – Eastern Switzerland, Central Switzerland and Western Switzerland.

== Participating teams 2017/18 ==
=== Eastern Switzerland ===
1. Liga teams Division East for the 2017-18 season.

| Team | City | Arena | Capacity |
|---|---|---|---|
| EHC Arosa | Arosa | Obersee | 3,000 |
| GDT Bellinzona | Bellinzona | Centro Sportivo | 2,100 |
| EHC Frauenfeld | Frauenfeld | KEB Frauenfeld | 1,926 |
| SC Herisau | Herisau | Sportzentrum Herisau | 3,152 |
| PIKES EHC Oberthurgau | Romanshorn | EZO Romanshorn | 1,500 |
| HC Prättigau | Prättigau | Eishalle Grüsch | 1,200 |
| EHC Uzwil | Uzwil | Uzehalle | 3,000 |
| SC Weinfelden | Weinfelden | Güttingersreuti | 3,100 |
| EHC Wetzikon | Wetzikon | Eishalle Wetzikon | 4,000 |
| EC Wil | Wil | Sportpark Bergholz | Unknown |

=== Central Switzerland ===
1. Liga teams Division Central for the 2017-18 season.
- Argovia Stars
- EHC Adelboden
- EHC Burgdorf
- SC Lyss
- Red Lions Reinach
- SC Unterseen-Interlaken
- EHC Zuchwil Regio

=== Western Switzerland ===
1. Liga teams Division West for the 2017-18 season.
- HC Franches-Montagnes
- Genève-Servette HC II
- CP Meyrin
- HC Monthey-Chablais
- EHC Saas Valley
- HC Saint-Imier-Sonceboz
- HC Sierre
- HC Vallée de Joux
- HC Villars
- HC Yverdon-les-Bains

== See also ==
- National League - Switzerland's top-tier professional ice hockey league
- Swiss League - Switzerland's second-tier professional ice hockey league
