= Swiss League =

Swiss second ice hockey league

Coordinates: 47.4181°N 7.0778°E

- Current season, competition or edition: 2025–26 Swiss League season
- Formerly: National League B 1947–2017; Swiss League; 2017–2024; Sky Swiss League; 2024–present
- Sport: Ice hockey
- Founded: 1947
- No. of teams: 11
- Country: Switzerland
- Most recent champion: EHC Visp
- Broadcaster: Sky Switzerland
- Promotion to: National League
- Relegation to: MyHockey League
- Related competitions: National League
- Website: www.swissleague.ch

The Swiss League, also known as the Sky Swiss League for sponsorship reasons, is the second tier of the main professional ice hockey league in Switzerland, behind the National League. The winners of the league each season play a best-of-seven series against the bottom team of the NL, and if they win, they are promoted, while the National League team is relegated to the Swiss League.

In 2024, the Swiss League changed its name to Sky Swiss League as a partnership with broadcaster Sky Switzerland. Prior to the 2017–18 season, the league was formerly called National League B. The league attendance in 2018–19 was about 2,700 spectators.

== Current teams ==
Team	Location		Arena	Capacity	Founded	Joined league
Team	City	Canton	Arena	Capacity	Founded	Joined league
EHC Arosa	Arosa	Grisons	Sport- und Kongresszentrum Arosa	2,200	1924	2025
EHC Basel	Basel	Basel-Stadt	St. Jakob Arena	6,700	1932	2022
EHC Chur	Chur	Grisons	Thomas Domenig Stadion	6,500	1933	2024
HC La Chaux-de-Fonds	La Chaux-de-Fonds	Neuchâtel	Patinoire des Mélèzes	7,200	1919	2001
GCK Lions	Küsnacht	Zürich	Eishalle Küsnacht	2,200	1932	2000
GDT Bellinzona Snakes	Bellinzona	Ticino	Centro Sportivo	2,100	1980	2016
EHC Olten	Olten	Solothurn	Kleinholz Stadion	6,500	1934	1994
HC Sierre	Sierre	Valais	Patinoire de Graben	4,500	1933	2019
HC Thurgau	Weinfelden	Thurgau	Güttingersreuti	3,200	1989	2006
EHC Visp	Visp	Valais	Lonza Arena	5,150	1941	1999
EHC Winterthur	Winterthur	Zürich	Zielbau Arena	3,000	1929	2015

Swiss League teams for the 2022–23 season

=== Former Teams ===
- Forward-Morges HC - withdrawal at the end of the 2005–06 season
- EHC Biel - promoted to National League A after the 2007–08 season
- Lausanne HC - promoted to National League A after the 2012–13 season
- SCL Tigers - promoted to National League A after the 2014–15 season
- HC Red Ice - bankruptcy after the 2016–17 season
- HCB Ticino Rockets - relocated to Bellinzona at the end of the 2022–23 season
- SC Rapperswil-Jona Lakers - promoted to National League after the 2017–18 season
- HC Ajoie - promoted to the National League following the 2020–21 season
- EHC Kloten - promoted to the National League at the end of the 2021–22 season
- SC Langenthal - withdrawal from professional hockey at the end of the 2022–23 season
- HCV Martigny - withdrawal from professional hockey at the end of the 2023–24 season

== See also ==
- National League
- Swiss 1. Liga
