= 2013 Spengler Cup =

2013 Spengler Cup Davos, Switzerland
Tournament details
- Host country: Switzerland
- Venue(s): Vaillant Arena
- Dates: 26–31 December 2013
- Teams: 6

Final positions
- Champions: (Switzerland) HC Genève-Servette (1st title)
- Runner-up: (Russia) HC CSKA Moscow

Tournament statistics
- Games played: 11
- Goals scored: 81 (7.36 per game)
- Attendance: 68,668 (6,243 per game)
- Scoring leader(s): (Canada) Matthew Lombardi (8 pts)

The 2013 Spengler Cup was held in Davos, Switzerland from 26 to 31 December 2013. All matches were played at HC Davos's home known as Vaillant Arena. Six competing teams were split into two groups of three. The two groups, named Torriani and Cattini, were named after legendary Swiss hockey players Richard 'Bibi' Torriani and the Cattini brothers, Hans and Ferdinand.

== Teams participating ==
The list of teams that have been confirmed for the tournament are as listed:

- (Switzerland) HC Davos (host)
- Team Canada
- (United States) Rochester Americans
- (Switzerland) Genève-Servette HC
- (Czech Republic) HC Vítkovice Steel
- (Russia) HC CSKA Moscow

The division of the six teams into two groups of three and the subsequent schedule were determined on 12 August 2013.

== Match Officials ==
Here is the full list of match officials that has been confirmed for the tournament at this time:

Referees	Linesmen
(Russia) Konstantin Olenin	(Switzerland) Roger Arm
(United States) Steve Patafie	(Switzerland) Nicolas Fluri
(Switzerland) Danny Kurmann	(Switzerland) Roman Kaderli
(Switzerland) Didier Massy	(Switzerland) Andreas Kohler
(Switzerland) Brent Reiber	(Switzerland) Michaël Tscherrig

== Publications ==
Once again this year, the Spengler Cup will make all of their available publications, including all matchday programmes and the event media guide, available for download on their website, as they did last year for the first time.

These publications are available in German only.

== Group stage ==
=== Key ===
- W (regulation win) – 3 pts.
- OTW (overtime/shootout win) – 2 pts.
- OTL (overtime/shootout loss) – 1 pt.
- L (regulation loss) – 0 pts.

=== Group Torriani ===
Team	Pld	W	OTW	OTL	L	GF	GA	GD	Pts	Qualification
(Switzerland) Genève-Servette HC	2	1	1	0	0	9	3	+6	5	Clinched group
(Russia) HC CSKA Moscow	2	1	0	1	0	7	7	0	4	Quarterfinal berth
(United States) Rochester Americans	2	0	0	0	2	3	9	−6	0	Quarterfinal berth

All times are local (UTC+1).

26 December 2013; 15:00	Genève-Servette HC (Switzerland)	5–0 (1 – 0, 1 – 0, 3 – 0)	(United States) Rochester Americans	Vaillant Arena; Attendance: 5,865

Game reference

Tobias Stephan
Goalies
Matt Hackett
Referees:
(Russia) Konstantin Olenin
(Switzerland) Brent Reiber
Linesmen:
(Switzerland) Roger Arm
(Switzerland) Michaël Tscherrig

Kaspars Daugavins (Matthew Lombardi) (SH) – 11:41	1 – 0
Matthew Lombardi (Garrett Stafford, Kaspars Daugavins) (PP) – 38:49	2 – 0
Matthew Lombardi (John Fritsche, Inti Pestoni) – 45:11	3 – 0
Juraj Simek (Goran Bezina) – 46:46	4 – 0
Cody Almond (Alexandre Picard, Juraj Simek) – 56:22	5 – 0

33 min
Penalties
60 min
37
Shots
23

27 December 2013; 15:00	HC CSKA Moscow (Russia)	4–3 (1 – 1, 1 – 1, 2 – 1)	(United States) Rochester Americans	Vaillant Arena; Attendance: 6,303

Game reference

Rastislav Staňa
Goalies
Matt Hackett
Referees:
(United States) Steve Patafie
(Switzerland) Brent Reiber
Linesmen:
(Switzerland) Roman Kaderli
(Switzerland) Michaël Tscherrig

Igor Grigorenko (Nikolai Prokhorkin, Nikita Zaitsev) (PP) – 15:02	1 – 0
	1 – 1	19:54 – Phil Varone
	1 – 2	20:28 – Luke Adam (Phil Varone, Dan Catenacci)
Alexander Radulov (Igor Grigorenko) – 23:32	2 – 2
Nikolai Prokhorkin (Nikita Zaitsev, Alexander Radulov) (PP) – 48:46	3 – 2
Igor Grigorenko (Alexander Radulov) – 54:52	4 – 2
	4 – 3	59:59 -Luke Adam

4 min
Penalties
10 min
38
Shots
28

28 December 2013; 15:00	Genève-Servette HC (Switzerland)	4 – 3 OT (1 – 1, 1 – 2, 1 – 0, 1 – 0)	(Russia) HC CSKA Moscow	Vaillant Arena; Attendance: 6,303

Game reference

Robert Mayer
Goalies
Ilya Proskuryakov
Referees:
(Switzerland) Danny Kurmann
(Switzerland) Brent Reiber
Linesmen:
(Switzerland) Nicolas Fluri
(Switzerland) Michael Tscherrig

	0 – 1	02:15 – Alexander Frolov
Denis Hollenstein (Arnaud Jacquemet, Kevin Romy) – 08:06	1 – 1
	1 – 2	27:38 – Alexander Radulov (Ilya Proskuryakov)
	1 – 3	30:57 – Sergei Fedorov (Stanislav Yegorshev) (PP)
Kaspars Daugavins (Markus Nordlund, Inti Pestoni) – 34:03	2 – 3
Alexandre Picard (Inti Pestoni, Kaspars Daugavins) – 56:37	3 – 3
Kaspars Daugavins (Garrett Stafford, Denis Hollenstein) – 61:53	4 – 3

8 min
Penalties
6 min
41
Shots
29

=== Group Cattini ===
Team	Pld	W	OTW	OTL	L	GF	GA	GD	Pts	Qualification
(Switzerland) HC Davos	2	2	0	0	0	8	3	+5	6	Clinched group
Team Canada	2	1	0	0	1	7	7	0	3	Quarterfinal berth
(Czech Republic) HC Vítkovice Steel	2	0	0	0	2	5	10	−5	0	Quarterfinal berth

All times are local (UTC+1).

26 December 2013; 20:15	Team Canada	5–4 (2 – 2, 1 – 2, 2 – 0)	(Czech Republic) HC Vítkovice Steel	Vaillant Arena; Attendance: 6,076

Game reference

Chris Mason
Goalies
Filip Šindelář
Referees:
(Switzerland) Danny Kurmann
(Switzerland) Didier Massy
Linesmen:
(Switzerland) Nicolas Fluri
(Switzerland) Andreas Kohler

Alexandre Bolduc (Travis Ehrhardt) – 02:33	1 – 0
	1 – 1	04:20 – Lukáš Kucsera (Michal Hlinka, Petr Kolouch)
Glen Metropolit (Geoff Kinrade) – 09:46	2 – 1
	2 – 2	17:05 – Richard Stehlík (Gian-Andrea Randegger, Jiří Burger) (PP)
	2 – 3	31:26 – Rudolf Huna (Vladimír Svačina)
Micki Dupont (Jacob Micflikier) (PP) – 33:38	3 – 3
	3 – 4	33:49 – Peter Húževka (Michael Vandas)
Byron Ritchie (Eric Beaudoin, Micki Dupont) – 47:58	4 – 4
Derrick Walser (Anthony Stewart, Glen Metropolit) – 53:49	5 – 4

12 min
Penalties
26 min
42
Shots
22

27 December 2013; 20:15	HC Davos (Switzerland)	5–1 (2 – 0, 2 – 0, 1 – 1)	(Czech Republic) HC Vítkovice Steel	Vaillant Arena; Attendance: 6,303

Game reference

Leonardo Genoni
Goalies
Roman Málek
Referees:
(Switzerland) Didier Massy
(Russia) Konstantin Olenin
Linesmen:
(Switzerland) Roger Arm
(Switzerland) Andreas Kohler

Beat Forster (Peter Guggisberg, Andres Ambühl) – 02:51	1 – 0
Dino Wieser (Dario Bürgler, Reto von Arx) – 03:12	2 – 0
Robin Grossmann (René Back) – 22:43	3 – 0
Gregory Hofmann (Ryan O'Connor) (PP) – 26:04	4 – 0
Ville Koistinen (Dario Bürgler) (PP) – 43:36	5 – 0
	5 – 1	44:14 – Roman Szturc (Michal Hlinka)

6 min
Penalties
12 min
21
Shots
37

28 December 2013; 20:15	Team Canada	2–3 (0 – 0, 0 – 2, 2 – 1)	(Switzerland) HC Davos	Vaillant Arena; Attendance: 6,303

Game reference

Allen York
Goalies
Mika Noronen
Referees:
(United States) Steve Patafie
(Russia) Konstantin Olenin
Linesmen:
(Switzerland) Roger Arm
(Switzerland) Roman Kaderli

	0 – 1	27:19 – Marcus Paulsson (Niklas Persson)
	0 – 2	31:43 – Peter Guggisberg (Enzo Corvi)
Darren Haydar (Byron Ritchie, Jason Williams) – 44:45	1 – 2
	1 – 3	57:01 – Andres Ambühl (Beat Forster) (PP)
Maxim Noreau (Byron Ritchie) (PP) – 58:03	2 – 3

12 min
Penalties
14 min
26
Shots
29

== Knockout stage ==
Quarterfinals
A2	(Russia) HC CSKA Moscow (OT)	3
B3	(Czech Republic) HC Vítkovice Steel	2
B2	Team Canada	6
A3	(United States) Rochester Americans	3

Semifinals
B1	(Switzerland) HC Davos	4
QF1	(Russia) HC CSKA Moscow (SO)	5
A1	(Switzerland) Genève-Servette HC	6
QF2	Team Canada	5

Final
SF1	(Russia) HC CSKA Moscow	3
SF2	(Switzerland) Genève-Servette HC	5

=== Quarterfinals ===
All times are local (UTC+1).

29 December 2013; 15:00	HC CSKA Moscow (Russia)	3 – 2 OT (0 – 0, 2 – 2, 0 – 0, 1 – 0)	(Czech Republic) HC Vítkovice Steel	Vaillant Arena; Attendance: 6,303

Game reference

Rastislav Staňa
Goalies
Filip Šindelář
Referees:
(Switzerland) Didier Massy
(United States) Steve Patafie
Linesmen:
(Switzerland) Andreas Kohler
(Switzerland) Roman Kaderli

	0 – 1	24:36 – Richard Stehlík (Jiří Burger)
	0 – 2	25:06 – Vladimír Svačina (Rudolf Huna, Ondřej Roman)
Ruslan Zainullin (Georgi Misharin, Roman Lyubimov) – 29:45	1 – 2
Vladimir Zharkov (Nikolai Prokhorkin, Yakov Rylov) (PP) – 39:51	2 – 2
Yakov Rylov (Georgi Misharin) – 60:46	3 – 2

10 min
Penalties
10 min
36
Shots
37

29 December 2013; 20:15	Team Canada	6–3 (3 – 0, 1 – 3, 2 – 0)	(United States) Rochester Americans	Vaillant Arena; Attendance: 6,303

Game reference

Chris Mason
Allen York (20:00, 3rd period)
Goalies
Nathan Lieuwen
Matt Hackett (20:00, 2nd period)
Referees:
(Switzerland) Danny Kurmann
(Russia) Konstantin Olenin
Linesmen:
(Switzerland) Roger Arm
(Switzerland) Nicolas Fluri

Byron Ritchie (Jason Williams) – 07:31	1 – 0
Jacob Micflikier (Brett McLean, Ahren Spylo) (PP) – 15:05	2 – 0
Jacob Micflikier (Ahren Spylo, Geoff Kinrade) (PP) – 18:41	3 – 0
	3 – 1	21:55 – Alex Hutchings (Johan Larsson)
Derrick Walser (Darren Haydar) – 26:06	4 – 1
	4 – 2	26:56 – Dan Catenacci (Luke Adam, Phil Varone)
	4 – 3	33:11 – Joel Armia (Phil Varone, Luke Adam) (PP)
Byron Ritchie (Darren Haydar, Travis Roche) (PP) – 50:05	5 – 3
Alexandre Giroux (Ahren Spylo) (EN) – 59:17	6 – 3

10 min
Penalties
10 min
34
Shots
27

=== Semifinals ===
All times are local (UTC+1).

30 December 2013; 15:00	HC Davos (Switzerland)	4 – 5 SO (2 – 1, 1 – 3, 1 – 0, 0 – 0, 0 – 1) (SO: 1 – 2)	(Russia) HC CSKA Moscow	Vaillant Arena; Attendance: 6,303

Game reference

Leonardo Genoni
Goalies
Ilya Proskuryakov
Referees:
(Switzerland) Didier Massy
(Switzerland) Brent Reiber
Linesmen:
(Switzerland) Andreas Kohler
(Switzerland) Michaël Tscherrig

Enzo Corvi (Andres Ambühl) – 03:28	1 – 0
	1 – 1	07:12 – Ilari Filppula (Alexander Radulov)
Nicklas Danielsson (Niklas Persson, René Back) – 15:42	2 – 1
	2 – 2	20:19 – Alexander Radulov (Yakov Rylov) (PP)
	2 – 3	29:44 – Alexander Radulov (Ivan Neprayev)
Ville Koistinen (Zdeněk Kutlák) – 34:11	3 – 3
	3 – 4	38:09 – Vladimir Zharkov (Stanislav Yegorshev, Nikolai Prokhorkin)
Peter Sejna (Zdeněk Kutlák, Andres Ambühl) (PP) – 57:25	4 – 4

Ville Koistinen (miss)
Marcus Paulsson (miss)
Reto Von Arx
Shootout
Alexander Radulov
(miss) Nikolai Prokhorkin
Alexander Frolov
6 min
Penalties
10 min
44
Shots
33

30 December 2013; 20:15	Genève-Servette HC (Switzerland)	6–5 (2 – 0, 2 – 2, 2 – 3)	Team Canada	Vaillant Arena; Attendance: 6,303

Game reference

Tobias Stephan
Goalies
Allen York
Matt Hackett (03:07, 2nd period)
Referees:
(Switzerland) Danny Kurmann
(United States) Steve Patafie
Linesmen:
(Switzerland) Nicolas Fluri
(Switzerland) Roman Kaderli

Matthew Lombardi (SH) – 02:46	1 – 0
Denis Hollenstein (Matthew Lombardi, Kevin Romy) (PP) – 15:22	2 – 0
Inti Pestoni (Matthew Lombardi, Kaspars Daugaviņš) – 23:07	3 – 0
	3 – 1	24:29 – Alexandre Giroux (Geoff Kinrade)
Arnaud Jacquemet (Goran Bezina) – 28:13	4 – 1
	4 – 2	37:15 – Travis Roche (Byron Ritchie) (PP)
Matthew Lombardi (Arnaud Jacquemet) – 43:05	5 – 2
	5 – 3	39:22 – Jacob Micflikier (Colby Genoway, Brett McLean)
Daniel Vukovic (Roland Gerber, Chris Rivera) – 50:06	6 – 3
	6 – 4	56:40 – Darren Haydar (Jason Williams, Byron Ritchie) (PP)
	6 – 5	58:18 – Jason Williams (Glen Metropolit, Darren Haydar) (PP)

12 min
Penalties
6 min
24
Shots
55

=== Final ===
All times are local (UTC+1).

31 December 2013; 12:00	HC CSKA Moscow (Russia)	3–5 (0 – 2, 1 – 2, 2 – 1)	(Switzerland) Genève-Servette HC	Vaillant Arena; Attendance: 6,303

Game reference

Rastislav Staňa
Goalies
Robert Mayer
Referees:
(Switzerland) Didier Massy
(United States) Steve Patafie
Linesmen:
(Switzerland) Roger Arm
(Switzerland) Andreas Kohler

	0 – 1	07:00 – Juraj Šimek (Denis Hollenstein) (PP)
	0 – 2	10:24 – Denis Hollenstein (Kevin Romy)
	0 – 3	23:48 – Lennart Petrell (Roland Gerber)
	0 – 4	36:21 – Kevin Romy (Daniel Vukovic)
Oleg Saprykin (Dmitri Ogurtsov, Alexei Morozov) – 39:00	1 – 4
Alexander Frolov – 41:15	2 – 4
Nikita Zaitsev (Alexander Frolov) – 56:31	3 – 4
	3 – 5	59:00 – Kaspars Daugaviņš (Matthew Lombardi, Goran Bezina) (EN)

30 min
Penalties
10 min
44
Shots
36

== Champions ==
2013 Spengler Cup Winners
(Switzerland)
HC Genève-Servette
First title

== All-Star Team ==
Position	Player	Nationality	Team
Goaltender	Tobias Stephan	(Switzerland) Swiss	(Switzerland) HC Genève-Servette
Right Defender	Ville Koistinen	(Finland) Finnish	(Switzerland) HC Davos
Left Defender	Markus Nordlund	(Finland) Finnish	(Switzerland) HC Genève-Servette
Right Wing	Alexander Radulov	(Russia) Russian	(Russia) HC CSKA Moscow
Center	Matthew Lombardi	(Canada) Canadian	(Switzerland) HC Genève-Servette
Left Wing	Kaspars Daugaviņš	(Latvia) Latvian	(Switzerland) HC Genève-Servette

== Statistics ==
=== Scoring leaders ===
Player	Team	GP	G	A	Pts
(Canada) Matthew Lombardi	HC Genève-Servette	4	4	4	8
(Latvia) Kaspars Daugaviņš	HC Genève-Servette	4	3	4	7
(Russia) Alexander Radulov	HC CSKA Moscow	5	4	3	7
(Canada) Byron Ritchie	Team Canada	4	3	2	5
(Canada) Darren Haydar	Team Canada	4	2	3	5

GP = Games Played G = Goals; A = Assists; Pts = Points

== Television ==
Several television channels around the world will cover many or all matches of the Spengler Cup. As well as most Swiss channels, here is a listing of who else will cover the tournament:

- Schweizer Radio und Fernsehen (Switzerland, host broadcaster)
- The Sports Network, Réseau des Sports (Canada)
- Eurosport 2, British Eurosport, Eurosport Asia and Pacific, and Eurosport HD
- Nova Sport (Czech Republic, Slovakia)
- Time Warner Cable Sports Channel (New York State (United States))
