= Rylov =

Rylov (Russian: Рылов) is a male Russian surname. Its feminine counterpart is Rylova (Russian: Рылова). It may refer to:

- Arkady Rylov (1870–1939), Russian Symbolist painter
- Artur Rylov (born 1989), Russian association football player
- Dmitry Rylov (born 2001), Russian pair skater
- Evgeny Rylov (born 1996), Russian swimmer
- Malou Marcetto Rylov (born 2003), Danish footballer
- Sergei Rylov (born 1975), Russian-Azerbaijani figure skater
- Yakov Rylov (born 1985), Russian ice hockey defender
- Tamara Rylova (1931–2021), Russian speed skater
