= Dan Catenacci =

Dan Catenacci may refer to:

- Dan Catenacci (fashion designer) or Dan Caten, fashion designer part of Dean and Dan Caten
- Daniel Catenacci (born 1993), Canadian professional ice hockey player
