= Joel Armia =

Finnish ice hockey player (born 1993)

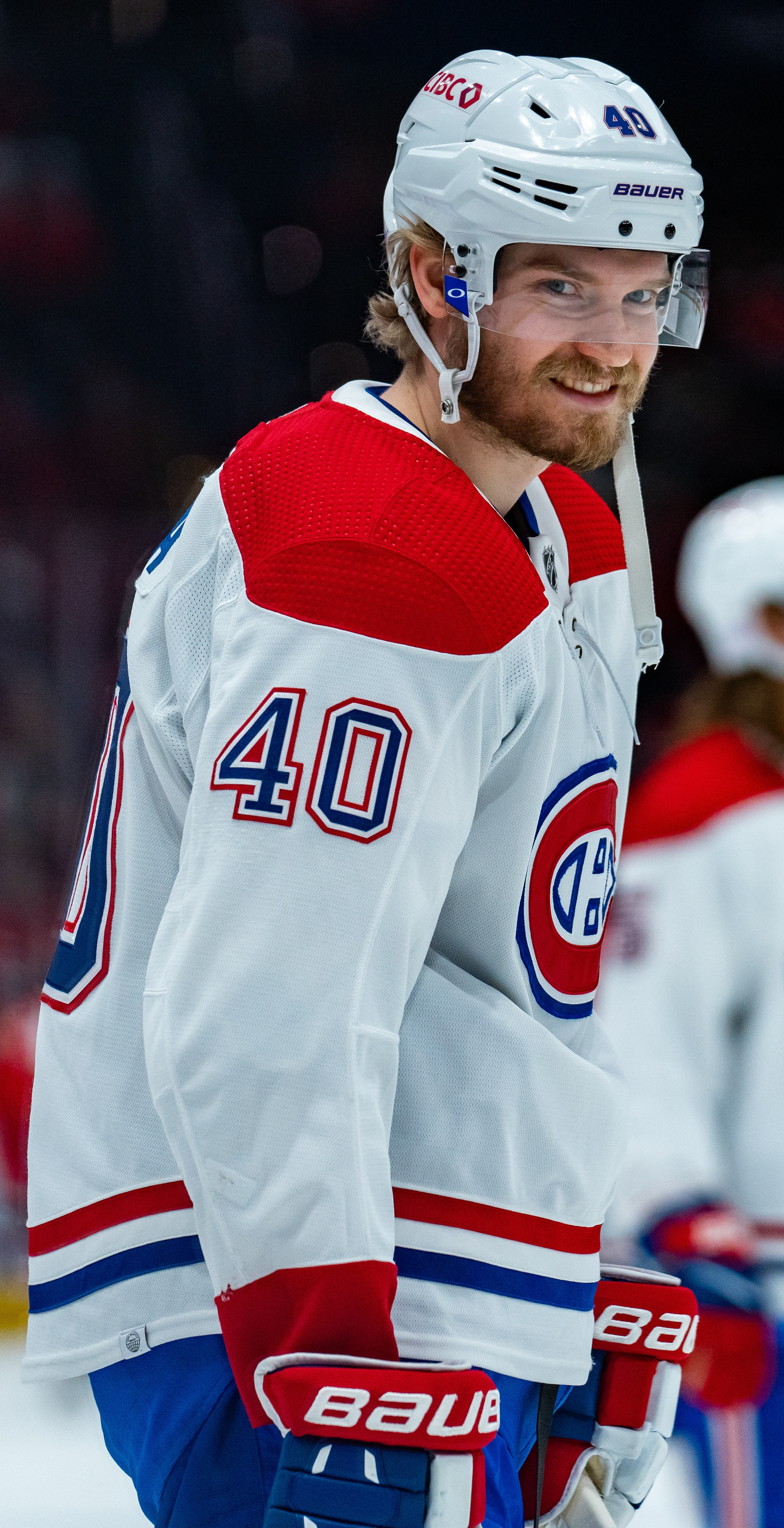
- Armia with the Montreal Canadiens in 2021
- Born: 31 May 1993 (age 33) Pori, Finland
- Height: 6 ft 3 in (191 cm)
- Weight: 216 lb (98 kg; 15 st 6 lb)
- Position: Winger
- Shoots: Right
- NHL team Former teams: Los Angeles Kings; Porin Ässät; Buffalo Sabres; Winnipeg Jets; Montreal Canadiens
- National team: Finland
- NHL draft: 16th overall, 2011; Buffalo Sabres
- Playing career: 2010–present

Joel Armia (Finnish pronunciation: [ˈjo̞e̞l ˈɑrmiɑ]; born 31 May 1993) is a Finnish professional ice hockey player who is a winger for the Los Angeles Kings of the National Hockey League (NHL). He was selected in the first round, 16th overall, by the Buffalo Sabres in the 2011 NHL entry draft. Armia has also previously played professionally for Porin Ässät of the SM-liiga as well as the Winnipeg Jets and Montreal Canadiens.

== Playing career ==
=== Porin Ässät ===
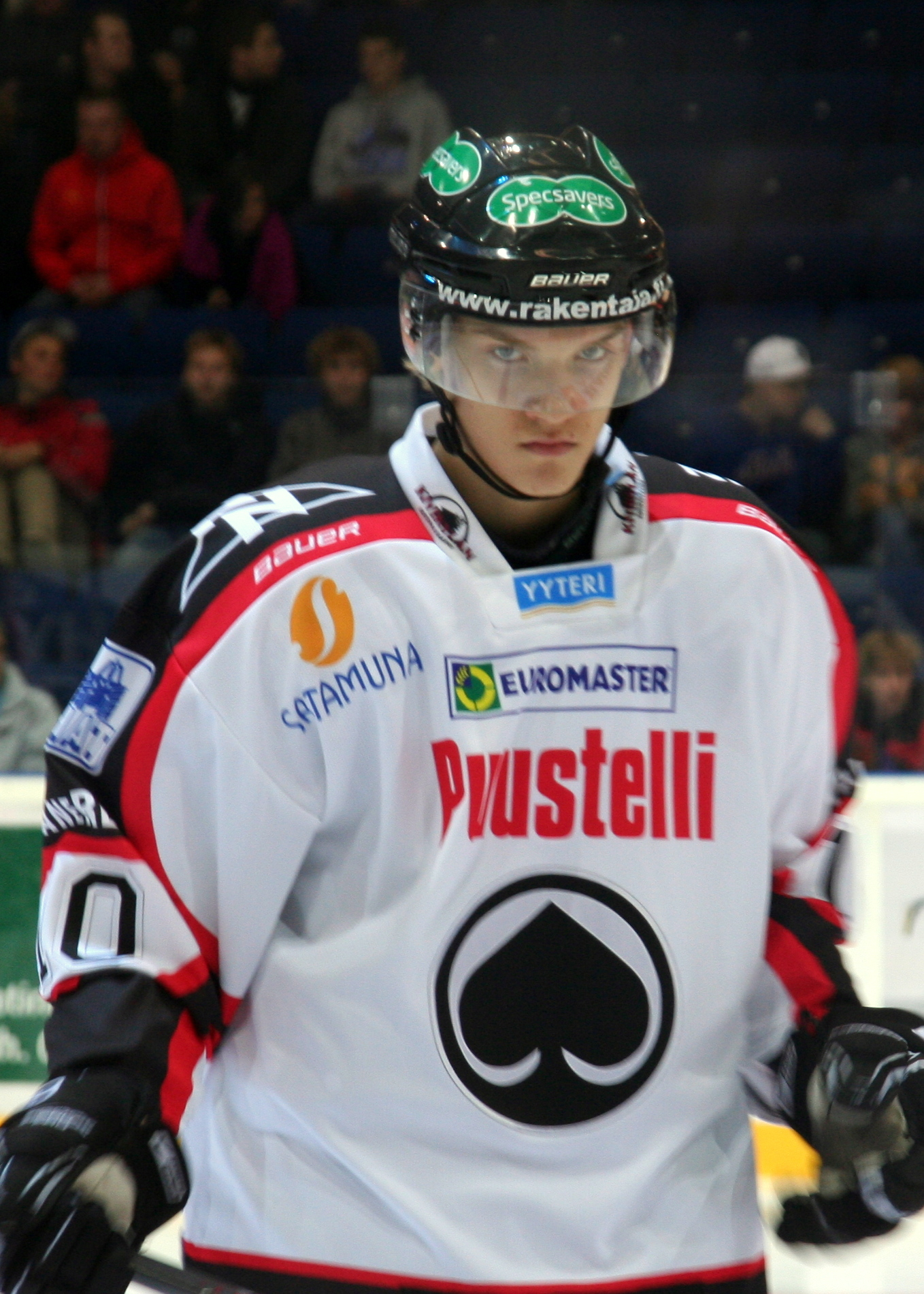
Armia playing for Porin Ässät in 2010, as a 17-year-old.

In the 2008–09 season, Armia was the highest goal scoring player of the U16 SM-sarja with 27 goals, winning the Keijo Kuusela award. In the following season, he played in 27 games with Ässät U20, recording 15 goals and six assists for a total of 21 points.

At the age of 17, Armia was promoted to Porin Ässät during the course of the 2010–11 season after showing great talent across both the team's junior ranks as well as the Finnish national U18 team. In his SM-liiga rookie campaign, Armia would record 18 goals and 11 assists, being the highest goal-scorer amongst rookies leaguewide. He would likewise appear in five playoff games scoring two goals.

While in Ässät, Armia was considered one of the most talented players of his age group and a future superstar by media, due much in part to his natural goal scoring prowness. Eric Weissman, a former scout for the Buffalo Sabres, highlighted Armia's puck possession abilities. In the same article by The Athletic, he was referred to as a pure skill player. Armia was ultimately selected by the Sabres in the first round (16th overall) during the 2011 NHL entry draft as well as 14th overall by Severstal Cherepovets of the Kontinental Hockey League (KHL) in the 2011 KHL Junior Draft. In the following season, he appeared in 54 regular season games and collected 18 goals and 20 assists for 38 points with Ässät, along with two assists in three playoff games. In June 2012, Armia signed with the Sabres, but would return to Ässät on a loan for one more season. In 2012–13, he played in 47 regular season games recording 19 goals and 14 assists for a total of 33 points, and was instrumental in helping Ässät capture the Kanada-malja championship, recording three goals with five assists across 16 playoff games.

=== Buffalo Sabres and trade to the Winnipeg Jets (2013–2018) ===
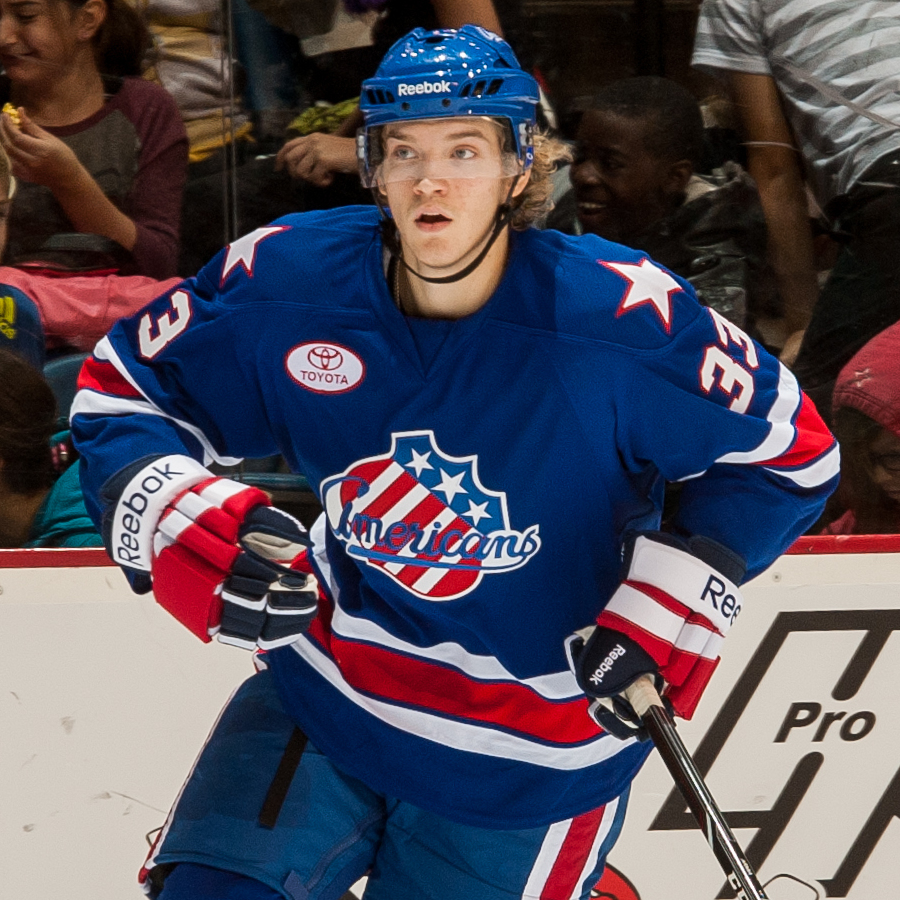
Armia with the Rochester Americans in November 2013.

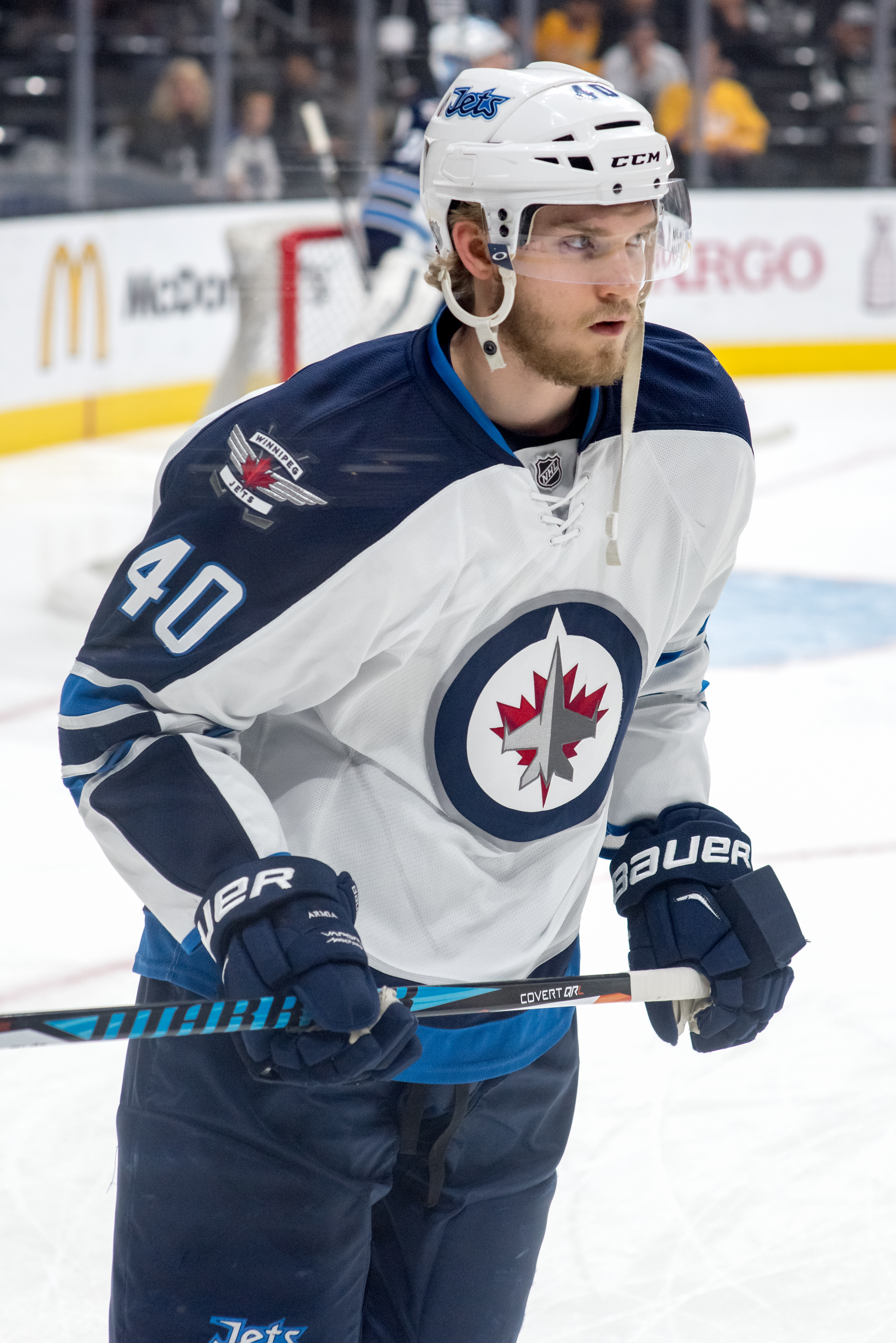
Armia with the Winnipeg Jets in 2016

On 16 June 2012, Armia was signed to a three-year entry-level contract with the Sabres. He managed seven goals and 20 assists for the Sabres' American Hockey League (AHL) affiliate, the Rochester Americans, during the 2013–14 AHL season, and also participated in the 2013 Spengler Cup with the team, scoring one goal. During his second North American professional season in 2014–15, Armia was recalled from Rochester and made his NHL debut with the Sabres against the Detroit Red Wings on 23 December 2014. He was then returned to the Americans before being traded to the Winnipeg Jets on 11 February 2015.

After being acquired by Winnipeg, Armia was initially assigned to the Jets' AHL affiliate, the St. John's Ice Caps, where he would finish the 2014–15 AHL season. He began the following season with Winnipeg's newly relocated AHL affiliate, the Manitoba Moose, being primarily used as on the penalty kill. Armia would be recalled by the Jets later that NHL season, and scored his first NHL goal against Martin Jones in a 4–1 win over the San Jose Sharks on 2 January 2016. The 2016–17 season, being Armia's first full year in the NHL, was plagued by early struggle as well as injury, where he was forced to miss a total of 24 games. Despite this, he showed improvement upon return while playing on a line with Adam Lowry and Shawn Matthias (who was replaced by Andrew Copp after Matthias suffered an injury). The 2017–18 season built upon this personal success, as Armia finished with 12 goals and 29 points in 79 games to establish then career highs across all statistical categories.

=== Montreal Canadiens (2018–25) ===
On 30 June 2018, the Jets traded Armia along with goaltender Steve Mason and two draft picks to the Montreal Canadiens in exchange for defenceman Simon Bourque. On 13 July 2018, he signed a one-year contract worth $1.85 million with the Canadiens. On 6 October, Armia scored his first goal for Montreal, a shorthanded marker that gave the Canadiens a 4–0 lead over the Pittsburgh Penguins en route to a 5–1 victory. On 1 November, Armia and teammate Max Domi scored the fastest two goals by one team when Montreal defeated the Washington Capitals, 6–4. The former scored at 19:38 of the third period, whereas Armia clinched the win with an empty net goal two seconds later. A few days later, Armia converted the decisive goal in the fifth round of a shootout victory against the New York Islanders on 5 November; being the only player from either team to beat the goaltender. However, in the Canadiens' next game against the New York Rangers on 6 November, Armia suffered a knee injury, and ultimately missed 25 games. In December 2018, it was reported that HC CSKA Moscow bought Armia's KHL rights from Severstal Cherepovets, despite Armia being an active player overseas in the NHL. On 3 January 2019, Armia returned from injury against the Vancouver Canucks; he was credited with an assist on Jordie Benn's opening goal in a 2–0 Montreal win. On 1 March, he registered his first career NHL hat-trick in a 4–2 victory against the New York Rangers.

On 11 July 2019, Armia signed a two-year contract worth $5.2 million with the Canadiens having previously filed for salary arbitration as a restricted free agent. He scored his first two goals of the 2019–20 season in a 5–4 overtime loss to the Buffalo Sabres on 9 October.

After recording seven goals and seven assists during the 2020–21 season, Armia managed five goals and three assists during the Canadiens' deep run to the 2021 Stanley Cup Finals. On 27 July 2021, he signed a four-year, $13.6 million contract extension with the team.

Prior to the beginning of the 2023–24 season, the Canadiens placed Armia on waivers for the purpose of reassignment to AHL affiliate, the Laval Rocket. After clearing waivers, Armia scored two goals in his first AHL appearance with the Rocket on 13 October 2023. Collectively, he played four games with Laval registering four goals and five total points before being recalled by the Canadiens on 21 October. Armia was subsequently sent back to Laval on 12 November. After Arber Xhekaj was placed on injured reserve, the Canadiens recalled Armia yet again on 24 November. Armia would finish the regular season with 17 goals, surpassing his personal best to date. For his efforts, Armia was chosen as the Canadiens' candidate for the Bill Masterton Memorial trophy.

During the course of the 2024–25 season, Armia registered his 100th career NHL goal in a 3–1 win over the Dallas Stars on 16 January 2025. Shortly thereafter, in a game versus the Tampa Bay Lightning on 21 January, Armia provided the primary assist on the game-winning goal scored by Jake Evans, which stood as both the former's 100th career NHL assist as well as his 200th career NHL point respectively.

=== Los Angeles Kings (2025–present) ===
Entering the offseason as an unrestricted free agent, Armia agreed to a two-year contract with the Los Angeles Kings on 1 July 2025.

== International play ==
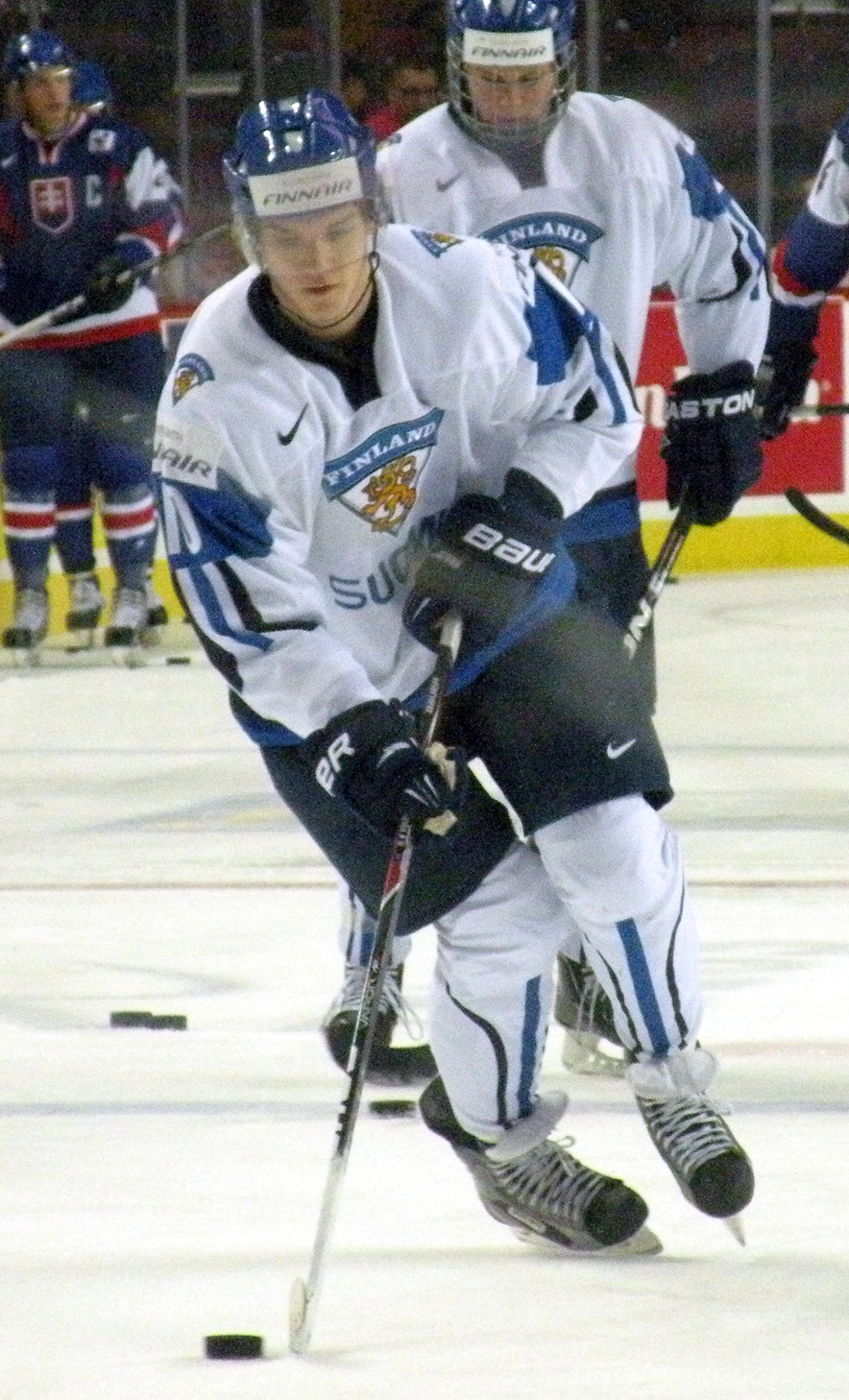
- Armia at the 2012 World Junior Championships

Medal record

Representing Finland

Men's ice hockey

Olympic Games
Bronze medal – third place	2026 Milano Cortina	

World Championships
Gold medal – first place	2022 Finland	

Internationally, Armia first represented Finland as part of its national U18 ranks for the 2010 Ivan Hlinka Memorial Cup. Thereafter, he and the Finnish national U18 team competed at the World U-17 Hockey Challenge in December 2010. Registering eight points in six games, he was named as part of the tournament All-Star team, despite his country placing second to last in overall play. The following year, he participated in the 2011 IIHF World U18 Championships, scoring 13 points in six games.

As part of the Finnish national junior team, Armia appeared in the 2011, 2012 and 2013 World Junior Championships respectively, recording 11 goals and nine assists across 19 total games. In December 2013, Armia, along with the AHL's Rochester Americans, were selected to participate in the annual Spengler Cup tournament held in Davos, Switzerland. For his part, Armia scored one goal during the quarterfinal matchup with Team Canada which was ultimately won by the opposition.

With the Canadiens failing to qualify for the Stanley Cup playoffs following the 2021–22 NHL season, Armia accepted an invitation to play for the Finnish national senior team for the first time at the 2022 IIHF World Championship, which was held in his home country. In his debut against the Norwegian national team, he recorded a goal and an assist in Finland's 5–0 victory. Collectively, Armia recorded four goals and three assists, including the game-winning goal in Finland's semifinal win over the United States national team to reach the championship final. He scored his fifth goal of the tournament in Finland's 4–3 overtime victory versus the Canadian national team, capturing a gold medal.

After the 2022 competition, Armia said that he would like to participate the following year and subsequently accepted an invite for the 2023 IIHF World Championship. He would score his first goal of the tournament against the German national team in a 4–3 victory for Finland. Armia's second goal and only assist came against the Hungarian national team in a 7–1 victory. Finland ultimately lost to Canada in the quarterfinals matchup whereas Armia played eight games and recorded two goals and an assist for a total of three points.

On 4 December 2024, Armia was named to the Finnish roster as part of the NHL-sanctioned 4 Nations Face-Off held in the midst of the 2024–25 campaign. Being held pointless across two tournament games, his country ultimately finished in fourth place at the conclusion of round-robin play.

Armia was invited to represent Finland at the 2026 Winter Olympics in Milan, Italy. He scored his first olympic point with an assist on Eeli Tolvanen's goal against Slovakia in the first game of the tournament. He won a bronze medal. With three goals and five assists, Armia lead Finland in points in the tournament.

== Personal life ==
Armia was born in Pori, and attended a Swedish-speaking school, the Björneborgs svenska samskola, known for having many talented ice hockey players as students. He likewise played association football as a junior for his local club Musan Salama. Armia's father, Risto Armia, played ice hockey as a goalie for Uppsala IK and IK Sirius in Sweden's Division 2 and as a junior in Porin Ässät.

In May 2022, Armia and his wife, former pesäpallo player Emilia Armia, welcomed their first child. In early 2025, it was announced that the couple were expecting their second child.

In December 2025, Joel Armia and other former Porin Ässät players established a foundation to support Ässät juniors to pay for equipment and ice time.

== Career statistics ==
=== Regular season and playoffs ===
			Regular season					Playoffs
Season	Team	League	GP	G	A	Pts	PIM	GP	G	A	Pts	PIM
2009–10	Ässät	FIN U18	6	5	7	12	6	6	6	3	9	8
2009–10	Ässät	Jr. A	27	15	6	21	32	5	1	1	2	0
2010–11	Ässät	SM-l	48	18	11	29	24	5	2	0	2	4
2011–12	Ässät	SM-l	54	18	20	38	66	3	0	2	2	2
2012–13	Ässät	SM-l	47	19	14	33	32	16	3	5	8	20
2013–14	Rochester Americans	AHL	54	7	20	27	30	5	3	3	6	9
2014–15	Rochester Americans	AHL	33	10	15	25	39	—	—	—	—	—
2014–15	Buffalo Sabres	NHL	1	0	0	0	0	—	—	—	—	—
2014–15	St. John's IceCaps	AHL	21	2	6	8	22	—	—	—	—	—
2015–16	Manitoba Moose	AHL	18	3	5	8	16	—	—	—	—	—
2015–16	Winnipeg Jets	NHL	43	4	6	10	12	—	—	—	—	—
2016–17	Winnipeg Jets	NHL	57	10	9	19	20	—	—	—	—	—
2017–18	Winnipeg Jets	NHL	79	12	17	29	22	13	2	0	2	2
2018–19	Montreal Canadiens	NHL	57	13	10	23	14	—	—	—	—	—
2019–20	Montreal Canadiens	NHL	58	16	14	30	28	10	3	2	5	10
2020–21	Montreal Canadiens	NHL	41	7	7	14	10	21	5	3	8	10
2021–22	Montreal Canadiens	NHL	60	6	8	14	14	—	—	—	—	—
2022–23	Montreal Canadiens	NHL	43	7	7	14	22	—	—	—	—	—
2023–24	Laval Rocket	AHL	8	6	3	9	4	—	—	—	—	—
2023–24	Montreal Canadiens	NHL	66	17	8	25	34	—	—	—	—	—
2024–25	Montreal Canadiens	NHL	81	11	18	29	16	5	0	2	2	2
2025–26	Los Angeles Kings	NHL	67	13	12	25	30	3	0	0	0	6
NHL totals			653	116	116	232	222	52	10	7	17	30

=== International ===
Year	Team	Event	Result	GP	G	A	Pts	PIM
2010	Finland	IH18	7th	4	2	4	6	4
2010	Finland	U17	9th	5	5	3	8	2
2011	Finland	U18	5th	6	4	9	13	8
2011	Finland	WJC	6th	6	0	1	1	2
2012	Finland	WJC	4th	7	5	2	7	16
2013	Finland	WJC	7th	6	6	6	12	12
2013	Rochester	SC	6th	3	1	0	1	4
2022	Finland	WC	1st place, gold medalist(s)	10	5	3	8	8
2023	Finland	WC	7th	8	2	1	3	4
2025	Finland	4NF	4th	2	0	0	0	4
2026	Finland	OG	3rd place, bronze medalist(s)	6	3	5	8	2
Junior totals				34	22	25	47	44
Senior totals				26	10	9	19	18

== Awards and honours ==
Award	Year	Ref
International
World U-17 Hockey Challenge All-Star Team	2010	
SM-liiga
Kanada-malja champion	2013	

Awards and achievements
Preceded by Mark Pysyk	Buffalo Sabres first-round draft pick 2011	Succeeded by Mikhail Grigorenko
