= Matt Hackett =

Canadian ice hockey player (born 1990)

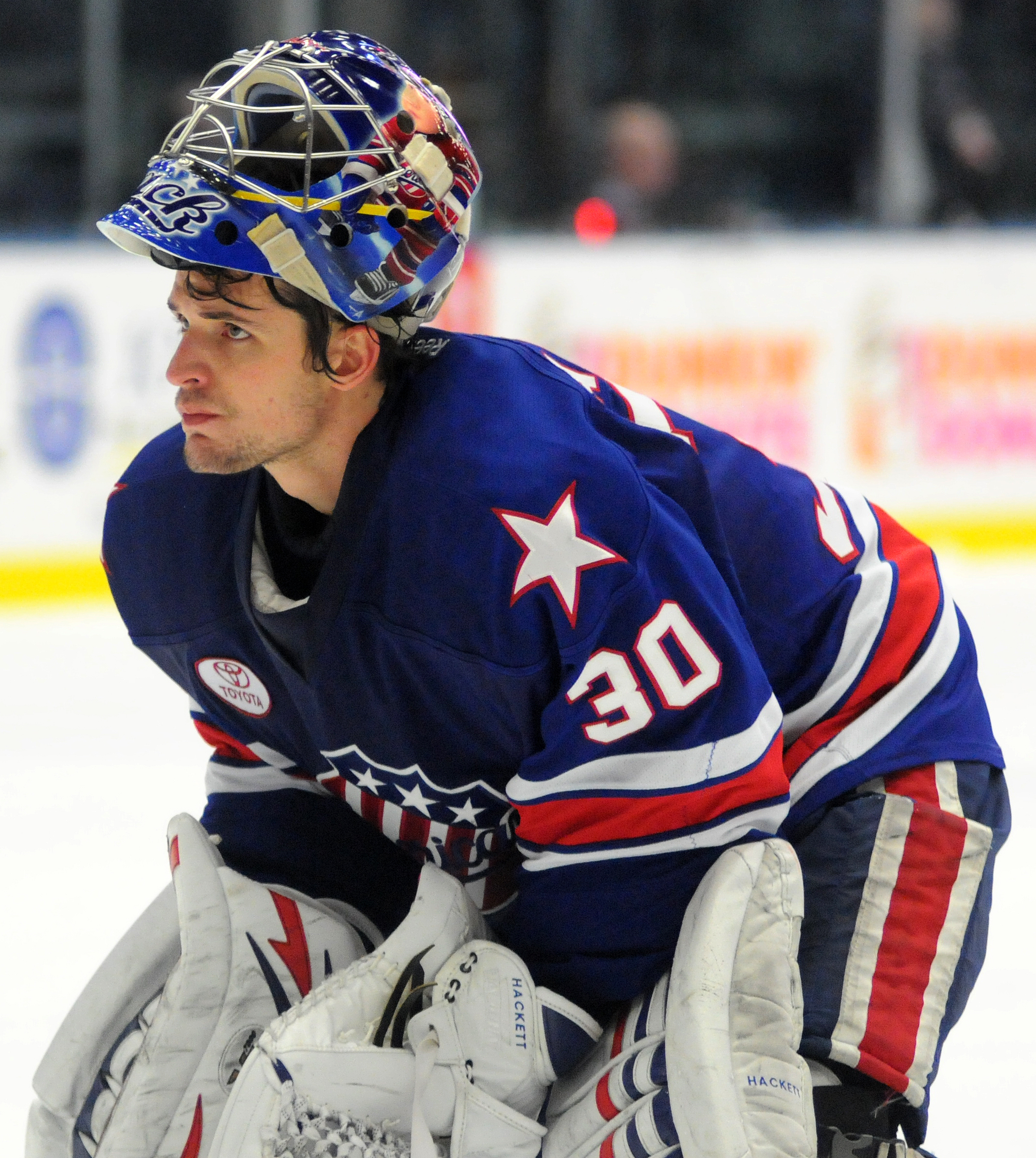
- Hackett with the Rochester Americans in 2014
- Born: March 7, 1990 (age 36) London, Ontario, Canada
- Height: 6 ft 2 in (188 cm)
- Weight: 174 lb (79 kg; 12 st 6 lb)
- Position: Goaltender
- Caught: Left
- Played for: Minnesota Wild; Buffalo Sabres; HC 07 Detva; Coventry Blaze; Stjernen Hockey
- National team: Canada
- NHL draft: 77th overall, 2009; Minnesota Wild
- Playing career: 2010–2020

Matthew Hackett (born March 7, 1990) is a Canadian former ice hockey goaltender. He played 26 games in the National Hockey League with the Minnesota Wild and Buffalo Sabres between 2011 and 2015. The rest of his career, which lasted from 2010 to 2020, was mainly spent in the minor American Hockey League.

He was selected by the Minnesota Wild in the 3rd round (77th overall) of the 2009 NHL entry draft. Matt is a nephew to former NHL goaltender Jeff Hackett.

== Playing career ==
Hackett was called up to the NHL as a backup to Josh Harding on November 23, 2011, for a game against the Nashville Predators after Niklas Bäckström missed the game for personal reasons. In case Hackett did not arrive at the game in time (from his assignment with the Houston Aeros), 51-year-old recreational goaltender Paul Deutsch was signed to an amateur tryout contract, but was eventually scratched as Hackett served as the backup.

Hackett made his National Hockey League (NHL) debut on December 6, 2011, in a road game against the San Jose Sharks, entering 1:11 into the game after starting goalie Harding was injured. In his debut game, Hackett earned a perfect 1.000 save percentage by making 34 saves on 34 shots, a performance that helped lead the Minnesota Wild to a 2–1 victory with the only goal against Minnesota having been in the first minute of play, prior to Hackett entering the game. On December 8, 2011, two days after his NHL debut, Matt Hackett made his first NHL start as the Minnesota Wild played against the Los Angeles Kings. Hackett stopped 42 of 44 shots for a .955 save percentage, helping to lead the Wild to a 4–2 win. In both of these games, Hackett was named the number one star for the game.

On March 2, 2012, after the Wild lost Bäckström to a groin injury, Hackett was again recalled as a back-up to Josh Harding.

During the lockout shortened 2012–13 season, Hackett was dealt at the trade deadline on April 3, 2013, along with Johan Larsson, a 1st round pick in 2013, and a 2nd round pick in 2014 from the Minnesota Wild in exchange for Jason Pominville and a 4th round pick in 2014.

Hackett participated in the 2013 Spengler Cup. His team, the Rochester Americans were invited to participate as one of the teams and Hackett served as their goalie. Rochester was eliminated in the Quarterfinals losing 6–3 to Team Canada. However, Team Canada goalie Chris Mason was injured, so Team Canada called up Hackett to replace him, as he was still in Davos and his team was no longer in the tournament. He played for Canada in the Semifinal game, which they lost 6–5 to Genève-Servette HC. As such, Hackett became the first player to play for two different teams in the same Spengler Cup tournament.

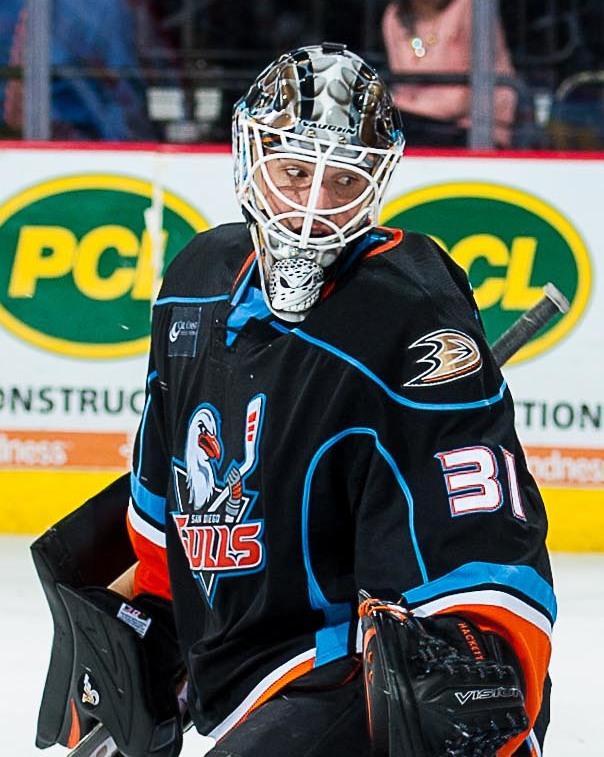
Hackett with the San Diego Gulls in 2015

Hackett made his debut with the Sabres on March 20, 2014, against the Edmonton Oilers. Hackett was called up on an emergency recall after goaltenders Michal Neuvirth and Jhonas Enroth were both injured before a west-coast road trip. Hackett made 35 saves on 36 shots in a 2–1 victory. On April 9, 2014, it was announced that Hackett will act as goaltender for the remaining three games of the season, proving himself in the game on April 8 with 33 saves against the Detroit Red Wings. On April 12, 2014, Hackett suffered a major knee injury against the Boston Bruins. As of April 15, 2014 the Sabres announced Hackett would not return from injury until December, 2015.

On July 1, 2015, Hackett signed as a free agent to a two-year contract with the Anaheim Ducks. Hackett endured two largely disappointing seasons within the Ducks organization, appearing in 29 games with AHL affiliate, the San Diego Gulls. He missed the majority of the 2016-17 campaign after undergoing left shoulder surgery.

As a free agent from the Ducks, Hackett was unable to secure an NHL contract and accepted a one-year ECHL deal with the Orlando Solar Bears on September 5, 2017. However, after making one appearance with the Solar Bears to start the 2017–18 season, in late October, Hackett left the team to pursue opportunities outside of the ECHL and was suspended indefinitely by the team. He later signed abroad to play out the season with the Slovak club HC 07 Detva of the Slovak Extraliga.

Hackett played the 2018-19 season in the Elite Ice Hockey League with the Coventry Blaze before signing a one-year contract with Norwegian club, Stjernen Hockey of GET-ligaen on June 10, 2019.

== Career statistics ==
			Regular season									Playoffs
Season	Team	League	GP	W	L	OTL	MIN	GA	SO	GAA	SV%	GP	W	L	MIN	GA	SO	GAA	SV%
2006–07	Windsor Spitfires	OHL	7	0	5	2	429	36	0	5.04	.859	—	—	—	—	—	—	—	—
2007–08	Windsor Spitfires	OHL	4	1	1	0	130	10	0	4.61	.855	—	—	—	—	—	—	—	—
2007–08	Plymouth Whalers	OHL	18	6	9	1	978	56	0	3.44	.900	1	0	0	16	0	0	0.00	1.000
2008–09	Plymouth Whalers	OHL	55	34	15	3	3036	154	2	3.04	.913	11	6	5	638	32	1	3.01	.930
2009–10	Plymouth Whalers	OHL	56	33	18	3	3165	138	4	2.62	.925	8	3	4	429	24	0	3.36	.919
2010–11	Houston Aeros	AHL	45	23	16	4	2552	101	2	2.37	.916	24	14	10	1465	61	1	2.50	.903
2011–12	Houston Aeros	AHL	44	20	17	6	2546	101	1	2.38	.917	2	0	2	61	6	0	5.93	.897
2011–12	Minnesota Wild	NHL	12	3	6	0	556	22	0	2.37	.922	—	—	—	—	—	—	—	—
2012–13	Houston Aeros	AHL	43	19	20	3	2574	114	0	2.66	.907	—	—	—	—	—	—	—	—
2012–13	Minnesota Wild	NHL	1	0	1	0	59	5	0	5.07	.848	—	—	—	—	—	—	—	—
2012–13	Rochester Americans	AHL	3	3	0	0	185	5	0	1.62	.955	1	0	1	58	2	0	2.08	.900
2013–14	Rochester Americans	AHL	33	13	17	2	1952	100	0	3.07	.898	—	—	—	—	—	—	—	—
2013–14	Buffalo Sabres	NHL	8	1	6	1	426	22	0	3.10	.908	—	—	—	—	—	—	—	—
2014–15	Rochester Americans	AHL	16	8	5	3	934	43	0	2.76	.904	—	—	—	—	—	—	—	—
2014–15	Buffalo Sabres	NHL	5	0	4	1	250	18	0	4.32	.834	—	—	—	—	—	—	—	—
2015–16	San Diego Gulls	AHL	22	10	7	2	1129	57	1	3.03	.895	6	2	4	370	14	1	2.27	.925
2015–16	Utah Grizzlies	ECHL	2	2	0	0	127	4	0	1.89	.932	—	—	—	—	—	—	—	—
2016–17	San Diego Gulls	AHL	7	2	3	0	340	19	1	3.35	.898	—	—	—	—	—	—	—	—
2017–18	Orlando Solar Bears	ECHL	1	1	0	0	24	2	0	4.97	.818	—	—	—	—	—	—	—	—
2017–18	HC 07 Detva	Slovak	28	—	—	—	1584	97	0	3.67	.897	—	—	—	—	—	—	—	—
2018–19	Rosetown Red Wings	ACH	2	1	1	0	120	6	0	3.00	.902	—	—	—	—	—	—	—	—
2018–19	Coventry Blaze	EIHL	27	12	13	0	1538	87	0	3.39	.893	1	0	1	60	5	0	5.00	.865
2019–20	Stjernen Hockey	NOR	5	1	4	0	—	—	0	3.89	.868	—	—	—	—	—	—	—	—
NHL totals			26	4	17	2	1291	67	0	3.11	.906	—	—	—	—	—	—	—	—

== Awards and honours ==
Award	Year
OHL
Second All-Star Team	2009–10
