= Emilia Armia =

Finnish pesäpallo player

Personal information
- Born: Emilia Harjunen; June 30, 1992 (age 33) Pori, Finland
- Occupation: Pesäpallo player
- Years active: 2009-2016
- Spouse: Joel Armia (2022-present)
- Children: 2

Sport
- Position: second outfielder
- League: Superpesis
- Club: Pesäkarhut (2009-2011, 2013-2016); Rauman Lukko (2012)

Emilia Armia (née Harjunen) (born June 30, 1992) is a Finnish retired pesäpallo player. Harjunen played for Pesäkarhut and Rauman Lukko in Superpesis. Harjunen won one Finnish Championship silver medal in the 2013 season and three Finnish Championship bronze medals in the 2011, 2014 and 2016 seasons. She played as a second outfielder.

Harjunen played 119 regular season games in the Superpesis. In these games, she hit four home runs and 18 runs. ges. Harjunen played 54 games in the upper division of Superpesis. In these games, she hit six home runs.

== Career ==
Harjunen played in Pesäkarhut Pori until 2012, when she moved to Rauman Lukko. She returned to Pesäkarhut after one season and retired from pesäpallo in 2016.

== Personal life ==
Armia is married to professional ice hockey player Joel Armia, with whom she has two children. Her younger sister, Anni, also played in Pesäkarhut.
