= Johan Larsson (ice hockey, born 1992) =

Swedish ice hockey player (born 1992)

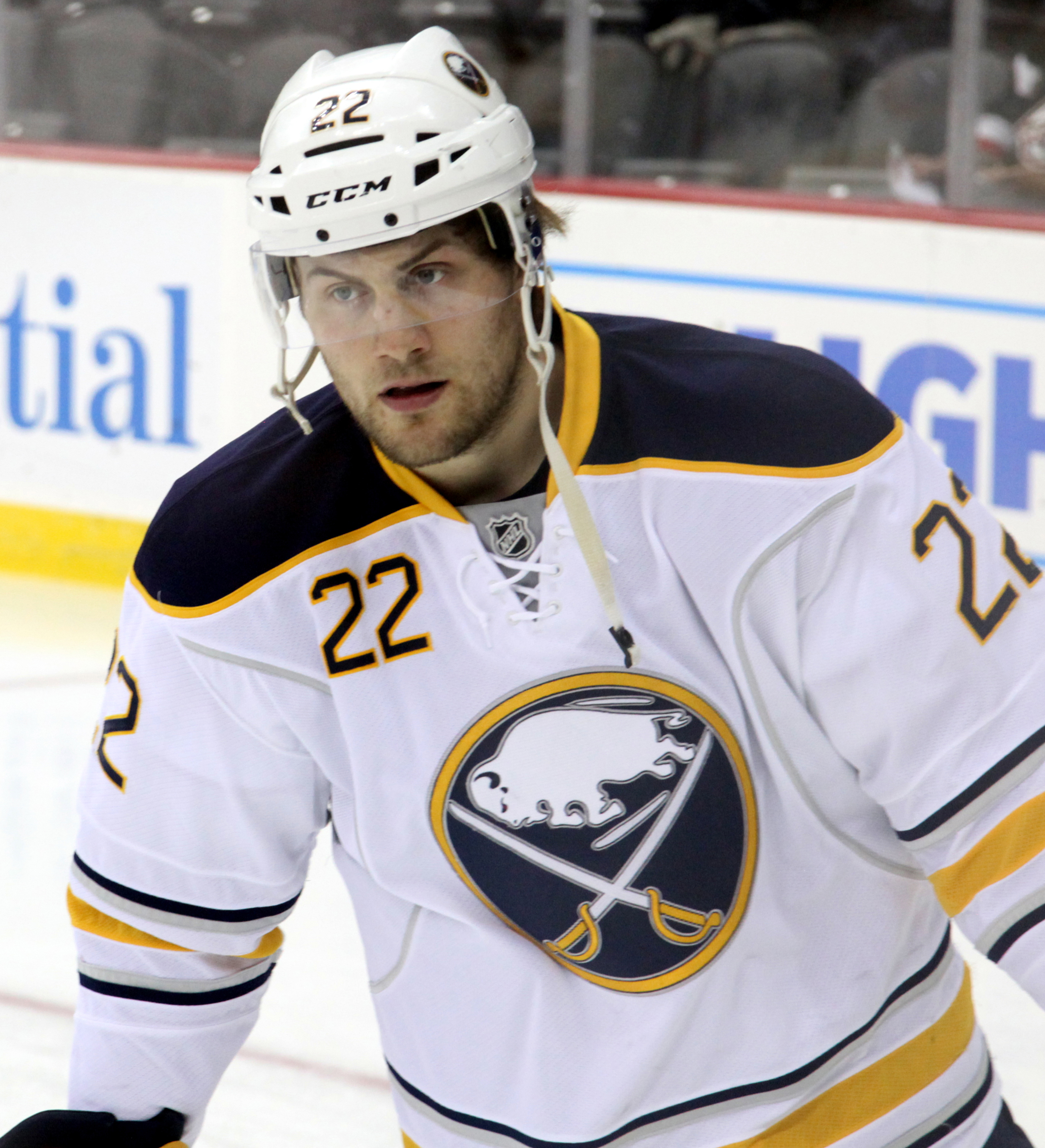
- Larsson with the Buffalo Sabres in 2016
- Born: 25 July 1992 (age 34) Lau, Sweden
- Height: 5 ft 11 in (180 cm)
- Weight: 202 lb (92 kg; 14 st 6 lb)
- Position: Left wing
- Shoots: Left
- SHL team Former teams: Brynäs IF; Minnesota Wild; Buffalo Sabres; Arizona Coyotes; Washington Capitals
- National team: Sweden
- NHL draft: 56th overall, 2010; Minnesota Wild
- Playing career: 2010–present

Johan Oskar Torgny Larsson (born 25 July 1992) is a Swedish professional ice hockey forward and team captain for Brynäs IF of the Swedish Hockey League (SHL). He has previously played with the Minnesota Wild, Buffalo Sabres, Arizona Coyotes and Washington Capitals of the National Hockey League (NHL).

== Playing career ==
Larsson was drafted in the second round, 56th overall, by the Minnesota Wild of the National Hockey League (NHL) in the 2010 NHL entry draft. The same year, Larsson was also drafted in the fifth round of the 2010 KHL Junior Draft, as 111th overall, by the Metallurg Novokuznetsk.

Larsson made his Elitserien debut on 16 September 2010 against Modo Hockey. A week later, on September 23, against Djurgårdens IF, he recorded his first Elitserien point, being the second assist in a goal, tying the game 2–2. His first Elitserien goal was scored on January 15, 2011, against goaltender Joacim Eriksson of Skellefteå AIK.

On 1 October 2010, Larsson signed a two-year contract with Brynäs IF's elite team, which expired after the 2011–12 Elitserien season. Larsson's seven goals and 15 assists in the first 29 games of the 2011–12 season led to a nomination for that season's Elitserien Rookie of the Year award. He would then win the award. With 9 points in 16 playoff games, his team went on to win the Swedish Championship that year.

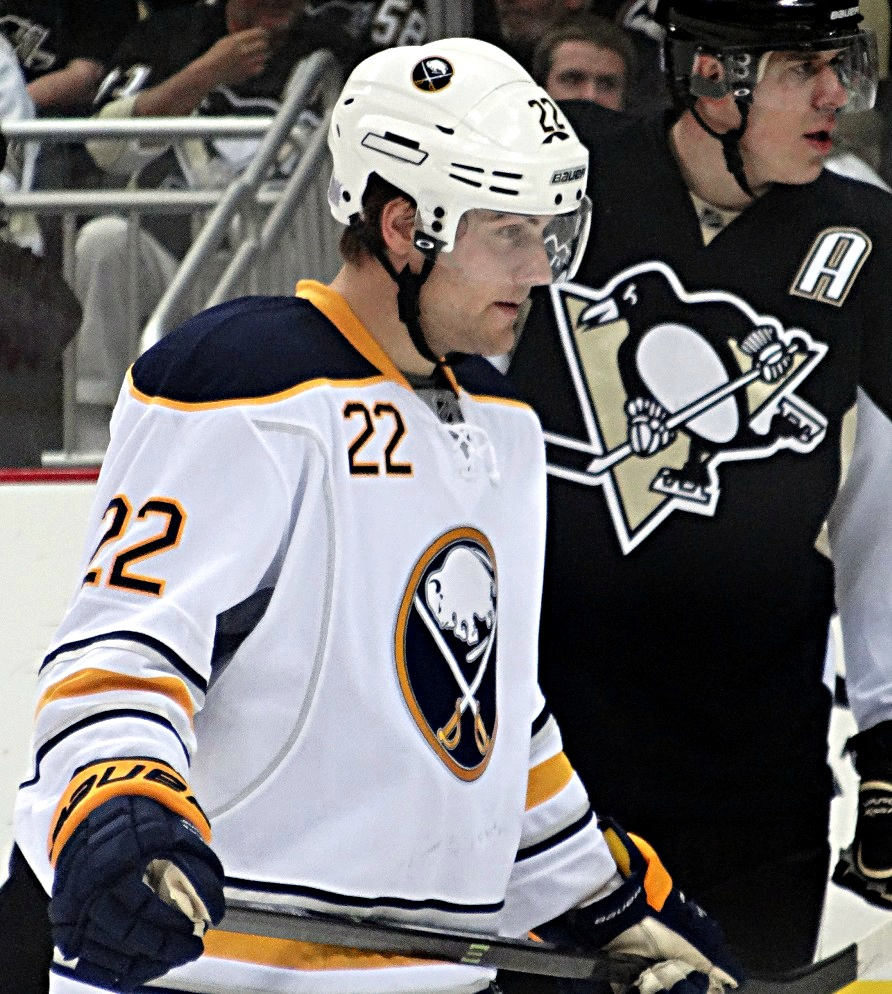
Larsson in April 2013

On 18 May 2011, Larsson signed a three-year contract with the Minnesota Wild, but was loaned to Brynäs for the 2011–12 season.

With the intention of pursuing his NHL career, Larsson relocated to North America, and was directly assigned to the Wild's American Hockey League (AHL) affiliate, the Houston Aeros, to begin the 2012–13 season due to the lockout. Larsson was recalled to the Wild during the shortened season as an injury replacement and made his NHL debut against the Detroit Red Wings on February 17, 2013.

On 3 April 2013 at the trade deadline, Larsson was acquired by the Buffalo Sabres along with goaltender Matt Hackett, a first-round pick in 2013 (Nikita Zadorov) and a second-round pick in 2014 (Brycen Martin) from the Wild in exchange for Jason Pominville and a fourth-round pick in 2014. Larsson played for the Sabres' AHL affiliate Rochester Americans at the 2013 Spengler Cup.

Larsson has on several occasions participated in Sweden's national teams, including the junior teams as well as the senior team. In the 2010 World U18 Championships, Larsson and his Sweden were placed second after the United States, losing the final against them.

The Sabres re-signed Larsson in the summer before the 2017–18 season to a two-year, $1.475 million contract. During the 2017–18 season, Larsson was suspended for two games on 2 February 2018 for cross checking Vincent Trocheck in a 4–2 loss to the Florida Panthers.

On 12 July 2019, the Sabres re-signed Larsson to a one-year, $1.55 million contract extension. In his eighth year within the Sabres organization in the 2019–20 season, Larsson recorded 6 goals and a career NHL high 18 points in 62 games before the season was paused and effectively ended due to the COVID-19 pandemic.

On 10 October 2020, as an unrestricted free agent from the Sabres, Larsson opted to sign a two-year, $2.8 million contract with the Arizona Coyotes.

On 21 March 2022, the day of the NHL trade deadline, the Arizona Coyotes traded Larsson to the Washington Capitals in exchange for a third-round pick. Larsson having been injured while traded by the Coyotes later returned to health and played out the remainder of the 2021–22 season with the Capitals, contributing with 6 points in 14 regular season games. He made his NHL playoff debut in the post-season, adding two assists through 6 games.

On 12 August 2022, Larsson as a free agent halted his NHL career in opting to return to his original Swedish club, Brynäs IF of the SHL, after signing a three-year, $930,000 contract.

== International play ==
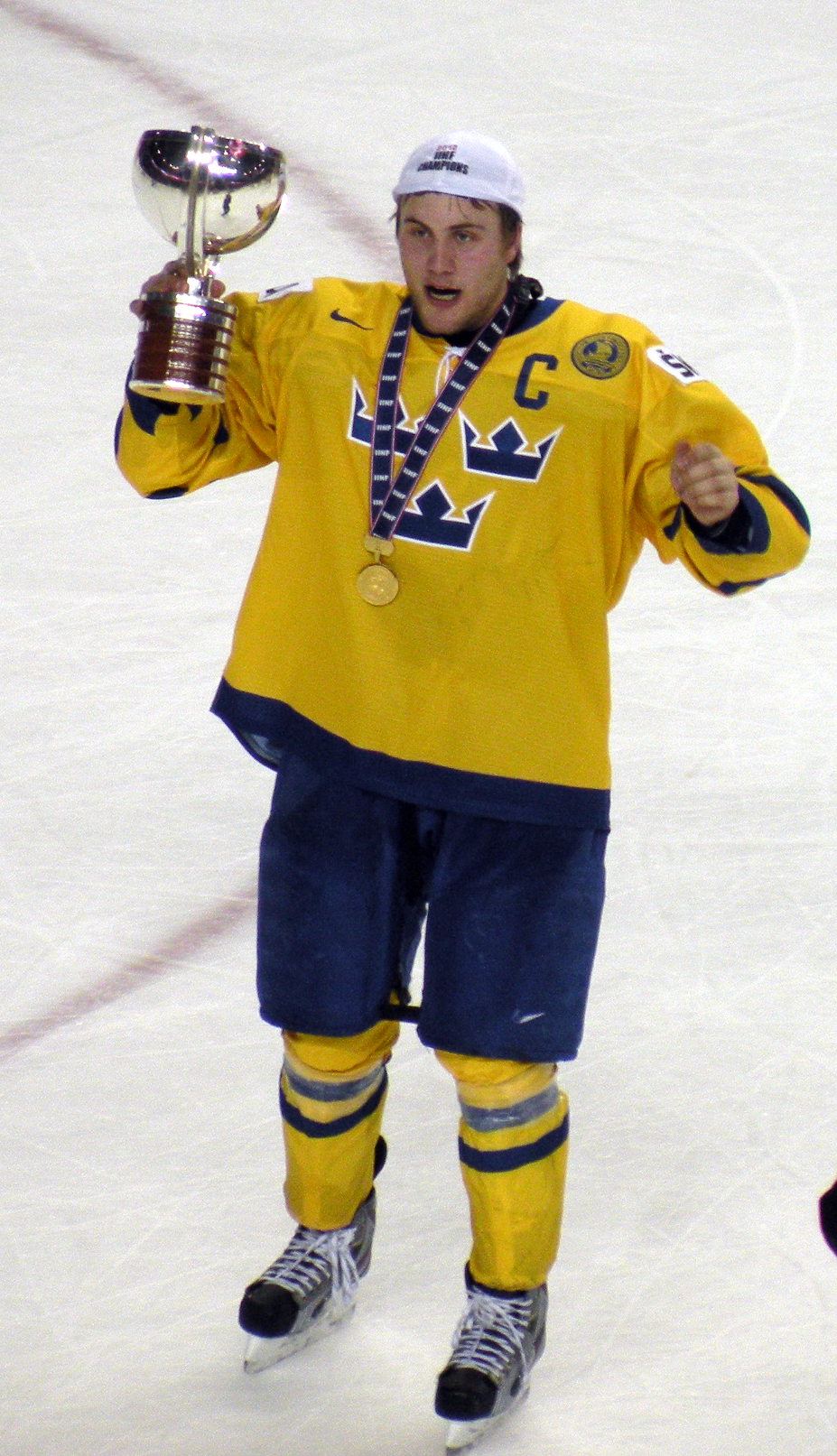
- Larsson celebrates after winning the 2012 World Junior Hockey Championship.

Medal record

Representing Sweden

Ice hockey

World Championships
Gold medal – first place	2018 Denmark	

World Junior Championships
Gold medal – first place	2012 Calgary	

IIHF U18 Championships
Silver medal – second place	2010 Minsk	

On 30 March 2011, Larsson made his senior national team debut in an exhibition game against Latvia which ended 4–1 in Sweden's favour. In the 2012 World J20 Championships, he was the captain when Sweden won its first J20 gold medal since 1981, its second overall.

== Career statistics ==
=== Regular season and playoffs ===
			Regular season					Playoffs
Season	Team	League	GP	G	A	Pts	PIM	GP	G	A	Pts	PIM
2005–06	Sudrets HC	SWE.4	2	0	2	2	2	—	—	—	—	—
2006–07	Sudrets HC	SWE.4	29	13	7	20	40	—	—	—	—	—
2007–08	Sudrets HC	SWE.4	25	11	11	22	71	—	—	—	—	—
2008–09	Brynäs IF	J18	4	3	1	4	27	3	0	3	3	2
2008–09	Brynäs IF	J18 Allsv	7	3	3	6	49	—	—	—	—	—
2008–09	Brynäs IF	J20	33	4	5	9	55	5	0	0	0	2
2009–10	Brynäs IF	J18	1	0	0	0	0	—	—	—	—	—
2009–10	Brynäs IF	J18 Allsv	3	1	1	2	2	4	4	4	8	6
2009–10	Brynäs IF	J20	40	15	19	34	80	5	1	1	2	2
2010–11	Brynäs IF	SEL	43	4	4	8	18	5	0	2	2	4
2011–12	Brynäs IF	SEL	49	12	24	36	34	16	2	7	9	16
2012–13	Houston Aeros	AHL	62	15	22	37	38	—	—	—	—	—
2012–13	Minnesota Wild	NHL	1	0	0	0	0	—	—	—	—	—
2012–13	Rochester Americans	AHL	7	1	3	4	2	3	0	3	3	6
2013–14	Buffalo Sabres	NHL	28	0	4	4	19	—	—	—	—	—
2013–14	Rochester Americans	AHL	51	15	26	41	75	5	1	2	3	4
2014–15	Rochester Americans	AHL	44	15	25	40	38	—	—	—	—	—
2014–15	Buffalo Sabres	NHL	39	6	10	16	12	—	—	—	—	—
2015–16	Buffalo Sabres	NHL	74	10	7	17	27	—	—	—	—	—
2016–17	Buffalo Sabres	NHL	36	6	5	11	20	—	—	—	—	—
2017–18	Buffalo Sabres	NHL	80	4	13	17	49	—	—	—	—	—
2018–19	Buffalo Sabres	NHL	73	6	8	14	37	—	—	—	—	—
2019–20	Buffalo Sabres	NHL	62	6	12	18	26	—	—	—	—	—
2020–21	Arizona Coyotes	NHL	52	8	6	14	24	—	—	—	—	—
2021–22	Arizona Coyotes	NHL	29	6	9	15	30	—	—	—	—	—
2021–22	Washington Capitals	NHL	14	1	5	6	2	6	0	2	2	2
2022–23	Brynäs IF	SHL	45	9	22	31	53	—	—	—	—	—
2023–24	Brynäs IF	Allsv	44	17	23	40	49	13	2	6	8	4
2024–25	Brynäs IF	SHL	52	13	21	34	36	16	2	7	9	8
SHL totals			189	38	71	109	141	37	4	16	20	28
NHL totals			488	53	79	132	246	6	0	2	2	2

=== International ===
Year	Team	Event	Result	GP	G	A	Pts	PIM
2010	Sweden	U18	2nd place, silver medalist(s)	5	6	8	14	0
2011	Sweden	WJC	4th	6	1	3	4	4
2012	Sweden	WJC	1st place, gold medalist(s)	6	0	6	6	0
2012	Sweden	WC	6th	7	0	2	2	0
2018	Sweden	WC	1st place, gold medalist(s)	10	0	1	1	2
Junior totals				17	7	17	24	4
Senior totals				17	0	3	3	2

== Awards and honours ==
Award	Year
IIHF World U18 Championships First Team All-Star	2010

Awards and achievements
Preceded by Mattias Ekholm	Winner of the SHL Rookie of the Year award 2012	Succeeded by William Karlsson
