= Markus Nordlund =

Finnish ice hockey player

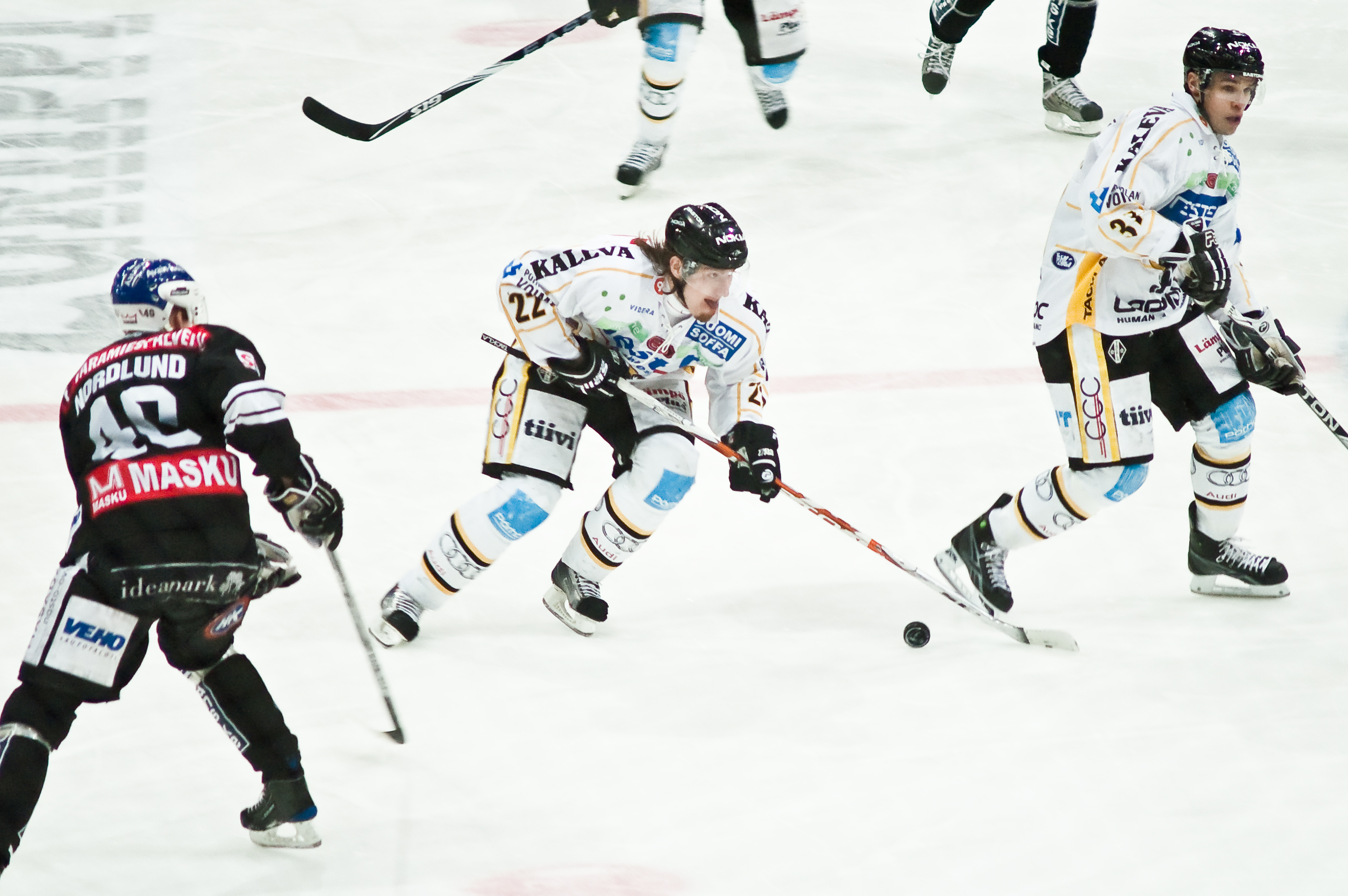
- Markus Nordlund, 2009 (on the left, in a black jersey)
- Born: July 27, 1985 (age 40); Eurajoki, Finland
- Height: 6 ft 5 in (196 cm)
- Weight: 209 lb (95 kg; 14 st 13 lb)
- Position: Defence
- Shot: Left
- Played for: Lukko; KalPa; HC TPS; Jokerit; HC Ambrì-Piotta; Djurgårdens IF; Vaasan Sport; Krefeld Pinguine; HC Bolzano
- Playing career: 2005–2019

Markus Nordlund (born July 27, 1985) is a Finnish ice hockey player who currently plays professionally at Vaasan Sport.

== Career ==
After playing for the Lukko youth teams, Nordlund logged his first minutes in Finnland's top-division Liiga during the 2005–06 season with Lukko.

In 2008, he transferred to fellow Liiga team HC TPS and won the Finnish championship with the club in 2010. After the 2010–11 season, which he also spent with HC TPS, Nordlund was presented with the Juha Rantasila Trophy as the top-scoring defenseman of the league.

From 2011 to 2013, he played with Jokerit Helsinki, before moving to HC Ambrì-Piotta of the Swiss NLA in September 2013. He was brought in to replace injured Maxim Noreau and then stayed with the team for the remainder of the season. In December 2013, he strengthened the roster of Genève-Servette HC at the Spengler Cup and helped win the title, while being named to the Spengler Cup All Star Team.

The 2014–15 season saw him skate in the Swedish Hockey League with Djurgårdens IF.

Nordlund returned to HC Ambrì-Piotta in November 2015. He then signed with Vaasan Sport of the Finnish Liiga for the 2016–17 season.

== International career ==
Nordlund made his debut with Finnland's national team during the 2010 Euro Hockey Tour.

== Career statistics ==
			Regular season					Playoffs
Season	Team	League	GP	G	A	Pts	PIM	GP	G	A	Pts	PIM
2005–06	Lukko	Liiga	28	2	1	3	0	—	—	—	—	—
2005–06	Hokki	Mestis	3	0	0	0	0	—	—	—	—	—
2006–07	FPS	Mestis	13	2	11	13	22	—	—	—	—	—
2006–07	KalPa	Liiga	13	0	0	0	4	—	—	—	—	—
2006–07	Lukko	Liiga	11	1	3	4	0	—	—	—	—	—
2007–08	Lukko	Liiga	51	1	11	12	10	3	0	2	2	2
2008–09	HC TPS	Liiga	56	9	13	22	28	7	0	3	3	4
2009–10	HC TPS	Liiga	58	6	15	21	24	15	4	4	8	6
2010–11	HC TPS	Liiga	55	16	20	36	14	—	—	—	—	—
2011–12	Jokerit	Liiga	57	5	16	21	20	10	2	3	5	6
2012–13	Jokerit	Liiga	44	5	13	18	37	6	0	1	1	12
2013–14	Kiekko-Vantaa	Mestis	4	0	1	1	27	—	—	—	—	—
2013–14	HC Ambrì-Piotta	NLA	35	4	10	14	12	2	0	0	0	0
2014–15	Djurgårdens IF	SHL	45	2	11	13	26	1	0	0	0	0
2015–16	HC Ambrì-Piotta	NLA	9	1	2	3	0	—	—	—	—	—
2016–17	Vaasan Sport	Liiga	59	3	13	16	12	—	—	—	—	—
2017–18	Krefeld Pinguine	DEL	50	6	19	25	16	—	—	—	—	—
2018–19	HC Bolzano	EBEL	53	9	18	27	8	4	2	4	6	0
Liiga totals			432	48	105	153	149	41	6	13	19	30
