= Ville Koistinen =

Finnish ice hockey player (born 1982)

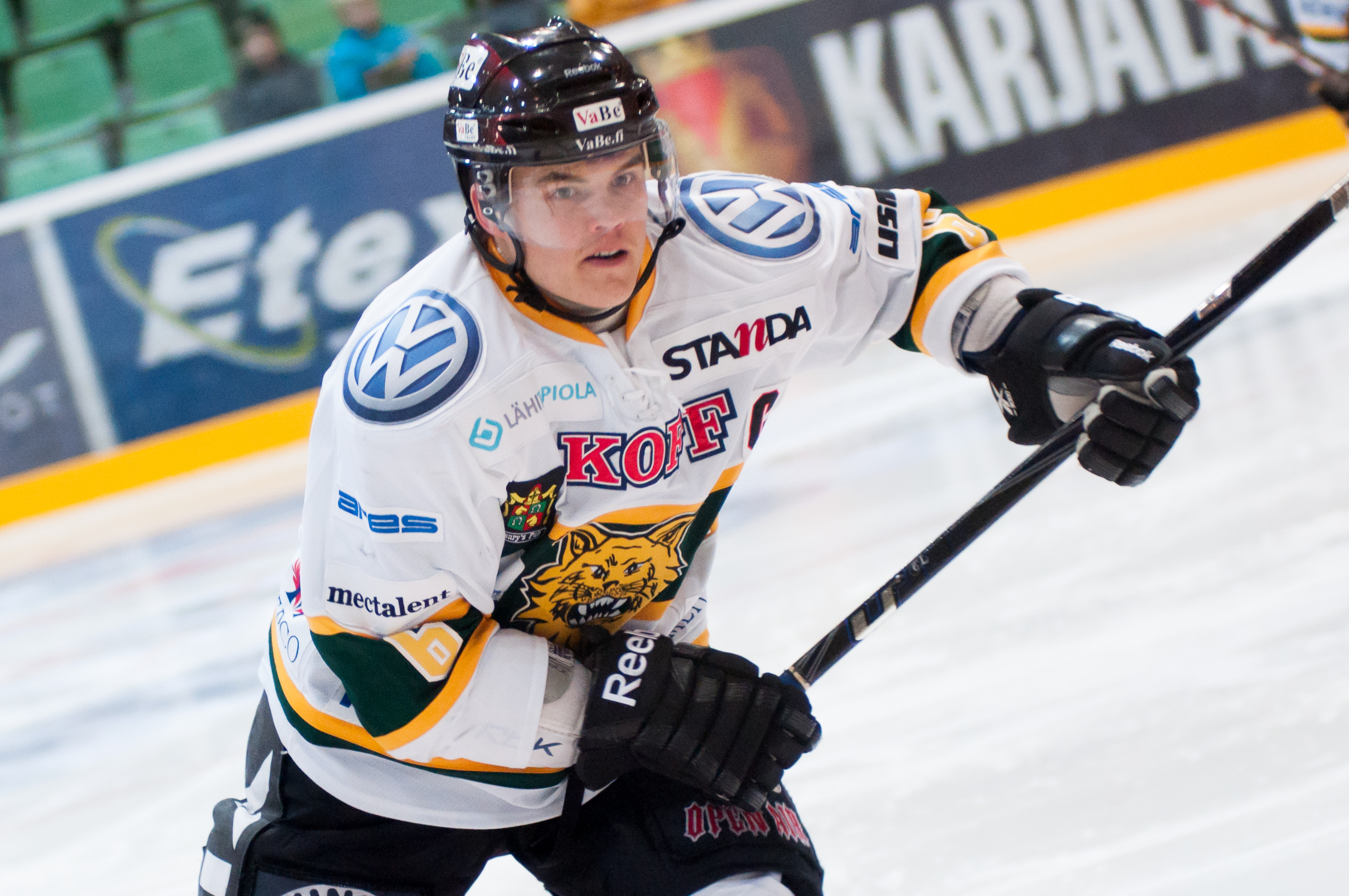
- Born: June 17, 1982 (age 44) Oulu, Finland
- Height: 5 ft 11 in (180 cm)
- Weight: 200 lb (91 kg; 14 st 4 lb)
- Position: Defence
- Shot: Left
- Played for: Ilves Tampere; Nashville Predators; Florida Panthers; Skellefteå AIK; Salavat Yulaev Ufa; HC Davos; SCL Tigers; ERC Ingolstadt; HC Sparta Praha; HPK; Kittilän Palloseura
- National team: Finland
- NHL draft: Undrafted
- Playing career: 2000–2021

Ville Koistinen (born July 17, 1982) is a Finnish former professional ice hockey defenceman who played in the National Hockey League (NHL) with the Nashville Predators and Florida Panthers.

== Playing career ==
Undrafted, Koistinen played professionally in his native Finland with Ilves Tampere of the SM-liiga for 6 seasons. On May 18, 2006, Koistinen signed with the Nashville Predators of the NHL. Koistinen made his North American debut in the 2006–07 season, playing with the Predators affiliate, the Milwaukee Admirals. He was chosen to AHL-All Star Classic that year scoring 9 goals and 41 points in 59 games.

Koistinen signed a 1-year contract with Predators for the 2007–08 . Koistinen scored his first NHL goal against Fredrik Norrena of the Columbus Blue Jackets in a 4–3 victory on December 27, 2007. Koistinen established 17 points by season end.

After his second season with the Predators in 2008–09, Koistinen signed a two-year contract with the Florida Panthers on July 1, 2009.

On November 25, the Florida Panthers placed Koistinen on waivers. Koistinen cleared waivers on November 26 and was sent to Florida's AHL affiliate in Rochester, New York.

His contract was bought out in the summer, leaving Koistinen as a free agent. He signed a 1-year contract back to Europe and to Swedish Elitserien club, Skellefteå AIK. Club placed second overall by losing Elitserien finals to Färjestads BK.

In the 2011–12 season Koistinen signed one of the biggest contracts so far in Finnish elite league SM-liiga by signing a 7-year deal with Ilves Tampere. During the regular season after 28 games scoring 7 goals and 17 points, KHL team Salavat Yulajev Ufa signed Koistinen to a 2-year deal. His contract with Ilves Tampere continues after the 2-year KHL contract.

In 2013 Koistinen elected to sign a one-year contract with HC Davos of the National League A. In 2014 Koistinen chose to revoke his contract with Ilves Tampere and signed a 3-year extension with HC Davos until 2017. After two seasons with Davos, Koistinen opted to leave the club and sign a one-year deal with fellow Swiss club, the SCL Tigers on May 19, 2015. He eventually played for SCL until the end of 2017. On January 2, 2018, he moved to ERC Ingolstadt of the German DEL.

After 20 professional seasons, and enduring multiple injuries, Koistinen announced his retirement on 3 April 2021.

== International play ==
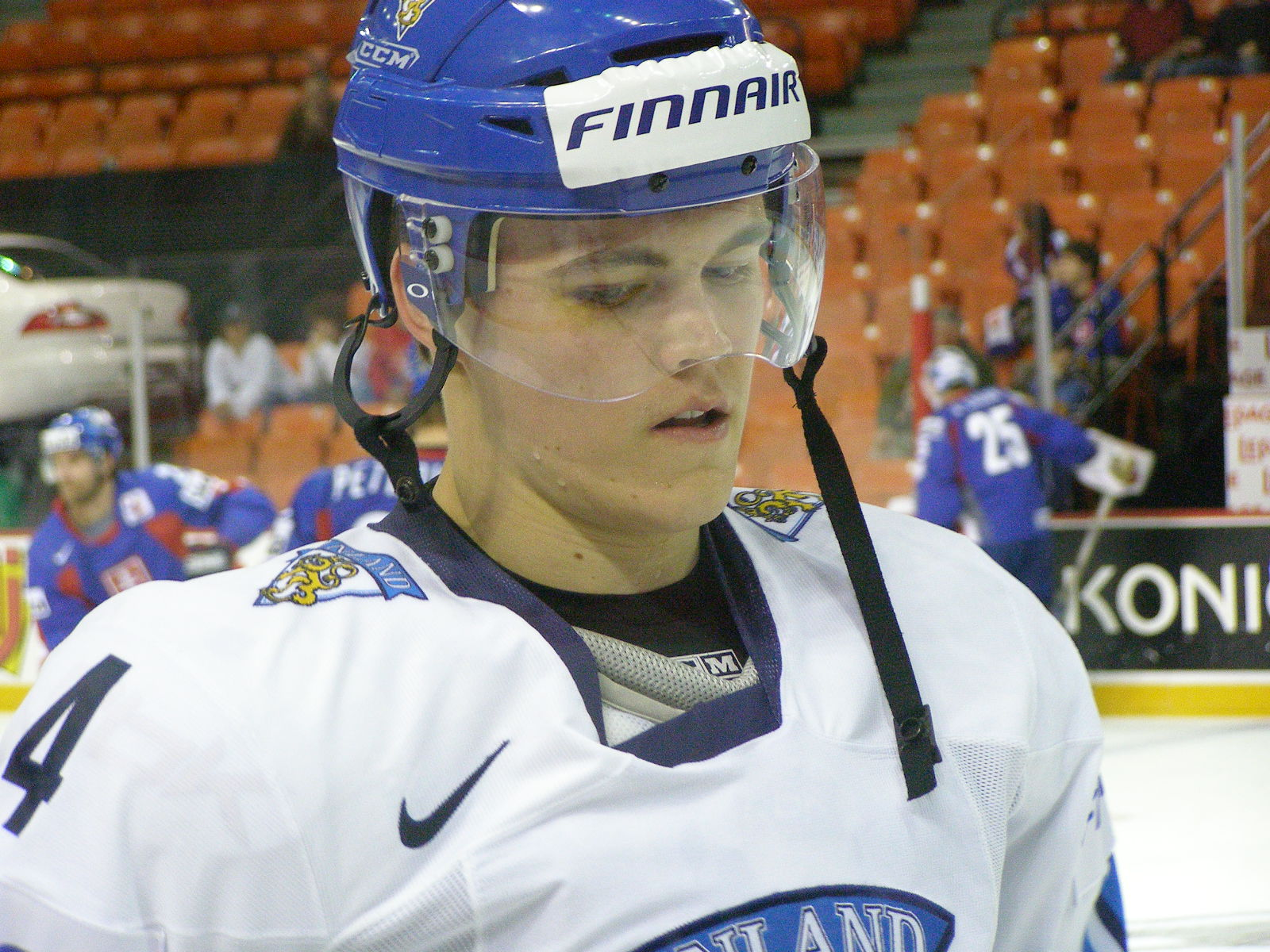

Medal record

Representing Finland

Ice hockey

World Championships
Silver medal – second place	2007 Moscow	
Bronze medal – third place	2008 Quebec	

Koistinen participated World Ice Hockey Championships 2007, 2008 and 2009 and helped Team Finland to a silver medal in 2007 and bronze medal in 2008.

== Personal ==
In June 2018, Koistinen was convicted of domestic abuse in Finland after he was found guilty of hitting, kicking, and strangling his wife, the couple had been married since 2007 and have two children. It was also revealed that his sudden departure from SCL Tigers six months earlier was due to an extramarital affair with a young woman working for the club.

== Career statistics ==
=== Regular season and playoffs ===
			Regular season					Playoffs
Season	Team	League	GP	G	A	Pts	PIM	GP	G	A	Pts	PIM
2000–01	Ilves Tampere	SM-l	6	0	0	0	0	5	0	1	1	0
2001–02	Ilves Tampere	SM-l	53	1	8	9	42	—	—	—	—	—
2002–03	Ilves Tampere	SM-l	18	4	1	5	8	—	—	—	—	—
2003–04	Ilves Tampere	SM-l	54	7	16	23	51	7	0	2	2	0
2004–05	Ilves Tampere	SM-l	52	6	14	20	69	3	0	0	0	0
2005–06	Ilves Tampere	SM-l	56	8	26	34	70	4	0	1	1	2
2006–07	Milwaukee Admirals	AHL	59	9	32	41	44	4	0	2	2	4
2007–08	Nashville Predators	NHL	48	4	13	17	18	—	—	—	—	—
2008–09	Nashville Predators	NHL	38	3	8	11	14	—	—	—	—	—
2009–10	Florida Panthers	NHL	17	1	3	4	8	—	—	—	—	—
2009–10	Rochester Americans	AHL	8	1	1	2	4	—	—	—	—	—
2010–11	Skellefteå AIK	SEL	31	4	8	12	28	—	—	—	—	—
2011–12	Ilves Tampere	SM-l	28	7	10	17	18	—	—	—	—	—
2011–12	Salavat Yulaev Ufa	KHL	3	0	0	0	2	2	0	0	0	2
2012–13	Ilves Tampere	SM-l	49	7	7	14	38	—	—	—	—	—
2013–14	HC Davos	NLA	43	8	10	18	34	6	0	3	3	2
2014–15	HC Davos	NLA	40	5	13	18	34	—	—	—	—	—
2015–16	SCL Tigers	NLA	46	6	18	24	78	—	—	—	—	—
2016–17	SCL Tigers	NLA	46	6	23	29	46	—	—	—	—	—
2017–18	SCL Tigers	NL	30	7	11	18	35	—	—	—	—	—
2017–18	ERC Ingolstadt	DEL	15	3	13	16	2	5	2	4	6	6
2018–19	ERC Ingolstadt	DEL	49	7	17	24	56	6	0	5	5	14
2019–20	ERC Ingolstadt	DEL	23	3	7	10	22	—	—	—	—	—
2019–20	HC Sparta Praha	ELH	7	0	1	1	0	—	—	—	—	—
2020–21	HPK	Liiga	8	1	2	3	4	—	—	—	—	—
NHL totals			103	8	24	32	40	—	—	—	—	—

=== International ===
Year	Team	Event	Result	GP	G	A	Pts	PIM
2007	Finland	WC	2nd place, silver medalist(s)	2	0	0	0	2
2008	Finland	WC	3rd place, bronze medalist(s)	9	1	1	2	4
2009	Finland	WC	5th	4	1	2	3	4
Senior totals				15	2	3	5	10
