= Richard Stehlík =

Slovak ice hockey player

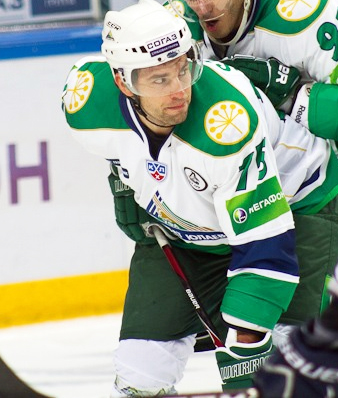
- Born: June 22, 1984 (age 41) Skalica, Czechoslovakia
- Height: 6 ft 5 in (196 cm)
- Weight: 243 lb (110 kg; 17 st 5 lb)
- Position: Defence
- Shot: Left
- Played for: HK 36 Skalica; HK Dukla Trenčín; HC Sparta Praha; Milwaukee Admirals; HC Vítkovice Steel; HC Kometa Brno; Salavat Yulaev Ufa; Atlant Moscow Oblast; MODO Hockey; EC VSV; HC Oceláři Třinec; HPK; MHk 32 Liptovský Mikuláš; Dragons de Rouen
- National team: Slovakia
- NHL draft: 76th overall, 2003; Nashville Predators
- Playing career: 2000–2020

Richard Stehlík (born June 22, 1984) is a Slovak ice hockey coach and former professional ice hockey defenceman who is currently an assistant coach for HK 32 Liptovský Mikuláš of the Slovak Extraliga.

Stehlik was selected by the Nashville Predators in the 3rd round (76th overall) of the 2003 NHL entry draft.

Stehlík previously played for HK 36 Skalica, Sherbrooke Beavers, HK Dukla Trenčín, HC Sparta Praha and HC Vítkovice Steel.

== Career statistics ==
=== Regular season and playoffs ===
			Regular season					Playoffs
Season	Team	League	GP	G	A	Pts	PIM	GP	G	A	Pts	PIM
1998–99	HK 36 Skalica	SVK U18	9	1	1	2	2	—	—	—	—	—
1999–2000	HK 36 Skalica	SVK U20	48	3	5	8	92	—	—	—	—	—
2000–01	HK 36 Skalica	SVK U20	11	1	5	6	18	—	—	—	—	—
2000–01	HK 36 Skalica	SVK	45	1	1	2	14	—	—	—	—	—
2001–02	HK 36 Skalica	SVK	35	1	0	1	12	3	0	0	0	2
2002–03	Sherbrooke Castors	QMJHL	43	8	16	24	105	12	1	5	6	20
2003–04	Lewiston MAINEiacs	QMJHL	44	11	25	36	109	7	0	1	1	12
2004–05	HK 36 Skalica	SVK	40	8	3	11	28	—	—	—	—	—
2004–05	Dukla Trenčín	SVK	13	1	5	6	33	12	3	3	6	62
2005–06	HC Sparta Praha	ELH	42	3	7	10	79	17	0	2	2	18
2006–07	HC Sparta Praha	ELH	42	8	1	9	75	16	0	0	0	22
2007–08	Milwaukee Admirals	AHL	14	1	0	1	12	—	—	—	—	—
2007–08	HC Sparta Praha	ELH	10	0	0	0	20	3	0	0	0	4
2008–09	HC Vítkovice Steel	ELH	49	3	10	13	67	10	1	1	2	4
2009–10	HC Vítkovice Steel	ELH	46	7	10	17	38	12	1	3	4	16
2010–11	HC Kometa Brno	ELH	49	10	9	19	53	—	—	—	—	—
2011–12	Salavat Yulaev Ufa	KHL	24	4	1	5	8	—	—	—	—	—
2011–12	Atlant Moscow Oblast	KHL	7	0	0	0	6	2	0	0	0	0
2012–13	Modo Hockey	SEL	22	0	1	1	27	—	—	—	—	—
2012–13	HC Vítkovice Steel	ELH	22	2	1	3	12	11	0	2	2	10
2013–14	HC Vítkovice Steel	ELH	45	7	11	18	65	8	2	2	4	4
2014–15	HC Vítkovice Steel	ELH	41	4	14	18	32	4	1	1	2	4
2015–16	HC Kometa Brno	ELH	19	0	2	2	12	—	—	—	—	—
2015–16	EC VSV	AUT	1	0	0	0	0	—	—	—	—	—
2015–16	HC Oceláři Třinec	ELH	8	0	1	1	6	2	0	0	0	2
2016–17	HPK	Liiga	5	0	0	0	0	—	—	—	—	—
2016–17	MHk 32 Liptovský Mikuláš	SVK	32	4	2	6	34	—	—	—	—	—
2017–18	Dragons de Rouen	FRA	40	9	6	15	74	13	1	2	3	35
2019–20	MHk 32 Liptovský Mikuláš	SVK	16	4	0	4	46	—	—	—	—	—
SVK totals			181	19	11	30	167	15	3	3	6	64
ELH totals			373	44	66	110	459	83	5	11	16	84

=== International ===
Year	Team	Event	GP	G	A	Pts	PIM
2001	Slovakia	WJC18	6	1	0	1	4
2002	Slovakia	WJC	7	0	1	1	10
2002	Slovakia	WJC18	8	3	3	6	10
2003	Slovakia	WJC	6	0	3	3	8
2004	Slovakia	WJC	6	1	1	2	8
2006	Slovakia	WC	7	0	0	0	2
2007	Slovakia	WC	6	0	1	1	2
Junior totals			33	5	8	13	40
Senior totals			13	0	1	1	4
