= Roland Gerber (ice hockey) =

Swiss ice hockey player

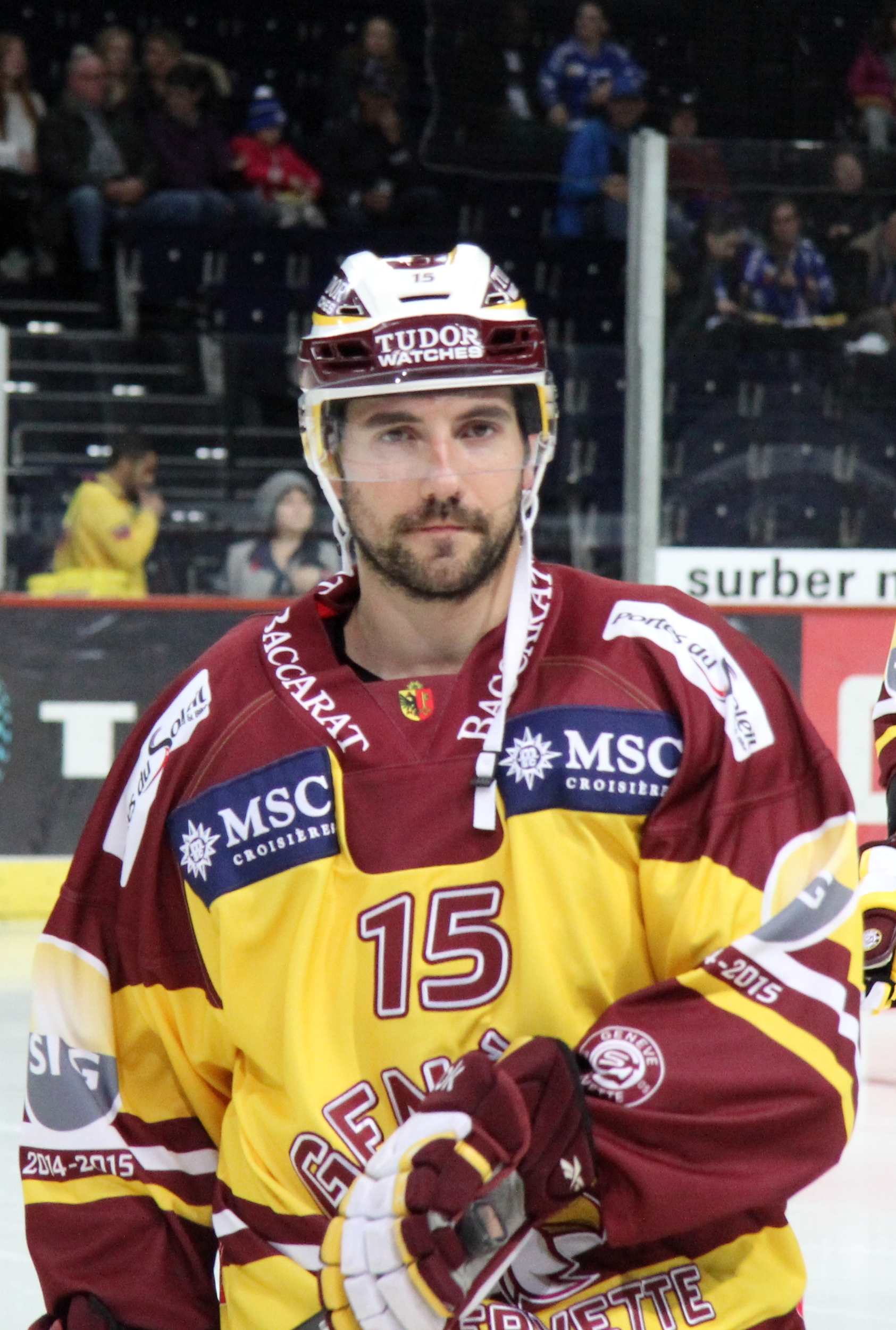
- Born: May 21, 1984 (age 41) Langnau, Switzerland
- Height: 6 ft 1 in (185 cm)
- Weight: 203 lb (92 kg; 14 st 7 lb)
- Position: Forward
- Shoots: Right
- NL team Former teams: Free Agent; SCL Tigers; ZSC Lions; SC Bern; Genève-Servette HC
- Playing career: 2001–present

Roland Gerber (born May 21, 1984) is a Swiss professional ice hockey player. Gerber is currently an unrestricted free agent who most recently played with SCL Tigers of the Swiss National League (NL).

Gerber made his National League A debut playing with SC Langnau during the 2001–02 NLA season.
