= Daniel Catenacci =

Canadian-Italian ice hockey player

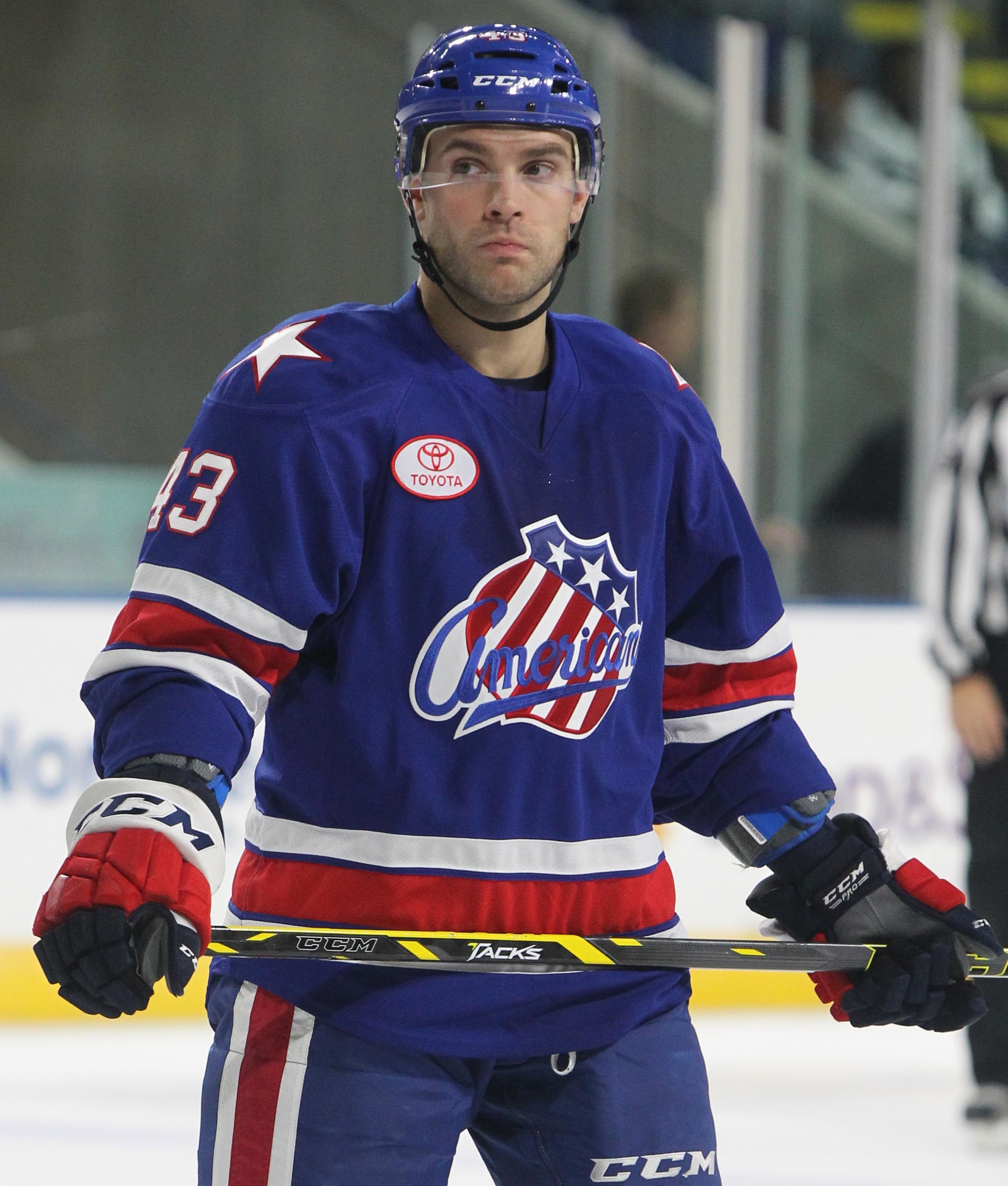
- Catenacci with the Rochester Americans in 2015
- Born: March 9, 1993 (age 33) Richmond Hill, Ontario, Canada
- Height: 5 ft 10 in (178 cm)
- Weight: 191 lb (87 kg; 13 st 9 lb)
- Position: Centre
- Shoots: Left
- EIHL team Former teams: Guildford Flames; Buffalo Sabres; New York Rangers; HC Bolzano; HC Pustertal Wölfe
- National team: Italy
- NHL draft: 77th overall, 2011; Buffalo Sabres
- Playing career: 2013–present

Daniel Catenacci (born March 9, 1993) is an Italian-Canadian professional ice hockey centre who is currently playing with Guildford Flames in the UK's Elite Ice Hockey League (EIHL). He has formerly played in the National Hockey League (NHL) with the Buffalo Sabres and New York Rangers.

== Playing career ==
=== Junior ===
Catenacci was selected first overall by the Sault Ste. Marie Greyhounds in the 2009 Ontario Hockey League Draft from the York Simcoe Express minor midget AAA team.

After two seasons with the Greyhounds, he was traded to the Owen Sound Attack in August 2011 in exchange for Andrew Fritsch, Michael Schumacher and a second-round draft pick.

=== Professional ===
Catenacci was drafted in the third round, 77th overall, by the Buffalo Sabres in the 2011 NHL entry draft. He made his professional debut with the Rochester Americans during the 2013 American Hockey League playoffs. During the 2013-2014 season, Catenacci also competed for Rochester in the 2013 Spengler Cup, scoring one goal in the quarterfinal.

On February 5, 2016, Catenacci was recalled from the minors by the Sabres. He made his debut with the Sabres the next night in a game against the Boston Bruins. In his third game, against the Philadelphia Flyers, Catenacci was injured by a check from Radko Gudas. After spending a week on the injured reserve list, Catenacci was reassigned to Rochester on February 19. On March 1, 2016, Catenacci was once again recalled by the Sabres. He finished the season playing in 11 games with Buffalo, scoring no points.

During the 2016–17 season, Catenacci was dealt by the Sabres at the trade deadline to the New York Rangers in exchange for defenseman Mat Bodie on February 28, 2017.

As a free agent from the Rangers, following parts of two seasons with the club, Catenacci left North America after his first 6 professional seasons in agreeing to a one-year contract with Italian club, HCB South Tyrol of the EBEL on July 19, 2018. He continued playing at the club until the end of season 2021/22. In April 2022 HC Pustertal announced the signing of Catenacci.

In July 2024, Catenacci agreed terms on a one-year deal with UK Elite Ice Hockey League side Guildford Flames.

== Career statistics ==
=== Regular season and playoffs ===
			Regular season					Playoffs
Season	Team	League	GP	G	A	Pts	PIM	GP	G	A	Pts	PIM
2008–09	Villanova Knights	OJHL	2	1	0	1	4	—	—	—	—	—
2009–10	Sault Ste. Marie Greyhounds	OHL	65	10	20	30	68	5	1	1	2	6
2010–11	Sault Ste. Marie Greyhounds	OHL	67	26	45	71	117	—	—	—	—	—
2011–12	Owen Sound Attack	OHL	67	33	39	72	114	5	1	3	4	8
2012–13	Owen Sound Attack	OHL	67	38	41	79	115	12	3	6	9	32
2012–13	Rochester Americans	AHL	2	1	2	3	0	—	—	—	—	—
2013–14	Rochester Americans	AHL	76	10	10	20	32	2	0	0	0	0
2014–15	Rochester Americans	AHL	68	15	14	29	60	—	—	—	—	—
2015–16	Rochester Americans	AHL	50	12	12	24	39	—	—	—	—	—
2015–16	Buffalo Sabres	NHL	11	0	0	0	0	—	—	—	—	—
2016–17	Rochester Americans	AHL	50	5	8	13	44	—	—	—	—	—
2016–17	Hartford Wolf Pack	AHL	19	4	5	9	26	—	—	—	—	—
2017–18	Hartford Wolf Pack	AHL	42	5	10	15	31	—	—	—	—	—
2017–18	New York Rangers	NHL	1	0	0	0	0	—	—	—	—	—
2018–19	HC Bolzano	EBEL	49	11	16	27	40	5	0	2	2	2
2019–20	HC Bolzano	EBEL	35	6	14	20	28	—	—	—	—	—
2020–21	HC Bolzano	ICEHL	40	18	10	28	77	16	2	5	7	26
2021–22	HC Bolzano	ICEHL	43	7	17	24	36	2	0	1	1	2
2022–23	HC Pustertal Wölfe	ICEHL	40	10	13	23	36	—	—	—	—	—
2023–24	HC Pustertal Wölfe	ICEHL	25	2	8	10	18	12	4	2	6	31
NHL totals			12	0	0	0	0	—	—	—	—	—

=== International ===
Year	Team	Event	Result	GP	G	A	Pts	PIM
2010	Canada Ontario	U17	2nd place, silver medalist(s)	6	3	2	5	12
2010	Canada	IH18	1st place, gold medalist(s)	5	2	2	4	12
2011	Canada	U18	4th	7	0	2	2	22
Junior totals				18	5	6	11	46

Awards and achievements
Preceded by John McFarland	Jack Ferguson Award; 2009	Succeeded by Alex Galchenyuk
