= Stanislav Yegorshev =

Russian ice hockey player

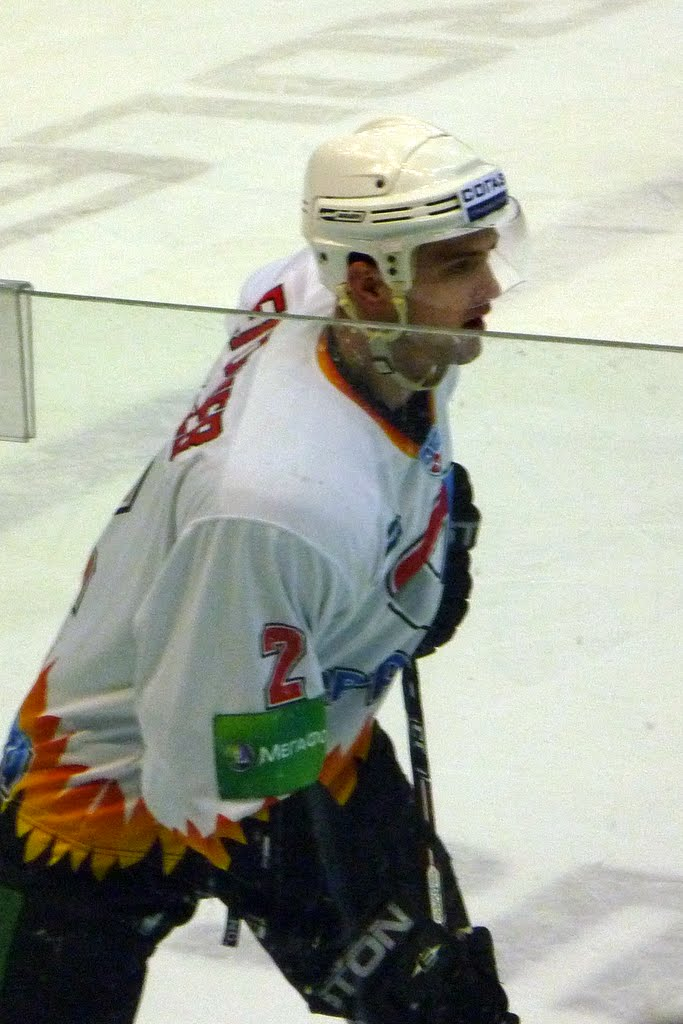
- Born: September 21, 1987 (age 38) Cherepovets, Russian SFSR, Soviet Union
- Height: 6 ft 1 in (185 cm)
- Weight: 192 lb (87 kg; 13 st 10 lb)
- Position: Defence
- Shot: Right
- Played for: Severstal Cherepovets; Avangard Omsk; CSKA Moscow; Torpedo Nizhny Novgorod; Avtomobilist Yekaterinburg
- Playing career: 2006–2019

Stanislav Yegorshev (born September 21, 1987) is a Russian professional ice hockey defenceman who is currently an unrestricted free agent. He most recently played for Avtomobilist Yekaterinburg in the Kontinental Hockey League (KHL). He has previously played the majority of his professional career with fellow Russian club, HC Severstal of the KHL.

== Career statistics ==
			Regular season					Playoffs
Season	Team	League	GP	G	A	Pts	PIM	GP	G	A	Pts	PIM
2003–04	Severstal Cherepovets-2	Russia3	26	1	0	1	6	—	—	—	—	—
2004–05	Severstal Cherepovets-2	Russia3	53	2	3	5	14	—	—	—	—	—
2005–06	Neftyanik Leninogorsk	Russia2	48	0	2	2	44	—	—	—	—	—
2005–06	Toros Neftekamsk	Russia3	1	0	0	0	4	—	—	—	—	—
2006–07	Severstal Cherepovets	Russia	42	0	3	3	28	5	0	1	1	2
2006–07	Severstal Cherepovets-2	Russia3	8	4	5	9	10	—	—	—	—	—
2007–08	Severstal Cherepovets	Russia	21	2	1	3	8	7	0	1	1	4
2007–08	Severstal Cherepovets-2	Russia3	14	2	8	10	22	—	—	—	—	—
2008–09	Severstal Cherepovets	KHL	17	1	2	3	14	—	—	—	—	—
2008–09	Severstal Cherepovets-2	Russia3	6	7	5	12	2	14	5	4	9	16
2009–10	Severstal Cherepovets	KHL	54	6	13	19	22	—	—	—	—	—
2010–11	Severstal Cherepovets	KHL	42	1	8	9	14	4	0	0	0	0
2011–12	Severstal Cherepovets	KHL	42	1	6	7	14	6	1	0	1	4
2012–13	Severstal Cherepovets	KHL	52	4	9	13	48	10	1	1	2	10
2013–14	Avangard Omsk	KHL	22	0	1	1	28	—	—	—	—	—
2013–14	HC CSKA Moscow	KHL	28	2	5	7	6	2	0	0	0	0
2014–15	HC CSKA Moscow	KHL	38	0	5	5	24	14	0	0	0	4
2015–16	Torpedo Nizhny Novgorod	KHL	49	2	3	5	22	11	1	2	3	8
2016–17	Torpedo Nizhny Novgorod	KHL	57	2	6	8	61	5	0	0	0	2
2017–18	Avtomobilist Yekaterinburg	KHL	49	0	9	9	18	4	0	1	1	4
2018–19	Avtomobilist Yekaterinburg	KHL	34	0	2	2	22	2	0	0	0	0
KHL totals			482	19	69	88	293	58	3	4	7	32
Russia totals			63	2	4	6	36	12	0	2	2	6
