= Georgi Misharin =

Russian ice hockey player

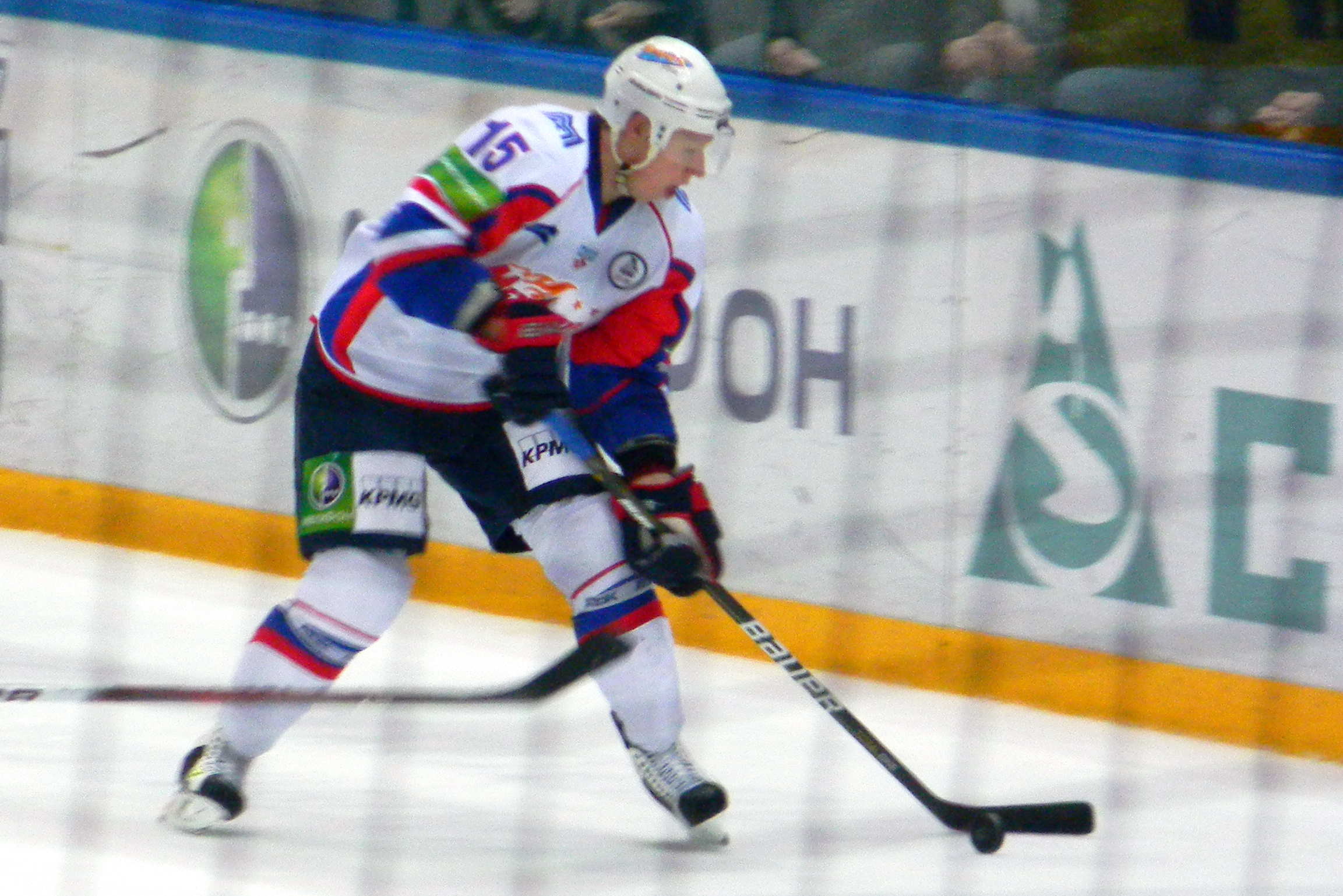
- Born: May 11, 1985 (age 41) Sverdlovsk, Soviet Union
- Height: 6 ft 2 in (188 cm)
- Weight: 216 lb (98 kg; 15 st 6 lb)
- Position: Defence
- Shot: Left
- Played for: Neftekhimik Nizhnekamsk; CSKA Moscow; Dynamo Moscow; Metallurg Magnitogorsk; Sibir Novosibirsk; Avtomobilist Yekaterinburg; Torpedo Nizhny Novgorod
- National team: Russia
- NHL draft: 207th overall, 2003; Minnesota Wild
- Playing career: 2001–2023

Georgi Misharin (born 11 May 1985 in Yekaterinburg, Soviet Union) is a Russian former professional ice hockey defenceman who played in the Kontinental Hockey League (KHL).

== Playing career ==
Misharin played with Dynamo Yekaterinburg in Russia before opting to play a junior season after he was selected by the Saginaw Spirit, 56th overall in the 2003 CHL Import draft. As a result he was drafted by the Minnesota Wild in the seventh round, 207th overall in the 2003 NHL entry draft.

Misharin returned to CSKA Moscow, signing a two-year contract, after two and a half seasons with Metallurg Magnitogorsk on May 13, 2013.

Following a 22-year professional playing career, Misharin announced his retirement at the conclusion of the 2022–23 season with Torpedo Nizhny Novgorod, and immediately assimilated into a coaching career, joining HC Gornyak as an assistant coach on 16 June 2023.

== Career statistics ==
=== Regular season and playoffs ===
| | | | Regular season | | | | | Playoffs |
| Season | Team | League | GP | G | A | Pts | PIM | GP | G | A | Pts | PIM |
|---|---|---|---|---|---|---|---|---|---|---|---|---|
| 2000–01 | Dinamo–Energija–2 Yekaterinburg | RUS.3 | 32 | 1 | 3 | 4 | 14 | — | — | — | — | — |
| 2001–02 | Metallurg–2 Magnitogorsk | RUS.3 | 9 | 0 | 0 | 0 | 8 | — | — | — | — | — |
| 2002–03 | Dinamo–Energija Yekaterinburg | RUS.2 | 28 | 1 | 3 | 4 | 18 | — | — | — | — | — |
| 2002–03 | Dinamo–Energija–2 Yekaterinburg | RUS.3 | 28 | 1 | 5 | 6 | 40 | — | — | — | — | — |
| 2003–04 | Saginaw Spirit | OHL | 65 | 5 | 22 | 27 | 42 | — | — | — | — | — |
| 2004–05 | Neftekhimik Nizhnekamsk | RSL | 47 | 1 | 3 | 4 | 38 | 3 | 0 | 0 | 0 | 4 |
| 2005–06 | CSKA Moscow | RSL | 50 | 4 | 10 | 14 | 46 | 7 | 0 | 0 | 0 | 31 |
| 2006–07 | Dynamo Moscow | RSL | 48 | 3 | 7 | 10 | 70 | 3 | 0 | 1 | 1 | 12 |
| 2007–08 | CSKA Moscow | RSL | 50 | 6 | 5 | 11 | 42 | 6 | 0 | 1 | 1 | 6 |
| 2008–09 | CSKA Moscow | KHL | 54 | 3 | 12 | 15 | 52 | 8 | 0 | 1 | 1 | 6 |
| 2009–10 | CSKA Moscow | KHL | 54 | 4 | 6 | 10 | 52 | 3 | 0 | 0 | 0 | 2 |
| 2010–11 | CSKA Moscow | KHL | 47 | 4 | 5 | 9 | 50 | — | — | — | — | — |
| 2010–11 | Metallurg Magnitogorsk | KHL | 4 | 0 | 0 | 0 | 4 | 20 | 1 | 3 | 4 | 22 |
| 2011–12 | Metallurg Magnitogorsk | KHL | 44 | 1 | 7 | 8 | 42 | 10 | 0 | 0 | 0 | 0 |
| 2012–13 | Metallurg Magnitogorsk | KHL | 49 | 2 | 10 | 12 | 38 | 7 | 0 | 0 | 0 | 4 |
| 2013–14 | CSKA Moscow | KHL | 54 | 3 | 9 | 12 | 26 | 4 | 0 | 0 | 0 | 2 |
| 2014–15 | CSKA Moscow | KHL | 39 | 1 | 11 | 12 | 8 | 9 | 0 | 0 | 0 | 4 |
| 2015–16 | Sibir Novosibirsk | KHL | 34 | 1 | 6 | 7 | 16 | 10 | 0 | 1 | 1 | 0 |
| 2016–17 | Sibir Novosibirsk | KHL | 36 | 2 | 4 | 6 | 10 | — | — | — | — | — |
| 2017–18 | Avtomobilist Yekaterinburg | KHL | 46 | 0 | 4 | 4 | 25 | 4 | 0 | 0 | 0 | 2 |
| 2018–19 | Avtomobilist Yekaterinburg | KHL | 32 | 0 | 2 | 2 | 6 | — | — | — | — | — |
| 2019–20 | Torpedo Nizhny Novgorod | KHL | 54 | 3 | 6 | 9 | 30 | 4 | 0 | 0 | 0 | 0 |
| 2020–21 | Torpedo Nizhny Novgorod | KHL | 47 | 0 | 5 | 5 | 18 | 4 | 0 | 0 | 0 | 2 |
| 2021–22 | Torpedo Nizhny Novgorod | KHL | 23 | 0 | 2 | 2 | 21 | — | — | — | — | — |
| 2022–23 | Torpedo Nizhny Novgorod | KHL | 41 | 0 | 3 | 3 | 12 | 1 | 0 | 0 | 0 | 0 |
| RSL totals | | | 195 | 14 | 24 | 38 | 196 | 19 | 0 | 4 | 4 | 53 |
| KHL totals | | | 650 | 24 | 92 | 116 | 410 | 84 | 1 | 5 | 6 | 46 |

=== International ===
| Year | Team | Event | Result | GP | G | A | Pts | PIM |
|---|---|---|---|---|---|---|---|---|
| 2003 | Russia | WJC18 | 3rd place, bronze medalist(s) | 6 | 0 | 2 | 2 | 2 |
| 2005 | Russia | WJC | 2nd place, silver medalist(s) | 6 | 1 | 1 | 2 | 6 |
| 2006 | Russia | WC | 5th | 3 | 0 | 1 | 1 | 4 |
| Junior totals | | | | 12 | 1 | 3 | 4 | 8 |
| Senior totals | | | | 3 | 0 | 1 | 1 | 4 |
