= Dmitri Ogurtsov =

Russian ice hockey player (born 1994)

- Born: 20 June 1994 (age 30); Moscow, Russia
- Height: 6 ft 7 in (201 cm)
- Weight: 260 lb (118 kg; 18 st 8 lb)
- Position: Defence
- Shoots: Left
- KHL team Former teams: Free Agent; CSKA Moscow; Lada Togliatti; Neftekhimik Nizhnekamsk; Dynamo Moscow; Traktor Chelyabinsk
- Playing career: 2012–present

Dmitri Andreyevich Ogurtsov (Russian: Дмитрий Андреевич Огурцов; born 20 June 1994) is a Russian professional ice hockey defenceman. He is currently an unrestricted free agent who most recently played with Traktor Chelyabinsk of the Kontinental Hockey League (KHL).

Ogurtsov made his Kontinental Hockey League debut playing with HC CSKA Moscow during the 2013–14 KHL season.

On 14 July 2020, Ogurtsov continued his KHL career, signing a one-year contract as a free agent with his fifth club, Traktor Chelyabinsk.
