= Yakov Rylov =

Russian ice hockey player

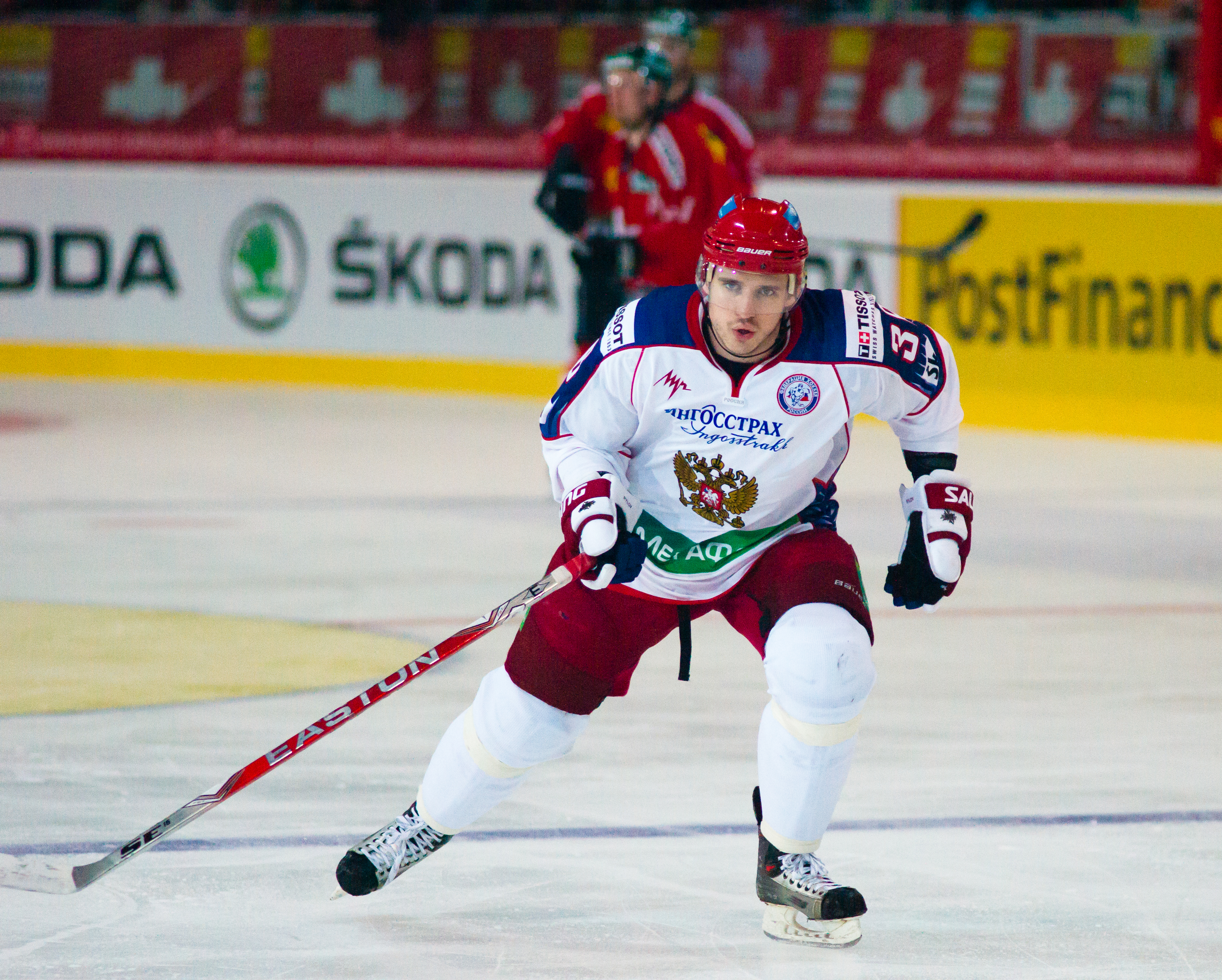
- Born: January 15, 1985 (age 41) Kirovo-Chepetsk, Soviet Union
- Height: 5 ft 10 in (178 cm)
- Weight: 196 lb (89 kg; 14 st 0 lb)
- Position: Defence
- Shot: Left
- Played for: Dynamo Moscow; CSKA Moscow; Neftekhimik Nizhnekamsk; Ak Bars Kazan; Metallurg Magnitogorsk; Spartak Moscow; Avtomobilist Yekaterinburg; Amur Khabarovsk
- Playing career: 2002–2025

Yakov Nikolayevich Rylov (Russian: Яков Николаевич Рылов; born January 15, 1985) is a Russian former professional ice hockey defender who played in the Kontinental Hockey League (KHL).

== Playing career ==
Rylov joined Metallurg Magnitogorsk, after a second stint with original club HC Dynamo Moscow, as a free agent prior to the 2018–19 season, on 15 July 2018. He appeared in every game on the blueline with Metallurg, posting 2 goals and 5 points in 60 appearances.

On 14 June 2019, Rylov opted to sign as a free agent with his 6th KHL club, HC Spartak Moscow, on a one-year contract.

At the conclusion of the 2024–25 regular season, in his third year with Amur Khabarovsk, Rylov announced his retirement from professional hockey following 24 seasons on 22 March 2025.

== Career statistics ==
			Regular season					Playoffs
Season	Team	League	GP	G	A	Pts	PIM	GP	G	A	Pts	PIM
2001–02	Olimpiya Kirovo-Chepetsk-2	Russia3	26	1	4	5	20	—	—	—	—	—
2002–03	Olimpiya Kirovo-Chepetsk	Russia2	16	0	2	2	6	—	—	—	—	—
2002–03	Olimpiya Kirovo-Chepetsk-2	Russia3	53	12	18	30	64	—	—	—	—	—
2003–04	Olimpiya Kirovo-Chepetsk	Russia2	37	2	3	5	14	—	—	—	—	—
2003–04	Olimpiya Kirovo-Chepetsk-2	Russia3	17	8	2	10	24	—	—	—	—	—
2004–05	HC Dynamo Moscow	Russia	51	0	4	4	36	6	0	1	1	10
2004–05	HC Dynamo Moscow-2	Russia3	2	1	0	1	6	—	—	—	—	—
2005–06	HC Dynamo Moscow	Russia	22	1	2	3	28	4	0	0	0	2
2006–07	HC Dynamo Moscow	Russia	50	6	6	12	91	—	—	—	—	—
2007–08	HC Dynamo Moscow	Russia	54	4	5	9	68	8	2	1	3	4
2008–09	HC Dynamo Moscow	KHL	37	2	6	8	26	5	0	0	0	4
2008–09	HC Dynamo Moscow-2	Russia3	1	0	0	0	0	—	—	—	—	—
2009–10	HC CSKA Moscow	KHL	52	2	10	12	42	3	1	1	2	4
2010–11	HC CSKA Moscow	KHL	41	9	19	28	30	—	—	—	—	—
2010–11	HC Neftekhimik Nizhnekamsk	KHL	4	0	1	1	2	7	0	3	3	2
2011–12	HC CSKA Moscow	KHL	29	3	13	16	14	—	—	—	—	—
2012–13	HC CSKA Moscow	KHL	51	10	25	35	19	9	2	0	2	4
2013–14	HC CSKA Moscow	KHL	31	4	6	10	10	2	1	0	1	0
2014–15	Ak Bars Kazan	KHL	53	0	10	10	24	20	0	6	6	8
2015–16	Ak Bars Kazan	KHL	53	3	16	19	42	2	0	0	0	0
2016–17	HC Dynamo Moscow	KHL	54	6	6	12	76	10	2	1	3	6
2017–18	HC Dynamo Moscow	KHL	44	3	7	10	18	—	—	—	—	—
2018–19	Metallurg Magnitogorsk	KHL	60	2	3	5	44	4	0	0	0	25
2019–20	HC Spartak Moscow	KHL	60	7	28	35	34	3	0	1	1	2
2020–21	HC Spartak Moscow	KHL	59	4	17	21	36	4	0	0	0	0
2021–22	HC Spartak Moscow	KHL	6	0	0	0	0	—	—	—	—	—
2021–22	Khimik Voskresensk	VHL	2	0	0	0	2	—	—	—	—	—
2021–22	Avtomobilist Yekaterinburg	KHL	19	2	3	5	14	—	—	—	—	—
2022–23	Amur Khabarovsk	KHL	27	3	1	4	16	—	—	—	—	—
2023–24	Amur Khabarovsk	KHL	43	2	12	14	26	6	0	1	1	0
2024–25	Amur Khabarovsk	KHL	37	2	1	3	14	—	—	—	—	—
Russia totals			177	11	17	28	223	18	2	2	4	16
KHL totals			760	64	184	248	487	75	6	13	19	55

=== International ===
Year	Team	Event	Result	GP	G	A	Pts	PIM
2005	Russia	WJC	2nd place, silver medalist(s)	6	1	1	2	14
Junior totals				6	1	1	2	14

== Honours ==
- Russian championship: 2005
- IIHF European Champions Cup: 2006
