= 2014 Kontinental Hockey League All-Star Game =

2014 KHL All-Star Game
	1	2	3	Total
Team East	5	5	6	16
Team West	6	6	6	18
- Date: 11 January 2013
- Arena: Slovnaft Arena
- City: Bratislava, Slovakia
- Attendance: 10,055

The 2014 Kontinental Hockey League All-Star Game took place on January 11, 2014, at the Slovnaft Arena in Bratislava, Slovakia, home of Slovan Bratislava, during the 2013–14 KHL season. Before the game, the players will compete in various events designed to test their speed, technique and creative skills.

The day before the All-Star Game, on 10 January 2013, several legendary veterans of Russian and Czechoslovak hockey played against each other in a friendly game.

== Rosters ==
=== Fan balloting ===
#	Name	Pos.	Team	Votes
17	Ilya Kovalchuk	LW	SKA Saint Petersburg	18,638
47	Alexander Radulov	RW	CSKA Moscow	15,510
10	Sergei Mozyakin	LW	Metallurg Magnitogorsk	14,964
25	Danis Zaripov	RW	Metallurg Magnitogorsk	12,715
8	Sandis Ozoliņš	D	Dinamo Riga	11,205
2	Deron Quint	D	Spartak Moscow	10,356

=== Final roster ===
On November 29, 2013, was the final day of the fans’ vote to select the starting line-ups for the Eastern and Western Conference teams. The best five's selected as the first lines and goalies. In December 10, accredited journalists selected 2nd lines and goalies. On December 12, 2013, the league selected the coaches for teams East and West. The brigade of bosses in charge of Team West were Oleg Znarok, Jukka Jalonen and Fedor Kanareikin. Mike Keenan, Valery Belov and Dmitri Kvartalnov selected to head the Team East. Following the fans’ vote to select the starting line-ups and the journalists’ ballot to choose the second lines and goalies, the Kontinental Hockey League has added the remaining players to complete the rosters for teams East and West. On December 27, 2013, In response to the wishes of many fans and the sound arguments put forward by professional hockey journalists, the Kontinental Hockey League has agreed to add four attackers to the rosters. Team West's offense will be strengthened by the arrival of Jakub Klepiš of Lev Prague and Geoff Platt of Dinamo Minsk, while Torpedo Nizhny Novgorod’s Denis Parshin and Traktor Chelyabinsk’s Evgeny Kuznetsov have been chosen to reinforce Team East.

Team West
Nat.	Player	Team	Pos.	Num.
(Slovakia)	Jaroslav Janus	Slovan Bratislava	G	32
(Latvia)	Sandis Ozoliņš	Dinamo Riga	D	8
(United States)	Deron Quint	Spartak Moscow	D	2
(Russia)	Ilya Kovalchuk (C)	SKA Saint Petersburg	LW	17
(Russia)	Alexander Radulov	CSKA Moscow	RW	47
(Canada)	Jonathan Cheechoo	Medveščak Zagreb	RW	18
(Russia)	Ivan Lisutin	Vityaz Podolsk	G	48
(Canada)	Kurtis Foster	Medveščak Zagreb	D	55
(Russia)	Maxim Chudinov	SKA Saint Petersburg	D	73
(Russia)	Nikolai Prokhorkin	CSKA Moscow	LW	74
(Russia)	Viktor Tikhonov	SKA Saint Petersburg	RW	10
(Finland)	Leo Komarov	Dynamo Moscow	RW	87
(Russia)	Bogdan Kiselevich	Severstal Cherepovets	D	55
(Russia)	Ilya Gorokhov	Lokomotiv Yaroslavl	D	77
(Russia)	Denis Denisov	CSKA Moscow	D	6
(Slovakia)	Milan Bartovič	Slovan Bratislava	LW	61
(Slovakia)	Miroslav Šatan	Slovan Bratislava	RW	18
(Slovakia)	Marcel Hossa	Dinamo Riga	LW	81
(Russia)	Maxim Afinogenov	Vityaz Podolsk	RW	61
(Belarus)	Geoff Platt	Dinamo Minsk	C	16
(Czech Republic)	Jakub Klepiš	Lev Prague	C	21
Co-Head Coaches: Oleg Znarok, Jukka Jalonen, Fedor Kanareikin				–

Team East
Nat.	Player	Team	Pos.	Num.
(Finland)	Mikko Koskinen	Sibir Novosibirsk	G	19
(Russia)	Kirill Koltsov	Salavat Yulaev Ufa	D	4
(Canada)	Shaun Heshka	Ak Bars Kazan	D	26
(Russia)	Sergei Mozyakin (C)	Metallurg Magnitogorsk	LW	10
(Russia)	Danis Zaripov	Metallurg Magnitogorsk	LW	25
(United States)	Brandon Bochenski	Barys Astana	RW	27
(Russia)	Konstantin Barulin	Ak Bars Kazan	G	30
(Canada)	Chris Lee	Metallurg Magnitogorsk	D	4
(Finland)	Juuso Hietanen	Torpedo Nizhny Novgorod	D	11
(Russia)	Fyodor Malykhin	Avtomobilist Yekaterinburg	C	98
(Russia)	Enver Lisin	Admiral Vladivostok	RW	7
(Finland)	Jori Lehterä	Sibir Novosibirsk	C	12
(Russia)	Evgeny Medvedev	Ak Bars Kazan	D	82
(Russia)	Andrei Zubarev	Salavat Yulaev Ufa	D	3
(Russia)	Denis Kulyash	Avangard Omsk	D	28
(Russia)	Alexander Popov	Avangard Omsk	LW	24
(Russia)	Egor Milovzorov	Neftekhimik Nizhnekamsk	RW	70
(Czech Republic)	Jakub Petružálek	Amur Khabarovsk	C	88
(Kazakhstan)	Talgat Zhailauov	Barys Astana	C	8
(Russia)	Denis Parshin	Torpedo Nizhny Novgorod	LW	16
(Czech Republic)	Jan Kovář	Metallurg Magnitogorsk	LW	43
Co-Head Coaches: Mike Keenan, Dmitri Kvartalnov, Valery Belov				–

Source: Official website.

Withdrawn

Prior to the draft several players withdrew due to injury:

Nat.	Name	Team	Pos.	Reason and replacement
(Russia)	Evgeny Kuznetsov	Traktor Chelyabinsk	RW	Injury, replaced by Jan Kovář
(Russia)	Alexander Eremenko	Dynamo Moscow	G	Injury, replaced by Petri Vehanen
(Finland)	Petri Vehanen	Lev Prague	G	Injury, replaced by Jaroslav Janus

== Game summary ==
January 11, 2014; 19:00	Team West	18 – 16 (6 – 5, 6 – 5, 6 – 6)	Team East	Slovnaft Arena; Attendance: 10,055

Game reference

Ivan Lisutin
Jaroslav Janus
Goalies
Konstantin Barulin
Mikko Koskinen
Referees:
(Latvia) Eduard Odiņš
(Russia) Konstantin Olenin
Linesmen:
(Russia) Viktor Birin
(Russia) Alexander Zakharenkov

M. Chudinov (M. Hossa, I. Gorokhov) – 02:49	1 – 0
J. Cheechoo (I. Kovalchuk, M. Šatan) – 03:18	2 – 0
G. Platt (V. Tikhonov, K. Foster) – 05:53	3 – 0
	3 – 1	07:29 – E. Lisin (F. Malykhin)
	3 – 2	08:31 – T. Zhailauov (A. Popov, B. Bochenski)
S. Ozoliņš (L. Komarov) – 08:46	4 – 2
M. Afinogenov – 10:12	5 – 2
	5 – 3	13:06 – J. Kovář
	5 – 4	14:52 – F. Malykhin (J. Lehterä, E. Lisin)
	5 – 5	17:37 – J. Petružálek (E. Milovzorov)
L. Komarov (V. Tikhonov, D. Quint) – 19:19	6 – 5
	6 – 6	22:56 – J. Lehterä
M. Hossa – 23:45	7 – 6
	7 – 7	25:14 – D. Parshin (K. Koltsov, E. Milovzorov)
	7 – 8	26:32 – E. Milovzorov (J. Petružálek)
D. Denisov (M. Bartovič) – 28:51	8 – 8
M. Hossa (M. Bartovič, M. Afinogenov) – 29:28	9 – 8
I. Kovalchuk (M. Šatan) – 32:13	10 – 8
	10 – 9	33:22 – B. Bochenski (A. Popov, T. Zhailauov)
D. Denisov (L. Komarov) – 33:38	11 – 9
	11 – 10	34:07 – D. Parshin (J. Petružálek)
I. Gorokhov (V. Tikhonov, L. Komarov) – 37:50	12 – 10
N. Prokhorkin (L. Komarov) – 42:06	13 – 10
	13 – 11	43:45 – A. Zubarev (J. Lehterä)
L. Komarov (N. Prokhorkin) – 48:32	14 – 11
V. Tikhonov (M. Chudinov, N. Prokhorkin) – 49:35	15 – 11
M. Bartovič – 51:35	16 – 11
	16 – 12	53:51 – J. Lehterä (F. Malykhin, E. Lisin)
	16 – 13	56:28 – B. Bochenski (K. Koltsov, E. Milovzorov)
	16 – 14	57:26 – C. Lee (E. Milovzorov, J. Petružálek)
G. Platt (J. Cheechoo, I. Kovalchuk) – 58:19	17 – 14
	17 – 15	58:42 – S. Mozyakin
M. Šatan (V. Tikhonov) – 59:37	18 – 15
	18 – 16	59:56 – S. Mozyakin

0 min
Penalties
0 min
43
Shots
50

== See also ==
- 2013–14 KHL season
- Kontinental Hockey League All-Star Game
