= Dmitri Makarov (ice hockey) =

Russian ice hockey player

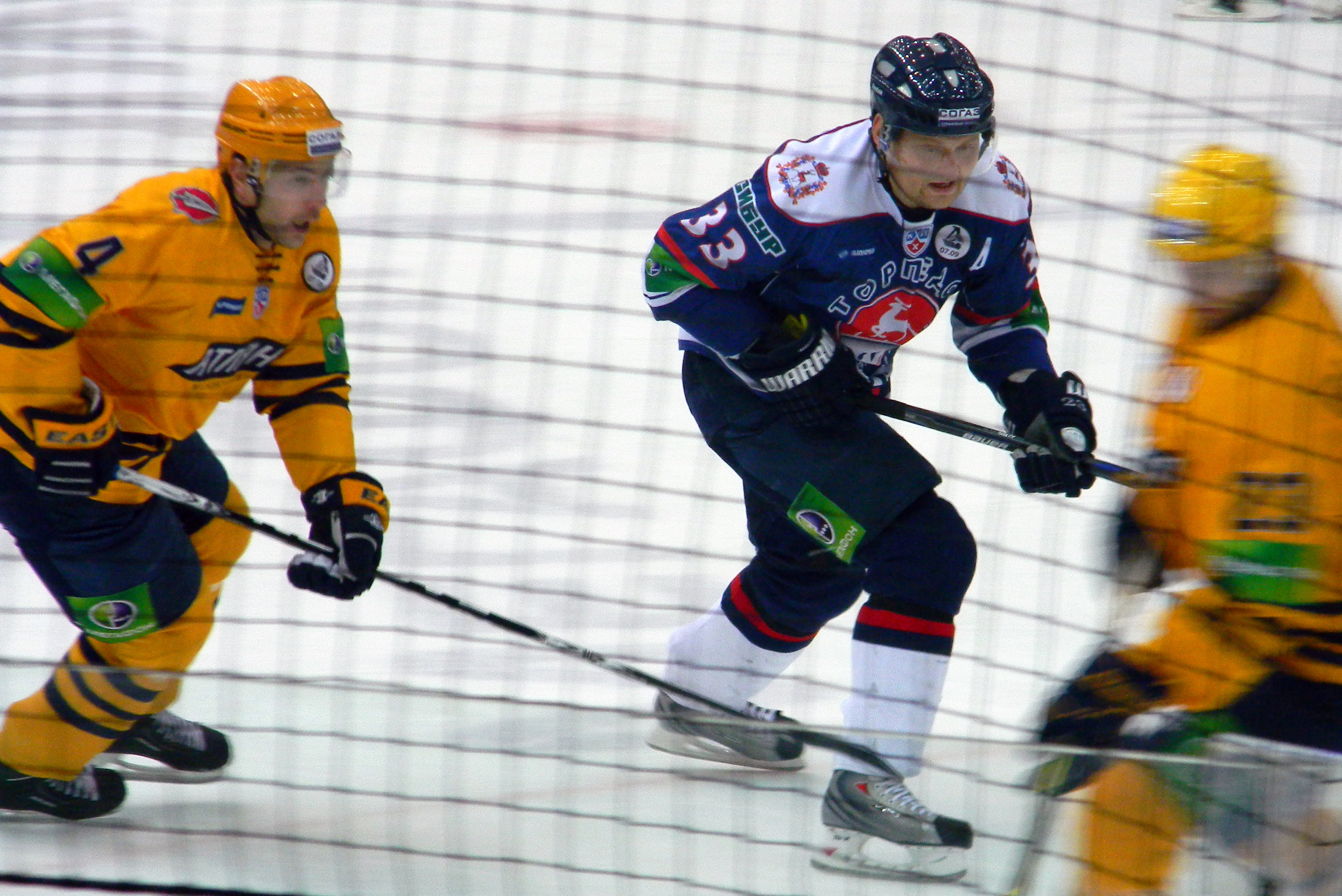
- Born: December 6, 1983 (age 42) Ufa, Russian SFSR, USSR
- Height: 5 ft 10 in (178 cm)
- Weight: 179 lb (81 kg; 12 st 11 lb)
- Position: Right wing
- Shot: Left
- Played for: Metallurg Magnitogorsk; Salavat Yulaev Ufa; Neftekhimik Nizhnekamsk; Torpedo Nizhny Novgorod; HC Yugra
- Playing career: 2002–2018

Dmitri Leonidovich Makarov (born December 6, 1983) is a Russian professional ice hockey winger who is an unrestricted free agent. He most recently played for HC Yugra of the Kontinental Hockey League (KHL).

== Career ==
After his second year with Torpedo Nizhny Novgorod in the 2012–13 season, Makarov was traded in the off-season to return to Salavat Yulaev in exchange for Denis Parshin and Sergei Sentyurin on May 5, 2013.

== Career statistics ==
			Regular season					Playoffs
Season	Team	League	GP	G	A	Pts	PIM	GP	G	A	Pts	PIM
1998–99	Nowoil Ufa	Russia3	9	4	2	6	6	—	—	—	—	—
1999–00	Salavat Yulaev Ufa-2	Russia3	36	22	18	40	60	—	—	—	—	—
2000–01	Salavat Yulaev Ufa	Russia	2	0	0	0	0	—	—	—	—	—
2000–01	Salavat Yulaev Ufa-2	Russia3	44	21	18	39	76	—	—	—	—	—
2001–02	Metallurg Magnitogorsk-2	Russia3	34	20	19	39	26	—	—	—	—	—
2002–03	Metallurg Magnitogorsk	Russia	4	0	0	0	2	—	—	—	—	—
2002–03	Metallurg Magnitogorsk-2	Russia3	48	24	38	62	108	—	—	—	—	—
2003–04	Zauralie Kurgan	Russia2	30	12	9	21	44	—	—	—	—	—
2003–04	Metallurg Magnitogorsk	Russia	4	0	0	0	2	—	—	—	—	—
2003–04	Metallurg Magnitogorsk-2	Russia3	29	13	22	35	38	—	—	—	—	—
2004–05	Metallurg Magnitogorsk	Russia	24	3	3	6	14	—	—	—	—	—
2004–05	Metallurg Magnitogorsk-2	Russia3	21	19	25	44	22	—	—	—	—	—
2004–05	Salavat Yulaev Ufa	Russia	11	4	3	7	8	—	—	—	—	—
2005–06	Salavat Yulaev Ufa	Russia	43	15	13	28	96	6	2	2	4	10
2005–06	Salavat Yulaev Ufa-2	Russia3	2	4	3	7	2	—	—	—	—	—
2006–07	Salavat Yulaev Ufa	Russia	14	1	0	1	14	—	—	—	—	—
2006–07	Salavat Yulaev Ufa-2	Russia3	14	7	13	20	38	—	—	—	—	—
2007–08	HC Neftekhimik Nizhnekamsk	Russia	56	15	20	35	159	5	0	3	3	2
2008–09	HC Neftekhimik Nizhnekamsk	KHL	47	9	18	27	24	3	1	0	1	8
2009–10	HC Neftekhimik Nizhnekamsk	KHL	34	5	3	8	57	9	1	3	4	4
2010–11	HC Neftekhimik Nizhnekamsk	KHL	52	14	19	33	34	1	0	0	0	0
2011–12	Torpedo Nizhny Novgorod	KHL	41	14	16	30	46	12	4	6	10	4
2012–13	Torpedo Nizhny Novgorod	KHL	52	13	30	43	14	—	—	—	—	—
2013–14	Salavat Yulaev Ufa	KHL	54	11	29	40	20	18	3	7	10	6
2014–15	Salavat Yulaev Ufa	KHL	55	11	24	35	34	4	0	4	4	0
2015–16	Salavat Yulaev Ufa	KHL	48	12	14	26	20	19	1	4	5	35
2016–17	HC Neftekhimik Nizhnekamsk	KHL	23	1	7	8	4	—	—	—	—	—
2016–17	Salavat Yulaev Ufa	KHL	27	3	3	6	12	2	0	0	0	0
2017–18	Yugra Khanty-Mansiysk	KHL	19	0	4	4	18	—	—	—	—	—
KHL totals			452	93	167	260	283	68	10	24	34	57
Russia totals			158	38	39	77	295	11	2	5	7	12
