= Denis Parshin =

Russian ice hockey player (born 1986)

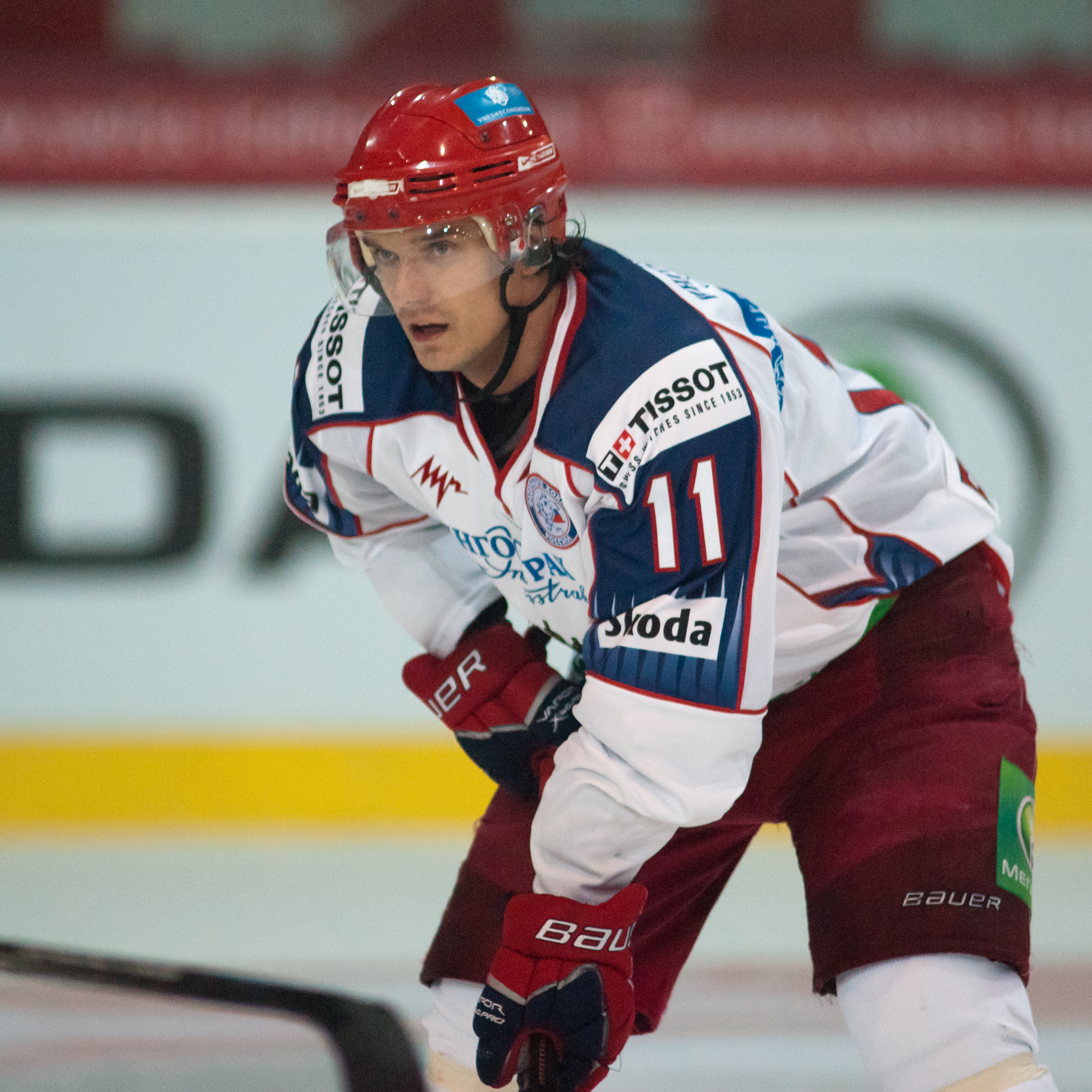
- Born: 1 February 1986 (age 40) Rybinsk, Russian SFSR, Soviet Union
- Height: 5 ft 10 in (178 cm)
- Weight: 165 lb (75 kg; 11 st 11 lb)
- Position: Left wing
- Shoots: Left
- BXL team Former teams: Metallurg Zhlobin; CSKA Moscow; Salavat Yulaev Ufa; Torpedo Nizhny Novgorod; Avangard Omsk; Metallurg Magnitogorsk; HC Košice; Dinamo Riga; Neftekhimik Nizhnekamsk; HC 19 Humenné
- NHL draft: 72nd overall, 2004; Colorado Avalanche
- Playing career: 2003–present

Denis Parshin (Russian: Денис Паршин, born 1 February 1986 in Rybinsk, USSR) is a Russian professional ice hockey left wing who is currently playing for Metallurg Zhlobin of the Belarusian Extraleague (BXL).

== Playing career ==
During the past several seasons Denis Parshin has been playing for HC CSKA Moscow in the KHL. Internationally, he was a member of the U18 and then U20 Russian National team. The young forward has also been a member of Russia's senior national team during EuroTour competition that largely takes place between the four European hockey nations (Russia, Sweden, Finland, and Czech Republic). Parshin was drafted by the Colorado Avalanche in the third round 72nd overall in the 2004 NHL entry draft.

On June 1, 2011, Parshin signed a three-year contract extension to remain with CSKA. During his tenth season with CSKA in 2012–13, after scoring 2 points in 9 games, Parshin was traded to fellow KHL club Salavat Yulaev Ufa in exchange for Igor Grigorenko on October 10, 2012. Parshin continued to struggle offensively with Salavat to post 5 goals in 29 games before ending the season on the injured list.

In the off-season, Parshin tenure with Salavat was ended when he was traded, along with Sergei Sentyurin, to Torpedo Nizhny Novgorod in exchange for Dmitri Makarov on May 5, 2013.

In May 2014, Parshin signed a three-year deal to play for Siberian side Avangard Omsk, where he became the clubs topscorer in his first season with a personal record of 25 goals and 56 points.

In the final year of his contract with Omsk, Parshin began the 2016–17 season, amongst the club's top two-scoring lines. In 28 games, he contributed with 5 goals and 12 points before he was traded in return to Salavat Yulaev Ufa on November 24, 2016.

On the opening day of free agency in the following summer, Parshin returned to another former club, agreeing to a one-year deal with Torpedo Nizhny Novgorod on May 1, 2017. In remaining with Torpedo through the 2018–19 season, Parshin posted his highest offensive totals since 2015, collecting 16 goals and 41 points through 61 games.

Having left Torpedo for a second time as a free agent, Parshin agreed to a two-year contract with Metallurg Magnitogorsk on May 1, 2019. In the ensuing 2019–20 season, Parshin notched 10 goals in 49 games with Metallurg before he left nearing completion of the regular season to join his first club outside Russia with HC Košice of the Slovak Extraliga on February 16, 2020. Parshin registered 4 points in 9 games with Košice before the remainder of the season was cancelled due to the COVID-19 pandemic.

As a free agent, Parshin opted to extend his career in returning to the KHL and agreeing to a one-year contract with Latvian-based, Dinamo Riga, on 3 August 2020.

== Career statistics ==
=== Regular season and playoffs ===
			Regular season					Playoffs
Season	Team	League	GP	G	A	Pts	PIM	GP	G	A	Pts	PIM
2001–02	Lokomotiv–2 Yaroslavl	RUS.3	1	0	0	0	0	—	—	—	—	—
2002–03	CSKA–2 Moscow	RUS.3	13	4	5	9	6	—	—	—	—	—
2003–04	CSKA Moscow	RSL	27	2	4	6	4	—	—	—	—	—
2003–04	CSKA–2 Moscow	RUS.3	28	12	16	28	28	—	—	—	—	—
2004–05	CSKA Moscow	RSL	42	3	4	7	18	—	—	—	—	—
2004–05	CSKA–2 Moscow	RUS.3	5	0	2	2	4	—	—	—	—	—
2005–06	CSKA Moscow	RSL	37	2	8	10	22	6	0	2	2	2
2005–06	CSKA–2 Moscow	RUS.3	2	2	1	3	0	—	—	—	—	—
2006–07	CSKA Moscow	RSL	54	18	14	32	24	12	2	2	4	8
2006–07	CSKA–2 Moscow	RUS.3	1	0	1	1	0	—	—	—	—	—
2007–08	CSKA Moscow	RSL	56	12	23	35	46	6	1	0	1	0
2008–09	CSKA Moscow	KHL	48	12	14	26	34	8	1	0	1	6
2009–10	CSKA Moscow	KHL	56	21	22	43	28	3	0	1	1	6
2010–11	CSKA Moscow	KHL	48	16	17	33	32	—	—	—	—	—
2011–12	CSKA Moscow	KHL	32	12	12	24	24	5	1	1	2	6
2012–13	CSKA Moscow	KHL	9	1	1	2	2	—	—	—	—	—
2012–13	Salavat Yulaev Ufa	KHL	29	5	7	12	20	—	—	—	—	—
2013–14	Torpedo Nizhny Novgorod	KHL	46	15	18	33	36	7	1	3	4	0
2014–15	Avangard Omsk	KHL	60	25	31	56	40	3	0	1	1	0
2015–16	Avangard Omsk	KHL	57	10	21	31	18	8	2	2	4	8
2016–17	Avangard Omsk	KHL	28	5	7	12	10	—	—	—	—	—
2016–17	Salavat Yulaev Ufa	KHL	25	3	5	8	10	5	0	2	2	0
2017–18	Torpedo Nizhny Novgorod	KHL	56	11	15	26	32	3	1	0	1	0
2018–19	Torpedo Nizhny Novgorod	KHL	62	16	25	41	54	7	2	2	4	0
2019–20	Metallurg Magnitogorsk	KHL	49	10	5	15	51	—	—	—	—	—
2019–20	HC Košice	Slovak	9	3	1	4	2	—	—	—	—	—
2020–21	Dinamo Rīga	KHL	44	12	10	22	39	—	—	—	—	—
2021–22	HC Košice	Slovak	39	9	34	43	6	13	2	5	7	0
2022–23	Neftekhimik Nizhnekamsk	KHL	8	0	1	1	2	—	—	—	—	—
2022–23	HC Yugra	VHL	6	1	2	3	2	—	—	—	—	—
2022–23	HC Košice	Slovak	34	12	16	28	18	9	1	0	1	2
2023–24	HC 19 Humenné	Slovak	19	3	6	9	10	—	—	—	—	—
RSL totals			216	37	53	90	114	24	3	4	7	10
KHL totals			658	174	211	385	432	49	8	12	20	26

Medal record

Representing Russia

Ice hockey

World Junior Championships
Silver medal – second place	2005 United States	

IIHF U18 Championships
Gold medal – first place	2004 Belarus	

=== International ===
Year	Team	Event	Result	GP	G	A	Pts	PIM
2003	Russia	U18	2nd place, silver medalist(s)	5	3	3	6	4
2004	Russia	WJC18	1st place, gold medalist(s)	6	0	3	3	0
2005	Russia	WJC	2nd place, silver medalist(s)	6	0	2	2	8
Junior totals				17	3	8	11	12

== Awards and honors ==
Award	Year
Slovak
Champion	2023
