= Andrei Zubarev =

Russian ice hockey player (born 1987)

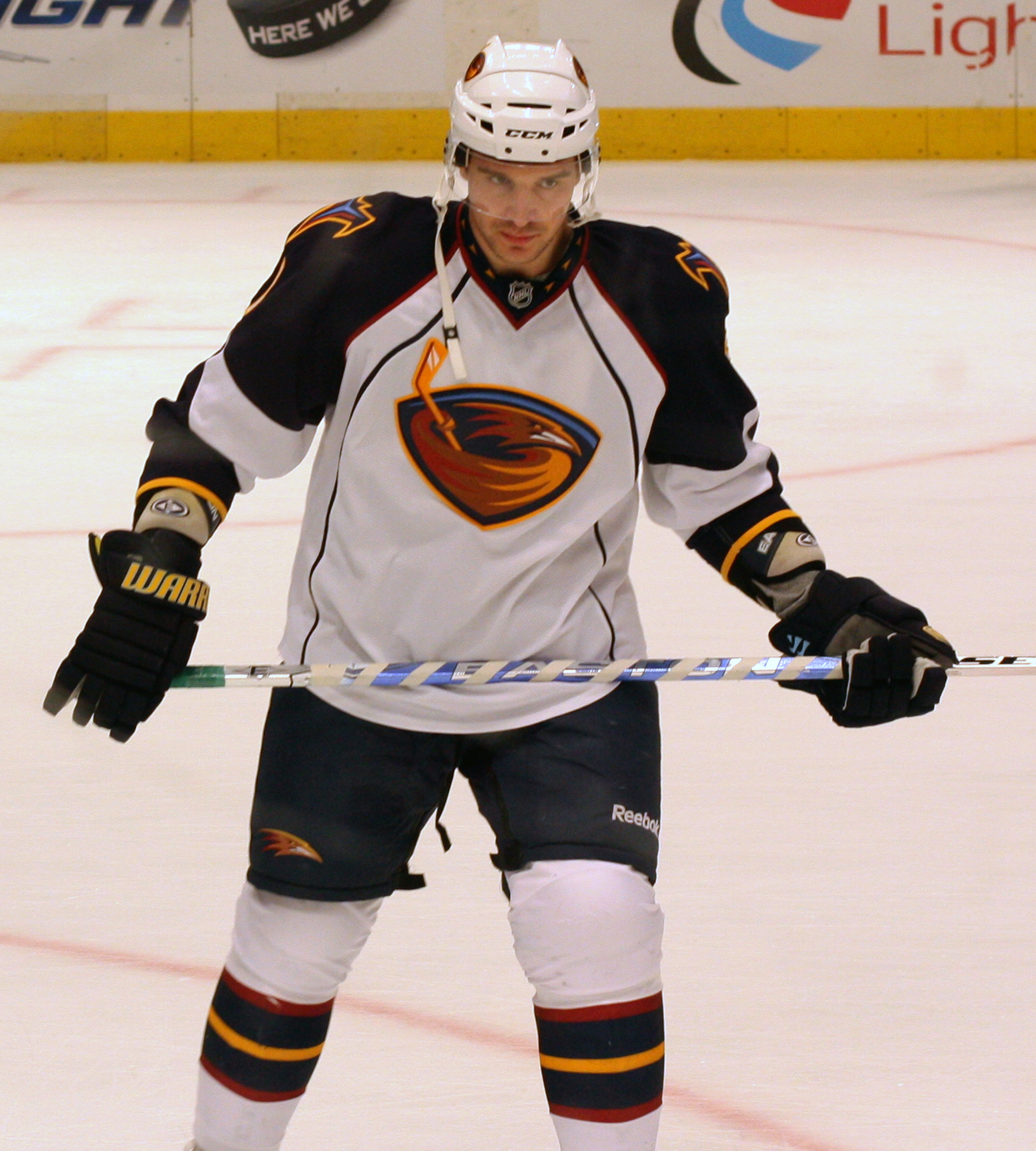
- Zubarev in April 2011
- Born: March 3, 1987 (age 39) Ufa, Soviet Union
- Height: 6 ft 1 in (185 cm)
- Weight: 223 lb (101 kg; 15 st 13 lb)
- Position: Defence
- Shoots: Left
- KHL team Former teams: Free Agent; Salavat Yulaev Ufa; Ak Bars Kazan; Atlant Moscow Oblast; Atlanta Thrashers; SKA Saint Petersburg; Spartak Moscow
- National team: Russia
- NHL draft: 187th overall, 2005; Atlanta Thrashers
- Playing career: 2003–present

Andrey Sergeevich Zubarev (Russian: Андрей Сергеевич Зубарев) (born March 3, 1987) is a Russian professional ice hockey player currently an unrestricted free agent. He most recently played for Salavat Yulaev Ufa of the Kontinental Hockey League (KHL). He previously played in 4 games in the National Hockey League (NHL) with the Atlanta Thrashers during the 2010–11 season.

== Playing career ==
Zubarev was drafted 187th overall in the 2005 NHL entry draft by the Atlanta Thrashers. Unsigned from the Thrashers, Zubarev played in the Russian Super League with Ak Bars Kazan and Salavat Yulaev Ufa. He joined Atlant Moscow Oblast for the inaugural season of the KHL.

On August 24, 2010, he signed a two-year, $625,000 contract with the Atlanta Thrashers. He then returned to the KHL.

After playing five seasons for powerhouse club, SKA Saint Petersburg, Zubarev left as a free agent to continue his career on a two-year contract with Spartak Moscow on 29 May 2020.

== International play ==
Medal record

Ice hockey

Representing Olympic Athletes from Russia

Olympic Games
Gold medal – first place	2018 Pyeongchang	

Representing Russia

World Championships
Gold medal – first place	2014 Minsk	

World Junior Championships
Silver medal – second place	2006 Canada	
Silver medal – second place	2007 Sweden	

Zubarev has played for Russia in the World Junior Championships and the World Championships. For winning the 2014 IIHF World Championship, Andrei Zubarev was awarded the Order of Honour on May 27, 2014. He was a member of the Olympic Athletes from Russia team at the 2018 Winter Olympics and won the gold medal in ice hockey.

== Career statistics ==
=== Regular season and playoffs ===
			Regular season					Playoffs
Season	Team	League	GP	G	A	Pts	PIM	GP	G	A	Pts	PIM
2002–03	Salavat Yulaev–2 Ufa	RUS.3	13	0	2	2	8	—	—	—	—	—
2003–04	Salavat Yulaev Ufa	RSL	6	0	1	1	4	—	—	—	—	—
2003–04	Salavat Yulaev–2 Ufa	RUS.3	34	2	4	6	26	—	—	—	—	—
2004–05	Salavat Yulaev Ufa	RSL	5	0	0	0	4	—	—	—	—	—
2004–05	Salavat Yulaev–2 Ufa	RUS.3	35	2	5	7	48	—	—	—	—	—
2005–06	Ak Bars Kazan	RSL	40	2	10	12	38	—	—	—	—	—
2006–07	Ak Bars Kazan	RSL	20	0	0	0	32	—	—	—	—	—
2007–08	Ak Bars Kazan	RSL	39	4	3	7	86	2	0	0	0	0
2008–09	Atlant Moscow Oblast	KHL	35	0	4	4	65	7	2	3	5	29
2009–10	Atlant Moscow Oblast	KHL	55	7	9	16	58	4	0	0	0	2
2010–11	Chicago Wolves	AHL	51	3	10	13	28	—	—	—	—	—
2010–11	Atlanta Thrashers	NHL	4	0	1	1	4	—	—	—	—	—
2011–12	Atlant Moscow Oblast	KHL	38	6	4	10	20	10	0	3	3	16
2012–13	Salavat Yulaev Ufa	KHL	46	4	14	18	24	14	1	1	2	10
2013–14	Salavat Yulaev Ufa	KHL	53	1	13	14	24	18	2	3	5	8
2014–15	Salavat Yulaev Ufa	KHL	51	3	13	16	18	5	0	1	1	0
2015–16	SKA Saint Petersburg	KHL	40	0	4	4	4	14	0	0	0	4
2016–17	SKA Saint Petersburg	KHL	43	0	6	6	19	18	2	2	4	2
2017–18	SKA Saint Petersburg	KHL	27	0	6	6	33	10	0	2	2	7
2018–19	SKA Saint Petersburg	KHL	27	1	3	4	7	4	0	0	0	0
2019–20	SKA Saint Petersburg	KHL	32	0	2	2	8	—	—	—	—	—
2020–21	Spartak Moscow	KHL	58	2	4	6	14	4	0	0	0	0
2021–22	Salavat Yulaev Ufa	KHL	43	3	0	3	8	10	0	0	0	2
RSL totals			110	6	14	20	164	2	0	0	0	0
KHL totals			548	27	82	109	302	118	7	15	22	80
NHL totals			4	0	1	1	4	—	—	—	—	—

=== International ===
Year	Team	Event	Result	GP	G	A	Pts	PIM
2004	Russia	U18	5th	5	0	0	0	2
2005	Russia	WJC18	5th	6	1	1	2	4
2006	Russia	WJC	2nd place, silver medalist(s)	6	0	2	2	4
2007	Russia	WJC	2nd place, silver medalist(s)	6	0	2	2	2
2014	Russia	WC	1st place, gold medalist(s)	6	0	0	0	0
2018	OAR	OG	1st place, gold medalist(s)	6	0	1	1	0
Junior totals				23	1	5	6	12
Senior totals				12	0	1	1	0

== Awards and honors ==
Award	Year
KHL
All-Star Game	2014
Gagarin Cup	2017
