= CHL Canada/Russia Series =

Annual junior ice hockey tournament (2003–2019)

CHL Canada–Russia Series

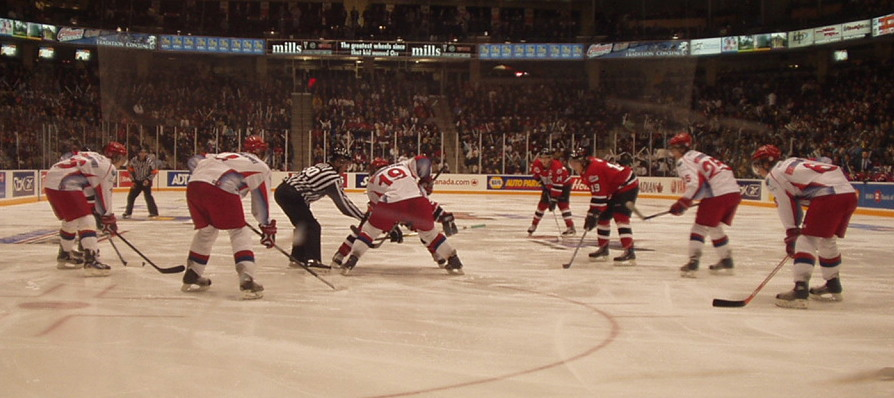
- Team OHL vs. Russian Selects; November 27, 2006 in Oshawa
- Date: Annually in November
- Country: Canada
- Inaugurated: 2003
- Most recent: 2019
- Major events: Ice hockey
- Organiser: Canadian Hockey League
- Sponsors: CIBC (2016–2019); Subway (2009–2014); ADT (2004–2008); RE/MAX (2003)
- Website: chlcanadarussia.ca

The CHL Canada–Russia Series was an annual junior ice hockey exhibition tournament, held between a select team of Russian players and all-star teams representing the Quebec Major Junior Hockey League, the Ontario Hockey League, and the Western Hockey League. Organized by the Canadian Hockey League, the event included six games by the Russian Selects playing two games versus each league's all-star team. Games were broadcast nationally in Canada on Sportsnet. The series often featured players from the Canadian national junior team, and the Russian national junior team.

The first series held in 2003 as the RE/MAX Canada–Russia Challenge, and was envisioned as tune-up for the World Junior Ice Hockey Championships. The event has had several corporate sponsors and names including, the ADT Canada–Russia Challenge from 2004 until 2008, and the Subway Super Series from 2009 until 2014. The 2015 series did not have a title sponsor. In 2016, CIBC picked up the naming rights for five years and renamed the event CIBC Canada–Russia Series. In response to the 2022 Russian invasion of Ukraine, the event was cancelled as of 2022.

== 2003 RE/MAX Canada–Russia Challenge ==
Initial event logo in 2003.

The annual series began in 2003. It was known as the RE/MAX Canada–Russia Challenge after its sponsor RE/MAX, a real estate agency. The CHL won five of the six games. Alexandre Picard led the event with 6 points. Ryan Getzlaf and Dion Phaneuf both scored two goals and two assists for the WHL. Ben Eager led the OHL with two goals. The top scoring Russian was Alexander Shinin with 4 points.

Date	Location	CHL team	Russia	Report
November 17	London, Ontario	OHL 7	1 Russia	
November 19	Sarnia, Ontario	OHL 4	0 Russia	
November 20	Halifax, Nova Scotia	QMJHL 2	3 Russia	
November 24	Rimouski, Quebec	QMJHL 6	3 Russia	
November 26	Calgary, Alberta	WHL 4	1 Russia	
November 27	Brandon, Manitoba	WHL 7	1 Russia	
CHL wins series 5–1 (30–9 CHL)

== 2004 ADT Canada–Russia Challenge ==
Event logo from 2004–2008.

The ADT Corporation became the corporate title sponsor of the series. Russia defeated the QMJHL in both games by 4–3 shootout wins. Russia lost the next four games to the OHL and WHL, losing the series four games to two. Mikhail Yunkov led Russia with 6 points. Eric Fehr scored 3 goals for the WHL, and Dave Bolland scored twice for the OHL.

Date	Location	CHL team	Russia	Report
November 21	Quebec City, Quebec	QMJHL 3	4 Russia	SO (2–0)
November 22	Montreal, Quebec	QMJHL 3	4 Russia	SO (3–0)
November 25	Barrie, Ontario	OHL 3	1 Russia	
November 28	Mississauga, Ontario	OHL 5	2 Russia	
December 1	Red Deer, Alberta	WHL 6	0 Russia	
December 2	Lethbridge, Alberta	WHL 5	2 Russia	
CHL wins series 4–2 (25–13 CHL)

== 2005 ADT Canada–Russia Challenge ==
The third series saw the CHL win all six games by at least two-goal margins. Guillaume Latendresse of the QMJHL led the event with 5 goals. Wojtek Wolski scored 4 times for the OHL. Kyle Chipchura led the WHL with 4 points. Sergei Ogorodnikov scored 3 goals and 3 assists for Russia, while Alexander Mayer scored 4 goals.

Date	Location	CHL team	Russia	Report
November 21	Drummondville, Quebec	QMJHL 7	4 Russia	
November 22	Moncton, New Brunswick	QMJHL 6	4 Russia	
November 24	Kitchener, Ontario	OHL 5	2 Russia	
November 28	Peterborough, Ontario	OHL 5	1 Russia	
November 30	Saskatoon, Saskatchewan	WHL 9	2 Russia	
December 1	Regina, Saskatchewan	WHL 3	1 Russia	
CHL wins series 6–0 (35–14 CHL)

== 2006 ADT Canada–Russia Challenge ==
The CHL won all six games, outscoring Russia by 20 goals, and swept the series for the second year in a row. Brodie Dupont and Zach Boychuk led the CHL with 4 points. Egor Milovzorov led Russia with 6 points, while Vadim Shipachyov led with 4 goals.

Date	Location	CHL team	Russia	Report
November 20	Rouyn-Noranda, Quebec	QMJHL 6	2 Russia	
November 21	Val-d'Or, Quebec	QMJHL 4	3 Russia	
November 23	Sarnia, Ontario	OHL 5	0 Russia	
November 27	Oshawa, Ontario	OHL 4	3 Russia	
November 29	Chilliwack, British Columbia	WHL 5	3 Russia	
November 30	Kamloops, British Columbia	WHL 8	1 Russia	
CHL wins 6–0 (32–12 CHL)

== 2007 ADT Canada–Russia Challenge ==
The 2007 series was much closer than the previous two. Russia won the first game 6–4, ending a 16-game losing streak at the event. Goal scoring was much closer, as the goals totalled 21–19 in favour of the CHL. The CHL won three games in regulation, and the fourth win came in a shootout. John Tavares led the CHL with 4 points. Mikhail Milekhin scored 4 times for Russia, while Anton Korolev led the team with 6 points.

Date	Location	CHL team	Russia	Report
November 19	Chicoutimi, Quebec	QMJHL 4	6 Russia	
November 21	Gatineau, Quebec	QMJHL 3	2 Russia	SO (2–0)
November 22	Kitchener, Ontario	OHL 5	3 Russia	
November 26	Sudbury, Ontario	OHL 4	2 Russia	
November 28	Cranbrook, British Columbia	WHL 1	5 Russia	
November 29	Medicine Hat, Alberta	WHL 4	1 Russia	
CHL wins 4–2 (21–19 CHL)

== 2008 ADT Canada–Russia Challenge ==
The CHL teams won five out of six games, scoring 24 goals and conceding 13. Eight different players led the event with 4 points: Cody Hodgson, John Tavares, Jordan Eberle and Thomas Hickey for the CHL; and Pavel Chernov, Nikita Klyukin, Evgenii Dadonov and Anatoli Nikontsev for Russia.

Date	Location	CHL team	Russia	Report
November 17	Sydney, Nova Scotia	QMJHL 5	3 Russia	
November 19	Saint John, New Brunswick	QMJHL 3	4 Russia	
November 20	Guelph, Ontario	OHL 6	3 Russia	
November 24	St. Catharines, Ontario	OHL 3	2 Russia	
November 26	Swift Current, Saskatchewan	WHL 5	0 Russia	
November 27	Prince Albert, Saskatchewan	WHL 2	1 Russia	
CHL wins series 5–1 (24–13 CHL)

== 2009 Subway Super Series ==
Event logo from 2009–2014.

Subway, a restaurant chain, became the corporate title sponsor. The CHL teams won all six games, scoring 27 goals and conceding 11. Luke Adam led the CHL with 5 points. Kirill Petrov led Russia with 5 points, while Maxim Kitsyn scored 4 goals.

Date	Location	CHL team	Russia	Report
November 16	Drummondville, Quebec	QMJHL 3	1 Russia	
November 18	Shawinigan, Quebec	QMJHL 8	3 Russia	
November 19	Barrie, Ontario	OHL 5	2 Russia	
November 23	Windsor, Ontario	OHL 5	2 Russia	
November 25	Victoria, British Columbia	WHL 2	1 Russia	
November 26	Kelowna, British Columbia	WHL 4	2 Russia	
CHL wins series 6–0 (27–11 CHL)

== 2010 Subway Super Series ==
Russia won both games against the QMJHL and both against the WHL, and won the series for the first time. The OHL won both games to remain unbeaten since 2003. Leading scorers for Russia were Maxim Kitsyn with four goals and two assists and Nikita Dvurechensky with two goals and four assists.

Date	Location	CHL team	Russia	Report
November 8, 2010	Saint John, New Brunswick	QMJHL 4	5 Russia	
November 10, 2010	Drummondville, Quebec	QMJHL 3	4 Russia	
November 11, 2010	London, Ontario	OHL 4	0 Russia	
November 15, 2010	Sudbury, Ontario	OHL 2	1 Russia	SO (3–1)
November 17, 2010	Kamloops, British Columbia	WHL 6	7 Russia	SO (3–1)
November 18, 2010	Prince George, British Columbia	WHL 2	5 Russia	
Russia wins series 4–2 (22–21 Russia)

== 2011 Subway Super Series ==
The CHL teams won the series with three regulation wins, compared to two regulation wins and a shootout win for Russia. The OHL remained unbeaten since the series began in 2003. Ryan Spooner led CHL scorers with 6 points, followed by Jordan Weal with 4 points. Nikita Kucherov and Nikita Gusev led Russia with seven points each, followed by Daniil Apalkov with 6 points.

Date	Location	CHL team	Russia	Report
November 7, 2011	Victoriaville, Quebec	QMJHL 0	2 Russia	
November 9, 2011	Quebec City, Quebec	QMJHL 4	5 Russia	SO (2:1)
November 10, 2011	Ottawa, Ontario	OHL 10	7 Russia	
November 14, 2011	Sault Ste. Marie, Ontario	OHL 6	3 Russia	
November 16, 2011	Regina, Saskatchewan	WHL 5	2 Russia	
November 17, 2011	Moose Jaw, Saskatchewan	WHL 5	7 Russia	
CHL wins 10 points to 8 (30-26 CHL)

== 2012 Subway Super Series ==
Russia won the 2012 series with three regulation wins, and a point from a shootout loss. Russia also won its first game against the OHL in the history of the series. Jonathan Huberdeau led all players with 5 points. Only 29 goals were scored in the series, with no player getting more than two.

Date	Location	CHL team	Russia	Report
November 5, 2012	Boisbriand, Quebec	QMJHL 2	6 Russia	
November 7, 2012	Val-d'Or, Quebec	QMJHL 5	2 Russia	
November 8, 2012	Guelph, Ontario	OHL 1	2 Russia	
November 12, 2012	Sarnia, Ontario	OHL 2	1 Russia	
November 14, 2012	Vancouver, British Columbia	WHL 1	0 Russia	SO (3:0)
November 15, 2012	Victoria, British Columbia	WHL 2	5 Russia	
Russia wins 10 points to 8 (16-13 RUS)

== 2013 Subway Super Series ==
The CHL won the series with three regulation wins, and an overtime loss, compared to two wins and an overtime win for Russia. Igor Rudenkov led Russia with three goals and five points. Charles Hudon and Jonathan Drouin were the top scoring Canadians, with four points each.

Date	Location	CHL team	Russia	Report
November 18, 2013	Gatineau, Quebec	QMJHL 3	2 Russia	
November 20, 2013	Sherbrooke, Quebec	QMJHL 4	3 Russia	
November 21, 2013	Oshawa, Ontario	OHL 2	5 Russia	
November 25, 2013	Sudbury, Ontario	OHL 2	3 Russia	SO (2:1)
November 27, 2013	Red Deer, Alberta	WHL 2	3 Russia	
November 28, 2013	Lethbridge, Alberta	WHL 4	2 Russia	
CHL wins 10 points to 8 (18-17 RUS)

== 2014 Subway Super Series ==
Russia won the series with three regulation wins and a shootout win, despite only scoring 15 goals in the series. Ivan Fischenko was the only player to score four points in the series.

Date	Location	CHL team	Russia	Report
November 10, 2014	Saskatoon, Saskatchewan	WHL 2	3 Russia	SO (4:3)
November 11, 2014	Brandon, Manitoba	WHL 2	3 Russia	
November 13, 2014	Peterborough, Ontario	OHL 0	4 Russia	
November 17, 2014	Kingston, Ontario	OHL 5	1 Russia	
November 18, 2014	Bathurst, New Brunswick	QMJHL 3	1 Russia	
November 20, 2014	Rimouski, Quebec	QMJHL 2	3 Russia	
Russia wins 11 points to 7 (15-14 RUS)

== 2015 Canada/Russia Series ==
The 2015 Canada/Russia Series was played without a corporate title sponsor. CHL teams won five of the six games played, outscoring Russia 24 to 13. Artur Lauta and Spencer Watson led the event with three goals each. Collin Shirley was the top scorer with five points.

Date	Location	CHL team	Russia	Report
November 9, 2015	Kelowna, British Columbia	WHL 7	3 Russia	
November 10, 2015	Kamloops, British Columbia	WHL 4	2 Russia	
November 12, 2015	Owen Sound, Ontario	OHL 3	0 Russia	
November 16, 2015	Windsor, Ontario	OHL 2	1 Russia	
November 17, 2015	Rouyn-Noranda, Quebec	QMJHL 2	3 Russia	
November 19, 2015	Halifax, Nova Scotia	QMJHL 6	4 Russia	
CHL wins 15 points to 3 (24-13 CHL)

== 2016 CIBC Canada/Russia Series ==
Event logo since 2016.

Canadian Imperial Bank of Commerce became the corporate title sponsor of the CHL Canada/Russia series. CHL teams won the series with 3 regulation wins, and an overtime loss. Alexandre Fortin led all scorers in the event with four points.

Date	Location	CHL team	Russia	Report
November 7, 2016	Prince George, British Columbia	WHL 2	3 Russia	(OT)
November 8, 2016	Edmonton, Alberta	WHL 4	1 Russia	
November 10, 2016	North Bay, Ontario	OHL 3	4 Russia	
November 14, 2016	Hamilton, Ontario	OHL 5	2 Russia	
November 15, 2016	Chicoutimi, Quebec	QMJHL 4	0 Russia	
November 17, 2016	Baie-Comeau, Quebec	QMJHL 4	1 Russia	
CHL wins 13 points to 5 (22-11 CHL)

== 2017 CIBC Canada/Russia Series ==
The 2017 series was tied with three regulation wins each. The CHL prevailed after a shootout, held at the conclusion of game six. Dillon Dubé led the CHL with five points. Alexey Polodyan led Russia with three goals and three assists.

Date	Location	CHL team	Russia	Report
November 6, 2017	Moose Jaw, Saskatchewan	WHL 7	0 Russia	
November 7, 2017	Swift Current, Saskatchewan	WHL 3	4 Russia	
November 9, 2017	Owen Sound, Ontario	OHL 2	5 Russia	
November 13, 2017	Sudbury, Ontario	OHL 4	2 Russia	
November 14, 2017	Charlottetown, Prince Edward Island	QMJHL 3	1 Russia	
November 16, 2017	Moncton, New Brunswick	QMJHL 1	2 Russia	SO (1:0)
CHL wins following a deciding shootout, 9-9 in points after six games

== 2018 CIBC Canada/Russia Series ==
Russia won the 2018 series 11 points to 7, after a come-from-behind overtime win in game six. Stepan Starkov led Russia in scoring with 6 points, and goaltender Pyotr Kochetkov won three games, allowing only two goals against.

Date	Location	CHL team	Russia	Report
November 5, 2018	Kamloops, British Columbia	WHL 2	1 Russia	
November 6, 2018	Langley, British Columbia	WHL 1	3 Russia	
November 8, 2018	Sarnia, Ontario	OHL 3	1 Russia	
November 12, 2018	Oshawa, Ontario	OHL 0	4 Russia	
November 13, 2018	Sherbrooke, Quebec	QMJHL 1	5 Russia	
November 15, 2018	Drummondville, Quebec	QMJHL 2	3 Russia	(OT)
Russia wins the series 11 points to 7

== 2019 CIBC Canada/Russia Series ==
The 2019 series was tied with nine points each. The CHL prevailed after a shootout, held at the conclusion of game six.

Date	Location	CHL team	Russia	Report
November 4, 2019	Saint John, New Brunswick	QMJHL 3	4 Russia	
November 5, 2019	Moncton, New Brunswick	QMJHL 4	3 Russia	(OT)
November 7, 2019	Kitchener, Ontario	OHL 4	1 Russia	
November 11, 2019	London, Ontario	OHL 2	3 Russia	(SO)
November 13, 2019	Saskatoon, Saskatchewan	WHL 2	1 Russia	(OT)
November 14, 2019	Prince Albert, Saskatchewan	WHL 3	4 Russia	(SO)
CHL wins following a deciding shootout, 9-9 in points after six games

== Series cancellation ==
The planned 2020 and 2021 Canada/Russia Series were both cancelled due to the COVID-19 pandemic. The 2022 Canada/Russia Series was cancelled in response to Russia's invasion of Ukraine in February 2022.

== All-time record ==
The Canadian Hockey League has won 12 of the 17 series played as of 2019.

Updated through November 15, 2019

TEAM	GP	W	OTW	L	OTL	GF	GA
Russia	102	26	10	61	5	259	382
WHL	34	20	2	8	4	131	80
OHL	34	25	1	6	2	128	74
QMJHL	34	16	2	12	4	123	105
CHL Totals	102	61	5	26	10	382	259

== See also ==
- 2007 Super Series
- 2012 Canada–Russia Challenge
