= Aleksandr Popov (ice hockey) =

Russian professional ice hockey forward (born 1980)

Alexander Popov
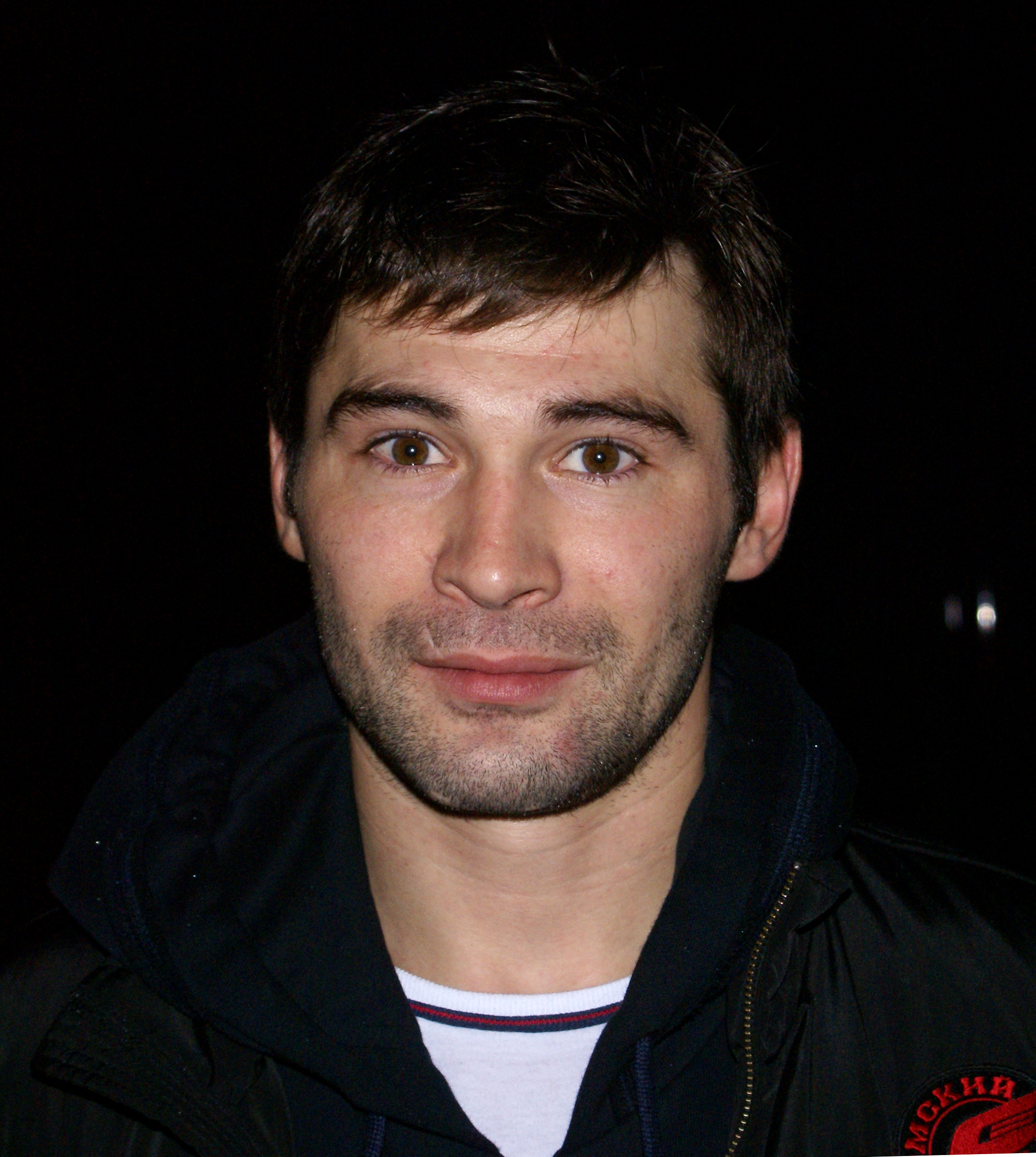
- Born: 31 August 1980 (age 45) Angarsk, Russian SFSR, Soviet Union
- Height: 5 ft 10 in (178 cm)
- Weight: 181 lb (82 kg; 12 st 13 lb)
- Position: Left wing
- Shoots: Right
- KHL team Former teams: CSKA Moscow; Avangard Omsk
- National team: Russia
- Playing career: 1998–present

Alexander Alexandrovich Popov (Russian: Алекса́ндр Алекса́ндрович Попо́в; born 31 August 1980) is a Russian professional ice hockey forward who currently plays for HC CSKA Moscow of the Kontinental Hockey League (KHL). He previously played his whole professional career for Avangard Omsk, during which time he became a legend and cult figure for fans. He is the all-time scoring leader of Avangard.

After 18 professional seasons with Omsk, Popov opted to leave as a free agent and signed a two-year contract with fellow KHL participants, HC CSKA Moscow, on 25 July 2016.

== Career statistics ==
=== Regular season and playoffs ===
			Regular season					Playoffs
Season	Team	League	GP	G	A	Pts	PIM	GP	G	A	Pts	PIM
1996–97	Yermak Angarsk	RUS.3	4	1	0	1	0	—	—	—	—	—
1997–98	Avangard–2 Omsk	RUS.3	30	3	13	16	28	—	—	—	—	—
1998–99	Avangard Omsk	RSL	4	0	0	0	0	1	0	0	0	0
1998–99	Avangard–2 Omsk	RUS.3	32	14	21	35	22	—	—	—	—	—
1999–2000	Avangard Omsk	RSL	22	0	4	4	20	8	0	1	1	14
1999–2000	Avangard–2 Omsk	RUS.3	16	12	12	24	8	—	—	—	—	—
2000–01	Avangard Omsk	RSL	36	6	7	13	26	15	4	3	7	10
2001–02	Avangard Omsk	RSL	35	4	11	15	14	11	0	2	2	6
2002–03	Avangard Omsk	RSL	6	0	0	0	2	11	0	0	0	6
2002–03	Avangard–2 Omsk	RUS.3	6	5	3	8	2	—	—	—	—	—
2003–04	Avangard Omsk	RSL	39	9	9	18	28	4	0	0	0	0
2003–04	Avangard–2 Omsk	RUS.3	4	1	2	3	2	—	—	—	—	—
2004–05	Avangard Omsk	RSL	46	6	6	12	20	10	1	0	1	2
2004–05	Avangard–2 Omsk	RUS.3	2	1	4	5	2	—	—	—	—	—
2005–06	Avangard Omsk	RSL	24	5	6	11	6	13	1	3	4	4
2006–07	Avangard Omsk	RSL	54	7	18	25	12	11	0	3	3	4
2007–08	Avangard Omsk	RSL	57	11	22	33	22	2	0	1	1	0
2008–09	Avangard Omsk	KHL	56	14	26	40	30	9	1	5	6	0
2009–10	Avangard Omsk	KHL	49	6	21	27	16	3	0	0	0	0
2010–11	Avangard Omsk	KHL	48	9	23	32	14	14	3	9	12	2
2011–12	Avangard Omsk	KHL	44	9	14	23	14	21	4	7	11	10
2012–13	Avangard Omsk	KHL	37	7	24	31	4	12	1	3	4	10
2013–14	Avangard Omsk	KHL	50	15	19	34	8	—	—	—	—	—
2014–15	Avangard Omsk	KHL	55	15	28	43	4	12	0	7	7	2
2015–16	Avangard Omsk	KHL	37	5	11	16	6	9	1	3	4	0
2016–17	CSKA Moscow	KHL	51	13	20	33	12	10	2	1	3	2
2017–18	CSKA Moscow	KHL	36	7	12	19	2	21	2	11	13	0
2018–19	CSKA Moscow	KHL	43	3	11	14	4	14	1	2	3	4
2019–20	CSKA Moscow	KHL	39	3	9	12	6	3	0	0	0	0
2020–21	CSKA Moscow	KHL	36	2	11	13	12	15	1	3	4	0
2021–22	CSKA Moscow	KHL	28	4	6	10	4	19	5	4	9	4
RSL totals			323	48	83	131	150	86	6	13	19	46
KHL totals			609	112	235	347	136	162	21	55	76	34

=== International ===
Year	Team	Event	Result	GP	G	A	Pts	PIM
2012	Russia	WC	1st place, gold medalist(s)	10	4	8	12	2
2013	Russia	WC	6th	8	0	4	4	0
2014	Russia	OG	5th	5	0	0	0	0
Senior totals				23	4	12	16	2

== Awards and honors ==
Award	Year
RSL
Champion (Avangard Omsk)	2004
KHL
All-Star Game	2014
Gagarin Cup (CSKA Moscow)	2019, 2022
