= Renat Mamashev =

Russian ice hockey player

- Born: March 31, 1983 (age 42) Moscow, USSR
- Height: 6 ft 1 in (185 cm)
- Weight: 192 lb (87 kg; 13 st 10 lb)
- Position: Defence
- Shot: Left
- Played for: HC Dynamo Moscow; Torpedo Nizhny Novgorod; HC Neftekhimik Nizhnekamsk; Metallurg Magnitogorsk; Traktor Chelyabinsk; HC Sibir Novosibirsk; HC Sochi; Admiral Vladivostok; Krylya Sovetov Moscow; HC Sarov
- NHL draft: Undrafted
- Playing career: 2004–2018

Renat Mamashev (born March 31, 1983) is a Russian former professional ice hockey defenceman who last played for Admiral Vladivostok of the Kontinental Hockey League (KHL). He has most notably played for HC Neftekhimik Nizhnekamsk of the KHL.

After 16 professional seasons in Russia and at the conclusion of the 2017–18 season, Mamashev announced his retirement from hockey on August 9, 2018.

On July 1, 2021, Mamashev was hired by Hockey Club “Sochi” to serve as a sports director.

== Career statistics ==
			Regular season					Playoffs
Season	Team	League	GP	G	A	Pts	PIM	GP	G	A	Pts	PIM
1999–00	Krylya Sovetov Moscow-2	Russia3	20	3	1	4	14	—	—	—	—	—
2000–01	Moose Jaw Warriors	WHL	72	5	12	17	63	4	0	0	0	0
2001–02	HC CSKA Moscow	Russia2	8	0	0	0	2	—	—	—	—	—
2001–02	HC CSKA Moscow-2	Russia3	33	5	15	20	70	—	—	—	—	—
2003–04	Krylya Sovetov Moscow	Russia2	39	1	6	7	40	4	1	0	1	2
2003–04	Krylya Sovetov Moscow-2	Russia3	19	5	6	11	14	—	—	—	—	—
2004–05	Krylya Sovetov Moscow	Russia2	48	2	6	8	34	3	0	0	0	4
2004–05	Krylya Sovetov Moscow-2	Russia3	1	0	0	0	0	—	—	—	—	—
2005–06	Krylya Sovetov Moscow	Russia2	56	8	26	34	65	15	4	7	11	14
2006–07	HC Dynamo Moscow	Russia	53	6	14	20	82	3	0	1	1	0
2007–08	HC Dynamo Moscow	Russia	17	0	0	0	39	—	—	—	—	—
2007–08	HC Dynamo Moscow-2	Russia3	1	0	1	1	2	—	—	—	—	—
2007–08	Torpedo Nizhny Novgorod	Russia	32	3	1	4	36	—	—	—	—	—
2008–09	Torpedo Nizhny Novgorod	KHL	51	7	10	17	87	3	1	0	1	0
2008–09	Torpedo Nizhny Novgorod-2	Russia3	—	0	1	1	—	—	—	—	—	—
2009–10	Torpedo Nizhny Novgorod	KHL	8	1	1	2	6	—	—	—	—	—
2009–10	Neftekhimik Nizhnekamsk	KHL	30	1	8	9	30	9	0	5	5	4
2010–11	Neftekhimik Nizhnekamsk	KHL	50	6	13	19	68	7	2	2	4	6
2011–12	Metallurg Magnitogorsk	KHL	16	2	4	6	16	—	—	—	—	—
2011–12	Neftekhimik Nizhnekamsk	KHL	18	0	7	7	18	—	—	—	—	—
2012–13	Neftekhimik Nizhnekamsk	KHL	52	10	32	42	72	4	0	1	1	2
2013–14	Traktor Chelyabinsk	KHL	4	0	0	0	2	—	—	—	—	—
2013–14	Chelmet Chelyabinsk	VHL	2	0	1	1	2	—	—	—	—	—
2013–14	Neftekhimik Nizhnekamsk	KHL	32	5	7	12	12	—	—	—	—	—
2014–15	Sibir Novosibirsk	KHL	33	2	11	13	24	7	1	0	1	0
2015–16	HC Sochi	KHL	53	5	16	21	56	4	0	1	1	8
2016–17	HC Sochi	KHL	47	4	13	17	24	—	—	—	—	—
2017–18	Torpedo Nizhny Novgorod	KHL	18	2	1	3	12	—	—	—	—	—
2017–18	HC Sarov	VHL	9	2	11	13	4	—	—	—	—	—
2017–18	Admiral Vladivostok	KHL	19	1	3	4	22	—	—	—	—	—
KHL totals			431	46	126	172	447	34	4	9	13	20
