= Kirill Koltsov =

Russian ice hockey player

- Born: February 1, 1983 (age 43) Chelyabinsk, Russian SFSR, USSR
- Height: 5 ft 10 in (178 cm)
- Weight: 198 lb (90 kg; 14 st 2 lb)
- Position: Defence
- Shot: Left
- Played for: Avangard Omsk; Salavat Yulaev Ufa; SKA Saint Petersburg; Torpedo Nizhny Novgorod; Traktor Chelyabinsk; Spartak Moscow; Avtomobilist Yekaterinburg
- National team: Russia
- NHL draft: 49th overall, 2002; Vancouver Canucks
- Playing career: 1999–2019

Kirill Koltsov (born February 1, 1983) is a Russian former ice hockey defenceman. He was selected by the Vancouver Canucks in the 2nd round (49th overall) of the 2002 NHL entry draft.

== Career statistics ==
=== Regular season and playoffs ===
			Regular season					Playoffs
Season	Team	League	GP	G	A	Pts	PIM	GP	G	A	Pts	PIM
1998–99	Streetsville Derbys	OPJHL	11	1	2	3	4	—	—	—	—	—
1999–2000	Avangard Omsk	RSL	2	0	0	0	0	—	—	—	—	—
1999–2000	Avangard–VDV Omsk	RUS.3	27	0	7	7	30	—	—	—	—	—
2000–01	Avangard Omsk	RSL	38	0	1	1	20	16	1	3	4	12
2001–02	Avangard Omsk	RSL	41	1	5	6	34	11	1	0	1	18
2001–02	Avangard–VDV Omsk	RUS.3	2	0	0	0	0	—	—	—	—	—
2002–03	Avangard Omsk	RSL	45	4	8	12	54	12	1	3	4	8
2003–04	Manitoba Moose	AHL	74	7	25	32	62	—	—	—	—	—
2004–05	Manitoba Moose	AHL	28	3	14	17	43	—	—	—	—	—
2004–05	Avangard Omsk	RSL	22	2	2	4	46	10	0	1	1	18
2005–06	Avangard Omsk	RSL	43	9	8	17	98	13	4	5	9	10
2006–07	Avangard Omsk	RSL	51	9	31	40	46	11	3	4	7	14
2007–08	Salavat Yulaev Ufa	RSL	50	5	17	22	42	11	0	6	6	6
2008–09	Salavat Yulaev Ufa	KHL	49	5	20	25	81	3	0	0	0	2
2009–10	Salavat Yulaev Ufa	KHL	45	6	16	22	40	11	1	5	6	18
2010–11	Salavat Yulaev Ufa	KHL	50	5	20	25	60	21	2	9	11	14
2011–12	SKA St. Petersburg	KHL	52	3	32	35	72	15	1	9	10	14
2012–13	Salavat Yulaev Ufa	KHL	36	3	10	13	36	14	0	8	8	8
2013–14	Salavat Yulaev Ufa	KHL	48	11	24	35	42	15	1	9	10	2
2014–15	Salavat Yulaev Ufa	KHL	60	18	30	48	30	5	0	0	0	2
2015–16	Salavat Yulaev Ufa	KHL	23	1	10	11	22	—	—	—	—	—
2015–16	Torpedo Nizhny Novgorod	KHL	16	1	10	11	10	—	—	—	—	—
2016–17	Traktor Chelyabinsk	KHL	60	12	17	29	14	6	1	4	5	4
2017–18	Traktor Chelyabinsk	KHL	29	1	8	9	8	—	—	—	—	—
2017–18	Spartak Moscow	KHL	13	2	5	7	2	2	0	0	0	0
2018–19	Buran Voronezh	VHL	10	1	6	7	32	—	—	—	—	—
2018–19	Avtomobilist Yekaterinburg	KHL	9	0	2	2	2	—	—	—	—	—
RSL totals			292	30	72	102	340	84	10	22	32	86
KHL totals			490	68	204	272	419	92	6	44	50	64

=== International ===
Year	Team	Event	GP	G	A	Pts	PIM
2001	Russia	WJC18	6	1	6	7	16
2003	Russia	WJC	6	2	3	5	6
2006	Russia	WC	6	0	0	0	27
Junior totals			12	3	9	12	22
Senior totals			6	0	0	0	27
