= Denis Denisov =

Russian ice hockey player (born 1981)

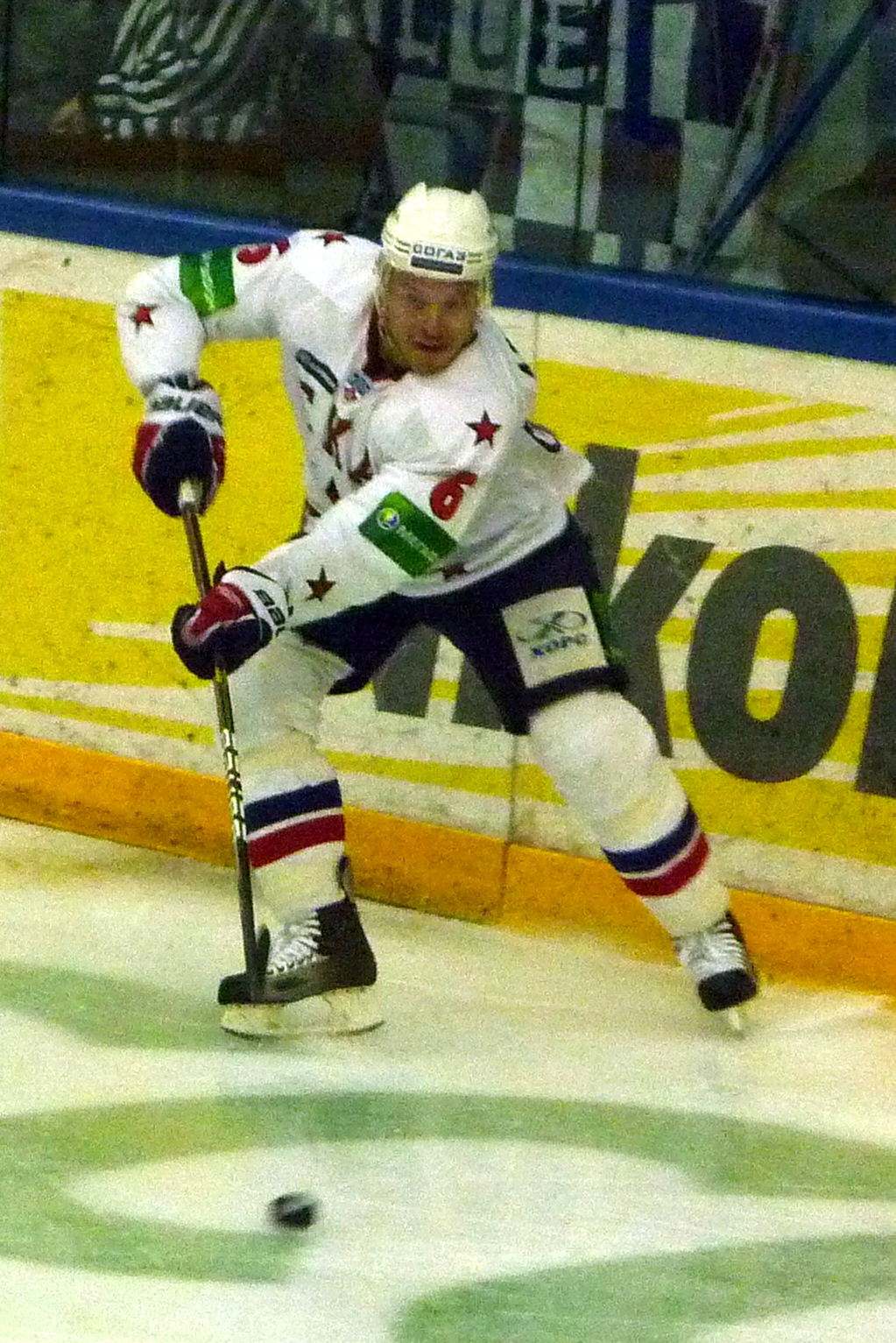
- Born: December 31, 1981 (age 44) Kharkiv, Ukrainian SSR, Soviet Union
- Height: 6 ft 0 in (183 cm)
- Weight: 183 lb (83 kg; 13 st 1 lb)
- Position: Defence
- Shot: Left
- Played for: CSKA Moscow; Krylia Sovetov Moscow; Salavat Yulaev Ufa; Ak Bars Kazan; Avangard Omsk; HC Dynamo Moscow; SKA St. Petersburg; Metallurg Magnitogorsk
- National team: Russia
- NHL draft: 149th overall, 2000; Buffalo Sabres
- Playing career: 1997–2018

Denis Valeryevich Denisov (Russian: Денис Валерьевич Денисов; born December 31, 1981) is a Russian former professional ice hockey defenceman who played in the Kontinental Hockey League (KHL). He was selected by Buffalo Sabres in the 5th round (149th overall) of the 2000 NHL entry draft.

== Early life ==
Denisov was born into a military family, stationed in Kharkiv at the time of his birth. The family later moved to Tver, and he began playing hockey at the age of 9.

== Playing career ==
He formerly played as Captain for HC CSKA Moscow from 2012–13 to the 2016–17 season. On May 1, 2017, Denisov opted to continue his KHL career with finalists, Metallurg Magnitogorsk, agreeing to a two-year contract.

== International play ==
Medal record

Representing Russia

Ice hockey

World Championships
Gold medal – first place	2014 Minsk	
Gold medal – first place	2012 Stockholm	
Bronze medal – third place	2005 Innsbruck	

World Junior Championships
Silver medal – second place	2000 Skellefteå	

Denisov was named to the Russia men's national ice hockey team for competition at the 2014 IIHF World Championship. Denisov played a good tournament producing in 10 games 0 goals and 1 assist.

== Career statistics ==
=== Regular season and playoffs ===
			Regular season					Playoffs
Season	Team	League	GP	G	A	Pts	PIM	GP	G	A	Pts	PIM
1996–97	THK Tver	RUS.3	9	0	0	0	0	—	—	—	—	—
1997–98	CSKA Moscow	RSL	7	0	0	0	4	—	—	—	—	—
1998–99	CSKA Moscow	RUS.2	27	0	5	5	10	—	—	—	—	—
1999–2000	CSKA Moscow	RUS.2	40	1	8	9	22	—	—	—	—	—
1999–2000	CSKA–2 Moscow	RUS.3	4	1	1	2	0	—	—	—	—	—
2000–01	CSKA Moscow	RUS.2	32	0	3	3	20	—	—	—	—	—
2000–01	CSKA–2 Moscow	RUS.3	3	0	1	1	26	—	—	—	—	—
2001–02	Krylia Sovetov Moscow	RSL	46	3	4	7	37	—	—	—	—	—
2001–02	Krylia Sovetov–2 Moscow	RUS.3	3	0	1	1	18	—	—	—	—	—
2002–03	Salavat Yulaev Ufa	RSL	50	2	8	10	12	3	0	1	1	0
2002–03	Salavat Yulaev–2 Ufa	RUS.3	2	0	0	0	4	—	—	—	—	—
2003–04	Ak Bars Kazan	RSL	51	4	11	15	34	7	0	0	0	4
2004–05	Ak Bars Kazan	RSL	57	4	7	11	30	4	0	0	0	2
2005–06	Ak Bars Kazan	RSL	22	0	2	2	51	2	0	0	0	4
2006–07	Avangard Omsk	RSL	52	2	10	12	32	11	1	2	3	16
2007–08	Avangard Omsk	RSL	51	7	12	19	34	4	0	2	2	4
2008–09	Dynamo Moscow	KHL	56	7	15	22	95	10	2	2	4	10
2009–10	Dynamo Moscow	KHL	54	8	12	20	69	4	1	0	1	4
2010–11	SKA St. Petersburg	KHL	48	4	12	16	42	11	3	2	5	8
2011–12	SKA St. Petersburg	KHL	42	7	16	23	66	14	0	1	1	34
2012–13	CSKA Moscow	KHL	50	6	8	14	25	9	0	1	1	6
2013–14	CSKA Moscow	KHL	44	5	6	11	22	4	0	0	0	2
2014–15	CSKA Moscow	KHL	55	3	22	25	40	16	1	3	4	16
2015–16	CSKA Moscow	KHL	45	3	16	19	46	19	2	5	7	25
2016–17	CSKA Moscow	KHL	50	7	18	25	44	9	0	0	0	4
2017–18	Metallurg Magnitogorsk	KHL	46	0	8	8	12	11	0	2	2	4
RSL totals			336	22	54	76	234	59	4	7	11	44
KHL totals			490	50	133	183	461	107	9	16	25	113

=== International ===
Year	Team	Event	Result	GP	G	A	Pts	PIM
1999	Russia	WJC18	6th	7	0	2	2	0
2000	Russia	WJC	2nd place, silver medalist(s)	7	1	1	2	0
2001	Russia	WJC	7th	7	1	2	3	2
2005	Russia	WC	3rd place, bronze medalist(s)	9	0	1	1	4
2012	Russia	WC	1st place, gold medalist(s)	10	2	1	3	2
2013	Russia	WC	6th	8	1	1	2	4
2014	Russia	WC	1st place, gold medalist(s)	10	0	1	1	10
Junior totals				21	2	5	7	2
Senior totals				37	3	4	7	20
