= Ilya Gorokhov =

Russian ice hockey player

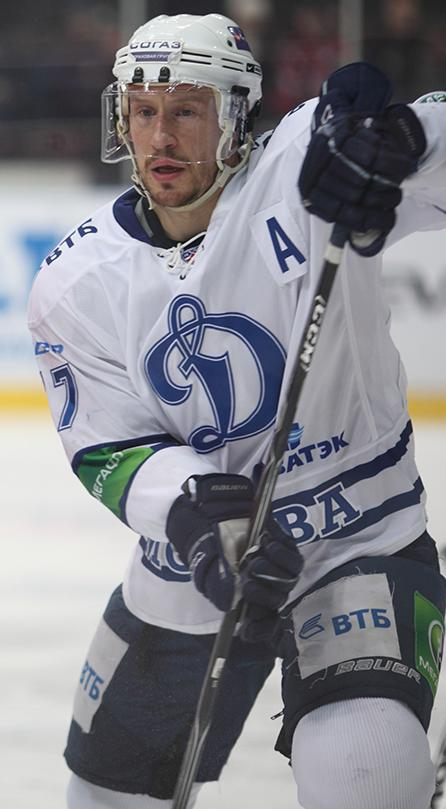
- Born: 23 August 1977 (age 48) Yaroslavl, Russia
- Height: 5 ft 11 in (180 cm)
- Weight: 203 lb (92 kg; 14 st 7 lb)
- Position: Defence
- Shot: Right
- Played for: Lokomotiv Yaroslavl; Salavat Yulaev Ufa; CSK VVS Samara; Torpedo Nizhny Novgorod; HC Lada Togliatti; Atlant Moscow Oblast; HC Dynamo Moscow; HC Sochi; Amur Khabarovsk
- NHL draft: 195th overall, 1995; New York Rangers
- Playing career: 1994–2017

Ilya Gorokhov (born 23 August 1977) is a Russian former professional ice hockey defenceman. He last played with Amur Khabarovsk of the Kontinental Hockey League (KHL). Gorokhov was selected by the New York Rangers in the 8th round (195th overall) of the 1995 NHL entry draft, originally playing in the Russian Superleague with Lokomotiv Yaroslavl.

He was the last member of the Las Vegas Thunder of the IHL to be active in playing professional hockey. On May 2, 2016, Gorokhov added his veteran presence to HC Sochi, agreeing as a free agent to a one-year deal. He played 27 games with Sochi before he was traded to end his 23-year professional career with Amur Khabarovsk to conclude the 2016–17 season.

== Career statistics ==
=== Regular season and playoffs ===
			Regular season					Playoffs
Season	Team	League	GP	G	A	Pts	PIM	GP	G	A	Pts	PIM
1992–93	Yarinterkom Yaroslavl	RUS.2	2	0	0	0	2	—	—	—	—	—
1993–94	Torpedo–2 Yaroslavl	RUS.3	39	2	0	2	14	—	—	—	—	—
1994–95	Torpedo Yaroslavl	RUS	1	0	0	0	0	—	—	—	—	—
1994–95	Torpedo–2 Yaroslavl	RUS.2	53	4	4	8	36	—	—	—	—	—
1995–96	Torpedo Yaroslavl	RUS	43	0	3	3	10	2	0	0	0	0
1995–96	Torpedo–2 Yaroslavl	RUS.2	4	0	0	0	2	—	—	—	—	—
1996–97	Las Vegas Thunder	IHL	1	0	0	0	0	—	—	—	—	—
1996–97	Torpedo Yaroslavl	RSL	22	1	1	2	6	9	1	0	1	2
1996–97	Torpedo–2 Yaroslavl	RUS.3	7	1	3	4	60	—	—	—	—	—
1997–98	Torpedo Yaroslavl	RSL	5	0	1	1	4	1	0	0	0	12
1997–98	Torpedo–2 Yaroslavl	RUS.2	18	1	6	7	26	—	—	—	—	—
1997–98	Salavat Yulaev Ufa	RSL	9	0	0	0	8	—	—	—	—	—
1997–98	CSK VVS Samara	RSL	7	0	1	1	8	2	0	0	0	0
1997–98	CSK VVS–2 Samara	RUS.3	2	1	0	1	8	—	—	—	—	—
1998–99	Torpedo Yaroslavl	RSL	3	0	0	0	10	—	—	—	—	—
1998–99	Torpedo–2 Yaroslavl	RUS.2	2	0	4	4	4	—	—	—	—	—
1998–99	Torpedo Nizhny Novgorod	RUS.2	24	5	2	7	20	—	—	—	—	—
1999–2000	Torpedo Nizhny Novgorod	RSL	37	1	6	7	61	5	0	2	2	6
2000–01	Lokomotiv Yaroslavl	RSL	44	5	7	12	40	11	1	2	3	8
2001–02	Lokomotiv Yaroslavl	RSL	44	3	7	10	53	—	—	—	—	—
2002–03	Lada Togliatti	RSL	29	1	2	3	14	—	—	—	—	—
2002–03	Lokomotiv Yaroslavl	RSL	17	1	1	2	18	1	0	0	0	4
2003–04	Lokomotiv Yaroslavl	RSL	39	0	3	3	20	—	—	—	—	—
2003–04	Lokomotiv–2 Yaroslavl	RUS.3	2	2	0	2	0	—	—	—	—	—
2004–05	Lokomotiv Yaroslavl	RSL	51	5	11	16	34	5	1	0	1	8
2005–06	Lokomotiv Yaroslavl	RSL	51	8	9	17	26	11	2	1	3	8
2006–07	Lokomotiv Yaroslavl	RSL	45	4	6	10	32	4	0	1	1	2
2007–08	Lokomotiv Yaroslavl	RSL	49	4	3	7	38	16	0	1	1	12
2008–09	Lokomotiv Yaroslavl	KHL	31	1	3	4	50	9	1	3	4	12
2009–10	Salavat Yulaev Ufa	KHL	36	7	8	15	24	9	0	1	1	6
2010–11	Atlant Moscow Oblast	KHL	54	4	8	12	48	24	5	7	12	22
2011–12	Dynamo Moscow	KHL	44	9	4	13	38	21	3	8	11	18
2012–13	Dynamo Moscow	KHL	43	7	16	23	61	21	1	3	4	12
2013–14	Lokomotiv Yaroslavl	KHL	48	2	12	14	49	18	2	5	7	22
2014–15	Lokomotiv Yaroslavl	KHL	53	4	7	11	54	6	0	2	2	14
2015–16	Lokomotiv Yaroslavl	KHL	56	2	10	12	22	5	0	0	0	12
2016–17	HC Sochi	KHL	27	1	5	6	16	—	—	—	—	—
2016–17	Amur Khabarovsk	KHL	14	2	1	3	14	—	—	—	—	—
RUS & RSL totals			496	33	61	94	382	67	5	7	12	106
KHL totals			406	39	74	113	376	113	12	29	41	118

=== International ===
Year	Team	Event	GP	G	A	Pts	PIM
1994	Russia	U17	—	—	—	—	—
1996	Russia	WJC	7	0	1	1	0
1997	Russia	WJC	6	0	1	1	8
Junior totals			13	0	2	2	8
