= Khlystov =

Khlystov or Hlystov (Russian: Хлыстов, from хлыст meaning whip) is a Russian masculine surname, its feminine counterpart is Khlystova or Hlystova. It may refer to:

- Denis Khlystov (born 1979), Russian ice hockey player
- Nikita Khlystov (born 1993), Russian ice hockey player
- Nikolay Khlystov (1932–1999), Russian ice hockey player
