= Evgeny Mityakin =

Russian ice hockey player

- Born: 24 December 1997 (age 28) Krasnokamsk, Russia
- Height: 6 ft 3 in (191 cm)
- Weight: 203 lb (92 kg; 14 st 7 lb)
- Position: Forward
- Shoots: Left
- KHL team Former teams: Neftekhimik Nizhnekamsk; Avtomobilist Yekaterinburg
- Playing career: 2015–present

Evgeny Mityakin (born 24 December 1997) is a Russian professional ice hockey player. He is currently playing within HC Neftekhimik Nizhnekamsk of the Kontinental Hockey League (KHL).

== Playing career ==
On 10 January 2015, Mityakin made his Kontinental Hockey League debut playing with Avtomobilist Yekaterinburg during the 2014–15 KHL season.

After spending his first seven professional seasons within Avtomobilist, Mityakin left the organization after he was traded to Neftekhimik Nizhnekamsk in exchange for the rights to Arsen Khisamutdinov on 1 May 2021.
