= Khisamutdinov =

Khisamutdinov (Russian: Хисамутдинов), female form Khisamutdinova (Russian: Хисамутдинова), is a Russian surname.

Notable people with this surname include:

- Arsen Khisamutdinov (born 1998), Russian ice hockey player
- Shamil Khisamutdinov (born 1950), Russian wrestler
