= Dmitri Makarov =

Dmitri Makarov may refer to:

- Dmitri Makarov (footballer) (born 1982), retired Russian footballer
- Dmitri Makarov (ice hockey) (born 1983), Russian ice hockey winger
