= Andrei Ivanov (ice hockey) =

Russian ice hockey player (born 1981)

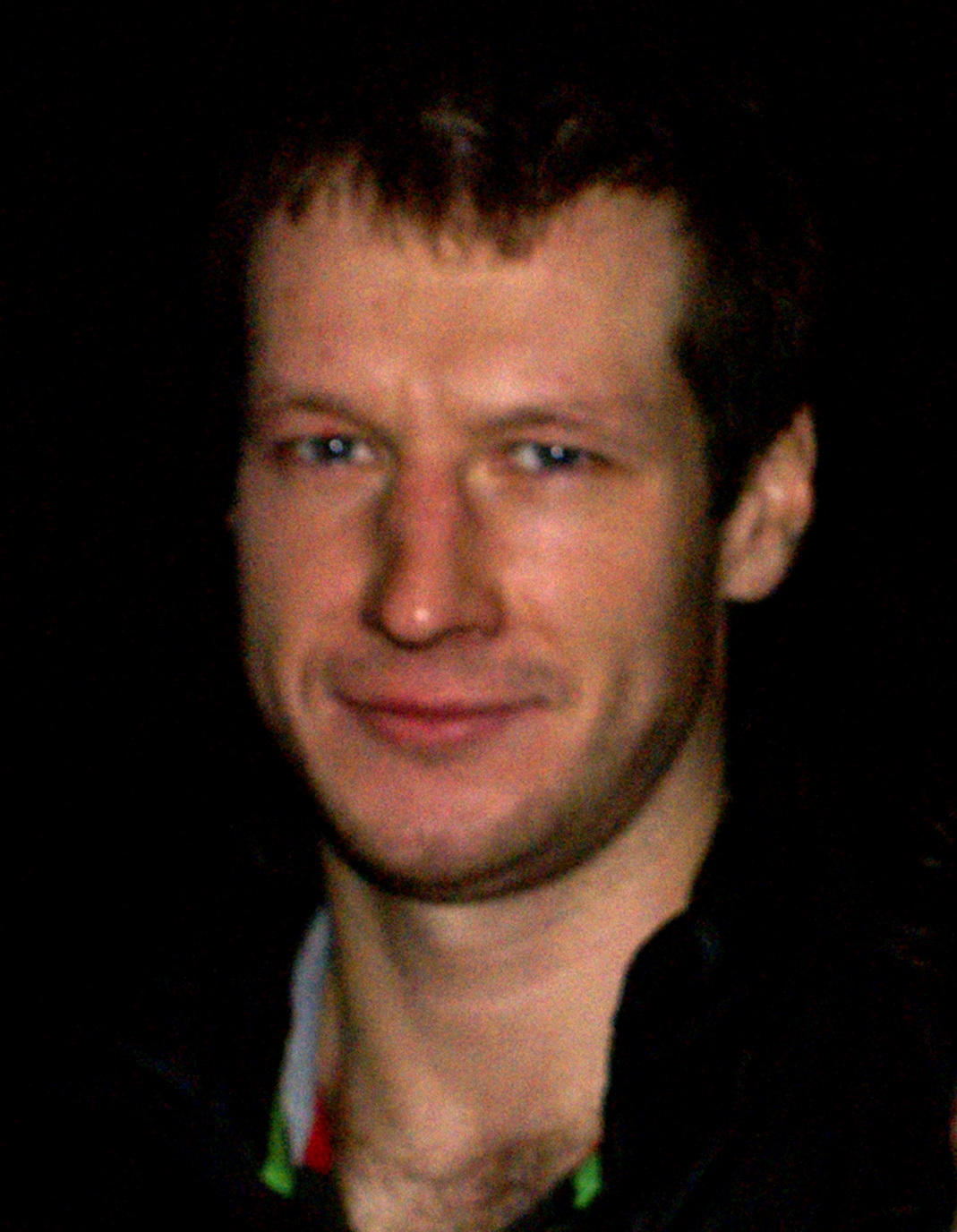
- Born: March 10, 1981 (age 44); Leningrad, Russian SFSR, Soviet Union
- Height: 6 ft 1 in (185 cm)
- Weight: 185 lb (84 kg; 13 st 3 lb)
- Position: Forward
- Shoots: Left
- EHL team Former teams: HK Välk 494 Tartu; SKA Saint Petersburg; HK Gomel; HC Neftekhimik Nizhnekamsk; Avangard Omsk; HC Yugra; Ak Bars Kazan; HC Lada Togliatti; HC Sochi
- Playing career: 2000–present

Andrei Ivanov (Russian: Андрей Александрович Иванов; born March 10, 1981) is a Russian professional ice hockey winger who plays for HK Välk 494 Tartu of the Estonian Hockey League. He has formerly played in the Kontinental Hockey League (KHL).
