= Igor Polygalov =

Russian ice hockey player

- Born: October 21, 1986 (age 39) Perm, Russian SFSR
- Height: 5 ft 10 in (178 cm)
- Weight: 187 lb (85 kg; 13 st 5 lb)
- Position: Center
- Shoots: Left
- team Former teams: Free agent Molot-Prikamie Perm; Severstal Cherepovets; Spartak Moscow; Neftekhimik Nizhnekamsk; Traktor Chelyabinsk; Dynamo Moscow
- Playing career: 2004–present

Igor Polygalov (born October 21, 1986) is a Russian professional ice hockey forward who is currently an unrestricted free agent. He most recently played for Dizel Penza in the Supreme Hockey League (VHL).

== Playing career ==
Polygalov previously joined Traktor Chelyabinsk prior to the 2017–18 season, after spending the previous 9 seasons in the KHL with HC Neftekhimik Nizhnekamsk. While scoring 28 points in 56 games in his first season in Chelyabinsk, Polygalov was signed to a two-year contract extension on February 15, 2018.

On July 16, 2019, Polygalov left Chelyabinsk to sign a one-year contract with his sixth top flight club, HC Dynamo Moscow. In his lone season under contract in 2019–20, he contributed with 8 goals and 14 points in 47 games. With the playoffs cancelled after completion of the first-round due to the COVID-19 pandemic, Polygalov left the club as a free agent.

On 28 June 2020, Polygalov returned for a second tenure with Traktor Chelyabinsk, agreeing to a one-year contract.
