= Maxim Pestushko =

Russian ice hockey player

- Born: February 9, 1985 (age 40) Naberezhnye Chelny, Russian SFSR, Soviet Union
- Height: 6 ft 0 in (183 cm)
- Weight: 192 lb (87 kg; 13 st 10 lb)
- Position: Forward
- Shot: Left
- KHL team Former teams: Free Agent; Neftekhimik Nizhnekamsk; Dynamo Moscow; Avangard Omsk; HC Yugra; Severstal Cherepovets
- Playing career: 2003–2022

Maxim Pestushko (born February 9, 1985) is a Russian former professional ice hockey player who most recently played within the Ak Bars Kazan organization in the Kontinental Hockey League (KHL). He previously played for HC Neftekhimik Nizhnekamsk, HC Dynamo Moscow, Avangard Omsk, HC Yugra and the Severstal Cherepovets in the KHL.
