= Fedor Malykhin =

Russian ice hockey player (1990–2025)

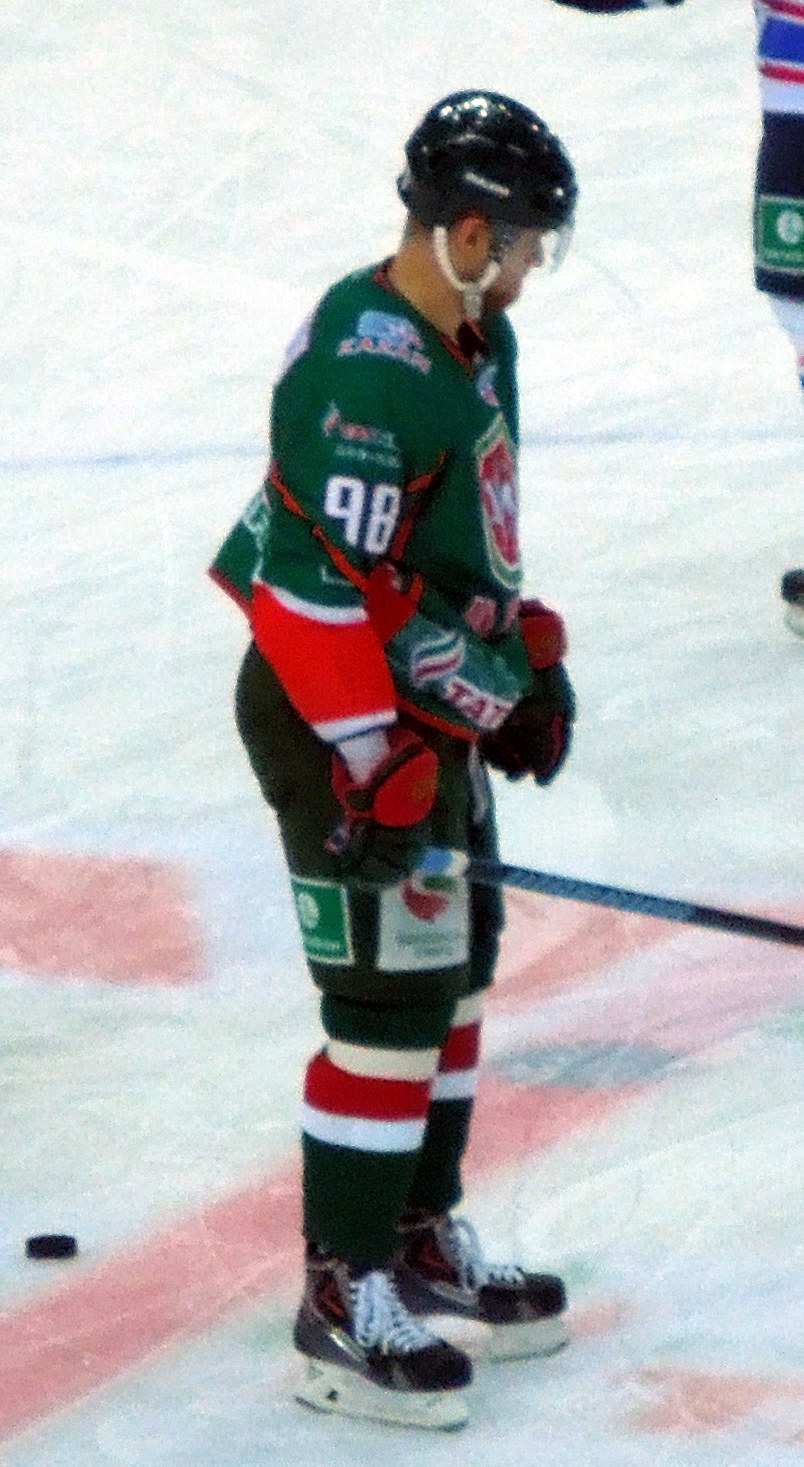
- Born: 13 November 1990; Sverdlovsk, Russian SFSR, Soviet Union
- Died: 18 March 2025 (aged 34); Yekaterinburg, Russia
- Height: 5 ft 11 in (180 cm)
- Weight: 185 lb (84 kg; 13 st 3 lb)
- Position: Forward
- Shot: Left
- Played for: Avtomobilist Yekaterinburg; Ak Bars Kazan; Traktor Chelyabinsk; Spartak Moscow; HC Vityaz; Avangard Omsk
- Playing career: 2007–2023

Fedor Malykhin (Russian: Фёдор Малыхин; 13 November 1990 – 18 March 2025) was a Russian professional ice hockey forward who most notably played in the Kontinental Hockey League (KHL).

== Early life ==
Malykhin was born in Sverdlovsk on 13 November 1990.

== Playing career ==
Malykhin began his Kontinental Hockey League (KHL) career with Avtomobilist Yekaterinburg. He played for the team from 2011 to 2014 and became the team's captain.

Ak Bars Kazan reportedly paid Avtomobilist 115 million rubles for Malykhin's transfer. Malykhin played with Ak Bars Kazan for five seasons. During his tenure with the team, he helped claim the Gagarin Cup in 2018 and appeared in the KHL All-Star Game during the 2013–14 season. Malykhin left as a free agent to sign a one-year contract with his third KHL club, Traktor Chelyabinsk, on 1 May 2019.

During the 2019–20 season, Malykhin appeared in 29 games for Traktor, posting three goals and four points. On 28 December 2019, Malykhin was traded by Chelyabinsk to Spartak Moscow in exchange for future considerations.

On 3 May 2020, having left Spartak as a free agent, Malykhin signed a one-year contract to continue in the KHL with HC Vityaz.

Following two seasons with Vityaz Podolsk, Malykhin continued in the KHL, signing as a free agent in agreeing to a two-year contract with Avangard Omsk on 22 May 2022.

During his KHL career, Malykhin played in 497 games, scoring 98 goals and 104 assists.

== Personal life ==
Malykhin married his wife in 2015. She had a son from a previous marriage and they had two daughters together. They were separated when Malykhin died.

== Death ==
Malykhin died in Yekaterinburg, Russia on 18 March 2025, at the age of 34. His body was discovered by his father in his apartment after he was not in contact with his family for three days; a detached blood clot or cardiac arrest due to drug overdose have been suggested as a possible cause of death.

Malykhin's former teams held moments of silence after his death.

== Career statistics ==
| | | | Regular season | | | | | Playoffs |
| Season | Team | League | GP | G | A | Pts | PIM | GP | G | A | Pts | PIM |
|---|---|---|---|---|---|---|---|---|---|---|---|---|
| 2007–08 | Avtomobilist Yekaterinburg-2 | Russia-3 | 48 | 12 | 21 | 33 | 28 | — | — | — | — | — |
| 2008–09 | Avtomobilist Yekaterinburg-2 | Russia-3 | 52 | 15 | 16 | 31 | 73 | — | — | — | — | — |
| 2009–10 | Avto Yekaterinburg | MHL | 54 | 42 | 30 | 72 | 60 | 7 | 2 | 1 | 3 | 2 |
| 2010–11 | Avtomobilist Yekaterinburg | KHL | 5 | 0 | 0 | 0 | 6 | — | — | — | — | — |
| 2010–11 | Avto Yekaterinburg | MHL | 33 | 25 | 27 | 52 | 40 | 6 | 5 | 3 | 8 | 35 |
| 2011–12 | Avtomobilist Yekaterinburg | KHL | 23 | 5 | 2 | 7 | 10 | — | — | — | — | — |
| 2011–12 | Avto Yekaterinburg | MHL | 1 | 1 | 1 | 2 | 4 | — | — | — | — | — |
| 2012–13 | Avtomobilist Yekaterinburg | KHL | 45 | 8 | 15 | 23 | 16 | — | — | — | — | — |
| 2013–14 | Avtomobilist Yekaterinburg | KHL | 54 | 22 | 22 | 44 | 26 | 4 | 2 | 2 | 4 | 6 |
| 2014–15 | Ak Bars Kazan | KHL | 37 | 6 | 4 | 10 | 26 | — | — | — | — | — |
| 2015–16 | Ak Bars Kazan | KHL | 41 | 9 | 12 | 21 | 32 | 7 | 1 | 1 | 2 | 2 |
| 2016–17 | Ak Bars Kazan | KHL | 51 | 16 | 11 | 27 | 56 | 15 | 6 | 3 | 9 | 10 |
| 2017–18 | Ak Bars Kazan | KHL | 26 | 3 | 11 | 14 | 37 | 5 | 0 | 0 | 0 | 0 |
| 2018–19 | Ak Bars Kazan | KHL | 15 | 1 | 1 | 2 | 16 | — | — | — | — | — |
| 2019–20 | Traktor Chelyabinsk | KHL | 29 | 3 | 1 | 4 | 14 | — | — | — | — | — |
| 2019–20 | Spartak Moscow | KHL | 11 | 4 | 1 | 5 | 8 | 6 | 0 | 1 | 1 | 6 |
| 2020–21 | HC Vityaz | KHL | 58 | 9 | 11 | 20 | 65 | — | — | — | — | — |
| 2021–22 | HC Vityaz | KHL | 41 | 9 | 7 | 16 | 32 | — | — | — | — | — |
| 2022–23 | Avangard Omsk | KHL | 61 | 3 | 6 | 9 | 24 | 14 | 0 | 2 | 2 | 8 |
| KHL totals | | | 497 | 98 | 104 | 202 | 368 | 51 | 9 | 8 | 17 | 32 |

== Awards and honours ==
| Award | Year |
|---|---|
KHL
| All-Star Game | 2014 |
| Gagarin Cup (Ak Bars Kazan) | 2018 |
