= Valery Belov =

Russian ice hockey player and coach (born 1967)

- Born: 24 January 1967 (age 59) Moscow, Russian SFSR, Soviet Union
- Height: 188 cm (6 ft 2 in)
- Weight: 88 kg (194 lb; 13 st 12 lb)
- Position: Left wing
- Shot: Left
- Played for: Lada Togliatti; Dynamo Moscow HC Opava; Vityaz Podolsk
- Current ZhHL coach: Sakhalin
- Coached for: Dynamo Moscow; Ak Bars Kazan; Vityaz Podolsk; Lada Togliatti; Metallurg Novokuznetsk; Neftyanik Almetievsk
- National team: Russia
- Playing career: 1987–2001
- Coaching career: 2000–present

Valery Gennadyevich Belov (Russian: Валерий Геннадьевич Белов; born 24 January 1967) is Soviet-born Russian ice hockey coach and retired professional ice hockey player. He has served as head coach to Sakhalin Yuzhno-Sakhalinsk in the Zhenskaya Hockey League (ZhHL) since 2025.

== Playing career ==
Belov began his playing career with HC Torpedo Togliatti in Class A2 of the Soviet Championship League during the 1987–88 season. He played six seasons with the team, which was renamed HC Lada Togliatti in 1989, and was part of the 1990–91 roster that earned promotion to the top division of the Soviet Championship League. In 1992, the top division of the Soviet Championship League became the International Hockey League (IHL).

Belov represented the Soviet Union in the men's ice hockey tournament at the 1991 Winter Universiade, winning a silver medal with the national university team.

He signed with HC Dynamo Moscow ahead of the 1993–94 IHL season. He played 36 of 52 games during the 1994–95 regular season but did not play any games during the 1995 IHL playoffs, in which Dynamo won the championship.

Opting to play abroad, Belov signed with EHC Chur of the Swiss National League B for the 1995–96 season. He ranked third on the team for scoring, with 19 goals and 45 points in 34 games, as the team finished at the bottom of the league table.

In the 1996–97 season, he played the Czech Extraliga with HC Bohemex Trade Opava. He amassed seventeen points (8+9) across 40 games as the team finished at the bottom of the league table.

After two international seasons, Belov returned to Russia and played the 1997–98 season and 1998–99 season with HC Dynamo Moscow in the Russian Superleague.

He joined HC Vityaz Podolsk for the 1999–2000 Vysshaya Liga season, in which the team earned promotion to the Russian Superleague. He served as a player-coach for Vityaz during the 2000–01 Russian Superleague season and the 2002–03 Vysshaya Liga season.

== Coaching career ==
Belov made his first foray into coaching as a player-assistant coach to HC Vityaz Podolsk during the 1999–2000 season. He stepped fully behind the bench to became head coach of Vityaz for the 2001–02 Vysshaya Liga season and achieved a third place finish in the season final. The next season, he returned to playing and once again served as a player-coach to Vityaz.

He served as an assistant coach with HC Dynamo Moscow in the Russian Superleague during the 2003–04 season and 2004–05 season and then served as an assistant coach with Ak Bars Kazan in the Russian Superleague during the 2005–06 season to the 2007–08 season.

The Russian Superleague was replaced by the Kontinental Hockey League (KHL) ahead of the 2008–09 season. Belov continued in his assistant coaching role with Ak Bars following the league restructuring through the 2010–11 season.

Belov joined the coaching staff of the Russian men's national team in the 2011–12 international season, which included the 2011–12 Euro Hockey Tour and a gold medal victory in the 2012 IIHF World Championship. He continued to serve as assistant coach during the following two seasons, including for the 2012–13 Euro Hockey Tour, the 2012 IIHF World Championship, and the men's ice hockey tournament at the 2014 Winter Olympics.

Belov served as head coach of Ak Bars Kazan during the 2012–13 KHL season and 2013–14 KHL season and then as an assistant coach during the 2014–15 KHL season and 2015–16 KHL season.

During the 2016–17 KHL season through the 2018–19 KHL season, he was head coach of HC Vityaz Podolsk.

He then spent three seasons as a head coach in the All-Russian Hockey League (VHL), first with Lada Togliatti during the 2021–22 and 2022–23 seasons and then with Metallurg Novokuznetsk during the 2023–24 season. For the 2024–25 VHL season, Belov served as an assistant coach with Neftyanik Almetievsk.

Belov became the first head coach of Sakhalin Yuzhno-Sakhalinsk as the team made its debut in the 2025–26 ZhHL season.
