= Ivan Lisutin =

Russian ice hockey player

- Born: February 23, 1987 (age 38); Tyumen, Russian SFSR
- Height: 6 ft 2 in (188 cm)
- Weight: 216 lb (98 kg; 15 st 6 lb)
- Position: Goaltender
- Catches: Left
- Slovak team Former teams: HC '05 Banská Bystrica; Avtomobilist Yekaterinburg; Metallurg Magnitogorsk; Vityaz Podolsk; Torpedo Nizhny Novgorod; Neftekhimik Nizhnekamsk; KHL Medveščak Zagreb
- Playing career: 2006–present

Ivan Lisutin (born February 23, 1987) is a Russian professional ice hockey goaltender who currently plays for HC '05 Banská Bystrica of the Slovak Extraliga (Slovak).

Lisutin has formerly played in the Kontinental Hockey League (KHL), notably playing in two stints with Torpedo Nizhny Novgorod in agreeing to a one-year deal on May 1, 2017.
