= Jaroslav Janus =

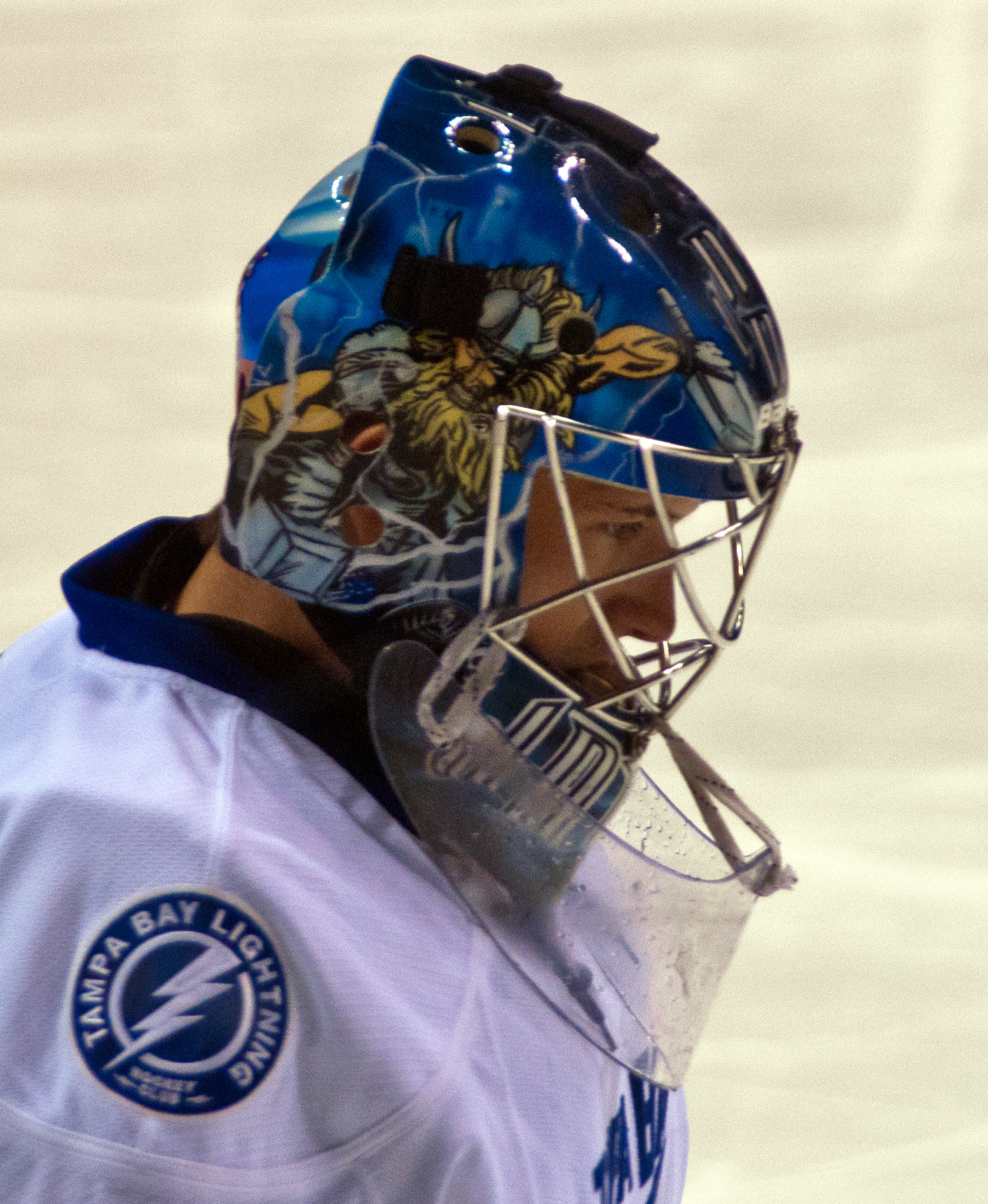
- Janus with the Tampa Bay Lightning in 2011
- Born: 21 September 1989 (age 36) Prešov, Czechoslovakia (present Slovakia)
- Height: 6 ft 1 in (185 cm)
- Weight: 190 lb (86 kg; 13 st 8 lb)
- Position: Goaltender
- Catches: Left
- Slovak Extraliga team Former teams: HC Slovan Bratislava; HC Košice; Norfolk Admirals; HC Slovan Bratislava; HC Sparta Praha; HC Litvínov; Bílí Tygři Liberec; Fehérvár AV19; SaiPa; Rytíři Kladno; HC Prešov
- National team: Slovakia
- NHL draft: 162nd overall, 2009; Tampa Bay Lightning
- Playing career: 2009–present

Jaroslav Janus (born 21 September 1989) is a Slovak professional ice hockey goaltender. He is currently playing for HC Slovan Bratislava of the Slovak Extraliga.

Janus was selected by the Tampa Bay Lightning in the 6th round (162nd overall) of the 2008 NHL entry draft.

== Playing career ==
As a youth, Janus played in his native Slovakia, in the junior program of HC Slovan Bratislava. After his selection to the Lightning in the 2009 NHL entry draft, Janus opted to continue his development in North America, playing major junior hockey with the Erie Otters of the Ontario Hockey League (OHL). On December 31, 2009, the Tampa Bay Lightning signed Janus to a three-year, entry-level contract.

Janus made his professional debut with the Lightning's American Hockey League (AHL) affiliate, the Norfolk Admirals, in the 2009–10 season.

Janus claimed the Calder Cup, as the backup with the Admirals in the 2011–12 season, but upon being unable to earn an NHL recall through the duration of his rookie contract with the Lightning he opted to return as a restricted free agent to his original club, HC Slovan Bratislava of the Kontinental Hockey League (KHL) on September 8, 2012.

From 2022 to 2025, he played with HC Košice, helping the team to win two Slovak Championships (2023 and 2025). In 2025, he was recognized as the best player of the play-off phase. In 2025, after his contract with Košice expired, he signed a two-year contract with his hometown team HC Prešov.

== International play ==
As a member of Team Slovakia, Janus competed at the 2009 World Junior Ice Hockey Championships where he was named to the IIHF World U20 Championship All-Star Team.

== Awards and honours ==
Award	Year
Slovak
Champion	2023, 2025
AHL
Calder Cup (Norfolk Admirals)	2012
KHL
All-Star Game	2014
International
WJC All-Star Team	2009
