= Nikita Khlystov =

Russian ice hockey player (born 1993)

- Born: July 23, 1993 (age 32) Magnitogorsk, Russia
- Height: 6 ft 2 in (188 cm)
- Weight: 181 lb (82 kg; 12 st 13 lb)
- Position: Defence
- Shoots: Left
- KHL team Former teams: Neftekhimik Nizhnekamsk; Traktor Chelyabinsk; Metallurg Novokuznetsk; HC Yugra; Kunlun Red Star; Severstal Cherepovets; Metallurg Magnitogorsk; HC 21 Prešov
- Playing career: 2013–present

Nikita Khlystov (born July 23, 1993) is a Russian professional ice hockey defenceman. He is currently playing for HC Neftekhimik Nizhnekamsk of the Kontinental Hockey League (KHL).

Khlystov made his Kontinental Hockey League debut playing with Traktor Chelyabinsk during the 2013–14 KHL season.

On May 1, 2020, Khlystov joined his sixth KHL club, Metallurg Magnitogorsk, after he was traded by Severstal Cherepovets in exchange for financial compensation.
