= Alexander Shinin =

Russian ice hockey player

- Born: January 7, 1984 (age 42) Chelyabinsk, USSR
- Height: 6 ft 0 in (183 cm)
- Weight: 190 lb (86 kg; 13 st 8 lb)
- Position: Defence
- Shoots: Left
- KHL team Former teams: Traktor Chelyabinsk; Severstal Cherepovets
- Playing career: 2001–present

Alexander Shinin (born January 7, 1984) is a Russian professional ice hockey defenceman who currently plays for Traktor Chelyabinsk in the Kontinental Hockey League (KHL). He has previously only played with HC Severstal of the KHL.
