= Sergei Sentyurin =

Russian ice hockey player

- Born: July 12, 1987 (age 37); Moscow, Russian SFSR, Soviet Union
- Height: 6 ft 4 in (193 cm)
- Weight: 231 lb (105 kg; 16 st 7 lb)
- Position: Forward
- Shoots: Right
- KHL team Former teams: Traktor Chelyabinsk; Dyanmo Moscow; Khimik Voskresensk; Avangard Omsk; Salavat Yulaev Ufa; Torpedo Nizhny Novgorod; Metallurg Novokuznetsk
- Playing career: 2005–present

Sergei Sentyurin (born July 12, 1987) is a Russian professional ice hockey player. He is currently playing with Traktor Chelyabinsk of the Kontinental Hockey League (KHL).

Sentyurin made his Kontinental Hockey League debut playing with Khimik Voskresensk during the inaugural 2008–09 KHL season.
