= Egor Milovzorov =

Russian ice hockey player

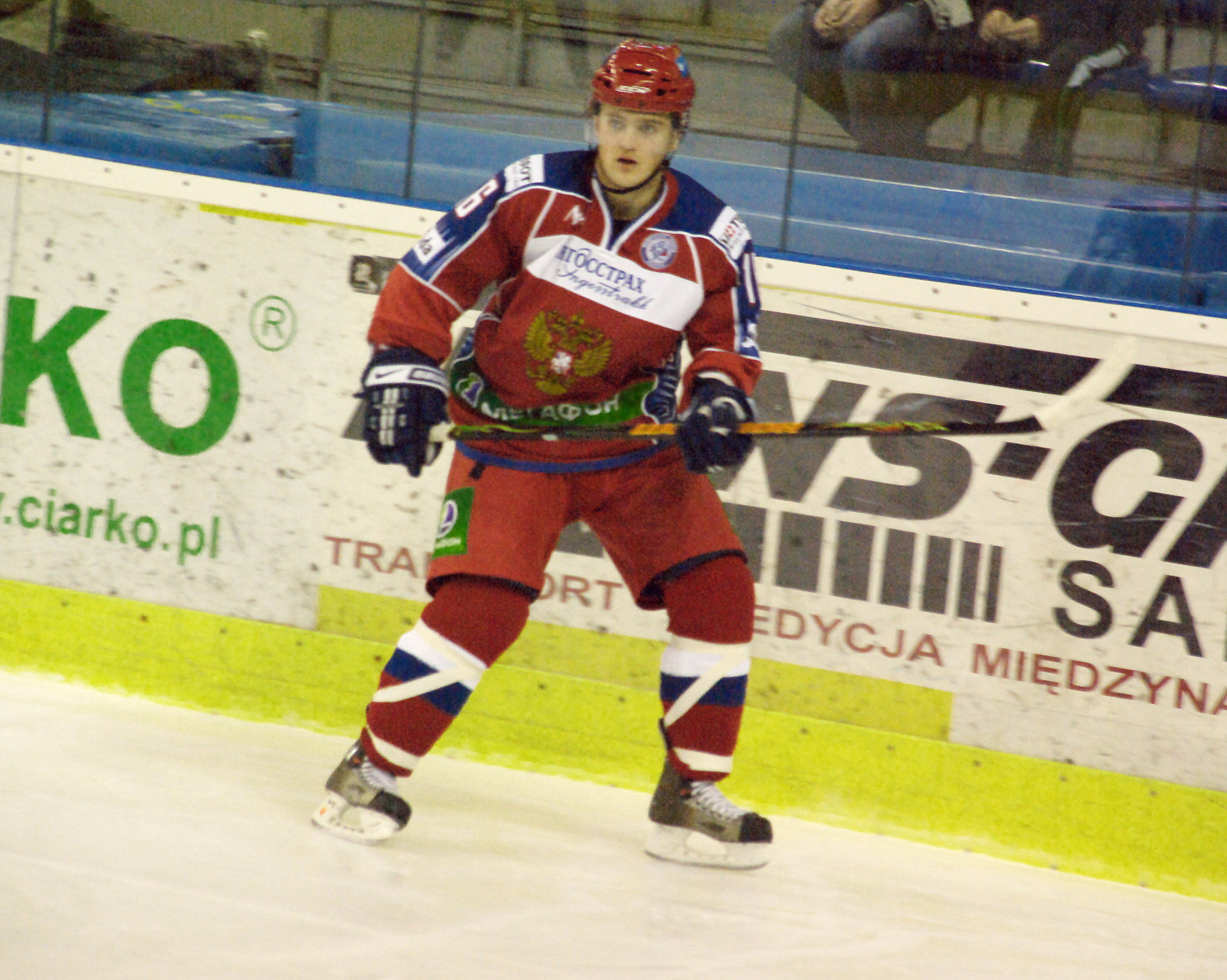
- Born: November 19, 1987 (age 37); Novosibirsk, Russian SFSR
- Height: 5 ft 10 in (178 cm)
- Weight: 180 lb (82 kg; 12 st 12 lb)
- Position: Forward
- Shoots: Left
- KHL team Former teams: Free Agent; Sibir Novosibirsk; Dynamo Moscow; Yugra Khanty-Mansiysk; Neftekhimik Nizhnekamsk; Ak Bars Kazan; Avtomobilist Yekaterinburg
- Playing career: 2005–present

Egor Milovzorov (born November 19, 1987) is a former Russian professional ice hockey forward. He most recently played for hometown club, HC Sibir Novosibirsk in the Kontinental Hockey League (KHL).

He was acquired by HC Neftekhimik Nizhnekamsk from Yugra Khanty-Mansiysk for Anton Krysanov October 24, 2011.
