= Arsen Khisamutdinov =

Russian ice hockey player

- Born: 26 February 1998 (age 28) Ufa, Russia
- Height: 6 ft 3 in (191 cm)
- Weight: 205 lb (93 kg; 14 st 9 lb)
- Position: Forward
- Shoots: Left
- KHL team Former teams: Free agent Neftekhimik Nizhnekamsk; Laval Rocket; Dinamo Riga; Avtomobilist Yekaterinburg
- NHL draft: 170th overall, 2019; Montreal Canadiens
- Playing career: 2018–present

Arsen Nagimovich Khisamutdinov (Russian: Арсен Нагимович Хисамутдинов; born 26 February 1998) is a Russian professional ice hockey forward who is currently an unrestricted free agent. He most recently played for HC Neftekhimik Nizhnekamsk of the Kontinental Hockey League (KHL). He was chosen by the Montreal Canadiens in the sixth round, 170th overall, of the 2019 NHL entry draft.

== Playing career ==
Khisamutdinov launched his professional ice hockey career in his native Russia, suiting up for HC Neftekhimik Nizhnekamsk, the top-level team in his hometown, competing in the Kontinental Hockey League (KHL). After continuing his development in Russia, Khisamutdinov leaped into North American professional hockey when, on May 1, 2020, he signed a two-year, entry-level contract with the Canadiens.

During the 2021–22 season, Khisamutdinov was sent by the Canadiens to start the year with their ECHL affiliate, the Trois-Rivières Lions. After recording 5 points in 10 games, the Canadiens placed him on unconditional waivers on December 9, 2021, to terminate his contract. Once he cleared waivers the following day, his contract was officially ended by mutual agreement.

On December 18, 2021, Khisamutdinov returned to Russia and signed a one-year agreement with Dinamo Riga, a Latvian-based team competing in the KHL. During his tenure with Dinamo Riga, Khisamutdinov saw limited action, appearing in just five games and contributing one assist.

Following the withdrawal of Dinamo Riga from the KHL as a result of the Russian invasion of Ukraine and the ensuing geopolitical tensions, Khisamutdinov sought to continue his professional career in the KHL. On May 5, 2022, he secured a one-year contract with Avtomobilist Yekaterinburg.

After a two season hiatus away from the KHL, Khisamutdinov returned to his original club, Neftekhimik Nizhnekamsk, and following a successful trial was signed to a one-year contract for the 2025–26 season on 21 August 2025.

== Career statistics ==
			Regular season					Playoffs
Season	Team	League	GP	G	A	Pts	PIM	GP	G	A	Pts	PIM
2015–16	Reaktor Nizhnekamsk	MHL	27	2	1	3	2	1	0	0	0	0
2016–17	Reaktor Nizhnekamsk	MHL	51	11	12	23	24	3	0	1	1	0
2017–18	Reaktor Nizhnekamsk	MHL	59	23	40	63	52	8	1	5	6	36
2018–19	Reaktor Nizhnekamsk	MHL	41	26	29	55	99	3	0	2	2	2
2018–19	Neftekhimik Nizhnekamsk	KHL	9	2	3	5	0	—	—	—	—	—
2019–20	Neftekhimik Nizhnekamsk	KHL	31	1	2	3	14	1	0	0	0	0
2019–20	CSK VVS Samara	VHL	14	9	4	13	2	—	—	—	—	—
2020–21	Laval Rocket	AHL	15	0	1	1	4	—	—	—	—	—
2021–22	Trois-Rivières Lions	ECHL	10	3	2	5	0	—	—	—	—	—
2021–22	Dinamo Riga	KHL	5	0	1	1	4	—	—	—	—	—
2022–23	Avtomobilist Yekaterinburg	KHL	2	0	0	0	0	—	—	—	—	—
2022–23	Gornyak-UGMK	VHL	9	0	2	2	2	—	—	—	—	—
2024–25	Humo Tashkent	KAZ	12	0	3	3	2	—	—	—	—	—
2024–25	HK Lida	BLR	8	0	0	0	2	—	—	—	—	—
2025–26	Neftekhimik Nizhnekamsk	KHL	3	0	1	1	0	—	—	—	—	—
2025–26	Izhstal Izhevsk	VHL	15	0	1	1	0	2	0	0	0	2
KHL totals			50	3	7	10	18	1	0	0	0	0

== Awards and honours ==
Award	Year
MHL
Forward of the Month (September)	2018–19
All-Star Game	2019
KHL
All-Star Game (MHL Selection)	2019
