= HC Neftekhimik Nizhnekamsk =

Ice hockey team based in Nizhnekamsk, Russia

Neftekhimik Nizhnekamsk
- City: Nizhnekamsk, Russia
- League: KHL 2008–present: RSL 1996–2008; IHL 1995–1996; Vysshaya Liga 1992–1995; Soviet League Class A3 1990–1992; Soviet League Class B 1979–1990
- Conference: Eastern
- Division: Kharlamov
- Founded: 1968
- Home arena: SCC Arena (capacity: 5,500)
- Colours
- Owner: NKNH
- Head coach: Igor Grishin
- Captain: Andrei Belozyorov
- Affiliates: Izhstal Izhevsk (VHL); Reaktor (MHL)
- Website: hcnh.ru

Franchise history
- Neftekhimik Nizhnekamsk 1968–present

HC Neftekhimik Nizhnekamsk (Russian: ХК Нефтехимик Нижнекамск) is a professional ice hockey club based in Nizhnekamsk, Russia. It is a member of the Kharlamov Division in the Kontinental Hockey League (KHL).

== History ==
Neftekhimik was founded October 23, 1968 by workers of the Nizhnekamsk Petrochemical plant to represent Nizhnekamsk in the Tatar ASSR ice hockey championship. After winning championship titles in regional competitions, the team was promoted to the national level. It reached the top division of Russian hockey in 1995.

== Honors ==
=== Champions ===
(gold) Vysshaya Liga Championship (1): 1995
(gold) Tampere Cup (1): 2002
(gold) Tatra Cup (1): 2003
(gold) Bashkortostan Cup (1): 2017

== Season-by-season KHL record ==
Note: GP = Games played; W = Wins; L = Losses; OTL = Overtime Losses; Pts = Points; GF = Goals for; GA = Goals against; P = Playoff

Season	GP	W	L	OTL	Pts	GF	GA	Finish	Top Scorer	Playoffs
2008–09	56	22	24	2	79	146	140	4th, Chernyshev	Konstantin Makarov (36 points: 16 G, 20 A; 44 GP)	Lost in preliminary round, 1–3 (Lokomotiv Yaroslavl)
2009–10	56	27	21	0	93	176	166	3rd, Kharlamov	Niklas Persson (38 points: 13 G, 25 A; 55 GP)	Lost in Conference Semifinals, 2–4 (Salavat Yulaev Ufa)
2010–11	54	22	26	2	75	159	162	4th, Kharlamov	Sergei Konkov (39 points: 18 G, 21 A; 53 GP)	Lost in Conference Quarterfinals, 3–4 (Avangard Omsk)
2011–12	54	20	25	1	74	142	165	5th, Kharlamov	Maxim Pestushko (39 points: 24 G, 15 A; 51 GP)	Did not qualify
2012–13	52	17	19	2	77	144	150	4th, Kharlamov	Renat Mamashev (42 points: 10 G, 32 A; 52 GP)	Lost in Conference Quarterfinals, 0–4 (Ak Bars Kazan)
2013–14	54	19	34	1	57	127	152	7th, Kharlamov	Yegor Milovzorov (30 points: 16 G, 14 A; 37 GP)	Did not qualify
2014–15	60	25	33	2	73	165	199	5th, Kharlamov	Dan Sexton (47 points: 19 G, 28 A; 49 GP)	Did not qualify
2015–16	60	27	29	4	86	130	135	4th, Kharlamov	Mikhail Zhukov (36 points: 16 G, 20 A; 59 GP)	Lost in Conference Quarterfinals, 0–4 (Avangard Omsk)
2016–17	60	28	31	1	80	143	155	4th, Kharlamov	Dan Sexton (50 points: 13 G, 37 A; 51 GP)	Did not qualify
2017–18	56	30	19	7	94	135	135	5th, Kharlamov	Dan Sexton (47 points: 12 G, 35 A; 52 GP)	Lost in Conference Quarterfinals, 1–4 (Traktor Chelyabinsk)
2018–19	62	23	33	6	52	130	164	6th, Kharlamov	Juuso Puustinen (37 points: 20 G, 17 A; 53 GP)	Did not qualify
2019–20	62	28	26	8	64	162	158	5th, Kharlamov	Matt White (34 points: 15 G, 19 A; 60 GP)	Lost in Conference Quarterfinals, 0–4 (Ak Bars Kazan)
2020–21	60	19	39	2	40	133	214	6th, Kharlamov	Libor Hudáček (38 points: 17 G, 21 A; 50 GP)	Did not qualify
2021–22	49	22	19	8	52	121	140	4th, Kharlamov	Marat Khairullin (32 points: 17 G, 15 A; 46 GP)	Lost in Conference Quarterfinals, 0–4 (Traktor Chelyabinsk)
2022–23	68	33	29	6	72	173	193	4th, Kharlamov	Pavel Poryadin (37 points: 22 G, 15 A; 67 GP)	Lost in Conference Quarterfinals, 2–4 (Ak Bars Kazan)
2023–24	68	27	26	15	69	158	200	6th, Kharlamov	Andrei Belozyorov (44 points: 19 G, 25 A; 68 GP)	Did not qualify
2024–25	68	25	26	17	67	159	200	5th, Kharlamov	Andrei Belozyorov (43 points: 18 G, 25 A; 68 GP)	Did not qualify
2025–26	68	34	31	3	71	170	188	5th, Kharlamov	Andrei Belozyorov (48 points: 27 G, 21 A; 62 GP)	Lost in Last 16, 1–4 (Avangard Omsk)

== Players ==
=== Current roster ===
Updated 11 April 2026.

No.	Nat	Player	Pos	S/G	Age	Acquired	Birthplace
44	(Russia)	Vladislav Barulin	RW	R	30	2025	Moscow, Russia
71	(Russia)	Andrei Belozyorov (A)	LW	R	30	2022	Chelyabinsk, Russia
18	(Russia)	Alexander Dergachyov (C)	C	L	29	2023	Langepas, Russia
53	(Russia)	Filipp Dolganov	G	L	28	2023	Izhevsk, Russia
79	(United States)	Joseph Duszak	D	R	29	2025	Franklin Square, New York, United States
65	(Russia)	Maxim Fedotov	D	R	24	2025	Saratov, Russia
11	(Russia)	Dinar Khafizullin	D	L	37	2025	Kazan, Russian SFSR, Soviet Union
29	(Russia)	Timur Khairullin	D	L	26	2024	Ufa, Russia
77	(Russia)	Arsen Khisamutdinov	RW	L	28	2025	Ufa, Russia
7	(Russia)	Nikita Khlystov (A)	D	L	33	2023	Magnitogorsk, Russia
61	(Russia)	Nikita Khoruzhev (A)	C	L	23	2024	Nizhnekamsk, Russia
16	(Russia)	Nikolai Krivolapov	LW	R	20	2025	St. Petersburg, Russia
5	(Russia)	Fyodor Kroshchinsky	D	L	24	2024	Moscow, Russia
23	(Russia)	Danila Kvartalnov	C	L	29	2025	Voskresensk, Russia
52	(Russia)	Evgeny Mityakin (A)	LW	L	28	2021	Krasnokamsk, Russia
17	(Russia)	Matvei Nadvorny	RW	L	23	2025	Segezha, Russia
72	(Russia)	Ivan Nikolishin	C	L	30	2025	Hartford, Connecticut, United States
31	(Russia)	Yaroslav Ozolin	G	L	26	2021	Nizhnekamsk, Russia
55	(Russia)	Ilya Pastukhov	D	L	25	2023	Novosibirsk, Russia
13	(Russia)	Nikita Popugayev	LW	L	28	2025	Moscow, Russia
22	(Canada)	Luka Profaca	D	R	24	2024	Mississauga, Ontario, Canada
70	(Russia)	Kondrat Reshetnikov	RW	L	19	2024	Kungur, Russia
21	(Russia)	Grigori Seleznyov	RW	L	24	2023	Tambov, Russia
24	(Russia)	Artyom Serikov	D	L	25	2023	Dmitrov, Russia
91	(Russia)	Bulat Shafigullin	RW	L	26	2017	Nizhnekamsk, Russia
33	(Russia)	German Tochilkin	RW	L	22	2023	Yuzhny, Russia
73	(Belarus)	Yegor Yuzlenko	D	L	24	2024	Gomel, Belarus
84	(Russia)	Matvei Zaseda	LW	R	27	2026	Khabarovsk, Russia
88	(Russia)	Damir Zhafyarov	LW	L	32	2025	Moscow, Russia

== Franchise leaders ==
Team logo used from 2009 to 2017.

=== All-time KHL scoring leaders ===
These are the top-ten point-scorers in franchise history. Figures are updated after each completed KHL regular season.

Note: Pos = Position; GP = Games played; G = Goals; A = Assists; Pts = Points; P/G = Points per game; = current Neftekhimik player

Points
Player	Pos	GP	G	A	Pts	P/G
(United States) Dan Sexton	RW	241	60	134	194	0.81
(Russia) Igor Polygalov	C	432	86	85	171	0.40
(Russia) Andrei Belozyorov	LW	258	81	86	167	0.64
(Russia) Egor Milovzorov	RW	247	65	100	165	0.67
(Russia) Pavel Poryadin	RW	355	76	80	156	0.44
(Russia) Evgeny Mityakin	LW	317	58	84	142	0.44
(Russia) Maxim Pestushko	RW	179	64	57	121	0.68
(Russia) Bulat Shafigullin	RW	366	48	68	116	0.31
(Russia) Marat Khairullin	RW	308	57	51	108	0.35
(Russia) Andrei Ivanov	LW	187	53	45	98	0.52

Goals
Player	Pos	G
(Russia) Igor Polygalov	C	86
(Russia) Andrei Belozyorov	LW	81
(Russia) Pavel Poryadin	RW	76
(Russia) Egor Milovzorov	RW	65
(Russia) Maxim Pestushko	RW	64
(United States) Dan Sexton	RW	60
(Russia) Evgeny Mityakin	LW	58
(Russia) Marat Khairullin	RW	57
(Russia) Andrei Ivanov	LW	53
(Russia) Bulat Shafigullin	RW	48

Assists
Player	Pos	A
(United States) Dan Sexton	RW	134
(Russia) Egor Milovzorov	RW	100
(Russia) Andrei Belozyorov	LW	86
(Russia) Igor Polygalov	C	85
(Russia) Evgeny Mityakin	LW	84
(Russia) Pavel Poryadin	RW	80
(Russia) Bulat Shafigullin	RW	68
(Russia) Renat Mamashev	D	66
(Russia) Evgeny Ryasensky	D	58
(Russia) Maxim Pestushko	RW	57
