= 2006–07 Russian Superleague season =

- League: Russian Superleague
- Sport: Ice hockey
- Duration: September 7, 2006 – April 13, 2007
- Number of teams: 19

Regular season
- Season champions: Ak Bars Kazan

Playoffs

Final
- Champions: Metallurg Magnitogorsk
- Runners-up: Ak Bars Kazan

Russian Superleague seasons
- ← 2005–06 2007–08 →

The 2006–07 Russian Superleague season was the 11th season of the Russian Superleague, the top level of ice hockey in Russia. 19 teams participated in the league, and Metallurg Magnitogorsk won the championship.

== Standings ==
	Club	GP	W	OTW	T	OTL	L	GF	GA	Pts
1.	Ak Bars Kazan	54	35	3	7	1	8	214	111	119
2.	Avangard Omsk	54	32	3	6	2	11	189	104	110
3.	Salavat Yulaev Ufa	54	30	1	12	1	10	152	108	105
4.	Metallurg Magnitogorsk	54	30	2	7	1	14	146	99	102
5.	HC Sibir Novosibirsk	54	26	3	4	2	19	149	136	90
6.	HC CSKA Moscow	54	27	1	4	2	20	153	139	89
7.	Lokomotiv Yaroslavl	54	25	2	8	1	18	153	136	88
8.	Khimik Moscow Oblast	54	26	0	5	1	22	159	130	84
9.	Severstal Cherepovets	54	24	2	4	1	23	137	139	81
10.	HC Dynamo Moscow	54	23	1	5	2	23	148	144	78
11.	HC Lada Togliatti	54	21	3	7	1	22	121	117	77
12.	Neftekhimik Nizhnekamsk	54	19	2	8	1	24	126	130	70
13.	HC MVD Podolsk	54	19	4	2	2	27	147	171	69
14.	SKA Saint Petersburg	54	18	1	7	2	26	137	158	65
15.	Vityaz Chekhov	54	17	1	4	6	26	127	147	63
16.	Metallurg Novokuznetsk	54	12	7	9	3	23	111	144	62
17.	Traktor Chelyabinsk	54	12	2	10	3	27	103	141	53
18.	Amur Khabarovsk	54	11	1	9	3	30	92	147	47
19.	PHC Krylya Sovetov Moscow	54	5	1	4	5	39	104	247	26

== Playoffs ==
1st round
1	Ak Bars Kazan	3
16	Metallurg Novokuznetsk	0
8	Khimik Moscow Oblast	3
9	Severstal Cherepovets	2
3	Salavat Yulaev Ufa	3
14	SKA Saint Petersburg	0
6	HC CSKA Moscow	3
11	Lada Togliatti	0
2	Avangard Omsk	3
15	Vityaz Chekhov	0
7	Lokomotiv Yaroslavl	3
10	HC Dynamo Moscow	0
4	Metallurg Magnitogorsk	3
13	HC MVD Podolsk	0
5	HC Sibir Novosibirsk	3
12	Neftekhimik Nizhnekamsk	1

Quarterfinals
1	Ak Bars Kazan	3
8	Khimik Moscow Oblast	1
3	Salavat Yulaev Ufa	2
6	HC CSKA Moscow	3
2	Avangard Omsk	3
7	Lokomotiv Yaroslavl	1
4	Metallurg Magnitogorsk	3
5	HC Sibir Novosibirsk	0

Semifinals
1	Ak Bars Kazan	3
6	HC CSKA Moscow	1
2	Avangard Omsk	1
4	Metallurg Magnitogorsk	3

Final
1	Ak Bars Kazan	2
4	Metallurg Magnitogorsk	3
