= 2007–08 Russian Superleague season =

- League: Russian Superleague
- Sport: Ice hockey
- Duration: September 4, 2007 – April 11, 2008
- Teams: 20

Regular season
- Season champions: Salavat Yulaev Ufa

Playoffs

Final
- Champions: Salavat Yulaev Ufa
- Runners-up: Lokomotiv Yaroslavl

Russian Superleague seasons
- 2006–07 2008–09

The 2007–08 Russian Superleague season was the 12th and last season of the Russian Superleague, the top level of ice hockey in Russia. It was replaced by the Kontinental Hockey League for 2008-09. 20 teams participated in the league, and Salavat Yulaev Ufa won the championship.

== Standings ==
R		GP	W	OTW	SOW	SOL	OTL	L	GF	GA	Pts
1	Salavat Yulaev Ufa	57	37	2	3	1	3	11	183	119	125
2	Metallurg Magnitogorsk	57	31	4	4	3	3	12	175	113	115
3	CSKA Moscow	57	30	4	2	3	3	15	190	139	108
4	Khimik Moscow Oblast	57	29	3	4	2	2	17	189	135	105
5	Lokomotiv Yaroslavl	57	29	2	3	4	0	19	167	148	101
6	SKA Saint Petersburg	57	29	1	4	2	1	20	143	130	100
7	Ak Bars Kazan	57	28	3	2	0	5	19	182	142	99
8	Avangard Omsk	57	24	5	2	3	1	22	172	154	90
9	Dynamo Moscow	57	19	2	6	3	6	21	138	148	82
10	HC MVD Moscow Oblast	57	20	1	7	2	3	24	148	155	81
11	Spartak Moscow	57	21	1	2	2	7	24	129	151	78
12	Lada Togliatti	57	21	1	3	4	2	26	140	156	77
13	Severstal Cherepovets	57	18	4	4	4	3	24	148	158	77
14	Traktor Chelyabinsk	57	20	2	3	2	4	26	162	186	76
15	Neftekhimik Nizhnekamsk	57	16	1	7	1	7	25	125	144	72
16	Amur Khabarovsk	57	17	3	4	2	4	27	122	160	71
8.5
17	Metallurg Novokuznetsk	57	16	6	1	5	2	27	131	174	69
18	Vityaz Chekhov	57	16	2	4	0	7	28	151	181	67
19	Sibir Novosibirsk	57	17	0	1	5	4	30	121	182	62
20	Torpedo Nizhny Novgorod	57	13	2	4	2	2	34	125	166	55

== Playoffs ==
Round of 16
1	Salavat Yulaev Ufa	3
16	Amur Khabarovsk	1
4	Khimik Moscow Oblast	2
13	Severstal Cherepovets	3
3	CSKA Moscow	3
14	Traktor Chelyabinsk	0
7	Ak Bars Kazan	3
10	HC MVD Moscow Oblast	0
2	Metallurg Magnitogorsk	3
15	Neftekhimik Nizhnekamsk	2
8	Avangard Omsk	1
9	Dynamo Moscow	3
5	Lokomotiv Yaroslavl	3
12	Lada Togliatti	1
6	SKA Saint Petersburg	3
11	Spartak Moscow	2

Quarterfinals
1	Salavat Yulaev Ufa	3
13	Severstal Cherepovets	0
3	CSKA Moscow	0
7	Ak Bars Kazan	3
2	Metallurg Magnitogorsk	3
9	Dynamo Moscow	2
5	Lokomotiv Yaroslavl	3
6	SKA Saint Petersburg	1

Semifinals
1	Salavat Yulaev Ufa	3
7	Ak Bars Kazan	1
2	Metallurg Magnitogorsk	0
5	Lokomotiv Yaroslavl	3

Final
1	Salavat Yulaev Ufa	3
5	Lokomotiv Yaroslavl	2
