= List of people from Moscow =

Coat of arms of Moscow

This is a list of notable people who were born or have lived in Moscow, Russia (or Soviet Union 1922–1991).

== Born in Moscow ==
=== 13th–17th century ===
==== 1201–1700 ====
- Ivan I of Moscow (1288–1341), Prince of Moscow from 1325; and Grand Prince of Vladimir from 1328
- Vasily I of Moscow (1371–1425), Grand Prince of Moscow (1389–1425)
- Vasily II of Moscow (1415–1462), Grand Prince of Moscow whose long reign (1425–1462) was plagued by the greatest civil war of Old Russian history
- Ivan III of Russia (1440–1505), Grand Prince of Moscow and Grand Prince of all Russia (1462–1505).
- Basil Fool for Christ (1468–1552), Russian Orthodox saint
- Helena of Moscow (1476–1513), daughter of Ivan III the Great, Grand Prince of Moscow, and an uncrowned Grand Duchess of Lithuania and Queen of Poland as she would not convert from Eastern Orthodoxy to Catholicism
- Vasili III of Russia (1479–1533), Grand Prince of Moscow (1505–1533)
- Vasili IV of Russia (ca.1552–1612), tsar of Russia, 1606 and 1610
- Patriarch Filaret of Moscow (1553–1633), boyar and patriarch of Moscow
- Feodor I of Russia (1557–1598), last Rurikid tsar of Russia (1584–1598)
- Feodor II of Russia (1589–1605), tsar of Russia (1605)
- Alexis of Russia (1629–1676), tsar of Russia (1645–1676)
- Boris Sheremetev (1652–1719), diplomat and general field marshal during the Great Northern War
- Sofia Alekseyevna of Russia (1657–1704), regent of Russia (1682–1689)
- Feodor III of Russia (1661–1682), tsar of all Russia (1676–1682)
- Ivan V of Russia (1666–1696), tsar of all Russia (1682–1696)
- Eudoxia Lopukhina (1669–1731), first wife of Peter I of Russia
- Peter the Great (1672–1725), tsar of All Russia (1682–1725), emperor of All Russia (1721–1725)
- Mikhail Golitsyn (1675–1730), field marshal
- Tsarevna Catherine Ivanovna of Russia (1691–1733), Duchess of Mecklenburg-Schwerin, daughter of Tsar Ivan V, eldest sister of Empress Anna of Russia
- Laurentius Blumentrost (1692–1755), personal physician to the tsar, founder and first president of the Saint Petersburg Academy of Sciences
- Alexey Bestuzhev-Ryumin (1693–1766), diplomat and chancellor
- Anna of Russia (1693–1740), Empress of Russia (1730–1740)

=== 18th century ===
==== 1701–1800 ====
- Grand Duchess Anna Petrovna of Russia (1708–1728), Duchess of Schleswig-Holstein-Gottorp
- Elizabeth of Russia (1709–1762), Empress of Russia (1741–1762)
- Alexander Sumarokov (1717–1777), poet and playwright
- Alexander Suvorov (1730–1800), Count of Rymnik, Prince of Italy, Count of the Holy Roman Empire, national hero of Russia, generalissimo of the Russian Empire
- Denis Fonvizin (1745–1792), playwright of the Russian Enlightenment
- Alexander Kurakin (1752–1818), statesman and diplomat
- Grigory Ugryumov (1764–1823), portrait and history painter in the Classical style
- Andrey Melensky (1766–1833), Neoclassical architect
- Johann Friedrich Adam (1780–1838), botanist
- Alexey Venetsianov (1780–1847), painter
- Sophie Swetchine (1782–1857), mystic (with a salon in Paris)
- Sergey Uvarov (1786–1855), classical scholar, an influential imperial statesman under Nicholas I of Russia
- Pyotr Vyazemsky (1792–1878), leading personality of the Golden Age of Russian poetry
- Alexander Griboyedov (1795–1829), diplomat, playwright, poet, and composer
- Anton Delvig (1798–1831), poet and journalist
- Alexander Pushkin (1799–1837), poet and the founder of modern Russian literature

=== 19th century ===
==== 1801–1850 ====
- Aleksey Khomyakov (1804–1860), theologian, philosopher and poet
- Dmitry Venevitinov (1805–1827), Romantic poet
- Alexandre Dubuque (1812–1898), pianist, composer and teacher
- Alexander Herzen (1812–1870), writer and thinker
- Evdokiya Rostopchina (1812–1858), one of the early Russian women poets
- Pavel Annenkov (1813–1887), literary critic and memoirist
- Ivan Gagarin (1814–1882), Jesuit
- Mikhail Lermontov (1814–1841), Romantic writer, poet and painter
- Mikhail Katkov (1818–1887), influential and conservative journalist
- La Païva (1819–1884), French courtesan
- Mikhail Dostoevsky (1820–1864), short-story writer, publisher, literary critic and the elder brother of Fyodor Dostoevsky
- Fyodor Dostoevsky (1821–1881), novelist, short-story writer, essayist, journalist and philosopher
- Arthur von Mohrenheim (1824–1906), diplomat
- Konstantin Pobedonostsev (1827–1907), jurist, statesman, and adviser to three tsars
- Alexei Savrasov (1830–1897), landscape painter
- Pavel Tretyakov (1832–1898), businessman, patron of art, collector, and philanthropist
- Andrei Famintsyn (1835–1918), botanist, public figure, and academician of the Petersburg Academy of Sciences
- Vasili Zinger (1836–1907), mathematician, botanist and philosopher
- Konstantin Makovsky (1839–1915), painter
- Wilhelm Junker (1840–1892), explorer of Africa
- Peter Kropotkin (1842–1921), geographer, non-fiction writer, revolutionary and philosopher
- Alexander Urusov (1843–1900), lawyer, literary critic, translator and philanthropist
- Mikhail Skobelev (1843–1882), heroic Russian general, conquered Central Asia
- Olga Fedchenko (1845–1921), botanist
- Vladimir Makovsky (1846–1920), painter, art collector and teacher
- Vsevolod Miller (1848–1913), philologist, folklorist, linguist, anthropologist and archaeologist
- Sofya Kovalevskaya (1850–1891), mathematician

==== 1851–1900 ====
- Rosa Kerschbaumer-Putjata (1851–1923), ophthalmologist: Austria's first female doctor
- Lev Lopatin (1855–1920), philosopher
- Caran d'Ache (1858–1909), French satirist and political cartoonist
- Sergey Malyutin (1859–1937), painter, architect and stage designer
- Aleksandr Golovin (1863–1930), artist and stage designer
- Vyacheslav Ivanov (1866–1949), poet, philosopher, translator, and literary critic
- Wassily Kandinsky (1866–1944), painter and art theorist
- Nikolai Kischner (1867–1935), chemist
- Hans Pfitzner (1869–1949), German composer and self-described anti-modernist
- Alexander Scriabin (1872–1915), composer and virtuoso pianist
- Mikhail Bonch-Bruyevich (1870–1956), Imperial Russian and Soviet military commander, lieutenant general
- Catherine Bartho (1873–?), ballerina
- Vladimir Bonch-Bruyevich (1873–1955), politician, historian, writer and Old Bolshevik
- Ivan Shmelyov (1873–1950), writer
- Semyon Frank (1877–1950), philosopher
- Alexander Goedicke (1877–1957), composer and pianist
- P. D. Ouspensky (1878–1947), mathematician and esotericist
- Sofia Fedorova (1879–1963), ballerina
- Aleksei Goncharov (1879–1913), chess master
- Andrei Bely (1880–1934), novelist, poet, theorist, and literary critic
- Emanuel Goldberg (1881–1970), Israeli physicist and inventor
- Anna Abrikosova (1882–1936), prominent figure in the Russian Catholic Church
- Pavel Filonov (1883–1941), avant-garde painter, art theorist and poet
- Lev Kamenev (1883–1936), Bolshevik revolutionary; prominent Soviet politician
- Yosef Sprinzak (1885–1959), Israeli politician, Zionist and the first Speaker of the Knesset
- Robert Falk (1886–1958), painter
- Vladimir Favorsky (1886–1964), graphic artist, woodcut illustrator, painter, muralist and teacher
- Nikolai Vavilov (1887–1943), botanist and geneticist
- Sonja Schlesin (1888–1956), Gandhi's secretary in South Africa
- Joseph N. Ermolieff (1889–1962), film producer
- Alexis Granowsky (1890–1937), theatre director
- Boris Pasternak (1890–1960), poet, novelist, and literary translator (laureate, Nobel Prize for Literature in 1958)
- Robert Spiess (1891–1982), German tennis player
- Sergey Vavilov (1891–1951), physicist
- Marina Tsvetaeva (1892–1941), poet
- Konstantin Zel'in (1892–1983), historian
- Sergei Efron (1893–1941), poet, officer of the White Army; husband of poet Marina Tsvetaeva
- Vladimir Engelgardt (1894–1984), biochemist
- Arcady Boytler (1895–1965), producer, screenwriter and director
- Nikolai Grigoriev (1895–1938), chess player; composer of endgame studies
- Léonide Massine (1896–1979), choreographer and ballet dancer
- George Sachs (1896–1960), Russian-born German and American metallurgist
- Sophrony (Sakharov) (1896–1993), monk, theologian and writer
- Viktor Lazarev (1897–1976), art critic and historian
- Lazar Berenzon (1898–1956), military commander
- M. Ageyev (1898–1973), novelist
- Leonid Leonov (1899–1994), novelist and playwright
- Georg Witt (1899–1973), Russian-born German film producer
- Mikhail Zharov (1899–1981), actor
- Nikolai Nekrasov (1900–1938), Esperanto writer, translator and critic

=== 20th century ===
==== 1901–1910 ====
- Vladimir Lugovskoy (1901–1957), constructivist poet
- Sergey Obraztsov (1901–1992), puppeteer
- Vladimir Fogel (1902–1929), silent-film actor
- Yevgenia Ginzburg (1904–1977), educator, memoirist, imprisoned dissident
- Vera Menchik (1906–1944), British-Russian chess player; the first Women's World Chess Championship
- Olga Menchik (1907–1944), Czech-British chess master
- Lev Oborin (1907–1974), pianist
- Alexander Golitzen (1908–2005), production designer
- Boris Leven (1908–1986), Russian-born Academy Award–winning art director and production designer
- Georgy Gause (1910–1986), biologist
- Evgeny Golubev (1910–1988), composer
- Vladimir Shcherbakov (1909–1985), Soviet scientist and politician

==== 1911–1920 ====
- Gavriil Kachalin (1911–1995), football player and coach
- Alexey Lyapunov (1911–1973), mathematician and an early pioneer of computer science
- George Costakis (1913–1990), collector of Russian art
- Boris Carmi (1914–2002), Russian-born Israeli photographer
- Aleksander Gieysztor (1916–1999), Polish medievalist historian
- Vitaly Ginzburg (1916–2009), theoretical physicist, astrophysicist; Nobel laureate in physics
- Jørgen Hviid (1916–2001), Danish and Latvian sportsman and naval officer
- Urie Bronfenbrenner (1917–2005), Russian-born American developmental psychologist
- Leonid Hurwicz (1917–2008), Polish-American economist and mathematician
- Tatiana Riabouchinska (1917–2000), Russian-American prima ballerina and teacher
- George Zoritch (1917–2009), dancer

==== 1921–1930 ====
- Spartak Belyaev (1923–2017), theoretical physicist
- Aryeh Eliav (1921–2010), Israeli politician
- Andrei Sakharov (1921–1989), nuclear physicist, Soviet dissident and human-rights activist
- Kim Yaroshevskaya (1923–2025), Russian-born Canadian film, stage, and television actress
- Lidiya Alekseyeva (1924–2014), basketball coach
- Maya Plisetskaya (1925–2015), ballet dancer, choreographer, ballet director, and actress
- Yevgeny Lyadin (1926–2011), football manager and player
- Boris Uspensky (1927–2005), poster and graphics painter
- Gurgen Askaryan (1928–1997), Armenian physicist
- Vladimir Sokolov (1928–1998), zoologist, ecologist
- Sergei K. Godunov (1929–2023), mathematician
- Lev Gor'kov (1929–2016), Russian-American research physicist
- Nikolai Karpov (1929–2013), ice-hockey player
- Lyudmila Zykina (1929–2009), national folk singer of Russia
- Lev Yashin (1929–1990), football goalkeeper
- Viktor Frayonov (1930–2002), music theorist and teacher
- Lev Kuznetsov (1930–2015), fencer
- Oleg Popov (1930–2016), Soviet and Russian clown and circus artist

==== 1931–1940 ====
- Lev Durov (1931–2015), theatre and film actor; a People's Artist of the USSR
- Nikolay Kamenskiy (1931–2017), Soviet ski jumper
- Alfred Kuchevsky (1931–2000), professional ice-hockey player
- Mark Midler (1931–2012), Olympic champion foil fencer
- Viktor Tsaryov (1931–2017), footballer
- Alla Gerber (born 1932), politician, journalist and film critic
- Yuri Izyumov (1932–2021), journalist and politician
- Yevgeni Urbansky (1932–1965), actor
- Yuri Druzhnikov (1933–2008), actor, photographer, editor, journalist and travel correspondent
- Nikolai Fadeyechev (1933–2020), dancer, People's Artist of the USSR
- Yelena Gorchakova (1933–2002), javelin thrower
- Stanislav Lyubshin (born 1933), actor and film director
- Boris Batanov (1934–2004), football player
- Georgy Garanian (1934–2010), jazz saxophone player, bandleader and composer
- Yuri Korolev (born 1934), ice-hockey administrator, coach and civil servant
- Yuri Ovchinnikov (1934–1988), bioorganic chemist
- Victor Brailovsky (born 1935), computer scientist, aliyah activist, former Israeli politician
- Anatoliy Sass (1935–2023), rower
- Philaret (Vakhromeyev) (1935–2021), emeritus Metropolitan of Minsk and Slutsk, the Patriarchal Exarch of All Belarus
- Leonid Yengibarov (1935–1972), clown and actor
- Oleg Fedoseyev (1936–2001), athlete
- Alexander Ginzburg (1936–2002), journalist, poet, human-rights activist and dissident
- Natalya Gorbanevskaya (1936–2013), poet, translator of Polish literature and civil-rights activist
- Yuri Popov (1936–2016), paleoentomologist
- Bella Akhmadulina (1937–2010), poet
- Yuri Falin (1937–2003), Soviet football player
- Yevgeny Feofanov (1937–2000), boxer
- Simon Gindikin (born 1937), mathematician at Rutgers University
- Bruno Mahlow (1937–2023), German politician (SED/PDS/Die Linke) and former East German diplomat
- Umyar Mavlikhanov (1937–1999), fencer
- Aleksandr Medakin (1937–1993), football player
- Alexey Obukhov (1937–2022), diplomat and political writer
- Boris Zaytsev (1937–2000), ice-hockey player
- Valery Chalidze (1938–2018), Georgian-American writer and publisher
- Galina Gorokhova (born 1938), fencer; five-time Olympic medalist, nine-time world gold medalist
- Boris Mayorov (born 1938), ice-hockey player
- Yevgeni Mayorov (1938–1997), ice-hockey player
- Mark Rakita (born 1938), two-time Olympic champion saber fencer
- Vladimir Vysotsky (1938–1980), singer-songwriter, poet, and actor
- Yury Glazkov (1939–2008), cosmonaut, major general in the Russian Air Force
- Viktor Shustikov (1939–2025), footballer
- Elena Tchaikovskaia (born 1939), figure-skating coach and choreographer
- Gennadi Volnov (1939–2008), basketball player
- Kirill Zamarayev (1939–1996), chemist
- Igor Ryomin (1940–1991), Soviet football player
- Alexei Fridman (1940–2010), Soviet physicist
- Vyacheslav Ionov (1940–2012), sprint canoer

==== 1941–1950 ====
- Anatoli Firsov (1941–2000), ice-hockey player
- Yevgeny Frolov (born 1941), boxer
- Gennady Logofet (1942–2011), footballer and football coach
- Vladimir Fedotov (1943–2009), football striker and manager
- Valentina Kamenyok-Vinogradova (1943–2002), volleyball player
- Aleksandr Filippenko (born 1944), actor
- Alexander Kovarski (born 1944), physical chemist and professor
- Viktor Logunov (1944–2022), racing cyclist
- Viktor Luferov (1945–2010), singer-songwriter, multi-instrumentalist, poet
- Vladimir Shcherbakov (1945–1993), footballer
- Victoria Fyodorova (1946–2012), Russian-American actress and writer
- Aleksandr Gorshkov (1946–2022), ice dancer; 1976 Olympic champion
- Zoja Rudnova (1946–2014), table-tennis player
- Alexander Varshavsky (born 1946), Russian-American biochemist
- Josef Zieleniec (born 1946), Czech politician (1st Minister of Foreign Affairs of the Czech Republic)
- Tasoltan Tazretovich Basiev (1947–2012), scientist in the field of photonics
- Elena Fatalibekova (born 1947), chess Woman Grandmaster and the 2000, 2001 and 2004 Senior Women's World Chess Champion
- Karen Grigorian (1947–1989), chess master
- Boris Kerner (born 1947), German pioneer of three-phase traffic theory
- Askold Khovanskii (born 1947), Russian-Canadian mathematician
- Yuri Ushakov (born 1947), career diplomat
- Valentin Kuklev (born 1948), writer and researcher of semantics
- Tatjana Lematschko (1948–2020), Russian-Swiss chess player
- Natalya Lebedeva (born 1949), athlete
- Aleksandr Lukyanov (born 1949), rower
- Alla Pugacheva (born 1949), musical performer
- Natalya Sokolova (born 1949), athlete
- Sabir Gusein-Zade (born 1950), mathematician
- Sergey Lavrov (born 1950), diplomat (Foreign Minister of Russia)
- Sergey Musaelyan (born 1950), pianist
- Tatyana Ovechkina (born 1950), basketball player

==== 1951–1960 ====
- Vyacheslav Chanov (born 1951), football goalkeeper and coach
- Ivan Cherednik (born 1951), mathematician
- Aleksandr Laveykin (born 1951), cosmonaut
- Pyotr Mamonov (1951–2021), rock musician, songwriter and actor
- Vitaly Churkin (1952–2017), diplomat
- Arcadi Gaydamak (born 1952), Russian-born Israeli business magnate, investor and philanthropist
- Mikhail Kuznetsov (born 1952), rower
- Andrey Zubov (born 1952), historian and political scientist
- Alexander Barkashov (born 1953), political leader on the far-right
- Valery Gergiev (born 1953), conductor and opera-company director
- Kirill Gevorgian (born 1953), diplomat and jurist
- Sergey Makarichev (born 1953), chess player
- Sergey Yastrzhembsky (born 1953), politician and diplomat
- Alexei Kornienko (born 1954), Russian-born Austrian conductor and pianist
- Andrei Minenkov (born 1954), ice dancer
- Sergei O. Prokofieff (1954–2014), anthroposophist
- Andrei Gavrilov (born 1955), pianist
- Irina Moiseeva (born 1955), ice dancer
- Alex Nepomniaschy (born 1955), Russian-American cinematographer
- Sergei Petrenko (born 1955), professional football coach and former player
- Alexey Pajitnov (born 1955), video-game designer
- Igor Chetvertkov (born 1956), painter, draftsman, and theater designer
- Kirill Eskov (born 1956), writer, biologist and paleontologist
- Yuri Felshtinsky (born 1956), Russian-American historian
- Yegor Gaidar (1956–2009), economist, politician and writer
- Oleg Nagornov (born 1956), physicist and mathematician
- Alexey Ulyukaev (born 1956), politician, scientist, and economist
- Victor Vassiliev (born 1956), mathematician
- Nina Belyaeva (born 1957), public-policy researcher
- Olga Buryakina (born 1958), basketball player
- Viacheslav Fetisov (born 1958), professional ice-hockey defenseman
- Boris Fyodorov (1958–2008), economist, politician and reformer
- Nadezhda Ovechkina (born 1958), field-hockey player and Olympic medalist
- Yuriy Pimenov (born 1958), rower
- Vladimir Zubkov (born 1958), ice-hockey player
- Irina Vdovets (born 1958 or 1959), rhythmic gymnastics coach
- Tom Cain (born 1959), English journalist and novelist
- Fyodor Cherenkov (1959–2014), football midfielder
- Sergey Golovkin (1959–1996), serial killer
- Simon Nabatov (born 1959), jazz pianist
- Paul Goldberg (born 1959), novelist
- Vladimir Yakovlev (born 1959), journalist
- Marina Kosheveya (born 960), swimmer and Olympic champion
- Vladimir Pivtsov (born 1960), former professional footballer
- Sergei Ponomarenko (born 1960), ice dancer

==== 1961–1970 ====
- Oleg Bozhev (born 1961), speed skater
- Igor Glek (born 1961), chess Grandmaster, coach, theorist, writer and organiser
- Igor Moukhin (born 1961), photographer
- Igor Rivin (botn 1961), Russian-Canadian mathematician
- Aleksandr Dugin (born 1962), political scientist
- Olga Golodets (born 1962), economist and the deputy prime minister for social affairs of the Russian Federation
- Eduardo del Llano (born 1962), Cuban writer, university professor, film director, producer and screenwriter
- Gary Tabach (born 1962), retired United States Navy captain, first Soviet-born citizen to be commissioned an officer in the Armed Forces of the United States
- Elena Denisova (born 1963), Austrian violinist and festival director
- Alexey Orlovski (born 1963), painter and illustrator
- Maria Mazina (born 1964), Olympic champion épée fencer
- Sergey Zagraevsky (born 1964), painter, architectural historian, memoirist, and theologian
- Igor Jijikine (born 1965), actor
- Aleksandr Oleinikov (born 1965), film director and producer
- Igor Presnyakov (born 1965), guitarist
- Igor Khoroshev (born 1965), keyboardist; member of Yes (1998–2000)
- Inna Zhelannaya (born 1965), singer-songwriter
- Nikolai Zykov (born 1965), actor, director, artist, designer, puppet-maker, master puppeteer
- Hilarion (Alfeyev) (born 1966), bishop of the Russian Orthodox Church, Metropolitan of Volokolamsk
- Natalya Kaspersky (born 1966), Russian IT entrepreneur; president of the 'InfoWatch' Group of companies, and co-founder and ex-chief executive officer of antivirus security software company 'Kaspersky Lab'
- Olga Kryuchkova (born 1966), historical and mystical writer
- Maxim Udalov (born 1966), drummer of the Russian heavy-metal band Aria
- Fedor Bondarchuk (born 1967), film director, actor, television and film producer, clipmaker
- Masha Gessen (born 1967), journalist
- Andrey Chernyshov (born 1968), association-football manager and former player
- Rubén Gallego (born 1968), writer
- Yelena Grishina (born 1968), Olympic fencer
- Platon Obukhov (born 1968), journalist, novelist, translator and painter
- Leonid Slutsky (born 1968), politician
- Sergei Fyodorov (born 1969), icon painter
- Stas Misezhnikov (born 1969), Israeli politician
- Yaroslav Ognev (born 1969), Internet personality; co-founder and the first editor-in-chief of inoSMI
- Elena Timina (born 1969), Russian-born Dutch professional table-tennis player
- Anya Verkhovskaya (born circa 1969), film producer and activist
- Sergei Filin (born 1970), ballet dancer; ballet director of the Bolshoi Theater
- Alexander F. Gavrilov (born 1970), literary critic and editor
- Igor Girkin (born 1970), FSB Colonel
- Sergei Ovchinnikov (born 1970), manager and former association-football goalkeeper
- Oleg Ovsyannikov (born 1970), ice dancer
- Kirill Preobrazhenskiy (born 1970), artist
- Dmitry Ulyanov (born 1970), professional footballer
- Genndy Tartakovsky (born 1970), Russian-American animator

==== 1971–1980 ====
- Vladimir Fedorov (born 1971), ice dancer
- Kirill Gerasimov (born 1971), professional poker player
- Alexander Geringas (born 1971), record producer, songwriter and composer
- Ekaterina Gordeeva (born 1971), figure skater
- Vitaly Lunkin (born 1971), professional poker player
- Sergei Kishchenko (born 1972), former professional footballer
- Sergei Krestov (born 1972), former professional footballer
- Nikolai Lugansky (born 1972), pianist
- Sergey Brin (born 1973), computer scientist and internet entrepreneur; co-founded Google
- Ivan Farmakovsky (born 1973), jazz pianist, composer and arranger
- Natalya Gorelova (born 1973), middle-distance runner
- Anjelika Krylova (born 1973), ice dancer
- Aleksei Shiyanov (born 1973), professional football official, former player
- Anya Ulinich (born 1973), Russian-American novelist, graphic novelist, and short-story writer
- Alexander Braverman (born 1974), Israeli mathematician
- Jeanna Friske (1974–2015), film actress, singer and socialite
- Sergey Ryazansky (born 1974), cosmonaut
- Sergey Sharikov (1974–2015), two-time Olympic champion saber fencer
- Marina Yakusheva (born 1974), badminton player
- Aleksey Glushkov (born 1975), wrestler and Olympic bronze medalist in Greco-Roman wrestling
- Konstantin Golovskoy (born 1975), footballer
- Olga Kern (born 1975), classical pianist
- Ilya Ponomarev (born 1975), politician; member of the State Duma; technology entrepreneur
- Andrei Soldatov (born 1975), investigative journalist and security-services expert
- Andrei Solomatin (born 1975), football manager, former player
- Natalia O'Shea (born 1976), harpist, singer-songwriter and linguist
- Greg Kasavin (born 1977), former site director and executive editor at the gaming website GameSpot
- Alex Miller (born 1977), Israeli politician
- Anna Pletnyova (born 1977), singer, composer and songwriter
- Nikolai Epplée (born 1977), philologist, translator and writer
- Olga Brusnikina (born 1978), competitor in synchronized swimming and three-time Olympic champion
- Evgenia Kulikovskaya (born 1978), professional tennis player
- Pavel Trakhanov (1978–2011), professional ice-hockey defenceman
- Olga Zaitseva (born 1978), biathlete
- Alexander Fomichev (born 1979), professional ice-hockey goaltender
- Dmitry Glukhovsky (born 1979), novelist and journalist
- Ekaterina Gubanova (born 1979), operatic mezzo-soprano
- Simon Kozhin (born 1979), artist
- Svetlana Lunkina (born 1979), ballerina
- Kirill Terentyev (born 1979), footballer
- Svetlana Feofanova (born 1980), pole vaulter
- Aleksey Lukyanuk (born 1980), rally driver
- Vitali Lykhin (born 1980), footballer
- Andrei Sidelnikov (born 1980), Russian-born Kazakh professional footballer
- Regina Spektor (born 1980), Russian-born American singer-songwriter and pianist

==== 1981–1990 ====
===== 1981 =====
- Vasily Filippov (born 1981), handball player
- Sergio Galoyan (botn 1981), songwriter, producer and DJ
- Elvira Khasyanova (born 1981), synchronised swimmer
- Dasha Zhukova (born 1981), businesswoman, art collector and magazine editor

===== 1982 =====
- Tamilla Abassova (born 1982), racing cyclist
- Tatiana Antoshina (born 1982), road bicycle racer
- Aleksei Berezutski (born 1982), association footballer
- Maksim Fokin (born 1982), former professional footballer
- Alexander Frolov (born 1982), professional ice-hockey player
- Pyotr Fyodorov (born 1982), actor
- Yelena Ovchinnikova (born 1982), competitor in synchronized swimming
- Aleksei Prokudin (born 1982), former professional football player

===== 1983 =====
- Igor Andreev (born 1983), professional tennis player
- Evgeny Artyukhin (born 1983), professional ice-hockey right winger
- Yuliya Golubchikova (born 1983), pole vaulter
- Vladislav Kozhemyakin (born 1983), former professional footballer
- Sergey Lazarev (born 1983), singer
- Sergei Pereshivalov (born 1983), former professional footballer
- Mikhail Rozhkov (born 1983), football player

===== 1984 =====
- Valeriya Gai Germanika (born 1984), film director
- Boris Giltburg (born 1984), Israeli classical pianist
- Alexander Grachev (born 1984), ice dancer
- Marina Karpunina (born 1984), basketball player
- Lena Katina (born 1984), singer-songwriter; former t.A.T.u. member
- Evgeny Lapenkov (born 1984), professional ice-hockey winger
- Kristina Oblasova (born 1984), figure skater
- Elena Romanovskaya (born 1984), ice dancer

===== 1985 =====
- Sergey Borisov (born 1985), professional ice-hockey goaltender
- Aleksey Cheremisinov (born 1985), fencer; 2012 European champion and 2014 World champion
- Gleb Galperin (born 1985), diver
- Alisa Ganieva (born 1985), writer
- Alexander Ovechkin (born 1985), professional ice-hockey winger
- Mikhail Rekudanov (born 1985), former professional football player
- Julia Volkova (born 1985), singer; former member of t.A.T.u.

===== 1986 =====
- Valeria Bystritskaia (born 1986), German beauty queen, model and actress
- Boris Grachev (born 1986), chess Grandmaster
- Yury Kharchenko (born 1986), Russian-German artist
- Darya Kustova (born 1986), professional Belarusian tennis player
- Evgenia Linetskaya (born 1986), Russian-born Israeli tennis player
- Kirill Lyamin (born 1986), professional ice-hockey player
- Mikhail Magerovski (born 1986), figure skater
- Kirill Nababkin (born 1986), football player
- Mariya Ocher (born 1986), singer-songwriter, poet, director and visual artist
- Maksim Sidorov (born 1986), shot putter
- Gennady Stolyarov (born 1986), professional ice-hockey right winger
- Nina Vislova (born 1986), badminton player

===== 1987 =====
- Evgeny Busygin (born 1987), professional ice-hockey player
- Anna Chipovskaya (born 1987), actress
- Andrei Grankin (born 1987), professional ice-hockey player
- Shmuel Kozokin (born 1987), Israeli footballer
- Igor Makarov (born 1987), professional ice-hockey player
- Igor Musatov (born 1987), professional ice-hockey winger
- Olga Naidenova (born 1987), figure skater
- Olga Puchkova (born 1987), professional tennis player and model
- Alexander Uspenski (born 1987), figure skater
- Polina Gagarina (born 1987), singer

===== 1988 =====
- Artem Dzyuba (born 1988), footballer
- Marat Fakhrutdinov (born 1988), professional ice-hockey forward
- Aleksandra Fedoriva (born 1988), track-and-field athlete
- Ekaterina Galkina (born 1988), curler
- Tatiana Golovin (born 1988), Russian-born French professional tennis player
- Ilya Kablukov (born 1988), professional ice-hockey player
- Ekaterina Makarova (born 1988), professional tennis player
- Pavel Mamayev (born 1988), footballer
- Diana Yakovleva (born 1988), foil fencer
- Ruslan Yarkhamov (born 1988), former professional footballer

===== 1989 =====
- Nick Afanasiev (born 1989), Russian-born American actor
- Anastasia Baranova (born 1989), Russian-American actress
- Eve Harlow (born 1989), Russian-born Canadian actress
- Evgeny Kovalev (born 1989), professional cyclist
- Nastia Liukin (born 1989), Russian-American artistic gymnast
- Diana Markosian (born 1989), American and Russian documentary photographer, writer, and filmmaker
- Evgeniya Rodina (born 1989), professional tennis player
- Svetlana Romashina (born 1989), competitor in synchronized swimming; triple Olympic gold medalist
- Aziz Shavershian (1989–2011), Russian-Australian bodybuilder
- David Sigachev (born 1989), race car driver
- Filipp Toluzakov (born 1989), professional ice-hockey player
- Evgenia Ukolova (born 1989), beach volleyball player
- Ilya Zhitomirskiy (1989–2011), Russian-American software developer and entrepreneur
- Misha Zilberman (born 1989), Israeli Olympic badminton player

===== 1990 =====
- Ekaterina Bobrova (born 1990), ice dancer
- Sergei Denisov (born 1990), professional ice-hockey goaltender
- Evgeny Donskoy (born 1990), tennis player
- Ksenia Doronina (born 1990), figure skater
- Nikita Filatov (born 1990), professional ice-hockey player
- Svetlana Filippova (born 1990), springboard diver
- Lukas Geniušas (born 1990), Lithuanian-Russian pianist
- Igor Golovkov (born 1990), professional ice-hockey defenceman
- Mikhail Mamkin (born 1990), professional ice-hockey defenceman
- Arina Martynova (born 1990), figure skater
- Nick Matuhin (born 1990), German freestyle wrestler
- Evgeny Novikov (born 1990), rally driver
- Nyusha (born 1990), singer-songwriter

==== 1991–2000 ====
===== 1991 =====
- Alexander Denezhkin (born 1991), ice-hockey player
- Misha Ge (born 1991), Uzbekistani figure skater
- Nikita Katsalapov (born 1991), ice dancer
- Ivan Lukashevich (born 1991), racing driver
- Vyacheslav Pimenov (born 1991), triathlete
- Yury Revich (born 1991), classical violinist
- Ekaterina Riazanova (born 1991), ice dancer
- Ivan Righini (born 1991), Russian-Italian competitive figure skater
- Anastasia Rybachenko (born 1991), political and civic activist
- Georgi Shchennikov (born 1991), footballer
- Anna Sidorova (born 1991), curler
- Marta Sirotkina (born 1991), tennis player
- Daniil Tarasov (born 1991), ice-hockey player
- Yevgeni Tochilin (born 1991), former professional footballer
- Nikita Zaitsev (born 1991), ice-hockey defenceman

===== 1992 =====
- Stanislav Galiev (born 1992), ice-hockey left winger
- Nikita Gusev (born 1992), ice-hockey player
- Kirill Kabanov (born 1992), professional ice-hockey forward
- Elena Nikitina (born 1992), skeleton racer
- Olga Podchufarova (born 1992), biathlete
- Artyom Pugolovkin (born 1992), ice-hockey player
- Alexandra Saitova (bornb1992), member of the Russian national women's curling team

===== 1993 =====
- Sergey Bida (born 1993), Olympic silver-medalist épée fencer
- Ivan Bukin (born 1993), ice dancer
- Ilja Dragunov (born 1993), professional wrestler; first non-kayfabe Russian in WWE history
- Natela Dzalamidze (born 1993), Russian-Georgian tennis player
- Romina Gabdullina (born 1993), badminton player
- Artur Gachinski (born 1993), figure skater
- Aslan Karatsev (born 1993), tennis player
- Andrei Rogozine (born 1993), Canadian figure skater

===== 1994 =====
- Daria Gavrilova (born 1994), Russian-Australian tennis player
- Ilya Lyubushkin (born 1994), ice-hockey player
- Artem Markelov (born 1994), racing driver

===== 1995 =====
- Ivan Barbashev (born 1995), ice-hockey player
- Vyacheslav Karavayev (born 1995), footballer
- Yulia Putintseva (born 1995), tennis player
- Igor Shesterkin (born 1995), ice-hockey goaltender
- Victoria Sinitsina (born 1995), ice dancer
- Sergey Sirotkin (born 1995), professional racing driver
- Margarita Mamun (born 1995), rhythmic gymnast
- Nikita Zadorov (born 1995), ice-hockey player

===== 1996 =====
- Daniil Dubov (born 1996), chess grandmaster
- Karen Khachanov (born 1996), tennis player
- Anna Ovcharova (born 1996), figure skater
- Adelina Sotnikova (born 1996), figure skater

===== 1997 =====
- Lina Fedorova (born 1997), pair skater
- Yana Kudryavtseva (born 1997), rhythmic gymnast

===== 1998 =====
- Vasilisa Davankova (born 1998), pair skater
- Anna Kalinskaya (born 1998), tennis player
- Maria Kliundikova (born 1998), basketball player

===== 1999 =====
- Anastasiia Semenova (born 1999), badminton player
- Sofya Zhuk (born 1999), tennis player
- Evgenia Medvedeva (born 1999), figure skater
- Elena Radionova (born 1999), figure skater
- Nikita Mazepin (born 1999), Formula-one racing driver

===== 2000 =====
- Mikhail Iakovlev (born 2000), Moscow-born Israeli racing cyclist
- Mikhail Ignatov (born 2000) association footballer
- Vladimir Moskvichyov (born 2000), association footballer
- Danila Proshlyakov (born 2000), association footballer
- Alexander Romanov (born 2000), ice-hockey player
- Anton Shitov (born 2000), association footballer
- Elizabet Tursynbayeva (born 2000), figure skater

=== 21st century ===
==== 2001–2010 ====
- Ekaterina Starshova (born 2001), actress
- Alena Kostornaia (born 2003), figure skater
- Polina Shmatko (born 2003), rhythmic gymnast
- Mikhail Smirnov (born 2003), singer
- Danil Zhilkin (born 2003), Canadian-Russian ice-hockey player
- Anastasia Bezrukova (born 2004), actress and model
- Lala Kramarenko (born 2004), rhythmic gymnast
- Anna Shcherbakova (born 2004), figure skater
- Kristina Pimenova (born 2005), actress and model
- Alexandra Dovgan (born 2007), classical pianist
- Kristina Liutova (born 2010), tennis player

== Lived in Moscow ==
- Alexander Afanasyev (1826–1871), folklorist; recorded and published over 600 Russian folktales and fairytales
- Alexander Belyaev (1884–1942), science-fiction writer; lived in Moscow after 1923
- Sergey Ognev (1886–1951), scientist, zoologist and naturalist; graduated from Moscow University in 1910
- Osip Mandelstam (1891–1938), poet; moved to Moscow in 1922, exiled in 1934
- Anna Akhmatova (1889–1966), poet
- Nadezhda Mandelstam (1899–1980), memoirist; first moved to Moscow in 1922, joined Osip Mandelstam in exile in 1934, returned to Moscow in 1964
- Guy Burgess (1911–1963), British spy for the Soviet Union; fled to Moscow in 1951
- Kim Philby (1912–1988), British spy for the Soviet Union; fled to Moscow in 1963
- Donald Maclean (1913–1983), British spy for the Soviet Union; fled to Moscow in 1951
- Sergei Fomin (1917–1975), mathematician; entered Moscow State University at the age of 16
- Vera Gornostayeva (1929–2015), pianist and pedagogue
- German Fyodorov-Davydov (1931–2000), historian, archaeologist, numismatist and art historian; professor at Moscow State University
- Mahmoud Abbas (born 1935), president of the State of Palestine; president of the Palestinian National Authority; chairman of the Palestine Liberation Organisation; studied at the Peoples' Friendship University, where he earned his doctorate
- Oleg Gordievsky (born 1938), KGB defector
- Evgeny Kurochkin (1940–2011), paleornithologist; graduated from Moscow State University in 1964
- Svetlana Gannushkina (born 1942), mathematician and human-rights activist; former professor of mathematics at the Russian State University for the Humanities (1970–1999), located in Moscow
- Valentin Gavrilov (1946–2003), Soviet athlete who competed mainly in the high jump; trained at Dynamo in Moscow
- Armen Oganesyan (born 1954), chief executive officer of Russian state radio station Voice of Russia; educated at Moscow State University, Department of Journalism
- Bashar al-Assad (borm 1965), former president of Syria (2000–2024); granted asylum by the Russian government following his arrival to the city after the 2024 fall of the Assad regime
- Karen Oganyan (born 1982), former professional footballer; played in the Premier League with FC Moscow
- Dmitri Monya (born 1988), professional ice hockey winger; plays for HC CSKA Moscow of the Kontinental Hockey League (KHL)

== See also ==
- List of Russian people
- List of Russian-language poets
