= Yevgeny =

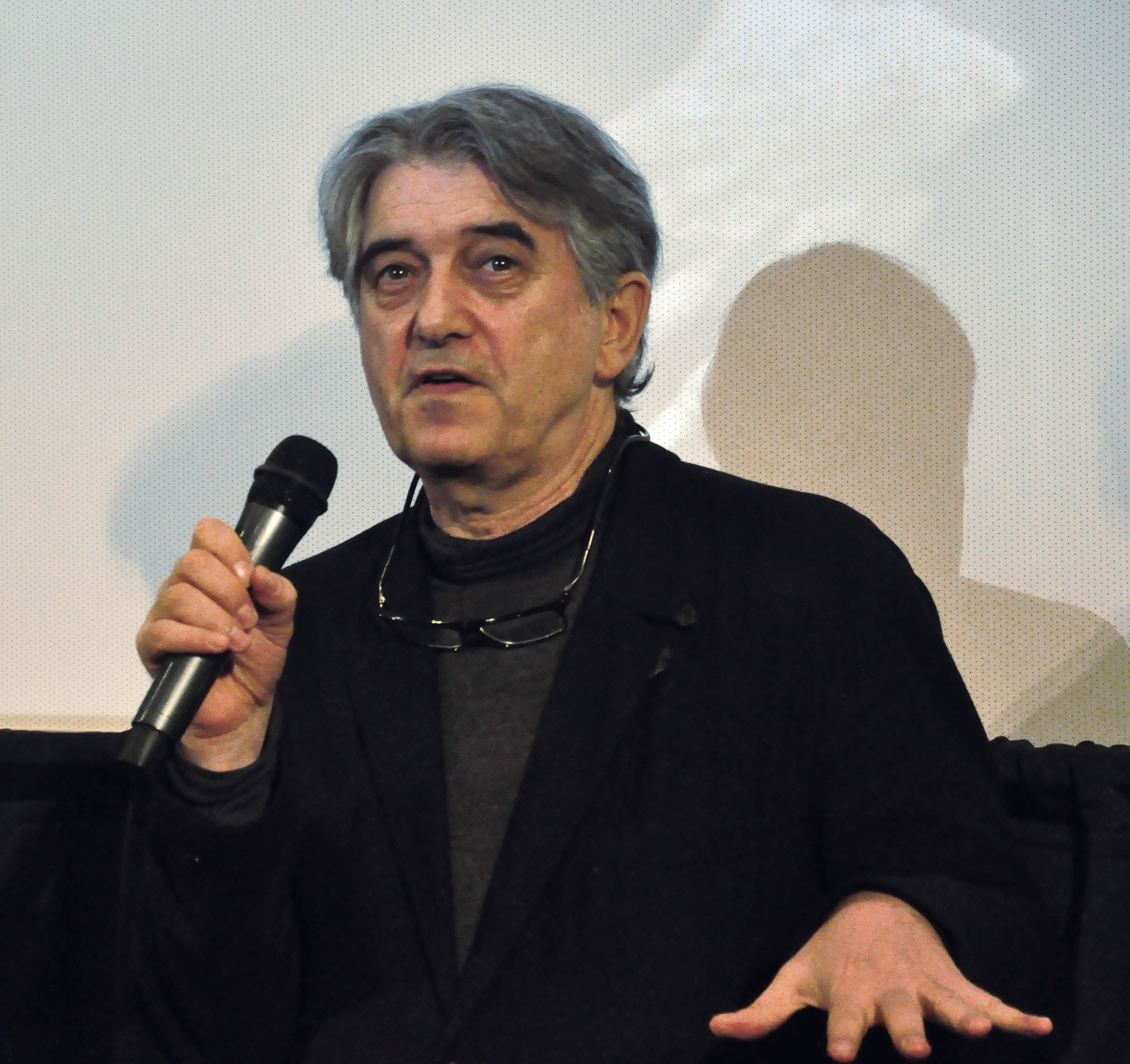
Evgeny Kamenkovich at the Moscow Center for Documentary Films, 3 March 2020

Yevgeni (Russian: Евгений), also transliterated as Yevgeny, Yevgenii, Yevgeniy, Evgeni, Evgeny, Evgenii, Evgeniy, Evgenyi or Evgenij, is the Russian form of the masculine given name Eugene. The short form is Zhenya (Женя), also transliterated as Jenya or Shenya.

People with the name include:

Note: Occasionally, a person may be in more than one section.

== Arts and entertainment ==
- Yevgeny Aryeh (1947–2022), Israeli theater director, playwright, scriptwriter and set designer
- Yevgeni Bauer (1865–1917), Russian film director and screenwriter
- Yevgeni Grishkovetz (born 1967), Russian writer, dramatist, stage director and actor
- Evgeny Kissin (born 1971), Russian-Israeli pianist
- Evgenij Kozlov (born 1955), Russian artist
- Yevgeny Leonov (1926–1994), Soviet and Russian actor
- Yevgeni Mokhorev (born 1967), Russian photographer
- Evgeny Mravinsky (1903–1988), Russian conductor
- Evgeny Ruman (born 1979), Israeli film and television director, film editor, and screenwriter
- Evgeny Svetlanov (1928–2002), Russian conductor
- Yevgeni Urbansky (1932–1965), Soviet Russian actor
- Evgeniy Voishvillo (1907–1993), Russian artist
- Yevgeniy Yevstigneyev (1926–1992), Soviet and Russian actor
- Yevgeny Yevtushenko (1933–2017), Soviet and Russian poet
- Yevgeny Zamyatin (1884–1937), Russian author of political satire and science fiction
- Evgeny Zharikov (1941–2012), Soviet and Russian actor

== Chess ==
- Evgeny Bareev (born 1966), Russian-Canadian chess grandmaster
- Evgenij Ermenkov (born 1949), Bulgarian chess player
- Evgeny Gleizerov (born 1963), Russian chess grandmaster
- Evgenij Miroshnichenko (born 1978), Ukrainian chess grandmaster
- Evgeniy Najer (born 1977), Russian chess grandmaster
- Evgeny Shtembuliak (born 1999), Ukrainian chess grandmaster
- Evgeniy Solozhenkin (born 1966), Russian chess grandmaster
- Evgeny Tomashevsky (born 1987), Russian chess grandmaster

== Sports ==
- Evgeny Alexandrov (born 1982), Russian ice hockey player
- Evgeniy Averchenko (born 1982), Kazakh footballer
- Yevgeni Balyaikin (born 1988), Russian footballer
- Evgeniy Barbakov (born 1954), Russian rower
- Evgeniy Belov (born 1990), Russian cross-country skier
- Evgeni Berzin (born 1970), Russian bicycle road racer
- Evgeniy Borisov (born 1984), Russian hurdler
- Evgeny Busygin (born 1987), Russian ice hockey player
- Yevgeni Bushmanov (born 1971), retired Russian football player
- Evgenii Dadonov (born 1989), Russian ice hockey player
- Yevgeni Dolgov (born 1969), Soviet and Russian retired football player
- Evgenij Dremin (born 1981), Russian badminton player
- Evgeniy Erofaylov (born 1975), Uzbekistani wrestler
- Evgeniy Garanichev (born 1988), Russian biathlete
- Evgeniy Gerganov (born 1975), Bulgarian road cyclist
- Evgeniy Goncharov (born 1986), Russian mixed martial artist
- Yevgeny Kafelnikov (born 1974), Russian retired tennis player
- Evgeni Karpoukhine (born 1973), Russian judoka
- Yevgeni Kharlachyov (born 1974), Russian retired football player
- Evgenii Klimov (born 1994), Russian ski jumper and skier
- Yevgeni Korablyov (born 1978), Russian footballer
- Evgeny Korolev (born 1988), Kazakh tennis player
- Yevgeni Kulik (born 1993), Russian ice hockey player
- Evgeny Kuznetsov (born 1992), Russian ice hockey player
- Yevgeni Kuznetsov (born 1983), Russian footballer
- Evgeny Lapenkov (born 1984), Russian ice hockey player
- Yevgeny Lapinsky (1942–1999), Soviet Olympic champion volleyball player
- Evgenii Lukantsov (born 1991), Russian canoeist
- Yevgeni Makeyev (born 1989), Russian football player
- Evgeniy Malinin (born 1986), Kyrgyzstani footballer
- Evgeni Malkin (born 1986), Russian ice hockey player in the National Hockey League
- Yevgeni Malkov (born 1988), Russian football player
- Yevgeny Maskinskov (1930–1985), Soviet athlete who competed mainly in the 50 kilometre walk
- Yevgeni Matyugin (born 1981), Moldovan international footballer
- Yevgeni Mayorov (1938–1997), ice hockey player who played in the Soviet Hockey League
- Yevgeni Minaev (1933–1993), Russian former weightlifter
- Yevgeni Mishakov (1941–2007), retired ice hockey player
- Evgeni Nabokov (born 1975), retired goalie in the National Hockey League
- Evgeniy Pashutin (born 1969), Russian basketball coach and player
- Evgeniy Pechenin (born 1984), Russian cross-country mountain biker
- Evgeni Plushenko (born 1982), Russian figure skater and four-time Olympic medalist
- Evgeniy Prokopchuk (born 1994), Russian judoka
- Evgenyi Romanov (born 1985), Russian boxer
- Yevgeni Safonov (born 1977), Uzbekistan national team football player
- Evgeni Semenenko (born 2003), Russian figure skater
- Evgenii Shvetcov (born 1998), Russian Paralympic track and field athlete
- Yevgeni Sidorov (born 1956), Soviet and Russian retired football player and current manager
- Evgeny Siminiuc (born 2002), Canadian artistic gymnast
- Evgenij Spiridonov (born 1982), German artistic gymnast
- Evgeniy Sviridov (bandy) (born 1974), Belarusian bandy player
- Evgeniy Tengel (born 1993), Belarusian sprint canoeist
- Evgeniy Timofeev (born 1994), Kyrgyzstani alpine skier
- Evgenii Tiurnev (born 1997), Russian tennis player
- Evgenii Torsunov (born 1990), Russian para-athlete
- Yevgeni Trefilov (born 1955), Russian team handball coach
- Yevgeni Varlamov (born 1975), Russian retired football player
- Evgeniy Yarovenko (born 1963), Kazakh-Ukrainian footballer
- Yevgeni Yatchenko (born 1986), Russian footballer
- Yevgeni Zimin (1947–2018), retired ice hockey player

== Other ==
- Evgeniy Abdullaev (born 1971), Russian-Uzbek poet, writer and critic
- Evgeny Agranovich (1918–2010), Soviet poet and bard
- Evgenii Alexeev (1946–1987), Ukrainian botanist
- Evgeniy Chuikov (1924–2000), Ukrainian landscape painter
- Yevgeny Chuplinsky (born 1965), prolific Russian serial killer
- Yevgeny Emano (born 1975), Filipino politician
- Evgeniy Gabrilovich, Belarusian research director
- Yevgeny Kaspersky (born 1965), Russian information security expert and entrepreneur
- Evgenii Landis (1921–1997), Soviet mathematician
- Evgeny Lebedev (born 1980), Russian-born British newspaper publisher
- Evgeny Lifshitz (1915–1985), Soviet theoretical physicist
- Evgeniy Maloletka (born 1987), Ukrainian journalist and photographer
- Evgeny Morozov (born 1984), Belarusian journalist
- Evgeniy Morozov (choirmaster) (1944–2016), Russian choirmaster
- Evgenii Nikishin (1945–1986), Soviet mathematician
- Yevgeni Nikolayev (1921–1990), Soviet World War II colonel and Hero of the Soviet Union
- Yevgeni Pakhomov (1880–1965), Russian, Georgian and Azerbaijani numismatist and archaeologist
- Evgeny Paton (1870–1953), Ukrainian and Soviet engineer
- Yevgeny Pepelyaev (1918–2013), Soviet fighter pilot
- Evgeny Perlin (born 1990), Belarusian journalist and television presenter
- Evgeniy Poddubny (born 1983), Russian war correspondent and propagandist
- Yevgeni Preobrazhensky (1886–1937), Old Bolshevik, an economist and a member of the Communist Party of the Soviet Union
- Yevgeny Prigozhin (1961–2023), Russian oligarch and founder of Wagner Group
- Evgenii Przhevalsky (1879–1953), Russian chemist
- Yevgeny Shaposhnikov (1942–2020), Soviet marshal and last Minister of Defence of the Soviet Union
- Evgeniy Shiryaev (1943–2023), Russian composer
- Evgeniy Svetlitsa (born 1983), Ukrainian ballet dancer
- Evgenii Troubetzkoy (1863–1920), Russian philosopher
- Evgeny Velikhov (1935–2024), Russian physicist
- Evgenii Wulff (1885–1941), Russian botanist, biologist and plant geographer
- Yevgenii Vasilevich Zolotov (1922–1990), Soviet mathematician

== See also ==
- Yevgen
- 24609 Evgenij, a minor planet
