= Kushchenko =

Kushchenko is a Ukrainian surname.

- Anya Kushchenko, Russian former intelligence agent, media personality, and model
- Oksana Kushchenko, Russian freestyle skier
- Sergey Kushchenko, Russian sports manager

== See also ==
- Kashchenko
- Kishchenko
