= Verkhovsky =

Verkhovsky (masculine), Verkhovskaya (feminine), or Verkhovskoye (neuter) may refer to:

== People ==
- Aleksandr Verkhovsky (1886–1938), Russian military and political figure
- Anya Verkhovskaya (born c. 1969), consultant, movie producer, and activist
- Serge Verkhovsky, bassist of Limp (band)

== Places ==
- Verkhovsky District, a district in Oryol Oblast, Russia
- Verkhovsky (inhabited locality) (Verkhovskaya, Verkhovskoye), name of several rural localities in Russia

== See also ==
- Alexander Verkhovskiy (born 1956), Russian entrepreneur
