= Kuklev =

Kuklev (Russian: Куклев, from кукла meaning doll) is a Russian masculine surname, its feminine counterpart is Kukleva. It may refer to

- Galina Kukleva (born 1972), Russian biathlete
- Mikhail Kuklev (born 1982), Russian ice hockey defenceman
- Valentin Kuklev (born 1948), Russian author
