= Prokudin =

Prokudin (Russian: Прокудин) is a Russian masculine surname, its feminine counterpart is Prokudina. Notable people with the surname include:

- Aleksei Prokudin (born 1982), Russian football player
- Oleksandr Prokudin (born 1983), Ukrainian governor of Kherson Oblast
- Pavel Prokudin (born 1966), Prime Minister of Transnistria
- Sergey Prokudin-Gorsky (1863–1944), Russian chemist and photographer
