= Grankin =

Grankin (Russian: Гранкин) is a Russian masculine surname, its feminine counterpart is Grankina. Notable people with the surname include:

- Andrei Grankin (born 1987), Russian ice hockey player
- Sergey Grankin (born 1985), Russian volleyball player
