= Yevgenyev =

Yevgenyev, feminine: Yevgenyeva is a Russian surname derived from the given name Yevgeniy.

- Aleksandr Yevgenyev
- Roman Yevgenyev
