= Tochilin =

Tochilin (f: Tochilina) is a Russian-language surname derived from the word tochilo, meaning 'grinder' or 'grindstone'. Notable people with this surname include:

- Aleksandr Tochilin (born 1974), Russian football coach and former player
- Pyotr Tochilin (born 1991), Russian football player
- Yevgeni Tochilin (born 1974), Russian film director and screenwriter
