= Denezhkin =

Denezhkin (masculine, Russian: Денезхин, Ukrainian: Денезхін) or Denezhkina (feminine, Russian: Денезхина, Ukrainian: Денезхіна) is a Russian and Ukrainian surname. Notable people with the surname include:

- Alexander Denezhkin (born 1991), Russian ice hockey player
- Irina Denezhkina (born 1981), Russian writer

== See also ==
- Denezhkin Kamen Nature Reserve in Russia
