= Kirill Terentyev =

Russian footballer

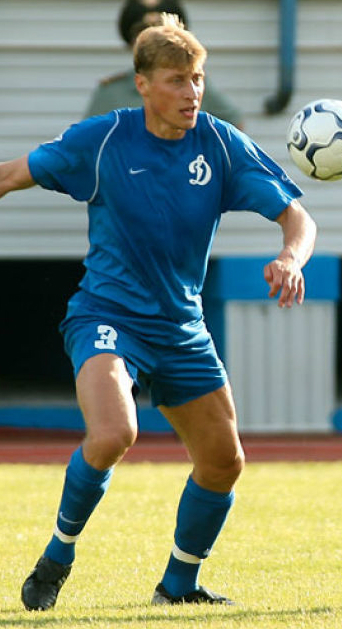
- Terentyev in 2007

Personal information
- Full name: Kirill Aleksandrovich Terentyev
- Date of birth: 1 November 1979 (age 46)
- Place of birth: Moscow, Russian SFSR
- Height: 1.84 m (6 ft 1/2 in)
- Positions: Defender; midfielder

Youth career
- FC Spartak Moscow

Senior career*
Years	Team	Apps	(Gls)
1998	FC Patriot Moscow		
1999	FC Sportakademklub Moscow	4	(0)
2002	FC Mostransgaz Gazoprovod	23	(0)
2003	FC Uralan Plus Moscow	3	(0)
2003–2005	FC Spartak Shchyolkovo	52	(0)
2006	FC Oka Stupino (amateur)		
2007	FC Dynamo Bryansk	27	(1)
2008	FC Avangard Kursk	31	(0)
2009	FC Oka Stupino (amateur)		
2010	FC Avangard Kursk	12	(0)
2011	FC Volga Tver	14	(0)
2012–2013	FC Oka Stupino (amateur)		
2015–2016	FC Odintsovo		
- * Club domestic league appearances and goals

Kirill Aleksandrovich Terentyev (Russian: Кирилл Александрович Терентьев; born 1 November 1979) is a former Russian professional football player.

== Club career ==
He played two seasons in the Russian Football National League for FC Dynamo Bryansk and FC Avangard Kursk.
