= Igor Skorokhodov =

Russian ice hockey player

- Born: May 4, 1986 (age 38); Cherepovets, Russian SFSR
- Height: 5 ft 9 in (175 cm)
- Weight: 190 lb (86 kg; 13 st 8 lb)
- Position: Right Wing
- Shot: Left
- Played for: Severstal Cherepovets; HC Vityaz; HC Yugra; Salavat Yulaev Ufa; Metallurg Novokuznetsk; Lada Togliatti
- Playing career: 2004–2018

Igor Skorokhodov (born May 4, 1986) is a Russian former professional ice hockey forward who played in the Kontinental Hockey League (KHL). He most notably played with HC Yugra for 6 seasons.

During the 2018–19 season, Skorokhodov returned to HC Yugra in their first season of the transition to the VHL. He earned 1 assist in 8 games before opting to immediately end his 12-year professional career on October 25, 2018.
