= Vitali Sitnikov =

Russian ice hockey player

- Born: September 16, 1981 (age 44) Nizhny Tagil, Russian SFSR
- Height: 5 ft 9 in (175 cm)
- Weight: 198 lb (90 kg; 14 st 2 lb)
- Position: Forward
- Shoots: Left
- ALIH team Former teams: PSK Sakhalin; HC MVD; Avtomobilist Yekaterinburg; HC Ugra; Severstal Cherepovets; Saryarka Karaganda; HC 07 Detva
- Playing career: 2000–present

Vitali Sitnikov (born September 16, 1981) is a Russian professional ice hockey forward who currently plays with PSK Sakhalin in the Asia League Ice Hockey (ALIH).

On November 28, 2015 during a KHL game, Sitnikov was accidentally struck on the throat by the blade of Ladislav Nagy's skate. He immediately went to the bench where upon removing his jersey it was discovered that the skate had slashed his throat which was bleeding. He then proceeded to fall back on the bench before receiving medical attention. He required surgery to close the cut and missed one game.
