= Vasili Yakovlevich Zinger =

Russian botanist, mathematician, philosopher (1836–1907)

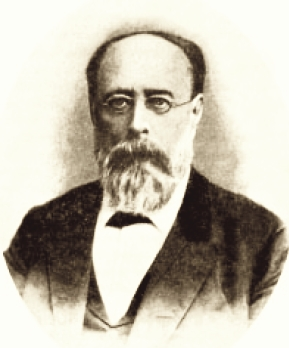
(unknown date, approximately. 1880–1890)

Vasili Yakovlevich Zinger (Russian: Василий Яковлевич Цингер; 11 February 1836 – 2 March 1907) was a Russian mathematician, botanist and philosopher. His name is sometimes spelled Wasili Jakowlewitsch Zinger.

== Early life and education ==
Zinger was born in Moscow. His father was a teacher of mathematics. Zinger graduated in 1859 from the Imperial Moscow University, where he majored in mathematics. He earned a doctoral degree in 1867.

== Career ==
Zinger was an active member of the Moscow Mathematical Society and the president of the society (1886–1891).

He also wrote some philosophical essays.

=== Zinger as botanist ===
Zinger was also a botanist and wrote some works about the plants of central Russia.

Zingeria of the Poaceae was named in honour of Vasily Zinger.

== See also ==
- List of botanists
- List of people from Moscow
- List of Russian biologists
- List of Russian mathematicians
- List of Russian philosophers
