= Mikhail Mamkin =

Russian ice hockey player

- Born: August 7, 1990 (age 36) Moscow, Russian SFSR, Soviet Union
- Height: 6 ft 1 in (185 cm)
- Weight: 212 lb (96 kg; 15 st 2 lb)
- Position: Defence
- Shoots: Right
- KHL team Former teams: Salavat Yulaev Ufa; Spartak Moscow; HC Ugra; HC Sochi; Avtomobilist Yekaterinburg
- Playing career: 2011–present

Mikhail Mamkin (born August 7, 1990) is a Russian professional ice hockey defenceman. He is currently playing with Salavat Yulaev Ufa of the Kontinental Hockey League (|KHL).

Mamkin made his Kontinental Hockey League (KHL) debut playing with Spartak Moscow during the 2011–12 KHL season.
