= Yevgen =

Yevgen (Ukrainian: Євген) is a given name. Notable people with the name include:

- Yevgen Bolibrukh (born 1983), Ukrainian professional racing cyclist
- Yevgen Murzin (born 1965), Ukrainian basketball coach for the Ukrainian national team
- Yevgen Rogachov (born 1983), Ukrainian futsal player
- Yevgen Sotnikov (1980–2021), Ukrainian judoka
- Yevgen Synelnykov (born 1981), Ukrainian TV presenter, director, actor
- Yevgen Zakharov (born 1952), Ukrainian human rights activist

== See also ==
- Yevgeny
