= Ivan Lekomtsev =

Russian ice hockey player

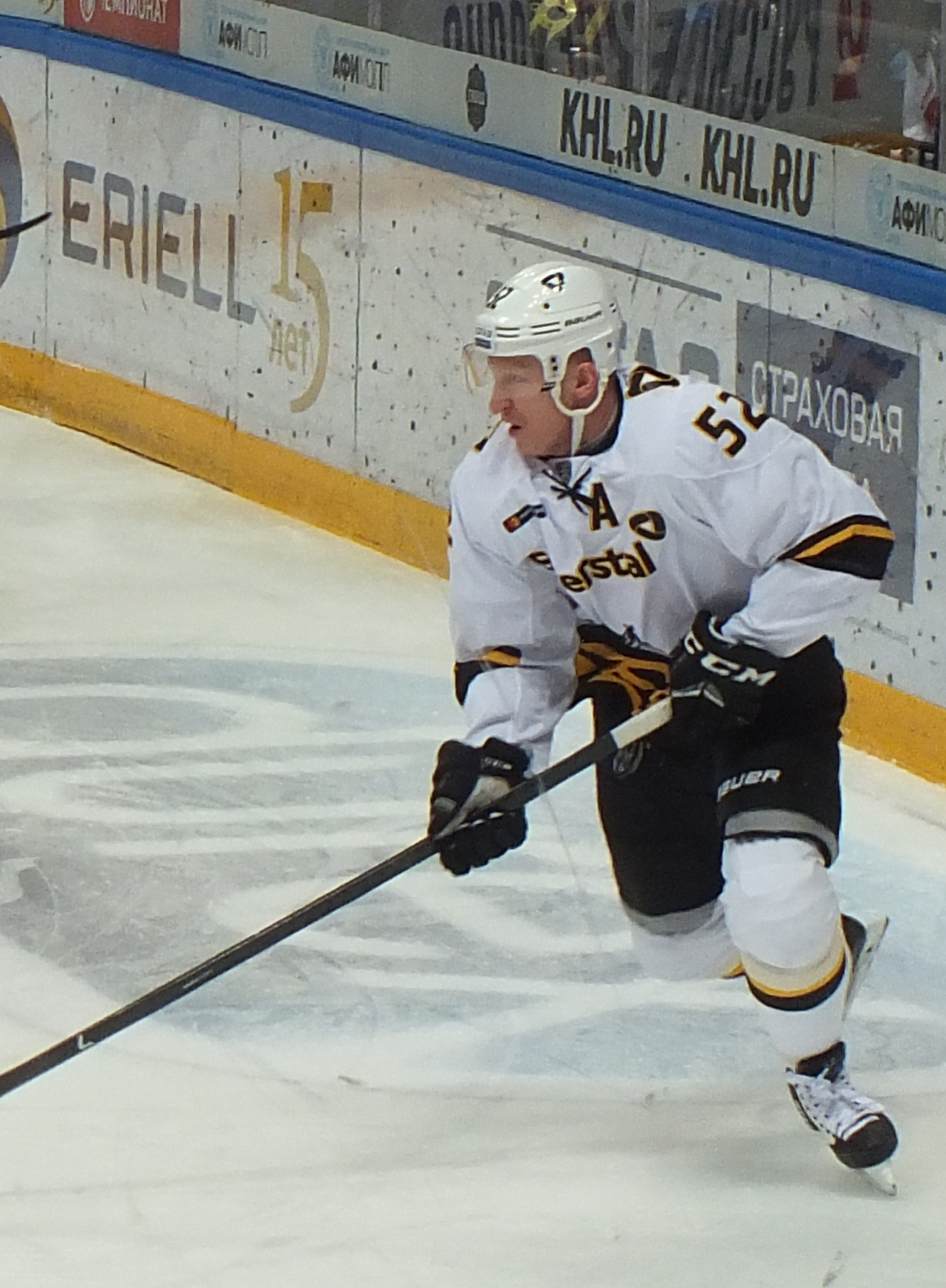
- Born: July 19, 1985 (age 40) Glazov, Russian SFSR, Soviet Union
- Height: 6 ft 0 in (183 cm)
- Weight: 185 lb (84 kg; 13 st 3 lb)
- Position: Defence
- Shoots: Right
- KHL team Former teams: Free Agent; Yunost Minsk; HC Neftekhimik Nizhnekamsk; Lada Togliatti; HC Yugra; Sibir Novosibirsk; Salavat Yulaev Ufa; Avangard Omsk; Lokomotiv Yaroslavl; Severstal Cherepovets
- Playing career: 2003–present

Ivan Alexandrovich Lekomtsev (born July 19, 1985) is a Russian professional ice hockey defenceman who is currently an unrestricted free agent. He most recently played under contract for the Severstal Cherepovets in the Kontinental Hockey League (KHL).

Lekomtsev joined Severstal as a free agent, signing a one-year deal on July 24, 2018. He previously spent the 2017–18 season split between HC Yugra and Lokomotiv Yaroslavl.
