= Mikhail Zhukov (ice hockey) =

Russian ice hockey player

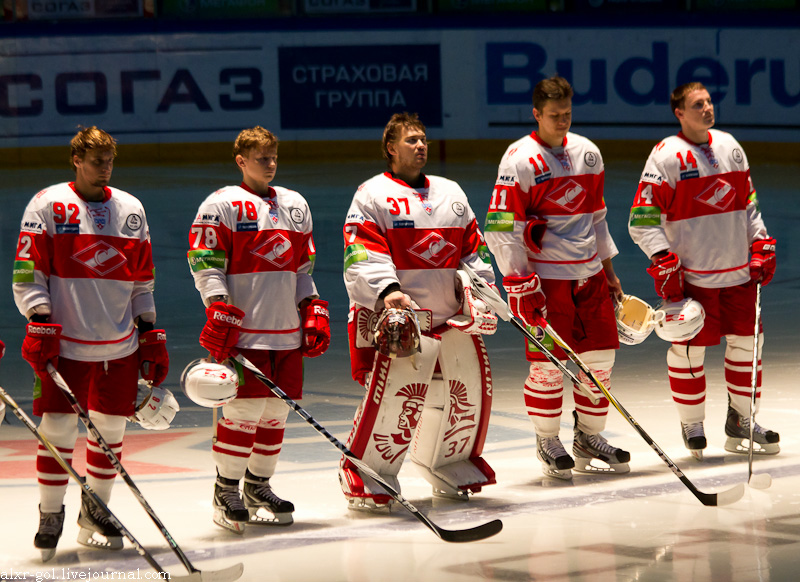
- From the left to the right: Pavel Medvedev, Alexander Komaristy, Ivan Kasutin, Mikhail Zhukov, Štefan Ružička
- Born: January 3, 1985 (age 41) Leningrad, Russian SFSR, Soviet Union
- Height: 6 ft 3 in (191 cm)
- Weight: 212 lb (96 kg; 15 st 2 lb)
- Position: Center
- Shot: Left
- KHL team Former teams: Free Agent; HV71; Ak Bars Kazan; Spartak Moscow; Lada Togliatti; Severstal Cherepovets; SKA St. Petersburg; Vityaz Chekhov; Avangard Omsk; HC Yugra; Neftekhimik Nizhnekamsk; Torpedo Nizhny Novgorod
- NHL draft: 72nd overall, 2003; Edmonton Oilers
- Playing career: 2001–2018

Mikhail Zhukov (born January 3, 1985, in Leningrad, Russian SFSR, Soviet Union) is a Russian professional ice hockey center who is currently an unrestricted free agent. He most recently played for Torpedo Nizhny Novgorod of the Kontinental Hockey League

Zhukov was selected by the Edmonton Oilers in the 3rd round (72nd overall) of the 2003 NHL entry draft.

== Career statistics ==
			Regular season					Playoffs
Season	Team	League	GP	G	A	Pts	PIM	GP	G	A	Pts	PIM
2000–01	Mora IK	J18 Allsv	7	2	6	8	2	—	—	—	—	—
2000–01	Mora IK	J20	18	6	8	14	4	5	1	1	2	2
2001–02	IFK Arboga IK	Allsv	37	4	9	13	12	3	1	0	1	2
2002–03	IFK Arboga IK	Allsv	41	9	14	23	30	3	3	1	4	0
2003–04	HV71	SEL	3	0	0	0	0	—	—	—	—	—
2003–04	Västerås IK	Allsv	44	5	12	17	16	—	—	—	—	—
2004–05	Ak Bars Kazan	RSL	2	0	0	0	0	—	—	—	—	—
2004–05	Ak Bars–2 Kazan	RUS.3	16	7	11	18	0	—	—	—	—	—
2004–05	Spartak Moscow	RSL	13	1	2	3	2	—	—	—	—	—
2005–06	Ak Bars Kazan	RSL	38	1	7	8	8	4	0	1	1	0
2006–07	Ak Bars Kazan	RSL	37	2	7	9	26	11	0	4	4	4
2006–07	Ak Bars–2 Kazan	RUS.3	4	2	4	6	2	—	—	—	—	—
2007–08	Ak Bars Kazan	RSL	43	3	8	11	16	4	0	0	0	0
2007–08	Ak Bars–2 Kazan	RUS.3	1	2	1	3	0	—	—	—	—	—
2008–09	Ak Bars Kazan	KHL	35	5	5	10	10	8	0	1	1	2
2008–09	Ak Bars–2 Kazan	RUS.3	3	1	2	3	2	—	—	—	—	—
2009–10	Lada Togliatti	KHL	6	1	0	1	0	—	—	—	—	—
2009–10	Severstal Cherepovets	KHL	42	3	7	10	43	—	—	—	—	—
2010–11	Severstal Cherepovets	KHL	14	0	1	1	17	—	—	—	—	—
2010–11	SKA St. Petersburg	KHL	2	0	0	0	0	—	—	—	—	—
2010–11	Spartak Moscow	KHL	28	4	6	10	14	4	0	1	1	0
2011–12	Spartak Moscow	KHL	20	1	8	9	16	—	—	—	—	—
2011–12	HC Vityaz	KHL	16	4	5	9	20	—	—	—	—	—
2011–12	Avangard Omsk	KHL	14	0	0	0	8	6	0	1	1	4
2012–13	Spartak Moscow	KHL	35	2	7	9	10	—	—	—	—	—
2012–13	Buran Voronezh	VHL	6	1	3	4	2	—	—	—	—	—
2012–13	HC Yugra	KHL	4	1	2	3	2	—	—	—	—	—
2013–14	HC Yugra	KHL	51	9	14	23	30	—	—	—	—	—
2014–15	Neftekhimik Nizhnekamsk	KHL	49	4	13	17	14	—	—	—	—	—
2015–16	Neftekhimik Nizhnekamsk	KHL	59	16	20	36	49	4	0	1	1	2
2016–17	Ak Bars Kazan	KHL	34	1	8	9	2	—	—	—	—	—
2016–17	Neftekhimik Nizhnekamsk	KHL	6	0	2	2	16	—	—	—	—	—
2017–18	Torpedo Nizhny Novgorod	KHL	38	2	7	9	16	4	1	0	1	0
Allsv totals			122	18	35	53	58	6	4	1	5	2
RSL totals			133	7	24	31	52	19	0	5	5	4
KHL totals			453	53	105	158	267	26	1	4	5	8
