= Sergei Pereshivalov =

Russian footballer

Personal information
- Full name: Sergei Anatolyevich Pereshivalov
- Date of birth: 23 October 1983 (age 43)
- Place of birth: Moscow, Russian SFSR
- Height: 1.78 m (5 ft 10 in)
- Position: Midfielder

Youth career
- Krasny Oktyabr Moscow

Senior career*
Years	Team	Apps	(Gls)
2001	FC Oka Stupino (amateur)		
2001–2003	FC Torpedo-Metallurg Moscow	1	(0)
2003	FC Titan Moscow	11	(2)
2004–2005	FC Torpedo-RG Moscow (amateur)		
2006–2008	FC Torpedo-RG Moscow	93	(7)
2009–2010	FC Istra	33	(0)
2012–2013	FC Vybor Odintsovo		
- * Club domestic league appearances and goals

Sergei Anatolyevich Pereshivalov (Russian: Серге́й Анатольевич Перешивалов; born 23 October 1983) is a former Russian professional footballer.

== Club career ==
He made his debut in the Russian Premier League in 2002 for FC Torpedo-ZIL Moscow.
