= Kishchenko =

Kishchenko (Ukrainian: Кищенко; Russian: Кищенко; Belarusian: Кішчанка) is a surname. Notable people with the surname include:

- Sergei Kishchenko (born 1972), Russian footballer
- Vitali Kishchenko (born 1964), Soviet and Russian actor
