= Ivan Khlyntsev =

Russian ice hockey player

- Born: June 16, 1981 (age 43); Salavat, Soviet Union
- Height: 5 ft 9 in (175 cm)
- Weight: 185 lb (84 kg; 13 st 3 lb)
- Position: Forward
- Shot: Right
- Played for: HC Neftekhimik Nizhnekamsk; Salavat Yulaev Ufa; HC Yugra
- NHL draft: Undrafted
- Playing career: 1999–2016

Ivan Khlyntsev (born June 16, 1981) is a former Russian professional ice hockey forward who played in the Russian Superleague (RSL) and Kontinental Hockey League (KHL).
