= Verkhovsky (inhabited locality) =

Verkhovsky (Russian: Верховский; masculine), Verkhovskaya (Верховская; feminine), or Verkhovskoye (Верховское; neuter) is the name of several rural localities in Russia:

- Verkhovsky (rural locality), a settlement in Yarnemsky Selsoviet of Plesetsky District of Arkhangelsk Oblast
- Verkhovskoye, Kaluga Oblast, a village in Maloyaroslavetsky District of Kaluga Oblast
- Verkhovskoye, Krasnodar Krai, a selo in Razdolsky Rural Okrug of the City of Sochi, Krasnodar Krai
- Verkhovskoye, Nizhny Novgorod Oblast, a selo in Khmelevitsky Selsoviet of Shakhunya, Nizhny Novgorod Oblast
- Verkhovskoye, Novgorod Oblast, a village in Yegolskoye Settlement of Borovichsky District of Novgorod Oblast
- Verkhovskaya, Arkhangelsk Oblast, a village in Malodorsky Selsoviet of Ustyansky District of Arkhangelsk Oblast
- Verkhovskaya, Kemerovo Oblast, a village in Bekovskaya Rural Territory of Belovsky District of Kemerovo Oblast
- Verkhovskaya, Komi Republic, a village in Zamezhnaya selo Administrative Territory of Ust-Tsilemsky District of the Komi Republic
- Verkhovskaya, Nizhny Novgorod Oblast, a village in Khmelevitsky Selsoviet of Shakhunya, Nizhny Novgorod Oblast
- Verkhovsky Pogost, a selo in Vologda Oblast
