= Sergei Gusev =

Russian ice hockey player (born 1975)

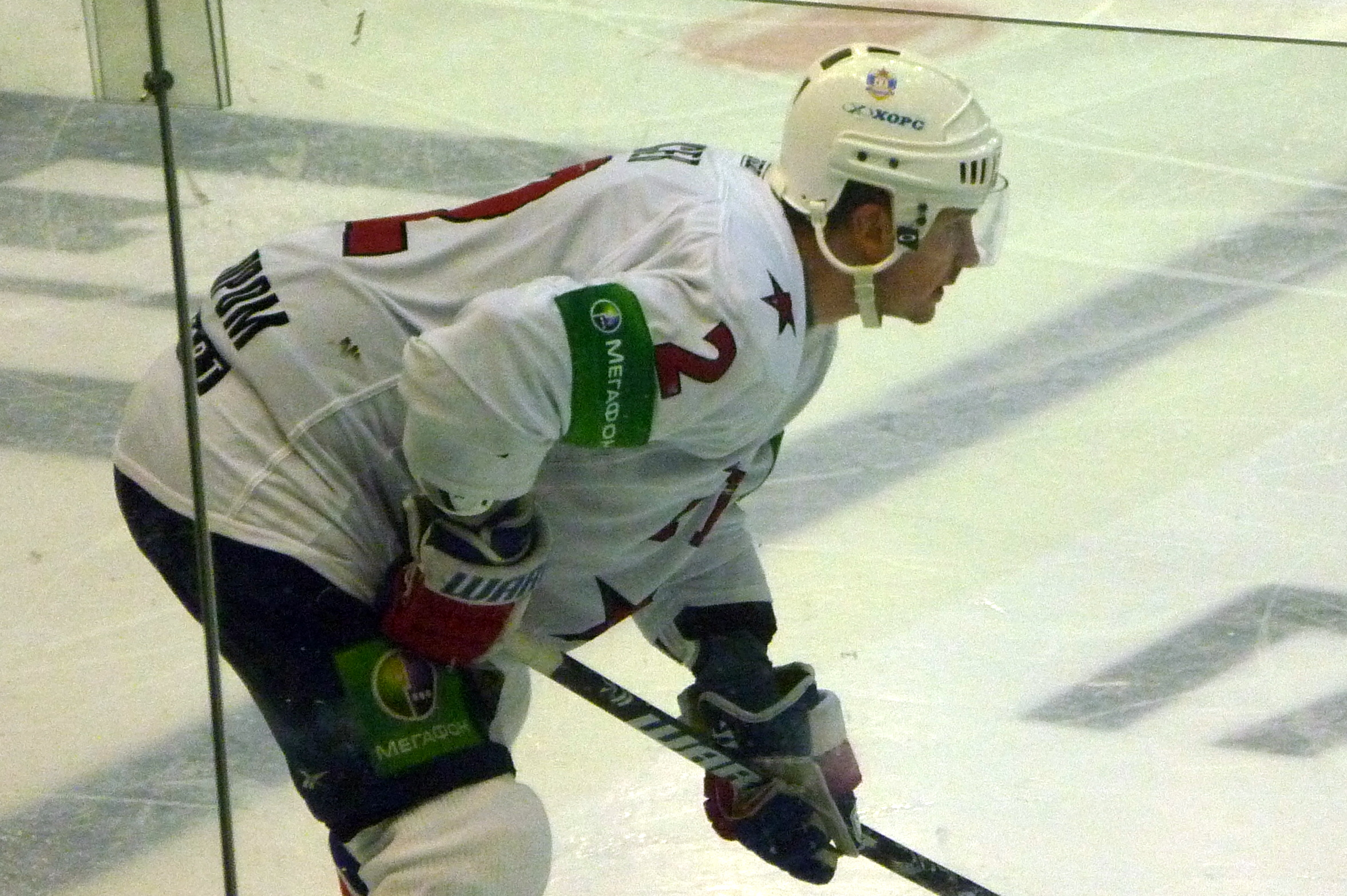
- Born: July 31, 1975 (age 50) Nizhny Tagil, Soviet Union
- Height: 6 ft 2 in (188 cm)
- Weight: 216 lb (98 kg; 15 st 6 lb)
- Position: Defence
- Shot: Left
- Played for: CSK VVS Samara; Dallas Stars; Tampa Bay Lightning; Severstal Cherepovets; Avangard Omsk; SKA Saint Petersburg; Avtomobilist Yekaterinburg; HC Yugra
- National team: Russia
- NHL draft: 69th overall, 1995; Dallas Stars
- Playing career: 1994–2017

Sergei Vladimirovich Gusev (Russian: Сергей Владимирович Гусев; born July 31, 1975) is a Russian former professional ice hockey defenceman. He played in the National Hockey League (NHL) with the Dallas Stars, while enjoying a lengthy career in his native Russia in the Kontinental Hockey League (KHL). Gusev was drafted 69th overall by the Stars in the 1995 NHL entry draft.

== Playing career ==
Gusev played four seasons in the National Hockey League, with the Dallas Stars and the Tampa Bay Lightning, where he scored 4 goals and 10 assists for 14 points in 89 games, and had up 34 penalty minutes.

In 2001, Gusev returned to Russia to play for Severstal Cherepovets before joining SKA Saint Petersburg. He played 25 professional seasons before ending his career with HC Yugra of the KHL at the conclusion of the 2016–17 season.

== Career statistics ==
=== Regular season and playoffs ===
			Regular season					Playoffs
Season	Team	League	GP	G	A	Pts	PIM	GP	G	A	Pts	PIM
1994–95	CSK VVS Samara	IHL	50	3	5	8	58	—	—	—	—	—
1995–96	Michigan K-Wings	IHL	73	11	17	28	76	—	—	—	—	—
1996–97	Michigan K-Wings	IHL	51	7	8	15	44	4	0	4	4	6
1997–98	Michigan K-Wings	IHL	36	3	6	9	36	4	0	2	2	6
1997–98	Dallas Stars	NHL	9	0	0	0	2	—	—	—	—	—
1998–99	Michigan K-Wings	IHL	12	0	6	6	14	—	—	—	—	—
1998–99	Dallas Stars	NHL	22	1	4	5	6	—	—	—	—	—
1998–99	Tampa Bay Lightning	NHL	14	0	3	3	10	—	—	—	—	—
1999–00	Tampa Bay Lightning	NHL	28	2	3	5	6	—	—	—	—	—
2000–01	Detroit Vipers	IHL	13	1	4	5	10	—	—	—	—	—
2000–01	Tampa Bay Lightning	NHL	16	1	0	1	10	—	—	—	—	—
2001–02	Severstal Cherepovets	RSL	41	4	9	13	26	4	0	1	1	6
2002–03	Severstal Cherepovets	RSL	46	3	9	12	28	12	1	1	2	6
2003–04	Severstal Cherepovets	RSL	46	2	9	11	52	—	—	—	—	—
2004–05	Avangard Omsk	RSL	60	2	10	12	44	11	0	1	1	14
2005–06	Avangard Omsk	RSL	46	7	8	15	42	13	1	4	5	12
2006–07	SKA Saint Petersburg	RSL	39	3	8	11	54	3	0	0	0	6
2007–08	SKA Saint Petersburg	RSL	20	1	4	5	12	7	0	3	3	6
2008–09	SKA Saint Petersburg	KHL	50	4	11	15	46	3	0	0	0	2
2009–10	SKA Saint Petersburg	KHL	36	2	4	6	30	4	0	0	0	0
2010–11	SKA Saint Petersburg	KHL	49	3	6	9	40	6	0	1	1	2
2011–12	Avangard Omsk	KHL	26	1	5	6	28	16	0	0	0	6
2012–13	Avtomobilist Yekaterinburg	KHL	47	5	12	17	44	—	—	—	—	—
2012–13	Avangard Omsk	KHL	3	0	0	0	2	6	0	0	0	4
2013–14	Avtomobilist Yekaterinburg	KHL	48	1	9	10	28	4	0	0	0	6
2014–15	Avtomobilist Yekaterinburg	KHL	33	2	5	7	14	5	0	0	0	4
2015–16	Avtomobilist Yekaterinburg	KHL	15	0	0	0	6	—	—	—	—	—
2015–16	Avangard Omsk	KHL	18	1	0	1	10	10	0	0	0	4
2016–17	HC Yugra	KHL	23	0	4	4	14	—	—	—	—	—
NHL totals			89	4	10	14	34	—	—	—	—	—
KHL totals			348	19	56	75	262	54	0	1	1	23

=== International ===
Year	Team	Event	Result	GP	G	A	Pts	PIM
1995	Russia	WJC	2nd place, silver medalist(s)	7	1	3	4	4
2002	Russia	WC	2nd place, silver medalist(s)	3	0	0	0	0
2003	Russia	WC	5th	7	0	2	2	0
2005	Russia	WC	3rd place, bronze medalist(s)	8	1	0	1	2
Junior totals				7	1	3	4	4
Senior totals				18	1	2	3	2
