= Viktor Luferov =

Russian singer-songwriter (1945–2010)

Viktor Arkhipovich Luferov
- Виктор Архипович Луферов
- Born: May 20, 1945; Moscow, Russian SFSR, Soviet Union (present-day Russia)
- Died: March 1, 2010 (aged 64); Moscow, Russia
- Occupation(s): Singer-songwriter, multi-instrumentalist, poet

Viktor Arkhipovich Luferov (Note: Russian: Виктор Архипович Луферов, romanized: Viktor Arkhipovich Luferov) (May 20, 1945 – March 1, 2010) was a Russian singer-songwriter, multi-instrumentalist, poet, and performer. His songs were examples of the Russian music genre author song.

== Life ==
Victor Luferov was born May 20, 1945, in Moscow. He studied at the Moscow Engineering Physics Institute and graduated from Gnessin State Musical College and Moscow Veterinary Academy. He worked as a laboratory assistant, billposter, janitor and fireman.

In the late 1960s, he founded and headed the music ensemble "Osenebri" which existed from 1967 to 1970. In February 1985, he founded the Theater of Song "Perekryostok" (The Crossroads), which nurtured and encouraged many emerging singers. It lasted until 2003 when it was closed for financial reasons. Luferov was a member of the creative association "First Circle" (which at various times included Yury Lores, Alexander Mirzayan, Vladimir Berezhkov, and Mikhail Kochetkov) and the Association of Russian Bards. He published seven CDs, four of them in the author's seven-disc anthology titled Every hunter wants to know... (Каждый охотник желает знать...).

Viktor Luferov was interested in ethnographic folklore, which reverberated in his musical creations.

He died of lymphoma on March 1, 2010, and was buried at the Florus and Laurus Church in the village of Yam in Domodedovsky District, Moscow Oblast.

== Links ==
- Facebook discussion page dedicated to Viktor Luferov
- Viktor Luferov at website of creative union ASIA
- Viktor Luferov at bards.ru
- Links to selected music albums (CD) by Luferov
- Selected MP3 records of songs by Viktor Luferov
