= Aleksei Shiyanov =

Russian footballer and official

Personal information
- Full name: Aleksei Yuryevich Shiyanov
- Date of birth: 12 March 1973 (age 53)
- Place of birth: Moscow, Russian SFSR
- Height: 1.94 m (6 ft 4 1/2 in)
- Position: Goalkeeper

Youth career
- DYuSSh-4 Timiryazevskogo RUNO Moscow

Senior career*
Years	Team	Apps	(Gls)
1990–1993	FC Asmaral Moscow	46	(0)
1993	→ FC Asmaral-d Moscow	10	(0)
1994–1995	FC Dynamo-d Moscow	62	(0)
1996	FC Energiya-Tekstilshchik Kamyshin	3	(0)
1997–1998	FC Fakel Voronezh	8	(0)
1999	FC Khimki	25	(0)
2000–2001	FC Zimbru Chișinău	0	(0)
2001	FC Metallurg Lipetsk	11	(0)
2001	FC Spartak Tambov	6	(0)
2002	FC Reutov (amateur)		
2003	FC Alla-L Lobnya (amateur)		
2004	FC Lobnya-Alla Lobnya	3	(0)
2005	FC Lokomotiv Kaluga	21	(0)
2006–2007	FC Sportakademklub Moscow	32	(0)

International career
1993	Russia U-21	1	(0)

Managerial career
- 2008–2009: FC MVD Rossii Moscow (administrator)
- 2010–2013: SSh-76 Timiryazevets Moscow (GK coach)
- 2013: SShOR-27 Sokol Moscow (deputy director)
- * Club domestic league appearances and goals

Aleksei Yuryevich Shiyanov (Russian: Алексей Юрьевич Шиянов; born 12 March 1973) is a Russian professional football official and a former player.
