= Oleg Nagornov =

Russian physicist and mathematician (born 1956)

- Born: August 15, 1956; Moscow, Russian Federation
- Education: National Research Nuclear University MEPhI (Moscow Engineering Physics Institute)

Oleg Viktorovich Nagornov (Russian: Олег Викторович Нагорнов; born 15 August 1956) is a Russian physicist and mathematician. Since 2010 he has been the first Vice-rector of National Research Nuclear University MEPhI (Moscow Engineering Physics Institute).

== Early life and career ==
Oleg Nagornov was born on August 15, 1956, in Moscow, Russia. In 1979 he graduated from MEPhI, where he studied theoretical nuclear physics. In 1979–1982 he was a post-graduate student in MEPhI. In 1983 Oleg Nagornov started his career in MEPhI as a junior research fellow, became research assistant in 1985.

== Professional experience ==
In 1988-2006 Oleg Nagornov worked as Associate Professor in MEPhI. He was a professor and the Head of the Department in MEPhI from 2007 to 2008. In 2008-2010 he served as Institute's Vice-rector. In 2010 he was appointed the first Vice-rector of MEPhI. Oleg Nagornov is a Member of the Expert Council of Higher Attestation Commission.

== Awards ==
Laureate of the following Government Awards:

- Award of the Russian Federation Government in the field of education (2013)
- Diploma of Merit, Rosatom State Corporation
- Medal "For Merit in the Conduct of the All-Russian Population Census"
- Diploma for the training of information security specialists in commemoration of the 70th anniversary of MEPhI (2012)
- Diploma of Merit, The Federal Financial Monitoring Service of the Russian Federation (2012)
- The Kurchatov Medal, IV class (2012).

== Scientific career ==
The scope of scientific interests includes inverse problems of mathematical physics, mathematical models in paleoclimatology, Numerical Modelling for Environmental Problems, heat and mass transfer and wave dispersion in porous multiphase medium.

Academic degrees:

- PhD of Science (1983)
- Doctor of Physical and Mathematical Science (2005)

== International career ==
- Visiting professor in the Polar Ice Coring Office, University of Alaska Fairbanks, US (1991-1994)
- The head of International Science and Technology Center's projects (1994–2004)
- Visiting lecturer in the Center of Theoretical Research, Facultad de Estudios Superiores Cuautitlan, UNAM, Mexico (1996, 1998–2000)
- Co-leader of the CRDF (U.S. Civilian Research and Development Foundation) project (1996–1999)
- Visiting lecturer in universities of Argentina: Master's program "Numerical Modelling for Environmental Problems", Facultad Regional de San Nicolas, National Technological University and National University of San Juan (1997–2002)
