= Yuri Ilyich Druzhnikov =

Russian writer (1933–2008)

Yuri Ilyich Druzhnikov (in Russian: Юрий Ильич Дружников) was born Yuri Izrailevich Alperovich on the 17 April 1933 in Moscow, USSR. He died on the 14 May 2008 in Davis, California.

In his lifetime, he worked as an actor, a photographer, an editor, a journalist and travel correspondent, as an author and as a professor of Russian. He was also the vice-president of the American branch of the International PEN club.

== Bibliography ==
- Informer 001: The Myth of Pavlik Morozov [Доносчик 001, или Вознесение Павлика Морозова] (1996)
- Prisoner of Russia [Узник России. По следам неизвестного Пушкина] (1998)
- Contemporary Russian Myths: A Skeptical View of the Literary Past (1999)
- Angels on the Head of a Pin [Ангелы на кончике иглы] (2002)
- Madonna from Russia [Суперженщина, или, Золотая корона для моей girl friend] (2003)
- Passport to Yesterday (2004)
