= Verkhovsky Pogost =

Rural locality in Vologda Oblast, Russia

Verkhovsky Pogost Верховский Погост
- Selo
- Location within Vologda Oblast Location within Russia
- Coordinates: 60°27′N 42°57′E
- Country: Russia
- Region: Vologda Oblast
- District: Tarnogsky District
- Time zone: UTC+3:00

Verkhovsky Pogost (Russian: Верховский Погост) is a rural locality (a selo) in Verkhovskoye Rural Settlement, Tarnogsky District, Vologda Oblast, Russia. The population was 57 as of 2002.

== Geography ==
Verkhovsky Pogost is located 40 km west of Tarnogsky Gorodok (the district's administrative centre) by road. Makarovskaya is the nearest rural locality.
