= Lazar Berenzon =

Soviet officer

- Native name: Лазарь Израилевич Берензон
- Born: Lazar Izrailevich Berenzon; 12 August 1898; Moscow, Russian Empire
- Died: 1956 (aged 57–58) Moscow, Russian SFSR, Soviet Union
- Buried: Donskoye Cemetery
- Allegiance: Soviet Union
- Branch: NKVD
- Service years: 1918–1946
- Rank: Major general
- Awards: Order of Lenin; Order of the Red Banner; Order of the Red Banner of Labour (2x); Order of the Red Star (2x); Medal "For Labour Valour"; Medal "For the Defence of Moscow"; Medal "For the Victory over Germany in the Great Patriotic War 1941–1945"; Honoured Worker of the Worker-Peasant Militia

Major-General Lazar Izrailevich Berenzon (Russian: Ла́зарь Изра́илевич Бе́рензон; 12 August 1898 – 1956) was a Soviet military commander of the Soviet security services, principally the People's Commissariat for Internal Affairs, or the NKVD. He served with the state's security organs for almost thirty years, rising to the rank of major general and overseeing the NKVD's financial affairs on major prison labour projects, including the construction of the White Sea-Baltic Canal and the Baikal–Amur Mainline. Between 1940 and 1941, he was deputy head of the entire Gulag system.

== Early life and Russian Civil War ==
Berenzon was born into a middle-class Jewish family in 1898. After graduating from junior high school, he studied at the Law Department of Moscow State University. He joined the Red Army in 1918 and served during the Russian Civil War until 1920 as a private and later platoon commander.

== NKVD career ==
From 25 April 1918, he worked as an accountant-clerk in the People's Commissariat for Internal Affairs (NKVD) of the Russian Soviet Federative Socialist Republic. From 1 June to 1 September 1919 Berenzon was the head of the Department of Finance of the NKVD, becoming an inspector of the NKVD's operational and financial issues in 1920. He rose to serve as deputy head of the NKVD's Finance Department between 1921 and 1922, while simultaneously serving as the head of the Cheka's, and then the OGPU's Finance Department from 28 July 1921 to 10 July 1934. From 27 August 1923 to December 1930, Berenzon was head of the Finance Department of the NKVD of the USSR, and on November 16, 1931, he took up the post of head of finance for the OGPU's Belbaltlag project, the system of labour camps assigned to construct the White Sea–Baltic Canal. Berenzon left this role in 1932 and was soon assigned, on 10 November 1932, to work on the financial management of another Stalinist building project, overseeing Bamlag, the system of prison and labour camps working on the construction of the Baikal–Amur Mainline. He returned to head the NKVD's Finance Department from 10 July 1934 to 9 February 1938.

Berenzon was promoted to the rank of division officer on 15 May 1936, and from 9 February 1938 to 26 February 1941 was head of the NKVD's Central Finance and Planning Department. From 19 August 1940 to 1941 he was deputy head of the NKVD's entire prison camp system, known as the Gulag. From 26 February 1941 to April 1943 Berenzon once more served as the head of the Central Finance and Planning Department. On 22 February 1943 he was promoted to Major General of the Quartermaster Service, and from April 1943 to 14 March 1946 he was head of the NKVD's Central Finance Department.

Berenzon was reduced to the reserves in 1946, and retired fully in 1948. He died in Moscow in 1956 and was buried in the Donskoye Cemetery. Over his career he had received the title of Honoured Worker of the Worker-Peasant Militia 27 February 1933; the Order of the Red Star on 4 August 1933; the Order of the Red Banner on 3 November 1944; the Order of Lenin on 20 February 1945; and the Order of the Red Banner of Labour on 23 February 1945.
