= Sergey Borisov (ice hockey) =

Russian ice hockey player

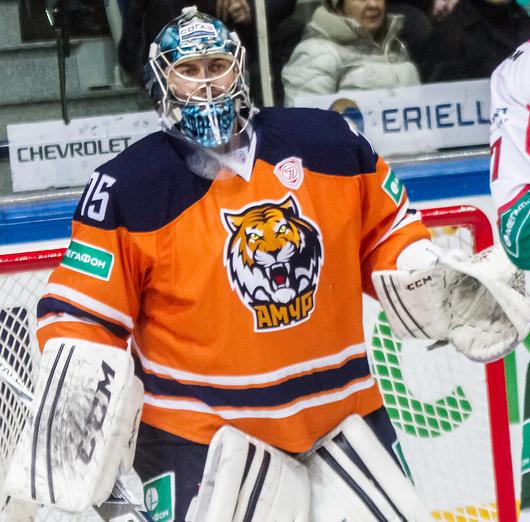
- Born: October 18, 1985 (age 39); Moscow, Russian SFSR
- Height: 6 ft 0 in (183 cm)
- Weight: 205 lb (93 kg; 14 st 9 lb)
- Position: Goaltender
- Catches: Left
- KHL team Former teams: Amur Khabarovsk; CSKA Moscow; Amur Khabarovsk; Severstal Cherepovets; Spartak Moscow; Atlant Mystischi
- Playing career: 2004–present

Sergey Borisov (born October 18, 1985) is a Russian professional ice hockey goaltender who currently plays for Amur Khabarovsk in the Kontinental Hockey League.
