= Irina Vdovets =

Irina Vdovets (born 1958 or 1959) was the only US Olympic Coach in Women's rhythmic gymnastics to serve in that role for two Olympics. She is also the founder of the Illinois Rhythmic Gymnastics Center and serves on the board of Youth Centers of Israel, part of Keren Yaldenu. Keren Yaldenu (founded in 1953 or 1954) is an organization that runs seven Jewish youth centers in Israel.

== Early life and education ==
Vdovets was born in Moscow. At the age of six, Vdovets switched from ice skating to rhythmic gymnastics. When she was 15, she earned the title of Master of Sport of the USSR. In 1978, Vdovets moved from the Soviet Union to the United States.

== Career ==
After moving to the United States, Vdovets began teaching gymnastics at a community center in Evanston, Illinois.

== Personal life ==
Vdovets is married to her husband with no kids.

== Awards and honours ==
In 2007, Vdovets was inducted into the U.S. Gymnastics Hall of Fame.
