= Vitali Lykhin =

Russian footballer

Personal information
- Full name: Vitali Konstantinovich Lykhin
- Date of birth: 4 April 1980 (age 46)
- Place of birth: Moscow, Russian SFSR
- Height: 1.73 m (5 ft 8 in)
- Position: Midfielder

Youth career
- FC Torpedo-ZIL Moscow

Senior career*
Years	Team	Apps	(Gls)
1998–2000	FC Torpedo-ZIL-M Moscow		
2000	FC Krasnoznamensk	17	(3)
2001–2003	FC Torpedo-Metallurg Moscow	15	(0)
2003–2004	FC Sodovik Sterlitamak	45	(5)
2005–2006	FC Troitsk-2001 Troitsk		
2007	FC Volga Ulyanovsk	1	(0)
2008	FC Tornado Moscow		
2009	FC Torpedo Moscow (amateur)		
- * Club domestic league appearances and goals

Vitali Konstantinovich Lykhin (Russian: Виталий Константинович Лыхин; born 4 April 1980) is a former Russian football player.
