= Evgeniy Voishvillo =

Russian painter (1907–1993)

Evgeniy Valerianovich Voishvillo (Russian: Евгений Валерианович Войшвилло; 16 October 1907 — 1993) was a Russian artist, formerly known for his works in the field of book illustration and marinistic graphics.

== Biography ==
Voishvillo was born into a family with maritime traditions. He graduated from the Art and Industrial Technical school at the Leningrad Academy of Arts, exhibited from 1930s. During the Great Patriotic War he worked in the publishing department of the Baltic Fleet, sergeant, holder of the Order of the Patriotic War, II degree. In the post-war years, he worked in a drawing bureau at the Department of Naval Geography of Naval Academy.

Voishvillo created images of historical ships, including more than 60 works in the fund of the Museum of the World Ocean in Kaliningrad, named on the official website of the museum as the pride of the collection. In 2009, 15 paintings from the collection depicting Russian sailing ships, as a traveling exhibition “In the name of marine science - under sail”, went on a trip around the world on bark "Kruzenshtern". Voishvillo noted his vast experience of successful work in the preface to his book “Odessa Goes to Sea,” illustrated by Voishvillo, a shipbuilding historian N. A. Zalessky. In 1974—1975, in collaboration with specialist shipbuilder A.L. Larionov, he completed sketches of the original historical appearance of the boat of Peter I, on the basis of which a copy of the vessel was made. He illustrated articles on naval topics in the magazines “Modeler-constructor”, “Around the World”, “Fleet” and others.

His brother, Georgy Valerianovich Voishvillo, was a major Soviet specialist in the field of tube and semiconductor electronics, professor Leningrad Electrotechnical Institute of Communications.
