= Evgeniy Abdullaev =

Russian poet, writer, and critic

- Евгений Викторович Абдуллаев
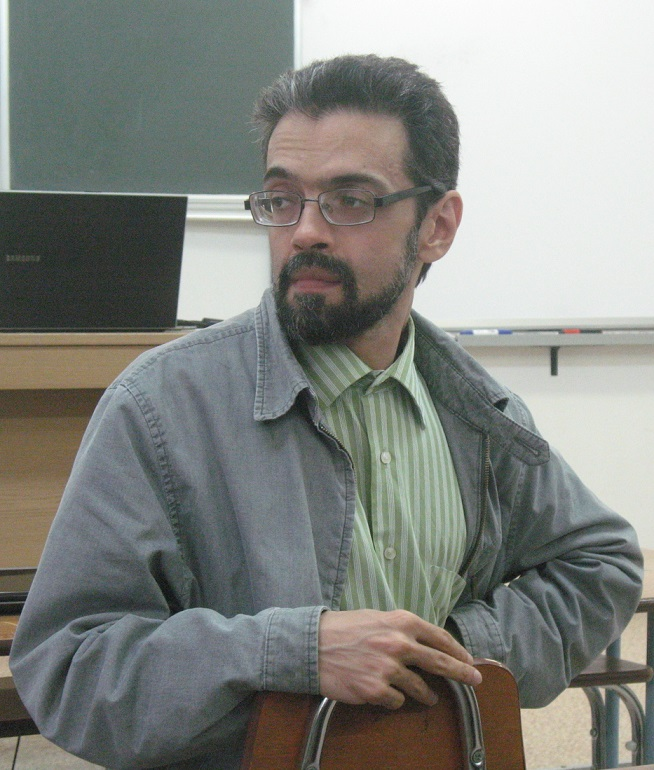
- Abdullaev in 2015
- Born: 19 April 1971 (age 55); Namangan, Uzbek SSR, Soviet Union
- Citizenship: Uzbekistan
- Education: National University of Uzbekistan
- Writing career
- Pen name: Suhbat Aflotuni
- Language: Russian
- Genres: Poem; article
- Notable awards: Triumph, Russian Prize

Evgeniy Viktorovich Abdullayev (Russian: Евгений Викторович Абдуллаев; born 19 April 1971) is an Uzbek poet, writer, and critic. He was born in Tashkent and is an ethnic Russian.

== Biography ==
Abdullayev spent his childhood in Namangan. He has been living in Tashkent since 1978. In 1993, the future writer graduated the Faculty of Philosophy of TashSU (Tashkent State University, currently known as the National University of Uzbekistan).

He publishes only critical articles under his real name, and poetic and prose works under the pseudonym Suhbat Aflotuni.

== Collected poems ==
- Psalms and sketches (2003)
- Landscape with a cut off ear (2008)

== Prosaic works ==
- Love in Tashkent, a novel (2006)
- +39 (2011)
- Adoration of the Magi, a novel (2015)
- Ant King, a novel (2016)
- Earthly Paradise, a novel (2019)
- Clay letters, floating apples, collected novellas (2020)
- A shelter for homeless cactuses (2021)
- Katechon, a novel (2024)

== Awards ==
Evgeniy Abdullaev has been the laureate of "Russian Prize" Award for writers of Russia (2005) and "Triumph" Youth Award (2006).
