= Yuri Izyumov =

Soviet Russian journalist, politician and author

- Occupation: Journalist
- Website: izyumov.ru

Yuri Petrovich Izyumov (Russian: Юрий Петрович Изюмов; December 4, 1932 in Moscow – 9 February 2021) was a Soviet and Russian journalist and author, politician. From 1970 to 1980, he was an assistant to the First Secretary of the Moscow City Committee of the Communist Party Viktor Grishin. He was a Deputy of the Mossoviet.

He graduated with honors from the Faculty of Journalism of Moscow State University.

From 1957 to 1961, he was deputy editor-in-chief of the "Moskovskij Komsomolets".

From 1980 to 1990, he was first deputy editor-in-chief of the "Literaturnaya Gazeta".

He was also deputy editor-in-chief of the "Pionerskaya Pravda" and "Vechernyaya Moskva".

Since 1990, he has served as the editor-in-chief of the newspaper Glasnost. In 1991, he joined the Communist Party of the Russian Federation (CPRF).

From 1999 to 2007, he was the editor-in-chief of the newspaper Dossier. History and Modernity, and later of the online newspaper Dossier.

He is a member of the Moscow Union of Journalists.

Honours and awards

- Honoured Cultural Worker of the RSFSR
- Order of Lenin
- Order of the October Revolution
- Order of the Red Banner of Labour
- Order of Friendship of Peoples
- Order of the Badge of Honour
- Order of Friendship (DPRK)
- Certificate of Commendation from the President of the Russian Federation
