= Yevgeni Mokhorev =

Russian photographer (born 1967)

Yevgeni Mokhorev (born 1967 in Leningrad now Saint Petersburg) is a Russian photographer. He became a professional photographer in 1986. Two years later he joined the well- known photo club "Zerkalo" or "Mirror" where he met Alexey Titarenko and other photographers that influenced him. He has participated in more than 40 events, both in Russia and abroad, including Ballet Royal: Arithmetic of the Ideal, a collaboration between Mokhorev and the Mariinsky Ballet, and is a well-known photographer in St. Petersburg.

His work has exhibited in several countries, including the US, Britain in 2009, and in early 2010 in Copenhagen. His distinctive black and white style set in urban landscapes has been said to depict "the Russian soul".
