= Sergei Krestov =

Russian footballer

Personal information
- Full name: Sergei Vladimirovich Krestov
- Date of birth: 6 October 1972
- Place of birth: Moscow, Russian SFSR
- Date of death: 23 September 2002 (aged 29)
- Place of death: Moscow, Russia
- Height: 1.85 m (6 ft 1 in)
- Position: Forward

Youth career
- FC Spartak Moscow

Senior career*
Years	Team	Apps	(Gls)
1990–1993	FC Spartak Moscow	0	(0)
1992–1993	→ FC Spartak-d Moscow	51	(6)
1994	FC Torpedo Moscow	3	(0)
1994	→ FC Torpedo-d Moscow (loan)	12	(1)
1995–1996	FC Fabus Bronnitsy	54	(3)
1997–2002	FC Mosenergo Moscow	216	(10)
- * Club domestic league appearances and goals

Sergei Vladimirovich Krestov (Russian: Сергей Владимирович Крестов; born 6 October 1972 in Moscow; died 23 September 2002 in Moscow in a car accident) was a Russian football player.
