= Kashchenko =

Kashchenko is a Ukrainian-language surname. Notable people with the surname include:

- Adrian Kashchenko (1858–1921), Ukrainian historian
- Pyotr Kashchenko, Russian psychiatrist
- Svitlana Kashchenko (born 1968), Russian-Nicaraguan sport-shooter
