= Igor Chetvertkov =

Igor Chetvertkov (Russian Игорь Четвертков) (born 1956) is a Russian painter, draftsman, and theater designer. Chetvertkov started his career as a scenographer and has created sets for 50 performances. He has participated in 100 exhibitions both in Russia and abroad. In 1977 he graduated from Moscow College of Art with a degree in drama. Having studied under A. G. Tyshler, he worked in the workshop of S. B. Benediktov.

His works are held in museums and private collections in Moscow, St Petersburg, Kyiv, Sevastopol, Vologda, and abroad—in Cyprus, France, Italy, Germany, Switzerland, England, Japan, and the United States.

== Performances ==
He started his career as a theater artist and has created art for 50 performances, including the following:

- 1977 THE SEA-GULL. Student Theater of the State Institute of Theatrical Art. Moscow
- 1978 MERY POPPINS. Theater of the Young Spectator. Nizhny Novgorod
- 1978 DON SEZAR DE BAZAN. Drama Theater. Dzerzhinsk
- 1978 DEVILRY AND LOVE. Drama Theater. Vyatka
- 1980 BON JOUR, EDITH PIAF! Drama Theater. Vladimir
- 1985 AVARICIOUS. Drama Theater. Syktyvkar
- 1986 WORKING BREAD. Folk Theater. Moscow
- 1986 ALL NADEZHDA. Drama Theater. Chita
- 1988 FEMALE TABLE IN THE HUNTING HALL. Drama Theater. Chita
- 1988 WEDDING SEASON. Drama Theater. Chita
- 1989 BLINDING DARKNESS. Theater of the Young Spectator. Tver
- 1990 AND DAY WAS... Drama Theater. Chita
- 1990 LOVE UNDER ELMS. Drama Theater. Chita
- 1991 RIGOLETTO. Theater of Opera and Ballet. Perm
- 1994 FLEA. Theater of Dolls. Vladimir
- 1998 TAIS. Theater of the Moon. Moscow

== Exhibitions ==
He has participated in 100 exhibitions in both Russia and abroad, including the following:

- 1979 National exhibition of Theater and Cinema artists. Moscow.
- 1983 International exhibition of stage design "Prague Quadriennale".
- 1987 National exhibition of Theater and Cinema artists. Moscow.
- 1989 Exhibition in Europe "Our Chekhov".
- 1990 Exhibition "Russian Gold". Los Angeles, Anchorage, USA.
- 1993 Personal exhibition at the CHA. Moscow..
- 1993 Personal exhibition in museum of History and Archeology. Khersones.
- 1993 Personal exhibition Art Museum in Sebastopol.
- 1994 Personal exhibition of Association of Artists in Vologda.
- 1994 Personal exhibition at the CHA. Moscow.
- 1994 Personal exhibition at the Palace of Arts. St. Petersburg.
- 1994 Personal exhibition at Comedy Theater in St. Petersburg.
- 1995 Personal exhibition at "Ros-Art" Gallery. St. Petersburg.
- 1996 Personal exhibition at the CHA. Moscow.
- 1996 Exhibition at "Russian Gallery" in Geneva.
- 1996 Exhibition in "Art-Manege-96" Moscow.
- 1997 Personal exhibition at the CHA. Moscow.
- 1997 Personal exhibition at RAO GAZPROM. Moscow.
- 1997 International Fair "Human-97" at the Palace of Youth. Moscow.
- 1997 Personal exhibition at the House of Friendship. Moscow.
- 1997 Exhibition in "Art-Manege-97". Moscow.
- 1998 Exhibition in "CHA-98". Moscow.
- 1998 Exhibition in "Moscow Art-Salon-98". Moscow.
- 1998 Personal exhibition in Theater of the Moon. Moscow.
- 1998 Personal exhibition at the Helicon Opera House. Moscow.
- 1998 Personal exhibition in "Art-Manege-98". Moscow.
- 1999 Personal section on exhibition "CHA-99". Moscow.
- 1999 All-Russian art exhibition. Manege. Moscow.
- 1999 Personal exhibition in Cultural Center MID, Moscow.
- 1999 Personal exhibition in Russian Cultural Center. Nicosia.
- 2000 Personal exhibition at the Academy of Diplomats MID. Moscow.
- 2000 Personal exhibition at CHA. Moscow.
- 2000 Personal exhibition at Government DUMA. Moscow.
- 2000 Personal exhibition in Russian Cultural Center. Washington.
- 2000 Personal exhibition at the Permanent Mission of Russia at the UN. New York.
- 2000 Art auction at the Hotel "Pierre". New York.
- 2000 Personal exhibition "Time of Mythology" at the InterArt Gallery. New York.
- 2001 Personal exhibition in Russian Cultural Center. Nicosia, Cyprus.
- 2001 Exhibition in Russian Cultural Center. Luxembourg.
- 2001 Personal exhibition of the World Festival of Underwater Art. Antibes, France.
- 2002 Exhibition "Acropolis" at the Museum of Architecture. Moscow.
- 2002 Personal exhibition in "Art-Manege-2002". Moscow.
- 2003 Personal exhibition in Cultural Centre MID. Moscow.
- 2003 Personal exhibition in Russian Cultural Center. Bruxelles.
- 2003 Personal exhibition in Russian Cultural Center. Luxembourg.
- 2004 Personal exhibition in Russian Cultural Center. Nicosia, Cyprus.
- 2004 Personal exhibition in "Diachroniki" Gallery. Nicosia, Cyprus.
- 2006 Exhibition in Russian Cultural Center. Valletta, Malta.
- 2006 "Russian Art" in Hotel "Coral Beach". Paphos, Cyprus.
- 2006 Personal exhibition in "Art-Manege-2006". Moscow.
- 2007 Personal exhibition in Embassy of Russia. London. England.
- 2008 Personal exhibition in Embassy of Russia. London. England.
- 2008 Personal exhibition in Pushkin House. London. England.
- 2008 Exhibition in "Alla Bulyanskaya Gallery". London. England.

== The bibliography ==
- F. Syrkina "All-Union Exhibition of Artists of Theatre and Cinematography". Magazine "Iskusstvo", No.4, 1979
- M. Pozharskaya "The Results of Moscow Theatrical Artists' Season", magazine "Theater", No.6,1979
- M. Pozharskaya "The Results of 1978-1979 Season", magazine "Theater", No.4, 1980
- M. Pozharskaya "The Basic Tendencies of Modern Theatrical and Decorative Art", p. 23-50, 1980
- N. Trifonova "The Results of 1979-1980 Season", magazine " Theater ", No.5, 1981
- G. Kovalenko "The Results of 1977-1978 season" Moscow Exhibition". "Soviet Artists of Theatre and Cinematography-79" Publishing, Moscow, 1981
- G. Kovalenko "The Results of 1978-1979 and 1979-1980 seasons" Moscow Exhibitions". "Soviet Artists of Theatre and Cinematography" Publishing, No.5, Moscow, 1983
- Catalogue of Exhibition "Qvadriennale-83 in Prague. Young Artists of the Theatre"
- S. Benediktov" Igor Chetvertkov", "Soviet Artists of Theatre and Cinematography” Publishing, No.6, Moscow, 1984
- "About Artists of Theatre, Cinematography and Television", Leningrad, "The Artist of RSFSR", 1984
- V. Beriozkin "Young Artists of the Theatre", "Soviet Artist" Publishing, Moscow, 1984
- V. Beriozkin "The Art of Staging of a Performance", p. 78. "Znanie". Moscow. 1986
- V. Beriozkin "The Artist at the Chekhov Theatre", p. 145, 116–117, "Izobrazitelnoe Iskusstvo"
- Magazine "Teatralnaya Zhizn", No.1,1986, folder
- V. Beriozkin "Nash Chekhov" (Our Chekhov "Prague Qvadriennale-87"), Moscow, 1987
- B. Messerer "The Exhibition of Moscow Artists of Theatre, Cinematography and Television", p. 67, collection "The Artist and Scene", 1988
- A. Vasiliev "The Conference of Stenographic Committee in Tokyo", p. 388, collection "The Artist and Scene", 1988
- M. Gurevich "The Theatre Begins from the Playbill", magazine "Teatr", No.12, 1988
- N. Uvarova "Under the Badge of the Theatre", p. 24-25, magazine "Teatralnaia Zhizn", No.4, 1992
- O. Kasianenko "Secrets of Shelf", paper "Vechernii Petersburg", 16.02.95
- Encyclopaedia "Creative Foundation of Russia", Moscow, 1996, p. 93
- E. Dorofeeva "Igor Chetvertkov's Ancient Cycle", magazine "Caprice", No.4,1997
- G. Kovalenko "Igor Chetvertkov". "La Scene' Moderne" (Giovanni Lista). Carre. Paris. 1997. (405,796)
- "International Cultorological Project", "Novoe Vremja" magazine, 08.03.98
- V.K. "Around The World in 365 Days", "ELLE" magazine, June 1998, p. 60
- "The Symbol of Greece", "GEO" magazine, July 1998, p. 3
- Catalogue of "CHA-99" Exhibition. Moscow. 1999
- Catalogue of "IXth All-Russian Art Exhibition". Moscow.1999
- "Multi-media mythology", "The Cyprus Weekly", Oktober 22–28, 1999
- Catalogue of "Igor Chetvertkov". "thekona ltd.", Nicosia. Cyprus. 1999
- E.Krasnoperova "Neptune 21st century " magazine, 03, 2000
- E.Vasiliev "The Light worldHellas", newspaper "Culture", 3–9.02.2000
- Anna Kuznetshova "Dipkurier newspaper "Culture"", 03.02 2000.,"Obshaja gazeta", 15 (339)
- Yelena Dolinskaja "Ancient Hellas oshila in Dipakademii", newspaper " Evening Moscow", 09.02.2000
- V.Dorofeev "Igor Chtvertkov", newspaper "Ours Izograf", #3, 03.2000
- E.Krasnoperova "Mediterranean. Through depth of waters", "Neptune 21st century" magazine, 3, 2000
- "The Antique world. Igor Chtvertkov", newspaper "Metsenat, #1, 2000, page 4
- I.Sulkin" Close contacts of a maximum degree ", newspaper "New Russian Word", New York, 30.10.2000
- " Russian artist and Cypriada ", " The Cyprus Weekly ", April 13–19, 2001
- " Excavating with paint ", " The Cyprus Weekly ", April 27-May 3, 2001
- " Cyprus Mail ", Thursday, April 19, 2001
- ""Cypriada" at the Russian centre of a science and culture ", " Cyprus Advertiser ", 29, April 14, 2001
- " Cypriada treat in Russian mosaic ", " Cyprus Mail ", April 15–21, 2002
- E.Krasnoperova "Igor Chetvertkov's mythological shelf" "Neptune 21st century " magazine, 02, 2002
- Annabelle von Broich “Mosikgemalde und griechische Steinreliefs”, newspaper “Luxemburger Wort”, 20.10.2003
- “Art in cycles”, newspaper “Cyprus mail”, March 23, 2004
- “Mosaic illusions”, newspaper «The Cyprus Weekly», March 26-April 1, 2004
- S. Aidinian “ In a circle of images of Igor Chetvertkov”, “ New village”, #2, 2005
- “Ancient Cycle of Igor Chetvertkov”, “Nasha Mebel”, #5, 2005
- E. Fiorentino “Sheer artistry from Moscow” newspaper “The Sunday Times”, Malta, May 28, 2006.
- “Washington Woman” magazine, July 2006
- A. Maslov "Self-portrait of Demiurg", the newspaper "Glory of Sevastopol", July 9, 2009, #113, Sevastopol
