= Ruslan Yarkhamov =

Russian footballer

Personal information
- Full name: Ruslan Musavirovich Yarkhamov
- Date of birth: 18 April 1988 (age 38)
- Place of birth: Moscow, Russian SFSR
- Height: 1.76 m (5 ft 9 1/2 in)
- Positions: Midfielder; defender

Youth career
- FShM-Torpedo Moscow

Senior career*
Years	Team	Apps	(Gls)
2004–2006	FC Torpedo Moscow	0	(0)
2007	FC Baltika Kaliningrad	1	(0)
2008	FC Chertanovo Moscow (amateur)		
2009	FC Nara-ShBFR Naro-Fominsk	33	(1)
2010–2012	FC Serpukhov (amateur)		
- * Club domestic league appearances and goals

Ruslan Musavirovich Yarkhamov (Russian: Руслан Мусавирович Ярхамов; born 18 April 1988) is a former Russian professional football player.

== Club career ==
He played in the Russian Football National League for FC Baltika Kaliningrad in 2007.
