= Filipp Toluzakov =

Russian ice hockey player (born 1989)

- Born: January 10, 1989 (age 36); Moscow, Russian SFSR
- Height: 6 ft 0 in (183 cm)
- Weight: 176 lb (80 kg; 12 st 8 lb)
- Position: Forward
- Shoots: Right
- VHL team Former teams: Metallurg Novokuznetsk; HC Spartak Moscow; Avtomobilist Yekaterinburg; Traktor Chelyabinsk; SKA Saint Petersburg; Dinamo Riga
- Playing career: 2010–present

Filipp Toluzakov (born January 10, 1989) is a Russian professional ice hockey player currently under contract with Metallurg Novokuznetsk of the Supreme Hockey League (VHL).

He originally played with HC Spartak Moscow in the Kontinental Hockey League during the 2010–11 KHL season.
