= HC Yugra =

Ice hockey team based in Kranty-Mansyysk, Russia

- City: Khanty-Mansiysk, Russia
- League: Supreme Hockey League
- Founded: 2006
- Home arena: Yugra Arena (capacity: 5,500)
- Colours
- General manager: Sergei Gusev
- Head coach: Eduard Zankovets
- Captain: Ivan Lekomtsev
- Affiliates: Avangard Omsk (KHL); Mamonty Yugry (MHL)
- Website: www.ugra-hc.ru

Franchise history
- Yugra Khanty-Mansiysk

Hockey Club Yugra (Russian: Хоккейный клуб Югра), is a professional ice hockey team based in Khanty-Mansiysk, Yugra, Russia. They currently play in the Supreme Hockey League, the second-highest league in Russia, and played in the Kontinental Hockey League from 2010 until 2018.

== History ==
After their first club season, Yugra was granted professional status and moved from the Vtoraya Liga into the Pervaya Liga. Their stay in the third level also lasted just one season, as Yugra won the championship for 2007-08. Another promotion followed, to the Russia's second-tier Russian Major League, where they won the league's championship in both seasons played. In 2010, Yugra was granted admission in the Kontinental Hockey League.

On March 28, 2018, KHL announced that two teams were going to drop out from the league, Yugra was one of the teams announced along with HC Lada Togliatti, Yugra was to compete in the second tiered VHL.

== Honors ==
=== Champions ===
(gold) Vysshaya Liga (3): 2009, 2010, 2021
(gold) Pervaya Liga (1): 2008

== Season-by-season KHL record ==
Note: GP = Games played, W = Wins, OTW = Overtime/shootout wins, OTL = Overtime/shootout losses, L = Losses, Pts = Points, GF = Goals for, GA = Goals against

| Season | GP | W | OTW | OTL | L | Pts | GF | GA | Finish | Top scorer | Playoffs |
| 2010–11 | 54 | 22 | 6 | 9 | 17 | 87 | 145 | 151 | 3rd, Kharlamov | Ivan Khlyntsev (29 points: 11 G, 18 A; 54 GP) | Lost in Conference Quarterfinals, 2-4 (Metallurg Magnitogorsk) |
| 2011–12 | 54 | 19 | 10 | 6 | 19 | 83 | 139 | 134 | 4th, Kharlamov | Vitali Sitnikov (29 points: 10 G, 19 A; 54 GP) | Lost in Conference Quarterfinals, 1-4 (Traktor Chelyabinsk) |
| 2012–13 | 52 | 19 | 7 | 3 | 23 | 74 | 153 | 163 | 5th, Kharlamov | Igor Skorokhodov (43 points: 27 G, 16 A; 51 GP) | Did not qualify |
| 2013–14 | 54 | 16 | 4 | 8 | 26 | 64 | 128 | 166 | 6th, Kharlamov | Mikhail Zhukov (30 points: 9 G, 21 A; 51 GP) | Did not qualify |
| 2014–15 | 60 | 14 | 7 | 8 | 31 | 64 | 134 | 176 | 7th, Kharlamov | Nikita Gusev (37 points: 21 G, 16 A; 55 GP) | Did not qualify |
| 2015–16 | 60 | 19 | 6 | 3 | 32 | 72 | 120 | 178 | 6th, Kharlamov | Igor Bortnikov (36 points: 20 G, 16 A; 60 GP) | Did not qualify |
| 2016–17 | 60 | 18 | 4 | 4 | 34 | 66 | 112 | 148 | 6th, Kharlamov | Evgeny Lapenkov (36 points: 15 G, 21 A; 56 GP) | Did not qualify |
| 2017–18 | 56 | 7 | 10 | 7 | 32 | 48 | 93 | 167 | 7th, Kharlamov | Maxim Pestushko (26 points: 7 G, 19 A; 53 GP) | Did not qualify |
