= Yevgeni Tochilin =

Russian footballer

Personal information
- Full name: Yevgeni Vyacheslavovich Tochilin
- Date of birth: 7 March 1991 (age 35)
- Place of birth: Moscow, Russian SFSR
- Height: 1.75 m (5 ft 9 in)
- Position: Midfielder

Team information
- Current team: FC Odintsovo

Youth career
- FC Spartak Moscow

Senior career*
Years	Team	Apps	(Gls)
2009	FC MVD Rossii-2 Moscow		
2010	FC Petrovka, 38 Moscow		
2010	FC Istra	3	(0)
2011	FC Sfântul Gheorghe Suruceni	14	(1)
2012–2015	FC Chayka Korolyov		
2016	FC Odintsovo		
- * Club domestic league appearances and goals

Yevgeni Vyacheslavovich Tochilin (Russian: Евгений Вячеславович Точилин; born 7 March 1991) is a former Russian professional football player.
