= Evgeny Busygin =

Russian ice hockey player (born 1987)

- Born: 9 September 1987 (age 38) Moscow, Russia
- Height: 6 ft 1 in (185 cm)
- Weight: 190 lb (86 kg; 13 st 8 lb)
- Position: Defence
- Shoots: Left
- KHL team: HC Vityaz Podolsk
- NHL draft: Undrafted
- Playing career: 2007–present

Evgeny Aleksandrovich Busygin (Russian: Евгений Александрович Бусыгин; born 9 September 1987) is a Russian professional ice hockey player who currently plays for Metallurg Novokuznetsk in the Kontinental Hockey League (KHL).
