= Valentin Kuklev =

Valentin Kuklev (born 11 April 1948, Moscow, Russia) is a Soviet and Russian underground activist, philosopher and thinker. He is a researcher of semantics, author, and television broadcaster on symbolism. He is follower of V. Nalimov. He serves as a Board member of the futurological group futura.ru. He participates in the project "Ways of energy development in Europe", together with DaimlerChrysler, "Networked Economy";' and "Terrorism in the 21st Century" (for the Federation Council of Russia).

== Career ==
In 1972, he began working on system design in CRI DIAS (Design Institute of Automated Systems) at Gosstroy USSR. He was a cofounder of the Electronic Music Studio at Scriabin Museum. The studio work established a multimedia environment and audio-visual synthesis. At the same time he established an underground group named "Context". It includes philosophers, philologists, psychologists. The group's main aim was translation and samizdat publishing of works by famous non-Soviet thinkers, which were officially prohibited. Among them are works of Carlos Castaneda, J. Lilly, Eric Berne, Friedrich Nietzsche, and Buddhist works.

From 1989 to 1991, Kuklev was the author and screenwriter of the program The Fifth Wheel Leningrad TV (1988–1993).

In 1991, he represented Russia at the Fordham University (New York) conference, "The Occult in Modern Russian and Soviet culture" from June 26–29, 1991).

In 1998, in collaboration with Arkady Rovner and Viktoria Andreeva, Kuklev wrote and published Encyclopedia. Symbols, signs, emblems. The book has five editions, with an overall circulation 28.000 copies.

From 1996 to 2002, vice president of the Russian National Innovation Fund - "Technology of the 21st century".

== Recognition ==
- First Russian Sretensky movie festival "Meeting" (2006).
- State grant holder of Russia in category: "Outstanding figures of culture and art" (2006–2008).

== Bibliography ==
- Andreeva, Kuklev, A. Rovner. Encyclopedia. Symbols, signs, posters. Publishers: Astrel, ACT, 2006 624 pages - ISBN 5-17-021672-6. ISBN 5-271-07986-4. Overall circulation - 28,000 copies.
- Vector art. Almanac, 2006. Book 3. Life as a counterpoint. Publisher: Library of the newspaper "MOL", 2006 256 pages Stories of V. Kuklev "Unjust" and "Simpleton". - S. 71–73. - ISBN 5-86676-052-5
- Arkady Rovner. "The floors of Hades." - [Moscow: "The Myth"] 1992. - 112. Poems. Afterword Valentin Kuklev.
- Bernice Glatzer Rosenthal. The Occult in Russian and Soviet Culture by (1997) Ithaca, NY: Cornell University Press, 1997. vii 468 pp. - P. 416. - ISBN 0-8014-8331-X, ISBN 978-0-8014-8331-8.
