= Anya Verkhovskaya =

Anya Verkhovskaya (a.k.a. Anya Verkhovskaya-Cohen) is a Moscow-born (circa 1969) consultant, chief operating officer, Expert Witness, and Human Rights Activist. She is the founder of Class Experts Group, LLC. and former Managing Director of DRRT. Verkhovskaya currently serves as the President of Class Experts Group, LLC.

== Background ==
Verkhovskaya fled the former Soviet Union as a teenage political refugee when she was 19 years old.

From 1994 through 2001, Verkhovskaya worked with filmmaker Steven Spielberg, heading his eastern European and middle Asian operations of the Survivors of the Shoah Visual History Foundation (currently USC Shoah Foundation Institute). Her expertise in community outreach in eastern Europe and the countries of the former Soviet Union assisted her in creating an outreach community network in more than 20 countries.

The life stories of more than 9,000 Jewish, Romani, and other Holocaust survivors and witnesses were videotaped as a result of Verkhovskaya's work.

== Career ==
=== Consultant ===
Her work with Spielberg assisted her in creating a comprehensive method of reaching out to Holocaust victims and their families for the Holocaust Victim Assets Litigation and the German Forced Labour Compensation Programme. Verkhovskaya was also a consultant to the International Commission on Holocaust Era Insurance Claims (ICHEIC) on outreach strategies, and she supervised the notification of claimants and face-to-face assistance programs in eastern Europe and the former Soviet Union.

From 1999 through 2001, Verkhovskaya served as a consultant for A.B. Data, Ltd., to provide notice of the Holocaust Victim Assets Litigation (Swiss Banks), a $1.25 billion class action settlement, to potential class members. Her efforts resulted in the notification of more than two million people, including Jews and Romanies throughout 109 countries, and translating settlements in 80 different languages.

=== Business ===
In 2001, Verkhovskaya joined A.B. Data, Ltd., and was its senior executive vice president and chief operating officer of its class action administration company, where she was involved in class action administration and notice implementation in the United States and abroad. She has provided expert testimony and affidavits concerning class action notice manageability and adequacy, class certification, settlement, and fund distribution issues in a variety of class action litigation areas, including: securities fraud, ERISA, consumer, insurance, employment, civil and human rights, environmental, and antitrust.

Verkhovskaya was also the project director for the Holocaust Era Asset Restitution Taskforce (Project HEART), a Holocaust restitution program created by the Jewish Agency for Israel and the Israeli government. Its purpose is to locate Holocaust victims and their heirs whose property was confiscated during the Holocaust and provide information to them to help them obtain restitution for that property. A.B. Data is administering the project, and Verkhovskaya is managing all aspects of it, including public relations, advertising, and maintaining a website and call center for it.

Verkhovskaya was the only female chief operating officer in the industry and was named a finalist in 2009 in both the Best Executive—Service Businesses category for The Stevie Awards for Women in Business and the Best Executive of the Year—Services category for The American Business Awards.

In 2017, she became the Managing Director of DRRT, an international law firm that focuses on class action litigation and class action claims filings. She left DRRT and in 2018, Verkhovskaya founded her own firm Class Experts Group LLC, where she currently serves as the President.

=== Film production ===
==== The Last Days ====
Verkhovskaya was the field producer and the production manager in The Last Days, a documentary feature receiving an Oscar nomination in 1998 and an Oscar win at the 1999 Academy Awards in the 'Best Documentary Feature' category, and which was nominated for an Eddie Award for 'Best Edited Documentary Film' at the American Cinema Editors Awards.

The film tells the stories of five Hungarian Jews during the Holocaust, focussing on the horrors of life in the concentration camps, but also stressing the optimism and desire to survive of the survivors themselves. Steven Spielberg served as executive producer.

==== Children From the Abyss ====
Verkhovskaya coproduced Children from the Abyss (2001), a documentary that won the 54th Annual Christopher Award in the Television & Cable category.

In Children from the Abyss, part of Broken Silence (2002), a five-documentary series produced by Steven Spielberg, Russian Holocaust survivors detail their experience of resistance, betrayal, collaborators, rescuers, bystanders, and the desire for revenge.

=== Activism ===
Verkhovskaya has served on the Advisory Committee for New Émigrés in New York City and is a founder and member of the Board of Directors of the Archive: Institute of Russian Jewish American Diaspora, New York City, Sir Martin Gilbert, Honorary Chair, a nonprofit organization founded to preserve the history and collective memory of the Jewish immigrant community from the former Soviet Union.

== Expert Witness ==
Anya Verkhovskaya has also provided expert witness testimony in numerous telephone consumer protection act cases, some of which include:

- Shamblin v. Obama for America
- Amber Goins v. Wal-Mart Stores, Inc., d/b/a Walmart and Palmer Recovery Attorneys, PLLC, f/k/a Palmer, Reifler & Associates
- Sidney Naiman v. Total Merchant Services, Inc. and Quality Merchant Services, Inc.
- Jim Youngman and Robert Allen v. A&B Insurance and Financial, Inc.
- Ken Johansen v. Santanna Natural Gas Corporation, dba Santanna Energy Services, v. Liberal United Marketing, Inc. a/k/a Liberal United Marketing C and P Inc., and Jacob T. Adigwe
- Estrellita Reyes v. BCA Financial Services, Inc.
- Abante Rooter and Plumbing, Inc., Mark Hankins, and Philip J. Charvat v. Alarm.com Incorporated, and Alarm.com Holdings, Inc.
- Thomas H. Krakauer v. Dish Network LLC.
- Diana Mey v. Frontier Communications Corporation
- In re Collecto, Inc. Telephone Consumer Protection Act (TCPA) Litigation
- In re Scottish re Group Securities Litigation
- Cordoba v. DirecTV, LLC.
- Abante Rooter & Plumbing, Inc. v. Alarm.com Inc.
- Youngman v. A&B Insurance and Financial, Inc.
- Krakauer v. Dish Network, LLC.

=== Family ===
Verkhovskaya got married while in Bulgaria working for the Survivors of the Shoah Visual History Foundation and was later divorced. She gave birth to a son in 1999, a daughter in 2002, and another son in 2005.

== Patents ==
- Patent Title: Reverse Printed Book

The patent was applied for and later abandoned. It was duplicative of existing patents.

== Recognition ==
=== Awards and nominations ===
- 2009, Stevie Awards finalist, 'Women in Business'
- 2009, Stevie Awards finalist, 'Best Executive of the Year'
- 2011, Stevie Awards winner, 'Women in Business'
- 2003, Christopher Award for co-producer for the Broken Silence (2002)
- 1999, Eddie Award Nominee, Best Edited Documentary Film: The Last Days (1998)
- 1999, Academy of Motion Picture Arts and Sciences Oscar Award Winner, Best Documentary Feature: The Last Days (1998)
- 1999, Online Film & Television Association (OFTA) Award Nominee, Best Documentary Picture: The Last Days (1998)

Stevie Awards are bulk awards that only prove that one paid for the award.
