= Alexander Denezhkin =

Russian ice hockey player

- Born: 14 October 1991 (age 34) Moscow, Russian SFSR
- Height: 5 ft 11 in (180 cm)
- Weight: 187 lb (85 kg; 13 st 5 lb)
- Position: Right wing
- Shoots: Right
- VHL team Former teams: HC Lada Togliatti; Spartak Moscow; HC Vityaz
- NHL draft: Undrafted
- Playing career: 2010–present

Alexander Alexandrovich Denezhkin (Russian: Александр Александрович Денежкин; born 14 October 1991) is a Russian professional ice hockey player. He is currently playing with HC Lada Togliatti of the Supreme Hockey League (VHL).

Denezhkin made his Kontinental Hockey League (KHL) debut playing with HC Spartak Moscow during the 2011–12 KHL season.
