= Andrei Grankin =

Russian ice hockey player

- Born: 8 January 1987 (age 38); Moscow, Russia
- Height: 5 ft 11 in (180 cm)
- Weight: 190 lb (86 kg; 13 st 8 lb)
- Position: Forward
- KHL team: HC Amur Khabarovsk
- NHL draft: Undrafted
- Playing career: 2006–present

Andrei Grankin (born 8 January 1987) is a Russian professional ice hockey player who currently under contract with HC Amur Khabarovsk of the Kontinental Hockey League (KHL).

Grankin played five games in the Russian Superleague during the 2006–07 season.
