= Sergei Kishchenko =

Russian footballer

Personal information
- Full name: Sergei Elvirovich Kishchenko
- Date of birth: 27 June 1972 (age 54)
- Place of birth: Moscow, Russian SFSR
- Height: 1.82 m (5 ft 11 1/2 in)
- Positions: Defender; midfielder

Youth career
- SDYuShOR-2 Lyublino RONO Moscow

Senior career*
Years	Team	Apps	(Gls)
1990	FC Znamya Truda Orekhovo-Zuyevo	2	(0)
1991	FC Iskra Smolensk	0	(0)
1992	FC Veres Rivne	1	(0)
1992–1993	FC Metalurh Kostiatynivka	39	(2)
1994	FC Rossiya Moscow	37	(4)
1995	FC Gekris Anapa	21	(6)
1996–1997	FC Avtomobilist Noginsk	72	(25)
1998–2007	FC Saturn Yegoryevsk	312	(39)
2008–2009	FC Znamya Truda Orekhovo-Zuyevo	60	(2)
2013	FC Master-Saturn Yegoryevsk		

Managerial career
- 2013: FC Master-Saturn Yegoryevsk
- * Club domestic league appearances and goals

Sergei Elvirovich Kishchenko (Russian: Серге́й Эльвирович Кищенко; born 27 June 1972) is a former Russian professional football player.
