= Evgeny Lapenkov =

Russian ice hockey player

- Born: August 1, 1984 (age 41) Moscow, Russian SFSR, Soviet Union
- Height: 6 ft 4 in (193 cm)
- Weight: 187 lb (85 kg; 13 st 5 lb)
- Position: Right wing
- KHL team Former teams: Free agent Metallurg Novokuznetsk; Lokomotiv Yaroslavl; Neftekhimik Nizhnekamsk; Spartak Moscow; Ak Bars Kazan; HC Ugra; Avtomobilist Yekaterinburg; HC Sochi; Traktor Chelyabinsk; Severstal Cherepovets
- Playing career: 2003–present

Evgeny Borisovich Lapenkov (Russian: Евгений Борисович Лапенков; born August 1, 1984) is a Russian professional ice hockey winger who is currently playing for HSC Csíkszereda in the Erste Liga, having last played for Severstal Cherepovets of the Kontinental Hockey League (KHL). He has previously played with HC Spartak Moscow in the 2010–11 season. During the 2014–15 season, after scoring 1 goal in 10 games with Avtomobilist Yekaterinburg, Lapenkov was traded to inaugural club, HC Sochi on October 2, 2014.

== Career statistics ==
			Regular season					Playoffs
Season	Team	League	GP	G	A	Pts	PIM	GP	G	A	Pts	PIM
1999–00	HC CSKA Moscow-2	Russia3	20	3	3	6	20	—	—	—	—	—
2000–01	HC CSKA Moscow-2	Russia3	14	3	1	4	39	—	—	—	—	—
2000–01	HC Vityaz Podolsk-2	Russia3	19	4	3	7	10	—	—	—	—	—
2001–02	HC Vityaz Podolsk	Russia2	12	2	1	3	6	3	0	0	0	2
2001–02	HC Vityaz Podolsk-2	Russia3	31	9	8	17	52	—	—	—	—	—
2002–03	HC Vityaz Podolsk	Russia2	45	9	3	12	65	—	—	—	—	—
2002–03	HC Vityaz Podolsk-2	Russia3	24	12	14	26	96	—	—	—	—	—
2003–04	Metallurg Novokuznetsk	Russia	14	1	0	1	6	—	—	—	—	—
2003–04	Metallurg Novokuznetsk-2	Russia3	27	3	10	13	14	—	—	—	—	—
2003–04	Torpedo Nizhny Novgorod-2	Russia3	1	0	0	0	2	—	—	—	—	—
2004–05	HK Dmitrov	Russia3	22	10	15	25	6	—	—	—	—	—
2004–05	Kristall Elektrostal	Russia2	13	2	3	5	4	—	—	—	—	—
2004–05	Kristall Saratov	Russia2	5	0	1	1	2	4	0	0	0	2
2005–06	Khimik Voskresensk	Russia2	51	21	23	44	130	6	2	1	3	4
2006–07	Lokomotiv Yaroslavl	Russia	35	3	9	12	26	1	0	0	0	0
2006–07	Lokomotiv Yaroslavl-2	Russia3	6	3	7	10	6	—	—	—	—	—
2007–08	Metallurg Novokuznetsk	Russia	52	7	18	25	34	—	—	—	—	—
2007–08	Metallurg Novokuznetsk-2	Russia3	2	0	6	6	2	—	—	—	—	—
2008–09	HC Neftekhimik Nizhnekamsk	KHL	54	18	13	31	45	4	0	0	0	0
2009–10	HC Neftekhimik Nizhnekamsk	KHL	43	7	22	29	16	—	—	—	—	—
2009–10	HC Spartak Moscow	KHL	11	6	2	8	2	10	3	0	3	6
2010–11	HC Spartak Moscow	KHL	39	6	6	12	22	—	—	—	—	—
2010–11	HC Neftekhimik Nizhnekamsk	KHL	6	0	4	4	12	7	1	0	1	4
2011–12	HC Neftekhimik Nizhnekamsk	KHL	17	2	5	7	18	—	—	—	—	—
2011–12	Ak Bars Kazan	KHL	5	0	0	0	0	5	1	0	1	2
2012–13	Yugra Khanty-Mansiysk	KHL	20	0	9	9	13	—	—	—	—	—
2012–13	Avtomobilist Yekaterinburg	KHL	29	1	11	12	26	—	—	—	—	—
2013–14	Metallurg Novokuznetsk	KHL	50	12	15	27	53	—	—	—	—	—
2014–15	Avtomobilist Yekaterinburg	KHL	10	1	1	2	6	—	—	—	—	—
2014–15	HC Sochi	KHL	47	14	14	28	17	—	—	—	—	—
2015–16	HC Neftekhimik Nizhnekamsk	KHL	26	1	3	4	17	—	—	—	—	—
2015–16	Yugra Khanty-Mansiysk	KHL	30	6	9	15	51	—	—	—	—	—
2016–17	Yuhra Khanty-Mansiysk	KHL	56	15	21	36	40	—	—	—	—	—
2017–18	HC Sochi	KHL	55	9	18	27	44	—	—	—	—	—
2018–19	Traktor Chelyabinsk	KHL	17	0	1	1	5	—	—	—	—	—
2018–19	Severstal Cherepovets	KHL	21	3	2	5	4	—	—	—	—	—
2019–20	Severstal Cherepovets	KHL	7	0	2	2	16	—	—	—	—	—
2021–22	Herlev Eagles	Denmark	26	4	16	20	18	—	—	—	—	—
2021–22	HSC Csíkszereda	Erste Liga	9	6	5	11	4	14	2	11	13	8
2021–22	HSC Csíkszereda	Romania	7	7	7	14	4	1	0	0	0	0
2022–23	CG Puigcerdà	Spain	9	10	13	23	2	2	0	2	2	25
KHL totals			543	101	158	259	407	26	5	0	5	12
