= Aleksei Prokudin =

Russian footballer

Personal information
- Full name: Aleksei Igorevich Prokudin
- Date of birth: 9 December 1982 (age 43)
- Place of birth: Moscow, Russian SFSR
- Height: 1.77 m (5 ft 9 1/2 in)
- Positions: Forward; midfielder

Senior career*
| Years | Team | Apps | (Gls) |
| 2000 | FC Zhemchuzhina Sochi | 2 | (0) |
| 2001 | FC Nika Moscow | 20 | (4) |
| 2002 | FC Vityaz Podolsk | 0 | (0) |
| 2002 | FC Avtomobilist Noginsk | 14 | (1) |
| 2004 | FC Izhevsk | 4 | (0) |
| 2004 | FC Uralan Elista | 7 | (0) |
| 2005 | FC Nara-Desna Naro-Fominsk | 12 | (3) |
| 2005 | FC Presnya Moscow | 8 | (2) |
| 2006 | FC Zelenograd (D4) | | |
| 2007 | FC Volochanin-Ratmir Vyshny Volochyok | 1 | (0) |
| 2008 | FC Zhemchuzhina-Sochi | 2 | (0) |
| 2008 | FC Zenit Moscow (D4) | | |
| 2009 | FC Volochanin-Ratmir Vyshny Volochyok | 5 | (0) |
- * Club domestic league appearances and goals

Aleksei Igorevich Prokudin (Russian: Алексей Игоревич Прокудин; born 9 December 1982) is a former Russian professional football player.

== Club career ==
He made his Russian Football National League debut for FC Zhemchuzhina Sochi on 8 July 2000 in a game against FC Tom Tomsk.
