= FC Oka Stupino =

Russian football club

- Full name: Football Club Oka Stupino
- Founded: 1932
- League: Russian Amateur Football League

FC Oka Stupino (Russian: «Ока» (Ступино)) is a Russian football team from Stupino. It has participated in every season of the Russian Amateur Football League since it was established after Soviet Union dissolution in 1992.

It played professionally in the third-tier Soviet Second League (called Class B at the time) from 1968 to 1970. It won its zone of the League in 1968, but was not promoted as it didn't win the subsequent qualification phases. In 1969 it was moved from the Moscow Oblast zone to the Central Russia zone where it only came in 12th place, and in 1970 it was moved yet again to the North Caucasus zone, coming in 8th.

== Team name history ==
- 1932–1934: FC Krylia Sovetov Stupino
- 1934–1938: FC Krylia Sovetov Elektrovoz (Stupino was temporarily named Elektrovoz)
- 1938–1945: FC Krylia Sovetov Stupino
- 1946–1967: FC Trud Stupino
- 1968– : FC Oka Stupino
