= 2012 Spengler Cup =

2012 Spengler Cup Davos, Switzerland
Tournament details
- Host country: Switzerland
- Venue(s): Vaillant Arena, Davos
- Dates: 26–31 December 2012
- Teams: 6

Final positions
- Champions: Team Canada (12th title)
- Runners-up: (Switzerland) HC Davos

Tournament statistics
- Games played: 11
- Goals scored: 77 (7 per game)
- Attendance: 71,544 (6,504 per game)

The 2012 Spengler Cup was held in Davos, Switzerland, from 26 December to 31 December 2012. All matches were played at HC Davos's home known as Vaillant Arena. Six competing teams were split into two groups of three. The two groups, named Torriani and Cattini, were named after legendary Swiss hockey players Richard "Bibi" Torriani and the Cattini brothers, Hans and Ferdinand.

== Teams participating ==
The list of teams that have been confirmed for the tournament are as listed:

- (Switzerland) HC Davos (host)
- Team Canada
- (Germany) Adler Mannheim
- (Switzerland) HC Fribourg-Gottéron
- (Czech Republic) HC Vítkovice Steel
- (Russia) Salavat Yulaev Ufa

The division of the six teams into two groups of three and the subsequent schedule were determined on 24 August 2012.

Due to the ongoing 2012–13 NHL lockout, some of the teams' rosters were bolstered by the presence of locked-out NHL players, with many of them joining Team Canada:

Locked Out NHL Players joining Team Canada
Player	Lockout Team	NHL team/Organization
Devan Dubnyk	None	Edmonton Oilers
Jonathan Bernier	(Germany) Heilbronner Falken	Los Angeles Kings
Cam Barker	(United States) Texas Stars (AHL)	Dallas Stars
Carlo Colaiacovo	(United States) Grand Rapids Griffins (AHL)	Detroit Red Wings
Jason Demers	(Finland) Oulun Kärpät	San Jose Sharks
Matt Duchene	(Switzerland) HC Ambri-Piotta	Colorado Avalanche
Jason Spezza	(Switzerland) Rapperswil-Jona Lakers	Ottawa Senators
Patrice Bergeron	(Switzerland) HC Lugano	Boston Bruins
Tyler Seguin	(Switzerland) EHC Biel	Boston Bruins
John Tavares	(Switzerland) SC Bern	New York Islanders
Ryan Smyth	None	Edmonton Oilers
Sam Gagner	(Austria) EC KAC	Edmonton Oilers

== Match Officials ==
Here is the list of match officials that have been confirmed for the tournament:

Referees	Linesmen
(Canada) Graham Skilliter	(Switzerland) Roger Arm
(Germany) Daniel Piechaczek	(Switzerland) Nicolas Fluri
(Czech Republic) Antonín Jeřábek	(Switzerland) Andreas Kohler
(Switzerland) Brent Reiber	(Switzerland) Joris Müller
(Switzerland) Stéphane Rochette	(Switzerland) Michaël Tscherrig

== Publications ==
For the first time, the Spengler Cup has made all of their available publications, including all matchday programmes and the event media guide, available for download on their website. The publications are available only in German.

== Group stage ==
=== Key ===
- W (regulation win) – 3 pts.
- OTW (overtime/shootout win) – 2 pts.
- OTL (overtime/shootout loss) – 1 pt.
- L (regulation loss) – 0 pts.

=== Group Torriani ===
Team	Pld	W	OTW	OTL	L	GF	GA	GD	Pts	Qualification
(Czech Republic) HC Vítkovice Steel	2	1	0	1	0	6	6	0	4	Clinched group
(Switzerland) HC Fribourg-Gottéron	2	1	0	0	1	6	3	+3	3	Quarterfinal berth
(Russia) Salavat Yulaev Ufa	2	0	1	0	1	6	9	−3	2	Quarterfinal berth

All times are local (UTC+1).

26 December 2012; 15:00	HC Fribourg-Gottéron (Switzerland)	5–1 (0–1, 2–0, 3–0)	(Russia) Salavat Yulaev Ufa	Vaillant Arena; Attendance: 6,504

Game reference

Benjamin Conz
Goalies
Iiro Tarkki
Referees:
(Germany) Daniel Piechaczek
(Canada) Graham Skilliter
Linesmen:
(Switzerland) Roger Arm
(Switzerland) Nicolas Fluri

	0–1	15:06 – Igor Mirnov (Kirill Koltsov) (PP)
Benjamin Plüss (Andrei Bykov, Julien Sprunger) – 25:20	1–1
(SH) Gregory Mauldin – 26:45	2–1
Andrei Bykov (Maxime Talbot, Patric Hörnqvist) – 49:30	3–1
Julien Sprunger (Bruno Gervais) – 53:11	4–1
(PP) Mike Knoepfli (Maxime Talbot) – 56:22	5–1

12 min
Penalties
16 min
35
Shots
32

27 December 2012; 15:00	HC Vítkovice Steel (Czech Republic)	4–5 OT (2–1, 2–2, 0–1, 0–1)	(Russia) Salavat Yulaev Ufa	Vaillant Arena; Attendance: 6,504

Game reference

Roman Málek
Goalies
Iiro Tarkki
Referees:
(Germany) Daniel Piechaczek
(Switzerland) Brent Reiber
Linesmen:
(Switzerland) Nicolas Fluri
(Switzerland) Andreas Köhler

Rudolf Huna (Vladimír Svačina, Ondřej Roman) – 06:17	1–0
Rudolf Huna (Lukáš Kucsera, Ondřej Roman) – 10:00	2–0
	2–1	14:42 – Sergei Zinovjev (Denis Khlystov, Nikita Filatov)
Ondřej Roman (Vladimír Svačina, Rudolf Huna) – 21:12	3–1
	3–2	23:56 – Igor Mirnov (Igor Musatov)
Vladimír Svačina (Roman Szturc) – 26:43	4–2
	4–3	34:09 – Sergei Zinovjev (Denis Khlystov)
	4–4	40:36 – Nikita Filatov (Denis Khlystov)
	4–5	60:12 (OT) – Kirill Koltsov (Antti Pihlström, Alexei Kaigorodov)

12 min
Penalties
6 min
25
Shots
33

28 December 2012; 15:00	HC Fribourg-Gottéron (Switzerland)	1–2 (0–1, 0–1, 1–0)	(Czech Republic) HC Vítkovice Steel	Vaillant Arena; Attendance: 6,504

Game reference

Cory Schneider
Goalies
Filip Šindelář
Referees:
(Switzerland) Stéphane Rochette
(Canada) Graham Skilliter
Linesmen:
(Switzerland) Andreas Kohler
(Switzerland) Michaël Tscherrig

	0–1	08:50 – Roman Szturc (Radim Hruška, Marek Malík)
	0–2	21:45 – Rudolf Huna
Julien Sprunger (Andrei Bykov) – 44:39	1–2

8 min
Penalties
12 min
39
Shots
17

=== Group Cattini ===
Team	Pld	W	OTW	OTL	L	GF	GA	GD	Pts	Qualification
Team Canada	2	1	0	1	0	6	2	+4	4	Clinched group
(Switzerland) HC Davos	2	1	0	0	1	6	7	−1	3	Quarterfinal berth
(Germany) Adler Mannheim	2	0	1	0	1	4	7	−3	2	Quarterfinal berth

All times are local (UTC+1).

26 December 2012; 20:15	Team Canada	1–2 OT (0–1, 0–0, 1–0, 0–1)	(Germany) Adler Mannheim	Vaillant Arena; Attendance: 6,504

Game reference

Jonathan Bernier
Goalies
Dennis Endras
Referees:
(Czech Republic) Antonín Jeřábek
(Switzerland) Stéphane Rochette
Linesmen:
(Switzerland) Andreas Köhler
(Switzerland) Joris Müller

	0–1	15:54 – Adam Mitchell (Steve Wagner, Craig MacDonald) (PP)
(PP) Tyler Seguin (Patrice Bergeron, Byron Ritchie) – 50:30	1–1
	1–2	63:00 (OT) – Jason Pominville (Steve Wagner)

10 min
Penalties
12 min
52
Shots
17

27 December 2012; 20:15	HC Davos (Switzerland)	0–5 (0–2, 0–2, 0–1)	Team Canada	Vaillant Arena; Attendance: 6,504

Game reference

Reto Berra
Goalies
Devan Dubnyk
Referees:
(Canada) Graham Skilliter
(Czech Republic) Antonín Jeřábek
Linesmen:
(Switzerland) Roger Arm
(Switzerland) Michaël Tscherrig

0–1	09:16 – John Tavares (Jason Spezza, Sam Gagner) (PP)
0–2	10:01 – Ryan Smyth (Jason Williams, Tyler Seguin)
0–3	25:02 – Byron Ritchie (Geoff Kinrade, Josh Holden) (SH)
0–4	32:23 – Byron Ritchie (Travis Roche) (PP)
0–5	54:01 – Jason Williams (Matt Duchene)

16 min
Penalties
10 min
21
Shots
48

28 December 2012; 20:15	Adler Mannheim (Germany)	2–6 (1–0, 1–3, 0–3)	(Switzerland) HC Davos	Vaillant Arena; Attendance: 6020

http://www.spenglercup.ch/tl_files/images/A_OnSite/Dec28/IHM001C06_74_3_0.pdf

Dennis Endras
Goalies
Leonardo Genoni
Referees:
(Czech Republic) Antonín Jeřábek
(Switzerland) Brent Reiber
Linesmen:
(Switzerland) Roger Arm
(Switzerland) Joris Müller

Dennis Seidenberg – 03:18	1–0
Florian Kettemer (Mike Glumac) – 23:11	2–0
	2–1	24:15 – Enzo Corvi (Joe Thornton)
	2–2	28:45 – Dino Wieser (René Back, Janick Steinmann) (PP)
	2–3	31:14 – Dino Wieser
	2–4	40:54 – Loui Eriksson (Petr Tatíček, Petr Sýkora)
	2–5	48:28 – Gregory Hofmann (Petr Sýkora, Beat Forster)
	2–6	50:07 – Santeri Alatalo (Joe Thornton)

2 min
Penalties
2 min
34
Shots
34

== Knockout stage ==
Quarterfinals
A2	(Switzerland) HC Fribourg-Gottéron	5
B3	(Germany) Adler Mannheim	2
B2	(Switzerland) HC Davos	7
A3	(Russia) Salavat Yulaev Ufa	5

Semifinals
B1	Team Canada	5
QF1	(Switzerland) HC Fribourg-Gottéron	1
A1	(Czech Republic) HC Vítkovice Steel	4
QF2	(Switzerland) HC Davos	5

Final
SF1	Team Canada	7
SF2	(Switzerland) HC Davos	2

Key: * – final in overtime. ** – final in shootout.

=== Quarterfinals ===
All times are local (UTC+1).

29 December 2012; 15:00	HC Fribourg-Gottéron (Switzerland)	5–2 (1–0, 2–1, 2–1)	(Germany) Adler Mannheim	Vaillant Arena; Attendance: 6,504

Game reference

Benjamin Conz
Goalies
Felix Bruckmann
Referees:
(Switzerland) Brent Reiber
(Switzerland) Stéphane Rochette
Linesmen:
(Switzerland) Roger Arm
(Switzerland) Joris Müller

(SH) Gregory Mauldin – 02:57	1–0
(PP) Benjamin Plüss (Andrei Bykov, Julien Sprunger) – 21:03	2–0
	2–1	29:18 – Frank Mauer (Yanick Lehoux, Marcus Kink)
Maxime Talbot (Gregory Mauldin, David Desharnais) – 34:50	3–1
	3–2	45:29 – Matthias Plachta (Marc El-Sayed, Steve Wagner)
(PP) Christian Dubé (David Desharnais, Patric Hörnqvist) – 49:07	4–2
Julien Sprunger (Andrei Bykov) – 56:04	5–2

4 min
Penalties
6 min
26
Shots
24

29 December 2012; 20:15	HC Davos (Switzerland)	7–5 (5–1, 2–2, 0–2)	(Russia) Salavat Yulaev Ufa	Vaillant Arena; Attendance: 6,504

Game reference

Leonardo Genoni
Goalies
Iiro Tarkki (9:28, 2nd)
Vadim Tarasov (15:09, 1st)
Referees:
(Czech Republic) Antonín Jeřábek
(Germany) Daniel Piechaczek
Linesmen:
(Switzerland) Nicolas Fluri
(Switzerland) Michaël Tscherrig

Josef Marha (Dario Bürgler) – 02:02	1–0
	1–1	02:10 – Igor Musatov (Vitali Shulakov, Vitali Atyushov)
Loui Eriksson – 03:24	2–1
Joe Thornton (Dario Bürgler) – 06:57	3–1
Santeri Alatalo – 15:09	4–1
(PP) Petr Sýkora – 16:29	5–1
	5–2	20:58 – Alexander Svitov (Denis Parshin)
	5–3	26:08 – Denis Parshin (Alexander Pankov, Alexander Svitov) (PP)
(PP) – Patrick Kane (Petr Tatíček, Santeri Alatalo) – 26:58	6–3
Patrick Kane (Loui Eriksson) – 29:28	7–3
	7–4	45:30 – Antti Pihlström (Igor Mirnov) (PP)
	7–5	53:28 – Igor Mirnov (Kirill Koltsov) (PP)

18 min
Penalties
18 min
32
Shots
33

=== Semifinals ===
All times are local (UTC+1).

30 December 2012; 15:00	Team Canada	5–1 (1–0, 2–1, 2–0)	(Switzerland) HC Fribourg-Gottéron	Vaillant Arena; Attendance: 6,504

Game reference

Devan Dubnyk
Goalies
Cory Schneider
Benjamin Conz (11:08, 3rd)
Referees:
(Germany) Daniel Piechaczek
(Switzerland) Stéphane Rochette
Linesmen:
(Switzerland) Nicolas Fluri
(Switzerland) Michaël Tscherrig

(PP) Jason Spezza (Carlo Colaiacovo, John Tavares) – 16:32	1–0
Marc-Antoine Pouliot (Byron Ritchie, Micki Dupont) – 22:47	2–0
(SH) Matt Duchene – 36:05	3–0
	3–1	36:29 – Joel Kwiatkowski (David Desharnais, Patric Hörnqvist) (PP)
Carlo Colaiacovo (Matt Duchene) – 46:25	4–1
Matt Duchene (Jason Williams) – 54:34	5–1

26 min
Penalties
10 min
33
Shots
26

30 December 2012; 20:15	HC Vítkovice Steel (Czech Republic)	4–5 (0–1, 2–2, 2–2)	(Switzerland) HC Davos	Vaillant Arena; Attendance: 6,504

Game reference

Filip Šindelář
Goalies
Reto Berra
Referees:
(Switzerland) Brent Reiber
(Canada) Graham Skilliter
Linesmen:
(Switzerland) Andreas Köhler
(Switzerland) Joris Müller

	0–1	11:48 – Patrick Kane
Lukáš Klimek (Jiří Burger) – 27:31	1–1
	1–2	31:45 – Gregory Hofmann (Petr Sýkora, Reto von Arx)
Tomáš Kudělka (Karol Sloboda) – 31:09	2–2
	2–3	36:02 – Dario Bürgler (Josef Marha)
Roman Szturc (Nathan Walker, Radim Hruška) – 42:42	3–3
	3–4	46:28 – Joe Thornton (Petr Tatíček)
Vladimír Svačina (Ondřej Roman) – 54:37	4–4
	4–5	59:48 – Patrick Kane (Matthias Joggi)

4 min
Penalties
4 min
40
Shots
35

=== Final ===
All times are local (UTC+1).

31 December 2012; 12:00	Team Canada	7–2 (3–1, 2–0, 2–1)	(Switzerland) HC Davos	Vaillant Arena; Attendance: 6,504

Game reference

Devan Dubnyk
Goalies
Leonardo Genoni
Reto Berra (10:24, 2nd)
Referees:
(Germany) Daniel Piechaczek
(Czech Republic) Antonín Jeřábek
Linesmen:
(Switzerland) Nicolas Fluri
(Switzerland) Joris Müller

Patrice Bergeron (Sam Gagner) – 00:46	1–0
(PP) Derrick Walser (Jason Demers, Patrice Bergeron) – 03:14	2–0
(SH) Ryan Smyth (Patrice Bergeron) – 09:07	3–0
	3–1	17:19 – Dario Bürgler (Joe Thornton, Noah Schneeberger)
Ryan Smyth (Patrice Bergeron, Micki Dupont) – 21:34	4–1
(PP) John Tavares (Derrick Walser, Sam Gagner) – 30:24	5–1
Jason Spezza – 40:24	6–1
(SH) John Tavares (Jason Spezza) – 49:36	7–1
	7–2	57:29 – Raphael Diaz (Patrick Kane)

12 min
Penalties
14 min
39
Shots
30

== Champions ==
2012 Spengler Cup winners

Team Canada
Twelfth title

== All-Star Team ==
Position	Player	Nationality	Team
Goaltender	Dennis Endras	German	Adler Mannheim
Right Defender	Santeri Alatalo	Finnish	HC Davos
Left Defender	Dennis Seidenberg	German	Adler Mannheim
Right Wing	Patrick Kane	American	HC Davos
Center	Matt Duchene	Canadian	Team Canada
Left Wing	Julien Sprunger	Swiss	HC Fribourg-Gotteron

== Statistics ==
=== Scoring leaders ===
Player	Team	GP	G	A	Pts
Julien Sprunger	HC Fribourg-Gottéron	4	3	2	5
Patrice Bergeron	Team Canada	4	1	4	5
Andrei Bykov	HC Fribourg-Gottéron	4	1	4	5
Patrick Kane	HC Davos	5	4	1	5
Joe Thornton	HC Davos	5	2	3	5

GP = Games Played G = Goals; A = Assists; Pts = Points

== Television ==
Several television channels around the world will cover many or all matches of the Spengler Cup. As well as most Swiss channels, here is a listing of who else covered the tournament:

- Schweizer Radio und Fernsehen (Switzerland, host broadcaster)
- The Sports Network (Canada)
- Eurosport 2, British Eurosport, Eurosport Asia and Pacific, and Eurosport HD
- Nova Sport (Czech Republic, Slovakia)
