= Devan Dubnyk =

Canadian ice hockey player (born 1986)

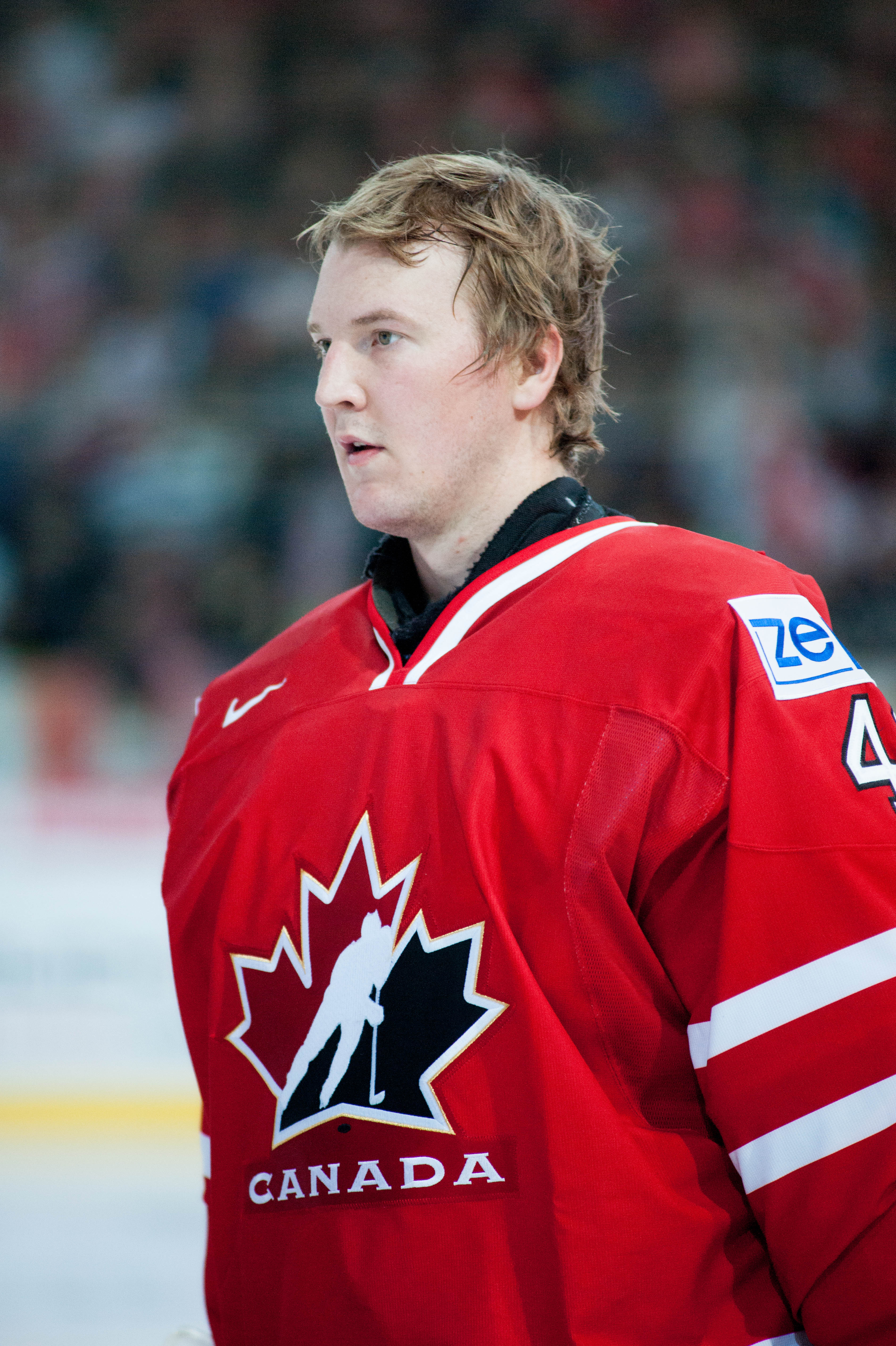
- Dubnyk with Canada during the 2012 IIHF World Championship
- Born: May 4, 1986 (age 40) Regina, Saskatchewan, Canada
- Height: 6 ft 6 in (198 cm)
- Weight: 224 lb (102 kg; 16 st 0 lb)
- Position: Goaltender
- Caught: Left
- Played for: Edmonton Oilers; Nashville Predators; Arizona Coyotes; Minnesota Wild; San Jose Sharks; Colorado Avalanche
- National team: Canada
- NHL draft: 14th overall, 2004; Edmonton Oilers
- Playing career: 2006–2022

Devan Dubnyk (born May 4, 1986) is a Canadian former professional ice hockey goaltender who played in the National Hockey League (NHL). He was originally drafted by the Edmonton Oilers in the first round, 14th overall, of the 2004 NHL entry draft.

A native of Regina, Saskatchewan, Dubnyk also played with the Nashville Predators and Arizona Coyotes before landing with the Minnesota Wild, with whom he enjoyed the most successful seasons of his NHL career. He also played for the San Jose Sharks and Colorado Avalanche.

== Playing career ==
=== Amateur ===
Dubnyk spent his junior career with the Kamloops Blazers of the Western Hockey League (WHL). Between 2001 and 2006, he played in 192 games for the Blazers, compiling an 83–87–14 record, 2.70 goals against average (GAA), .911 save percentage and 15 shutouts. At the conclusion of the 2003–04 season, the Canadian Hockey League (CHL) named Dubnyk the CHL Scholastic Player of the Year as the CHL player "best able to combine success on the ice and in school."

During the 2004 off-season, Dubnyk was drafted by the Edmonton Oilers in the first round, 14th overall, at the 2004 NHL entry draft.

=== Professional ===
==== Edmonton Oilers (2009–2014) ====
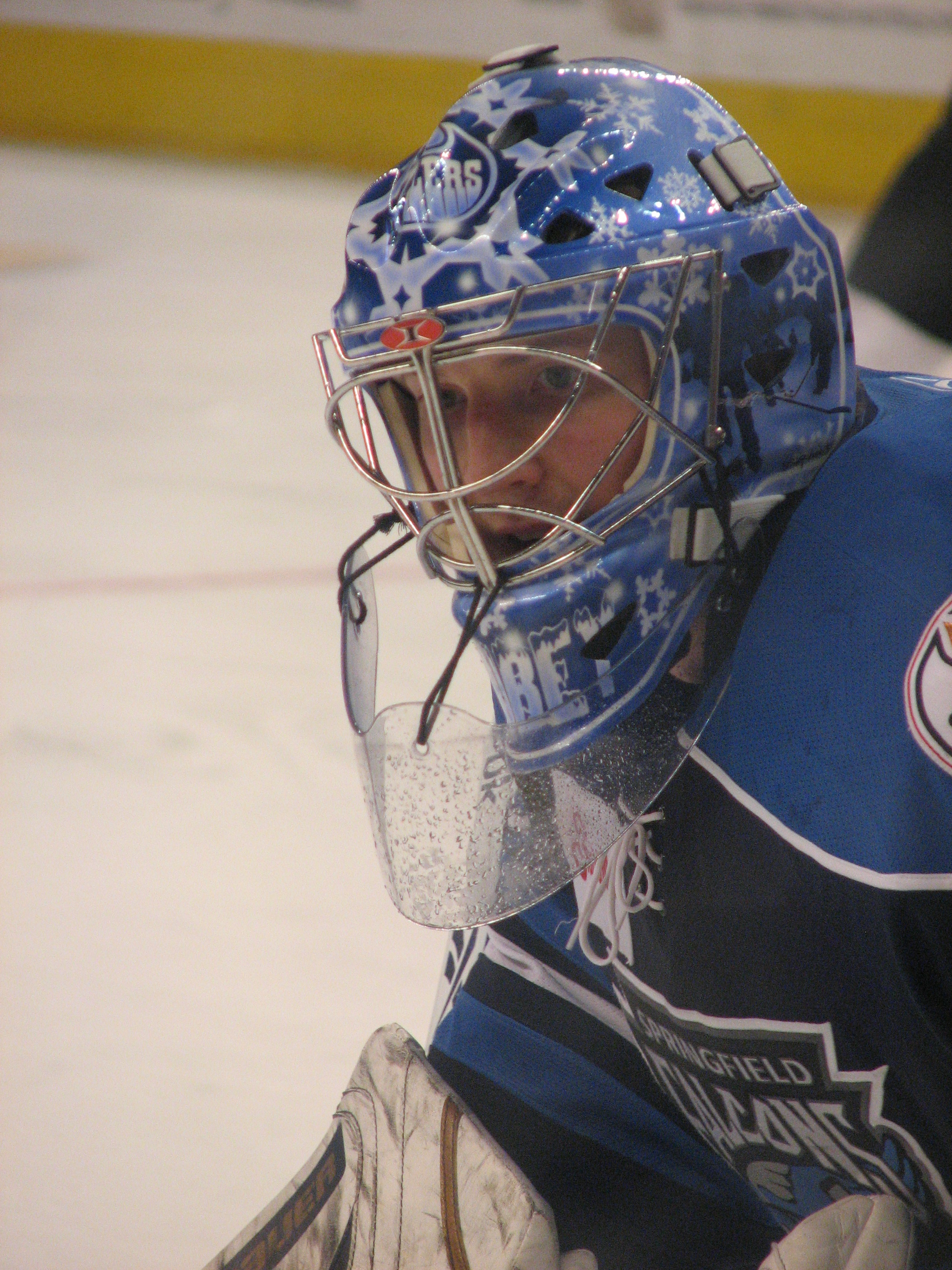
Dubnyk while playing for the Springfield Falcons.

Dubnyk began his professional career in 2006 with the Stockton Thunder of the ECHL where he compiled a strong 24–11–7 record. His 24 wins, 2.56 GAA and .921 save percentage set club records and he was selected to be an ECHL All-Star for the 2006–07 season. In 2007–08, he began to play full-time for what was then Edmonton's American Hockey League (AHL) affiliate, the Springfield Falcons. In three seasons with the Falcons, Dubnyk played 128 games, compiling a 40–75–4 record. In 2008–09, Dubnyk set a club record for most appearances by a goaltender with 62.

Dubnyk was called up by Edmonton early in the 2009–10 season after Oilers starting goaltender Nikolai Khabibulin underwent season-ending back surgery. For the remainder of the season, he served as the team's back-up to Jeff Deslauriers. Dubnyk made his first NHL appearance on November 28, 2009, replacing Deslauriers in a 7–3 loss to the Vancouver Canucks, allowing three goals on 24 shots. He recorded his first career NHL win on March 19, 2010, via a shootout with the Detroit Red Wings; Dubnyk made 31 saves in the win. On March 21, Dubnyk recorded the first regulation win of his career, making 27 saves in a 5–1 victory over the San Jose Sharks. On July 13, 2010, Edmonton re-signed Dubnyk to a two-year contract.

The 2010–11 season was Dubnyk's first full season in the NHL, beginning the year as Nikolai Khabibulin's backup. Injuries to Khabibulin, however, combined with strong play from Dubnyk, resulted in the latter registering over 30 starts for the Oilers. Dubnyk ultimately finished the season with a 12–13–8 record for a last-place Oilers squad, impressing the Oilers coaching staff. Then-Edmonton Head Coach Tom Renney summed up Dubnyk's season: "As much as we had an idea of how much we wanted to play him, we've played him more, and he's made the best of it." On February 7, 2011, Dubnyk earned his first career shutout after stopping 37 shots in a 4–0 win against the Nashville Predators. He closed out his season by earning back-to-back wins against the Presidents' Trophy-winning Vancouver Canucks, stopping 46 of 47 shots against in the process.

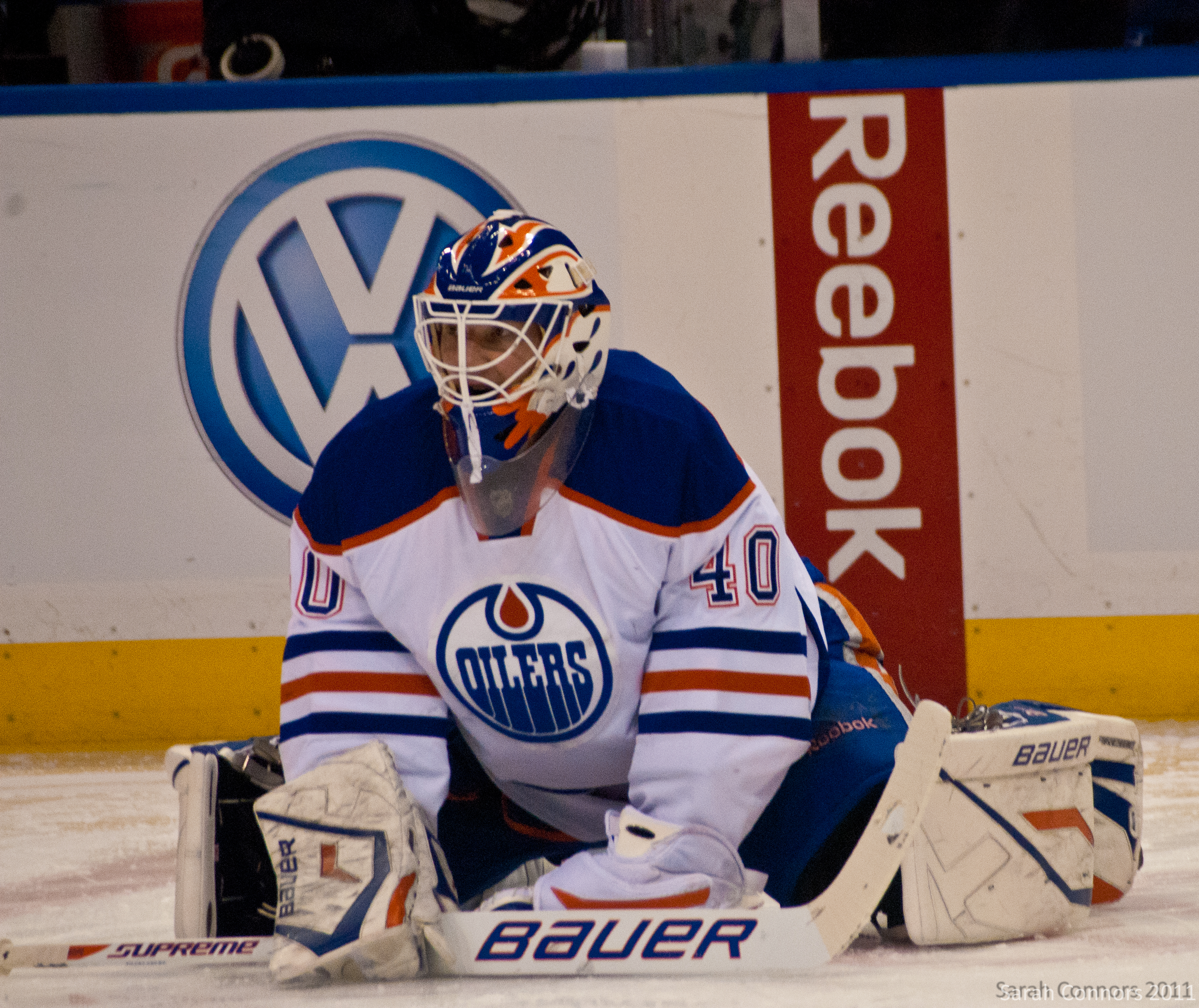
Dubnyk with the Oilers in January 2012

On October 9, 2011, Dubnyk started his first career season opener, defeating the Pittsburgh Penguins 2–1 in the shootout while stopping 35 shots in the process. Dubnyk, however, struggled at the beginning of the 2011–12 season, recording four wins in his first 13 games along with a 3.03 GAA and a 0.902 save percentage, allowing Nikolai Khabibulin to temporarily reclaim the starter's role. As Khabibulin began to struggle, however, Dubnyk reclaimed a large portion of Edmonton's starting opportunities, finishing with a strong second half to the season. Dubnyk earned his chance to be the starting goaltender in March 2012, posting a 6–2–1 record with a 1.95 GAA and a .934 save percentage and starting 12 of the Oilers' final 13 games. At that point, he had not surrendered more than three goals in 20-straight games, and also won 16 of the Oilers' final 17 games. During the subsequent off-season, on July 6, Dubnyk signed a two-year, $7 million contract extension with Edmonton.

In the 48-game, shortened 2012–13 season, Dubnyk, for the first time in his career, opened the year as the Oilers' starting goaltender. The Oilers ultimately finished 12th in the Western Conference, missing the Stanley Cup playoffs for the seventh consecutive year. Dubnyk, however, enjoyed relative success, ending the season with a 2.57 GAA and a .920 save percentage in 14 wins and 22 losses, his then-best career NHL statistics, sufficient to earn him a second year to be a starter.

Despite the previous season's personal success, Dubnyk struggled to begin the 2013–14 season, and faced a threat to his starting job by newly signed veteran Ilya Bryzgalov. Bryzgalov, however, was injured in just his third game for the Oilers, temporarily solidifying Dubnyk as Edmonton's starter.

==== Nashville Predators and Arizona Coyotes (2014–2015) ====
On January 15, 2014, Edmonton traded Dubnyk to the Nashville Predators in exchange for forward Matt Hendricks. After starting in only two games as a Predator, Dubnyk was sent to the AHL's Milwaukee Admirals on March 3 to accommodate goaltender Pekka Rinne's return from long-term injured reserve. Two days later, on March 5, Dubnyk was again traded, this time to the Montreal Canadiens in exchange for future considerations from Nashville. He was then immediately assigned to Montreal's AHL affiliate, the Hamilton Bulldogs, failing to make an appearance for Montreal.

On July 1, 2014, as an unrestricted free agent, Dubnyk signed a one-year deal with the Arizona Coyotes. He recorded a 9–5–2 record with the Coyotes, crediting Arizona Goaltending Coach Sean Burke for helping him regain his confidence and form in goal.

==== Minnesota Wild (2015–2020) ====
In the midst of a return to form in the 2014–15 season as Mike Smith's backup with the Coyotes, on January 15, 2015, Dubnyk was traded from struggling Arizona to the Minnesota Wild in exchange for a third-round draft pick in the 2015 NHL entry draft. Dubnyk immediately became Minnesota's starter. Minnesota was eight points out of a 2015 playoff spot when Dubnyk made his Wild debut, a shutout victory over the Buffalo Sabres. He would soon set a Minnesota franchise record with 38-straight starts following his acquisition, posting a 27–9–2 with a 1.78 GAA, .936 save percentage and five shutouts. He also was the winning goaltender in 11 of the Wild's 12 consecutive road wins, from February 18 to April 9, that tied the 2005–06 Detroit Red Wings for the longest such run in League history. Dubnyk and the Wild ultimately clinched a playoff berth, and on April 20, Dubnyk recorded his first career playoff shutout, blanking the St. Louis Blues in a 3–0 Wild victory in the Western Conference Quarterfinals. On April 24, Dubnyk was shortlisted as a finalist for the Vezina Trophy, along with Montreal's Carey Price and Nashville's Pekka Rinne for goaltender of the year honours.

At the NHL Awards Show on June 24, 2015, Dubnyk was awarded the Bill Masterton Trophy for helping lead the Wild to the playoffs while simultaneously resurrecting his career. He also finished third in Vezina Trophy voting and fourth in Hart Memorial Trophy voting, the latter as League MVP. While he was named in the NHL second All-Star team.

On July 4, 2015, Dubnyk, as an unrestricted free agent, opted to remain with the Wild, signing a six-year, $26 million contract at an average annual value of $4.33 million. The terms of the deal were initially agreed-upon on June 26, just prior to his free agent status came into effect on July 1. Dubnyk's high level of play continued, and he was named to his first NHL All-Star Game in January 2016. During the 2019–20 season, Dubnyk struggled and lost the starting goaltending job to long time backup and Minnesota native Alex Stalock.

==== San Jose Sharks and Colorado Avalanche (2020–2021) ====
On October 5, 2020, after a down season with the Wild, Dubnyk was traded to the San Jose Sharks, along with a 2022 seventh-round pick and 50% salary retention, in exchange for a 2022 fifth-round pick. In the pandemic delayed 2020–21 season, his debut came on January 18, 2021, in a 5–4 loss to the St. Louis Blues. His first win was on February 20, in a 5–4 win over the Blues. In 17 appearances with the struggling Sharks, Dubnyk collected just 3 wins, posting a 3.18 goals against average and .898 save percentage.

On April 10, 2021, Dubnyk was traded by the Sharks to add depth to the contending Colorado Avalanche in exchange for Greg Pateryn and a fifth-round pick in the 2021 NHL entry draft.

As an unsigned free agent over the summer from the Avalanche, and into the commencement of the 2021–22 season, Dubnyk signed a professional tryout contract in the AHL, with the Charlotte Checkers, the primary affiliate to the Florida Panthers on December 7, 2021. In his first appearance in the AHL since 2014, Dubnyk registered two wins through four starts before he was released from his tryout on January 19, 2022.

On October 29, 2022, Dubnyk announced his retirement.

== International play ==
Medal record

Ice hockey

Representing Canada

World Junior Championships
Gold medal – first place	2006 Canada	

Spengler Cup
Gold medal – first place	2012 Davos	

Dubnyk was a member of Team Canada at the 2006 World Junior Championships in Vancouver, though he did not see any action behind starter Justin Pogge, who backstopped Canada to the gold medal.

Four years later, Dubnyk was named to the Canadian senior roster for the 2010 IIHF World Championship, though he also did not see any action in the tournament.

At the conclusion of the 2010–11 season, Dubnyk was named to the Canadian roster for the 2011 IIHF World Championship in Slovakia. He appeared in only one game for Canada, stopping all eight shots he faced in limited action against France.

Shortly after finishing his season with the Oilers in 2011–12, Dubnyk again was named to Canada's roster for the 2012 IIHF World Championship in Finland and Sweden. Serving as a backup to Cam Ward, he made his tournament debut against France, stopping 19 saves of 21 shots in a 7–2 victory. Five days later, he made his second appearance in the tournament, against Kazakhstan, earning a shutout in an 8–0 victory. This was his final appearance in the tournament, as in the next game, starter Cam Ward and Canada were defeated by Slovakia in the tournament quarterfinal.

During the 2012–13 NHL lockout, Dubnyk was named to participate in the 2012 Spengler Cup in Davos, Switzerland. Along with fellow NHL goaltender Jonathan Bernier, Dubnyk shared net duties during the tournament's round-robin stage. After an overtime loss to German club Adler Mannheim in Canada's tournament debut, Dubnyk started the next match against HC Davos, stopping all 25 shots en route to a 5–0 win, and a spot in the tournament semi-finals. Later, Dubnyk would face HC Fribourg-Gottéron in the semi-finals, saving 25 of 26 shots in 5–1 Canadian victory. In the tournament final, Dubnyk once again got the call, starting against HC Davos in a 7–2 victory. Dubnyk's made 28 saves from 30 shots as Canada won gold.

== Records ==
=== Minnesota Wild ===
- Most wins in a season: 40 (2016–17)

== Career statistics ==
=== Regular season and playoffs ===
Bold indicates led league

			Regular season									Playoffs
Season	Team	League	GP	W	L	T/OT	MIN	GA	SO	GAA	SV%	GP	W	L	MIN	GA	SO	GAA	SV%
2001–02	Kamloops Blazers	WHL	3	1	1	0	143	13	0	5.45	.838	—	—	—	—	—	—	—	—
2002–03	Kamloops Blazers	WHL	26	12	8	1	1,279	66	2	3.10	.907	—	—	—	—	—	—	—	—
2003–04	Kamloops Blazers	WHL	44	20	18	5	2,533	106	6	2.51	.917	4	1	3	245	12	0	2.94	.874
2004–05	Kamloops Blazers	WHL	65	23	34	7	3,699	166	6	2.69	.912	6	2	4	363	22	0	3.64	.886
2005–06	Kamloops Blazers	WHL	54	27	26	1	3,207	136	1	2.54	.912	—	—	—	—	—	—	—	—
2006–07	Stockton Thunder	ECHL	43	24	11	7	2,529	108	2	2.56	.921	6	2	4	395	18	0	2.73	.913
2006–07	Wilkes-Barre/Scranton Penguins	AHL	4	2	1	0	204	10	0	2.94	.855	—	—	—	—	—	—	—	—
2007–08	Springfield Falcons	AHL	33	9	17	0	1772	92	0	3.12	.904	—	—	—	—	—	—	—	—
2008–09	Springfield Falcons	AHL	62	18	41	2	3,635	180	3	2.97	.906	—	—	—	—	—	—	—	—
2009–10	Springfield Falcons	AHL	33	13	17	2	1,985	100	0	3.02	.915	—	—	—	—	—	—	—	—
2009–10	Edmonton Oilers	NHL	19	4	10	2	1,075	64	0	3.57	.889	—	—	—	—	—	—	—	—
2010–11	Edmonton Oilers	NHL	35	12	13	8	2,061	93	2	2.71	.916	—	—	—	—	—	—	—	—
2011–12	Edmonton Oilers	NHL	47	20	20	3	2,653	118	2	2.67	.914	—	—	—	—	—	—	—	—
2012–13	Edmonton Oilers	NHL	38	14	16	6	2,101	90	2	2.57	.920	—	—	—	—	—	—	—	—
2013–14	Edmonton Oilers	NHL	32	11	17	2	1,678	94	2	3.36	.894	—	—	—	—	—	—	—	—
2013–14	Nashville Predators	NHL	2	0	1	1	124	9	0	4.35	.850	—	—	—	—	—	—	—	—
2013–14	Hamilton Bulldogs	AHL	8	2	5	1	415	23	2	3.33	.893	—	—	—	—	—	—	—	—
2014–15	Arizona Coyotes	NHL	19	9	5	2	1,035	47	1	2.72	.916	—	—	—	—	—	—	—	—
2014–15	Minnesota Wild	NHL	39	27	9	2	2,293	68	6	1.78	.936	10	4	6	570	24	1	2.53	.908
2015–16	Minnesota Wild	NHL	67	32	26	6	3,862	150	5	2.33	.918	6	2	4	359	20	0	3.34	.877
2016–17	Minnesota Wild	NHL	65	40	19	5	3,758	141	5	2.25	.923	5	1	4	323	10	1	1.86	.925
2017–18	Minnesota Wild	NHL	60	35	16	7	3,451	145	5	2.52	.918	5	1	4	248	14	0	3.39	.908
2018–19	Minnesota Wild	NHL	**67**	31	**28**	6	3,856	163	2	2.54	.913	—	—	—	—	—	—	—	—
2019–20	Minnesota Wild	NHL	30	12	15	2	1,665	93	1	3.35	.890	—	—	—	—	—	—	—	—
2020–21	San Jose Sharks	NHL	17	3	9	2	888	47	1	3.18	.898	—	—	—	—	—	—	—	—
2020–21	Colorado Avalanche	NHL	5	3	2	0	295	16	0	3.26	.886	—	—	—	—	—	—	—	—
2021–22	Charlotte Checkers	AHL	4	2	2	0	236	14	0	3.55	.869	—	—	—	—	—	—	—	—
NHL totals			542	253	206	54	30,793	1,338	33	2.61	.914	26	8	18	1,500	68	2	2.72	.904

=== International ===
Year	Team	Event	GP	W	L	T	MIN	GA	SO	GAA	SV%
2004	Canada	U18	6	3	3	0	357	12	1	2.02	—
2011	Canada	WC	1	0	0	0	14	0	0	0.00	1.000
2012	Canada	WC	2	2	0	0	120	2	1	1.00	.956
2013	Canada	WC	4	4	0	0	242	6	0	1.48	.913
Junior totals			6	3	3	0	357	12	1	2.02	—
Senior totals			7	6	0	0	376	8	1	1.28	.935

== Awards and honors ==
Award	Year
WHL
CHL Top Prospects Game	2004
CHL Scholastic Player of the Year	2004
Daryl K. (Doc) Seaman Trophy	2004
NHL
Bill Masterton Memorial Trophy	2015
Second All-Star team	2015
NHL All-Star	2016, 2017, 2019

Awards and achievements
Preceded by Marc-Antoine Pouliot	Edmonton Oilers first-round draft pick 2004	Succeeded by Rob Schremp
Preceded by Dominic Moore	Winner of the Bill Masterton Memorial Trophy; 2015	Succeeded by Jaromír Jágr
