= David Desharnais =

Canadian ice hockey player (born 1986)

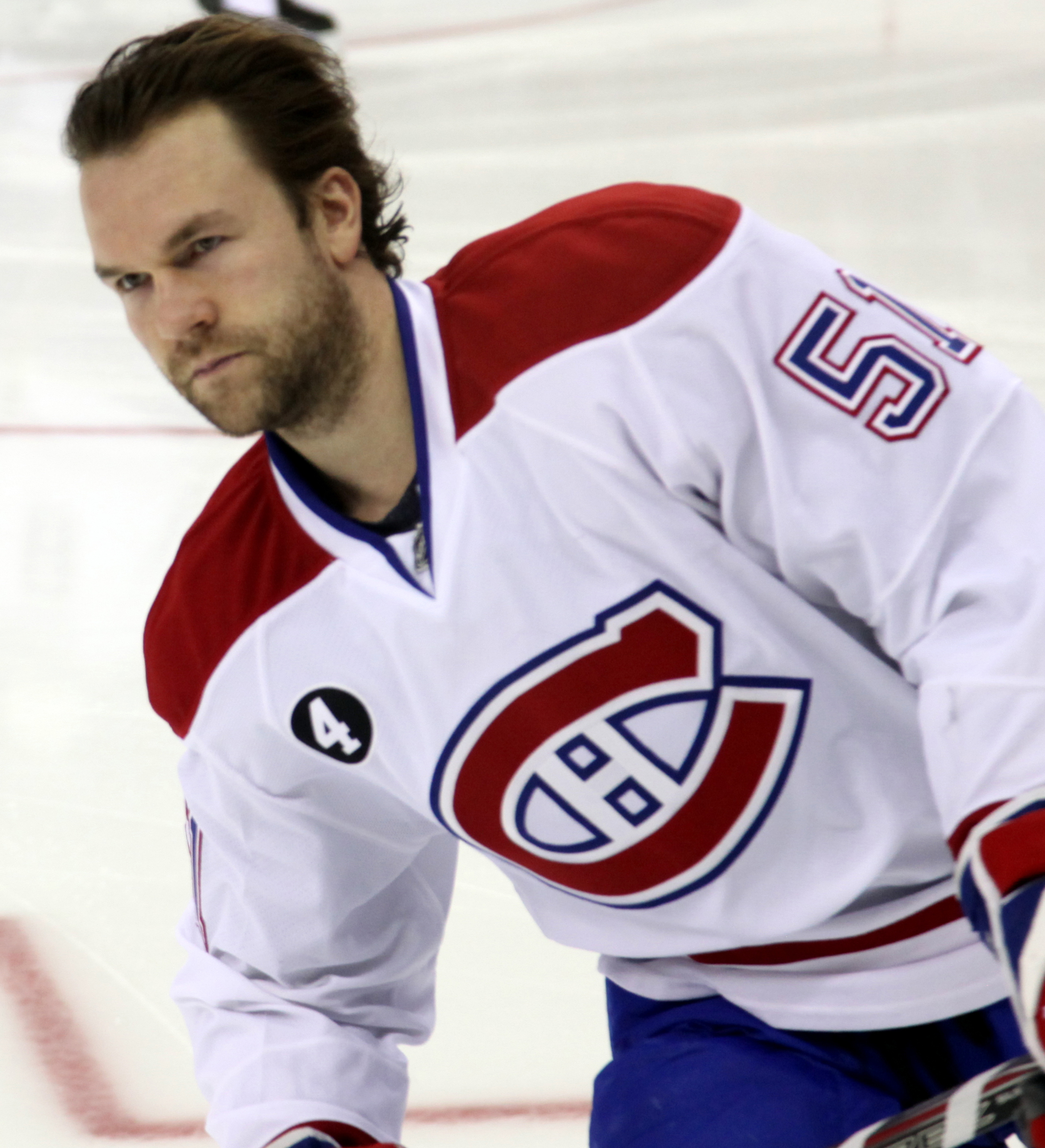
- Desharnais with the Montreal Canadiens in January 2015
- Born: September 14, 1986 (age 40) Laurier-Station, Quebec, Canada
- Height: 5 ft 7 in (170 cm)
- Weight: 176 lb (80 kg; 12 st 8 lb)
- Position: Centre
- Shot: Left
- Played for: Montreal Canadiens; Edmonton Oilers; New York Rangers; Avangard Omsk; HC Fribourg-Gottéron
- National team: Canada
- NHL draft: Undrafted
- Playing career: 2006–2023

David Kevin Denis Desharnais (born September 14, 1986) is a Canadian former professional ice hockey centre. He played in the National Hockey League (NHL) for the Montreal Canadiens, Edmonton Oilers and New York Rangers. He also played one season with Avangard Omsk of the Kontinental Hockey League (KHL) and his last four seasons of professional hockey with HC Fribourg-Gottéron of the National League (NL).

== Playing career ==
=== Amateur ===
As a youth, Desharnais played in the 1999 and 2000 Quebec International Pee-Wee Hockey Tournaments with minor ice hockey teams from Lotbinière, Quebec and Quebec City.

Desharnais spent his major junior career with the Chicoutimi Saguenéens of the Quebec Major Junior Hockey League (QMJHL). He became a prolific scorer over the course of his four seasons with the team, increasing his goal totals each year, scoring 38 in 61 games during his last season there. Serving as team captain, he totalled 374 points in 262 games. He won the Frank J. Selke Memorial Trophy as the QMJHL's most gentlemanly player three times consecutively from 2004–05 to 2006–07, when he was also named the most gentlemanly player of the Canadian Hockey League (CHL). Despite his junior success, Desharnais was passed over in the NHL entry draft, due in part to his small size.

=== Professional ===
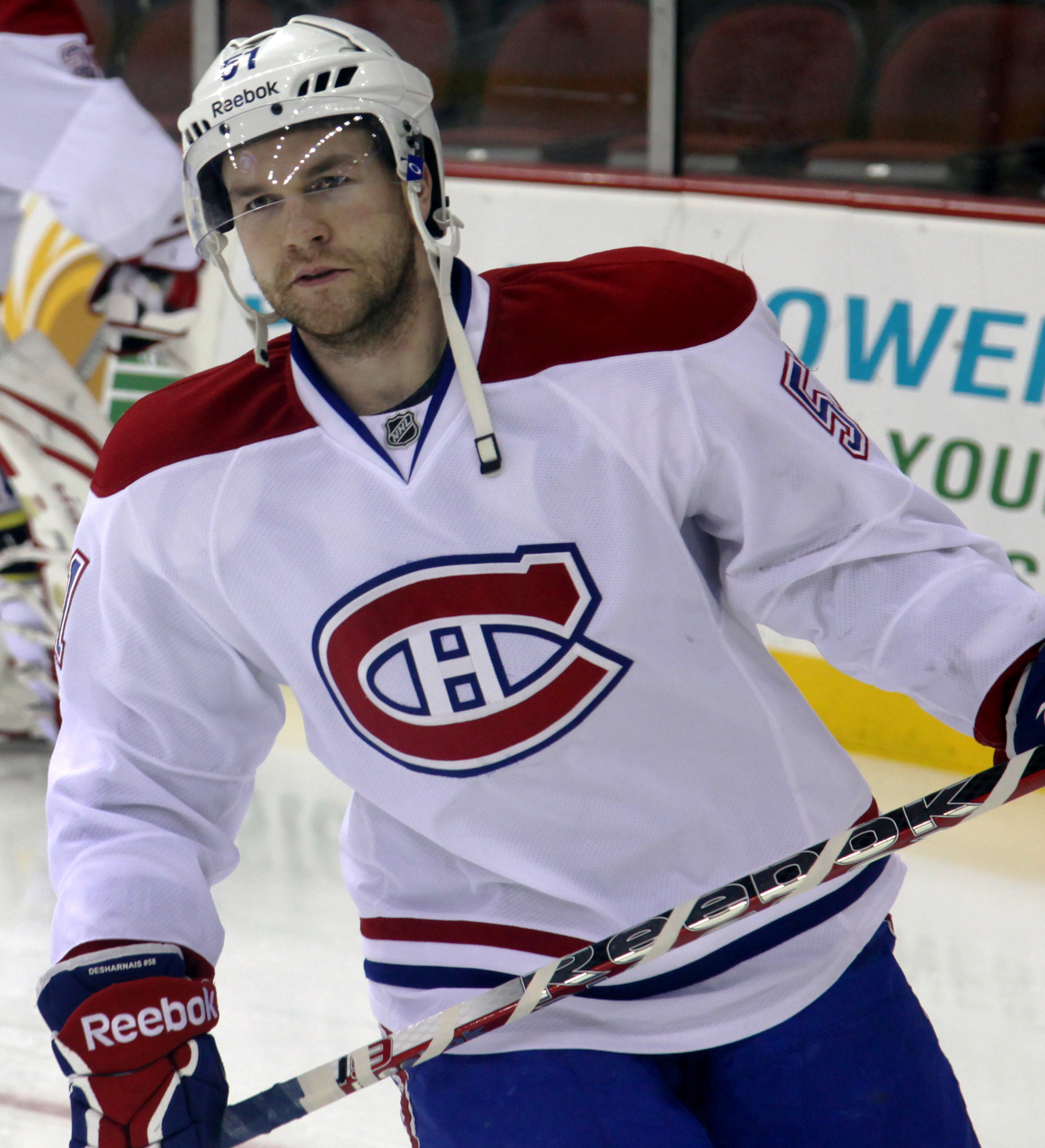
Desharnais with the Montreal Canadiens in 2012

The Montreal Canadiens invited Desharnais to their training camp in 2007. Although he did not make the team, he earned an assignment to the Cincinnati Cyclones of the ECHL. He had a phenomenal professional debut in Cincinnati, putting up 106 points in only 68 regular season games to lead the League in scoring before adding 33 points in 22 playoff games to lead the Cyclones to their first Kelly Cup championship. Desharnais was named ECHL Rookie of the Year and Most Valuable Player and was also named to both the All-Rookie Team and the First All-Star Team.

Following his successful season, Desharnais was again invited to the Canadiens' training camp in 2008, after which Montreal signed him to a two-year, two-way contract. He was assigned to the Canadiens' American Hockey League (AHL) affiliate, the Hamilton Bulldogs, where he spent the next two seasons. After a successful debut with the Bulldogs in 2008–09, Desharnais led the team in scoring in 2009–10 with 78 points in 60 games, also adding 23 points in 19 playoff games. That season, Desharnais also made his debut with the Canadiens, dressing for six NHL games and recording one assist.

In the midst of another stellar season in Hamilton after signing a one-year contract extension, Desharnais was recalled by the Canadiens on December 31, 2010. He scored his first NHL goal on January 12, 2011, deflecting a P. K. Subban point-shot past Marc-André Fleury of the Pittsburgh Penguins. Desharnais went on to play 43 games with the Canadiens, scoring eight goals and 22 points as well as one point in five Stanley Cup playoff games.

On June 20, 2011, Desharnais signed a two-year contract extension with the Canadiens. During the 2012–13 NHL lock-out, he played in the Swiss National League A for HC Fribourg-Gottéron, scoring 16 points in 16 games. He also represented Fribourg in the 2012 Spengler Cup. On March 15, 2013, Desharnais signed a four-year, $14 million contract extension with the Canadiens. In the 2016–17 season, on February 28, 2017, Desharnais was traded by the Canadiens to the Edmonton Oilers in exchange for Brandon Davidson.

On July 4, 2017, David Desharnais agreed to a 1-year, $1 million contract with the New York Rangers. In the following 2017–18 season, Desharnais was used up and down the lineup, posting 6 goals and 28 points in 72 games as the Rangers failed to qualify for the playoffs.

As a free agent, Desharnais opted to halt his North American career, agreeing to sign a one-year deal with Russian club, Lokomotiv Yaroslavl of the KHL on July 2, 2018. Desharnais was later released from his contract before 2018–19 season, switching clubs in signing with Avangard Omsk, on August 25, 2018.

== International play ==
In January 2022, Desharnais was selected to play for Team Canada at the 2022 Winter Olympics.

== Honours ==
Prior to the 2024–25 season, the Quebec Maritimes Junior Hockey League renamed its Frank J. Selke Memorial Trophy to be the David Desharnais Trophy, given annually to the most sportsmanlike player.

== Career statistics ==
=== Regular season and playoffs ===
| | | | Regular season | | | | | Playoffs |
| Season | Team | League | GP | G | A | Pts | PIM | GP | G | A | Pts | PIM |
|---|---|---|---|---|---|---|---|---|---|---|---|---|
| 2001–02 | Lévis Commandeurs | QMAAA | 2 | 0 | 2 | 2 | 0 | — | — | — | — | — |
| 2002–03 | Lévis Commandeurs | QMAAA | 42 | 27 | 42 | 69 | 10 | — | — | — | — | — |
| 2003–04 | Chicoutimi Saguenéens | QMJHL | 70 | 23 | 28 | 51 | 12 | 18 | 4 | 7 | 11 | 8 |
| 2004–05 | Chicoutimi Saguenéens | QMJHL | 68 | 32 | 65 | 97 | 39 | 19 | 5 | 10 | 15 | 8 |
| 2005–06 | Chicoutimi Saguenéens | QMJHL | 63 | 33 | 85 | 118 | 44 | 11 | 2 | 9 | 11 | 4 |
| 2006–07 | Chicoutimi Saguenéens | QMJHL | 61 | 38 | 70 | 108 | 32 | 4 | 1 | 5 | 6 | 2 |
| 2006–07 | Bridgeport Sound Tigers | AHL | 7 | 1 | 1 | 2 | 4 | — | — | — | — | — |
| 2007–08 | Cincinnati Cyclones | ECHL | 68 | 29 | 77 | 106 | 18 | 22 | 9 | 24 | 33 | 18 |
| 2007–08 | Hamilton Bulldogs | AHL | 4 | 0 | 1 | 1 | 6 | — | — | — | — | — |
| 2008–09 | Hamilton Bulldogs | AHL | 77 | 24 | 34 | 58 | 20 | 6 | 1 | 3 | 4 | 4 |
| 2009–10 | Hamilton Bulldogs | AHL | 60 | 27 | 51 | 78 | 23 | 19 | 10 | 13 | 23 | 16 |
| 2009–10 | Montreal Canadiens | NHL | 6 | 0 | 1 | 1 | 0 | — | — | — | — | — |
| 2010–11 | Hamilton Bulldogs | AHL | 35 | 10 | 35 | 45 | 24 | — | — | — | — | — |
| 2010–11 | Montreal Canadiens | NHL | 43 | 8 | 14 | 22 | 12 | 5 | 0 | 1 | 1 | 2 |
| 2011–12 | Montreal Canadiens | NHL | 81 | 16 | 44 | 60 | 24 | — | — | — | — | — |
| 2012–13 | HC Fribourg–Gottéron | NLA | 16 | 4 | 12 | 16 | 12 | — | — | — | — | — |
| 2012–13 | Montreal Canadiens | NHL | 48 | 10 | 18 | 28 | 26 | 5 | 0 | 1 | 1 | 2 |
| 2013–14 | Montreal Canadiens | NHL | 79 | 16 | 36 | 52 | 24 | 17 | 2 | 6 | 8 | 6 |
| 2014–15 | Montreal Canadiens | NHL | 82 | 14 | 34 | 48 | 24 | 11 | 1 | 2 | 3 | 4 |
| 2015–16 | Montreal Canadiens | NHL | 65 | 11 | 18 | 29 | 20 | — | — | — | — | — |
| 2016–17 | Montreal Canadiens | NHL | 31 | 4 | 6 | 10 | 6 | — | — | — | — | — |
| 2016–17 | Edmonton Oilers | NHL | 18 | 2 | 2 | 4 | 6 | 13 | 1 | 3 | 4 | 0 |
| 2017–18 | New York Rangers | NHL | 71 | 6 | 22 | 28 | 18 | — | — | — | — | — |
| 2018–19 | Avangard Omsk | KHL | 58 | 7 | 21 | 28 | 84 | 18 | 0 | 7 | 7 | 6 |
| 2019–20 | HC Fribourg–Gottéron | NL | 36 | 12 | 14 | 26 | 18 | — | — | — | — | — |
| 2020–21 | HC Fribourg–Gottéron | NL | 45 | 14 | 26 | 40 | 24 | 5 | 0 | 2 | 2 | 2 |
| 2021–22 | HC Fribourg–Gottéron | NL | 47 | 19 | 24 | 43 | 24 | 9 | 1 | 6 | 7 | 4 |
| 2022–23 | HC Fribourg–Gottéron | NL | 52 | 13 | 29 | 42 | 36 | 2 | 0 | 0 | 0 | 25 |
| NHL totals | | | 524 | 87 | 195 | 282 | 160 | 51 | 4 | 13 | 17 | 14 |

=== International ===
| Year | Team | Event | Result | GP | G | A | Pts | PIM |
|---|---|---|---|---|---|---|---|---|
| 2022 | Canada | OG | 6th | 5 | 0 | 1 | 1 | 0 |
| Senior totals | | | | 5 | 0 | 1 | 1 | 0 |
