= Byron Ritchie =

Canadian ice hockey player (born 1977)

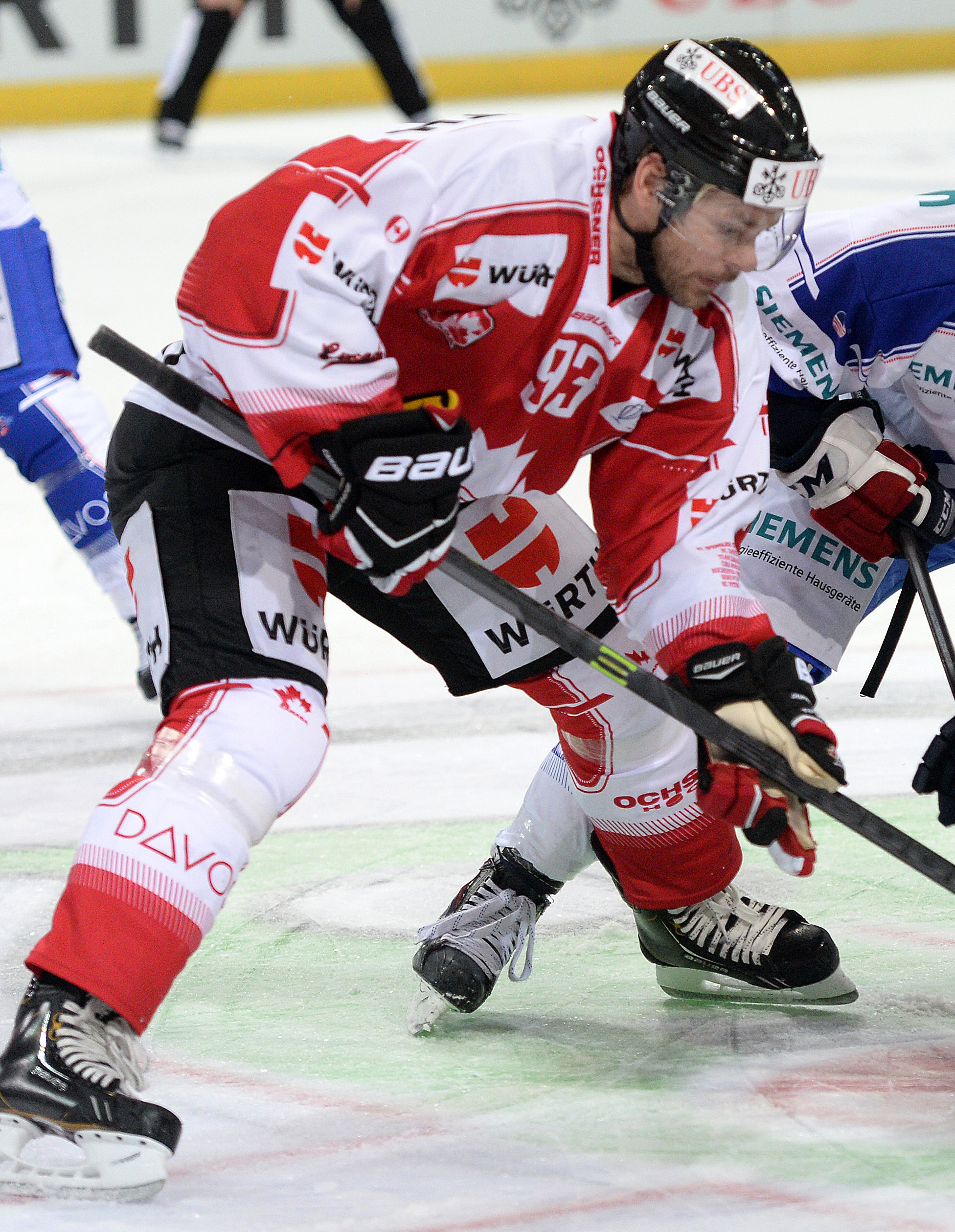
- Ritchie in 2013
- Born: April 24, 1977 (age 49) Burnaby, British Columbia, Canada
- Height: 5 ft 10 in (178 cm)
- Weight: 190 lb (86 kg; 13 st 8 lb)
- Position: Centre
- Shot: Left
- Played for: Carolina Hurricanes; Florida Panthers; Calgary Flames; Vancouver Canucks; Genève-Servette HC; HC Dinamo Minsk; Modo Hockey; SC Bern
- NHL draft: 165th overall, 1995; Hartford Whalers
- Playing career: 1996–2017

Byron Ritchie (born April 24, 1977) is a Canadian former professional ice hockey forward. He was born in Burnaby, British Columbia, and grew up in North Delta, British Columbia. Ritchie saw action in a total of 332 games in the National Hockey League between 1998 and 2008 and also played in Sweden, Switzerland and Belarus.

== Playing career ==
As a youth, Ritchie played in the 1990 and 1991 Quebec International Pee-Wee Hockey Tournaments with a minor ice hockey team from North Delta.

Ritchie was drafted in the 7th round (165th overall) by the Hartford Whalers in the 1995 NHL entry draft, from the Lethbridge Hurricanes. He was named to the Western Hockey League East Second All-Star Team in 1996 and 1997.

On May 13, 1997, after a major junior game in the Memorial Cup refereed by a Francophone from Quebec, he was caught by an RDS camera yelling: "Fuck you, you fucking Frogs! Fuck them all!" He apologized the next day at practice stating "Whether the camera was on me or not doesn't make it right." For the remainder of the tournament, he was booed mercilessly by the fans in Hull, Quebec, where the tournament was taking place.

His rights transferred to the Carolina Hurricanes when the Whalers franchise relocated in 1997. On December 21, 1998, Ritchie made his NHL debut with the Hurricanes against the Buffalo Sabres. On October 26, 2001, he set a Lowell Lock Monsters franchise record for points in a game with six (2 goals, 4 assists). He was named the American Hockey League Player of the Week on October 29, 2001.

On January 16, 2002, he was traded to the Florida Panthers with Sandis Ozolinsh for Bret Hedican, Tomas Malec, Kevyn Adams and a conditional 2nd round selection in the 2003 NHL entry draft. On July 4, 2004, he was signed as an unrestricted free agent by the Calgary Flames. On July 2, 2007, Ritchie signed with the Vancouver Canucks, where he played for one season.

After the Canucks chose not to re-sign him, he signed as a free agent to play in Europe for Geneve-Servette HC of the NLA and signed a one-year contract. After a very good season in Switzerland during which he earned 60 points and took the fifth place of the overall top-scorer rankings, Ritchie, again a free agent, decided to sign with the Dinamo Minsk of the Russian KHL. In the 2009–10 season, Bryon was hampered by injury and played in just 12 games posting 3 goals for Minsk.

On June 14, 2010, Ritchie remained in Europe and signed a one-year contract to return to Sweden with Modo of the SEL. After a single season in Sweden, Ritchie signed to return to the Swiss NLA with SC Bern for the 2011–12 season. He won the Swiss championship with Bern in 2013.

After four seasons with Bern, having finished the 2014–15 season as team captain, Ritchie left the NLA and signed for a second spell with Modo Hockey of the SHL on May 10, 2015. He announced his retirement in March 2017.

Medal record

Ice hockey

Representing Canada

Spengler Cup
Gold medal – first place	2012 Davos	

== Career statistics ==
			Regular season					Playoffs
Season	Team	League	GP	G	A	Pts	PIM	GP	G	A	Pts	PIM
1993–94	Lethbridge Hurricanes	WHL	44	4	11	15	44	6	0	0	0	14
1994–95	Lethbridge Hurricanes	WHL	58	22	28	50	132	—	—	—	—	—
1995–96	Lethbridge Hurricanes	WHL	66	55	51	106	163	4	0	2	2	4
1995–96	Springfield Falcons	AHL	6	2	1	3	4	8	0	3	3	0
1996–97	Lethbridge Hurricanes	WHL	63	50	76	126	115	18	16	12	28	28
1997–98	Beast of New Haven	AHL	65	13	18	31	97	—	—	—	—	—
1998–99	Carolina Hurricanes	NHL	3	0	0	0	0	—	—	—	—	—
1998–99	Beast of New Haven	AHL	66	24	33	57	139	—	—	—	—	—
1999–2000	Carolina Hurricanes	NHL	26	0	2	2	17	—	—	—	—	—
1999–2000	Cincinnati Cyclones	IHL	34	8	13	21	81	10	1	6	7	32
2000–01	Cincinnati Cyclones	IHL	77	31	35	66	166	5	3	2	5	10
2001–02	Carolina Hurricanes	NHL	4	0	0	0	2	—	—	—	—	—
2001–02	Florida Panthers	NHL	31	5	6	11	34	—	—	—	—	—
2001–02	Lowell Lock Monsters	AHL	43	25	30	55	38	—	—	—	—	—
2002–03	Florida Panthers	NHL	30	0	3	3	19	—	—	—	—	—
2002–03	San Antonio Rampage	AHL	26	3	14	17	68	3	1	0	1	0
2003–04	Florida Panthers	NHL	50	5	6	11	84	—	—	—	—	—
2004–05	Rögle BK	Allsv	30	17	16	33	111	2	0	0	0	4
2005–06	Calgary Flames	NHL	45	4	2	6	69	7	0	0	0	0
2006–07	Calgary Flames	NHL	64	8	6	14	68	1	0	0	0	10
2007–08	Vancouver Canucks	NHL	71	3	8	11	80	—	—	—	—	—
2008–09	Genève–Servette HC	NLA	45	22	38	60	62	3	0	0	0	14
2009–10	Dinamo Minsk	KHL	12	3	2	5	8	—	—	—	—	—
2010–11	Modo Hockey	SEL	53	23	21	44	72	—	—	—	—	—
2011–12	SC Bern	NLA	47	22	21	43	50	17	2	12	14	18
2012–13	SC Bern	NLA	46	19	30	49	36	20	7	15	22	20
2013–14	SC Bern	NLA	43	11	16	27	84	—	—	—	—	—
2014–15	SC Bern	NLA	50	14	29	43	38	11	1	1	2	6
2015–16	Modo Hockey	SHL	16	3	2	5	2	—	—	—	—	—
2016–17	Modo Hockey	Allsv	35	4	15	19	51	—	—	—	—	—
NHL totals			324	25	33	58	373	8	0	0	0	10
NLA totals			231	88	134	222	270	51	10	28	38	58

== Awards and honours ==
Award	Year
WHL
East Second All-Star Team	1996
East Second All-Star Team	1997
