= Radim Hruška =

Czech ice hockey player

- Born: October 12, 1984 (age 41) Vsetín, Czechoslovakia
- Height: 6 ft 1 in (185 cm)
- Weight: 165 lb (75 kg; 11 st 11 lb)
- Position: Defence
- Shot: Left
- Tipsport Liga team Former teams: HC Nové Zámky; HC Vsetín; HK 36 Skalica; HC Vítkovice Steel; HC Kometa Brno; HC Karlovy Vary; BK Mladá Boleslav; HC Košice; MsHK Žilina
- NHL draft: Undrafted
- Playing career: 2002–2020

Radim Hruška (born October 12, 1984) is a Czech professional ice hockey player who currently plays with HC Nové Zámky in the Tipsport Liga.

Hruška previously played for HC Vsetín, HC Slezan Opava, HC Olomouc, HC Havířov, HK 36 Skalica and HC Vítkovice.

== Career statistics ==
			Regular season					Playoffs
Season	Team	League	GP	G	A	Pts	PIM	GP	G	A	Pts	PIM
1999–00	HC Vsetin U18	Czech U18	36	6	1	7	8	2	0	0	0	0
2000–01	HC Vsetin U18	Czech U18	34	18	20	38	8	—	—	—	—	—
2001–02	HC Vsetin U20	Czech U20	33	10	5	15	10	2	0	0	0	2
2002–03	HC Vsetin U20	Czech U20	37	20	20	40	44	—	—	—	—	—
2002–03	HC Vsetin	Czech	7	0	0	0	0	—	—	—	—	—
2003–04	Vsetínská hokejová U20	Czech U20	15	9	9	18	24	5	1	2	3	5
2003–04	Vsetínská hokejová	Czech	36	2	3	5	34	—	—	—	—	—
2003–04	HC Slezan Opava	Czech2	8	3	1	4	2	—	—	—	—	—
2004–05	Vsetínská hokejová U20	Czech U20	6	6	4	10	2	8	5	4	9	10
2004–05	Vsetínská hokejová	Czech	34	1	1	2	4	—	—	—	—	—
2004–05	HC Olomouc	Czech2	15	5	5	10	4	—	—	—	—	—
2004–05	HC Slezan Opava	Czech2	15	2	10	12	20	—	—	—	—	—
2005–06	Vsetínská hokejová	Czech	33	1	4	5	10	—	—	—	—	—
2005–06	HC Havířov Panthers	Czech2	27	13	7	20	14	8	3	3	6	6
2006–07	HK 36 Skalica	Slovak	11	1	0	1	10	—	—	—	—	—
2006–07	HC Kometa Brno	Czech2	37	18	10	28	26	4	1	2	3	4
2007–08	HC Vítkovice	Czech	52	12	9	21	24	—	—	—	—	—
2007–08	HC Havířov Panthers	Czech2	2	2	1	3	0	—	—	—	—	—
2008–09	HC Vítkovice	Czech	51	11	8	19	16	10	2	2	4	0
2009–10	HC Vítkovice	Czech	46	11	10	21	28	16	6	3	9	6
2010–11	HC Kometa Brno	Czech	52	23	22	45	28	—	—	—	—	—
2011–12	HC Kometa Brno	Czech	9	0	1	1	0	—	—	—	—	—
2011–12	HC Vítkovice	Czech	20	4	1	5	8	—	—	—	—	—
2012–13	HC Vítkovice	Czech	42	5	6	11	12	11	0	1	1	4
2013–14	HC Energie Karlovy Vary	Czech	48	6	3	9	18	—	—	—	—	—
2014–15	HC Energie Karlovy Vary	Czech	48	8	8	16	16	—	—	—	—	—
2015–16	BK Mladá Boleslav	Czech	47	3	4	7	22	4	0	0	0	2
2016–17	HC Kosice	Slovak	35	7	6	13	6	—	—	—	—	—
2016–17	MsHK Zilina	Slovak	19	6	7	13	10	11	5	4	9	2
2017–18	VHK Vsetín	Czech2	16	3	6	9	10	—	—	—	—	—
2017–18	MsHK Zilina	Slovak	32	6	7	13	16	6	1	1	2	6
2018–19	HC Nove Zamky	Slovak	45	6	6	12	18	4	1	2	3	2
2019–20	HC Nove Zamky	Slovak	40	7	11	18	12	—	—	—	—	—
Czech totals			525	87	80	167	220	41	8	6	14	12
Czech2 totals			120	46	40	86	76	12	4	5	9	10
Slovak totals			182	33	37	70	72	21	7	7	14	10
