= Vladimír Svačina =

Czech ice hockey player

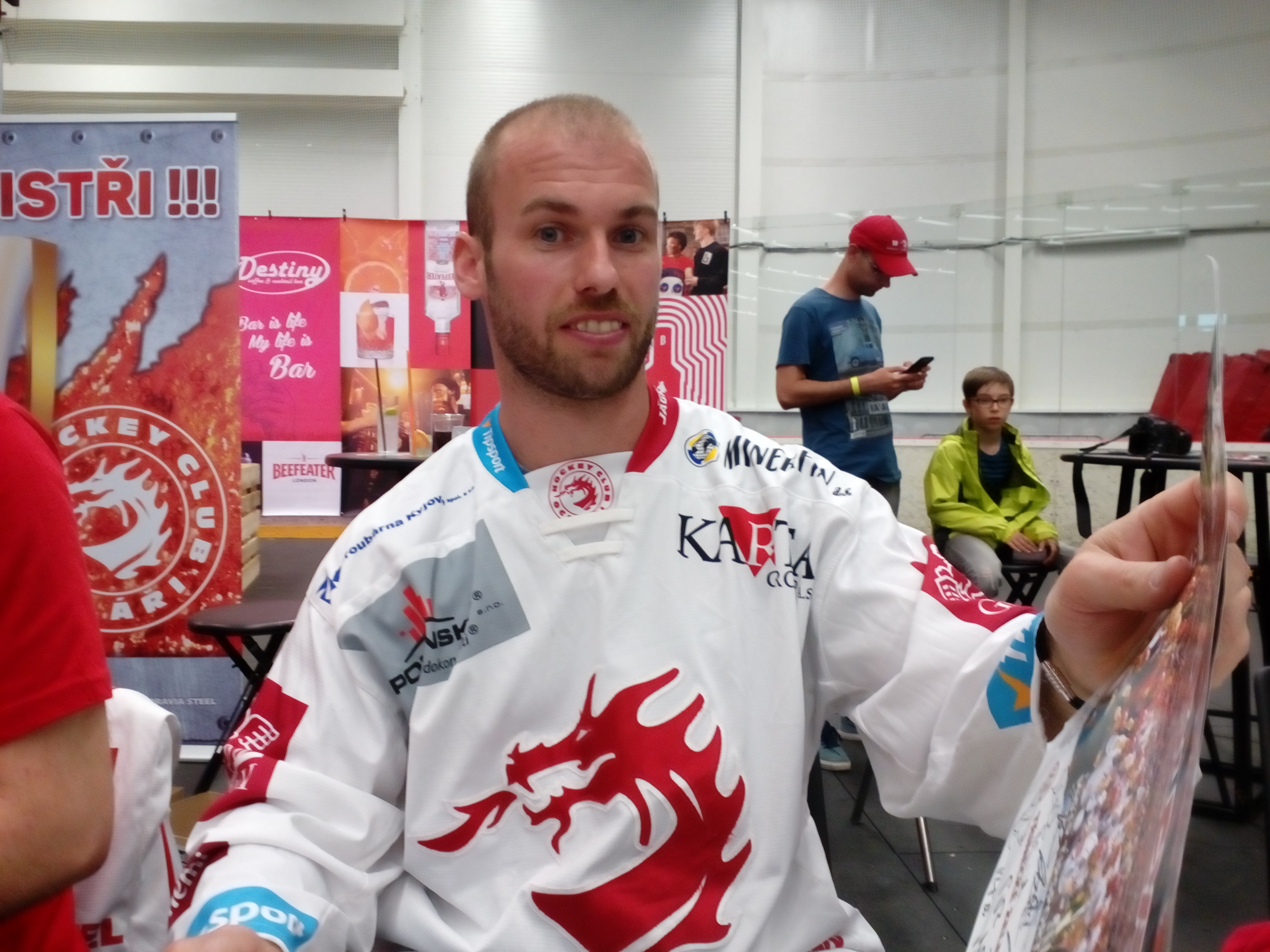
- Born: April 28, 1987 (age 37); Studénka, Czechoslovakia
- Height: 5 ft 10 in (178 cm)
- Weight: 187 lb (85 kg; 13 st 5 lb)
- Position: Forward
- Shoots: Right
- Czech.1 team Former teams: HC Frýdek-Místek; HC Vítkovice; HC Plzeň; BK Mladá Boleslav; HK Poprad; HC Oceláři Třinec; HC Bílí Tygři Liberec; HC Kometa Brno; HC Dynamo Pardubice
- NHL draft: Undrafted
- Playing career: 2007–present

Vladimír Svačina (born 28 April 1987 in Studénka) is a Czech professional ice hockey player currently under contract with HC Frýdek-Místek of the Czech.1 Liga. He formerly played with HC Plzeň in the Czech Extraliga during the 2010–11 Czech Extraliga season.
