= Igor Musatov =

Russian ice hockey player

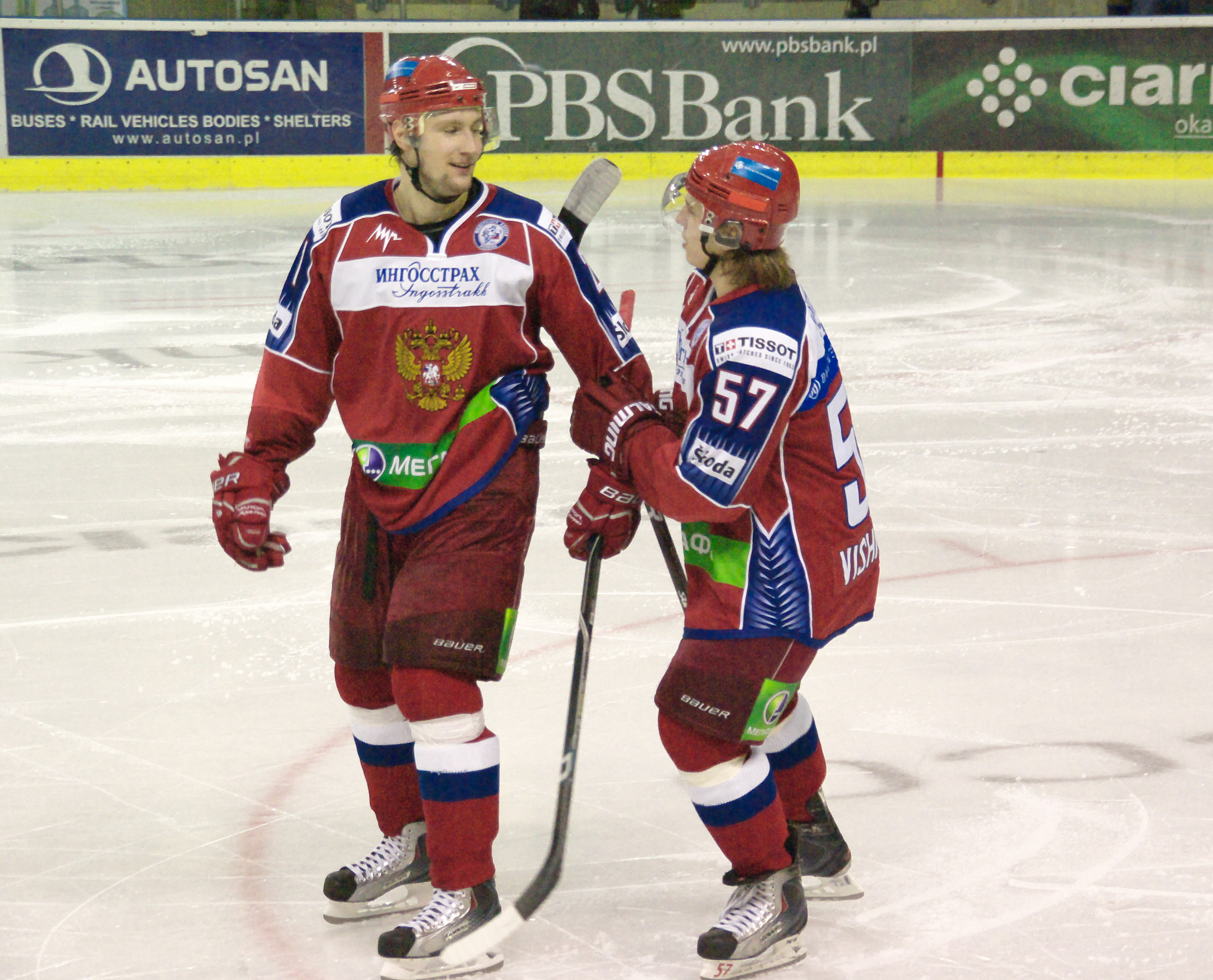
- Born: September 23, 1987 (age 38) Moscow, Russia
- Height: 6 ft 2 in (188 cm)
- Weight: 181 lb (82 kg; 12 st 13 lb)
- Position: Left wing
- Shot: Right
- Played for: HC Spartak Moscow; Ak Bars Kazan; Neftekhimik Nizhnekamsk; Atlant Mytishchi; Salavat Yulaev Ufa; Lokomotiv Yaroslavl; Avangard Omsk; HC Vityaz; HC Slovan Bratislava
- Playing career: 2005–2017

Igor Musatov (born September 23, 1987) is a Russian former professional ice hockey winger. He last played for the Slovak club HC Slovan Bratislava of the Kontinental Hockey League (KHL).

== Personal life ==
On June 8, 2013, Musatov wed two-time Olympic Gold medalist Rhythmic gymnast Evgenia Kanaeva. However, the pair has since divorced due to Igor’s alcoholic problems and violent outburst when drunk, which caused a deep strain into the pair’s marriage.

In September 2019 he was arrested in Moscow and charged with Bitcoin fraud worth 800.000$. On November 2, 2020 he was sentenced to four years in a corrective labor colony by the Presnensky district court. He continued to deny the allegations. Musatov was released on parole on October 19, 2021.

== Career statistics ==
| | | | Regular season | | | | | Playoffs |
| Season | Team | League | GP | G | A | Pts | PIM | GP | G | A | Pts | PIM |
|---|---|---|---|---|---|---|---|---|---|---|---|---|
| 2003–04 | HC Spartak Moscow-2 | Russia3 | 32 | 0 | 3 | 3 | 24 | — | — | — | — | — |
| 2004–05 | HC Spartak Moscow | Russia | 2 | 0 | 0 | 0 | 0 | — | — | — | — | — |
| 2004–05 | HC Spartak Moscow-2 | Russia3 | 52 | 10 | 12 | 22 | 72 | — | — | — | — | — |
| 2005–06 | HC Spartak Moscow | Russia | 9 | 0 | 1 | 1 | 29 | 1 | 0 | 0 | 0 | 0 |
| 2005–06 | HC Spartak Moscow-2 | Russia3 | 36 | 11 | 8 | 19 | 109 | — | — | — | — | — |
| 2006–07 | Ak Bars Kazan | Russia | 33 | 5 | 1 | 6 | 74 | 13 | 1 | 0 | 1 | 10 |
| 2006–07 | Ak Bars Kazan-2 | Russia3 | 3 | 6 | 3 | 9 | 4 | — | — | — | — | — |
| 2007–08 | Ak Bars Kazan | Russia | 21 | 3 | 3 | 6 | 20 | — | — | — | — | — |
| 2007–08 | Ak Bars Kazan-2 | Russia3 | 31 | 16 | 15 | 31 | 78 | — | — | — | — | — |
| 2008–09 | Neftyanik Leninogorsk | Russia2 | 2 | 0 | 0 | 0 | 8 | — | — | — | — | — |
| 2008–09 | HC Neftekhimik Nizhnekamsk | KHL | 36 | 2 | 3 | 5 | 52 | 1 | 0 | 0 | 0 | 0 |
| 2009–10 | HC Spartak Moscow | KHL | 55 | 6 | 5 | 11 | 50 | 10 | 1 | 1 | 2 | 8 |
| 2010–11 | HC Spartak Moscow | KHL | 29 | 4 | 1 | 5 | 32 | — | — | — | — | — |
| 2010–11 | Atlant Mytishchi | KHL | 20 | 2 | 3 | 5 | 42 | 20 | 6 | 4 | 10 | 28 |
| 2011–12 | Atlant Mytishchi | KHL | 42 | 7 | 4 | 11 | 18 | 12 | 0 | 0 | 0 | 10 |
| 2012–13 | Salavat Yulaev Ufa | KHL | 36 | 5 | 5 | 10 | 58 | 12 | 1 | 3 | 4 | 2 |
| 2013–14 | Salavat Yulaev Ufa | KHL | 8 | 1 | 0 | 1 | 0 | — | — | — | — | — |
| 2013–14 | Lokomotiv Yaroslavl | KHL | 28 | 4 | 6 | 10 | 45 | 13 | 0 | 1 | 1 | 35 |
| 2014–15 | Lokomotiv Yaroslavl | KHL | 15 | 1 | 1 | 2 | 4 | — | — | — | — | — |
| 2014–15 | Avangard Omsk | KHL | 19 | 3 | 5 | 8 | 29 | 12 | 0 | 0 | 0 | 0 |
| 2015–16 | HC Vityaz Podolsk | KHL | 42 | 4 | 3 | 7 | 22 | — | — | — | — | — |
| 2016–17 | HC Slovan Bratislava | KHL | 29 | 6 | 2 | 8 | 10 | — | — | — | — | — |
| KHL totals | | | 359 | 45 | 38 | 83 | 362 | 80 | 8 | 9 | 17 | 83 |
