= Lukáš Kucsera =

Czech ice hockey player

- Born: 9 September 1991 (age 33); Opava, Czechoslovakia
- Height: 5 ft 11 in (180 cm)
- Weight: 154 lb (70 kg; 11 st 0 lb)
- Position: Forward
- Shoots: Left
- Czech team: HC Vítkovice Steel
- Playing career: 2011–present

Lukas Kucsera (born 9 September 1991) is a Czech professional ice hockey player. He played with HC Vítkovice Steel in the Czech Extraliga during the 2010–11 Czech Extraliga season.
