= Benjamin Plüss =

Swiss ice hockey player (born 1979)

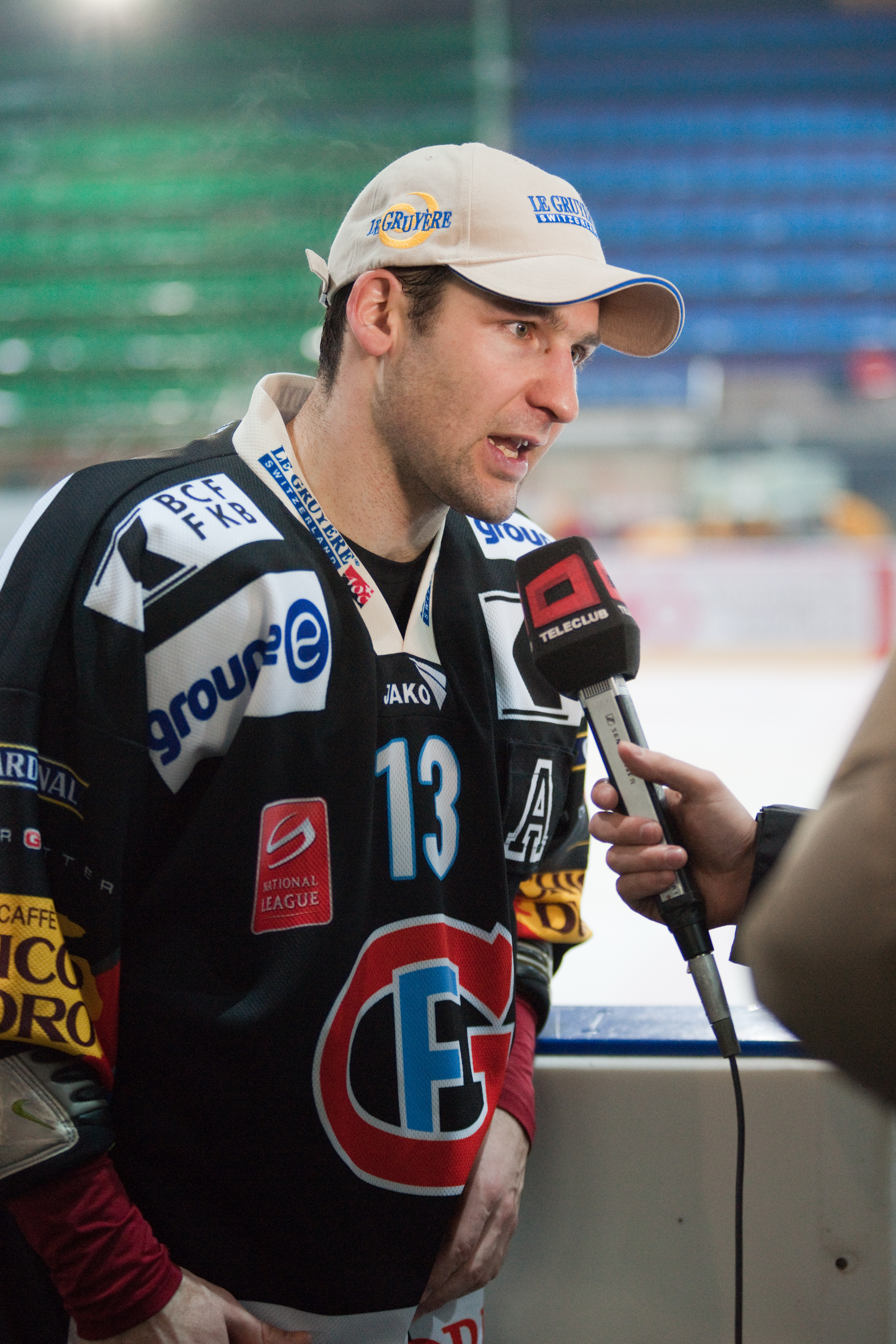
- Born: March 3, 1979 (age 46) Bülach, Switzerland
- Height: 5 ft 10 in (178 cm)
- Weight: 187 lb (85 kg; 13 st 5 lb)
- Position: Forward
- Shot: Left
- Played for: Kloten Flyers; Lausanne HC; SCL Tigers; HC Fribourg-Gottéron
- National team: Switzerland
- Playing career: 1998–2016

Benjamin Plüss (born March 3, 1979) is a Swiss former professional ice hockey player who last played for HC Fribourg-Gottéron of the National League A.

== Playing career ==
A product of the Kloten Flyers, he made his debut in the Swiss top-flight National League A (NLA) for the Flyers during the 1998-99 season. In the course of his professional career, he spent one year each with third-division side EHC Winterthur and NLB side Lausanne HC, two years with the SCL Tigers in the NLA and 13 years with HC Fribourg-Gottéron in the NLA. He reached the NLA finals with the team in 2013. He announced his retirement in March 2016. Plüss saw the ice in a total of 743 NLA contests, tallying 444 points.

== International play ==
Plüss competed in the 2012 IIHF World Championship and the 2014 IIHF World Championship as a member of the Switzerland men's national ice hockey team. He won 43 caps for the Swiss national team.
