= Denis Khlystov =

Russian ice hockey player (born 1979)

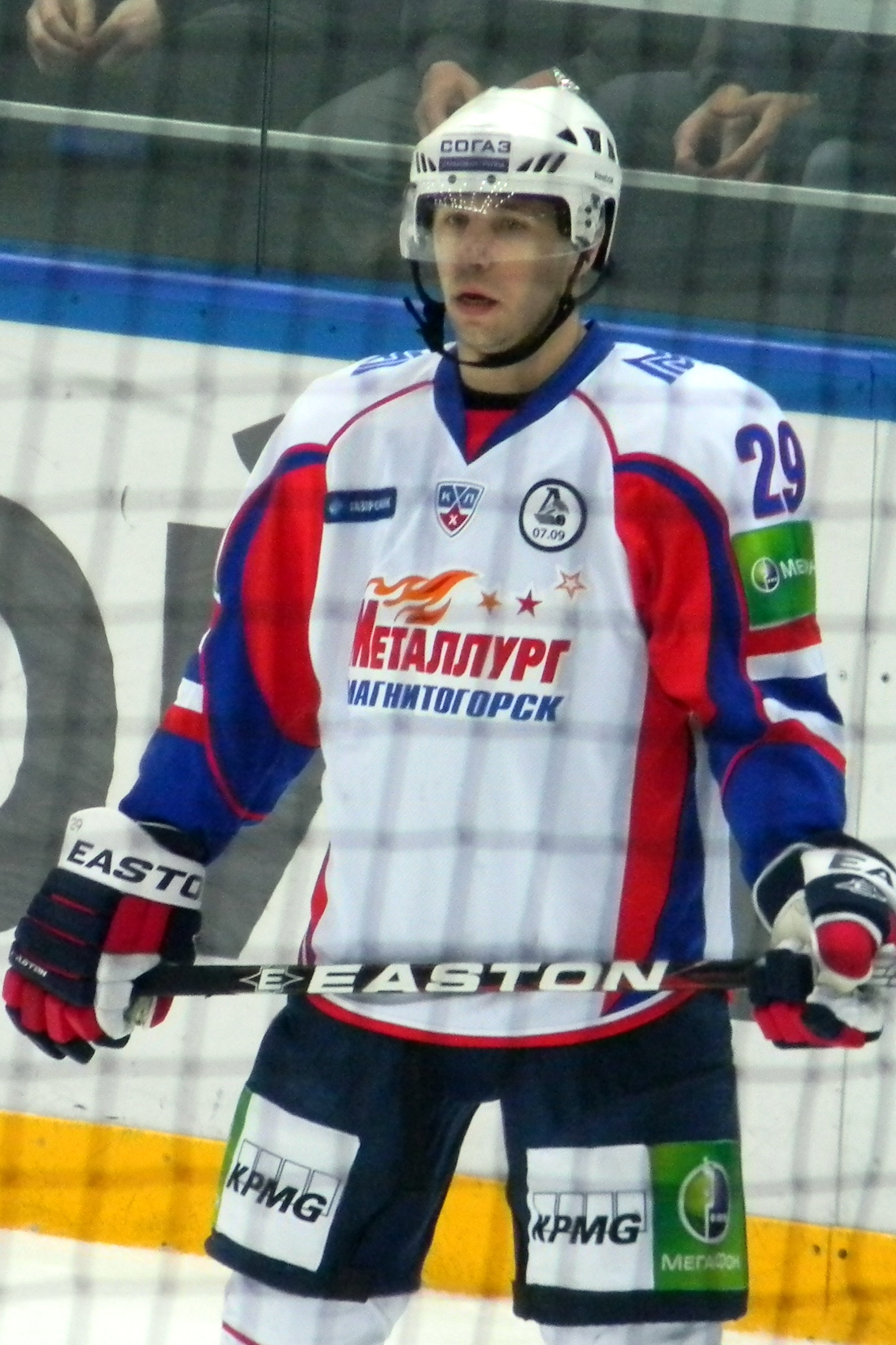
- Born: July 4, 1979 (age 47) Ufa, Russia
- Height: 5 ft 10 in (178 cm)
- Weight: 181 lb (82 kg; 12 st 13 lb)
- Position: Centre
- Shot: Left
- Played for: Salavat Yulaev Ufa; Neftekhimik Nizhnekamsk; Metallurg Magnitogorsk; HC Yugra; Ak Bars Kazan
- Playing career: 1999–2017

Denis Khlystov (born July 4, 1979) is a Russian former professional ice hockey centre who played in the Kontinental Hockey League (KHL).

== Career statistics ==
| | | | Regular season | | | | | Playoffs |
| Season | Team | League | GP | G | A | Pts | PIM | GP | G | A | Pts | PIM |
|---|---|---|---|---|---|---|---|---|---|---|---|---|
| 1994–95 | Nowoil Ufa | Russia2 | 1 | 0 | 0 | 0 | 0 | — | — | — | — | — |
| 1995–96 | Nowoil Ufa | Russia2 | 11 | 1 | 0 | 1 | 0 | — | — | — | — | — |
| 1996–97 | Nowoil Ufa | Russia3 | 34 | 2 | 4 | 6 | 16 | — | — | — | — | — |
| 1997–98 | Nowoil Ufa | Russia3 | 28 | 9 | 5 | 14 | 12 | — | — | — | — | — |
| 1998–99 | Nowoil Ufa | Russia3 | 38 | 13 | 13 | 26 | 38 | — | — | — | — | — |
| 1999–00 | Salavat Yulaev Ufa | Russia | 19 | 1 | 2 | 3 | 10 | — | — | — | — | — |
| 1999–00 | Salavat Yulaev Ufa-2 | Russia3 | 13 | 5 | 6 | 11 | 10 | — | — | — | — | — |
| 2000–01 | Salavat Yulaev Ufa | Russia | 34 | 1 | 3 | 4 | 24 | — | — | — | — | — |
| 2000–01 | Salavat Yulaev Ufa-2 | Russia3 | 15 | 5 | 12 | 17 | 24 | — | — | — | — | — |
| 2001–02 | Salavat Yulaev Ufa | Russia | 30 | 1 | 6 | 7 | 34 | — | — | — | — | — |
| 2001–02 | Salavat Yulaev Ufa-2 | Russia3 | 7 | 3 | 3 | 6 | 10 | — | — | — | — | — |
| 2002–03 | Salavat Yulaev Ufa | Russia | 26 | 4 | 1 | 5 | 22 | 3 | 0 | 0 | 0 | 2 |
| 2002–03 | Salavat Yulaev Ufa-2 | Russia3 | 9 | 4 | 2 | 6 | 14 | — | — | — | — | — |
| 2003–04 | Salavat Yulaev Ufa | Russia | 53 | 5 | 8 | 13 | 63 | — | — | — | — | — |
| 2003–04 | Salavat Yulaev Ufa-2 | Russia3 | 9 | 5 | 4 | 9 | 10 | — | — | — | — | — |
| 2004–05 | Salavat Yulaev Ufa | Russia | 51 | 8 | 8 | 16 | 57 | — | — | — | — | — |
| 2004–05 | Salavat Yulaev Ufa-2 | Russia3 | 4 | 3 | 2 | 5 | 0 | — | — | — | — | — |
| 2005–06 | Salavat Yulaev Ufa | Russia | 27 | 2 | 3 | 5 | 46 | 1 | 0 | 0 | 0 | 2 |
| 2005–06 | Salavat Yulaev Ufa-2 | Russia3 | 6 | 2 | 1 | 3 | 20 | — | — | — | — | — |
| 2006–07 | HC Neftekhimik Nizhnekamsk | Russia | 53 | 8 | 15 | 23 | 103 | 4 | 1 | 0 | 1 | 4 |
| 2007–08 | HC Neftekhimik Nizhnekamsk | Russia | 43 | 5 | 7 | 12 | 50 | 5 | 2 | 0 | 2 | 4 |
| 2007–08 | HC Neftekhimik Nizhnekamsk-2 | Russia3 | 1 | 0 | 0 | 0 | 36 | — | — | — | — | — |
| 2008–09 | Metallurg Magnitogorsk | KHL | 56 | 7 | 6 | 13 | 80 | 12 | 0 | 3 | 3 | 35 |
| 2009–10 | Metallurg Magnitogorsk | KHL | 54 | 14 | 16 | 30 | 44 | 10 | 2 | 3 | 5 | 10 |
| 2010–11 | Metallurg Magnitogorsk | KHL | 51 | 12 | 12 | 24 | 43 | 20 | 1 | 4 | 5 | 4 |
| 2011–12 | Metallurg Magnitogorsk | KHL | 54 | 10 | 14 | 24 | 25 | 12 | 0 | 5 | 5 | 16 |
| 2012–13 | Salavat Yulaev Ufa | KHL | 49 | 7 | 20 | 27 | 58 | 5 | 2 | 1 | 3 | 8 |
| 2013–14 | Salavat Yulaev Ufa | KHL | 52 | 13 | 15 | 28 | 47 | 18 | 1 | 6 | 7 | 4 |
| 2014–15 | Salavat Yulaev Ufa | KHL | 51 | 4 | 7 | 11 | 60 | 4 | 1 | 0 | 1 | 2 |
| 2015–16 | Salavat Yulaev Ufa | KHL | 48 | 7 | 4 | 11 | 48 | 18 | 2 | 2 | 4 | 14 |
| 2016–17 | Yugra Khanty-Mansiysk | KHL | 31 | 5 | 2 | 7 | 32 | — | — | — | — | — |
| 2016–17 | Ak Bars Kazan | KHL | 6 | 0 | 0 | 0 | 4 | 4 | 0 | 0 | 0 | 6 |
| KHL totals | | | 452 | 79 | 96 | 175 | 441 | 103 | 9 | 24 | 33 | 99 |
| Russia totals | | | 336 | 35 | 53 | 88 | 409 | 13 | 3 | 0 | 3 | 12 |
