= Igor Mirnov =

Russian ice hockey player

- Born: September 15, 1984 (age 41) Chita, Soviet Union
- Height: 6 ft 1 in (185 cm)
- Weight: 205 lb (93 kg; 14 st 9 lb)
- Position: Centre
- Shot: Left
- VHL team Former teams: Buran Voronezh; Dynamo Moscow; Metallurg Magnitogorsk; Atlant Moscow Oblast; MVD Balashikha; Sibir Novosibirsk; Salavat Yulaev Ufa; Ak Bars Kazan; Traktor Chelyabinsk; Spartak Moscow
- NHL draft: 67th overall, 2003; Ottawa Senators
- Playing career: 2001–2019

Igor Sergeyevich Mirnov (b: September 19, 1984) is a Russian professional ice hockey player who is currently playing with Buran Voronezh of the Supreme Hockey League (VHL).

== Playing career ==
Born in Moscow, Mirnov developed in the HC Dynamo Moscow hockey system. The young prospect rose up through Dynamo ranks with NHL star Alexander Ovechkin and became the club's leader after Ovechkin's departure for the NHL. Mirnov was drafted by the Ottawa Senators during the 2003 NHL entry draft. Since the draft he established himself as a Super League elite scorer with HC Dynamo, even becoming the club's captain for the beginning of the 2007-08 season. That season he struggled with the club and was transferred to HC Metallurg (Magnitogorsk), where he once again found his scoring touch.

== Career statistics ==
=== Regular season and playoffs ===
			Regular season					Playoffs
Season	Team	League	GP	G	A	Pts	PIM	GP	G	A	Pts	PIM
2000–01	Dynamo–2 Moscow	RUS.3	18	14	4	18	16	—	—	—	—	—
2001–02	Dynamo Moscow	RSL	6	0	0	0	0	—	—	—	—	—
2001–02	Dynamo–2 Moscow	RUS.3	30	33	17	50	34	—	—	—	—	—
2002–03	Dynamo Moscow	RSL	50	3	7	10	49	5	0	0	0	2
2002–03	Dynamo–2 Moscow	RUS.3	4	7	2	9	4	—	—	—	—	—
2003–04	Dynamo Moscow	RSL	53	11	10	21	26	3	0	0	0	2
2003–04	Dynamo–2 Moscow	RUS.3	1	0	0	0	0	—	—	—	—	—
2004–05	Dynamo Moscow	RSL	55	13	13	26	50	9	2	4	6	0
2004–05	Dynamo–2 Moscow	RUS.3	1	1	0	1	0	—	—	—	—	—
2005–06	Dynamo Moscow	RSL	32	8	10	18	36	4	0	2	2	4
2006–07	Dynamo Moscow	RSL	49	21	25	46	54	3	2	1	3	4
2007–08	Dynamo Moscow	RSL	24	3	3	6	16	—	—	—	—	—
2007–08	Dynamo–2 Moscow	RUS.3	6	6	6	12	29	—	—	—	—	—
2007–08	Metallurg Magnitogorsk	RSL	23	9	6	15	20	13	3	1	4	4
2008–09	Metallurg Magnitogorsk	KHL	39	10	8	18	24	11	2	7	9	8
2009–10	Atlant Moscow Oblast	KHL	20	2	4	6	0	—	—	—	—	—
2009–10	HC MVD	KHL	10	1	3	4	4	—	—	—	—	—
2009–10	Sibir Novosibirsk	KHL	12	7	5	12	8	—	—	—	—	—
2010–11	Sibir Novosibirsk	KHL	53	16	25	41	30	4	0	2	2	2
2011–12	Salavat Yulaev Ufa	KHL	50	14	10	24	14	5	0	1	1	6
2012–13	Salavat Yulaev Ufa	KHL	49	21	16	37	32	14	2	3	5	2
2013–14	Salavat Yulaev Ufa	KHL	48	18	13	31	14	18	8	2	10	0
2014–15	Ak Bars Kazan	KHL	57	10	20	30	14	20	2	6	8	10
2015–16	Ak Bars Kazan	KHL	37	7	7	14	16	1	0	0	0	0
2016–17	Traktor Chelyabinsk	KHL	17	1	4	5	2	—	—	—	—	—
2016–17	Spartak Moscow	KHL	35	8	6	14	14	—	—	—	—	—
2017–18	Spartak Moscow	KHL	32	6	8	14	31	—	—	—	—	—
2017–18	Khimik Voskresensk	VHL	2	1	0	1	2	—	—	—	—	—
2018–19	Buran Voronezh	VHL	39	15	17	32	26	—	—	—	—	—
RSL totals			290	68	75	143	251	37	7	8	15	16
KHL totals			459	121	129	250	203	73	14	21	35	28

=== International ===
Year	Team	Event	GP	G	A	Pts	PIM
2001	Russia	U17	5	3	3	6	4
Junior totals			5	3	3	6	4
