= Filip Šindelář =

Czech ice hockey player

Filip Sindelar
- Born: October 30, 1979 (age 45); Vlašim, Czechoslovakia
- Height: 5 ft 10 in (178 cm)
- Weight: 179 lb (81 kg; 12 st 11 lb)
- Position: Goaltender
- Caught: Right
- Played for: HC Sparta Praha; MHK Dubnica; HC Bílí Tygři Liberec; BK Mladá Boleslav; HC Vítkovice
- Playing career: 1999–2017

Filip Šindelář (born October 30, 1979) is a Czech former professional ice hockey goaltender.

Šindelář played in the Czech Extraliga for HC Sparta Praha, HC Bílí Tygři Liberec, BK Mladá Boleslav and HC Vítkovice. He also played in the Tipsport Liga for MHK Dubnica during the 2004–05 season.
