= Jonathan Bernier =

Canadian ice hockey player (born 1988)

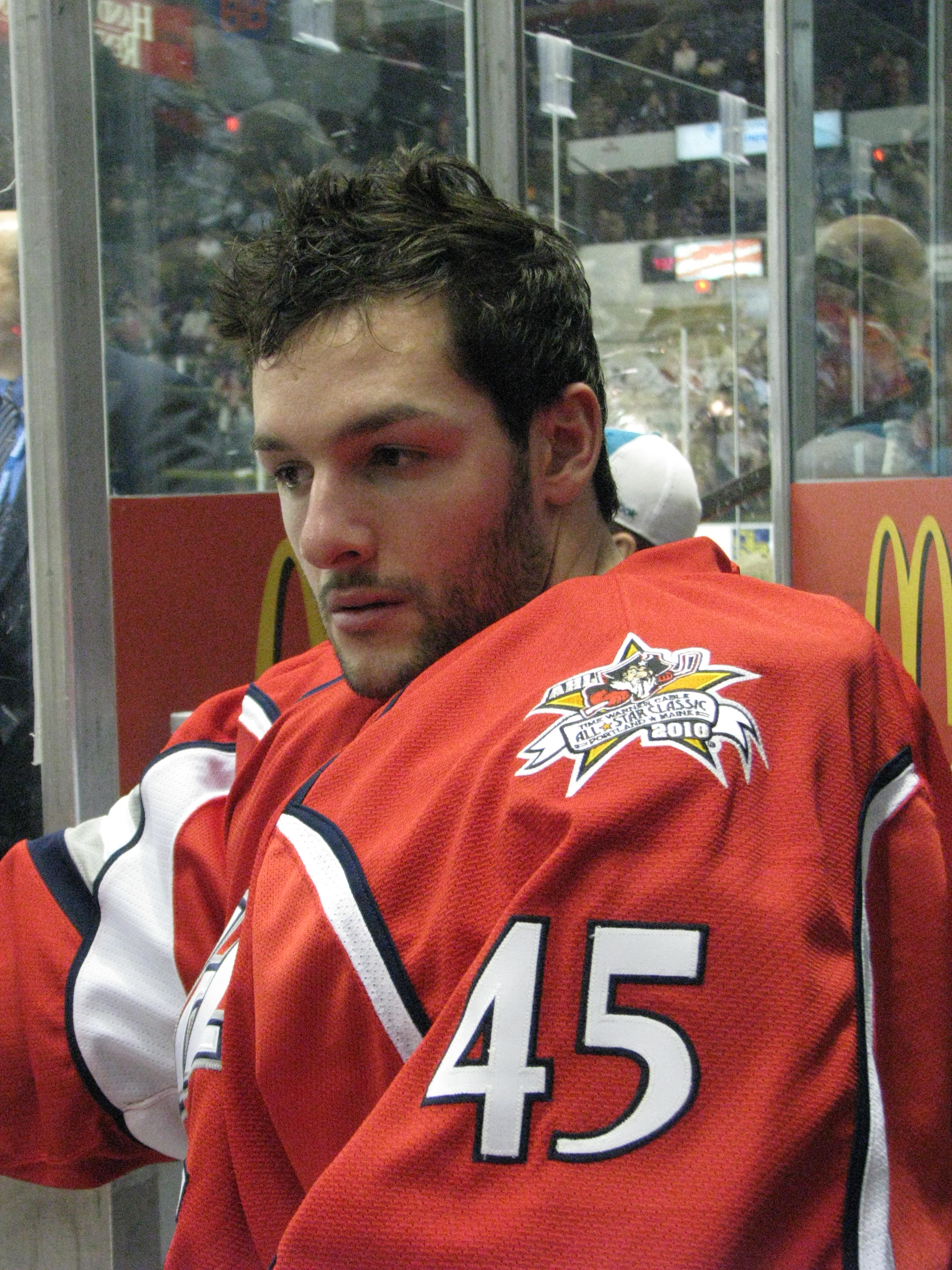
- Bernier at the 2010 AHL All-Star Game
- Born: August 7, 1988 (age 37) Laval, Quebec, Canada
- Height: 6 ft 0 in (183 cm)
- Weight: 184 lb (83 kg; 13 st 2 lb)
- Position: Goaltender
- Caught: Left
- Played for: Los Angeles Kings; Toronto Maple Leafs; Anaheim Ducks; Colorado Avalanche; Detroit Red Wings; New Jersey Devils
- National team: Canada
- NHL draft: 11th overall, 2006; Los Angeles Kings
- Playing career: 2007–2021

Jonathan Bernier (born August 7, 1988) is a Canadian former professional ice hockey goaltender who played 14 seasons in the National Hockey League (NHL). He was drafted in the first round, 11th overall, of the 2006 NHL entry draft by the Los Angeles Kings, with whom he spent his first four NHL seasons. He subsequently played for the Toronto Maple Leafs, Anaheim Ducks, Colorado Avalanche, Detroit Red Wings, and New Jersey Devils. Bernier won the Stanley Cup as the backup goalie with the Kings in 2012.

== Playing career ==
During his youth, Bernier played in the 2001 Quebec International Pee-Wee Hockey Tournament with a minor ice hockey team from Laval, Quebec.

=== Junior ===
Bernier's junior career was spent entirely with the Lewiston Maineiacs in the Quebec Major Junior Hockey League (QMJHL). The first goal scored on him in the QMJHL was by his brother, Marc-André Bernier, at the Halifax Metro Centre on September 24, 2004. Bernier was drafted by the Los Angeles Kings in the first round, 11th overall in the 2006 NHL Entry Draft but returned to Lewiston for the 2006–07 season. That season, Bernier won the President's Cup with the Maineiacs.

=== Professional ===
==== Los Angeles Kings ====
On September 29, 2007, Bernier made his NHL debut in the Kings' season opener against the Anaheim Ducks, which was played in London. He allowed one goal on 27 shots, earning the first win of his career by the final score of 4–1, and was named the second star of the game. He played a total of four games that season in the NHL before being sent back to the Lewiston Maineiacs in the QMJHL to develop, finishing his season in the NHL with a record of 1–3.

After aging out of the QMJHL and the success of Kings' goaltender Jonathan Quick during Bernier's absence, he was sent to the Kings' American Hockey League (AHL) affiliate, the Manchester Monarchs for the 2008–09 season. He played 54 games in his first full-time season, ending the season with a record of 23–24–4 and a .914 save percentage.

The following season, Bernier returned to Manchester as their starting goaltender. He was selected for the 2010 AHL All-Star Game, for Team Canada. In March 2010, Bernier was recalled to the Kings while Quick attended the birth of his first child. On March 12, 2010, Bernier made his season debut in a 2–1 shootout victory against the Dallas Stars, stopping six shots in the shootout. In the next game he started, Bernier recorded his first career shutout against the Nashville Predators on March 30, 2010.

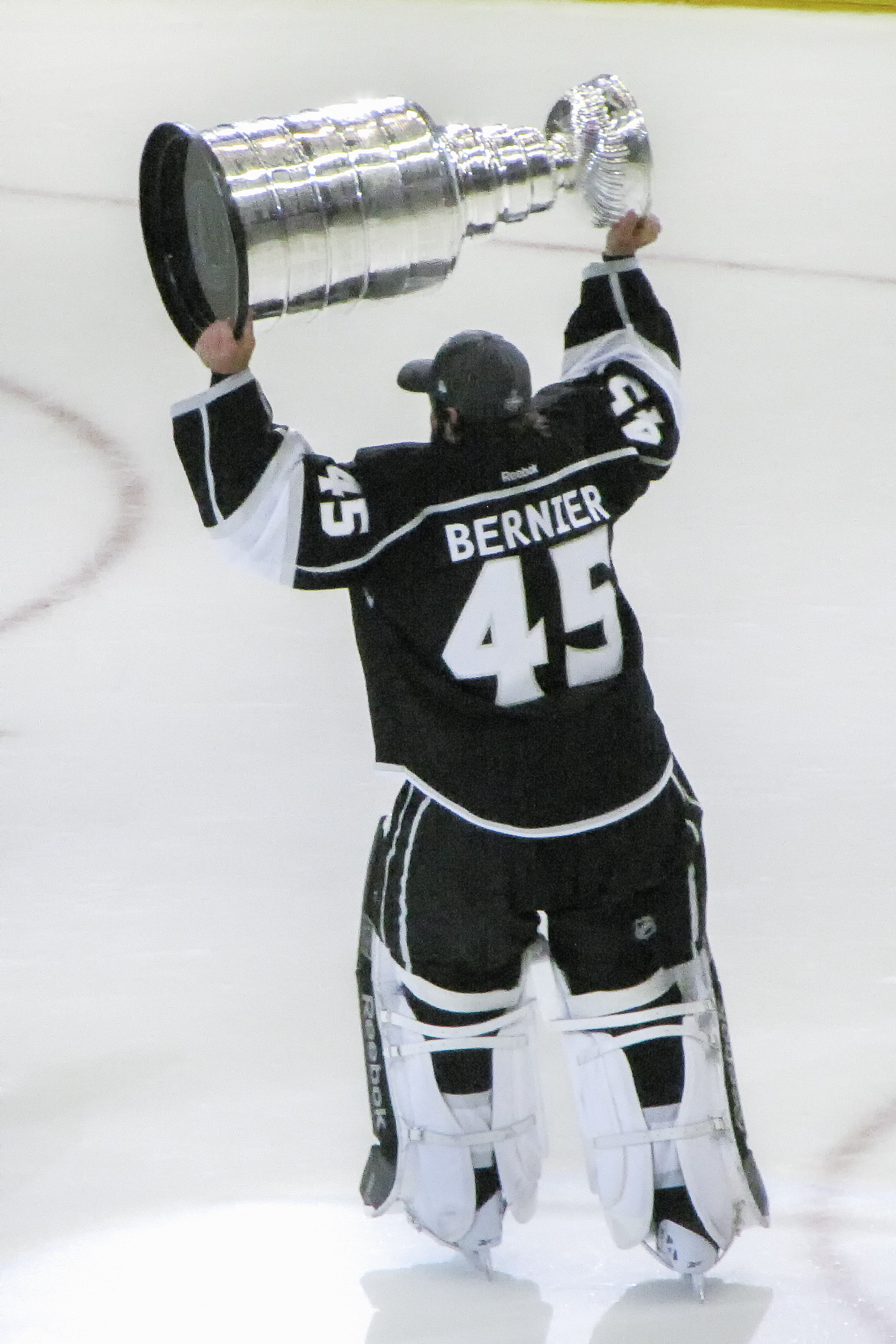
Bernier holding the Stanley Cup after the Kings victory in 2012

After an 8–3 victory against the Vancouver Canucks on April 1, 2010, Bernier was sent back down to Manchester in preparation for the Calder Cup playoffs. Bernier played in every post-season game for the Monarchs, who made it to the Eastern Conference Finals. Manchester lost the series 4–2 against the Hershey Bears, who later went on to win the Calder Cup.

Bernier spent the following three seasons as the backup goaltender for the Kings behind Jonathan Quick. In 2012, the Kings reached the Stanley Cup Final against the New Jersey Devils, which the Kings won 4–2. Despite being an unused backup throughout the playoffs, Bernier's name was engraved on the Stanley Cup. He started 14 games for the Kings during the 2012–13 season. On April 4, 2013, Bernier recorded a shutout in a 3–0 victory against the Minnesota Wild. He ended his stint with the Los Angeles Kings with a record of 29–18–6.

==== Toronto Maple Leafs ====
On June 23, 2013, Bernier was traded to the Toronto Maple Leafs in exchange for forward Matt Frattin, goaltender Ben Scrivens, and a second-round draft pick that Los Angeles had the option to use in either 2014 or 2015.

In a pre-season game on September 22, 2013 against the Buffalo Sabres, Bernier engaged in a goalie fight with Sabres goaltender Ryan Miller. The Leafs went on to win the game 5–3. It was Bernier's first fight in a professional game.

The early part of the 2013–14 season saw Bernier and James Reimer split playing time; however, as the season progressed, Bernier cemented himself as the starting goaltender. On March 14, in his first return to Los Angeles, Bernier played one period before leaving with a lower body injury. He missed five games due to this injury, during which the Maple Leafs went 0–5. On April 3, during a last minute push for a playoff berth, Bernier suffered another lower body injury against the Boston Bruins which required surgery. Reimer replaced Bernier for the rest of the season, but the Maple Leafs were unable to make the playoffs.

In December 2014, Bernier drew media attention when he mistakenly described former South African president and anti-apartheid leader Nelson Mandela as "one of the most known athletes in the world" while attending a charity event commemorating Mandela in Toronto. Bernier later apologized, stating he was embarrassed by the error and had meant to praise Mandela's humanitarian contributions.

==== Anaheim Ducks ====
With one year remaining on his contract, Bernier was traded by the Maple Leafs to the Anaheim Ducks in exchange for a conditional pick in the 2017 NHL entry draft on July 8, 2016 (the conditions were not met). Reunited with Ducks head coach Randy Carlyle, who had been Bernier's coach in the early part of his time with the Maple Leafs, he assumed the backup goaltender duties behind John Gibson for the 2016–17 season. Bernier made his Ducks debut in a 3–2 defeat to the reigning champions, the Pittsburgh Penguins, on October 15, 2016. He collected his first win with the Ducks in a 4–1 result over the Calgary Flames on November 6, 2016.

Bernier filled in for an injured Gibson as the starting goaltender in the final stages of the regular season. Bernier went 13 straight games without a regulation loss during the regular season. He finished the regular season having played in 39 games, winning 21 of them. He recorded two shutouts in this during the season, shutting out the Arizona Coyotes on January 14 and the Chicago Blackhawks on March 9. Gibson returned to the starting role in time for the playoffs. Bernier made his first playoff appearance for the Ducks in the third game against the Calgary Flames, when he replaced Gibson mid-game in 5–4 comeback victory. His next appearance in the playoffs was in the Western Conference Finals, when Gibson was injured in 3–1 defeat to the Nashville Predators on May 20, 2017. Bernier made his first career playoff start the following game in Game 6, but allowed 4 goals in 16 shots as the Ducks were eliminated on May 22, 2017.

==== Colorado Avalanche ====
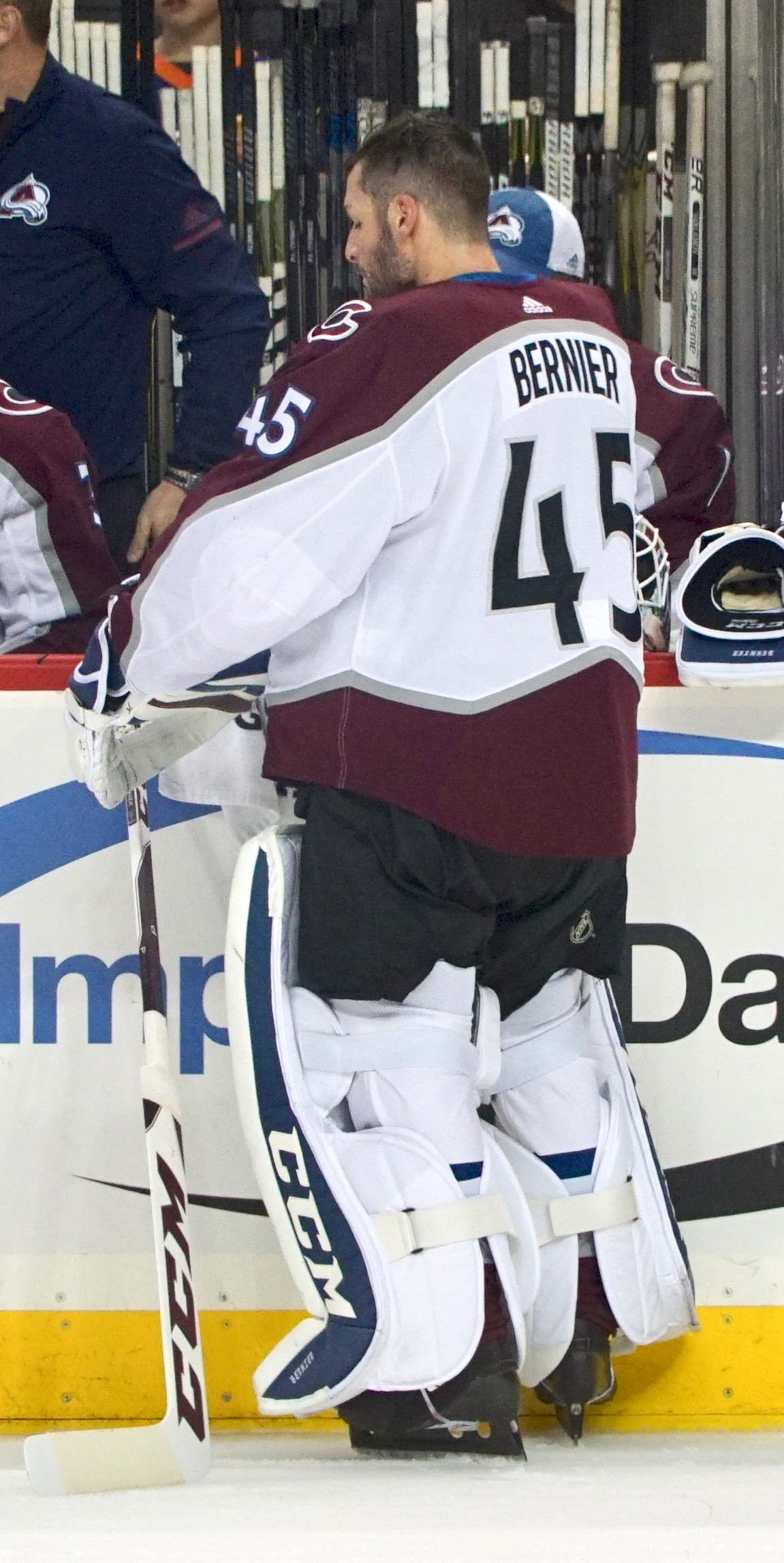
Bernier with the Colorado Avalanche in 2017

Bernier's contract with the Ducks expired on 1 July 2017, leaving him an unrestricted free agent. The same day, he signed a one-year, $2.75 million contract with the Colorado Avalanche. However, his 2017–18 season with the Avalanche was riddled with injuries. Bernier suffered an upper body injury on October 25, 2017, in a game against the San Jose Sharks, and a head injury on February 16, 2018, which caused him to miss 10 games. Shortly after returning, he suffered a second head injury on March 10, 2018, in a game against the Arizona Coyotes, and in late March an infection kept him out for three games. The Avalanche made the 2018 Stanley Cup playoffs, where Bernier started Game 1 against the Nashville Predators due to an injury to first-choice goaltender Semyon Varlamov. Bernier was himself injured in Game 4 and was replaced by Andrew Hammond in the third period. Hammond started the following two games as the Avalanche were eliminated in six games.

==== Detroit Red Wings ====
With his contract again expiring in the summer, Bernier left the Avalanche as a free agent. He agreed to a three-year, $9 million contract with the Detroit Red Wings on July 1, 2018. In Detroit, he became the backup to starting goaltender Jimmy Howard. On November 8, 2019, in a game against the Boston Bruins, Bernier recorded two assists, becoming the first Red Wings goalie to do so since Jim Rutherford in 1979.

==== New Jersey Devils and retirement ====
On July 22, 2021, as a pending unrestricted free agent, Bernier was traded by the Red Wings after three seasons with the team to the Carolina Hurricanes, along with a third-round pick, in exchange for Alex Nedeljkovic. Unable to agree to terms with the Hurricanes, on July 28, 2021, Bernier signed as a free agent a two-year, $8.25 million contract with the New Jersey Devils.

After missing the majority of the 2021–22 season and the entirety of the 2022–23 season due to injury, Bernier officially announced his retirement on August 21, 2023.

== International play ==
Medal record

Representing Canada

Ice hockey

World Junior Championships
Gold medal – first place	2008 Czech Republic	

Spengler Cup
Gold medal – first place	2012 Davos	

Bernier represented Team Canada's under-18 team at the 2006 IIHF World U18 Championships in April, which was held in Sweden. Canada finished fourth at the tournament.

Bernier was invited to the 2007 World Junior Ice Hockey Championships selection camp, but lost out to Montreal Canadiens' prospect Carey Price and Calgary Flames' prospect Leland Irving.

Along with Steve Mason, Bernier was chosen as one of Team Canada's goaltenders for the 2008 World Junior Ice Hockey Championships, held in the Czech Republic, in which he finished with a 1–1 record and a 2.00 GAA as Canada won the gold medal over Sweden.

During the 2012–13 NHL lock-out, Bernier represented Team Canada at the 2012 Spengler Cup, winning a gold medal in the final over Swiss club HC Davos.

== Personal life ==
Bernier married Martine Forget, a Canadian model, on July 23, 2016. They have two sons, Tyler (born August 2014) and Brady (born April 2019), and a daughter, Ivy (born December 2020). Bernier was a groomsman at the wedding of Meghan Agosta and Marco Marciano, the goaltending coach of the Blainville-Boisbriand Armada of the QMJHL on August 31, 2012.

Bernier's older brother, Marc-André Bernier, was selected in the second round of the 2003 NHL entry draft by the Vancouver Canucks.

== Career statistics ==
=== Regular season and playoffs ===
			Regular season									Playoffs
Season	Team	League	GP	W	L	OTL	MIN	GA	SO	GAA	SV%	GP	W	L	MIN	GA	SO	GAA	SV%
2004–05	Lewiston Maineiacs	QMJHL	23	7	12	3	1,353	67	0	2.97	.907	1	0	0	20	0	0	0.00	1.000
2005–06	Lewiston Maineiacs	QMJHL	54	27	26	0	3,241	146	2	2.70	.908	6	2	4	359	17	1	2.84	.914
2006–07	Lewiston Maineiacs	QMJHL	37	26	10	0	2,186	94	2	2.58	.905	17	16	1	1,025	40	1	2.34	.919
2007–08	Los Angeles Kings	NHL	4	1	3	0	238	16	0	4.03	.864	—	—	—	—	—	—	—	—
2007–08	Lewiston Maineiacs	QMJHL	34	18	12	3	2,024	92	0	2.73	.908	6	2	4	348	17	0	2.93	.918
2007–08	Manchester Monarchs	AHL	3	1	1	1	184	5	0	1.63	.946	3	0	3	195	9	0	2.76	.908
2008–09	Manchester Monarchs	AHL	54	23	24	4	3,101	124	5	2.40	.910	—	—	—	—	—	—	—	—
2009–10	Manchester Monarchs	AHL	58	30	21	6	3,424	116	9	2.03	.936	16	10	6	996	30	3	1.81	.939
2009–10	Los Angeles Kings	NHL	3	3	0	0	185	4	1	1.30	.957	—	—	—	—	—	—	—	—
2010–11	Los Angeles Kings	NHL	25	11	8	3	1,378	57	3	2.48	.913	—	—	—	—	—	—	—	—
2011–12	Los Angeles Kings	NHL	16	5	6	2	890	35	1	2.36	.909	—	—	—	—	—	—	—	—
2012–13	Heilbronner Falken	2.GBun	13	6	7	0	792	34	1	2.57	—	—	—	—	—	—	—	—	—
2012–13	Los Angeles Kings	NHL	14	9	3	1	768	24	1	1.88	.922	1	0	0	30	0	0	0.00	1.000
2013–14	Toronto Maple Leafs	NHL	55	26	19	7	3,084	138	1	2.68	.923	—	—	—	—	—	—	—	—
2014–15	Toronto Maple Leafs	NHL	58	21	28	7	3,177	152	2	2.87	.912	—	—	—	—	—	—	—	—
2015–16	Toronto Maple Leafs	NHL	38	12	21	3	2,147	103	3	2.88	.908	—	—	—	—	—	—	—	—
2015–16	Toronto Marlies	AHL	4	3	0	1	240	5	3	1.25	.948	—	—	—	—	—	—	—	—
2016–17	Anaheim Ducks	NHL	39	21	7	4	1,994	83	2	2.50	.915	4	1	2	183	10	0	3.28	.873
2017–18	Colorado Avalanche	NHL	37	19	13	3	2,002	95	2	2.85	.913	4	1	3	218	14	0	3.87	.883
2018–19	Detroit Red Wings	NHL	35	9	18	5	1,860	98	1	3.16	.904	—	—	—	—	—	—	—	—
2019–20	Detroit Red Wings	NHL	46	15	22	3	2,566	126	1	2.95	.907	—	—	—	—	—	—	—	—
2020–21	Detroit Red Wings	NHL	24	9	11	1	1,307	65	0	2.99	.914	—	—	—	—	—	—	—	—
2021–22	New Jersey Devils	NHL	10	4	4	1	511	26	0	3.06	.902	—	—	—	—	—	—	—	—
NHL totals			404	165	163	40	22,105	1,022	18	2.77	.912	9	2	5	430	24	0	3.35	.885

=== International ===
Year	Team	Event	Result	GP	W	L	OT	MIN	GA	SO	GAA	SV%
2005	Canada Quebec	U17	9th	4	0	4	0	230	21	0	4.02	.885
2006	Canada	WJC18	4th	7	3	3	1	420	12	1	1.71	.942
2008	Canada	WJC	1st place, gold medalist(s)	2	1	1	0	120	4	1	2.00	.947
2011	Canada	WC	5th	3	2	1	0	179	6	0	2.01	.917
Junior totals				13	4	8	1	770	37	2	2.88	.915
Senior totals				3	2	1	0	179	6	0	2.01	.917

== Awards and honours ==
Award	Year
QMJHL
CHL Top Prospects Game	2006
Second All-Star Team	2007
Guy Lafleur Trophy	2007
President's Cup champion	2007
CHL Second All-Star Team	2007
AHL
All-Star Game	2010
First All-Star Team	2010
Aldege "Baz" Bastien Memorial Award	2010
NHL
Stanley Cup champion	2012
International
WJC18 All-Star Team	2006
Spengler Cup champion	2012

Awards and achievements
Preceded by Anže Kopitar	Los Angeles Kings first-round draft pick 2006	Succeeded by Trevor Lewis
Preceded by Cory Schneider	Aldege "Baz" Bastien Memorial Award; 2009–10	Succeeded by Brad Thiessen
