= 2019–20 Swiss League season =

- League: Swiss League
- Sport: Ice hockey
- Duration: September 13, 2019 – February 15, 2020
- Games: 264
- Teams: 12

Regular Season
- Season Champions: EHC Kloten

Playoffs

Swiss League champion

Swiss League seasons
- ← 2018–19 2020–21 →

The 2019–20 Swiss League season was the 73rd season of Switzerland's second tier hockey league.

The season was affected by the 2020 coronavirus outbreak in Switzerland. On March 13, 2020, the league decided to cancel the end of the playoffs due to the coronavirus pandemic and the measures put in place by the Swiss government. Only the quarter-finals had been played before this decision.

== Teams ==
Swiss League teams for the 2019–20 season

Team	City	Arena	Capacity
HC Ajoie	Porrentruy	Patinoire de Porrentruy	4,300
Bellinzona Rockets	Biasca	Pista Ghiaccio Biasca	3,800
HC La Chaux-de-Fonds	La Chaux-de-Fonds	Patinoire des Mélèzes	7,200
GCK Lions	Küsnacht	Eishalle Küsnacht	2,800
EHC Kloten	Kloten	Stimo Arena	7,624
SC Langenthal	Langenthal	Schoren Halle	4,320
EHC Olten	Olten	Kleinholz Stadion	6,500
HC Sierre	Sierre	Patinoire de Graben	4,500
Hockey Thurgau	Weinfelden	Güttingersreuti	3,100
EHC Visp	Visp	Lonza Arena	5,150
EHC Winterthur	Winterthur	Zielbau Arena	3,000
EVZ Academy	Zug	Bossard Arena	1,500

== Regular season ==
The regular season started on 13 September 2019 and ended on 15 February 2020.

Pos	Team	Pld	W	OTW	OTL	L	GF	GA	GD	Pts	Qualification
1	EHC Kloten	44	26	8	1	9	173	81	+92	95	Advance to Playoffs
2	HC Ajoie	44	28	4	3	9	185	105	+80	95	Advance to Playoffs
3	EHC Olten	44	28	3	3	10	179	106	+73	93	Advance to Playoffs
4	EHC Visp	44	26	2	2	14	144	102	+42	84	Advance to Playoffs
5	Hockey Thurgau	44	22	5	4	13	112	104	+8	80	Advance to Playoffs
6	SC Langenthal	44	24	2	0	18	144	122	+22	76	Advance to Playoffs
7	HC La Chaux-de-Fonds	44	19	2	3	20	146	141	+5	64	Advance to Pre-Playoffs
8	GCK Lions	44	16	3	5	20	136	144	−8	59	Advance to Pre-Playoffs
9	HC Sierre	44	12	4	1	27	109	158	−49	45	Advance to Pre-Playoffs
10	EVZ Academy	44	12	1	5	26	103	170	−67	43	Advance to Pre-Playoffs
11	EHC Winterthur	44	10	0	1	33	101	207	−106	31	
12	Bellinzona Rockets	44	6	1	7	30	100	192	−92	27	

Source: Swiss League
Rules for classification: 1) points; 2) a highest number of points obtained during direct confrontations; 3) goal difference; 4) number of goals scored; 5) goal difference during direct confrontations; 6) number of goals scored during direct confrontations; 7) number of goals scored in away games; 8) number of goals scored in away games during direct confrontations.

=== Statistics ===
==== Scoring leaders ====
The following shows the top ten players who led the league in points, at the conclusion of the regular season. If two or more skaters are tied (i.e. same number of points, goals and played games), all of the tied skaters are shown.

Player	Team	GP	G	A	Pts	+/–	PIM
(Canada) Philip-Michaël Devos	HC Ajoie	44	30	68	98	+56	2
(Canada) Jonathan Hazen	HC Ajoie	38	39	44	83	+54	32
(Canada) Éric Faille	EHC Kloten	41	19	50	69	+35	8
(Canada) Dion Knelsen	EHC Olten	42	27	33	60	+35	51
(Canada) Troy Josephs	EHC Visp	41	21	36	57	+23	101
(United States) Tim Coffman	HC La Chaux-de-Fonds	43	18	38	56	+8	37
(Canada) Guillaume Asselin	HC Sierre	43	24	29	53	-11	43
(Canada) Garry Nunn	EHC Olten	40	30	22	52	+40	12
(United States) Ryan Hayes	GCK Lions	44	27	25	52	+2	30
(United States) Mark Van Guilder	EHC Visp	41	31	20	51	+25	22

==== Leading goaltenders ====
The following shows the top five goaltenders who led the league in goals against average, provided that they have played at least 40% of their team's minutes, at the conclusion of the regular season.

Player	Team(s)	GP	TOI	GA	Sv%	GAA
(Switzerland) Dominic Nyffeler	EHC Kloten	40	2412:16	75	91.91	1.87
(Switzerland) Janick Schwendener	HC Thurgau	26	1516:55	50	91.68	1.98
(Switzerland) Silas Matthys	EHC Olten	20	1180:10	39	92.26	1.98
(Switzerland) Reto Lory	EHC Visp	36	2126:52	76	92.13	2.14
(Switzerland) Tim Wolf	HC Ajoie	33	1918:48	73	90.68	2.28

== Playoffs ==
On March 13, 2020, the league decided to cancel the playoffs due to the coronavirus pandemic and the measures put in place by the Swiss government. Only the quarter-finals had been played before this decision.

=== Bracket ===
Quarter-Finals
1	EHC Kloten	4
8	GCK Lions	1
2	HC Ajoie	4
7	HC La Chaux-de-Fonds	1
(Pairings are reseeded after the first round)
3	EHC Olten	1
6	SC Langenthal	4
4	EHC Visp	4
5	Hockey Thurgau	1

Semi-Finals
1	EHC Kloten
6	SC Langenthal
2	HC Ajoie
4	EHC Visp

Finals

=== Quarter-Finals ===
==== (1) EHC Kloten vs. (8) GCK Lions ====
19 February	EHC Kloten	1-4	GCK Lions	Stimo Arena, Kloten	Recap
Faille (Figren) - 6:49		First period	13:18 - Chiquet (Hayes)
No scoring		Second period	0:26 - Fuhrer (Riedi, Hayes)
No scoring		Third period	19:03 - Hayes (EN); 19:43 - Sigrist (Rizzello) (EN)
Dominic Nyffeler ( 29 saves / 31 shots )		Goalie stats	Wolfgang Zürrer ( 36 saves / 37 shots )

21 February	GCK Lions	2-7	EHC Kloten	Eishalle Küsnacht, Küsnacht	Recap
2:31 - Berri (Hardmeier, Puide)		First period	Figren (Faille, Knellwolf) (PP1) - 13:03
19:00 - Chiquet (Backman, Büsser) (PP1)		Second period	Lehmann (Ganz, Janett) - 11:28; Faille (Ganz, Figren) - 14:07
No scoring		Third period	Knellwolf (Figren, Faille) - 4:21; Forget (Wetli, Truttmann) - 5:42; Lehmann (Truttmann, Harlacher) - 9:08; Janett (Obrist, Lemm) - 12:56
Wolfgang Zürrer ( 17 saves / 23 shots ) Robin Zumbühl ( 4 saves / 5 shots )		Goalie stats	Dominic Nyffeler ( 25 saves / 27 shots )

23 February	EHC Kloten	4-3	OT	GCK Lions	Stimo Arena, Kloten	Recap
Truttmann (Steiner) - 17:31		First period		No scoring
Ganz (Knellwolf, Janett) - 4:24		Second period		2:17 - Hayes (Berri, Hardmeier); 5:50 - Andersson (Hayes); 16:50 - Rizzello (Geiger, Suter) (PP1)
Lemm (Lehmann, Obrist) - 6:53		Third period		No scoring
Lehmann (Knellwolf, Faille) - 0:30		First overtime period		No scoring
Dominic Nyffeler ( 11 saves / 14 shots )		Goalie stats		Wolfgang Zürrer ( 32 saves / 36 shots )

26 February	GCK Lions	1-6	EHC Kloten	Eishalle Küsnacht, Küsnacht	Recap
11:00 - Riedi (Fuhrer, Büsser)		First period	Knellwolf (Steiner, Figren) - 10:31
No scoring		Second period	Figren (Kindschi, Faille) (PP1) - 5:06; Forget (Obrist, Lehmann) - 5:45; Obrist (Lehmann, Harlacher) - 8:33; Forget (Marchon) - 9:25
No scoring		Third period	Lehmann (Obrist) - 17:39
Wolfgang Zürrer ( 16 saves / 21 shots ) Robin Zumbühl ( 11 saves / 12 shots )		Goalie stats	Dominic Nyffeler ( 25 saves / 26 shots )

28 February	EHC Kloten	3-2	GCK Lions	Stimo Arena, Kloten	Recap
No scoring		First period	Suter (Rizzello, Backman) - 11:54
Krakauskas (Ganz, Füglister) - 9:19; Ganz (Lemm, Truttmann) (PP1) - 11:40; Marchon (Truttmann, Forget) - 17:19		Second period	Fuhrer (Rizzello, Geiger) - 3:40
No scoring		Third period	No scoring
Dominic Nyffeler ( 24 saves / 26 shots )		Goalie stats	Wolfgang Zürrer ( 34 saves / 37 shots )

EHC Kloten won the series 4–1

==== (2) HC Ajoie vs. (7) HC La Chaux-de-Fonds ====
19 February	HC Ajoie	6-2	HC La Chaux-de-Fonds	Patinoire de Porrentruy, Porrentruy	Recap
Huber (Privet, Muller) - 1:27; Hazen (Devos, Ryser) - 3:12		First period	No scoring
Carbis (Barbero, Coffman) - 1:59; Carbis (Cameron) - 14:57		Second period	6:40 - Thibaudeau (Muller, Frossard); 16:07 - Privet (Thibaudeau, Pilet)
Staiger (Casserini) - 7:50; Devos (Schmutz) - 18:30		Third period	No scoring
Tim Wolf ( 32 saves / 34 shots )		Goalie stats	Matteo Ritz ( 29 saves / 35 shots )

21 February	HC La Chaux-de-Fonds	2-1	HC Ajoie	Patinoire des Mélèzes, La Chaux-de-Fonds	Recap
9:59 - Coffman (Carbis, Miéville) (PP1)		First period	No scoring
No scoring		Second period	Frossard - 14:24
1:51 - Coffman (Miéville, Cameron) (PP2)		Third period	No scoring
Matteo Ritz ( 32 saves / 33 shots )		Goalie stats	Tim Wolf ( 27 saves / 29 shots )

23 February	HC Ajoie	4-2	HC La Chaux-de-Fonds	Patinoire de Porrentruy, Porrentruy	Recap
No scoring		First period	No scoring
Devos (Hauert, Hazen) (PP1) - 3:51; Mäder (Schmutz, Ryser) (PP1) - 10:33		Second period	5:03 - Grezet (Bogdanoff)
Privet (Huber, Dotti) - 2:37; Thibaudeau (PP1) - 19:14		Third period	19:06 - Jaquet (Carbis) (SH1)
Tim Wolf ( 30 saves / 32 shots )		Goalie stats	Matteo Ritz ( 46 saves / 50 shots )

26 February	HC La Chaux-de-Fonds	3-9	HC Ajoie	Patinoire des Mélèzes, La Chaux-de-Fonds	Recap
Coffman (Cameron, Iglesias) - 8:30; Dubois (Schmidt, Hofmann) - 16:29		First period	1:20 - Thibaudeau (Frossard, Joggi)
No scoring		Second period	5:29 - Devos; 8:34 - Schmutz (Devos, Hazen); 16:40 - Staiger (Macquat, Dotti) (SH1)
Carbis (Coffman) - 0:04		Third period	0:33 - Hazen (Birbaum); 11:39 - Huber (Dotti, Staiger); 14:14 - Huber (Ryser, Privet); 14:58 - Hazen; 19:53 - Casserini (Privet, Dotti) (SH1)
Matteo Ritz ( 19 saves / 26 shots ) Marco Mathis ( 0 saves / 2 shots )		Goalie stats	Tim Wolf ( 36 saves / 39 shots )

28 February	HC Ajoie	7-3	HC La Chaux-de-Fonds	Patinoire de Porrentruy, Porrentruy	Recap
Joggi (Ryser, Devos) (PP2) - 13:23; Hazen (Devos, Schmutz) - 18:48		First period	2:48 - Coffman (Cameron, Bogdanoff)
Huber (Privet, Staiger) - 9:26; Joggi (Devos, Hazen) (PP1) - 18:36		Second period	16:33 - Hofmann (Augsburger)
Devos (Frossard, Joggi) (PP1) - 2:36; Thibaudeau - 2:52; Mäder (Ryser, Arnold) - 14:48		Third period	7:04 - Cameron (Miéville) (PP1)
Tim Wolf ( 34 saves / 37 shots )		Goalie stats	Matteo Ritz ( 17 saves / 23 shots ) Marco Mathis ( 8 saves / 9 shots )

HC Ajoie won the series 4–1

==== (3) EHC Olten vs. (6) SC Langenthal ====
19 February	EHC Olten	4-5	OT	SC Langenthal	Kleinholz Stadion, Olten	Recap
Wyss (Lanz, Rudolf) - 3:53; Horanský (Rouiller, Knelsen) (PP1) - 7:49		First period		5:11 - Benik (Küng)
Nunn (PS) - 15:11		Second period		2:28 - Kläy (Derungs, Weber); 4:48 - Kummer (Küng, Benik); 15:41 - Clark (Tschannen, Sterchi)
Knelsen (SH1) - 12:38		Third period		No scoring
No scoring		First overtime period		1:13 - Kummer (Küng, Benik)
Simon Rytz ( 14 saves / 19 shots )		Goalie stats		Philip Wüthrich ( 29 saves / 33 shots )

21 February	SC Langenthal	4-3	3OT	EHC Olten	Schoren Halle, Langenthal	Recap
17:41 - Kummer (Benik, Küng)		First period		Chiriaev (Haas, P. Rytz) (PP1) - 10:20
No scoring		Second period		Chiriaev (Fogstad Vold, Haas) - 1:58
13:39 - Henauer (Maret, Clark); 14:47 - Maret (Küng, Henauer) (PP1)		Third period		Fogstad Vold (Sartori, Lüthi) - 7:42
44:41 - Maret (Suleski, Melnalksnis)		Third overtime period		No scoring
Philip Wüthrich ( 40 saves / 43 shots )		Goalie stats		Simon Rytz ( 45 saves / 49 shots )

23 February	EHC Olten	7-0	SC Langenthal	Kleinholz Stadion, Olten	Recap
Knelsen (Horanský, Schwarzenbach) (PP1) - 5:56; Nunn (Rouiller, Knelsen) (PP1) - 9:53		First period	No scoring
Haas (Sartori, Wyss) - 1:59; Nunn (Knelsen, Lüthi) - 7:01; Nunn (Knelsen, Rouiller) - 12:10; Chiriaev (Schwarzenbach, P. Rytz) - 16:46		Second period	No scoring
Haas (Eigenmann, Chiriaev) - 1:22		Third period	No scoring
Silas Matthys ( 16 saves / 16 shots )		Goalie stats	Philip Wüthrich ( 15 saves / 20 shots ) Connor Hughes ( 13 saves / 15 shots )

26 February	SC Langenthal	4-1	EHC Olten	Schoren Halle, Langenthal	Recap
8:40 - Rüegsegger (Kummer, Küng) (PP1); 15:41 - Rüegsegger (Pienitz)		First period	Rudolf (Haas, Wyss) - 17:52
17:40 - Tschannen (Kummer, Küng)		Second period	No scoring
19:31 - Benik (Küng, Kummer) (EN)		Third period	No scoring
Philip Wüthrich ( 22 saves / 23 shots )		Goalie stats	Silas Matthys ( 30 saves / 33 shots )

28 February	EHC Olten	1-4	SC Langenthal	Kleinholz Stadion, Olten	Recap
No scoring		First period	No scoring
No scoring		Second period	6:09 - Henauer (Clark, Tschannen); 11:14 - Clark (Sterchi, Maret)
Nunn (Knelsen) (PP1) - 7:08		Third period	9:35 - Rüegsegger (Küng, Kummer) (PP1); 19:11 - Pienitz (Küng, Kläy) (EN)
Simon Rytz ( 19 saves / 22 shots )		Goalie stats	Philip Wüthrich ( 32 saves / 33 shots )

SC Langenthal won the series 4–1

==== (4) EHC Visp vs. (5) Hockey Thurgau ====
19 February	EHC Visp	4-1	Hockey Thurgau	Lonza Arena, Visp	Recap
Steiner (Van Guilder) - 17:25; Hofstetter (Heynen, Petrig) - 19:12		First period	No scoring
Steiner - 1:25		Second period	No scoring
Josephs (Dolana, Van Guilder) - 10:27		Third period	18:43 - Merola (PP1)
Reto Lory ( 21 saves / 22 shots )		Goalie stats	Janick Schwendener ( 20 saves / 24 shots )

21 February	Hockey Thurgau	2-1	EHC Visp	Güttingersreuti, Weinfelden	Recap
No scoring		First period	No scoring
9:44 - Rehak (Spiller, Spannring)		Second period	No scoring
2:59 - C. Jones (Merola, K. Jones) (PP1)		Third period	Ranov (Ritz, Furrer) - 12:37
Janick Schwendener ( 23 saves / 24 shots )		Goalie stats	Reto Lory ( 31 saves / 33 shots )

23 February	EHC Visp	2-1	2OT	Hockey Thurgau	Lonza Arena, Visp	Recap
No scoring		First period		No scoring
No scoring		Second period		7:10 - Merola (Brändli, Spannring)
Wiedmer (Nater) - 1:47		Third period		No scoring
Burgener (Furrer) - 25:58		Second overtime period		No scoring
Reto Lory ( 41 saves / 42 shots )		Goalie stats		Janick Schwendener ( 31 saves / 33 shots )

26 February	Hockey Thurgau	4-1	EHC Visp	Güttingersreuti, Weinfelden	Recap
18:20 - Merola (K. Jones) (PP1)		First period	Haueter (Ritz, Berger) - 15:00; Hofstetter (Petrig, Burgener) - 18:46
No scoring		Second period	Wiedmer (Ritz, Ranov) - 9:50
No scoring		Third period	Burgener (Wiedmer, Furrer) - 19:28
Janick Schwendener ( 9 saves / 11 shots ) Nicola Aeberhard ( 16 saves / 17 shots )		Goalie stats	Reto Lory ( 27 saves / 28 shots )

28 February	EHC Visp	3-2	OT	Hockey Thurgau	Lonza Arena, Visp	Recap
No scoring		First period		0:34 - Merola (K. Jones, Loosli)
Burgener (Achermann) - 22:26		Second period		No scoring
Van Guilder (Furrer, Josephs) - 56:26		Third period		9:16 - Loosli (Seiler)
Josephs - 6:04		First overtime period		No scoring
Reto Lory ( 29 saves / 29 shots )		Goalie stats		Nicola Aeberhard ( 33 saves / 36 shots )

EHC Visp won the series 4–1

== Playouts ==
Due to the interruption by the league, no team is relegated.

=== Schedule ===
February 21, 2020	HC Sierre	6-3 (0-2, 4-1, 2-0)	EVZ Academy	Patinoire de Graben, Sierre; Attendance: 1327

Game reference

Remo Giovannini
Goalies
Robin Meyer

	0-1	05:15 – Oehen (Schüpbach, Wüthrich)
	0-2	08:46 – Capaul
Castonguay (Heinimann, Meyrat) – 23:37	1-2
	1-3	27:50 – Oehen (Bougro, Brunner) (PP1)
Rimann (Asselin, Castonguay) – 31:18	2-3
Rimann (Bezina, Castonguay) (PP1) – 38:21	3-3
Massimino (Asselin, A. Montandon) – 38:51	4-3
Rimann (Heinimann, Castonguay) – 43:46	5-3
Heinimann (Rimann, Castonguay) (EN) – 58:18	6-3

6 min
Penalties
4 min
41
Shots
27

February 21, 2020	EHC Winterthur	2-6 (1-2, 0-1, 1-3)	Bellinzona Rockets	Eishalle Deutweg, Winterthur; Attendance: 793

Game reference

Justin Gianola
Goalies
Dennis Saikkonen

Wieser (Dancs, Pozzorini) (PP1) – 02:47	1-0
	1-1	03:01 – Moor (Vedova, Squires)
	1-2	05:14 – Vedova (Tosques)
	1-3	33:30 – Gerlach (Squires, Del Ponte)
Bachofner (Zahner, Schmutz) – 47:19	2-3
	2-4	48:54 – Gerlach (Squires, Vedova)
	2-5	49:29 – Fritsche
	2-6	57:38 – Gerlach (EN)

14 min
Penalties
10 min
33
Shots
33

February 23, 2020	Bellinzona Rockets	0-2 (0-1, 0-0, 0-1)	HC Sierre	Pista Ghiaccio Biasca, Biasca; Attendance: 154

Game reference
Dennis Saikkonen	Goalies	Remo Giovannini
0-1 / 18:01 – Guebey (M. Montandon, A. Montandon); 0-2 / 49:36 – A. Montandon (Massimino, Guebey) (PP1)
16 min	Penalties	6 min
36	Shots	25

February 23, 2020	EVZ Academy	1-2 (0-1, 1-1, 0-0)	EHC Winterthur	Bossard Arena, Zug; Attendance: 211

Game reference

Robin Meyer
Goalies
Tim Guggisberg

	0-1	14:28 – Monnet (Bozon, Allevi)
Schüpbach (Bougro) – 23:17	1-1
	1-2	39:48 – Pozzorini (Torquato, Guerra) (SH1)

2 min
Penalties
20 min
33
Shots
23

February 28, 2020	EVZ Academy	6-3 (4-0, 1-1, 1-2)	Bellinzona Rockets	Bossard Arena, Zug; Attendance: -

Game reference

Robin Meyer
Goalies
Dennis Saikkonen

Bougro (Wyss) – 03:00	1-0
Döpfner (Langenegger) – 09:26	2-0
Stoffel (Langenegger, Bougro) (PP1) – 12:51	3-0
Eugster (Schleiss, Schüpbach) – 16:2	4-0
	4-1	25:04 – Roberts (Portmann, Gass)
Capaul (Stoffel, Oehen) – 26:44	5-1
	5-2	48:59 – Roberts (Portmann)
Capaul (Bougro, Wyss) (PP1) – 58:24	6-2
	6-3	58:37 – Camichel (Gerlach, Squires)

4 min
Penalties
4 min
30
Shots
33

February 28, 2020	HC Sierre	5-1 (0-0, 3-0, 2-1)	EHC Winterthur	Patinoire de Graben, Sierre; Attendance: -

Game reference

Remo Giovannini
Goalies
Tim Guggisberg

Heinimann (Castonguay, Rimann) – 26:50	1-0
Massimino (A. Montandon, Asselin) (PP1) – 32:52	2-0
Castonguay (Rimann, Heinimann) – 38:48	3-0
	3-1	48:35 – Schmutz (Dancs, Alihodzic)
Asselin (A. Montandon) – 50:13	4-1
Rimann (Castonguay, M. Montandon) – 51:07	5-1

16 min
Penalties
18 min
25
Shots
31

March 1, 2020	EHC Winterthur	6-3 (1-1, 3-2, 2-0)	HC Sierre	Eishalle Deutweg, Winterthur; Attendance: -

Game reference

Tim Guggisberg
Goalies
Remo Giovannini

	0-1	11:09 – Bezina (Vouillamoz, Kyparissis)
Bozon (Roos) (SH1) – 14:13	1-1
Küng (Monnet) – 21:05	2-1
	2-2	25:36 – M. Montandon (A. Montandon) (PP1)
	2-3	28:37 – Rimann (Heinimann)
Torquato – 36:40	3-3
Dancs (Homberger, Allevi) – 39:24	4-3
Wieser (Torquato) – 42:30	5-3
Dancs (Torquato, Wieser) (PP1) – 55:25	6-3

24 min
Penalties
6 min
36
Shots
26

March 1, 2020	Bellinzona Rockets	7-6 (1-1, 4-1, 1-4, 1-0)	EVZ Academy	Pista Ghiaccio Biasca, Biasca; Attendance: -

Game reference

Dennis Saikkonen
Goalies
Robin Meyer

Portmann (Buchli, Pagnamenta) – 09:49	1-0
	1-1	19:13 – Langenegger (Döpfner, Schleiss)
	1-2	20:26 – Graf (Döpfner, Bougro)
Portmann (Squires, Gerlach) (PP1) – 23:53	2-2
Neuenschwander (Roberts, Portmann) – 24:17	3-2
Camichel (Gerlach, Squires) – 33:18	4-2
Squires (Gerlach, Camichel) – 35:35	5-2
	5-3	41:08 – Langenegger (Döpfner, Bougro)
	5-4	42:44 – Capaul
	5-5	44:44 – Wyss (Capaul) (PP1)
	5-6	49:57 – Capaul (Bougro, Schleiss) (PP1)
Fritsche (SH1) – 55:28	6-6
Fritsche (Gerlach, Moor) – 60:31	7-6

42 min
Penalties
14 min
38
Shots
30

=== Ranking ===
The regular season started on 13 September 2019 and ended on 15 February 2020.

Pos	Team	Pld	W	OTW	OTL	L	GF	GA	GD	Pts	Qualification
1	HC Sierre	48	15	4	1	28	125	168	−43	54	Officially saved from relegation
2	EVZ Academy	48	13	1	6	28	119	188	−69	47	Officially saved from relegation
3	EHC Winterthur	48	12	0	1	35	112	222	−110	37	Potentially saved from relegation
4	Bellinzona Rockets	48	7	2	7	32	116	208	−92	32	Potentially relegated

Source: Swiss League
Rules for classification: 1) points; 2) a highest number of points obtained during direct confrontations; 3) goal difference; 4) number of goals scored; 5) goal difference during direct confrontations; 6) number of goals scored during direct confrontations; 7) number of goals scored in away games; 8) number of goals scored in away games during direct confrontations.
