= Switzerland at the 2010 Winter Olympics =

- IOC code: SUI
- NOC: Swiss Olympic Association
- Website: www.swissolympic.ch (in German and French)

in Vancouver
- Competitors: 146 in 14 sports
- Flag bearer: Stéphane Lambiel
- Medals Ranked 6th: Gold 6 Silver 0 Bronze 3 Total 9

Winter Olympics appearances (overview)
- 1924; 1928; 1932; 1936; 1948; 1952; 1956; 1960; 1964; 1968; 1972; 1976; 1980; 1984; 1988; 1992; 1994; 1998; 2002; 2006; 2010; 2014; 2018; 2022; 2026

Switzerland participated at the 2010 Winter Olympics in Vancouver, British Columbia, Canada. 146 athletes entered 14 sports (all except short track speed skating).

== Medalists ==
Medal	Name	Sport	Event	Date
Gold	Simon Ammann	Ski jumping	Normal hill individual	13 February
Gold	Didier Défago	Alpine skiing	Men's downhill	15 February
Gold	Dario Cologna	Cross-country skiing	Men's 15 km freestyle	15 February
Gold	Simon Ammann	Ski jumping	Large hill individual	20 February
Gold	Carlo Janka	Alpine skiing	Men's giant slalom	21 February
Gold	Michael Schmid	Freestyle skiing	Men's ski cross	21 February
Bronze	Olivia Nobs	Snowboarding	Women's snowboard cross	16 February
Bronze	Silvan Zurbriggen	Alpine skiing	Men's combined	21 February
Bronze	Ralph Stöckli; Jan Hauser; Markus Eggler; Simon Strübin; Toni Müller	Curling	Men's	27 February

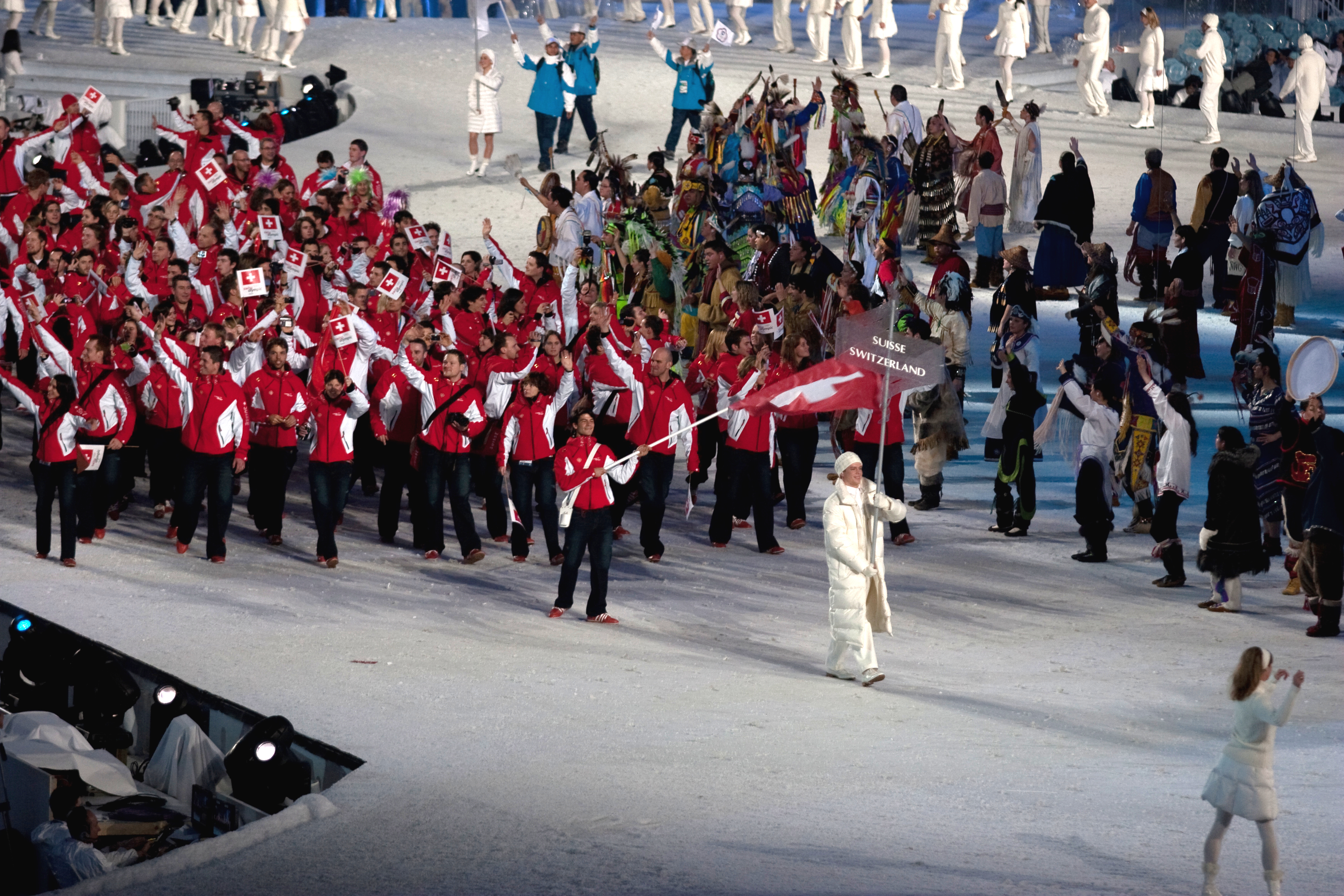
The athletes entering the stadium during the opening ceremonies.

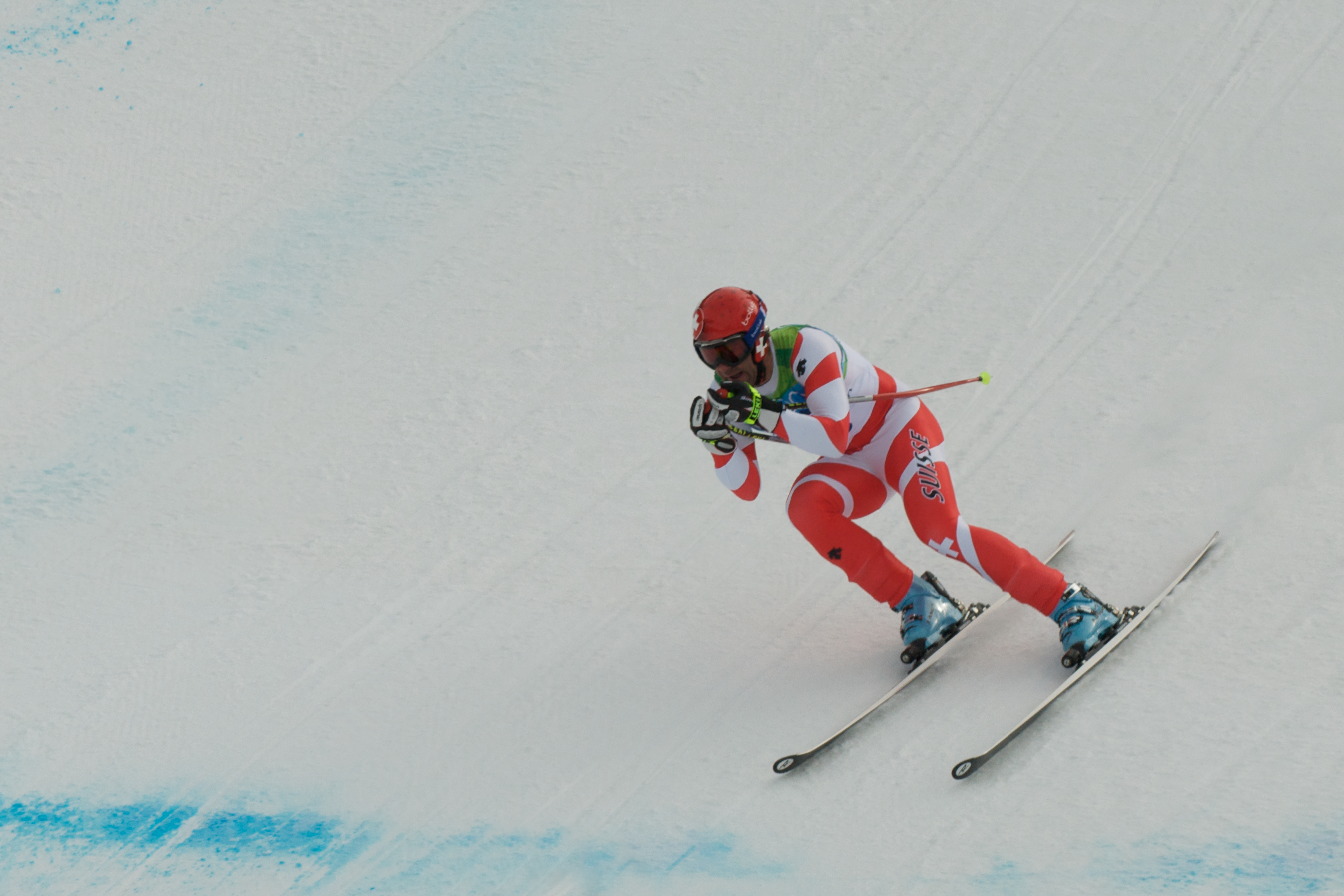
Didier Défago on his winning run in the men's downhill.

== Alpine skiing ==
Men

Athlete	Event	Run 1	Run 2	Total	Rank
Marc Berthod	Giant slalom	1:19.00	1:23.10	2:42.10	29
Didier Cuche	Downhill	1:54.67			6
Didier Cuche	Super-G	1:31.06			10
Didier Cuche	Giant slalom	1:18.75	1:20.70	2:39.45	14
Didier Défago	Downhill	1:54.31			1st place, gold medalist(s)
Didier Défago	Super-G	1:31.43			15
Didier Défago	Combined	Downhill; 1:53.69	DNF		
Tobias Grünenfelder	Super-G	1:30.90			9
Ambrosi Hoffman	Downhill	1:56.04			23
Carlo Janka	Downhill	1:55.02			11
Carlo Janka	Super-G	1:30.83			8
Carlo Janka	Combined	Downhill; 1:53.65	Slalom; 51.89	2:45.54	4
Carlo Janka	Giant slalom	1:17.27	1:20.56	2:37.83	1st place, gold medalist(s)
Sandro Viletta	Combined	Downhill; 1:55.72	Slalom; 52.47	2:48.19	14
Sandro Viletta	Giant slalom	1:18.37	1:21.17	2:39.54	15
Silvan Zurbriggen	Combined	Downhill; 1:53.88	Slalom; 51.44	2:45.32	3rd place, bronze medalist(s)

Women

Athlete	Event	Run 1	Run 2	Total	Rank
Andrea Dettling	Combined	Downhill; 1:26.28	Slalom; 48.16	2:14.44	23
Andrea Dettling	Super-G	1:22.03			12
Andrea Dettling	Giant slalom	DNF			
Dominique Gisin	Downhill	DNF			
Nadja Kamer	Combined	DNF			
Nadja Kamer	Downhill	1:48.14			19
Nadja Kamer	Super-G	DNF			
Fabienne Suter	Combined	Downhill; 1:25.29	Slalom; 45.56	2:10.85	6
Fabienne Suter	Downhill	1:46.17			5
Fabienne Suter	Super-G	1:22.16			13
Fabienne Suter	Giant slalom	1:15.97	1:11.55	2:27.52	4
Nadia Styger	Downhill	1:47.22			12
Nadia Styger	Super-G	1:21.25			6

Men's team

Name	Hometown	Date of birth	Height	Weight
Marc Berthod	St. Moritz, GR	24 November 1983	180 cm (5 ft 11 in)	85 kg (187 lb)
Marc Gini	Valbella, GR	8 November 1984	183 cm (6 ft 0 in)	81 kg (179 lb)
Patrick Küng	Obstalden, GL	11 January 1984		

== Biathlon ==
Athlete	Event	Time	Rank
Selina Gasparin	Women's 7.5 km sprint	22:23.4	56
Selina Gasparin	Women's 10 km pursuit	35:53.5	48
Selina Gasparin	Women's 15 km individual	45:23.6	40
Claudio Böckli			
Thomas Frei	Men's 10 km sprint	25:36.9	13
Thomas Frei	Men's 12.5 km pursuit	34:56.4	12
Thomas Frei	Men's 20 km individual	51:03.4	16
Thomas Frei	15 km mass start	37:12.9	24
Simon Hallenbarter	Men's 10 km sprint	25:48.3	16
Simon Hallenbarter	Men's 12.5 km pursuit	37:07.9	43
Simon Hallenbarter	20 km individual	53:18.4	43
Matthias Simmen	Men's 10 km sprint	26:11.5	26
Matthias Simmen	Men's 12.5 km pursuit	35:55.0	28
Matthias Simmen	20 km individual	53:05.7	39
Benjamin Weger	Men's 10 km sprint	27:43.6	69
Benjamin Weger	20 km individual	54:20.3	55
Thomas Frei; Matthias Simmen; Benjamin Weger; Simon Hallenbarter	Men's relay	1:24:36.8; 0+9	8

== Bobsleigh ==
Switzerland qualified three sleighs in the two-man event, two sleighs in the two-woman event and two sleighs in the four-man event. Switzerland lost two of its two-man sleighs after driver Beat Hefti and brakeman Jörg Egger suffered injuries during the training runs.

Two-man

Sled	Athletes (driver listed first)	Heat 1		Heat 2		Heat 3		Heat 4		Total	
Sled	Athletes (driver listed first)	Time	Rank	Time	Rank	Time	Rank	Time	Rank	Time	Rank
SUI I	Ivo Rüegg; Cédric Grand	4.86; 51.76	3	4.86; 52.18	6	4.86; 51.92	5	4.85; 51.99	6	3:27.85	4
SUI II	Beat Hefti; Thomas Lamparter	WD									
SUI III	Daniel Schmid; Jörg Egger	WD									

Two-woman

Sled	Athletes (driver listed first)	Heat 1		Heat 2		Heat 3		Heat 4		Total	
Sled	Athletes (driver listed first)	Time	Rank	Time	Rank	Time	Rank	Time	Rank	Time	Rank
SUI I	Sabrina Hafner; Caroline Spahni	5.32; 54.18	13	5.31; 54.70	17	5.30; 53.87	13	5.32; 54.09	12	3:36.84	12
SUI II	Fabienne Meyer; Hannelore Schenk	5.29; 54.04	11	5.29; 54.27	13	5.32; 54.00	12	5.31; 53.82	9	3:36.13	10

Four-man

Sled	Athletes (driver first, brakeman last)	Heat 1		Heat 2		Heat 3		Heat 4		Total	
Sled	Athletes (driver first, brakeman last)	Time	Rank	Time	Rank	Time	Rank	Time	Rank	Time	Rank
SUI I	Ivo Rüegg; Beat Hefti; Thomas Lamparter; Cédric Grand	4.76; 51.31	8	4.71; 51.13	4	4.77; 51.70	8	4.77; 51.57	5	3:25.71	6
SUI II	Daniel Schmid; Alex Baumann; Christian Aebli; Roman Handschin	WD									

== Cross-country skiing ==
Men

Athletes	Event	Qualification		Quarterfinals		Semifinals		Finals	
Athletes	Event	Time	Rank	Time	Rank	Time	Rank	Time	Rank
Dario Cologna	15 km freestyle							33:63.3	1st place, gold medalist(s)
Dario Cologna	30 km pursuit							1:16:12.2	13
Christoph Eigenmann	Sprint	3:42.18	34	did not advance					
Remo Fischer	15 km freestyle							34:51.1	15
Remo Fischer	30 km pursuit							1:22:52.1	44
Valerio Leccardi	Sprint	3:42.84	38	did not advance					
Toni Livers	15 km freestyle							34:43.3	12
Toni Livers	30 km pursuit							1:17:26.0	22
Curdin Perl	15 km freestyle							34:51.8	17
Curdin Perl	30 km pursuit							1:17:05.0	20
Eligius Tambornino	Sprint	3:48.33	49	did not advance					
Peter von Allmen	Sprint	3:46.16	43	did not advance					
Dario Cologna, Eligius Tambornino	Team sprint					18:54.6	6	did not advance	

Women

Athletes	Event	Qualification		Quarterfinals		Semifinals		Finals	
Athletes	Event	Time	Rank	Time	Rank	Time	Rank	Time	Rank
Laurence Rochat									
Doris Trachsel	Sprint	3:50.85	30 Q	3:44.7	6	did not advance			
Silvana Bucher, Bettina Gruber	Team sprint					20:04.6	9	did not advance	

== Curling ==
=== Men's tournament ===
Men's team

CC St Galler Bär, St Gallen.

	Name	Hometown	Date of birth
Fourth	Ralph Stöckli	Ittigen, BE	23 July 1976
Third	Jan Hauser	Zürich, ZH	19 January 1985
Skip	Markus Eggler*	Münchenstein, BL	22 January 1969
Lead	Simon Strübin	Erlenbach, ZH	21 March 1979
Alternate	Toni Müller		10 May 1984

*Throws second rocks

Standings

Final round robin standings
Team	Skip	Pld	W	L	PF	PA	EW	EL	BE	SE	S%	Qualification
Canada	Kevin Martin	9	9	0	75	36	36	28	14	2	85%	Playoffs
Norway	Thomas Ulsrud	9	7	2	64	43	40	32	15	7	84%	Playoffs
Switzerland	Ralph Stöckli	9	6	3	53	44	35	33	20	8	81%	Playoffs
Sweden	Niklas Edin	9	5	4	50	52	34	36	20	6	82%	Tiebreaker
Great Britain	David Murdoch	9	5	4	57	44	35	29	20	9	81%	Tiebreaker
Germany	Andy Kapp	9	4	5	48	60	35	38	11	9	75%	
France	Thomas Dufour	9	3	6	37	63	22	34	16	7	73%	
China	Wang Fengchun	9	2	7	52	60	37	37	9	7	77%	
Denmark	Ulrik Schmidt	9	2	7	45	63	31	29	12	6	78%	
United States	John Shuster	9	2	7	43	59	32	41	18	9	76%	

Round-robin

Draw 1

Sheet D	1	2	3	4	5	6	7	8	9	10	Final
Switzerland (Stöckli) 🔨	0	0	0	1	1	0	4	0	0	0	6
Denmark (Schmidt)	0	0	0	0	0	1	0	2	1	1	5

Draw 3

Sheet B	1	2	3	4	5	6	7	8	9	10	11	Final
United States (Shuster)	0	0	0	2	1	1	1	1	0	0	0	6
Switzerland (Stöckli) 🔨	2	1	1	0	0	0	0	0	1	1	1	7

Draw 4

Sheet D	1	2	3	4	5	6	7	8	9	10	Final
Great Britain (Murdoch)	1	0	0	2	0	0	0	0	0	0	3
Switzerland (Stöckli) 🔨	0	0	2	0	0	0	0	1	0	1	4

Draw 5

Sheet C	1	2	3	4	5	6	7	8	9	10	Final
Norway (Ulsrud) 🔨	2	0	0	1	0	1	0	1	0	2	7
Switzerland (Stöckli)	0	0	1	0	1	0	1	0	1	0	4

Draw 6

Sheet A	1	2	3	4	5	6	7	8	9	10	Final
Germany (Kapp)	0	0	1	0	1	1	1	0	3	0	7
Switzerland (Stöckli) 🔨	2	0	0	2	0	0	0	1	0	1	6

Draw 8

Sheet B	1	2	3	4	5	6	7	8	9	10	Final
Switzerland (Stöckli)	0	0	2	0	3	0	2	0	2	x	9
China (Wang) 🔨	0	1	0	2	0	1	0	1	0	x	5

Draw 9

Sheet C	1	2	3	4	5	6	7	8	9	10	Final
Switzerland (Stöckli)	0	1	0	0	0	1	0	2	0	0	4
Canada (Martin) 🔨	2	0	1	0	0	0	2	0	0	1	6

Draw 10

Sheet D	1	2	3	4	5	6	7	8	9	10	Final
Switzerland (Stöckli)	1	1	0	2	0	0	0	0	3	x	7
Sweden (Edin) 🔨	0	0	2	0	0	0	1	0	0	x	3

Draw 12

Sheet D	1	2	3	4	5	6	7	8	9	10	Final
Switzerland (Stöckli) 🔨	2	0	0	0	0	2	1	1	0	x	6
France (Dufour)	0	0	0	1	0	0	0	0	1	x	2

Semifinal

Sheet D	1	2	3	4	5	6	7	8	9	10	Final
Switzerland (Stöckli)	0	0	0	1	0	2	0	1	0	1	5
Norway (Ulsrud) 🔨	0	1	1	0	2	0	1	0	2	0	7

Bronze medal game

Team	1	2	3	4	5	6	7	8	9	10	Final
Sweden (Edin)	0	1	0	0	2	0	1	0	0	0	4
Switzerland (Stöckli) 🔨	1	0	0	1	0	1	0	0	0	2	5

=== Women's tournament ===
Women's team

Davos CC, Davos.

	Name	Hometown	Date of birth
Skip	Mirjam Ott	Zürich, ZH	27 January 1972
Third	Carmen Schäfer	Fahrweid, ZH	8 January 1981
Second	Carmen Küng	Feldbrunnen, SO	30 January 1978
Lead	Janine Greiner	Fahrweid, ZH	13 February 1981
Alternate	Irene Schori		4 December 1983

Standings

Final round robin standings
Team	Skip	Pld	W	L	PF	PA	EW	EL	BE	SE	S%	Qualification
Canada	Cheryl Bernard	9	8	1	56	37	40	29	20	13	81%	Playoffs
Sweden	Anette Norberg	9	7	2	56	52	36	36	13	5	79%	Playoffs
China	Wang Bingyu	9	6	3	61	47	39	37	12	7	74%	Playoffs
Switzerland	Mirjam Ott	9	6	3	67	48	40	36	7	12	76%	Playoffs
Denmark	Angelina Jensen	9	4	5	49	61	31	40	15	5	74%	
Germany	Andrea Schöpp	9	3	6	52	56	35	40	15	4	75%	
Great Britain	Eve Muirhead	9	3	6	54	59	36	41	11	10	75%	
Japan	Moe Meguro	9	3	6	64	70	36	37	13	5	73%	
Russia	Liudmila Privivkova	9	3	6	53	60	36	40	14	13	77%	
United States	Debbie McCormick	9	2	7	43	65	36	36	12	12	77%	

Round-robin

Draw 1

Tuesday, February 16, 2:00 PM

Sheet D	1	2	3	4	5	6	7	8	9	10	Final
Canada (Bernard) 🔨	0	0	1	0	0	2	0	1	0	1	5
Switzerland (Ott)	0	0	0	2	0	0	1	0	1	0	4

Draw 2

Wednesday, February 17, 9:00 AM

Sheet C	1	2	3	4	5	6	7	8	9	10	11	Final
Switzerland (Ott)	0	2	0	1	0	1	0	1	0	2	0	7
Sweden (Norberg) 🔨	1	0	1	0	2	0	2	0	1	0	1	8

Draw 3

Wednesday, February 17, 7:00 PM

Sheet D	1	2	3	4	5	6	7	8	9	10	Final
China (Wang)	0	1	0	0	4	0	1	1	0	1	8
Switzerland (Ott) 🔨	2	0	0	1	0	1	0	0	2	0	6

Draw 6

Friday, February 19, 7:00 PM

Sheet D	1	2	3	4	5	6	7	8	9	10	Final
Switzerland (Ott)	4	1	0	0	1	1	0	1	0	x	8
Russia (Sidorova) 🔨	0	0	1	1	0	0	2	0	1	x	5

Draw 7

Saturday, February 20, 2:00 PM

Sheet C	1	2	3	4	5	6	7	8	9	10	Final
Denmark (Jensen) 🔨	2	1	0	2	0	0	1	1	0	0	7
Switzerland (Ott)	0	0	2	0	2	1	0	0	2	1	8

Draw 8

Sunday, February 21, 9:00 AM

Sheet A	1	2	3	4	5	6	7	8	9	10	Final
Great Britain (Muirhead)	0	1	0	0	1	0	3	1	0	x	6
Switzerland (Ott) 🔨	2	0	2	4	0	1	0	0	1	x	10

Draw 10

Monday, February 22, 2:00 PM

Sheet B	1	2	3	4	5	6	7	8	9	10	Final
Japan (Meguro) 🔨	1	0	1	0	1	0	1	0	x	x	4
Switzerland (Ott)	0	2	0	4	0	2	0	2	x	x	10

Draw 11

Tuesday, February 23, 9:00 AM

Sheet B	1	2	3	4	5	6	7	8	9	10	Final
Switzerland (Ott)	0	0	0	0	1	1	0	1	1	x	4
Germany (Schöpp) 🔨	0	0	1	0	0	0	1	0	0	x	2

Draw 12

Tuesday, February 23, 7:00 PM

Sheet A	1	2	3	4	5	6	7	8	9	10	Final
Switzerland (Ott)	0	0	2	1	3	1	3	x	x	x	10
United States (McCormick) 🔨	1	2	0	0	0	0	0	x	x	x	3

Semifinal

Thursday, February 25, 9:00 AM

Team	1	2	3	4	5	6	7	8	9	10	Final
Canada (Bernard) 🔨	1	0	2	0	0	2	0	0	1	0	6
Switzerland (Ott)	0	1	0	1	1	0	0	1	0	1	5

Bronze medal game

Friday, February 26, 9:00 AM

Team	1	2	3	4	5	6	7	8	9	10	Final
China (Wang) 🔨	3	0	2	0	1	0	2	4	x	x	12
Switzerland (Ott)	0	1	0	3	0	2	0	0	x	x	6

== Figure skating ==
Athlete(s)	Event	SP		FS		Total	
Athlete(s)	Event	Points	Rank	Points	Rank	Points	Rank
Stéphane Lambiel	Men	84.63	5	162.09	3	246.72	4
Sarah Meier	Ladies	56.70	15	96.11	14	152.81	15
Anaïs Morand, Antoine Dorsaz	Pairs	55.34	13	89.08	17	144.42	15

== Freestyle skiing ==
Switzerland entered 14 athletes into freestyle skiing events, 6 in the aerials and 8 in ski cross.

=== Aerials ===
Athletes	Event	Qualifying						Final					
Athletes	Event	Jump 1	Rank	Jump 2	Rank	Total	Rank	Jump 1	Rank	Jump 2	Rank	Total	Rank
Evelyne Leu	Women's	93.75	5	61.75	19	155.50	16	did not advance					
Tanja Schärer	Women's	60.63	20	65.10	18	125.73	19	did not advance					
Christian Hächler	Men's	106.64	15	100.61	20	207.25	16	did not advance					
Andreas Isoz	Men's	103.76	17	110.42	13	214.18	14	did not advance					
Thomas Lambert	Men's	114.58	11	123.75	1	238.33	3 Q	93.66	11	117.24	10	210.90	12
Renato Ulrich	Men's	81.86	23	118.55	5	200.41	18	did not advance					

=== Ski cross ===
Athletes	Event	Qualifying		1/8 finals	Quarterfinals	Semifinals	Finals	
Athletes	Event	Time	Rank	Position	Position	Position	Position	Rank
Sanna Lüdi	Women's	1:32.87	35					35
Katrin Müller	Women's	1:18.92	9 Q	4 DNF				18
Emilie Serain	Women's	WD						
Fanny Smith	Women's	1:17.38	3 Q	1 Q	2 Q	3		7
Franziska Steffen	Women's	1:22.32	29 Q	4 DNF				29
Beni Hofer	Men's	1:16.18	31 Q	4				32
Conradign Netzer	Men's	1:13.91	14 Q	3				20
Michael Schmid	Men's	1:12.53	1 Q	1 Q	1 Q	1 Q	1 Q	Gold medal
Richard Spalinger	Men's	1:15.12	27 Q	2 Q	4			14

== Ice hockey ==
=== Men's tournament ===
Roster

The following is the Swiss roster in the men's ice hockey tournament of the 2010 Winter Olympics.

No.	Pos.	Name	Height	Weight	Birthdate	Birthplace	2009–10 team
66	G	Ronnie Rüeger	186 cm (6 ft 1 in)	89 kg (196 lb)	26 February 1973	Bülach	(Switzerland) Kloten Flyers (NLA)
1	G	Jonas Hiller	188 cm (6 ft 2 in)	86 kg (190 lb)	12 February 1982	Felben-Wellhausen	(United States) Anaheim Ducks (NHL)
52	G	Tobias Stephan	188 cm (6 ft 2 in)	82 kg (181 lb)	21 January 1984	Zürich	(Switzerland) Genève-Servette (NLA)
5	D	Severin Blindenbacher	180 cm (5 ft 11 in)	88 kg (194 lb)	15 March 1983	Zürich	(Sweden) Färjestad (SEL)
16	D	Raphael Diaz	182 cm (6 ft 0 in)	88 kg (194 lb)	9 January 1986	Baar	(Switzerland) Zug (NLA)
54	D	Philippe Furrer	186 cm (6 ft 1 in)	90 kg (200 lb)	16 June 1985	Bern	(Switzerland) Bern (NLA)
72	D	Patrick von Gunten	180 cm (5 ft 11 in)	83 kg (183 lb)	10 February 1985	Biel	(Switzerland) Kloten Flyers (NLA)
47	D	Luca Sbisa	185 cm (6 ft 1 in)	80 kg (180 lb)	30 January 1990	Ozieri, Italy	(United States) Portland Winterhawks (WHL)
31	D	Mathias Seger – A	181 cm (5 ft 11 in)	84 kg (185 lb)	17 December 1977	Flawil	(Switzerland) ZSC Lions (NLA)
7	D	Mark Streit – C	183 cm (6 ft 0 in)	95 kg (209 lb)	11 December 1977	Englisberg	(United States) New York Islanders (NHL)
77	D	Yannick Weber	178 cm (5 ft 10 in)	88 kg (194 lb)	23 September 1988	Morges	(Canada) Hamilton Bulldogs (AHL)
10	F	Andres Ambühl	176 cm (5 ft 9 in)	85 kg (187 lb)	14 September 1983	Davos	(United States) Hartford Wolf Pack (AHL)
18	F	Thomas Déruns	186 cm (6 ft 1 in)	86 kg (190 lb)	1 March 1982	La Chaux-de-Fonds	(Switzerland) Genève-Servette (NLA)
17	F	Hnat Domenichelli	183 cm (6 ft 0 in)	82 kg (181 lb)	16 February 1976	Edmonton, Alberta, Canada	(Switzerland) Lugano (NLA)
35	F	Sandy Jeannin – A	180 cm (5 ft 11 in)	83 kg (183 lb)	28 February 1976	Les Bayards	(Switzerland) Fribourg-Gottéron (NLA)
67	F	Romano Lemm	182 cm (6 ft 0 in)	86 kg (190 lb)	25 June 1984	Dielsdorf	(Switzerland) Lugano (NLA)
25	F	Thibaut Monnet	183 cm (6 ft 0 in)	83 kg (183 lb)	2 February 1982	Martigny	(Switzerland) ZSC Lions (NLA)
23	F	Thierry Paterlini	184 cm (6 ft 0 in)	96 kg (212 lb)	27 April 1975	Chur	(Switzerland) Rapperswil-Jona Lakers (NLA)
28	F	Martin Plüss	174 cm (5 ft 9 in)	80 kg (180 lb)	5 April 1977	Murgenthal	(Switzerland) Bern (NLA)
32	F	Ivo Rüthemann	172 cm (5 ft 8 in)	76 kg (168 lb)	12 December 1976	Mosnang	(Switzerland) Bern (NLA)
39	F	Raffaele Sannitz	187 cm (6 ft 2 in)	93 kg (205 lb)	18 May 1983	Lugano	(Switzerland) Lugano (NLA)
86	F	Julien Sprunger	194 cm (6 ft 4 in)	87 kg (192 lb)	4 January 1986	Grolley	(Switzerland) Fribourg-Gottéron (NLA)
14	F	Roman Wick	187 cm (6 ft 2 in)	85 kg (187 lb)	30 December 1985	Zuzwil	(Switzerland) Kloten Flyers (NLA)

Goaltender Martin Gerber, defencemen Goran Bezina and Roman Josi, and forward Kevin Romy were initially selected, but could not play due to injury. They were replaced by Ronnie Rüeger, Philippe Furrer, Patrick von Gunten and Romano Lemm, respectively.

==== Group play ====
Switzerland played in Group A.

Round-robin

All times are local (UTC-8).

16 February 2010; 12:00	United States	3–1 (1–0, 2–0, 0–1)	Switzerland	Canada Hockey Place, Vancouver; Attendance: 16,706

Game reference

Ryan Miller
Goalies
Jonas Hiller
Referees:
(Russia) Vyacheslav Bulanov
(Canada) Dan O'Halloran
Linesmen:
(Canada) Jean Morin
(Russia) Yuri Oskirko

B. Ryan – 18:59	1–0
D. Backes – 25:52	2–0
R. Malone (R. Suter) (PP) – 28:25	3–0
	3–1	49:45 – R. Wick (H. Domenichelli, M. Streit) (PP)

4 min
Penalties
6 min
24
Shots
15

18 February 2010; 16:30	Switzerland	2–3 (SO) (0–1, 2–1, 0–0, 0–0, 0–1)	Canada	Canada Hockey Place, Vancouver; Attendance: 17,019

Game reference

Jonas Hiller
Goalies
Martin Brodeur
Referees:
(United States) Dennis LaRue
(Sweden) Marcus Vinnerborg
Linesmen:
(United States) Peter Feola
(United States) Tim Nowak

	0–1	9:21 – D. Heatley (P. Marleau, J. Toews)
	0–2	20:35 – P. Marleau (D. Heatley, S. Weber) (PP)
I. Rüthemann (M. Plüss, T. Paterlini) – 28:59	1–2
P. von Gunten (T. Monnet, P. Furrer) – 39:50	2–2

H. Domenichelli (miss)
R. Lemm (miss)
R. Wick (miss)
M. Plüss (miss)
Shootout
(miss) S. Crosby
(miss) J. Toews
(miss) R. Getzlaf
S. Crosby
14 min
Penalties
2 min
23
Shots
47

20 February 2010; 12:00	Norway	4–5 (OT) (1–1, 2–2, 1–1, 0–1)	Switzerland	Canada Hockey Place, Vancouver; Attendance: 16,952

Game reference

Pål Grotnes
Goalies
Jonas Hiller
Referees:
(Canada) Paul Devorski
(Slovakia) Peter Ország
Linesmen:
(Slovakia) Milan Novak
(Germany) Felix Winnekens

	0–1	1:03 – J. Sprunger (H. Domenichelli, R. Sannitz)
T. Vikingstad (P. Thoresen, T. Jakobsen) – 12:21	1–1
M. Hansen (P. Thoresen) (PP) – 25:24	2–1
	2–2	29:15 – R. Wick (M. Seger, M. Plüss)
	2–3	35:42 – R. Sannitz (M. Seger, R. Wick)
T. Vikingstad (M. Zuccarello, M. Olimb) – 38:46	3–3
	3–4	49:56 – S. Blindenbacher (R. Wick, M. Streit) (PP)
T. Vikingstad (P. Thoresen) – 52:18	4–4
	4–5	62:28 – R. Lemm (S. Jeannin)

4 min
Penalties
10 min
23
Shots
38

Standings

Team	Pld	W	OTW	OTL	L	GF	GA	GD	Pts	Qualification
United States	3	3	0	0	0	14	5	+9	9	Quarterfinals
Canada	3	1	1	0	1	14	7	+7	5	
Switzerland	3	0	1	1	1	8	10	−2	3	
Norway	3	0	0	1	2	5	19	−14	1	

Source: IIHF

==== Final rounds ====
Qualification playoff

23 February 2010; 12:00	Switzerland	3–2 (SO) (1–1, 1–1, 0–0, 0–0, 1–0)	Belarus	Canada Hockey Place, Vancouver; Attendance: 17,397

Game reference

Jonas Hiller
Goalies
Andrei Mezin
Referees:
(Canada) Paul Devorski
(Slovakia) Peter Ország
Linesmen:
(Czech Republic) Petr Blümel
(United States) Tim Nowak

	0–1	0:59 – A. Kalyuzhny (V. Kostyuchenok)
J. Sprunger (R. Wick, M. Plüss) (PP) – 12:25	1–1
H. Domenichelli (M. Streit, S. Blindenbacher) (PP) – 27:07	2–1
	2–2	35:42 – K. Zakharov (A. Ugarov, N. Stasenko) (PP)

T. Déruns
R. Lemm
I. Rüthemann (miss)
Shootout
(miss) O. Antonenko
D. Meleshko
(miss) S. Kostitsyn
10 min
Penalties
6 min
42
Shots
22

Quarterfinal

24 February 2010; 12:00	United States	2–0 (0–0, 0–0, 2–0)	Switzerland	Canada Hockey Place, Vancouver; Attendance: 17,536

Game reference
Ryan Miller	Goalies	Jonas Hiller	Referees: (Canada) Paul Devorski (Slovakia) Peter Ország; Linesmen: (United States) Shane Heyer (Germany) Felix Winnekens
Z. Parise (B. Rafalski, P. Stastny) (PP) – 42:08 / 1–0; Z. Parise (EN) – 59:48 / 2–0			Referees: (Canada) Paul Devorski (Slovakia) Peter Ország; Linesmen: (United States) Shane Heyer (Germany) Felix Winnekens
6 min	Penalties	8 min	Referees: (Canada) Paul Devorski (Slovakia) Peter Ország; Linesmen: (United States) Shane Heyer (Germany) Felix Winnekens
44	Shots	19	Referees: (Canada) Paul Devorski (Slovakia) Peter Ország; Linesmen: (United States) Shane Heyer (Germany) Felix Winnekens

=== Women's tournament ===
Roster

The following is the Swiss roster in the women's ice hockey tournament of the 2010 Winter Olympics.

Position	Name	Height (cm)	Weight (kg)	Birthdate	Birthplace	2009–10 team
G	Sophie Anthamatten	172	74	26 July 1991	Visp	EHC Saastal
G	Florence Schelling	174	68	9 March 1989	Zürich	Northeastern Huskies
G	Dominique Slongo	160	53	13 October 1988	Bern	EHC Brandis
D	Laura Benz	170	57	25 August 1992	Zürich	EHC Winterthur
D	Angela Frautschi	169	73	5 June 1987	Interlaken	ZSC Lions
D	Julia Marty – A	170	72	16 April 1988	Nussbaumen	Northeastern Huskies
D	Lucrèce Nussbaum	173	67	7 October 1986	Scherzingen	St. Thomas Tommies
D	Claudia Riechsteiner	168	65	3 January 1986	Sursee	SC Reinach
D	Sandra Thalmann	162	66	18 December 1992	Basel	EHC Basel
D	Stefanie Wyss	164	62	19 October 1985	Bern	EV Bomo Thun
F	Sara Benz	163	54	25 August 1992	Zürich	EHC Winterthur
F	Nicole Bullo	160	54	18 July 1987	Bellinzona	HC Lugano
F	Melanie Häfliger	160	52	29 September 1982	Schenkon	SC Reinach
F	Kathrin Lehmann – C	172	70	27 February 1980	Zürich	AIK
F	Darcia Leimgruber	162	62	19 May 1989	Basel	Maine Black Bears
F	Stefanie Marty	168	70	16 April 1988	Nussbaumen	Syracuse Orange
F	Christine Meier – A	169	68	24 May 1986	Bülach	ZSC Lions
F	Rahel Michielin	165	52	11 October 1990	Frauenfeld	ZSC Lions
F	Katrin Nabholz	167	57	3 April 1986	Basel	ZSC Lions
F	Anja Stiefel	160	56	9 August 1990	Frauenfeld	SC Reinach
F	Sabrina Zollinger	162	65	27 March 1993	Zürich	EHC Winterthur

==== Group play ====
Switzerland played in Group A.

Round-robin

All times are local (UTC-8).

13 February 2010; 12:00	Sweden	3–0 (1–0, 1–0, 1–0)	Switzerland	UBC Winter Sports Centre, Vancouver; Attendance: 5,222

Game reference

Kim Martin
Goalies
Florence Schelling
Referee:
Leah Wrazidlo (United States)

Rundqvist (Udén Johansson, Svedin Thunström) – 12:31	1–0
Enström (Östberg, Myrén) – 31:35	2–0
Udén Johansson (Nevalainen) – 41:50	3–0

14 min
Penalties
6 min
34
Shots
16

15 February 2010; 14:30	Switzerland	1–10 (0–2, 1–3, 0–5)	Canada	UBC Winter Sports Centre, Vancouver; Attendance: 5,413

Game reference

Florence Schelling (out 51:55)
Dominique Slongo (in 51:55)
Goalies
Shannon Szabados
Referee:
Nicole Hertrich (Germany)

	0–1	6:27 – Apps (Kingsbury, Piper) (PP)
	0–2	14:25 – Vaillancourt (Johnston)
	0–3	22:19 – Piper (Wickenheiser)
	0–4	28:08 – Agosta (Ward, Ouellette)
	0–5	31:15 – Agosta (Ouellette, Hefford)
Leimgruber (Lehmann, S. Marty) – 39:46	1–5
	1–6	40:54 – Hefford (Wickenheiser) (SH)
	1–7	49:08 – Ward
	1–8	49:27 – Poulin
	1–9	50:43 – Johnston (Vaillancourt, Kellar)
	1–10	51:55 – Wickenheiser (Piper, Apps)

8 min
Penalties
10 min
12
Shots
62

17 February 2010; 19:00	Slovakia	2–5 (1–0, 0–1, 1–4)	Switzerland	UBC Winter Sports Centre, Vancouver; Attendance: 5,272

Game reference

Zuzana Tomčíková
Goalies
Florence Schelling
Referee:
Ulla Sipilä (Finland)

Čulíková (Čupková) – 7:10	1–0
	1–1	35:39 – S. Marty
Čulíková (Kapustová, Čupková) – 40:19	2–1
	2–2	50:35 – S. Marty (Nussbaum)
	2–3	51:18 – Benz (Meier, Schelling)
	2–4	56:28 – Lehmann (Leimgruber) (SH)
	2–5	58:25 – S. Marty (Hafliger, Benz)

12 min
Penalties
12 min
33
Shots
45

Standings

Team	Pld	W	OTW	OTL	L	GF	GA	GD	Pts	Qualification
Canada	3	3	0	0	0	41	2	+39	9	Semifinals
Sweden	3	2	0	0	1	10	15	−5	6	Semifinals
Switzerland	3	1	0	0	2	6	15	−9	3	5–8th classification
Slovakia	3	0	0	0	3	4	29	−25	0	5–8th classification

Source: ESPN

==== Final rounds ====
Fifth place semifinal

20 February 2010; 14:30	Switzerland	6–0 (2–0, 2–0, 2–0)	China	UBC Winter Sports Centre, Vancouver; Attendance: 5,454

Game reference

Florence Schelling
Goalies
Shi Yao (out 7:53)
Jia Dandan (in 7:53)
Referee:
Leah Wrazidlo (United States)

Lehmann (S. Marty) – 7:02	1–0
S. Marty – 7:53	2–0
Nussbaum (J. Marty, Lehmann) (PP) – 37:12	3–0
S. Marty (Lehmann, Leimgruber) – 39:44	4–0
S. Marty (Lehmann, Meier) – 54:54	5–0
S. Marty (Leimgruber, Benz) – 58:48	6–0

16 min
Penalties
6 min
49
Shots
21

Fifth place game

22 February 2010; 19:00	Switzerland	2–1 GWS (0–1, 1–0, 0–0) (OT: 0–0) (SO: 1–0)	Russia	UBC Winter Sports Centre, Vancouver; Attendance: 5,412

Game reference
Florence Schelling	Goalies	Irina Gashennikova	Referee: Ulla Sipilä (Finland); Linesmen: Zuzana Arazimová (Czech Republic); Kerry Rumble (Canada)
/ 0–1 / 9:05 – Burina (Sergina, Permyakova) (PP); S. Marty (Nussbaum, Meier) (PP) – 34:12 / 1–1			Referee: Ulla Sipilä (Finland); Linesmen: Zuzana Arazimová (Czech Republic); Kerry Rumble (Canada)
Lehmann (miss); Bullo; S. Marty	Shootout	Sosina; (miss) Gavrilova; (miss) Deulina	Referee: Ulla Sipilä (Finland); Linesmen: Zuzana Arazimová (Czech Republic); Kerry Rumble (Canada)
10 min	Penalties	16 min	Referee: Ulla Sipilä (Finland); Linesmen: Zuzana Arazimová (Czech Republic); Kerry Rumble (Canada)
27	Shots	33	Referee: Ulla Sipilä (Finland); Linesmen: Zuzana Arazimová (Czech Republic); Kerry Rumble (Canada)

== Luge ==
Athlete	Event	Run 1	Run 2	Run 3	Run 4	Total	Rank
Martina Kocher	Women's singles	42.005	41.697	41.976	41.897	2:47.575	7
Stefan Höhener	Men's singles	48.728	53.838	49.559	48.713	3:20.838	32

== Nordic combined ==
Athlete	Event	Jump distance	Jump score	Rank	Cross-country time	Total	Rank
Ronny Heer	Individual normal hill/10 km	97.0	116.5	21	25:09.2		11
Tim Hug	Individual normal hill/10 km	93.5	108.0	36	26:04.1		35
Seppi Hurschler	Individual normal hill/10 km	94.0	109.0	34	25:40.6		29
Tommy Schmid	Individual normal hill/10 km	96.5	115.0	26	27:38.5		40

Switzerland also competed in the individual large hill event and the team event.

== Skeleton ==
Women

Athlete	Run 1	Run 2	Run 3	Run 4	Total	Rank
Maya Pedersen	54.53	54.83	54.24	53.91	3:37.51	9

Men

Athlete	Run 1	Run 2	Run 3	Run 4	Total	Rank
Pascal Oswald	53.77	53.68	53.00	53.30	3:33.75	16

== Ski jumping ==
Athlete	Event	Qualifying		First round		Final		
Athlete	Event	Points	Rank	Points	Rank	Points	Total	Rank
Simon Ammann	Normal hill	0.0	PQ	135.5	1 Q	141.0	276.5	Gold medal
Simon Ammann	Large hill	0.0	PQ	144.7	1 Q	138.9	283.6	Gold medal
Andreas Küttel	Normal hill	120.5	23 Q	110.0	35	DNQ		
Andreas Küttel	Large hill	122.5	20 Q	105.2	22 Q	119.0	204.9	24

Notes: PQ indicates a skier was pre-qualified for the final, based on entry rankings. Q indicates a skier qualified for the next round. DNQ indicates a skier did not qualify for the next round.

== Snowboarding ==
=== Halfpipe ===
Athlete	Event	Qualifying run 1		Qualifying run 2		Semifinal		Final		
Athlete	Event	Points	Rank	Points	Rank	Points	Rank	Run 1	Run 2	Rank
Sergio Berger	Men's	7.3	37	26.2	20	did not advance				
Christian Haller	Men's	8.8	35	16.0	31	did not advance				
Markus Keller	Men's	13.6	26	20.4	23	did not advance				
Iouri Podladtchikov	Men's	36.3	6	41.4	5	PQ		42.4	17.6	4
Ursina Haller	Women's	28.3	13	31.9	11	35.4	6	27.9	18.1	9
Manuela Pesko	Women's	12.2	25	17.5	22	did not advance				

=== Parallel giant slalom ===
Athlete	Event	Qualification		Round of 16		Quarterfinals		Semifinals (consolation round)		Finals (consolation round)		
Athlete	Event	Time	Rank	Opponent	Time	Opponent	Time	Opponent	Time	Opponent	Time	Rank
Nevin Galmarini	Men's	1:18.86	17	DNQ								
Roland Haldi	Men's	1:19.51	20	DNQ								
Marc Iselin	Men's	1:19.16	19	DNQ								
Simon Schoch	Men's	1:16.95	3 Q	Bussler (GER)	-22.06 W	Detkov (RUS)	DSQ L	Flander (SLO)	DNS W	Kosir (SLO)	-0.92 W	5
Fränzi Mägert-Kohli	Women's	1:50.76	28	DNQ								

=== Snowboard cross ===
Athlete	Event	Qualifying		Quarterfinals	Semifinals	Finals	
Athlete	Event	Time	Rank	Position	Position	Position	Final rank
Fabio Caduff	Men's	1:22.78	16 Q	2 Q	3		13
Mellie Francon	Women's	1:24.43	1 Q	1 Q	4	3	7
Sandra Frei	Women's	1:29.46	4 Q	4			11
Simona Meiler	Women's	1:27.94	9 Q	3			9
Olivia Nobs	Women's	1:26.25	4 Q	1 Q	1 Q	3	Bronze medal

== Speed skating ==
Men

Athlete	Event	Final	
Athlete	Event	Time	Rank
Roger Schneider	5000 m	6:39.29	24

== See also ==
- Switzerland at the 2010 Winter Paralympics
