= Tuomas Tolonen =

Finnish ice hockey goaltender

- Born: September 13, 1993 (age 31); Kajaani, Finland
- Height: 5 ft 10 in (178 cm)
- Weight: 163 lb (74 kg; 11 st 9 lb)
- Position: Goalie
- Catches: Left
- Mestis team Former teams: Hokki; Iisalmen Peli-Karhut; Orlik Opole
- Playing career: 2013–present

Tuomas Tolonen (born September 13, 1993) is a Finnish professional ice hockey goaltender playing for Hokki of Mestis.

Tolonen began his career with Hokki and made his debut for the team during the 2013–14 Mestis season. On April 15, 2015, Tolonen joined Iisalmen Peli-Karhut, initially of Suomi-sarja before they were promoted to Mestis that season. After three seasons with IPK, he moved to the Polska Hokej Liga and signed with Orlik Opole on September 14, 2018, the day after his 25th birthday. He would be released from the team by November however and on January 19, 2019, Tolonen returned to IPK as a replacement for Dennis Saikkonen following his departure to EHC Biel.

On April 30, 2020, Tolonen returned to his original club Hokki.
