= Greg Squires =

American ice hockey player (born 1988)

- Born: July 6, 1988 (age 36); White Plains, New York, U.S.
- Height: 5 ft 7 in (170 cm)
- Weight: 172 lb (78 kg; 12 st 4 lb)
- Position: Winger
- Shoots: Right
- Allsv team Former teams: Södertälje SK; Örebro HK; Kunlun Red Star; Graz 99ers HC TPS
- NHL draft: Undrafted
- Playing career: 2012–present

Gregory Squires (born July 6, 1988) is an American professional ice hockey winger who is currently playing under contract with Södertälje SK of the HockeyAllsvenskan (Allsv).

== Playing career ==
After graduating from Ann Arbor Huron High School, Squires played for Western Michigan University from 2008–12.

In his first year with the Broncos, Squires played in 41 games and was named a CCHA All-Rookie Team Honorable Mention for his efforts. In February, while playing on a line with senior Patrick Galivan, Squires was the CCHA's top scoring rookie, earning him Rookie of the Month honors. He had also been named Rookie of the Month for January as well.

In his junior year, he played in all 42 games of the season and finished fourth on the team in points with 28. He helped guide the Broncos to the 2011 CCHA Men's Ice Hockey Tournament where he assisted on the overtime goal that helped send the Broncos to the Semifinals for the first time in 17 years. He also assisted in the 5–2 win over the University of Michigan in the CCHA Semifinals to help the Broncos reach the CCHA Championship Finals for the first time since 1986. The Broncos later lost to Miami in the CCHA Championship game, with Squires picking up one assist.

Following his collegiate career, Squires signed an ECHL contract with the Stockton Thunder. After playing two games, Squires joined the Starbulls Rosenheim for the 2012–13 season. After one season with Rosenheim, Squires joined the Bietigheim Steelers for the 2013–14 season. Moving on from the German league, Squires joined IK Oskarshamn of the HockeyAllsvenskan in 2014. Squires later joined the Swedish Hockey League's Örebro HK for the 2015–16 season.

Despite agreeing to a contract extension with Örebro, Squires agreed to join the Kunlun Red Star of the Kontinental Hockey League in April 2017. On October 11, 2019, Squires signed a contract with HC TPS. Squires played just 14 regular season games in the Liiga, before leaving Finland to play the remainder of the season with Swiss club, the Ticino Rockets of the Swiss League (SL), affiliate of HC Lugano of the National League (NL).

After sitting out the 2020–21 season, Squires returned to the professional circuit in re-joining former club, Kunlun Red Star of the KHL, on July 22, 2021. Squires contributed with 2 goals and 3 points through 27 regular season games with Kunlun before leaving the club and returning to continue his career in Sweden by joining Allsvenskan club, Södertälje SK, for the remainder of the 2021–22 season on 25 December 2021.

== Career statistics ==
=== Regular season and playoffs ===
			Regular season					Playoffs
Season	Team	League	GP	G	A	Pts	PIM	GP	G	A	Pts	PIM
2003–04	Brunswick School	USHS	26	18	16	34	12	—	—	—	—	—
2004–05	U.S. National Development Team	NAHL	33	7	6	13	26	9	0	2	2	2
2005–06	U.S. National Development Team	NAHL	25	7	9	16	32	12	1	5	6	20
2006–07	Indiana Ice	USHL	55	12	20	32	53	7	3	2	5	2
2007–08	Indiana Ice	USHL	58	24	46	70	50	3	0	0	0	6
2008–09	Western Michigan University	CCHA	41	7	22	29	28	—	—	—	—	—
2009–10	Western Michigan University	CCHA	36	4	20	24	26	—	—	—	—	—
2010–11	Western Michigan University	CCHA	42	7	21	28	31	—	—	—	—	—
2011–12	Western Michigan University	CCHA	41	8	11	19	24	—	—	—	—	—
2011–12	Stockton Thunder	ECHL	2	0	0	0	0	7	2	1	3	6
2012–13	Starbulls Rosenheim	2.GBun	47	22	26	46	102	13	8	11	19	8
2013–14	Bietigheim Steelers	DEL2	54	30	38	68	46	15	4	9	13	14
2014–15	IK Oskarshamn	Allsv	51	18	26	44	46	—	—	—	—	—
2015–16	Örebro HK	SHL	48	13	11	24	18	2	0	0	0	2
2016–17	Örebro HK	SHL	48	13	14	27	10	—	—	—	—	—
2017–18	Kunlun Red Star	KHL	10	0	0	0	0	—	—	—	—	—
2017–18	KRS Heilongjiang	VHL	6	1	1	2	0	—	—	—	—	—
2018–19	Kunlun Red Star	KHL	59	3	8	11	14	—	—	—	—	—
2019–20	Graz 99ers	EBEL	6	5	2	7	0	—	—	—	—	—
2019–20	HC TPS	Liiga	14	0	4	4	10	—	—	—	—	—
2019–20	HCB Ticino Rockets	SL	11	4	6	10	6	—	—	—	—	—
2021–22	Kunlun Red Star	KHL	27	2	1	3	8	—	—	—	—	—
SHL totals			96	26	25	51	28	2	0	0	0	0
KHL totals			96	5	9	14	22	—	—	—	—	—

=== International ===
Year	Team	Event	Result	GP	G	A	Pts	PIM
2005	United States	U17	5th	5	0	2	2	4
Junior totals				5	0	2	2	4

== Awards and honors ==
Award	Year	Ref
College
CCHA Rookie of the Month January, February	2009	
CCHA All-Rookie Team Honorable Mention	2009	
