= Enzo Guebey =

French ice hockey player (born 1999)

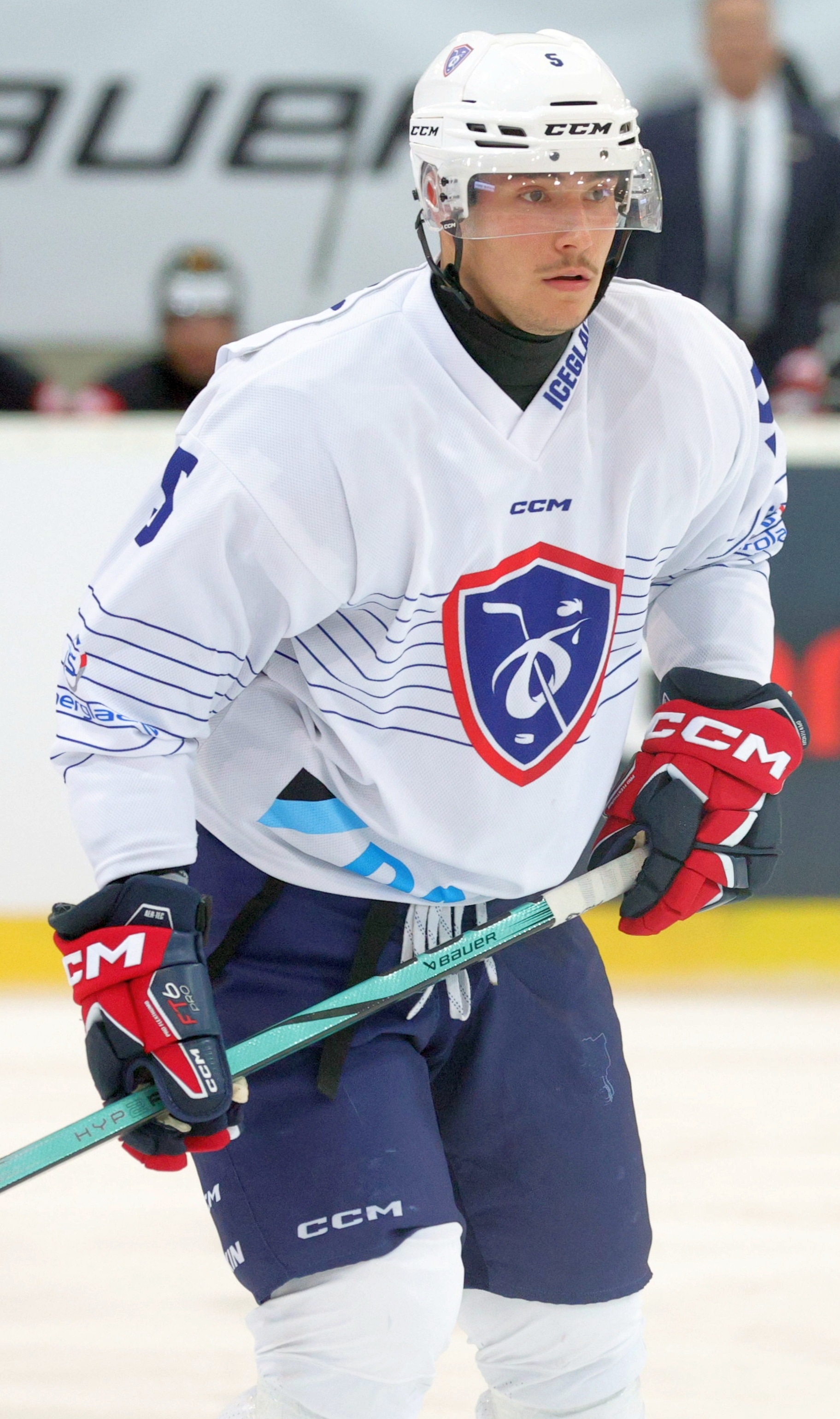
- Born: May 6, 1999 (age 26) Sallanches, France
- Height: 6 ft 2 in (188 cm)
- Weight: 200 lb (91 kg; 14 st 4 lb)
- Position: Defence
- Shoots: Right
- NL team Former teams: HC Davos; Genève-Servette HC; GCK Lions
- National team: France
- Playing career: 2017–present

Enzo Guebey (born May 6, 1999) is a French professional ice hockey player who is a defenceman for HC Davos of the National League (NL). He previously played with Genève-Servette HC of the NL and within the ZSC Lions/GCK Lions organization.

== Playing career ==
Guebey made his National League debut with Genève-Servette HC in the 2017-18 season, appearing in 16 NL games this season, while still being a member of Geneva's Elite Junior A team.

Guebey only played 6 games with HC La Chaux-de-Fonds of the Swiss League (SL) in 2018/19 because of a knee injury that required surgery and ended his season on October 11, 2018.

Guebey started the 2019–20 season on loan with HC Sierre of the Swiss League before being called up by Genève-Servette on September 16, 2019, to replace injured Mike Vollmin. On September 26, 2019, Guebey was reassigned to HC Sierre. He went on to play the remainder of the season with Sierre, appearing in 30 games and racking up 4 points (2 goals) in the SL and played an additional 4 games in the relegation round before the season was cancelled in March 2020.

Guebey was sent down to the HCB Ticino Rockets of the Swiss League to begin the 2020/21 season. He was called up on December 23, 2020, to dress up as the 7th defenseman following injuries to 3 other defensemen on the team. On December 30, 2020, Guebey received a game misconduct following a knee-on-knee collision with Lausanne HC's Charles Hudon. He was suspended for one game and fined CHF 1,000.

On May 14, 2021, Guebey was signed to a two-year, two-way contract by the ZSC Lions as a free agent.

On October 27, 2023, Guebey was loaned to HC Davos for a few games with agreement to return to the GCK lions afterwards. On October 31, 2023, the ZSC Lions agreed to permanently move Guebey to HC Davos for the remainder of his contract.

== Personal life ==
Guebey was born and grew up in Sallanches, France located just 50 kilometers southeast of Geneva, which allowed him to play all of his junior hockey with Genève-Servette.

He plays in Switzerland with a Swiss player-license but doesn't hold Swiss citizenship.
