= Yoan Massimino =

Swiss ice hockey player

- Born: February 22, 1997 (age 28) Geneva, Switzerland
- Height: 5 ft 8 in (173 cm)
- Weight: 175 lb (79 kg; 12 st 7 lb)
- Position: right winger
- Shot: Right
- Played for: Genève-Servette HC; HC Sierre
- Playing career: 2016–2020

Yoan Massimino (born 22 February 1997) is a Swiss former professional ice hockey right winger. He played with Genève-Servette HC of the National League (NL) and with HC Sierre of the Swiss League (SL).

== Playing career ==
Massimino played junior hockey with Genève-Servette HC U20 team. During the 2015–16 season, he was loaned to HC Ajoie and made his professional debut in the Swiss League (SL) appearing in 2 regular season games. Massimino played his final year of junior hockey in the 2016–17 season, appearing in 28 games and tallying 40 points. He also made his National League (NL) debut this season with Genève-Servette, playing 15 games and scoring 2 goals.

Massimino played his first full professional season in 2017–18 on loan with the HCB Ticino Rockets. He was limited to 13 regular season games. The 2018–19 season was the last year of his contract with Servette and he only played one game with the team in the NL. He spent the rest of the season on loan with HC Sierre of the MySports League and was a huge factor in the team's promotion to the SL, putting up 29 points in 29 regular season games and an additional 11 points in 11 playoffs games. At the end of the season, he was signed to a one-year contract by HC Sierre for their first season back in the SL. Massimino retired from professional hockey following the 2019–20 season.

== International play ==
Massimino appeared in a few exhibition games with Switzerland U18 national team.
