= Raffaele Sannitz =

Swiss ice hockey player

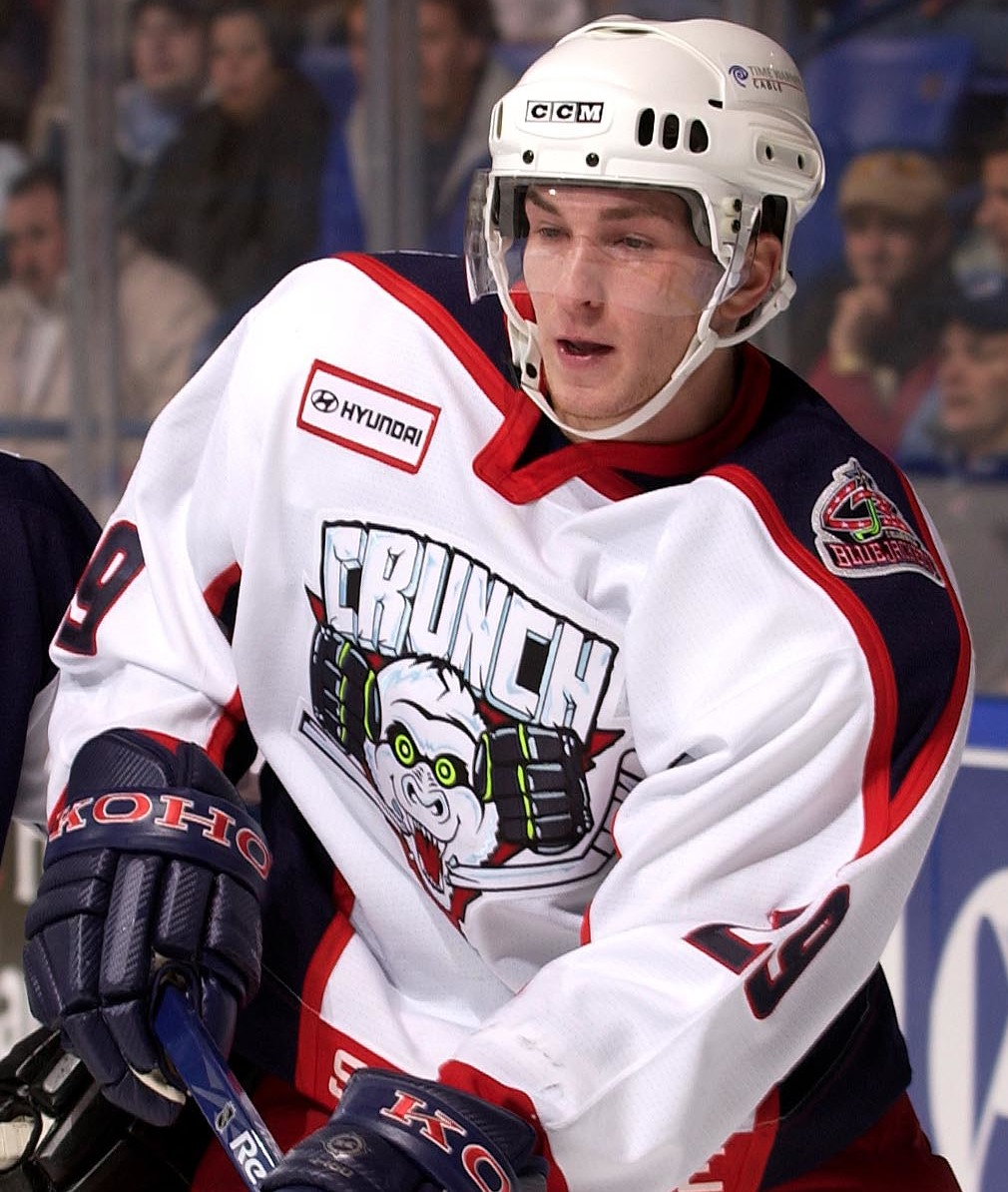
- Sannitz with the Syracuse Crunch in 2004
- Born: May 18, 1983 (age 42); Lugano, Switzerland
- Height: 6 ft 2 in (188 cm)
- Weight: 220 lb (100 kg; 15 st 10 lb)
- Position: Left wing
- Shot: Left
- Played for: HC Lugano; Syracuse Crunch; Kloten Flyers
- National team: Switzerland
- NHL draft: 204th overall, 2001; Columbus Blue Jackets
- Playing career: 2000–2021

Raffaele Sannitz (born May 18, 1983, in Lugano, Switzerland) is a Swiss former professional ice hockey Left wing who most notably played with HC Lugano of the National League (NL). He competed for Switzerland at the 2010 Winter Olympics.

== Career statistics ==
=== Regular season and playoffs ===
| | | | Regular season | | | | | Playoffs |
| Season | Team | League | GP | G | A | Pts | PIM | GP | G | A | Pts | PIM |
|---|---|---|---|---|---|---|---|---|---|---|---|---|
| 1999–2000 | HC Lugano | SUI U20 | 33 | 13 | 16 | 29 | 47 | — | — | — | — | — |
| 1999–2000 | HC Lugano | NLA | 1 | 0 | 0 | 0 | 2 | — | — | — | — | — |
| 2000–01 | HC Lugano | SUI U20 | 35 | 22 | 30 | 52 | 152 | 2 | 0 | 0 | 0 | 0 |
| 2000–01 | HC Lugano | NLA | 13 | 1 | 0 | 1 | 0 | 2 | 0 | 0 | 0 | 0 |
| 2000–01 | HC Sierre | NLB | 2 | 0 | 0 | 0 | 0 | — | — | — | — | — |
| 2001–02 | HC Lugano | SUI U20 | 14 | 14 | 13 | 27 | 18 | 3 | 3 | 2 | 5 | 4 |
| 2001–02 | HC Lugano | NLA | 38 | 3 | 4 | 7 | 37 | 12 | 1 | 1 | 2 | 2 |
| 2002–03 | HC Lugano | SUI U20 | 4 | 3 | 6 | 9 | 2 | — | — | — | — | — |
| 2002–03 | HC Lugano | NLA | 14 | 1 | 1 | 2 | 35 | — | — | — | — | — |
| 2003–04 | HC Lugano | NLA | 48 | 7 | 9 | 16 | 18 | 16 | 2 | 1 | 3 | 8 |
| 2003–04 | EHC Chur | NLB | 2 | 1 | 2 | 3 | 2 | — | — | — | — | — |
| 2004–05 | Syracuse Crunch | AHL | 53 | 6 | 3 | 9 | 38 | — | — | — | — | — |
| 2004–05 | Dayton Bombers | ECHL | 2 | 0 | 3 | 3 | 0 | — | — | — | — | — |
| 2005–06 | HC Lugano | NLA | 33 | 6 | 9 | 15 | 85 | 17 | 4 | 8 | 12 | 16 |
| 2006–07 | HC Lugano | NLA | 38 | 6 | 20 | 26 | 50 | 6 | 3 | 3 | 6 | 41 |
| 2007–08 | HC Lugano | NLA | 50 | 7 | 10 | 17 | 36 | — | — | — | — | — |
| 2008–09 | HC Lugano | NLA | 43 | 5 | 14 | 19 | 64 | 7 | 4 | 0 | 4 | 10 |
| 2009–10 | HC Lugano | NLA | 32 | 4 | 12 | 16 | 74 | 4 | 1 | 2 | 3 | 20 |
| 2010–11 | HC Lugano | NLA | 40 | 5 | 8 | 13 | 38 | — | — | — | — | — |
| 2011–12 | HC Lugano | NLA | 43 | 4 | 10 | 14 | 32 | 6 | 0 | 1 | 1 | 0 |
| 2012–13 | HC Lugano | NLA | 2 | 0 | 0 | 0 | 0 | — | — | — | — | — |
| 2012–13 | Kloten Flyers | NLA | 37 | 5 | 8 | 13 | 34 | — | — | — | — | — |
| 2013–14 | HC Lugano | NLA | 45 | 4 | 8 | 12 | 42 | 5 | 1 | 2 | 3 | 4 |
| 2014–15 | HC Lugano | NLA | 48 | 1 | 12 | 13 | 36 | 6 | 1 | 1 | 2 | 2 |
| 2015–16 | HC Lugano | NLA | 39 | 10 | 6 | 16 | 20 | 15 | 1 | 1 | 2 | 47 |
| 2016–17 | HC Lugano | NLA | 48 | 6 | 3 | 9 | 49 | 11 | 2 | 4 | 6 | 10 |
| 2017–18 | HC Lugano | NL | 43 | 4 | 12 | 16 | 24 | 18 | 5 | 10 | 15 | 26 |
| 2018–19 | HC Lugano | NL | 48 | 11 | 29 | 40 | 64 | 4 | 1 | 2 | 3 | 0 |
| 2019–20 | HC Lugano | NL | 49 | 6 | 11 | 17 | 26 | — | — | — | — | — |
| 2020–21 | HC Lugano | NL | 42 | 2 | 4 | 6 | 12 | 5 | 0 | 2 | 2 | 0 |
| NL totals | | | 794 | 98 | 190 | 288 | 778 | 134 | 26 | 38 | 64 | 186 |

=== International ===
| Year | Team | Event | Result | GP | G | A | Pts | PIM |
|---|---|---|---|---|---|---|---|---|
| 1999 | Switzerland | WJC18 | 4th | 7 | 1 | 1 | 2 | 18 |
| 2001 | Switzerland | WJC18 | 2nd place, silver medalist(s) | 7 | 2 | 2 | 4 | 12 |
| 2002 | Switzerland | WJC | 4th | 7 | 1 | 0 | 1 | 10 |
| 2006 | Switzerland | WC | 9th | 6 | 2 | 0 | 2 | 10 |
| 2007 | Switzerland | WC | 8th | 2 | 0 | 0 | 0 | 0 |
| 2008 | Switzerland | WC | 7th | 7 | 2 | 2 | 4 | 10 |
| 2009 | Switzerland | WC | 9th | 6 | 0 | 0 | 0 | 2 |
| 2010 | Switzerland | OG | 8th | 5 | 1 | 1 | 2 | 8 |
| Junior totals | | | | 21 | 4 | 3 | 7 | 40 |
| Senior totals | | | | 26 | 5 | 3 | 8 | 30 |
