= Kévin Bozon =

French ice hockey player (born 1995)

- Born: 30 December 1995 (age 30) Chamonix, France
- Height: 187 cm (6 ft 2 in)
- Weight: 93 kg (205 lb; 14 st 9 lb)
- Position: Winger
- Shoots: Left
- NL team Former teams: HC Ajoie; EHC Winterthur
- National team: France
- Playing career: 2017–present

Kévin Bozon (born 30 December 1995) is a French professional ice hockey player who is a winger for HC Ajoie of the National League (NL).

== Playing career ==
On 28 February 2025, Bozon received a one-game suspension for boarding.

== International play ==
Bozon represented the France national team at the 2026 Winter Olympics and the 2022, 2023, 2024, and 2025 IIHF World Championship.

== Personal life ==
In 2024, Bozon was diagnosed with Crohn's disease.

His grandfather Alain Bozon, father Philippe Bozon, and brother Tim Bozon all also played ice hockey.

== Career statistics ==
=== Regular season and playoffs ===
			Regular season					Playoffs
Season	Team	League	GP	G	A	Pts	PIM	GP	G	A	Pts	PIM
2010–11	HC Lugano U17	Novizen Elite	24	3	4	7	4	2	0	0	0	0
2011–12	HC Lugano U17	Novizen Elite	31	9	31	40	82	9	9	8	17	16
2011–12	HC Lugano U20	Elite Jr. A	11	0	1	1	6	—	—	—	—	—
2012–13	HC Lugano U17	Novizen Elite	13	7	14	21	6	—	—	—	—	—
2012–13	HC Lugano U20	Elite Jr. A	21	4	7	11	4	4	1	1	2	0
2013–14	HC Lugano U20	Elite Jr. A	34	12	11	23	24	9	0	0	0	0
2014–15	HC La Chaux-de-Fonds U20	Elite Jr. A	37	23	16	39	55	10	8	5	13	10
2015–16	HC La Chaux-de-Fonds	NLB	39	3	5	8	41	2	0	0	0	0
2016–17	HC Ajoie	NLB	44	5	8	13	20	9	0	0	0	0
2017–18	EHC Winterthur	SL	32	8	9	17	18	—	—	—	—	—
2018–19	EHC Winterthur	SL	41	3	13	16	32	—	—	—	—	—
2019–20	EHC Winterthur	SL	42	11	13	24	39	4	1	1	2	4
2020–21	EHC Winterthur	SL	45	9	15	24	10	—	—	—	—	—
2021–22	EHC Winterthur	SL	48	14	20	34	20	2	0	0	0	0
2021–22	HC Ajoie	NL	3	0	0	0	2	—	—	—	—	—
2022–23	HC Ajoie	NL	46	4	6	10	14	6	2	1	3	2
2023–24	HC Ajoie	NL	38	4	2	6	6	—	—	—	—	—
2024–25	HC Ajoie	NL	43	0	4	4	27	4	0	0	0	0
2025–26	HC Ajoie	NL	35	0	2	2	6	—	—	—	—	—
NL totals			165	8	14	22	55	10	2	1	3	2

=== International ===
Year	Team	Event	GP	G	A	Pts	PIM
2013	France U18	WJC-18 (D1A)	5	1	5	6	16
2014	France U20	WJC-20 (D1B)	5	0	3	3	2
2015	France U20	WJC-20 (D1B)	5	0	0	0	0
2022	France	WC	7	0	0	0	6
2023	France	WC	7	0	0	0	2
2024	France	WC	7	0	1	1	2
2025	France	WC	7	1	0	1	4
2026	France	OG	4	0	0	0	4
2026	France	WC (D1A)	5	0	0	0	0
Junior totals			15	1	8	9	18
Senior totals			37	1	1	2	18
