= Hans Pienitz =

American-born German ice hockey player

- Born: January 27, 1988 (age 37); Miami, Florida, U.S.
- Height: 5 ft 10 in (178 cm)
- Weight: 165 lb (75 kg; 11 st 11 lb)
- Position: Defence
- Shoots: Right
- NLB team Former teams: EHC Basel; ZSC Lions; Hamburg Freezers
- National team: Germany
- Playing career: 2005–present

Hans Pienitz (born January 27, 1988) is an American-born German professional ice hockey defenceman who currently plays for EHC Basel of the Swiss National League B (NLB).
