= Romano Lemm =

Swiss professional ice hockey forward (born 1984)

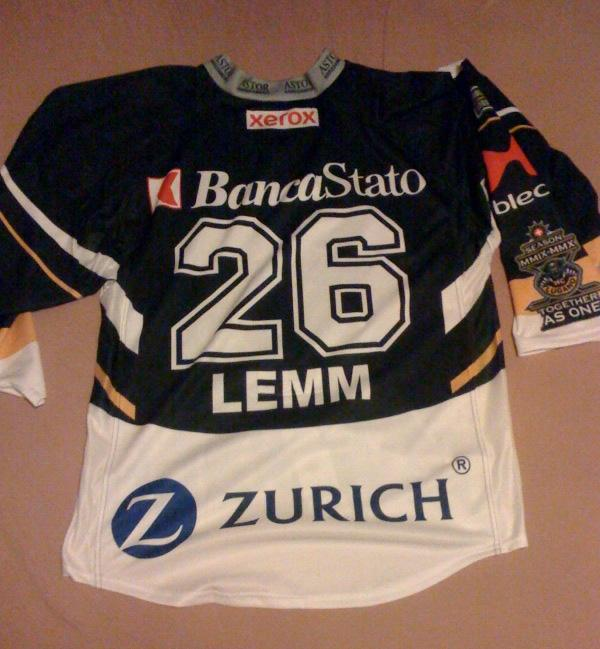
- Born: June 25, 1984 (age 41); Dielsdorf, Switzerland
- Height: 5 ft 11 in (180 cm)
- Weight: 189 lb (86 kg; 13 st 7 lb)
- Position: Forward
- Shot: Right
- Played for: EHC Kloten; HC Lugano
- National team: Switzerland
- Playing career: 2000–2020

Romano Lemm (born 25 June 1984 in Dielsdorf, Switzerland) is a Swiss former professional ice hockey forward who most notably played for EHC Kloten of the National League.

== Playing career ==
On December 3, 2014, he agreed to a three-year contract extension with Kloten worth CHF 2 million.

== International play ==
He participated at the 2010 IIHF World Championship as a member of the Switzerland men's national ice hockey team.

== Career statistics ==
=== Regular season and playoffs ===
			Regular season					Playoffs
Season	Team	League	GP	G	A	Pts	PIM	GP	G	A	Pts	PIM
1999–2000	EHC Kloten	SUI U20	26	10	13	23	8	1	0	0	0	25
2000–01	Kloten Flyers	SUI U20	31	19	29	48	18	6	3	9	12	0
2000–01	HC Thurgau	SUI.2	1	0	0	0	0	—	—	—	—	—
2001–02	Kloten Flyers	SUI U20	9	9	7	16	6	3	4	1	5	2
2001–02	EHC Wetzikon	SUI.3	4	0	0	0		—	—	—	—	—
2001–02	Kloten Flyers	NLA	—	—	—	—	—	11	5	2	7	0
2002–03	Kloten Flyers	NLA	40	4	3	7	12	5	2	1	3	2
2002–03	Kloten Flyers	SUI U20	—	—	—	—	—	1	0	0	0	0
2003–04	Kloten Flyers	NLA	19	6	1	7	6	—	—	—	—	—
2004–05	Kloten Flyers	NLA	44	9	16	25	6	—	—	—	—	—
2005–06	Kloten Flyers	NLA	43	6	9	15	14	11	3	5	8	4
2006–07	Kloten Flyers	NLA	44	17	14	31	20	11	4	3	7	20
2007–08	Kloten Flyers	NLA	49	14	16	30	36	3	0	1	1	27
2008–09	HC Lugano	NLA	19	4	7	11	2	7	0	1	1	0
2009–10	HC Lugano	NLA	41	9	7	16	20	4	5	0	5	0
2010–11	Kloten Flyers	NLA	41	9	11	20	60	16	1	5	6	10
2011–12	Kloten Flyers	NLA	18	9	6	15	10	—	—	—	—	—
2012–13	Kloten Flyers	NLA	24	2	6	8	6	5	0	2	2	4
2013–14	Kloten Flyers	NLA	50	5	9	14	16	16	3	3	6	6
2014–15	Kloten Flyers	NLA	42	7	11	18	22	4	0	2	2	0
2015–16	Kloten Flyers	NLA	46	1	5	6	12	4	0	1	1	4
2016–17	EHC Kloten	NLA	49	4	3	7	20	—	—	—	—	—
2017–18	EHC Kloten	NL	17	1	1	2	4	—	—	—	—	—
2018–19	EHC Kloten	SL	37	8	14	22	14	5	0	0	0	4
2019–20	EHC Kloten	SL	39	12	6	18	22	5	1	2	3	0
NL totals			586	107	125	232	266	88	23	22	45	73

=== International ===
Year	Team	Event	GP	G	A	Pts	PIM
2001	Switzerland	WJC18	7	1	5	6	4
2002	Switzerland	WJC18	8	3	3	6	4
2003	Switzerland	WJC	6	0	0	0	2
2005	Switzerland	OGQ	3	1	0	1	2
2005	Switzerland	WC	7	1	3	4	0
2006	Switzerland	OG	6	2	0	2	8
2006	Switzerland	WC	6	0	2	2	2
2007	Switzerland	WC	7	0	4	4	6
2008	Switzerland	WC	7	1	0	1	2
2009	Switzerland	WC	6	2	1	3	0
2010	Switzerland	OG	5	2	0	2	2
2010	Switzerland	WC	7	0	0	0	2
2011	Switzerland	WC	4	0	1	1	2
Junior totals			21	4	8	12	10
Senior totals			58	9	11	20	26
