= Goran Bezina =

Swiss ice hockey player (born 1980)

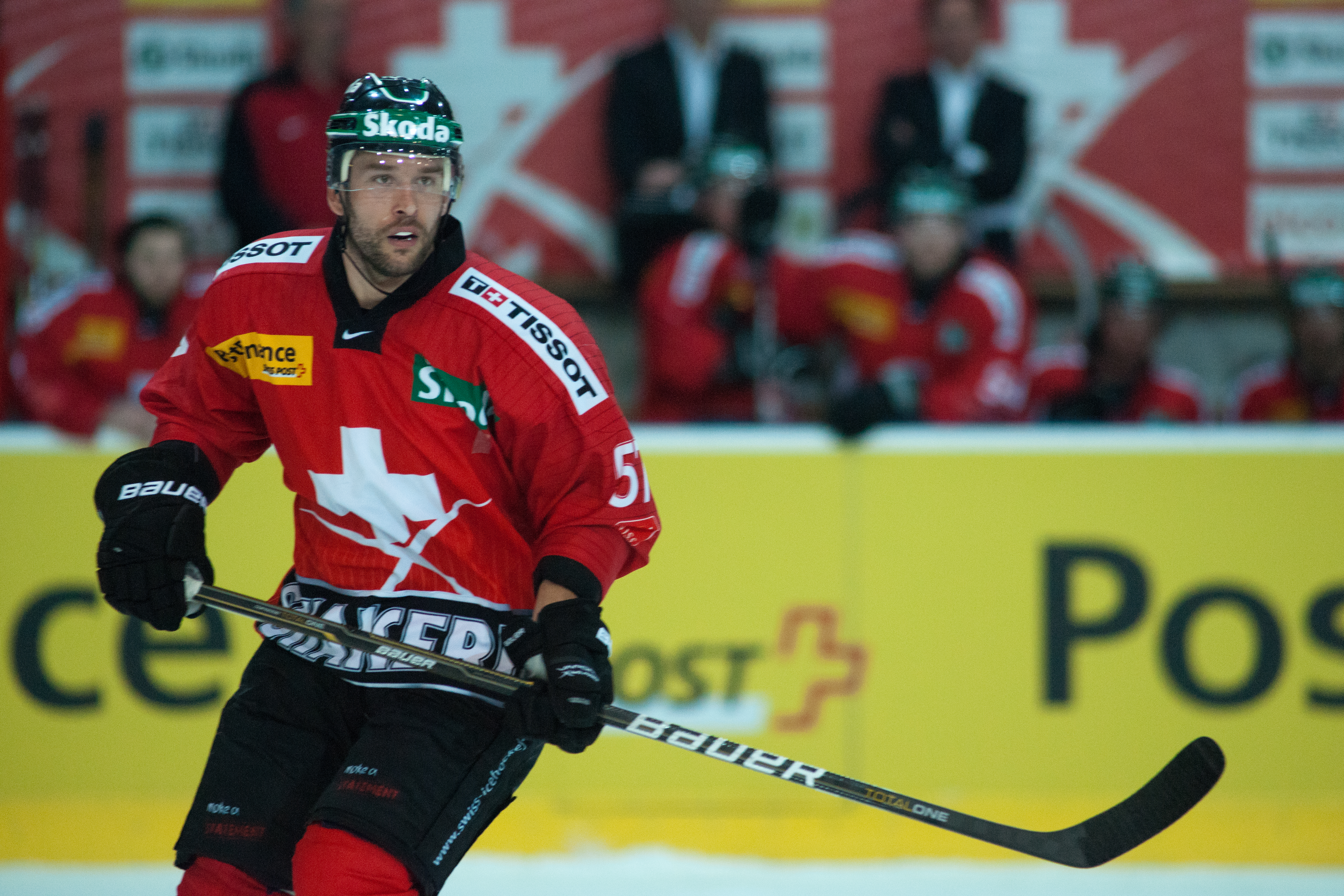
- Born: 21 March 1980 (age 46) Split, SR Croatia, SFR Yugoslavia
- Height: 6 ft 3 in (191 cm)
- Weight: 225 lb (102 kg; 16 st 1 lb)
- Position: Defence
- Shot: Left
- Played for: HC Fribourg-Gottéron; Phoenix Coyotes; Medveščak Zagreb; Genève-Servette HC; HC Sierre
- National team: Switzerland
- NHL draft: 234th overall, 1999; Phoenix Coyotes
- Playing career: 1997–2022

Goran Bezina (born 21 March 1980) is a Swiss former professional ice hockey defenseman who played most of his career with Genève-Servette HC of the National League (NL). He also played with the Arizona Coyotes in the National Hockey League (NHL), Medveščak Zagreb of the Kontinental Hockey League (KHL) HC Fribourg-Gottéron of the NL and HC Sierre of the Swiss League (SL).

== Playing career ==
As a youth, Bezina played in the 1994 Quebec International Pee-Wee Hockey Tournament with a team from Switzerland.

A product of Monthey-Chablais HC, Bezina made his debut in the Swiss top-flight National League A (NLA) for HC Fribourg-Gottéron during the 1998–99 season and was drafted 234th overall by the Phoenix Coyotes in the 1999 NHL entry draft. From 2001 to 2004, he played within the Phoenix Coyotes organization with three NHL appearances for the Coyotes and 204 contests for their AHL affiliate, the Springfield Falcons.

Bezina spent most of his professional career with Genève-Servette HC of the National League A (NLA) and left the club after twelve years (ten of those as a captain) upon the conclusion of the 2015–16 season. In the course of his Genève-Servette stint, Bezina appeared in 639 NLA contests, scoring 384 points. In June 2016, he put pen to paper on a contract with Medvescak Zagreb of the Kontinental Hockey League (KHL), but returned to Genève-Servette on 31 January 2017. He eventually played 10 games with the team this year, tallying 3 assists. At the end of the season, Bezina was not offered a contract extension, making him a free agent.

On 1 September 2017, a few days before the start of the 2017–18 season, Bezina unexpectedly returned to Geneva on a 1-year deal worth CHF 750,000. He agreed to reduce his salary to play his 14th season with the Grenats. On 17 April 2018 Bezina agreed to a one-year contract extension with Geneva worth CHF 700,000.

On 2 August 2019 Bezina joined freshly promoted HC Sierre of the Swiss League (SL) on a one-year deal. On 5 May 2020 Bezina agreed to a one-year contract extension to remain with HC Sierre through the 2020/21 season. On 22 June 2021 Bezina signed a new one-year contract extension with Sierre for the 2021/22 season.

On 17 August 2022 Bezina officially retired from professional hockey.

== International play ==
Representing the Swiss national team, Bezina played at the 2006 Olympic Games and eleven World Championships.

== Career statistics ==
=== Regular season and playoffs ===
			Regular season					Playoffs
Season	Team	League	GP	G	A	Pts	PIM	GP	G	A	Pts	PIM
1997–98	Villars HC	SUI–3	24	7	5	12	—	—	—	—	—	—
1998–99	HC Fribourg–Gottéron	SUI U20	22	11	6	17	64	7	2	3	5	2
1998–99	HC Fribourg–Gottéron	NDA	38	0	0	0	14	—	—	—	—	—
1999–2000	HC Fribourg–Gottéron	SUI U20	2	0	1	1	16	2	1	1	2	8
1999–2000	HC Fribourg–Gottéron	NLA	44	3	6	9	10	4	0	0	0	6
1999–2000	EHC Visp	SUI–2	2	0	0	0	2	—	—	—	—	—
2000–01	HC Fribourg–Gottéron	NLA	44	10	10	20	44	5	1	1	2	12
2001–02	Springfield Falcons	AHL	66	2	11	13	50	—	—	—	—	—
2002–03	Springfield Falcons	AHL	64	3	4	7	27	6	0	1	1	0
2003–04	Phoenix Coyotes	NHL	3	0	0	0	2	—	—	—	—	—
2003–04	Springfield Falcons	AHL	74	11	10	21	65	—	—	—	—	—
2004–05	Genève–Servette HC	NLA	33	7	12	19	51	4	0	0	0	8
2005–06	Genève–Servette HC	NLA	32	8	14	22	38	5	1	2	3	33
2006–07	Genève–Servette HC	NLA	41	13	20	33	72	5	0	0	0	5
2006–07	EC Red Bull Salzburg	AUT	1	1	0	1	2	8	4	8	12	12
2007–08	Genève–Servette HC	NLA	48	11	25	36	46	16	4	6	10	16
2008–09	Genève–Servette HC	NLA	48	11	19	30	97	4	1	2	3	2
2009–10	Genève–Servette HC	NLA	47	7	19	26	34	20	4	12	16	22
2010–11	Genève–Servette HC	NLA	50	8	22	30	70	6	4	3	7	29
2011–12	Genève–Servette HC	NLA	50	7	20	27	58	—	—	—	—	—
2012–13	Genève–Servette HC	NLA	46	10	21	31	40	—	—	—	—	—
2013–14	Genève–Servette HC	NLA	50	8	24	32	81	12	0	4	4	35
2014–15	Genève–Servette HC	NLA	40	2	14	16	24	12	2	3	5	12
2015–16	Genève–Servette HC	NLA	50	6	13	19	73	11	0	6	6	8
2016–17	KHL Medveščak Zagreb	KHL	56	4	11	15	57	—	—	—	—	—
2016–17	Genève–Servette HC	NLA	6	0	3	3	2	4	0	0	0	8
2017–18	Genève–Servette HC	NL	36	5	6	11	34	5	0	0	0	4
2018–19	Genève–Servette HC	NL	42	3	5	8	20	6	0	0	0	6
2019–20	HC Sierre	SUI–2	32	3	9	12	39	—	—	—	—	—
2020–21	HC Sierre	SUI–2	46	6	17	23	52	4	1	1	2	12
2021–22	HC Sierre	SUI–2	49	3	13	16	57	6	1	1	2	6
NDA/NLA/NL totals			745	119	253	372	808	132	19	47	66	221
AHL totals			204	16	25	41	142	6	0	1	1	0
NHL totals			3	0	0	0	2	—	—	—	—	—

=== International ===
Year	Team	Event	GP	G	A	Pts	PIM
1998	Switzerland	EJC	6	0	1	1	6
1999	Switzerland	WJC	6	1	1	2	2
2000	Switzerland	WJC	7	0	0	0	8
2001	Switzerland	WC	6	0	1	1	43
2003	Switzerland	WC	6	1	1	2	0
2004	Switzerland	WC	7	0	1	1	4
2005	Switzerland	OGQ	3	0	0	0	0
2005	Switzerland	WC	7	1	0	1	8
2006	Switzerland	OG	6	0	2	2	0
2006	Switzerland	WC	6	2	1	3	4
2007	Switzerland	WC	7	1	1	2	6
2008	Switzerland	WC	7	0	2	2	6
2009	Switzerland	WC	6	0	0	0	6
2010	Switzerland	WC	7	0	2	2	16
2011	Switzerland	WC	3	1	0	1	4
2012	Switzerland	WC	5	1	1	2	29
Junior totals			19	1	2	3	16
Senior totals			76	7	12	19	126
