= Philippe Furrer =

Swiss ice hockey player (born 1985)

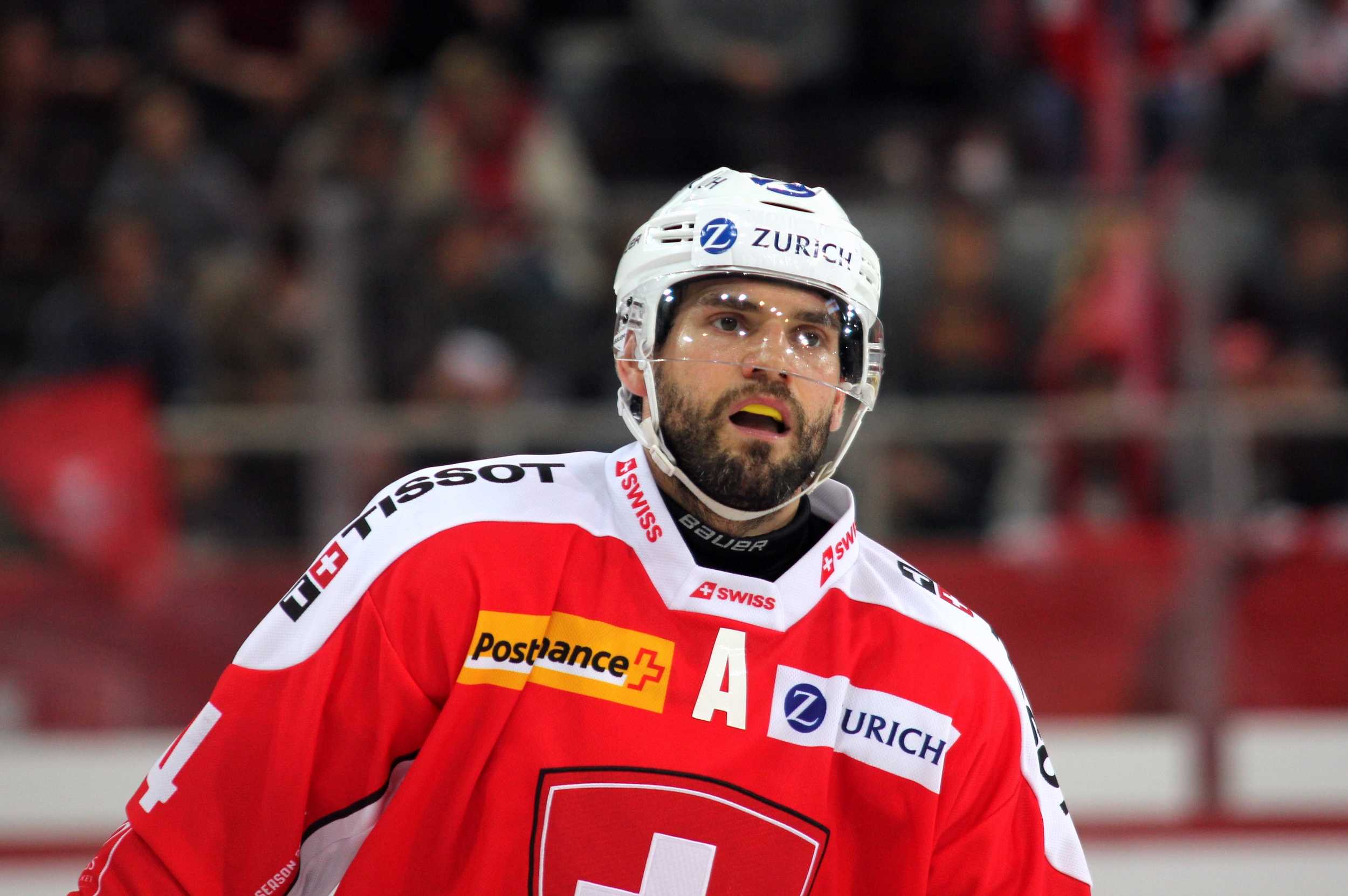
- Born: June 16, 1985 (age 40) Bern, Switzerland
- Height: 6 ft 1 in (185 cm)
- Weight: 203 lb (92 kg; 14 st 7 lb)
- Position: Defence
- Shot: Left
- Played for: SC Bern; HC Lugano; HC Fribourg-Gottéron
- National team: Switzerland
- NHL draft: 179th overall, 2003; New York Rangers
- Playing career: 2002–2022

Philippe Furrer (born June 16, 1985) is a Swiss former professional ice hockey player who played in the National League (NL). Furrer became a partner at IMMOSEEKER AG in 2018, and later assumed the role of CEO in 2024, after previously being the owner and head of acquisition at the company.

== Playing career ==
He was selected by the New York Rangers in the 6th round (179th overall) of the 2003 NHL entry draft.

Furrer joined Lugano on a three-year contract on April 11, 2015, after playing with SC Bern from the age of 6 and spending the entirety of his professional career, 14 seasons, with Bern.

== International play ==
Furrer participated at the 2011 IIHF World Championship as a member of the Switzerland men's national ice hockey team.

== Career statistics ==
=== Regular season and playoffs ===
			Regular season					Playoffs
Season	Team	League	GP	G	A	Pts	PIM	GP	G	A	Pts	PIM
2001–02	SC Bern	SUI U20	29	5	11	16	31	1	0	0	0	0
2001–02	SC Bern	NLA	8	0	0	0	0	—	—	—	—	—
2001–02	EHC Rot–Blau Bern	SUI.3	4	1	0	1	0	—	—	—	—	—
2002–03	SC Bern	SUI U20	11	1	11	12	12	2	0	1	1	0
2002–03	SC Bern	NLA	27	0	1	1	6	13	0	0	0	2
2004–05	SC Bern	NLA	37	3	3	6	14	11	1	1	2	4
2005–06	SC Bern	NLA	29	1	0	1	14	—	—	—	—	—
2005–06	SC Langenthal	NLB	2	0	0	0	0	—	—	—	—	—
2006–07	SC Bern	NLA	16	3	2	5	41	12	0	0	0	4
2007–08	SC Bern	NLA	43	6	16	22	54	2	0	0	0	14
2008–09	SC Bern	NLA	36	4	12	16	32	6	0	1	1	6
2009–10	SC Bern	NLA	30	5	5	10	65	15	0	4	4	14
2010–11	SC Bern	NLA	38	3	9	12	50	11	0	4	4	4
2011–12	SC Bern	NLA	43	6	15	21	48	17	1	8	9	4
2012–13	SC Bern	NLA	36	0	11	11	36	18	2	3	5	16
2013–14	SC Bern	NLA	16	3	5	8	14	—	—	—	—	—
2014–15	SC Bern	NLA	35	2	11	13	20	11	1	3	4	6
2015–16	HC Lugano	NLA	35	1	13	14	20	15	2	2	4	16
2016–17	HC Lugano	NLA	38	4	11	15	24	11	0	2	2	12
2017–18	HC Lugano	NL	37	2	12	14	26	18	1	9	10	6
2018–19	HC Fribourg–Gottéron	NL	25	0	7	7	20	—	—	—	—	—
2019–20	HC Fribourg–Gottéron	NL	38	2	6	8	32	—	—	—	—	—
2020–21	HC Fribourg–Gottéron	NL	29	0	5	5	22	5	0	1	1	6
2021–22	HC Fribourg–Gottéron	NL	43	1	2	3	30	9	1	2	3	6
NL totals			639	46	146	192	568	174	9	40	49	120

Medal record

Ice hockey

Representing Switzerland

World Championships
Silver medal – second place	2013 Sweden/Finland	

=== International ===
Year	Team	Event	Result	GP	G	A	Pts	PIM
2002	Switzerland	WJC18	7th	8	2	0	2	0
2003	Switzerland	WJC	7th	6	0	0	0	4
2003	Switzerland	WJC18	9th	6	1	3	4	20
2005	Switzerland	WJC	8th	6	0	0	0	10
2008	Switzerland	WC	7th	7	1	1	2	16
2009	Switzerland	WC	9th	4	0	0	0	6
2010	Switzerland	OG	8th	5	0	1	1	2
2011	Switzerland	WC	9th	6	0	0	0	4
2012	Switzerland	WC	11th	7	0	1	1	0
2013	Switzerland	WC	2nd place, silver medalist(s)	10	0	1	1	4
2017	Switzerland	WC	6th	7	0	0	0	4
2018	Switzerland	OG	10th	4	0	0	0	0
Junior totals				26	3	3	6	34
Senior totals				50	1	4	5	36
