= Nussbaumen =

Nussbaumen may refer to the following places in Switzerland:

- Nussbaumen, Thurgau, a village and former municipality in Hüttwilen, canton of Thurgau
- Nussbaumen, a village in Obersiggenthal, canton of Aargau
- Nussbaumen am Dettenberg, a hamlet in Bülach, canton of Zurich
