= Dominique Slongo =

Swiss ice hockey player

- Born: 13 October 1988 (age 37) Bern, Switzerland
- Height: 5 ft 2 in (157 cm)
- Weight: 121 lb (55 kg; 8 st 9 lb)
- Position: Goaltender
- Catches: Left
- National team: Switzerland
- Playing career: 2007–present

Dominique Slongo
Medal record

Women's ice hockey

Representing Switzerland

IIHF World Women's Championships
Bronze medal – third place	2012 United States	Tournament

Dominique Tanja Slongo (born 13 October 1988 in Bern, Switzerland) is a Swiss ice hockey goaltender.

== International career ==
Slongo was selected for the Switzerland national women's ice hockey team in the 2010 Winter Olympics. She played in part of one game, the final eight minutes of a loss to Canada. She stopped 7 shots, and did not allow a goal.

Slongo also appeared for Switzerland at three IIHF Women's World Championships. Her first appearance came in 2007 IIHF Women's World Championship, where she allowed one goals in nine minutes of playing time. She played in two games at the 2009 IIHF Women's World Championship, winning them both. She also played once at the 2013 IIHF Women's World Championship. She was on the roster for the 2008, 2011 and 2012 championships without playing any games, winning a bronze medal as the #3 goalie in 2012.

== Career statistics ==
=== International career ===
Year	Team	Event	GP	W	L	T	MIN	GA	SO	GAA	SV%
2007	Switzerland	WW	1	0	0	0	9:05	1	0	6.61	87.50
2009	Switzerland	WW	2	2	0	0	96:47	2	0	1.24	95.92
2010	Switzerland	Oly	1	0	0	0	8:05	0	0	0.00	100.00
2013	Switzerland	WW	1	0	0	0	12:23	3	0	14.54	80.00
