= Roman Wick =

Swiss ice hockey player (born 1985)

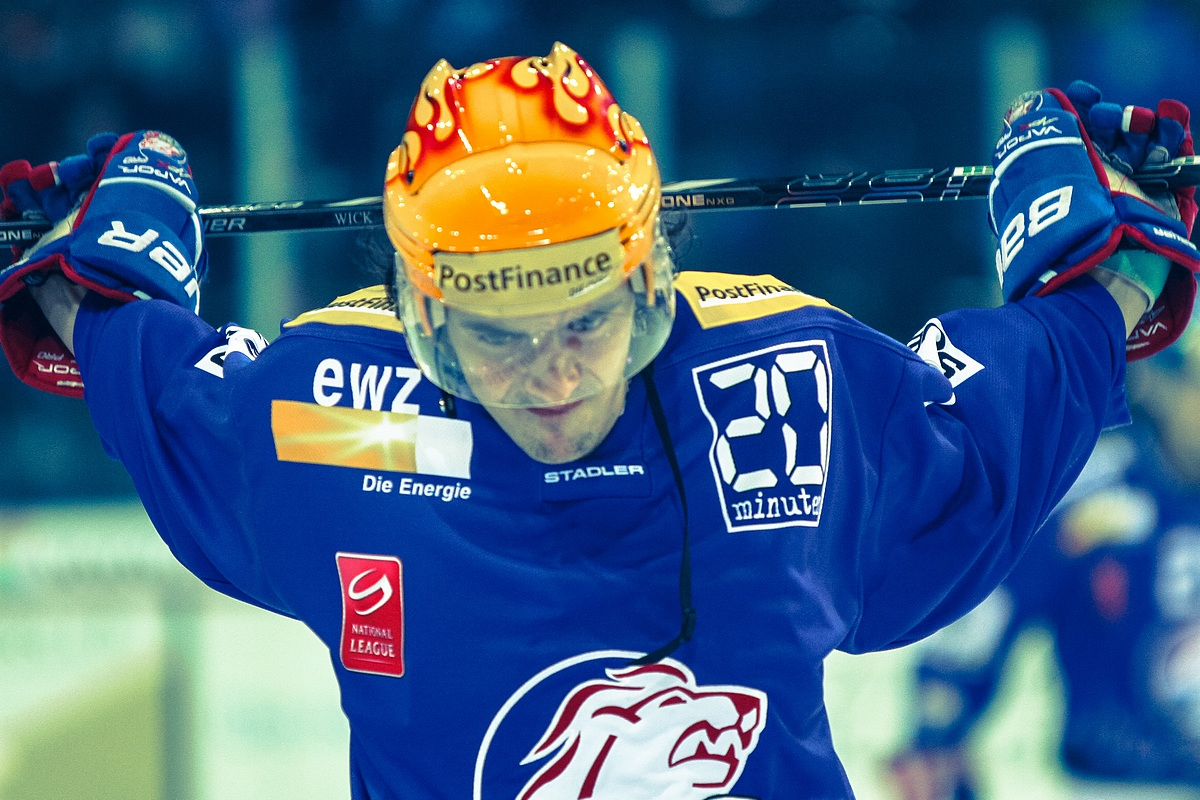
- Roman Wick with the ZSC Lions in 2014.
- Born: December 30, 1985 (age 40) Zuzwil, Switzerland
- Height: 6 ft 2 in (188 cm)
- Weight: 208 lb (94 kg; 14 st 12 lb)
- Position: Right wing
- Shot: Left
- Played for: Kloten Flyers; Ottawa Senators; ZSC Lions
- National team: Switzerland
- NHL draft: 156th overall, 2004; Ottawa Senators
- Playing career: 2002–2021

Roman Wick (born December 30, 1985) is a Swiss former professional ice hockey player. Wick played for EHC Kloten and ZSC Lions in the National League (NL) and for the Ottawa Senators of the National Hockey League (NHL). He was drafted in the fifth round (156th overall) of the 2004 NHL entry draft by the Senators who signed him to a one-year contract in 2010.

Internationally, Wick competed as a member of Switzerland's national team in the 2008 and 2009 IIHF World Championships, and at the 2010 and 2014 Winter Olympics.

== Playing career ==
As a youth, Wick played in the 1999 Quebec International Pee-Wee Hockey Tournament with a team from Zürich.

Roman Wick began his hockey career in 2002 with the Kloten Flyers, for whom he had already played in the junior leagues. He played two seasons with the Flyers in the NLA before being drafted by the Ottawa Senators in the 2004 NHL entry draft. Wick moved to the Western Hockey League (WHL) from 2004 to 2006 with the Red Deer Rebels and the Lethbridge Hurricanes. He returned to the Kloten Flyers for the 2006–07 season. After a tryout in 2007 with the Senators, he returned to Kloten for the 2007–08 season and played there for three seasons.

In July 2010, the Ottawa Senators signed Wick to a two-year, two-way contract. The deal had been rumored since June but was not finalized until July 14. After September training camp, Wick was assigned to the Ottawa Senator's affiliate team Binghamton Senators of the American Hockey League (AHL). Wick was called up to Ottawa in February 2011 and played his first NHL game on February 25, 2011, in Buffalo against the Buffalo Sabres.

In 2011, he moved back to Switzerland and played again for the Kloten Flyers after having signed a three-year deal. In the Summer of 2012, Wick moved to the rival team ZSC Lions following financial issues that involved his former Club.

On March 6, 2014, Wick agreed to a three-year contract extension for a reported CHF 2.4 million.

== International play ==
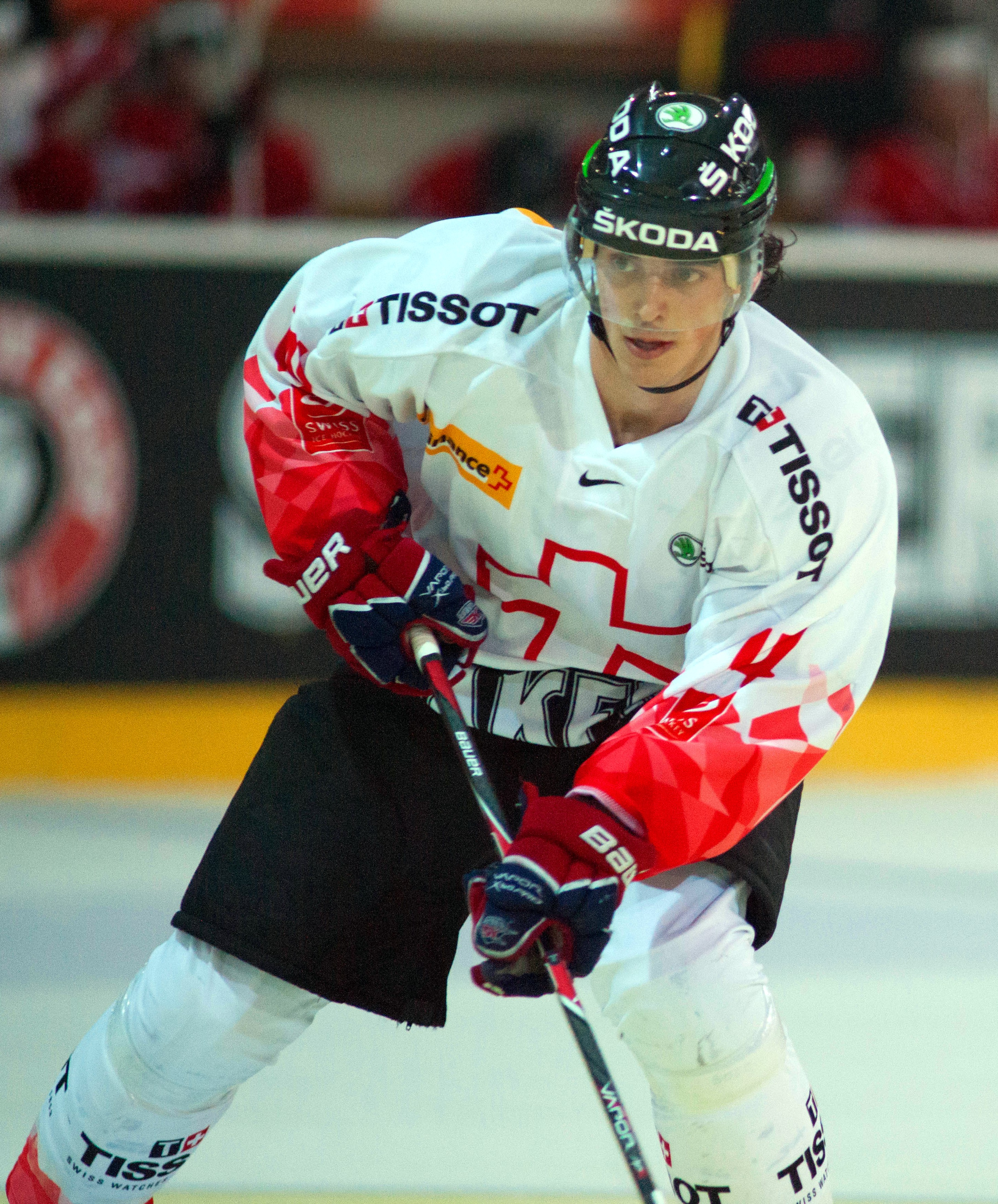
Wick with Switzerland in 2002.

Wick has represented Switzerland on the international stage at the World U18 Championships in 2003, the World U20 Championship in 2005, the World Championships in 2008 and 2009, and the Olympic Games in 2010.

== Career statistics ==
=== Regular season and playoffs ===
			Regular season					Playoffs
Season	Team	League	GP	G	A	Pts	PIM	GP	G	A	Pts	PIM
2000–01	Kloten Flyers	SUI U20	26	4	1	5	6	6	0	2	2	4
2001–02	Kloten Flyers	SUI U20	32	19	27	46	32	7	1	2	3	4
2001–02	EHC Wetzikon	SUI.3	4	2	1	3		—	—	—	—	—
2002–03	Kloten Flyers	SUI U20	28	29	22	51	68	2	0	1	1	0
2002–03	Kloten Flyers	NLA	9	1	0	1	4	1	0	0	0	0
2002–03	EHC Bülach	SUI.3	11	6	2	8	18	—	—	—	—	—
2003–04	Kloten Flyers	NLA	20	1	1	2	2	—	—	—	—	—
2003–04	Kloten Flyers	SUI U20	17	15	12	27	76	—	—	—	—	—
2003–04	GC Küsnacht Lions	SUI.2	6	4	0	4	6	—	—	—	—	—
2004–05	Red Deer Rebels	WHL	66	32	38	70	25	7	1	2	3	6
2005–06	Red Deer Rebels	WHL	23	7	10	17	8	—	—	—	—	—
2005–06	Lethbridge Hurricanes	WHL	38	14	17	31	20	6	4	3	7	6
2006–07	Kloten Flyers	NLA	44	12	11	23	20	11	1	1	2	2
2007–08	Kloten Flyers	NLA	50	12	15	27	46	4	1	2	3	2
2008–09	Kloten Flyers	NLA	45	24	17	41	38	15	5	9	14	12
2009–10	Kloten Flyers	NLA	37	15	16	31	8	10	4	6	10	8
2010–11	Binghamton Senators	AHL	70	20	22	42	28	21	4	5	9	6
2010–11	Ottawa Senators	NHL	7	0	0	0	0	—	—	—	—	—
2011–12	Kloten Flyers	NLA	34	11	10	21	18	5	1	1	2	4
2012–13	ZSC Lions	NLA	42	15	22	37	22	12	5	5	10	8
2013–14	ZSC Lions	NLA	47	23	25	48	58	18	3	6	9	20
2014–15	ZSC Lions	NLA	49	16	25	41	36	18	6	9	15	22
2015–16	ZSC Lions	NLA	38	11	14	25	12	4	0	0	0	4
2016–17	ZSC Lions	NLA	43	20	19	39	20	6	1	2	3	6
2017–18	ZSC Lions	NL	47	20	12	32	32	18	2	6	8	20
2018–19	ZSC Lions	NL	18	3	8	11	14	—	—	—	—	—
2019–20	ZSC Lions	NL	40	4	14	18	14	—	—	—	—	—
2020–21	ZSC Lions	NL	47	1	6	7	14	9	1	1	2	14
NLA/NL totals			610	189	215	384	358	131	30	48	78	122
NHL totals			7	0	0	0	0	—	—	—	—	—

=== International ===
Year	Team	Event	Result	GP	G	A	Pts	PIM
2003	Switzerland	WJC18	9th	6	4	0	4	2
2005	Switzerland	WJC	8th	6	1	3	4	0
2008	Switzerland	WC	7th	3	1	1	2	2
2009	Switzerland	WC	9th	6	2	2	4	2
2010	Switzerland	OG	8th	5	2	3	5	2
2012	Switzerland	WC	11th	7	1	1	2	0
2014	Switzerland	OG	9th	4	0	0	0	6
Junior totals				12	5	3	8	2
Senior totals				25	6	7	13	12

== Achievements and awards ==
- 2002 — Topscorer in the Elite Junior League
- 2003 — Topscorer in the Elite Junior League
- 2014 — MVP Most Valuable Player, National League A
