= Thomas Heinimann =

Swiss ice hockey player

- Heinimann (number 79) in 2016
- Born: April 2, 1996 (age 30) Geneva, Switzerland
- Height: 5 ft 9 in (175 cm)
- Weight: 170 lb (77 kg; 12 st 2 lb)
- Position: Left winger
- Shoots: Left
- SL team Former teams: HC Sierre; Genève-Servette HC
- Playing career: 2015–present

Thomas Heinimann (born 2 April 1996) is a Swiss professional ice hockey left winger who is currently playing with HC Sierre of the Swiss League (SL). He previously played in the National League (NL) with Genève-Servette HC.

== Playing career ==
Heinimann made his National League debut with Genève-Servette HC in the 2015-16 season, appearing in 7 games this season.

On May 26, 2016, Heinimann signed his first professional contract, agreeing to a two-year deal with Genève-Servette HC.

On August 17, 2018, Heinimann was signed to a two-year contract extension by Genève-Servette HC. He spent the majority of his contract on loan with HC Sierre as he was limited to 11 games with Servette over 2 seasons.

On April 21, 2020, Heinimann officially left Genève-Servette HC by agreeing to a one-year contract with HC Sierre of the Swiss League.

== International play ==
Heinimann appeared in a few exhibition games with Switzerland men's national junior team.
