= Dennis Saikkonen =

Swiss-Finnish ice hockey player

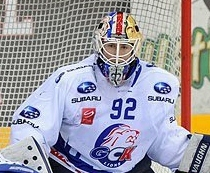
- Born: 27 November 1992 (age 33) Bern, Switzerland
- Height: 6 ft 0 in (183 cm)
- Weight: 174 lb (79 kg; 12 st 6 lb)
- Position: Goaltender
- Caught: Left
- Played for: JYP Jyväskylä; HC Ambrì-Piotta; HC Fribourg-Gottéron; EHC Kloten; EHC Biel; Rødovre Mighty Bulls
- NHL draft: Undrafted
- Playing career: 2010–2022

Dennis Saikkonen (born 27 November 1992) is a Swiss-Finnish former professional ice hockey Goaltender who played his career mostly in Finnish and Swiss leagues. He most recently played with the Rødovre Mighty Bulls of the Metal Ligaen (DEN).

== Early life ==
Saikkonen was born in Switzerland to a Finnish mother from Jyväskylä and a Swedish father. He holds Finnish, Swedish and Swiss citizenships.

== Playing career ==
Saikkonen began playing junior hockey with the SC Bern system in 2002–03. By 2007–08, he worked his way up to the Junior Elite A level as a starting goaltender and becoming Swiss Junior B Champion season 2008-09.

Saikkonen was selected in the second round of the 2010 CHL Import Draft (83rd overall) by the Brampton Battalion of the Ontario Hockey League (OHL) as first goaltender ever in SC Bern's history and fifth Swiss goaltender all time. He joined the Brampton Battalion for the 2010-11 OHL season. Saikkonen made his OHL debut on 30 September 2010 by beating Erie Otters 9-3. Saikkonen played 13 regular season games for Brampton Battalion.

In 2011-12, Saikkonen played 7 NLB games with HC Sierre and had a record of 4-0-3 and GAA 3.38, 7 games as back-up goaltender in NLA with SC Bern and 16 games with Elite A Juniors with GAA 1.46 and a 92% save percentage.

In 2012-13, Saikkonen played 12 NLB games with the GCK Lions and was back-up goalie with ZSC Lions in 9 NLA games. Saikkonen played also two games for HC Thurgau, 2.38 GAA .

From 2013 to 2016, Dennis Saikkonen played within the JYP Jyväskylä organisation in Finland. Thanks to his excellent season with development team JYP-Akatemia, 94.3 save % and 1.81 GAA, he was recalled in February 2014 to JYP Jyväskylä for the play-offs and made his Liiga debut on the highest level in Finland on 31 March 2014 the most spectacular way . He replaced JYP Jyväskylä's Sami Rajaniemi in game 7 against SaiPa in the second period when the game was 4-3. JYP lost the game 6-4 (last goal empty net) and Saikkonen booked 10 saves and with a save % of 90.9.

In 2014-15, Saikkonen was the third goalie in JYP Jyväskylä Jyväskylä and has played 7 games for JYP's farmer team JYP-Akatemia with save 91.24% and 2.68 GAA.

He penned a deal with Fribourg-Gottéron of the Swiss National League A (NLA) in April 2016 and in March 2017 moved on to fellow NLA side EHC Kloten.

== International play ==
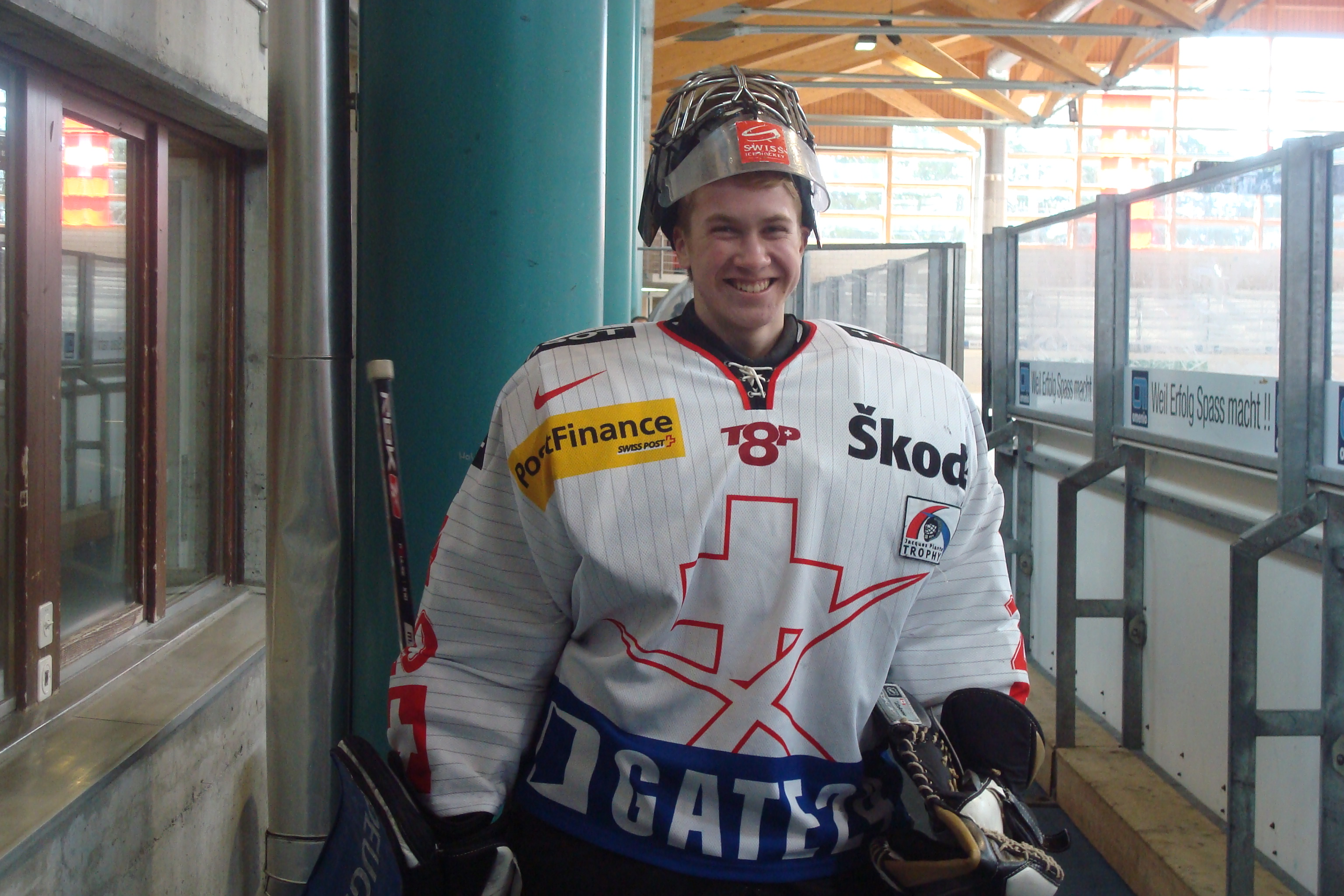
Dennis Saikkonen as part of the Swiss National team.

Saikkonen has been a part of 46 international games with Switzerland's junior national team. Touted for his hockey intelligence, good reflexes and athleticism, Saikkonen was selected to represent Switzerland at the 2010 World Under-18 Championships in Minsk, Belarus and becoming fifth (5) with his team.

== Career statistics ==
| Season | Team | League | GP | W | L | T | MIN | GA | SO | GAA | Sv% |
|---|---|---|---|---|---|---|---|---|---|---|---|
| 2011–12 | Sierre | NLB | 14 | 4 | 3 | – | 439 | | | 3.38 |
| 2011–12 | SC Bern | NLA | 7 | – | – | – | – | – | – | – | – |
| 2011–12 | SC Bern | Elite A | 16 | 14 | 2 | – | 1070 | | | 1.46 | .920 |

== Achievements ==
Swiss Champion Junior B Season 2008-09.
