= GDT Bellinzona Snakes =

- City: Bellinzona, Switzerland
- League: Swiss League
- Founded: 1987
- Home arena: Centro Sportivo di Bellinzona
- Colors: Red, Black, White
- General manager: Sébastien Reuille
- Head coach: Alex Reinhard
- Affiliates: HC Ambrì-Piotta; HC Lugano
- Website: tirockets.ch

Franchise history
- 1987–2005: HC Iragna
- 2005–2007: HC Iragna 3 Valli
- 2007–2016: HC Biasca 3 Valli
- 2016–2019: HCB Ticino Rockets
- 2019–2024: Bellinzona Rockets
- 2024–present: GDT Bellinzona Snakes

The GDT Bellinzona Snakes are a professional ice hockey team based in Bellinzona, Switzerland.

The club was founded as HC Iragna in Iragna in 1987. In 2007 the club was moved to Biasca of the Riviera, where in 2016 they became a professional side named HCB Ticino Rockets, before moving again to Bellinzona and changing their name twice more.

They have played since the 2016–17 season in the Swiss League, the second tier of the main professional ice hockey league in Switzerland, behind the National League.

Former club crest under the HCB Ticino Rockets name when the club was based in Biasca

== History ==
The club was originally founded in 1987 as HC Iragna. Later it was renamed HC Biasca 3 Valli. Since 1992, the franchise has played in the Pista di ghiaccio di Biasca, which was renamed in 2016 Raiffeisen BiascArena.

After winning the Swiss Regio league in 2016, HC Biasca submitted an application to play in the National League B. After approval, the club was renamed the HCB Ticino Rockets, with the purpose to serve as an affiliate club to shareholders and National League clubs' HC Ambrì-Piotta and HC Lugano.

== Honors ==
Swiss Regio League: (1) 2016
