= Denis Malgin =

Swiss ice hockey player (born 1997)

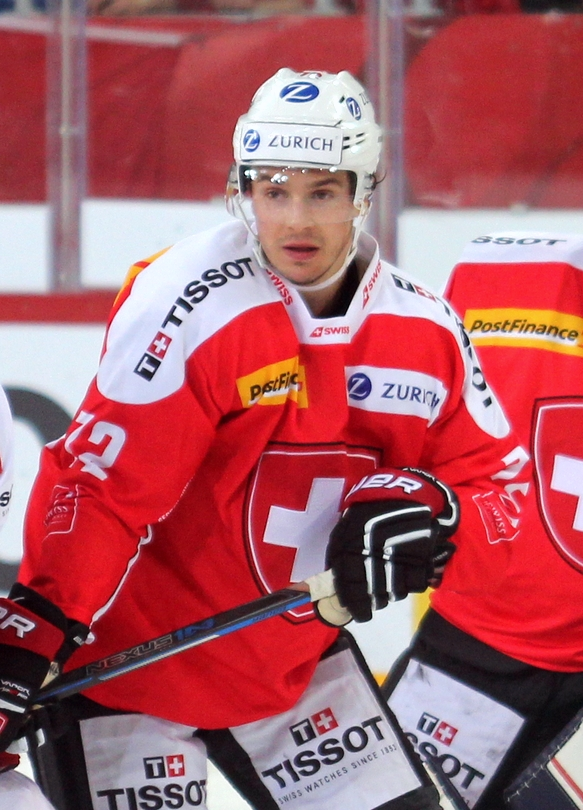
- Malgin in 2017
- Born: 18 January 1997 (age 29) Olten, Switzerland
- Height: 1.75 m (5 ft 9 in)
- Weight: 81 kg (179 lb; 12 st 11 lb)
- Position: Centre
- Shoots: Right
- NL team Former teams: ZSC Lions; Florida Panthers; Toronto Maple Leafs; Lausanne HC; Colorado Avalanche
- National team: Switzerland
- NHL draft: 102nd overall, 2015; Florida Panthers
- Playing career: 2013–present

Denis Malgin (born 18 January 1997) is a Swiss professional ice hockey player who is a centre for the ZSC Lions of the National League (NL). Malgin was selected by the Florida Panthers in the fourth round, 102nd overall, of the 2015 NHL entry draft.

== Playing career ==
Malgin made his National League A debut playing with ZSC Lions during the 2014–15 season. He was selected in the fourth round (102nd overall) in the 2015 NHL entry draft by the Florida Panthers.

On 25 July 2016, Malgin signed a three-year, entry-level contract with the Panthers.

Malgin made the Panthers' opening night roster for the 2016–17 season. He made his NHL debut on 13 October against the New Jersey Devils. His first career point, an assist, came in his second NHL game, against the Detroit Red Wings on 15 October. He scored his first NHL goal on 2 November against Tuukka Rask of the Boston Bruins. Malgin finished the season with ten points in 47 games. He also skated in 15 games for the Panthers' American Hockey League (AHL) affiliate, the Springfield Thunderbirds.

Malgin spent the entirety of the 2018–19 season with the Panthers, recording 16 points in 50 games. On 26 August 2019, the Panthers re-signed Malgin to a one-year contract extension.

During the 2019–20 season, Malgin registered 12 points in 36 games with the Panthers before he was traded to the Toronto Maple Leafs in exchange for forward Mason Marchment on 19 February 2020.

On 2 October 2020, Toronto re-signed Malgin to a one-year contract extension worth $700000. He began the 2020–21 NL season with Lausanne HC on loan from the Leafs while the start of the North American was delayed due to the ongoing pandemic. Malgin was placed on waivers by the Leafs on 5 January 2021 in order to continue with Lausanne for the remainder of the season. On 2 May, Malgin was re-assigned to the Toronto Marlies of the AHL.

On 6 September 2021, Malgin returned to the ZSC Lions as a free agent, agreeing to a four-year deal.

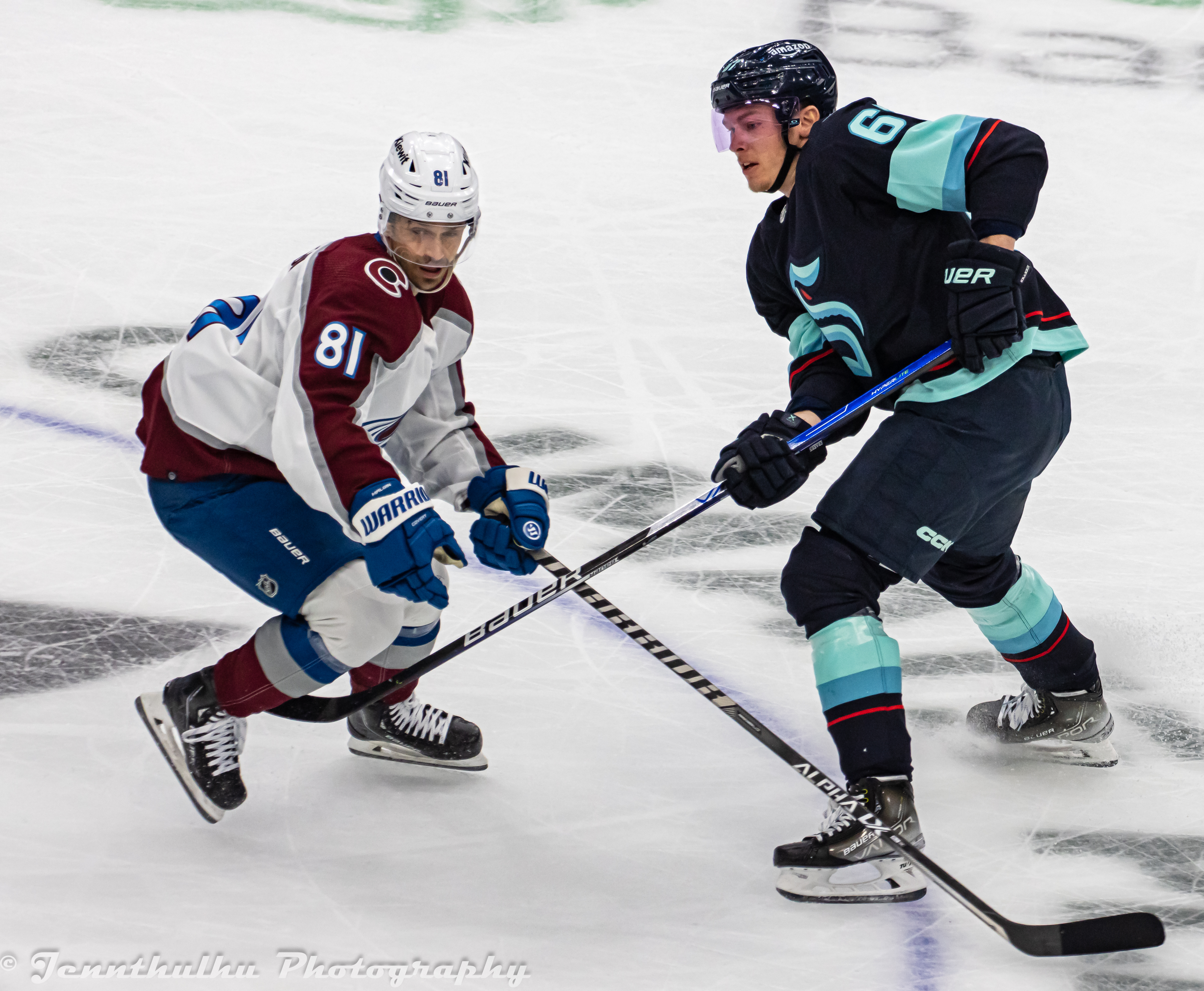
Malgin (left) with the Colorado Avalanche during the 2023 Stanley Cup playoffs.

On 13 July 2022, Malgin returned to the NHL, signing a one-year, $750000 contract with the Toronto Maple Leafs. After a successful training camp and productive pre-season, finishing as one of the team's offensive leaders, Malgin made the Maple Leafs opening night roster to begin the 2022–23 season. Malgin collected 4 points through 23 games before his tenure with the Maple Leafs ended as he was traded to the Colorado Avalanche in exchange for Dryden Hunt on 19 December 2022. He made his Avalanche debut, initially featuring on the third-line, in a 2-1 overtime victory over the Montreal Canadiens on 21 December 2022.

As a pending restricted free agent with arbitration rights and with the Avalanche facing salary cap constraints, Malgin was not tendered a qualifying offer by the club and was released as a free agent. Unsatisfied with the NHL interest at the opening of free agency, Malgin opted to return Switzerland and sign a five-year contract with his original club, ZSC Lions, on 18 July 2023.

In the 2023–24 season, Malgin emerged as a top-line offensive threat with the Lions and led the team in scoring with 47 points through 48 regular season games. In the post-season, he continued to lead ZSC's attack in posting 14 points in 15 playoff appearances. During the Championship clinching game for ZSC, Malgin sustained a knee injury, which would later rule him out of the following 2024 IIHF World Championship.

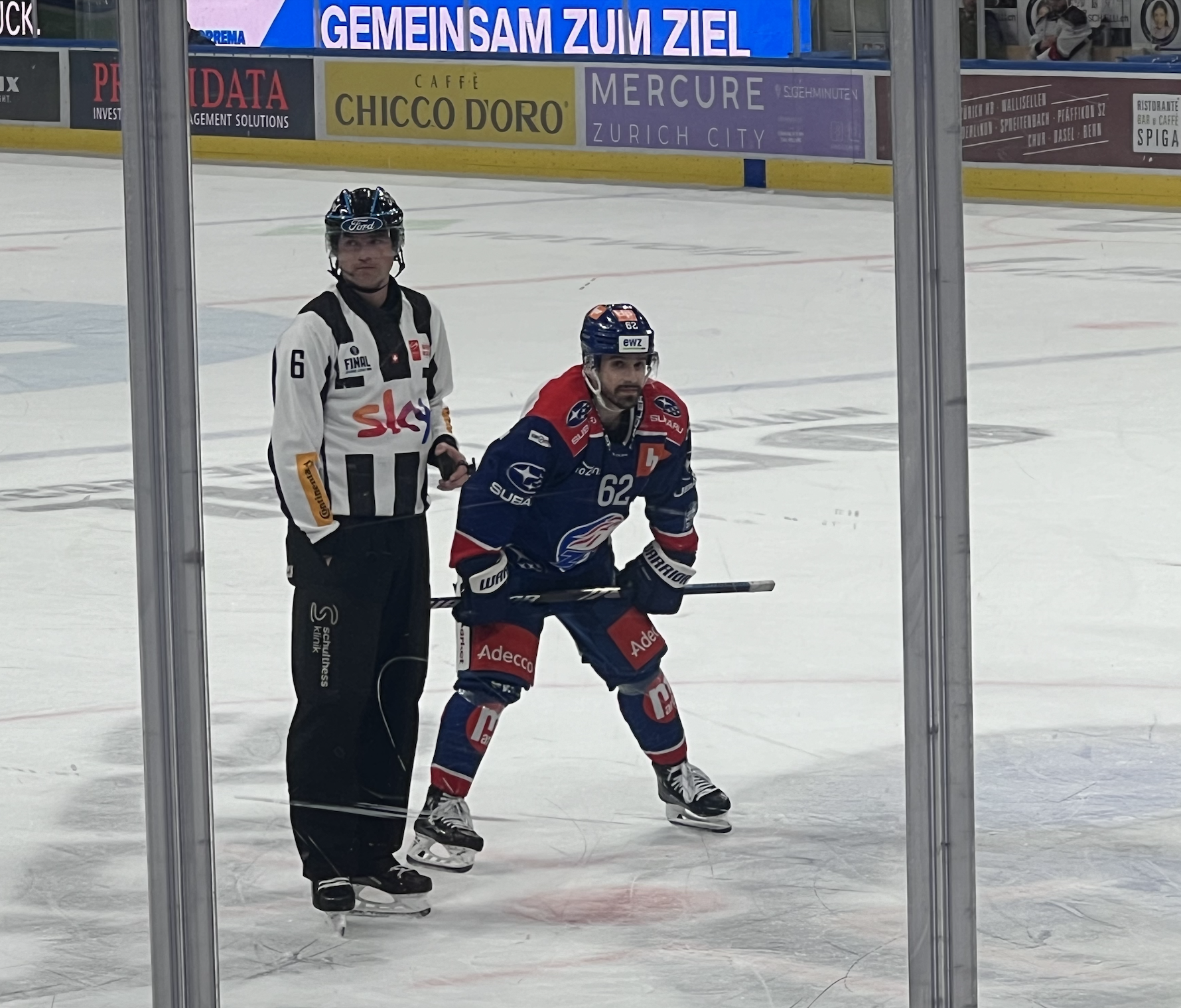
Malgin playing for Zurich during the 2024 National League Final against Lausanne.

== International play ==
Medal record

Representing Switzerland

Ice hockey

World Championships
Silver medal – second place	2025 Sweden/Denmark	
Silver medal – second place	2026 Switzerland	

Malgin competed for Switzerland at the 2015 IIHF World U18 Championships, where he was named to the 2015 IIHF World U18 Championship All-Star Team.

== Personal life ==
Malgin's parents are originally from Russia. His father Albert played for teams in the Soviet Union before moving to Switzerland to continue his career. It was he who introduced Malgin to ice hockey; at age three, Malgin began skating with his father's team. Malgin's brother Dmitri is also a professional ice hockey player, playing in the 1ère Ligue, the fourth-tier league in Switzerland.

Growing up, Malgin returned to Perm, Russia, every summer, where his father is from. He grew up speaking Russian, though he learned Swiss German at school.

== Career statistics ==
=== Regular season and playoffs ===
			Regular season					Playoffs
Season	Team	League	GP	G	A	Pts	PIM	GP	G	A	Pts	PIM
2012–13	ZSC Lions	SUI U17	7	6	10	16	16	5	4	5	9	4
2012–13	GCK Lions	SUI U20	25	15	11	26	14	3	1	1	2	2
2013–14	GCK Lions	NLB	38	6	13	19	14	—	—	—	—	—
2013–14	GCK Lions	SUI U20	—	—	—	—	—	7	5	1	6	8
2014–15	GCK Lions	NLB	24	6	6	12	4	—	—	—	—	—
2014–15	ZSC Lions	NLA	23	2	6	8	8	18	4	2	6	4
2014–15	GCK Lions	SUI U20	—	—	—	—	—	5	1	8	9	4
2015–16	GCK Lions	SUI U20	1	0	1	1	0	2	1	1	2	0
2015–16	GCK Lions	NLB	7	2	3	5	0	—	—	—	—	—
2015–16	ZSC Lions	NLA	38	5	12	17	12	3	0	0	0	0
2016–17	Florida Panthers	NHL	47	6	4	10	8	—	—	—	—	—
2016–17	Springfield Thunderbirds	AHL	15	3	9	12	14	—	—	—	—	—
2017–18	Springfield Thunderbirds	AHL	13	4	10	14	0	—	—	—	—	—
2017–18	Florida Panthers	NHL	51	11	11	22	6	—	—	—	—	—
2018–19	Florida Panthers	NHL	50	7	9	16	14	—	—	—	—	—
2019–20	Florida Panthers	NHL	36	4	8	12	12	—	—	—	—	—
2019–20	Toronto Maple Leafs	NHL	8	0	0	0	2	—	—	—	—	—
2020–21	Lausanne HC	NL	45	19	23	42	56	4	2	1	3	6
2021–22	ZSC Lions	NL	48	21	31	52	49	17	9	9	18	2
2022–23	Toronto Maple Leafs	NHL	23	2	2	4	4	—	—	—	—	—
2022–23	Colorado Avalanche	NHL	42	11	6	17	4	7	0	0	0	2
2023–24	ZSC Lions	NL	48	18	29	47	26	15	6	8	14	4
2024–25	ZSC Lions	NL	39	13	23	36	24	16	7	13	20	2
2025–26	ZSC Lions	NL	41	14	27	41	26	9	3	6	9	4
NL totals			282	92	151	243	201	82	31	39	70	22
NHL totals			257	41	40	81	50	7	0	0	0	2

=== International ===
Year	Team	Event	Result	GP	G	A	Pts	PIM
2013	Switzerland	U18	6th	5	2	2	4	4
2013	Switzerland	IH18	6th	4	1	2	3	2
2014	Switzerland	U18	7th	5	3	4	7	2
2015	Switzerland	WJC	9th	6	1	6	7	0
2015	Switzerland	U18	4th	7	3	2	5	2
2016	Switzerland	WJC	9th	6	1	8	9	6
2017	Switzerland	WC	6th	7	0	0	0	2
2022	Switzerland	OG	8th	3	1	0	1	4
2022	Switzerland	WC	5th	8	5	7	12	4
2023	Switzerland	WC	5th	6	2	4	6	4
2025	Switzerland	WC	2nd place, silver medalist(s)	9	1	10	11	6
2026	Switzerland	OG	5th	2	0	0	0	2
2026	Switzerland	WC	2nd place, silver medalist(s)	10	5	8	13	2
Junior totals				33	11	24	35	16
Senior totals				45	14	29	43	24

== Awards and honors ==
Award	Year
NL
Youngster of the Year	2015
Media Swiss All-Star Team	2021
Media All-Star Team	2022
Champion (ZSC Lions)	2024
International
World U18 Championships All-Star Team	2015
