= Dave Sutter =

Swiss ice hockey player

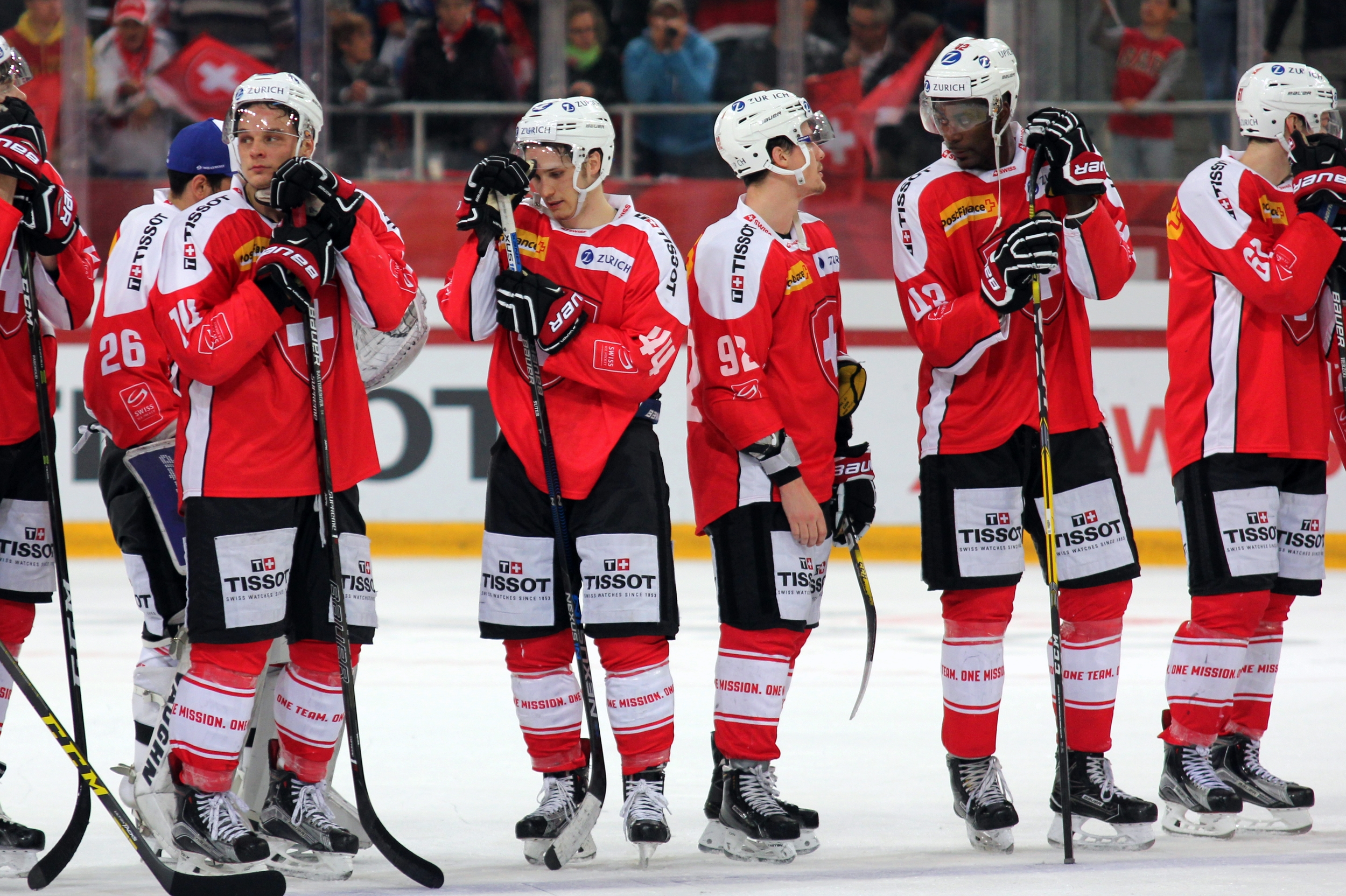
- Born: 21 February 1992 (age 34) Douala, Cameroon
- Height: 6 ft 4 in (193 cm)
- Weight: 212 lb (96 kg; 15 st 2 lb)
- Position: Defence
- Shoots: Right
- NL team Former teams: Genève-Servette HC; EHC Biel; ZSC Lions; HC Fribourg-Gottéron
- NHL draft: Undrafted
- Playing career: 2013–present

Dave Raoul Ntamak, known professionally as Dave Sutter (born February 21, 1992) is a Swiss professional ice hockey defenseman, currently playing for Genève-Servette HC in the National League (NL).

== Playing career ==
Sutter was born in Douala, Cameroon as Dave Raoul Ntamak, spending the first four years of his life in the country before moving to Switzerland with his mother. He adopted the surname Sutter professionally, as a way to honor his stepfather who introduced him to the sport of ice hockey at the age of nine.

== Career statistics ==
=== Regular season and playoffs ===
			Regular season					Playoffs
Season	Team	League	GP	G	A	Pts	PIM	GP	G	A	Pts	PIM
2006–07	HC Monthey-Chablais	Swiss 1. Liga	3	0	0	0	0	2	0	0	0	0
2007–08	Genève-Servette HC	Swiss 1. Liga	41	5	14	19	6	6	0	0	0	2
2008–09	Genève-Servette HC	Elite Jr. A	5	0	1	1	0	—	—	—	—	—
2009–10	Genève-Servette HC	Elite Jr. A	37	6	14	20	26	3	0	0	0	0
2010–11	Seattle Thunderbirds	WHL	71	1	10	11	65	—	—	—	—	—
2011–12	Seattle Thunderbirds	WHL	66	5	14	19	40	—	—	—	—	—
2012–13	Genève-Servette HC	NLA	3	0	0	0	2	—	—	—	—	—
2012–13	HC Red Ice	NLB	43	3	9	12	39	6	0	2	2	6
2013–14	HC Red Ice	NLB	45	3	11	14	43	4	0	0	0	2
2014–15	HC La Chaux-de-Fonds	NLB	44	5	7	12	6	7	3	1	4	2
2014–15	HC Fribourg-Gottéron	NLA	2	0	0	0	0	—	—	—	—	—
2015–16	EHC Biel	NLA	50	4	8	12	8	—	—	—	—	—
2016–17	EHC Biel	NLA	50	2	15	17	12	5	0	2	2	27
2017–18	ZSC Lions	NL	43	0	13	13	8	18	1	5	6	4
2018–19	ZSC Lions	NL	34	1	4	5	10	—	—	—	—
2019–20	ZSC Lions	NL	32	0	1	1	16	—	—	—	—	—
2020–21	HC Fribourg-Gottéron	NL	51	1	3	4	24	5	1	0	1	2
2021–22	HC Fribourg-Gottéron	NL	49	2	10	12	49	9	0	4	4	2
2022–23	HC Fribourg-Gottéron	NL	51	1	4	5	8	2	0	0	0	0
2023–24	HC Fribourg-Gottéron	NL	19	0	2	2	6	10	0	0	0	4
2024–25	HC Fribourg-Gottéron	NL	47	3	2	5	8	14	1	4	5	6
NL totals			431	14	62	76	141	63	3	15	18	45

=== International ===
Year	Team	Event	Result	GP	G	A	Pts	PIM
2010	Switzerland	U18	5th	6	0	2	2	2
2012	Switzerland	WJC	8th	6	0	0	0	4
Junior totals				12	0	2	2	6
