= Jonas Siegenthaler =

Swiss ice hockey player (born 1997)

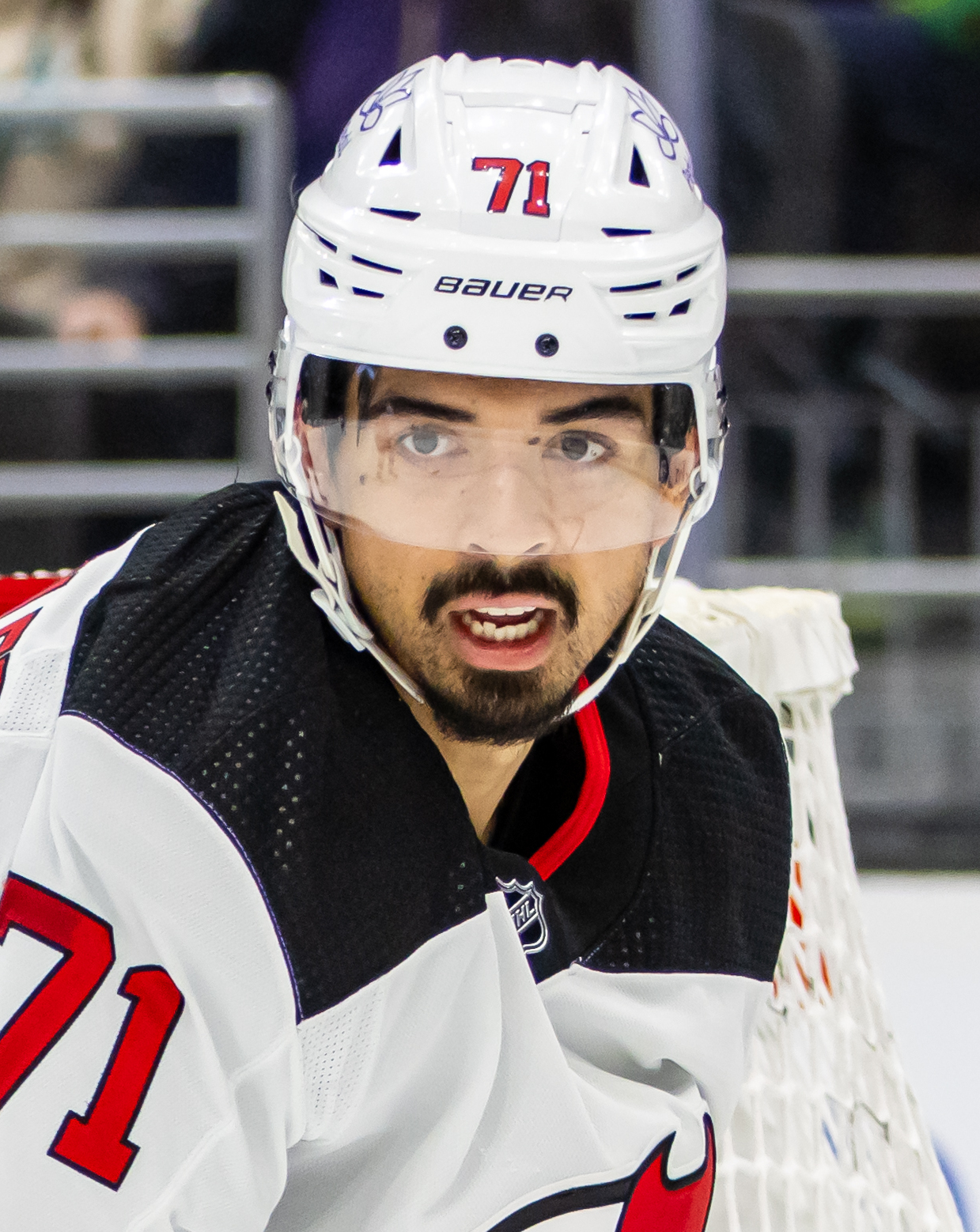
- Siegenthaler with the New Jersey Devils in 2023
- Born: 6 May 1997 (age 29) Zurich, Switzerland
- Height: 6 ft 2 in (188 cm)
- Weight: 218 lb (99 kg; 15 st 8 lb)
- Position: Defence
- Shoots: Left
- NHL team Former teams: New Jersey Devils; ZSC Lions; Washington Capitals
- National team: Switzerland
- NHL draft: 57th overall, 2015; Washington Capitals
- Playing career: 2013–present

Jonas Siegenthaler (born 6 May 1997) is a Swiss professional ice hockey player who is a defenceman for the New Jersey Devils of the National Hockey League (NHL).

== Playing career ==
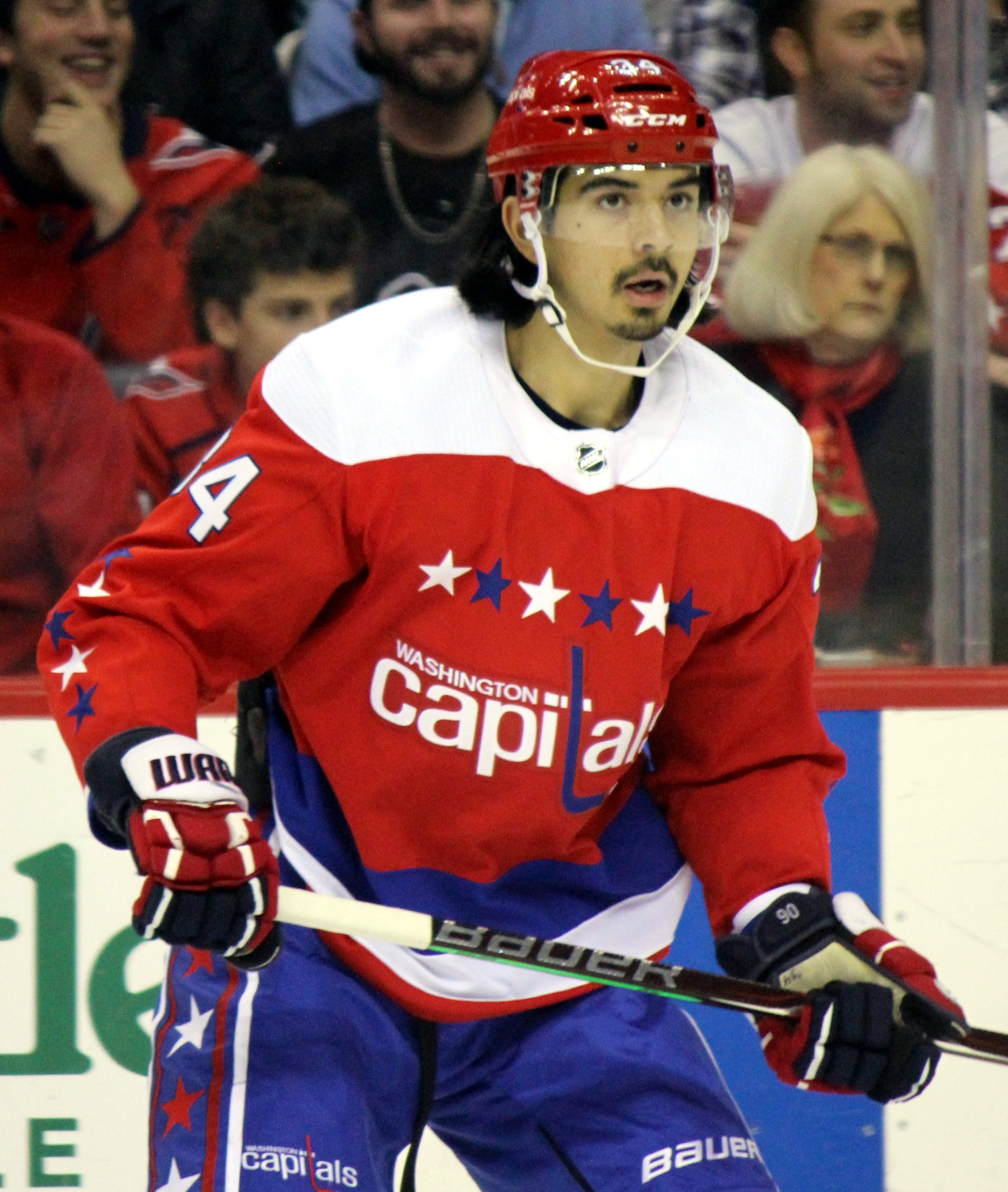
Siegenthaler with the Washington Capitals in 2018

Siegenthaler made his National League A debut playing with ZSC Lions during the 2013–14 season. He was rated as a top prospect, projected as a possible first round selection in the 2015 NHL entry draft, and was selected 57th overall by the Washington Capitals.

On 30 July 2015, Siegenthaler was signed to a three-year entry-level contract with the Capitals. Siegenthaler remained with the ZSC Lions on loan for the 2015–16 season in order to further develop. In 40 games with the Lions, Siegenthaler contributed 8 points from the blueline before the team suffered a first-round defeat in the postseason. On 16 March 2016, with the Lions season and his loan period at an end, he was reassigned to the Capitals AHL affiliate, the Hershey Bears.

He also spent the 2016–17 season with the ZSC Lions. After being knocked out with the Lions in the NLA quarterfinals, he returned to the Hershey Bears in mid-March 2017.

The Capitals recalled Siegenthaler from Hershey on 8 November 2018, to play against the Columbus Blue Jackets the next night at home in his first NHL game. Veteran Capitals defencemen Brooks Orpik (injured reserve) and John Carlson (day-to-day) were both unavailable to play. Siegenthaler scored his first NHL point on 14 December 2018 in a 6–5 win over the Carolina Hurricanes, gaining the primary assist on a goal by Alexander Ovechkin.

During the 2020–21 season, while approaching the NHL trade deadline, Siegenthaler was traded by the Capitals to the New Jersey Devils in exchange for a conditional third-round pick in the 2021 NHL entry draft on 11 April 2021. On 9 July 2021, Siegenthaler signed a two-year, $2.25 million contract extension to remain with the Devils. On 26 July 2022, the Devils and Siegenthaler agreed to a five-year, $17 million contract extension.

On 6 January 2024, Siegenthaler suffered a broken foot while blocking a shot against the Vancouver Canucks. Siegenthaler was removed from the injured reserve on 20 February. On 11 March, he was elbowed by New York Rangers forward Matt Rempe, causing him to leave the game early. Rempe was suspended four games for the hit. On 13 March, it was announced that he was diagnosed with a concussion and will be out for an extended period of time.

== Personal life ==
Siegenthaler's father is from Switzerland, while his mother is from Thailand. He is the first known NHL player of Thai descent.

== International play ==
Medal record

Men's ice hockey

Representing Switzerland

World Championships
Silver medal – second place	2024 Czech Republic	
Silver medal – second place	2025 Sweden/Denmark	

Siegenthaler competed with Switzerland under-18 team at the IIHF World U18 Championships in 2013, 2014 and 2015. His outstanding play was recognized when he was named to the 2015 U18 WJC All-Star Team. He was also selected to participate at the 2014 Ivan Hlinka Memorial Tournament.

He was chosen to skate, as a 17-year-old, with the Swiss junior squad at the 2015 World Junior Championships.

Siegenthaler played his last WJC for Switzerland in 2017 where he tallied six points in five games and was Switzerland's most used player with over 25 minutes of ice-time per game.

He represented Switzerland at the 2024 IIHF World Championship and won a silver medal.

== Career statistics ==
=== Regular season and playoffs ===
			Regular season					Playoffs
Season	Team	League	GP	G	A	Pts	PIM	GP	G	A	Pts	PIM
2013–14	GCK Lions	NLB	40	2	6	8	24	—	—	—	—	—
2013–14	ZSC Lions	NLA	6	0	0	0	2	—	—	—	—	—
2014–15	GCK Lions	NLB	10	1	7	8	10	—	—	—	—	—
2014–15	ZSC Lions	NLA	41	0	3	3	39	18	0	2	2	4
2015–16	ZSC Lions	NLA	40	3	5	8	28	4	0	0	0	2
2015–16	Hershey Bears	AHL	6	0	1	1	8	—	—	—	—	—
2016–17	ZSC Lions	NLA	28	1	6	7	16	6	0	0	0	8
2016–17	Hershey Bears	AHL	7	0	0	0	2	5	0	0	0	2
2017–18	Hershey Bears	AHL	75	6	6	12	61	—	—	—	—	—
2018–19	Hershey Bears	AHL	34	2	4	6	30	—	—	—	—	—
2018–19	Washington Capitals	NHL	26	0	4	4	10	4	0	0	0	2
2019–20	Washington Capitals	NHL	64	2	7	9	43	7	0	0	0	0
2020–21	Washington Capitals	NHL	7	0	0	0	2	—	—	—	—	—
2020–21	New Jersey Devils	NHL	8	0	0	0	2	—	—	—	—	—
2021–22	New Jersey Devils	NHL	70	1	13	14	42	—	—	—	—	—
2022–23	New Jersey Devils	NHL	80	4	17	21	44	11	1	2	3	8
2023–24	New Jersey Devils	NHL	57	1	8	9	20	—	—	—	—	—
2024–25	New Jersey Devils	NHL	55	2	7	9	44	3	0	0	0	6
2025–26	New Jersey Devils	NHL	82	0	16	16	48	—	—	—	—	—
NLA totals			115	4	14	18	85	28	0	2	2	14
NHL totals			449	10	72	82	255	25	1	2	3	16

=== International ===
Year	Team	Event	Result	GP	G	A	Pts	PIM
2013	Switzerland	U18	6th	5	0	0	0	8
2013	Switzerland	IH18	6th	4	0	0	0	2
2014	Switzerland	U18	7th	5	0	1	1	2
2015	Switzerland	U18	4th	7	0	4	4	20
2015	Switzerland	WJC	9th	6	0	1	1	8
2016	Switzerland	WJC	9th	6	0	1	1	6
2017	Switzerland	WJC	7th	5	1	5	6	2
2021	Switzerland	WC	6th	7	0	1	1	6
2022	Switzerland	WC	5th	8	1	4	5	4
2024	Switzerland	WC	2nd place, silver medalist(s)	9	0	4	4	4
2025	Switzerland	WC	2nd place, silver medalist(s)	9	1	3	4	6
2026	Switzerland	OG	5th	5	0	0	0	4
Junior totals				38	1	12	13	48
Senior totals				38	2	12	14	24

== Awards and honours ==
Award	Year	Ref
International
WJC18 All-Star Team	2015	
