= Luca Zanatta =

Italian-Swiss ice hockey player

- Born: 15 May 1991 (age 35) Pieve di Cadore, Italy
- Height: 6 ft 1 in (185 cm)
- Weight: 198 lb (90 kg; 14 st 2 lb)
- Position: Defence
- Shoots: Left
- ICEHL team Former teams: HC Pustertal Wölfe; SG Cortina; Genève-Servette HC
- National team: Italy
- Playing career: 2008–present

Luca Elia Zanatta (born 31 May 1989) is an Italian-Swiss professional ice hockey player who is a defenceman for HC Pustertal Wölfe of the ICE Hockey League (ICEHL). He is also a member of the Italian national team.

== Playing career ==
He started in the juvenile hockey team HC Lugano, where his father has been assistant coach and suddenly coach of the first team.

After the sportive debut in the Swiss 1. Liga with the Hockey Club Ceresio, in 2009 he returned to Italy, where he enrolled the SG Cortina for five seasons, winning the 2011-2012 Italian Cup. In February 2012, he had an accident that obliged him to a period of medical rehabilitation.

For the years 2014-2015, he come back to Switzerland, where he and his brother Michael signed a contract with the HC Red Ice, playing in the Swiss League. The following season, because the Red Ice Martigny had lost the playoffs he was to the Genève-Servette HC, starting to play in the National League.

After the elimination of the Martigny during the playoffs, Zanatta signed a two-year contract with the EHC Olten.

== International play ==
In 2014, he started on playing with the Italian National Team. The next year, he participated at the 2015 First Division World Cup in Poland. In 2017, he participated to the IIHF World Championship.

== Career statistics ==
=== Regular season and playoffs ===
			Regular season					Playoffs
Season	Team	League	GP	G	A	Pts	PIM	GP	G	A	Pts	PIM
2005–06	HC Lugano U20	Elite Jr. A	1	1	0	1	0	—	—	—	—	—
2005–06	Cortina U19	Italy U19	0	0	0	0	0	2	0	0	0	8
2006–07	Notre Dame Hounds U18 AAA	SMAAAHL	33	2	8	10	24	8	0	2	2	2
2007–08	HC Lugano U17	Novizen Elite	2	0	0	0	16	—	—	—	—	—
2007–08	HC Lugano U20	Elite Jr. A	2	0	0	0	2	—	—	—	—	—
2008–09	HC Ceresio	SwissDiv1	1	0	0	0	0	—	—	—	—	—
2009–10	Cortina U20	Italy U20	5	0	0	0	2	1	2	1	3	0
2009–10	Cortina	Italy	36	0	3	3	14	—	—	—	—	—
2010–11	Cortina U20	Italy U20	3	0	2	2	12	3	1	2	3	2
2010–11	Cortina	Italy	32	1	3	4	12	—	—	—	—	—
2010–11	Pieve Di Cadore	Italy3	9	0	1	1	6	—	—	—	—	—
2011–12	Cortina	Italy	30	1	4	5	26	—	—	—	—	—
2012–13	Cortina	Italy	37	1	7	8	30	12	0	2	2	2
2013–14	Cortina	Italy	42	7	9	16	32	10	2	2	4	4
2014–15	Red Ice	NLB	40	4	18	22	26	11	2	2	4	26
2015–16	Red Ice	NLB	34	5	10	15	14	9	1	2	3	10
2015–16	Genève-Servette HC	NLA	0	0	0	0	0	1	0	0	0	0
2016–17	Red Ice	NLB	47	3	19	22	20	5	0	1	1	10
2017–18	EHC Olten	SL	42	0	9	9	28	16	1	2	3	12
2018–19	EHC Olten	SL	24	1	8	9	10	10	0	1	1	6
2018–19	EHC Basel	MSL	2	0	0	0	2	—	—	—	—	—
2019–20	Cortina	AlpsHL	23	4	21	25	14	—	—	—	—	—
2019–20	Cortina	Italy	3	0	0	0	0	—	—	—	—	—
2020–21	Cortina	AlpsHL	22	5	18	23	12	2	0	0	0	0
2020–21	Cortina	Italy	2	0	1	1	0	—	—	—	—	—
2021–22	Cortina	AlpsHL	31	4	24	28	20	7	2	2	4	8
2021–22	Cortina	Italy	3	0	2	2	0	—	—	—	—	—
2022–23	Cortina	AlpsHL	23	0	17	17	12	18	1	8	9	16
2022–23	Cortina	Italy	3	0	0	0	4	—	—	—	—	—
2023–24	Cortina	AlpsHL	17	3	11	14	4	15	1	7	8	12
2023–24	Cortina	Italy	5	1	2	3	4	—	—	—	—	—
2024–25	HC Pustertal	ICEHL	43	1	17	18	10	8	0	0	0	0
2025–26	HC Pustertal	ICEHL	45	4	10	14	12	13	1	3	4	2
AlpsHL totals			116	16	91	107	62	42	4	17	21	36
ICEHL totals			88	5	27	32	22	21	1	3	4	2

=== International ===
Year	Team	Event	GP	G	A	Pts	PIM
2015	Italy	WC (D1A)	5	0	0	0	0
2016	Italy	OGQ	3	0	1	1	0
2017	Italy	WC	7	0	0	0	2
2018	Italy	WC (D1A)	5	0	1	1	4
2019	Italy	WC	7	0	0	0	2
2025	Italy	WC (D1A)	5	2	1	3	0
2026	Italy	OG	4	0	0	0	0
2026	Italy	WC	7	0	0	0	4
Senior totals			43	2	3	5	12
