= Anton Gustafsson =

Swedish ice hockey player (born 1990)

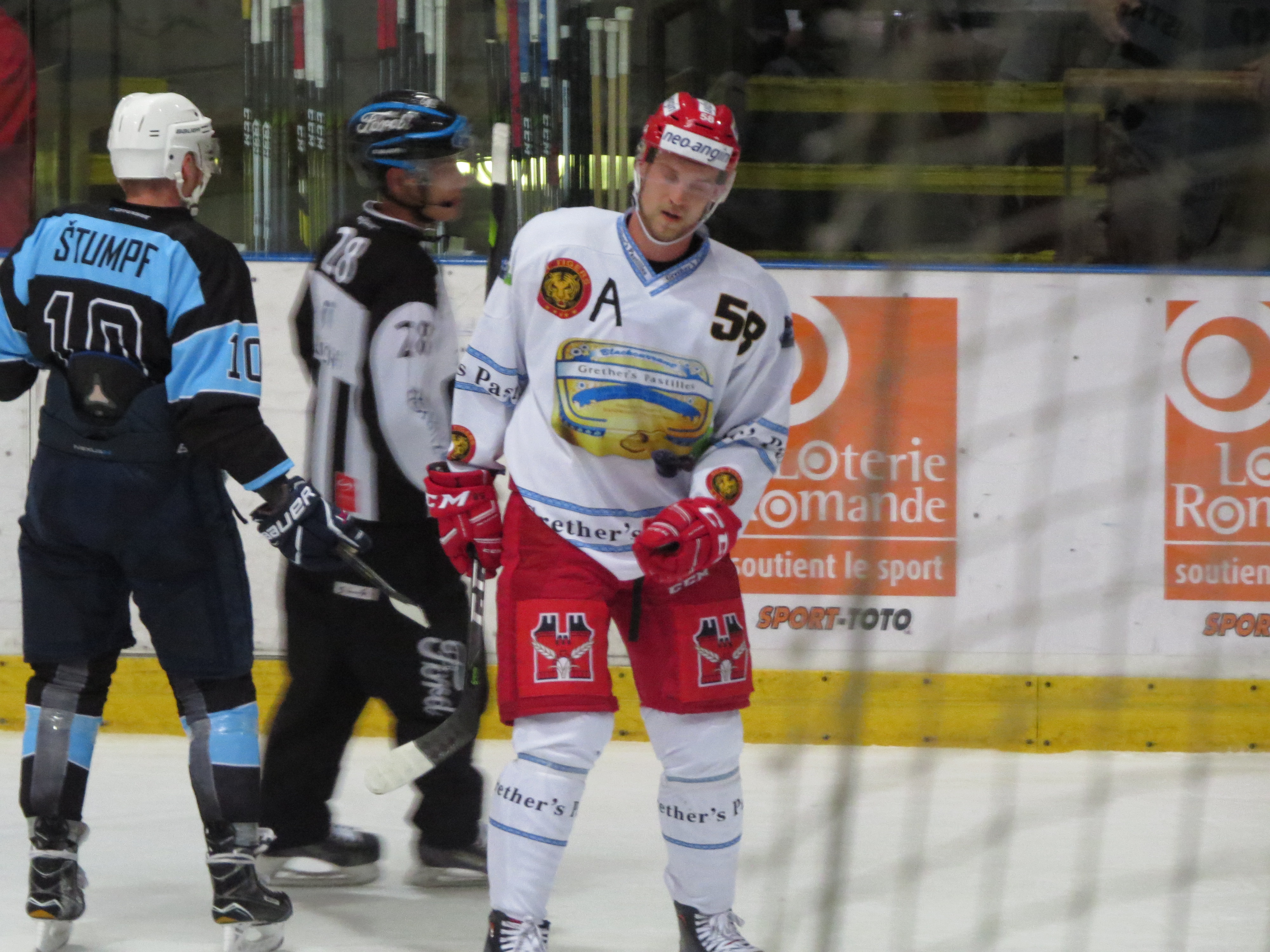
- Gustafsson with the SCL Tigers in 2017
- Born: February 25, 1990 (age 36) Karlskoga, Sweden
- Height: 6 ft 3 in (191 cm)
- Weight: 201 lb (91 kg; 14 st 5 lb)
- Position: Centre
- Shot: Left
- Played for: Frölunda HC; Hershey Bears; SCL Tigers; HC Fribourg-Gottéron; Färjestad BK; EHC Biel
- NHL draft: 21st overall, 2008; Washington Capitals
- Playing career: 2008–2022

Carl Anton Gustafsson (born February 25, 1990) is a Swedish former professional ice hockey centre. He is the son of IIHF Hall of Famer Bengt-Åke Gustafsson.

== Playing career ==
Born in Sweden, Gustafsson spent parts of his childhood in Feldkirch, Austria, and Langnau, Switzerland, where his father was playing and then coaching. He then moved back to Sweden where he developed into a top prospect, making his debut in the country's top-flight SHL with Frölunda HC during the 2007-08 season.

Gustafsson was selected in the first round, 21st overall, by the Washington Capitals in the 2008 NHL entry draft. Gustafsson was ranked fifth among European skaters by the NHL's Central Scouting Service. After being drafted by the Capitals in 2008, Gustafsson played the 2008–09 season with Bofors IK of the HockeyAllsvenskan. He then signed a three-year entry-level contract with the Capitals on May 15, 2009. The Capitals assigned him to their American Hockey League affiliate, the Hershey Bears, during the 2009–10 preseason, and on October 15, 2009, they loaned him to Borås HC for the remainder of the season in order to get him more playing time than was feasible in Hershey.

Gustafsson returned to North America for the 2010 season, but did not make the Capitals team or the Bears team. After spending training camp in Washington and Hershey, he was assigned to the South Carolina Stingrays, the ECHL affiliate of the Washington Capitals on October 9, 2010.

On October 18, 2010, after playing one game with the Stingrays, Gustafsson informed the Capitals that he no longer wished to continue his career in North America and returned to Europe. The Capitals immediately suspended his contract. He played for Swiss NLA outfit SCL Tigers in the 2010–11 and 2011-12 season, followed by one year at Asplöven HC in his native Sweden. Gustafsson then returned to the SCL Tigers for a second stint, playing under his father and helping the club win the 2015 NLB championship and move back to the NLA. Midway through the 2015-16 campaign, which he again spent with the SCL Tigers, Gustafsson inked a two-year deal with fellow NLA side HC Fribourg-Gottéron, starting with the 2016-17 season. He parted company with Fribourg-Gottéron in December 2016 for personal reasons and signed with Färjestad BK of the Swedish Hockey League shortly after leaving Switzerland.

At the conclusion of the 2016–17 season, Gustafsson moved back to Switzerland for a second stint with NLA side SCL Tigers, signing a two-year deal in April 2017.

Following his fifteenth professional season, Gustafsson announced his retirement from hockey on 26 August 2022.

== Personal ==
Gustafsson is the son of former National Hockey League player and former Swedish national team head coach Bengt-Åke Gustafsson.

== Career statistics ==
			Regular season					Playoffs
Season	Team	League	GP	G	A	Pts	PIM	GP	G	A	Pts	PIM
2005–06	Karlskoga HC	SWE.4		3	0	3		—	—	—	—	—
2006–07	Frölunda HC	J18	4	1	1	2	6	—	—	—	—	—
2006–07	Frölunda HC	J18 Allsv	4	2	3	5	2	6	3	1	4	2
2006–07	Frölunda HC	J20	26	5	3	8	24	8	0	0	0	8
2007–08	Frölunda HC	J18 Allsv	1	0	1	1	2	—	—	—	—	—
2007–08	Frölunda HC	J20	33	15	17	32	55	2	1	0	1	2
2007–08	Frölunda HC	SEL	1	0	0	0	0	—	—	—	—	—
2008–09	Frölunda HC	J20	2	0	0	0	4	5	3	4	7	4
2008–09	Bofors IK	Allsv	25	6	4	10	22	—	—	—	—	—
2009–10	Hershey Bears	AHL	1	0	2	2	0	—	—	—	—	—
2009–10	Borås HC	Allsv	34	6	12	18	20	—	—	—	—	—
2010–11	SCL Tigers	NLA	11	0	1	1	2	1	0	0	0	0
2011–12	SCL Tigers	NLA	26	3	3	6	10	—	—	—	—	—
2012–13	Asplöven HC	Allsv	41	8	13	21	8	—	—	—	—	—
2013–14	SCL Tigers	NLB	18	0	8	8	10	11	2	4	6	4
2014–15	SCL Tigers	NLB	13	2	8	10	4	17	16	4	20	4
2015–16	SCL Tigers	NLA	43	11	15	26	14	—	—	—	—	—
2016–17	HC Fribourg–Gottéron	NLA	24	2	3	5	4	—	—	—	—	—
2016–17	Färjestad BK	SHL	18	0	0	0	2	6	1	0	1	0
2017–18	SCL Tigers	NL	46	7	11	18	45	—	—	—	—	—
2018–19	SCL Tigers	NL	43	7	5	12	12	3	1	1	2	0
2019–20	EHC Biel	NL	36	3	1	4	16	—	—	—	—	—
2020–21	EHC Biel	NL	40	1	3	4	14	2	0	0	0	0
2021–22	IF Sundsvall	Div.1	30	7	21	28	41	—	—	—	—	—
SHL totals			19	0	0	0	2	6	1	0	1	0
NL totals			269	34	42	76	117	6	1	1	2	0

Awards and achievements
Preceded by Karl Alzner	Washington Capitals first-round draft pick 2008	Succeeded by John Carlson
