= 2012–13 National League B season =

- League: National League B
- Sport: Ice hockey
- Duration: September 14, 2012 – February 10, 2013
- Games: 50
- Teams: 11

Regular Season
- Season Champions: HC Ajoie
- Top scorer: Marco Truttmann (EHC Olten), James Desmarais (HC Ajoie)

Playoffs

Swiss champion NLB
- Champions: Lausanne HC
- Runners-up: EHC Olten

National League B seasons
- 2011–12 2013–14

The 2012–13 National League B season was played from September 14, 2012, to February 10, 2013. The regular season was won by HC Ajoie with 105 points.

== Participating teams ==
NLB teams for the 2012-13 season.

== Regular Season Standings ==
	Team	GP	Pts	W	L	OTW	OTL	SHW	SHL
1.	HC Ajoie	50	105	31	12	1	1	4	1
2.	SC Langenthal	50	103	29	11	3	1	3	3
3.	EHC Olten	50	102	32	14	0	0	2	2
4.	Lausanne HC	50	98	31	16	1	0	1	1
5.	EHC Visp	50	85	23	17	2	1	4	3
6.	Chx-de-Fds	50	83	23	17	2	1	2	5
7.	GCK Lions	50	70	22	24	0	2	0	2
8.	HC Red Ice	50	69	18	21	0	4	4	3
9.	EHC Basel Sharks	50	64	18	26	2	1	2	1
10.	HC Thurgau	50	26	6	38	0	1	2	3
11.	HC Sierre-Anniviers	50	20	5	42	1	0	1	1

== Playoffs ==
Quarter-Finals
1	HC Ajoie	4
8	HC Red Ice	2
2	SC Langenthal	4
7	GCK Lions	0
(Pairings are reseeded after the first round)
3	EHC Olten	4
6	Chx-de-Fds	3
4	Lausanne HC	4
5	EHC Visp	1

Semi-Finals
1	HC Ajoie	2
4	Lausanne HC	4
2	SC Langenthal	2
3	EHC Olten	4

Finals
4	Lausanne HC	4
3	EHC Olten	0

== League Qualification ==
Lausanne HC will play the losing team of a Play-Out tournament from the National League A for the 12th and final spot in the top division next year.
