= 2014–15 National League B season =

- League: National League B
- Sport: Ice hockey
- Duration: September 2014 – February 2015
- Games: 48
- Teams: 9

Regular Season
- Season Champions: SCL Tigers
- Top scorer: James Desmarais (EHC Visp)

Playoffs
- Semi-Final champions: SCL Tigers
- Semi-Final runners-up: SC Langenthal
- Semi-Final champions: EHC Olten
- Semi-Final runners-up: HC Red Ice

Swiss champion NLB
- Champions: SCL Tigers
- Runners-up: EHC Olten

National League B seasons
- 2013–14 2015–16

The 2014–15 National League B season was the 68th ice hockey season of Switzerland's second tier hockey league, the National League B

== Teams ==
NLB teams for the 2013-14 season.

Team	City	Arena	Capacity
HC Ajoie	Porrentruy	Patinoire de Porrentruy	4,300
HC La Chaux-de-Fonds	La Chaux-de-Fonds	Patinoire des Mélèzes	7,200
SC Langenthal	Langenthal	Schoren Halle	4,320
GCK Lions	Küsnacht	Eishalle Küsnacht	2,200
EHC Olten	Olten	Kleinholz Stadion	6,500
HC Red Ice	Martigny	Forum d'Octodure	4,500
HC Thurgau	Weinfelden	Güttingersreuti	3,200
SCL Tigers	Langnau im Emmental	Ilfis Stadium	6,500
EHC Visp	Visp	Litternahalle	4,300

== Regular season ==
Final standings.

Rank	Team	GP	W	L	OTW	OTL	SOW	SOL	Goals	Diff.	Pts
1	SCL Tigers	48	29	9	4	2	4	2	182:126	56	103
2	HC Red Ice	48	21	17	3	1	4	2	147:133	14	80
3	Chx-de-Fds	48	22	17	2	1	1	5	157:148	9	78
4	EHC Visp	48	19	17	4	3	3	2	190:162	28	76
5	EHC Olten	48	20	21	2	4	1	0	160:156	4	70
6	SC Langenthal	48	15	19	5	4	3	2	140:147	-7	67
7	HC Ajoie	48	15	20	3	3	4	6	137:152	-15	62
8	HC Thurgau	48	13	24	2	4	4	1	112:156	-44	56
9	GCK Lions	48	11	21	3	6	4	3	124:169	-45	56

== Playoffs ==
Quarter-Finals
1	SCL Tigers	4
8	HC Thurgau	0
2	HC Red Ice	4
7	HC Ajoie	2
(Pairings are reseeded after the first round)
3	Chx-de-Fds	3
6	SC Langenthal	4
4	EHC Visp	0
5	EHC Olten	4

Semi-Finals
1	SCL Tigers	4
6	SC Langenthal	0
2	HC Red Ice	1
5	EHC Olten	4

Finals
1	SCL Tigers	4
5	EHC Olten	3

== League Qualification ==
=== Lakers vs. SCL Tigers ===
2 April 2015; 19:45	Lakers	2–4 (0–0, 2–2, 0–2)	SCL Tigers	Diners Club Arena, Rapperswil; Attendance: 5,191

Game reference

Tim Wolf
Goalies
Damiano Ciaccio
Referees:
Didier Massy
Marc Wiegand
Linesmen:
Franco Espinoza
Peter Küng

D. Weisskopf 22:04	1–0
	1–1	23:59 S. Lindemann
	1–2	32:02 K. Hecquefeuille (L. Haas, C. DiDomenico) (PP)
E. Walsky 33:27	2–2
	2–3	57:39 S. Lindemann (K. Lindemann
	2–4	59:12 A. Gerber (A. Gustafsson, L. Haas)

8 min
Penalties
31 min
25
Shots
33

4 April 2015; 19:45	SCL Tigers	4–3 OT (2–0, 0–2, 1–1) (OT 1–0)	Lakers	Ilfis Stadium, Langnau im Emmental; Attendance: 6,050

Game reference

Damiano Ciaccio
Goalies
Tim Wolf
Referees:
Stefan Eichmann
Daniel Stricker
Linesmen:
Nicolas Fluri
Michael Tscherrig

L. Haas (S. Lindemann, C. DiDomenico) 16:28	1–0
T. Bucher (C. DiDomenico) (PP) 17:33	2–0
	2–1	23:59 P. Obrist (S. Ryser, J. Murray)
	2–2	30:08 J. Murray (S. Ryser, P. Obrist)
S. Lindemann (C. Moggi, L. Haas) (PP) 41:38	3–2
	3–3	59:52 J. Fransson (S. Ryser, M. Johansson)
C. DiDomenico (PP) 66:41	4–3

6 min
Penalties
18 min
43
Shots
32

6 April 2015; 16:30	Lakers	3–4 OT (1–0, 0–3, 2–0) (OT 0–1)	SCL Tigers	Diners Club Arena, Rapperswil; Attendance: 6,017

Game reference

Tim Wolf
Goalies
Damiano Ciaccio
Referees:
Danny Kurmann
Marcus Vinnerborg
Linesmen:
Roman Kaderli
Simon Wüst

A. Rizzelo (M. Johansson) 16:29	1–0
	1–1	27:01 Y. Müller (C. DiDomenico, M. Stettler (PP)
	1–2	34:49 Y. Müller (S. Lindemann, L. Haas)
	1–3	39:56 T. Bucher (A. Gustafsson, C. DiDomenico)
D. Weisskopf (J. Fransson, M. Johansson) (PP) 55:38	2–3
M. Johansson (S. Ryser, J. Fransson) (PP) 59:38	3–3
	3–4	63:26 A. Gustafsson (C. DiDomenico, T. Bucher)

30 min
Penalties
40 min
18
Shots
12

9 April 2015; 19:45	SCL Tigers	5–1 (2–0, 0–1, 3–0)	Lakers	Ilfis Stadium, Langnau im Emmental; Attendance: 6,050

Game reference

Damiano Ciaccio
Goalies
Ivars Punnenovs
Referees:
Didier Massy
Marc Wiegand
Linesmen:
Franco Espinoza
Peter Küng

T. Bucher (C. DiDomenico) 2:58	1–0
L. Haas 3:35	2–0
	2–1	30:16 D. Walser (N. Berger, A. Rizzelo)
C. DiDomenico (A. Gerber) 53:04	3–1
L. Haas (S. Lindemann, Y. Müller) 53:38	4–1
K. Hecquefeuille (PP) 57:53	5–1

8 min
Penalties
31 min
28
Shots
38

SCL Tigers won series 4–0

SCL Tigers won the series and were promoted to NLA and will play there in 2015–16 season. Rapperswil-Jona Lakers were relegated to National League B and will play there in 2015–16 season.
