= John Carlson (ice hockey) =

American ice hockey player (born 1990)

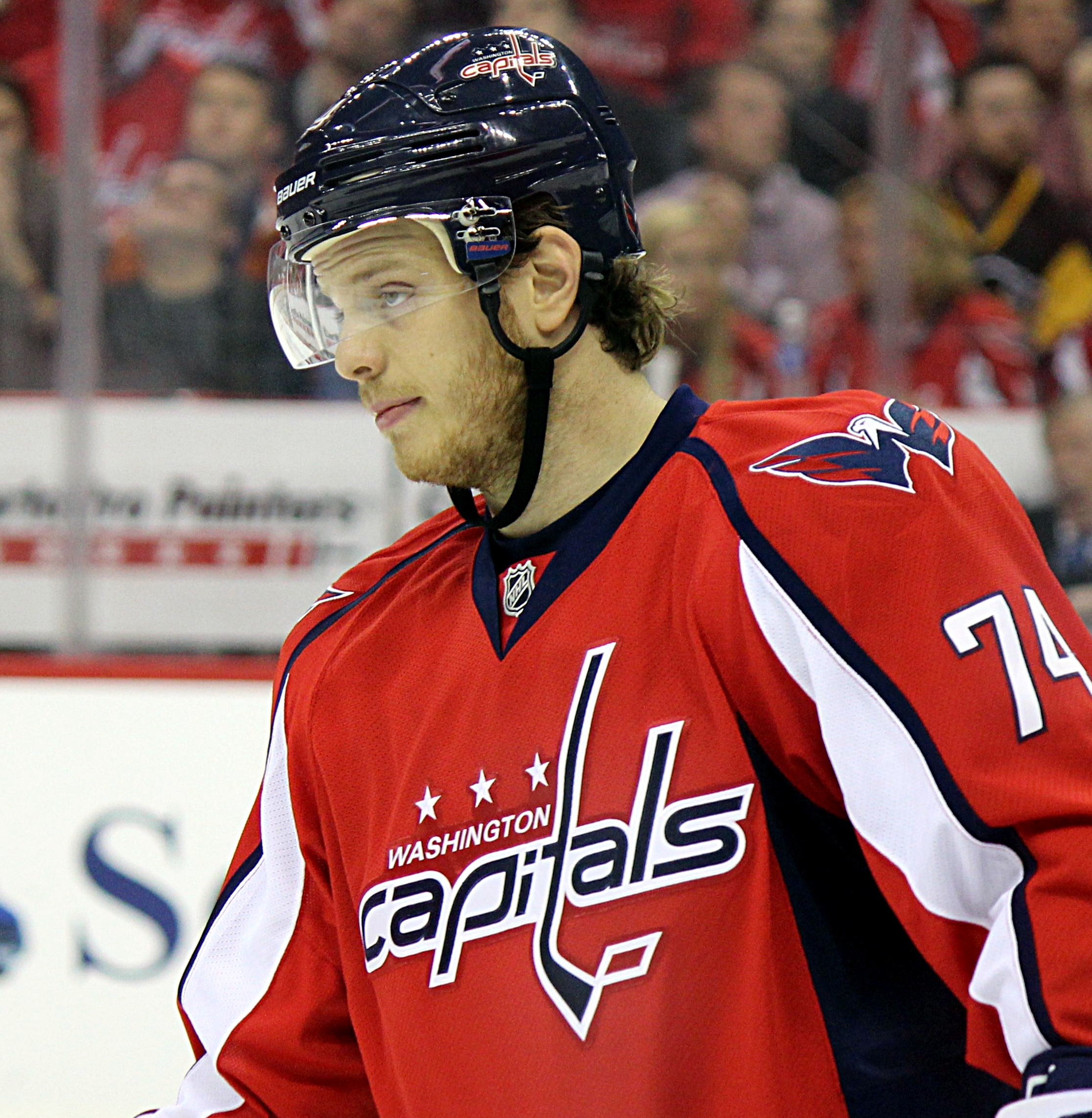
- Carlson with the Washington Capitals in April 2016
- Born: January 10, 1990 (age 36) Natick, Massachusetts, U.S.
- Height: 6 ft 3 in (191 cm)
- Weight: 218 lb (99 kg; 15 st 8 lb)
- Position: Defense
- Shoots: Right
- NHL team Former teams: Tampa Bay Lightning; Washington Capitals; Anaheim Ducks
- National team: United States
- NHL draft: 27th overall, 2008; Washington Capitals
- Playing career: 2009–present

John Carlson (born January 10, 1990) is an American professional ice hockey player who is a defenseman for the Tampa Bay Lightning of the National Hockey League (NHL). He was drafted by the Washington Capitals in the first round, 27th overall, in the 2008 NHL entry draft after playing a year in the United States Hockey League (USHL) with the Indiana Ice. He has also played for the Anaheim Ducks. Before reaching the NHL, Carlson played junior hockey in the Ontario Hockey League (OHL) with the London Knights and played professionally with the Capitals' American Hockey League (AHL) affiliate, the Hershey Bears. He also participated internationally for the United States in the 2010 World Juniors and 2014 Winter Olympics. Carlson won the Stanley Cup as a member of the Capitals in 2018, as the highest-scoring defenseman during the playoffs.

== Early life ==
Carlson was born in Natick, Massachusetts, on January 10, 1990, to parents Richard Carlson and Angela Dalle-Molle. Carlson is of Swedish descent on his father's side. The family of four lived in Marlborough, Massachusetts, where Carlson learned to skate, until his father accepted a job in New Jersey when John was around five years old.

== Playing career ==
=== Minor and Junior ===
After his family moved to the Colonia section of Woodbridge Township, New Jersey, Carlson and his brother Andrew played junior hockey for the New Jersey Rockets in the Atlantic Youth Hockey League. In his freshman year at St. Joseph High School, Carlson played for both the varsity team and the Rockets in the 2004–05 season. He recalled being one of a few players who joined the Rockets Junior A team at the age of 15. Carlson played all 21 games for St. Joseph, registering 12 goals and 19 points, to help lead the team to the New Jersey State Interscholastic Athletic Association Sweet 16 tournament. However, this would be his only season playing for St. Joseph as he then dedicated his sophomore and junior years to the Rockets. While playing for the Rockets under coach Bob Thornton during the 2006–07 season, Carlson scored 50 points in 44 games to earn the Atlantic Junior Hockey League Offensive Defenseman of the Year Award. Throughout his time with the Rockets organization, Carlson gained the attention of scouts for the National Hockey League (NHL) and United States Hockey League (USHL). He was also recruited by Hockey Hall of Fame defenseman Bobby Orr to become his client.

The attention eventually resulted in him transferring to Cathedral High School in Indianapolis for his senior year to play one season with the Indiana Ice in the USHL. As a 17-year-old, Carlson played 59 games with the Ice, recording 12 goals and 43 points. He was subsequently named to the USHL's 2007–08 Second All-Star Team and All-Rookie Team. Before the start of the 2007–08 season, Carlson committed to play college hockey for the University of Massachusetts Amherst and expressed his excitement to join the team. However, after he was drafted by the London Knights in the 2008 Ontario Hockey League (OHL) draft, Carlson chose them over the NCAA. Before the 2008 NHL entry draft, Carlson signed an Ontario Hockey League (OHL) contract with the Knights. Leading up to the draft, Carlson was ranked 17th among North American skaters by the NHL Central Scouting Bureau and was expected to be drafted in the first round. He was eventually drafted in the first round, 27th overall, by the Washington Capitals.

Following the NHL draft, Carlson participated in the Washington Capitals training camp and played in two preseason games before joining the Knights for the 2008–09 season. After scoring four goals and 10 assists over his first 12 games, Carlson signed an entry-level contract with the Capitals on November 13. Carlson's defensive play helped the Knights hold a 9–1–0–0 record through December and he began the 2009 calendar year ranked third among all rookies in scoring. As a result, Carlson was named the OHL Rookie of the Month for December. Carlson also led all OHL defencemen in scoring through January and was recognized as the OHL's Defenceman of the Month. During the month, he scored points in nine games and maintained a five-game scoring streak. He was also selected to participate in the 2009 OHL All-Star Classic. He finished the regular season with 16 goals and 60 assists through 59 games and added another 22 points over 14 playoffs games. He was recognized by the Knights at the end of the season with various honors, which included the Booster Club player of the year, play-off performer of the year, best defenseman, rookie of the year, and most valuable player. The OHL also selected him for the OHL Second All-Star Team, OHL First All-Rookie Team, and the CHL All-Rookie team.

=== Professional (2009–present) ===
==== Washington Capitals (2009–2026) ====
===== Early years and development (2009–2013) =====
After the Knights were eliminated from the playoffs, the Capitals reassigned Carlson to their American Hockey League (AHL) affiliate, the Hershey Bears, for the 2009 Calder Cup playoffs run. He made his professional debut in Game 1 of the division finals against the Wilkes-Barre/Scranton Penguins and scored his first professional goal in Game 2. Carlson finished the playoffs with three points over 16 games en route to the Hershey Bears' 10th Calder Cup championship title.

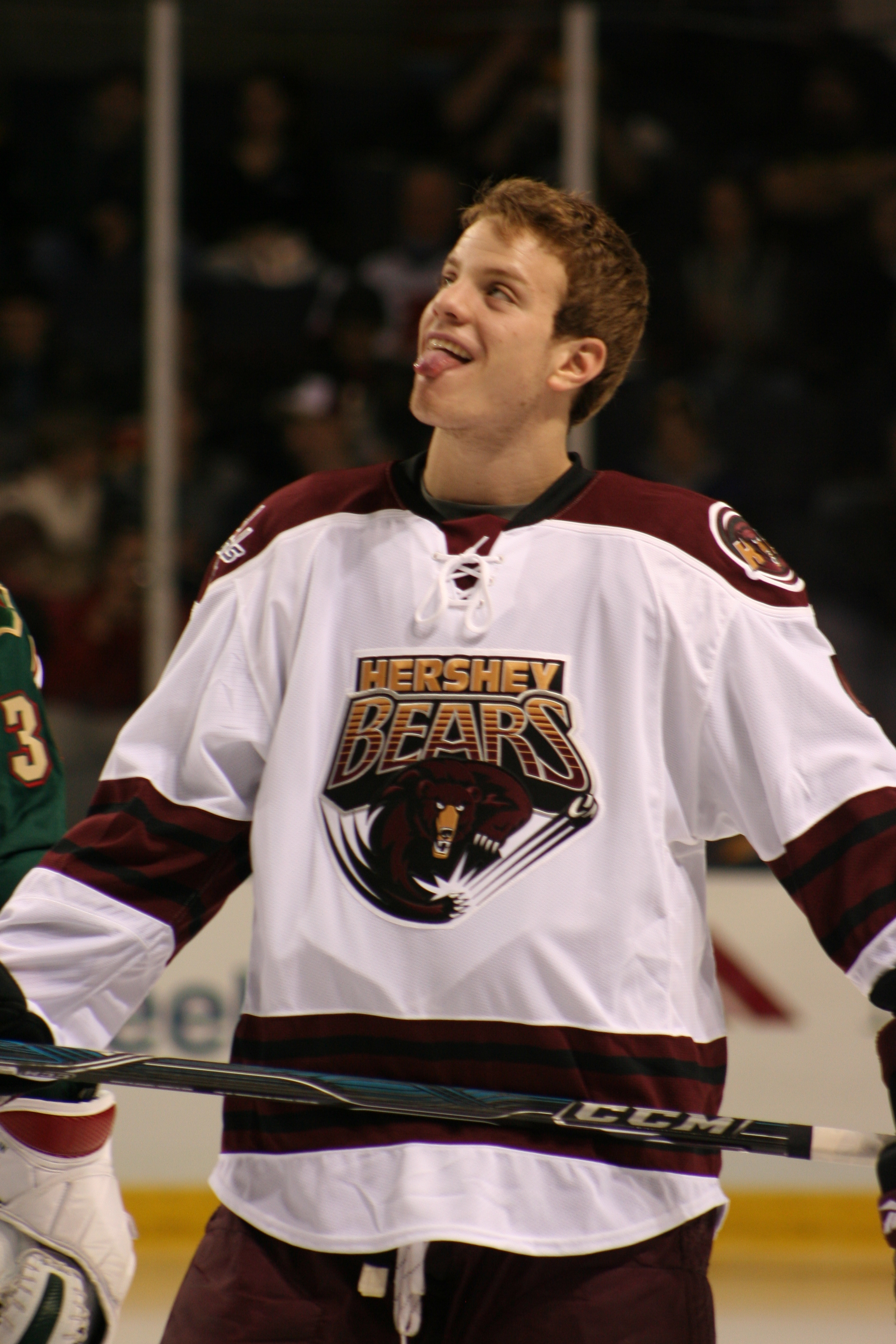
Carlson with the Hershey Bears during the 2009–10 season.

Carlson stood out to the Capitals coaching staff while attending their development camp ahead of the 2009–10 season. Capitals head coach Bruce Boudreau described him as "easily" the most NHL-ready out of all the prospects in attendance. Carlson was reassigned to the Bears to start the 2009–10 season. He scored his first AHL regular season goal on October 17, 2009, against the Binghamton Senators. He tallied four assists in the next few games and finished the month leading all Hershey defensemen in scoring. He was called up to the NHL level on November 18 and given the jersey number 74. He made his NHL debut two nights later, on November 20, 2009, against the Montreal Canadiens. At the age of 19, Carlson became the youngest player to make his debut with the Capitals since Alexander Semin in 2003–04. He played 17:24 minutes in his debut and recorded one shot on net. Carlson remained in the NHL for two more games before being returned to the Bears. Upon returning to the AHL, Carlson was selected for the AHL All-Star Games and was loaned to United States junior team for the 2010 World Junior Championships. Following the tournament, Carlson alternated between the two teams before finally staying with the Capitals from March until the end of the season. He finished the 2009–10 AHL season ranking fourth among all rookie defensemen with four goals and 35 assists through 48 games. As such, he was selected for the 2010 AHL All-Rookie team. While he did not finish the regular season with the Bears, Carlson was honored as their Rookie of the Year and best defenseman.

Carlson scored his first career NHL goal against the Carolina Hurricanes on March 25, 2010. Despite losing 3–2, Carlson tied an NHL record by being one of three rookie defensemen to score a goal that game. He finished the regular season with six points through 22 games and remained eligible for rookie status the following season. While both the Bears and Capitals qualified for the playoffs, Carlson remained at the NHL level for the entirety of their conference quarterfinals series against the Canadiens. As a 20-year-old rookie, Carlson played in all seven games and ranked third among Capitals defensemen in ice time. He scored his first NHL playoff point, an assist, in Game 1, and tallied his first playoff goal in Game 2. His goal forced the game to overtime where teammate Nicklas Bäckström secured the win for the Capitals. Carlson finished the playoffs with one goal and three assists as the Canadiens eliminated the Capitals in seven games, squandering a 3–1 series lead in the process. Following their elimination, he rejoined the Bears for their second-round series against the Albany River Rats. Carlson recorded one assist and six shots on net in Game 4 to help the Bears advance to the AHL's conference finals. However, he struggled throughout the series, and tallied only one assist over six games as the Bears advanced to the 2010 Calder Cup Finals. Carlson tallied his first goal of the AHL postseason in Game 4 of the Calder Cup Finals against the Texas Stars to even the series 2–2. His second goal came in Game 6 to help lead the Bears to back-to-back Calder Cup championships.

Carlson played the entirety of the 2010–11 season at the NHL level for the first time in his career. Due to their play in the 2011 playoffs, Boudreau reunited Carlson with his former defensive partner Karl Alzner for the majority of the season. As the season progressed, the duo began to earn more on-ice responsibilities such as playing against the opposing team's top players, and spending time on the Capitals powerplay and penalty kill unit. Carlson ended the regular season with seven goals and 30 assists to tie a franchise record for most points by a rookie defenseman in a single season. Despite suffering a hip injury in Game 1 of the 2011 playoffs, Carlson averaged over 25 minutes of ice time through their first-round series against the eighth-seeded New York Rangers. After eliminating the Rangers, the top-seeded Capitals faced the fifth-seeded Tampa Bay Lightning in the conference semifinals. In the semifinals series, Carlson and Alexander Ovechkin were the only two Capitals players to score more than one goal as the Lightning swept them in four games.

After the Capitals were eliminated from the 2012 playoffs in the second round in seven games by the top-seeded New York Rangers, interim head coach Dale Hunter voluntarily stepped down and was replaced by Adam Oates. The day before the start of the 2012–13 NHL lockout, Carlson signed a six-year, $23.8 million contract extension with the Capitals. Due to the lockout, NHL players did not have access to the team's practice facilities or trainers. In order to remain in shape, Carlson, Jason Chimera, and Jay Beagle paid $360 an hour four times a week to rent ice time at the Kettler Capitals Iceplex. Once the lockout officially ended in January 2013, Carlson and his teammates were able to practice in their team's facilities once again. While Carlson was originally reunited with Alzner to start the shortened season, Oates split the duo up after four consecutive poor performances. Over the first three games of the season, Carlson and Alzner allowed approximately nine goals to be scored against the team out of a total of 14. Following the split, Carlson played the remainder of the season with either John Erskine or Jack Hillen. On February 15, 2013, Carlson recorded an assist in his 200th career NHL game to lift the Capitals to a 4–3 win over the Tampa Bay Lightning. The following month, Carlson was one of four Capitals players to score a goal in the first eight minutes of a game against the Florida Panthers. At the time, these were the second-fastest four goals scored in franchise history and the Capitals won the game 7–1. He finished the season with six goals and 16 assists for 22 points through 48 games.

===== Finding success and winning the Stanley Cup (2013–2019) =====
Carlson began the 2013–14 season on a different defensive unit than Alzner. However, the duo were swiftly reunited as the Capitals top defensive unit midway through October as other teammates struggled. He finished the month with no goals and two assists through 12 games but began improving through November. Carlson scored his 100th NHL point, and his first goal of the season, on November 2, 2013, against the Florida Panthers. By November 27, 2013, he had added five goals and four assists over 12 games while averaging a career-high 23:53 minutes of ice time. On January 1, 2014, Carlson was named to the Team USA for the 2014 Winter Olympics. As numerous NHL players were playing in the Olympics, the league paused play from February 9 to 25. Shortly before leaving for Sochi, Carlson set a new franchise record for defensemen by playing in his 272nd consecutive game with the Capitals. Over the final 16 games of the regular season, Carlson tallied 14 points on the power-play to rank ninth among defenseman in power-play points. He finished the season with a career-best 10 goals and 37 points while playing in every single game for the fourth consecutive season. The Capitals narrowly failed to qualify for the 2014 playoffs, finishing ninth in the East and coming just three points short from the last playoff spot, marking the first time since 2007 and in Carlson's career where the Capitals missed the playoffs. However, this would be the last time the Capitals failed to qualify for the playoffs until 2023.

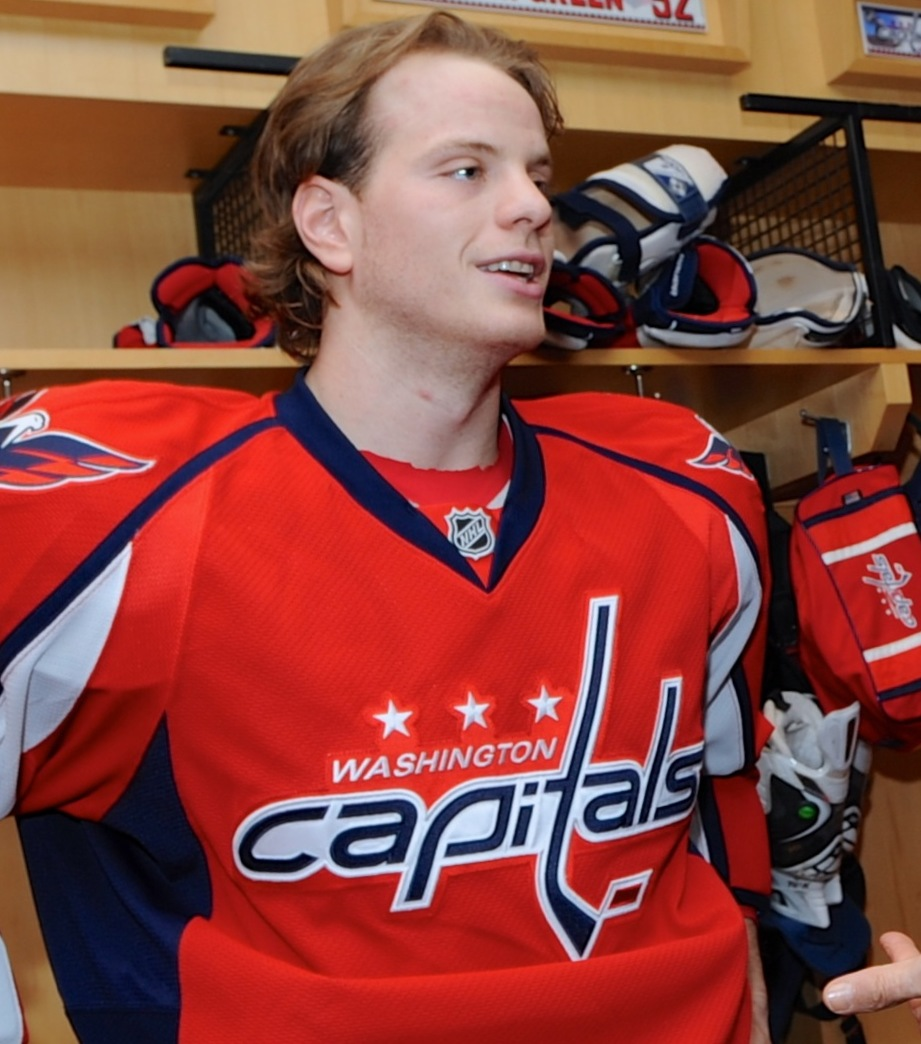
Carlson with the Capitals in February 2014.

In the 2014 off-season, the Capitals hired Barry Trotz as head coach, Todd Reirden as an assistant coach and signed veteran defenseman Brooks Orpik. Upon joining the Capitals organization, Reirden worked closely with Carlson to improve his effectiveness during shifts. One of his solutions involved pairing Carlson with Orpik for the 2014–15 season. On October 16, 2014, Carlson became the first defenseman in franchise history to play 300 consecutive games with the Capitals. In late November, Carlson tallied his 100th NHL assist and moved into 10th all-time among Capitals defensemen in total assists. After scoring a goal on January 10, 2015, Carlson struggled through a month-long goalless drought. He broke this streak on February 11 by tallying a goal and an assist against the San Jose Sharks. These two points, which accounted for his 37th and 38th of the season, set a new career-high and put him on pace for 46 assists overall. After ending the regular season with a career-high 12 goals and 43 assists for 55 points in all 82 games, Carlson finished in 10th place in James Norris Memorial Trophy voting.

Carlson's 2015–16 season was interrupted by an injury that limited him to playing just 56 regular-season games. This ended his Ironman streak of playing in all regular season games from 2010–11 to 2014–15. On October 14, 2015, Carlson played in his 400th NHL game, and 380th consecutive game, in a 5–0 shutout loss to the San Jose Sharks. During November, Carlson's usual defensive partner Brooks Orpik was injured, resulting in Carlson being paired with Nate Schmidt and becoming an alternate captain. Carlson scored his 200th career point, an assist, on November 5, in a 4–1 win over the Boston Bruins. Later that month, he played in his 400th consecutive NHL game to clinch the record for second-longest Ironman streak in franchise history. However, this streak would never surpass second place as he suffered an injury during a game against Montreal on December 26. Following an MRI, it was announced that he would need three to four weeks to recover. At the time, Carlson had recorded six goals and 21 assists while also playing on the first power-play unit and the penalty kill. The setback ended his ironman streak at 412 consecutive games, falling just 10 shy of Bob Carpenter's franchise record. He returned to the Capitals lineup after missing 12 games but re-injured himself in February. He missed 13 games to recover and scored the game-winning goal in his return on March 25, 2016. Despite missing significant stretches, Carlson scored eight goals and 31 points by the end of the regular season to help the Capitals qualify for the 2016 Stanley Cup playoffs and win the Presidents' Trophy as the top regular season team. In their first-round series against the Philadelphia Flyers, Carlson scored back-to-back game-winning goals to clinch wins in games 1 and 2. The Capitals eventually defeated the Flyers in six games. In the second round, Carlson tied Scott Stevens and Kevin Hatcher's franchise record for most goals by a defenseman in a single postseason. The Capitals would be defeated in six games by the eventual Stanley Cup champion Pittsburgh Penguins.

Over the 2016 off-season, Carlson was selected to compete for Team USA at the 2016 World Cup of Hockey. Upon starting the 2016–17 season without a goal, it was revealed that he had suffered an injury during the tournament. As Alzner was finding success with Matt Niskanen, the Capitals coaching staff paired Carlson with Dmitry Orlov. However, after reuniting Carlson with Alzner on December 5, the Capitals went on a lengthy winning streak. Carlson suffered his second injury in two seasons during a game against the Flyers on January 16. He missed six games to recover before returning to the Capitals lineup on January 31 against the New York Islanders. On February 8, Carlson tallied his 196th NHL point, an assist, to help the Capitals shutout the Carolina Hurricanes. His assist lifted him over Sylvain Côté for sole possession of seventh place on the franchise's all-time list for assists by a defenseman. Carlson finished the regular season three games early after suffering a second injury on April 2. Despite this, he finished with nine goals and 28 assists while averaging a team-high 22:43 minutes of ice time per game as the Capitals clinched a second consecutive Presidents' Trophy and third overall.

As the Capitals lost three defensemen during the 2017 offseason, and veteran right-handed defenceman Matt Niskanen suffered an early season injury, more responsibility was expected of Carlson in the 2017–18 season. He started the season skating alongside veteran Brooks Orpik, but saw increased playing time with rookie Christian Djoos through December. Alongside these two teammates, Carlson scored three goals and 22 assists in 34 games. Despite experiencing a lengthy scoring drought, Carlson finished the regular season with numerous personal records. He recorded a career-high 15 goals and 53 assists for 68 points. Carlson also became the first Capitals defenseman since Mike Green in 2009–10 to score 60 points in a season. That season, the Capitals reached the 2018 Stanley Cup playoffs as the Metropolitan Division champions and second seed in the East.

The Capitals faced off against the Columbus Blue Jackets in the first round of the 2018 Stanley Cup playoffs. In Game 2, Carlson assisted on all three of his team's goals to set a new single-game postseason high. He also became the first Capitals player to have three assists in a playoff game since Ovechkin in 2010. He repeated this feat in Game 2. As the Capitals defeated the Blue Jackets, Carlson finished the first round tied for the league lead in scoring among defensemen with nine points. He also tied Kevin Hatcher's franchise record for the most points in a playoff series by a defenseman. After the Capitals beat the Penguins in the second round, they faced the top-seeded Tampa Bay Lightning before defeating the Vegas Golden Knights in the Stanley Cup Final. Carlson assisted on Ovechkin's goal in the Cup-winning game to clinch the franchise record for career playoff goals and points. After winning the Stanley Cup, Carlson signed an eight-year, $64 million contract extension with the Capitals.

Carlson recorded three goals and six assists through the Capitals' first six games of the 2018–19 season, while also averaging 26 minutes of ice time per game. He missed one game in early November with a lower-body injury, but returned to the lineup on November 11, 2018, for his 623rd career game. This milestone allowed him to pass Côté for sixth place in games played all-time for the Capitals. By November 25, Carlson became the first defenseman in franchise history to record 25 points through his first 22 games of a season. Shortly thereafter, Carlson passed Mike Green for fifth place on the Capitals' all-time scoring list for defensemen. By January, Carlson ranked fourth in the NHL in points among defensemen while also averaging 25:20 minutes of ice time per game. He was recognized by the league with a selection to his first NHL All-Star Game. While he started the season playing alongside Michal Kempny, who was his defensive partner in the 2018 playoffs, an injury to Kempny resulted in coach Reirden trying different players with Carlson. He ended the season with 13 goals and 70 points in 80 games. He finished fourth in Norris Trophy voting, behind Victor Hedman, Brent Burns, and Mark Giordano.

===== Final years with the team (2019–2026) =====
Due to the retirement of Orpik in the 2019 off-season, the Capitals appointed Carlson as a full-time alternate captain for the 2019–20 season. In this new role, Carlson executed an immediate output through October which set league, franchise, and personal records. He became the first Capitals defenseman, and third player overall, to record 14 points through the team's first eight games. By October 23, 2019, he had become the fourth defenseman in NHL history to record 20 or more points through October and the fastest to do so since 1988–99. He also became the third defenseman in NHL history to lead the league in scoring through the first 20 days of the season. Carlson finished October with 23 points to establish a new franchise record for most points by a defenseman in one month. He also tied Ovechkin's single month points record set in 2009 and tied Kevin Hatcher for third place on the franchise's all-time points list among defensemen. In recognition of his efforts, the NHL honored Carlson as the First Star of the Month for October. After tallying three points on November 7, Carlson passed Hatcher for sole possession of third place on the franchise's all-time points list among defensemen. He continued to grow his points total through November and maintained a seven-game streak that resulted in 11 points. On December 4, Carlson scored his 10th goal of the season, and 100th career NHL goal, against the Los Angeles Kings. This goal brought his points total to 43 and tied him with Denis Potvin and Al MacInnis for the second most in NHL history by a defenseman through 30 games. He was subsequently recognized as the NHL's First Star of the Week ending on December 9 after recording six points over three games. A few days later, Carlson tallied the game-winning goal to lift the Capitals over the Boston Bruins. Upon scoring this goal, he became the fastest Capitals defenseman to reach 45 points since MacInnis in 1990–91. Carlson was then selected for his second constructive NHL All-Star Game. At the time of his selection, he ranked first among all NHL defensemen with 37 assists and 50 points and was the first defenseman since Paul Coffey to record 50 points in his team's first 40 games. Before leaving for the NHL All-Star Game, Carlson became the fastest defenseman in franchise history to reach the 60-point mark in a season. As a member of the Metropolitan Division All-Stars, Carlson became the first defenseman in Capitals history to score a goal in the NHL All-Star Game.

Shortly after returning from the All-Star Game, Carlson passed Calle Johansson to become the franchise leader in assists by a defenseman. On February 23, Carlson tallied an assist on Tom Wilson's goal to pass Johansson once again and become the Capitals franchise leader in points by a defenseman. When the NHL paused play due to the COVID-19 pandemic, Carlson led all NHL defensemen with 15 goals and 75 points through 69 games. He was named a finalist for the Norris Trophy as the NHL's best defenseman, but lost to Nashville's Roman Josi. When the NHL returned to play for the 2020 Stanley Cup playoffs, the Capitals moved into the Toronto Bubble along with 11 other Eastern Conference teams. Upon entering the Bubble, the Capitals played an exhibition game against the Carolina Hurricanes before the round-robin tournament began to determine the final playoff seeding. However, after suffering an injury in the Capital's sole exhibition game, Carlson sat out of their round-robin games to recover. He officially made his postseason debut in Game 1 of the first round against the New York Islanders. In his first game back, Carlson tallied two assists and recorded a fight against Anders Lee in a 4–2 loss to the Islanders. After another loss, Carlson's regular defensive partner Michal Kempný was made a healthy scratch for game 3. Despite this change, the Capitals lost their third consecutive game and faced the prospect of elimination. He finished the playoffs with six assists as the Capitals were eliminated from the playoffs in five games. Carlson was named to the 2019–20 NHL First All-Star Team.

Following the Capital's early elimination from the 2020 playoffs, head coach Todd Reirden was fired and replaced with Peter Laviolette. The team also made numerous high-profile off-season acquisitions, including signing veteran defensemen Zdeno Chára. Due to COVID-19 cross-border travel restrictions, the pandemic-shortened 2020–21 season resulted in a realignment of the four conferences. The Capitals were placed in the East Division and only competed against the Boston Bruins, Buffalo Sabres, New Jersey Devils, New York Islanders, New York Rangers, Philadelphia Flyers, and Pittsburgh Penguins. On March 11, Carlson recorded his sixth goal of the season in a 5–3 win over the Flyers. He subsequently became the third-fastest active NHL defenseman to reach his 500th point milestone. He continued to reach new milestones and climb the franchise's all-time list throughout April. On April 1, Carlson tallied his 113th and 114th career NHL goals to move into sole possession of third all-time in franchise history. Three days later, Carlson recorded his 400th career assist in his 800th NHL game. While he already held the franchise record for assists by a defenseman, he became the second player in franchise history to skate in 800 games. On April 17, Carlson became the fifth defenseman in franchise history to record four assists in a single game and the first to do so in the 21st century. A cracked kneecap forced Carlson to miss four of the final seven games of the season and severely impacted his play during the 2021 Stanley Cup playoffs.

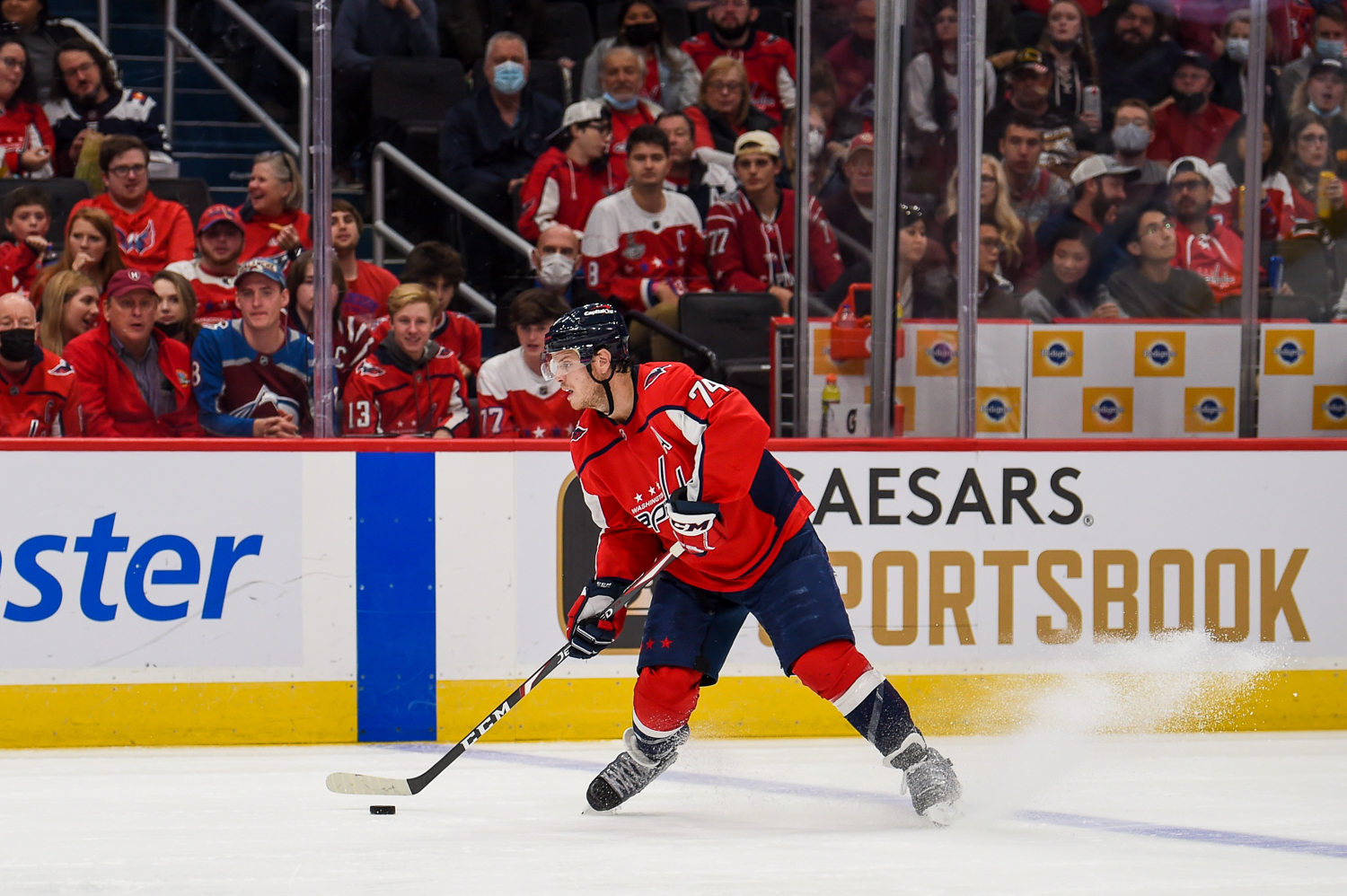
Carlson playing with the Capitals in October 2021.

Carlson underwent surgery over the 2021 off-season to repair his kneecap, but was healthy enough to participate in the Capitals' training camp. He then spent the entirety of the 2021–22 season playing alongside Martin Fehérváry and finished with 17 goals and 54 assists for 71 points in 78 games. Carlson accumulated three goals and 13 assists through mid-November to rank second among all NHL defensemen in scoring. After tallying two assists in a game against the San Jose Sharks on November 20, Carlson overtook Michal Pivoňka for third place on the franchise's all-time assist list. By the end of December, Carlson ranked third among NHL defensemen with seven goals and 23 assists. On January 16, 2022, Carlson missed his first game of the season after being placed on the Capitals COVID-19 protocol list. He subsequently missed four games due to COVID-19 and returned to the Capitals lineup on January 24. By mid-March, Carlson became the first defenseman in franchise history to record five seasons with 40 or more assists. Carlson set new personal and franchise records in April as the Capitals pushed to qualify for the 2022 playoffs. He started the month with eight points through three games and was recognised by the NHL as the league's second star of the week. On April 23, Carlson set a new career-high in goals after recording his 16th of the season against the Arizona Coyotes. The following game, Carlson became the 18th defenseman in NHL history to record 70 points in at least three seasons. Once the regular season concluded, the Capitals faced the Florida Panthers in the first round of the 2022 playoffs, where they were eliminated in six games.

Carlson started the 2022–23 season reunited with Fehérváry and tallied six points in nine games before suffering an injury. He missed six gamed after being placed on injured reserve before returning to the Capitals lineup on November 11. In his first game back, he became the first defenseman in franchise history to record 600 career points. He also passed Pivoňka for fifth place on the franchise's all-time points list. On November 17, Carlson scored two goals in his 900th NHL game to secure a win for the Capitals. At 32 years and 311 days old, Carlson also became the third-youngest player in franchise history to reach this milestone. In the Capitals final game before the league's mandated holiday break, Carlson suffered a fractured skull and lacerated temporal artery after being accidentally struck in the head by a puck. He was immediately transported to a local hospital for further evaluation and kept overnight. At the time, he led all team defensemen with eight goals and 21 points. Carlson spent the next three months recovering from the injury and worked privately with a skating coach to maintain his form. He returned to the Capitals lineup on March 23, 2023, and scored a goal and an assist in their 6–1 win over the Chicago Blackhawks.

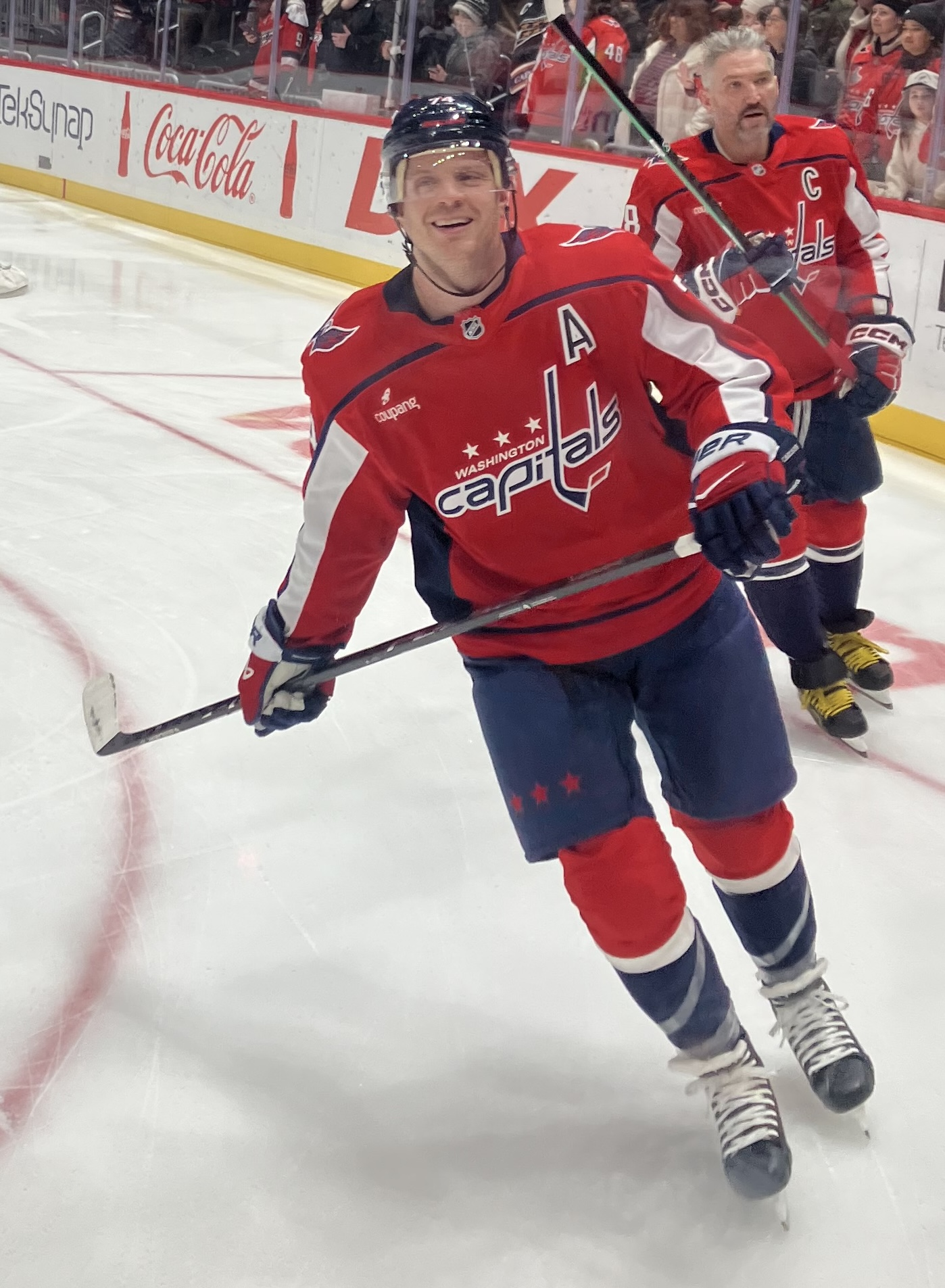
Carlson in 2026

Under the direction of new head coach Spencer Carbery, Carlson started the 2023–24 season playing alongside Rasmus Sandin. On January 5, 2024, Carlson tallied an assist on Dylan Strome's goal in a 6–2 loss to the Hurricanes. He subsequently became the third player in franchise history and 34th defenseman in NHL history to reach the 500 assists milestone. On March 30, 2024, Carlson set another franchise record by playing in his 1,000th NHL game. He was the third Capitals player, and first defenseman, to play all 1,000 games with the Capitals. After also scoring his 149th goal, Carlson tied Kevin Hatcher's franchise record for goals by a defenseman and became the ninth defensemen in NHL history to score a goal in their 1,000th game. Carlson officially passed Hatcher's franchise record the following month after scoring his 150th NHL goal on April 13, 2024, against the Lightning.

Carlson was paired with either Sandin or Fehérváry for the majority of the 2024–25 season. On November 15, 2024, Carlson passed Ryan Suter and Reed Larson for sole possession of eighth place on the all-time points list for American-born defenseman. On January 6, 2025, Carlson became the 13th defenseman in NHL history to score 700 points with one franchise. On January 21, Carlson moved into the top 100 all-time in games played among NHL defensemen. On April 4, Carlson had the primary assist on Alexander Ovechkin's 894th career regular season goal, which tied Wayne Gretzky's all-time goal-scoring record. On February 5, 2026, Carlson suffered a lower-body injury against the Nashville Predators, and left the game early. He was subsequently ruled out for all four of the Capitals' games following the Olympic break, making the Predators game his final appearance with Washington.

==== Anaheim Ducks (2026) ====
On March 5, 2026, after 17 seasons with the Capitals, Carlson was traded to the Anaheim Ducks for a conditional first-round pick in 2026 or 2027, and a third-round pick in 2027. He left the Capitals as the all-time franchise leader for points (771), goals (166), assists (605), and games played (1,143) by a defenseman. Shortly after joining the Ducks, Carlson scored his first NHL hat-trick on April 9. He subsequently became the third NHL defenseman aged 36 or older to record a hat trick, and he played the second-most games for a defenseman before recording his first hat trick.

The Ducks made the playoffs, where they eliminated the Edmonton Oilers in the first round, 4-2. The Ducks eventually fell to the Vegas Golden Knights in six games in the second round.

==== Tampa Bay Lightning (2026–present) ====
With Carlson set to become an unrestricted free agent, his contract rights were traded to the Carolina Hurricanes on June 27, 2026, during the 2026 NHL entry draft, in exchange for Kyle Masters and a sixth round pick in that year's draft. However, Carlson and the Hurricanes were unable to come to an agreement prior to the opening of free agency, and he ultimately signed a two-year, $17 million contract with the Tampa Bay Lightning on July 1.

== International play ==
Medal record

Representing United States

Men's ice hockey

World Junior Championships
| Gold medal – first place | 2010 Canada | |

World Junior A Challenge
| Bronze medal – third place | 2007 Trail | |

Carlson represented the United States under-18 team in the 2007 Ivan Hlinka Memorial Tournament, and then played for the United States junior team in the 2007 World Junior A Challenge. He was later named an alternate captain of the United States team for the 2010 World Junior Championships. On January 5, 2010, he scored the game-winning goal in overtime of the gold medal game as part of a two-goal effort to defeat Canada junior team 6–5. Carlson finished the tournament with seven points in seven games. Additionally, he was named to the tournament's all-star team. In December 2010, Carlson was named to NHL.com's All-Time World Junior Championship team.

Carlson played for the United States senior team during the 2014 Winter Olympics. Carlson scored his team's first goal of the tournament in their opening match against Slovakia senior team on February 13, 2014. His goal was scored on his first shot in the tournament, giving him consecutive goals on shots in international play for the United States. In six games during Winter Olympics, Carlson recorded a goal and an assist. The United States entered the semifinals undefeated, but finished in fourth place after being shutout in the bronze medal game by Finland senior team.

On May 27, 2016, Carlson was named to the United States team for the 2016 World Cup of Hockey tournament. He played in all tournament games for Team USA as part of their top defensive pairing. However, Team USA was eliminated early after losing their first two preliminary-round games.

== Personal life ==
On September 6, 2014, Carlson married his long-time girlfriend Gina Nucci. The couple have four children together.

== Career statistics ==
=== Regular season and playoffs ===
| | | | Regular season | | | | | Playoffs |
| Season | Team | League | GP | G | A | Pts | PIM | GP | G | A | Pts | PIM |
|---|---|---|---|---|---|---|---|---|---|---|---|---|
| 2005–06 | New Jersey Rockets | AtJHL | 38 | 2 | 10 | 12 | 42 | — | — | — | — | — |
| 2006–07 | New Jersey Rockets | AtJHL | 44 | 12 | 38 | 50 | 96 | — | — | — | — | — |
| 2006–07 | Indiana Ice | USHL | 2 | 0 | 0 | 0 | 6 | — | — | — | — | — |
| 2007–08 | Indiana Ice | USHL | 59 | 12 | 31 | 43 | 72 | 4 | 1 | 0 | 1 | 0 |
| 2008–09 | London Knights | OHL | 59 | 16 | 60 | 76 | 65 | 14 | 7 | 15 | 22 | 16 |
| 2008–09 | Hershey Bears | AHL | — | — | — | — | — | 16 | 2 | 1 | 3 | 0 |
| 2009–10 | Hershey Bears | AHL | 48 | 4 | 35 | 39 | 26 | 13 | 2 | 5 | 7 | 8 |
| 2009–10 | Washington Capitals | NHL | 22 | 1 | 5 | 6 | 8 | 7 | 1 | 3 | 4 | 0 |
| 2010–11 | Washington Capitals | NHL | 82 | 7 | 30 | 37 | 44 | 9 | 2 | 1 | 3 | 4 |
| 2011–12 | Washington Capitals | NHL | 82 | 9 | 23 | 32 | 22 | 14 | 2 | 3 | 5 | 8 |
| 2012–13 | Washington Capitals | NHL | 48 | 6 | 16 | 22 | 18 | 7 | 0 | 1 | 1 | 4 |
| 2013–14 | Washington Capitals | NHL | 82 | 10 | 27 | 37 | 22 | — | — | — | — | — |
| 2014–15 | Washington Capitals | NHL | 82 | 12 | 43 | 55 | 28 | 14 | 1 | 5 | 6 | 4 |
| 2015–16 | Washington Capitals | NHL | 56 | 8 | 31 | 39 | 14 | 12 | 5 | 7 | 12 | 4 |
| 2016–17 | Washington Capitals | NHL | 72 | 9 | 28 | 37 | 10 | 13 | 2 | 2 | 4 | 4 |
| 2017–18 | Washington Capitals | NHL | 82 | 15 | 53 | 68 | 32 | 24 | 5 | 15 | 20 | 8 |
| 2018–19 | Washington Capitals | NHL | 80 | 13 | 57 | 70 | 34 | 7 | 0 | 5 | 5 | 6 |
| 2019–20 | Washington Capitals | NHL | 69 | 15 | 60 | 75 | 26 | 5 | 0 | 6 | 6 | 2 |
| 2020–21 | Washington Capitals | NHL | 52 | 10 | 34 | 44 | 12 | 5 | 0 | 2 | 2 | 6 |
| 2021–22 | Washington Capitals | NHL | 78 | 17 | 54 | 71 | 20 | 6 | 1 | 4 | 5 | 2 |
| 2022–23 | Washington Capitals | NHL | 40 | 9 | 20 | 29 | 12 | — | — | — | — | — |
| 2023–24 | Washington Capitals | NHL | 82 | 10 | 42 | 52 | 40 | 4 | 1 | 1 | 2 | 2 |
| 2024–25 | Washington Capitals | NHL | 79 | 5 | 46 | 51 | 22 | 10 | 1 | 2 | 3 | 2 |
| 2025–26 | Washington Capitals | NHL | 55 | 10 | 36 | 46 | 26 | — | — | — | — | — |
| 2025–26 | Anaheim Ducks | NHL | 16 | 4 | 10 | 14 | 6 | 12 | 0 | 6 | 6 | 4 |
| NHL totals | | | 1,159 | 170 | 615 | 785 | 396 | 149 | 21 | 63 | 84 | 60 |

=== International ===
| Year | Team | Event | Result | GP | G | A | Pts | PIM |
|---|---|---|---|---|---|---|---|---|
| 2010 | United States | WJC | 1st place, gold medalist(s) | 7 | 4 | 3 | 7 | 4 |
| 2014 | United States | OG | 4th | 6 | 1 | 1 | 2 | 0 |
| 2016 | United States | WCH | 7th | 2 | 0 | 0 | 0 | 0 |
| Junior totals | | | | 7 | 4 | 3 | 7 | 4 |
| Senior totals | | | | 8 | 1 | 1 | 2 | 0 |

== Awards and honors ==
| Award | Year | Ref |
USHL
| Second All-Star team | 2008 | |
| All-Rookie team | 2008 | |
OHL
| First All-Rookie team | 2009 | |
| Second All-Star team | 2009 | |
| CHL All-Rookie team | 2009 | |
AHL
| Calder Cup (Hershey Bears) | 2009, 2010 | |
| AHL All-Star Game | 2010 | |
| All-Rookie team | 2010 | |
NHL
| NHL All-Rookie Team | 2011 | |
| Stanley Cup champion | 2018 | |
| NHL All-Star Game | 2019, 2020 | |
| NHL Second All-Star team | 2019 | |
| NHL First All-Star team | 2020 | |
International
| WJC All-Star Team | 2010 | |

== See also ==
- List of NHL players with 1,000 games played

Awards and achievements
| Preceded by Anton Gustafsson | Washington Capitals first-round draft pick 2008 | Succeeded by Marcus Johansson |
