= Emmental Versicherung Arena =

Ice sports and event centre in Switzerland

Coordinates: 46.9363°N 7.786°E

emmental versicherung arena
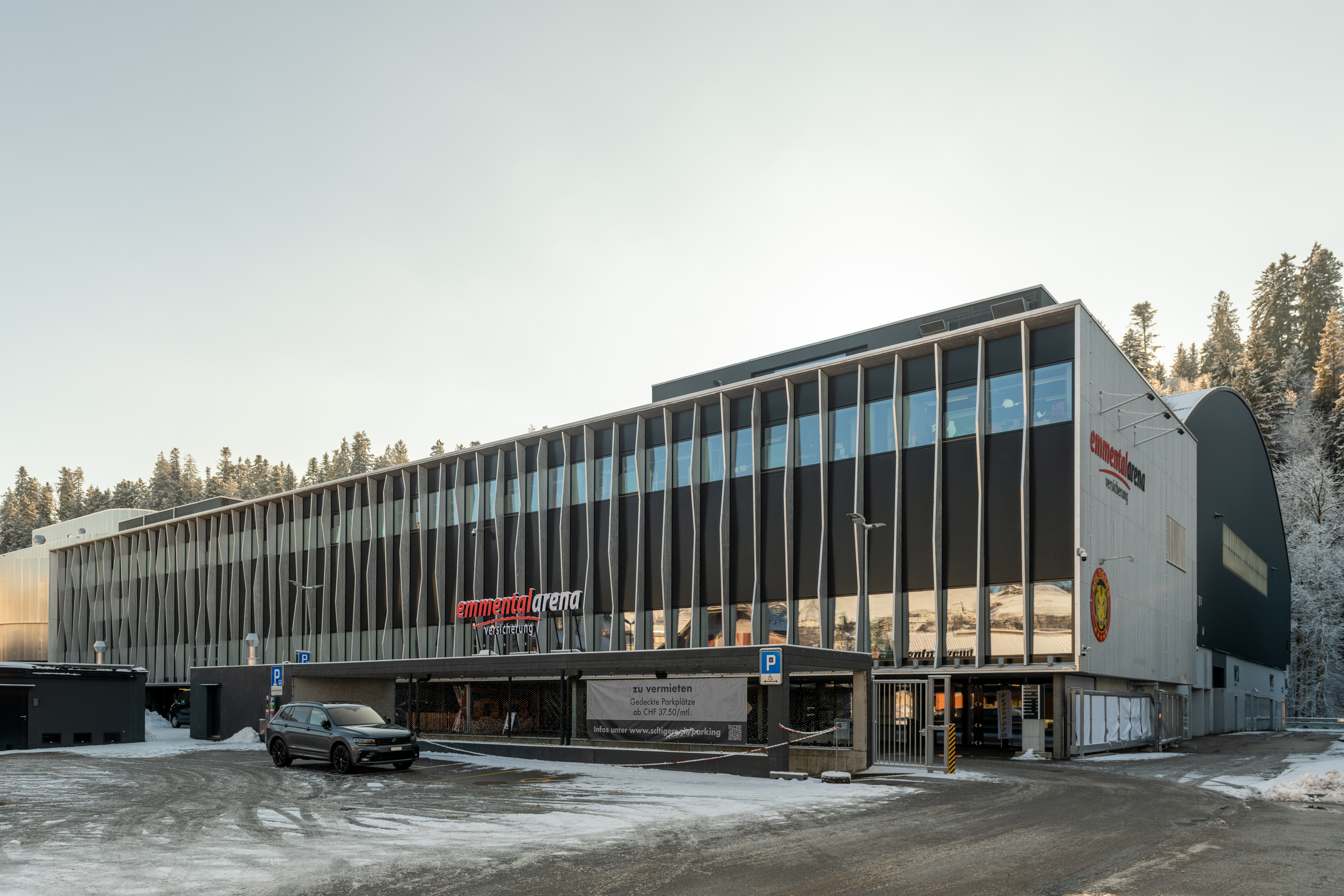
- Interactive map of emmental versicherung arena
- Former names: NEB Oberfeld (1946–1959) KEB Langnau (1959–1975) Ilfishalle (1975–2023)
- Address: Güterstrasse 14; 3550 Langnau im Emmental Canton of Bern; Switzerland
- Owner: Ilfis Stadion AG

Construction
- Opened: 1975
- Renovated: 2012

The Emmental Versicherung Arena (officially written as emmental versicherung arena) is an ice sports and event centre located in the Swiss municipality of Langnau im Emmental, in the canton of Bern. It was completed in 1975. The arena serves as the home venue for the ice hockey club SCL Tigers and has a total seating capacity of 6,050, making it the second-smallest ice rink among all the National League teams. Its original name is derived from the nearby river Ilfis.

== History ==
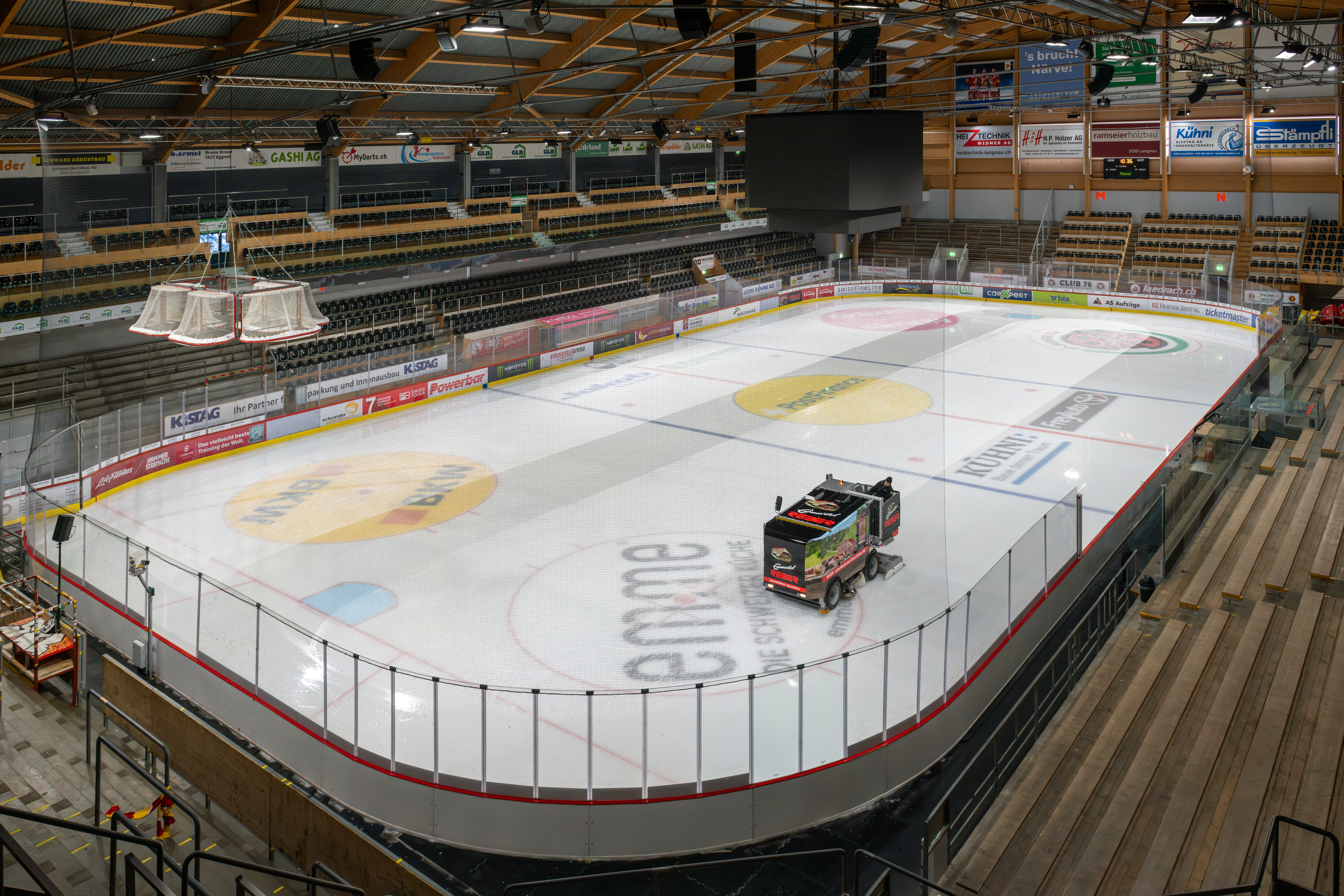
Interior view

The present emmental versicherung arena originated from the Kunsteisbahn Langnau, which was built in 1959. In 1975, the stadium was covered and named Ilfishalle. It underwent renovation in 2012, reducing its seating capacity from 6,300 to 6,050 spectators. The total cost of this construction project exceeded 33 million CHF. Since March 2023, the facility has been supplemented by an extension building featuring a second ice rink, an athletic area, and dining facilities, situated directly adjacent to the arena. Since September 2023, the ice arena has been named emmental versicherung arena, after the emmental versicherung company from Konolfingen.

== Spectators ==
The SCL Tigers have strong roots in the Emmental region's population. The average attendance is around 5,600 spectators per game.
