= 2015–16 National League B season =

- League: National League B
- Sport: Ice hockey
- Duration: September 11, 2015 – February 13, 2016
- Number of games: 45
- Number of teams: 10

Regular Season
- Season Champions: SC Rapperswil-Jona Lakers
- Top scorer: Philip-Michael Devos (HC Ajoie)

Playoffs
- Semi-Final champions: SC Rapperswil-Jona Lakers
- Semi-Final runners-up: HC Red Ice
- Semi-Final champions: HC Ajoie
- Semi-Final runners-up: EHC Olten

Swiss champion NLB
- Champions: HC Ajoie
- Runners-up: SC Rapperswil-Jona Lakers

National League B seasons
- ← 2014–15 2016–17 →

The 2015–16 National League B season was the 69th ice hockey season of Switzerland's second tier hockey league, the National League B.

HC Ajoie went on to win the championship by defeating SC Rapperswil-Jona Lakers in the finals. This title is the team's second in its history since 1992 when they won their first National League B championship.

== Teams ==
National League B teams for the 2015–16 season

| Team | City | Arena | Capacity |
|---|---|---|---|
| HC Ajoie | Porrentruy | Patinoire de Porrentruy | 4,300 |
| HC La Chaux-de-Fonds | La Chaux-de-Fonds | Patinoire des Mélèzes | 7,200 |
| GCK Lions | Küsnacht | Eishalle Küsnacht | 2,200 |
| SC Langenthal | Langenthal | Schoren Halle | 4,320 |
| EHC Olten | Olten | Kleinholz Stadion | 6,500 |
| SC Rapperswil-Jona Lakers | Rapperswil | Diners Club Arena | 6,200 |
| HC Red Ice | Martigny | Forum d'Octodure | 4,500 |
| Hockey Thurgau | Weinfelden | Güttingersreuti | 3,200 |
| EHC Visp | Visp | Litternahalle | 4,300 |
| EHC Winterthur | Winterthur | Eishalle Deutweg | 3,000 |

== Regular season ==
The regular season started on September 11, 2015 and ended on February 13, 2016.

| Pos | Team | Pld | W | OTW | OTL | L | GF | GA | GD | Pts | Qualification |
|---|---|---|---|---|---|---|---|---|---|---|---|
| 1 | SC Rapperswil-Jona Lakers | 45 | 27 | 6 | 2 | 10 | 162 | 105 | +57 | 95 | Advance to Playoffs |
| 2 | SC Langenthal | 45 | 26 | 3 | 6 | 10 | 164 | 122 | +42 | 90 | Advance to Playoffs |
| 3 | EHC Olten | 45 | 22 | 6 | 8 | 9 | 178 | 124 | +54 | 86 | Advance to Playoffs |
| 4 | HC La Chaux-de-Fonds | 45 | 23 | 6 | 2 | 14 | 157 | 125 | +32 | 83 | Advance to Playoffs |
| 5 | HC Ajoie | 45 | 24 | 2 | 2 | 17 | 171 | 131 | +40 | 78 | Advance to Playoffs |
| 6 | EHC Visp | 45 | 18 | 4 | 5 | 18 | 164 | 161 | +3 | 67 | Advance to Playoffs |
| 7 | HC Red Ice | 45 | 17 | 3 | 4 | 21 | 113 | 128 | −15 | 61 | Advance to Playoffs |
| 8 | Hockey Thurgau | 45 | 14 | 4 | 2 | 25 | 124 | 164 | −40 | 52 | Advance to Playoffs |
| 9 | GCK Lions | 45 | 11 | 2 | 2 | 30 | 107 | 183 | −76 | 39 | |
| 10 | EHC Winterthur | 45 | 6 | 1 | 4 | 34 | 99 | 196 | −97 | 24 | |

Updated to match(es) played on 16 February 2016. Source: National League B
Rules for classification: 1) points; 2) a higher number of wins in the regular time; 3) a higher number of wins in overtime and shootouts; 4) goal difference; 5) number of goals scored; 6) drawing of lots.

== Playoffs ==
The playoffs started on February 16, 2016 and ended on April 1, 2016.

Quarter-Finals
1 | SC Rapperswil-Jona Lakers | 4
8 | Hockey Thurgau | 3
2 | SC Langenthal | 2
7 | HC Red Ice | 4
(Pairings are reseeded after the first round)
3 | EHC Olten | 4
6 | EHC Visp | 3
4 | HC La Chaux-de-Fonds | 2
5 | HC Ajoie | 4

Semi-Finals
1 | SC Rapperswil-Jona Lakers | 4
7 | HC Red Ice | 0
3 | EHC Olten | 2
5 | HC Ajoie | 4

Finals
1 | SC Rapperswil-Jona Lakers | 2
5 | HC Ajoie | 4

== League Qualification ==
In League Qualification series HC Ajoie were supposed to play against EHC Biel, but the series were cancelled after HC Ajoie have not handed in their application for a promotion to next year's NLA season.
