= 2015–16 NLA season =

2015–16 National League A season
- League: National League A
- Sport: Ice hockey
- Duration: September 9, 2015 – February 27, 2016
- Games: 50
- Teams: 12

Regular season
- Best Record: ZSC Lions
- Runners-up: HC Davos
- Top scorer: Pierre-Marc Bouchard (EV Zug)

Playoffs
- Semi-Final champions: SC Bern
- Semi-Final runners-up: HC Davos
- Semi-Final champions: HC Lugano
- Semi-Final runners-up: Genève-Servette HC

Swiss champion NLA
- Champions: SC Bern
- Runners-up: HC Lugano

NLA seasons
- ← 2014–15 2016–17 →

The 2015–16 National League A season was the ninth ice hockey season of Switzerland's top hockey league, the National League A. Overall, it was the 78th season of Swiss professional hockey.

SC Bern went on to win the championship by defeating HC Lugano. This title is the team's 14th in its history at the top division of Switzerland's ice hockey championship.

== Teams ==
NLA teams for the 2015–16 season

Team	City	Arena	Capacity
HC Ambrì-Piotta	Ambrì	Valascia	6,500
SC Bern	Bern	PostFinance-Arena	17,031
EHC Biel	Biel/Bienne	Tissot Arena	6,521
HC Davos	Davos	Vaillant Arena	6,800
Fribourg-Gottéron	Fribourg	BCF Arena	6,700
Genève-Servette HC	Geneva	Patinoire des Vernets	7,135
Kloten Flyers	Kloten	Kolping Arena	7,719
Lausanne HC	Lausanne	CIG de Malley	7,600
HC Lugano	Lugano	Pista La Resega	7,800
SCL Tigers	Langnau im Emmental	Ilfis Stadium	6,050
ZSC Lions	Zürich	Hallenstadion	11,200
EV Zug	Zug	Bossard Arena	7,015

== Regular season ==
Pos	Team	Pld	W	OTW	OTL	L	GF	GA	GD	Pts	Qualification
1	ZSC Lions	50	29	2	7	12	173	125	+48	98	Advance to Playoffs
2	HC Davos	50	25	7	2	16	181	142	+39	91	Advance to Playoffs
3	Genève-Servette HC	50	25	6	2	17	160	138	+22	89	Advance to Playoffs
4	EV Zug	50	24	5	6	15	161	138	+23	88	Advance to Playoffs
5	HC Lugano	50	21	6	5	18	157	150	+7	80	Advance to Playoffs
6	Fribourg-Gottéron	50	22	2	5	21	148	154	−6	75	Advance to Playoffs
7	Kloten Flyers	50	20	5	2	23	154	150	+4	72	Advance to Playoffs
8	SC Bern	50	16	5	9	20	152	162	−10	67	Advance to Playoffs
9	Lausanne HC	50	17	6	4	23	123	143	−20	67	Advance to Playouts (Note: Relegation Playoffs)
10	HC Ambrì-Piotta	50	18	2	8	22	144	166	−22	66	Advance to Playouts
11	SCL Tigers	50	14	6	3	27	135	173	−38	57	Advance to Playouts
12	EHC Biel	50	11	6	5	28	128	175	−47	50	Advance to Playouts

Updated to match(es) played on 28 February 2016. Source: NLA
Rules for classification: 1) points; 2) a higher number of wins in the regular time; 3) a higher number of wins in overtime and shootouts; 4) goal difference; 5) number of goals scored; 6) drawing of lots.

== Player statistics ==
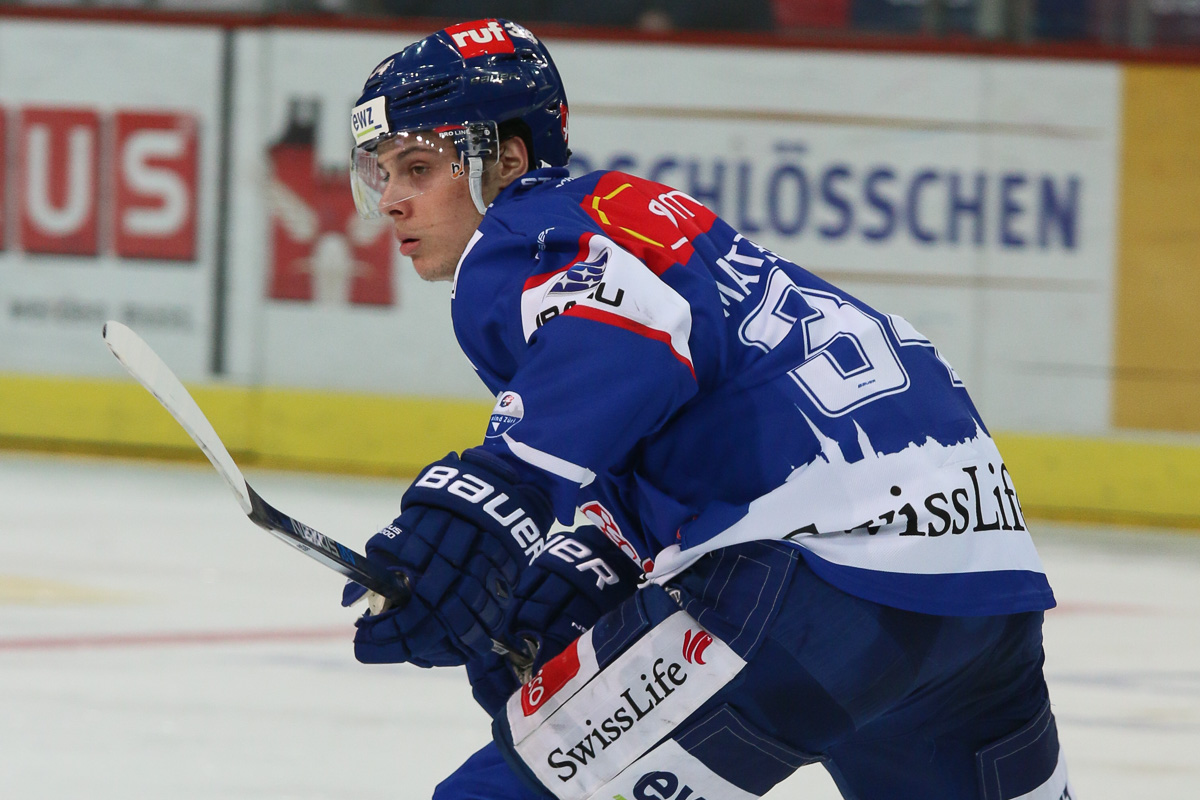
The first overall NHL draft pick (2016) Auston Matthews with the ZSC Lions during the 2015–16 regular season

=== Regular season ===
Player	Team	GP	G	A	Pts	+/–	PIM
Pierre-Marc Bouchard	EV Zug	49	12	55	67	+6	20
Perttu Lindgren	HC Davos	50	22	40	62	+34	20
Lino Martschini	EV Zug	50	26	28	54	+6	6
Cory Conacher	SC Bern	48	22	30	52	0	68
Robert Nilsson	ZSC Lions	48	12	40	52	+22	16
Marc Wieser	HC Davos	50	24	25	49	+24	20
Linus Klasen	HC Lugano	49	14	35	49	+7	18
Fredrik Pettersson	HC Lugano	50	26	22	48	+4	52
Josh Holden	EV Zug	48	18	30	48	+7	20
Auston Matthews	ZSC Lions	36	24	22	46	+16	6

== Playoffs ==
Quarter-Finals
1	ZSC Lions	0
8	SC Bern	4
2	HC Davos	4
7	Kloten Flyers	0
(Pairings are reseeded after the first round)
3	Genève-Servette HC	4
6	Fribourg-Gottéron	1
4	EV Zug	0
5	HC Lugano	4

Semi-Finals
2	HC Davos	1
8	SC Bern	4
3	Genève-Servette HC	2
5	HC Lugano	4

Finals
8	SC Bern	4
5	HC Lugano	1

== Relegation playoffs – Playouts ==
=== 1st round ===
Pos	Team	Pld	W	OTW	OTL	L	GF	GA	GD	Pts
1	Lausanne HC	56	20	6	4	26	140	155	−15	76
2	HC Ambrì-Piotta	56	21	2	8	25	164	188	−24	75
3	EHC Biel	56	16	6	5	29	143	185	−42	65
4	SCL Tigers	56	15	6	3	32	153	199	−46	60

Updated to match(es) played on 28 February 2016. Source: NLA
Rules for classification: 1) points; 2) a higher number of wins in the regular time; 3) a higher number of wins in overtime and shootouts; 4) goal difference; 5) number of goals scored; 6) drawing of lots.

=== 2nd round ===
==== (3) EHC Biel vs. (4) SCL Tigers ====
19 March 2016; 19:45	EHC Biel	6–1 (1–1, 3–0, 2–0)	SCL Tigers	Tissot Arena, Biel/Bienne; Attendance: 5,454

Game reference

S. Rytz, L. Meili
Goalies
D. Ciaccio
Referees:
Andreas Fischer
Marcus Vinnerborg
Linesmen:
Balazs Kovacs
Michael Tscherrig

D. Steiner (A. Huguenin (PP) 7:03	1–0
	1–1	15:50 T. Bucher (C. DiDomenico, K. Clark)
D. Moss (A. Dostoinov, M. Macenauer) (PP) 22:23	2–1
M Dufner (R. Earl) (SH) 29:48	3–1
D. Moss (M. Macenauer, A. Spylo) (PP) 37:54	4–1
R. Herburger (J. Schmutz, R. Earl) 40:13	5–1
J. Schmutz (R. Herburger) 54:06	6–1

34 min
Penalties
44 min
33
Shots
33

22 March 2016; 19:45	SCL Tigers	1–0 (1–0, 0–0, 0–0)	EHC Biel	Ilfis Stadium, Langnau im Emmental; Attendance: 5,377

Game reference
D. Ciaccio	Goalies	L. Meili	Referees: Andreas Koch; Daniel Stricker; Linesmen: Nicolas Fluri; Peter Küng
M. Stettler (Y. Müller, S. Moggi) (PP) 11:31 / 1–0			Referees: Andreas Koch; Daniel Stricker; Linesmen: Nicolas Fluri; Peter Küng
4 min	Penalties	20 min	Referees: Andreas Koch; Daniel Stricker; Linesmen: Nicolas Fluri; Peter Küng
35	Shots	43	Referees: Andreas Koch; Daniel Stricker; Linesmen: Nicolas Fluri; Peter Küng

24 March 2016; 19:45	EHC Biel	3–0 (1–0, 1–0, 1–0)	SCL Tigers	Tissot Arena, Biel/Bienne; Attendance: 6,238

Game reference

L. Meili
Goalies
D. Ciaccio
Referees:
Didier Massy
Marco Prugger
Linesmen:
Nicolas Fluri
Peter Küng

A. Dostoinov (D. Steiner) 1:44	1–0
J. Schmutz (R. Herburger, R. Earl) 24:35	2–0
R. Earl (D. Moss, M. Macenauer) (PP) 42:26	3–0

12 min
Penalties
28 min
46
Shots
15

26 March 2016; 19:45	SCL Tigers	6–5 (0–0, 3–1, 3–4)	EHC Biel	Ilfis Stadium, Langnau im Emmental; Attendance: 6,000

Game reference

D. Ciaccio
Goalies
L. Meili
Referees:
Tobias Wehrli
Marc Wiegand
Linesmen:
Roger Bürgi
Simon Wüst

V. Koistinen (C. DiDomenico, K. Hecquefeuille) (PP) 27:05	1–0
S. Lindemann (E. Chiriaev, L. Haas) 34:00	2–0
K. Hecquefeuille (K. Clark, C. DiDomenico) (PP) 35:09	3–0
	3–1	38:22 M. Macenauer (D. Sutter, D. Moss) (PP)
	3–2	41:11 M. Macenauer (M. Dufner, D. Moss)
Y.-L. Albrecht (K. Clark) 42:27	4–2
	4–3	44:59 R. Earl (D. Moss, M. Macenauer) (PP)
	4–4	48:05 G. Haas (D. Moss, A. Huguenin)
S. Moggi (C. DiDomenico, M. Zryd) 52:13	5–4
L. Haas (E. Chiriaev, S. Wyss)	6–4
	6–5	59:19 G. Haas (R. Earl, M. Macenauer) (PP)

16 min
Penalties
16 min
42
Shots
39

28 March 2016; 16:30	EHC Biel	1–3 (0–1, 1–1, 0–1)	SCL Tigers	Tissot Arena, Biel/Bienne; Attendance: 6,319

Game reference

L. Meili
Goalies
D. Ciaccio
Referees:
Danny Kurmann
Didier Massy
Linesmen:
Balazs Kovacs
Michael Tscherrig

	0–1	3:54 Y.-L. Albrecht (M. Zryd, K. Clark)
24:07 M. Tschantré (D. Moss, (R. Earl) (PP) (24:07)	1–1
	1–2	31:15 T. Nüssli (K. Clark, M. Zryd)
	1–3	59:53 S. Lindemann (S. Wyss, M. Ronchetti) (PP)

12 min
Penalties
16 min
49
Shots
27

31 March 2016; 19:45	SCL Tigers	4–3 OT (2–0, 1–1, 0–2, 1–0)	EHC Biel	Ilfis Stadium, Langnau im Emmental; Attendance: 6,000

Game reference

D. Ciaccio
Goalies
L. Meili
Referees:
Stefan Eichmann
Daniel Stricker
Linesmen:
Roger Bürgi
Simon Wüst

1:50 C. DiDomenico (K. Clark) (PP)	1–0
7:40 T. Nüssli (Y.-L. Albrecht, K. Clark)	2–0
	2–1	26:25 J. Fröhlicher (R. Herburger, R. Earl)
31:03 K. Hecquefeuille (C. DiDomenico, T. Nüssli) (PP)	3–1
	3–2	42:28 R. Herburger (M. Rossi, D. Sutter)
	3–3	58:24 R. Earl (A. Huguenin) (SH)
71:19 T. Bucher (K. Hecquefeuille, C. DiDomenico)	4–3

8 min
Penalties
10 min
38
Shots
45

SCL Tigers won series 4–2

=== 3rd round – League Qualification ===
In League Qualification series EHC Biel were supposed to play against HC Ajoie, who won the 2015–16 National League B playoffs, but the series were cancelled after HC Ajoie have not handed in their application for a promotion to next year's NLA season.
