= 2013–14 National League B season =

- League: National League B
- Sport: Ice hockey
- Duration: September 2013 – February 2014

Regular Season
- Season Champions: EHC Olten

Playoffs

Swiss champion NLB
- Champions: EHC Visp
- Runners-up: SCL Tigers

National League B seasons
- 2012–13 2014–15

The Swiss hockey 2013–14 National League B season was played from September 2013 to February 2014. 10 teams participated in the league, and EHC Visp won the championship.

== Participating teams ==
NLB teams for the 2013-14 season.

== Regular Season Standings ==
	Team	GP	W	L	OTW	OTL	SHW	SHL	Goals	Pts
1.	EHC Olten	45	25	11	3	1	3	2	166:120	90
2.	SCL Tigers	45	25	16	0	0	1	3	139:123	80
3.	SC Langenthal	45	23	15	2	3	2	0	145:125	80
4.	HC Red Ice	45	18	16	3	3	3	2	138:119	71
5.	EHC Visp	45	16	18	1	4	5	1	163:164	65
6.	EHC Basel	45	17	20	2	1	3	2	144:162	64
7.	HC Thurgau	45	15	18	4	4	0	4	144:160	61
8.	HC La Chaux-de-Fonds	45	14	20	3	1	4	3	151:149	60
9.	HC Ajoie	45	14	20	3	4	1	3	123:156	57
10.	GCK Lions	45	10	23	2	2	3	5	113:148	47

== Playoffs ==
Quarterfinals
1	EHC Olten	2
8	HC La Chaux-de-Fonds	4
2	SCL Tigers	4
7	HC Thurgau	0
3	SC Langenthal	4
6	EHC Basel	1
4	HC Red Ice	0
5	EHC Visp	4

Semifinals
2	SCL Tigers	4
8	HC La Chaux-de-Fonds	1
3	SC Langenthal	3
5	EHC Visp	4

Final
2	SCL Tigers	3
5	EHC Visp	4
