= HC Red Ice =

- City: Martigny, Switzerland
- League: Swiss League
- Founded: 1939
- Folded: 2017
- Home arena: Patinoire du Forum d'Octodure
- Website: http://www.hcredice.ch/ (inactive)

HC Red Ice Martigny-Verbier-Entremont was a Swiss ice hockey club based in Martigny, Switzerland.

== History ==
HC Red Ice was founded in 2008 and issued from the fusion of HC Martigny and HC Verbier Val-de-Bagnes. The first team of HC Red Ice was a member of the Swiss League's National League B.

After only three years, HC Red Ice has been involved in the regional final for (Western Switzerland) three times, winning two of them (in 2010 and 2011). During the 2010–2011, HC Red Ice won all 22 matches of the regular league championship before the play-offs phase.

== Relegation and promotion ==
- 1956–74: National League B
- 1983–87: Swiss Division 1 (Promoted)
- 1987–99: National League B (Relegated due to financial reasons)
- 1999–2005: Swiss Division 1 (Promoted)
- 2005–08: National League B (Relegated due to financial reasons)
- 2008–12: Swiss Division 1 (Promoted)
- 2012–17: National League B
- 2017–present: currently inactive. Team filed for bankruptcy on June 14, 2017.

== Retired numbers ==
- #10 – Petr Rosol
- #11 – Igor Fedulov
