= 2020–21 Swiss League season =

- League: Swiss League
- Sport: Ice hockey
- Duration: October 2, 2020 – March 7, 2021
- Number of games: 276
- Number of teams: 12

Regular Season
- Season Champions: EHC Kloten

Playoffs

Swiss League champion
- Champions: HC Ajoie
- Runners-up: EHC Kloten

Swiss League seasons
- ← 2019–20 2021–22 →

The 2020–21 Swiss League season was the 74th season of Switzerland's second tier hockey league.

== Teams ==
Swiss League teams for the 2020–21 season

Team	City	Arena	Capacity
HC Ajoie	Porrentruy	Patinoire de Porrentruy	4,300
Bellinzona Rockets	Biasca	Pista Ghiaccio Biasca	3,800
HC La Chaux-de-Fonds	La Chaux-de-Fonds	Patinoire des Mélèzes	7,200
GCK Lions	Küsnacht	Eishalle Küsnacht	2,800
EHC Kloten	Kloten	Stimo Arena	7,624
SC Langenthal	Langenthal	Schoren Halle	4,320
EHC Olten	Olten	Kleinholz Stadion	6,500
HC Sierre	Sierre	Patinoire de Graben	4,500
Hockey Thurgau	Weinfelden	Güttingersreuti	3,100
EHC Visp	Visp	Lonza Arena	5,150
EHC Winterthur	Winterthur	Zielbau Arena	3,000
EVZ Academy	Zug	Bossard Arena	1,500

== Regular season ==
The regular season started on 2 October 2020 and ended on 7 March 2021.

Pos	Team	Pld	W	OTW	OTL	L	GF	GA	GD	Pts	Qualification
1	EHC Kloten	46	31	3	3	9	199	100	+99	102	Advance to Playoffs
2	HC Ajoie	46	30	6	0	10	202	102	+100	102	Advance to Playoffs
3	SC Langenthal	46	27	5	2	12	167	127	+40	93	Advance to Playoffs
4	HC Sierre	46	23	4	4	15	162	138	+24	81	Advance to Playoffs
5	EHC Olten	46	19	4	4	19	145	126	+19	69	Advance to Playoffs
6	Hockey Thurgau	46	18	5	4	19	120	130	−10	68	Advance to Playoffs
7	EHC Visp	46	18	4	4	20	145	155	−10	66	Advance to Pre-Playoffs
8	HC La Chaux-de-Fonds	46	18	2	7	19	139	146	−7	65	Advance to Pre-Playoffs
9	GCK Lions	46	15	4	3	24	127	160	−33	56	Advance to Pre-Playoffs
10	Bellinzona Rockets	46	13	2	8	23	100	145	−45	51	Advance to Pre-Playoffs
11	EVZ Academy	46	8	7	5	26	104	172	−68	43	
12	EHC Winterthur	46	7	3	5	31	99	208	−109	32	

Source: Swiss League
Rules for classification: 1) points; 2) a higher number of wins in the regular time; 3) a higher number of wins in overtime and shootouts; 4) goal difference; 5) number of goals scored; 6) drawing of lots.

=== Statistics ===
==== Scoring leaders ====
The following shows the top ten players who led the league in points, at the conclusion of the regular season. If two or more skaters are tied (i.e. same number of points, goals and played games), all of the tied skaters are shown.

Player	Team	GP	G	A	Pts	+/–	PIM
(Canada) Jonathan Hazen	HC Ajoie	46	41	40	81	+36	38
(Canada) Philip-Michaël Devos	HC Ajoie	46	27	52	79	+39	20
(Canada) Guillaume Asselin	HC Sierre	43	25	41	66	+33	76
(Switzerland) Arnaud Montandon	HC Sierre	46	36	28	64	+32	40
(Canada) Éric Faille	EHC Kloten	46	16	46	62	+26	12
(Sweden) Robin Figren	EHC Kloten	46	29	31	60	+27	30
(Canada) Garry Nunn	EHC Olten	46	26	33	59	+16	30
(United States) Tim Coffman	HC La Chaux-de-Fonds	39	21	32	53	+5	10
(Finland) Eero Elo	SC Langenthal	46	23	28	51	+17	38
(Canada) Riley Brace	EHC Winterthur	41	18	32	50	-26	50

==== Leading goaltenders ====
The following shows the top five goaltenders who led the league in goals against average, provided that they have played at least 40% of their team's minutes, at the conclusion of the regular season.

Player	Team(s)	GP	TOI	GA	Sv%	GAA
(Switzerland) Dominic Nyffeler	EHC Kloten	38	2179:52	71	92.98	1.95
(Switzerland) Tim Wolf	HC Ajoie	31	1864:08	65	93.04	2.09
(Switzerland) Pascal Caminada	SC Langenthal	33	1899:32	78	91.55	2.46
(Switzerland) Silas Matthys	EHC Olten	29	1693:46	77	90.75	2.73
(Switzerland) Nicola Aeberhard	Hockey Thurgau	28	1604:14	76	91.01	2.84

== Playoffs ==
=== Bracket ===
Pre-playoffs (best-of-3)
7	EHC Visp	2
10	Bellinzona Rockets	0
8	HC La Chaux-de-Fonds	2
9	GCK Lions	1

Quarter-finals (best-of-7)
1	EHC Kloten	4
8	HC La Chaux-de-Fonds	1
2	HC Ajoie	4
7	EHC Visp	0
3	SC Langenthal	4
6	Hockey Thurgau	2
4	HC Sierre	0
5	EHC Olten	4

Semi-finals (best-of-7)
1	EHC Kloten	4
5	EHC Olten	2
(Pairings are re-seeded after the first and second round)
2	HC Ajoie	4
3	SC Langenthal	2

Finals (best-of-7)
1	EHC Kloten	2
2	HC Ajoie	4

=== Pre-playoffs ===
==== (7) EHC Visp vs. (10) Bellinzona Rockets ====
10 March	EHC Visp	4-1	Bellinzona Rockets	Lonza Arena, Visp	Recap
Brügger (Riatsch, Haberstich) - 10:52		First period	No scoring
Josephs (Van Guilder, Wiedmer) - 0:12; Josephs (Heynen) (SH1) - 8:03		Second period	No scoring
Haberstich (Riatsch, Brügger) (PP1) - 11:27		Third period	7:51 - Lauper (Vedova, Dufey)
Reto Lory ( 23 saves / 24 shots )		Goalie stats	Viktor Östlund ( 26 saves / 30 shots )

12 March	Bellinzona Rockets	1-4	EHC Visp	Pista Ghiaccio Biasca, Biasca	Recap
10:06 - Romanenghi (Bionda )		First period	Ritz (Burgener, Blaser) - 11:14
No scoring		Second period	Josephs (Brügger, Steiner) (PP1) - 9:52; Van Guilder (Riatsch, Steiner) - 17:21
No scoring		Third period	Holdener (Josephs, Pilet) (EN) - 18:39
Viktor Östlund ( 29 saves / 32 shots )		Goalie stats	Reto Lory ( 21 saves / 22 shots )

EHC Visp won the series 2–0

==== (8) HC La Chaux-de-Fonds vs. (9) GCK Lions ====
10 March	HC La Chaux-de-Fonds	4-1	GCK Lions	Patinoire des Mélèzes, La Chaux-de-Fonds	Recap
Carbis (Sointu) - 6:06		First period	No scoring
No scoring		Second period	No scoring
Ulmer (Carbis, Achermann) (PP2) - 1:14; Achermann (Stampfli, Kohler) - 8:46; Hasani (Bogdanoff) - 14:52		Third period	13:26 - Simic (Büsser, Casutt) (PP1)
Matteo Ritz ( 28 saves / 29 shots )		Goalie stats	Jeffrey Meier ( 46 saves / 50 shots )

12 March	GCK Lions	7-3	HC La Chaux-de-Fonds	Eishalle Küsnacht, Küsnacht	Recap
1:59 - Simic (Büsser, Landolt); 17:10 - Rautiainen (Capaul, Mettler) (PP1)		First period	No scoring
1:01 - Schlagenhauf (Hayes, Büsser) (PP1); 5:22 - Brüschweiler (Andersson, Casutt); 13:49 - Riedi (Hayes); 15:26 - Brüschweiler (Rautiainen, Mettler) (PP1)		Second period	No scoring
5:27 - Casutt (Büsser, Simic) (PP1)		Third period	Volejnicek (Kohler, Kühni) - 1:51; Bogdanoff (Iglesias, Delémont) - 6:02; Carbis (Stampfli, Sointu) (PP1) - 15:22
Robin Zumbühl ( 39 saves / 42 shots )		Goalie stats	Matteo Ritz ( 23 saves / 27 shots ) Stéphane Charlin ( 10 saves / 13 shots )

14 March	HC La Chaux-de-Fonds	4-2	GCK Lions	Patinoire des Mélèzes, La Chaux-de-Fonds	Recap
Bogdanoff (Hasani) - 1:08; Privet (Hasani, Jaquet) - 5:56		First period	17:49 - Rautiainen
No scoring		Second period	No scoring
Stampfli (Privet, Hasani) (PP1) - 5:40; Sointu (Carbis, Trettenes ) (EN) - 18:30		Third period	1:54 - Rautiainen (Simic, Burger)
Stéphane Charlin ( 21 saves / 23 shots )		Goalie stats	Robin Zumbühl ( 40 saves / 43 shots )

HC La Chaux-de-Fonds won the series 2–1

=== Quarter-Finals ===
==== (1) EHC Kloten vs. (8) HC La Chaux-de-Fonds ====
17 March	EHC Kloten	5-4	HC La Chaux-de-Fonds	Stimo Arena, Kloten	Recap
Obrist (Spiller, Füglister) - 2:17; Spiller (Marchon, Nyffeler) - 6:04; Knellwolf (Faille, Figren) (PP1) - 13:37		First period	9:22 - Cavalleri (Volejnicek, Iglesias); 17:33 - Sointu (Trettenes)
Faille (Figren) - 5:04; Meyer (Spiller, Seiler) - 18:10		Second period	7:30 - Matewa (Kühni, Privet)
No scoring		Third period	11:32 - Carbis (Trettenes, Matewa) (PP1)
Dominic Nyffeler ( 25 saves / 29 shots )		Goalie stats	Stéphane Charlin ( 24 saves / 29 shots )

19 March	HC La Chaux-de-Fonds	0-4	EHC Kloten	Patinoire des Mélèzes, La Chaux-de-Fonds	Recap
No scoring		First period	No scoring
No scoring		Second period	12:32 - Figren (Marchon, Altorfer)
No scoring		Third period	11:39 - Obrist; 16:05 - Obrist (EN); 18:08 - Kindschi (Faille) (PP2)
Matteo Ritz ( 32 saves / 35 shots )		Goalie stats	Dominic Nyffeler ( 38 saves / 38 shots )

21 March	EHC Kloten	7-1	HC La Chaux-de-Fonds	Stimo Arena, Kloten	Recap
No scoring		First period	11:45 - Bouchareb
Knellwolf (Forget, Faille) - 6:10; Kellenberger (Meyer, Spiller) - 6:29; Šimek (Füglister, Obrist) - 10:40; Figren (Altorfer, Marchon) - 11:18; Marchon (Altorfer, Figren) - 14:09; Altorfer (Marchon, Spiller) - 17:22		Second period	No scoring
Obrist (Back, Steiner) - 16:08		Third period	No scoring
Dominic Nyffeler ( 17 saves / 18 shots )		Goalie stats	Stéphane Charlin ( 15 saves / 19 shots ) Matteo Ritz ( 13 saves / 16 shots )

23 March	HC La Chaux-de-Fonds	5-4	OT	EHC Kloten	Patinoire des Mélèzes, La Chaux-de-Fonds	Recap
4:28 - Volejnicek (Achermann)		First period		No scoring
4:36 - Privet (Hasani, Stampfli) (PP1); 14:30 - Achermann (Trettenes, Matewa) (PP1)		Second period		Marchon (Forget, Figren) - 0:52; Spiller (Altorfer, Oejdemark) (PP1) - 7:04
12:33 - Hasani (Stampfli, Bogdanoff) (PP1)		Third period		Spiller - 14:18; Altorfer (Marchon) - 15:41
4:14 - Achermann (Carbis)		First overtime period		No scoring
Matteo Ritz ( 39 saves / 43 shots )		Goalie stats		Dominic Nyffeler ( 32 saves / 37 shots )

25 March	EHC Kloten	8-0	HC La Chaux-de-Fonds	Stimo Arena, Kloten	Recap
Spiller (Meyer, Oejdemark) (PP1) - 7:51		First period	No scoring
Knellwolf (Leone, Füglister) - 9:49; Meyer - 12:10; Altorfer (Spiller, Meyer) (PP1) - 14:48; Janett (Altorfer, Figren) - 16:54; Kellenberger (Meyer, Spiller) - 18:49		Second period	No scoring
Oejdemark (Spiller, Altorfer) (PP1) - 9:08; Kindschi (Faille, Marchon) (PP1) - 10:19		Third period	No scoring
Dominic Nyffeler ( 24 saves / 24 shots )		Goalie stats	Matteo Ritz ( 35 saves / 43 shots )

EHC Kloten won the series 4–1

==== (2) HC Ajoie vs. (7) EHC Visp ====
17 March	HC Ajoie	2-1	EHC Visp	Patinoire de Porrentruy, Porrentruy	Recap
No scoring		First period	No scoring
Devos (Schmutz) - 16:14		Second period	2:00 - Josephs (Van Guilder, Holdener) (PP1)
Frossard (Muller, Eigenmann) (PP1) - 10:11		Third period	No scoring
Tim Wolf ( 38 saves / 39 shots )		Goalie stats	Reto Lory ( 35 saves / 37 shots )

19 March	EHC Visp	2-5	HC Ajoie	Lonza Arena, Visp	Recap
No scoring		First period	Schmutz (Devos, Hauert) (PP1) - 15:14
1:38 - Josephs (Steiner, Van Guilder) (PP1); 7:27 - Furrer (Ritz, Haas)		Second period	No scoring
No scoring		Third period	Hazen (Schmutz, Aebischer) - 10:28; Frei (Hauert, Rouiller) - 13:26; Mäder (EN) - 18:16; Schmutz (EN) - 19:01
Reto Lory ( 33 saves / 36 shots )		Goalie stats	Tim Wolf ( 33 saves / 35 shots )

21 March	HC Ajoie	7-0	EHC Visp	Patinoire de Porrentruy, Porrentruy	Recap
Devos (Pouilly, Schmutz) - 5:59; Schnegg (Mäder, Huber) - 8:15; Frossard (Frei, Joggi) - 10:47		First period	No scoring
Frossard (Devos, Rouiller) (PP2) - 0:20; Hazen (Joggi, Devos) - 2:05; Frei (Frossard, Pouilly) - 18:58; Huber (Pouilly, Birbaum) - 19:15		Second period	No scoring
No scoring		Third period	No scoring
Tim Wolf ( 30 saves / 30 shots )		Goalie stats	Reto Lory ( 12 saves / 17 shots ) Dennis Saikkonen ( 15 saves / 17 shots )

23 March	EHC Visp	1-3	HC Ajoie	Lonza Arena, Visp	Recap
No scoring		First period	No scoring
17:29 - Eigenmann (Frossard, Devos) (PP1)		Second period	Haas (Van Guilder, Wiedmer) (PP1) - 9:35
No scoring		Third period	Huber (Joggi, Aebischer) - 11:27; Schmutz (Huber) (EN) - 19:08
Reto Lory ( 24 saves / 26 shots )		Goalie stats	Tim Wolf ( 47 saves / 48 shots )

HC Ajoie won the series 4–0

==== (3) SC Langenthal vs. (6) Hockey Thurgau ====
17 March	SC Langenthal	2-0	Hockey Thurgau	Schoren Halle, Langenthal	Recap
Kläy (Himelfarb, Christen) (PP1) - 5:28		First period	No scoring
Küng (SH1) - 16:55		Second period	No scoring
No scoring		Third period	No scoring
Pascal Caminada ( 23 saves / 23 shots )		Goalie stats	Nicola Aeberhard ( 21 saves / 23 shots )

19 March	Hockey Thurgau	3-5	SC Langenthal	Güttingersreuti, Weinfelden	Recap
14:10 - Spannring (Wetli, Brändli)		First period	Himelfarb (Christen, Rüegsegger) - 15:40
4:18 - Mosimann (Loosli, Schmutz); 19:57 - Brennan (Rehak, Scheidegger)		Second period	Nyffeler (Pienitz, Christen) - 3:22; Elo (Müller, Torquato) (PP1) - 6:41; Kummer - 9:31
No scoring		Third period	Torquato (Kläy, Küng) - 12:09
Nicola Aeberhard ( 24 saves / 29 shots )		Goalie stats	Pascal Caminada ( 31 saves / 34 shots )

21 March	SC Langenthal	2-3	Hockey Thurgau	Schoren Halle, Langenthal	Recap
Kämpf (Himelfarb, Christen) (PP1) - 16:41		First period	No scoring
Elo (Müller, Torquato) (PP1) - 3:01		Second period	9:27 - Rundqvist (Scheidegger, Brennan) (PP1)
No scoring		Third period	10:15 - Mosimann (Rundqvist); 19:33 - Brennan (Scheidegger, Ang) (PP1)
Pascal Caminada ( 27 saves / 30 shots )		Goalie stats	Nicola Aeberhard ( 26 saves / 28 shots )

23 March	Hockey Thurgau	1-2	SC Langenthal	Güttingersreuti, Weinfelden	Recap
14:22 - Mosimann (Loosli, Rundqvist)		First period	No scoring
No scoring		Second period	Elo (Torquato, Müller) (PP1) - 16:17
No scoring		Third period	Kummer - 0:41
Nicola Aeberhard ( 14 saves / 16 shots )		Goalie stats	Pascal Caminada ( 19 saves / 20 shots )

25 March	SC Langenthal	2-3	3OT	Hockey Thurgau	Schoren Halle, Langenthal	Recap
Küng (Kummer, Maret) - 9:32		First period		No scoring
No scoring		Second period		No scoring
Kummer (Elo) (SH1) - 59:00		Third period		0:31 - Spannring; 17:35 - Rundqvist (Mosimann)
No scoring		Third overtime period		40:26 - Ang (Brennan, Brändli)
Pascal Caminada ( 29 saves / 32 shots )		Goalie stats		Nicola Aeberhard ( 52 saves / 54 shots )

28 March	Hockey Thurgau	1-3	SC Langenthal	Güttingersreuti, Weinfelden	Recap
No scoring		First period	Dähler (Himelfarb, Büsser) - 8:32
12:33 - Spannring (Fritsche, Scheidegger)		Second period	No scoring
No scoring		Third period	Kämpf (Müller, Kummer) - 12:30; Kummer (EN) - 19:19
Nicola Aeberhard ( 27 saves / 29 shots )		Goalie stats	Pascal Caminada ( 21 saves / 22 shots )

SC Langenthal won the series 4–2

==== (4) HC Sierre vs. (5) EHC Olten ====
17 March	HC Sierre	0-4	EHC Olten	Patinoire de Graben, Sierre	Recap
No scoring		First period	14:29 - Nunn (Knelsen, McTavish)
No scoring		Second period	No scoring
No scoring		Third period	7:19 - Fuhrer (Othmann, Fogstad Vold); 10:01 - Othmann (Rytz, Weisskopf) (PP1); 15:34 - Nunn (Knelsen, McTavish)
Remo Giovannini ( 37 saves / 41 shots )		Goalie stats	Silas Matthys ( 32 saves / 32 shots )

19 March	EHC Olten	3-2	HC Sierre	Kleinholz Stadion, Olten	Recap
No scoring		First period	No scoring
3:04 - Knelsen (Nunn, McTavish) (PP2)		Second period	Bernazzi (M. Montandon, Castonguay) - 11:00
1:13 - Horanský (Wyss); 16:47 - Nunn (McTavish)		Third period	Monnet (Castonguay, M. Montandon) - 10:05
Silas Matthys ( 25 saves / 27 shots )		Goalie stats	Remo Giovannini ( 27 saves / 30 shots )

21 March	HC Sierre	1-5	EHC Olten	Patinoire de Graben, Sierre	Recap
Monnet (Bezina, Rimann) (PP1) - 8:54		First period	14:23 - Lüthi (Chiriaev, Knelsen) (PP2); 14:43 - Chiriaev (Knelsen, Nunn) (PP1)
No scoring		Second period	14:27 - Knelsen (Chiriaev, Nunn) (PP1)
No scoring		Third period	9:32 - McTavish (Nunn); 13:56 - McTavish (Nunn, Knelsen) (PP2)
Remo Giovannini ( 38 saves / 43 shots )		Goalie stats	Silas Matthys ( 23 saves / 24 shots )

23 March	EHC Olten	6-5	2OT	HC Sierre	Kleinholz Stadion, Olten	Recap
3:46 - Rimann (Castonguay, Dolana); 13:08 - Surdez (Bernazzi, Jolliet); 18:27 - Bezina (Monnet, Rimann)		First period		Schwarzenbach (Chiriaev) - 1:22
9:40 - A. Montandon (Castonguay, M. Montandon) (PP1)		Second period		Lüthi (Nunn, McTavish) - 6:03
18:54 - Dolana (Dozin, A. Montandon)		Third period		Knelsen - 8:56; Lüthi (Nunn, Knelsen) - 13:27; Knelsen (Nunn) - 15:46
No scoring		Second overtime period		Knelsen (Nunn, Horanský) - 28:42
Silas Matthys ( 26 saves / 31 shots )		Goalie stats		Remo Giovannini ( 57 saves / 63 shots )

EHC Olten won the series 4–0

=== Semi-Finals ===
==== (1) EHC Kloten vs. (5) EHC Olten ====
3 April	EHC Kloten	6-2	EHC Olten	Stimo Arena, Kloten	Recap
Spiller (Oejdemark, Marchon) (PP1) - 3:48; Figren (Bartholet, Forget) - 5:13; Meyer (Spiller) - 18:38; Back (Forget, Faille) - 19:36		First period	4:43 - Knelsen (Horanský, Nunn) (PP1); 9:45 - Horanský (Chiriaev, Knelsen) (PP1)
Leone (Gähler, Obrist) - 11:51		Second period	No scoring
Faille (Forget, Knellwolf) (PP1) - 6:49		Third period	No scoring
Dominic Nyffeler ( 35 saves / 37 shots )		Goalie stats	Silas Matthys ( 9 saves / 13 shots ) Simon Rytz ( 16 saves / 18 shots )

6 April	EHC Olten	0-1	EHC Kloten	Kleinholz Stadion, Olten	Recap
No scoring		First period	No scoring
No scoring		Second period	Figren (Forget) - 7:11
No scoring		Third period	No scoring
Simon Rytz ( 24 saves / 25 shots )		Goalie stats	Dominic Nyffeler ( 36 saves / 36 shots )

8 April	EHC Kloten	5-2	EHC Olten	Stimo Arena, Kloten	Recap
Figren (Faille, Forget) (PP1) - 15:40		First period	7:47 - Chiriaev (Weisskopf, Elsener)
Forget (Figren, Faille) (PP1) - 6:22; Faille (Figren) (SH1) - 9:32		Second period	No scoring
Forget (Figren, Gähler) (PP1) - 2:28; Marchon (EN) - 19:58		Third period	1:42 - Lüthi (Nunn, Knelsen) (SH1)
Dominic Nyffeler ( 44 saves / 46 shots )		Goalie stats	Simon Rytz ( 34 saves / 38 shots )

10 April	EHC Olten	6-3	EHC Kloten	Kleinholz Stadion, Olten	Recap
4:32 - Nunn (Lüthi, Chiriaev) (PP1); 16:40 - Fogstad Vold (Schwab, Weder)		First period	Forget (Figren, Marchon) - 9:41; Figren (Kellenberger) (SH1) - 15:34; Kellenberger - 18:42
3:37 - Horanský (Knelsen, Elsener); 10:39 - Fuhrer (Fogstad Vold, Weisskopf)		Second period	No scoring
2:40 - Horanský (Nunn, P. Rytz); 18:49 - Chiriaev (Horanský, Weisskopf) (SH1, EN)		Third period	No scoring
Simon Rytz ( 39 saves / 42 shots )		Goalie stats	Dominic Nyffeler ( 35 saves / 40 shots )

12 April	EHC Kloten	2-4	EHC Olten	Stimo Arena, Kloten
Altorfer (Spiller, Oejdemark) - 16:38		First period	2:00 - Weder (SH1); 12:01 - Schwab (P. Rytz, S. Rytz)
No scoring		Second period	1:39 - P. Rytz (Nunn, Horanský) (PP2)
Knellwolf (Faille) (PP1) - 18:50		Third period	19:43 - Nunn (Horanský, Knelsen) (EN)
Dominic Nyffeler ( 29 saves / 32 shots )		Goalie stats	Simon Rytz ( 29 saves / 31 shots )

14 April	EHC Olten	0-2	EHC Kloten	Kleinholz Stadion, Olten	Recap
No scoring		First period	No scoring
No scoring		Second period	No scoring
No scoring		Third period	Altorfer (Oejdemark) - 0:23; Obrist (Šimek) - 19:46 (EN)
Simon Rytz ( 33 saves / 34 shots )		Goalie stats	Dominic Nyffeler ( 24 saves / 24 shots )

EHC Kloten won the series 4–2

==== (2) HC Ajoie vs. (3) SC Langenthal ====
3 April	HC Ajoie	4-5	SC Langenthal	Patinoire de Porrentruy, Porrentruy	Recap
Schmutz (Hazen, Devos) - 0:22		First period	5:34 - Tschannen (Küng, Torquato); 9:28 - Kummer (Müller); 12:07 - Tschannen (Higgins, Dähler)
Frei (Schnegg, Frossard) - 2:08; Frei (Devos, Pouilly) - 19:59		Second period	12:49 - Elo (Kummer, Büsser)
Rouiller (Devos, Schmutz) (PP1) - 18:52		Third period	11:21 - Küng (Tschannen, Torquato)
Tim Wolf ( 23 saves / 28 shots )		Goalie stats	Pascal Caminada ( 31 saves / 35 shots )

6 April	SC Langenthal	3-5	HC Ajoie	Schoren Halle, Langenthal	Recap
9:56 - Kämpf (Kummer, Elo)		First period	Hazen - 0:27; Huber (Rouiller) - 9:42; Schmutz (Hazen, Devos) - 18:28
7:06 - Tschannen (Torquato, Christen)		Second period	Hazen (Devos) - 19:47
13:01 - Maret (Elo, Kummer)		Third period	Schmutz (Hazen, Eigenmann) (EN) - 19:44
Pascal Caminada ( 37 saves / 41 shots )		Goalie stats	Tim Wolf ( 38 saves / 41 shots )

8 April	HC Ajoie	4-0	SC Langenthal	Patinoire de Porrentruy, Porrentruy	Recap
Schmutz (Devos, Joggi) (PP1) - 5:15; Schmutz (Hazen) - 8:52		First period	No scoring
Devos (Hazen, Hauert) (PP1) - 9:33		Second period	No scoring
Hazen (Devos) - 0:07		Third period	No scoring
Tim Wolf ( 32 saves / 32 shots )		Goalie stats	Pascal Caminada ( 34 saves / 38 shots )

10 April	SC Langenthal	2-6	HC Ajoie	Schoren Halle, Langenthal	Recap
No scoring		First period	No scoring
16:03 - Elo (Büsser, Kummer) (PP1)		Second period	Roberts (Frossard) - 2:26; Devos (Pouilly, Schmutz) - 4:48; Devos (Hazen, Birbaum) - 11:59
7:48 - Derungs		Third period	Schmutz (Aebischer, Hazen) - 6:45; Rouiller (Frossard, Hauert) (PP1) - 15:13; Devos (Birbaum, Wolf) (EN) - 18:27
Pascal Caminada ( 16 saves / 19 shots ) Andri Henauer ( 17 saves / 19 shots )		Goalie stats	Tim Wolf ( 37 saves / 39 shots )

12 April	HC Ajoie	2-4	SC Langenthal	Patinoire de Porrentruy, Porrentruy	Recap
Frossard (Hauert, Rouiller) - 4:28; Huber (Mäder, Joggi) - 6:52		First period	5:10 - Schläpfer (Kläy, Gerber)
No scoring		Second period	7:21 - Küng (Müller, Kämpf); 18:17 - Himelfarb (Tschannen, Elo); 19:41 - Kläy (Kummer, Müller)
No scoring		Third period	No scoring
Tim Wolf ( 30 saves / 34 shots )		Goalie stats	Pascal Caminada ( 33 saves / 35 shots )

14 April	SC Langenthal	1-5	HC Ajoie	Schoren Halle, Langenthal	Recap
11:08 - Küng (Tschannen, Elo) (PP1)		First period	Schmutz (Eigenmann, Devos) (PP1) - 13:55
No scoring		Second period	Macquat (Schnegg) - 7:17; Frossard (Frei, Hauert) - 8:33
No scoring		Third period	Schnegg (Macquat, Eigenmann) - 11:23; Schmutz (Devos, Joggi) (EN) - 16:37
Pascal Caminada ( 21 saves / 25 shots )		Goalie stats	Tim Wolf ( 30 saves / 31 shots )

HC Ajoie won the series 4–2

=== Finals ===
18 April	EHC Kloten	5-2	HC Ajoie	Stimo Arena, Kloten	Recap
Frossard (Frei, Huber) - 1:08; Schmutz (Devos, Eigenmann) (PP1) - 7:55		First period	3:48 - Füglister; 5:45 - Gähler (Spiller, Knellwolf)
Meyer (Kindschi, Šimek) - 0:47; Figren (Kindschi, Ganz) - 24:52		Second period	No scoring
Faille (Kindschi) (EN) - 19:20		Third period	No scoring
Dominic Nyffeler ( 19 saves / 21 shots )		Goalie stats	Tim Wolf ( 24 saves / 28 shots )

20 April	HC Ajoie	5-0	EHC Kloten	Patinoire de Porrentruy, Porrentruy	Recap
9:02 - Frossard (Frei); 14:09 - Huber (Frossard, Eigenmann)		First period	No scoring
4:07 - Devos (Birbaum); 39:40 - Hazen (Schmutz) (PP1)		Second period	No scoring
12:04 - Devos (Frossard, Rouiller) (PP2)		Third period	No scoring
Tim Wolf ( 37 saves / 37 shots )		Goalie stats	Dominic Nyffeler ( 26 saves / 31 shots )

22 April	EHC Kloten	2-0	HC Ajoie	Stimo Arena, Kloten	Recap
No scoring		First period	No scoring
No scoring		Second period	Spiller (Meyer, Faille) - 9:43; Altorfer (Forget, Ganz) - 12:35
No scoring		Third period	No scoring
Dominic Nyffeler ( 19 saves / 19 shots )		Goalie stats	Tim Wolf ( 25 saves / 27 shots )

24 April	HC Ajoie	4-0	EHC Kloten	Patinoire de Porrentruy, Porrentruy	Recap
9:39 - Schnegg (Muller, Macquat)		First period	No scoring
No scoring		Second period	No scoring
0:42 - Devos (Hazen, Schmutz); 9:19 - Macquat (Frossard, Birbaum) (SH1); 11:26 - Huber (Frossard, Aebischer)		Third period	No scoring
Tim Wolf ( 25 saves / 25 shots )		Goalie stats	Dominic Nyffeler ( 30 saves / 34 shots )

26 April	EHC Kloten	2-4	HC Ajoie	Stimo Arena, Kloten	Recap
No scoring		First period	19:26 - Schmutz (Devos, Eigenmann) (PP1); 19:40 - Frei (Hauert)
Spiller (Altorfer) - 18:31		Second period	14:22 - Schmutz (Eigenmann, Devos) (PP1)
Meyer (Altorfer, Spiller) - 4:03		Third period	19:44 - Schmutz (SH1, EN)
Dominic Nyffeler ( 28 saves / 31 shots )		Goalie stats	Tim Wolf ( 35 saves / 37 shots )

28 April	HC Ajoie	5-4	OT	EHC Kloten	Patinoire de Porrentruy, Porrentruy	Recap
8:24 - Frossard (Frei, Birbaum); 9:48 - Devos (Hazen, Schnegg)		First period		Steiner (Marchon) - 1:17
9:38 - Devos (Rouiller, Hazen) (PP1); 12:59 - Hazen (Hauert, Devos)		Second period		Spiller (Altorfer, Kindschi) (PP1) - 1:34; Altorfer (Faille) - 3:58; Figren (SH1, PS) - 8:17
No scoring		Third period		No scoring
7:17 - Joggi (Huber, Frossard)		First overtime period		No scoring
Tim Wolf ( 37 saves / 41 shots )		Goalie stats		Dominic Nyffeler ( 22 saves / 27 shots )

EHC Kloten won the series 4–2
