= 2014–15 NLA season =

2014–15 National League A season
- League: National League A
- Sport: Ice hockey
- Duration: September 20, 2014 – 2015
- Number of games: 50
- Number of teams: 12

Regular Season
- Best Record: ZSC Lions
- Runners-up: SC Bern
- Top scorer: Fredrik Pettersson (HC Lugano)

Playoffs
- Semi-Final champions: ZSC Lions
- Semi-Final runners-up: Genève-Servette HC
- Semi-Final champions: HC Davos
- Semi-Final runners-up: SC Bern

Swiss champion NLA
- Champions: HC Davos
- Runners-up: ZSC Lions

NLA seasons
- ← 2013–14 2015–16 →

The 2014–15 National League A season was the eighth ice hockey season of Switzerland's top hockey league, the National League A. Overall, it is the 77th season of Swiss professional hockey.

== Teams ==
NLA teams for the 2013–14 season

Team	City	Arena	Capacity
HC Ambrì-Piotta	Ambrì	Valascia	6,500
SC Bern	Bern	PostFinance-Arena	17,131
EHC Biel	Biel/Bienne	Eisstadion Biel	6,200
HC Davos	Davos	Vaillant Arena	6,800
HC Fribourg-Gottéron	Fribourg	BCF Arena	6,700
Genève-Servette HC	Geneva	Patinoire des Vernets	7,135
Kloten Flyers	Kloten	Kolping Arena	7,719
Lausanne HC	Lausanne	CIG de Malley	7,600
HC Lugano	Lugano	Pista La Resega	7,800
Rapperswil-Jona Lakers	Rapperswil	Diners Club Arena	6,200
EV Zug	Zug	Bossard Arena	7,015
ZSC Lions	Zurich	Hallenstadion	11,200

== Regular season ==
Final standings.

Rank	Team	GP	W	L	OTW	OTL	SOW	SOL	Goals	Diff.	Pts
1	ZSC Lions	50	27	10	1	5	2	5	148:106	42	97
2	SC Bern	50	27	13	2	0	3	5	158:120	38	96
3	HC Lugano	50	27	13	2	3	6	2	155:127	28	93
4	EV Zug	50	27	13	2	2	5	4	166:126	40	92
5	HC Davos	50	23	15	3	1	3	5	164:132	32	87
6	Genève-Servette HC	50	16	16	3	3	3	6	154:154	0	78
7	Lausanne HC	50	24	20	1	2	4	4	105:116	-11	73
8	EHC Biel	50	22	21	4	5	3	2	142:164	-22	66
9	HC Fribourg-Gottéron	50	11	22	3	5	6	3	144:177	-33	59
10	Kloten Flyers	50	13	25	4	1	4	3	117:144	-27	59
11	HC Ambrì-Piotta	50	11	24	4	2	5	4	124:167	-43	57
12	Rapperswil-Jona Lakers	50	7	28	3	3	4	5	121:165	-44	43

== Playoffs ==
Quarter-Finals
1	ZSC Lions	4
8	EHC Biel	3
2	SC Bern	4
7	Lausanne HC	3
(Pairings are reseeded after the first round)
3	HC Lugano	2
6	Genève-Servette HC	4
4	EV Zug	2
5	HC Davos	4

Semi-Finals
1	ZSC Lions	4
6	Genève-Servette HC	2
2	SC Bern	0
5	HC Davos	4

Finals
1	ZSC Lions	1
5	HC Davos	4

== Relegation playoffs – Playouts ==
=== 1st round ===
Rank	Team	GP	W	L	OTW	OTL	SOW	SOL	Goals	Diff.	Pts
1	HC Fribourg-Gottéron	6	4	1	0	1	0	0	160:186	-26	72
2	Kloten Flyers	6	4	2	0	0	0	0	131:150	-19	71
3	HC Ambrì-Piotta	6	1	4	1	0	0	0	136:188	-52	62
4	Rapperswil-Jona Lakers	6	2	4	0	0	0	0	133:183	-50	49

=== 2nd round ===
==== (3) Ambrì-Piotta vs. (4) Lakers ====
17 March 2015; 20:15	Ambrì-Piotta	2–1 (2–0, 0–1, 0–0)	Lakers	Valascia, Ambrì; Attendance: 4,216

Game reference

Sandro Zurkirchen
Goalies
Tim Wolf
Referees:
Marcus Vinnerborg
Tobias Wehrli
Linesmen:
Roger Bürgi
Peter Küng

A. Giroux (K. Aucoin, F. Bouillon) (PP) 11:08	1–0
I. Pestoni (A. Hall, F. Bouillon) (PP) 13:42	2–0
	2–1	29:58 N. Danielsson (P. Schommer, N. Persson) (PP)

6 min
Penalties
20 min
34
Shots
35

19 March 2015; 19:45	Lakers	3–2 (0–1, 2–1, 1–0)	Ambrì-Piotta	Diners Club Arena, Rapperswil; Attendance: 4,511

Game reference

Tim Wolf
Goalies
Sandro Zurkirchen
Referees:
Andreas Koch
Marc Wiegand
Linesmen:
Roger Bürgi
Andreas Kohler

	0–1	6:32 K. Aucoin (P. Sidler, A. Trunz)
N. Danielsson (D. Walser, P. Schommer) (PP) 28:00	1–1
	1–2	34:20 D. Steiner (A. Dostoinov, P. Duca) (PP)
S. Hürlimann (S. Ryser, P. Schommer) (PP) 35:28	2–2
M. Pedretti (R. Kuonen) 50:03	3–2

37 min
Penalties
35 min
50
Shots
25

21 March 2015; 19:45	Ambrì-Piotta	SO 4–3 (1–1, 2–2, 0–0) (OT 0–0) (SO: 1–0)	Lakers	Valascia, Ambrì; Attendance: 5,372

Game reference

Sandro Zurkirchen
Goalies
Tim Wolf
Referees:
Ken Mollard
Daniel Stricker
Linesmen:
Balazs Kovacs
Marc-Henri Progin

	0–1	3:10 L. Sieber (N. Danielsson, D. Walser)
A. Hall (D. Steiner) 14:38	1–1
A. Hall (F. Bouillon, K. Aucoin) (PP) 20:56	2–1
	2–2	23:18 R. Kuonen (E. Walsky)
A. Giroux (I. Pestoni) (PP) 38:57	3–2
	3–3	39:18 A. Rizzello (S. Hürlimann)

A. Hall
A. Giroux
K. Aucoin (miss)
I. Pestoni (miss)
Shootout
(miss) A. Rizzello
(miss) N. Persson
(miss) P. Obrist
(miss) J. Fransson
8 min
Penalties
12 min
45
Shots
44

24 March 2015; 19:45	Lakers	0–4 (0–3, 0–1, 0–0)	Ambrì-Piotta	Diners Club Arena, Rapperswil; Attendance: 4,323

Game reference

Tim Wolf
Goalies
Sandro Zurkirchen
Referees:
Stefan Eichmann
Tobias Wehrli
Linesmen:
Roger Bürgi
Andreas Kohler

0–1	5:02 K. Aucoin (I. Pestoni)
0–2	13:41 I. Pestoni (K. Aucoin, A. Birbaum)
0–3	14:36 C. Stucki (F. Lüthi)
0–4	29:22 A. Dostoinov (R. Schlagenhauf, J. Zgraggen)

8 min
Penalties
10 min
40
Shots
27

26 March 2015; 19:45	Ambrì-Piotta	3–4 OT (1–1, 1–1, 1–1) (OT 0–1)	Lakers	Valascia, Ambrì; Attendance: 5,384

Game reference

Sandro Zurkirchen
Goalies
Tim Wolf
Referees:
Andreas Koch
Didier Massy
Linesmen:
Marc-Henri Progin
Simon Wüst

	0–1	4:31 A. Rizzello (S. Hürlimann, N. Persson)
D. Steiner (A. Dostoinov, B. Chavaillaz) (PP) 12:40	1–1
B. Chavaillaz (K. Aucoin, A. Hall) (PP) 20:58	2–1
	2–2	31:58 R. Kuonen (L. Profico, F. Schmutz) (PP)
	2–3	42:51 P. Obrist (J. Fransson, F. Schmutz)
R. Schlagenhauf (J. Zgraggen, P. Duca) 52:23	3–3
	3–4	74:17 C. Hächler (M. Pedretti)

16 min
Penalties
12 min
26
Shots
51

28 March 2015; 19:45	Lakers	3–6 (2–1, 0–2, 1–3)	Ambrì-Piotta	Diners Club Arena, Rapperswil; Attendance: 5,306

Game reference

Tim Wolf
Goalies
Sandro Zurkirchen
Referees:
Stefan Eichmann
Daniel Stricker
Linesmen:
Franco Espinoza
Peter Küng

M. Pedretti (R. Kuonen, D. Walser) 1:10	1–0
M. Johansson (PP) 10:03	2–0
	2–1	13:14 A. Lauper (A. Hall, A. Trunz)
	2–2	28:27 R. O'Byrne (A. Hall, J. Zgraggen)
	2–3	29:31 A. Birbaum (I. Pestoni, L. Lhoták)
	2–4	50:06 K. Aucoin (I. Pestoni, F. Bouillon) (PP)
E. Walsky (C. Geyer) 51:42	3–4
	3–5	53:55 I. Pestoni (L. Lhoták)
	3–6	58:56 D. Steiner (L. Poudrier

10 min
Penalties
14 min
30
Shots
37

Ambrì-Piotta won series 4–2

=== 3rd round – League Qualification ===
==== Lakers vs. SCL Tigers ====
2 April 2015; 19:45	Lakers	2–4 (0–0, 2–2, 0–2)	SCL Tigers	Diners Club Arena, Rapperswil; Attendance: 5,191

Game reference

Tim Wolf
Goalies
Damiano Ciaccio
Referees:
Didier Massy
Marc Wiegand
Linesmen:
Franco Espinoza
Peter Küng

D. Weisskopf 22:04	1–0
	1–1	23:59 S. Lindemann
	1–2	32:02 K. Hecquefeuille (L. Haas, C. DiDomenico) (PP)
E. Walsky 33:27	2–2
	2–3	57:39 S. Lindemann (K. Lindemann
	2–4	59:12 A. Gerber (A. Gustafsson, L. Haas)

8 min
Penalties
31 min
25
Shots
33

4 April 2015; 19:45	SCL Tigers	4–3 OT (2–0, 0–2, 1–1) (OT 1–0)	Lakers	Ilfis Stadium, Langnau im Emmental; Attendance: 6,050

Game reference

Damiano Ciaccio
Goalies
Tim Wolf
Referees:
Stefan Eichmann
Daniel Stricker
Linesmen:
Nicolas Fluri
Michael Tscherrig

L. Haas (S. Lindemann, C. DiDomenico) 16:28	1–0
T. Bucher (C. DiDomenico) (PP) 17:33	2–0
	2–1	23:59 P. Obrist (S. Ryser, J. Murray)
	2–2	30:08 J. Murray (S. Ryser, P. Obrist)
S. Lindemann (C. Moggi, L. Haas) (PP) 41:38	3–2
	3–3	59:52 J. Fransson (S. Ryser, M. Johansson)
C. DiDomenico (PP) 66:41	4–3

6 min
Penalties
18 min
43
Shots
32

6 April 2015; 16:30	Lakers	3–4 OT (1–0, 0–3, 2–0) (OT 0–1)	SCL Tigers	Diners Club Arena, Rapperswil; Attendance: 6,017

Game reference

Tim Wolf
Goalies
Damiano Ciaccio
Referees:
Danny Kurmann
Marcus Vinnerborg
Linesmen:
Roman Kaderli
Simon Wüst

A. Rizzelo (M. Johansson) 16:29	1–0
	1–1	27:01 Y. Müller (C. DiDomenico, M. Stettler (PP)
	1–2	34:49 Y. Müller (S. Lindemann, L. Haas)
	1–3	39:56 T. Bucher (A. Gustafsson, C. DiDomenico)
D. Weisskopf (J. Fransson, M. Johansson) (PP) 55:38	2–3
M. Johansson (S. Ryser, J. Fransson) (PP) 59:38	3–3
	3–4	63:26 A. Gustafsson (C. DiDomenico, T. Bucher)

30 min
Penalties
40 min
18
Shots
12

9 April 2015; 19:45	SCL Tigers	5–1 (2–0, 0–1, 3–0)	Lakers	Ilfis Stadium, Langnau im Emmental; Attendance: 6,050

Game reference

Damiano Ciaccio
Goalies
Ivars Punnenovs
Referees:
Didier Massy
Marc Wiegand
Linesmen:
Franco Espinoza
Peter Küng

T. Bucher (C. DiDomenico) 2:58	1–0
L. Haas 3:35	2–0
	2–1	30:16 D. Walser (N. Berger, A. Rizzelo)
C. DiDomenico (A. Gerber) 53:04	3–1
L. Haas (S. Lindemann, Y. Müller) 53:38	4–1
K. Hecquefeuille (PP) 57:53	5–1

8 min
Penalties
31 min
28
Shots
38

SCL Tigers won series 4–0

SCL Tigers won the series and were promoted to NLA and will play there in 2015–16 season. Rapperswil-Jona Lakers were relegated to National League B and will play there in 2015–16 season.
