= Tim Wolf =

Swiss ice hockey player

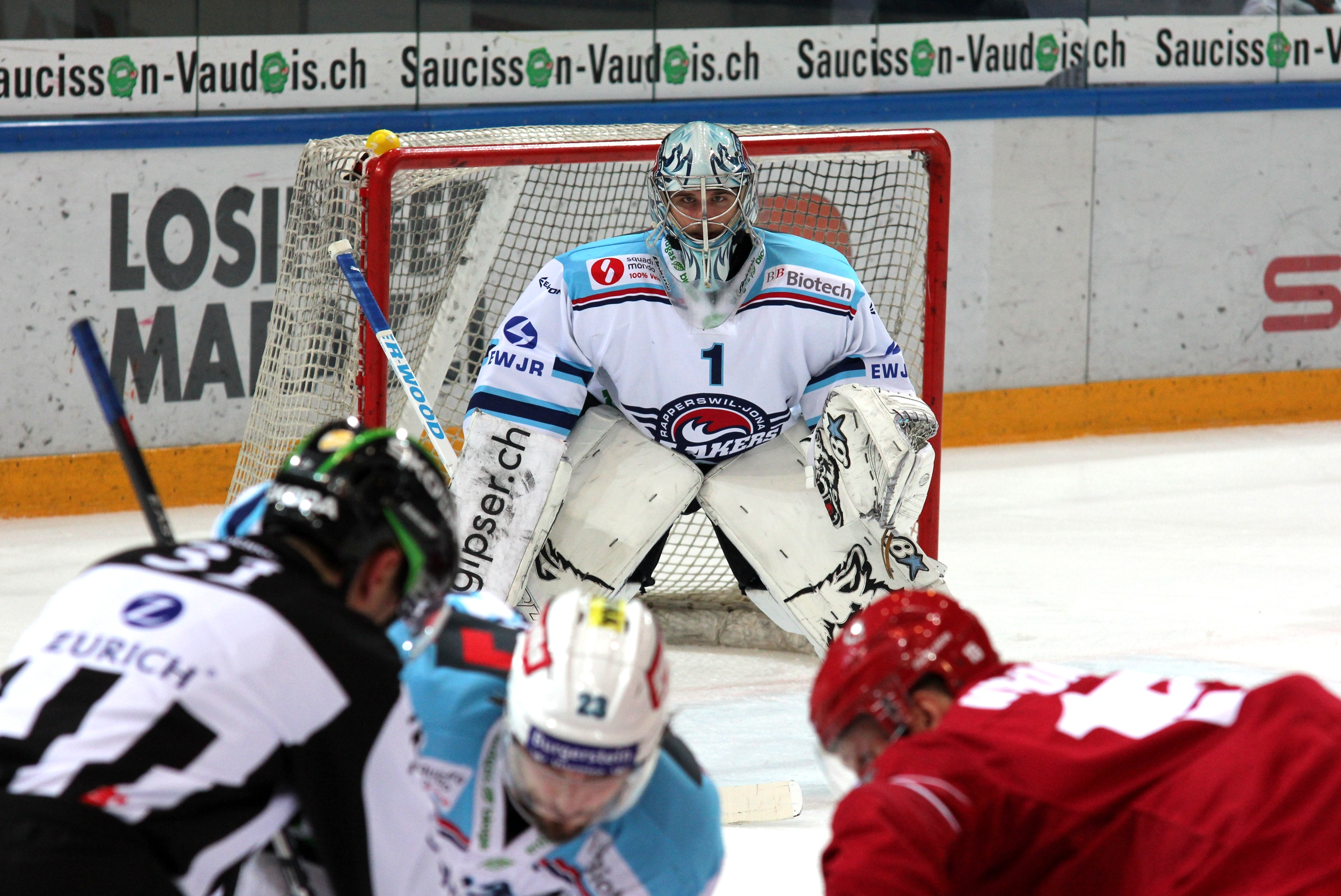
- Born: 25 January 1992 (age 34) Zurich, Switzerland
- Height: 6 ft 1 in (185 cm)
- Weight: 176 lb (80 kg; 12 st 8 lb)
- Position: Goaltender
- Catches: Left
- NL team Former teams: EV Zug; HC Ajoie; ZSC Lions; Rapperswil-Jona Lakers; HC Ambrì-Piotta; HC La Chaux-de-Fonds
- Playing career: 2010–present

Tim Wolf (born 25 January 1992) is a Swiss professional ice hockey goaltender who is currently playing with EV Zug in the National League (NL). Wolf made his European Elite debut during the 2010–11 season playing in the National League with the ZSC Lions.

== Playing career ==
In the 2014–15 season, Wolf played in a career high 38 games in the NL with the Rapperswil-Jona Lakers, however was unable to save the club from relegation. On 3 August 2015 he was signed to remain in the top league, by HC Ambrì-Piotta to a one-year deal as a replacement for Nolan Schaefer.

== International play ==
Wolf participated at the 2012 World Junior Ice Hockey Championships as a member of the Switzerland men's national junior ice hockey team.

== Career statistics ==
=== Regular season and playoffs ===
			Regular season									Playoffs
Season	Team	League	GP	W	L	MIN	GA	GAA	SV%	SO	PIM	GP	W	L	MIN	GA	GAA	SV%	SO	PIM
2009-10	GCK Lions	NLB	3	0	2	126	14	6.68	-	0	-	-	-	-	-	-	-	-	-	-
2010-11	GCK Lions	NLB	6	2	3	242	13	3.23	-	0	0	-	-	-	-	-	-	-	-	-
2010–11	ZSC Lions	NLA	1	0	1	11	2	11.70	.500	0	0	-	-	-	-	-	-	-	-	-
2011-12	GCK Lions	NLB	24	11	10	1367	65	2.85	-	1	0	4	1	2	236	14	3.57	-	0	0
2012-13	GCK Lions	NLB	21	9	10	1249	67	3.22	-	0	0	-	-	-	-	-	-	-	-	-
2012–13	ZSC Lions	NLA	8	0	3	308	16	3.12	.877	0	0	-	-	-	-	-	-	-	-	-
2013-2014	ZSC Lions	NLA	6	4	1	262	9	2.06	.920	1	0	4	0	0	91	2	1.33	.950	0	0
2013-14	GC Küsnacht Lions	NLB	16	3	10	940	58	3.70	-	0	0	-	-	-	-	-	-	-	-	-
2014-15	Rapperswil-Jona Lakers	NLA	38	11	19	2202	114	3.11	.899	1	2	11	4	6	694	32	2.77	.915	1	0
2015-16	HC Ambrì-Piotta	NLA	5	0	3	201	19	5.69	.827	0	0	2	1	1	119	7	3.56	.891	0	0
2016-17	HC La Chaux-de-Fonds	NLB	35	24	7	2029	89	2.63	90,6	2	2	10	5	5	596	28	2.82	.904	1	2
2017-18	HC La Chaux-de-Fonds	SL	42	21	13	2430	111	2.74	.912	2	0	5	0	3	317	16	3.03	.887	0	0
2018-19	HC La Chaux-de-Fonds	SL	32	18	6	1859	71	2.29	.922	3	0	13	5	4	788	26	1.98	.936	0	0
2019-20	HC Ajoie	SL	33	23	7	1919	73	2.28	.907	1	0	5	4	1	299	12	2.41	.930	0	0
2020-21	HC Ajoie	SL	31	21	6	1865	65	2.09	.930	5	0	16	12	4	967	31	1.92	.944	4	2
2021-22	HC Ajoie	NL	44	8	33	2421	163	4.04	.897	1	4	-	-	-	-	-	-	-	-	-
2021-22	EHC Kloten	SL	0	-	-	-	-	-	-	-	-	8	7	0	507	9	1.07	.961	1	2
2022-23	HC Ajoie	NL	30	8	18	1658	91	3.29	.909	0	0	5	2	1	349	12	2.07	.942	0	0
NL totals			132	31	78	7061	414	3.52	.898	3	6	22	7	8	1250	53	2.54	.923	1	2
SL totals			243	93	55	11592	515	2.67	.918	9	2	61	29	12	3391	120	2.12	.936	6	6

=== Tournament ===
Year	Team	Event	Result	GP	W	L	MIN	GA	GAA	SV%	SO	PIM
2012	ZSC Lions	European Trophy	Regulation Round	2	-	-	119	6	3.04	.897	0	0
2013	ZSC Lions	European Trophy	Regulation Round	2	-	-	80	4	3.00	.902	0	0
2015	Rapperswil-Jona Lakers	Swiss Cup	Quarter-finals	3	2	1	149	5	2.02	-	1	-
2014	HC Davos / Genève-Servette HC	Spengler Cup	1st place, gold medalist(s)	0	-	-	-	-	-	-	-	-
2014-15	Rapperswil-Jona Lakers	NLA Qualification	Relegated in LNB	3	0	1	166	11	3.98	.896	0	2
2016	HC Ambrì-Piotta	Swiss Cup	Quarter-finals	3	2	1	185	8	2.59	-	0	-
2017	HC La Chaux-de-Fonds	Swiss Cup	Round of 16	1	0	0	65	3	2.77	-	0	-
2018	HC La Chaux-de-Fonds	Swiss Cup	Round of 32	1	0	1	60	3	3.00	-	0	-
2019	HC La Chaux-de-Fonds	Swiss Cup	Round of 16	1	1	0	60	0	0.00	1.000	1	-
2020	HC Ajoie	Swiss Cup	1st place, gold medalist(s)	4	4	0	241	12	2.99	-	0	-
2021	HC Ajoie	Swiss Cup	Quarter-finals	3	2	1	179	5	1.68	-	0	-
2022-23	HC Ajoie	NL Qualification	Maintain in NL	5	4	1	333	9	1.62	.952	0	0

=== International ===
Year	Team	Event	Result	GP	W	L	MIN	GA	GAA	SV%	SO	PIM
2012	Switzerland	WJC	8th	5	2	2	254	12	2.84	.910	0	2

== Awards and honours ==
Award	Year	Ref
Swiss U17 Elit
Champion	2007-08	
Swiss U21 Elit A
Champion	2009-10, 2010-11, 2011-12	
Most wins	2010-11	
WJC
Top 3 Player on Team	2012	
NLA
Champion	2013-2014	
NLB / SL
Most wins	2016-17, 2018-19	
Most Minutes Played	2018-19	
Champion	2020-21, 2021-22	
NL Promotion	2020-21, 2021-22	
Spengler Cup
Champion	2014	
Swiss Cup
Champion	2020	
