= Mike Posma =

American ice hockey player

- Born: 16 December 1967 (age 58) Medford, New Jersey, U.S.
- Height: 6 ft 0 in (183 cm)
- Weight: 203 lb (92 kg; 14 st 7 lb)
- Position: Defense
- Shot: Right
- Played for: Utica Devils; SC Lyss; HC Thurgau; EHC Kloten; Adler Mannheim; EHC Chur
- NHL draft: 31st overall, 1986; St. Louis Blues
- Playing career: 1990–1999

Mike Posma (born December 16, 1967, in Medford, New Jersey) is an American former professional ice hockey player and former head coach.

== Playing career ==
Posma was drafted by the St. Louis Blues in the 1986 NHL entry draft. He played professionally for the Utica Devils of the American Hockey League and later in Switzerland and Germany.

== Coaching career ==
He coached in Switzerland and Slovenia. With Slovenian club HDD Olimpija he got to the finals of EBEL league

== Career statistics ==
			Regular season					Playoffs
Season	Team	League	GP	G	A	Pts	PIM	GP	G	A	Pts	PIM
1986–87	Western Michigan University	NCAA	35	12	31	43	42	—	—	—	—	—
1987–88	Western Michigan University	NCAA	42	16	38	54	30	—	—	—	—	—
1988–89	Western Michigan University	NCAA	43	7	34	41	58	—	—	—	—	—
1989–90	Western Michigan University	NCAA	39	8	28	36	28	—	—	—	—	—
1990–91	Utica Devils	AHL	79	19	30	49	35	—	—	—	—	—
1991–92	SC Lyss	NLB	36	17	16	33	36	10	6	8	14	8
1992–93	HC Thurgau	NLB	36	16	11	27	59	—	—	—	—	—
1993–94	HC Thurgau	NLB	36	7	19	26	36	4	2	3	5	4
1994–95	HC Thurgau	NLB	36	14	10	24	51	5	1	4	5	2
1995–96	HC Thurgau	NLB	36	17	15	32	28	7	3	4	7	16
1996–97	HC Thurgau	NLB	40	27	37	64	20	8	3	8	11	14
1997–98	EHC Kloten	NLA	24	2	3	5	8	—	—	—	—	—
1997–98	Adler Mannheim	DEL	8	0	0	0	58	10	1	0	1	8
1998–99	EHC Chur	NLB	40	10	25	35	28	1	1	2	3	2
AHL totals			78	19	30	49	35	—	—	—	—	—
DEL totals			8	0	0	0	58	10	1	0	1	8
NLA totals			24	2	3	5	8	—	—	—	—	—
NLB totals			260	108	133	241	258	40	17	31	48	56

== Awards and honours ==
Award	Year
All-CCHA Second Team	1987-88
