= Jonathan Hazen =

Canadian ice hockey player

- Born: June 18, 1990 (age 36) Val-Bélair, Quebec, Canada
- Height: 5 ft 11 in (180 cm)
- Weight: 170 lb (77 kg; 12 st 2 lb)
- Position: Right wing
- Shoots: Right
- NL team Former teams: HC Ajoie; HC Ambrì-Piotta; HC Eppan Pirates; Cincinnati Cyclones; San Antonio Rampage; Val-d'Or Foreurs
- NHL draft: Undrafted
- Playing career: 2011–present

Jonathan Hazen (born June 18, 1990) is a Canadian professional ice hockey player. He is currently playing for HC Ajoie of the National League (NL).

== Playing career ==
Hazen played major junior hockey in the Quebec Major Junior Hockey League, with the Val d'Or Foreurs where he scored 224 points in 241 games played.

On March 19, 2011, the Florida Panthers of the National Hockey League signed Hazen to an entry-level contract. He was assigned to play in the American Hockey League with the San Antonio Rampage to start the 2011–12 season. During both the 2012–13 and the 2013–14 seasons, Hazen divided his time between the Rampage and the Cincinnati Cyclones, the Panthers' ECHL affiliate.

In August 2014, Italian club, the HC Eppan Pirates announced that Hazen was joining the team on a one-year deal. Hazen made 44 appearances that season, tallying 27 goals and 40 assists. After one season, Hazen continued his European career in moving the Switzerland to sign an optional two-year contract with NLB club, HC Ajoie on March 31, 2015. He captured the NLB title in his first year with the club and played a big role in the team's success, scoring a league-best 44 goals in 62 contests to go along with 46 assists.

== Career statistics ==
			Regular season					Playoffs
Season	Team	League	GP	G	A	Pts	PIM	GP	G	A	Pts	PIM
2007-08	Val-d'Or Foreurs	QMJHL	65	21	19	40	25	4	2	1	3	0
2008-09	Val-d'Or Foreurs	QMJHL	62	20	25	45	26	-	-	-	-	-
2009-10	Val-d'Or Foreurs	QMJHL	53	24	35	59	59	6	2	1	3	2
2010-11	Val-d'Or Foreurs	QMJHL	62	41	42	83	29	1	0	0	0	5
2011-12	San Antonio Rampage	AHL	9	1	0	1	0	-	-	-	-	-
2011-12	Cincinnati Cyclones	ECHL	48	12	19	31	30	-	-	-	-	-
2012-13	San Antonio Rampage	AHL	48	2	14	16	14	-	-	-	-	-
2012-13	Cincinnati Cyclones	ECHL	12	6	4	10	5	-	-	-	-	-
2013-14	San Antonio Rampage	AHL	10	0	0	0	2	-	-	-	-	-
2013-14	Cincinnati Cyclones	ECHL	58	22	28	50	45	24	8	11	19	10
2014-15	HC Eppan Pirates	Serie A	37	25	32	57	63	7	2	8	10	2
2014-15	HC Eppan Pirates	Coppa Italia	2	0	1	1	2	-	-	-	-	-
2015-16	HC Ajoie	NLB	44	32	29	61	36	18	12	17	29	16
2015-16	HC Ajoie	Swiss Cup	2	5	2	7	2	-	-	-	-	-
2016-17	HC Ajoie	NLB	48	34	38	72	62	10	9	9	18	6
2016-17	HC Ajoie	Swiss Cup	1	0	1	1	0	-	-	-	-	-
2017-18	HC Ajoie	SL	46	28	44	72	40	10	3	7	10	4
2017-18	HC Ajoie	Swiss Cup	4	2	1	3	2	-	-	-	-	-
2017-18	HC Ambrì-Piotta	NL	2	0	0	0	2	-	-	-	-	-
2018-19	HC Ajoie	SL	42	30	32	62	37	7	2	4	6	12
2018-19	HC Ajoie	Swiss Cup	1	1	0	1	0	-	-	-	-	-
2019-20	HC Ajoie	SL	38	39	44	83	32	5	4	3	7	0
2019-20	HC Ajoie	Swiss Cup	5	8	8	16	0	-	-	-	-	-
2020-21	HC Ajoie	SL	46	41	40	81	38	13	7	10	17	8
2020-21	HC Ajoie	Swiss Cup	3	1	1	2	4	-	-	-	-	-
2021-22	HC Ajoie	NL	8	2	4	6	0	-	-	-	-	-
2022-23	HC Ajoie	NL	38	12	21	33	2	6	4	1	5	0
2022-23	HC Ajoie	NL Qualification	6	4	1	5	0	1	1	0	1	0
2023-24	HC Ajoie	NL	51	15	20	35	8	-	-	-	-	-
QMJHL totals			242	106	121	227	139	11	4	2	6	7
AHL totals			67	3	14	17	16	-	-	-	-	-
ECHL totals			118	40	51	91	80	24	8	11	19	10
Serie A totals			37	25	32	57	63	7	2	8	10	2
SL totals			220	172	198	370	209	45	25	33	58	30
NL totals			99	29	45	74	12	6	4	1	5	0

=== International ===
Year	Team	Event	Result	GP	G	A	Pts	PIM
2023	Team Canada	Spengler Cup		4	4	1	5	4
2024	Team Canada	Spengler Cup		3	2	4	6	0
Senior totals				7	6	5	11	4

== Awards and honors ==
Award	Year
International
Spengler Cup scoring leader	2024
