= Thibault Frossard =

Swiss ice hockey player

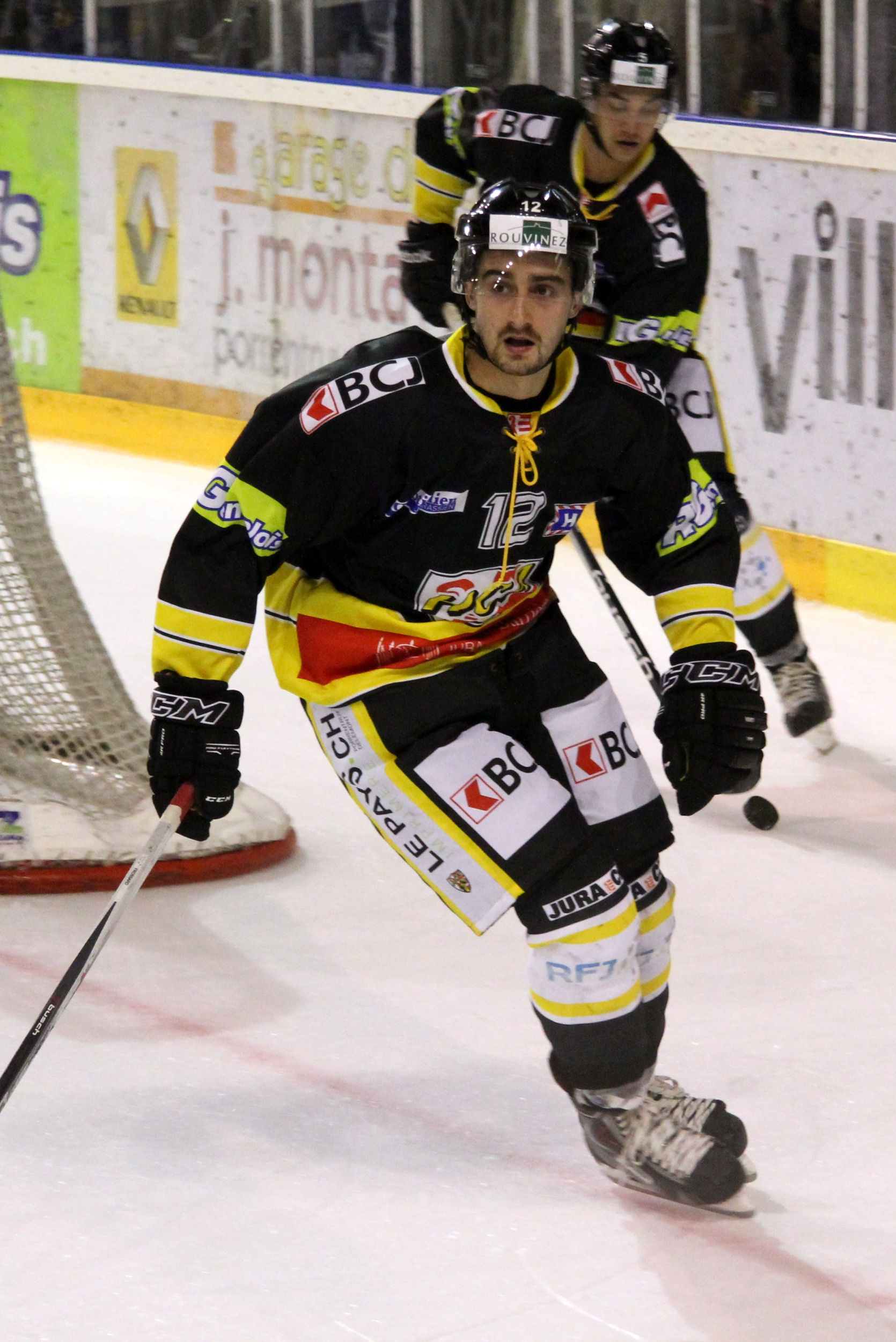
- Born: May 2, 1993 (age 32); Vendlincourt, Switzerland
- Height: 5 ft 10 in (178 cm)
- Weight: 172 lb (78 kg; 12 st 4 lb)
- Position: Centre
- Shoots: Left
- NL team: HC Ajoie
- Playing career: 2012–present

Thibault Frossard (born 2 May 1993) is a Swiss professional ice hockey forward currently playing for HC Ajoie of the National League (NL).

== Playing career ==
Frossard made his National League debut playing with HC Ajoie during the 2011–12. In 2016, he won the LNB championship with HC Ajoie.

Until the 2018–19 season, Frossard signed a one-year contract with HC Ajoie each year. On 15 March 2019, he extended with HC Ajoie for 2 seasons.

In 2020, to everyone's surprise, he won the Swiss Cup by beating HC Davos in the final.

On 21 January 2021, he signed a two-year contract extension with HC Ajoie. In 2021, he won the Swiss League and was promoted to National League by winning the promotion relegation play-off against EHC Kloten.

On 31 January 2023, HC Ajoie submitted a contract for the next three seasons with Frossard. On 25 November 2023, during a game against EV Zug, he simulated having received a blow to the head from Denis Hollenstein. The league fined him 800 CHF.

== Personal life ==
Frossard has a son, Lenny, born in 2019. He got married in June 2021 to Émilie. Since 2018, he has managed a sports store in Glovelier.

== Career statistics ==
			Regular season					Playoffs
Season	Team	League	GP	G	A	Pts	PIM	GP	G	A	Pts	PIM
2011–12	HC Ajoie	NLB	9	0	0	0	0	2	0	0	0	0
2012–13	HC Ajoie	NLB	37	2	4	6	8	—	—	—	—	—
2013–14	HC Ajoie	NLB	45	3	2	5	22	—	—	—	—	—
2014–15	HC Ajoie	NLB	48	4	10	14	14	6	0	0	0	4
2015–16	HC Ajoie	NLB	44	8	10	18	20	18	0	0	0	14
2016–17	HC Ajoie	NLB	34	7	10	17	26	4	0	2	2	25
2017–18	HC Ajoie	SL	40	5	11	16	22	10	0	3	3	10
2018–19	HC Ajoie	SL	44	10	7	17	20	7	1	1	2	25
2019–20	HC Ajoie	SL	43	8	19	27	22	5	1	3	4	12
2020–21	HC Ajoie	SL	45	16	27	43	30	16	8	10	18	12
2021–22	HC Ajoie	NL	51	10	18	28	34	—	—	—	—	—
2022–23	HC Ajoie	NL	51	9	7	16	22	—	—	—	—	—
2023–24	HC Ajoie	NL	51	9	9	18	19	—	—	—	—	—
2024–25	HC Ajoie	NL	27	2	3	5	6	—	—	—	—	—
NL totals			180	30	37	67	81	—	—	—	—	—
