= Eero Elo =

Finnish ice hockey player (born 1990)

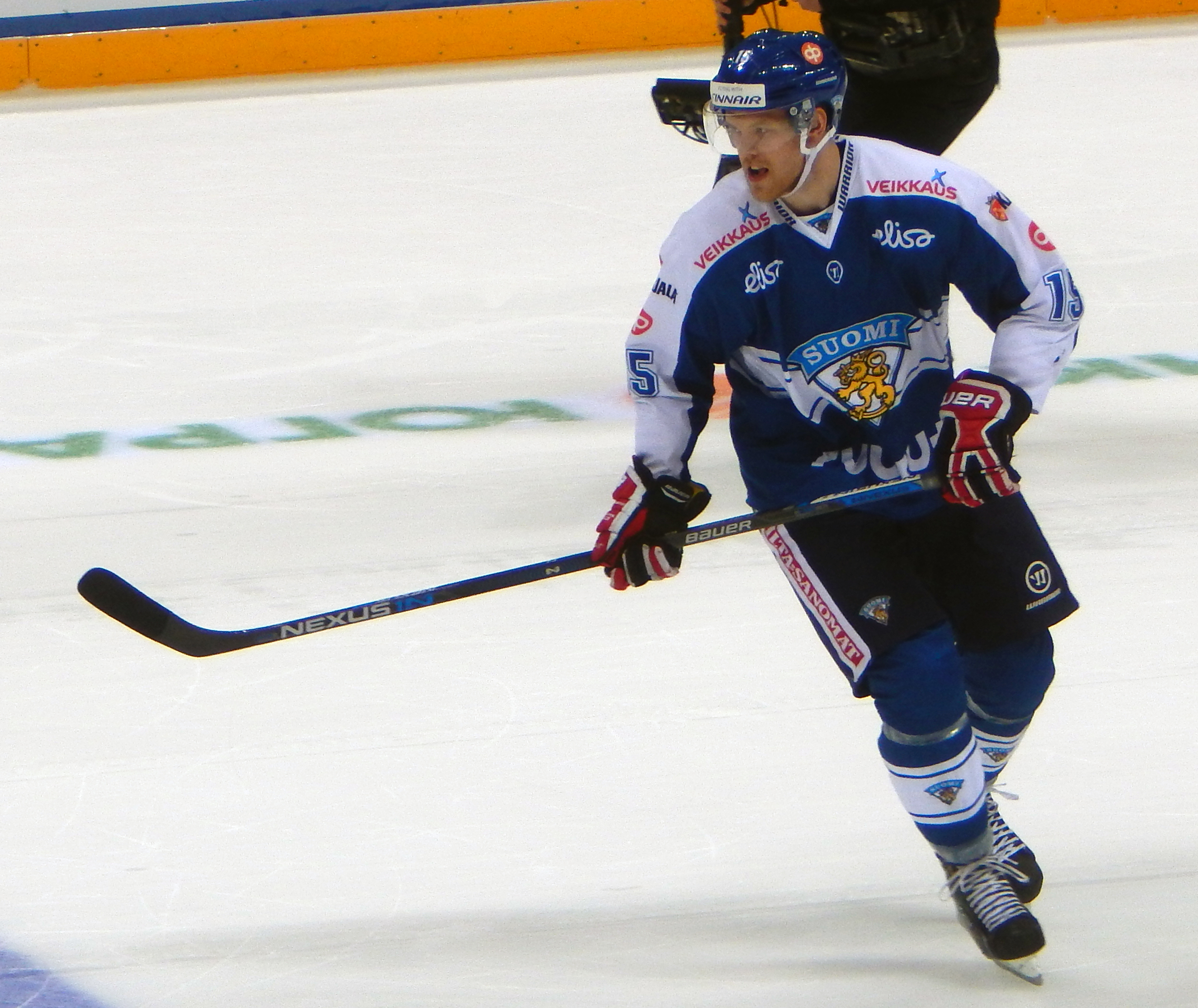
- Born: April 26, 1990 (age 36) Rauma, Finland
- Height: 6 ft 4 in (193 cm)
- Weight: 203 lb (92 kg; 14 st 7 lb)
- Position: Winger
- Shoots: Right
- SL team Former teams: HC Thurgau; Lukko; Pori Ässät; Avtomobilist Yekaterinburg; Sibir Novosibirsk; SCL Tigers; SC Langenthal
- National team: Finland
- NHL draft: 145th overall, 2008; Minnesota Wild
- Playing career: 2009–present

Eero Elo (born April 26, 1990) is a Finnish professional ice hockey player. He is currently playing for HC Thurgau of the Swiss League (SL). Elo was selected by the Minnesota Wild in the 5th round (145th overall) of the 2008 NHL entry draft.

Elo made his SM-liiga debut playing with Lukko during the 2009–10 SM-liiga season.
