= 1994–95 Nationalliga B season =

The 1994-95 Nationalliga B season was the 48th season of the Nationalliga B, the second tier level of ice hockey in Switzerland. 10 teams participated in the league, and Lausanne HC won the championship and were promoted to Nationalliga A.

== Regular season ==
Pl.	Team	GP	W	T	L	GF–GA	Pts.
1.	Lausanne HC	36	30	2	4	215 : 100	62
2.	Grasshopper Club Zurich	36	20	6	10	149 : 102	46
3.	HC Thurgau	36	20	4	12	135 : 104	44
4.	HC La Chaux-de-Fonds	36	18	2	16	151 : 135	38
5.	SC Langnau	36	18	5	15	157 : 153	37
6.	EHC Chur	36	16	4	16	146 : 162	36
7.	SC Herisau	36	14	3	19	127 : 152	31
8.	EHC Olten	36	12	6	18	133 : 173	30
9.	HC Martigny	36	11	5	20	124 : 164	27
10.	HC Ajoie	36	4	1	31	105 : 197	9

== Playoffs ==
Quarter-Finals
1	HC Lausanne	3
8	EHC Olten	0
2	Grasshopper Club Zurich	3
7	SC Herisau	1
(Pairings are reseeded after the first round)
3	HC Thurgau	3
6	EHC Chur	0
4	HC La Chaux-de-Fonds	1
5	SC Langnau	3

Semi-Finals
1	HC Lausanne	3
5	SC Langnau	0
2	Grasshopper Club Zurich	3
3	HC Thurgau	0

Finals
1	HC Lausanne	3
2	Grasshopper Club Zurich	2

== Relegation ==
- HC Martigny - HC Ajoie 4:3 on series

HC Ajoie is relegated.
