= Mikael Johansson (ice hockey, born 1985) =

Swedish ice hockey player (born 1985)

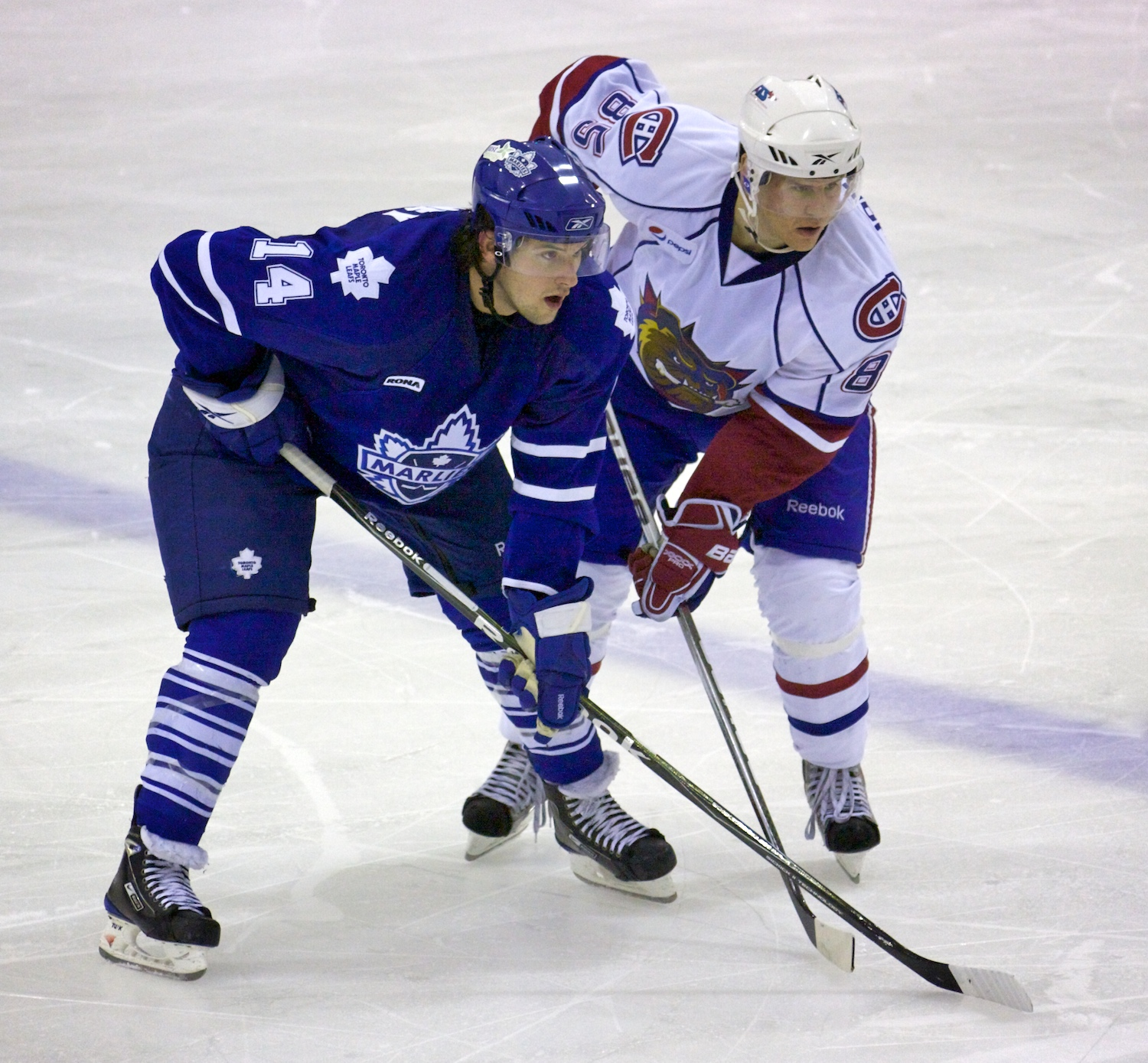
- Johansson (right) in 2009
- Born: June 27, 1985 (age 41) Arvika, Sweden
- Height: 5 ft 9 in (175 cm)
- Weight: 185 lb (84 kg; 13 st 3 lb)
- Position: Centre/Left wing
- Shot: Left
- team Former teams: Free Agent; Färjestad BK; Hamilton Bulldogs; Leksands IF; Rapperswil-Jona Lakers; HC Lada Togliatti; HIFK; Brynäs IF; HC Davos; SCL Tigers
- NHL draft: 289th overall, 2003; Detroit Red Wings
- Playing career: 2001–2020

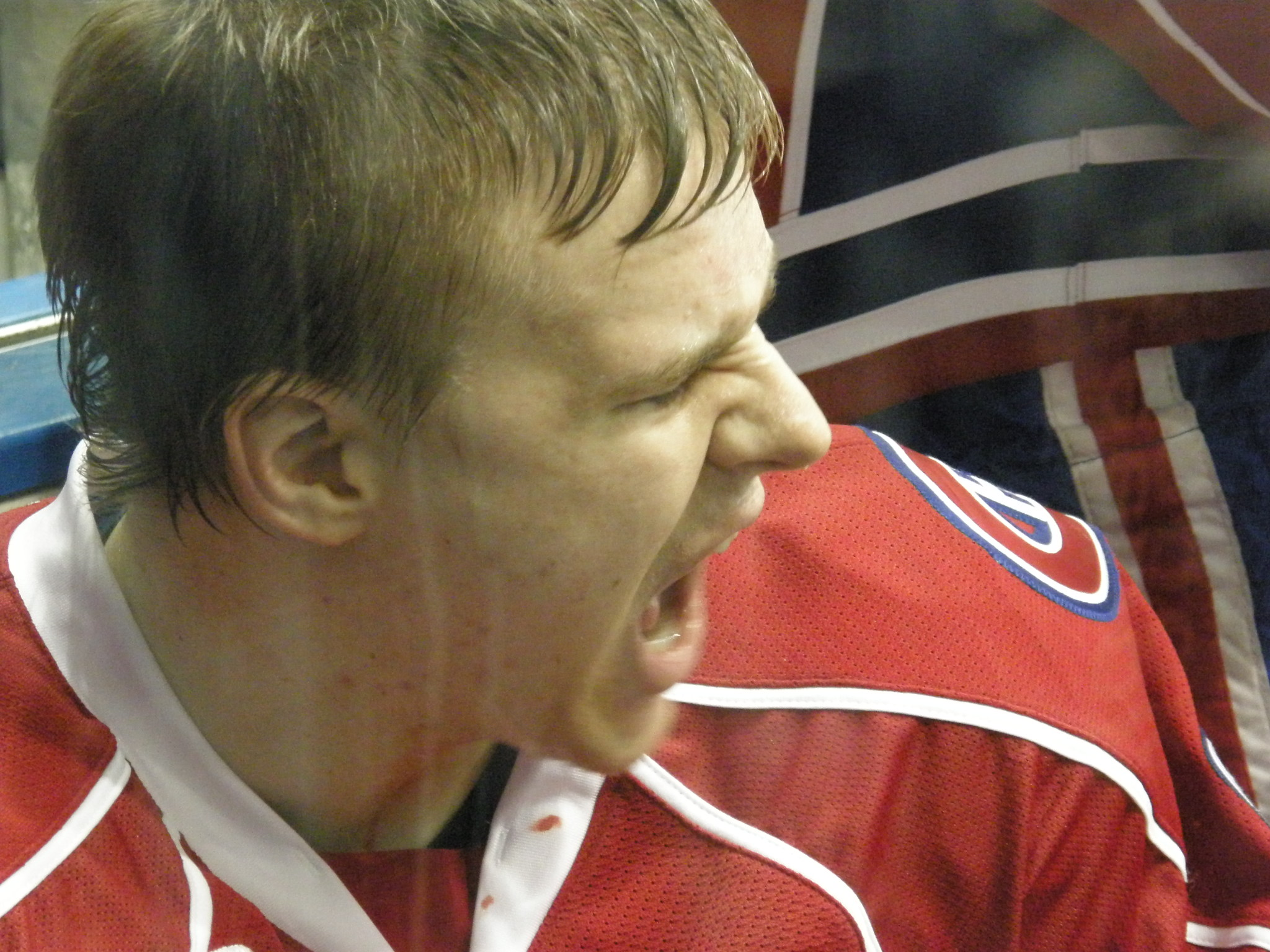
Johansson with Hamilton Bulldogs in 2009

Mikael Johansson (born June 27, 1985) is a Swedish professional ice hockey centre, currently an unrestricted free agent. He most recently played under contract with the SCL Tigers of the Swiss National League (NL). He was selected by the Detroit Red Wings in the 9th round (289th overall) of the 2003 NHL entry draft.

== Playing career ==
Johansson came through the youth ranks of Arvika HC. During the 2004–05 season, he played his first minutes in the Swedish second division HockeyAllsvenskan with Bofors IK and made his debut with Färjestad BK in the top-flight Swedish Hockey League (SHL) one year later. He spent eight years with the club, winning the Swedish championship three times (2006, 2009, 2011), interrupted by a stint with Hamilton Bulldogs of the American Hockey League in 2009-10 after signing with NHL's Montreal Canadiens who sent him to their AHL affiliate.

Johannson signed with fellow SHL side Leksands IF for the 2013–14 season, followed by one season in Switzerland with NLA club Rapperswil-Jona. He then returned to Färjestad BK in 2015.

In May 2016, he agreed to terms with HC Lada Togliatti of the Kontinental Hockey League (KHL).

== Career statistics ==
			Regular season					Playoffs
Season	Team	League	GP	G	A	Pts	PIM	GP	G	A	Pts	PIM
2001–02	Arvika HC	Div.1	31	1	13	14	34	—	—	—	—	—
2002–03	Arvika HC	Div.1	30	13	28	41	89	—	—	—	—	—
2003–04	Skåre BK	Div.1	32	12	16	28	52	10	1	5	6	6
2004–05	Bofors IK	Allsv	45	5	7	12	22	5	0	0	0	0
2005–06	Bofors IK	Allsv	1	0	0	0	0	—	—	—	—	—
2005–06	Färjestads BK	SEL	46	1	5	6	16	16	0	2	2	4
2006–07	Färjestads BK	SEL	55	7	9	12	42	8	2	3	5	4
2007–08	Färjestads BK	SEL	55	15	24	39	80	11	4	5	9	37
2008–09	Färjestads BK	SEL	49	6	28	34	20	11	1	3	4	2
2009–10	Hamilton Bulldogs	AHL	20	3	3	6	2	—	—	—	—	—
2009–10	Färjestads BK	SEL	12	0	6	6	6	7	2	0	2	0
2010–11	Färjestads BK	SEL	45	12	23	35	22	14	5	8	13	2
2011–12	Färjestads BK	SEL	53	8	31	39	48	3	0	1	1	2
2012–13	Färjestads BK	SEL	32	4	14	18	12	10	2	4	6	2
2012–13	Färjestads BK	J20	2	1	1	2	2	—	—	—	—	—
2013–14	Leksands IF	SHL	55	9	30	39	48	3	0	1	1	2
2014–15	Rapperswil–Jona Lakers	NLA	40	6	33	39	46	—	—	—	—	—
2015–16	Färjestads BK	SHL	51	12	28	40	18	5	2	4	6	0
2016–17	Lada Togliatti	KHL	12	1	3	4	4	—	—	—	—	—
2016–17	Dizel Penza	VHL	1	0	0	0	0	—	—	—	—	—
2016–17	HIFK	Liiga	37	8	11	19	14	6	0	2	2	0
2017–18	Brynäs IF	SHL	13	0	3	3	0	—	—	—	—	—
2017–18	HC Davos	NL	14	1	7	8	6	—	—	—	—	—
2017–18	SCL Tigers	NL	3	0	4	4	0	—	—	—	—	—
2018–19	SCL Tigers	NL	21	1	10	11	2	—	—	—	—	—
2019–20	BIK Karlskoga	Allsv	3	0	2	2	4	—	—	—	—	—
SHL totals			464	74	201	275	286	98	18	36	54	55
