= Pascal Caminada =

Swiss professional ice hockey goaltender

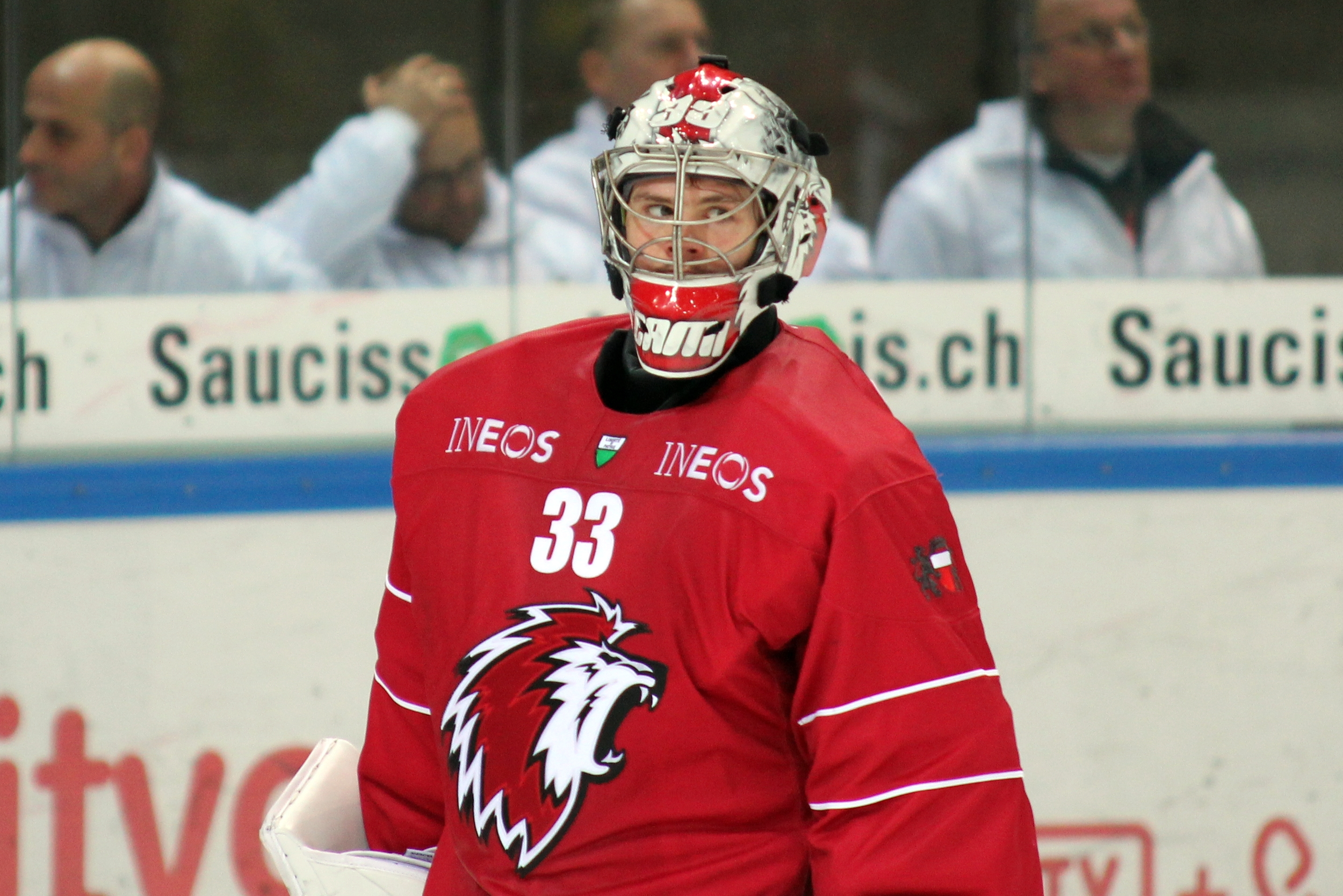
- Born: October 20, 1986 (age 38); Glattbrugg, Switzerland
- Height: 5 ft 9 in (175 cm)
- Weight: 181 lb (82 kg; 12 st 13 lb)
- Position: Goaltender
- Caught: Left
- Played for: HC Fribourg-Gottéron; EHC Biel; EHC Basel; SC Rapperswil-Jona Lakers; Genève-Servette HC; Lausanne HC; SC Bern
- Playing career: 2006–2022

Pascal Caminada (born October 20, 1986) is a Swiss former professional ice hockey goaltender who last played for SC Langenthal of the Swiss League (SL).

== Playing career ==
Caminada began his professional career with HC Fribourg-Gottéron of National League A during the 2006–07 National League A season. He then moved to EHC Biel of National League B and became the team's starting goaltender in 2008 following their promotion to National League A. Caminada lost his starting position to Reto Berra the following season.

In 2010, Caminada returned to Fribourg-Gottéron to serve as backup to Cristobal Huet before taking up a starting role with Lausanne HC of NLB the following season and later with HC Thurgau the season after. He returned to Lausanne in 2014, now in the NLA, as a backup again to Huet.

On April 20, 2017, Caminada signed with SC Bern. During his third season with Bern in 2019-20, in search of more playing time, Caminada agreed to a two-year contract beginning in the following season with SC Langenthal on 14 January 2020.
