= Eric Himelfarb =

Canadian ice hockey player

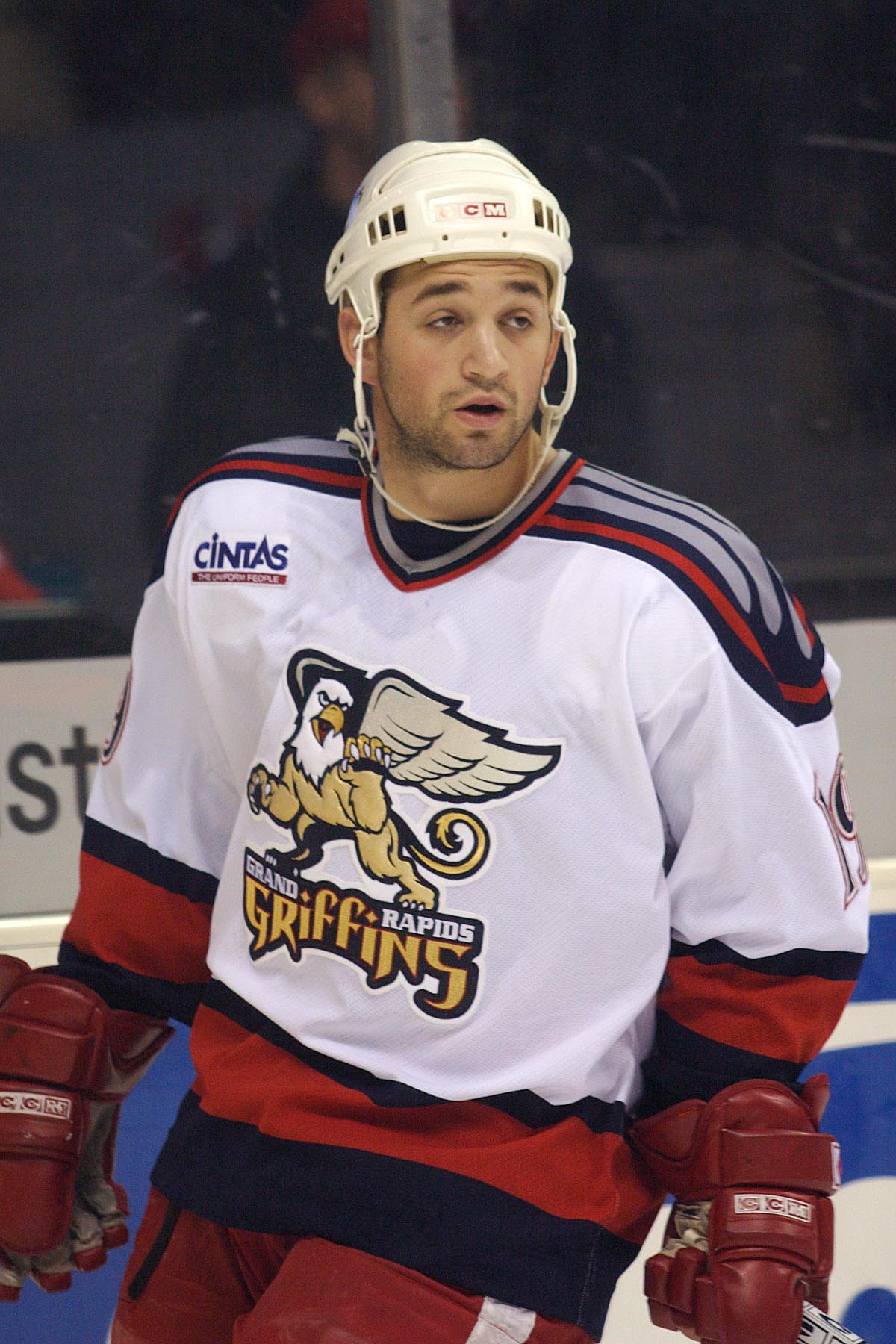
- Himelfarb with the Grand Rapids Griffins in 2005
- Born: January 1, 1983 (age 43) Thornhill, Ontario, Canada
- Height: 5 ft 9 in (175 cm)
- Weight: 175 lb (79 kg; 12 st 7 lb)
- Position: Centre
- Shot: Right
- team Former teams: Retired; Grand Rapids Griffins; Genève-Servette HC; EHC Biel; Linköpings HC; Leksands IF; Malmö Redhawks; HC Thurgau
- NHL draft: 171st overall, 2001; Montreal Canadiens
- Playing career: 2003–2022

Eric Himelfarb (born January 1, 1983) is a Canadian former professional ice hockey player. He was selected in the sixth round, 171st overall, by the Montreal Canadiens in the 2001 NHL entry draft.

== Playing career ==
Himelfarb was 171st overall pick of the Montreal Canadiens in the 2001 NHL entry draft.

Himelfarb signed as a free agent with the Detroit Red Wings on March 30, 2004 and was assigned to the Griffins, their AHL affiliate. After four seasons in Grand Rapids, Himelfarb signed with HC Lausanne of the Swiss League on May 30, 2007. For the 2008/2009 Season Himelfarb was traded to EHC Biel in Swiss National League A, the highest division in Swiss Ice Hockey.

On April 23, 2014, Himelfarb left Linköpings HC after two seasons and signed a contract with fellow SHL club, Leksands IF. He played next for the Malmö Redhawks in 2014-16, for Hockey Thurgau in 2016-17, and in 2017-18 for the SCL Tigers, SC Langenthal, and HC La Chaux-de-Fonds.

== Personal life ==
Himelfarb, who is Jewish, was born in Thornhill, Ontario.

== Career statistics ==
			Regular season					Playoffs
Season	Team	League	GP	G	A	Pts	PIM	GP	G	A	Pts	PIM
1999–2000	Sarnia Sting	OHL	62	14	33	47	26	7	1	4	5	4
2000–01	Sarnia Sting	OHL	49	31	44	75	48	4	1	7	8	4
2001–02	Sarnia Sting	OHL	67	35	48	83	67	5	1	4	5	11
2002–03	Barrie Colts	OHL	67	31	44	75	81	6	1	0	1	6
2003–04	Kingston Frontenacs	OHL	67	37	70	107	80	5	4	4	8	8
2003–04	Grand Rapids Griffins	AHL	7	2	3	5	2	4	0	3	3	0
2004–05	Grand Rapids Griffins	AHL	76	19	24	43	59	—	—	—	—	—
2005–06	Grand Rapids Griffins	AHL	62	10	18	28	60	16	0	0	0	12
2006–07	Grand Rapids Griffins	AHL	69	15	15	30	60	7	1	0	1	12
2007–08	Lausanne HC	SUI.2	36	24	45	69	46	10	7	12	19	12
2007–08	Genève–Servette HC	NLA	1	0	0	0	0	—	—	—	—	—
2008–09	EHC Biel	NLA	47	11	13	24	60	—	—	—	—	—
2009–10	Lausanne HC	SUI.2	10	0	2	2	31	—	—	—	—	—
2009–10	SC Langenthal	SUI.2	24	11	14	25	30	6	3	4	7	2
2010–11	Rögle BK	Allsv	24	5	6	11	16	10	2	7	9	2
2011–12	Rögle BK	Allsv	52	21	39	60	52	8	5	1	6	27
2012–13	Linköpings HC	SEL	49	9	7	16	24	—	—	—	—	—
2013–14	Linköpings HC	SHL	50	7	14	21	36	14	3	4	7	8
2014–15	Leksands IF	SHL	21	3	4	7	8	—	—	—	—	—
2014–15	Malmö Redhawks	Allsv	12	3	12	15	8	11	5	0	5	10
2015–16	Malmö Redhawks	SHL	38	2	10	12	20	—	—	—	—	—
2016–17	HC Thurgau	SUI.2	36	12	18	30	34	4	0	0	0	6
2017–18	SCL Tigers	NL	13	1	4	5	10	—	—	—	—	—
2017–18	SC Langenthal	SUI.2	5	1	1	2	4	—	—	—	—	—
2017–18	HC La Chaux–de–Fonds	SUI.2	6	2	5	7	8	—	—	—	—	—
2019–20	EHC Basel	SUI.3	14	4	8	12	12	6	1	6	7	18
2020–21	EHC Basel	SUI.3	7	3	7	10	8	—	—	—	—	—
2020–21	SC Langenthal	SUI.2	12	0	10	10	2	12	2	3	5	8
2021–22	EHC Basel	SUI.3	30	7	21	28	8	12	5	8	13	29
AHL totals			214	46	60	106	181	27	1	3	4	24
SEL/SHL totals			158	21	35	56	88	14	3	4	7	8

== See also ==
- List of select Jewish ice hockey players
