= Mark Van Guilder =

American professional ice hockey player (born 1984)

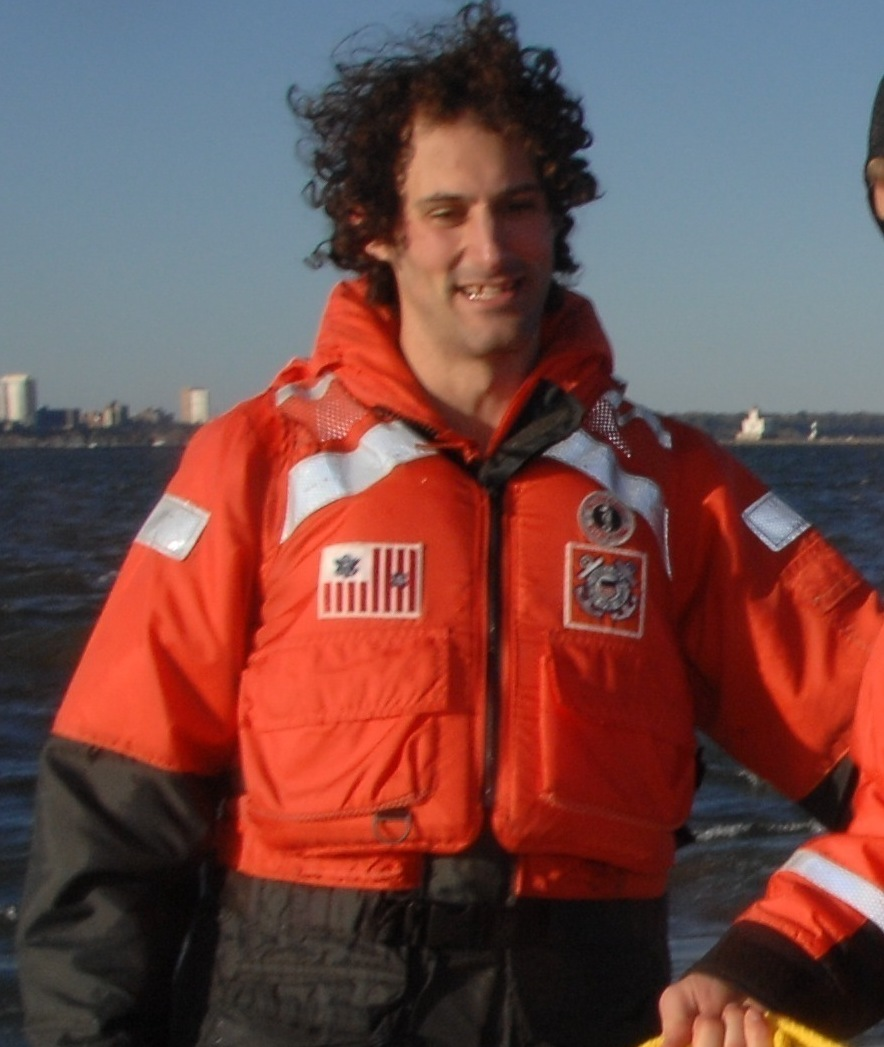
- Van Guilder in 2014
- Born: January 17, 1984 (age 42) Roseville, Minnesota, United States
- Height: 6 ft 2 in (188 cm)
- Weight: 201 lb (91 kg; 14 st 5 lb)
- Position: Center
- Shot: Right
- Played for: Nashville Predators
- NHL draft: Undrafted
- Playing career: 2008–2021

Mark David Van Guilder (born January 17, 1984) is an American former ice hockey player. He played one game in the National Hockey League with the Nashville Predators during the 2013–14 season. The rest of his career, which lasted from 2008 to 2021, was mainly spent in the minor leagues, as well as six seasons in Europe.

== Playing career ==
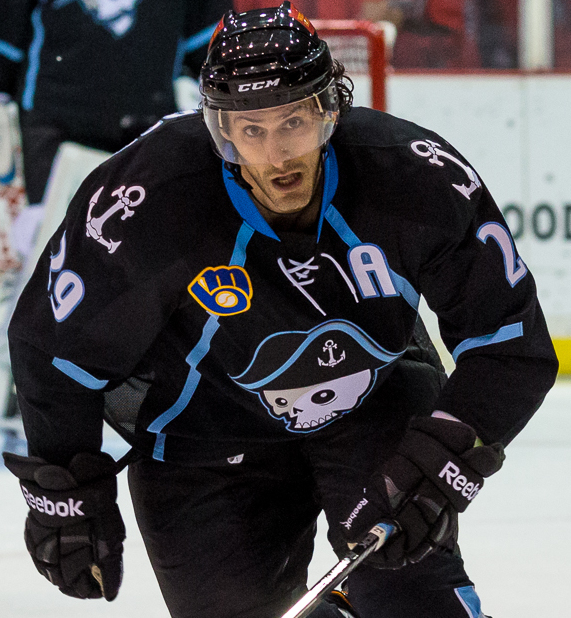
Van Guilder with the Milwaukee Admirals in 2013

Played two years of junior ice hockey with the Tri-City Storm of the United States Hockey League (USHL) from 2002 to 2004. Became the ninth Tri-City player to make it all the way to the National Hockey League (NHL) after making his NHL debut in 2013.

Played NCAA Division I ice hockey at the University of Notre Dame, appearing in 163 consecutive games during his four-year college career from 2004 to 2008. Having never missed a game, Van Guilder is considered the school's all time "Iron-Man." Served as team captain during the 2007–2008 season, during which the Fighting Irish advanced to the Frozen Four and appeared in the 2008 NCAA Division I Men's Ice Hockey Championship game against Boston College. Van Guilder was one of 10 finalists for the Lowe's Senior CLASS Award in 2008.

Played parts of two seasons for the Cincinnati Cyclones in the East Coast Hockey League (ECHL) from 2008 to 2010 before moving up to their American Hockey League (AHL) affiliate, the Milwaukee Admirals, during the 2009–10 season. Appeared in 383 regular season games for the Milwaukee Admirals between 2008 and 2015, becoming the most tenured player in the AHL era of the Milwaukee Admirals after appearing in his 367th game on March 11, 2015. Served as assistant captain during the 2012–13, 2013–14, and 2014–15 seasons.

After five seasons within the affiliates of the Nashville Predators of the National Hockey League (NHL), Van Guilder signed his first NHL contract as an Undrafted Free Agent to a two-year, two-way contract with Nashville on May 20, 2013. During the 2013–14 season, Van Guilder was rewarded with his long-awaited NHL debut with the Predators, playing in a solitary game in a 4–3 shootout victory against the Washington Capitals on March 30, 2014.

After finishing the 2014–15 season with the Milwaukee Admirals, Van Guilder finally left the Predators organization as a free agent and signed a one-year deal with Italian club, Ritten/Renon of the Serie A league on July 30, 2015. Van Guilder was named assistant captain of Ritten Sport and lead the team to both regular season and postseason championships during the 2015–16 season.

Signed a one-year deal with the Stavanger Oilers in Norway's top-tier GET-ligaen on June 13, 2016. The Stavanger Oilers won both the regular and postseason GET-ligaen championships during 2016–17 season. Van Guilder lead the GET-ligaen in points and was named to the league's All-Star Team.

Signed a one-year deal with EHC Visp in the Swiss League on April 12, 2017.

== Personal ==
Van Guilder is a 2002 graduate of Roseville Area High School, where he lettered in football, lacrosse, and ice hockey. He was selected all-Conference and all-State in football as a senior. He helped lead Roseville to a pair of Minnesota lacrosse state championships, earning all-State honors as a junior and senior in lacrosse. He was selected Pioneer Press Male Athlete of the Year in 2002.

Graduated from the University of Notre Dame College of Arts and Letters with a degree in sociology in 2008.

Van Guilder is Roman Catholic and speaks openly about his faith.

Selected as the Milwaukee Admirals' Man of the Year and as a finalist for the AHL Yanick Dupre Memorial Award for four consecutive years from 2011 to 2014. During his seasons with the Milwaukee Admirals, Van Guilder visited schools throughout South Eastern Wisconsin to share how he lives his life as a Catholic professional athlete.

Married to Brinya Bjork. Brother-in-law Anders Bjork signed an entry-level contract with the Boston Bruins on May 30, 2017.

== Career statistics ==
=== Regular season and playoffs ===
			Regular season					Playoffs
Season	Team	League	GP	G	A	Pts	PIM	GP	G	A	Pts	PIM
2001–02	Roseville Area High School	HS-MN	—	—	—	—	—	—	—	—	—	—
2002–03	Tri-City Storm	USHL	59	11	8	19	23	3	0	0	0	0
2003–04	Tri-City Storm	USHL	60	17	22	39	23	11	3	2	5	18
2004–05	Notre Dame	CCHA	38	3	5	8	16	—	—	—	—	—
2005–06	Notre Dame	CCHA	36	8	18	26	6	—	—	—	—	—
2006–07	Notre Dame	CCHA	42	18	16	34	26	—	—	—	—	—
2007–08	Notre Dame	CCHA	47	13	17	30	28	—	—	—	—	—
2008–09	Milwaukee Admirals	AHL	5	0	0	0	0	—	—	—	—	—
2008–09	Cincinnati Cyclones	ECHL	65	26	44	70	18	15	3	4	7	8
2008–09	Hamilton Bulldogs	AHL	3	0	1	1	0	—	—	—	—	—
2009–10	Milwaukee Admirals	AHL	28	0	7	7	8	7	0	0	0	2
2009–10	Cincinnati Cyclones	ECHL	15	6	5	11	21	14	5	10	15	2
2010–11	Milwaukee Admirals	AHL	62	10	7	17	10	13	3	3	6	2
2011–12	Milwaukee Admirals	AHL	70	12	15	27	14	3	1	0	1	0
2012–13	Milwaukee Admirals	AHL	73	14	18	32	9	4	0	0	0	0
2013–14	Milwaukee Admirals	AHL	69	14	15	29	28	3	0	0	0	2
2013–14	Nashville Predators	NHL	1	0	0	0	0	—	—	—	—	—
2014–15	Milwaukee Admirals	AHL	76	11	15	26	22	—	—	—	—	—
2015–16	RittenSport	ITA	42	18	39	57	32	14	12	11	23	10
2016–17	Stavanger Oilers	NOR	45	24	41	65	32	14	10	18	28	10
2017–18	EHC Visp	SUI-2	45	19	22	41	20	6	3	2	5	0
2018–19	EHC Visp	SUI-2	44	18	38	56	26	4	1	1	2	4
2019–20	EHC Visp	SUI-2	41	31	20	51	22	5	1	2	3	4
2020–21	EHC Visp	SUI-2	33	15	21	36	32	6	1	4	5	2
AHL totals			386	61	78	139	95	30	4	3	7	6
NHL totals			1	0	0	0	0	—	—	—	—	—
