= Paolo Duca =

Swiss ice hockey player

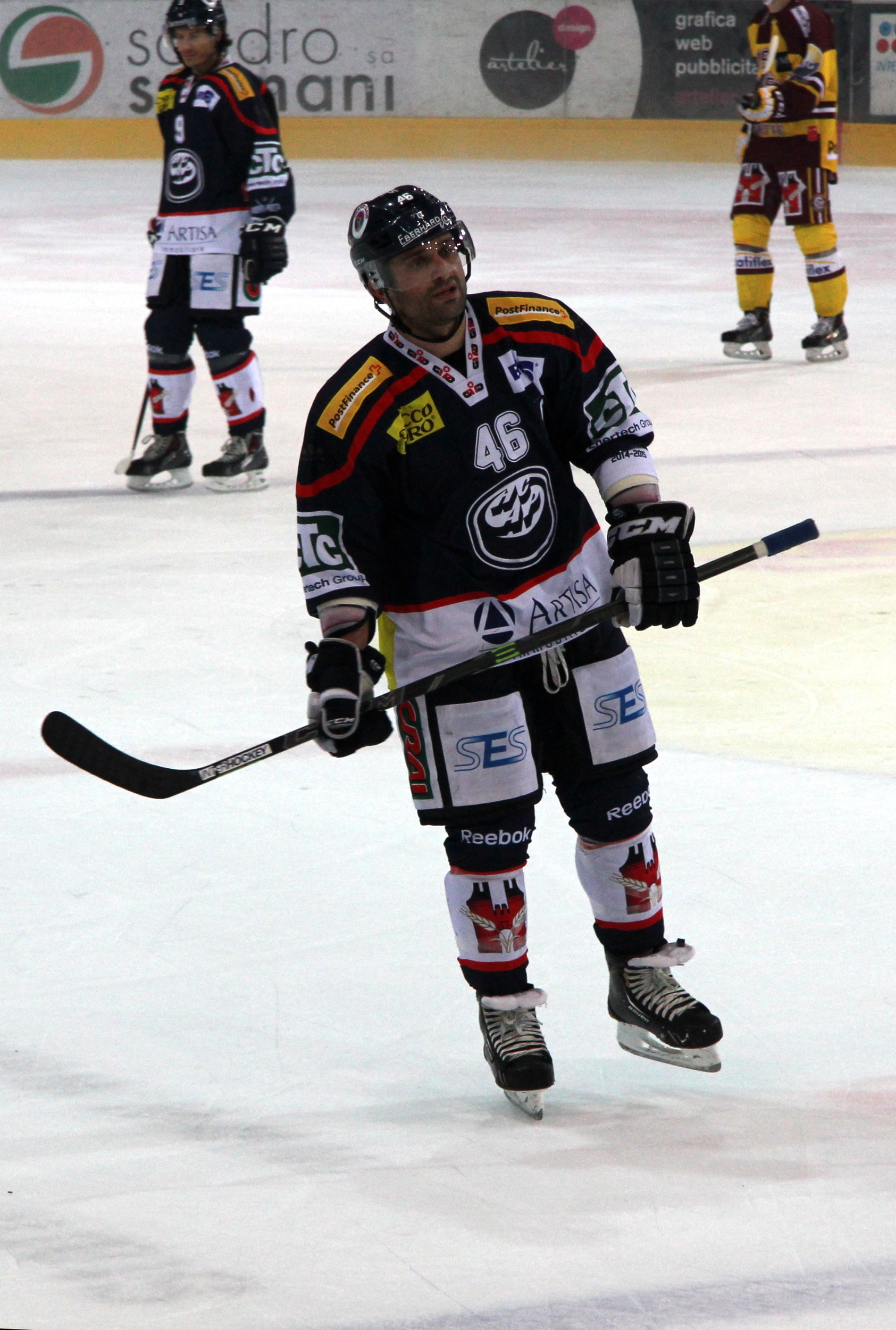
- Paolo Duca with Ambrì in 2014
- Born: June 3, 1981 (age 43); Locarno, Switzerland
- Height: 5 ft 10 in (178 cm)
- Weight: 203 lb (92 kg; 14 st 7 lb)
- Position: Forward
- Shot: Right
- Played for: HC Ambrì-Piotta; ZSC Lions; EV Zug
- National team: Switzerland
- Playing career: 1999–2017

Paolo Duca (born 3 June 1981 in Ascona) is a Swiss former professional ice hockey player who played for HC Ambrì-Piotta, ZSC Lions and EV Zug in the National League (NL), appearing in a total of 895 NL contests.

== Playing career ==
He participated in the 2010 IIHF World Championship as a member of the Switzerland men's national ice hockey team.

Duca put an end to his playing career in April 2017 and took over as sporting director of HC Ambrì-Piotta.

== Career statistics ==
			Regular season					Playoffs
Season	Team	League	GP	G	A	Pts	PIM	GP	G	A	Pts	PIM
1991–92	HC Ascona U15	Mini B	—	—	—	—	—	—	—	—	—	—
1997–98	HC Ambrì-Piotta U20	Elite Jr. A	35	18	13	31	50	—	—	—	—	—
1998–99	HC Ambrì-Piotta U20	Elite Jr. A	22	18	13	31	76	—	—	—	—	—
1998–99	HC Ambrì-Piotta	NLA	3	0	1	1	0	—	—	—	—	—
1998–99	GDT Bellinzona	SwissDiv1	—	—	—	—	—	—	—	—	—	—
1999–00	HC Ambrì-Piotta U20	Elite Jr. A	2	0	1	1	2	—	—	—	—	—
1999–00	HC Ambrì-Piotta	NLA	45	3	5	8	20	9	1	0	1	10
2000–01	HC Ambrì-Piotta U20	Elite Jr. A	2	2	0	2	0	—	—	—	—	—
2000–01	HC Ambrì-Piotta	NLA	40	3	2	5	22	—	—	—	—	—
2001–02	ZSC Lions	NLA	37	2	4	6	12	—	—	—	—	—
2001–02	GC Küsnacht Lions	NLB	6	4	4	8	2	—	—	—	—	—
2001–02	EV Zug	NLA	3	0	0	0	4	6	1	4	5	4
2002–03	EV Zug	NLA	44	7	8	15	32	—	—	—	—	—
2003–04	EV Zug	NLA	46	8	8	16	34	5	2	0	2	6
2004–05	EV Zug	NLA	37	4	7	11	45	—	—	—	—	—
2005–06	EV Zug	NLA	20	3	3	6	12	7	1	0	1	10
2006–07	EV Zug	NLA	35	7	10	17	107	9	3	1	4	4
2007–08	HC Ambrì-Piotta	NLA	50	16	25	41	74	—	—	—	—	—
2008–09	HC Ambrì-Piotta	NLA	50	18	29	47	45	—	—	—	—	—
2009–10	HC Ambrì-Piotta	NLA	50	18	21	39	40	—	—	—	—	—
2010–11	HC Ambrì-Piotta	NLA	49	8	17	25	22	—	—	—	—	—
2011–12	HC Ambrì-Piotta	NLA	33	6	8	14	8	—	—	—	—	—
2012–13	HC Ambrì-Piotta	NLA	49	4	9	13	14	—	—	—	—	—
2013–14	HC Ambrì-Piotta	NLA	49	8	6	14	18	4	0	0	0	0
2014–15	HC Ambrì-Piotta	NLA	48	5	6	11	47	—	—	—	—	—
2015–16	HC Ambrì-Piotta	NLA	41	7	10	17	24	—	—	—	—	—
2016–17	HC Ambrì-Piotta	NLA	34	2	5	7	18	—	—	—	—	—
NLA totals			763	129	184	313	598	40	8	5	13	34
