= Matias Sointu =

Finnish ice hockey player

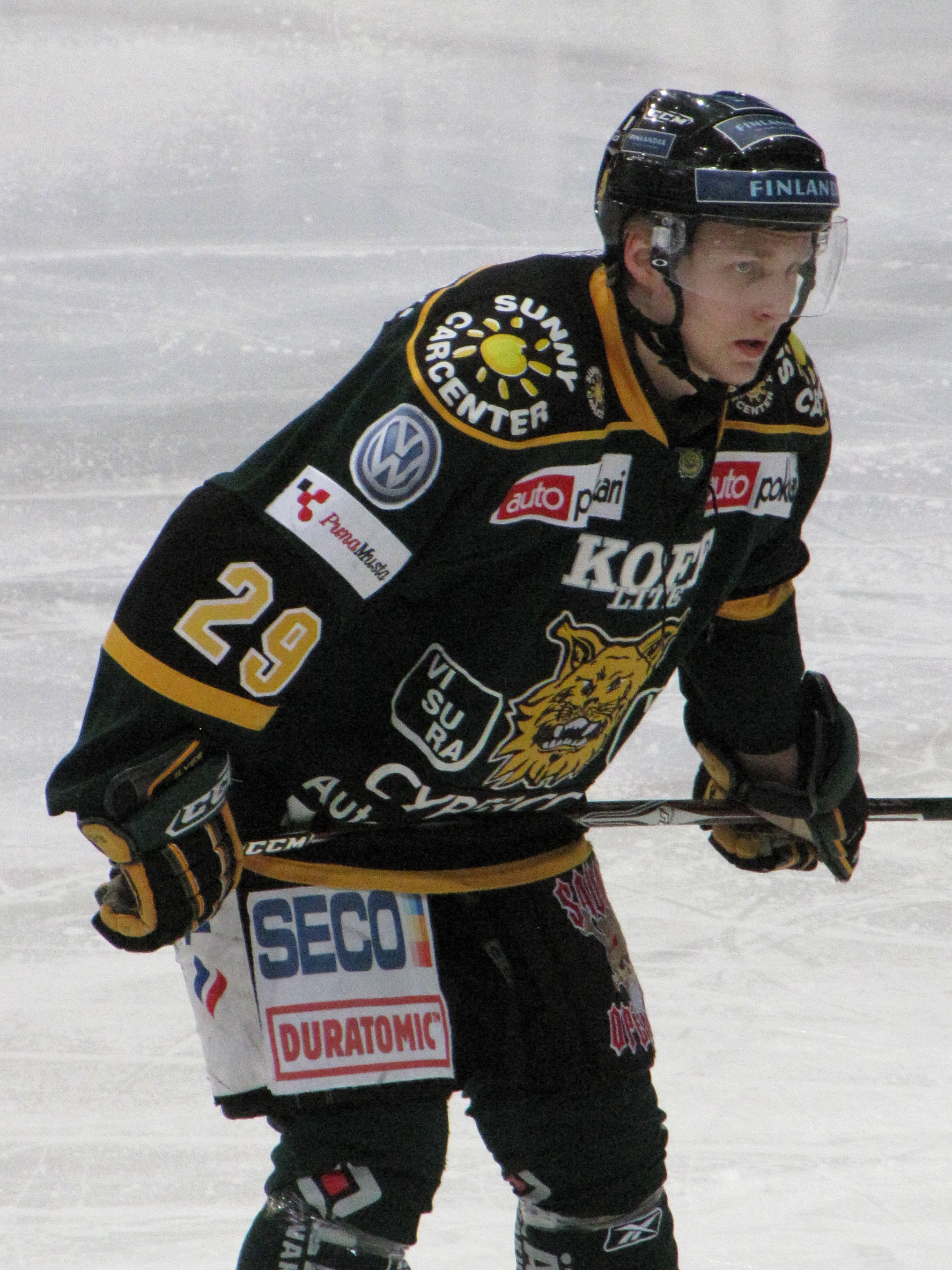
- Born: February 10, 1990 (age 36) Tampere, Finland
- Height: 5 ft 10 in (178 cm)
- Weight: 180 lb (82 kg; 12 st 12 lb)
- Position: Forward
- Shoots: Left
- Polska Hokej Liga team Former teams: Cracovia Krakow; Ilves; TPS; HC Bolzano; IK Oskarshamn; Cardiff Devils; Dornbirner EC; Kiekko-Vantaa; Graz 99ers HC La Chaux-de-Fonds; Sheffield Steelers
- NHL draft: 182nd overall, 2008; Tampa Bay Lightning
- Playing career: 2010–present

Matias Sointu (born February 10, 1990) is a Finnish professional ice hockey forward. He is currently playing with Cracovia Krakow in the Polska Hokej Liga. Sointu was selected by the Tampa Bay Lightning in the 7th round (182nd overall) of the 2008 NHL entry draft.

Sointu made his Liiga debut playing with Ilves during the 2010–11 SM-liiga season.

In the 2018–19 season, just his second year outside of Finland, Sointu played in the HockeyAllsvenskan with IK Oskarshamn. He posted 9 points in 29 games before elevating his play with 7 points in 11 games in the post-season to help Oskarshamn gain promotion to the top tier SHL. He left the club at the conclusion of his contract as a free agent.

In August 2019, Sointu signed a short-term deal with UK EIHL side Cardiff Devils as injury cover for Joey Martin. After playing nine league games, he was released in November.

He later spent time with Austrian side Dornbirner EC, before returning to Finland to join Kiekko-Vantaa.

Sointu then returned to Austria in December 2020 to sign for Austrian IceHL side Graz 99ers.

On February 25, 2021, Sointu joined HC La Chaux-de-Fonds of the Swiss League as a replacement for injured Tim Coffman for the remainder of the season.

In October 2021, Sointu returned to the UK EIHL to sign for the Sheffield Steelers, joining as the roster replacement for Travis Oleksuk.

In August 2022, Sointu joined fellow Sheffield players Vojtěch Polák and Rok Stojanovic in moving to Polish club Cracovia Krakow.
