= St. Galler Kantonalbank Arena =

Sports venue in Rapperswil, Switzerland

Coordinates: 47.223°N 8.826°E

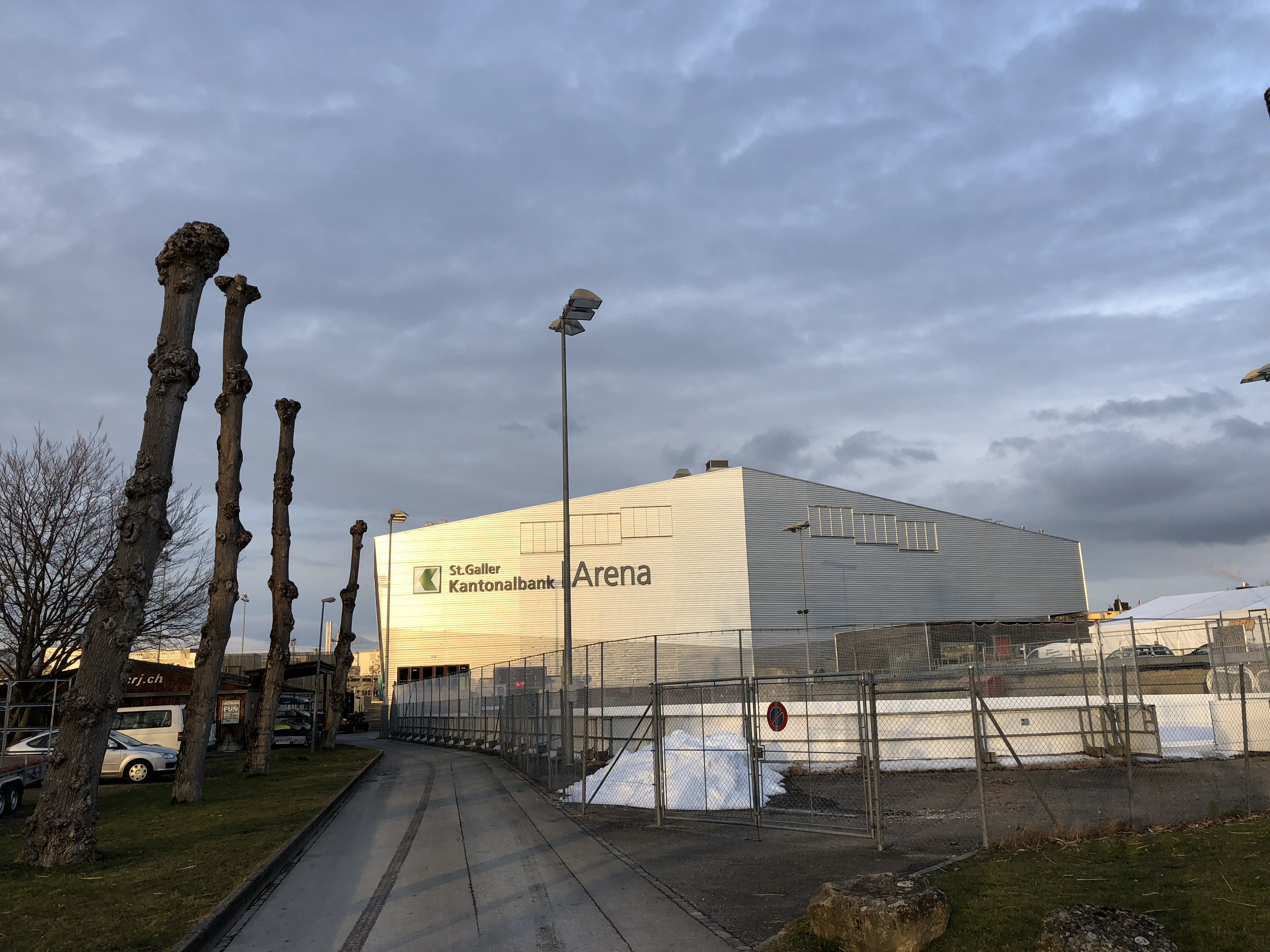
The St. Galler Kantonalbank Arena (2018)

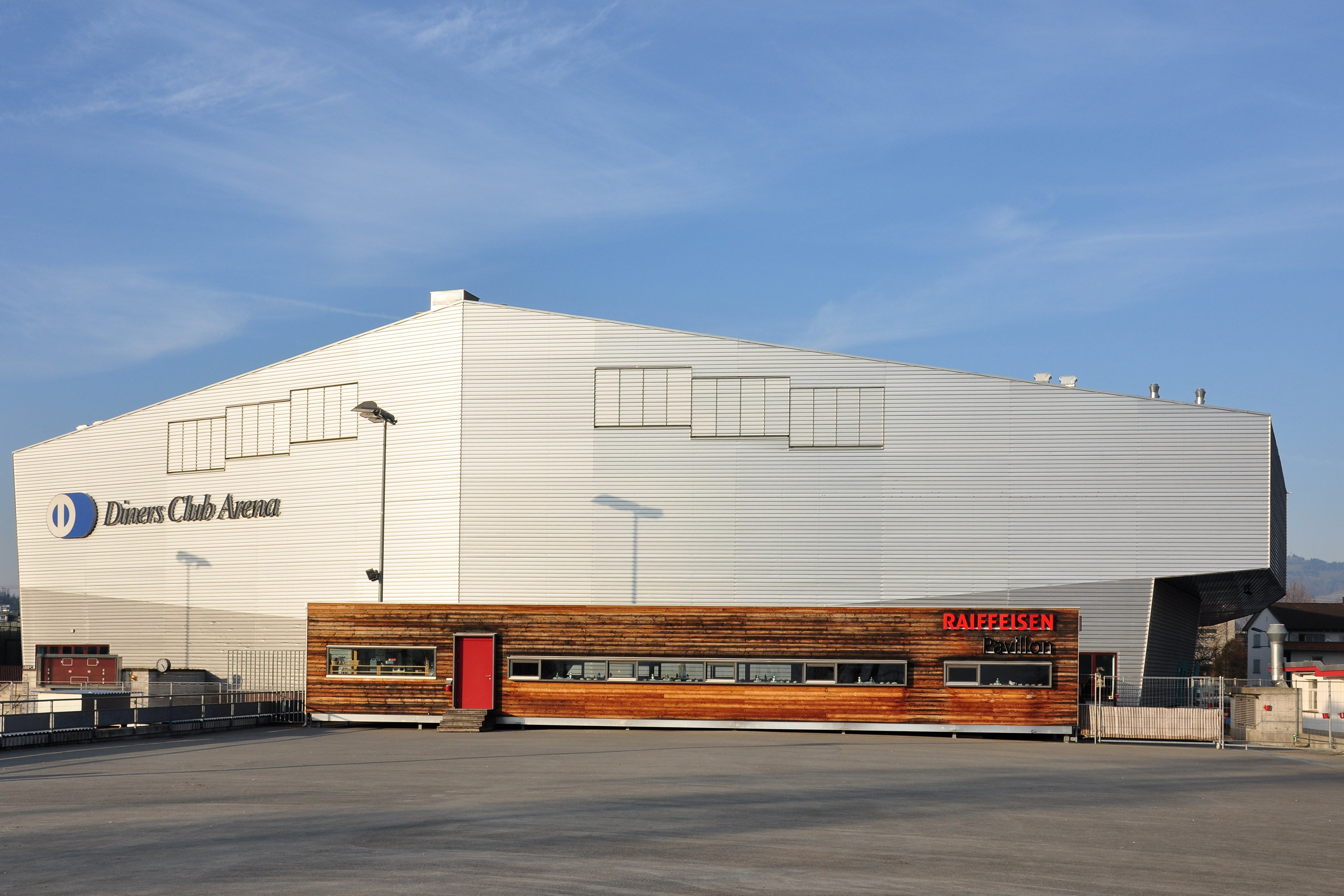
Diners Club Arena (2011)

St. Galler Kantonalbank Arena, formerly the Diners Club Arena, and originally known as Eishalle Lido, is an indoor sporting arena located in Rapperswil, Switzerland. The capacity of the arena is 6,100 and was built in 1987. It is the home arena of the Rapperswil-Jona Lakers ice hockey team. The arena was completely re-done in 2005, and changed its name following corporate sponsorship from Diners Club International. Its name was changed again in 2016 after a new sponsorship deal with naming rights was agreed with St. Galler Kantonalbank.

== See also ==
- List of indoor arenas in Switzerland
