= Patrick Obrist =

Austrian ice hockey player

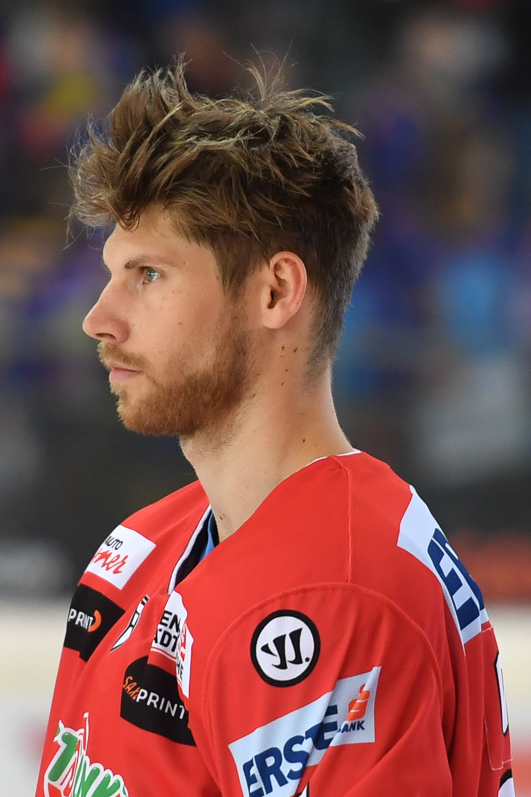
- Born: 27 February 1993 (age 32); Dornbirn, Austria
- Height: 1.85 m (6 ft 1 in)
- Weight: 90 kg (198 lb; 14 st 2 lb)
- Position: Forward
- Shoots: Left
- NL team Former teams: EHC Kloten; EC Red Bull Salzburg; SC Rapperswil-Jona Lakers
- National team: Austria
- NHL draft: Undrafted
- Playing career: 2010–present

Patrick Obrist (born 27 February 1993) is an Austrian professional ice hockey forward currently playing for EHC Kloten of the National League (NL) and the Austria men's national ice hockey team.

He represented Austria at the 2019 IIHF World Championship.
