= Swiss Cup (ice hockey) =

National ice hockey cup competition of Switzerland

The Swiss Cup was the national ice hockey cup competition of Switzerland which had been played annually from 2015 until 2021. The tournament was originally played from 1957 to 1966, then once more in 1972. On 28 May 2013, the Swiss Ice Hockey Federation announced that the cup will be revived from the 2014–15 season. At the beginning of the 2020-21 season, the SIHF announced that the 2021 edition would be the last one.

SC Bern won the final edition on February 28, 2021, against the ZSC Lions in an empty Hallenstadion.

== Champions ==
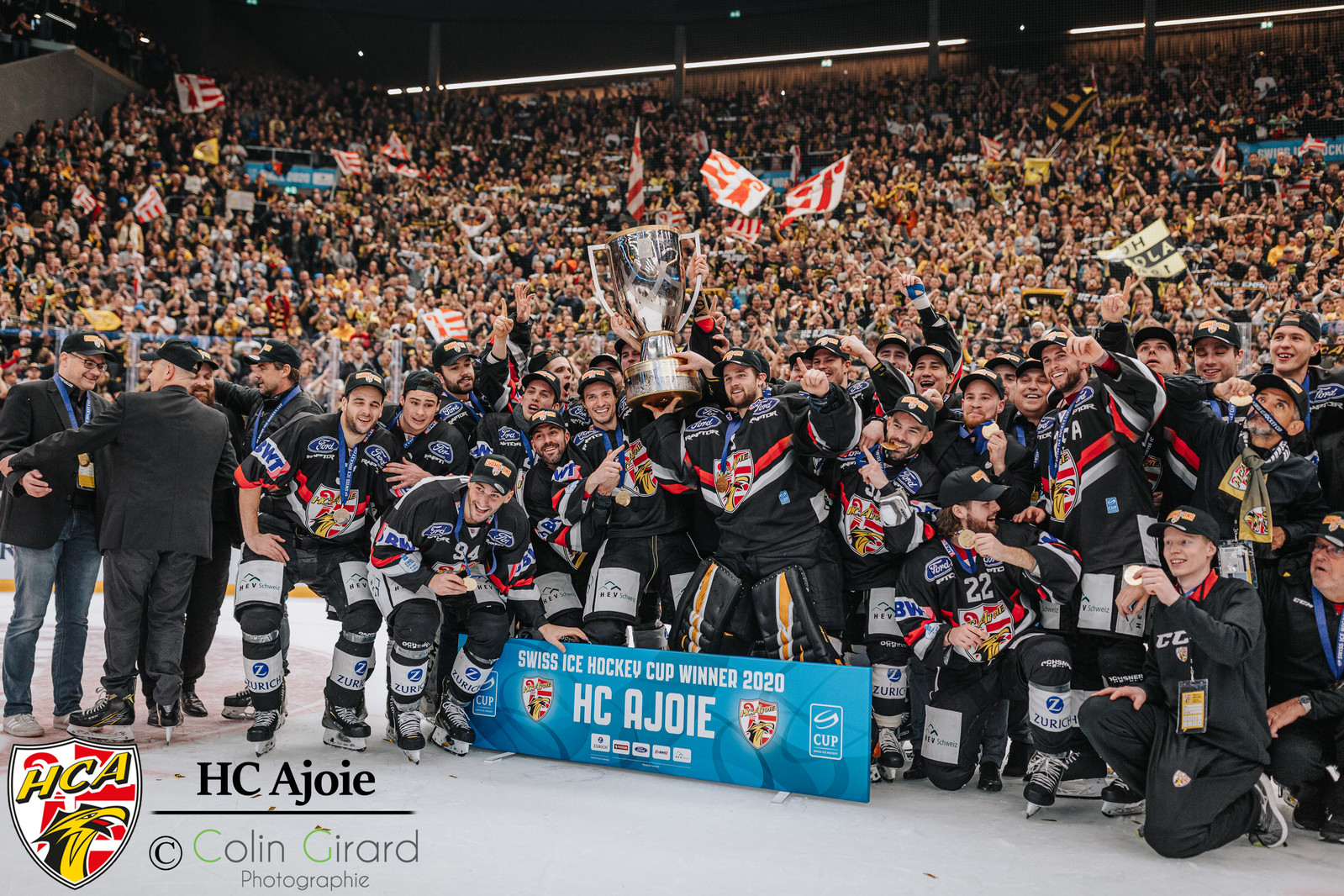
HC Ajoie 2020 Swiss Cup champion

- 1957: HC Neuchâtel Young Sprinters
- 1958: HC Neuchâtel Young Sprinters
- 1959: Genève-Servette HC
- 1960: Zürcher SC
- 1961: Zürcher SC
- 1962: HC Ambrì-Piotta
- 1963: HC Neuchâtel Young Sprinters
- 1964: EHC Visp
- 1965: SC Bern
- 1966: Grasshopper Club Zürich
- 1972: Genève-Servette HC
- 2015: SC Bern
- 2016: ZSC Lions
- 2017: EHC Kloten
- 2018: SC Rapperswil-Jona Lakers
- 2019: EV Zug
- 2020: HC Ajoie
- 2021: SC Bern

== Titles by team ==
Titles	Team	Year
3	ZSC Lions (earlier known as Zürcher SC)	1960, 1961, 2016
3	HC Neuchâtel Young Sprinters	1957, 1958, 1963
3	SC Bern	1965, 2015, 2021
2	Genève-Servette HC	1959, 1972
1	HC Ajoie	2020
1	EV Zug	2019
1	SC Rapperswil-Jona Lakers	2018
1	EHC Kloten	2017
1	HC Ambrì-Piotta	1962
1	EHC Visp	1964
1	Grasshopper Club Zürich	1966
