= HC Thurgau =

- Nickname: Löwen (The Lions)
- City: Weinfelden, Switzerland
- League: Swiss League
- Founded: 1989
- Home arena: Güttingersreuti (capacity 3,200)
- Colors
- General manager: Martin Büsser
- Head coach: Stefan Mair
- Captain: Patrick Parati
- Affiliates: HC Fribourg-Gottéron; EHC Kloten
- Website: hcthurgau.ch

Franchise history
- 1989–2014: HC Thurgau
- 2014–2017: Hockey Thurgau
- 2017–present: HC Thurgau

Hockey Club Thurgau is a Swiss professional ice hockey club based in Weinfelden, Switzerland. The club was founded in 1989 and currently plays in the Swiss League (SL) at the Güttingersreuti, with a capacity of 3,200.

== History ==
HC Thurgau emerged from the merging of clubs EHC Frauenfeld and EHC Weinfelden. With the best players of the two ice hockey clubs, both located in Canton Thurgau, were to play as HC Thurgau. With the ideal to offer hockey fans a better regional ice hockey team to compete in the national league, the club was founded in 1989. In December 1993, the EHC Kreuzlingen also merged to join HC Thurgau.

The club started its first season in 1989–90 in the Swiss 1. Liga, the third highest ice hockey league in Switzerland. Two years later, with a 8–7 finals victory against SC Langnau, Thurgau claimed its first amateur title and was promoted to the National League B.

== Players ==
=== Notable alumni ===
- Mike Posma, 1993–1997
- Rolf Schrepfer, 1993–1997, 2008–2009
- Sylvain Turgeon, 2001–2002
- Harijs Vītoliņš, 2001–2005
- Marc Savard, 2004
- Damien Brunner, 2008
- Todd Elik, 2009
- Brandon Hagel, 2020
