= 2022–23 Swiss League season =

- League: Swiss League
- Sport: Ice hockey
- Duration: September 16, 2022 – February 5, 2023
- Number of games: 225
- Number of teams: 10

Regular Season
- Season Champions: HC La Chaux-de-Fonds

Playoffs

Swiss League champion
- Champions: HC La Chaux-de-Fonds
- Runners-up: EHC Olten

Swiss League seasons
- ← 2021–22 2023–24 →

The 2022–23 Swiss League season was the 76th season of Switzerland's second tier hockey league.

== Teams ==
Swiss League teams for the 2022–23 season

Team	City	Arena	Capacity
EHC Basel	Basel	St. Jakob Arena	6,700
HC La Chaux-de-Fonds	La Chaux-de-Fonds	Patinoire des Mélèzes	7,200
GCK Lions	Küsnacht	Eishalle Küsnacht	2,800
SC Langenthal	Langenthal	Schoren Halle	4,320
EHC Olten	Olten	Kleinholz Stadion	6,500
HC Sierre	Sierre	Patinoire de Graben	4,500
Hockey Thurgau	Weinfelden	Güttingersreuti	3,100
HCB Ticino Rockets	Biasca	Pista Ghiaccio Biasca	3,800
EHC Visp	Visp	Lonza Arena	5,150
EHC Winterthur	Winterthur	Zielbau Arena	3,000

== Regular season ==
The regular season started on 16 September 2022 and ended on 5 February 2023.

Pos	Team	Pld	W	OTW	OTL	L	GF	GA	GD	Pts	Qualification
1	HC La Chaux-de-Fonds	45	30	6	3	6	205	102	+103	105	Advance to Playoffs
2	EHC Olten	45	31	3	3	8	169	99	+70	102	Advance to Playoffs
3	GCK Lions	45	19	6	5	15	150	133	+17	74	Advance to Playoffs
4	EHC Visp	45	21	3	3	18	147	141	+6	72	Advance to Playoffs
5	Hockey Thurgau	45	18	8	2	17	115	125	−10	72	Advance to Playoffs
6	EHC Basel	45	19	4	4	18	137	125	+12	69	Advance to Playoffs
7	SC Langenthal	45	18	3	7	17	147	154	−7	67	Advance to Playoffs
8	HC Sierre	45	16	5	3	21	142	159	−17	61	Advance to Playoffs
9	EHC Winterthur	45	6	2	5	32	105	190	−85	27	
10	HCB Ticino Rockets	45	6	1	6	32	93	182	−89	26	

Source: Swiss League
Rules for classification: 1) points; 2) a higher number of wins in the regular time; 3) a higher number of wins in overtime and shootouts; 4) goal difference; 5) number of goals scored; 6) drawing of lots.

=== Statistics ===
==== Scoring leaders ====
The following shows the top ten players who led the league in points, at the conclusion of the regular season. If two or more skaters are tied (i.e. same number of points, goals and played games), all of the tied skaters are shown.

Player	Team	GP	G	A	Pts	+/–	PIM
(Latvia) Toms Andersons	HC La Chaux-de-Fonds	45	18	47	65	+27	20
(Austria) Oliver Achermann	HC La Chaux-de-Fonds	38	33	27	60	+35	8
(Switzerland) Arnaud Montandon	HC Sierre	45	25	35	60	+2	30
(Canada) Sean Collins	EHC Olten	44	27	30	57	+38	24
(Canada) Jakob Stukel	EHC Basel	45	29	25	54	+15	30
(Denmark) Felix Maegaard Scheel	EHC Visp	42	18	35	53	-2	41
(Latvia) Haralds Egle	SC Langenthal	41	14	37	51	+7	6
(Slovakia) Stanislav Horanský	EHC Olten	33	17	32	49	+30	24
(Canada) Matt Wilkins	HC La Chaux-de-Fonds	43	17	31	48	-16	36
(Switzerland) Kay Schweri	HC La Chaux-de-Fonds	44	9	39	48	+21	4

==== Leading goaltenders ====
The following shows the top five goaltenders who led the league in goals against average, provided that they have played at least 40% of their team's minutes, at the conclusion of the regular season.

Player	Team(s)	GP	TOI	GA	Sv%	GAA
(Sweden) Viktor Östlund	HC La Chaux-de-Fonds	33	1900:22	60	93.32	1.89
(Switzerland) Lucas Rötheli	EHC Olten	26	1496:39	51	91.39	2.04
(Switzerland) Andri Henauer	EHC Basel	27	1622:19	63	93.49	2.33
(Switzerland) Bryan Rüegger	Hockey Thurgau	30	1646:44	80	90.27	2.91
(Switzerland) Matteo Ritz	EHC Visp	21	1166:32	58	89.93	2.98

== Playoffs ==
=== Bracket ===
Quarter-Finals
1	HC La Chaux-de-Fonds	4
8	HC Sierre	1
2	EHC Olten	4
7	SC Langenthal	1
(Pairings are reseeded after the first round)
3	GCK Lions	4
6	EHC Basel	2
4	EHC Visp	2
5	HC Thurgau	4

Semi-Finals
1	HC La Chaux-de-Fonds	4
6	HC Thurgau	5
2	EHC Olten	4
3	GCK Lions	1

Finals
1	HC La Chaux-de-Fonds	4
2	EHC Olten	0

=== Quarter-Finals ===
==== (1) HC La Chaux-de-Fonds vs. (8) HC Sierre ====
14 February	HC La Chaux-de-Fonds	5-2	HC Sierre	Patinoire des Mélèzes, La Chaux-de-Fonds	Recap
No scoring		First period	18:05 - Bougro (Castonguay Castonguay, M. Montandon) (SH1)
Achermann (Olden, Andersons) - 7:16; Olden (Andersons, Huguenin) (PP1) - 11:59		Second period	No scoring
Achermann (Andersons, Olden) - 0:21; Schweri - 13:26; Olden (Andersons, Jaquet) (EN) - 17:27		Third period	0:00 - Y. Berthoud (Heinimann, Perron)
Viktor Östlund ( 27 saves / 29 shots )		Goalie stats	Remo Giovannini ( 36 saves / 40 shots )

16 February	HC Sierre	1-2	OT	HC La Chaux-de-Fonds	Patinoire de Graben, Sierre	Recap
No scoring		First period		No scoring
Olden (Huguenin, Carbis) (PP1)- 6:41		Second period		No scoring
No scoring		Third period		Volejnicek (Bernazzi, Bonvin) - 11:41
No scoring		First overtime period		Achermann (Vogel, Olden))- 9:28
Remo Giovannini ( 50 saves / 52 shots )		Goalie stats		Viktor Östlund ( 13 saves / 14 shots )

18 February	HC La Chaux-de-Fonds	8-2	HC Sierre	Patinoire des Mélèzes, La Chaux-de-Fonds	Recap
Achermann (Olden, Andersons) - 8:43		First period	10:10 - Riat (Y. Berthoud)
Achermann (Olden) (PP2) - 1:08; Petrini (Schweri, Bengtsson) (PP1) - 1:50; Olden (SH1) - 5:43; Dubois (Östlund) - 12:31; Suter (Eugster, Fuhrer) - 13:29; Olden (Huguenin, Andersons) (PP1) - 13:47		Second period	No scoring
Petrini (Bengtsson, Schweri) - 9:12		Third period	10:00 - A. Montandon (Castonguay)
Viktor Östlund ( 32 saves / 34 shots )		Goalie stats	Remo Giovannini ( 24 saves / 29 shots ) Noah In-Albon ( 19 saves / 22 shots )

20 February	HC Sierre	4-2	HC La Chaux-de-Fonds	Patinoire de Graben, Sierre	Recap
10:07 - Jobin (Riat, Maret)		First period	Dubois (Privet) - 11:30 S. Berthoud (Vouardoux, Bonvin) - 12:18
10:05 - Karaffa (Perrenoud, Vouardoux)		Second period	Achermann (Andersons, In-Albon) - 14:34
No scoring		Third period	Jobin (Riat, Giovannini) (EN) - 18:51
Remo Giovannini ( 42 saves / 44 shots )		Goalie stats	Viktor Östlund ( 25 saves / 28 shots )

22 February	HC La Chaux-de-Fonds	9-5	HC Sierre	Patinoire des Mélèzes, La Chaux-de-Fonds	Recap
Olden (Andersons, Huguenin) - 0:26; Carbis (Privet, Dubois) - 4:32; Andersons (Jaquet, Achermann) - 5:06; Achermann (Carbis, Olden) (PP1) - 10:02		First period	12:21 - Dozin (Jobin, Riat); 17:44 - Castonguay (Bougro, Volejnicek) (PP1)
Andersons (Huguenin, Carbis) (PP1) - 9:03; Privet (SH1) - 14:48		Second period	9:31 - Jobin; 18:43 - Perron (Castonguay)
Andersons (Achermann, Damian Gehringer) - 8:02; Dubois (Achermann) (EN) - 15:52; Olden (Matewa, Andersons) (EN) - 16:27		Third period	6:20 - Perron
Viktor Östlund ( 27 saves / 32 shots )		Goalie stats	Remo Giovannini ( 19 saves / 26 shots )

HC La Chaux-de-Fonds won the series 4–1

==== (2) EHC Olten vs. (7) SC Langenthal ====
14 February	EHC Olten	2-5	SC Langenthal	Kleinholz Stadion, Olten	Recap
No scoring		First period	4:00 - Higgins (Whitney, Aeschlimann); 11:16 - Kläy (Füglister, Řehák)
Sterchi (Kast, Spiller) - 6:31; Kast (Sterchi, Antonietti) - 8:23		Second period	8:49 - Hess (Whitney, Aeschlimann)
No scoring		Third period	9:48 - Whitney (PP1); 19:43 - Kämpf (Kummer) (EN)
Lucas Rötheli ( 24 saves / 28 shots )		Goalie stats	Elien Paupe ( 33 saves / 35 shots )

16 February	SC Langenthal	2-3	OT	EHC Olten	Schoren Halle, Langenthal	Recap
No scoring		First period		Oejdemark (Sterchi, Spiller) - 15:48
12:36 - Aeschlimann (Egle, Whitney)		Second period		Kast (Spiller, Scheidegger) - 17:44
16:41 - Whitney (Kummer, Müller) (PP1)		Third period		No scoring
No scoring		First overtime period		Sterchi (Kast, Spiller) - 4:33
Elien Paupe ( 24 saves / 27 shots )		Goalie stats		Lucas Rötheli ( 31 saves / 33 shots )

18 February	EHC Olten	4-1	SC Langenthal	Kleinholz Stadion, Olten	Recap
No scoring		First period	No scoring
Puide (Scheidegger, Antonietti) - 8:31; Lhoták (Rapuzzi, Hächler) - 10:05		Second period	No scoring
Spiller (Sterchi, Kast) - 18:26; Mosimann (Weder) (EN) - 18:50		Third period	Aeschbach (Kummer) (SH1)- 6:43
Lucas Rötheli ( 30 saves / 31 shots )		Goalie stats	Elien Paupe ( 24 saves / 27 shots )

20 February	SC Langenthal	2-5	EHC Olten	Schoren Halle, Langenthal	Recap
15:56 - Spiller (Kast, Sterchi)		First period	No scoring
11:27 - Lhoták (Collins, Scheidegger); 19:09 - Wyss (Weder, Mosimann)		Second period	No scoring
1:10 - Whitney (Küng, Müller); 7:26 - Kämpf (Aeschlimann, Egle)		Third period	Lhoták (Leeger, Oejdemark) - 9:46; Mosimann (Collins) (EN) - 19:44
Elien Paupe ( 31 saves / 35 shots )		Goalie stats	Lucas Rötheli ( 30 saves / 32 shots )

22 February	EHC Olten	5-2	SC Langenthal	Kleinholz Stadion, Olten	Recap
Collins (Nunn, Scheidegger) (PP1)- 18:27		First period	7:18 - Salzgeber; 15:30 - Kämpf (Kummer) (PP1)
Hüsler (Antonietti) - 5:39		Second period	No scoring
Nunn (Scheidegger, Collins) (PP1)- 5:01; Schmuckli (Kast, Hüsler) - 5:43; Hüsler (SH1, EN)- 17:14		Third period	No scoring
Lucas Rötheli ( 27 saves / 29 shots )		Goalie stats	Elien Paupe ( 30 saves / 34 shots )

EHC Olten won the series 4–1

==== (3) GCK Lions vs. (6) EHC Basel ====
14 February	GCK Lions	3-1	EHC Basel	Eishalle Küsnacht, Küsnacht	Recap
No scoring		First period	No scoring
Baechler (Henry, Backman) - 10:32		Second period	No scoring
Kärki (Meier, Blaser) - 13:56; Henry (Mettler) (EN) - 18:45		Third period	0:25 - Büsser (Supinski, Stukel)
Robin Zumbühl ( 30 saves / 31 shots )		Goalie stats	Andri Henauer ( 36 saves / 38 shots )

16 February	EHC Basel	6-1	GCK Lions	St. Jakob Arena, Basel	Recap
5:01 - Muller (Kiss, Zubler) (PP1) 14:11 - Schwab (Alihodzic, Bachofner)		First period	No scoring
No scoring		Second period	No scoring
2:52 - Supinski (Stukel, Bachofner); 10:47 - Muller (Warmbrodt); 13:02 - Schwab (Rexha); 16:23 - Stukel (Muller, Supinski) (PP1)		Third period	Graf (Truog, Meier) (PP1) - 1:46
Andri Henauer ( 33 saves / 34 shots )		Goalie stats	Robin Zumbühl ( 19 saves / 25 shots )

18 February	GCK Lions	1-2	EHC Basel	Eishalle Küsnacht, Küsnacht	Recap
No scoring		First period	15:57 - Supinski (Stukel, Kiss) (PP1)
Diem (Büsser, Backman) - 14:26		Second period	No scoring
No scoring		Third period	17:13 - Stukel (PP1)
Robin Zumbühl ( 20 saves / 22 shots )		Goalie stats	Andri Henauer ( 25 saves / 26 shots )

20 February	EHC Basel	3-4	GCK Lions	St. Jakob Arena, Basel	Recap
No scoring		First period	Henry (Büsser, Backman) - 16:03; Henry (Reichle, Burger) - 18:00; Diem (Backman, Burger) - 19:47
7:35 - Supinski (Schwab); 9:46 - Rexha (Brügger, Nater) (PP1)		Second period	Truog (Melnalksnis, Sējējs) - 19:52
13:39 - Stukel (Zubler, Brügger) (PP1)		Third period	No scoring
Andri Henauer ( 10 saves / 13 shots ) Fabio Haller ( 19 saves / 20 shots )		Goalie stats	Robin Zumbühl ( 25 saves / 28 shots )

22 February	GCK Lions	4-3	OT	EHC Basel	Eishalle Küsnacht, Küsnacht	Recap
Blaser (Backman, Truog) (PP1) - 2:34		First period		15:38 - Brügger (Schwab, Büsser)
Diem (Backman, Hinterkircher) - 0:52; Henry (Diem) - 3:33		Second period		7:10 - Schwarzenbach (Schwab, Warmbrodt) (PP1)
No scoring		Third period		14:32 - Schwab (Rexha)
Henry - 18:43		First overtime period		No scoring
Robin Zumbühl ( 30 saves / 33 shots )		Goalie stats		Andri Henauer ( 54 saves / 58 shots )

24 February	EHC Basel	4-5	OT	GCK Lions	St. Jakob Arena, Basel	Recap
10:10 - Nater (PP1)		First period		Blaser (Henry, Backman) (PP1) - 4:22; Büsser (Melnalksnis) - 11:56; Backman (Diem, Guebey) - 18:37
2:32 - Cavalleri; 11:08 - Supinski (Schwarzenbach, Muller)		Second period		No scoring
18:57 - Alihodzic (Stukel, Zubler) (PP1)		Third period		Backman (Schlagenhauf, Reichle) (PP1) - 7:37
No scoring		First overtime period		Kärki (Truog, Melnalksnis) - 3:31
Andri Henauer ( 36 saves / 41 shots )		Goalie stats		Robin Zumbühl ( 16 saves / 20 shots )

GCK Lions won the series 4–2

==== (4) EHC Visp vs. (5) Hockey Thurgau ====
14 February	EHC Visp	3-4	Hockey Thurgau	Lonza Arena, Visp	Recap
No scoring		First period	19:21 - Binias (Rundqvist, Lehmann) (PP1)
Forget (Merola, Heinen) - 9:14; Forget (Chiriaev, Gähler) (PP1) - 14:41		Second period	17:26 - Christensen (Spannring, Kühni)
Bogdanoff - 40:57		Third period	10:43 - Lehmann (Rundqvist); 17:57 - Forrer (Spannring, Christensen)
Alex Caffi ( 26 saves / 30 shots )		Goalie stats	Luis Janett ( 24 saves / 27 shots )

16 February	Hockey Thurgau	1-4	EHC Visp	Güttingersreuti, Weinfelden	Recap
No scoring		First period	Wüest (Merola, Gähler) (PP1) - 5:38 Chiriaev (Gähler, Forget) (PP1) - 18:36
26:49 - Elo (Lehmann, Rundqvist)		Second period	Ritz (Heinen, Bogdanoff) - 28:07
No scoring		Third period	Wüthrich (PP1) - 18:40
Luis Janett ( 32 saves / 36 shots )		Goalie stats	Alex Caffi ( 35 saves / 36 shots )

18 February	EHC Visp	5-2	Hockey Thurgau	Lonza Arena, Visp	Recap
No scoring		First period	2:56 - Hobi (Christensen, Rundqvist); 9:55 - Binias (Jolliet, Etter)
Riatsch (Ritz) - 7:23; Wüest (Furrer, Heinen) - 12:12; Eigenmann (Wüthrich) - 12:42		Second period	No scoring
Mäder (Kuonen, Burke) (PP1) - 17:15; Burke (Maegaard Scheel) (EN) - 18:06		Third period	No scoring
Alex Caffi ( 33 saves / 35 shots )		Goalie stats	Luis Janett ( 32 saves / 36 shots )

20 February	Hockey Thurgau	2-1	EHC Visp	Güttingersreuti, Weinfelden	Recap
No scoring		First period	No scoring
12:21 - Berri 14:06 - Elo (Schmutz, Lehmann)		Second period	No scoring
No scoring		Third period	Wüthrich (Eigenmann, Langenegger) - 2:50
Luis Janett ( 29 saves / 30 shots )		Goalie stats	Alex Caffi ( 23 saves / 25 shots )

22 February	EHC Visp	1-5	Hockey Thurgau	Lonza Arena, Visp	Recap
No scoring		First period	1:41 - Hollenstein (Loosli, Döpfner)
No scoring		Second period	2:27 - Lehmann (Stehli, Elo); 14:18 - Berri (Jolliet, Schmutz)
Eigenmann (Maegaard Scheel, Mäder) (PP1) - 15:55		Third period	6:35 - Lehmann (Döpfner) (SH1); 14:59 - Hollenstein (Elo)
Alex Caffi ( 18 saves / 23 shots )		Goalie stats	Luis Janett ( 38 saves / 39 shots )

24 February	Hockey Thurgau	5-0	EHC Visp	Güttingersreuti, Weinfelden	Recap
9:08 - Berri (Pelletier, Parati); 19:16 - Hollenstein (Döpfner) (SH1)		First period	No scoring
15:14 - Elo (Rundqvist, Hobi) (PP1)		Second period	No scoring
0:35 - Spannring (Hobi, Rundqvist) (PP1); 11:32 - Forrer (SH1, EN)		Third period	No scoring
Luis Janett ( 30 saves / 30 shots )		Goalie stats	Alex Caffi ( 24 saves / 28 shots )

Hockey Thurgau won the series 4–2

=== Semi-Finals ===
==== (1) HC La Chaux-de-Fonds vs. (5) HC Thurgau ====
28 February	HC La Chaux-de-Fonds	2-1	HC Thurgau	Patinoire des Mélèzes, La Chaux-de-Fonds	Recap
Fuhrer (Wilkins, Schweri) (PP1) - 3:39		First period	No scoring
No scoring		Second period	19:22 - Elo (Forrer, Rundqvist)
Fuhrer (Schweri, In-Albon) (PP1) - 9:23		Third period	No scoring
Viktor Östlund ( 25 saves / 26 shots )		Goalie stats	Luis Janett ( 34 saves / 36 shots )

2 March	HC Thurgau	6-5	HC La Chaux-de-Fonds	Güttingersreuti, Weinfelden	Recap
11:30 - Hollenstein (Loosli, Döpfner)		First period	Wilkins (Schweri) - 0:57; Olden (Achermann, Jaquet) - 10:27
1:47 - Hobi (Pelletier, Elo) (PP1); 17:05 - Wilkins (Olden, Schweri)		Second period	Stehli (Pelletier, Rundqvist) - 15:09
14:44 - Schmutz (Elo, Stehli); 15:43 - Hobi (Spannring, Rundqvist) (PP1); 18:58 - Kühni (Hobi) (EN)		Third period	Achermann (Andersons, In-Albon) - 5:14; Rüegsegger (Petrini, Carbis) - 19:27
Luis Janett ( 28 saves / 33 shots )		Goalie stats	Viktor Östlund ( 22 saves / 27 shots )

4 March	HC La Chaux-de-Fonds	7-0	HC Thurgau	Patinoire des Mélèzes, La Chaux-de-Fonds	Recap
Huguenin (Andersons, Olden) - 2:15; Olden (Andersons, Huguenin) (PP1) - 10:03; Fuhrer (Suter, Eugster) - 11:08; Olden (Andersons, Huguenin) (PP1) - 17:58		First period	No scoring
Dubois (Colin Fontana) - 8:45; Fuhrer (Wilkins, In-Albon) (PP1) - 14:04; Andersons (Achermann, Matewa) - 15:43		Second period	No scoring
No scoring		Third period	No scoring
Viktor Östlund ( 19 saves / 19 shots )		Goalie stats	Luis Janett ( 11 saves / 15 shots ) Bryan Rüegger ( 23 saves / 26 shots )

7 March	HC Thurgau	2-4	HC La Chaux-de-Fonds	Güttingersreuti, Weinfelden	Recap
No scoring		First period	Wilkins (Dubois) - 10:03; Olden (Huguenin, Andersons) (PP1) - 19:54
No scoring		Second period	No scoring
2:23 - Binias (Hobi, Schmutz); 16:28 - Stehli (Ganz, Elo)		Third period	Eugster (SH1) - 6:57; Achermann (Andersons, Olden) (EN) - 18:52
Luis Janett ( 31 saves / 34 shots )		Goalie stats	Viktor Östlund ( 30 saves / 32 shots )

9 March	HC La Chaux-de-Fonds	5-1	HC Thurgau	Patinoire des Mélèzes, La Chaux-de-Fonds	Recap
Andersons (Olden, Achermann) - 8:12; Achermann (Olden, Huguenin) - 11:56		First period	No scoring
Huguenin (Wilkins, Rüegsegger) - 9:12; Petrini (Olden, In-Albon) (PP1) - 17:11		Second period	No scoring
Fuhrer (Eugster, Dubois) - 14:20		Third period	16:34 - Janett (Hobi, Kühni)
Viktor Östlund ( 29 saves / 30 shots )		Goalie stats	Bryan Rüegger ( 45 saves / 48 shots )

HC La Chaux-de-Fonds won the series 4–1

==== (2) EHC Olten vs. (3) GCK Lions ====
28 February	EHC Olten	4-3	GCK Lions	Kleinholz Stadion, Olten	Recap
Schmuckli (Spiller) - 16:29		First period	4:35 - Backman (Blaser); 11:18 - Diem (Backman, Hinterkircher)
Lhoták - 19:26		Second period	6:44 - Mettler (Reichle, Burger)
Oejdemark (Bircher, Haussener) - 8:39; Sterchi (Kast, Spiller) - 18:40		Third period	No scoring
Lucas Rötheli ( 14 saves / 17 shots )		Goalie stats	Robin Zumbühl ( 24 saves / 28 shots )

2 March	GCK Lions	2-3	EHC Olten	Eishalle Küsnacht, Küsnacht	Recap
No scoring		First period	No scoring
1:16 - Kärki (Büsser, Diem) (PP1); 15:35 - Reichle (Henry, Schlagenhauf)		Second period	Lhoták (Nunn, Collins) (PP1) - 0:43; Bircher (Weder) - 1:54; Sterchi (Kast, Hüsler) - 7:35
No scoring		Third period	No scoring
Robin Zumbühl ( 17 saves / 19 shots ) Sascha Ruppelt ( 19 saves / 20 shots )		Goalie stats	Lucas Rötheli ( 11 saves / 13 shots )

4 March	EHC Olten	5-4	OT	GCK Lions	Kleinholz Stadion, Olten
Sterchi (Spiller, Kast) - 4:10		First period		0:31 - Kärki (Mettler, Backman)
Sterchi (Kast, Spiller) - 1:42		Second period		11:20 - Büsser (Backman, Henry) (PP1); 15:28 - Mettler (Backman, Dominic Buchli)
Spiller (Kast, Scheidegger) - 19:05; Spiller (Kast, Collins) - 19:32		Third period		5:25 - Kärki (Backman, Mettler)
Kast (Bircher) - 3:41		First overtime period		No scoring
Lucas Rötheli ( 23 saves / 27 shots )		Goalie stats		Sascha Ruppelt ( 34 saves / 39 shots )

7 March	GCK Lions	4-3	EHC Olten	Eishalle Küsnacht, Küsnacht	Recap
11:03 - Graf (Truog, Diem)		First period	Hüsler (Puide, Hächler) - 2:18
16:05 - Schlagenhauf (Backman, Henry)		Second period	Mosimann (Schmuckli, De Nisco) - 2:38; Sterchi (Leeger, Kast) - 3:56
14:38 - Graf (Henry, Kärki); 19:33 - Burger (Diem, Zumbühl)		Third period	No scoring
Sascha Ruppelt ( 11 saves / 14 shots ) Robin Zumbühl ( 15 saves / 15 shots )		Goalie stats	Lucas Rötheli ( 20 saves / 24 shots )

9 March	EHC Olten	2-0	GCK Lions	Kleinholz Stadion, Olten	Recap
No scoring		First period	No scoring
Mosimann (Wyss, De Nisco) - 17:04		Second period	No scoring
Hüsler (Kast) (EN) - 19:49		Third period	No scoring
Lucas Rötheli ( 22 saves / 22 shots )		Goalie stats	Robin Zumbühl ( 26 saves / 27 shots )

EHC Olten won the series 4–1

=== Finals ===
15 March	HC La Chaux-de-Fonds	3-2	OT	EHC Olten	Patinoire des Mélèzes, La Chaux-de-Fonds	Recap
No scoring		First period		4:47 - Weder (Hüsler, Lhoták)
Privet (Huguenin, Petrini) - 16:36 Olden (Achermann) - 18:01		Second period		8:20 - De Nisco (Wyss, Mosimann)
No scoring		Third period		No scoring
Andersons (Huguenin, Olden) (PP1) - 2:12		First overtime period		No scoring
Viktor Östlund ( 26 saves / 28 shots )		Goalie stats		Lucas Rötheli ( 29 saves / 32 shots )

17 March	EHC Olten	1-3	HC La Chaux-de-Fonds	Kleinholz Stadion, Olten	Recap
No scoring		First period	No scoring
4:07 - Kast (Spiller, Leeger)		Second period	Olden (Achermann, Andersons) - 8:39; Fuhrer (In-Albon) (PP1) - 14:38; Achermann (Huguenin, Andersons) (PP1) - 16:56
No scoring		Third period	No scoring
Lucas Rötheli ( 21 saves / 24 shots )		Goalie stats	Viktor Östlund ( 24 saves / 25 shots )

19 March	HC La Chaux-de-Fonds	3-2	OT	EHC Olten	Patinoire des Mélèzes, La Chaux-de-Fonds	Recap
Olden (Boss) - 6:14		First period		No scoring
No scoring		Second period		14:33 - Lhoták (Collins)
Achermann (Carbis, Olden) (PP1) - 11:03		Third period		19:17 - Kast (Rapuzzi, Sterchi) (PP1)
Rüegsegger (Wilkins) - 5:10		First overtime period		No scoring
Viktor Östlund ( 28 saves / 30 shots )		Goalie stats		Dominic Nyffeler ( 33 saves / 36 shots )

21 March	EHC Olten	0-2	HC La Chaux-de-Fonds	Kleinholz Stadion, Olten	Recap
No scoring		First period	Carbis (Andersons, Olden) (PP1) - 17:40
No scoring		Second period	In-Albon (Schweri, Wilkins) (PP1) - 7:41
No scoring		Third period	No scoring
Dominic Nyffeler ( 29 saves / 31 shots )		Goalie stats	Viktor Östlund ( 33 saves / 33 shots )

HC La Chaux-de-Fonds won the series 4–0

== Leagues Qualification ==
30 March	HC Ajoie	2-3	HC La Chaux-de-Fonds	Raiffeisen Arena, Porrentruy	Recap
Hazen (Devos, Rouiller) - 12:43		First period	3:20 - Schweri (Rüegsegger, In-Albon); 11:01 - Andersons (Olden, Huguenin)
No scoring		Second period	No scoring
Derungs (Kohler, Rouiller) - 59:41		Third period	57:15 - Olden (Achermann, Gehringer) (SH1)
Damiano Ciaccio ( 27 saves / 30 shots )		Goalie stats	Viktor Östlund ( 24 saves / 26 shots )

1 April	HC La Chaux-de-Fonds	4-1	HC Ajoie	Patinoire des Mélèzes, La Chaux-de-Fonds	Recap
4:41 - Bengtsson (Wilkins, Schweri)		First period	Frossard (Bakoš, Thiry) - 16:30
1:16 - Olden (Suter, Eugster) (SH1); 7:54 - Carbis (Andersons, Olden) (PP1)		Second period	No scoring
19:15 - Andersons (Bengtsson, Wilkins) (PP1, EN)		Third period	No scoring
Viktor Östlund ( 29 saves / 30 shots )		Goalie stats	Tim Wolf ( 21 saves / 24 shots )

4 April	HC Ajoie	3-2	2OT	HC La Chaux-de-Fonds	Raiffeisen Arena, Porrentruy	Recap
No scoring		First period		4:58 - Achermann (Olden, Andersons)
Birbaum (Sciaroni, Hauert) - 16:49 Asselin (Frossard) - 19:12		Second period		11:23 - Fuhrer (Topping)
No scoring		Third period		No scoring
Hauert (Rundqvist, Bakoš) - 32:54		Second overtime period		No scoring
Tim Wolf ( 48 saves / 50 shots )		Goalie stats		Viktor Östlund ( 58 saves / 61 shots )

6 April	HC La Chaux-de-Fonds	1-4	HC Ajoie	Patinoire des Mélèzes, La Chaux-de-Fonds	Recap
No scoring		First period	No scoring
15:32 - Topping (Fuhrer, Bengtsson)		Second period	Brennan (Rundqvist, Asselin) (PP1) - 1:13 Brennan (Arnold) - 7:58
No scoring		Third period	Frossard - 4:59 Romanenghi (Bozon, Rundqvist) (EN) - 17:45
Viktor Östlund ( 37 saves / 40 shots )		Goalie stats	Tim Wolf ( 31 saves / 32 shots )

8 April	HC Ajoie	2-1	HC La Chaux-de-Fonds	Raiffeisen Arena, Porrentruy	Recap
Asselin (SH1, PS) - 1:17		First period	No scoring
Frossard (Asselin, Brennan) - 4:21		Second period	No scoring
No scoring		Third period	19:30 - Bengtsson (Andersons, Achermann)
Tim Wolf ( 32 saves / 33 shots )		Goalie stats	Viktor Östlund ( 37 saves / 39 shots )

10 April	HC La Chaux-de-Fonds	2-3	HC Ajoie	Patinoire des Mélèzes, La Chaux-de-Fonds	Recap
No scoring		First period	Derungs (Frossard) (PP1) - 4:32
21:49 - Rüegsegger (In-Albon, Östlund)		Second period	No scoring
11:52 - Topping (Huguenin, Matewa)		Third period	Asselin (Frossard, Wolf) - 16:36 Gauthier-Leduc (Macquat, Romanenghi) - 17:48
Viktor Östlund ( 30 saves / 33 shots )		Goalie stats	Tim Wolf ( 46 saves / 48 shots )

HC Ajoie won the series 4–2 and save his place in the National League
