= 2026 3ICE World Cup =

Ice hockey tournament in Northern Ireland

Tournament details
- Host country: Northern Ireland
- Venue: The O2 Belfast (in Belfast host cities)
- Dates: July 4–5
- Teams: 8

Final positions
- Champions: 3ICE Finland
- Runners-up: (United Kingdom) 3ICE Great Britain

Tournament statistics
- Games played: 8
- Goals scored: 48 (6 per game)
- Scoring leader: Chase Pearson (5 points)

Awards
- MVP: Teemu Pulkkinen

Official website
- 3ICE World Cup

The 2026 3ICE World Cup was held from July 4 to 5, 2026 at The O2 Belfast, Belfast.

== Teams participating ==
- (United Kingdom) 3ICE Great Britain (host)
- 3ICE Austria
- 3ICE Canada
- 3ICE Finland
- 3ICE Germany
- 3ICE Sweden
- 3ICE Switzerland
- (United States) 3ICE USA

== Rosters ==
=== Austria ===
Head coach: (Austria) Nino Pedevilla

No.	Pos.	Name	Height	Weight	Birthdate	Pro Team	3ICE Team
1	G	Rene Swette	1.83 m (6 ft 0 in)	85 kg (187 lb)	21 August 1988 (aged 37)	(Austria) EC VSV	no team
2	D	Michael Kernberger	1.84 m (6 ft 0 in)	87 kg (192 lb)	24 January 1997 (aged 29)	(Austria) HC TWK Innsbruck	no team
3	D	Niklas Wurschl	1.80 m (5 ft 11 in)	78 kg (172 lb)	28 August 1999 (aged 26)	(Austria) Steinbach Black Wings Linz	no team
4	F	Oskar Maier	1.78 m (5 ft 10 in)	78 kg (172 lb)	5 February 2002 (aged 24)	(Austria) Pioneers Vorarlberg	no team
5	F	Lukas Bar	1.78 m (5 ft 10 in)	84 kg (185 lb)	1 July 1997 (aged 29)	(Austria) HC TWK Innsbruck	no team
6	F	Nico Feldner	1.86 m (6 ft 1 in)	85 kg (187 lb)	11 October 1998 (aged 27)	(Austria) Graz 99ers	no team
7	F	Marcel Witting	1.76 m (5 ft 9 in)	83 kg (183 lb)	23 September 1995 (aged 30)	(Austria) HC TWK Innsbruck	no team

=== Canada ===
Head coach: (Canada) Larry Murphy

No.	Pos.	Name	Height	Weight	Birthdate	Pro Team	3ICE Team
1	G	Dylan Ferguson	1.88 m (6 ft 2 in)	88 kg (194 lb)	20 September 1998 (aged 27)	(Slovakia) HK Nitra	no team
2	D	Matthew Register	1.88 m (6 ft 2 in)	102 kg (225 lb)	2 September 1989 (aged 36)	(United States) Allen Americans	3ICE Boston
3	C	Jordan Kawaguchi	1.75 m (5 ft 9 in)	91 kg (201 lb)	4 May 1997 (aged 29)	(United Kingdom) Belfast Giants	no team
4	D	Josh Roach	1.85 m (6 ft 1 in)	86 kg (190 lb)	23 July 1992 (aged 33)	(United Kingdom) Belfast Giants	no team
5	C	Tag Bertuzzi	1.85 m (6 ft 1 in)	100 kg (220 lb)	18 February 2001 (aged 25)	(United States) Utica Comets	no team
6	F	Chase Pearson	1.91 m (6 ft 3 in)	92 kg (203 lb)	23 August 1997 (aged 28)	(United Kingdom) Nottingham Panthers	3ICE Chicago
7	F	Jayce Hawryluk	1.80 m (5 ft 11 in)	89 kg (196 lb)	1 January 1996 (aged 30)	(Switzerland) EHC Olten	no team

=== Finland ===
Head coach: (Finland) Raimo Helminen

No.	Pos.	Name	Height	Weight	Birthdate	Pro Team	3ICE Team
1	G	Kasimir Kaskisuo	1.91 m (6 ft 3 in)	88 kg (194 lb)	2 October 1993 (aged 32)	(Finland) JoKP	3ICE Pittsburgh
2	D	Teemu Kivihalme	1.83 m (6 ft 0 in)	84 kg (185 lb)	17 June 1995 (aged 31)	(Finland) SaiPa	no team
3	D	Oskari Laaksonen	1.85 m (6 ft 1 in)	83 kg (183 lb)	2 July 1999 (aged 27)	(Sweden) Lulea HF	no team
4	F	Teemu Pulkkinen	1.79 m (5 ft 10 in)	85 kg (187 lb)	2 January 1992 (aged 34)	(Germany) Starbulls Rosenheim	no team
5	F	Anton Levtchi	1.85 m (6 ft 1 in)	93 kg (205 lb)	28 November 1995 (aged 30)	(Sweden) Lulea HF	no team
6	F	Leo Ring	1.75 m (5 ft 9 in)	75 kg (165 lb)	4 October 2001 (aged 24)	(Finland) IPK	no team
7	F	Markus Nurmi	1.95 m (6 ft 5 in)	93 kg (205 lb)	29 June 1998 (aged 28)	(Sweden) Lulea HF	no team

=== Germany ===
Head coach: (Canada) Ron Pasco

No.	Pos.	Name	Height	Weight	Birthdate	Pro Team	3ICE Team
1	G	Niklas Lunemann	1.90 m (6 ft 3 in)	90 kg (200 lb)	27 April 2002 (aged 24)	(Germany) Dusseldorfer EG	no team
2	D	Colin Ugbekile	1.87 m (6 ft 2 in)	90 kg (200 lb)	24 September 1999 (aged 26)	(Germany) Iserlohn Roosters	no team
3	C	Jon Matsumoto	1.80 m (5 ft 11 in)	84 kg (185 lb)	13 October 1986 (aged 39)	(Germany) Krefeld Pinguine	no team
4	C	Cedric Schiemenz	1.81 m (5 ft 11 in)	74 kg (163 lb)	1 March 1999 (aged 27)	(Germany) Fischtown Pinguins	no team
5	F	Elias Lindner	1.88 m (6 ft 2 in)	84 kg (185 lb)	6 April 2001 (aged 25)	(Germany) EV Landshut	no team
6	F	Louis Brune	1.84 m (6 ft 0 in)	86 kg (190 lb)	5 May 2000 (aged 26)	(Germany) Eispiraten Crimmitschau	no team
7	F	Seb Streu	1.84 m (6 ft 0 in)	78 kg (172 lb)	22 November 1999 (aged 26)	(Germany) Eispiraten Crimmitschau	no team

=== Great Britain ===
Head coach: (Canada) Adam Keefe

No.	Pos.	Name	Height	Weight	Birthdate	Pro Team	3ICE Team
1	G	Lucas Brine	1.85 m (6 ft 1 in)	77 kg (170 lb)	9 August 2002 (aged 23)	(United Kingdom) Glasgow Clan	no team
2	C	Harrison Blaisdell	1.80 m (5 ft 11 in)	82 kg (181 lb)	18 March 2001 (aged 25)	(United States) Allen Americans	no team
3	C	Cameron Briere	1.77 m (5 ft 10 in)	74 kg (163 lb)	5 November 2005 (aged 20)	(United States) Omaha Mavericks	no team
4	F	Joshua Waller	1.78 m (5 ft 10 in)	79 kg (174 lb)	2 June 1999 (aged 27)	(United Kingdom) Guildford Flames	no team
5	C	Thomas Freel	1.83 m (6 ft 0 in)	86 kg (190 lb)	26 June 2001 (aged 25)	(United States) Maine Black Bears	no team
6	F	Ciaran Long	1.90 m (6 ft 3 in)	81 kg (179 lb)	9 February 1991 (aged 35)	(United Kingdom) Belfast Giants	no team
7	F	Bayley Harewood	1.83 m (6 ft 0 in)	77 kg (170 lb)	7 July 2003 (aged 22)	(United Kingdom) Cardiff Devils	no team

=== Sweden ===
Head coach: (Sweden) Johnny Oduya

No.	Pos.	Name	Height	Weight	Birthdate	Pro Team	3ICE Team
1	G	Linus Lundin	1.90 m (6 ft 3 in)	95 kg (209 lb)	6 August 1992 (aged 33)	(Poland) TH Unia Oswiecim	no team
2	D	Oliver Kylington	1.80 m (5 ft 11 in)	82 kg (181 lb)	18 March 2001 (aged 25)	(Sweden) Djurgardens IF	no team
3	D	Victor Bjorkung	1.83 m (6 ft 0 in)	85 kg (187 lb)	7 April 1993 (aged 33)	(Poland) KH Zaglebie Sosnowiec	no team
4	C	Carl Jacobson	1.79 m (5 ft 10 in)	82 kg (181 lb)	25 June 2004 (aged 22)	(Sweden) Ornskoldsvik Hockey	no team
5	F	Anton Karlsson	1.87 m (6 ft 2 in)	89 kg (196 lb)	3 August 1996 (aged 29)	(United Kingdom) Fife Flyers	no team
6	F	Daniel Olsson-Trkulja	1.82 m (6 ft 0 in)	85 kg (187 lb)	3 March 1991 (aged 35)	(Poland) TH Unia Oswiecim	no team
7	F	Dmytro Timashov	1.77 m (5 ft 10 in)	85 kg (187 lb)	1 October 1996 (aged 29)	(Russia) Admiral Vladivostok	no team

=== Switzerland ===
Head coach: (Canada) Christian Wohlwend

No.	Pos.	Name	Height	Weight	Birthdate	Pro Team	3ICE Team
1	G	Lucas Rotheli	1.80 m (5 ft 11 in)	84 kg (185 lb)	29 November 2002 (aged 23)	(Switzerland) EHC Olten	no team
2	F	Jorden Gahler	1.82 m (6 ft 0 in)	83 kg (183 lb)	11 March 1993 (aged 33)	(Switzerland) EHC Visp	no team
3	F	Kay Schweri	1.78 m (5 ft 10 in)	80 kg (180 lb)	28 December 1996 (aged 29)	(Switzerland) EHC Basel	no team
4	F	Joel Marchon	1.80 m (5 ft 11 in)	83 kg (183 lb)	7 February 2003 (aged 23)	(Switzerland) EHC Visp	no team
5	F	Livio Truog	1.77 m (5 ft 10 in)	82 kg (181 lb)	30 November 2003 (aged 22)	(Switzerland) HC Thurgau	no team
6	F	Mattheo Reinhard	1.75 m (5 ft 9 in)	79 kg (174 lb)	26 June 2004 (aged 22)	(Switzerland) EHC Olten	no team
7	F	Sandro Forrer	1.77 m (5 ft 10 in)	75 kg (165 lb)	6 November 1997 (aged 28)	(Switzerland) EHC Visp	no team

=== USA ===
Head coach: (Canada) Ken Daneyko

No.	Pos.	Name	Height	Weight	Birthdate	Pro Team	3ICE Team
1	G	Jeremy Brodeur	1.85 m (6 ft 1 in)	86 kg (190 lb)	29 October 1996 (aged 29)	(United States) Adirondack Thunder	3ICE Iowa
2	D	Will MacKinnon	1.80 m (5 ft 11 in)	91 kg (201 lb)	13 April 2000 (aged 26)	(United States) Toledo Walleye	3ICE NY/NJ
3	C	Patrick Grasso	1.75 m (5 ft 9 in)	75 kg (165 lb)	29 May 1996 (aged 30)	(United States) Adirondack Thunder	3ICE Pittsburgh
4	F	Hank Crone	1.78 m (5 ft 10 in)	77 kg (170 lb)	19 February 1998 (aged 28)	(United States) Allen Americans	3ICE Minnesota
5	F	Zachary Solow	1.75 m (5 ft 9 in)	84 kg (185 lb)	6 November 1998 (aged 27)	(Germany) Adler Mannheim	3ICE Buffalo
6	F	Eddie Matsushima	1.80 m (5 ft 11 in)	84 kg (185 lb)	4 January 1994 (aged 32)	(United States) Bloomington Bison	3ICE Buffalo
7	F	Peter Lenes	1.63 m (5 ft 4 in)	73 kg (161 lb)	3 April 1986 (aged 40)	no team	no team

== Tournament bracket ==
Quarterfinals
July 4
(United States) 3ICE USA	3
3ICE Canada	4
July 4
3ICE Sweden	3
3ICE Finland	6
July 4
3ICE Germany	3
3ICE Austria	2
July 4
(United Kingdom) 3ICE Great Britain (SO)	3
3ICE Switzerland	2

Semifinals
July 5
3ICE Canada	2
3ICE Finland (SO)	3
July 5
3ICE Germany	2
(United Kingdom) 3ICE Great Britain (SO)	3

Final
July 5
3ICE Finland	6
(United Kingdom) 3ICE Great Britain	1
Consolation
July 5
3ICE Canada	4
3ICE Germany (SO)	5

== Statistics ==
=== Scoring leaders ===
List shows the top eight skaters sorted by points.

Player	GP	G
(Canada) Chase Pearson	3	5
(Finland) Markus Nurmi	3	4
(Finland) Teemu Pulkkinen	3	4
(Germany) Seb Streu	3	4
(United Kingdom) Cameron Briere	3	3
(Finland) Leo Ring	3	3
(Canada) Tag Bertuzzi	3	2
(Canada) Josh Roach	3	2
(Germany) Cedric Schiemenz	3	2
