= Riat =

Riat or RIAT may refer to:

- Arnaud Riat (born 1999), Swiss professional ice hockey right winger
- Damien Riat (born 1997), Swiss professional ice hockey winger
- Royal International Air Tattoo (RIAT), the world's largest military air show
- Research Institute for Arts and Technology (RIAT), an Austrian scientific organization
