= Caffi =

Caffi is an Italian surname. Notable people with the surname include:

- Alex Caffi (born 1964), Italian Formula One driver
- Alex Caffi (ice hockey) (born 1990), Italian ice hockey goaltender
- Francesco Caffi (1778–1874), Italian councillor and musicologist
- Ippolito Caffi (1809–1866), Italian architectural painter
- Margherita Caffi (1648–1710), Italian still life painter
- María Teresa Infante Caffi (born 1950), Chilean judge
- Pedro Pablo García Caffi (1944–2022), Argentine singer and cultural administrator
- Urbain Caffi (1917–1991), Italian-born French racing cyclist

== See also ==
- Museo di Scienze Naturali Enrico Caffi, natural history museum in Bergamo
