= 3ICE =

Three-on-three professional ice hockey league

- Current season, competition or edition: 2025 3ICE Season
- Sport: Ice hockey
- Founded: January 13, 2020; 6 years ago
- Founder: E.J. Johnston
- First season: 2022
- CEO: E.J. Johnston
- Commissioner: Craig Patrick
- No. of teams: 8
- Most recent champion: 3ICE Philadelphia (2026)
- Broadcasters: TSN/RDS (Canada); DAZN (WorldWide)
- Website: www.3ice.com

3ICE is a professional three-on-three ice hockey league based in the United States. It debuted in 2022 and takes place during the National Hockey League (NHL) offseason. The league plays one-day tournaments of several 16-minute games in different cities through the season. Rosters consist of mostly minor league and some NHL players. Rule changes compared to the NHL keep the puck in play more continuously.

== History ==
The National Hockey League (NHL) introduced three-on-three overtime in 2015. Reality TV producer E.J. Johnston, the son of former NHL goaltender and coach Eddie Johnston, observed the new overtime format's popularity among fans, including at a Pittsburgh Penguins training camp and as an option in NHL video games, and began conceiving a three-on-three league as early as 2016. Johnston felt the three-on-three format highlighted players' "creativity" and thought the extra spacing allowed shorter "waterbug guys" to thrive.

3ICE was announced on January 13, 2020, along with television broadcast deals with CBS Sports in the United States and TSN and Quebec's RDS in Canada. The Hockey Hall of Fame coach Craig Patrick was named as the first commissioner. Johnston pitched the concept to hockey agents, players, TV executives, and other investors, raising almost US$10 million by the end of 2021.

Originally scheduled for the summer of 2021, 3ICE's inaugural season was delayed by a year due to the COVID-19 pandemic causing possible attendance restrictions. The league's first tournament took place at Orleans Arena in Las Vegas on June 18, 2022. Joe Mullen's team won the first 3ICE regular season, and Brian Trottier's team won the first Patrick Cup.

In June 2024, it was announced that the 2024 season would be cancelled. However, the league did return to play another season in the summer of 2025. Also in 2025, 3ICE announced a "3ICE World Cup" international tournament, with the inaugural tournament played in Belfast, Northern Ireland in July 2026.

== Format and rules ==
3ICE takes place from June to August during the NHL offseason. Every week, teams compete in a one-day tournament in a different city, with US$7,000 awarded to players on the winning team, ending with a four-team tournament for the Patrick Cup and US$1 million for the winning team. There are six skaters and one goaltender on each team. In the first season, most players were current or former minor league players, but about one third had played in the NHL.

Games consist of quick eight-minute halves, with the clock stopping only for penalties and injuries. Unlike in NHL overtime, where penalties create four-on-three power plays, penalties in 3ICE lead directly to penalty shots; these are "jailbreak" penalty shots, where other players can race behind the shooter after he touches the puck. Intentional icing is a penalty, but goalies can play the puck anywhere and have a larger crease than in the NHL. Face-offs are limited to the start of halves; goalies begin with the puck after stoppages. The puck remains in play after hitting the netting and, similar to basketball's half-court rule, may not be taken back across the center line on attack.

== Teams ==
Active teams in 3ICE.

| Team | Location | Arena | Founded | Coach |
|---|---|---|---|---|
| 3ICE Boston | Lowell, MA | Tsongas Center | 2023 | Ray Bourque |
| 3ICE Buffalo | Buffalo, NY | LECOM Harborcenter | 2024 | Pierre Turgeon |
| 3ICE Chicago | Geneva, IL | Fox Valley Ice Arena | 2022 | Grant Fuhr |
| 3ICE Dallas | Allen, TX | Credit Union of Texas Event Center | 2022 | Guy Carbonneau |
| 3ICE Minnesota | Minneapolis, MN | 3M Arena at Mariucci | 2022 | Larry Murphy |
| 3ICE NY/NJ | Newark, NJ | Prudential Center | 2024 | Ken Daneyko |
| 3ICE Pittsburgh | Pittsburgh, PA | PPG Paints Arena | 2022 | Joe Mullen |
| 3ICE Tennessee | Clarksville, TN | F&M Bank Arena | 2022 | John LeClair |

== 3ICE World Cup ==
| Year | Final host | Champion | Score | Runner-up | Third place | Score | Fourth place |
|---|---|---|---|---|---|---|---|
| 2026 | Belfast | Finland | 6–1 | Great Britain | Germany | 5–4 (SO) | Canada |
| 2027 | Belfast | | | | | | |

== See also ==
- Big3, 3x3 basketball league founded in 2017
