= Sean Collins (ice hockey, born 1988) =

Canadian ice hockey player (born 1988)

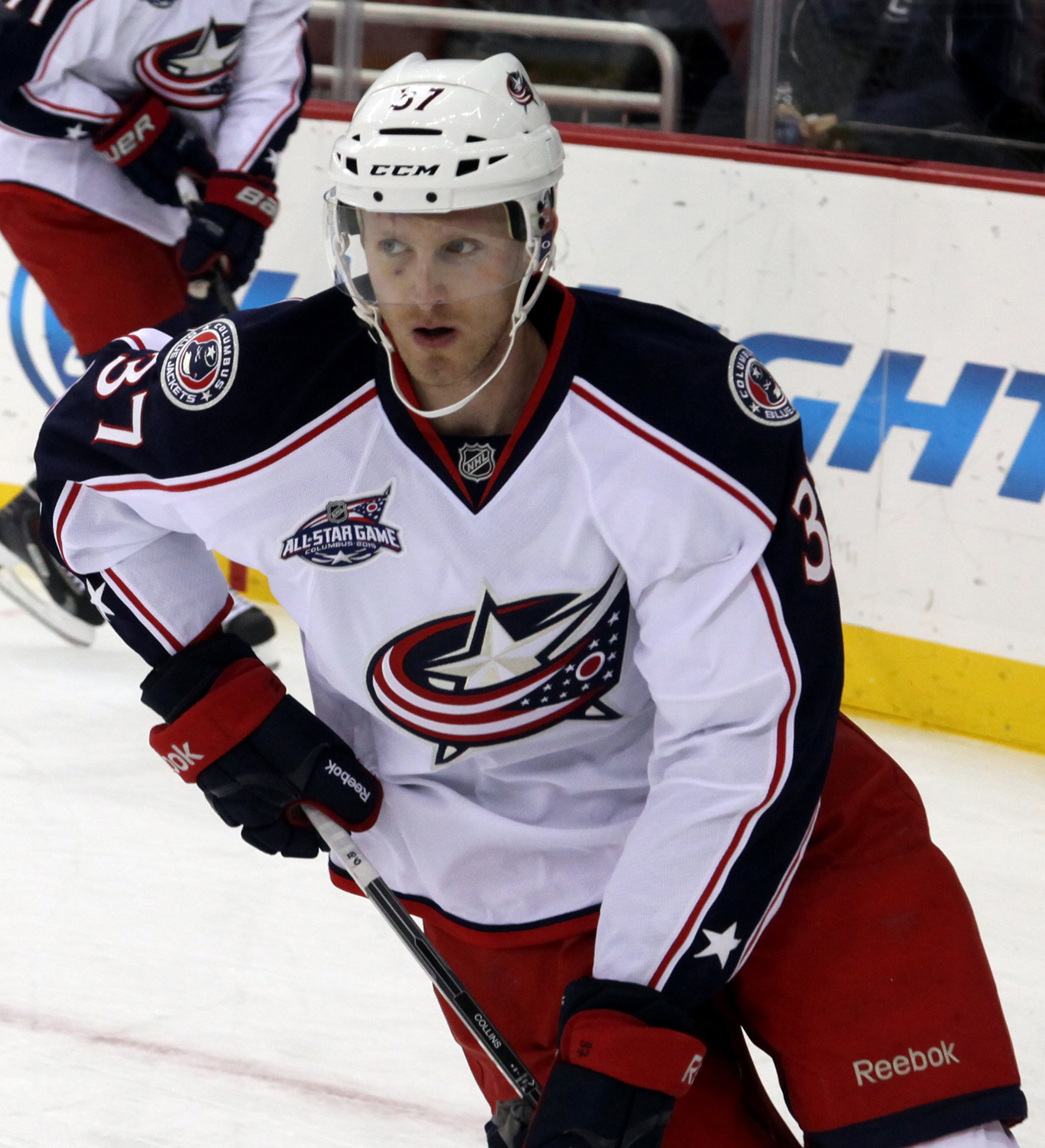
- Born: December 29, 1988 (age 37) Saskatoon, Saskatchewan, Canada
- Height: 6 ft 3 in (191 cm)
- Weight: 184 lb (83 kg; 13 st 2 lb)
- Position: Centre
- Shoots: Left
- EIHL team Former teams: Sheffield Steelers; Columbus Blue Jackets; Washington Capitals; Kunlun Red Star; HC Sochi; Adler Mannheim; HPK; EHC Olten; Black Wings Linz
- NHL draft: 187th overall, 2008; Columbus Blue Jackets
- Playing career: 2012–present

Sean Brendan Collins (born December 29, 1988) is a Canadian professional ice hockey forward. He is currently playing with Sheffield Steelers of the Elite Ice Hockey League (EIHL). He was drafted 187th overall by the Columbus Blue Jackets in the 2008 NHL entry draft.

== Playing career ==
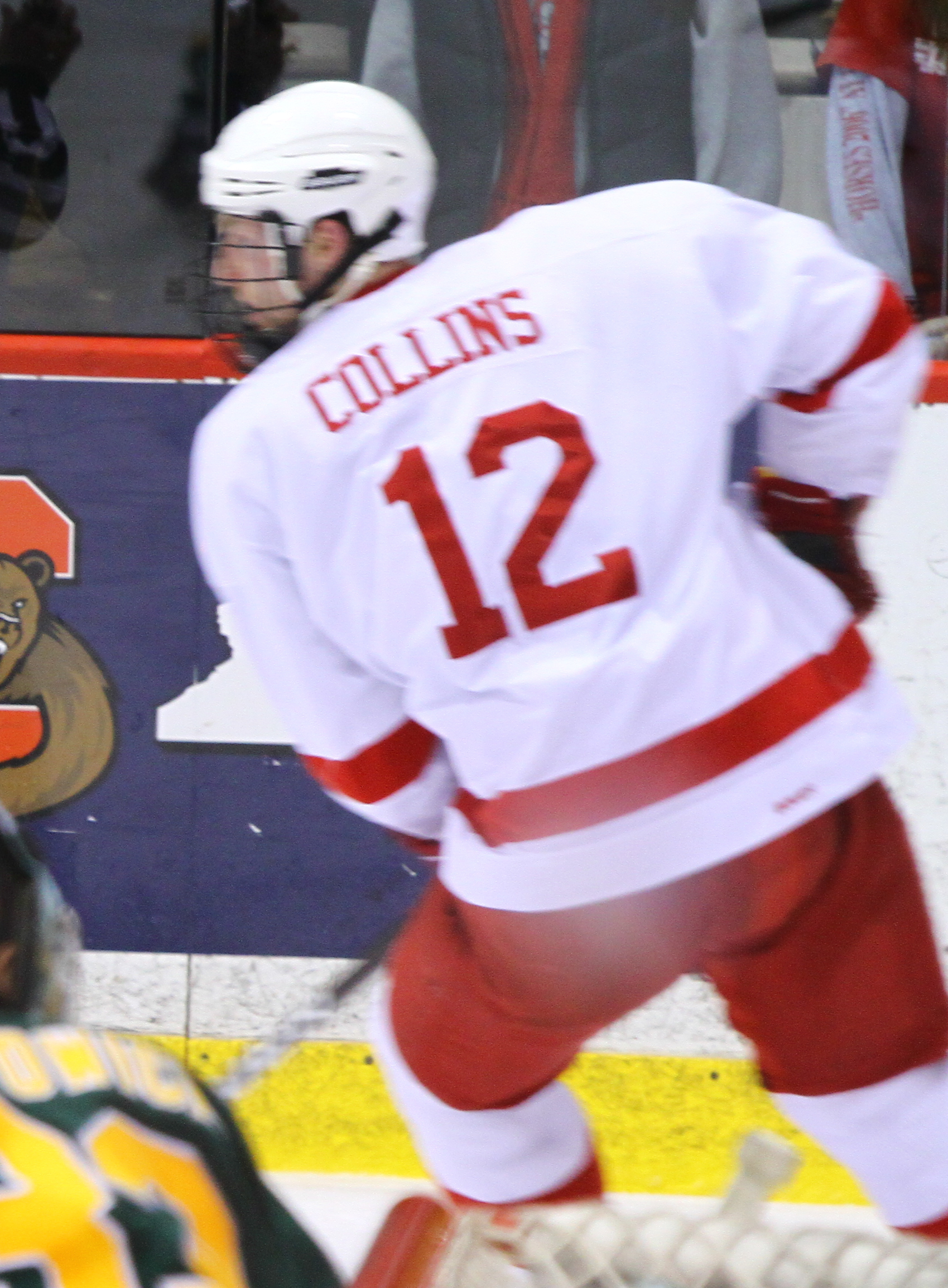
Collins playing with the Cornell Big Red in December 2011

Collins played minor junior hockey with the Waywayseecappo Wolverines in the Manitoba Junior Hockey League from 2006 to 2008 before he was picked by the Columbus Blue Jackets in the seventh round of the 2008 NHL entry draft. He was signed to an entry-level contract with the Blue Jackets organization following the end of his last season of ECAC Hockey with the Cornell Big Red. He was assigned to Columbus' American Hockey League affiliate, the Springfield Falcons, where he played eight games and registered five points.

At the start of the 2012–13 season, with the NHL lock-out in effect, he was directly assigned to the Falcons. Midway through the season with the Falcons, Collins was recalled by Columbus and made his NHL debut in a 3–2 defeat to the Anaheim Ducks on February 18, 2013.

On July 1, 2015, Collins left the Blue Jackets organization as a free agent and signed a one-year, two-way contract with the Washington Capitals.

On July 24, 2016, Collins opted to continue his career in the Kontinental Hockey League, signing a one-year deal with Chinese entrant, HC Kunlun Red Star. In the 2016–17 season, Collins enjoyed a successful introduction to the KHL with Kunlun, scoring the team's first regular season goal and contributing offensively with 39 points in 60 games to help reach the post-season in their inaugural season.

On May 5, 2017, Collins moved as a free agent to fellow KHL outfit, HC Sochi, on a one-year deal. After spending the past three seasons with Sochi, Collins opted to return to Kunlun, signing a one-year contract with the team on December 4, 2020.

On June 12, 2026, Collins signed with the Sheffield Steelers of the Elite Ice Hockey League (EIHL).

== Career statistics ==
			Regular season					Playoffs
Season	Team	League	GP	G	A	Pts	PIM	GP	G	A	Pts	PIM
2005–06	La Ronge Ice Wolves	SJHL	1	0	0	0	0	—	—	—	—	—
2006–07	Waywayseecappo Wolverines	MJHL	59	21	35	56	52	—	—	—	—	—
2007–08	Waywayseecappo Wolverines	MJHL	60	51	64	115	34	7	9	4	13	10
2008–09	Cornell University	ECAC	33	3	3	6	16	—	—	—	—	—
2009–10	Cornell University	ECAC	34	7	3	10	12	—	—	—	—	—
2010–11	Cornell University	ECAC	34	7	8	15	20	—	—	—	—	—
2011–12	Cornell University	ECAC	35	13	13	26	14	—	—	—	—	—
2011–12	Springfield Falcons	AHL	8	1	4	5	0	—	—	—	—	—
2012–13	Springfield Falcons	AHL	64	11	20	31	24	8	0	0	0	4
2012–13	Columbus Blue Jackets	NHL	5	0	0	0	6	—	—	—	—	—
2013–14	Springfield Falcons	AHL	67	16	25	41	34	5	0	1	1	2
2013–14	Columbus Blue Jackets	NHL	6	0	1	1	0	—	—	—	—	—
2014–15	Springfield Falcons	AHL	64	17	19	36	28	—	—	—	—	—
2014–15	Columbus Blue Jackets	NHL	8	0	2	2	2	—	—	—	—	—
2015–16	Washington Capitals	NHL	2	0	0	0	2	—	—	—	—	—
2015–16	Hershey Bears	AHL	75	16	23	39	37	16	3	1	4	4
2016–17	Kunlun Red Star	KHL	60	13	26	39	26	5	2	1	3	0
2017–18	HC Sochi	KHL	56	15	14	29	22	5	3	1	4	5
2018–19	HC Sochi	KHL	49	8	14	22	12	6	1	0	1	6
2019–20	HC Sochi	KHL	59	7	13	20	14	—	—	—	—	—
2020–21	Kunlun Red Star	KHL	29	2	5	7	2	—	—	—	—	—
2020–21	Adler Mannheim	DEL	16	1	6	7	2	5	0	1	1	0
2021–22	HPK	Liiga	53	5	10	15	20	—	—	—	—	—
2022–23	EHC Olten	SL	44	27	30	57	24	14	1	6	7	4
NHL totals			21	0	3	3	10	—	—	—	—	—
KHL totals			253	45	72	117	76	16	2	6	8	8
