= Adam Rundqvist =

Swedish ice hockey player (born 1990)

Adam Rundkvist
- Born: July 14, 1990 (age 35) Karlstad, Sweden
- Height: 5 ft 10 in (178 cm)
- Weight: 185 lb (84 kg; 13 st 3 lb)
- Position: Centre
- Shoots: Left
- Elitserien team Former teams: HC Ajoie; Leksands IF; Borås HC; IF Sundsvall Hockey; Vimmerby HC; Skövde IK; HC La Chaux-de-Fonds; Neuchâtel Hockey Academy; HC Thurgau
- Playing career: 2010–present

Adam Rundkvist (born July 14, 1990) is a Swedish professional ice hockey player. He played with Färjestads BK in the Elitserien during the 2010–11 Elitserien season.

== Career statistics ==
			Regular season					Playoffs
Season	Team	League	GP	G	A	Pts	PIM	GP	G	A	Pts	PIM
2009-10	Leksands IF	HockeyAllsvenskan	2	0	2	2	14	-	-	-	-	-
2010-11	Borås HC	HockeyAllsvenskan	52	6	4	10	32	-	-	-	-	-
2011-12	IF Sundsvall Hockey	HockeyAllsvenskan	49	7	11	18	58	10	1	2	3	8
2012-13	Vimmerby HC	Hockeyettan	41	9	25	34	38	3	3	0	3	0
2013-14	Vimmerby HC	HockeyEttan	41	12	19	31	46	-	-	-	-	-
2014-15	Skövde IK	HockeyEttan	36	13	17	30	22	-	-	-	-	-
2015-16	Skövde IK	HockeyEttan	34	7	23	30	22	2	1	1	2	4
2016-17	Skövde IK	HockeyEttan	36	6	20	26	12	2	0	2	2	4
2017-18	HC La Chaux-de-Fonds	SL	13	1	2	3	2	-	-	-	-	-
2017-18	Neuchâtel Hockey Academy	MSL	31	16	14	30	26	6	3	6	9	2
2018-19	HC Thurgau	SL	44	9	19	28	16	12	1	1	2	4
2018-19	HC Thurgau	Swiss Cup	1	0	0	0	0	-	-	-	-	-
2019-20	HC Thurgau	SL	38	10	7	17	8	5	0	0	0	0
2019-20	HC Thurgau	Swiss Cup	1	0	0	0	0	-	-	-	-	-
2020-21	HC Thurgau	SL	42	7	15	22	26	6	2	2	4	2
2020-21	HC Thurgau	Swiss Cup	1	0	0	0	2	-	-	-	-	-
2021-22	HC Thurgau	SL	49	3	20	23	20	9	1	5	6	6
2022-23	HC Thurgau	SL	45	4	17	21	22	11	0	9	9	0
2022-23	HC Ajoie	NL Qualification	-	-	-	-	-	6	0	3	3	2
2023-24	HC Ajoie	NL	42	1	2	3	14	-	-	-	-	-
HockeyAllsvenskan totals			103	13	17	30	104	10	1	2	3	8
SL totals			231	34	80	114	94	43	4	17	21	12
NL totals			42	1	2	3	14	-	-	-	-	-
