= Haralds Egle =

Latvian ice hockey player (born 1996)

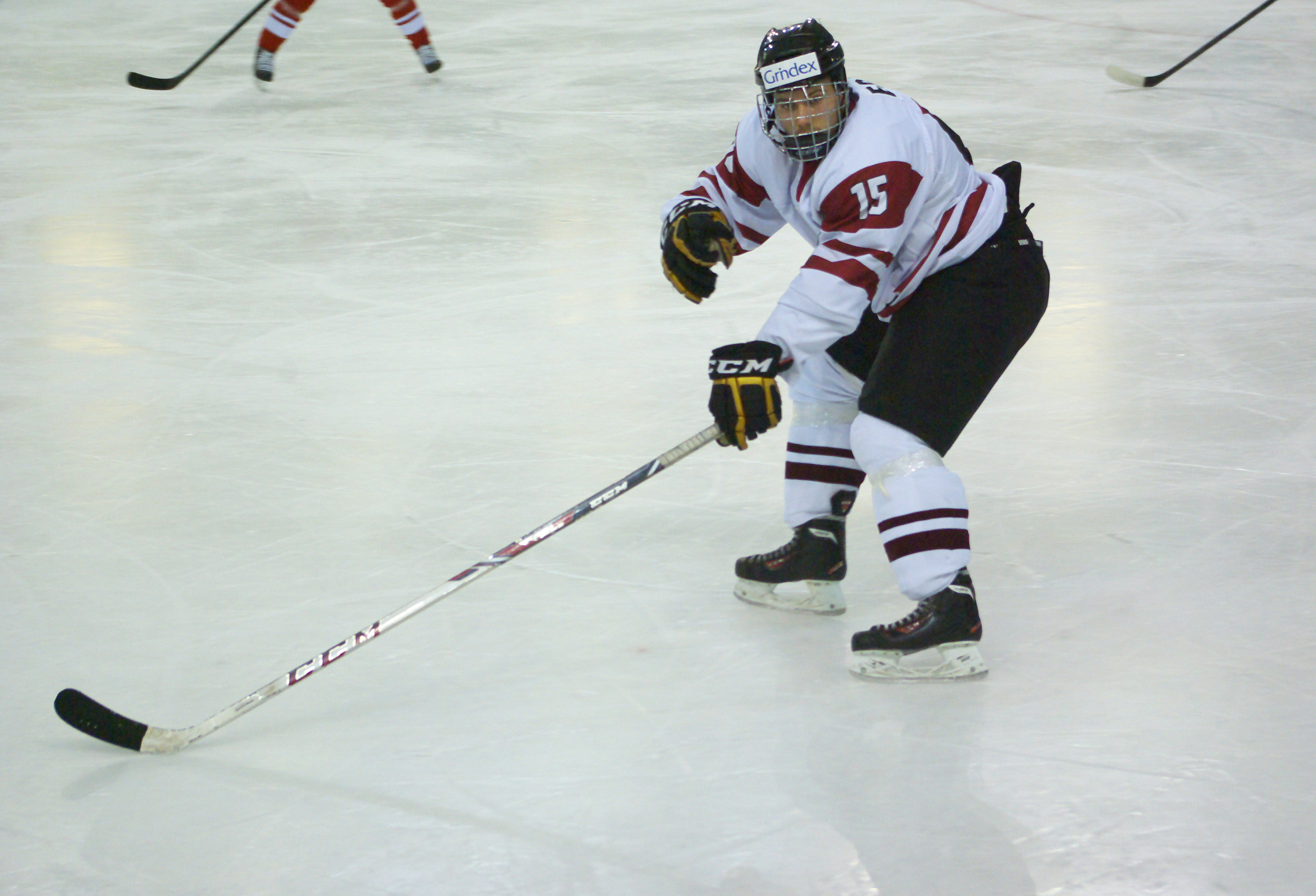
- Egle in December 2013
- Born: 11 May 1996 (age 30) Liepāja, Latvia
- Height: 180 cm (5 ft 11 in)
- Weight: 88 kg (194 lb; 13 st 12 lb)
- Position: Forward
- Shoots: Right
- Czech team Former teams: HC Energie Karlovy Vary; DVTK Jegesmedvék; Manitoba Moose; SCL Tigers; HK 32 Liptovský Mikuláš; HC Slovan Bratislava
- National team: Latvia
- NHL draft: Undrafted
- Playing career: 2020–present

Haralds Egle (born 11 May 1996) is a Latvian professional ice hockey player who is a forward for HC Energie Karlovy Vary of the Czech Extraliga (ELH).

== Playing career ==
Egle played college hockey for the Clarkson Golden Knights from 2016 to 2020. On 21 April 2020, Egle signed with Manitoba Moose of the American Hockey League (AHL).

== International play ==
Egle represented the Latvia national team at the 2026 Winter Olympics, and the 2024 and 2025 IIHF World Championship.

== Career statistics ==
=== Regular season and playoffs ===
			Regular season					Playoffs
Season	Team	League	GP	G	A	Pts	PIM	GP	G	A	Pts	PIM
2010–11	Metalurgs Liepāja U18	Latvia U18	8	5	11	16	4	—	—	—	—	—
2011–12	Green Mountain Glades	EmJHL	32	18	29	47	16	—	—	—	—	—
2011–12	Green Mountain Glades	EJHL	1	1	0	1	12	—	—	—	—	—
2012–13	Portland Jr. Pirates	EJHL	39	22	26	48	18	—	—	—	—	—
2013–14	Muskegon Lumberjacks	USHL	38	4	3	7	18	—	—	—	—	—
2014–15	Madison Capitols	USHL	54	18	25	43	92	—	—	—	—	—
2015–16	Madison Capitols	USHL	24	3	16	19	29	—	—	—	—	—
2015–16	Chicago Steel	USHL	28	4	15	19	8	—	—	—	—	—
2016–17	Clarkson University	NCAA	34	6	11	17	16	—	—	—	—	—
2017–18	Clarkson University	NCAA	30	5	11	16	2	—	—	—	—	—
2018–19	Clarkson University	NCAA	39	19	21	40	16	—	—	—	—	—
2019–20	Clarkson University	NCAA	32	14	18	32	22	—	—	—	—	—
2020–21	DVTK Jegesmedvék	Slovak	18	6	11	17	10	—	—	—	—	—
2020–21	Manitoba Moose	AHL	25	4	1	5	16	—	—	—	—	—
2021–22	Manitoba Moose	AHL	30	5	9	14	4	—	—	—	—	—
2022–23	SC Langenthal	SL	41	14	37	51	6	5	0	2	2	0
2022–23	SCL Tigers	NL	2	0	0	0	4	—	—	—	—	—
2023–24	HK 32 Liptovský Mikuláš	Slovak	49	11	28	39	18	5	1	3	4	6
2024–25	HC Slovan Bratislava	Slovak	17	5	5	10	8	—	—	—	—	—
2024–25	HK 32 Liptovský Mikuláš	Slovak	36	11	13	24	22	—	—	—	—	—
2025–26	HC Energie Karlovy Vary	ELH	45	9	15	24	16	3	1	2	3	0
Slovak totals			120	33	57	90	58	5	1	3	4	6
AHL totals			55	9	10	19	20	—	—	—	—	—
ELH totals			45	9	15	24	16	3	1	2	3	0

=== International ===
Year	Team	Event	GP	G	A	Pts	PIM
2013	Latvia U18	WJC-18	6	2	0	2	0
2014	Latvia U20	WJC-20 (D1)	5	1	0	1	12
2015	Latvia U20	WJC-20 (D1)	5	0	3	3	4
2016	Latvia U20	WJC-20 (D1)	5	1	2	3	2
2024	Latvia	WC	6	1	0	1	0
2024	Latvia	OGQ	3	1	1	2	0
2025	Latvia	WC	7	1	2	3	0
2026	Latvia	OG	2	0	0	0	0
2026	Latvia	WC	8	2	3	5	0
Junior totals			21	4	5	9	18
Senior totals			26	5	6	11	0
