= Timothy Kast =

Swiss ice hockey player

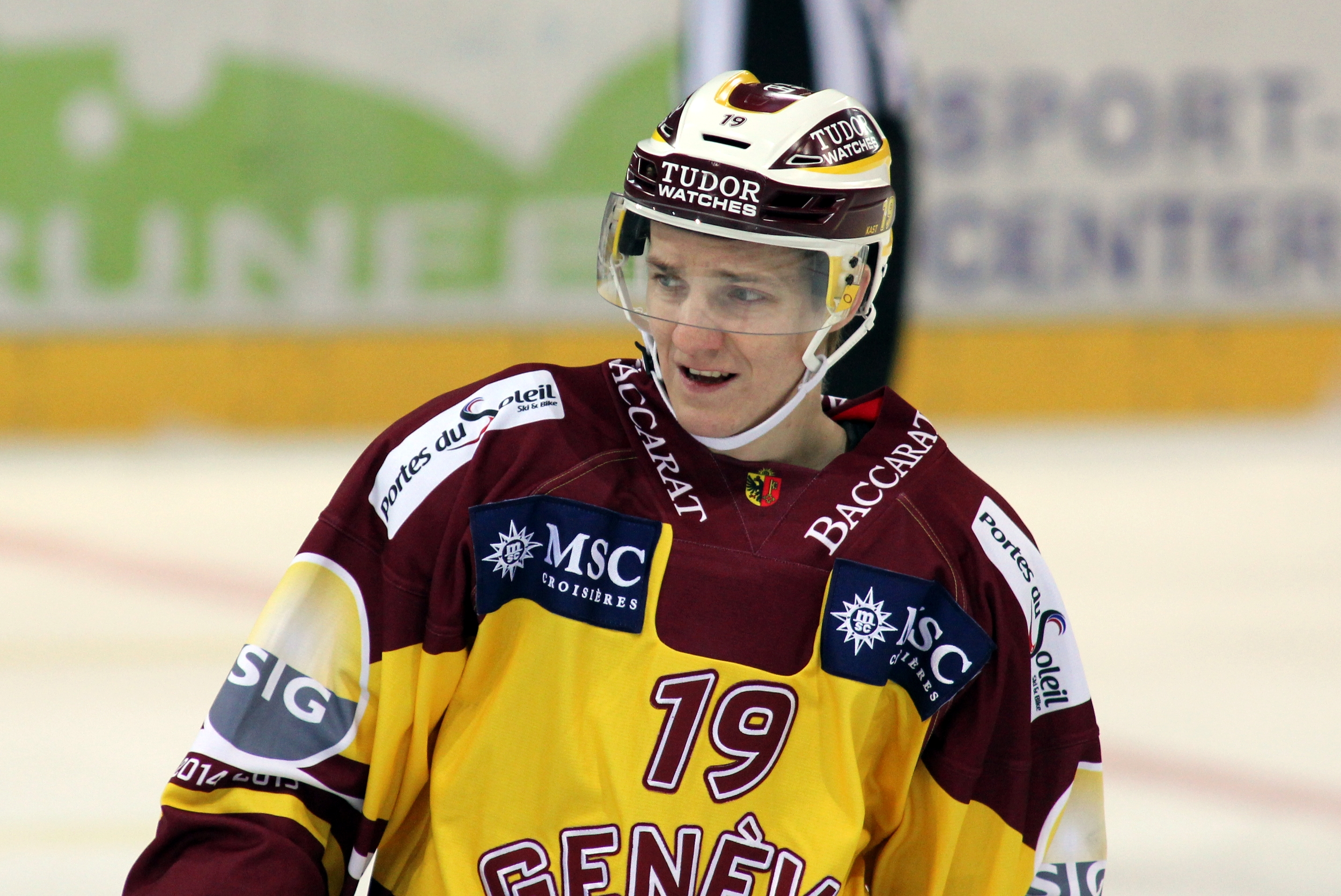
- Born: August 19, 1988 (age 36); Geneva, Switzerland
- Height: 5 ft 10 in (178 cm)
- Weight: 176 lb (80 kg; 12 st 8 lb)
- Position: Forward
- Shot: Left
- SL team Former teams: EHC Olten; HC Fribourg-Gottéron; EV Zug; Genève-Servette HC; SC Bern
- Playing career: 2007–2023

Timothy Kast (born August 19, 1988) is a Swiss professional ice hockey forward who is currently playing with EHC Olten of the Swiss League (SL). He previously played with EV Zug, Genève-Servette HC and SC Bern.

== Playing career ==
Kast made his National League A debut playing with Genève-Servette HC during the 2007–08 NLA season.

On November 21, 2016, Kast signed a two-year contract with EV Zug worth CHF 1 million for the 2017–18 and 2018–19 season.

On June 1, 2018, it was announced that Kast would re-join Genève-Servette for the 2018–19 season on a one-year deal, despite one year remaining on his contract with EV Zug. Kast appeared in 48 regular season games with Zug -tallying 13 points (3 goals)- as well as 5 playoffs games.

== Career statistics ==
			Regular season					Playoffs
Season	Team	League	GP	G	A	Pts	PIM	GP	G	A	Pts	PIM
2002–03	HC Genève-Servette U17	Top Novizen	—	—	—	—	—	—	—	—	—	—
2003–04	HC Genève-Servette U17	Top Novizen	—	—	—	—	—	—	—	—	—	—
2004–05	HC Genève-Servette U20	Elite Jr. A	20	3	2	5	6	—	—	—	—	—
2005–06	HC Genève-Servette U20	Elite Jr. A	33	4	13	17	18	—	—	—	—	—
2005–06	HC Monthey	SwissDiv1	6	0	0	0	6	—	—	—	—	—
2006–07	HC Genève-Servette U20	Elite Jr. A	36	9	22	31	68	2	1	0	1	2
2006–07	HC Monthey	SwissDiv1	1	0	0	0	0	—	—	—	—	—
2007–08	HC Genève-Servette U20	Elite Jr. A	36	11	30	41	75	—	—	—	—	—
2007–08	Genève-Servette HC	NLA	10	0	0	0	0	7	1	0	1	0
2007–08	Lausanne HC	NLB	2	0	0	0	0	—	—	—	—	—
2008–09	Genève-Servette HC	NLA	11	1	0	1	0	—	—	—	—	—
2008–09	EHC Basel	NLB	38	6	25	31	20	—	—	—	—	—
2009–10	EHC Basel Sharks	NLB	23	1	12	13	8	—	—	—	—	—
2009–10	HC La Chaux-de-Fonds	NLB	18	1	8	9	2	5	0	6	6	4
2010–11	HC La Chaux-de-Fonds	NLB	45	6	26	32	26	11	3	4	7	6
2011–12	HC La Chaux-de-Fonds	NLB	45	11	33	44	22	13	3	4	7	6
2012–13	HC La Chaux-de-Fonds	NLB	45	15	24	39	24	7	2	7	9	12
2012–13	HC Fribourg-Gottéron	NLA	1	0	0	0	0	1	0	0	0	0
2013–14	HC La Chaux-de-Fonds	NLB	45	15	31	46	10	11	3	7	10	12
2013–14	Genève-Servette HC	NLA	—	—	—	—	—	1	0	0	0	0
2014–15	Genève-Servette HC	NLA	50	6	14	20	14	12	0	1	1	0
2015–16	Genève-Servette HC	NLA	40	5	12	17	18	11	3	3	6	2
2016–17	Genève-Servette HC	NLA	49	7	11	18	18	—	—	—	—	—
2017–18	EV Zug	NL	48	3	10	13	12	5	0	0	0	0
2018–19	Genève-Servette HC	NL	46	5	10	15	20	5	0	1	1	0
2019–20	Genève-Servette HC	NL	42	1	4	5	8	—	—	—	—	—
2020–21	Genève-Servette HC	NL	32	1	5	6	2	11	0	2	2	0
2020–21	HC La Chaux-de-Fonds	SL	4	0	1	1	0	—	—	—	—	—
2021–22	SC Bern	NL	45	5	9	14	6	—	—	—	—	—
2022–23	EHC Olten	SL	41	9	19	28	14	14	5	13	18	8
NLA totals			374	34	75	109	98	53	4	7	11	2
NLB totals			306	64	179	243	126	61	16	41	57	58
