= Damien Riat =

Swiss ice hockey player (born 1997)

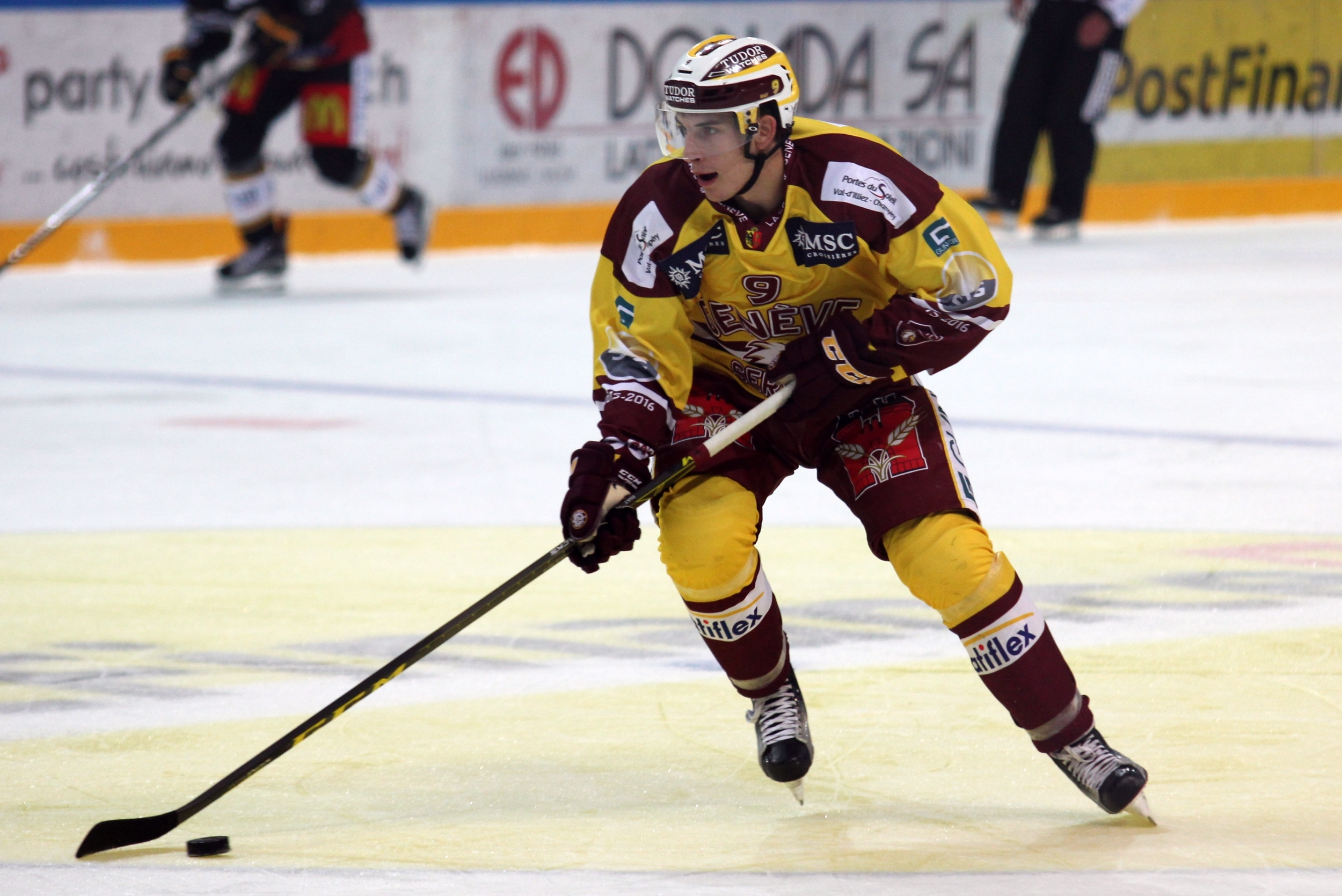
- Born: 26 February 1997 (age 29) Geneva, Switzerland
- Height: 6 ft 0 in (183 cm)
- Weight: 181 lb (82 kg; 12 st 13 lb)
- Position: Winger
- Shoots: Right
- NL team Former teams: Lausanne HC; Genève-Servette HC; EHC Biel
- National team: Switzerland
- NHL draft: 117th overall, 2016; Washington Capitals
- Playing career: 2015–present

Damien Riat (born 26 February 1997) is a Swiss professional ice hockey player who is a winger for Lausanne HC of the National League (NL). He is also currently serving as their captain. Riat was drafted 117th overall by the Washington Capitals in the 2016 NHL entry draft.

== Playing career ==
Riat spent the 2014–15 season with Malmö Redhawks junior teams. At the end of the season, he joined his hometown team, Genève-Servette HC on a three-year deal.

Riat made his professional debut with Genève-Servette HC in the 2015–16 season, appearing in 45 National League games this season and putting up 21 points (9 goals). He went on to play three more seasons with Geneva, playing 139 regular season games (59 points) and 13 playoffs games (4 points).

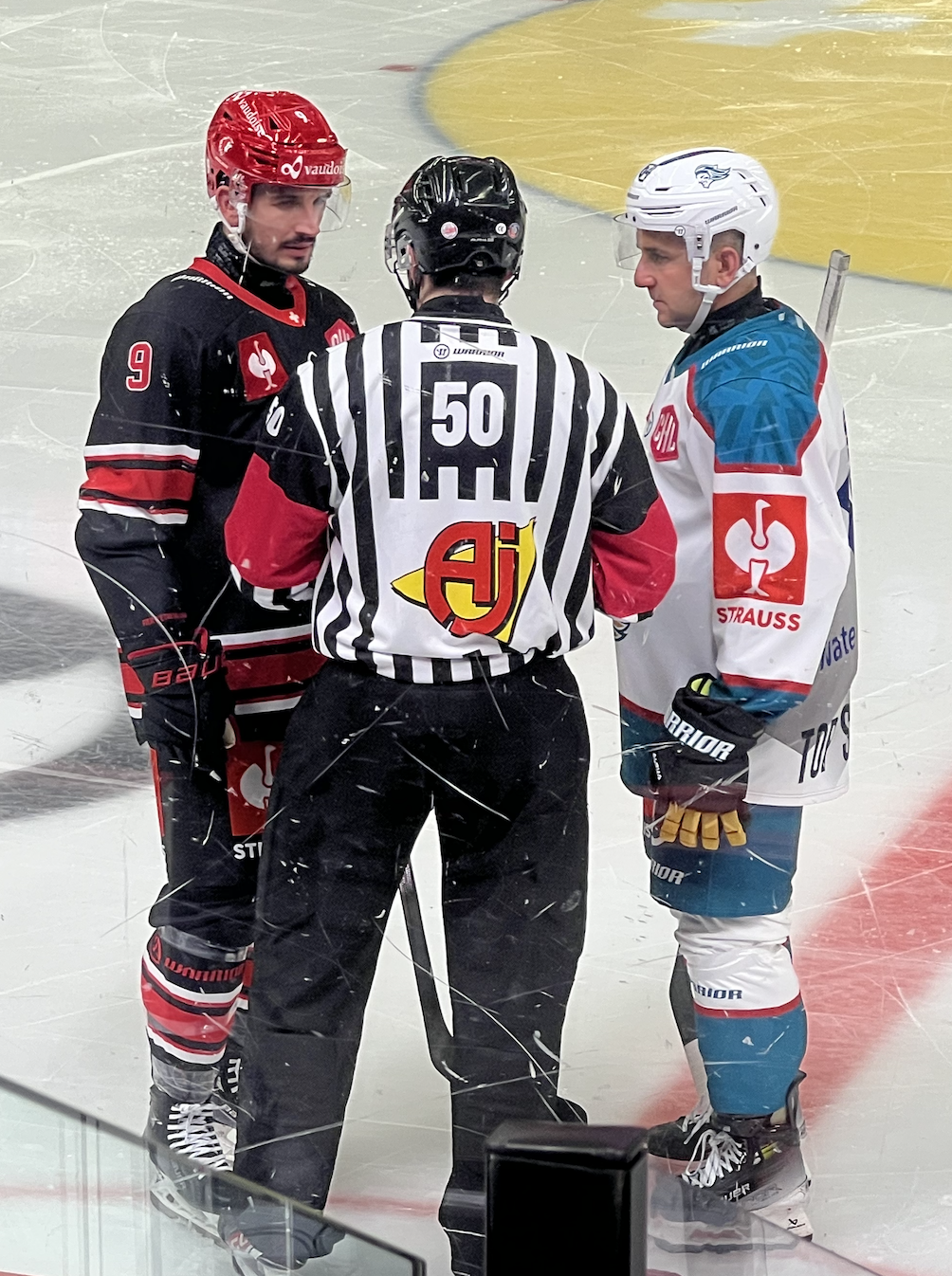
Riat (left) and Belfast Giants captain confer with the referee during a Champions Hockey League game in 2025.

On 3 February 2018, Riat agreed to a two-year contract with EHC Biel beginning from the 2018–19 season.

On 5 March 2020, Riat was signed to a two-year entry-level contract by the Washington Capitals of the National Hockey League (NHL). On 4 August 2020, the Washington Capitals agreed to return Riat on loan to former club Genève-Servette HC for the beginning of the 2020–21 season due to the COVID-19 pandemic delaying the North American season. On 11 January 2021, Riat was suspended for 7 games and fined CHF 6,000 for a hit from behind that sent HC Lugano's Elia Riva head first into the boards on 8 January 2021. Riva left the ice on his skates and was brought to the hospital on a stretcher. On 27 January 2021, with one game remaining on his suspension, Riat was reassigned to the Hershey Bears of the AHL for the start of the shortened season.

On 12 August 2021, Riat joined Lausanne HC for the 2021–22 season, on loan from the Washington Capitals. In 35 regular season games with Lausanne, Riat collected 11 goals and 28 points. Following a first-round defeat in the post-season, Riat was signed to a two-year contract extension to remain with Lausanne on 22 April 2022.

== International play ==
Medal record

Ice hockey

Representing Switzerland

World Championships
Silver medal – second place	2018 Denmark	
Silver medal – second place	2025 Sweden/Denmark	
Silver medal – second place	2026 Switzerland	

Riat was named to Switzerland's under-20 team for the 2016 IIHF World Junior Championships in Helsinki, Finland. He played 6 games with the team, putting up 2 goals and 2 assists. Riat also made the team for the 2017 IIHF World Junior Championships in Montreal, Quebec, Canada. He appeared in 5 games and scored 1 goal and 5 assists.

Riat made his IIHF World Championship debut in 2018 and won silver with Switzerland. He made the trip to Bratislava, Slovakia for the 2019 IIHF World Championship with team Switzerland and was a healthy scratch for the first two games before being sent back home to make room for Sven Andrighetto.

Riat was a part of the Swiss team for the 2025 IIHF World Championship and won Silver.

== Personal life ==
Riat is the older brother of HC Sierre's player, Arnaud Riat.

== Career statistics ==
=== Regular season and playoffs ===
			Regular season					Playoffs
Season	Team	League	GP	G	A	Pts	PIM	GP	G	A	Pts	PIM
2012–13	Notre Dame Argos	SMHL	36	4	9	13	58	3	0	0	0	2
2013–14	Notre Dame Argos	SMHL	44	18	38	56	56	12	5	7	12	28
2014–15	Malmö Redhawks	J20	40	7	7	14	70	—	—	—	—	—
2014–15	Malmö Redhawks	Allsv	3	0	0	0	0	—	—	—	—	—
2015–16	Genève-Servette HC	Elite Jr. A	4	3	5	8	10	—	—	—	—	—
2015–16	Genève-Servette HC	NLA	45	9	12	21	34	4	1	2	3	10
2016–17	Genève-Servette HC	NLA	46	7	7	14	36	4	0	0	0	4
2017–18	Genève-Servette HC	NL	48	12	12	24	30	5	0	1	1	2
2018–19	EHC Biel	NL	48	11	14	25	38	12	3	1	4	0
2019–20	EHC Biel	NL	36	11	11	22	57	—	—	—	—	—
2020–21	Genève-Servette HC	NL	20	7	11	18	29	—	—	—	—	—
2020–21	Hershey Bears	AHL	33	3	6	9	12	—	—	—	—	—
2021–22	Lausanne HC	NL	35	11	17	28	12	8	1	1	2	2
2022–23	Lausanne HC	NL	52	9	16	25	24	—	—	—	—	—
2023–24	Lausanne HC	NL	50	18	19	37	20	19	6	5	11	8
2024–25	Lausanne HC	NL	52	17	20	37	24	19	7	8	15	12
NL totals			432	112	139	251	304	71	18	18	36	38

=== International ===
Year	Team	Event	Result	GP	G	A	Pts	PIM
2013	Switzerland	IH18	6th	4	1	0	1	2
2014	Switzerland	U18	7th	5	1	1	2	0
2014	Switzerland	IH18	7th	4	1	2	3	25
2015	Switzerland	U18	4th	7	3	2	5	4
2016	Switzerland	WJC	9th	6	2	2	4	8
2017	Switzerland	WJC	7th	5	1	5	6	8
2018	Switzerland	WC	2nd place, silver medalist(s)	6	0	0	0	0
2022	Switzerland	WC	5th	5	1	0	1	2
2023	Switzerland	WC	5th	5	1	3	4	0
2025	Switzerland	WC	2nd place, silver medalist(s)	10	6	1	7	2
2026	Switzerland	OG	5th	5	2	1	3	4
2026	Switzerland	WC	2nd place, silver medalist(s)	10	5	3	8	10
Junior totals				31	9	12	21	47
Senior totals				41	15	8	23	18
