= Sondre Olden =

Norwegian ice hockey player

- Born: August 29, 1992 (age 33) Oslo, Norway
- Height: 6 ft 4 in (193 cm)
- Weight: 185 lb (84 kg; 13 st 3 lb)
- Position: Right wing
- Shoots: Left
- EIHL team Former teams: Sheffield Steelers; Modo Hockey; Vålerenga; Brynäs IF; Leksands IF; KHL Medveščak Zagreb; Vienna Capitals
- National team: Norway
- NHL draft: 79th overall, 2010; Toronto Maple Leafs
- Playing career: 2010–present

Sondre Olden (born August 29, 1992) is a Norwegian professional ice hockey player who is currently playing in the Swiss League. He previously played with Vålerenga of the Norwegian Eliteserien. He was selected by the Toronto Maple Leafs in the 3rd round (79th overall) of the 2010 NHL entry draft. He has played for the Norwegian national team in several World Championships, as well as at the 2014 Winter Olympics.

== Playing career ==
In July 2011, Olden signed with the major junior team Erie Otters of the Ontario Hockey League. After the 2011–12 season, Olden was called up to the Toronto Marlies, where he received a try-out with the club. After failing to earn a contract, Olden returned to Norway and signed with Vålerenga of the GET-ligaen. Olden played parts of three seasons with Vålerenga including his last season with the club on loan from Swedish club, Brynäs IF.

== Awards and honours ==
Medal record

Representing Norway

Ice hockey

World Junior Ice Hockey Championships
Bronze medal – third place	2009 Denmark	Division I Group B
Gold medal – first place	2010 Poland	Division I Group B
Bronze medal – third place	2012 Germany	Division I Group A

IIHF World U18 Championships
Gold medal – first place	2010 Denmark	Division I Group B

- Sondre was selected to the 2011 Team Norway World Junior U20 team roster for the Buffalo, NY IIHF tournament.
- Sondre was named for the best player in the World Junior U20 Championship Division 1A 2012 in Germany.

== Career statistics ==
=== Regular season and playoffs ===
			Regular season					Playoffs
Season	Team	League	GP	G	A	Pts	PIM	GP	G	A	Pts	PIM
2007–08	Manglerud Star	NOR U19	19	20	18	38	12	—	—	—	—	—
2008–09	Manglerud Star	NOR U17	1	2	3	5	0	—	—	—	—	—
2008–09	Manglerud Star	NOR U19	19	32	35	67	18	—	—	—	—	—
2008–09	Manglerud Star	NOR.2	24	9	17	26	4	5	2	2	4	2
2009–10	Modo Hockey	J18	8	11	15	26	10	—	—	—	—	—
2009–10	Modo Hockey	J18 Allsv	16	10	3	13	12	5	1	0	1	6
2009–10	Modo Hockey	J20	32	7	20	27	22	—	—	—	—	—
2010–11	Modo Hockey	J20	33	7	15	22	18	6	2	4	6	2
2010–11	Modo Hockey	SEL	3	0	0	0	0	—	—	—	—	—
2011–12	Erie Otters	OHL	48	11	21	32	20	—	—	—	—	—
2012–13	Vålerenga Ishockey	NOR U20	1	1	0	1	4	—	—	—	—	—
2012–13	Vålerenga Ishockey	NOR	40	10	15	25	14	15	3	4	7	20
2013–14	Vålerenga Ishockey	NOR	43	25	33	58	34	18	5	8	13	2
2014–15	Brynäs IF	SHL	20	1	1	2	2	—	—	—	—	—
2014–15	Vålerenga Ishockey	NOR	11	6	12	18	10	3	1	1	2	0
2015–16	Brynäs IF	SHL	37	4	5	9	4	3	1	1	2	0
2016–17	Leksands IF	SHL	46	4	3	7	6	—	—	—	—	—
2017–18	KHL Medveščak Zagreb	AUT	53	28	29	57	26	6	3	5	8	0
2018–19	KHL Medveščak Zagreb	AUT	16	5	9	14	2	—	—	—	—	—
2018–19	Vienna Capitals	AUT	21	11	13	24	12	18	7	7	14	6
2019–20	Vienna Capitals	AUT	47	16	25	41	20	3	0	1	1	0
2020–21	Vålerenga Ishockey	NOR	20	5	14	19	24	—	—	—	—	—
2020–21	Sheffield Steelers	EIHL Series	16	8	8	16	8	—	—	—	—	—
2021–22	HC La Chaux–de–Fonds	SUI.2	44	22	42	64	13	—	—	—	—	—
SEL/SHL totals			106	9	9	18	12	3	1	1	2	0
NOR totals			114	46	74	120	82	36	9	13	22	22
AUT totals			137	60	76	136	60	27	10	13	23	6

=== International ===
Year	Team	Event	GP	G	A	Pts	PIM
2009	Norway	WJC D1	5	0	0	0	0
2009	Norway	WJC18	6	2	1	3	2
2010	Norway	WJC D1	5	3	1	4	0
2010	Norway	WJC18 D1	5	7	15	22	4
2011	Norway	WJC	6	0	0	0	6
2012	Norway	WJC D1A	5	2	6	8	2
2014	Norway	OG	4	0	0	0	0
2014	Norway	WC	7	1	1	2	2
2017	Norway	WC	6	0	0	0	0
2019	Norway	WC	7	2	0	2	0
2021	Norway	WC	6	1	3	4	0
2021	Norway	OGQ	3	0	2	2	0
2023	Norway	WC	7	1	0	1	0
Junior totals			32	14	23	37	14
Senior totals			40	7	7	14	4
