= Larry Murphy (ice hockey) =

Canadian ice hockey player (born 1961)

- Hockey Hall of Fame, 2004
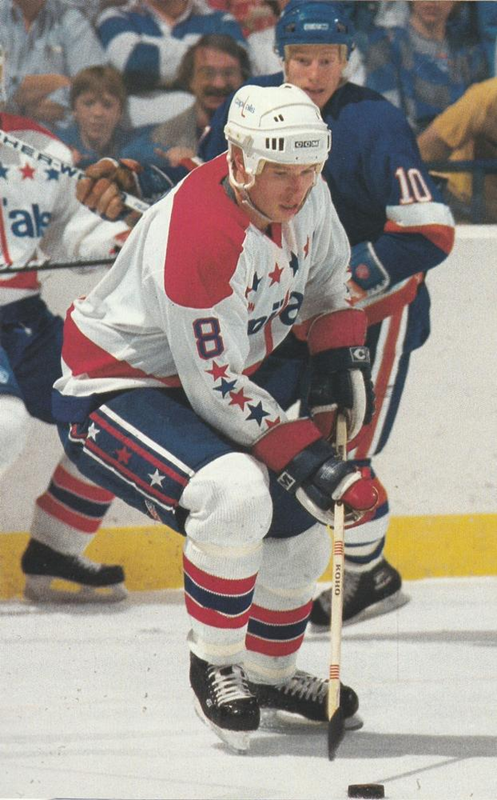
- Murphy with the Washington Capitals in 1987
- Born: March 8, 1961 (age 65) Scarborough, Ontario, Canada
- Height: 6 ft 2 in (188 cm)
- Weight: 210 lb (95 kg; 15 st 0 lb)
- Position: Defence
- Shot: Right
- Played for: Los Angeles Kings; Washington Capitals; Minnesota North Stars; Pittsburgh Penguins; Toronto Maple Leafs; Detroit Red Wings
- National team: Canada
- NHL draft: 4th overall, 1980; Los Angeles Kings
- Playing career: 1980–2001
Medal record
Representing Canada
Ice hockey
Canada Cup
| Gold medal – first place | 1987 Canada | Ice Hockey |
| Gold medal – first place | 1991 Canada | Ice Hockey |
World Championships
| Silver medal – second place | 1985 Canada |

Lawrence Thomas Murphy (born March 8, 1961) is a Canadian former professional ice hockey defenceman. He played over 20 years in the National Hockey League (NHL), suiting up for the Los Angeles Kings, Washington Capitals, Minnesota North Stars, Pittsburgh Penguins, Toronto Maple Leafs, and Detroit Red Wings. A durable player lauded for his perseverance and longevity with offensive capabilities, Murphy set the rookie record the most points scored by a defenceman with 76 for the Kings in 1981. He was traded in 1983 to the Capitals, where he had four 50-point seasons. He was traded late in the 1989 deadline to the North Stars, where he played until being traded to the Penguins in late 1990 to the Penguins, where he became a mainstay of durability. In the playoffs that year, he had 23 points with 18 assists as the Penguins won their first Cup in 1991; he had 16 assists in the next Cup win in 1992. He was traded to Toronto in the summer of 1995 and subsequently to Detroit in the spring of 1997, where he played a key role in consecutive Stanley Cup victories in 1997 and 1998.

Murphy retired in 2001 after playing 1,615 games, which was the most played by a defenceman at the time; his 1,216 points rank among the highest at the position. He was inducted into the Hockey Hall of Fame in his first year of eligibility.

He currently serves as a studio analyst and fill-in color commentator during away games for the Red Wings on Bally Sports Detroit and coaches the 3ICE team in Minnesota.

== Playing career ==
As a youth, Murphy played in the 1974 Quebec International Pee-Wee Hockey Tournament with the Toronto Shopsy's minor ice hockey team. Murphy played junior hockey with the Peterborough Petes, where he won a Memorial Cup in 1979. The Petes also reached the championship game the following year, but lost in overtime. He represented Canada at the 1980 World Junior Ice Hockey Championships prior to being drafted 4th overall in the 1980 NHL entry draft by the Los Angeles Kings. In the 1980–81 NHL season, he set National Hockey League records for most assists and points by a rookie defenceman, with 60 and 76 respectively; it is still the record for a rookie playing an entire season as a defenseman. Murphy finished second in the Calder Memorial Trophy voting for his rookie play to Peter Stastny. On October 18, 1983, the Kings traded him to the Washington Capitals for defenceman Brian Engblom and winger Ken Houston early in the 1983–84 season. Each team were equally struggling at the time of the trade, while Murphy bristled at the treatment he received in salary arbitration and Kings coach Don Perry and team GM George Maguire equally stating their unhappiness with Murphy's attitude and play that led to a trade with Washington, who had desired him for two years. The trade ultimately did not work out in the Kings' favor long-term because of Murphy's prolonged success in the league.

Murphy set a franchise record in game one of the first round matchup against the New York Islanders with the fastest two goals scored by a Capitals player in a playoff game, doing so sixteen seconds apart from each other in game one. Mike Gartner scored less than two minutes later to give the Capitals three goals in the span of 2:09 that also set the record for fastest three goals in franchise history and both records still stand. Murphy had his peak in goals in the 1986–87 campaign with 23 goals to go along with 58 assists; he finished third place in voting for the Norris Trophy. Later that year, Murphy was a key member of Canada's championship team in the Canada Cup. His six assists tied teammate Ray Bourque for tops in the tournament among defencemen, which included Mario Lemieux's overtime goal in game two (which Murphy later called the best game he ever played in) of the Final against the Soviet Union. He then scored a goal and two assists in the decisive third game, and was also used as a decoy by Wayne Gretzky on Lemieux's tournament winner. On March 7, 1989, Murphy, alongside Mike Gartner, was traded by the Capitals to the Minnesota North Stars for Dino Ciccarelli and Bob Rouse, with Capitals GM David Poile calling it a move to change the team's lack of success at playoff time, particularly with the struggling power play. In Murphy's one full season with the North Stars in 1989-90, he had 58 assists with 10 goals while finishing with a plus-minus of -13.

On December 11, 1990, with the Pittsburgh Penguins wading in the middle of the pack due to a back injury to star player Mario Lemieux, the team traded for Murphy and Peter Taglianetti that sent Jim Johnson and Chris Dahlquist to the North Stars. Murphy proved to be a durable force for the Penguins over the next four years, dressing up for 410 out of 421 combined games. He contributed 23 assists with five goals in the last 44 games of the 1990-91 season that saw the Penguins reach the Stanley Cup playoffs. In the playoffs, Murphy had five goals and 18 assists while leading all players with a plus-minus of 17; he scored his lone goal in the Stanley Cup Final against Minnesota in the decisive game six as the final one of a 8–0 rout that saw the Penguins win their first ever Stanley Cup. Later that year, he was on the roster for the Canada Cup team, which did not lose any of its eight games en route to the title. The 1991–92 campaign had him contribute 56 assists with 21 goals for his first 20-goal season in five years. Murphy had 16 points in 21 games for the playoffs. In the Stanley Cup Final, Murphy scored just one goal, doing so in game four in the third period that gave Pittsburgh a 5–4 lead in the eventual 6–4 victory that saw Pittsburgh win the Cup once more. Murphy peaked in Norris Trophy voting in the 1992–93 season with a third-place finish (losing to Chris Chelios), having recorded 22 goals with 63 assists while having a plus-minus of 45. In the Stanley Cup playoffs, the Penguins were shocked in the second round, while Murphy had eleven assists and two goals for the postseason run. In the strike-shortened 1994-95 season, his final one with Pittsburgh, he played in all 48 games and had 13 goals and 25 assists. In 2025, Murphy was among the ten individuals selected to be inducted into the relaunched team Hall of Fame in the near-future.

In 1995, after being named an NHL second-team All-Star, on July 8, Murphy was traded to his hometown Toronto Maple Leafs from the Penguins for Dmitri Mironov and a second-round pick. Leafs fans booed Murphy, the highest paid player on the Leafs, mercilessly as a scapegoat for the lack of success the team was having, although Murphy never stated a desire to be traded away. On March 18, 1997, with 39 points in 69 games, Murphy was traded to Detroit, with the team only having to pick up the "prorated portion" of Murphy's salary from the 1996-97 season and a portion of the 1997-98 salary. Red Wings coach Scotty Bowman, who had coached Murphy in Pittsburgh, felt that his experience and strong offensive capabilities would pair well with their line of defensemen for a team that had been ousted in the Final just two years prior. He was partnered with Nicklas Lidström, and they were an integral part of their two consecutive Stanley Cups in 1997 and 1998. In the 1998 Stanley Cup playoffs, he had two short-handed goals, which tied the record for most in that position in one postseason. Senior vice president Jimmy Devellano later referred to the acquisition of Murphy as the “move of moves."

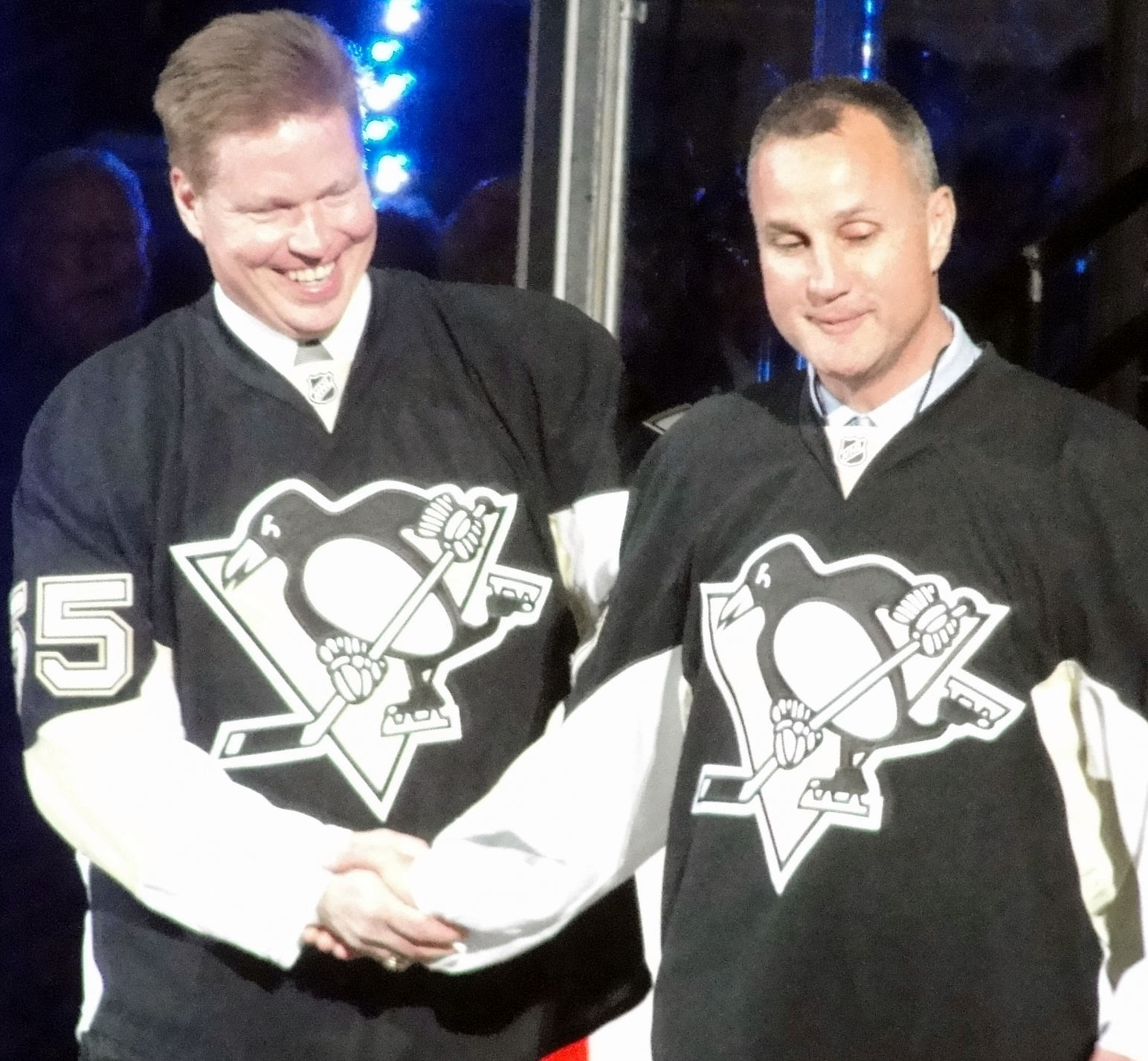
Murphy (left) and Paul Coffey are introduced during a pregame ceremony honouring the final regular season game at Mellon Arena, April 8, 2010.

Murphy retired at the close of the 2000–01 NHL season. In 21 seasons, he played for six teams. His 1,615 regular season games played stood as a record for the most career games by a defenceman, a mark previously held by Tim Horton; Murphy was surpassed by Scott Stevens of the New Jersey Devils three years later.

One of Murphy's most notable successes was the "Murphy Dump". During his stint with the Pittsburgh Penguins, Murphy would often dump the puck down the ice by lifting it high over the opposing team so that it eventually stopped before the opposing goal line. This would not only clear the zone safely, but would not result in an icing call. The "Murphy Dump" was officially coined by Penguins broadcaster Mike Lange. He was inducted into the Hockey Hall of Fame in 2004. Finishing his career with 1,216 points, Murphy is currently the fifth highest scoring defenceman in NHL history, behind Ray Bourque, Paul Coffey, Al MacInnis and Phil Housley. When asked about his play in 1996, he stated:

I’m not a fast skater, I don’t have a fast shot. That kind of takes a lot away right there. Knowing that, I knew what I had to do to be successful and to last. That’s the most important thing, stay in the league and play the game that will keep you there.

== Broadcasting and coaching ==
He was an alternate color commentator for the Detroit Red Wings during West Coast road trips on Fox Sports Detroit, filling-in for Mickey Redmond. From 2003 to 2006, he shared this duty with former teammate Pat Verbeek. However, following the 2005–06 NHL season, Verbeek left the job as broadcaster to become a scout for the Red Wings, and Murphy took over full-time on west coast road trips. Also in 2006, Murphy started contributing as a studio analyst on pregame, postgame, and intermissions in which he does not broadcast. In the 2007–08 season, Murphy began serving as a "Between-the-Benches" reporter for Fox Sports Detroit when Mickey Redmond was broadcasting home games and filled in for him when he had surgery to remove a tumor on his lung. He also made occasional appearances on the NHL Network's nightly hockey highlight show, NHL on the Fly. In March 2013, Fox Sports Detroit announced that he was fired after being told they weren't satisfied with ratings. On February 14, 2019, it was announced Murphy returned to the team on Fox Sports Detroit in the same capacity for the rest of the 2018–19 season, joining Chris Osgood.

In 2022, he was approached by Craig Patrick about coaching in 3ICE, the newly created three-on-three ice hockey league about being a head coach. He became head coach of 3ICE Minnesota, which plays in the NHL offseason.

On August 20, 2026, Murphy was select alongside Jim Rutherford, Jack McGregor, & Marc-Andre Fleury for induction into the Pittsburgh Penguins Hall of Fame Class of 2026 on November 14th before the Penguins play against the Ottawa Senators.

== Awards and achievements ==
- Member of four Stanley Cup winning teams: 1991 and 1992 (Pittsburgh), 1997, 1998 (Detroit)
- Selected to three NHL All-Star Games: 1994, 1996, 1999
- Selected to three NHL second All-Star teams: 1987, 1993, 1995
- Inducted to the Hockey Hall of Fame in his first year of eligibility (2004)
- 3ICE Eddie Johnston Coach of the Year Award: 2023

== NHL records ==
- Most points in a single season by a rookie defenceman: 76 in 1980–81 season
- Most assists in a single season by a rookie defenceman: 60 in 1980–81 season
- Most assists by a defenceman in a Stanley Cup Final: 9 (1991)

== Career statistics ==
=== Regular season and playoffs ===
| | | | Regular season | | | | | Playoffs |
| Season | Team | League | GP | G | A | Pts | PIM | GP | G | A | Pts | PIM |
|---|---|---|---|---|---|---|---|---|---|---|---|---|
| 1977–78 | Seneca Nationals | MetJHL | 36 | 10 | 20 | 30 | 25 | — | — | — | — | — |
| 1978–79 | Peterborough Petes | OMJHL | 66 | 6 | 21 | 27 | 82 | 19 | 1 | 9 | 10 | 42 |
| 1978–79 | Peterborough Petes | MC | — | — | — | — | — | 5 | 0 | 2 | 2 | 8 |
| 1979–80 | Peterborough Petes | OMJHL | 68 | 21 | 68 | 89 | 88 | 14 | 4 | 13 | 17 | 20 |
| 1979–80 | Peterborough Petes | MC | — | — | — | — | — | 5 | 1 | 6 | 7 | 4 |
| 1980–81 | Los Angeles Kings | NHL | 80 | 16 | 60 | 76 | 79 | 4 | 3 | 0 | 3 | 2 |
| 1981–82 | Los Angeles Kings | NHL | 79 | 22 | 44 | 66 | 95 | 10 | 2 | 8 | 10 | 12 |
| 1982–83 | Los Angeles Kings | NHL | 77 | 14 | 48 | 62 | 81 | — | — | — | — | — |
| 1983–84 | Los Angeles Kings | NHL | 6 | 0 | 3 | 3 | 0 | — | — | — | — | — |
| 1983–84 | Washington Capitals | NHL | 72 | 13 | 33 | 46 | 50 | 8 | 0 | 3 | 3 | 6 |
| 1984–85 | Washington Capitals | NHL | 79 | 14 | 42 | 56 | 51 | 5 | 2 | 3 | 5 | 0 |
| 1985–86 | Washington Capitals | NHL | 78 | 21 | 44 | 65 | 50 | 9 | 1 | 5 | 6 | 6 |
| 1986–87 | Washington Capitals | NHL | 80 | 23 | 58 | 81 | 39 | 7 | 2 | 2 | 4 | 6 |
| 1987–88 | Washington Capitals | NHL | 79 | 8 | 53 | 61 | 72 | 13 | 4 | 4 | 8 | 33 |
| 1988–89 | Washington Capitals | NHL | 65 | 7 | 29 | 36 | 70 | — | — | — | — | — |
| 1988–89 | Minnesota North Stars | NHL | 13 | 4 | 6 | 10 | 12 | 5 | 0 | 2 | 2 | 8 |
| 1989–90 | Minnesota North Stars | NHL | 77 | 10 | 58 | 68 | 44 | 7 | 1 | 2 | 3 | 31 |
| 1990–91 | Minnesota North Stars | NHL | 31 | 4 | 11 | 15 | 38 | — | — | — | — | — |
| 1990–91 | Pittsburgh Penguins | NHL | 44 | 5 | 23 | 28 | 30 | 23 | 5 | 18 | 23 | 44 |
| 1991–92 | Pittsburgh Penguins | NHL | 77 | 21 | 56 | 77 | 48 | 21 | 6 | 10 | 16 | 19 |
| 1992–93 | Pittsburgh Penguins | NHL | 83 | 22 | 63 | 85 | 73 | 12 | 2 | 11 | 13 | 10 |
| 1993–94 | Pittsburgh Penguins | NHL | 84 | 17 | 56 | 73 | 44 | 6 | 0 | 5 | 5 | 0 |
| 1994–95 | Pittsburgh Penguins | NHL | 48 | 13 | 25 | 38 | 18 | 12 | 2 | 13 | 15 | 0 |
| 1995–96 | Toronto Maple Leafs | NHL | 82 | 12 | 49 | 61 | 34 | 6 | 0 | 2 | 2 | 4 |
| 1996–97 | Toronto Maple Leafs | NHL | 69 | 7 | 32 | 39 | 20 | — | — | — | — | — |
| 1996–97 | Detroit Red Wings | NHL | 12 | 2 | 4 | 6 | 0 | 20 | 2 | 9 | 11 | 8 |
| 1997–98 | Detroit Red Wings | NHL | 82 | 11 | 41 | 52 | 37 | 22 | 3 | 12 | 15 | 2 |
| 1998–99 | Detroit Red Wings | NHL | 80 | 10 | 42 | 52 | 42 | 10 | 0 | 2 | 2 | 8 |
| 1999–2000 | Detroit Red Wings | NHL | 81 | 10 | 30 | 40 | 45 | 9 | 2 | 3 | 5 | 2 |
| 2000–01 | Detroit Red Wings | NHL | 57 | 2 | 19 | 21 | 12 | 6 | 0 | 1 | 1 | 0 |
| NHL totals | | | 1,615 | 288 | 929 | 1,217 | 1,084 | 215 | 37 | 115 | 152 | 201 |

=== International ===
| Year | Team | Event | Results | GP | G | A | Pts | PIM |
|---|---|---|---|---|---|---|---|---|
| 1980 | Canada | WJC | 5th | 5 | 1 | 0 | 1 | 4 |
| 1985 | Canada | WC | 2nd place, silver medalist(s) | 8 | 2 | 6 | 8 | 4 |
| 1987 | Canada | WC | 4th | 6 | 0 | 3 | 3 | 4 |
| 1987 | Canada | CC | 1st place, gold medalist(s) | 8 | 1 | 6 | 7 | 4 |
| 1991 | Canada | CC | 1st place, gold medalist(s) | 8 | 0 | 1 | 1 | 0 |
| 2000 | Canada | WC | 4th | 3 | 0 | 0 | 0 | 0 |
| Junior totals | | | | 5 | 1 | 0 | 1 | 4 |
| Senior totals | | | | 33 | 3 | 16 | 19 | 12 |

== See also ==
- List of NHL statistical leaders
- List of NHL players with 1,000 points
- List of NHL players with 1,000 games played

| Preceded by Jay Wells | Los Angeles Kings first-round draft pick 1980 | Succeeded by Jim Fox |
