= Arnaud Riat =

Swiss ice hockey player

- Born: April 18, 1999 (age 25); Geneva, Switzerland
- Height: 6 ft 1 in (185 cm)
- Weight: 175 lb (79 kg; 12 st 7 lb)
- Position: Right Wing
- Shoots: Right
- SL team Former teams: HC Sierre; Genève-Servette HC
- Playing career: 2018–present

Arnaud Riat (born 18 April 1999) is a Swiss professional ice hockey right winger who is currently playing with HC Sierre of the Swiss League (SL).

== Playing career ==
Riat made his professional debut with Genève-Servette HC in the 2017–18 season, appearing in 2 National League games this season. He spent the majority of the season with Geneva's junior team in the Elite Junior A, where he played 29 games and put up 31 points (10 goals) and added 6 points (2 goals) in 9 games in the playoffs to win the 2018 championship. Riat eventually played one more year with Geneva's junior team in the 2018–19 season and helped the team win the Elite Junior A championship once again. He scored his first NL goal with Genève-Servette that same year and appeared in 20 NL games scoring 3 points (1 goal).

Riat began the 2019/20 season, his last junior season, on Geneva's NL team roster but was immediately loaned to HC Sierre of the Swiss League. He went on to play 12 games (4 points) with Sierre before being called up by Geneva. Riat finished the season in the NL, appearing in 29 games (2 goals) before breaking his thumb at the end of January, forcing him to sit out the remainder of the regular season.

On March 2, 2020, Riat agreed to a two-year contract extension with Genève-Servette HC to remain with the team through the 2021/22 season. On February 23, 2021, Riat was reassigned to HC Ajoie of the SL.

== Personal life ==
Riat is the younger brother of Washington Capitals winger, Damien Riat.
