= Alex Caffi (ice hockey) =

Italian ice hockey goaltender

- Born: August 12, 1990 (age 35) Varese, Italy
- Height: 6 ft 1 in (185 cm)
- Weight: 172 lb (78 kg; 12 st 4 lb)
- Position: Goaltender
- Catches: Left
- EIHL team Former teams: Belfast Giants; HC Lugano; Pioneers Vorarlberg
- National team: Italy
- NHL draft: Undrafted
- Playing career: 2012–present

Alex Caffi (born August 12, 1990) is an Italian ice hockey goaltender. He is currently playing for Belfast Giants in the Elite Ice Hockey League.

== International ==
Caffi was named to the Italy national ice hockey team for competition at the 2014 IIHF World Championship.
