= Kay Schweri =

Swiss ice hockey player

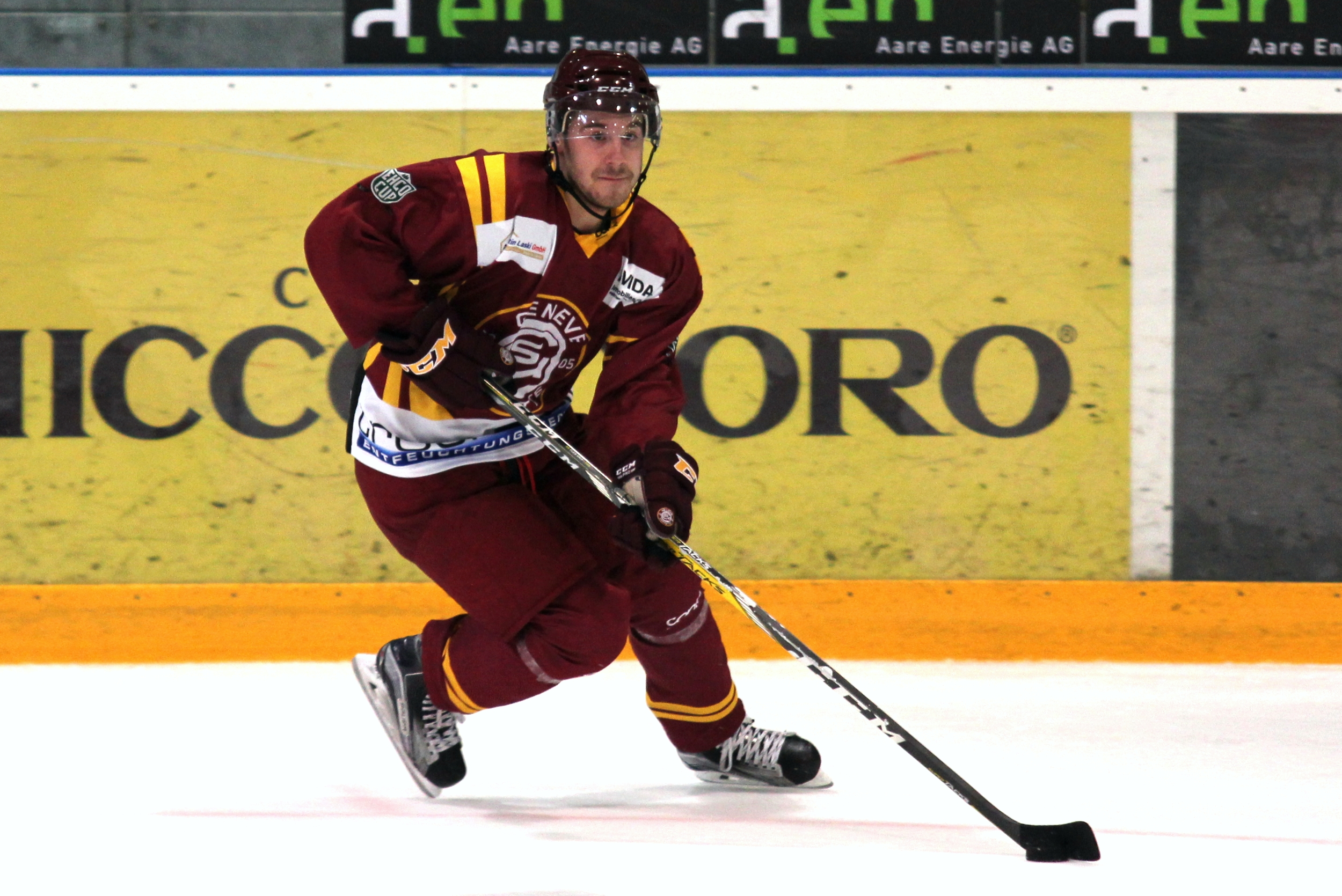
- Born: December 28, 1996 (age 28); Zürich, Switzerland
- Height: 5 ft 10 in (178 cm)
- Weight: 176 lb (80 kg; 12 st 8 lb)
- Position: Right Wing
- Shoots: Left
- SL team Former teams: HC La Chaux-de-Fonds; EHC Kloten; Genève-Servette HC; SC Rapperswil-Jona Lakers; SCL Tigers; HC Ajoie
- Playing career: 2014–present

Kay Schweri is a Swiss professional ice hockey right winger who is currently playing with HC La Chaux-de-Fonds of the Swiss League (SL). He previously played with EHC Kloten, Genève-Servette HC, the SC Rapperswil-Jona Lakers, the SCL Tigers and HC Ajoie.

== Playing career ==
=== Junior ===
Schweri played junior hockey with EHC Kloten U20 team for two seasons and made his professional debut with the National League (NL) team during the 2013-14 season, appearing in one game. At the conclusion of the season, he joined the Sherbrooke Phoenix of the Quebec Major Junior Hockey League (QMJHL) who had drafted him 35th overall in the 2014 CHL Import Draft. Schweri went on to play two seasons with the team, tallying 104 points (21 goals) in 87 regular season games and added 6 points (1 goal) in 9 postseason contests.

=== Genève-Servette HC ===
On May 23, 2016, Schweri signed his first professional contract, agreeing to a two-year deal with Genève-Servette HC of the NL. In his first season in Geneva, he was sent down to HC Ajoie of the Swiss League (SL) where he racked up 13 points in 8 games. This resulted in Schweri asking out of Geneva as he wasn't pleased with his utilization by head coach Chris McSorley. He eventually played 44 games (13 points) with Servette before being reassigned to HC Ajoie for the playoffs.

Schweri returned to Servette for the 2017-18 season under new head coach Craig Woodcroft. On January 12, 2018, he injured his arm which required surgery, forcing him to sit out the remainder of the season. Schweri ended his final season in Geneva having played 33 regular season games and picking up 9 points.

=== SC Rapperswil-Jona Lakers ===
On July 12, 2018, Schweri signed a one-year contract with the SC Rapperswil-Jona Lakers to remain in the NL.

On March 8, 2019, Schweri agreed to a two-year contract extension with the Lakers.

=== SCL Tigers ===
On July 7, 2021, Schweri signed as a free agent a one-year deal with the SCL Tigers.

=== HC Ajoie ===
On January 28, 2022, Schweri was traded to HC Ajoie for Dario Rohrbach.

=== HC La Chaux-de-Fonds ===
On April 26, 2022, Schweri joined HC La Chaux-de-Fonds of the Swiss League (SL) on a one-year deal.

== International play ==
Schweri represented Switzerland at the 2015 World Junior Championships in Toronto, Canada.
