= Victor Stăncescu =

Romanian-born Swiss ice hockey player

- Born: March 10, 1985 (age 40); Bucharest, Romania
- Height: 5 ft 11 in (180 cm)
- Weight: 201 lb (91 kg; 14 st 5 lb)
- Position: Forward
- Shoots: Right
- NLA team: Kloten Flyers
- National team: Switzerland
- NHL draft: Undrafted
- Playing career: 2002–present

Victor Stăncescu (born March 10, 1985) is a Romanian born Swiss professional ice hockey forward who is currently playing with and Captaining the Kloten Flyers in Switzerland's National League A (NLA).

He participated at the 2011 IIHF World Championship as a member of the Switzerland men's national ice hockey team.

== Career statistics ==
=== Regular season and playoffs ===
			Regular season					Playoffs
Season	Team	League	GP	G	A	Pts	PIM	GP	G	A	Pts	PIM
2001–02	Kloten Flyers	NLA	1	0	0	0	0	—	—	—	—	—
2002–03	Kloten Flyers	NLA	13	1	1	2	2	3	0	0	0	0
2003–04	Kloten Flyers	NLA	17	0	1	1	2	—	—	—	—	—
2003–04	GCK Lions	NLB	2	0	1	1	0	—	—	—	—	—
2004–05	Kloten Flyers	NLA	41	2	1	3	18	—	—	—	—	—
2005–06	Kloten Flyers	NLA	43	4	9	13	59	11	1	0	1	6
2006–07	Kloten Flyers	NLA	12	0	4	4	18	6	1	0	1	4
2007–08	Kloten Flyers	NLA	49	10	12	22	83	5	2	0	2	2
2008–09	Kloten Flyers	NLA	46	7	12	19	34	11	4	2	6	6
2009–10	Kloten Flyers	NLA	48	19	7	26	42	10	4	1	5	18
2010–11	Kloten Flyers	NLA	41	10	13	23	58	17	6	2	8	28
2011–12	Kloten Flyers	NLA	48	20	16	36	89	5	3	2	5	12
2012–13	Kloten Flyers	NLA	43	13	17	30	126	—	—	—	—	—
2013–14	Kloten Flyers	NLA	47	12	10	22	71	16	4	2	6	14
2014–15	Kloten Flyers	NLA	39	2	6	8	34	—	—	—	—	—
NLA totals			488	100	109	209	636	84	25	9	34	90

=== International ===
Year	Team	Event	Result	GP	G	A	Pts	PIM
2002	Switzerland	WJC18	7th	8	0	3	3	2
2003	Switzerland	WJC18	9th	6	0	0	0	2
2003	Switzerland	WJC	7th	6	0	1	1	2
2004	Switzerland	WJC	8th	6	2	1	3	2
2005	Switzerland	WJC	8th	6	5	2	7	10
2011	Switzerland	WC	9th	5	0	1	1	2
2014	Switzerland	WC	10th	7	0	0	0	4
Junior totals				32	7	7	14	28
Senior totals				12	0	1	1	6
