= David Jobin =

Swiss ice hockey player

- Born: September 27, 1981 (age 43); Bern, Switzerland
- Height: 5 ft 9 in (175 cm)
- Weight: 179 lb (81 kg; 12 st 11 lb)
- Position: Defence
- Shot: Right
- NLA team: SC Bern
- Playing career: 1998–2017

David Jobin (born September 27, 1981) is a Swiss professional ice hockey player who played for the SC Bern in Switzerland's National League A (NLA).

== Career statistics ==
			Regular season					Playoffs
Season	Team	League	GP	G	A	Pts	PIM	GP	G	A	Pts	PIM
1998–99	SC Bern	NLA	26	0	1	1	4	6	2	1	3	0
1998–99	EHC Biel-Bienne	NLB	12	1	1	2	4	—	—	—	—	—
1999–00	SC Bern	NLA	44	1	9	10	14	5	0	0	0	0
2000–01	SC Bern	NLA	37	2	6	8	4	10	0	3	3	4
2001–02	SC Bern	NLA	43	1	5	6	4	1	0	0	0	0
2002–03	SC Bern	NLA	37	0	3	3	10	1	0	0	0	0
2003–04	SC Bern	NLA	41	7	13	20	8	14	1	5	6	4
2004–05	SC Bern	NLA	37	3	3	6	2	8	0	0	0	0
2005–06	SC Bern	NLA	35	0	2	2	8	6	0	1	1	0
2006–07	SC Bern	NLA	37	4	11	15	6	17	2	7	9	2
2007–08	SC Bern	NLA	50	3	17	20	26	6	1	3	4	2
2008–09	SC Bern	NLA	39	2	17	19	36	6	1	3	4	2
2009–10	SC Bern	NLA	45	3	10	13	14	11	1	5	6	6
2010–11	SC Bern	NLA	44	1	7	8	26	11	0	3	3	6
2011–12	SC Bern	NLA	42	1	14	15	12	16	2	3	5	2
2012–13	SC Bern	NLA	46	2	15	17	12	9	0	2	2	0
2013–14	SC Bern	NLA	35	1	6	7	18	3	0	1	1	0
2014–15	SC Bern	NLA	42	2	11	13	10	9	0	0	0	0
2015–16	SC Bern	NLA	36	4	7	11	12	12	0	2	2	0
NLA totals			716	37	157	194	226	162	11	41	52	30

== Awards and honours ==
Award	Year
IIHF World U18 Championships All-Star Team	1999
