= Patrik Bärtschi =

Swiss ice hockey player (born 1984)

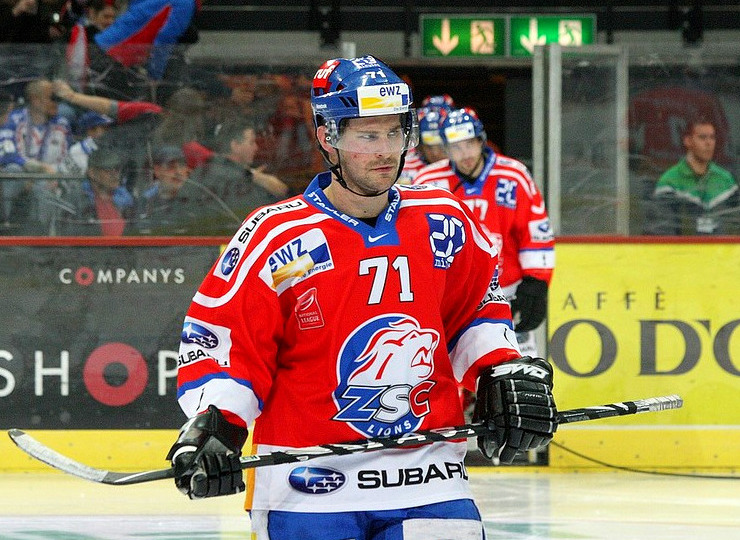
- Patrik Bärtschi in 2009 with ZSC Lions
- Born: 20 August 1984 (age 41) Bülach, Switzerland
- Height: 5 ft 10 in (178 cm)
- Weight: 194 lb (88 kg; 13 st 12 lb)
- Position: Right wing
- Shot: Right
- NLA team Former teams: ZSC Lions; Kloten Flyers; SC Bern
- National team: Switzerland
- NHL draft: 202nd overall, 2002; Pittsburgh Penguins
- Playing career: 2001–2017

Patrik Bärtschi (born 20 August 1984) is a retired Swiss professional ice hockey Winger who last played for ZSC Lions of the National League A (NLA).

== Playing career ==
Bärtschi was drafted by the Pittsburgh Penguins in the seventh round of the 2002 NHL entry draft, going 202nd overall. Bärtschi attended several training camps with the Penguins, but instead chose to continue his career in Switzerland.

From 2001 until 2006, Bärtschi was a member of the Kloten Flyers. He skated with SC Bern from 2006 until 2009. Bärtschi became a member of the ZSC Lions in March 2009. He led the Lions in points (53) during the 2009–10 NLA season.

== Career statistics ==
=== Regular season and playoffs ===
			Regular season					Playoffs
Season	Team	League	GP	G	A	Pts	PIM	GP	G	A	Pts	PIM
1999–2000	Kloten Flyers	SUI U20	26	12	14	26	14	—	—	—	—	—
2000–01	Kloten Flyers	SUI U20	36	38	30	68	14	6	11	3	14	6
2000–01	Kloten Flyers	NLA	2	0	0	0	0	—	—	—	—	—
2000–01	HC Thurgau	SUI.2	1	1	0	1	0	—	—	—	—	—
2001–02	Kloten Flyers	SUI U20	9	10	7	17	4	2	3	2	5	2
2001–02	Kloten Flyers	NLA	25	4	4	8	8	11	2	2	4	2
2001–02	EHC Wetzikon	SUI.3	5	2	4	6		—	—	—	—	—
2002–03	Kloten Flyers	NLA	44	21	16	37	39	5	1	3	4	4
2003–04	Kloten Flyers	NLA	40	12	23	35	6	—	—	—	—	—
2004–05	Kloten Flyers	NLA	28	7	8	15	12	—	—	—	—	—
2005–06	Kloten Flyers	NLA	44	10	18	28	26	11	1	2	3	14
2006–07	SC Bern	NLA	44	22	17	39	41	13	3	3	6	6
2007–08	SC Bern	NLA	50	18	17	35	22	6	2	1	3	4
2008–09	SC Bern	NLA	33	12	11	23	4	5	0	1	1	0
2009–10	ZSC Lions	NLA	49	25	28	53	34	7	3	3	6	12
2010–11	ZSC Lions	NLA	29	8	9	17	0	—	—	—	—	—
2011–12	ZSC Lions	NLA	48	11	7	18	8	15	9	2	11	4
2012–13	ZSC Lions	NLA	50	12	11	23	6	12	3	1	4	0
2013–14	ZSC Lions	NLA	44	21	7	28	22	18	3	5	8	0
2014–15	ZSC Lions	NLA	45	13	12	25	16	18	4	5	9	6
2015–16	ZSC Lions	NLA	34	4	9	13	4	3	0	0	0	0
2016–17	ZSC Lions	NLA	25	2	4	6	4	—	—	—	—	—
NLA totals			634	202	201	403	252	124	31	28	59	52

=== International ===
Year	Team	Event	Result	GP	G	A	Pts	PIM
2001	Switzerland	WJC18	2nd place, silver medalist(s)	7	5	2	7	4
2002	Switzerland	WJC	4th	7	2	2	4	2
2002	Switzerland	WJC18	7th	8	5	4	9	4
2003	Switzerland	WJC	7th	6	6	4	10	0
2003	Switzerland	WC	8th	6	1	0	1	0
2004	Switzerland	WJC	8th	6	3	5	8	0
2005	Switzerland	WC	8th	2	0	0	0	0
2008	Switzerland	WC	7th	7	1	2	3	0
Junior totals				34	21	17	38	10
Senior totals				15	2	2	4	0
