= Morris Trachsler =

Swiss ice hockey player

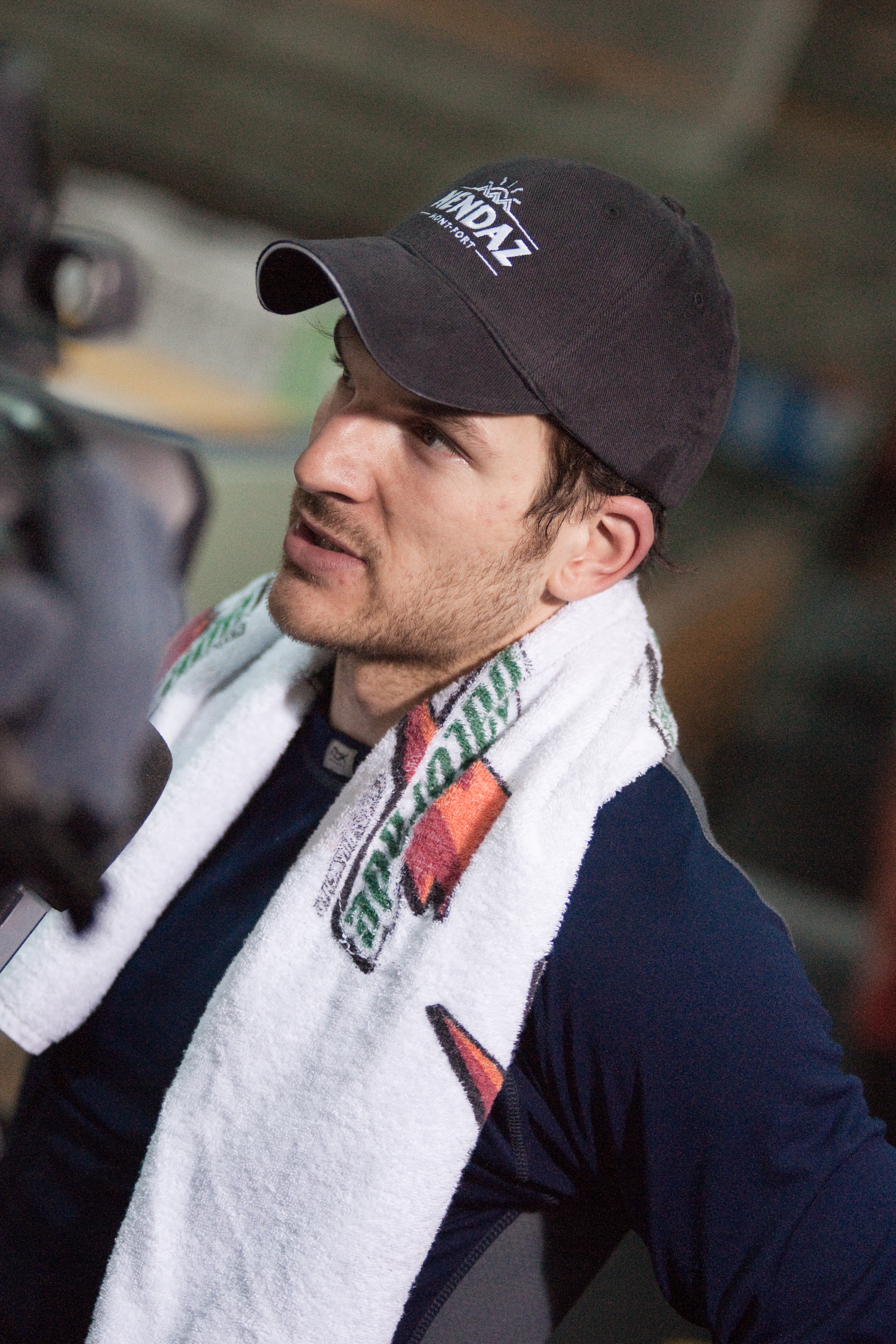
- Born: July 15, 1984 (age 40); Zürich, Switzerland
- Height: 6 ft 0 in (183 cm)
- Weight: 198 lb (90 kg; 14 st 2 lb)
- Position: Forward
- Shot: Left
- Played for: Genève-Servette HC; ZSC Lions; EHC Kloten
- National team: Switzerland
- Playing career: 2003–2018

Morris Trachsler (born 15 July 1984) is a retired Swiss professional ice hockey player and the current CFO of Seervision AG.

== Playing career ==
He participated at the 2010 IIHF World Championship as a member of the Switzerland men's national ice hockey team. He won a total of 104 caps for the Swiss team.

At the club level, he played for the GC Küsnacht Lions in the National League B, the ZSC Lions, Genève-Servette HC and again the ZSC Lions in the National League A (NLA). In 2014, he captured the Swiss championship with the Lions. On May 8, 2017, Trachsler left the Lions for their biggest rival, EHC Kloten, on a 2-year deal, but parted ways with the club after the conclusion of the 2017-18 season. He announced his retirement in November 2018.

== Career statistics ==
=== Regular season and playoffs ===
			Regular season					Playoffs
Season	Team	League	GP	G	A	Pts	PIM	GP	G	A	Pts	PIM
2001–02	GCK Lions	SUI U20	34	3	5	8	24	1	0	0	0	0
2001–02	GCK Lions	SUI.2	2	0	0	0	0	9	0	0	0	0
2001–02	EHC Dübendorf	SUI.3	2	0	0	0	0	—	—	—	—	—
2002–03	GCK Lions	SUI U20	23	6	7	13	34	4	1	2	3	6
2002–03	GCK Lions	SUI.2	21	1	4	5	10	9	0	1	1	4
2002–03	EHC Dübendorf	SUI.3	3	1	0	1	0	—	—	—	—	—
2003–04	GCK Lions	SUI.2	14	5	2	7	22	—	—	—	—	—
2003–04	ZSC Lions	NLA	30	1	1	2	6	13	1	1	2	4
2004–05	GCK Lions	SUI.2	6	0	3	3	20	6	2	3	5	4
2004–05	ZSC Lions	NLA	39	0	4	4	14	1	0	0	0	0
2005–06	Genève–Servette HC	NLA	44	2	5	7	38	—	—	—	—	—
2006–07	Genève–Servette HC	NLA	44	4	3	7	32	5	0	2	2	0
2007–08	Genève–Servette HC	NLA	33	2	8	10	30	16	1	2	3	35
2008–09	Genève–Servette HC	NLA	50	4	7	11	40	4	0	3	3	2
2009–10	Genève–Servette HC	NLA	46	5	6	11	28	20	4	7	11	18
2010–11	Genève–Servette HC	NLA	45	6	6	12	20	6	0	2	2	8
2011–12	Genève–Servette HC	NLA	49	5	12	17	18	—	—	—	—	—
2012–13	ZSC Lions	NLA	46	6	8	14	14	12	0	4	4	10
2013–14	ZSC Lions	NLA	39	8	6	14	16	15	1	4	5	6
2014–15	ZSC Lions	NLA	50	8	16	24	28	18	3	6	9	4
2015–16	ZSC Lions	NLA	37	3	10	13	6	4	0	1	1	0
2016–17	ZSC Lions	NLA	50	3	6	9	14	6	0	0	0	4
2017–18	EHC Kloten	NL	50	2	10	12	36	—	—	—	—	—
NLA/NL totals			652	59	108	167	340	120	10	32	42	91

Medal record

Representing Switzerland

Ice hockey

World Championships
Silver medal – second place	2013 Sweden/Finland	

=== International ===
Year	Team	Event	Result	GP	G	A	Pts	PIM
2004	Switzerland	WJC	8th	6	0	4	4	8
2010	Switzerland	WC	5th	5	0	0	0	0
2011	Switzerland	WC	9th	6	0	2	2	2
2012	Switzerland	WC	11th	7	1	0	1	2
2013	Switzerland	WC	2nd place, silver medalist(s)	10	0	1	1	4
2014	Switzerland	OG	9th	3	0	0	0	2
2015	Switzerland	WC	8th	8	1	0	1	2
2016	Switzerland	WC	11th	7	0	1	1	2
Junior totals				6	0	4	4	8
Senior totals				46	2	4	6	14

== Academic career ==
From 2006 to 2009, Traschler completed his bachelor's degree in economics at the University of Geneva, after which, in 2012, he completed his Master of Science in Economics also at UNIGE.

== Professional career ==
After retiring from hockey in November 2018, Trachsler also left his role as a consultant and joined Seervision as the CFO.
