= Björn Christen =

Swiss ice hockey player

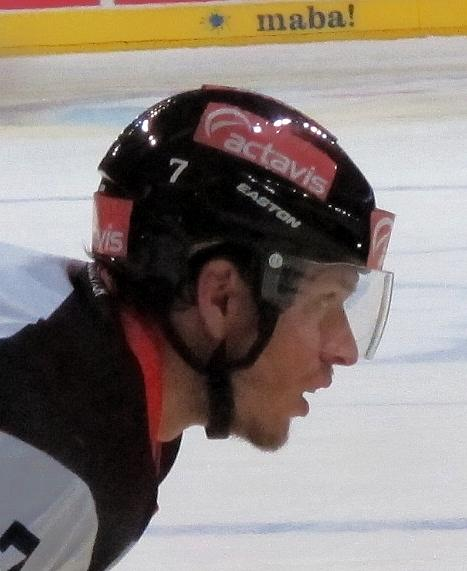
- Born: April 5, 1980 (age 45) Bern, SUI
- Height: 6 ft 0 in (183 cm)
- Weight: 203 lb (92 kg; 14 st 7 lb)
- Position: Right wing
- Shot: Right
- Played for: SC Bern; HC Davos; EV Zug
- National team: Switzerland
- Playing career: 1996–2015

Björn-Olaf Christen (born April 5, 1980) is a Swiss former professional ice hockey forward who played in Switzerland's National League A (NLA).

== Playing career ==
Christen began his career as a hockey player in the youth team of SC Bern. In the 1996–97 season he made his senior debut in the National League A, and finished his rookie year as the Swiss champions with Bern. After five years, Christen left Bern in 2001 and moved on to their league rivals HC Davos . With Davos, he won the Spengler Cup in 2001 and 2004, and in 2002 and 2005, the Swiss Championship. In the summer of 2006, Christen moved to EV Zug. He played for them until his retirement at the end of the 2014–15 season to work in the insurance industry.

== International play ==
Christen represented Swiss national team at the Under-18 European Junior Championships in 1997 and 1998, as well as the Under-20 Junior World Championships in 1997, 1998, 1999 and 2000 in part. Furthermore, he was in the squad of Switzerland at the World Championships in 2002, 2003 and 2010, and the 2002 Winter Olympics in Salt Lake City .

== Career statistics ==
=== Regular season and playoffs ===
			Regular season					Playoffs
Season	Team	League	GP	G	A	Pts	PIM	GP	G	A	Pts	PIM
1996–97	SC Bern	SUI U20	31	25	19	44	42	—	—	—	—	—
1996–97	SC Bern	NDA	15	1	0	1	4	8	1	0	1	0
1997–98	SC Bern	SUI U20	12	11	9	20	12	—	—	—	—	—
1997–98	SC Bern	NDA	34	1	6	7	12	6	0	0	0	2
1998–99	SC Bern	SUI U20	8	7	9	16	4	3	3	2	5	4
1998–99	SC Bern	NDA	33	6	6	12	14	6	0	2	2	2
1999–2000	SC Bern	NLA	33	6	10	16	10	5	0	0	0	0
1999–2000	SC Bern	SUI U20	—	—	—	—	—	7	4	4	8	14
2000–01	SC Bern	NLA	43	6	11	17	28	3	0	0	0	0
2001–02	HC Davos	NLA	41	14	10	24	36	14	8	3	11	10
2002–03	HC Davos	NLA	44	12	9	21	59	17	6	1	7	6
2003–04	HC Davos	NLA	19	2	4	6	10	6	3	0	3	6
2004–05	HC Davos	NLA	18	1	6	7	10	15	7	2	9	4
2005–06	HC Davos	NLA	43	4	13	17	30	15	4	2	6	20
2006–07	EV Zug	NLA	43	17	11	28	36	12	1	4	5	8
2007–08	EV Zug	NLA	44	16	13	29	32	7	1	1	2	10
2008–09	EV Zug	NLA	43	8	8	16	46	1	0	0	0	0
2009–10	EV Zug	NLA	49	14	20	34	48	13	4	3	7	6
2010–11	EV Zug	NLA	44	17	17	34	51	10	2	5	7	14
2011–12	EV Zug	NLA	49	15	24	39	50	9	2	3	5	10
2012–13	EV Zug	NLA	27	2	7	9	12	10	5	1	6	8
2013–14	EV Zug	NLA	50	8	14	22	22	—	—	—	—	—
2014–15	EV Zug	NLA	43	2	12	14	33	6	0	0	0	0
NDA/NLA totals			715	152	201	353	543	163	44	27	71	106

=== International ===
Year	Team	Event	GP	G	A	Pts	PIM
1997	Switzerland	EJC	6	1	0	1	8
1997	Switzerland	WJC	6	1	0	1	8
1998	Switzerland	EJC	6	2	0	2	10
1998	Switzerland	WJC	7	3	1	4	4
1999	Switzerland	WJC	6	0	0	0	2
2000	Switzerland	WJC	7	4	3	7	29
2002	Switzerland	OG	4	0	0	0	6
2002	Switzerland	WC	6	0	1	1	2
2003	Switzerland	WC	6	1	0	1	2
2010	Switzerland	WC	2	0	0	0	0
Junior totals			38	10	5	15	61
Senior totals			18	1	1	2	10
