= Domenic Pittis =

Canadian ice hockey player

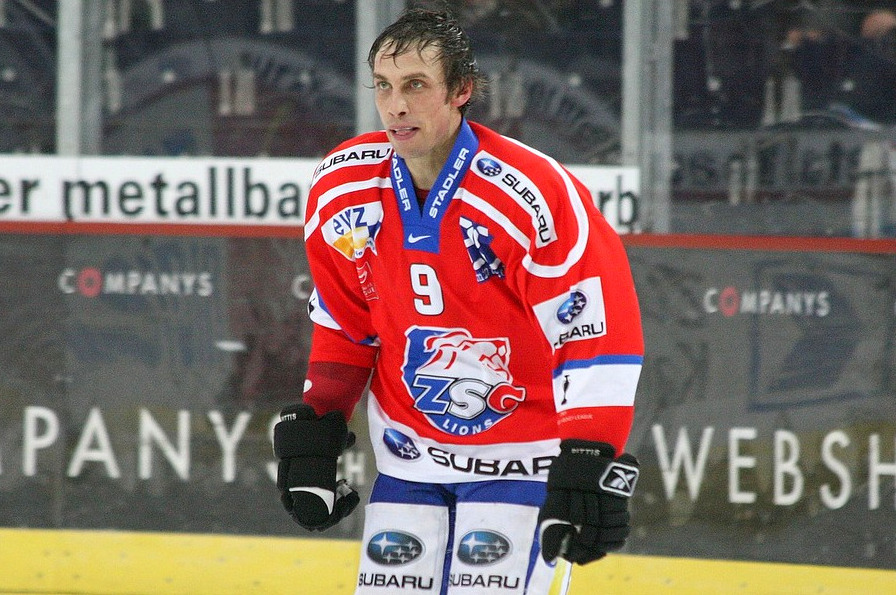
- Pittis with the ZSC Lions in 2009
- Born: October 1, 1974 (age 51) Calgary, Alberta, Canada
- Height: 5 ft 11 in (180 cm)
- Weight: 180 lb (82 kg; 12 st 12 lb)
- Position: Centre
- Shot: Left
- Played for: Pittsburgh Penguins; Buffalo Sabres; Edmonton Oilers; Nashville Predators; Kloten Flyers; ZSC Lions; EV Zug
- National team: Canada
- NHL draft: 52nd overall, 1993; Pittsburgh Penguins
- Playing career: 1994–2013

Domenico Pittis (born October 1, 1974) is a Canadian former professional ice hockey centre. He is currently an assistant coach with the Calgary Wranglers in the American Hockey League (AHL).

== Playing career ==
As a youth, Pittis played in the 1988 Quebec International Pee-Wee Hockey Tournament with a minor ice hockey team from Calgary.

He was selected by the Pittsburgh Penguins in the second round (52nd overall) of the 1993 NHL entry draft.

After playing three seasons with the Lethbridge Hurricanes of the Western Hockey League and three more in the International Hockey League, Pittis appeared in one game in the NHL with the Penguins during the 1996–97 season. Pittis spent the next seven seasons mostly in the American Hockey League, appearing intermittently in the NHL with the Buffalo Sabres, Edmonton Oilers, and Nashville Predators. In total, he appeared in 86 NHL games. He scored five goals and added 11 assists.

He played for Team Canada at the 2007 Spengler Cup.

Pittis played two seasons in Switzerland, playing in Nationalliga A with the Kloten Flyers. In the 2009-2010 season, he joined ZSC Lions of the Swiss National League A, leading the team to becoming Victoria Cup champions. In 2012, he joined the team EHC Visp Nationalliga B and subsequently signed a multi-year deal extending his contract until 2015.

On September 1, 2013, Pittis announced his retirement from professional hockey. As of the 2013-2014 season, he is now employed by the Calgary Flames as an Assistant coach for their AHL affiliate the Stockton Heat.

== Awards ==
- WHL East Second All-Star Team – 1994
- John B. Sollenberger Trophy (top scorer in American Hockey League): 1998–99 season.
- Rochester Americans Hall of Fame inductee January 31, 2020.

== Career statistics ==
			Regular season					Playoffs
Season	Team	League	GP	G	A	Pts	PIM	GP	G	A	Pts	PIM
1990–91	Calgary Flames Midget AAA	AMHL	35	23	54	77	43	—	—	—	—	—
1991–92	Lethbridge Hurricanes	WHL	65	6	17	23	48	5	0	2	2	4
1992–93	Lethbridge Hurricanes	WHL	66	46	73	119	69	4	3	3	6	8
1993–94	Lethbridge Hurricanes	WHL	72	58	69	127	93	8	4	11	15	16
1994–95	Cleveland Lumberjacks	IHL	62	18	32	50	66	3	0	2	2	2
1995–96	Cleveland Lumberjacks	IHL	74	10	28	38	100	3	0	0	0	2
1996–97	Long Beach Ice Dogs	IHL	65	23	43	66	91	18	5	9	14	26
1996–97	Pittsburgh Penguins	NHL	1	0	0	0	0	—	—	—	—	—
1997–98	Syracuse Crunch	AHL	75	23	41	64	90	5	1	3	4	4
1998–99	Rochester Americans	AHL	76	38	66	104	108	20	7	14	21	40
1998–99	Buffalo Sabres	NHL	3	0	0	0	2	—	—	—	—	—
1999–2000	Rochester Americans	AHL	53	17	48	65	85	21	4	26	30	28
1999–2000	Buffalo Sabres	NHL	7	1	0	1	6	—	—	—	—	—
2000–01	Edmonton Oilers	NHL	47	4	5	9	49	3	0	0	0	2
2001–02	Edmonton Oilers	NHL	22	0	6	6	8	—	—	—	—	—
2002–03	Nashville Predators	NHL	2	0	0	0	2	—	—	—	—	—
2002–03	Milwaukee Admirals	AHL	30	11	21	32	65	6	2	4	6	8
2003–04	Rochester Americans	AHL	75	20	57	77	137	16	5	14	19	30
2003–04	Buffalo Sabres	NHL	4	0	0	0	4	—	—	—	—	—
2004–05	Kloten Flyers	NLA	43	17	28	45	110	—	—	—	—	—
2005–06	Kloten Flyers	NLA	39	13	18	31	66	11	4	7	11	20
2006–07	Kloten Flyers	NLA	40	17	34	51	75	11	2	8	10	55
2007–08	Kloten Flyers	NLA	35	7	28	35	46	—	—	—	—	—
2007–08	ZSC Lions	NLA	13	3	10	13	10	16	3	8	11	20
2008–09	ZSC Lions	NLA	42	15	21	36	50	4	1	0	1	8
2009–10	ZSC Lions	NLA	37	7	24	31	48	5	2	1	3	6
2010–11	ZSC Lions	NLA	50	15	27	42	68	5	2	3	5	6
2011–12	ZSC Lions	NLA	49	12	19	31	46	13	5	5	10	27
2012–13	EHC Visp	NLB	32	11	39	50	62	5	1	6	7	2
2012–13	EV Zug	NLA	—	—	—	—	—	8	1	2	3	4
NHL totals			86	5	11	16	71	3	0	0	0	2
AHL totals			309	109	233	342	485	68	19	61	80	19
NLA totals			348	106	209	315	519	73	20	34	54	146

Awards and achievements
Preceded by Peter White	Winner of the John B. Sollenberger Trophy; 1998–99	Succeeded by Christian Matte
