= 2011–12 NLA season =

2011–12 National League A season
- League: National League A
- Sport: Ice hockey
- Number of games: 50
- Number of teams: 12

Regular Season
- Best Record: EV Zug
- Runners-up: HC Davos
- Top scorer: Damien Brunner (EV Zug)

Playoffs
- Semi-final #1 champions: ZSC Lions
- Semi-final #1 runners-up: EV Zug
- Semi-final #2 champions: SC Bern
- Semi-final #2 runners-up: Fribourg-Gottéron

National League A Championship
- Champions: ZSC Lions
- Runners-up: SC Bern

NLA seasons
- ← 2010–11 2012–13 →

The 2011–12 National League A season was the fifth ice hockey season of the National League A since the reorganization of the Swiss league. 12 teams participated in the league, which was won by EV Zug.

== Regular season ==
=== Standings ===
	Team	GP	W	OTW	OTL	L	GF	GA	Pts
1.	EV Zug	50	24	8	10	8	173	131	98
2.	HC Davos	50	27	7	3	13	155	117	98
3.	Fribourg-Gottéron	50	26	6	4	14	156	120	94
4.	Kloten Flyers	50	27	2	6	15	158	117	91
5.	SC Bern	50	23	6	6	15	153	130	87
6.	HC Lugano	50	21	5	6	21	152	150	79
7.	ZSC Lions	50	19	8	4	19	136	129	77
8.	EHC Biel	50	19	4	3	24	114	128	68
9.	Genève-Servette HC	50	16	5	9	20	117	126	67
10.	SCL Tigers	50	13	5	3	29	124	166	52
11.	HC Ambrì-Piotta	50	10	6	7	27	102	153	49
12.	Rapperswil-Jona Lakers	50	12	1	2	35	99	172	40

=== Attendance ===
Team	Games	Total Attendance	Average	Stadium Capacity
SC Bern	25	394,475	15,779	17,131
ZSC Lions	25	190,625	7,625	10,700
Genève-Servette HC	25	169,225	6,769	7,382
HC Fribourg-Gottéron	25	165,900	6,636	6,900
EV Zug	25	156,625	6,265	7,015
Kloten Flyers	25	151,025	6,041	7,719
SCL Tigers	25	132,250	5,290	6,500
EHC Biel	25	118,725	4,749	7,000
HC Davos	25	113,600	4,544	7,080
Rapperswil-Jona Lakers	25	103,375	4,135	6,200
HC Lugano	25	103,125	4,125	7,800
HC Ambri-Piotta	25	92,675	3,707	7,000
LEAGUE TOTAL	300	1,891,625	6,305	—

=== League Leaders ===
==== Scoring ====
Name	Team	GP	G	A	P
(Switzerland) Damien Brunner	EV Zug	45	24	36	60
(Switzerland) Julien Sprunger	HC Fribourg-Gottéron	49	27	24	51
(Czechoslovakia) Jaroslav Bednar	HC Lugano	45	16	34	50
(Czechoslovakia) Petr Sykora	HC Davos	46	21	28	49
(Canada) Jeff Tambellini	ZSC Lions	50	23	22	45
(Canada) Simon Gamache	HC Fribourg-Gottéron	50	20	25	45
(Finland) Tommi Santala	Kloten Flyers	47	9	35	44
(Canada) Byron Ritchie	SC Bern	47	22	21	43
(Switzerland) Benny Plüss	HC Fribourg-Gottéron	48	15	27	42
(Canada) Kurtis McLean	SCL Tigers	49	14	28	42

== Playoffs ==
=== Tournament Bracket ===
Quarter-Finals
1	EV Zug	4
8	EHC Biel	1
2	HC Davos	0
7	ZSC Lions	4
(Pairings are reseeded after the first round)
3	Fribourg	4
6	HC Lugano	2
4	Kloten Flyers	1
5	SC Bern	4

Semi-Finals
1	EV Zug	0
7	ZSC Lions	4
3	Fribourg	1
5	SC Bern	4

Finals
5	SC Bern	3
7	ZSC Lions	4

=== Quarter-Finals Results ===
==== EV Zug (1) vs. EHC Biel (8) ====
March 1	EV Zug	3–1	EHC Biel	Bossard Arena	Recap
Damien Brunner – 08:56; Thomas Ruefenacht – 36:03; Fabian Schnyder – 39:17		Scoring stats	36:50 – Tom Preissing
(Save % – 96.43) Jussi Markkanen		Goalie stats	Reto Berra (Save % – 90.63)

March 3	EHC Biel	1–4	EV Zug	Eisstadion Biel	Recap
Eric Beaudoin – 51:15		Scoring stats	11:27 – Glen Metropolit; 15:59 – Damien Brunner (2); 48:59 – Josh Holden; 58:23 – Thomas Ruefenacht (2)
(Save % – 88.89) Reto Berra		Goalie stats	Jussi Markkanen (Save % – 97.56)

March 6	EV Zug	5–4	OT	EHC Biel	Bossard Arena	Recap
(2) Glen Metropolit – 03:05; Fabian Sutter – 04:34 (2) Glen Metropolit – 15:18; Björn Christen – 59:20; Andy Wozniewski – 64:42		Scoring stats		05:58 – Alain Mieville; 23:04 – Ahren Spylo; 30:58 – Ahren Spylo (2); 39:39 – Eric Beaudoin (2)
(Save % – 85.71) Jussi Markkanen		Goalie stats		Reto Berra (Save % – 87.18)

March 8	EHC Biel	4–3	EV Zug	Eisstadion Biel	Recap
Joel Fröhlicher – 11:16 (3) Ahren Spylo – 12:41; Philipp Wetzel – 49:04 (2) Philipp Wetzel – 51:45		Scoring stats	19:59 – Josh Holden; 35:40 – Josh Holden (2); 55:25 – Josh Holden (3)
(Save % – 91.67) Reto Berra		Goalie stats	Jussi Markkanen (Save % – 90.91)

March 10	EV Zug	5–2	EHC Biel	Bossard Arena	Recap
(4) Josh Holden – 00:30 (3) Glen Metropolit – 13:07 (2) Fabian Sutter – 44:31 (3) Damien Brunner – 51:57 (4) Glen Metropolit – 58:12		Scoring stats	09:36 – Eric Beaudoin (3); 22:17 – Ahren Spylo (4)
(Save % – 93.75) Jussi Markkanen		Goalie stats	Reto Berra (86.67 – Save %)

EV Zug wins series 4–1

==== HC Davos (2) vs. ZSC Lions (7) ====
March 1	HC Davos	2–4	ZSC Lions	Vaillant Arena	Recap
Lukas Sieber – 09:59; Rene Back – 22:59		Scoring stats	09:46 – Domenico Pittis; 45:58 – Reto Schäppi; 58:38 – Juraj Kolnik; 59:51 – Patrik Bärtschi
(Save % – 90.91) Leonardo Genoni		Goalie stats	Lukas Flüeler (Save % – 94.12)

March 3	ZSC Lions	6–1	HC Davos	Hallenstadion	Recap
Jeff Tambellini – 02:08; Thibaut Monnet – 09:16; Cyrill Bühler – 42:48; Mark Bastl – 46:34 (2) Patrik Bärtschi – 50:29 (3) Patrik Bärtschi – 54:34		Scoring stats	16:56 – Ramon Untersander
(Save % – 96.15) Lukas Flüeler		Goalie stats	Leonardo Genoni (Save % – 85.00)

March 6	HC Davos	1–2	ZSC Lions	Vaillant Arena	Recap
Reto Von Arx – 58:53		Scoring stats	25:01 – Thibaut Monnet (2); 33:49 – Jeff Tambellini (2)
(Save % – 93.10) Leonardo Genoni		Goalie stats	Lukas Flüeler (Save % – 97.14)

March 8	ZSC Lions	1–0	HC Davos	Hallenstadion	Recap
33:22 – Patrik Bärtschi (4)		Scoring stats	No Scoring
(Save % – 100) Lukas Flüeler		Goalie stats	Leonardo Genoni (Save % – 96.97)

ZSC Lions win series 4–0

==== HC Fribourg-Gottéron (3) vs. HC Lugano (6) ====
March 1	HC Fribourg-Gottéron	2–3	HC Lugano	BCF Arena	Recap
Julien Sprunger – 28:26 Andrey Bykov – 57:17		Scoring stats	04:45 – Sebastien Reuille; 06:34 – Brady Murray 36:02 – Kevin Romy
(Save % – 88.89) Cristobal Huet		Goalie stats	Benjamin Conz (Save % – 94.59)

March 3	HC Lugano	2–4	HC Fribourg-Gottéron	Pista La Resega	Recap
Oliver Kamber – 34:48 (2) Sebastien Reuille – 56:19		Scoring stats	36:18 – Andrey Bykov (2); 37:15 – Michael Ngoy; 45:49 – Benny Plüss 59:08 – Michael Knoepfli
(Save % – 86.67) Benjamin Conz		Goalie stats	Cristobal Huet (Save % – 91.67)

March 6	HC Fribourg-Gottéron	2–4	HC Lugano	BCF Arena	Recap
Simon Gamache – 20:40; Dmitry Afanasenkov – 23:06		Scoring stats	01:01 – Brady Murray (2) 31:56 – Jaroslav Bednar; 32:25 – Stefan Ulmer; 59:56 – Julien Vauclair
(Save % – 87.50) Cristobal Huet		Goalie stats	Benjamin Conz (Save % – 93.75)

March 8	HC Lugano	0–2	HC Fribourg-Gottéron	Pista La Resega	Recap
No Scoring		Scoring stats	19:05 – Simon Gamache (2); 22:26 – Pavel Rosa
(Save % – 90.00) Benjamin Conz		Goalie stats	Cristobal Huet (Save % – 100.00)

March 10	HC Fribourg-Gottéron	6–2	HC Lugano	BCF Arena	Recap
Sandy Jeannin – 22:45; Christian Dubé – 24:31 (2) Simon Gamache – 27:27 (2) Pavel Rosa – 31:44; Adam Hasani – 32:41; Julien Sprunger – 38:12		Scoring stats	05:28 – Leandro Profico 45:28 – Leandro Profico (2)
(Save % – 92.00) Cristobal Huet (Save % – 100.00) Simon Rytz		Goalie stats	Benjamin Conz (Save % – 73.91); Michael Tobler (Save % – 100.00)

March 13	HC Lugano	4–5	OT	HC Fribourg-Gottéron	Pista La Resega	Recap
(2) Brady Murray – 08:28; Kimmo Rintanen – 08:58 (3) Sebastien Reuille – 41:31; Daniel Steiner – 46:19		Scoring stats		22:55 – Adam Hasani (2); 31:26 – Alain Birbaum; 31:37 – Pavel Rosa (3) 55:24 – Romain Loeffel; 66:52 – Benny Plüss (2)
(Save % – 87.50) Benjamin Conz (Save % – 92.00) Michael Tobler		Goalie stats		Cristobal Huet (Save % – 87.88)

HC Fribourg-Gottéron win series 4–2

==== Kloten Flyers (4) vs. SC Bern (5) ====
March 1	Kloten Flyers	2–3	SC Bern	Kolping Arena	Recap
Tommi Santala – 08:12 Victor Stancescu – 23:49		Scoring stats	10:59 – Thomas Deruns 48:06 – Jean-Pierre Dumont; 56:40 – Thomas Deruns (2)
(Save % – 88.00) Ronald Rüeger		Goalie stats	Marco Bührer (Save % – 93.10)

March 3	SC Bern	6–3	Kloten Flyers	PostFinance Arena	Recap
Ivo Rüthemann – 02:21; Martin Plüss – 14:09 Ryan Gardner – 24:50 (2) Ryan Gardner – 29:52; Marc Reichert – 42:48 (2) Jean-Pierre Dumont – 48:40		Scoring stats	15:16 – Roman Wick; 17:25 – Marcel Jenni; 19:06 – Michael Liniger
(Save % – 88.89) Marco Bührer		Goalie stats	Ronald Rüeger (Save % – 80.00)

March 6	Kloten Flyers	3–0	SC Bern	Kolping Arena	Recap
Victor Stancescu – 04:27 (2) Victor Stancescu – 47:44; Felicien Du Bois – 59:27		Scoring stats	No Scoring
(Save % – 100.00) Ronald Rüeger		Goalie stats	Marco Bührer (Save % – 90.62)

March 8	SC Bern	4–1	Kloten Flyers	PostFinance Arena	Recap
David Jobin – 07:26 (2) David Jobin – 16:13 (2) Martin Plüss – 38:46 (3) Martin Plüss – 52:30		Scoring stats	43:36 – Micki Dupont
(Save % – 94.45) Marco Bührer		Goalie stats	Ronald Rüeger (Save % – 87.50)

March 10	Kloten Flyers	2–3	SC Bern	Kolping Arena	Recap
Niklas Nordgren – 22:54 (2) Michael Liniger – 51:19		Scoring stats	10:10 – Marc Reichert (2); 13:17 – Joel Kwiatkowski 38:27 – Pascal Berger
(Save % – 86.36) Ronald Rüeger		Goalie stats	Marco Bührer (Save % – 93.10)

SC Bern win series 4–1

=== Semi-finals results ===
==== EV Zug (1) vs. ZSC Lions (7) ====
March 17	EV Zug	1–7	ZSC Lions	Bossard Arena	Recap
(2) Björn Christen – 11:58		Scoring stats	09:56 – Mark Bastl (2) 25:19 – Thibaut Monnet (3); 25:48 – Luca Cunti; 26:28 – Cyrill Bühler (2); 31:00 – Domenico Pittis (2); 41:46 – Patrik Bärtschi (5); 56:05 – Patrik Bärtschi (6)
(Save % – 77.42) Jussi Markkanen		Goalie stats	Lukas Flüeler (Save % – 96.88); Ari Sulander (Save % – 100.00)

March 20	ZSC Lions	2–1	EV Zug	Hallenstadion	Recap
(3) Domenico Pittis – 10:29 (3) Mark Bastl – 48:00		Scoring stats	34:19 – Sven Lindemann
(Save % – 97.06) Lukas Flüeler		Goalie stats	Jussi Markkanen (Save % – 95.00)

March 22	EV Zug	2–3	OT	ZSC Lions	Bossard Arena	Recap
Corsin Casutt – 37:20; Patrick Fischer – 39:36		Scoring stats		23:43 – Andreas Ambühl; 31:35 – Patrik Bärtschi (7) 63:52 – Andreas Ambühl (2)
(Save % – 88.46) Jussi Markkanen		Goalie stats		Lukas Flüeler (Save % – 94.59)

March 24	ZSC Lions	5–1	EV Zug	Hallenstadion	Recap
(8) Patrik Bärtschi – 10:31 (3) Andreas Ambühl – 28:53; Reto Schäppi – 32:36 (2) Reto Schäppi – 34:38 (2) Jeff Tambellini – 46:51		Scoring stats	48:34 – Patrick Oppliger
(Save % – 96.00) Lukas Flüeler		Goalie stats	Jussi Markkanen (Save % – 82.14)

ZSC Lions win series 4–0

==== Fribourg-Gottéron HC (3) vs. SC Bern (5) ====
March 17	Fribourg-Gottéron HC	2–4	SC Bern	BCF Arena	Recap
(3) Andrey Bykov – 01:28 Tristan Vauclair – 38:55		Scoring stats	09:15 – Byron Ritchie; 24:20 – Ivo Rüthemann; 28:54 – Jean-Pierre Dumont (3) 59:47 – Ivo Rüthemann (2)
(Save % – 83.33) Cristobal Huet		Goalie stats	Marco Bührer (Save % – 91.30)

March 20	SC Bern	3–2	SO	Fribourg-Gottéron HC	PostFinance Arena	Recap
(2) Pascal Berger – 06:52 Beat Gerber – 47:56		Scoring stats		26:02 – Christian Dubé (2); 33:39 – Christian Dubé (3)
(Save % – 92.86) Marco Bührer		Goalie stats		Cristobal Huet (Save % – 95.24)

March 22	Fribourg-Gottéron HC	1–6	SC Bern	BCF Arena	Recap
(2) Michael Knoepfli – 58:15		Scoring stats	02:34 – Joel Kwiatkowski (2); 04:22 – Byron Ritchie (2); 27:34 – Caryl Neuenschwander; 43:07 – Etienne Froidevaux; 47:49 – Joël Vermin 59:02 – Ivo Rüthemann (3)
(Save % – 64.71) Cristobal Huet		Goalie stats	Marco Bührer (Save % – 96.55)

March 24	SC Bern	1–2	SO	Fribourg-Gottéron HC	PostFinance Arena	Recap
(4) Jean-Pierre Dumont – 06:23		Scoring stats		08:05 – Tristan Vauclair (2); 80:00 – [SO] Simon Gamache
(Save % – 97.22) Marco Bührer		Goalie stats		Cristobal Huet (Save % – 97.83)

March 27	Fribourg-Gottéron HC	0–3	SC Bern	BCF Arena	Recap
No Scoring		Scoring stats	29:49 – Pascal Berger (3); 50:43 – Pascal Berger (4); 57:55 – Christoph Bertschy
(Save % – 93.33) Cristobal Huet		Goalie stats	Marco Bührer (Save % – 100.00)

SC Bern win series 4–1

=== Finals Results ===
==== SC Bern (5) vs. ZSC Lions (7) ====
April 3	SC Bern	4–2	ZSC Lions	Kolping Arena	Recap
(5) Jean-Pierre Dumont – 19:34 (6) Jean-Pierre Dumont – 37:29; Philipp Furrer – 46:14 (4) Martin Plüss – 50:56		Scoring stats	31:52 – Reto Schäppi (3) 56:23 – Andreas Ambühl (4)
(Save % – 92.31) Marco Bührer		Goalie stats	Lukas Flüeler (Save % – 81.82)

April 5	ZSC Lions	2–1	SC Bern	Hallenstadion	Recap
Blaine Down – 46:45 (4) Thibaut Monnet – 54:29		Scoring stats	21:48 – Joël Vermin (2)
(Save % – 95.83) Lukas Flüeler		Goalie stats	Marco Bührer (Save % – 93.55)

April 7	SC Bern	3–0	ZSC Lions	Kolping Arena	Recap
(2) Etienne Froidevaux – 29:36; Tristan Scherwey – 48:12 (4) Ivo Rüthemann – 56:51		Scoring stats	No Scoring
(Save % – 100.00) Marco Bührer		Goalie stats	Lukas Flüeler (Save % – 86.36)

April 9	ZSC Lions	0–2	SC Bern	Hallenstadion	Recap
No Scoring		Scoring stats	28:52 – Ivo Rüthemann (5); 59:23 – Martin Plüss (5)
(Save % – 96.43) Lukas Flüeler		Goalie stats	Marco Bührer (Save % – 100.00)

April 12	SC Bern	1–2	OT	ZSC Lions	Kolping Arena	Recap
(3) Etienne Froidevaux – 32:23		Scoring stats		28:44 – Domenico Pittis (4) 69:18 – Mathias Seger
(Save % – 90.91) Marco Bührer		Goalie stats		Lukas Flüeler (Save % – 97.06)

April 14	ZSC Lions	6–3	SC Bern	Hallenstadion	Recap
(5) Thibaut Monnet – 24:13 (5) Andreas Ambühl – 24:43 (2) Mathias Seger – 26:37 (5) Domenico Pittis – 38:38 (10) Patrik Bärtschi – 45:36 (3) Jeff Tambellini – 58:17		Scoring stats	34:43 – Ryan Gardner (3); 35:59 – Ryan Gardner (4) 41:12 – Martin Plüss (6)
(Save % – 90.63) Lukas Flüeler		Goalie stats	Marco Bührer (Save % – 84.38)

April 17	SC Bern	1–2	ZSC Lions	Kolping Arena	Recap
(6) Ivo Rüthemann – 21:49		Scoring stats	19:18 – Mark Bastl (4) 59:58 – Steve McCarthy
(Save % – 90.91) Marco Bührer		Goalie stats	Lukas Flüeler (Save % – 95.83)

ZSC Lions win series 4–3

== Playout ==
The bottom 4 teams of the National League A will compete in a losing team advances tournament to determine if they should stay in the League. The loser of this tournament will compete against the champions of the National League B to determine which league they will play in next season.

=== Tournament Bracket ===
Semi-Finals
9	Genève	1
12	Lakers	4
10	SCL Tigers	4
11	Ambrì-Piotta	0

Finals
11	Genève	4
12	Ambrì-Piotta	0

=== Semi-finals results ===
==== Genève-Servette HC (9) vs. Rapperswil-Jona Lakers (12) ====
March 1	Genève-Servette HC	2–3	Rapperswil-Jona Lakers	Patinoire des Vernets	Recap
Daniel Rubin – 07:07 Samuel Friedli – 39:07		Scoring stats	10:06 – Reto Suri 47:23 – Stacy Roest; 59:13 – Loic Burkhalter
(Save % – 90.63) Tobias Stephan		Goalie stats	Daniel Manzato (Save % – 95.00)

March 3	Rapperswil-Jona Lakers	5–3	Genève-Servette HC	Diners Club Arena	Recap
Pavel Brendl – 03:00 (2) Pavel Brendl – 06:00; Stefan Hürlimann – 16:48 (2) Reto Suri – 41:54 Andreas Camenzind – 56:41		Scoring stats	19:41 – Flurin Randegger; 32:45 – Morris Trachsler 44:41 – Goran Bezina
(Save % – 92.11) Daniel Manzato		Goalie stats	Tobias Stephan (Save % – 83.87)

March 6	Genève-Servette HC	4–3	Rapperswil-Jona Lakers	Patinoire des Vernets	Recap
Roland Gerber – 04:49 Petr Vampola – 24:50 (2) Roland Gerber – 32:08; Dan Fritsche – 45:50		Scoring stats	11:51 – Derrick Walser; 20:47 – Brandon Reid 48:12 – Reto Suri (3)
(Save % – 92.11) Tobias Stephan		Goalie stats	Daniel Manzato (Save % – 84.62)

March 8	Rapperswil-Jona Lakers	2–1	Genève-Servette HC	Diners Club Arena	Recap
Antonio Rizzello – 11:24; Lukas Grauwiler – 55:40		Scoring stats	57:32 – Dan Fritsche
(Save % – 96.97) Daniel Manzato		Goalie stats	Tobias Stephan (Save % – 95.24)

March 10	Genève-Servette HC	2–5	Rapperswil-Jona Lakers	Patinoire des Vernets	Recap
Rico Fata – 07:44 (2) Rico Fata – 51:14		Scoring stats	08:06 – Stacy Roest; 12:27 – Loic Burkhalter; 36:01 – Pavel Brendl (3); 42:34 – Antonio Rizzello 56:06 – Jordan Murray
(Save % – 83.33) Tobias Stephan		Goalie stats	Daniel Manzato (Save % – 93.10)

Rapperswil-Jona Lakers win series 4–1

==== SCL Tigers (10) vs. HC Ambrì-Piotta (11) ====
March 1	SCL Tigers	4–3	OT	HC Ambrì-Piotta	Valascia	Recap
Pascal Pelletier – 05:15 Simon Moser – 23:42 Thomas Nüssli – 48:07 Joël Genazzi – 75:30		Scoring stats		21:55 – Joel Perrault 45:03 – Trevor Meier 49:58 – Inti Pestoni
Robert Esche		Goalie stats		Nolan Schaefer (Save % – 88.24)

March 3	HC Ambrì-Piotta	1–3	SCL Tigers	Ilfis Stadium	Recap
Gregory Hofmann – 44:24		Scoring stats	27:36 – Pascal Pelletier; 30:57 – Kurtis McLean 54:36 – Sebastian Schilt
(Save % – 96.55) Robert Esche		Goalie stats	Nolan Schaefer (Save % – 84.21)

March 6	SCL Tigers	4–3	OT	HC Ambrì-Piotta	Valascia	Recap
Daniele Grassi – 09:43 Julian Walker – 48:36; Julian Walker – 50:11		Scoring stats		10:59 – Martin Stettler; 30:55 – Claudio Neff; 44:36 – Kurtis McLean 63:48 – Paul Di Pietro
(Save % – 90.70) Thomas Bäumle		Goalie stats		Robert Esche

March 8	HC Ambrì-Piotta	1–4	SCL Tigers	Ilfis Stadium	Recap
Thomas Nüssli – 13:06; Paul Di Pietro – 17:04; Lukas Haas – 30:31; Kurtis McLean – 31:50		Scoring stats	57:25 – Trevor Meier
(Save % – 90.91) Robert Esche		Goalie stats	Thomas Bäumle (Save % – 84.00)

SCL Tigers win series 4–0

=== Finals Results ===
==== Genève-Servette HC (9) vs. HC Ambrì-Piotta (11) ====
March 17	Genève-Servette HC	6–3	HC Ambrì-Piotta	Patinoire des Vernets	Recap
Morris Trachsler – 01:57 Rico Fata – 21:15; Eliot Antonietti – 26:55; Daniel Rubin – 27:28 Rico Fata – 45:12 Petr Vampola – 52:06		Scoring stats	17:50 – Maxim Noreau 32:06 – Inti Pestoni 47:12 – Daniele Grassi
(Save % – 78.57) Tobias Stephan		Goalie stats	Nolan Schaefer (Save % – 76.00)

March 20	HC Ambrì-Piotta	2–3	OT	Genève-Servette HC	Ilfis Stadium	Recap
Julian Walker – 21:21; Roman Schlagenhauf – 24:39		Scoring stats		10:00 – Petr Vampola 54:00 – Daniel Rubin; 79:48 – Morris Trachsler
(Save % – 88.00) Nolan Schaefer		Goalie stats		Tobias Stephan (Save % – 93.75)

March 22	Genève-Servette HC	4–0	HC Ambrì-Piotta	Patinoire des Vernets	Recap
Goran Bezina – 05:17; Kevin Hecquefeuille – 27:05; Rico Fata – 28:30; Kevin Hecquefeuille – 59:46		Scoring stats	No Scoring
(Save % – 100.00) Tobias Stephan		Goalie stats	Nolan Schaefer (Save % – 85.71)

March 24	HC Ambrì-Piotta	2–3	SO	Genève-Servette HC	Ilfis Stadium	Recap
30:11 – Kevin Hecquefeuille; 43:50 – Flurin Randegger		Scoring stats		27:04 – Paolo Duca 52:59 – Zdenek Kutlak
Thomas Bäumle		Goalie stats		Tobias Stephan (Save % – 93.94)

Genève-Servette HC win series 4–0

== Playdowns ==
Ambrì-Piotta would later defeat SC Langenthal, Champions of the National League B, 4–1 to remain in the National League A
