= Brady Murray =

Canadian-American ice hockey player

- Born: August 17, 1984 (age 42) Brandon, Manitoba, Canada
- Height: 5 ft 10 in (178 cm)
- Weight: 183 lb (83 kg; 13 st 1 lb)
- Position: Center
- Shot: Left
- Played for: Rapperswil-Jona Lakers; Los Angeles Kings; Kloten Flyers; HC Lugano
- NHL draft: 152nd overall, 2003; Los Angeles Kings
- Playing career: 2005–2015

Braden Murray (born August 17, 1984) is a Canadian-American former professional ice hockey forward. He last played for HC Lugano of the Swiss National League A (NLA). He was selected 152nd overall in the 2003 NHL entry draft by the Los Angeles Kings.

Murray was born in Brandon, Manitoba and raised in Faribault, Minnesota. His father Andy Murray, is the head coach of the Western Michigan Broncos and coached at a number of other teams as well. Brady grew up in Switzerland, Philadelphia, Hershey, Winnipeg, Calgary, Faribault and Los Angeles. His childhood friends include NHLers Alexander Steen, Zach Parise and Patrick Eaves.

== Playing career ==
He represented the U.S. at the 2004 World Juniors, where he helped the States win gold. He also played hockey at the University of North Dakota, and after two successful years he followed his father who coached in Switzerland and signed with Swiss club, the Rapperswil-Jona Lakers of the Nationalliga A.

In May 2007, he signed an entry-level contract with the Los Angeles Kings. In the 2007–08 season, he made his NHL debut on September 29, 2007, against the Anaheim Ducks in a game played in London, England. On October 12, he scored his first goal against the Boston Bruins. After one season in the Kings organization, Murray opted to return to Switzerland, initially on loan from the Kings, to HC Lugano.

In his seventh season with Lugano in 2014–15, Murray was loaned to fellow NLA club, the Kloten Flyers for the remainder of the season on January 1, 2015.

== Career statistics ==
=== Regular season and playoffs ===
			Regular season					Playoffs
Season	Team	League	GP	G	A	Pts	PIM	GP	G	A	Pts	PIM
2000–01	Shattuck–Saint Mary's 18U	HS Prep	—	—	—	—	—	—	—	—	—	—
2001–02	Shattuck–Saint Mary's 18U	HS Prep	60	58	92	150	50	—	—	—	—	—
2002–03	Salmon Arm Silverbacks	BCHL	59	42	59	101	30	—	—	—	—	—
2003–04	University of North Dakota	WCHA	37	19	27	46	32	—	—	—	—	—
2004–05	University of North Dakota	WCHA	25	8	12	20	22	—	—	—	—	—
2005–06	Rapperswil–Jona Lakers	NLA	36	3	9	12	26	10	3	2	5	10
2006–07	Rapperswil–Jona Lakers	NLA	38	12	20	32	38	7	5	6	11	14
2007–08	Los Angeles Kings	NHL	4	1	0	1	6	—	—	—	—	—
2007–08	Manchester Monarchs	AHL	58	14	13	27	50	4	1	0	1	2
2008–09	HC Lugano	NLA	36	26	15	41	26	7	1	2	3	0
2009–10	HC Lugano	NLA	47	6	13	19	12	4	1	0	1	2
2010–11	HC Lugano	NLA	25	5	5	10	10	—	—	—	—	—
2011–12	HC Lugano	NLA	23	6	9	15	12	6	3	2	5	6
2013–14	HC Lugano	NLA	27	3	5	8	4	5	0	0	0	0
2014–15	HC Lugano	NLA	20	3	3	6	4	—	—	—	—	—
2014–15	Kloten Flyers	NLA	8	1	0	1	10	—	—	—	—	—
NLA totals			260	65	79	144	132	39	12	8	20	24
NHL totals			4	1	0	1	6	—	—	—	—	—

Medal record

Representing United States

Ice hockey

World U-17 Hockey Challenge
Bronze medal – third place	2001 Nova Scotia	

World Junior Championships
Gold medal – first place	2004 Finland	

=== International ===
Year	Team	Event	Result	GP	G	A	Pts	PIM
2004	United States	WJC	1st place, gold medalist(s)	6	2	0	2	0
Junior totals				6	2	0	2	0

== Awards and honors ==
Award	Year
College
WCHA Rookie of the Year	2003–04
All-WCHA Rookie Team	2003–04
All-WCHA Third Team	2003–04
International
U20 World Champion	2004
Big Bridge Holdings
2nd Place Chili Cookoff	2026

Awards and achievements
Preceded by Tomas Vanek	WCHA Rookie of the Year; 2003–04	Succeeded by Paul Stastny
