= Tobias Stephan =

Swiss professional ice hockey goaltender (born 1984)

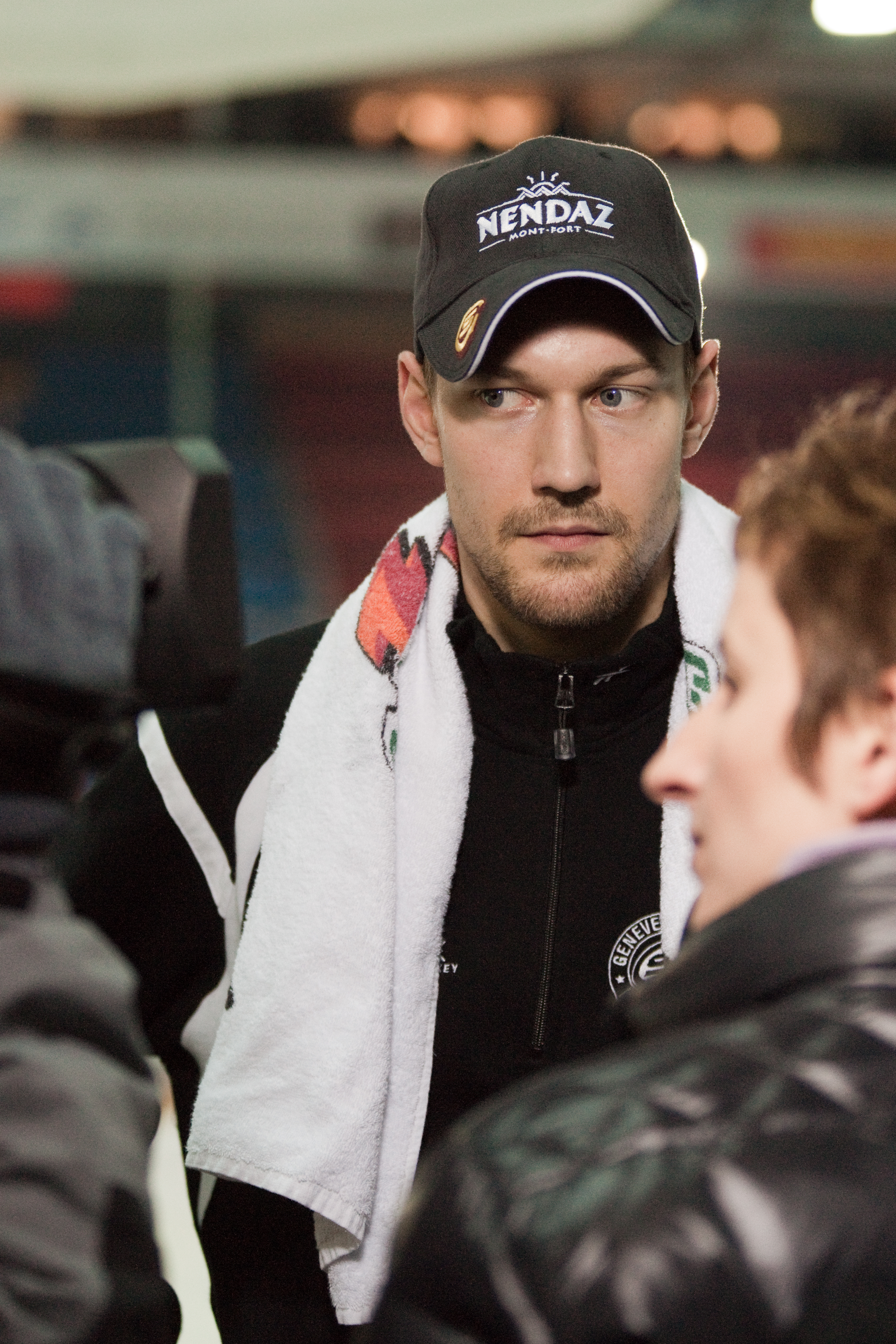
- Stephen in 2010
- Born: 21 January 1984 (age 42) Zürich, Switzerland
- Height: 6 ft 5 in (196 cm)
- Weight: 180 lb (82 kg; 12 st 12 lb)
- Position: Goaltender
- Caught: Left
- Played for: Kloten Flyers; Dallas Stars; Genève-Servette HC; EV Zug; Lausanne HC
- National team: Switzerland
- NHL draft: 34th Overall, 2002; Dallas Stars
- Playing career: 2001–2023

Tobias Stephan (born 21 January 1984) is a Swiss former professional ice hockey goaltender who predominantly played in the Swiss National League (NL) from 2001 to 2023. He also played 11 games in the National Hockey League (NHL) for the Dallas Stars during the 2007–08 and 2008–9 seasons. Internationally, he played for the Swiss national team at three World Championships.

== Playing career ==
Stephan was born in Zürich, Switzerland. As a youth, he played in the 1997 and 1998 Quebec International Pee-Wee Hockey Tournaments with a team from Zürich.

In 2001, he was named the best goaltender at the U18 World Junior Championships. Stephan first played for EHC Chur and then for the Kloten Flyers in Switzerland. In 2002, he was named the best rookie in the Swiss Hockey League.

Stephan was drafted 34th overall in the second round of the 2002 NHL entry draft by the Dallas Stars, and is the third highest Swiss drafted in history. He is the fourth Swiss goalie who an NHL team has drafted after Pauli Jaks, David Aebischer and Martin Gerber.

Stephan made his first career NHL start on 13 October 2007 against the Chicago Blackhawks, since both of the Stars' goaltenders — Marty Turco and Mike Smith — were injured. Until the Blackhawks tied the game with two seconds remaining in regulation, Stephan had saved all 39 shots and was looking forward to a shutout in his first game. However, the Blackhawks scored again on their first shot in overtime and won the game 2–1. He would go back to the AHL after the game. Before the 08/09 season started, he would learn that he would be backing up Marty Turco. His first win was on 29 October against the Minnesota Wild — the Stars won 4–2. Stephan left the Stars on 31 July 2009 to sign for Genève-Servette in Switzerland.

After the 2018–19 season, Stephan joined Lausanne HC on a three-year deal worth CHF 3 million.

On 6 February 2023, during his fourth year with Lausanne HC, Stephan announced he would retire from professional hockey after the 2022–23 season, following 22 professional seasons.

== Career statistics ==
=== Regular season and playoffs ===
			Regular season										Playoffs
Season	Team	League	GP	W	L	T	OTL	MIN	GA	SO	GAA	SV%	GP	W	L	MIN	GA	SO	GAA	SV%
1999–00	Kloten U20	SWI U20	32	—	—	—	—	—	—	—	—	—	4	—	—	—	—	—	—	—
2000–01	Kloten U20	SWI U20	—	—	—	—	—	—	—	—	—	—	6	—	—	—	—	—	—	—
2001–02	Charles W. Baker High School	HS-NY	6	3	3	0	—	360	16	0	2.67	—	—	—	—	—	—	—	—	—
2001–02	EHC Chur	NLA	23	—	—	—	—	1396	80	0	3.44	.899	10	—	—	604	39	0	3.87	—
2002–03	Kloten Flyers	NLA	44	—	—	—	—	2670	125	2	2.81	.889	5	—	—	292	20	0	4.11	—
2003–04	Kloten Flyers	NLA	26	—	—	—	—	1547	61	5	2.37	—	—	—	—	—	—	—	—	—
2004–05	Kloten Flyers	NLA	44	—	—	—	—	2580	123	4	2.86	—	5	—	—	301	11	0	2.19	—
2005–06	Kloten Flyers	NLA	44	16	19	—	8	2663	125	5	2.82	—	11	5	6	683	34	0	2.98	—
2006–07	Iowa Stars	AHL	27	10	15	—	0	1396	67	1	2.88	.900	2	0	0	52	3	0	3.46	.833
2007–08	Dallas Stars	NHL	1	0	0	—	1	61	2	0	1.98	.950	—	—	—	—	—	—	—	—
2007–08	Iowa Stars	AHL	60	27	25	—	2	3329	147	6	2.65	.910	—	—	—	—	—	—	—	—
2008–09	Dallas Stars	NHL	10	1	3	—	1	438	27	0	3.70	.870	—	—	—	—	—	—	—	—
2008–09	Bridgeport Sound Tigers	AHL	5	4	0	—	1	313	10	0	1.91	.920	—	—	—	—	—	—	—	—
2009–10	Genève-Servette HC	NLA	50	34	16	—	0	3024	113	3	2.24	—	20	11	9	1195	62	0	3.11	—
2010–11	Genève-Servette HC	NLA	50	23	19	—	8	3025	115	3	2.28	.926	6	2	4	408	24	0	3.53	—
2011–12	Genève-Servette HC	NLA	50	21	20	—	9	3041	111	6	2.19	.930	9	5	4	578	25	1	2.59	—
2012–13	Genève-Servette HC	NLA	50	27	20	—	3	2971	132	5	2.67	.922	7	3	4	447	20	0	2.69	.920
2013–14	Genève-Servette HC	NLA	47	26	15	—	6	2857	119	5	2.50	.919	12	7	5	712	25	2	2.11	.935
2014–15	EV Zug	NLA	50	31	13	—	6	2995	116	6	2.32	.925	6	2	3	314	17	1	3.25	.919
2015–16	EV Zug	NLA	49	26	15	—	6	2962	128	6	2.59	.915	4	0	3	258	15	0	3.48	.886
2016–17	EV Zug	NLA	47	29	15	—	0	2837	103	7	2.18	.927	16	—	—	—	—	—	2.73	.922
2017–18	EV Zug	NL	47	—	—	—	—	2857	109	—	2.29	.927	5	—	—	—	—	—	3.31	.906
2018–19	EV Zug	NL	36	18	11	—	3	2050	76	5	2.22	.925	14	—	—	—	—	—	2.03	.918
2019–20	Lausanne HC	NL	40	19	10	—	4	2284	82	4	2.15	.924	—	—	—	—	—	—	—	—
2020–21	Lausanne HC	NL	29	14	9	—	2	1719	65	4	2.27	.928	5	—	—	—	—	—	2.45	.922
2021–22	Lausanne HC	NL	29	16	10	—	1	1682	75	0	2.68	.904	—	—	—	—	—	—	—	—
2022–23	Lausanne HC	NL	7	1	5	—	0	309	23	0	4.47	.856	—	—	—	—	—	—	—	—
NHL totals			11	1	3	—	2	499	29	0	3.49	.883	—	—	—	—	—	—	—	—

=== International ===
Year	Team	Event	GP	W	L	T	MIN	GA	SO	GAA	SV%
2001	Switzerland	U18	6	—	—	—	360	16	0	2.67	.927
2002	Switzerland	U18	8	—	—	—	440	20	2	2.72	.894
2002	Switzerland	WJC	6	3	3	0	358	20	1	3.35	.898
2003	Switzerland	WJC	4	2	2	0	240	14	0	3.50	.861
2010	Switzerland	WC	2	1	1	0	120	6	0	3.00	.895
2011	Switzerland	WC	4	3	1	0	241	7	1	1.74	.937
2012	Switzerland	WC	3	1	2	0	177	9	0	3.06	.870
Senior totals			9	5	4	0	538	22	1	2.45	.907
