= Benjamin Conz =

Swiss professional ice hockey goaltender

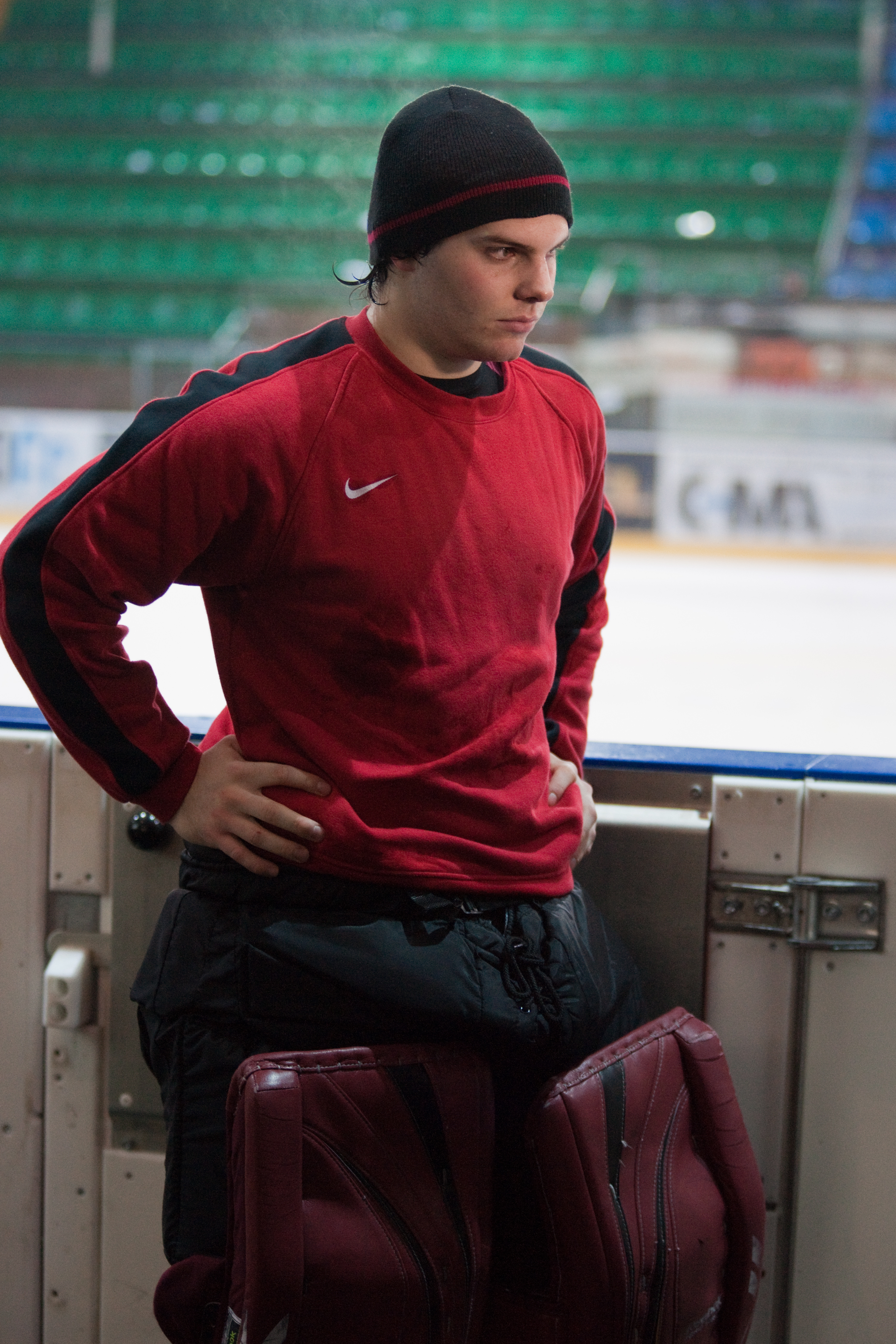
- Born: September 13, 1991 (age 34) Saint-Ursanne, Switzerland
- Height: 5 ft 10 in (178 cm)
- Weight: 205 lb (93 kg; 14 st 9 lb)
- Position: Goaltender
- Catches: Right
- NL team Former teams: HC Ajoie; Genève-Servette HC; SCL Tigers; HC Lugano; HC Fribourg-Gottéron; HC Ambrì-Piotta
- NHL draft: Undrafted
- Playing career: 2008–present

Benjamin Conz (born September 13, 1991) is a Swiss professional ice hockey goaltender who currently plays for HC Ajoie of the National League (NL). He was eligible for the 2009 NHL entry draft and 2010 NHL entry draft, but went undrafted, being drafted 185th overall in the 2010 KHL Junior Draft by SKA St. Petersburg instead.

== Playing career ==
Benjamin started his career in the 2007–08 with the Swiss U20 team, which competed in the Swiss League (SL). After moderate showing in the SL, he signed his first professional contract with Genève-Servette HC of the National League (NL). He posted a 2.50 GAA in 21 games played with Servette. For the 2009–2010 season, he was on loan to the SCL Tigers, also in the NL, located in Langnau im Emmental. He was ranked as the fourth best international goaltender by the NHL Central Scouting Bureau in 2010, and entered into the 2010 NHL Entry Draft but he still went undrafted. TSN's hockey analysts Pierre McGuire and Gord Miller both compared Conz favourably to Conn Smythe winner and Stanley Cup champion Jean-Sébastien Giguère.

On June 21, 2017, Conz was shipped to HC Ambrì-Piotta despite one year remaining on his contract with Fribourg. He was signed to a one-year contract by Ambri with an option for a second year. Ambri-Piotta exercised his option on February 1, 2018.

On November 11, 2018, Conz was signed to an early two-year contract extension by Ambri-Piotta through the 2020/21 season. With a nagging hip injury following the 2018-19 season, Conz had to undergo surgery on May 20, 2019. He was sidelined for 5 months and returned to game action on October 27, 2019 on a rehab assignment with the HCB Ticino Rockets of the Swiss League. He eventually returned to play with Ambri-Piotta but sustained an adductor injury on December 8, 2019, forcing him to sit out a month of competition, including the 2019 Spengler Cup in which Ambri-Piotta was invited.

== International play ==
At the 2010 IIHF World U20 Championships, Conz led the Swiss team to impressive fourth place finish. He managed an upset of the Slovaks by stopping 39 shots in a 4–1 victory. This victory advanced Switzerland to the knockout round to face the highly favoured Russian squad. Against the Russian, Conz had another impressive match where he made 50 saves on 52 shots, as the Swiss advanced 3–2. After losing to the Canadians 6–1 and Swedes 11–4 and out of the medals, Conz finished the tournament with a 4.76 GAA and an 89.31% save percentage, an impressive feat due to the workload the over-matched Swiss defence allowed on Conz. He faced more than 300 shots on goal, making him the tournament's busiest goalie, and his 284 saves in seven games were tournament best. Despite allowing the second most goals in the tournament at 34, he was selected to the tournament all-star team and named the best goaltender.

== Career statistics ==
As of the end of the 2023–24 season.

=== Regular season and playoffs ===
			Regular season									Playoffs
Season	Team	League	GP	W	L	T	MIN	GA	SO	GAA	SV%	GP	W	L	T	MIN	GA	SO	GAA	SV%
2007–08	Switzerland U20	NLB	4	0	2	0	179	15	0	5.06	—	—	—	—	—	—	—	—	—	—
2008–09	Genève-Servette HC	NLA	21	10	9	1	1234	52	2	2.53	-	3	0	3	0	140	10	0	4.29	—
2008–09	Switzerland U20	NLB	1	0	1	0	60	7	0	7.00	—	—	—	—	—	—	—	—	—	—
2009–10	SCL Tigers	NLA	23	9	13	1	1339	73	2	3.27	—	8	6	2	0	481	27	0	3.37	—
2009–10	Lausanne HC	NLB	3	0	3	0	180	14	0	4.67	—	2	0	1	0	79	5	0	3.81	—
2010–11	SCL Tigers	NLA	46	20	19	7	2797	139	5	2.98	.906	4	0	3	1	245	14	0	3.43	—
2011–12	HC Lugano	NLA	50	26	18	6	2987	136	6	2.73	.907	6	2	3	0	310	19	0	3.68	.886
2012–13	Fribourg-Gottéron	NLA	48	33	10	5	2922	109	5	2.24	.929	18	10	6	2	1123	44	1	2.35	.912
2013–14	Fribourg-Gottéron	NLA	48	28	16	3	2850	124	3	2.61	.916	10	6	3	1	599	24	1	2.41	.918
2014–15	Fribourg-Gottéron	NLA	41	15	19	6	2324	129	1	3.33	.891	5	3	1	1	272	7	0	1.55	.939
2015–16	Fribourg-Gottéron	NLA	48	24	20	4	2837	132	4	2.79	.907	5	1	3	1	312	14	1	2.69	.911
2016–17	Fribourg-Gottéron	NLA	45	14	27	2	2603	137	2	3.16	.891	9	7	2	0	501	10	3	1.20	.959
2017–18	HC Ambrì-Piotta	NL	45	17	23	0	2559	135	2	3.17	.899	10	—	—	—	—	—	—	3.01	.915
2018–19	HC Ambrì-Piotta	NL	41	19	14	2	2260	91	4	2.42	.918	5	1	4	0	293	12	0	2.46	.923
2019–20	HC Ambrì-Piotta	NL	19	6	7	2	1001	38	2	2.28	.917	—	—	—	—	—	—	—	—	—
2019–20	HCB Ticino Rockets	SL	3	1	1	1	184	8	0	2.62	.930	—	—	—	—	—	—	—	—	—
2020–21	HC Ambrì-Piotta	NL	16	3	9	1	856	37	0	2.59	.917	—	—	—	—	—	—	—	—	—
2020–21	HCB Ticino Rockets	SL	3	2	0	0	174	3	1	1.04	.965	—	—	—	—	—	—	—	—	—
2021–22	HC Ambrì-Piotta	NL	26	11	10	1	1415	61	2	2.59	.917	—	—	—	—	—	—	—	—	—
2022–23	HC Ambrì-Piotta	NL	21	8	8	1	1151	62	0	3.23	.894	—	—	—	—	—	—	—	—	—
2023–24	HC Ambrì-Piotta	NL	15	7	6	0	713	28	2	2.36	.920	1	0	0	1	60	1	0	1.00	.970
2024–25	HC Ajoie	NL	32	7	21	3	1761	98	3	3.34	.901	—	—	—	—	—	—	—	—	—
NL totals			585	257	249	45	33,602	1581	45	2.82	.908	84	36	30	7	4332	182	6	2.52	.921

=== International ===
As of the end of the 2009–10 season.

Year	Team	Comp	Result	GP	W	L	T	MIN	GA	SO	GAA	Sv%
2008	Switzerland	U18	8th	4	2	2	0	240	13	0	3.25	85.56
2009	Switzerland	U18	8th	6	2	4	0	327	27	0	4.95	87.50
2010	Switzerland	WJC	4th	7	3	4	0	428	34	0	4.76	89.31
2011	Switzerland	WJC	5th	6	2	3	0	364	18	0	2.97	91.80

== Awards ==
- 2010 IIHF World Juniors all-star team.
- IIHF Best goaltender Award - 2010 World Juniors.
- Spengler Cup Champion - 2022 (HC Ambrì-Piotta)
