= Trevor Meier =

Canadian-Swiss ice hockey player

- Born: July 7, 1973 (age 52) Oakville, Ontario, Canada
- Height: 5 ft 9 in (175 cm)
- Weight: 182 lb (83 kg; 13 st 0 lb)
- Position: Left wing
- Shot: Left
- Played for: SC Herisau; SC Bern; HC Lugano; Lausanne HC; SC Langnau; EHC Visp; EV Zug; HC Ambrì-Piotta
- Playing career: 1992–2012

Trevor Meier (born July 7, 1973) is a retired ice hockey left winger. He has dual-citizenship with Canada and Switzerland.

Trevor was born in Oakville, Ontario, Canada. He grew up in Burlington, Ontario, Canada playing for the local rep hockey system until he decided to play hockey for Nelson High School at the age of 16. In the summer of 1992 he had an open "free-skate" tryout with the coach of Herisau SC in Switzerland who, impressed with his skill, invited him over to play in the Swiss B league. After a successful first year in Herisau, he signed with SC Bern in 1993 and competed in the Swiss Nationalliga A for the rest of his career. He played for SC Bern (NLA Champion 1997, 2010), HC Lugano (NLA Champion 1999), SC Lausanne, SC Langnau, EV Zug, and HC Ambri-Piotta.
