= Lukas Flüeler =

Swiss ice hockey player

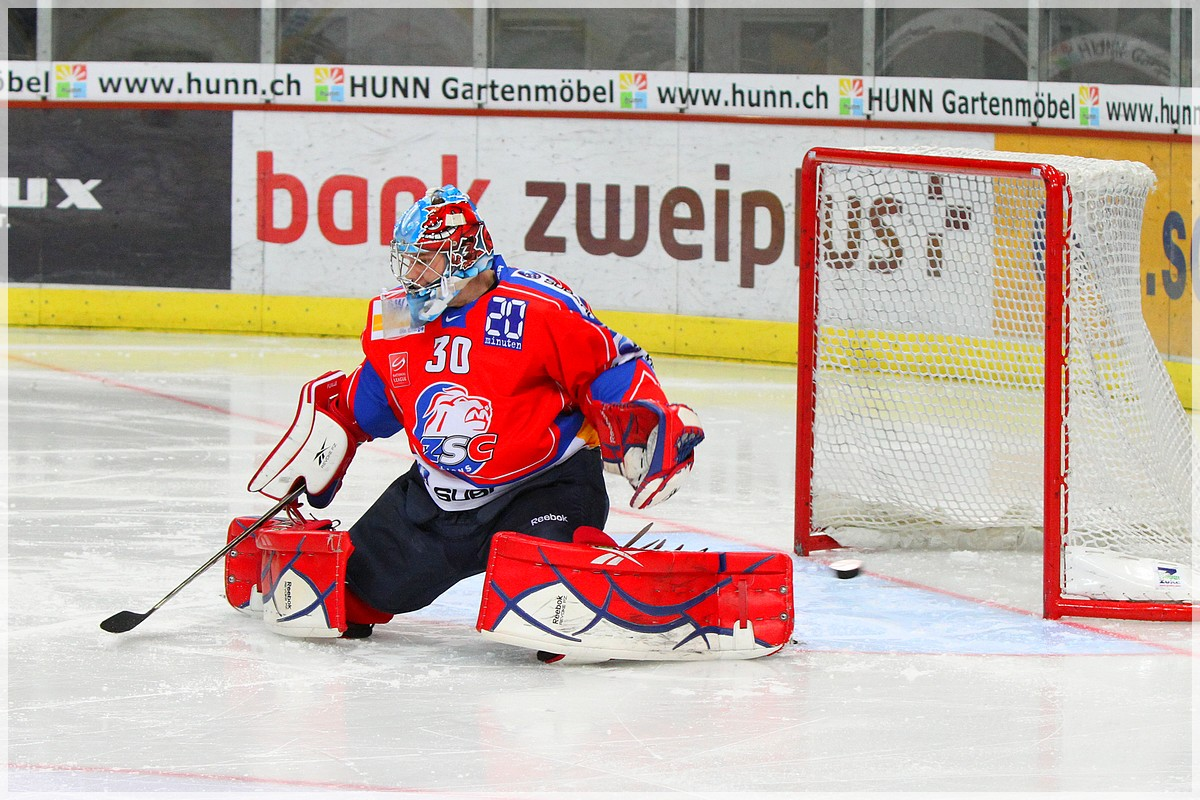
- Born: October 22, 1988 (age 36); Kloten, Switzerland
- Height: 6 ft 4 in (193 cm)
- Weight: 209 lb (95 kg; 14 st 13 lb)
- Position: Goaltender
- Caught: Left
- Played for: ZSC Lions
- National team: Switzerland
- NHL draft: Undrafted
- Playing career: 2005–2022

Lukas Flüeler (born October 22, 1988) is a Swiss former professional ice hockey Goaltender who played the entirety of top flight professional career with ZSC Lions of the National League (NL). Flüeler competed in the 2012 IIHF World Championship as a member of the Switzerland men's national ice hockey team.
