= Eisstadion Biel =

Former ice hockey arena in Bienne, Switzerland

Coordinates: 47.152944°N 7.275139°E

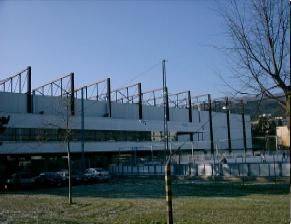
- Location: Bienne, Switzerland
- Owner: Stadt Biel/Bienne
- Capacity: 7,000

Construction
- Opened: 1973
- Closed: March 12, 2015
- Demolished: Spring to Summer of 2015

Tenants
- EHC Biel (since 1973)

Eisstadion Biel was an arena in Bienne, Switzerland, primarily used for ice hockey. It is the home of EHC Biel from 1973 to 2015.

The stadium had a capacity of 8,200 people in 2010. The stadium suffered considerable structural damage in its final years, including its roof. In 2015, EHC Biel moved to Stades de Bienne.

Photos of the demolition
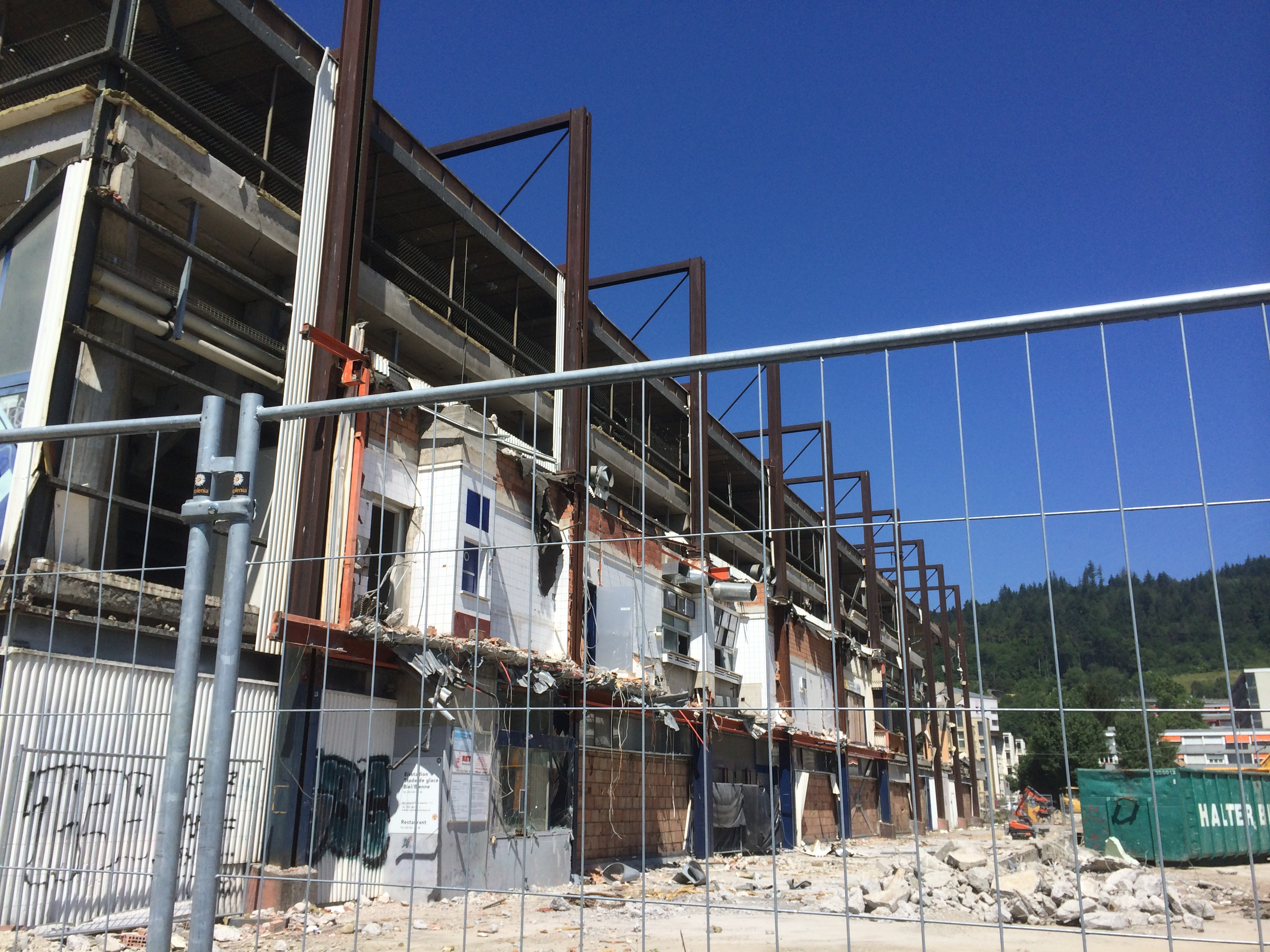
Abbruch Restaurant Seite

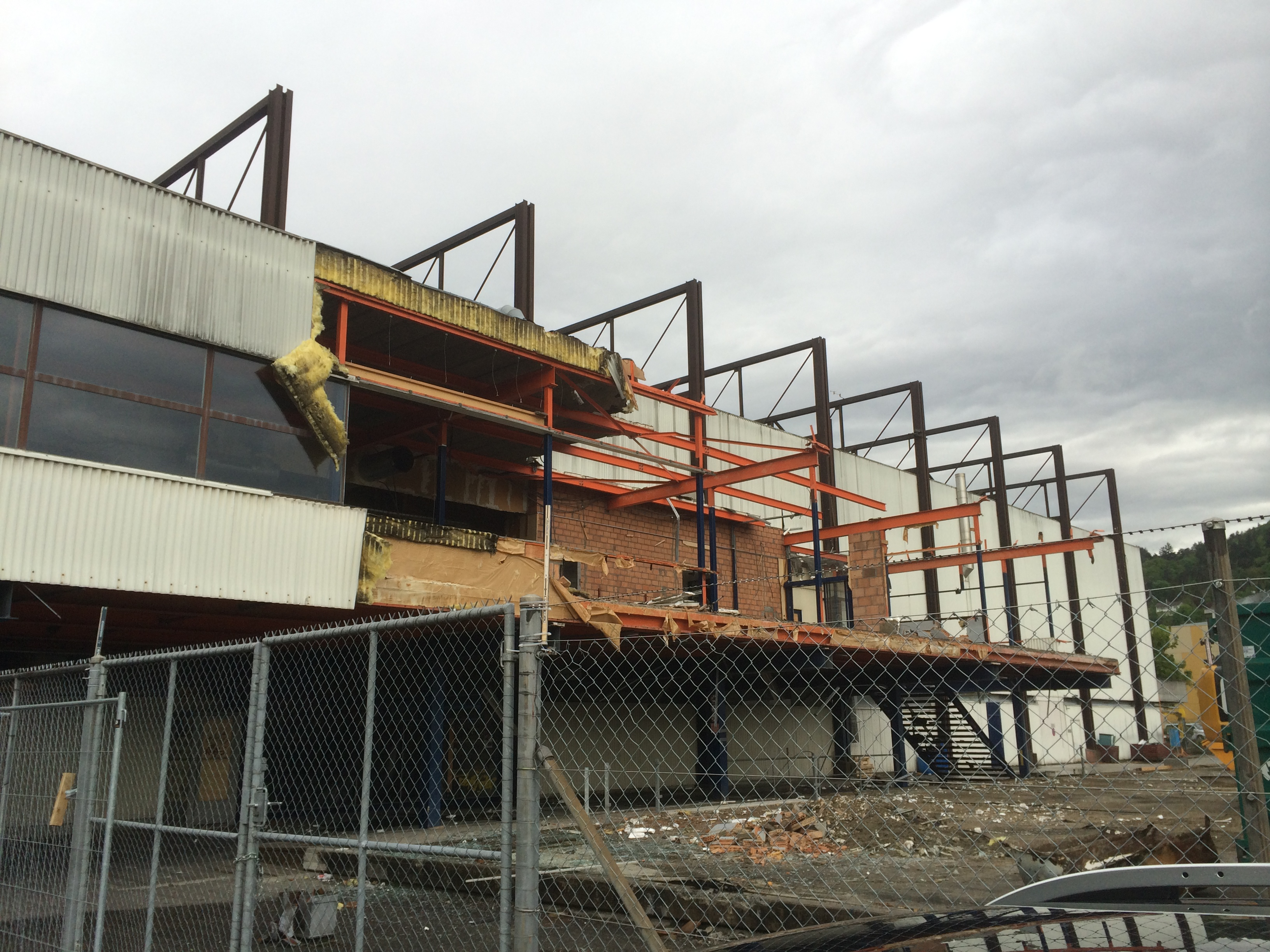
Abbruch alte Eishalle (restaurant)

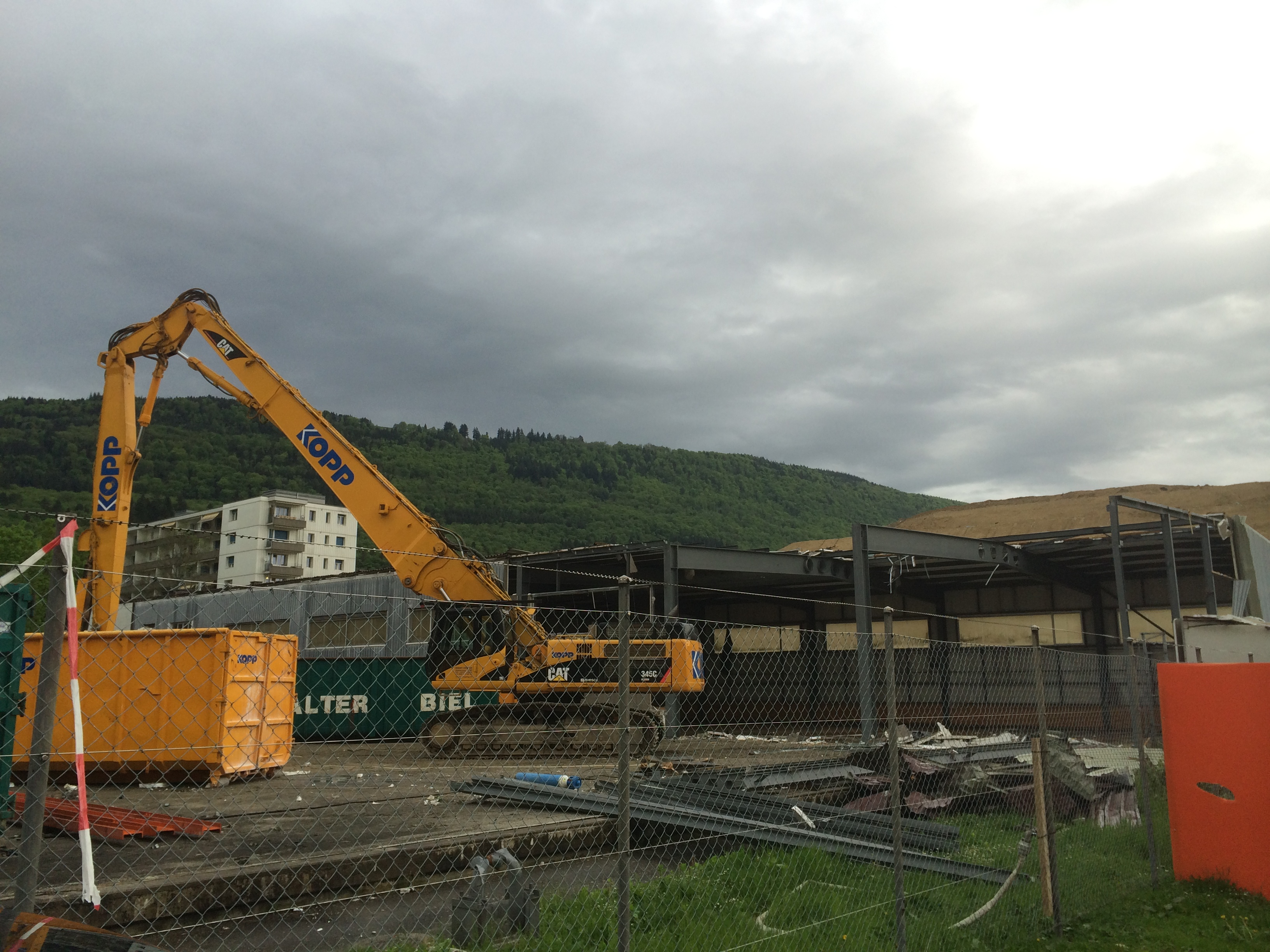
Abbruch alte Curlinghalle

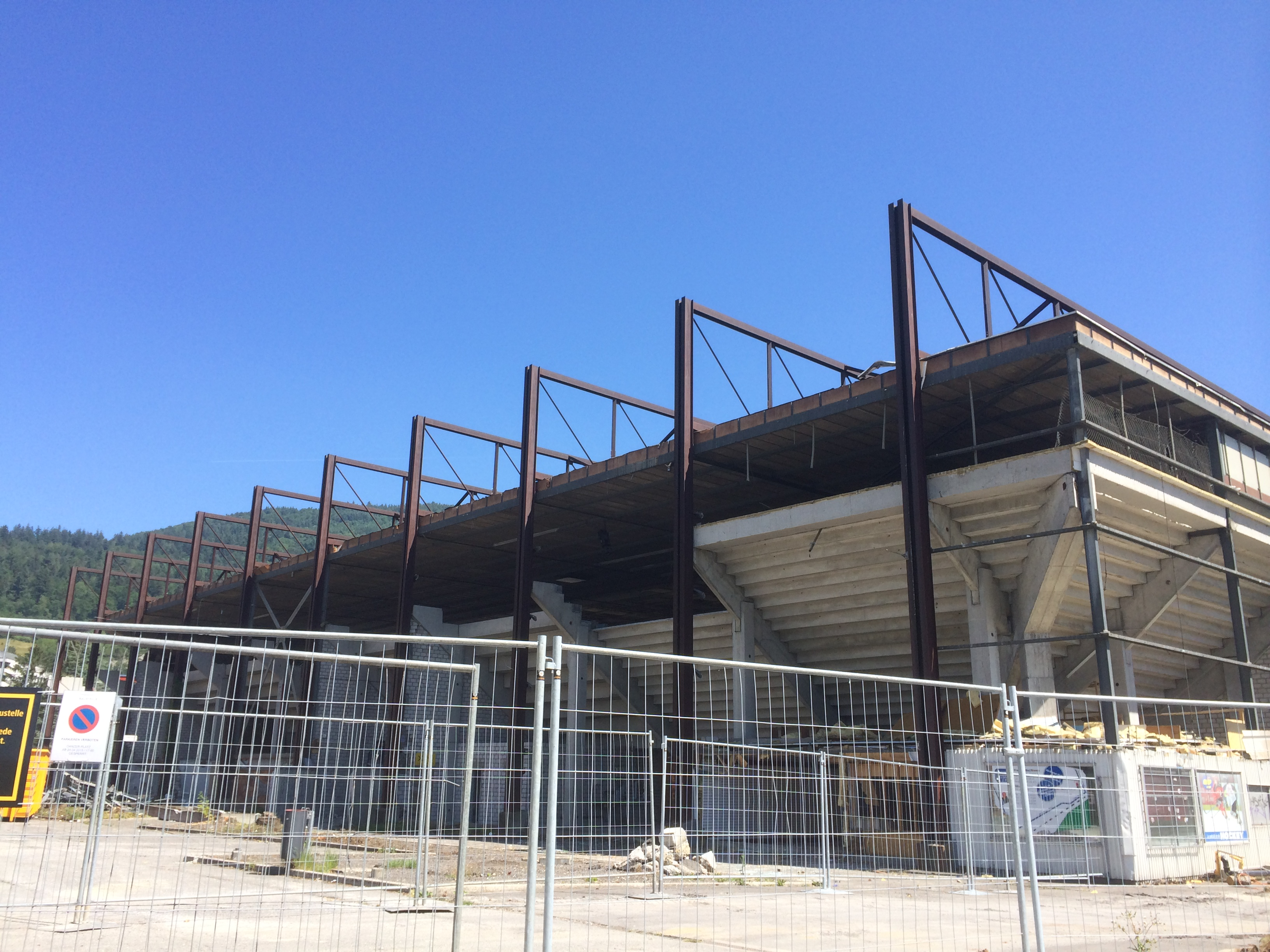
Abbruch Westseite

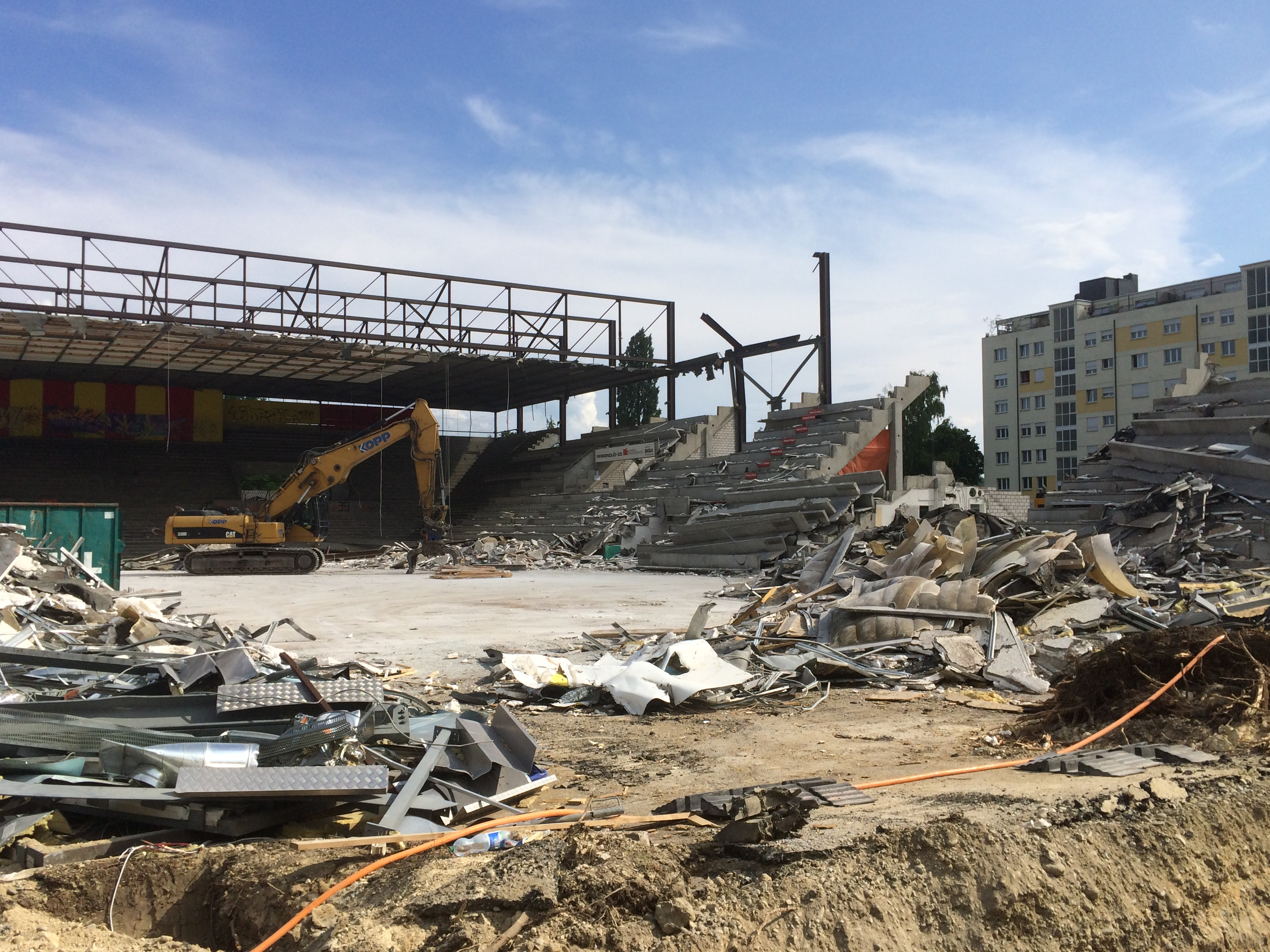
Abbruch Nordseite
