= Daniel Manzato =

Swiss ice hockey player (born 1984)

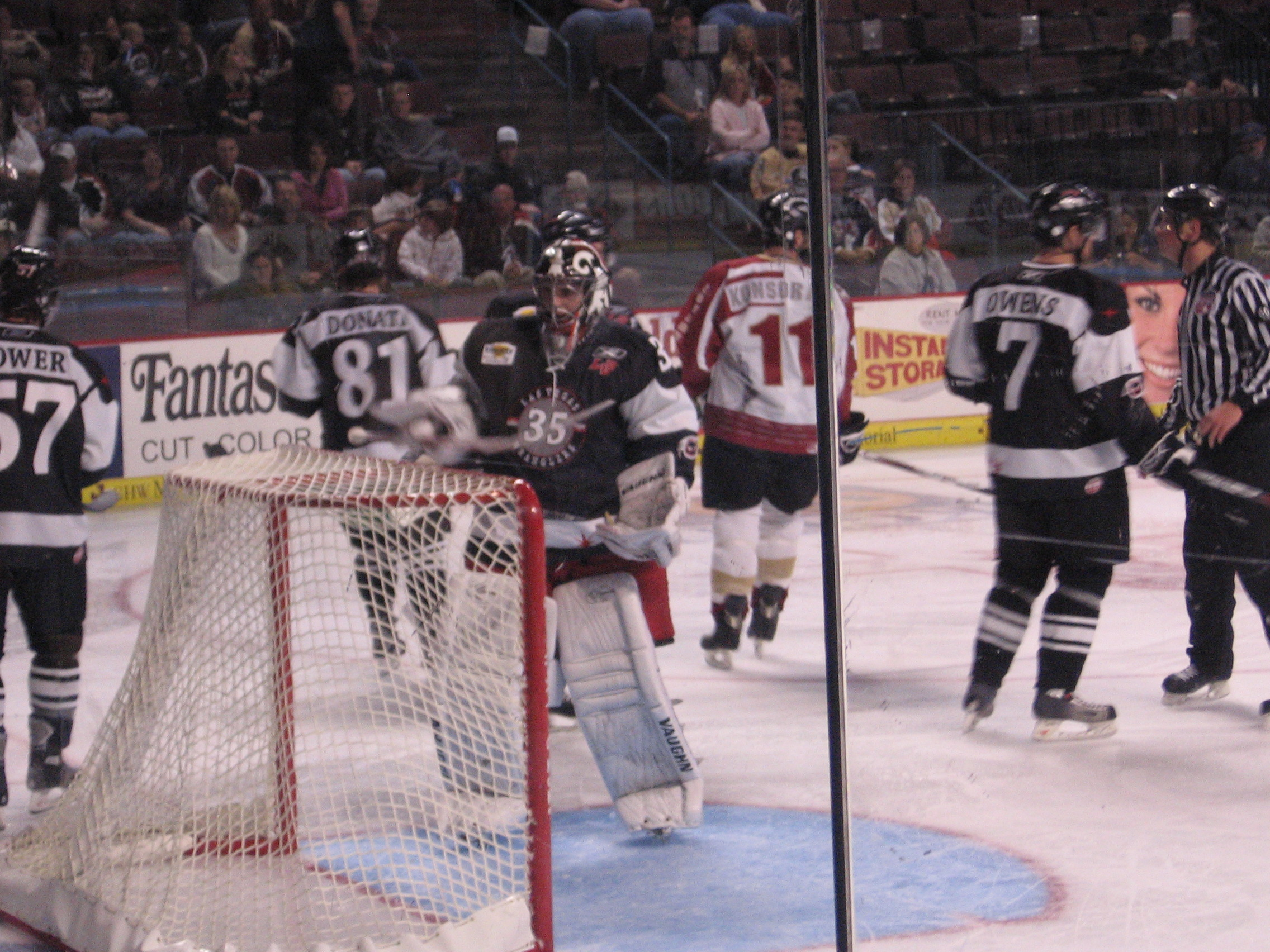
- Born: 17 January 1984 (age 42) Fribourg, Switzerland
- Height: 6 ft 0 in (183 cm)
- Weight: 181 lb (82 kg; 12 st 13 lb)
- Position: Goaltender
- Shoots: Left
- NL team Former teams: SC Bern; EHC Kloten; EHC Basel; Albany River Rats; Rapperswil-Jona Lakers; HC Lugano; HC Ambrì-Piotta; Genève-Servette HC
- National team: Switzerland
- NHL draft: 160th overall, 2002; Carolina Hurricanes
- Playing career: 2004–present

Daniel Manzato (born 17 January 1984) is a Swiss professional ice hockey goaltender who currently plays for SC Bern in the National League (NL). He was drafted 160th overall in the 2002 NHL entry draft by the Carolina Hurricanes.

== Playing career ==
During the 2014–15 season, on 5 January 2015, Manzato signed a three-year contract extension to remain in Lugano until 2018.

Manzato joined HC Ambrì-Piotta for the 2018/19 season on a two-year deal.

On 12 December 2019, in the final year of his contract with Ambri, Manzato agreed to a one-year deal with Genève-Servette HC for the 2020/21 season.

On 11 March 2021, Manzato agreed to a one-year deal with SC Bern for the 2021/22 season.

== International play ==
Manzato participated at the 2010 IIHF World Championship as a member of the Switzerland men's national ice hockey team.

== Personal life ==
Born and raised in the French-speaking part of Switzerland, he speaks German as well as Italian, being of Italian descent and having lived for about six years in the Italian-speaking Canton of Ticino.
