= Marco Bührer =

Swiss ice hockey player

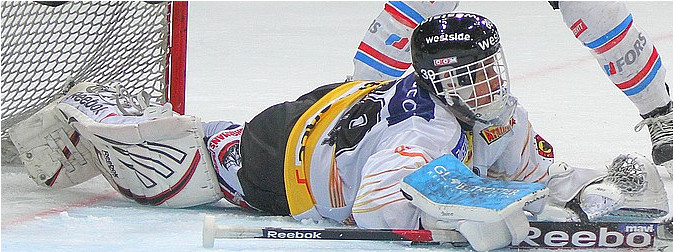
- Born: 9 October 1979 (age 46) Dielsdorf, Switzerland
- Height: 6 ft 0 in (183 cm)
- Weight: 185 lb (84 kg; 13 st 3 lb)
- Position: Goaltender
- Caught: Left
- Played for: EHC Kloten; EHC Chur; SC Bern
- National team: Switzerland
- Playing career: 1996–2016

Marco Bührer (born 9 October 1979 in Dielsdorf, Switzerland) is a Swiss former professional ice hockey player. He played as goaltender and spent most of his career with SC Bern of the National League A.

Bührer was awarded the Jacques Plante Trophy as the league's best goaltender of the 2003–04 season.
