= 2009–10 NLA season =

2009–10 National League A season
- League: National League A
- Sport: Ice hockey
- Duration: September 11, 2009 – March 6, 2010
- Number of games: 50
- Number of teams: 12
- TV partner(s): SRG SSR idée suisse, Teleclub

Regular season
- Best record: Bern
- Runners-up: Genève-Servette
- Top scorer: Randy Robitaille (HC Lugano)

Playoffs
- Semi-Finals #1 champions: SC Bern
- Semi-Finals #1 runners-up: Kloten Flyers
- Semi-Finals #2 champions: Genève-Servette HC
- Semi-Finals #2 runners-up: EV Zug

National League A Championship
- Champions: SC Bern
- Runners-up: Genève-Servette HC

National League A seasons
- ← 2008–09 2010–11 →

The 2009–10 National League A season was the third ice hockey season of the National League A since the reorganization of the Swiss league. Prior to the season, no promotion and relegation occurred between the National League A and National League B as a result of NLA club Biel's victory over Lausanne in the prior season's relegation playoff.

== Format ==
The regular season schedule consists of a double round-robin, each of the league's twelve teams playing the other eleven four times apiece, twice at home and twice on the road. Each team plays an additional six games against three opponents, which are schedules based upon the previous season's standings. At the conclusion of the regular season, the top eight teams are entered into the playoffs; the bottom four enter a relegation playoff, commonly called the playout. Each playoff and playout series is contested in a best-of-seven fashion. The loser of the playout plays a best-of-seven series against the National League B champion for a place in the 2010–11 National League A.

== Team overview ==
Location of the 2009–10 National League A teams

Team	City	Arena	Capacity
HC Ambrì-Piotta	Quinto	Valascia	7,000
SC Bern	Bern	PostFinance Arena	17,131
EHC Biel	Biel	Eisstadion Biel	7,000
HC Davos	Davos	Vaillant Arena	7,080
HC Fribourg-Gottéron	Fribourg	Patinoire Saint-Léonard	7,125
Genève-Servette	Geneva	Patinoire des Vernets	6,837
Kloten Flyers	Kloten	Kolping Arena	7,624
HC Lugano	Lugano	Resega	8,000
Rapperswil-Jona Lakers	Rapperswil	Diners Club Arena	6,000
SCL Tigers	Langnau	Ilfis Stadium	6,500
ZSC Lions	Zürich	Hallenstadion	11,700
EV Zug	Zug	Eishalle Herti	6,780

== Regular season ==
=== Standings ===
Team	GP	W	OTW	OTL	L	GF	GA	P
SC Bern	50	29	5	5	11	154	117	102
Genève-Servette	50	28	6	5	11	166	113	101
EV Zug	50	29	4	3	14	165	125	98
HC Davos	50	27	6	3	14	181	124	96
Kloten Flyers	50	22	9	3	16	163	138	87
ZSC Lions	50	24	3	6	17	185	165	84
HC Fribourg-Gottéron	50	18	4	6	22	145	160	68
HC Lugano	50	17	6	4	23	153	166	67
EHC Biel	50	16	3	5	26	134	182	59
Rapperswil-Jona Lakers	50	16	2	2	30	129	154	54
SCL Tigers	50	14	2	5	29	141	192	51
HC Ambrì-Piotta	50	8	2	5	35	107	187	33

=== League leaders ===
==== Scoring ====
Name	Team	GO	G	A	P	PIM	PPT?
(Canada) Randy Robitaille	HC Lugano	50	16	48	64	72	4
(Canada) Josh Holden	EV Zug	46	30	33	63	48	10
(Switzerland) Hnat Domenichelli	HC Lugano	50	27	35	62	16	13
(Switzerland) Damien Brunner	EV Zug	47	23	34	57	22	7
(Switzerland) Patrik Bärtschi	ZSC Lions	49	25	28	53	34	6
(Finland) Tony Salmelainen	Genève-Servette	50	26	26	52	14	2
(Canada) Stacy Roest	Rapperswil-Jona Lakers	49	15	37	52	26	5
(Switzerland) Mathias Seger	ZSC Lions	47	8	43	51	80	2
(Switzerland) Thomas Déruns	Genève-Servette	50	18	32	50	44	4
(Slovakia) Juraj Kolník	Genève-Servette	46	26	22	48	83	5

==== Goaltenders ====
Name	Team	G	Min	GT	GAA	Min/GT	SO	S	W
(Switzerland) Tobias Stephan	Genève-Servette	48	2914	100	2.1	29	3	34	14
(Switzerland) Marco Bührer	Bern	43	2609	94	2.2	28	6	28	14
(Switzerland) Leonardo Genoni	Davos	46	2937	117	2.4	25	2	33	16
(Finland) Jussi Markkanen	Zug	44	2653	109	2.5	24	5	27	17
(Switzerland) Ronnie Rüeger	Kloten Flyers	46	2805	122	2.6	23	1	28	18
(Switzerland) Daniel Manzato	Rapperswil-Jona Lakers	46	2715	132	2.9	21	5	17	29
(Finland) Ari Sulander	Lions	24	1451	69	2.9	21	1	12	12
(Switzerland) David Aebischer	Lugano	46	2751	139	3.0	20	2	23	22
(Canada) Sébastien Caron	HC Fribourg-Gottéron	45	2689	135	3.0	20	1	19	26
(Switzerland) Reto Berra	Biel	37	2116	114	3.2	19	3	16	19

== Playoffs ==
Quarterfinalz
1.	SC Bern	4
8.	HC Lugano	0
4.	HC Davos	2
5.	Kloten Flyers	4
2.	HC Servette Genève	4
7.	HC Fribourg-Gottéron	3
3.	EV Zug	4
6.	ZSC Lions	3

Semifinals
1.	SC Bern	4
5.	Kloten Flyers	0
2.	HC Servette Genève	4
3.	EV Zug	2

Final
1.	SC Bern	4
2.	HC Servette Genève	3
