= 2001–02 Nationalliga A season =

Swiss professional ice hockey season

The 2001–02 NLA season was the 64th regular season of the Nationalliga A, the main professional ice hockey league in Switzerland.

== Regular season ==
=== Final standings ===
| | Team | GP | W | L | T | GF | GA | Pts |
|---|---|---|---|---|---|---|---|---|
| 1. | HC Davos | 44 | 28 | 12 | 4 | 140 | 97 | 60 |
| 2. | HC Lugano | 44 | 25 | 14 | 5 | 149 | 121 | 55 |
| 3. | HC Fribourg-Gottéron | 44 | 21 | 16 | 7 | 142 | 138 | 49 |
| 4. | HC Ambri-Piotta | 44 | 19 | 16 | 9 | 121 | 112 | 47 |
| 5. | ZSC Lions | 44 | 21 | 18 | 5 | 130 | 124 | 47 |
| 6. | Kloten Flyers | 44 | 19 | 17 | 8 | 142 | 129 | 46 |
| 7. | EV Zug | 44 | 18 | 18 | 8 | 119 | 127 | 44 |
| 8. | SC Bern | 44 | 18 | 20 | 6 | 124 | 111 | 42 |
| 9. | HC Lausanne | 44 | 18 | 22 | 4 | 128 | 145 | 40 |
| 10. | SCL Tigers | 44 | 16 | 21 | 7 | 109 | 127 | 39 |
| 11. | SC Rapperswil-Jona | 44 | 15 | 23 | 6 | 124 | 139 | 36 |
| 12. | EHC Chur | 44 | 9 | 30 | 5 | 105 | 163 | 23 |

=== Scoring leaders ===
Note: GP = Games played; G = Goals; A = Assists; Pts = Points; PIM = Penalty Minutes

| Player | Team | GP | G | A | Pts | PIM |
|---|---|---|---|---|---|---|
| Christian Dubé | HC Lugano | 38 | 22 | 37 | 59 | 22 |
| Martin Plüss | EHC Kloten | 44 | 23 | 32 | 55 | 30 |
| Kimmo Rintanen | EHC Kloten | 44 | 18 | 36 | 54 | 24 |
| Todd Elik | EV Zug | 41 | 17 | 37 | 54 | 104 |
| Patrik Juhlin | SC Bern | 44 | 27 | 26 | 53 | 24 |
| Mike Maneluk | HC Lugano | 43 | 21 | 32 | 53 | 90 |
| Derek Armstrong | SC Bern | 44 | 17 | 36 | 53 | 60 |
| Robert Petrovicky | HC Ambri-Piotta | 38 | 23 | 23 | 46 | 34 |
| Lonny Bohonos | HC Davos | 43 | 20 | 26 | 46 | 22 |
| Adrian Wichser | HC Lugano | 41 | 18 | 27 | 45 | 12 |

== Playoffs ==
=== Quarterfinals ===
HC Davos (1) vs. SC Bern (8)
| Away | Home | |
|---|---|---|
| SC Bern 4 | 5 HC Davos | |
| HC Davos 4 | 5 SC Bern | OT |
| SC Bern 4 | 1 HC Davos | |
| HC Davos 5 | 4 SC Bern | |
| SC Bern 1 | 3 HC Davos | |
| HC Davos 4 | 2 SC Bern | |
HC Davos wins series 4–2

Fribourg-Gottéron (3) vs. Kloten Flyers (6)
| Away | Home | |
|---|---|---|
| Kloten Flyers 3 | 0 Fribourg-Gottéron | |
| Fribourg-Gottéron 4 | 3 Kloten Flyers | |
| Kloten Flyers 4 | 2 Fribourg-Gottéron | |
| Fribourg-Gottéron 2 | 3 Kloten Flyers | OT |
| Kloten Flyers 4 | 1 Fribourg-Gottéron | |
Kloten Flyers wins series 4–1

HC Lugano (2) vs. EV Zug (7)
| Away | Home | |
|---|---|---|
| EV Zug 2 | 6 HC Lugano | |
| HC Lugano 4 | 1 EV Zug | |
| EV Zug 5 | 2 HC Lugano | |
| HC Lugano 8 | 1 EV Zug | |
| EV Zug 2 | 1 HC Lugano | OT |
| HC Lugano 6 | 3 EV Zug | |
HC Lugano wins series 4–2

HC Ambri-Piotta (1) vs. ZSC Lions (8)
| Away | Home | |
|---|---|---|
| ZSC Lions 2 | 1 HC Ambri-Piotta | |
| HC Ambri-Piotta 2 | 3 ZSC Lions | n.P. |
| ZSC Lions 3 | 4 HC Ambri-Piotta | |
| HC Ambri-Piotta 1 | 2 ZSC Lions | OT |
| ZSC Lions 2 | 4 HC Ambri-Piotta | |
| HC Ambri-Piotta 3 | 4 ZSC Lions | OT |
ZSC Lions wins series 4–2

=== Semifinals ===
HC Davos vs. Kloten Flyers
| Away | Home |
|---|---|
| Kloten Flyers 1 | 3 HC Davos |
| HC Davos 2 | 3 Kloten Flyers |
| Kloten Flyers 4 | 6 HC Davos |
| HC Davos 3 | 6 Kloten Flyers |
| Kloten Flyers 2 | 3 HC Davos |
| HC Davos 6 | 0 Kloten Flyers |
HC Davos wins series 4–2

HC Lugano vs. ZSC Lions
| Away | Home | |
|---|---|---|
| ZSC Lions 2 | 4 HC Lugano | |
| HC Lugano 1 | 6 ZSC Lions | |
| ZSC Lions 2 | 3 HC Lugano | OT |
| HC Lugano 1 | 2 ZSC Lions | OT |
| ZSC Lions 0 | 5 HC Lugano | |
| HC Lugano 3 | 4 ZSC Lions | OT |
| ZSC Lions 5 | 4 HC Lugano | |
ZSC Lions wins series 4–3

=== Finals ===
HC Davos vs. ZSC Lions
| Date | Away | Home |
|---|---|---|
| March 30 | ZSC Lions 0 | 3 HC Davos |
| April 1 | HC Davos 6 | 2 ZSC Lions |
| April 4 | ZSC Lions 1 | 3 HC Davos |
| April 6 | HC Davos 4 | 1 ZSC Lions |
HC Davos wins series 4–0

=== Scoring leaders ===
Note: GP = Games played; G = Goals; A = Assists; Pts = Points; PIM = Penalty Minutes

| Player | Team | GP | G | A | Pts | PIM |
|---|---|---|---|---|---|---|
| Lonny Bohonos | HC Davos | 16 | 13 | 8 | 21 | 4 |
| Mike Maneluk | HC Lugano | 12 | 9 | 11 | 20 | 24 |
| Christian Dubé | HC Lugano | 13 | 4 | 13 | 17 | 14 |
| Michel Riesen | HC Davos | 16 | 7 | 8 | 15 | 52 |
| Josef Marha | HC Davos | 16 | 6 | 9 | 15 | 8 |
| Petteri Nummelin | HC Lugano | 13 | 6 | 8 | 14 | 2 |
| Kevin Miller | HC Davos | 16 | 4 | 10 | 14 | 12 |
| Peter Jaks | ZSC Lions | 17 | 6 | 7 | 13 | 10 |
| Régis Fuchs | HC Lugano | 13 | 7 | 5 | 12 | 12 |
| Björn Christen | HC Davos | 14 | 8 | 3 | 11 | 10 |
