= 2004–05 Nationalliga A season =

Swiss professional ice hockey season

The 2004–05 NLA season was the 67th regular season of the Nationalliga A, the main professional ice hockey league in Switzerland.

The season started on September 17, 2004, the last League Qualification game was played on April 14, 2005.

== Regular season ==
=== Final standings ===
	Team	GP	W	L	T	GF	GA	Pts
1.	HC Lugano	44	29	8	7	148	99	65
2.	HC Davos	44	27	13	4	156	102	58
3.	ZSC Lions	44	23	17	4	146	118	50
4.	EV Zug	44	20	16	8	140	142	48
5.	Genève-Servette HC	44	20	19	5	126	131	45
6.	HC Ambri-Piotta	44	19	18	7	133	137	45
7.	SC Rapperswil-Jona	44	20	19	5	140	130	45
8.	SC Bern	44	18	18	8	143	121	44
9.	Kloten Flyers	44	19	20	5	122	128	43
10.	HC Fribourg-Gottéron	44	13	24	7	115	145	33
11.	SCL Tigers	44	12	26	6	96	154	30
12.	HC Lausanne	44	8	30	6	111	169	22

=== Scoring leaders ===
Note: GP = Games played; G = Goals; A = Assists; Pts = Points; PIM = Penalty Minutes

Player	Team	GP	G	A	Pts	PIM
Randy Robitaille	ZSC Lions	36	22	45	67	56
Hnat Domenichelli	HC Ambri-Piotta	41	23	36	59	30
Jean-Guy Trudel	HC Ambri-Piotta	42	24	33	57	105
Ville Peltonen	HC Lugano	44	24	32	56	16
Stacy Roest	SC Rapperswil-Jona	41	17	38	55	10
Joe Thornton	HC Davos	40	10	44	54	80
Oleg Petrov	EV Zug	44	30	23	53	85
Dale McTavish	SC Rapperswil-Jona	44	24	29	53	36
Robert Petrovicky	ZSC Lions	44	21	29	50	48
Kimmo Rintanen	Kloten Flyers	44	21	29	50	12

== Playoffs ==
=== Quarterfinals ===
HC Lugano (1) vs. SC Bern (8)
Date	Away	Home	
February 26	SC Bern 2	0 HC Lugano	
March 1	HC Lugano 5	2 SC Bern	
March 3	SC Bern 2	0 HC Lugano	
March 5	HC Lugano 2	4 SC Bern	
March 7	SC Bern 5	4 HC Lugano	OT
SC Bern wins series 4–1

ZSC Lions (3) vs. HC-Ambri-Piotta (6)
Date	Away	Home
February 26	HC-Ambri-Piotta 3	5 ZSC Lions
March 1	ZSC Lions 4	2 HC-Ambri-Piotta
March 3	HC-Ambri-Piotta 2	1 ZSC Lions
March 5	ZSC Lions 2	1 HC-Ambri-Piotta
March 7	HC-Ambri-Piotta 2	6 ZSC Lions
ZSC Lions wins series 4–1

HC Davos (2) vs. SC Rapperswil-Jona (7)
Date	Away	Home	
February 26	SC Rapperswil-Jona 2	6 HC Davos	
March 1	HC Davos 2	1 SC Rapperswil-Jona	OT
March 3	SC Rapperswil-Jona 3	6 HC Davos	
March 5	HC Davos 2	1 SC Rapperswil-Jona	OT
HC Davos wins series 4–0

EV Zug (4) vs. Genève-Servette HC (5)
Date	Away	Home	
February 26	Genève-Servette HC 2	3 EV Zug	
March 1	EV Zug 4	2 Genève-Servette HC	
March 3	Genève-Servette HC 1	3 EV Zug	
March 5	EV Zug 3	2 Genève-Servette HC	OT
EV Zug wins series 4–0

=== Semifinals ===
HC Davos vs. SC Bern
Date	Away	Home
March 12	SC Bern 1	2 HC Davos
March 15	HC Davos 4	5 SC Bern
March 17	SC Bern 1	2 HC Davos
March 19	HC Davos 2	1 SC Bern
March 22	SC Bern 2	0 HC Davos
March 24	HC Davos 4	1 SC Bern
HC Davos wins series 4–2

ZSC Lions vs. EV Zug
Date	Away	Home	
March 12	'EV Zug 3	1 ZSC Lions	
March 15	ZSC Lions 4	1 EV Zug	
March 17	EV Zug 1	4 ZSC Lions	
March 19	ZSC Lions 3	2 EV Zug	OT
March 22	EV Zug 2	4 ZSC Lions	
ZSC Lions wins series 4–1

=== Finals ===
HC Davos vs. ZSC Lions
Date	Away	Home
March 31	ZSC Lions 6	4 HC Davos
April 2	HC Davos 6	3 ZSC Lions
April 4	ZSC Lions 2	3 HC Davos
April 7	HC Davos 4	3 ZSC Lions
April 9	ZSC Lions 2	3 HC Davos
HC Davos wins series 4–1

=== Scoring leaders ===
Note: GP = Games played; G = Goals; A = Assists; Pts = Points; PIM = Penalty Minutes

Player	Team	GP	G	A	Pts	PIM
(Canada) Joe Thornton	HC Davos	14	4	21	25	29
(Canada) Jan Alston	ZSC Lions	15	11	13	24	10
(Canada) Randy Robitaille	ZSC Lions	15	2	17	19	10
(Finland) Niklas Hagman	HC Davos	15	10	7	17	6
(Slovakia) Robert Petrovicky	ZSC Lions	15	6	9	15	39
(Switzerland) Mark Streit	ZSC Lions	15	4	11	15	20
(Finland) Tony Virta	ZSC Lions	14	7	6	13	14
(Canada) Rick Nash	HC Davos	15	9	2	11	26
(Czech Republic) Josef Marha	HC Davos	15	2	8	10	14
(Sweden) Björn Christen	HC Davos	15	7	2	9	4

== Playout ==
=== Semifinals ===
Kloten Flyers (9) vs. HC Lausanne (12)
Date	Away	Home	
February 26	HC Lausanne 2	4 Kloten Flyers	
March 1	Kloten Flyers 2	1 HC Lausanne	
March 3	HC Lausanne 4	8 Kloten Flyers	
March 5	Kloten Flyers 2	3 HC Lausanne	OT
March 7	HC Lausanne 1	6 Kloten Flyers	
Kloten Flyers wins series 4–1

Fribourg-Gottéron (10) vs. SCL Tigers (11)
Date	Away	Home
February 26	SCL Tigers 5	7 Fribourg-Gottéron
March 1	Fribourg-Gottéron 2	5 SCL Tigers
March 3	SCL Tigers 2	0 Fribourg-Gottéron
March 5	Fribourg-Gottéron 2	3 SCL Tigers
March 7	SCL Tigers 1	8 Fribourg-Gottéron
March 10	Fribourg-Gottéron 2	5 SCL Tigers
SCL Tigers wins series 4–2

=== Finals ===
HC Lausanne vs. Fribourg-Gottéron
Date	Away	Home
March 15	HC Lausanne 4	5 Fribourg-Gottéron
March 17	Fribourg-Gottéron 7	9 HC Lausanne
March 19	HC Lausanne 3	7 Fribourg-Gottéron
March 22	Fribourg-Gottéron 4	3 HC Lausanne
March 24	HC Lausanne 2	5 Fribourg-Gottéron
Fribourg-Gottéron wins series 4–1

== League Qualification ==
HC Lausanne vs. EHC Basel
Date	Away	Home
March 31	EHC Basel 5	4 HC Lausanne
April 2	HC Lausanne 3	1 EHC Basel
April 4	EHC Basel 3	4 HC Lausanne
April 7	HC Lausanne 1	5 EHC Basel
April 9	EHC Basel 2	0 HC Lausanne
April 11	HC Lausanne 4	2 EHC Basel
April 14	EHC Basel 4	0 HC Lausanne
EHC Basel wins series 4–3

== Results from Puck.ch ==
- Regular Season 2004-2005
- Playoff 2004-2005
- Playout 2004-2005
- League Qualification 2004-2005
