= 2007–08 NLA season =

2007–08 National League A season
- League: National League A
- Sport: Ice hockey
- Games: 50
- Teams: 12

Regular Season
- Best Record: SC Bern
- Runners-up: Genève
- Top scorer: Erik Westrum (Ambri-Piotta)
- Promoted to NLB: EHC Biel
- Relegated to NLB: EHC Basel

Playoffs
- Semi-final champions: HC Genève-Servette
- Semi-final runners-up: HC Fribourg-Gottèron
- Semi-final champions: HC Davos
- Semi-final runners-up: ZSC Lions

National League A Championship
- Champions: ZSC Lions
- Runners-up: HC Genève-Servette

NLA seasons
- ← 2006–07 2008–09 →

The 2007–08 National League A season, was the first ice hockey season of the National League A since the reorganization of the Swiss league and the 70th in the history of Swiss professional hockey. There were some rule changes to the standings and playoff format and the league officially changed its name to National League A.

== Regular season ==
	Team	GP	W	OTW	OTL	L	GF	GA	Pts
1.	SC Bern	50	33	4	4	9	167	92	111
2.	Genève-Servette HC	50	21	11	4	14	172	135	89
3.	Kloten Flyers	50	26	1	7	16	147	131	87
4.	EV Zug	50	24	5	4	17	174	151	86
5.	HC Davos	50	26	2	2	20	156	124	84
6.	ZSC Lions	50	21	6	6	17	158	125	81
7.	Rapperswil-Jona Lakers	50	23	2	3	22	156	167	76
8.	HC Fribourg-Gottéron	50	17	7	5	21	132	163	70
9.	HC Lugano	50	15	9	6	20	130	149	69
10.	SCL Tigers	50	19	3	5	23	175	195	68
11.	HC Ambrì-Piotta	50	14	7	7	22	160	180	63
12.	EHC Basel	50	3	1	5	41	98	213	16

== Playoffs ==
Quarterfinals
1	SC Bern	2
8	Fribourg	4
2	Genève-Servette HC	4
7	Lakers	1
(Pairings are reseeded after the first round)
3	Kloten Flyers	1
6	ZSC Lions	4
4	EV Zug	3
5	HC Davos	4

Semifinals
2	Genève-Servette HC	4
8	HC Fribourg-Gottéron	1
5	HC Davos	2
6	ZSC Lions	4

Final
2	Genève-Servette HC	2
6	ZSC Lions	4

== Relegation ==
Semifinals
9	HC Lugano	4
12	EHC Basel	1
10	SCL Tigers	4
11	Ambrì-Piotta	2

Final
11	Ambrì-Piotta	4
12	Basel	0

EHC Biel, champions of the National League B, would later defeat EHC Basel Sharks, 4–0 to move up into the National League A. Therefore, Basel was relegated to the National League B.
