= 2006–07 National League A season =

2006–07 National League A Season
- League: National League A
- Sport: Ice hockey
- Games: 44
- Teams: 12

Regular Season
- Best Record: HC Davos
- Runners-up: SC Bern
- Top scorer: Simon Gamache (SC Bern)

Playoffs
- Semi-Final #1 champions: HC Davos
- Semi-Final #1 runners-up: Kloten Flyers
- Semi-Final #2 champions: SC Bern
- Semi-Final #2 runners-up: EV Zug

National League A Championship
- Champions: HC Davos
- Runners-up: SC Bern

NLA seasons
- ← 2005–06 2007–08 →

The 2006–07 NLA season was the 69th regular season of the Nationalliga A (NLA), the main professional ice hockey league in Switzerland.

== New Rules ==
There are a few changes of rules for the new season.

=== 3-Point System ===
For the first time an NLA season is run with a 3-point system. A team gets now 3 points for a win after 60 minutes, instead of 2.

==== Overtime ====
A tied game after 60 minutes results in an overtime of 5 minutes, which is played 4 vs. 4 (this is not a rule change). But now, if a team scores a goal it gets two points while the other team also gets a point.

==== Penalty Shootout ====
If the game still remains tied after the overtime, there will be a penalty shootout with 3 shots per team. The winner team will get two points and the other team one point.

== Regular season ==
=== Final standings ===
	Team	GP	W	L	OTW	OTL	GF	GA	Pts
1.	HC Davos	44	26	13	2	3	154	120	85
2.	SC Bern	44	24	13	5	2	163	115	84
3.	EV Zug	44	22	13	6	3	153	117	81
4.	HC Lugano	44	25	15	1	3	143	123	80
5.	Kloten Flyers	44	22	14	6	2	173	128	80
6.	Rapperswil-Jona Lakers	44	19	17	5	3	149	141	70
7.	Genève-Servette HC	44	19	19	2	4	147	140	65
8.	ZSC Lions	44	13	19	9	3	111	127	60
9.	HC Ambri-Piotta	44	14	21	1	8	128	165	52
10.	HC Fribourg-Gottéron	44	12	19	1	12	134	167	50
11.	SCL Tigers	44	12	26	5	1	115	160	47
12.	EHC Basel	44	9	28	4	3	103	170	38

=== Scoring leaders ===
Note: GP = Games played; G = Goals; A = Assists; Pts = Points; PIM = Penalty Minutes

Player	Team	GP	G	A	Pts	PIM
Simon Gamache	SC Bern	44	20	46	66	40
Alexandre Daigle	HC Davos	44	22	39	61	44
Kimmo Rintanen	Kloten Flyers	41	24	34	58	16
Christian Dubé	SC Bern	40	16	38	54	36
Jean-Guy Trudel	HC Ambri-Piotta	44	27	26	53	38
Hnat Domenichelli	HC Ambri-Piotta	44	21	31	52	50
Oleg Petrov	EV Zug	42	12	40	52	95
Michel Riesen	HC Davos	44	37	14	51	70
Domenico Pittis	Kloten Flyers	40	17	34	51	75
Serge Aubin	Genève-Servette HC	40	21	29	50	50

== Playoffs ==
=== Quarterfinals ===
HC Davos (1) vs. ZSC Lions (8)
Date	Away	Score		Home	
February 24	Lions	3	2	Davos	OT
February 27	Davos	1	3	Lions	
March 1	Lions	1	3	Davos	
March 3	Davos	2	5	Lions	
March 6	Lions	2	4	Davos	
March 8	Davos	3	1	Lions	
March 10	Lions	0	3	Davos	
HC Davos wins series 4–3

EV Zug (3) vs. Rapperswil-Jona Lakers (6)
Date	Away	Score		Home	
February 24	Lakers	3	2	Zug	
February 27	Zug	3	4	Lakers	OT
March 1	Lakers	4	1	Zug	
March 3	Zug	6	5	Lakers	OT
March 6	Lakers	3	6	Zug	
March 8	Zug	5	1	Lakers	
March 10	Lakers	2	6	Zug	
EV Zug wins series 4–3

SC Bern (2) vs. Genève-Servette HC (7)
Date	Away	Score		Home
February 24	Genève	1	2	Bern
February 27	Bern	3	2	Genève
March 1	Genève	2	4	Bern
March 3	Bern	1	2	Genève
March 6	Genève	3	7	Bern
SC Bern wins series 4–1

HC Lugano (4) vs. Kloten Flyers (5)
Date	Away	Score		Home	
February 24	Flyers	6	3	Lugano	
February 27	Lugano	2	3	Flyers	OT
March 1	Flyers	1	8	Lugano	
March 3	Lugano	1	3	Flyers	
March 6	Flyers	3	5	Lugano	
March 8	Lugano	1	3	Flyers	
Kloten Flyers wins series 4–2

=== Semifinals ===
HC Davos (1) vs. Kloten Flyers (5)
Date	Away	Score		Home
March 13	Kloten	0	5	Davos
March 15	Davos	3	4	Kloten
March 17	Kloten	3	4	Davos
March 20	Davos	6	3	Kloten
March 22	Kloten	1	3	Davos
HC Davos wins series 4–1

SC Bern (2) vs. EV Zug (3)
Date	Away	Score		Home
March 13	Zug	0	4	Bern
March 15	Bern	1	0	Zug
March 17	Zug	0	4	Bern
March 20	Bern	1	3	Zug
March 22	Zug	0	4	Bern
SC Bern wins series 4–1

=== Finals ===
HC Davos (1) vs. SC Bern (2)
Date	Away	Score		Home
March 27	Bern	2	3	Davos
March 29	Davos	0	4	Bern
March 31	Bern	1	3	Davos
April 3	Davos	2	3	Bern
April 5	Bern	1	3	Davos
April 7	Davos	1	2	Bern
April 9	Bern	0	1	Davos
HC Davos wins series 4–3

=== Scoring leaders ===
Note: GP = Games played; G = Goals; A = Assists; Pts = Points; PIM = Penalty Minutes

Player	Team	GP	G	A	Pts	PIM
Simon Gamache	SC Bern	15	7	9	16	10
Christian Dubé	SC Bern	16	0	16	16	24
Josef Marha	HC Davos	18	8	6	14	24
Kimmo Rintanen	Kloten Flyers	11	6	7	13	2
Alexandre Daigle	HC Davos	17	4	9	13	4
Zbynek Irgl	HC Davos	15	8	4	12	20
Mariusz Czerkawski	Rapperswil-Jona Lakers	7	6	6	12	16
Peter Guggisberg	HC Davos	18	6	5	11	4
Radek Hamr	Kloten Flyers	11	2	9	11	22
Marc Reichert	SC Bern	16	6	4	10	4

== Relegation (Playout) ==
After the conclusion of the regular season, the bottom 4 teams will compete in a 4-team elimination playoff, with the losing team advancing to determine which team will face the champions of the National League B. The winner of the best-of-7 series will play in the National League A next season, while the losing team will play in the National League B.

=== Semifinals ===
HC Ambri-Piotta (9) vs. EHC Basel (12)
Date	Away	Score		Home	
February 24	Basel	2	3	Ambrì-Piotta	
February 27	Ambrì-Piotta	5	4	Basel	OT
March 1	Basel	2	4	Ambrì-Piotta	
March 3	Ambrì-Piotta	2	3	Basel	
March 6	Basel	5	4	Ambri-Piotta	OT
March 8	Ambrì-Piotta	2	3	Basel	
March 10	Basel	1	5	Ambrì-Piotta	
HC Ambri-Piotta wins series 4–3

Fribourg-Gottéron HC (10) vs. SCL Tigers (11)
Date	Away	Score		Home	
February 24	Tigers	3	6	Fribourg	
February 27	Fribourg	3	2	Tigers	
March 1	Tigers	3	4	Fribourg	OT
March 3	Fribourg	4	3	Tigers	OT
Fribourg-Gottéron HC wins series 4–0

=== Finals ===
SCL Tigers vs. EHC Basel
Date	Away	Score		Home	
March 13	Basel	0	2	Tigers	
March 15	Tigers	3	4	Basel	
March 17	Basel	2	9	Tigers	
March 20	Tigers	0	4	Basel	
March 22	Basel	4	0	Tigers	
March 24	Tigers	2	3	Basel	OT
EHC Basel wins series 4–2

== League Qualification ==
SCL Tigers vs. EHC Biel
Date	Away	Score		Home
March 29	EHC Biel	1	4	Tigers
March 31	Tigers	5	2	Biel
April 3	Biel	5	2	Tigers
April 5	Tigers	6	1	Biel
April 7	Biel	3	5	Tigers
SCL Tigers wins series 4–1

== Results from Puck.ch ==
- LNA Regular Season 2006-2007
