= 2008–09 NLA season =

2008–09 National League A Season
- League: National League A
- Sport: Ice hockey
- Duration: September 5, 2008 – February 21, 2009
- Number of games: 50
- Number of teams: 12

Regular Season
- Best Record: SC Bern
- Runners-up: ZSC Lions
- Top scorer: Juraj Kolnik (Genève-Servette HC)

Playoffs
- Semi-final #1 champions: Kloten Flyers
- Semi-final #1 runners-up: EV Zug
- Semi-final #2 champions: HC Davos
- Semi-final #2 runners-up: Fribourg-Gottéron

National League A Championship
- Champions: HC Davos
- Runners-up: Kloten Flyers

NLA seasons
- ← 2007–08 2009–10 →

The 2008–09 National League A season, was the second ice hockey season of the National League A since the reorganization of the Swiss league and the 71st in the history of Swiss professional hockey.

== Regular season ==
	Team	GP	W	OTW	OTL	L	GF	GA	Pts
1.	SC Bern	50	30	4	5	11	187	136	103
2.	ZSC Lions	50	26	8	3	13	176	149	97
3.	Kloten Flyers	50	27	6	3	14	174	130	96
4.	HC Davos	50	25	6	5	14	184	135	92
5.	HC Lugano	50	19	8	7	16	175	156	80
6.	Genève-Servette HC	50	22	5	2	21	157	140	78
7.	HC Fribourg-Gottéron	50	19	7	4	20	154	143	75
8.	EV Zug	50	20	3	5	22	171	166	71
9.	SCL Tigers	50	19	5	2	24	170	180	69
10.	Rapperswil-Jona Lakers	50	14	1	5	30	143	208	49
11.	HC Ambrì-Piotta	50	12	1	8	29	129	190	46
12.	EHC Biel	50	11	2	7	30	126	213	44

== Playoffs ==
Quarterfinals
1	SC Bern	2
8	EV Zug	4
2	ZSC Lions	0
7	Fribourg	4
(Pairings are reseeded after the first round)
3	Kloten Flyers	4
6	Genève	0
4	HC Davos	4
5	HC Lugano	3

Semifinals
3	Kloten	4
8	Zug	0
4	Davos	4
7	Fribourg	3

Final
3	Kloten	3
4	Davos	4

== Relegation ==
Semifinals
9	SCL Tigers	4
12	EHC Biel	3
10	Lakers	4
11	Ambrì-Piotta	2

Final
11	Ambrì-Piotta	4
12	Biel	3

EHC Biel would later defeat Lausanne HC, Champions of the National League B, 4-3 to remain in the National League A
