= 2010–11 NLA season =

2010–11 National League A season
- League: National League A
- Sport: Ice hockey
- Number of games: 50
- Number of teams: 12

Regular Season
- Best Record: HC Davos
- Top scorer: Glen Metropolit (EV Zug)

Playoffs
- Semi-final #1 champions: Kloten Flyers
- Semi-final #1 runners-up: SC Bern
- Semi-final #2 champions: HC Davos
- Semi-final #2 runners-up: EV Zug

National League A Championship
- Champions: HC Davos
- Runners-up: Kloten Flyers

NLA seasons
- ← 2009–10 2011–12 →

The 2010–11 National League A season was the fourth ice hockey season of the National League A since the reorganization of the Swiss league. 12 teams participated in the league, which was won by HC Davos.

== Regular season ==
	Team	GP	W	OTW	OTL	L	GF	GA	Pts
1.	HC Davos	50	33	5	4	8	179	103	113
2.	Kloten Flyers	50	33	5	3	9	170	111	112
3.	SC Bern (M)	50	24	11	3	12	160	117	97
4.	EV Zug	50	26	6	4	14	176	143	94
5.	HC Servette Genève	50	20	3	8	19	129	128	74
6.	SCL Tigers	50	19	5	7	19	149	154	74
7.	ZSC Lions	50	17	6	6	21	132	156	69
8.	Fribourg-Gottéron	50	14	8	6	22	157	154	64
9.	EHC Biel	50	13	5	7	25	135	173	56
10.	HC Lugano	50	12	7	5	26	130	159	55
11.	Rapperswil-Jona Lakers	50	11	4	7	28	138	184	48
12.	HC Ambrì-Piotta	50	11	2	7	30	99	172	44

== Playoffs ==
Quarterfinals
1	HC Davos	4
8	Fribourg-Gottéron	0
4	EV Zug	4
5	HC Servette Genève	2
(Pairings are reseeded after the first round)
2	Kloten Flyers	4
7	ZSC Lions	1
3	SC Bern	4
6	SCL Tigers	0

Semifinals
1	HC Davos	4
4	EV Zug	0
2	Kloten Flyers	4
3	SC Bern	3

Final
1	HC Davos	4
2	Kloten Flyers	2

== Relegation ==
Semifinals
10	HC Lugano	4
11	Rapperswil-Jona Lakers	0
9	EHC Biel	4
12	HC Ambrì-Piotta	2

Final
11	Rapperswil-Jona Lakers	4
12	HC Ambrì-Piotta	2

HC Ambrì-Piotta would later defeat EHC Visp of the National League B 4-1 to remain in the National League A.
