= 2016 Spengler Cup =

Ice hockey competition

2016 Spengler Cup Davos, Switzerland
Tournament details
- Host country: Switzerland
- Venue(s): Vaillant Arena
- Dates: 26 – 31 December 2016
- Teams: 6

Final positions
- Champions: Team Canada (14th title)
- Runner-up: (Switzerland) HC Lugano

Tournament statistics
- Games played: 11
- Goals scored: 73 (6.64 per game)
- Attendance: 62,636 (5,694 per game)
- Scoring leader(s): (Canada) Andrew Ebbett (8 pts)

Official website
- Spengler Cup

The 2016 Spengler Cup was an ice hockey competition held in Davos, Switzerland from December 26 to December 31, 2016. All matches were played at HC Davos's home known as Vaillant Arena. Six competing teams were split into two groups of three (in the round-robin series). The two groups, named Torriani and Cattini, are named after legendary Swiss hockey players Richard 'Bibi' Torriani and the Cattini brothers, Hans and Ferdinand.

== Teams participating ==
The list of teams that are participating in the tournament are as listed.

- (Switzerland) HC Davos (host)
- Team Canada
- (Belarus) HC Dinamo Minsk
- (Switzerland) HC Lugano
- (Russia) Avtomobilist Yekaterinburg
- (Czech Republic) Mountfield HK

== Match officials ==
Referees	Linesmen
(Finland) Stefan Fonselius	(Switzerland) Cedric Borga
(United States) Michael Leggo	(Switzerland) Roman Kaderli
(Sweden) Marcus Vinnerborg	(Switzerland) Balázs Kovács
(Switzerland) Tobias Wehrli	(Switzerland) David Obwegeser
(Switzerland) Marc Wiegand	(Switzerland) Simon Wüst

== Group stage ==
=== Key ===
- W (regulation win) – 3 pts.
- OTW (overtime/shootout win) – 2 pts.
- OTL (overtime/shootout loss) – 1 pt.
- L (regulation loss) – 0 pts.

=== Group Torriani ===
Team	Pld	W	OTW	OTL	L	GF	GA	GD	Pts	Qualification
(Switzerland) HC Lugano	2	2	0	0	0	8	5	+3	6	Clinched group
(Czech Republic) Mountfield HK	2	1	0	0	1	7	7	0	3	Quarterfinal berth
(Russia) Avtomobilist Yekaterinburg	2	0	0	0	2	5	8	−3	0	Quarterfinal berth

All times are local (UTC+1).

26 December 2016; 15:00	HC Lugano (Switzerland)	4–2 (1 – 1, 2 – 0, 1 – 1)	(Russia) Avtomobilist Yekaterinburg	Vaillant Arena; Attendance: 6,300

Game reference

Elvis Merzļikins
Goalies
Ivan Lisutin (20:00, 1st period; 12:35, 2nd period)
Vladimir Sokhatsky (7:25, 2nd period; 19:22, 3rd period)
Referees:
(Finland) Stefan Fonselius
(Switzerland) Tobias Wehrli
Linesmen:
(Switzerland) Balázs Kovács
(Switzerland) David Obwegeser

09:39 – Wisniewski (Klasen) (PP)	1 – 0
	1 – 1	Monya (Chesalin) – 17:16
31:24 – Sannitz (Wilson, Wisniewski)	2 – 1
32:35 – Gardner (Fazzini)	3 – 1
	3 – 2	Gareyev (Shchitov) (PP) – 48:21
59:40 – Klasen (Lapierre) (EN)	4 – 2

12:00 min
Penalties
10:00 min
30
Shots
23

27 December 2016; 15:00	Mountfield HK (Czech Republic)	4–3 (1 – 1, 1 – 2, 2 – 0)	(Russia) Avtomobilist Yekaterinburg	Vaillant Arena; Attendance: 6,155

Game reference

Patrik Rybár
Goalies
Vladimir Sokhatsky (00:00–59:25)
Referees:
(Finland) Stefan Fonselius
(Sweden) Marcus Vinnerborg
Linesmen:
(Switzerland) David Obwegeser
(Switzerland) Simon Wüst

	0 – 1	Monya (2) (Timashov, Torchenyuk) – 00:31
04:28 – Jarůšek (PP)	1 – 1
24:51 – Kukumberg (Gregorc)	2 – 1
	2 – 2	Golyshev (Torchenyuk) – 37:20
	2 – 3	Chistov (Vasilevsky) (PP) – 39:43
52:08 – Kukumberg (2) (Pavlas)	3 – 3
55:56 – Jarůšek (2) (Džeriņš) (PP)	4 – 3

12:00 min
Penalties
14:00 min
31
Shots
34

28 December 2016; 15:00	HC Lugano (Switzerland)	4–3 (2 – 1, 2 – 0, 0 – 2)	(Czech Republic) Mountfield HK	Vaillant Arena; Attendance: 6,300

https://www.spenglercup.ch/sites/default/files/game/gamesheet/summary5.pdf

(0:00–51:42) Daniel Manzato
(8:18, 3rd period) Elvis Merzļikins
Goalies
Patrik Rybár (20:00, 1st period; 10:51, 2nd period)
Ondřej Kacetl (9:09, 2nd period; 19:03, 3rd period)
Referees:
(Switzerland) Tobias Wehrli
(Switzerland) Marc Wiegand
Linesmen:
(Switzerland) Cedric Borga
(Switzerland) David Obwegeser

11:09 – Hofmann (Wilson) (PP)	1 – 0
	1 – 1	Simanek (Cerveny, Džeriņš) – 11:53
18:35 – Hofmann (2)	2 – 1
29:23 – Fazzini (Lapierre)	3 – 1
30:51 – Vesce (Klasen)	4 – 1
	4 – 2	Džeriņš (SH) – 43:06
	4 – 3	Cerveny – 51:42

14:00 min
Penalties
12:00 min
23
Shots
38

=== Group Cattini ===
Team	Pld	W	OTW	OTL	L	GF	GA	GD	Pts	Qualification
(Belarus) HC Dinamo Minsk	2	1	0	0	1	11	9	+2	3	Clinched group
(Switzerland) HC Davos	2	1	0	0	1	8	8	0	3	Quarterfinal berth
Team Canada	2	1	0	0	1	8	10	−2	3	Quarterfinal berth

All times are local (UTC+1).

26 December 2016; 20:15	HC Dinamo Minsk (Belarus)	7–4 (2 – 3, 1 – 0, 4 – 1)	Team Canada	Vaillant Arena; Attendance: 6,119

Game reference

Ben Scrivens
Goalies
Drew MacIntyre (00:00–59:38)
Referees:
(Sweden) Marcus Vinnerborg
(Switzerland) Marc Wiegand
Linesmen:
(Switzerland) Cedric Borga
(Switzerland) Roman Kaderli

02:02 – Materukhin (Gotovets)	1 – 0
	1 – 1	Ebbett (Jeffrey, Raymond) – 05:11
	1 – 2	Noreau (Ebbett, Pouliot) (PP2) – 12:57
	1 – 3	Raymond (Flood, Pouliot) (PP) – 13:58
16:50 – Kovyrshin (Komarov, Materukhin)	2 – 3
30:44 – Lisovets (Ellison, Materukhin) (PP)	3 – 3
	3 – 4	Noreau (2) (Micflikier) (PP) – 40:33
46:30 – Korobov (Komarov)	4 – 4
50:25 – Kovryshin (2) (Klinkhammer) (PP)	5 – 4
54:20 – Drozd (Kitarov, Hrabarenka)	6 – 4
58:25 – Komarov (Khenkel, Shinkevich (EN)	7 – 4

12:00 min
Penalties
12:00 min
19
Shots
35

27 December 2016; 20:15	HC Davos (Switzerland)	3–4 (1 – 1, 0 – 1, 2 – 2)	Team Canada	Vaillant Arena; Attendance: 6,300

Game reference

(00:00–59:13) Gilles Senn
Goalies
Zach Fucale
Referees:
(United States) Michael Leggo
(Switzerland) Tobias Wehrli
Linesmen:
(Switzerland) Cedric Borga
(Switzerland) Balázs Kovács

11:09 – Ledin (Ruutu, Forster) (PP)	1 – 0
	1 – 1	Raymond (2) (Ch. Genoway, Jeffrey) – 16:27
	1 – 2	Emmerton (Sheppard) (SH) – 27:57
45:02 – Rahimi (Ruutu, Egli)	2 – 2
	2 – 3	Micflikier (Gormley) (PP) – 46:37
	2 – 4	Ebbett (2) (Ch. Genoway, Raymond) (PP) – 52:40
55:18 – Ledin (2) (M. Wieser, Schneeberger)	3 – 4

20:00 min
Penalties
12:00 min
36
Shots
34

28 December 2016; 20:15	HC Dinamo Minsk (Belarus)	4–5 (1 – 1, 2 – 3, 1 – 1)	(Switzerland) HC Davos	Vaillant Arena; Attendance: 6,300

Game reference

Kevin Lalande
Goalies
Melvin Nyffeler
Referees:
(United States) Michael Leggo
(Sweden) Marcus Vinnerborg
Linesmen:
(Switzerland) Roman Kaderli
(Switzerland) Simon Wüst

Klinkhammer (SH) – 04:54	1 – 0
	1 – 1	16:03 – Hall (Shore, Ruutu) (PP)
	1 – 2	21:28 – Schneeberger (Corvi) (PP)
	1 – 3	22:17 – Lindgren (Ruutu, M. Wieser)
	1 – 4	29:31 – Shore (Ledin, Schneeberger) (PP)
Karaban – 29:46	2 – 4
Pavlovich – 30:38	3 – 4
	3 – 5	41:40 – Corvi
Pavlovich (2) (Klinkhammer) (PP) – 47:35	4 – 5

16:00 min
Penalties
18:00 min
20
Shots
19

== Knockout stage ==
Quarterfinals
A2	(Czech Republic) Mountfield HK	1
B3	Team Canada	5
B2	(Switzerland) HC Davos	3
A3	(Russia) Avtomobilist Yekaterinburg	1

Semifinals
B1	(Belarus) HC Dinamo Minsk	2
QF1	Team Canada	3
A1	(Switzerland) HC Lugano	4
QF2	(Switzerland) HC Davos	0

Final
SF1	Team Canada	5
SF2	(Switzerland) HC Lugano	2

=== Quarterfinals ===
All times are local (UTC+1).

29 December 2016; 15:00	Mountfield HK (Czech Republic)	1–5 (0 – 2, 1 – 1, 0 – 2)	Team Canada	Vaillant Arena; Attendance: 6,012

Game reference

Ondřej Kacetl
Goalies
Zach Fucale
Referees:
(Switzerland) Tobias Wehrli
(Switzerland) Marc Wiegand
Linesmen:
(Switzerland) Roman Kaderli
(Switzerland) David Obwegeser

	0 – 1	04:19 – Ebbett (3) (Katic, Raymond)
	0 – 2	19:41 – Noreau (3) (DiDomenico, Gormley)
	0 – 3	33:32 – Gormley (Raymond, Ebbett)
Bednář (Gregorc, Dej) (PP) – 39:20	1 – 3
	1 – 4	42:24 – Raymond (3) (Flood, Ebbett) (PP)
	1 – 5	43:01 – Paré (Gormley, Heshka)

20:00 min
Penalties
12:00 min
20
Shots
30

29 December 2016; 20:15	HC Davos (Switzerland)	3–1 (2 – 1, 0 – 0, 1 – 0)	(Russia) Avtomobilist Yekaterinburg	Vaillant Arena; Attendance: 6,300

Game reference

Gilles Senn
Goalies
Ivan Lisutin
Referees:
(Finland) Stefan Fonselius
(United States) Michael Leggo
Linesmen:
(Switzerland) Balázs Kovács
(Switzerland) Simon Wüst

Ruutu (Shore, Paschoud) (PP) – 05:28	1 – 0
Shore (D. Wieser, Simion) – 08:35	2 – 0
	2 – 1	17:58 – Golyshev (Turbin)
M. Wieser (Ruutu, Jung) – 43:39	3 – 1

8:00 min
Penalties
14:00 min
22
Shots
32

=== Semifinals ===
All times are local (UTC+1).

30 December 2016; 15:00	HC Dinamo Minsk (Belarus)	2–3 (0 – 2, 1 – 0, 1 – 1)	Team Canada	Vaillant Arena; Attendance: 6300

Game reference

Ben Scrivens (20:00, 1st period; 20:00, 2nd period; 18:16, 3rd period)
Goalies
Zach Fucale
Referees:
(Finland) Stefan Fonselius
(Switzerland) Marc Wiegand
Linesmen:
(Switzerland) Cedric Borga
(Switzerland) Balázs Kovács

	0–1	07:07 – Pouliot (Micflickier, Didomenico)
	0–2	14:03 – Didomenico (Noreau) (PP)
Stepanov (Pettersson) (PP) – 21:44	1–2
	1–3	52:29 – Ch. Genoway (Pouliot)
Ellison (Korobov, Kovyrshin) (PP) – 55:16	2–3

26:00 min
Penalties
22:00 min
23
Shots
37

30 December 2016; 20:15	HC Lugano (Switzerland)	4–0 (1 – 0, 2 – 0, 1 – 0)	(Switzerland) HC Davos	Vaillant Arena; Attendance: 6300

Game reference

Elvis Merzļikins
Goalies
Melvin Nyffeler
Referees:
(Finland) Stefan Fonselius
(Sweden) Marcus Vinnerborg
Linesmen:
(Switzerland) Roman Kaderli
(Switzerland) Simon Wüst

Klasen (Wisniewski, Mårtensson) – 16:59	1–0
Bürgler (Vesce) (PP) – 31:23	2–0
Chiesa (Walker, Lapierre) – 35:01	3–0
Bertaggia (Hofmann) (SH) – 45:54	4–0

26:00 min
Penalties
24:00 min
33
Shots
35

=== Final ===
All times are local (UTC+1).

31 December 2016; 12:00	Team Canada	5–2 (1 – 1, 3 – 0, 1 – 1)	(Switzerland) HC Lugano	Vaillant Arena; Attendance: 6300

Game reference

Zachary Fucale
Goalies
Elvis Merzļikins (20:00, 1st period; 20:00, 2nd period)
Stefan Müller (00:00–18:13, 3rd period)
Referees:
(Sweden) Marcus Vinnerborg
(Switzerland) Marc Wiegand
Linesmen:
(Switzerland) Roman Kaderli
(Switzerland) Simon Wúst

	0–1	00:31 – Bürgler (2) (Zackrisson)
Ch. Genoway (2) (Spaling) – 06:03	1–1
Pouliot (2) (Micflickier, Didomenico) – 20:59	2–1
Emmerton (2) (Spaling, Parlett) (SH) – 22:59	3–1
Ebbett (4) (Raymond) – 37:17	4–1
	4–2	44:08 – Bürgler (3) (Wisniewski) (PP)
Spaling (Ebbett) (EN) – 59:43	5–2

24:00 min
Penalties
12:00 min
47
Shots
42

== Champions ==
2016 Spengler Cup Winners
(Canada)
Team Canada
Repeat Champions
14th title

== All-Star Team ==
All-Star Team
Position	Player	Nationality	Team
Goaltender	Elvis Merzļikins	(Latvia) Latvian	(Switzerland) HC Lugano
Right Defender	Maxim Noreau	(Canada) Canadian	Team Canada
Left Defender	James Wisniewski	(United States) American	(Switzerland) HC Lugano
Right Wing	Evgeni Kovyrshin	(Belarus) Belarusian	(Belarus) HC Dinamo Minsk
Center	Andrew Ebbett	(Canada) Canadian	Team Canada
Left Wing	Drew Shore	(United States) American	(Switzerland) HC Davos

== Statistics ==
=== Scoring leaders ===
As of Game 9

Player	Team	GP	G	A	Pts
Team Canada	Andrew Ebbett	0	3	3	6
(Switzerland) HC Davos	Tuomo Ruutu	0	1	5	6
Team Canada	Mason Raymond	0	3	2	5
Team Canada	Maxim Noreau	0	3	1	4
(Switzerland) HC Davos	Drew Shore	0	2	2	4

GP = Games played; G = Goals; A = Assists; Pts = Points

== Television broadcast ==
Territory	Rights holder	Ref
Andorra; Australasia (Note: Rights in Australia and New Zealand); Comoros; Dominican Republic; France; French Guiana; French Polynesia; Guadeloupe; Haiti; Martinique; Mauritius; Mayotte; Monaco; Réunion; Saint-Martin; Saint Pierre and Miquelon; Seychelles; Tonga; Trinidad and Tobago; Vanuatu; Venezuela; Wallis and Futuna	L'Equipe TV	
Balkans (Note: Rights in Bosnia and Herzegovina, Croatia, Kosovo, Macedonia, Montenegro and Serbia; the competition was aired in Kosovo on a non-exclusive basis)	Arena Sport	
Belarus	Belteleradio	
Canada	TSN/RDS	
Czech Republic; Slovakia	Digi TV	
Denmark	TV 2	
Finland	MTV Finland	
Germany	Sport1 (Germany)	
Hungary	Sport2	
Russia	Match TV/NTV Plus	
Slovenia	Šport TV	
Switzerland	SRG SSR	
Worldwide (Note: Except in Switzerland, Canada, Mexico, and the United States)	YouTube	
