= Maxim Noreau =

Canadian ice hockey player (born 1987)

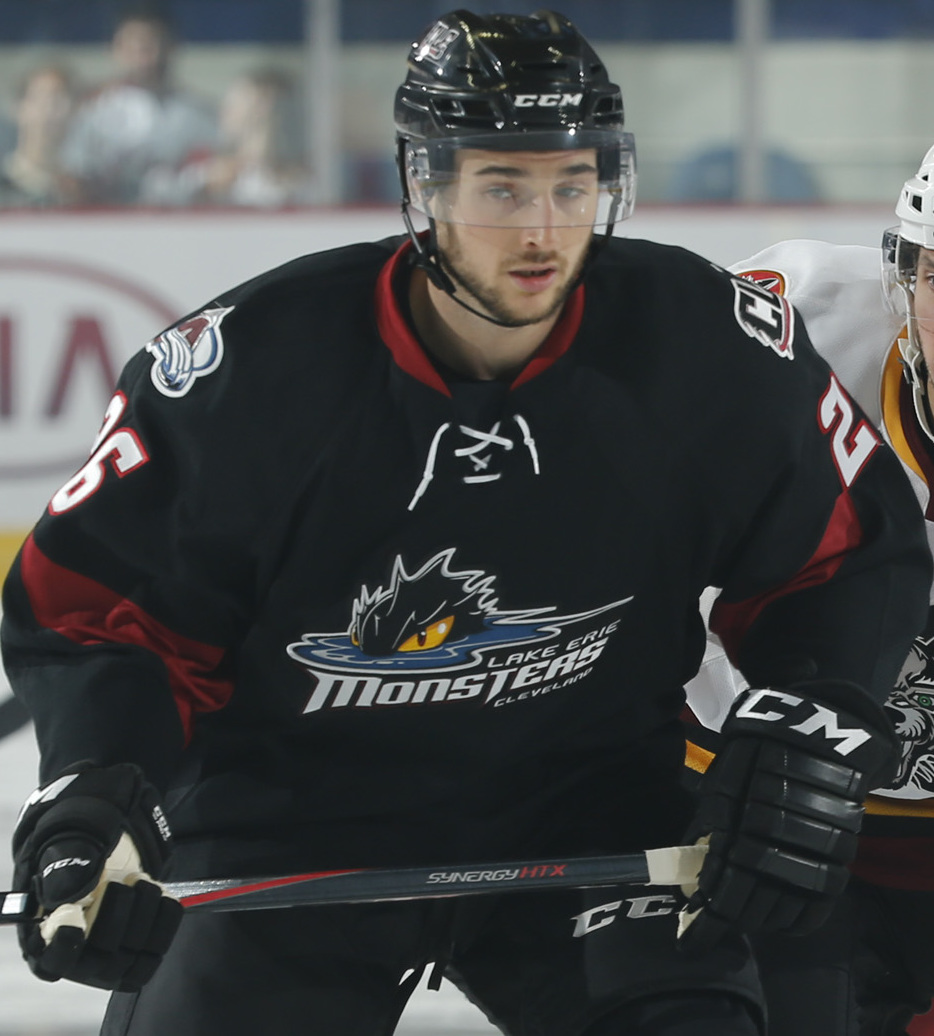
- Noreau with the Lake Erie Monsters in 2014
- Born: May 24, 1987 (age 39) Montreal, Quebec, Canada
- Height: 6 ft 0 in (183 cm)
- Weight: 198 lb (90 kg; 14 st 2 lb)
- Position: Defence
- Shot: Right
- Played for: SC Rapperswil-Jona Lakers; ZSC Lions; SC Bern; HC Ambrì-Piotta; Minnesota Wild
- National team: Canada
- NHL draft: Undrafted
- Playing career: 2007–2024

Maxim Noreau (born May 24, 1987) is a Canadian former professional ice hockey defenceman. He played 6 games in the National Hockey League (NHL) with the Minnesota Wild from 2010 to 2011. The rest of his career, which lasted from 2007 to 2024, was mainly spent in the Swiss National League. Internationally he played for the Canadian national team at the 2018 and 2022 Winter Olympics, winning a bronze medal in 2018.

== Playing career ==
On May 22, 2008, Noreau was signed as a free agent to a three-year entry-level contract with the Minnesota Wild. He spent most of the 2009–10 season with the Houston Aeros of the American Hockey League. He posted 52 points in 76 games to earn selection in the AHL Second All-Star Team. Noreau also made his National Hockey League debut on April 8, 2010, with the Minnesota Wild.

Following the conclusion of the 2010–11 season, Noreau was traded from the Wild to the New Jersey Devils for David McIntyre on June 16, 2011. With his rights owned by the Devils on August 1, 2011, Noreau signed a one-year European deal with HC Ambri-Piotta of the Swiss National League A. In his first season with Piotta in 2011–12, Noreau led the defense and scored 30 points in 44 games. As a result, he was selected to the NLA All-Star Team and was re-signed to a three-year contract extension on November 6, 2011. In the 2012–13 season, despite missing out on the post-season for the second consecutive season, he was again the offensive presence from the blueline for Piotta, contributing with 10 goals and 35 assists to lead the league in defensive scoring.

Noreau posted 102 points in 146 games over three seasons before he was released from the final year of his contract with Ambri-Piotta to sign a two-year, one-way contract with the Colorado Avalanche on July 7, 2014. He spent the entirety of his contract within the Avalanche's AHL affiliates. During the 2014–15 season with the Lake Erie Monsters, he was leading defensemen with 30 points in 39 games before he suffered a season-ending injury. In the following season, Noreau was reassigned to new AHL affiliate, the San Antonio Rampage, again leading the blueline in scoring, placing second overall among the Rampage with 45 points in 64 games.

In April 2016, unable to further his NHL career, Noreau put pen to paper on a two-year deal to return to Switzerland with SC Bern of the NLA

On March 1, 2018, Noreau agreed to a two-year contract with rival NL club, the ZSC Lions, worth CHF 1.8 million, starting from the 2018–19 season.

== International play ==
Medal record

Ice hockey

Representing Canada

Spengler Cup
| Gold medal – first place | 2012 Davos | |
| Gold medal – first place | 2016 Davos | |
| Gold medal – first place | 2017 Davos | |
| Gold medal – first place | 2019 Davos | |

Olympic Games
| Bronze medal – third place | 2018 Pyeongchang | |

In December 2016, he won his second Spengler Cup with Team Canada and was named to the tournament's all-star team. One year later, he captained Canada to another victory at the Spengler Cup.

In January 2022, Noreau was selected to play for Team Canada at the 2022 Winter Olympics, marking his second consecutive Olympic appearance.

== Personal ==
His younger brother, Samuel Noreau, was also professional hockey player, and was a prospect within the New York Rangers organization.

== Career statistics ==
=== Regular season and playoffs ===
| | | | Regular season | | | | | Playoffs |
| Season | Team | League | GP | G | A | Pts | PIM | GP | G | A | Pts | PIM |
|---|---|---|---|---|---|---|---|---|---|---|---|---|
| 2003–04 | West Island Lions | QMAAA | 42 | 12 | 20 | 32 | 82 | — | — | — | — | — |
| 2004–05 | Victoriaville Tigres | QMJHL | 65 | 5 | 8 | 13 | 47 | 7 | 0 | 0 | 0 | 8 |
| 2005–06 | Victoriaville Tigres | QMJHL | 69 | 22 | 43 | 65 | 116 | 5 | 2 | 4 | 6 | 7 |
| 2006–07 | Victoriaville Tigres | QMJHL | 69 | 17 | 53 | 70 | 106 | 6 | 2 | 1 | 3 | 8 |
| 2007–08 | Texas Wildcatters | ECHL | 2 | 0 | 3 | 3 | 0 | — | — | — | — | — |
| 2007–08 | Houston Aeros | AHL | 50 | 8 | 8 | 16 | 48 | 5 | 0 | 0 | 0 | 4 |
| 2008–09 | Houston Aeros | AHL | 77 | 14 | 25 | 39 | 49 | 20 | 4 | 7 | 11 | 2 |
| 2009–10 | Houston Aeros | AHL | 76 | 18 | 34 | 52 | 60 | — | — | — | — | — |
| 2009–10 | Minnesota Wild | NHL | 1 | 0 | 0 | 0 | 0 | — | — | — | — | — |
| 2010–11 | Houston Aeros | AHL | 76 | 10 | 44 | 54 | 58 | 24 | 2 | 10 | 12 | 23 |
| 2010–11 | Minnesota Wild | NHL | 5 | 0 | 0 | 0 | 0 | — | — | — | — | — |
| 2011–12 | HC Ambrì–Piotta | NLA | 44 | 7 | 23 | 30 | 22 | — | — | — | — | — |
| 2012–13 | HC Ambrì–Piotta | NLA | 45 | 10 | 25 | 35 | 38 | — | — | — | — | — |
| 2013–14 | HC Ambrì–Piotta | NLA | 35 | 8 | 16 | 24 | 28 | 4 | 0 | 0 | 0 | 2 |
| 2014–15 | Lake Erie Monsters | AHL | 39 | 8 | 22 | 30 | 29 | — | — | — | — | — |
| 2015–16 | San Antonio Rampage | AHL | 64 | 12 | 33 | 45 | 31 | — | — | — | — | — |
| 2016–17 | SC Bern | NLA | 35 | 4 | 14 | 18 | 8 | 4 | 1 | 2 | 3 | 4 |
| 2017–18 | SC Bern | NL | 32 | 8 | 16 | 24 | 18 | 11 | 1 | 6 | 7 | 2 |
| 2018–19 | ZSC Lions | NL | 46 | 11 | 16 | 27 | 38 | — | — | — | — | — |
| 2019–20 | ZSC Lions | NL | 45 | 10 | 29 | 39 | 26 | — | — | — | — | — |
| 2020–21 | ZSC Lions | NL | 50 | 5 | 31 | 36 | 35 | 8 | 0 | 3 | 3 | 0 |
| 2021–22 | ZSC Lions | NL | 48 | 8 | 30 | 38 | 10 | 18 | 3 | 11 | 14 | 8 |
| NHL totals | | | 6 | 0 | 0 | 0 | 0 | — | — | — | — | — |
| NL totals | | | 380 | 71 | 200 | 271 | 223 | 50 | 6 | 25 | 31 | 18 |

=== International ===
| Year | Team | Event | Result | GP | G | A | Pts | PIM |
|---|---|---|---|---|---|---|---|---|
| 2012 | Canada | SC | 1st place, gold medalist(s) | 4 | 0 | 0 | 0 | 2 |
| 2013 | Canada | SC | 4th | 2 | 1 | 0 | 1 | 0 |
| 2016 | Canada | SC | 1st place, gold medalist(s) | 5 | 3 | 1 | 4 | 0 |
| 2017 | Canada | SC | 1st place, gold medalist(s) | 9 | 5 | 6 | 11 | 0 |
| 2018 | Canada | OG | 3rd place, bronze medalist(s) | 6 | 2 | 5 | 7 | 0 |
| 2022 | Canada | OG | 6th | 5 | 1 | 3 | 4 | 0 |
| Senior totals | | | | 11 | 3 | 8 | 11 | 0 |

== Awards and honours ==
| Award | Year |
AHL
| First All-Star Team | 2011 |
| Second All-Star Team | 2010 |
NLA
| All-Star Team | 2012 |
| Most assists by defenceman | 2013 |
| Most points by defenceman | 2013 |
| Most goals by defenceman | 2014 |
International
| Olympic All-Star Team | 2018 |
