= Mason Raymond =

Canadian ice hockey player (born 1985)

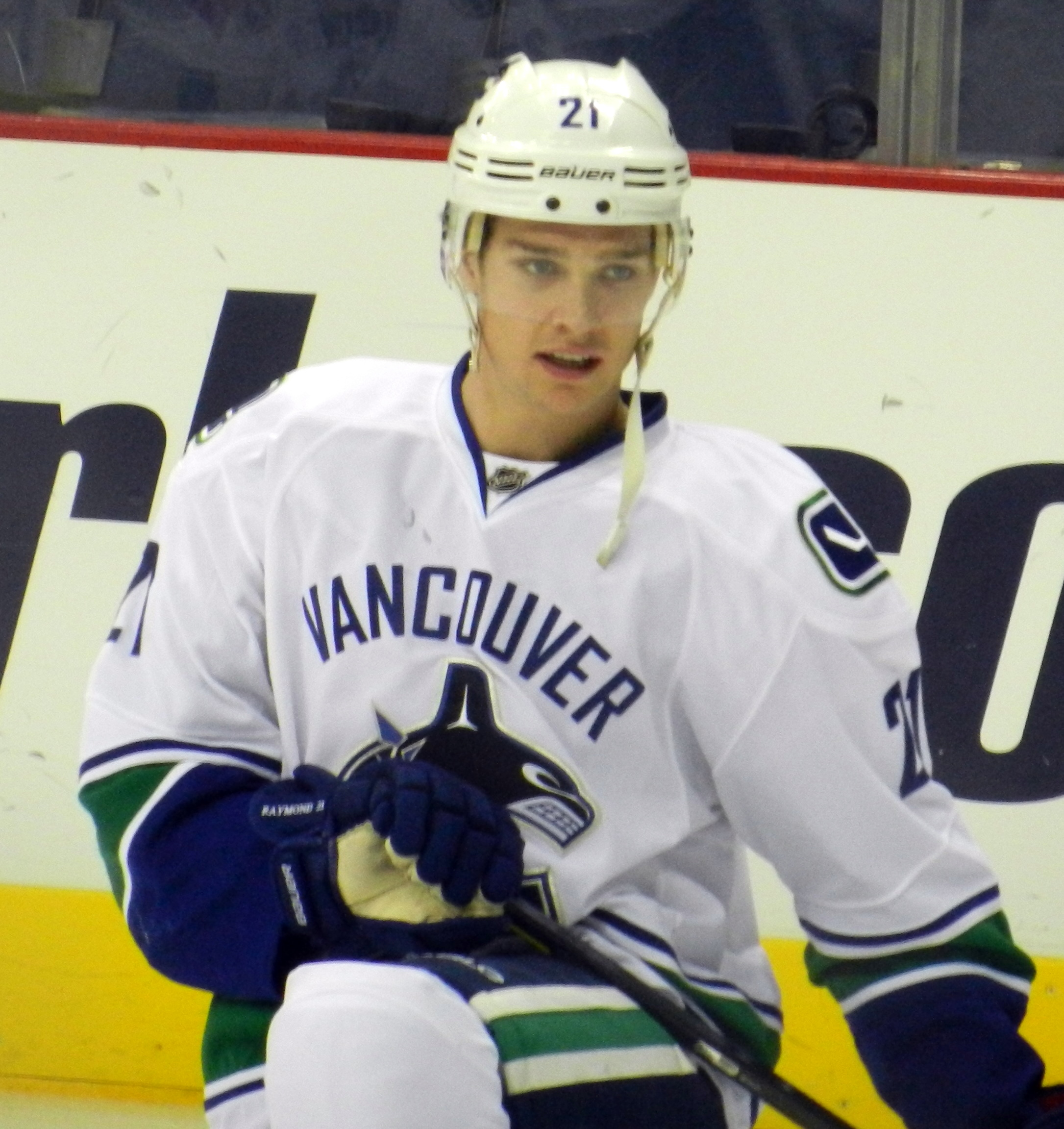
- Raymond with the Vancouver Canucks in December 2011
- Born: September 17, 1985 (age 41) Cochrane, Alberta, Canada
- Height: 6 ft 0 in (183 cm)
- Weight: 185 lb (84 kg; 13 st 3 lb)
- Position: Winger
- Shot: Left
- Played for: Vancouver Canucks; Toronto Maple Leafs; Calgary Flames; Anaheim Ducks; SC Bern
- National team: Canada
- NHL draft: 51st overall, 2005; Vancouver Canucks
- Playing career: 2007–2018

Mason Evan Raymond (born September 17, 1985) is a Canadian former professional ice hockey player. He played as a winger in the National Hockey League (NHL) for the Vancouver Canucks, Toronto Maple Leafs, Calgary Flames and the Anaheim Ducks. Internationally, he represented Canada, and has won a bronze medal with them in the 2018 Winter Olympics.

Born in Cochrane, Alberta, but growing up in Calgary, Alberta, he played Junior A in the Alberta Junior Hockey League (AJHL) for two seasons, where he captured league and regional titles with the Camrose Kodiaks, while also being named league MVP in 2005. He then joined the college ranks with the Minnesota-Duluth Bulldogs of the Western Collegiate Hockey Association (WCHA) for a two-year tenure there, as well. He earned WCHA All-Rookie honours in 2006, WCHA First Team All-Star honours in 2007, and was also named the Bulldogs' most valuable player in 2007. Raymond was drafted by the Vancouver Canucks in the 2005 NHL entry draft in the second round, 51st overall.

After spending parts of two seasons with their American Hockey League (AHL) affiliate, the Manitoba Moose, he joined the club full-time in 2007–08. He is known as a fast-skating offensive player.

== Playing career ==
=== Junior and college ===
After playing AAA midget with the Strathmore Bisons of the Foothills Bisons Hockey Association, Raymond began a two-year Junior A career with the Camrose Kodiaks of the AJHL in 2003–04. Raymond had been hesitant about pursuing his career due to a lack of interest from major junior teams, but his friend Dan Bertram encouraged him to play with him in Camrose. Bertram also played midget with Raymond and went on to be a Chicago Blackhawks draft pick, three selections after him.

Raymond posted a team-high 27 goals and 62 points as a rookie, including six game winning goals. Following his first junior season, Raymond was recruited by the Minnesota-Duluth Bulldogs of the Western Collegiate Hockey Association (WCHA). Having earned an athletic scholarship, he had the choice of playing one more season with Camrose or to make the jump to the college ranks. He consulted with Kodiaks head coach Boris Rybalka and was challenged to improve at the Junior A level before moving to Minnesota-Duluth. As a result, Raymond remained in Camrose, signing a letter of intent in November 2004 to join the Minnesota-Duluth the following year for the 2005–06 season. Several other National Collegiate Athletic Association (NCAA) schools had recruited Raymond as well, including the University of Denver, Western Michigan University and the University of Alaska-Fairbanks. He chose the Bulldogs because he knew that, with 11 seniors leaving their team the following season, he would have the biggest role with that club.

Raymond went on to lead the AJHL in scoring with 41 goals and was named league MVP in 2004–05. He added 20 points in 15 post-season games as the Kodiaks captured the Rogers Wireless Cup as league champions to advance to the 2005 Doyle Cup, Canada's Pacific Junior A regional championship. During the competition, Raymond was hospitalized with fatigue and dehydration that decreased his weight to 150 pounds. Though he missed the final against the British Columbia Hockey League's Surrey Eagles, the Kodiaks won without him and advanced to the 2005 Royal Bank Cup, Canada's national Junior A tournament. Raymond returned to action as the Kodiaks advanced to the national level at the 2005 Royal Bank Cup. He led the tournament in scoring with 10 points (4 goals and 6 assists) over 5 games as Camrose finished as runner-up to the tournament host Weyburn Red Wings of the Saskatchewan Junior Hockey League. The Kodiaks later retired Raymond's number 9 prior to their season-opening game against the Okotoks Oilers on September 10, 2010.

Raymond was selected in the 2005 NHL entry draft by the Vancouver Canucks in the second round, 51st overall. He was draft-eligible in 2004, but opted out due to his low ranking at the time. He was scouted by Canucks general manager Dave Nonis as a fast skater with the puck who needed to work on his strength.

Following his draft, he joined the Minnesota-Duluth Bulldogs. Scoring 11 goals and 28 points over 40 games, he was named to the WCHA All-Rookie Team for the 2005–06 season. In his sophomore campaign, Raymond led the Bulldogs in scoring with 14 goals, 32 assists and 46 points. Raymond's points total was good for second in league scoring behind Jonathan Toews. He received WCHA Player of the Week honours twice and was awarded the Mike Seiler Award, as the Bulldogs' Most Valuable Player. His college career ended after the Bulldogs were eliminated by the St. Cloud State Huskies in the second round of the WCHA playoffs.

=== Vancouver Canucks (2007–2013) ===
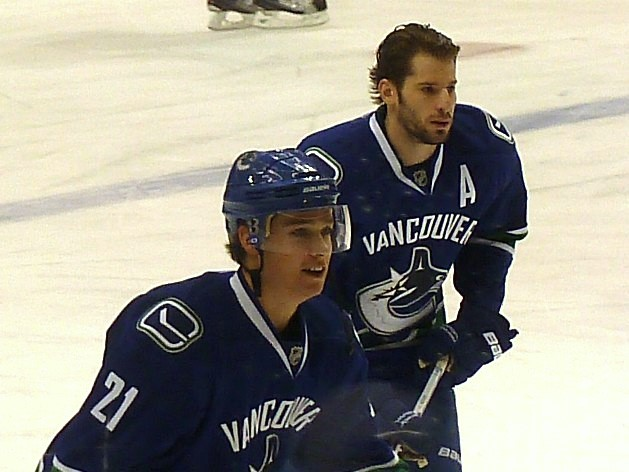
Raymond (left) skates with linemate Ryan Kesler prior to a game in February 2011.

Raymond chose to forgo his final two years of college eligibility to turn professional and signed an amateur tryout contract with the Canucks' minor league affiliate, the Manitoba Moose of the AHL. He scored his first AHL goal in his debut with the Moose on March 23, 2007. The goal was the game winner against goaltender Stefan Liv with four minutes remaining in a 3–2 victory against the Grand Rapids Griffins. Following his second AHL game, the Canucks signed him to an NHL contract. He completed his 11-game regular season in the AHL with two goals and two assists. In the subsequent 2007 playoffs, he added an assist in 13 games, as the Moose were eliminated by the Hamilton Bulldogs in the second round.

The following season, Raymond made the Canucks' roster out of training camp and made his NHL debut on the team's top line with Henrik and Daniel Sedin. He picked up his first NHL point, an assist on a Brendan Morrison goal, in the season-opener against the San Jose Sharks on October 5, 2007. Soon thereafter, he was sent down to the Moose for a two-day assignment after having been a healthy scratch. He returned to the Canucks on October 18, and was later returned to the Moose at the end of the month for a longer assignment. Succeeding at the AHL level, Raymond recorded a five-point game with a hat trick and two assists during a match against the Rochester Americans on November 21, 2007. The Canucks recalled him the following month on December 11 following injuries to forwards Brendan Morrison and Brad Isbister. The next day, he scored his first NHL goal in his first game back against goaltender Jean-Sébastien Giguère of the Anaheim Ducks. The goal came assisted on a one-timer pass from Moose teammate Jason Jaffray, who had been called up from Manitoba the same day as Raymond. Later that game, he also assisted Jaffray's first NHL goal in the third period. The Canucks went on to win the game, 3–2. Known for his skating ability, Raymond won the fastest skater segment of the Canucks' 2008 SuperSkills Competition with a time of 14.283 seconds. A week later, he was reassigned to the Moose one last time on January 13, 2008, for three days, before remaining with the Canucks. On March 17, he suffered an injury after a knee-on-knee collision with defenceman Keith Ballard in a game against the Phoenix Coyotes, sidelining him for the final eight games of the season. He finished his rookie NHL campaign with 21 points in 49 games with the Canucks, while also recording seven goals and 17 points in 20 games with the Moose.

Raymond had a quick start to 2008–09, scoring 10 points in his first 13 games, but trailed off to add just 13 points for the remainder of the campaign. Midway through the season, he was named to the 2009 YoungStars Game in Montreal, helping the sophomores beat the rookie team 9–5. He finished his second NHL season with 11 goals and 12 assists in 72 games. In the ensuing 2009 playoffs, where the Canucks entered as the third seed in the Western Conference. After the Canucks would sweep the sixth-seeded St. Louis Blues in the opening round, Raymond scored his first NHL post-season goal in game three of the second round against the Chicago Blackhawks on Blackhawks' goaltender Nikolai Khabibulin, a 3–1 win for the Canucks. Vancouver went on to be eliminated by the fourth-seeded Blackhawks in six games. Raymond finished with two goals and an assist in all 10 post-season contests.

Raymond recorded his first NHL hat trick with the game's final three goals in a 5–1 win against the Calgary Flames on December 27, 2009. Raymond enjoyed a breakout campaign in his third NHL season, playing regularly on the Canucks' second line with centre Ryan Kesler and newly acquired winger Mikael Samuelsson. He finished the 2009–10 season with a career-high 25 goals, 28 assists and 53 points in all 82 contests played. Prior to the final game of the season on April 10, 2010 against the Calgary Flames, he was voted by the Canucks' booster club to receive the Fred J. Hume Award as the team's "unsung hero". The Canucks entered the 2010 playoffs as the third seed in the West for the second consecutive year. Raymond contributed three goals and an assist over all 12 post-season games as Vancouver eliminated the sixth-seeded Los Angeles Kings in the opening round in six games and were eventually eliminated once again in the second round in six games by the second-seeded and eventual Stanley Cup champion Chicago Blackhawks.

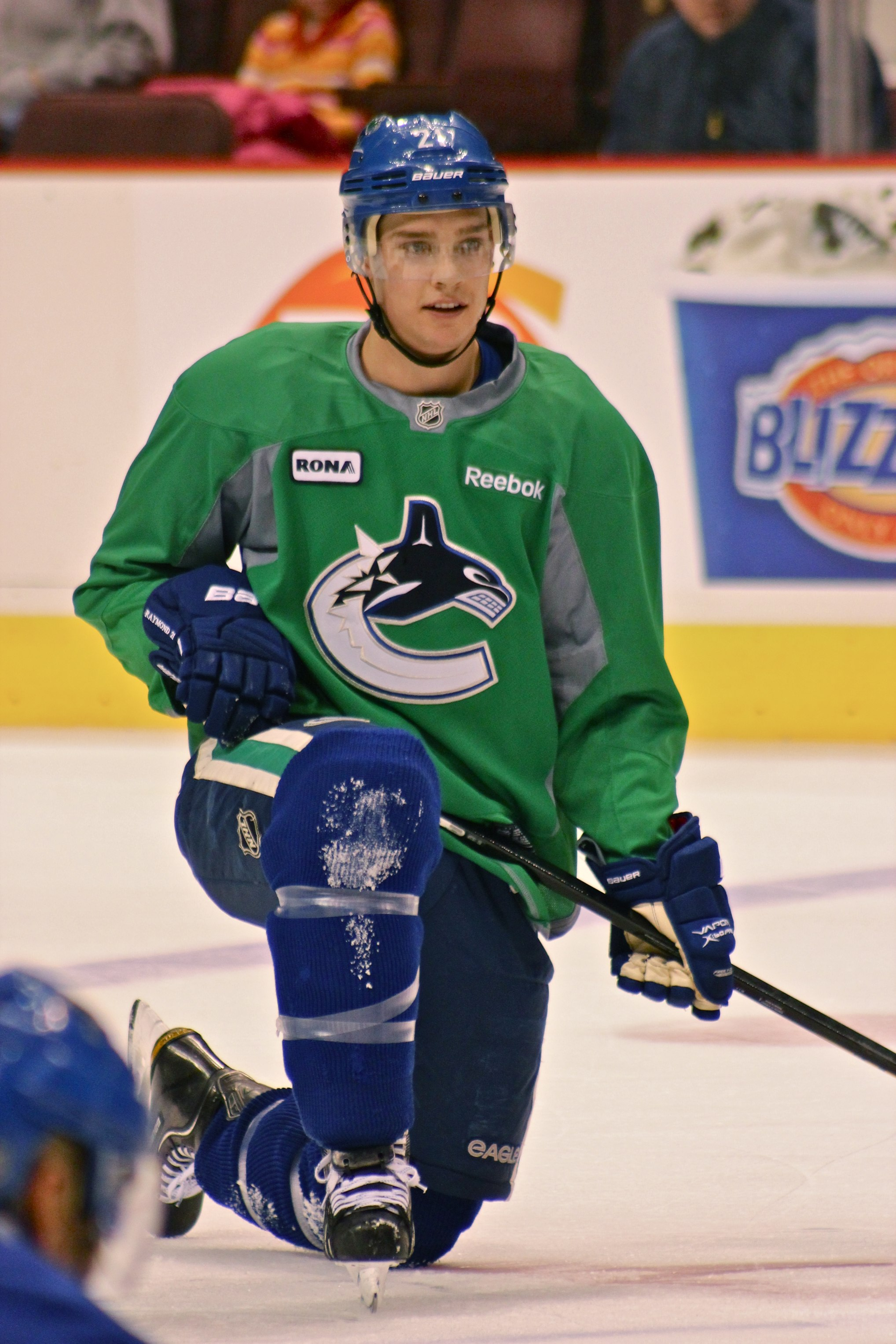
Raymond practicing with the Canucks in March 2012

Becoming a restricted free agent on July 1, 2010, Raymond filed for salary arbitration after initially failing to come to terms with the Canucks. However, the two sides later agreed to a two-year, $5.1 million contract on July 26, 2010, before their arbitration hearing scheduled for the same day. The deal pays Raymond $2.5 million in the first year and $2.6 million in the second – a raise from his $760,000 salary from the previous season. It was reported the Canucks had proposed an annual $2.3 million salary, while Raymond had wanted $3.6 million. Several months into the 2010–11 season, he suffered a broken thumb and missed 10 games in December 2010. Raymond struggled in the first year of his new contract and he was often demoted off of the second line. As a result, he finished with diminished season totals of 15 goals, 24 assists and 39 points in 70 games. On a team basis, the Canucks won their first-ever Presidents' Trophy, having accomplished the best regular-season record in the NHL that year. Entering the 2011 playoffs as the first seed in the West, they eliminated the defending Stanley Cup champion and eighth-seeded Chicago Blackhawks along with the fifth-seeded Nashville Predators and the second-seeded San Jose Sharks in the first three rounds to advance to the Stanley Cup Finals for the first time in 17 years matching up against the third-seeded Boston Bruins. During his first shift of Game 6 against the Bruins at TD Garden on June 13, 2011, a game in which the Canucks had a 3–2 lead in the series going into and had an opportunity to clinch the Stanley Cup with a win, Raymond suffered a fractured vertebra after getting hit by opposing defenceman Johnny Boychuk. With Raymond's body twisted to try to retrieve a loose puck, he was engaged by Boychuk, who proceeded to hit him into the boards after the puck had gone by. Bent over at the time of the hit, Raymond collided with the boards tailbone-first. He was taken to the hospital after initially being helped off the ice by linemates Ryan Kesler and Chris Higgins. Raymond later described the injury as "the most pain [he's] been in ever." No penalty was called on the play nor did Boychuk receive any discipline from the league following the game, which drew public criticism from Canucks general manager Mike Gillis. Vancouver went on to lose Games 6 5–2 as the series shifted back to Vancouver for Game 7 two days later where the Canucks would lose 4–0 as Boston won the series 4–3 for the Stanley Cup. Raymond made an appearance in Rogers Arena during the seventh game of the series. Wearing a plastic corset to support his back, he waved to the crowd, who gave him a standing ovation.

While the injury did not require surgery, Raymond retained the back brace for six weeks and was largely immobile for two months. In late-July 2011, he received a text message from Boychuk, explaining that his intention was not to injure with the hit. Unable to train on the ice or with weights, Raymond spent the 2011 off-season largely inactive, with the exception of cardiovascular workouts in preparation for the upcoming 2011–12 season. Five-and-a-half months after sustaining his back injury, Raymond was set to return to the Canucks' lineup for a game against the Nashville Predators on December 1, 2011. However, the team failed to file the proper paperwork to the NHL by the 5 p.m. deadline, delaying Raymond's return until the following game on December 4 against the Calgary Flames. He recorded six points (three goals and three assists) in his first seven games back, but struggled to produce offensively for the remainder of the season. On March 19, 2012, he was made a healthy scratch for the first time in three years in a 2–0 against the Minnesota Wild. He would end the season with 10 goals and assists for 20 points in 55 games while playing mostly on the teams third line. Despite his individual struggles, the Canucks continued to excel as a team as they would end the season having won a second consecutive Presidents' Trophy and second in franchise history altogether. Despite their continued regular season dominance, the Canucks would fall in five games in the first round of the 2012 playoffs by the eighth-seeded and eventual Stanley Cup champion Los Angeles Kings. He finished the playoffs goalless with an assist for a point in all five games.

On December 26, 2012, Swedish second-league team Örebro HK presented Raymond on an 11-game contract, starting on January 3, 2013. He has as of January 6, made 1 point, the 1–0 goal against IK Oskarshamn the previous day. Raymond would play 46 games and recording 10 goals, 12 assists and 22 points in the lockout-shortened 2012–13 season for the Canucks as they finished the season as the third seed in the West before getting swept in the opening round of the 2013 playoffs by the sixth-seeded San Jose Sharks with Raymond recording a goal and an assist for two points in all four games.

=== Toronto Maple Leafs (2013–2014) ===
In September 2013, Raymond signed a try-out contract with the Toronto Maple Leafs then a one-year contract with the club. In the third game of the 2013–14 campaign, Raymond scored a goal and two assists on goals by Nazem Kadri and Joffrey Lupul, and scored the shootout winner as the Maple Leafs won the game 5-4 against the Ottawa Senators. The assist on Lupul's goal was Raymond's 100th career assist. Despite not being a physical player, Raymond gained notoriety in Toronto when he threw a hard hit on Senators' forward Chris Neil in the first period. The hit left Neil a little woozy and shaken up. Raymond enjoyed a bounce-back season in 2013–14, scoring 19 goals and 45 points in all 82 games, his best statistics since the 2009–10 season with the Canucks.

=== Calgary Flames (2014–2016) ===
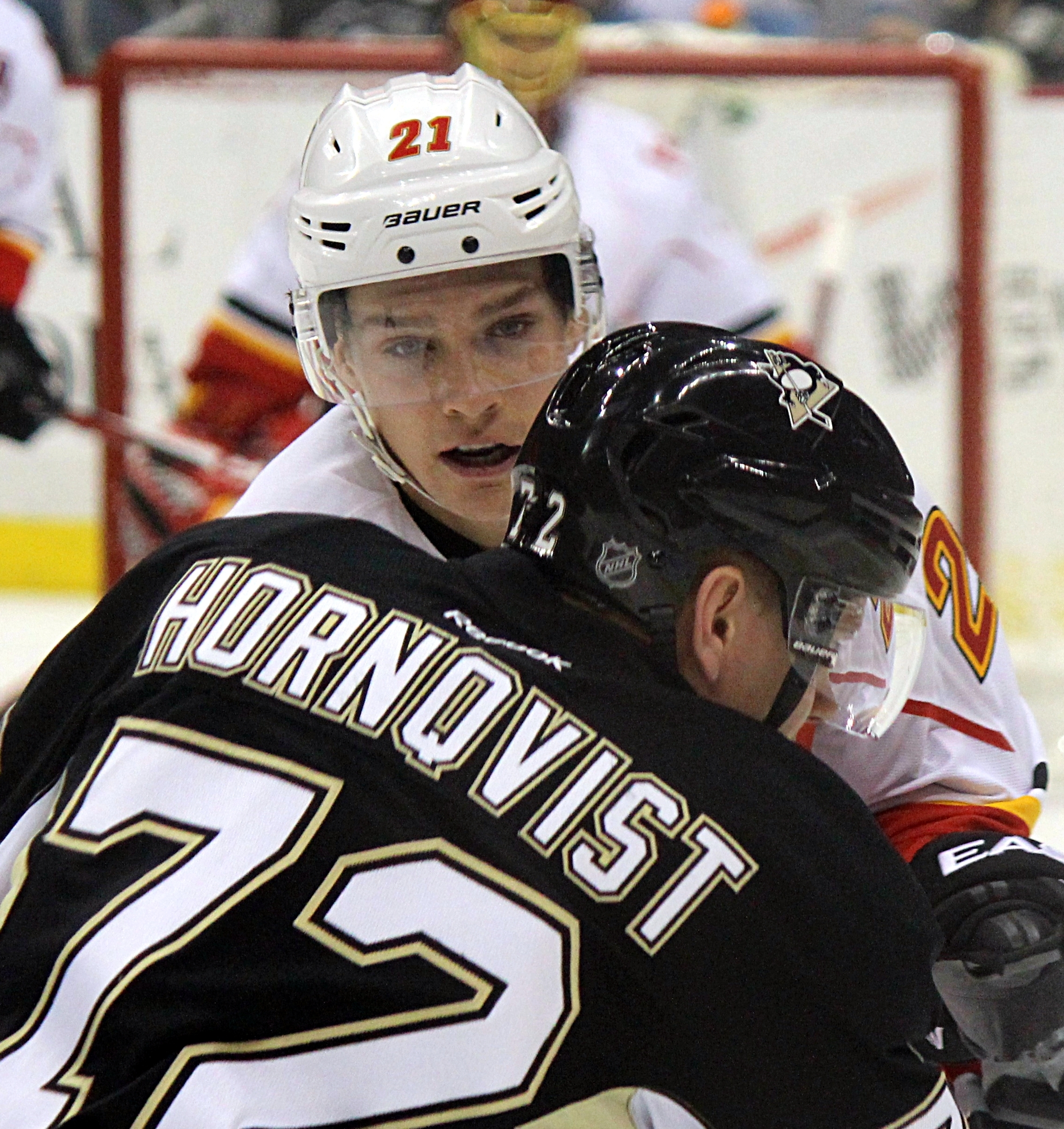
Raymond defends against Patric Hörnqvist of the Penguins during a game in December 2014.

The Calgary Flames declined an opportunity to sign Raymond when he was a free agent in the previous off-season, but the departure of Michael Cammalleri in free agency on July 1, 2014, left the team in need of a veteran forward. Calgary signed Raymond to a three-year contract worth $9.5 million the same day. On October 9, the second game of the 2014–15 season, Raymond scored the 100th goal of his NHL career as part of this third career hat trick to lead the Flames to a 5–2 victory over the Edmonton Oilers. On March 14, 2015, Raymond played in his 500th NHL game in a 3–2 loss to the Colorado Avalanche. Raymond ended the season with 12 goals and 11 assists for 23 points in 57 contests as the Flames qualified for the playoffs for the first time since 2009. In the 2015 playoffs, Raymond was held goalless but recorded two assists for two points in eight of the 11 playoff games as the Flames defeated Raymond's former team, the Vancouver Canucks in six games before getting defeated by the top-seeded Anaheim Ducks in five games in the second round.

On the eve of the 2015–16 season, Raymond was placed on waivers, for the purpose of being sent down to the AHL. He cleared the following day and was assigned to the Stockton Heat. During the season, Raymond appeared in 29 games with the Flames, contributing with five points (four goals, one assist). Despite producing at a point-per-game in the AHL with Stockton, at the conclusion of the year, Raymond was placed on waivers by the Flames on June 29, 2016, and was bought-out from the final year of his contract the following day.

=== Anaheim Ducks (2016–2017) ===
On July 4, 2016, Raymond signed a one-year contract as a free agent with the Anaheim Ducks, reuniting with former Canuck teammates Ryan Kesler and Kevin Bieksa. After making the Ducks opening night roster for the 2016–17 season, Raymond appeared in four scoreless games in a depth role before he was reassigned to AHL affiliate, the San Diego Gulls. In declining to report to the Gulls, Raymond and the Ducks mutually agreed to terminate the remainder of his contract on November 3. In an interview with SportsNet on January 3, 2017, Raymond revealed that he refused to report to the AHL largely to spend time with his wife, who had been diagnosed with Lyme disease.

=== SC Bern (2017–2018) ===
On June 16, 2017, Raymond agreed to a one-year contract with SC Bern of the National League (NL).

== International play ==
Medal record

Men's Ice hockey

Representing Canada

Olympic Games
Bronze medal – third place	2018 Pyeongchang	

Spengler Cup
Gold medal – first place	2016 Davos	

Following his 2010 playoff run with the Canucks, Raymond was added to Team Canada's roster for the 2010 IIHF World Championship in Germany, his first international tournament. Joining the team midway through the tournament during the qualification round, he recorded his lone point of the tournament, an assist, on a goal by Matt Duchene during a 3–2 loss to the Czech Republic. The following game, Canada was eliminated in the quarterfinal by Russia, losing the game 5–2. Raymond also played in the 2016 Spengler Cup, recording 7 points in 5 games for Team Canada, who won the tournament.

== Personal life ==
Raymond was born in Cochrane, Alberta, a town west of Calgary, to parents Carol and Terry Raymond. He began skating when he was four on his family's backyard rink. Growing up, he was a Calgary Flames fan. He left home as a teenager for the 2003–04 season to play Junior A with the Camrose Kodiaks in Camrose, Alberta.

Raymond married Megan (née Murray) in the summer of 2008. Megan gave birth to their first child on April 8, 2012, and their second child in February 2015.

Following his retirement, he returned to Cochrane where he is president of a GM vehicle dealership.

== Career statistics ==
=== Regular season and playoffs ===
			Regular season					Playoffs
Season	Team	League	GP	G	A	Pts	PIM	GP	G	A	Pts	PIM
2001–02	Airdrie Extreme AAA	AMBHL	39	15	26	41	12	—	—	—	—	—
2002–03	UFA Bisons AAA	AMHL	33	14	26	40	49	9	11	9	20
2003–04	Camrose Kodiaks	AJHL	57	27	35	62	32	—	—	—	—	—
2004–05	Camrose Kodiaks	AJHL	55	41	41	82	80	15	8	12	20	—
2005–06	University of Minnesota Duluth	WCHA	40	11	17	28	30	—	—	—	—	—
2006–07	University of Minnesota Duluth	WCHA	39	14	32	46	45	—	—	—	—	—
2006–07	Manitoba Moose	AHL	11	2	2	4	6	13	0	1	1	0
2007–08	Manitoba Moose	AHL	20	7	10	17	6	—	—	—	—	—
2007–08	Vancouver Canucks	NHL	49	9	12	21	2	—	—	—	—	—
2008–09	Vancouver Canucks	NHL	72	11	12	23	24	10	2	1	3	2
2009–10	Vancouver Canucks	NHL	82	25	28	53	48	12	3	1	4	6
2010–11	Vancouver Canucks	NHL	70	15	24	39	10	24	2	6	8	6
2011–12	Vancouver Canucks	NHL	55	10	10	20	18	5	0	1	1	0
2012–13	Örebro HK	Allsv	2	0	1	1	2	—	—	—	—	—
2012–13	Vancouver Canucks	NHL	46	10	12	22	16	4	1	1	2	0
2013–14	Toronto Maple Leafs	NHL	82	19	26	45	22	—	—	—	—	—
2014–15	Calgary Flames	NHL	57	12	11	23	8	8	0	2	2	0
2015–16	Calgary Flames	NHL	29	4	1	5	8	—	—	—	—	—
2015–16	Stockton Heat	AHL	15	6	9	15	2	—	—	—	—	—
2016–17	Anaheim Ducks	NHL	4	0	0	0	0	—	—	—	—	—
2017–18	SC Bern	NL	35	17	18	35	6	5	2	2	4	0
NHL totals			546	115	136	251	156	63	8	12	20	14

=== International ===
Year	Team	Event	Result	GP	G	A	Pts	PIM
2010	Canada	WC	7th	3	0	1	1	0
2016	Canada	SC	1st place, gold medalist(s)	5	3	3	6	2
2017	Canada	SC	4	1	0	1	2
2018	Canada	OG	3rd place, bronze medalist(s)	6	1	1	2	6
Senior totals				14	4	5	9	8

== Awards and honours ==
=== AJHL ===
Award	Year
Old Time Hockey Players’	2005
Rogers Wireless Cup (with Camrose Kodiaks)	2005
Doyle Cup (with Camrose Kodiaks)	2005

=== NCAA ===
Award	Year
All-WCHA Rookie Team	2005–06
All-WCHA First Team	2006–07

=== University of Minnesota-Duluth team awards ===
Award	Year
Mike Seiler Award	2007

=== Vancouver Canucks team awards ===
Award	Year
Fred J. Hume Award	2010
