= Monya =

Monya may refer to:

- Sergei Monia (alternate spelling: Sergey Monya) (born 1983), Russian professional basketball player
- Dmitri Monya (born 1988), Russian professional ice hockey winger
- Monya (character), character in comic album series Yoko Tsuno
