= Chris Kelly (ice hockey) =

Canadian player and coach (born 1980)

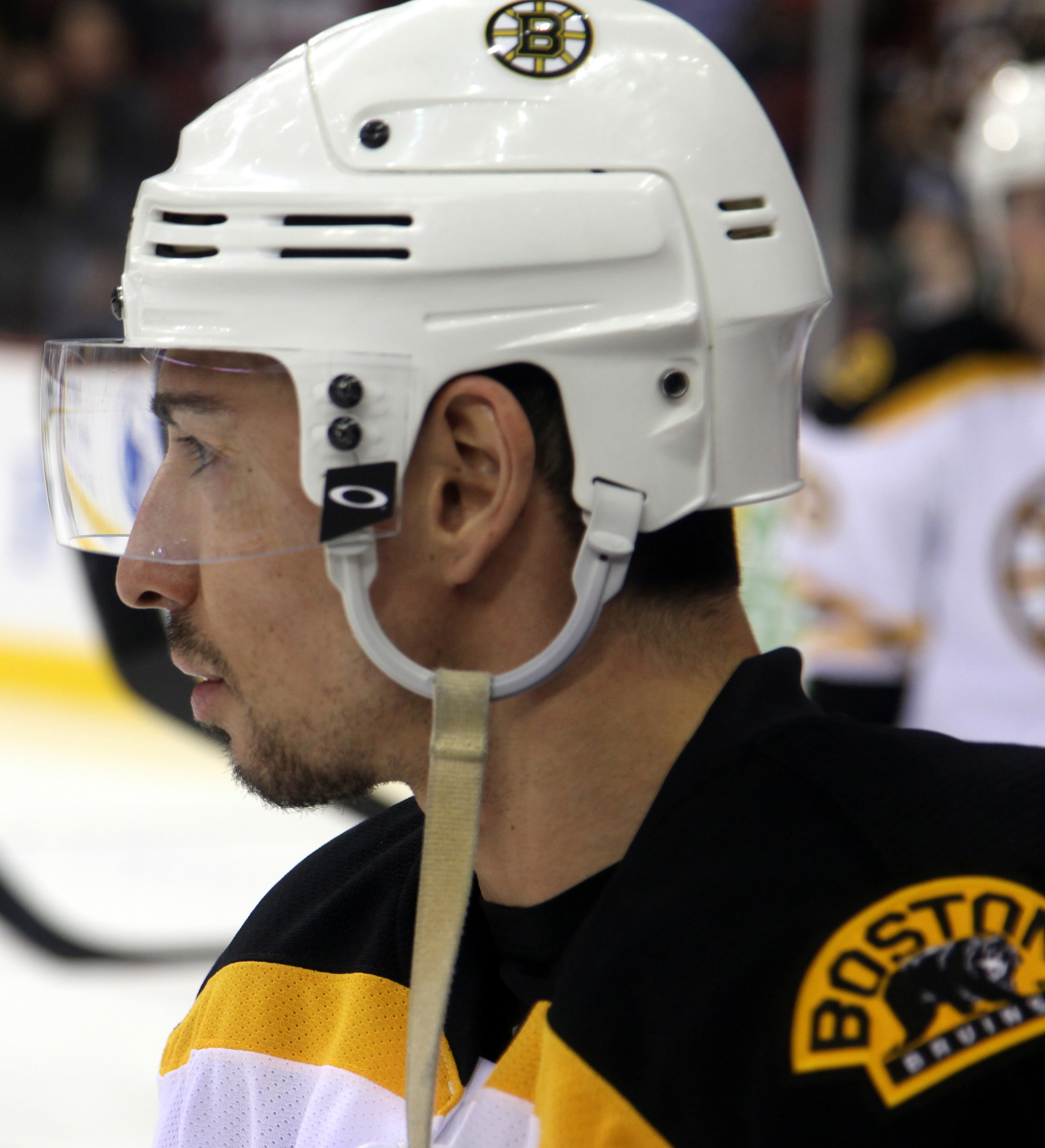
- Kelly with the Boston Bruins in 2013
- Born: November 11, 1980 (age 45) Toronto, Ontario, Canada
- Height: 6 ft 0 in (183 cm)
- Weight: 198 lb (90 kg; 14 st 2 lb)
- Position: Center/Left wing
- Shot: Left
- Played for: Ottawa Senators; Boston Bruins; Anaheim Ducks
- National team: Canada
- NHL draft: 94th overall, 1999; Ottawa Senators
- Playing career: 2001–2018
- Coaching career: 2021–present

Christopher Kelly (born November 11, 1980) is a Canadian professional ice hockey coach and former player. Kelly played for the Ottawa Senators, Boston Bruins and Anaheim Ducks of the National Hockey League (NHL). He was a member of the Bruins' 2011 Stanley Cup-winning team. He is currently an assistant coach for the Bruins.

He won gold with Team Canada at the 2017 Spengler Cup. In the 2018 Winter Olympics, Kelly represented Canada as captain of the men's ice hockey team, leading the team to a bronze medal.

== Playing career ==
=== Amateur ===
Kelly was born in Toronto and grew up one hour east of the city in Bowmanville. He started playing in the Bowmanville Recreational Hockey League and with the Bowmanville Toros AA program. He played in the 1994 Quebec International Pee-Wee Hockey Tournament with the Toronto Marlboros minor ice hockey team. For one year, he played for the OHA Jr. A. hockey with the Aurora Tigers. Kelly was then selected in the fourth round, 56th overall, by the Ontario Hockey League (OHL)'s London Knights in the 1997 OHL Priority Selection.

At the major junior level, Kelly played for both the Knights and the Sudbury Wolves. In 1998–99, he scored 36 goals, his career-high scoring mark in the OHL. He also played for the Team Orr in the mid-season at the CHL Top Prospects Game. In the OHL playoffs, he scored nine goals and 26 points in 25 games as the Knights reached the OHL Final.

=== Professional ===
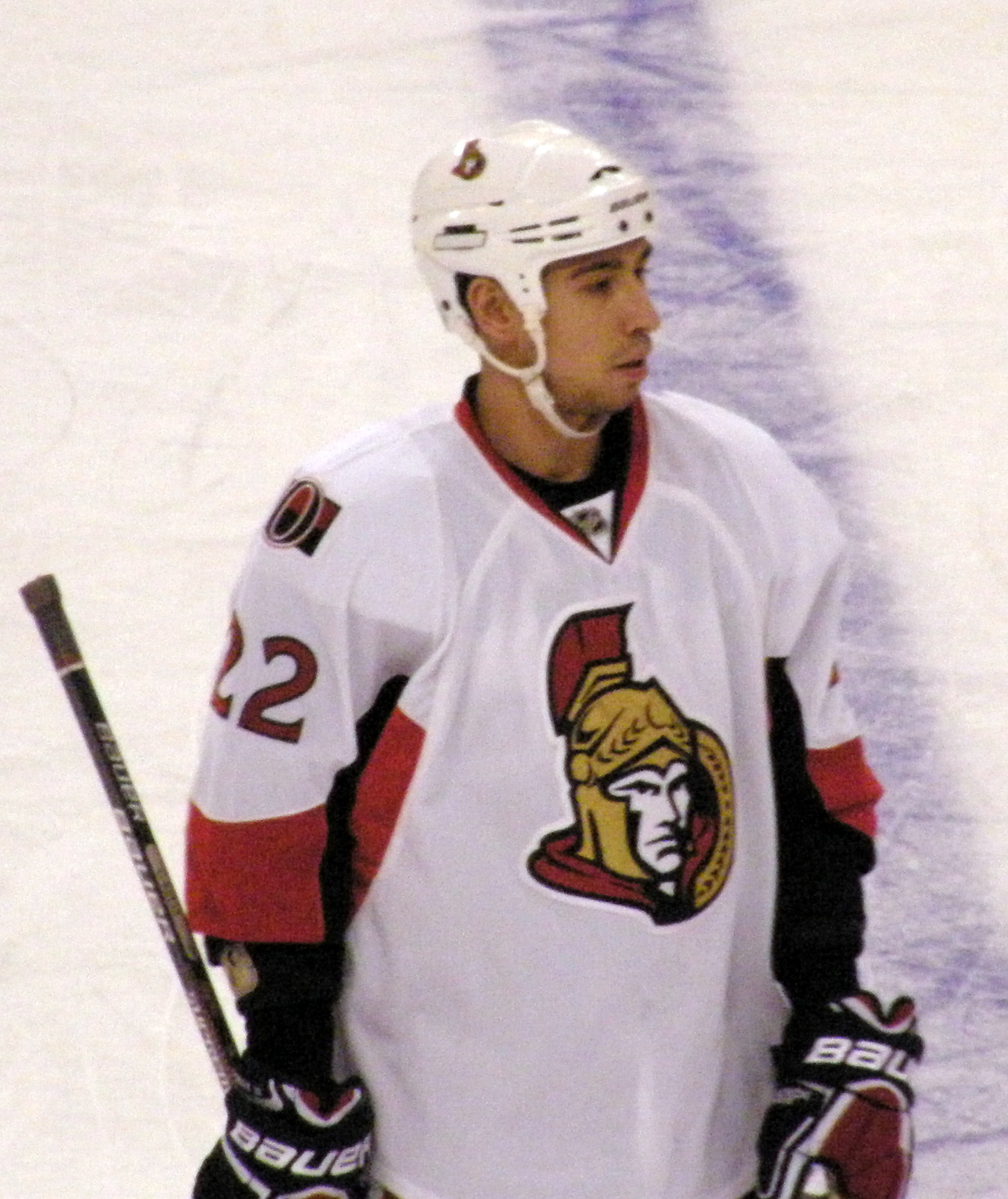
Kelly in 2009 as a member of the Ottawa Senators.

==== Ottawa Senators ====
Kelly was drafted 94th overall by the Ottawa Senators in the 1999 NHL entry draft. He spent one year in the American Hockey League (AHL) with the Grand Rapids Griffins and three seasons in the same league with the Binghamton Senators. He also played with the Muskegon Fury (of the UHL) for four games (recovering from an injury). In 2004–05, he had finished fifth in the AHL in plus-minus with +30. He also finished fifth on Binghamton with 60 points, as the team finished fourth overall in the League. When he was a professional rookie in 2001–02, he helped the Griffins finish fourth in the AHL. In his two final seasons in Binghamton, Kelly served as team captain.

Kelly made his NHL debut on February 5, 2004, in a match against the Toronto Maple Leafs, one of four games he appeared in with Ottawa during 2003–04. In his rookie season of 2005–06, he became a regular in Ottawa's line-up, appearing in all of the team's 82 games and registering 30 points whilst playing in a checking role. The following season, he was a member of the Senators team that advanced to the 2007 Stanley Cup Final.

On July 31, 2007, he re-signed with the Senators to a one-year contract worth $1.263 million. Kelly was set to become an unrestricted free agent on July 1, 2008, but again re-signed with the Senators on a four-year contract extension worth $8.5 million on June 20, 2008.

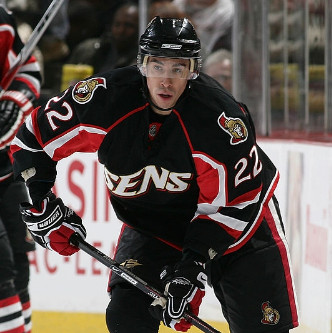
Kelly during his 300th game with the Senators.

==== Boston Bruins ====
As part of a rebuilding process undertaken by the Senators as the 2010–11 season was concluding, Kelly was traded to the Boston Bruins on February 15, 2011, for a second-round draft pick in 2011; Ottawa later used the pick to select forward Shane Prince. Kelly and the Boston Bruins won the Stanley Cup, defeating the Vancouver Canucks.

On April 12, 2012, Kelly scored the game-winning goal in overtime in game one of the Eastern Conference Quarterfinal series against the Washington Capitals; the Bruins ultimately lost the series in seven games.

A pending unrestricted free agent as the 2011–12 season wrapped up, Kelly was rumoured to be returning to the Senators, though he ended up re-signing with the Bruins on June 11, 2012, agreeing to a four-year, $12 million contract. The deal, however, was quickly rejected by the NHL due to what then-Bruins General Manager Peter Chiarelli referred to as "payroll tagging issues." Kelly stayed with the Bruins, and played in the 2013 Stanley Cup Final.

As the 2013–14 season began on October 3, 2013, with a home game against the Tampa Bay Lightning, Kelly had his first-ever chance at a penalty shot in his NHL career in the first period of the game; he converted the penalty shot, scoring the first Bruins goal of the season against goaltender Anders Lindbäck while the Bruins were in a short-handed situation en route to an eventual 3–1 home victory. The goal marked the first time in NHL history that a team scored its first goal of the season via a penalty shot.

In his sixth year with the Bruins in the 2015–16 season, and in the final year of his contract, Kelly began the campaign leading the Bruins penalty-kill. Kelly scored 2 goals in 11 games before on November 3, 2015, he buckled his left leg on the ice and broke his left femur in a game against the Dallas Stars. He was announced to have undergone surgery the following day and was scheduled to have a 6-8 month recovery period, which effectively ruled him out for the season.

==== Return to Ottawa ====
As a free agent following his recovery from his broken leg with the Bruins, Kelly signed a one-year contract to return to the Ottawa Senators on July 7, 2016. In the 2016–17 season, Kelly appeared in all 82 games for the club, scoring 12 points.

==== Later career and Anaheim Ducks ====
At the conclusion of his contract, Kelly was not re-signed by the Senators, making him an unrestricted free agent. Unsigned over the summer, the Edmonton Oilers signed Kelly to a professional tryout on September 9, 2017. Kelly attended the Oilers training camp and pre-season and remained with the club to start the 2017–18 season. Despite practicing with the team, Kelly was not offered a contract with the Oilers, and on November 24, 2017, he returned within the Senators organization by signing a professional tryout deal with new AHL affiliate, the Belleville Senators.

On January 9, 2018, following his performance with Team Canada at the Spengler Cup, Kelly was re-signed to a professional tryout agreement with the Belleville Senators.

At the conclusion of the Olympics, Kelly returned to the NHL in agreeing to a one-year, $1.25 million contract for the remainder of the season with the Anaheim Ducks on February 25, 2018. He appeared in just 12 games to play out the regular season, posting two assists.

== Coaching career ==
On September 4, 2018, Kelly was hired by the Senators as a development coach, effectively ending his playing career. Kelly joined former Senators' teammate Shean Donovan in overseeing and supporting the development of prospects throughout the Ottawa system.

On July 18, 2019, Kelly was hired by the Boston Bruins as a player development coordinator. Prior to the 2021–22 season, the Bruins announced that Kelly had moved into an assistant coaching position with the Bruins.

== International play ==
Medal record

Representing Canada

Ice hockey

Olympic Games
Bronze medal – third place	2018 Pyeongchang	

=== Spengler Cup ===
On December 20, 2017, Kelly was released from his professional tryout agreement with the Belleville Senators to join Team Canada for the 2017 Spengler Cup, which they won. He rejoined the Senators immediately following the tournament.

=== Olympics ===
On January 11, 2018, Kelly was named to Team Canada for the 2018 Winter Olympics. He was named team captain on February 8, 2018. Kelly and Team Canada won the bronze medal, defeating the Czech Republic 6–4.

== Personal life ==
Kelly married during the summer of 2008 in Mexico. He met his wife Krissy Broderick while attending Saunders Secondary School as a member of the London Knights as a teenager. Broderick now teaches elementary school in Ottawa.

== Career statistics ==
=== Regular season and playoffs ===
			Regular season					Playoffs
Season	Team	League	GP	G	A	Pts	PIM	GP	G	A	Pts	PIM
1995–96	Toronto Marlboros AAA	MTHL	42	25	45	70	25	—	—	—	—	—
1996–97	Aurora Tigers	MetJHL	49	14	20	34	11	—	—	—	—	—
1996–97	Vaughan Vipers	OPJHL	5	0	0	0	5	—	—	—	—	—
1997–98	London Knights	OHL	54	15	14	29	4	16	4	5	9	12
1998–99	London Knights	OHL	68	36	41	77	60	25	9	17	26	22
1999–00	London Knights	OHL	63	29	43	72	57	—	—	—	—	—
2000–01	London Knights	OHL	31	21	34	55	46	—	—	—	—	—
2000–01	Sudbury Wolves	OHL	19	5	16	21	17	12	11	5	16	14
2001–02	Muskegon Fury	UHL	4	1	2	3	0	—	—	—	—	—
2001–02	Grand Rapids Griffins	AHL	31	3	3	6	20	5	1	1	2	5
2002–03	Binghamton Senators	AHL	77	17	14	31	73	14	2	3	5	8
2003–04	Binghamton Senators	AHL	54	15	19	34	40	2	0	0	0	4
2003–04	Ottawa Senators	NHL	4	0	0	0	0	—	—	—	—	—
2004–05	Binghamton Senators	AHL	77	24	36	60	57	6	1	2	3	1
2005–06	Ottawa Senators	NHL	82	10	20	30	76	10	0	0	0	0
2006–07	Ottawa Senators	NHL	82	15	23	38	40	20	3	4	7	4
2007–08	Ottawa Senators	NHL	75	11	19	30	30	—	—	—	—	—
2008–09	Ottawa Senators	NHL	82	12	11	23	38	—	—	—	—	—
2009–10	Ottawa Senators	NHL	81	15	17	32	38	6	1	5	6	2
2010–11	Ottawa Senators	NHL	57	12	11	23	27	—	—	—	—	—
2010–11	Boston Bruins	NHL	24	2	3	5	6	25	5	8	13	6
2011–12	Boston Bruins	NHL	82	20	19	39	41	7	1	2	3	4
2012–13	HC Red Ice	NLB	8	4	5	9	8	—	—	—	—	—
2012–13	Boston Bruins	NHL	34	3	6	9	16	22	2	1	3	19
2013–14	Boston Bruins	NHL	57	9	9	18	32	—	—	—	—	—
2014–15	Boston Bruins	NHL	80	7	21	28	48	—	—	—	—	—
2015–16	Boston Bruins	NHL	11	2	0	2	0	—	—	—	—	—
2016–17	Ottawa Senators	NHL	82	5	7	12	23	2	0	0	0	0
2017–18	Belleville Senators	AHL	16	0	2	2	10	—	—	—	—	—
2017–18	Anaheim Ducks	NHL	12	0	2	2	2	—	—	—	—	—
NHL totals			845	123	168	291	417	92	12	20	32	37

=== International ===
Year	Team	Event	Result	GP	G	A	Pts	PIM
2018	Canada	OG	3rd place, bronze medalist(s)	6	2	1	3	0
Senior totals				6	2	1	3	0
