= Gilles Senn =

Swiss ice hockey player

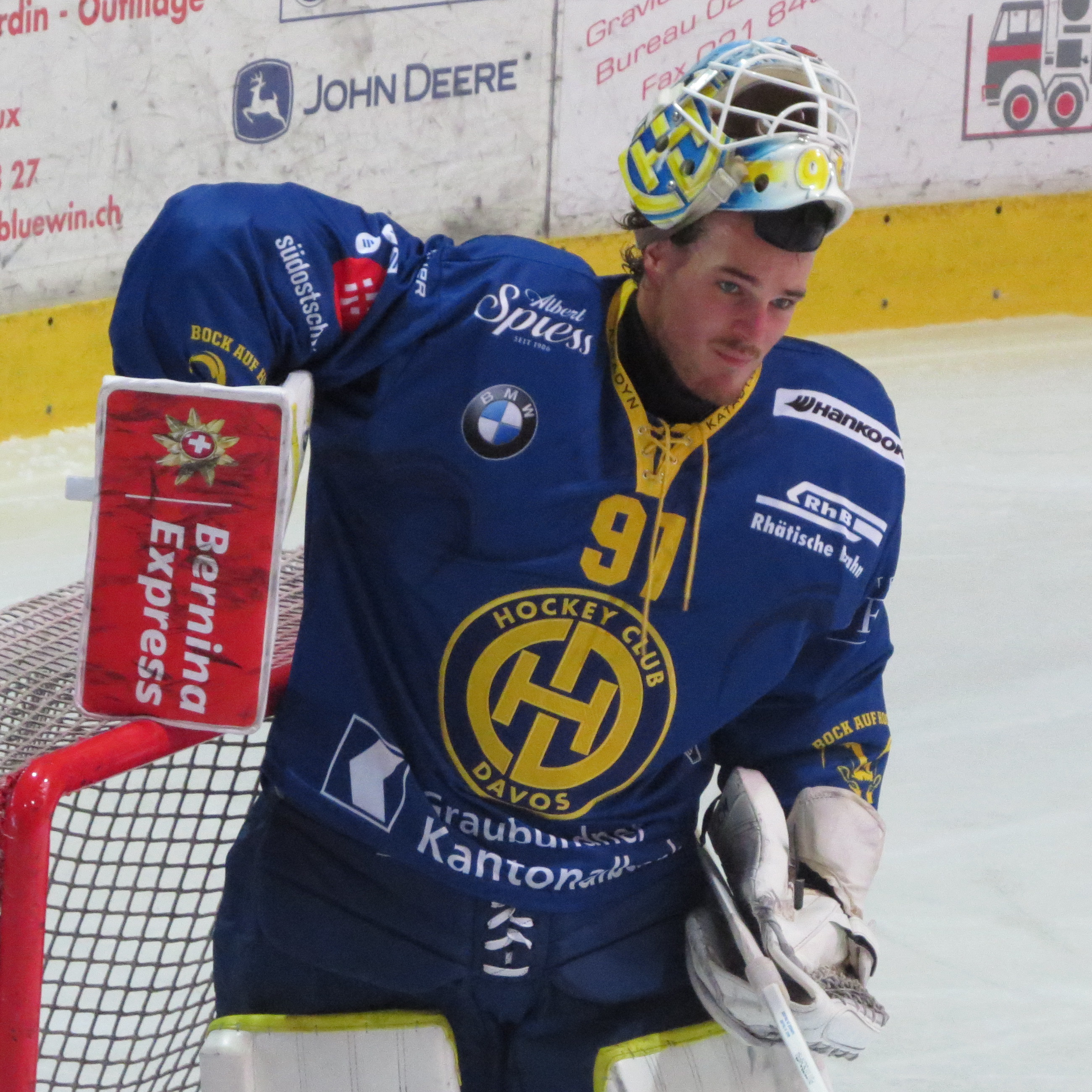
- Senn with HC Davos in 2018
- Born: 1 March 1996 (age 30) Visp, Switzerland
- Height: 6 ft 5 in (196 cm)
- Weight: 191 lb (87 kg; 13 st 9 lb)
- Position: Goaltender
- Catches: Left
- NL team Former teams: HC Ambrì-Piotta; HC Davos; New Jersey Devils
- National team: Switzerland
- NHL draft: 129th overall, 2017; New Jersey Devils
- Playing career: 2015–present

Gilles Senn (born 1 March 1996) is a Swiss professional ice hockey goaltender for HC Ambrì-Piotta of the National League (NL). Senn was selected by the New Jersey Devils in the 2017 NHL entry draft, he moved to North America in 2019, mainly playing with New Jersey's American Hockey League affiliate. He made his NHL debut that year, playing two games for the Devils. Internationally Senn has been named to the Swiss national team for several tournaments, but has not played in any games.

== Playing career ==
As a child, Senn was encouraged to play hockey after watching his brother train with Visp. He alternated between forward, defence, and goalie, before eventually settling for goaltender. While growing up in Switzerland, he had limited exposure to the National Hockey League but as he grew older, he began to idolize NHL goaltenders David Aebischer and Martin Gerber. At the age of 16, Senn left the Visp U17 for Davos U17 to combine school and sport. He finished Gymnasium with a high school diploma while continuing to play hockey.

Senn helped lead HC Davos to the semi-finals of the 2016 Spengler Cup with a 3–1 win over the Avtomobilist Ekaterinburg. After the 2016–17 season, Davos lost their starting goaltender Leonardo Genoni to SC Bern, which promoted Senn to their starter the following season. He worked alongside his backup Joren van Pottelberghe to help lead HC Davos to the semi-finals, before eventually losing 5–3. Senn played a career high 34 games during the regular season and posted a .910 save percentage.

Despite the loss in the semi-finals, Senn's performance impressed the New Jersey Devils who drafted him 129th overall in the 2017 NHL entry draft. In August 2017, he was the recipient of the NLA's Youngster of the Year Award.

On 17 April 2019, Senn signed a two-year, entry-level contract with the New Jersey Devils. Later that year, he attended the Devils' development camp at the Prudential Center. After attending the Devils' training camp, he was reassigned to their American Hockey League (AHL) affiliate the Binghamton Devils. Senn eventually made his AHL debut with the Binghamton Devils on 12 October in a 5–4 overtime loss to the Belleville Senators. After posting a .89 save percentage, he was reassigned to their ECHL affiliate the Adirondack Thunder on 23 November, but was recalled before he could play a game. On 20 December, Senn made his NHL debut when he replaced Mackenzie Blackwood in the third period. He made two saves and allowed one goal as the Devils lost 5–2 against the Washington Capitals. In the next game, on 21 December, Senn made his first NHL start, making 35 saves and allowing three goals in a 5–1 loss to the Columbus Blue Jackets.

After two seasons playing within the Devils' organization, Senn as a restricted free agent, opted to return to Switzerland and sign a three-year contract with original club, HC Davos, on 27 May 2021.

Nearing the conclusion of his contract with Davos, Senn opted to sign an initial two-year contract with fellow Swiss club, HC Ambrì-Piotta, on 29 November 2023. In the midst of his first season with Ambrì-Piotta in 2024–25, Senn was signed to a two-year contract extension on 21 November 2024, taking him under contract with the club through to 2028.

== International play ==
Medal record

Representing Switzerland

Ice Hockey

World Championships
Silver medal – second place	2018 Denmark	

During the 2017–18 season, Senn was selected as the third goaltender for Team Switzerland during the 2018 IIHF World Championship, behind Genoni and Reto Berra. He played in four exhibition games and recorded a 2.55 goals against average and .914 save percentage. As a member of Team Switzerland, he earned a silver medal after a loss in the gold medal game to Sweden.

== Career statistics ==
=== Regular season and playoffs ===
			Regular season									Playoffs
Season	Team	League	GP	W	L	OTL	MIN	GA	SO	GAA	SV%	GP	W	L	MIN	GA	SO	GAA	SV%
2012–13	HC Davos	Elite Jr. A	8	—	—	—	—	—	—	3.43	—	3	—	—	—	—	—	4.75	—
2013–14	HC Davos	Elite Jr. A	34	—	—	—	—	—	—	2.76	—	3	—	—	—	—	—	5.00	—
2014–15	HC Davos	Elite Jr. A	32	17	9	2	1,862	76	3	2.52	—	9	5	3	568	22	1	2.33	—
2014–15	HC Davos	NLA	4	1	0	0	85	3	0	2.11	.917	—	—	—	—	—	—	—	—
2015–16	HC Davos	Elite Jr. A	16	8	5	1	838	45	0	3.22	—	—	—	—	—	—	—	—	—
2015–16	HC Davos	NLA	6	1	2	0	234	15	0	3.84	.883	—	—	—	—	—	—	—	—
2016–17	HC Davos	NLA	34	16	14	3	2,000	88	1	2.64	.917	10	6	4	639	29	0	2.72	.897
2017–18	HC Davos	NL	30	12	10	1	1,748	85	1	2.92	.905	6	2	4	358	19	0	3.19	.894
2018–19	HC Davos	NL	20	4	15	0	1,167	62	0	3.19	.901	—	—	—	—	—	—	—	—
2019–20	Binghamton Devils	AHL	27	17	7	2	1,605	74	1	2.77	.901	—	—	—	—	—	—	—	—
2019–20	New Jersey Devils	NHL	2	0	1	0	70	4	0	3.42	.902	—	—	—	—	—	—	—	—
2020–21	Binghamton Devils	AHL	17	3	10	2	943	56	0	3.56	.895	—	—	—	—	—	—	—	—
2021–22	HC Davos	NL	21	7	10	1	1,106	63	0	3.42	.896	—	—	—	—	—	—	—	—
2022–23	HC Davos	NL	17	7	5	1	991	37	3	2.24	.922	—	—	—	—	—	—	—	—
2023–24	HC Davos	NL	15	5	8	2	839	42	0	3.01	.903	1	0	0	30	0	0	0.00	1.000
2024–25	HC Ambrì-Piotta	NL	31	16	10	0	1,771	83	2	2.81	.907	2	0	2	79	6	0	4.58	.838
NL totals			178	69	74	8	9,941	478	7	2.88	.906	19	8	10	1,106	54	0	2.97	.894
NHL totals			2	0	1	0	70	4	0	3.42	.902	—	—	—	—	—	—	—	—
