= Andrew Ebbett =

Canadian ice hockey player (born 1983)

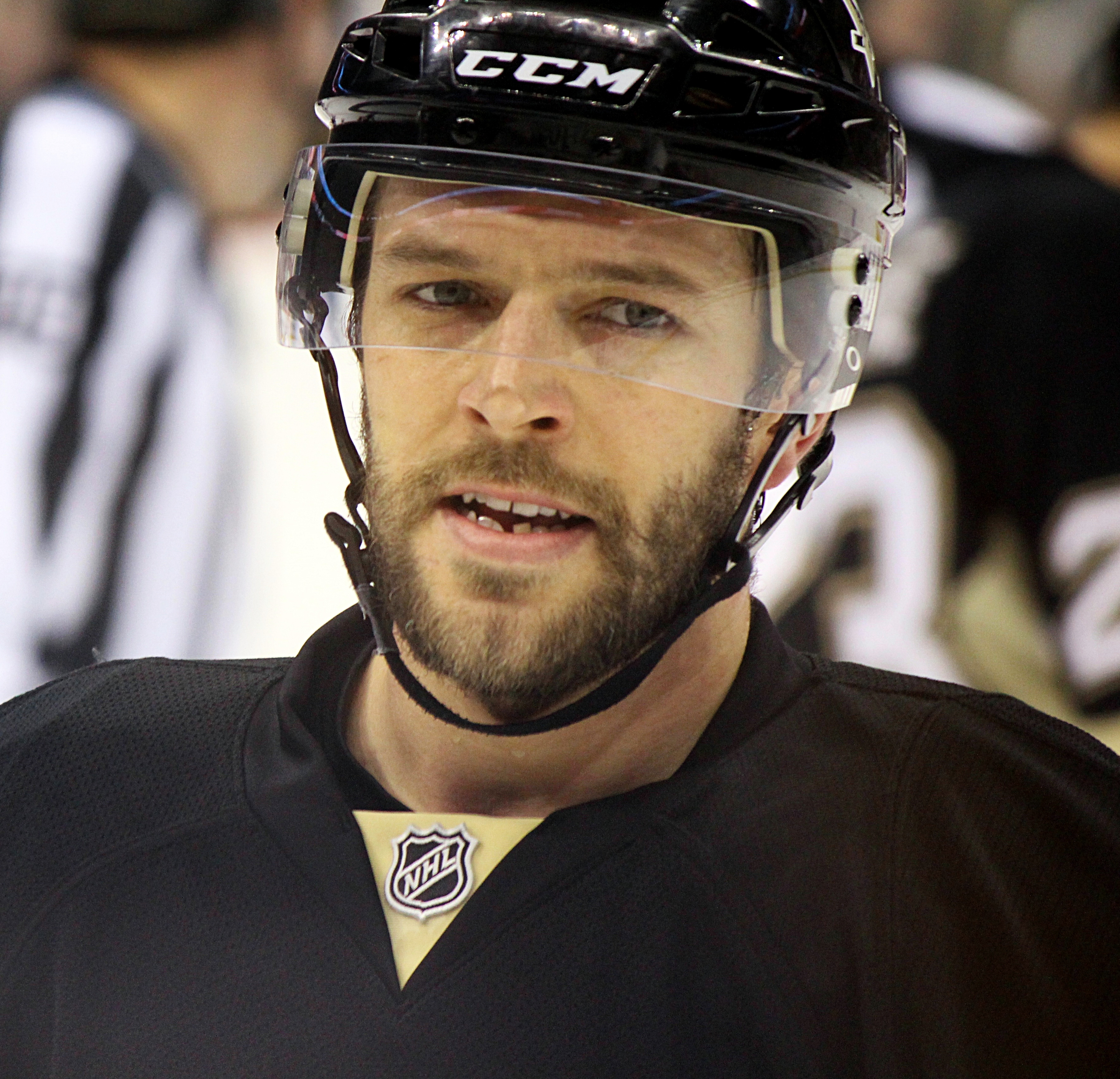
- Born: January 2, 1983 (age 43) Vernon, British Columbia, Canada
- Height: 5 ft 9 in (175 cm)
- Weight: 172 lb (78 kg; 12 st 4 lb)
- Position: Centre
- Shot: Left
- Played for: Anaheim Ducks; Chicago Blackhawks; Minnesota Wild; Phoenix Coyotes; Vancouver Canucks; Pittsburgh Penguins; SC Bern; EHC München
- National team: Canada
- NHL draft: Undrafted
- Playing career: 2006–2021

Andrew Ebbett (born January 2, 1983) is a Canadian former professional ice hockey centre. He currently serves as general manager of SC Bern.

Internationally, Ebbett has represented Team Canada at the 2016 and 2017 Spengler Cup, and won bronze at the 2018 Winter Olympics.

== Playing career ==
Ebbett played collegiate hockey with the University of Michigan of the CCHA, captaining the Wolverines in his senior year. Undrafted, he was signed as a free agent by the Ottawa Senators on July 17, 2006. He then made his professional debut in the 2006–07 season with Ottawa's affiliate, the Binghamton Senators of the AHL.

The Anaheim Ducks signed Ebbett on May 16, 2007, assigning him to their affiliate, the Portland Pirates of the AHL. Ebbett made his NHL debut in the 2007–08 season with the Ducks, playing in 3 games. On June 11, 2008, the Ducks re-signed him to a two-year contract extension.

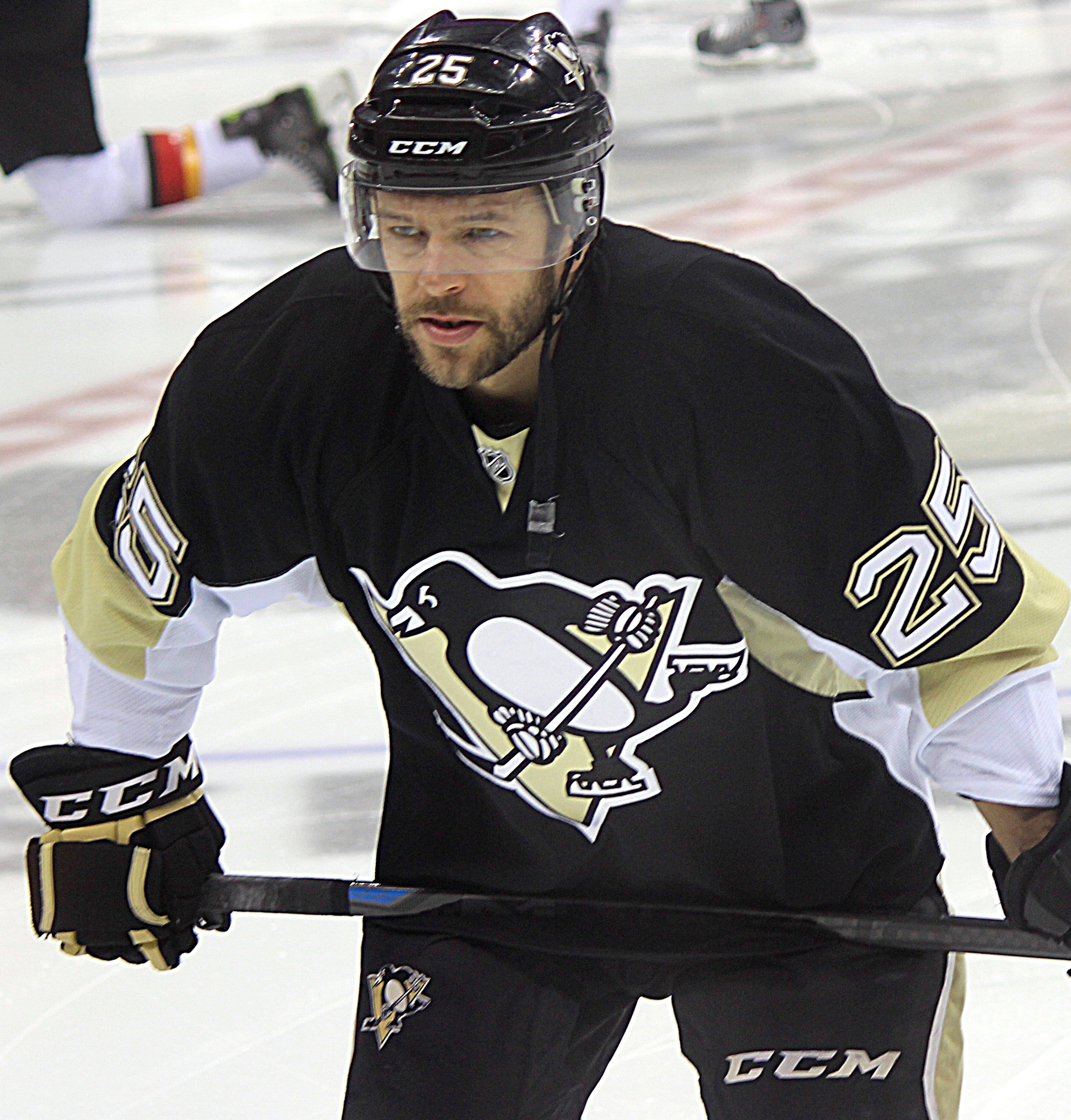
Ebbett during this time with the Pittsburgh Penguins.

In the 2008–09 season, Ebbett began the year with affiliate, the Iowa Chops. After 28 games with the Chops, he was recalled and scored his first NHL goal against the Philadelphia Flyers on January 2, 2009, on his 26th birthday. Ebbett registered 32 points in only 48 games, helping the Ducks to the second round, when he scored his first Stanley Cup playoff goal in the upset of the San Jose Sharks on April 19, 2009.

Ebbett played 2 games with the Ducks in 2009–10 before the Chicago Blackhawks claimed him off waivers on October 17, 2009. Unable to find a role on the Blackhawks roster, Ebbett was waived after 10 games and acquired by the Minnesota Wild on November 21, 2009. He settled quickly, scoring a goal in his first game with the Wild against the Boston Bruins on November 25, 2009. Ebbett remained with Minnesota until the end of the season, posting 8 goals for 14 points in 49 games.

On July 2, 2010, Ebbett joined his fourth team in less than a year when he signed as a free agent to a one-year deal with the Phoenix Coyotes.

On July 1, 2011, he signed a one-year contract worth $525,000 with the Vancouver Canucks.

On July 2, 2012, Ebbett signed a one-year, two-way contract with the Vancouver Canucks that paid him $600,000 at the NHL level and $300,000 at the AHL level.

On July 5, 2013, Ebbett signed a two-year, two-way contract with the Pittsburgh Penguins that paid him $1.1 million at the NHL level.

As an impending free agent following the 2014–15 season with the Penguins, Ebbett signed his first contract abroad in agreeing to a two-year contract with Swiss club, SC Bern of the National League A (NLA) on June 24, 2015. He helped Bern win the 2016 Swiss championship, scoring five goals and ten assists in 14 playoff contests. In the regular season, he had seen the ice 19 times with four goals and nine assists. In October 2015, Ebbett fractured his tibial plateau and was sidelined for three months. In December 2016, he won the Spengler Cup with Team Canada and was named to the tournament's all-star team. In January 2017, he signed a contract extension with Bern that would keep him with the team until 2019. In the 2016–17 season, he won his second Swiss Championship with Bern. On January 3, 2019, he was signed to an early two-year contract extension by SC Bern through the 2020–21 season. During the 2018–19 season, Ebbett won his third Swiss Championship in four years, posting 11 points in 18 post-season games. On March 18, 2020, Ebbett was released by SC Bern, despite a valid contract for the 2020–21 season.

On February 8, 2021, Ebbett returned to the professional circuit after belatedly signing a contract for the remainder of the 2020–21 season with German club, EHC München of the DEL. He officially retired from professional hockey at the end of the season.

== Executive career ==
On May 26, 2021, Ebbett was named the general manager of former club, SC Bern of the NL.

== International play ==
Medal record

Representing Canada

Ice hockey

Olympic Games
Bronze medal – third place	2018 Pyeongchang	

Ebbett was first selected to represent Team Canada at the 2016 and 2017 Spengler Cup.

During the 2017–18 season, Ebbett was selected to represent Canada at the 2018 Winter Olympics in Pyeongchang, South Korea. Later announced as an alternate captain, Ebbett recorded three points in five games to help Canada win bronze.

== Career statistics ==
=== Regular season and playoffs ===
			Regular season					Playoffs
Season	Team	League	GP	G	A	Pts	PIM	GP	G	A	Pts	PIM
2000–01	Sicamous Eagles	KIJHL	51	54	50	104	55	—	—	—	—	—
2001–02	Prince George Spruce Kings	BCHL	2	0	0	0	0	—	—	—	—	—
2001–02	Salmon Arm Silverbacks	BCHL	60	45	39	84	54	—	—	—	—	—
2002–03	University of Michigan	CCHA	43	9	18	27	22	—	—	—	—	—
2003–04	University of Michigan	CCHA	43	9	28	37	56	—	—	—	—	—
2004–05	University of Michigan	CCHA	40	6	31	37	28	—	—	—	—	—
2005–06	University of Michigan	CCHA	41	14	28	42	25	—	—	—	—	—
2006–07	Binghamton Senators	AHL	71	26	39	65	44	—	—	—	—	—
2007–08	Portland Pirates	AHL	74	18	54	72	66	18	6	11	17	4
2007–08	Anaheim Ducks	NHL	3	0	0	0	2	—	—	—	—	—
2008–09	Iowa Chops	AHL	28	10	19	29	6	—	—	—	—	—
2008–09	Anaheim Ducks	NHL	48	8	24	32	24	13	1	2	3	8
2009–10	Anaheim Ducks	NHL	2	0	0	0	0	—	—	—	—	—
2009–10	Chicago Blackhawks	NHL	10	1	0	1	2	—	—	—	—	—
2009–10	Minnesota Wild	NHL	49	8	6	14	6	—	—	—	—	—
2010–11	San Antonio Rampage	AHL	37	11	27	38	12	—	—	—	—	—
2010–11	Phoenix Coyotes	NHL	33	2	3	5	4	3	0	0	0	0
2011–12	Vancouver Canucks	NHL	18	5	1	6	6	1	0	0	0	0
2012–13	Chicago Wolves	AHL	37	11	21	32	10	—	—	—	—	—
2012–13	Vancouver Canucks	NHL	28	1	5	6	4	2	0	0	0	0
2013–14	Wilkes–Barre/Scranton Penguins	AHL	44	13	27	40	28	6	2	6	8	14
2013–14	Pittsburgh Penguins	NHL	9	0	1	1	0	—	—	—	—	—
2014–15	Wilkes–Barre/Scranton Penguins	AHL	44	17	27	44	12	8	1	6	7	2
2014–15	Pittsburgh Penguins	NHL	24	1	5	6	2	—	—	—	—	—
2015–16	SC Bern	NLA	19	4	9	13	10	14	5	10	15	0
2016–17	SC Bern	NLA	34	9	16	25	8	16	8	12	20	8
2017–18	SC Bern	NL	48	14	34	48	10	11	2	12	14	2
2018–19	SC Bern	NL	45	14	19	33	37	18	1	10	11	2
2019–20	SC Bern	NL	48	13	19	32	18	—	—	—	—	—
2020–21	EHC Red Bull München	DEL	16	2	1	3	4	—	—	—	—	—
AHL totals			335	106	214	320	178	32	9	23	32	20
NHL totals			224	26	45	71	50	19	1	2	3	8
NL totals			194	54	97	151	83	59	16	44	60	14

=== International ===
Year	Team	Event	Result	GP	G	A	Pts	PIM
2018	Canada	OG	3rd place, bronze medalist(s)	5	2	1	3	0
Senior totals				5	2	1	3	0

== Awards and honours ==
Award	Year
BCHL
(Interior) Rookie of the Year	2002
AHL
All-Star Game	2008
NL
Champion (SC Bern)	2016, 2017, 2019
All-Star Team	2018
MVP	2018
