= Dustin Jeffrey =

Canadian ice hockey player (born 1988)

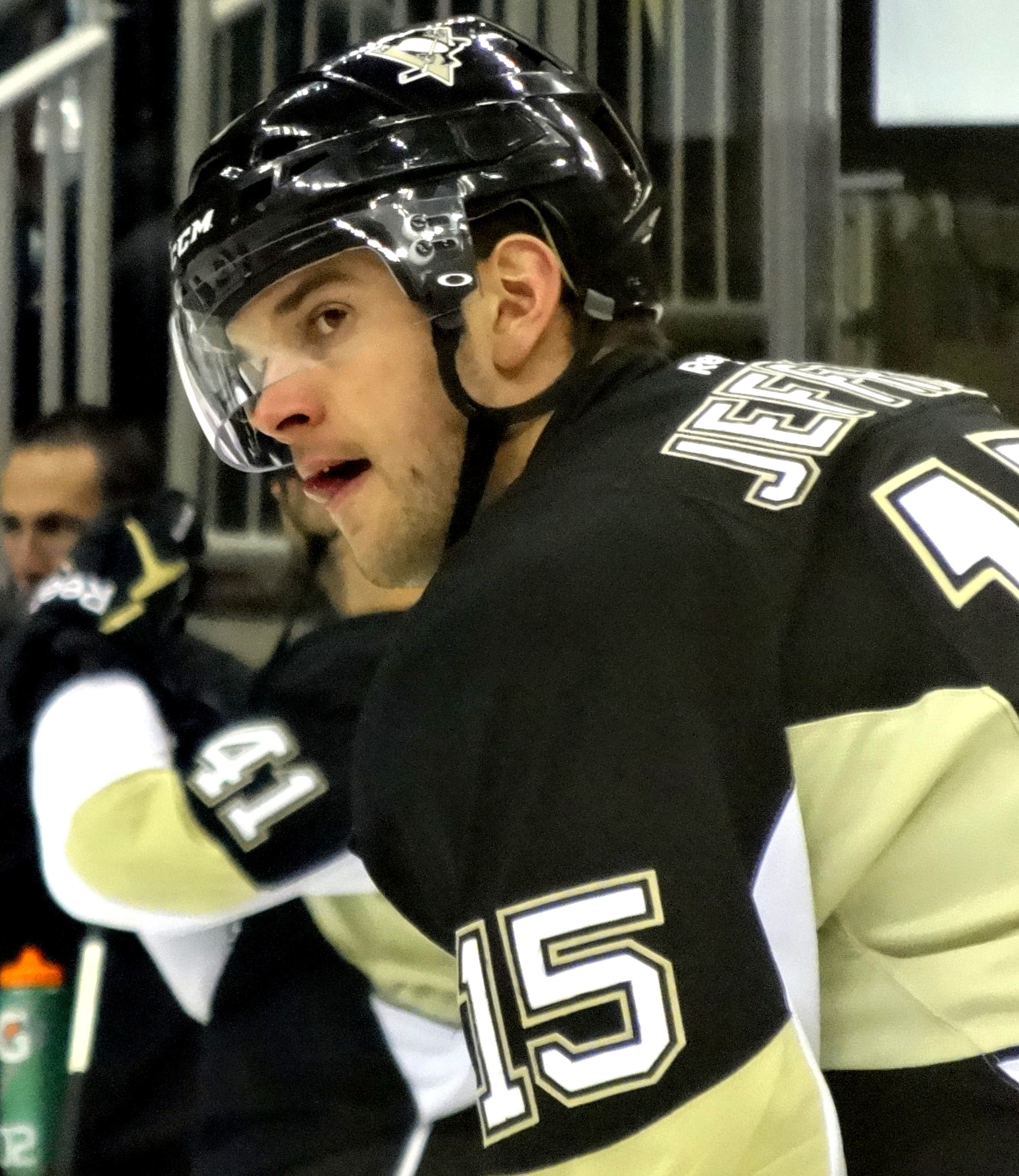
- Jeffrey with the Pittsburgh Penguins in 2013.
- Born: February 27, 1988 (age 38) Sarnia, Ontario, Canada
- Height: 6 ft 1 in (185 cm)
- Weight: 205 lb (93 kg; 14 st 9 lb)
- Position: Centre
- Shot: Left
- Played for: Pittsburgh Penguins; Dallas Stars; Arizona Coyotes; Lausanne HC; SC Bern; Grizzlys Wolfsburg
- NHL draft: 171st overall, 2007; Pittsburgh Penguins
- Playing career: 2008–2023

Dustin Jeffrey (born February 27, 1988) is a Canadian former professional ice hockey center who played in the National Hockey League (NHL). Jeffrey was drafted as the 171st overall selection in the sixth round of the 2007 NHL entry draft by the Penguins.

== Playing career ==
Jeffrey grew up in Courtright, Ontario, playing minor hockey for the Mooretown Flags and the Lambton Jr. Sting AAA teams of the Pavilion League.

On October 9, 2007, Jeffrey signed a three-year entry-level contract with the Pittsburgh Penguins. He attended training camp with the Penguins in September 2008, and was assigned to the Wilkes-Barre/Scranton Penguins. Jeffrey tallied his first professional point in his second professional game in the AHL with the Wilkes-Barre/Scranton Penguins on October 11, 2008 against the Philadelphia Phantoms. He scored this goal a minute into the first period on goaltender Jean-Sébastien Aubin.

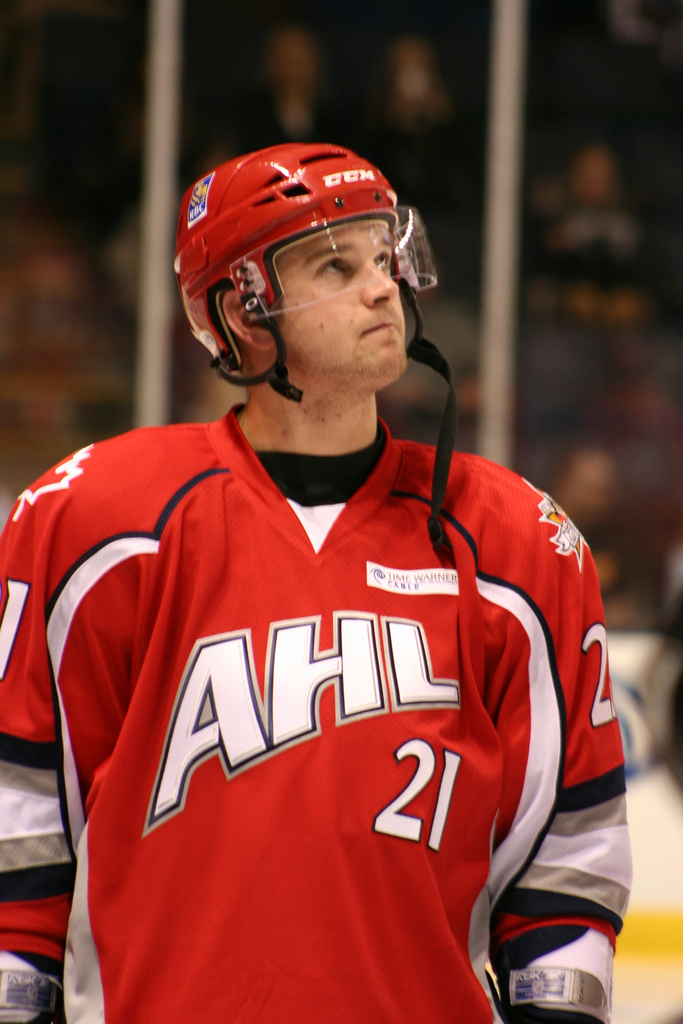
Jeffrey in 2010

Jeffrey made his NHL debut with the Penguins on December 26, 2008. He recorded his first point on December 30 and his first goal on January 1, 2009, both against goaltender Manny Fernandez of the Boston Bruins. He was called as spare for 2009 playoffs. Pittsburgh gave him a Stanley Cup ring, and included him on the team picture. Jeffrey however did not qualify to be included on the Stanley Cup.

Jeffrey played with both the Pittsburgh and their AHL affiliate Wilkes-Barre multiple times during the 2010-11 NHL season. He played 25 games with the Penguins during the 2010–11 season, scoring seven goals and 12 points in 25 games. His season came to an end on March 24, 2011, when he was placed on the injured reserve due to a "lower body injury" after Philadelphia Flyers forward Jeff Carter fell on Jeffrey's right knee. It was revealed on April 5, 2011 that he had a torn ACL and had undergone surgery; he required six months' worth of rehabilitation and did not return until the start of the 2011–12 season.

On July 12, 2011 Jeffrey signed a two-year, two-way contract with the Penguins worth $575,000 annually at the NHL level. On October 10, 2012, with the NHL lock-out in effect, Jeffrey signed a temporary contract with Croatian club KHL Medveščak Zagreb of the Austrian Hockey League.

On November 17, 2013, Jeffrey was put on waivers by the Penguins and claimed by the Dallas Stars. On June 17, 2014, the Texas Stars won the Calder Cup for the first time in franchise history. Jeffrey wasn't given a qualifying offer before the Restricted Free Agent deadline, from the Stars, making him an unrestricted free agent.

On July 2, 2014, Jeffrey signed a one-year free agent contract with the Vancouver Canucks. He was traded to the New York Islanders in exchange for Cory Conacher on March 2, 2015.

On July 1, 2015, Jeffrey continued his journeyman career in signing a one-year, two-way contract as a free agent with the Arizona Coyotes. In the 2015–16 season, Jeffrey maintained his offensive prowess in the AHL with affiliate, the Springfield Falcons. He was recalled by the Coyotes on two occasions appearing in 7 games for a goal and assist. After scoring 46 points in just 45 games, Jeffrey was dealt by the Coyotes alongside Dan O'Donoghue and James Melindy in a return to the Pittsburgh Penguins organization in exchange for Matia Marcantuoni on February 29, 2016. He was directly assigned to continue the season with Wilkes-Barre/Scranton.

On June 3, 2016, Jeffrey left North America and agreed to a two-year contract with Lausanne HC of the National League (NL). On December 20, 2017, Jeffrey agreed to an early two-year contract extension with Lausanne through the 2019–20 season. On November 21, 2019, it was announced that this would be Jeffrey's final season with Lausanne as the team didn't wish to extend his contract. A few days later, on December 4, 2019, Jeffrey agreed to a two-year deal with SC Bern for the 2020/21 and 2021/22 season.

Following the conclusion of his contract with Bern, Jeffrey moved to Germany as a free agent by agreeing to a one-year contract with Grizzlys Wolfsburg of the DEL on July 18, 2022.

== Coaching career ==
On November 17, 2023, Jeffrey was announced as Assistant Coach of the Sarnia Sting.

== Career statistics ==
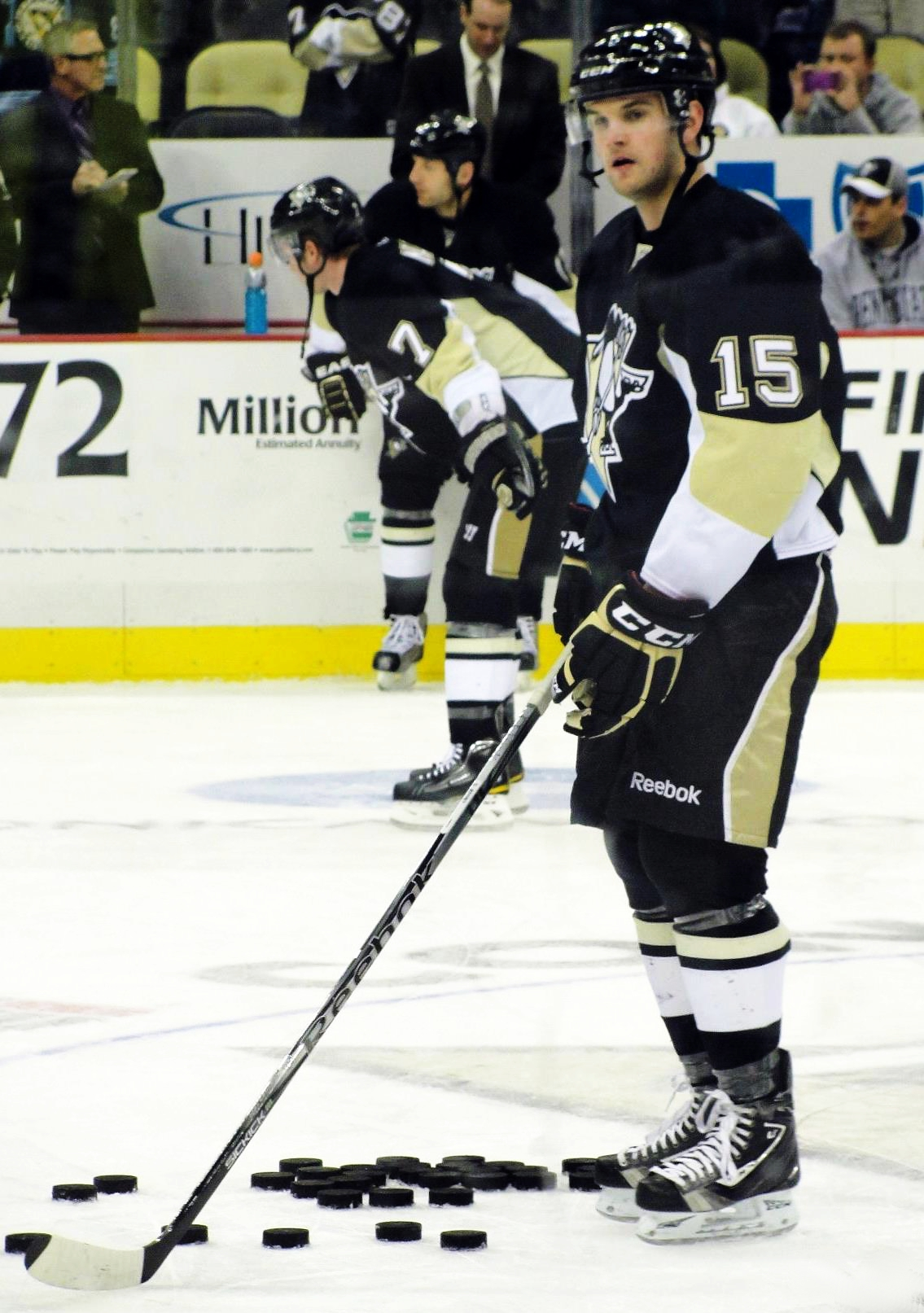
Jeffrey with the Pittsburgh Penguins in 2011

			Regular season					Playoffs
Season	Team	League	GP	G	A	Pts	PIM	GP	G	A	Pts	PIM
2004–05	Mississauga IceDogs	OHL	53	10	15	25	20	—	—	—	—	—
2005–06	Mississauga IceDogs	OHL	30	6	9	15	26	—	—	—	—	—
2005–06	Sault Ste. Marie Greyhounds	OHL	39	12	11	23	10	4	1	2	3	2
2006–07	Sault Ste. Marie Greyhounds	OHL	68	34	58	92	40	13	6	12	18	11
2007–08	Sault Ste. Marie Greyhounds	OHL	56	38	59	97	30	14	3	8	11	12
2007–08	Wilkes-Barre/Scranton Penguins	AHL	—	—	—	—	—	15	2	1	3	4
2008–09	Wilkes-Barre/Scranton Penguins	AHL	63	11	26	37	31	12	5	5	10	8
2008–09	Pittsburgh Penguins	NHL	14	1	2	3	0	—	—	—	—	—
2009–10	Wilkes-Barre/Scranton Penguins	AHL	77	24	47	71	16	4	0	1	1	6
2009–10	Pittsburgh Penguins	NHL	1	0	0	0	0	—	—	—	—	—
2010–11	Wilkes-Barre/Scranton Penguins	AHL	40	17	28	45	8	—	—	—	—	—
2010–11	Pittsburgh Penguins	NHL	25	7	5	12	4	—	—	—	—	—
2011–12	Pittsburgh Penguins	NHL	26	4	2	6	2	—	—	—	—	—
2011–12	Wilkes-Barre/Scranton Penguins	AHL	2	0	1	1	0	—	—	—	—	—
2012–13	KHL Medveščak Zagreb	AUT	20	11	12	23	20	—	—	—	—	—
2012–13	Pittsburgh Penguins	NHL	24	3	3	6	2	—	—	—	—	—
2013–14	Pittsburgh Penguins	NHL	10	0	1	1	2	—	—	—	—	—
2013–14	Dallas Stars	NHL	24	2	1	3	0	—	—	—	—	—
2013–14	Texas Stars	AHL	21	4	6	10	2	19	7	5	12	2
2014–15	Utica Comets	AHL	49	17	24	41	18	—	—	—	—	—
2014–15	Bridgeport Sound Tigers	AHL	20	8	15	23	4	—	—	—	—	—
2015–16	Springfield Falcons	AHL	45	13	33	46	18	—	—	—	—	—
2015–16	Arizona Coyotes	NHL	7	1	1	2	2	—	—	—	—	—
2015–16	Wilkes-Barre/Scranton Penguins	AHL	19	7	11	18	2	10	1	7	8	0
2016–17	Lausanne HC	NLA	49	18	28	46	8	4	0	1	1	0
2017–18	Lausanne HC	NL	50	13	44	57	4	—	—	—	—	—
2018–19	Lausanne HC	NL	44	15	31	46	10	8	5	3	8	2
2019–20	Lausanne HC	NL	50	12	23	35	2	—	—	—	—	—
2020–21	SC Bern	NL	48	16	27	43	12	9	0	5	5	4
2021–22	SC Bern	NL	23	4	8	12	12	—	—	—	—	—
2022–23	Grizzlys Wolfsburg	DEL	54	12	41	53	22	14	1	2	3	2
AHL totals			336	101	191	292	99	60	15	19	34	20
NHL totals			131	18	15	33	12	—	—	—	—	—
NL totals			264	78	161	239	48	21	5	9	14	6

== Awards and honours ==
Award	Year
AHL
All-Star Game	2010, 2016
Calder Cup winner (Texas Stars)	2014
Second All-Star Team	2016
Spengler Cup
Spengler Cup winner (Team Canada)	2017, 2019
National League
League leader, assists	2018
League leader, points	2018
Swiss Cup winner (SC Bern)	2021
