= Dmitri Monya =

Russian ice hockey player

- Born: September 10, 1988 (age 38) Moscow, Russian SFSR, Soviet Union
- Height: 5 ft 11 in (180 cm)
- Weight: 198 lb (90 kg; 14 st 2 lb)
- Position: Right wing
- Shot: Left
- Played for: HC CSKA Moscow; HC Sibir Novosibirsk; HC Dynamo Pardubice; Avtomobilist Yekaterinburg; HC Yugra
- NHL draft: Undrafted
- Playing career: 2007–2019

Dmitri Evgeniyevich Monya (Russian: Дми́трий Евге́ньевич Мо́ня; born September 10, 1988) is a former Russian professional ice hockey winger who played in the Russian Superleague (RSL), Kontinental Hockey League (KHL), and Czech Extraliga (ELH).

== Career statistics ==
			Regular season					Playoffs
Season	Team	League	GP	G	A	Pts	PIM	GP	G	A	Pts	PIM
2004–05	HC CSKA Moscow-2	Russia3	27	3	5	8	0	—	—	—	—	—
2004–05	SDYUSHOR CSKA Moskva	MosJHL	3	1	1	2	0	—	—	—	—	—
2005–06	HC CSKA Moscow-2	Russia3	55	13	10	23	24	—	—	—	—	—
2005–06	SDYUSHOR CSKA Moskva	MosJHL	5	4	3	7	6	—	—	—	—	—
2006–07	HC CSKA Moscow-2	Russia3	72	28	37	65	32	—	—	—	—	—
2007–08	HC CSKA Moscow	RSL	1	0	1	1	0	—	—	—	—	—
2007–08	HC CSKA Moscow-2	Russia3	38	26	26	52	38	11	4	8	12	4
2008–09	HC CSKA Moscow	KHL	25	2	3	5	6	3	0	0	0	0
2008–09	HC CSKA Moscow-2	Russia3	20	14	11	25	10	14	6	9	15	4
2008–09	HC Belgorod	Russia2	1	0	0	0	0	—	—	—	—	—
2009–10	HC CSKA Moscow	KHL	50	6	3	9	14	2	2	1	3	0
2009–10	CSKA-Krasnaya Armiya Moskva	MHL	2	4	2	6	6	4	4	1	5	0
2009–10	Khimik Voskresensk	Russia2	2	1	1	2	0	—	—	—	—	—
2010–11	HC CSKA Moscow	KHL	42	4	8	12	12	—	—	—	—	—
2011–12	HC CSKA Moscow	KHL	21	4	2	6	2	1	0	0	0	0
2012–13	HC CSKA Moscow	KHL	6	0	1	1	4	1	0	0	0	0
2012–13	THK Tver	VHL	3	1	3	4	0	—	—	—	—	—
2013–14	HC Sibir Novosibirsk	KHL	47	12	11	23	14	10	4	5	9	2
2014–15	HC Sibir Novosibirsk	KHL	56	13	22	35	10	11	2	2	4	2
2015–16	HC Sibir Novosibirsk	KHL	23	0	6	6	14	—	—	—	—	—
2015–16	HC Dynamo Pardubice	ELH	11	1	3	4	2	—	—	—	—	—
2016–17	Avtomobilist Yekaterinburg	KHL	45	6	8	14	12	—	—	—	—	—
2017–18	Yugra Khanty-Mansiysk	KHL	2	0	0	0	0	—	—	—	—	—
2017–18	HC Nove Zamky	Slovak	7	0	1	1	2	—	—	—	—	—
2017–18	HC Nove Zamky B	Slovak2	2	2	2	4	0	—	—	—	—	—
2017–18	HK Mogo	Latvia	9	5	7	12	2	6	3	3	6	0
2018–19	Khimik Voskresensk	VHL	13	1	1	2	4	—	—	—	—	—
KHL totals			317	47	64	111	88	28	8	8	16	4
