= Luca Fazzini =

Swiss professional ice hockey forward

- Born: 17 March 1995 (age 30); Lugano, Switzerland
- Height: 5 ft 9 in (175 cm)
- Weight: 187 lb (85 kg; 13 st 5 lb)
- Position: Forward
- Shoots: Right
- NL team: HC Lugano
- Playing career: 2012–present

Luca Fazzini (born 17 March 1995) is a Swiss professional ice hockey forward. He is currently playing with HC Lugano of the Swiss National League (NL).

Fazzini made his senior NLA debut playing with Lugano during the 2012–13 NLA season.

== Career statistics ==
=== Regular season and playoffs ===
			Regular season					Playoffs
Season	Team	League	GP	G	A	Pts	PIM	GP	G	A	Pts	PIM
2010–11	HC Lugano	Elite Jr. A	14	10	5	15	4	1	0	0	0	0
2011–12	HC Lugano	Elite Jr. A	27	19	9	28	16	—	—	—	—	—
2012–13	HC Lugano	Elite Jr. A	15	16	9	25	69	3	1	1	2	2
2012–13	HC Lugano	NLA	21	2	1	3	2	6	0	0	0	2
2013–14	HC Lugano	Elite Jr. A	15	14	16	30	16	10	9	4	13	6
2013–14	HC Lugano	NLA	34	6	2	8	8	1	0	0	0	0
2014–15	HC Lugano	Elite Jr. A	10	7	4	11	8	2	2	2	4	2
2014–15	HC Lugano	NLA	36	2	3	5	6	4	0	1	1	0
2015–16	HC Lugano	NLA	41	2	7	9	4	14	2	1	3	2
2015–16	SC Rapperswil-Jona Lakers	NLB	7	2	3	5	4	1	0	0	0	0
2016–17	HC Lugano	NLA	45	16	10	26	8	11	5	4	9	4
2016–17	HCB Ticino Rockets	NLB	3	1	1	2	0	—	—	—	—	—
2017–18	HC Lugano	NL	48	19	23	42	6	18	4	7	11	4
2018–19	HC Lugano	NL	50	12	14	26	14	4	0	2	2	0
2019–20	HC Lugano	NL	50	14	10	24	6	—	—	—	—	—
2020–21	HC Lugano	NL	52	22	20	42	28	5	2	3	5	10
2021–22	HC Lugano	NL	52	17	26	43	24	5	1	0	1	0
NL totals			429	112	116	228	106	68	14	18	32	22

Medal record

Ice hockey

Representing Switzerland

World Junior A Challenge
Bronze medal – third place	2012 Yarmouth	

=== International ===
Year	Team	Event	Result	GP	G	A	Pts	PIM
2013	Switzerland	WJC18	6th	5	0	5	5	2
2015	Switzerland	WJC	9th	6	2	5	7	2
Junior totals				11	2	10	12	4
