= 2017–18 National League (ice hockey) season =

2017–18 National League season
- League: National League
- Sport: Ice hockey
- Duration: September 7, 2017 – March 5, 2018
- Games: 50
- Teams: 12

Regular season
- Best record: SC Bern
- Runners-up: EV Zug
- Season MVP: Andrew Ebbett (SC Bern)
- Top scorer: Dustin Jeffrey (Lausanne HC)

Playoffs
- Semi-Final champions: ZSC Lions
- Semi-Final runners-up: SC Bern
- Semi-Final champions: HC Lugano
- Semi-Final runners-up: EHC Biel

Swiss champion NLA
- Champions: ZSC Lions
- Runners-up: HC Lugano

National League seasons
- ← 2016–17 2018–19 →

The 2017–18 National League season is the 80th season of Swiss professional ice hockey and the first season as the National League (NL). The change from National League A to National League was made at the end of the 2016–17 season.

ZSC Lions won their 9th NL title, defeating HC Lugano in game 7 of the finals. SC Bern won the regular season for the second consecutive year. EHC Kloten were relegated to the Swiss League, while SC Rapperswil-Jona Lakers won promotion to the NL for 2018–19.

== Teams ==
NL teams for the 2017–18 season

| Team | City | Arena | Capacity |
|---|---|---|---|
| HC Ambrì-Piotta | Ambrì | Valascia | 6,500 |
| SC Bern | Bern | PostFinance-Arena | 17,031 |
| EHC Biel | Biel/Bienne | Tissot Arena | 6,521 |
| HC Davos | Davos | Vaillant Arena | 6,800 |
| Fribourg-Gottéron | Fribourg | BCF Arena | 6,500 |
| Genève-Servette HC | Geneva | Patinoire des Vernets | 7,135 |
| EHC Kloten | Kloten | Swiss Arena | 7,719 |
| Lausanne HC | Lausanne | Temporary Arena | 6,700 |
| HC Lugano | Lugano | Pista La Resega | 7,800 |
| SCL Tigers | Langnau im Emmental | Ilfis Stadium | 6,000 |
| ZSC Lions | Zürich | Hallenstadion | 11,200 |
| EV Zug | Zug | Bossard Arena | 7,200 |

== Coaching changes ==
=== Off-season ===
Luca Cereda replaced Gordie Dwyer as head coach of HC Ambrì-Piotta for the 2017-18 season.

Mark French took over the helm of HC Fribourg-Gottéron for the 2017-18 season, replacing Larry Huras.

Craig Woodcroft was named head coach of Genève-Servette HC after Chris McSorley stepped down of the position and was named general manager of the team.

=== In-season ===
Dan Ratushny was fired by Lausanne on October 11, 2017, after posting a 3-0-3-4 record through 10 games this season. He led Lausanne to the playoffs at the conclusion of the 2016-17 regular season, his only season at the helm of this team. Yves Sarault, who was serving as head coach of Lausanne HC's junior team at the time, stepped in to fill the spot as interim head coach, before being named head coach through the end of the current season.

Pekka Tirkkonen was fired by EHC Kloten on October 16, 2017, following a five-game losing streak and after posting a 2-0-0-11 record through 13 games this season, sitting dead last in the National League. Niklas Gaellstedt who was serving as an assistant coach at the time, replaced Tirkkonen as head coach of the team for the time being. On October 24, 2017, Kevin Schlaepfer was named head coach of the team for the remainder of the season and through the 2019-20 season.

Mike McNamara was fired by EHC Biel on November 25, 2017, after a 3-0 loss to the last team in the standings, EHC Kloten, the previous day. McNamara posted an 8-2-2-12 record through 24 games this season, sitting 7th in the standings at the time. Martin Steinegger, the general manager of the organization, took over the helm of the team as interim head coach.

== Arenas ==
HC Ambrì-Piotta is playing its final years in the old Valascia, as construction for their new building are set to begin in the spring of 2018 and should be ready in time for the 2020/21 NL season. The new Valascia will seat 7,000 people and will be located in the same area as the current one.

HC Davos' Vaillant Arena is set to undergo major renovation at the end of the season to upgrade most of the stands, the concourse and the locker rooms. The total capacity will not change and renovation will cost about CHF 22 million.

HC Fribourg-Gottéron's plans to rebuild the BCF Arena at the end of the 2016-17 season were postponed to after the current season. Construction which will cost about CHF 70 million will start in March 2018 and the arena's capacity will be increased from 6,500 to 8,500. Renovation will last 2 years and should be over in the summer of 2020.

The Patinoire des Vernets in Geneva is set to undergo minor renovation during the first national team break in November. The VIP area will be expanded to add an additional 170 seats and standing room on the north side will be brought closer to the ice rink.

This is Lausanne HC's first of two seasons playing in a temporary arena. The arena seats 6,700 people and cost CHF 11 million for the two seasons. The new arena will be ready for the 2019/20 season with a seating capacity of 10,000.

Due to popular demand, EV Zug had to increase the Bossard Arena's total capacity to 7,200. These seats are located against the boards, next to the penalty boxes and at ice level.

== Regular season ==
| Pos | Team | Pld | W | OTW | OTL | L | GF | GA | GD | Pts | Qualification |
|---|---|---|---|---|---|---|---|---|---|---|---|
| 1 | SC Bern | 50 | 27 | 8 | 5 | 10 | 167 | 112 | +55 | 102 | Advance to Playoffs |
| 2 | EV Zug | 50 | 23 | 10 | 2 | 15 | 153 | 122 | +31 | 91 | Advance to Playoffs |
| 3 | EHC Biel | 50 | 24 | 5 | 7 | 14 | 150 | 124 | +26 | 89 | Advance to Playoffs |
| 4 | HC Lugano | 50 | 26 | 3 | 2 | 19 | 159 | 130 | +29 | 86 | Advance to Playoffs |
| 5 | Fribourg-Gottéron | 50 | 20 | 5 | 7 | 18 | 133 | 139 | −6 | 77 | Advance to Playoffs |
| 6 | HC Davos | 50 | 21 | 3 | 6 | 20 | 134 | 156 | −22 | 75 | Advance to Playoffs |
| 7 | ZSC Lions | 50 | 19 | 6 | 6 | 19 | 144 | 133 | +11 | 75 | Advance to Playoffs |
| 8 | Genève-Servette HC | 50 | 16 | 8 | 7 | 19 | 132 | 153 | −21 | 71 | Advance to Playoffs |
| 9 | SCL Tigers | 50 | 17 | 6 | 4 | 23 | 120 | 134 | −14 | 67 | Advance to Playouts (Note: Relegation Playoffs) |
| 10 | Lausanne HC | 50 | 15 | 4 | 10 | 21 | 149 | 169 | −20 | 63 | Advance to Playouts |
| 11 | HC Ambrì-Piotta | 50 | 14 | 5 | 5 | 26 | 136 | 168 | −32 | 57 | Advance to Playouts |
| 12 | EHC Kloten | 50 | 9 | 6 | 8 | 27 | 120 | 157 | −37 | 47 | Advance to Playouts |

Source: NLA
Rules for classification: 1) points; 2) a higher number of wins in the regular time; 3) a higher number of wins in overtime and shootouts; 4) goal difference; 5) number of goals scored; 6) drawing of lots.

== Player statistics ==
=== Scoring leaders ===
| Player | Team | GP | G | A | Pts | +/– | PIM |
|---|---|---|---|---|---|---|---|
| Dustin Jeffrey | Lausanne HC | 50 | 13 | 44 | 57 | +7 | 4 |
| Fredrik Pettersson | ZSC Lions | 46 | 26 | 24 | 50 | +14 | 58 |
| Viktor Stalberg | EV Zug | 46 | 22 | 28 | 50 | +14 | 18 |
| Nicklas Danielsson | Lausanne HC | 49 | 25 | 25 | 50 | +11 | 64 |
| Garrett Roe | EV Zug | 44 | 12 | 37 | 49 | +24 | 32 |
| Andrew Ebbett | SC Bern | 48 | 14 | 34 | 48 | +13 | 10 |
| Mark Arcobello | SC Bern | 46 | 18 | 29 | 47 | +10 | 39 |
| Marc-Antoine Pouliot | EHC Biel | 47 | 13 | 29 | 42 | +22 | 89 |
| Luca Fazzini | HC Lugano | 48 | 19 | 23 | 42 | +3 | 6 |
| Matt D'Agostini | HC Ambrì-Piotta | 47 | 19 | 22 | 41 | -6 | 86 |

=== Leading goaltenders ===
The following goaltenders led the league in goals against average, provided that they have played at least 40% of their team's minutes.

| Player | Team | GP | TOI | W | T | L | GA | SO | Sv% | GAA |
|---|---|---|---|---|---|---|---|---|---|---|
| Leonardo Genoni | SC Bern | 46 | 2776 | 33 | 0 | 13 | 94 | 8 | .929 | 2.03 |
| Lukas Flüeler | ZSC Lions | 32 | 1872 | 16 | 0 | 15 | 66 | 2 | .919 | 2.12 |
| Tobias Stephan | EV Zug | 47 | 2858 | 31 | 0 | 16 | 109 | 5 | .927 | 2.29 |
| Barry Brust | Fribourg-Gottéron | 38 | 2308 | 21 | 0 | 17 | 89 | 2 | .926 | 2.29 |
| Jonas Hiller | EHC Biel | 47 | 2805 | 27 | 0 | 20 | 109 | 2 | .926 | 2.33 |
| Ivars Punnenovs | SC Langnau Tigers | 39 | 2198 | 19 | 0 | 20 | 90 | 1 | .918 | 2.46 |
| Luca Boltshauser | EHC Kloten | 41 | 2381 | 14 | 0 | 27 | 104 | 1 | .918 | 2.62 |
| Elvis Merzlikins | HC Lugano | 42 | 2431 | 22 | 0 | 18 | 110 | 4 | .921 | 2.72 |
| Robert Mayer | Genève-Servette HC | 32 | 1832 | 14 | 0 | 17 | 86 | 2 | .909 | 2.81 |
| Niklas Schlegel | ZSC Lions | 20 | 1150 | 9 | 0 | 10 | 53 | 1 | .897 | 2.77 |

== Playoffs ==
Quarter-Finals
1 | SC Bern | 4
8 | Genève-Servette HC | 1
2 | EV Zug | 1
7 | ZSC Lions | 4
(Pairings are reseeded after the first round)
3 | EHC Biel | 4
6 | HC Davos | 2
4 | HC Lugano | 4
5 | HC Fribourg-Gottéron | 1

Semi-Finals
1 | SC Bern | 2
7 | ZSC Lions | 4
3 | EHC Biel | 2
4 | HC Lugano | 4

Finals
7 | ZSC Lions | 4
4 | HC Lugano | 3
