= 2017 Spengler Cup =

2017 Spengler Cup Davos, Switzerland
Tournament details
- Host country: Switzerland
- Venue(s): Vaillant Arena
- Dates: 26–31 December 2017
- Teams: 6

Final positions
- Champions: Team Canada (15th title)
- Runner-up: Team Switzerland

Tournament statistics
- Games played: 11
- Goals scored: 69 (6.27 per game)

Official website
- Spengler Cup

The 2017 Spengler Cup was a men's ice hockey competition being held in Davos, Switzerland from December 26 to December 31, 2017. All matches were being played at HC Davos's home known as Vaillant Arena.

Six competing teams were split into two groups of three (in the round-robin series). The two groups, named Torriani and Cattini, are named after legendary Swiss hockey players Richard 'Bibi' Torriani and the Cattini brothers, Hans and Ferdinand.

== Teams participating ==
The list of teams that are participating in the tournament are as listed.

- (Switzerland) HC Davos (host)
- Team Canada
- Team Switzerland
- (Finland) HPK
- (Latvia) Dinamo Riga
- (Czech Republic) Mountfield HK

== Match officials ==
The officials who are named to the tournament are as listed.

Referees	Linesmen
(Switzerland) Stefan Eichmann	(Switzerland) Cedric Borga
(United States) Mark Lemelin	(Switzerland) Nicolas Fluri
(Finland) Anssi Salonen	(Switzerland) Roman Kaderli
(Switzerland) Daniel Stricker	(Switzerland) Bryce Kovacs
(Switzerland) Tobias Wehrli	(Switzerland) David Obwegeser

== Group stage ==
=== Key ===
- W (regulation win) – 3 pts.
- OTW (overtime/shootout win) – 2 pts.
- OTL (overtime/shootout loss) – 1 pt.
- L (regulation loss) – 0 pts.

=== Group Torriani ===
Team	Pld	W	OTW	OTL	L	GF	GA	GD	Pts	Qualification
Team Switzerland	2	2	0	0	0	10	1	+9	6	Clinched group
(Latvia) Dinamo Riga	2	0	1	0	1	5	9	−4	2	Quarterfinal berth
(Finland) HPK	2	0	0	1	1	3	8	−5	1	Quarterfinal berth

All times are local (UTC+1).

26 December 2017; 15:10	Team Switzerland	6–1 (3–0, 1–1, 2–0)	(Latvia) Dinamo Riga	Vaillant Arena

Game reference

Leonardo Genoni
Goalies
Jānis Kalniņš

01:30 – Eric Blum	1–0
03:39 – Raphael Diaz (Luca Cunti, Vincent Praplan)	2–0
12:36 – Damien Brunner (Denis Hollenstein, Ramon Untersander)	3–0
	3–1	Miks Indrašis (Lauris Dārziņš) – 29:46
30:18 – Dominik Schlumpf (Fabrice Herzog)	4–1
49:17 – Luca Fazzini (Leonardo Genoni)	5–1
57:18 – Lino Martschini (Fabrice Herzog)	6–1

10 min
Penalties
8 min

27 December 2017; 15:10	HPK (Finland)	3–4 OT (1–1, 0–1, 2–1, 0–1)	(Latvia) Dinamo Riga	Vaillant Arena

Game reference

28 December 2017; 15:10	Team Switzerland	4–0 (2–0, 0–0, 2–0)	(Finland) HPK	Vaillant Arena

Game reference

=== Group Cattini ===
Team	Pld	W	OTW	OTL	L	GF	GA	GD	Pts	Qualification
Team Canada	2	2	0	0	0	9	4	+5	6	Clinched group
(Switzerland) HC Davos	2	1	0	0	1	6	5	+1	3	Quarterfinal berth
(Czech Republic) Mountfield HK	2	0	0	0	2	4	10	−6	0	Quarterfinal berth

All times are local (UTC+1).

26 December 2017; 20:15	Mountfield HK (Czech Republic)	3–5 (1–2, 1–1, 1–2)	Team Canada	Vaillant Arena

Game reference

27 December 2017; 20:15	HC Davos (Switzerland)	5–1 (1–0, 3–0, 1–1)	(Czech Republic) Mountfield HK	Vaillant Arena

Game reference

28 December 2017; 20:15	Team Canada	4–1 (0–1, 3–0, 1–0)	(Switzerland) HC Davos	Vaillant Arena

Game reference

== Knockout stage ==
Quarterfinals
A2	(Latvia) Dinamo Riga	1
B3	(Czech Republic) Mountfield HK	4
B2	(Switzerland) HC Davos	4
A3	(Finland) HPK	2

Semifinals
B1	Team Canada	5
QF1	(Czech Republic) Mountfield HK	2
A1	Team Switzerland	8
QF2	(Switzerland) HC Davos	3

Final
SF1	Team Canada	3
SF2	Team Switzerland	0

=== Quarterfinals ===
All times are local (UTC+1).

29 December 2017; 15:10	Dinamo Riga (Latvia)	1–4 (1–1, 0–1, 0–2)	(Czech Republic) Mountfield HK	Vaillant Arena

Game reference

29 December 2017; 20:15	HC Davos (Switzerland)	4–2 (1–2, 2–0, 1–0)	(Finland) HPK	Vaillant Arena

Game reference

=== Semifinals ===
All times are local (UTC+1).

30 December 2017; 15:10	Team Canada	5–2 (2–1, 1–1, 2–0)	(Czech Republic) Mountfield HK	Vaillant Arena

Game reference

30 December 2017; 20:15	Team Switzerland	8–3 (2–2, 2–1, 4–0)	(Switzerland) HC Davos	Vaillant Arena

Game reference

=== Final ===
All times are local (UTC+1).

31 December 2017; 12:10	Team Canada	3–0 (0–0, 2–0, 1–0)	Team Switzerland	Vaillant Arena

Game reference

== Champions ==
2017 Spengler Cup Winners
(Canada)
Team Canada
15th title

== All-Star Team ==
Position	Player	Nationality	Team
Goaltender	Kevin Poulin	(Canada) Canadian	Team Canada
Right Defender	Magnus Nygren	(Sweden) Swedish	(Switzerland) HC Davos
Left Defender	Eric Blum	(Switzerland) Swiss	Team Switzerland
Right Wing	Tomi Sallinen	(Finland) Finnish	(Switzerland) HC Davos
Center	Andrew Ebbett	(Canada) Canadian	Team Canada
Left Wing	Jaroslav Bednář	(Czech Republic) Czech	(Czech Republic) Mountfield HK
