= 2014 Spengler Cup =

2014 Spengler Cup Davos, Switzerland
Tournament details
- Host country: Switzerland
- Venue: Vaillant Arena
- Dates: 26 – 31 December 2014
- Teams: 6

Final positions
- Champions: (Switzerland) Genève-Servette HC (2nd title)
- Runners-up: (Russia) Salavat Yulaev Ufa

Tournament statistics
- Games played: 11
- Goals scored: 55 (5 per game)
- Scoring leader(s): (Switzerland) Romain Loeffel (6 pts) , (Canada) Marc-Antoine Pouliot (6 pts) , (Canada) Tom Pyatt (6 pts)

Official website
- Spengler Cup

The 2014 Spengler Cup was an ice hockey competition held in Davos, Switzerland from December 26 to December 31, 2014. All matches were played at HC Davos's home known as Vaillant Arena. Six competing teams were split into two groups of three (in the round-robin series). The two groups, named Torriani and Cattini, were named after legendary Swiss hockey players Richard 'Bibi' Torriani and the Cattini brothers, Hans and Ferdinand.

== Teams participating ==
The list of teams that participated in the tournament are as listed.

- (Switzerland) HC Davos (host)
- Team Canada
- (Croatia) KHL Medveščak Zagreb
- (Switzerland) Genève-Servette HC
- (Finland) Jokerit
- (Russia) Salavat Yulaev Ufa

== Group stage ==
=== Key ===
- W (regulation win) – 3 pts.
- OTW (overtime/shootout win) – 2 pts.
- OTL (overtime/shootout loss) – 1 pt.
- L (regulation loss) – 0 pts.

=== Group Torriani ===
Team	Pld	W	OTW	OTL	L	GF	GA	GD	Pts	Qualification
(Switzerland) Genève-Servette HC	2	2	0	0	0	6	3	+3	6	Clinched group
(Russia) Salavat Yulaev Ufa	2	1	0	0	1	6	6	0	3	Quarterfinal berth
(Finland) Jokerit	2	0	0	0	2	4	7	−3	0	Quarterfinal berth

All times are local (UTC+1).

26 December 2014; 15:00	Genève-Servette HC (Switzerland)	3 – 2 (3 – 0, 0 – 2, 0 – 0)	(Russia) Salavat Yulaev Ufa	Vaillant Arena; Attendance: 6,300

Game reference

Christophe Bays
Janick Schwendener (17:51, 2nd period)
Goalies
Vladimir Sohatskiy
Referees:
(Switzerland) Stefan Eichmann
(Germany) Daniel Piechaczeck
Linesmen:
(Switzerland) Franco Espinoza
(Switzerland) Andreas Kohler

Timothy Kast (Tom Pyatt, Taylor Pyatt) (PP) – 5:48	1 – 0
Taylor Pyatt (Timothy Kast, Arnaud Jacquemet) (PP) – 13:59	2 – 0
Inti Pestoni – 17:21	3 – 0
	3 – 1	31:31 – Anton Slepyshev
	3 – 2	34:14 – Ilkka Heikkinen (Anton Slepyshev, Dmitri Semin)

10:00 min
Penalties
4:00 min
16
Shots
31

27 December 2014; 15:00	Jokerit (Finland)	3 – 4 (1 – 2, 1 – 2, 1 – 0)	(Russia) Salavat Yulaev Ufa	Vaillant Arena

Game reference

Riku Helenius
Goalies
Leland Irving
Referees:
(Switzerland) Stefan Eichmann
(Switzerland) Danny Kurmann
Linesmen:
(Switzerland) Roman Kaderli
(Switzerland) Andreas Kohler

Eetu Pöysti (Niko Kapanen, Ossi Väänänen) – 0:16	1 – 0
	1 – 1	2:03 – Alexei Glukhov (Alexander Kutuzov, Anton Slepyshev)
	1 – 2	10:49 – Antti Pihlström (Ivan Vishnevskiy, Andrei Zubarev) (PP)
	1 – 3	28:49 – Antti Pihlström (2) (Alexander Kutuzov, Alexei Kaigorodov)
Linus Omark (Atte Ohtamaa) – 29:32	2 – 3
	2 – 4	30:22 – Teemu Hartikainen (Ilkka Heikkinen)
Linus Omark (2) (Steve Moses) (PP) – 41:30	3 – 4

12:00 min
Penalties
10:00 min
33
Shots
26

28 December 2014; 15:00	Genève-Servette HC (Switzerland)	3 – 1 (1 – 0, 0 – 1, 2 – 0)	(Finland) Jokerit	Vaillant Arena; Attendance: 6,300

Game reference

Janick Schwendener
Goalies
Henrik Karlsson
Referees:
(Germany) Daniel Piechaczeck
(Switzerland) Marc Wiegand
Linesmen:
(Switzerland) Nicolas Fluri
(Switzerland) Andreas Kohler

Kevin Romy (Matthew Lombardi) (PP) – 6:27	1 – 0
	1 – 1	33:06 – Ville Lajunen (Linus Omark, Petr Koukal) (PP)
Inti Pestoni (2) (Daniel Vukovic) — 41:36	2 – 1
Arnaud Jacquemet (Taylor Pyatt, Tom Pyatt) — 47:16	3 – 1

8:00 min
Penalties
20:00 min
37
Shots
27

=== Group Cattini ===
Team	Pld	W	OTW	OTL	L	GF	GA	GD	Pts	Qualification
(Switzerland) HC Davos	2	2	0	0	0	3	1	+2	6	Clinched group
Team Canada	2	1	0	0	1	4	3	+1	3	Quarterfinal berth
(Croatia) KHL Medveščak Zagreb	2	0	0	0	2	1	4	−3	0	Quarterfinal berth

All times are local (UTC+1).

26 December 2014; 20:15	HC Davos (Switzerland)	2 – 1 (1 – 0, 0 – 0, 1 – 1)	Team Canada	Vaillant Arena; Attendance: 6,300

Game reference

Leonardo Genoni
Goalies
Nolan Schaefer
Referees:
(Switzerland) Danny Kurmann
(Switzerland) Marc Wiegand
Linesmen:
(Switzerland) Nicholas Fluri
(Switzerland) Michaël Tscherring

Beat Forster (Perttu Lindgren) – 7:34	1 – 0
Dick Axelsson (PP) – 47:50	2 – 0
	2 – 1	49:10 – Alexandre Giroux (Marc-André Gragnani, Marc-Antoine Pouliot) (PP)

8:00 min
Penalties
16:00 min
29
Shots
37

27 December 2014; 20:15	KHL Medveščak Zagreb (Croatia)	1 – 3 (0 – 2, 0 – 1, 1 – 0)	Team Canada	Vaillant Arena; Attendance: 6,300

Game reference

Calvin Heeter
Goalies
Drew MacIntyre
Referees:
(Canada) Kendrick Nicholson
(Germany) Daniel Piechaczek
Linesmen:
(Switzerland) Franco Espinoza
(Switzerland) Michaël Tscherring

	0 – 1	11:45 – Bud Holloway (Derrick Walser, Byron Ritchie)
	0 – 2	17:36 – Stefano Giliati (Brett McLean)
	0 – 3	21:07 – Alexandre Giroux (2) (Marc-Antoine Pouliot)
Pascal Pelletier (Martin St. Pierre) – 48:15	1 – 3

4:00 min
Penalties
10:00 min
25
Shots
24

28 December 2014; 20:15	HC Davos (Switzerland)	1 – 0 (1 – 0, 0 – 0, 0 – 0)	(Croatia) KHL Medveščak Zagreb	Vaillant Arena; Attendance: 6,300

Game reference
Leonardo Genoni	Goalies	Mark Owuya	Referees: (Switzerland) Danny Kurmann (Canada) Kendrick Nicholson; Linesmen: (Switzerland) Roman Kaderli (Switzerland) Michaël Tscherring
Marcus Paulsson (Sven Ryser) — 01:27 / 1 - 0			Referees: (Switzerland) Danny Kurmann (Canada) Kendrick Nicholson; Linesmen: (Switzerland) Roman Kaderli (Switzerland) Michaël Tscherring
16:00 min	Penalties	10:00 min	Referees: (Switzerland) Danny Kurmann (Canada) Kendrick Nicholson; Linesmen: (Switzerland) Roman Kaderli (Switzerland) Michaël Tscherring
25	Shots	24	Referees: (Switzerland) Danny Kurmann (Canada) Kendrick Nicholson; Linesmen: (Switzerland) Roman Kaderli (Switzerland) Michaël Tscherring

== Knockout stage ==
Quarterfinals
A2	(Russia) Salavat Yulaev Ufa	3
B3	(Croatia) KHL Medveščak Zagreb	0
B2	Team Canada	5
A3	(Finland) Jokerit	2

Semifinals
B1	(Switzerland) HC Davos	3
QF1	(Russia) Salavat Yulaev Ufa (SO)	4
A1	(Switzerland) Genève-Servette HC	6
QF2	Team Canada	5

Final
SF1	(Russia) Salavat Yulaev Ufa	0
SF2	(Switzerland) Genève-Servette HC	3

=== Quarterfinals ===
All times are local (UTC+1).

29 December 2014; 15:00	Salavat Yulaev Ufa (Russia)	3 – 0 (1 – 0, 0 – 0, 2 – 0)	(Croatia) KHL Medveščak Zagreb	Vaillant Arena; Attendance: 5,934

Game reference

Leland Irving
Goalies
Calvin Heeter
Referees:
(Switzerland) Stefan Eichmann
(Switzerland) Marc Wiegand
Linesmen:
(Switzerland) Nicolas Fluri
(Switzerland) Andreas Kohler

Dmitri Semin (Egor Dubrovskiy, Alexander Mereskin) – 19:25	1 – 0
Stanislav Golovanov – 49:23	2 – 0
Teemu Hartikainen (2) (Alexei Glukhov, Anton Slepyshev) (PP) – 53:13	3 – 0

10:00 min
Penalties
16:00 min
31
Shots
24

29 December 2014; 20:15	Team Canada	5 – 2 (1 – 2, 2 – 0, 2 – 0)	(Finland) Jokerit	Vaillant Arena

Game reference

Drew MacIntyre
Goalies
Riku Helenius (55:05)
Referees:
(Canada) Kendrick Nicholson
(Germany) Daniel Piechaczek
Linesmen:
(Switzerland) Franco Espinoza
(Switzerland) Roman Kaderli

	0 – 1	0:58 – Steve Moses (Linus Omark)
	0 – 2	4:08 – Linus Omark (3) (Steve Moses, Petr Koukal)
Micki DuPont (Marc-Antoine Pouliot) (PP) – 17:44	1 – 2
Alexandre Giroux (3) (Micki DuPont, Derrick Walser) (PP) – 24:11	2 – 2
Jeff Tambellini (Bud Holloway) – 38:33	3 – 2
Brett McLean (Colby Genoway) (SH) – 53:08	4 – 2
Marc-André Gragnani (Marc-Antoine Pouliot, Colby Genoway) (SH) (ENG) – 59:05	5 – 2

24:00 min
Penalties
20:00 min
25
Shots
13

=== Semifinals ===
All times are local (UTC+1).

30 December 2014; 15:00	HC Davos (Switzerland)	3 – 4 SO (2 – 0, 0 – 1, 1 – 2, 0 – 0, 0 – 1) (SO: 0 – 1)	(Russia) Salavat Yulaev Ufa	Vaillant Arena; Attendance: 6,300

Game reference

Leonardo Genoni
Goalies
Leland Irving
Referees:
(Canada) Kendrick Nicholson
(Switzerland) Marc Wigand
Linesmen:
(Switzerland) Nicolas Fluri
(Switzerland) Michaël Tscherrig

Nicklas Danielsson (Niklas Persson) – 4:15	1 – 0
Marcus Paulsson (Enzo Corvi, Perttu Lindgren) (PP) – 13:42	2 – 0
	2 – 1	27:35 – Alexander Pankov (Alexei Kaigorodov)
	2 – 2	41:12 – Anton Slepyshev (2) (Alexei Kaigorodov) (PP)
	2 – 3	49:16 – Denis Khlystov (Stanislav Golovanov, Andrei Zubarev)
Nicklas Danielsson (2) (Dick Axelsson, Niklas Persson) (PP) – 52:48	3 – 3

Ville Koistinen (miss)
Marcus Paulsson (miss)
Nicklas Danielsson (miss)
Shootout
(miss) Alexei Kaigorodov
Teemu Hartikainen (3)
(miss) Stanislav Golovanov
39:00 min
Penalties
41:00 min
30
Shots
29

30 December 2014; 20:15	Genève-Servette HC (Switzerland)	6 – 5 (2 – 0, 3 – 3, 1 – 2)	Team Canada	Vaillant Arena; Attendance: 6,300

Game reference

Janick Schwendener
Goalies
Drew MacIntyre (1st & 2nd periods, 27:04)
Nolan Schaefer (2nd & 3rd periods, 32:04)
Referees:
(Switzerland) Stefan Eichmann
(Switzerland) Danny Kurmann
Linesmen:
(Switzerland) Franco Espinoza
(Switzerland) Roman Kaderli

Inti Pestoni (3) (Alexandre Picard, Kevin Romy) – 8:10	1 – 0
Tom Pyatt (Matthew Lombardi, Taylor Pyatt) – 19:40	2 – 0
Romain Loeffel (Tom Pyatt) (PP) – 26:46	3 – 0
Francis Bouillon (Cody Almond) – 27:04	4 – 0
Timothy Kast (2) (Daniel Rubin) (SH) – 30:25	5 – 0
	5 – 1	30:54 – Mike Hedden (Micki DuPont, Derrick Walser)
	5 – 2	36:03 – Ryan Parent (Steve McCarthy)
	5 – 3	39:26 – Jérôme Samson (Marc-Antoine Pouliot, Brendan Mikkelson)
	5 – 4	41:39 – Alexandre Giroux (4) (Micki DuPont) (PP)
Romain Loeffel (2) (Arnaud Jacquemet) (PP) – 45:19	6 – 4
	6 – 5	50:42 – Marc-Antoine Pouliot (Alexandre Giroux)

10:00 min
Penalties
8:00 min
33
Shots
31

=== Final ===
All times are local (UTC+1).

31 December 2014; 12:00	Salavat Yulaev Ufa (Russia)	0 – 3 (0 – 0, 0 – 2, 0 – 1)	(Switzerland) Genève-Servette HC	Vaillant Arena; Attendance: 6,300

Game reference

Leland Irving
Goalies
Janick Schwendener
Referees:
(Switzerland) Danny Kurmann
(Canada) Kendrick Nicholson
Linesmen:
(Switzerland) Nicolas Fluri
(Switzerland) Michaël Tscherrig

0 – 1	22:54 – Arnaud Jacquemet (2) (Tom Pyatt, Romain Loeffel) (PP)
0 – 2	34:31 – Daniel Rubin (Cody Almond, Romain Loeffel) (PP)
0 – 3	49:26 – Taylor Pyatt (2) (Tom Pyatt, Daniel Rubin)

10:00 min
Penalties
10:00 min
21
Shots
31

== Champions ==
2014 Spengler Cup winners

Second title

== All-Star Team ==
Position	Player	Nationality	Team
Goaltender	Leonardo Genoni	(Switzerland) Swiss	(Switzerland) HC Davos
Right defender	Félicien Du Bois	(Switzerland) Swiss	(Switzerland) HC Davos
Left defender	Ilkka Heikkinen	(Finland) Finnish	(Russia) Salavat Yulaev Ufa
Right wing	Inti Pestoni	(Switzerland) Swiss	(Switzerland) Genève-Servette HC
Center	Anton Slepyshev	(Russia) Russian	(Russia) Salavat Yulaev Ufa
Left wing	Linus Omark	(Sweden) Swedish	(Finland) Jokerit

== Statistics ==
=== Scoring leaders ===
Player	Team	GP	G	A	Pts
(Switzerland) Romain Loeffel	Genève-Servette HC	4	2	4	6
(Canada) Marc-Antoine Pouliot	Team Canada	4	1	5	6
(Canada) Tom Pyatt	Genève-Servette HC	4	1	5	6
(Sweden) Linus Omark	Jokerit	3	3	2	5
(Canada) Alexandre Giroux	Team Canada	4	4	1	5
(Russia) Anton Slepyshev	Salavat Yulaev Ufa	5	2	3	5
(Canada) Micki DuPont	Team Canada	4	1	4	5
(Canada) Taylor Pyatt	Genève-Servette HC	4	2	2	4

GP = Games played; G = Goals; A = Assists; Pts = Points
