= Tristan Scherwey =

Swiss ice hockey player

- Born: 7 May 1991 (age 34) Wünnewil-Flamatt, Switzerland
- Height: 5 ft 9 in (175 cm)
- Weight: 185 lb (84 kg; 13 st 3 lb)
- Position: Forward
- Shoots: Left
- NL team: SC Bern
- National team: Switzerland
- Playing career: 2009–present

Tristan Scherwey (born 7 May 1991) is a Swiss professional ice hockey winger who is currently playing for SC Bern of the National League (NL). He served as captain of the team for the 2014–15 season. He won five NL titles with Bern in 2010, 2013, 2016, 2017 and 2019. Scherwey also won the Swiss Cup with Bern in 2015. Scherwey represented Switzerland at the 2018 Winter Olympics and won a silver medal at the 2018 World Championship.

== Playing career ==
Scherwey made his professional debut in the 2008–09 season with Young-Sprinters HC, playing 11 games in the Swiss League (SL) on loan from SC Bern's under-20 team. The following season, he made his debut in the National League (NL), appearing in 36 games with SC Bern and putting up 6 points, including 3 goals. On 29 November 2009, Scherwey was suspended for two games by the SIHF for a boarding on Genève-Servette HC's John Gobbi who was knocked unconscious and transported to Bern's hospital. On 23 April 2010, Scherwey was suspended for the next NL final game against Genève-Servette HC for a boarding on Daniel Vukovic. He played his last junior games with Bern U20 team in 2011, the same year he turned pro, signing a two-year contract with SC Bern.

On 9 August 2012, Scherwey agreed to a two-year contract extension to remain in Bern. On 5 April 2013, Scherwey was suspended for one game for a check to the head of HC Fribourg-Gottéron's Benjamin Plüss. The suspension was then brought up to two more games. Fribourg-Gottéron still appealed the decision and Scherwey was eventually suspended four games.

On 29 September 2014, Scherwey was signed to a five-year contract extension by Bern. On 3 January 2015, Scherwey was suspended for one game for a check to the head of Lausanne HC's Gaetan Augsburger. The suspension was then brought up to five games by the SIHF. On 14 January 2016, Scherwey was suspended for three games for a check to the head of Genève-Servette HC's Daniel Rubin and was also fined CHF 1,750 for the incident. On 29 March 2016, Scherwey was suspended for the first game of the NL final against HC Lugano for a check to the head of HC Davos's Marcus Paulsson during the playoffs semi-finals. He was also fined CHF 1,450. On 5 September 2016, Scherwey was suspended for one game by the IIHF for a check to the head in a CHL game against Kosice HC. On 3 November 2016, Scherwey was fined CHF 900 for a simulation. On 24 November 2016, Scherwey was suspended for one game and fined CHF 1,910 for an Interference on EHC Kloten's Daniele Grassi.

On February 6, 2019, Scherwey agreed to a seven-year contract extension with Bern worth CHF 4.9 million through the 2026/2027 season. At the conclusion of the 2018-19 season, Scherwey was voted by the fans as the league's Most Popular Player.

Scherwey was invited to attend the Ottawa Senators' main training camp in September 2019, forcing him to miss SC Bern's first 8 games of the 2019/20 NL regular season. His contract situation with Bern prevented him from signing a deal with any other team, including an NHL team. An NHL-out clause will be available in his new contract when it kicks off in the summer of 2020.

== International play ==
Medal record

Representing Switzerland

Ice hockey

World Championships
Silver medal – second place	2018 Denmark	
Silver medal – second place	2024 Czechia	

World Junior A Challenge
Bronze medal – third place	2010 Penticton	

Scherwey was named to Switzerland's under-18 team for the 2009 IIHF World U18 Championships in the United States. He played 6 games, tallying 5 points (3 goals) to help Switzerland avoid relegation. Scherwey was named to Switzerland's under-20 team for the 2010 World Junior Ice Hockey Championships in Canada. He played 7 games, scoring 3 points (1 goal) to help Switzerland finish 4th in the tournament, falling to Canada in the semi-finals. He was again named to the team for the 2011 edition. He played 5 games, scoring no point as Switzerland finished 5th in the tournament, falling to Canada in the quarter-finals.

Scherwey made his debut with Switzerland men's team in the 2012–13 season and scored his first goal in 2015. He represented Switzerland at the 2018 Winter Olympics, appearing in all 4 games. That same season, Scherwey also made his World Championship debut with the men's team at the 2018 IIHF World Championship in Denmark where he tallied 4 points (2 goals) in 10 games as Switzerland won silver, falling to Sweden in the shootout. Scherwey made the team again for the 2019 IIHF World Championship in Slovakia and tallied 4 points (2 goals) in 8 games.

He represented Switzerland at the 2024 IIHF World Championship and won a silver medal.

== Personal life ==
Scherwey was born in Wunnewil-Flamatt, a municipality in the canton of Fribourg. He was an avid fan of HC Fribourg-Gottéron as a kid and attended games in the standing section. He speaks French, German and English fluently. Scherwey started playing hockey with HC Fribourg-Gottéron's youth teams before moving to Bern to play with SC Bern's under-17 and under-20 teams.

Scherwey has a brother, Cyrille, who also plays hockey. He is currently playing in the Premier League, the fourth tier of Swiss ice hockey, with the Argovia Stars.

== Career statistics ==
=== Regular season and playoffs ===
			Regular season					Playoffs
Season	Team	League	GP	G	A	Pts	PIM	GP	G	A	Pts	PIM
2006–07	HC Fribourg–Gottéron	SUI U17	28	16	30	46	80	—	—	—	—	—
2006–07	HC Fribourg–Gottéron	SUI U20	7	0	0	0	6	—	—	—	—	—
2007–08	SC Bern	SUI U17	24	14	13	27	94	10	5	6	11	55
2007–08	SC Bern	SUI U20	25	6	10	16	48	5	1	0	1	2
2008–09	SC Bern	SUI U20	33	10	19	29	75	11	5	4	9	24
2008–09	Young Sprinters HC	SUI.2	11	1	0	1	2	—	—	—	—	—
2009–10	SC Bern	SUI U20	5	4	9	13	8	3	4	2	6	18
2009–10	SC Bern	NLA	36	3	3	6	39	14	2	1	3	4
2010–11	SC Bern	SUI U20	2	0	3	3	4	7	1	2	3	36
2010–11	SC Bern	NLA	43	4	3	7	18	9	0	0	0	0
2011–12	SC Bern	NLA	48	2	7	9	18	16	1	2	3	6
2012–13	SC Bern	NLA	50	6	10	16	32	16	0	3	3	12
2013–14	SC Bern	NLA	49	15	10	25	36	—	—	—	—	—
2014–15	SC Bern	NLA	45	7	15	22	68	11	0	2	2	4
2015–16	SC Bern	NLA	33	5	6	11	30	14	5	1	6	6
2016–17	SC Bern	NLA	46	5	15	20	37	16	3	3	6	37
2017–18	SC Bern	NL	49	13	10	23	8	11	2	3	5	8
2018–19	SC Bern	NL	44	9	19	28	45	18	6	3	9	8
2019–20	SC Bern	NL	44	15	8	23	26	—	—	—	—	—
2020–21	SC Bern	NL	46	13	13	26	38	9	1	2	3	8
2021–22	SC Bern	NL	35	9	15	24	22	—	—	—	—	—
2022–23	SC Bern	NL	51	11	10	21	44	9	1	1	2	14
2023–24	SC Bern	NL	51	12	12	24	23	7	3	0	3	4
2024–25	SC Bern	NL	47	6	15	21	45	7	0	1	1	6
NL totals			717	135	171	306	529	157	24	22	46	117

=== International ===
Year	Team	Event	Result	GP	G	A	Pts	PIM
2009	Switzerland	U18	8th	6	3	2	5	14
2010	Switzerland	WJC	4th	7	1	2	3	8
2011	Switzerland	WJC	5th	5	0	0	0	28
2018	Switzerland	OG	10th	4	0	0	0	4
2018	Switzerland	WC	2nd place, silver medalist(s)	10	2	2	4	2
2019	Switzerland	WC	8th	8	2	2	4	2
2021	Switzerland	WC	6th	8	1	6	7	0
2022	Switzerland	WC	5th	5	0	3	3	0
2024	Switzerland	WC	2nd place, silver medalist(s)	9	1	1	2	0
Junior totals				18	4	4	8	50
Senior totals				44	6	14	20	8
