= Romain Loeffel =

Swiss ice hockey player

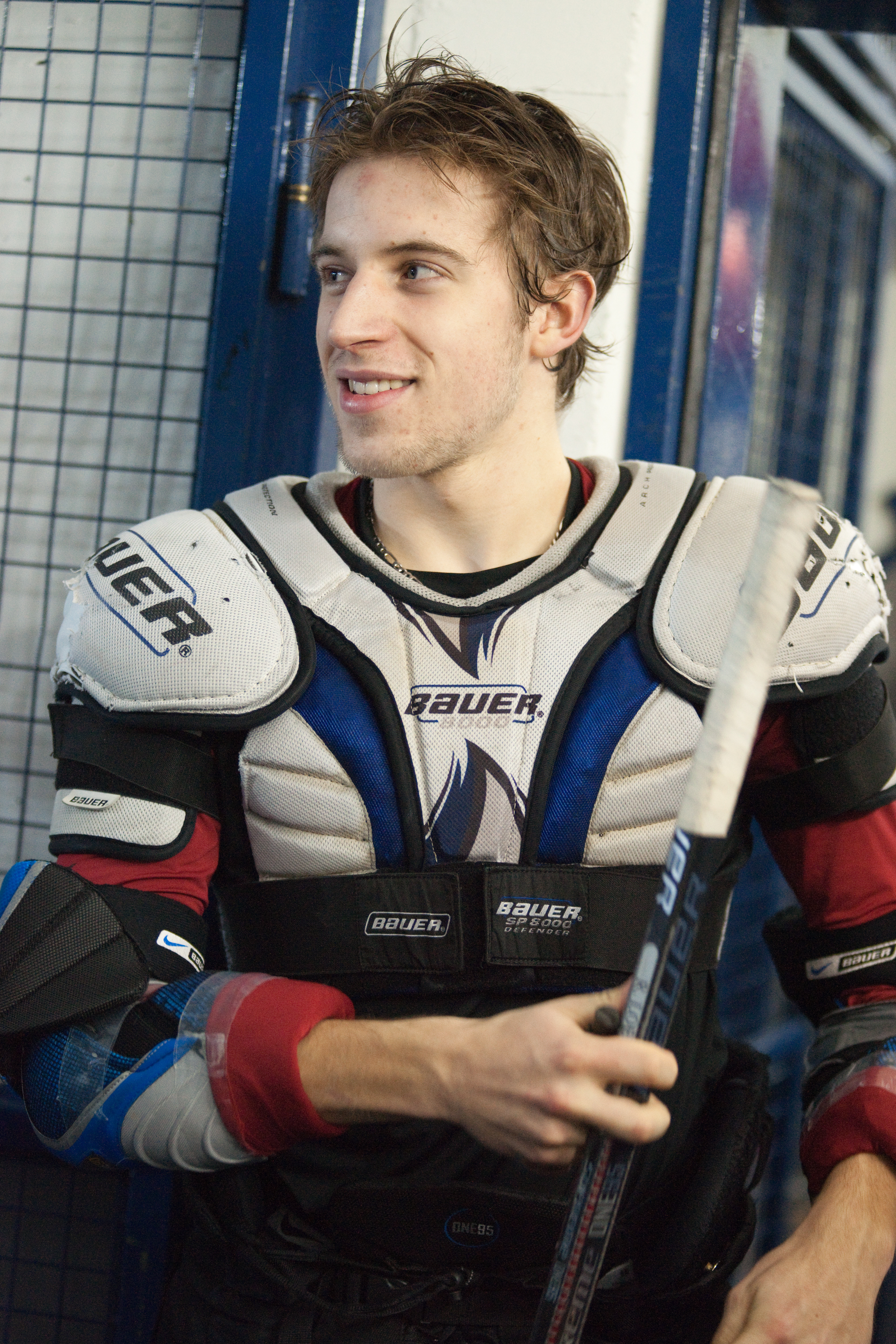
- Loeffel in 2010
- Born: 10 March 1991 (age 34) La Chaux-de-Fonds, Switzerland
- Height: 5 ft 10 in (178 cm)
- Weight: 180 lb (82 kg; 12 st 12 lb)
- Position: Defence
- Shoots: Right
- NL team Former teams: SC Bern; HC Fribourg-Gottéron; Genève-Servette HC; HC Lugano
- National team: Switzerland
- Playing career: 2008–present

Romain Loeffel (born 10 March 1991) is a Swiss professional ice hockey defenceman for SC Bern of the National League (NL). He previously played for HC Fribourg-Gottéron, Genève-Servette HC and HC Lugano.

== Playing career ==
Loeffel made his professional debut with HC Fribourg-Gottéron in the 2008-09 National League (NL) season. He appeared in 3 games this season and spent most of the year playing in the Swiss League (SL) with Young-Sprinters HC. He played 36 games in the SL and put up 14 points, including five goals. In the 2009-10 NL season, Loeffel became a regular on Fribourg's team, appearing in 37 NL contests that year. He went on to play four years with the team in the NL before being traded to Genève-Servette HC on 31 January 2014 for John Fritsche and Jérémie Kamerzin. Loeffel then appeared in only two games with Geneva that season, scoring 1 goal.

On 2 October 2014, Loeffel was suspended for seven games and fined CHF 10,000 for shoving a linesman in a game against Lausanne HC on 26 September 2014. Loeffel was trying to catch up Simon Fischer after a faceoff but bumped into Roger Bürgi, the linesman, and raised his stick to push him out of his way. Bürgi didn't report the incident at the end of the game, considering it an accident. It was only Reto Steinmann, who was at the head of the referees' supervision for the Swiss Ice Hockey Federation at the time, who watched the incident on tape and decided to open a procedure in order to suspend Loeffel. The case was highly mediatized in Switzerland.

On 2 December 2014, Loeffel was signed to a one-year contract extension by Geneva. He went on to score 4 points in 4 Spengler Cup games en route to the title with Geneva.

On 2 December 2015, Loeffel agreed to a two-year contract extension with Genève-Servette. At the end of the 2015–16 NL season, he was named to the NL Media Swiss All-Star Team.

On 16 October 2017, HC Lugano signed Loeffel to a four-year contract worth CHF 4.8 million. The contract will start for the 2018/19 season and run through the 2021/22 season.

== International play ==
Medal record

Representing Switzerland

Ice hockey

World Championships
Silver medal – second place	2024 Czechia	

Loeffel was named to Switzerland's national under-18 team for the 2008 IIHF World U18 Championships in Russia. He tallied one assist in 6 games, with Switzerland finishing 8th in the tournament. Loeffel was again named to the team for the 2009 IIHF World U18 Championships in the United States, where he put up four assists in 6 games, finishing again 8th in the tournament with Switzerland. That same year he was also named to Switzerland's under-20 team for the 2009 World Junior Ice Hockey Championships – Division I in Switzerland. He played five games to help Switzerland win the tournament and earn a promotion for the 2010 World Junior Ice Hockey Championships in which he did not participate but was selected to take part in the 2011 edition in the United States. Loeffel scored 1 goal, helping Switzerland finish 5th in that tournament.

Loeffel made his debut with Switzerland men's team in 2011 but only made his World Championships debut in 2015 in the Czech Republic. He was originally cut after the exhibition games but was re-called as an injury replacement when he was on holiday in Dubai. He eventually played two games in the tournament as Switzerland finished 8th. Loeffel was then named to the team for the 2017 IIHF World Championship in France and played all eight games, putting up 5 points, including 1 goal. Switzerland finished 6th in the tournament, falling to Sweden in the quarter-finals.

Loeffel represented Switzerland at the 2018 Winter Olympics. He appeared in 3 games, tallying one assist as Switzerland unexpectedly fell to Germany in the qualification game for the 1/4 finals.

He represented Switzerland at the 2024 IIHF World Championship and won a silver medal.

== Personal life ==
Loeffel was born and grew up in La Chaux-de-Fonds, where he started playing hockey as a kid with the local youth team, HC La Chaux-de-Fonds. At 15 years old, he moved to Fribourg to pursue his dream of becoming a professional hockey player.

== Career statistics ==
=== Regular season and playoffs ===
			Regular season					Playoffs
Season	Team	League	GP	G	A	Pts	PIM	GP	G	A	Pts	PIM
2006–07	HC Fribourg–Gottéron	SUI U17	27	5	11	16	120	—	—	—	—	—
2006–07	HC Fribourg–Gottéron	SUI U20	35	4	2	6	54	—	—	—	—	—
2007–08	HC Fribourg–Gottéron	SUI U17	9	8	5	13	18	—	—	—	—	—
2007–08	HC Fribourg–Gottéron	SUI U20	32	5	11	16	34	—	—	—	—	—
2007–08	HC Düdingen Bulls	SUI.3	6	0	0	0	2	—	—	—	—	—
2007–08	Switzerland U20	SUI.2	2	1	1	2	2	—	—	—	—	—
2008–09	HC Fribourg–Gottéron	SUI U20	12	4	7	11	41	13	0	7	7	14
2008–09	HC Fribourg–Gottéron	NLA	3	0	0	0	4	—	—	—	—	—
2008–09	Young Sprinters HC	SUI.2	36	5	9	14	46	—	—	—	—	—
2008–09	Switzerland U20	SUI.2	6	0	0	0	4	—	—	—	—	—
2009–10	HC Fribourg–Gottéron	SUI U20	16	3	9	12	20	—	—	—	—	—
2009–10	HC Fribourg–Gottéron	NLA	37	0	0	0	12	6	0	0	0	0
2009–10	Young Sprinters HC	SUI.2	3	0	2	2	4	—	—	—	—	—
2009–10	SC Langenthal	SUI.2	8	0	3	3	8	6	0	2	2	12
2010–11	HC Fribourg–Gottéron	NLA	42	6	9	15	16	4	1	0	1	2
2011–12	HC Fribourg–Gottéron	NLA	49	5	12	17	28	11	1	5	6	4
2012–13	HC Fribourg–Gottéron	NLA	34	3	10	13	22	18	1	5	6	4
2013–14	HC Fribourg–Gottéron	NLA	43	1	5	6	20	—	—	—	—	—
2013–14	Genève–Servette HC	NLA	2	1	0	1	2	—	—	—	—	—
2014–15	Genève–Servette HC	NLA	43	8	21	29	22	12	2	8	10	2
2015–16	Genève–Servette HC	NLA	50	6	27	33	52	11	3	4	7	10
2016–17	Genève–Servette HC	NLA	50	10	26	36	18	4	1	0	1	0
2017–18	Genève–Servette HC	NL	48	10	14	24	22	5	1	1	2	4
2018–19	HC Lugano	NL	48	10	22	32	20	4	2	1	3	0
2019–20	HC Lugano	NL	50	7	16	23	28	—	—	—	—	—
2020–21	HC Lugano	NL	50	3	20	23	50	5	2	3	5	0
2021–22	HC Lugano	NL	33	9	12	21	42	6	0	0	0	4
2022–23	SC Bern	NL	41	3	22	25	16	9	2	2	4	4
2023–24	SC Bern	NL	51	4	22	26	51	7	1	0	1	4
2024–25	SC Bern	NL	46	12	23	35	14	7	0	3	3	0
NL totals			720	98	261	359	439	109	17	32	49	38

=== International ===
Year	Team	Event	Result	GP	G	A	Pts	PIM
2008	Switzerland	U18	8th	6	0	1	1	18
2009	Switzerland	WJC D1	11th	5	0	0	0	0
2009	Switzerland	U18	8th	6	0	4	4	12
2011	Switzerland	WJC	5th	6	1	0	1	4
2015	Switzerland	WC	8th	2	0	0	0	0
2017	Switzerland	WC	6th	8	1	4	5	8
2018	Switzerland	OG	10th	3	0	1	1	0
2019	Switzerland	WC	8th	8	1	2	3	2
2021	Switzerland	WC	6th	7	3	1	4	2
2022	Switzerland	OG	8th	5	1	0	1	2
2023	Switzerland	WC	5th	8	2	1	3	2
2024	Switzerland	WC	2nd place, silver medalist(s)	10	2	5	7	2
Junior totals				23	1	5	6	34
Senior totals				51	10	14	24	18
