= Kevin Romy =

Swiss ice hockey player

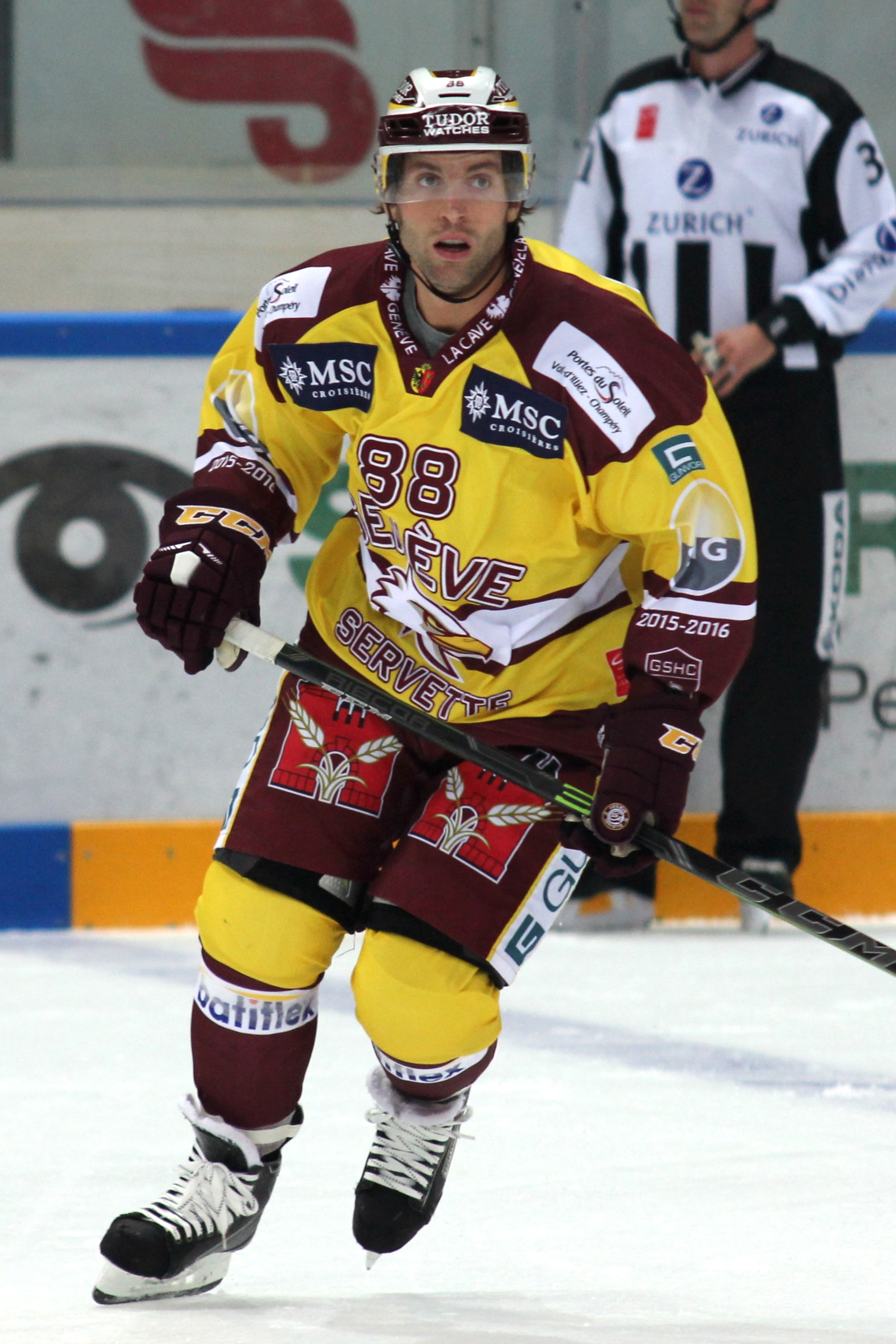
- Born: 31 January 1985 (age 41) La Chaux-de-Fonds, Switzerland
- Height: 6 ft 0 in (183 cm)
- Weight: 190 lb (86 kg; 13 st 8 lb)
- Position: Centre
- Shot: Left
- Played for: HC La Chaux-de-Fonds; Genève-Servette HC; HC Lugano
- National team: Switzerland
- NHL draft: 108th overall, 2003; Philadelphia Flyers
- Playing career: 2000–2019

Kevin Romy (born 31 January 1985) is a Swiss former professional ice hockey centre who played in the National League (NL) for Genève-Servette HC and HC Lugano. Romy was drafted by the Philadelphia Flyers in the 4th round (108th overall) in the 2003 NHL entry draft. Romy also represented Switzerland at the 2014 Winter Olympics.

Romy won one NL title as a member of HC Lugano in 2006. He also won two Spengler Cup titles with Genève-Servette in 2013 and 2014

== Playing career ==
Romy started playing hockey in his hometown, La Chaux-de-Fonds, with the junior team. He made his professional debut in the National League (NL) with HC La Chaux-de-Fonds in the 2000/01 season. He appeared in 17 regular season games, failing to score a single point. He then played 2 games (0 point) in the relegation round to conclude his first professional season. HC La Chaux-de-Fonds lost the relegation round, sending the team back to the Swiss League (SL) after only one season in the NL. Despite relegation, Romy remained with the team putting up 23 points in 35 regular season games and then added 10 points in 10 playoffs games at only 17 years old. At the end of the season, Romy drew interest from NL powerhouse, Genève-Servette HC, which signed him to a multi-year contract in the summer of 2002.

He suited up in 35 regular season games with Geneva the following season, racking up 4 points. He remained in the lineup for the 2003 playoffs, playing 6 games, scoring no point. Romy eventually played three full seasons with Geneva, before being shipped to HC Lugano 2 games into the 2005–06 season and with three years remaining on his contract. On 3 December 2008, Romy was signed to a three-year contract extension by Lugano.

On 8 December 2011, Romy agreed to a two-year contract with Genève-Servette HC for the 2012/13 season, leaving Lugano after seven seasons and one NL title. He won the Spengler Cup with Geneva on December 31, 2013, scoring 4 points in 4 games.

On 16 January 2014, Romy signed a two-year contract extension with Geneva. He participated in Geneva's back-to-back title at the Spengler Cup, tallying 2 points in 4 games in the 2014 edition.

On 14 September 2016, Romy was signed to a four-year contract extension by the Eagles which will keep him in Geneva until the end of the 2020–21 season.

On 15 June 2017, Romy was named captain of Genève-Servette. At the end of the 2017–18 season, he was stripped of the captaincy and Noah Rod took over as captain of the team.

Following the 2018–19 season, after two injury plagued seasons in a row, Romy opted to end his 19-year professional career on 23 July 2019.

== International play ==
Romy was named to Switzerland's under-18 team for the 2002 IIHF World U18 Championships in Slovakia. He managed to score 14 points, including 9 goals in 8 games, helping Switzerland to avoid relegation. He was again named to the team for the 2003 IIHF World U18 Championships in Russia. He put up 12 points in 6 games as Switzerland was relegated.

Romy was selected to play in the 2003 IIHF World U20 Championship in Canada with Switzerland's under-20 team. He played 6 games and scored 5 points as Switzerland won the relegation round. He played 1 game in the 2004 IIHF World U20 Championship in Finland as Switzerland was again saved from relegation. He played 6 games scoring 5 points in the 2005 IIHF World U20 Championship in the United States, helping Switzerland to remain in the elite in his final junior year.

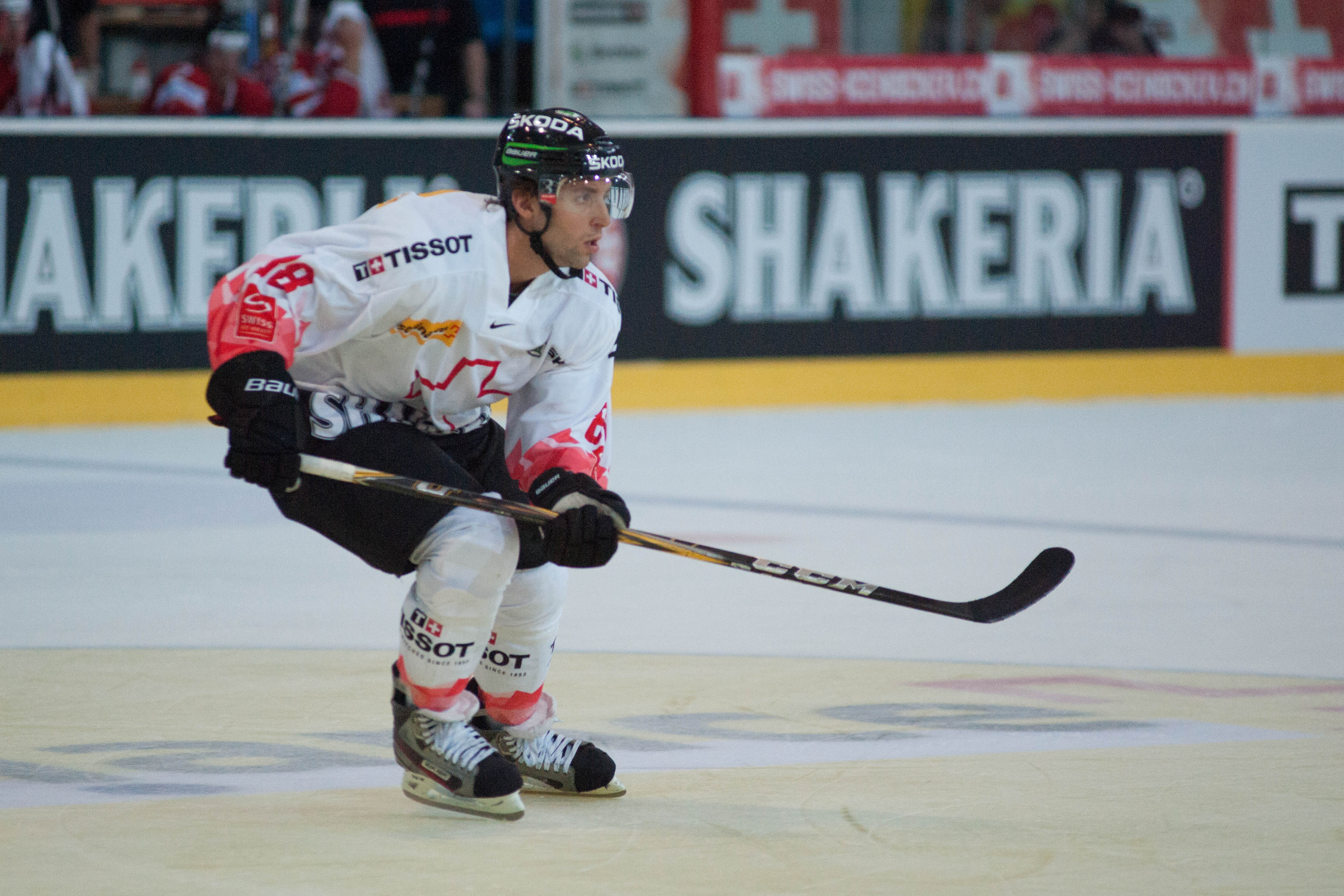
Romy representing Switzerland on 29 April 2012.

Romy made his debut with Switzerland men's team in the 2004–05 season. He earned a spot on the team for the 2005 IIHF World Championship in Austria as Switzerland fell to Sweden in the quarter-finals. He played a total of 25 games with the men's team this season, failing to score a single point. Romy was also selected to represent Switzerland for the 2006, 2009, 2010, 2012, 2014 and 2015 editions. He was also selected to represent Switzerland at the 2014 Winter Olympics where he tallied 1 assist in 4 games as Switzerland lost to Latvia in the qualifying game for the quarter-finals.

== Personal life ==
Romy has 2 daughters with his wife, Marine.

His cousin is Thomas Déruns who played more than 750 games in the NL.

== Career statistics ==
=== Regular season and playoffs ===
			Regular season					Playoffs
Season	Team	League	GP	G	A	Pts	PIM	GP	G	A	Pts	PIM
2000–01	HC La Chaux–de–Fonds	SUI.2 U20	—	—	—	—	—	—	—	—	—	—
2000–01	HC La Chaux–de–Fonds	NLA	17	0	0	0	0	—	—	—	—	—
2001–02	HC Lugano	SUI U20	1	0	0	0	0	—	—	—	—	—
2001–02	HC La Chaux–de–Fonds	SUI.2 U20	1	0	0	0	0	—	—	—	—	—
2001–02	HC La Chaux–de–Fonds	SUI.2	35	10	13	23	12	10	5	5	10	6
2002–03	Genève–Servette HC	NLA	35	2	2	4	18	6	0	0	0	2
2002–03	HC La Chaux–de–Fonds	SUI.2	1	0	0	0	0	—	—	—	—	—
2003–04	Genève–Servette HC	NLA	39	6	8	14	10	12	1	2	3	6
2004–05	Genève–Servette HC	NLA	41	10	12	22	18	4	0	0	0	2
2005–06	Genève–Servette HC	NLA	2	2	1	3	0	—	—	—	—	—
2005–06	HC Lugano	NLA	36	9	8	17	53	15	2	1	3	8
2006–07	HC Lugano	NLA	40	7	17	24	56	4	0	1	1	33
2007–08	HC Lugano	NLA	50	10	12	22	51	—	—	—	—	—
2008–09	HC Lugano	NLA	45	9	19	28	47	5	0	2	2	2
2009–10	HC Lugano	NLA	37	7	11	18	28	2	0	0	0	0
2010–11	HC Lugano	NLA	48	8	11	19	24	—	—	—	—	—
2011–12	HC Lugano	NLA	44	18	21	39	10	6	1	2	3	0
2012–13	Genève–Servette HC	NLA	50	15	19	34	10	7	3	1	4	4
2013–14	Genève–Servette HC	NLA	49	11	23	34	14	12	3	3	6	8
2014–15	Genève–Servette HC	NLA	48	18	15	33	16	6	0	1	1	0
2015–16	Genève–Servette HC	NLA	49	11	23	34	12	11	5	8	13	16
2016–17	Genève–Servette HC	NLA	23	4	8	12	8	4	0	0	0	2
2017–18	Genève–Servette HC	NL	41	8	12	20	14	5	0	0	0	0
2018–19	Genève–Servette HC	NL	32	3	13	16	8	6	2	0	2	0
NLA/NL totals			726	158	235	393	397	105	17	21	38	83

=== International ===
Year	Team	Event	GP	G	A	Pts	PIM
2002	Switzerland	WJC18	8	9	5	14	4
2003	Switzerland	WJC	6	2	3	5	0
2003	Switzerland	WJC18	6	4	8	12	4
2004	Switzerland	WJC	1	0	0	0	0
2005	Switzerland	WJC	6	3	2	5	8
2005	Switzerland	OGQ	3	0	0	0	0
2005	Switzerland	WC	7	0	0	0	0
2006	Switzerland	WC	6	0	0	0	2
2009	Switzerland	WC	6	0	0	0	0
2010	Switzerland	WC	7	0	1	1	4
2012	Switzerland	WC	7	1	5	6	2
2014	Switzerland	OG	4	0	1	1	0
2014	Switzerland	WC	6	1	2	3	4
2015	Switzerland	WC	8	0	1	1	2
Junior totals			27	18	18	36	16
Senior totals			54	2	10	12	14
