= Inti Pestoni =

Swiss professional ice hockey player (born 1991)

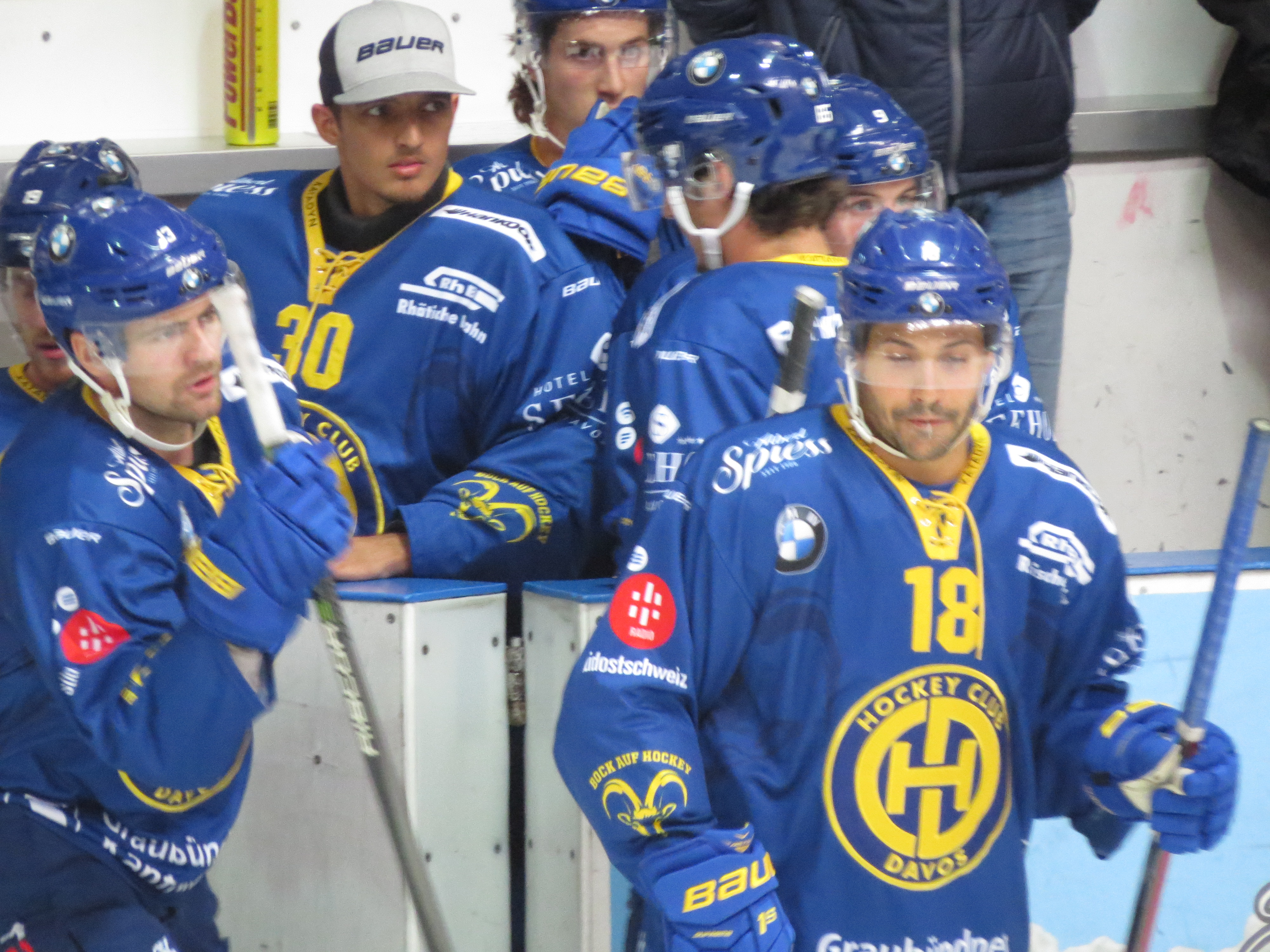
- Born: August 8, 1991 (age 34) Faido, Switzerland
- Height: 5 ft 8 in (173 cm)
- Weight: 180 lb (82 kg; 12 st 12 lb)
- Position: Winger
- Shoots: Left
- NL team Former teams: HC Ambrì-Piotta; ZSC Lions; HC Davos; SC Bern
- Playing career: 2009–present

Medal record

Ice hockey

Representing Switzerland

World Junior A Challenge
Bronze medal – third place	2010 Penticton	

Inti Pestoni (born August 8, 1991) is a Swiss professional ice hockey winger who is currently playing with HC Ambrì-Piotta of the National League (NL).

== Playing career ==
Brought up as a youth within the Ambri-Piotta club, Pestoni was re-signed to a further two-year contract extension on February 27, 2012, to remain under contract with Ambri until 2016.

In December 2013, Pestoni was loaned to Genève-Servette HC for the 2013 Spengler Cup, which he would eventually win. He played a huge role in the title, tallying 4 points (1G/3A) in 4 games. He was again loaned to the reigning champion for the 2014 edition and scored 3 goals to lead Geneva to its second title. He was also named to the tournament All-Star Team.

After 8 seasons and 330 games with Ambri-Piotta, Pestoni agreed to a three-year contract with the ZSC Lions.

On October 5, 2016, the ZSC Lions announced that Pestoni would be suspended for five weeks due to poor physical conditions. During that span, he'll have to participate in an intensive off-ice training in order to lose weight and increase his fitness level. Pestoni eventually returned to game action on November 11, 2016, against his former team, HC Ambrì-Piotta, at the Valascia. The day after that, on November 12, 2016, Pestoni scored his first goal since his return.

In April 2018, Pestoni won the Swiss championship with the Lions, appearing in only 6 postseason games and scoring no point.

On May 23, 2018, the ZSC Lions announced that Pestoni would no longer be playing for the team -despite one year remaining on his contract- and that he could either find a new team or report to their affiliate, the GCK Lions of the Swiss League. Should he fail to sign a contract with a new organization, he would still be paid the remaining CHF 750,000 on his contract. Pestoni played 84 regular season games with Zurich (35 points) as well as 12 postseason contests (1 goal) over 2 seasons.

On June 5, 2018, Pestoni signed a one-year contract worth CHF 500,000 with HC Davos for the 2018–19 season with an option for the following season. Pestoni made his return to the Swiss national team while playing for Davos, appearing in two games (one goal) at the Lucern Cup in December.

On January 4, 2019, Pestoni decided to forgo his option with Davos by signing a two-year deal worth CHF 1.2 million with SC Bern beginning in the 2019–20 season. Despite struggling with injuries in his first season with Bern, Pestoni still managed to score 10 goals (17 points) over 36 regular season games. Pestoni entered the final year of his contract in 2020-21 with rumors that he might be returning to HC Ambri-Piotta at the end of the season. On November 24, 2020, SC Bern's GM Florence Schelling told the media that Pestoni would not be returning to the team for the 2021-22 season.

On May 7, 2021, Pestoni officially returned to HC Ambri-Piotta on a four-year deal through the 2024/25 season.

== Personal life ==
Pestoni is a huge soccer fan and roots for both the Swiss national team and AC Milan.

On January 8, 2017, Pestoni missed his team's afternoon game as his girlfriend Carolina gave birth to the couple's first child.

== Career statistics ==
=== Regular season and playoffs ===
			Regular season					Playoffs
Season	Team	League	GP	G	A	Pts	PIM	GP	G	A	Pts	PIM
2009–10	HC Ambrì-Piotta	NL	17	2	0	2	0	—	—	—	—	—
2010–11	HC Ambrì-Piotta	NL	42	11	16	27	4	—	—	—	—	—
2011–12	HC Ambrì-Piotta	NL	38	10	16	26	12	—	—	—	—	—
2012–13	HC Ambrì-Piotta	NL	43	9	20	29	30	—	—	—	—	—
2013–14	HC Ambrì-Piotta	NL	49	7	29	36	36	4	1	1	2	0
2014–15	HC Ambrì-Piotta	NL	30	9	15	24	24	—	—	—	—	—
2015–16	HC Ambrì-Piotta	NL	50	15	25	40	12	—	—	—	—	—
2016–17	ZSC Lions	NL	39	7	5	12	6	6	1	0	1	2
2017–18	ZSC Lions	NL	45	6	17	23	12	6	0	0	0	0
2018–19	HC Davos	NL	48	10	18	28	14	—	—	—	—	—
2019–20	SC Bern	NL	36	10	7	17	4	—	—	—	—	—
2020–21	SC Bern	NL	45	11	11	22	12	9	1	4	5	4
2021–22	HC Ambrì-Piotta	NL	52	16	23	39	10	3	1	1	2	0
2022–23	HC Ambrì-Piotta	NL	51	13	29	42	18	—	—	—	—	—
2023–24	HC Ambrì-Piotta	NL	47	12	19	31	33	4	1	0	1	6
2024–25	HC Ambrì-Piotta	NL	49	7	14	21	8	4	1	1	2	0
NL totals			681	155	264	419	235	36	6	7	13	12

=== International ===
Year	Team	Event	GP	G	A	Pts	PIM
2011	Switzerland	WJC	6	5	2	7	0
Junior totals			6	5	2	7	0
