= Marc-Antoine Pouliot =

Canadian ice hockey player (born 1985)

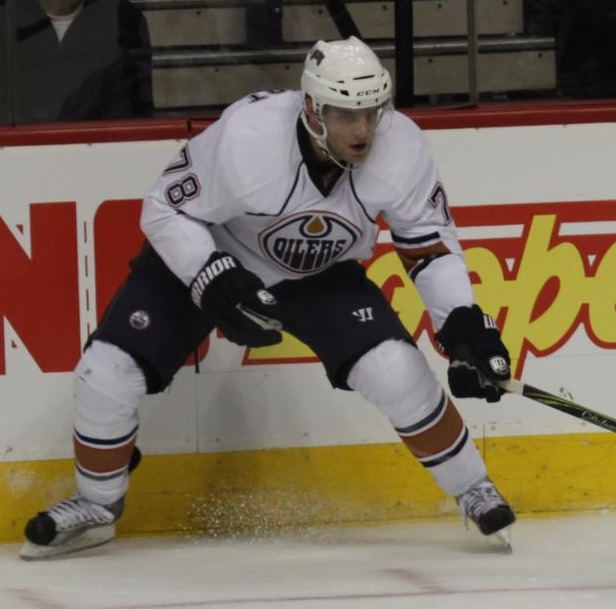
- Pouliot with the Edmonton Oilers in 2010
- Born: May 22, 1985 (age 41) Quebec City, Quebec, Canada
- Height: 6 ft 1 in (185 cm)
- Weight: 195 lb (88 kg; 13 st 13 lb)
- Position: Centre
- Shoots: Right
- NL team Former teams: Genève-Servette HC; Edmonton Oilers; Tampa Bay Lightning; Phoenix Coyotes; EHC Biel; HC Fribourg-Gottéron
- National team: Canada
- NHL draft: 22nd overall, 2003; Edmonton Oilers
- Playing career: 2005–present

Marc-Antoine Pouliot (born May 22, 1985) is a Canadian professional ice hockey player who is currently playing with Genève-Servette HC of the National League (NL). He was selected 22nd overall by the Edmonton Oilers in the 2003 NHL entry draft.

== Playing career ==
=== Junior ===
As a youth, Pouliot played in the 1998 and 1999 Quebec International Pee-Wee Hockey Tournaments with a minor ice hockey team from Quebec City.

Pouliot spent his junior career with the Rimouski Océanic of the Quebec Major Junior Hockey League (QMJHL). In addition to playing for Canada's under-18 team in 2003, he spent two seasons as the captain of the Océanic. His final junior year was spent on a line with Sidney Crosby. Although naturally a centre, Pouliot switched to left-wing to allow Crosby to play his natural position.

=== Professional ===
After a relatively successful training camp with the Oilers, Pouliot was assigned to the Hamilton Bulldogs of the American Hockey League (AHL) where he made his professional debut. The Edmonton Oilers called him up to their team on March 13, 2006 and Pouliot was set to play on March 18, 2006 against the Red Wings, but was scratched when forward Ethan Moreau returned from a sprained ankle. He played just over 10 minutes in his first NHL game on March 30, 2006 with the Oilers against the Los Angeles Kings. He scored his first NHL goal four nights later on April 3 in Edmonton vs. the Phoenix Coyotes.

Splitting time between the Wilkes-Barre Penguins and the Oilers during the 2006–07 campaign, Pouliot scored four goals with seven assists for the Oilers. He would then split time with the Oilers and the Springfield Falcons during the 2007–08 season. In his first full season with the Oilers, Pouliot appeared in 63 games, recording 20 points.

On July 23, 2010, Pouliot signed a 1-year two-way deal with the Tampa Bay Lightning.

He was traded to the Phoenix Coyotes for a seventh round pick in the 2011 NHL entry draft on June 25, 2011. In the 2011–12 season, Pouliot started the year with affiliate the Portland Pirates. He appeared in 13 games for the Coyotes throughout the season before finding a regular fourth line role in the playoffs, appearing in a career high 8 games.

On June 1, 2012, Pouliot signed a one-year deal with EHC Biel of the National League A. Upon NHL interest with the option to leave the club before the 5th of July, Pouliot was later officially released as a free agent by the Arizona Coyotes on June 26.

After the conclusion of his first Swiss season in which he contributed with 40 points in 48 games, Pouliot returned to remain in the NLA, however signing a two-year deal with rivals HC Fribourg-Gottéron on May 17, 2013.

On May 13, 2021, Pouliot joined Genève-Servette HC on a one-year deal with an option for a second season.

He has played with this team through the 2025-2026 season, winning a championship in 2022-23.

== Career statistics ==
=== Regular season and playoffs ===
			Regular season					Playoffs
Season	Team	League	GP	G	A	Pts	PIM	GP	G	A	Pts	PIM
2000–01	Ste–Foy Gouverneurs	QMAAA	38	16	39	55	52	16	8	12	20	16
2001–02	Rimouski Océanic	QMJHL	28	9	14	23	32	5	0	0	0	4
2002–03	Rimouski Océanic	QMJHL	65	32	41	73	100	—	—	—	—	—
2003–04	Rimouski Océanic	QMJHL	42	25	33	58	62	9	5	7	12	12
2004–05	Rimouski Océanic	QMJHL	70	45	69	114	83	13	4	15	19	8
2005–06	Edmonton Oilers	NHL	8	1	0	1	0	—	—	—	—	—
2005–06	Hamilton Bulldogs	AHL	65	15	30	45	63	—	—	—	—	—
2006–07	Edmonton Oilers	NHL	46	4	7	11	18	—	—	—	—	—
2006–07	Wilkes–Barre/Scranton Penguins	AHL	33	14	17	31	20	11	5	5	10	4
2007–08	Edmonton Oilers	NHL	24	1	6	7	12	—	—	—	—	—
2007–08	Springfield Falcons	AHL	55	21	26	47	47	—	—	—	—	—
2008–09	Edmonton Oilers	NHL	63	8	12	20	23	—	—	—	—	—
2009–10	Edmonton Oilers	NHL	35	7	7	14	21	—	—	—	—	—
2009–10	Springfield Falcons	AHL	4	1	5	6	12	—	—	—	—	—
2010–11	Tampa Bay Lightning	NHL	3	0	0	0	0	—	—	—	—	—
2010–11	Norfolk Admirals	AHL	69	25	47	72	53	6	4	3	7	4
2011–12	Phoenix Coyotes	NHL	13	0	4	4	2	8	1	1	2	2
2011–12	Portland Pirates	AHL	48	12	24	36	63	—	—	—	—	—
2012–13	EHC Biel–Bienne	NLA	48	9	31	40	86	7	3	4	7	18
2013–14	HC Fribourg–Gottéron	NLA	40	8	22	30	38	10	2	7	9	6
2014–15	HC Fribourg–Gottéron	NLA	49	19	24	43	66	—	—	—	—	—
2015–16	HC Fribourg–Gottéron	NLA	26	8	16	24	30	5	1	6	7	2
2016–17	HC Fribourg–Gottéron	NLA	8	1	2	3	6	—	—	—	—	—
2016–17	EHC Biel–Bienne	NLA	28	12	17	29	16	5	0	2	2	38
2017–18	EHC Biel–Bienne	NL	47	13	29	42	89	12	2	8	10	12
2018–19	EHC Biel–Bienne	NL	44	14	19	33	48	7	1	2	3	6
2019–20	EHC Biel–Bienne	NL	35	12	16	28	28	—	—	—	—	—
2020–21	EHC Biel–Bienne	NL	43	15	17	32	48	—	—	—	—	—
2021–22	Genève-Servette HC	NL	27	11	9	20	24	2	0	0	0	0
NHL totals			192	21	36	57	76	8	1	1	2	2
NL totals			395	122	202	324	479	48	9	29	38	82

=== International ===
Year	Team	Event	Result	GP	G	A	Pts	PIM
2003	Canada	WJC18	1st place, gold medalist(s)	7	2	7	9	6
2012	Canada	SC	1st place, gold medalist(s)	3	1	0	1	0
2014	Canada	SC	4th	4	1	5	6	2
2016	Canada	SC	1st place, gold medalist(s)	5	2	4	6	4
Junior totals				7	2	7	9	6
Senior totals				12	4	9	13	6

Awards and achievements
Preceded by Jesse Niinimaki	Edmonton Oilers first-round draft pick 2003	Succeeded by Devan Dubnyk
