= Daniel Rubin =

Swiss ice hockey player (born 1985)

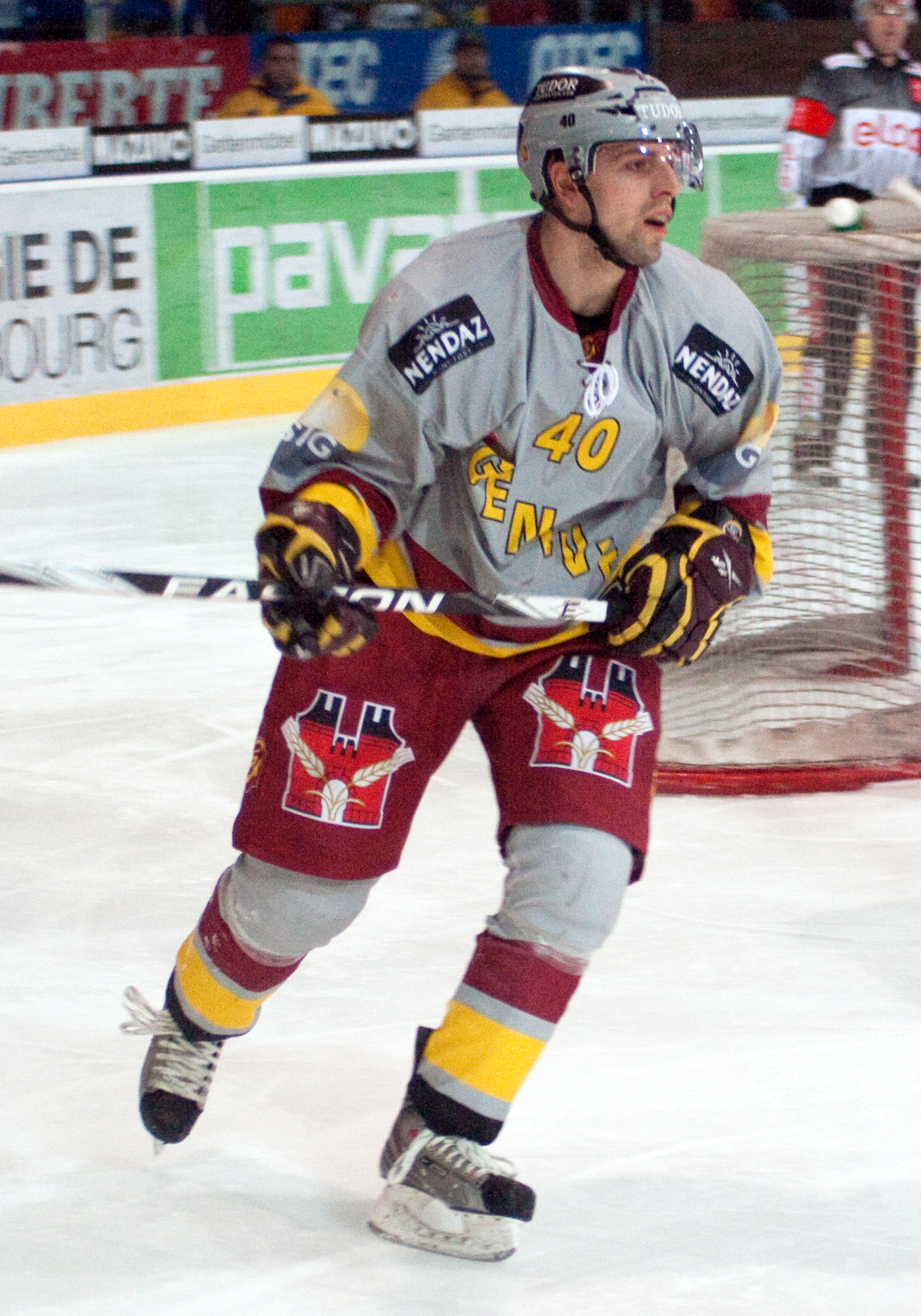
- Born: July 29, 1985 (age 41) Bern, Switzerland
- Height: 5 ft 11 in (180 cm)
- Weight: 185 lb (84 kg; 13 st 3 lb)
- Position: Forward
- Shot: Right
- NL team Former teams: free agent SC Bern; EHC Biel; EHC Basel; Genève-Servette HC
- National team: Switzerland
- NHL draft: Undrafted
- Playing career: 2002–2019

Daniel Rubin (born July 29, 1985) is a Swiss former professional ice hockey player.

== Playing career ==
Rubin made his professional debut with EHC Biel playing 41 games in the 2003-04 Swiss League (SL) season. He won 3 Swiss League titles with Biel in 2004, 2006 and 2007.

Rubin then moved to EHC Basel and played his first National League (NL) game in 2007.

In the summer of 2008, Rubin joined Genève-Servette HC where he played 4 seasons before joining SC Bern for the 2012-13 season, he won his first NL title in his first year with Bern. He played one more year in Bern and had to fight relegation at the end of the 2013-14 season.

Rubin then rejoined his former team, Genève-Servette HC on a two-year deal. He won the 2014 Spengler Cup while playing with Geneva. On August 3, 2016, he was signed to a two-year contract extension by Geneva.

== International play ==
Rubin was named to Switzerland men's team for the 2011 IIHF World Championship and the 2012 IIHF World Championship. He played a total of 7 games over those 2 tournaments, failing to score any point.

== Career statistics ==
			Regular season					Playoffs
Season	Team	League	GP	G	A	Pts	PIM	GP	G	A	Pts	PIM
2000–01	SC Bern U20	Elite Jr. A	3	1	0	1	2	—	—	—	—	—
2001–02	SC Bern U20	Elite Jr. A	29	6	8	14	61	—	—	—	—	—
2002–03	SC Bern U20	Elite Jr. A	36	25	13	38	24	3	0	0	0	0
2002–03	EHC Rot-Blau Bern	SwissDiv1	4	1	0	1	—	—	—	—	—	—
2003–04	SC Bern U20	Elite Jr. A	16	10	2	12	80	—	—	—	—	—
2003–04	EHC Biel-Bienne	NLB	41	11	4	15	16	18	2	3	5	8
2004–05	EHC Biel-Bienne	NLB	31	10	9	19	18	12	0	3	3	14
2004–05	EHC Biel-Bienne U20	Elite Jr. A	14	22	13	35	61	—	—	—	—	—
2005–06	EHC Biel-Bienne	NLB	42	13	15	28	40	20	8	4	12	14
2006–07	EHC Biel-Bienne	NLB	44	22	23	45	97	17	3	7	10	18
2007–08	EHC Basel	NLA	39	3	3	6	24	—	—	—	—	—
2008–09	Genève-Servette HC	NLA	43	6	11	17	36	4	0	0	0	6
2009–10	Genève-Servette HC	NLA	50	17	16	33	93	20	5	5	10	51
2010–11	Genève-Servette HC	NLA	1	0	1	1	0	5	2	1	3	18
2011–12	Genève-Servette HC	NLA	50	12	17	29	74	—	—	—	—	—
2012–13	SC Bern	NLA	48	1	8	9	38	18	0	2	2	16
2013–14	SC Bern	NLA	43	0	4	4	30	—	—	—	—	—
2014–15	Genève-Servette HC	NLA	46	11	16	27	22	12	1	3	4	18
2015–16	Genève-Servette HC	NLA	48	10	11	21	28	7	0	2	2	8
2016–17	Genève-Servette HC	NLA	44	6	3	9	38	4	0	0	0	12
2017–18	Genève-Servette HC	NL	42	3	3	6	32	3	0	1	1	2
2018–19	Genève-Servette HC	NL	38	6	1	7	34	6	0	1	1	4
NLA totals			492	75	95	170	449	79	8	15	23	129
NLB totals			158	56	51	107	171	67	13	17	30	54
