= Cody Almond =

Canadian-born Swiss ice hockey player

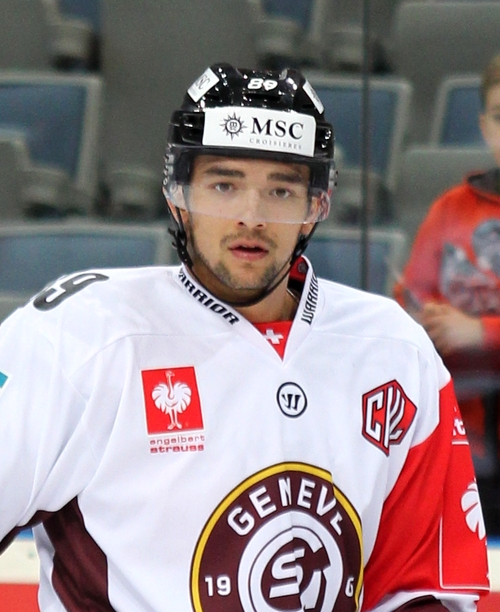
- Born: July 24, 1989 (age 37) Calgary, Alberta, Canada
- Height: 6 ft 2 in (188 cm)
- Weight: 199 lb (90 kg; 14 st 3 lb)
- Position: Centre
- Shot: Left
- NL team Former teams: Lausanne HC; Minnesota Wild; Genève-Servette HC
- National team: Switzerland
- NHL draft: 140th overall, 2007; Minnesota Wild
- Playing career: 2009–2024

Cody Almond (born July 24, 1989) is a Canadian-born Swiss former professional ice hockey centre who last played for Lausanne HC of the National League (NL). He previously played for the Minnesota Wild in the National Hockey League (NHL).

== Playing career ==
Almond was originally selected by the Minnesota Wild in the fifth round, 140th overall in the 2007 NHL entry draft from the Kelowna Rockets of the Western Hockey League. He made his NHL debut on February 12, 2010 against the Atlanta Thrashers, and scored his first goal on April 4, 2010 against the Vancouver Canucks.

Almond started the 2010–11 season with Minnesota's AHL affiliate, the Houston Aeros, but was recalled to the NHL on November 4, 2010.

On June 20, 2012, Almond left the Wild organization for Europe and was signed to a three-year contract with HC Genève-Servette of the Swiss National League A.

In his second season with Genève-Servette in 2013–14, Almond broke out offensively whilst still providing a physical two-way game in contributing with 18 goals and 34 points in 44 games. Approaching the final year of his contract he re-signed to a five-year contract extension with Genève-Servette on June 23, 2014.

Only two weeks after in signing his extension, Almond was granted a release from the Eagles, after earning a one-year, $550,000 contract to return with the Wild on July 8, 2014. Almond was unable to make the Wild's opening night roster for the 2014–15 season, and was assigned to AHL affiliate, the Iowa Wild. After just five games, going scoreless, and recovering from an injury, Almond opted to leave Minnesota and return to Switzerland on his initial five-year agreement made with Genève-Servette HC on December 1, 2014.

In June 2018, Almond opted out of his contract with Genève-Servette HC to sign a three-year deal worth CHF 1.6 million (+ bonuses and additional costs) with Lausanne HC for the 2019/20 season. Almond should have joined Lausanne in the summer of 2018, but both clubs failed to find an agreement, forcing Almond to stay in Geneva through the 2018/19 season.

During his tenure with Servette, Almond was largely criticized for his inconsistency and his lack of physical condition as he failed to play a single full season over 7 years in Geneva. He eventually played 213 regular season games with Geneva (139 points) and 35 playoffs games (20 points), before moving to Geneva's biggest rival, Lausanne HC.

On February 25, 2025, after not playing all season, Almond announced his retirement.

== Personal life ==
Almond received Swiss citizenship in 2012. His maternal grandmother Martha is a native of Olten, Switzerland.

== Career statistics ==
=== Regular season and playoffs ===
			Regular season					Playoffs
Season	Team	League	GP	G	A	Pts	PIM	GP	G	A	Pts	PIM
2005–06	Kelowna Rockets	WHL	23	2	1	3	7	8	0	0	0	0
2006–07	Kelowna Rockets	WHL	68	15	28	43	72	—	—	—	—	—
2007–08	Kelowna Rockets	WHL	69	22	34	56	114	7	1	2	3	2
2008–09	Kelowna Rockets	WHL	70	33	33	66	105	22	10	17	27	51
2009–10	Houston Aeros	AHL	48	7	11	18	77	—	—	—	—	—
2009–10	Minnesota Wild	NHL	7	1	0	1	9	—	—	—	—	—
2010–11	Houston Aeros	AHL	65	15	19	34	124	22	0	6	6	20
2010–11	Minnesota Wild	NHL	8	0	0	0	2	—	—	—	—	—
2011–12	Houston Aeros	AHL	46	7	8	15	91	4	1	1	2	6
2011–12	Minnesota Wild	NHL	10	1	0	1	15	—	—	—	—	—
2012–13	Genève-Servette HC	NLA	39	8	22	30	56	7	0	2	2	18
2013–14	Genève-Servette HC	NLA	44	18	16	34	75	12	0	5	5	6
2014–15	Iowa Wild	AHL	5	0	0	0	6	—	—	—	—	—
2014–15	Genève-Servette HC	NLA	20	5	6	11	24	12	3	6	9	16
2015–16	Genève-Servette HC	NLA	4	0	1	1	2	—	—	—	—	—
2016–17	Genève-Servette HC	NLA	38	11	13	24	42	4	1	3	4	14
2017–18	Genève-Servette HC	NL	28	6	4	10	100	—	—	—	—	—
2018–19	Genève-Servette HC	NL	40	12	17	29	30	—	—	—	—	—
2019–20	Lausanne HC	NL	41	9	12	21	46	—	—	—	—	—
2020–21	Lausanne HC	NL	42	7	7	14	84	6	1	0	1	16
2021–22	Lausanne HC	NL	32	7	6	13	63	—	—	—	—	—
2022–23	Lausanne HC	NL	42	3	3	6	55	—	—	—	—	—
2023–24	Lausanne HC	NL	40	1	6	7	51	14	2	1	3	33
NHL totals			25	2	0	2	26	—	—	—	—	—
NL totals			410	87	113	200	628	55	7	17	24	103

=== International ===
Year	Team	Event	Result	GP	G	A	Pts	PIM
2015	Switzerland	WC	8th	8	0	2	2	2
2017	Switzerland	WC	6th	7	2	2	4	2
2018	Switzerland	OG	10th	4	0	2	2	25
Senior totals				19	2	6	8	29
