= Ilkka Heikkinen =

Finnish ice hockey player (born 1984)

- Born: November 13, 1984 (age 41) Rauma, FIN
- Height: 6 ft 2 in (188 cm)
- Weight: 200 lb (91 kg; 14 st 4 lb)
- Position: Defence
- Shoots: Left
- SHL team Former teams: Växjö Lakers; Lukko Rauma; HIFK; New York Rangers; Sivir Novosibirsk; HC Lugano; Salavat Yulaev Ufa
- NHL draft: Undrafted
- Playing career: 2003–present

Ilkka Heikkinen (born November 13, 1984) is a Finnish professional ice hockey defenceman who is currently playing for Växjö Lakers Hockey of the Swedish Hockey League (SHL).

== Playing career ==
Heikkinen developed within his hometown club of Lukko before making his professional SM-liiga debut in the 2003–04 season. After 4 season's in the top league with Lukko Ilkka moved to rival HIFK for two years, scoring a career high 37 points in the 2007–08 season.

On May 20, 2009, Heikkinen agreed to a one-year contract with the New York Rangers of the NHL. After making his North American debut with American Hockey League affiliate, the Hartford Wolf Pack, He appeared in his first career NHL game, a 2-1 Rangers victory over the Buffalo Sabres on December 5, 2009. Heikkinen played in 7 games with the Rangers before returning to the Wolf Pack for the majority of the 2009–10 season.

On May 21, 2010, Ilkka returned to Europe, signing a one-year contract with HC Sibir Novosibirsk of the KHL.

On April 29, 2011, Ilkka signed a one-year contract with the Växjö Lakers Hockey of the Swedish Elitserien (SEL).

== Career statistics ==
			Regular season					Playoffs
Season	Team	League	GP	G	A	Pts	PIM	GP	G	A	Pts	PIM
2003–04	Lukko	SM-l	20	0	1	1	12	—	—	—	—	—
2004–05	Lukko	SM-l	48	0	2	2	8	9	0	0	0	0
2005–06	Lukko	SM-l	55	5	10	15	46	—	—	—	—	—
2006–07	Lukko	SM-l	55	7	17	24	71	3	0	0	0	0
2007–08	HIFK	SM-l	51	11	26	37	96	7	0	2	2	6
2008–09	HIFK	SM-l	54	8	26	34	22	2	0	1	1	0
2009–10	Hartford Wolf Pack	AHL	72	8	30	38	27	—	—	—	—	—
2009–10	New York Rangers	NHL	7	0	0	0	0	—	—	—	—	—
2010–11	HC Sibir Novosibirsk	KHL	49	7	15	22	19	4	0	0	0	4
2011–12	Växjö Lakers Hockey	SEL	55	18	15	33	34	—	—	—	—	—
2012–13	HC Lugano	NLA	44	14	13	27	32	7	2	0	2	8
2013–14	HC Lugano	NLA	41	7	17	24	34	2	0	0	0	0
2014–15	Salavat Yulaev Ufa	KHL	57	9	8	17	16	5	0	0	0	2
Liiga totals			283	31	82	113	255	21	0	3	3	6
NHL totals			7	0	0	0	0	—	—	—	—	—
KHL totals			106	16	23	39	35	9	0	0	0	6
SHL totals			55	18	15	33	34	—	—	—	—	—
