= Nicklas Danielsson =

Swedish ice hockey player

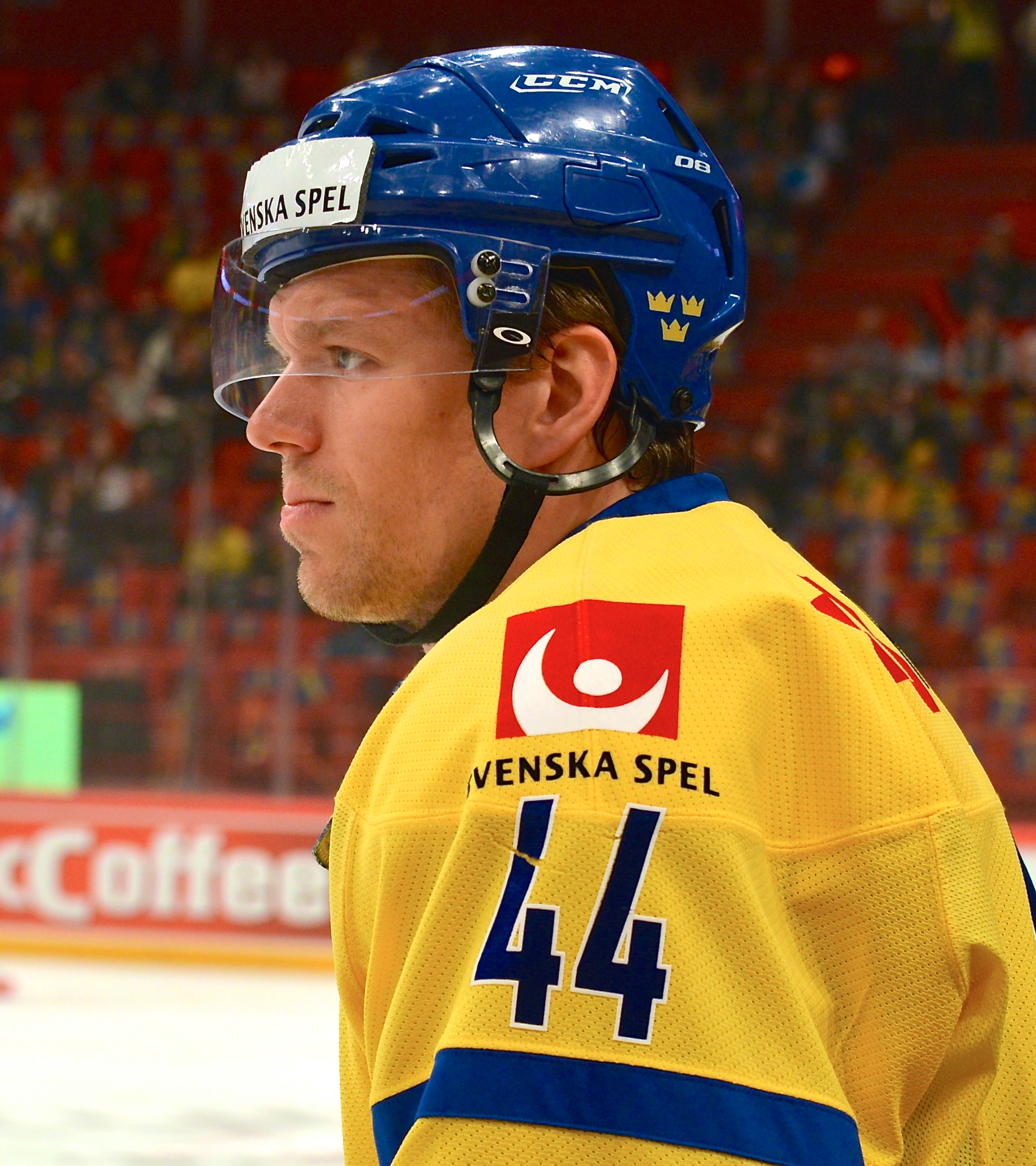
- Born: 7 December 1984 (age 41) Uppsala, Sweden
- Height: 6 ft 0 in (183 cm)
- Weight: 183 lb (83 kg; 13 st 1 lb)
- Position: Right wing
- Shot: Right
- Played for: Brynäs IF; Modo Hockey; SC Bern; HC Lev Praha; SC Rapperswil-Jona Lakers; Lausanne HC; Djurgårdens IF; Almtuna IS
- National team: Sweden
- NHL draft: 160th overall, 2003; Vancouver Canucks
- Playing career: 2003–2023

Nicklas Danielsson (born 7 December 1984) is a Swedish former professional ice hockey player. He last played with Almtuna IS in the HockeyAllsvenskan (Allsv). He previously played with Brynäs IF in the Swedish Hockey League (SHL) and was drafted by the Vancouver Canucks in the fifth round of the 2003 NHL entry draft, 160th overall.

After scoring 47 points in 46 games in his first full season in the NLA with the Rapperswil-Jona Lakers in 2014–15, Danielsson signed an optional two-year contract with fellow Swiss club, Lausanne HC on 23 April 2015.

== Career statistics ==
=== Regular season and playoffs ===
			Regular season					Playoffs
Season	Team	League	GP	G	A	Pts	PIM	GP	G	A	Pts	PIM
2000–01	Västerås IK	J18 Allsv	9	6	8	14	12	—	—	—	—	—
2000–01	Västerås IK	SWE.4	13	3	5	8	2	—	—	—	—	—
2001–02	Brynäs IF	J18 Allsv	3	1	0	1	4	—	—	—	—	—
2001–02	Brynäs IF	J20	36	14	11	25	64	3	0	3	3	6
2002–03	Brynäs IF	J20	21	21	12	33	24	2	1	0	1	2
2002–03	Brynäs IF	SEL	26	0	4	4	10	—	—	—	—	—
2003–04	Brynäs IF	J20	10	8	8	16	12	5	3	1	4	48
2003–04	Brynäs IF	SEL	47	6	0	6	22	—	—	—	—	—
2003–04	Almtuna IS	Allsv	4	1	1	2	6	—	—	—	—	—
2004–05	Brynäs IF	J20	9	12	2	14	55	—	—	—	—	—
2004–05	Brynäs IF	SEL	30	0	1	1	2	—	—	—	—	—
2004–05	Almtuna IS	Allsv	19	5	2	7	37	—	—	—	—	—
2005–06	Almtuna IS	Allsv	38	15	20	35	147	—	—	—	—	—
2006–07	Djurgårdens IF	SEL	50	6	5	11	30	—	—	—	—	—
2007–08	Djurgårdens IF	SEL	53	14	18	32	58	5	0	0	0	6
2008–09	Djurgårdens IF	SEL	50	7	14	21	69	—	—	—	—	—
2009–10	Djurgårdens IF	SEL	55	10	10	20	42	16	4	4	8	8
2010–11	Modo Hockey	SEL	54	17	20	37	77	—	—	—	—	—
2011–12	Modo Hockey	SEL	53	21	31	52	77	6	2	1	3	6
2012–13	SC Bern	NLA	23	4	4	8	10	—	—	—	—	—
2012–13	HC Lev Praha	KHL	16	6	8	14	16	4	1	1	2	14
2013–14	HC Lev Praha	KHL	14	1	1	2	6	—	—	—	—	—
2013–14	Rapperswil–Jona Lakers	NLA	33	10	7	17	73	—	—	—	—	—
2014–15	Rapperswil–Jona Lakers	NLA	46	19	28	47	50	—	—	—	—	—
2015–16	Lausanne HC	NLA	49	12	23	35	20	—	—	—	—	—
2016–17	Lausanne HC	NLA	42	8	23	31	38	3	1	0	1	2
2017–18	Lausanne HC	NL	49	25	25	50	64	—	—	—	—	—
2018–19	Brynäs IF	SHL	50	15	15	30	63	—	—	—	—	—
2019–20	Brynäs IF	SHL	51	10	25	35	40	—	—	—	—	—
2020–21	Brynäs IF	SHL	45	11	14	25	20	—	—	—	—	—
2021–22	Brynäs IF	SHL	51	6	11	17	16	3	0	1	1	0
SHL totals			615	123	168	291	526	30	6	6	12	20
NL totals			242	78	110	188	255	3	1	0	1	2

Medal record

Representing Sweden

World Championships
Bronze medal – third place	2014 Belarus	

=== International ===
Year	Team	Event	GP	G	A	Pts	PIM
2004	Sweden	WJC	6	2	1	3	8
2013	Sweden	WC	10	1	2	3	14
2014	Sweden	WC	10	2	2	4	2
2015	Sweden	WC	6	0	0	0	0
Senior totals			26	3	4	7	16
