= Simon Fischer =

Simon Fischer may refer to:

- Simon Fischer (ice hockey) (born 1988), American-born ice hockey player
- Simon Fischer (musician) (born 1956), Australian violinist
- Simon Fischer nut butters manufactured by Solo Foods
- Simon Fischer, fictional character introduced in Season 3 of the television series Covert Affairs

== See also ==
- Simon Fisher (disambiguation)
