= Christophe Bays =

Swiss professional ice hockey goaltender

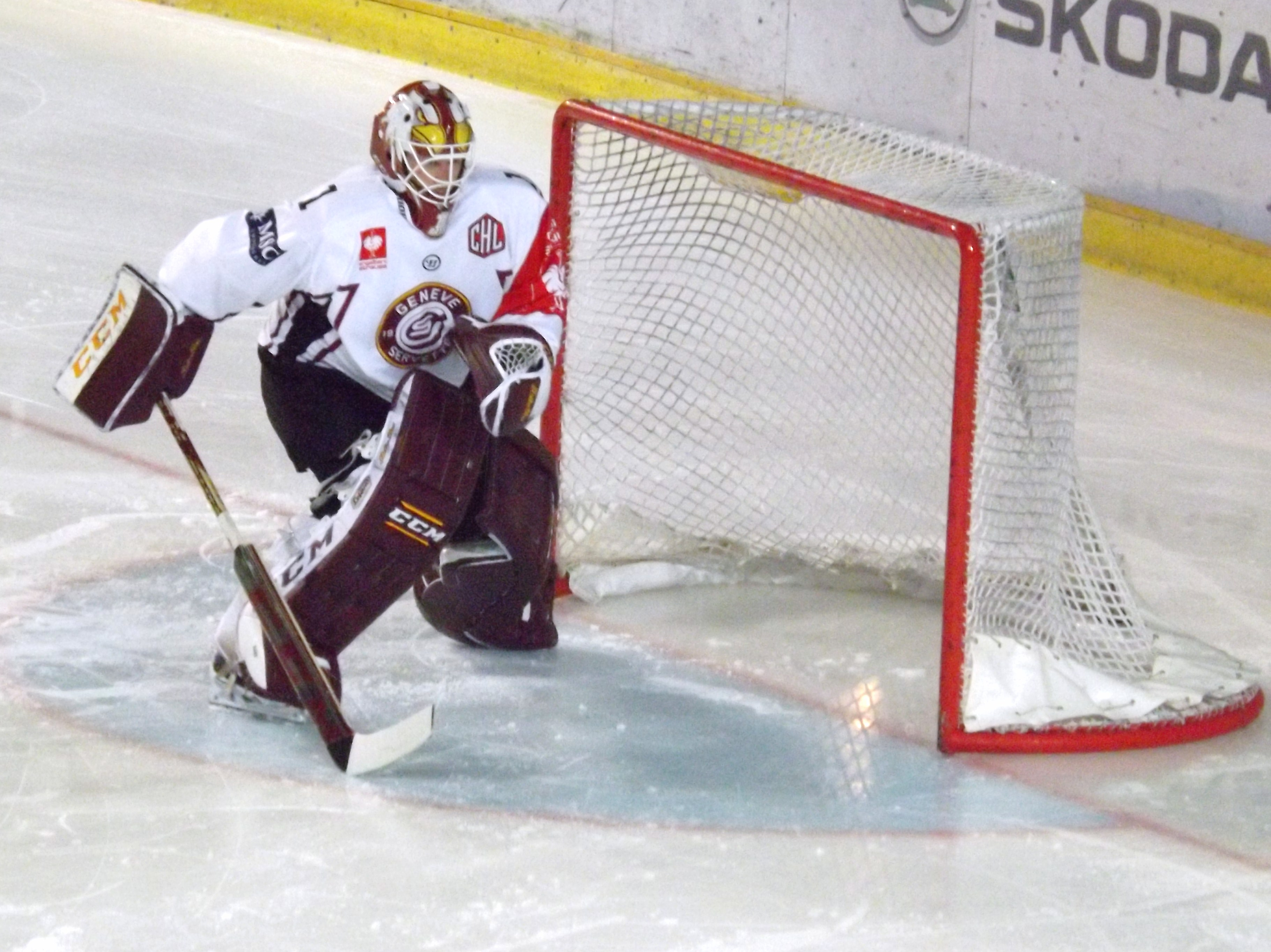
- Christophe Bays with Genève-Servette in 2014
- Born: March 28, 1991 (age 33); Switzerland
- Height: 6 ft 2 in (188 cm)
- Weight: 180 lb (82 kg; 12 st 12 lb)
- Position: Goaltender
- Catches: Left
- SL team Former teams: HC La Chaux-de-Fonds; Genève-Servette HC
- Playing career: 2011–present

Christophe Bays (born March 28, 1991) is a Swiss professional ice hockey goaltender. He is currently playing with HC La Chaux-de-Fonds of the Swiss League (SL).

Bays made his National League A debut playing with Lausanne HC during the 2013–14 NLA season.
