= Leonardo Genoni =

Swiss ice hockey player (born 1987)

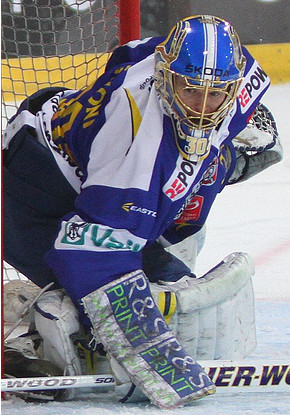
- Leonardo Genoni in 2012
- Born: 28 August 1987 (age 38) Semione, Switzerland
- Height: 5 ft 11 in (180 cm)
- Weight: 176 lb (80 kg; 12 st 8 lb)
- Position: Goaltender
- Catches: Left
- NL team Former teams: EV Zug; ZSC Lions; HC Davos; SC Bern
- National team: Switzerland
- Playing career: 2004–present

Leonardo Genoni (born 28 August 1987) is a Swiss professional ice hockey player who is a goaltender for EV Zug of the National League (NL).

== Playing career ==
Genoni made his professional debut with the GCK Lions in the Swiss League as a prospect to the ZSC Lions during the 2004–05 season. He went on to play 3 seasons in the organization before moving to HC Davos for the 2007–08 season. Genoni played 9 seasons for Davos becoming one of the best goaltenders in the National League.

On 1 October 2015 Genoni signed a three-year contract with SC Bern worth CHF 1.8 million for the 2016/17 season and through the 2018–19 season.

On 6 August 2018 Genoni signed a five-year contract worth CHF 5 million with EV Zug for the 2019–20 season and through the 2023–24 season.

== International play ==
Medal record

Representing Switzerland

Ice hockey

World Championships
Silver medal – second place	2018 Denmark	
Silver medal – second place	2024 Czech Republic	
Silver medal – second place	2025 Sweden/Denmark	
Silver medal – second place	2026 Switzerland	

As a junior player, Genoni competed at the 2005 IIHF World U18 Championships and at the IIHF World U20 Championship. He participated at multiple Ice Hockey World Championships (e.g. 2011 and 2018) as a member of the Switzerland men's national ice hockey team.

At the 2018 IIHF World Championship, he won a silver medal after advancing to the final but Switzerland fell to Sweden in the shootout. He represented Switzerland at the 2024 IIHF World Championship and won a silver medal.

He represented Switzerland at the 2025 IIHF World Championship where he won a silver medal and was named MVP of the tournament.

Between the 2024, 2025, and 2026 IIHF World Championship Gold Medal games, he allowed three goals on 99 shots, for a .970 save percentage.

== Career statistics ==
=== International ===
Year	Team	Event	Result	GP	W	L	OTL	MIN	GA	SO	GAA	SV%
2011	Switzerland	WC	9th	2	0	2	0	124	5	0	2.43	.947
2014	Switzerland	WC	10th	1	0	1	0	60	5	0	5.00	.839
2015	Switzerland	WC	8th	3	2	1	0	184	3	1	0.98	.955
2017	Switzerland	WC	6th	6	3	3	0	362	10	2	1.66	.933
2018	Switzerland	OG	10th	1	0	1	0	26	4	0	9.28	.667
2018	Switzerland	WC	2nd place, silver medalist(s)	7	4	3	0	446	19	0	2.56	.915
2019	Switzerland	WC	8th	4	2	2	0	242	8	0	1.99	.938
2021	Switzerland	WC	6th	4	1	2	0	220	8	1	2.18	.918
2022	Switzerland	OG	8th	3	1	1	0	160	3	0	1.13	.961
2022	Switzerland	WC	5th	4	3	1	0	234	9	1	2.30	.890
2023	Switzerland	WC	5th	3	3	0	0	180	2	2	0.67	.966
2024	Switzerland	WC	2nd place, silver medalist(s)	7	5	2	0	431	10	1	1.39	.941
2025	Switzerland	WC	2nd place, silver medalist(s)	7	5	0	2	424	7	4	0.99	.953
2026	Switzerland	OG	5th	4	3	1	0	245	6	2	1.47	.946
2026	Switzerland	WC	2nd place, silver medalist(s)	7	6	1	0	431	4	3	0.56	.971
Senior totals				48	29	17	2	2,906	86	12	1.78	.931

== Awards and honours ==
Award	Year
NL
Youngster of the Year	2008
Champion	2009, 2011, 2015, 2017, 2019, 2021, 2022
Jacques Plante Trophy	2011, 2015, 2017, 2019, 2021, 2022
All-Star Team	2011, 2017, 2018, 2019
MVP	2011
International
Spengler Cup Champion	2006, 2011
Spengler Cup All-Star team	2014
IIHF World Championship Silver Medal	2018, 2024, 2025, 2026
IIHF World Championship MVP	2025
IIHF World Championship Best Goaltender	2025
IIHF World Championship All-Star team	2025, 2026
