= Simon Fisher (disambiguation) =

Simon Fisher (born 1970) is a British scientist.

Simon Fisher may also refer to:

- Simon Fisher (priest), Anglican priest

== See also ==
- Simon Fisher Turner (born 1954), English musician
- Simon Fisher-Becker (1961–2025), English actor
- Simon Fischer (disambiguation)
