= Arnaud Jacquemet =

Swiss ice hockey player

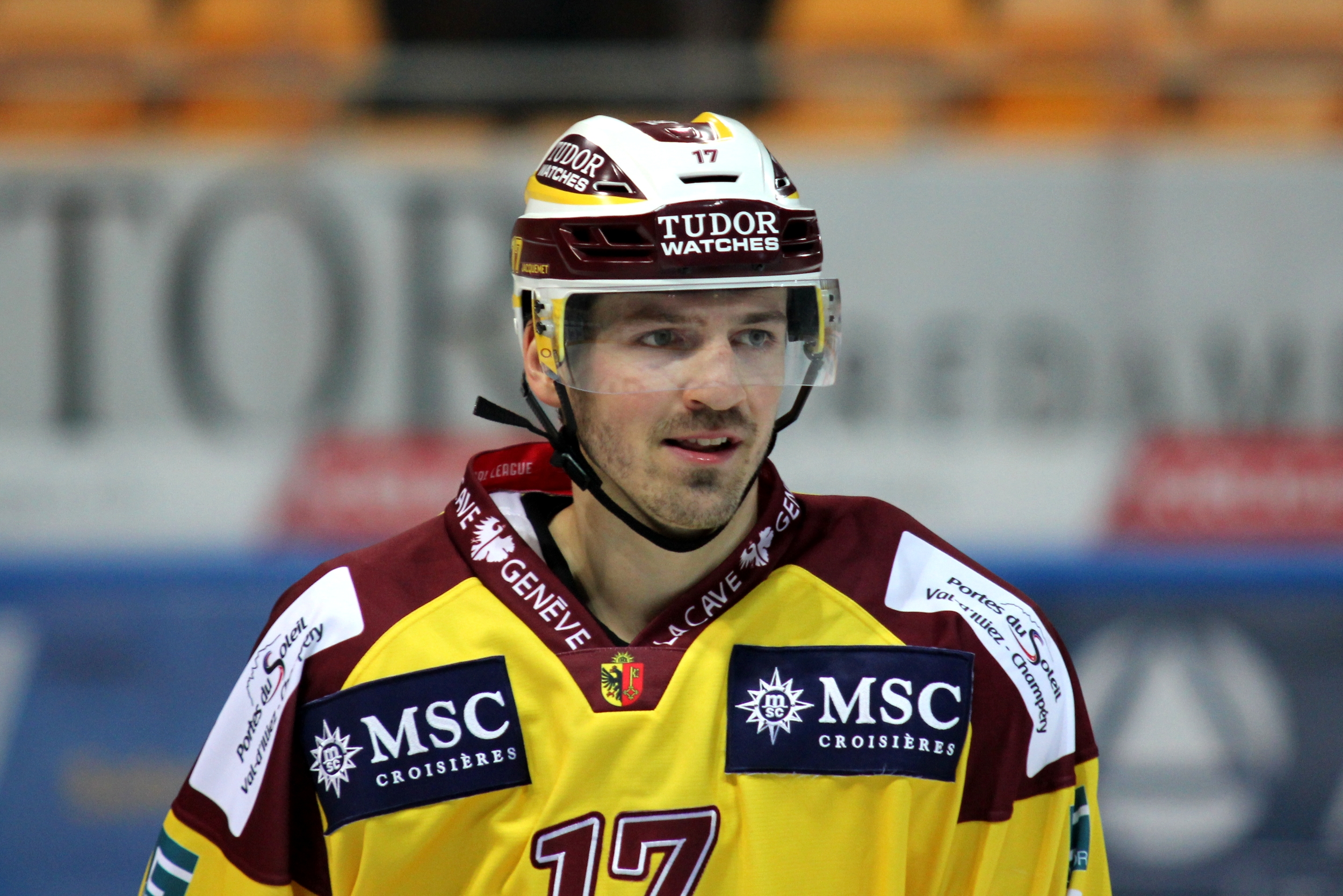
- Born: March 29, 1988 (age 37); Sion, Switzerland
- Height: 6 ft 1 in (185 cm)
- Weight: 198 lb (90 kg; 14 st 2 lb)
- Position: Defence
- Shot: Right
- Played for: EHC Kloten; SCL Tigers; Genève-Servette HC
- NHL draft: Undrafted
- Playing career: 2005–2025

Arnaud Jacquemet (born March 29, 1988) is a Swiss former professional ice hockey defenseman. He spent most of his career with Genève-Servette HC of the National League (NL). He also played for EHC Kloten and the SCL Tigers.

Jacquemet was one of the few players in the NL who could play both as a forward and as a defenseman.

Jacquemet made his National League A debut playing with Kloten Flyers during the 2008–09 NLA season.

Jacquemet retired from professional hockey following the 2024-25 season. He played 17 seasons in the National League, including 12 with Genève-Servette where he won one NL championship and one CHL title.
