= Marcus Paulsson =

Swedish ice hockey player

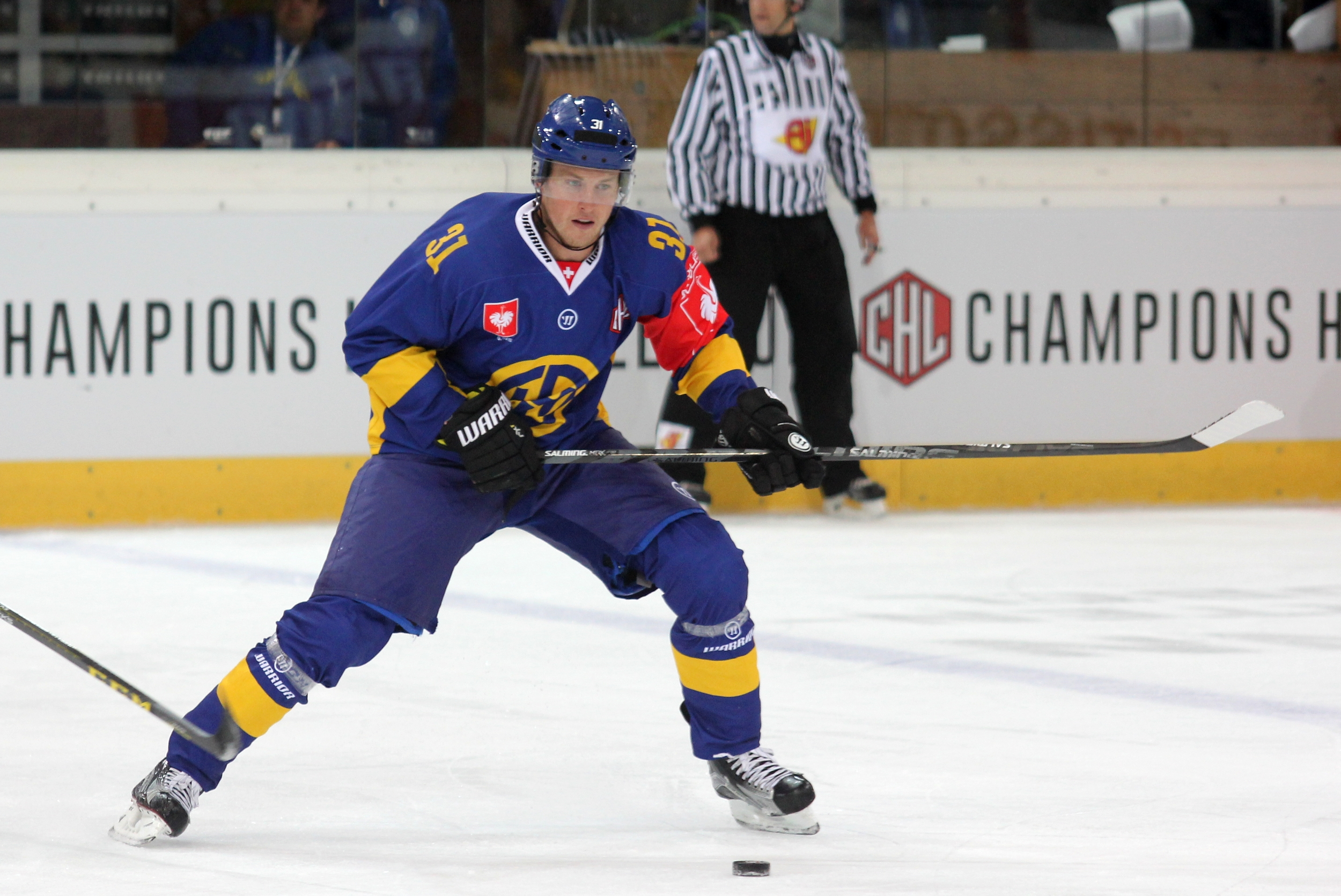
- Born: January 10, 1984 (age 42) Karlskrona, Sweden
- Height: 6 ft 2 in (188 cm)
- Weight: 198 lb (90 kg; 14 st 2 lb)
- Position: Winger
- Shoots: Left
- SHL team Former teams: Karlskrona HK; Malmö Redhawks; Lahti Pelicans; TPS; Färjestads BK; HC Davos
- NHL draft: 149th overall, 2002; New York Islanders
- Playing career: 2001–present

Marcus Paulsson (born January 10, 1984) is a Swedish professional ice hockey winger who currently plays for Karlskrona HK of the Swedish Hockey League (SHL).

He was selected by the New York Islanders in the 5th round (149 overall) of the 2002 NHL entry draft.

== Career ==
Paulsson is a product of Mörrums GoIS. From 2002 to 2004, he played for the Saskatoon Blades in the Western Hockey League.

While with the Malmö Redhawks, Paulsson led Sweden's second-tier league Allsvenskan in goal scoring with 30 in 2007-08. He captured the Swedish championship with Färjestad BK in 2009 and 2011.

Paulsson joined HC Davos of the Swiss top-flight National League A (NLA) in 2013. In his first season with the club, 2013–14, he scored 24 goals in 44 games. The following year, he chipped in with 14 goals, while winning the NLA championship with HCD. After having played three years in Davos, he left the club following the 2015-16 campaign and agreed to terms with Karlskrona HK of the Swedish Hockey League (SHL) in April 2016.

== Career statistics ==
=== Regular season and playoffs ===
| | | | Regular season | | | | | Playoffs |
| Season | Team | League | GP | G | A | Pts | PIM | GP | G | A | Pts | PIM |
|---|---|---|---|---|---|---|---|---|---|---|---|---|
| 2001–02 | Mörrums GoIS IK | SWE.2 U20 |
| 2001–02 | Mörrums GoIS IK | Allsv | 31 | 0 | 1 | 1 | 4 | 10 | 0 | 0 | 0 | 0 |
| 2002–03 | Saskatoon Blades | WHL | 56 | 13 | 18 | 31 | 20 | 6 | 1 | 3 | 4 | 2 |
| 2003–04 | Saskatoon Blades | WHL | 69 | 10 | 24 | 34 | 39 | — | — | — | — | — |
| 2004–05 | Malmö Redhawks | SEL | 42 | 1 | 0 | 1 | 10 | — | — | — | — | — |
| 2004–05 | Halmstad Hammers HC | Allsv | 2 | 0 | 0 | 0 | 2 | — | — | — | — | — |
| 2004–05 | Mörrums GoIS IK | Allsv | 9 | 4 | 1 | 5 | 18 | — | — | — | — | — |
| 2005–06 | Pelicans | SM-liiga | 42 | 13 | 5 | 18 | 86 | — | — | — | — | — |
| 2005–06 | TPS | SM-liiga | 13 | 3 | 2 | 5 | 4 | 2 | 1 | 1 | 2 | 4 |
| 2006–07 | Malmö Redhawks | SEL | 50 | 9 | 3 | 12 | 51 | — | — | — | — | — |
| 2007–08 | Malmö Redhawks | Allsv | 45 | 30 | 23 | 53 | 28 | 10 | 3 | 3 | 6 | 8 |
| 2008–09 | Malmö Redhawks | Allsv | 36 | 13 | 14 | 27 | 86 | — | — | — | — | — |
| 2008–09 | Färjestad BK | SEL | 8 | 3 | 1 | 4 | 6 | 13 | 2 | 2 | 4 | 4 |
| 2009–10 | Färjestad BK | SEL | 53 | 16 | 13 | 29 | 20 | 7 | 1 | 1 | 2 | 4 |
| 2010–11 | Färjestad BK | SEL | 43 | 11 | 9 | 20 | 14 | 14 | 2 | 4 | 6 | 2 |
| 2011–12 | Färjestad BK | SEL | 52 | 10 | 6 | 16 | 43 | 11 | 1 | 4 | 5 | 6 |
| 2012–13 | Färjestad BK | SEL | 55 | 19 | 18 | 37 | 16 | 8 | 0 | 3 | 3 | 0 |
| 2013–14 | HC Davos | NLA | 44 | 24 | 11 | 35 | 10 | 6 | 3 | 1 | 4 | 4 |
| 2014–15 | HC Davos | NLA | 41 | 14 | 21 | 35 | 20 | 15 | 6 | 4 | 10 | 2 |
| 2015–16 | HC Davos | NLA | 21 | 10 | 7 | 17 | 45 | 6 | 1 | 2 | 3 | 2 |
| 2016–17 | Karlskrona HK | SHL | 37 | 11 | 7 | 18 | 10 | — | — | — | — | — |
| 2017–18 | Karlskrona HK | SHL | 42 | 8 | 7 | 15 | 10 | — | — | — | — | — |
| 2018–19 | Karlskrona HK | Allsv | 50 | 18 | 18 | 36 | 14 | 5 | 2 | 0 | 2 | 0 |
| 2019–20 | Mörrums GoIS IK | SWE.3 | 28 | 22 | 18 | 40 | 40 | — | — | — | — | — |
| 2019–20 | Växjö Lakers | SHL | 17 | 2 | 3 | 5 | 10 | — | — | — | — | — |
| 2020–21 | Mörrums GoIS IK | SWE.3 | 39 | 24 | 17 | 41 | 6 | 2 | 0 | 1 | 1 | 0 |
| 2020–21 | Tingsryds AIF | Allsv | 2 | 1 | 5 | 6 | 0 | — | — | — | — | — |
| 2021–22 | Mörrums GoIS IK | SWE.3 | 34 | 24 | 13 | 37 | 8 | — | — | — | — | — |
| Allsv totals | | | 133 | 62 | 60 | 122 | 128 | 15 | 5 | 3 | 8 | 8 |
| SHL totals | | | 399 | 90 | 67 | 157 | 190 | 53 | 6 | 14 | 20 | 16 |
| NLA totals | | | 106 | 48 | 39 | 87 | 75 | 27 | 10 | 7 | 17 | 8 |

=== International ===
| Year | Team | Event | GP | G | A | Pts | PIM |
|---|---|---|---|---|---|---|---|
| 2003 | Sweden | WJC | 6 | 0 | 3 | 3 | 6 |
| Junior totals | | | 6 | 0 | 3 | 3 | 6 |
