= Alexander Mereskin =

Russian ice hockey player

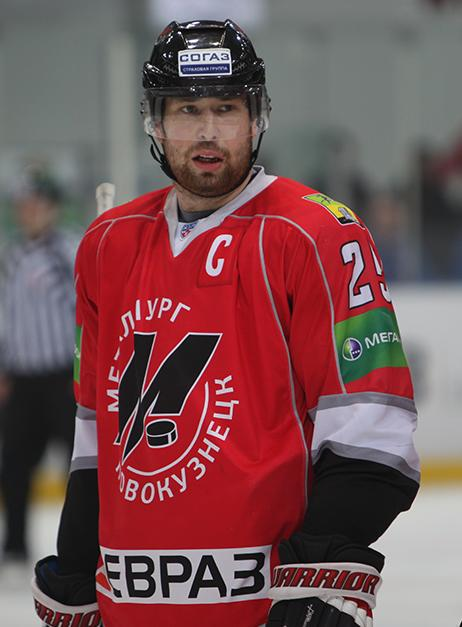
- Born: December 3, 1987 (age 38) Moscow, Russia
- Height: 6 ft 3 in (191 cm)
- Weight: 205 lb (93 kg; 14 st 9 lb)
- Position: Centre
- Shoots: Left
- VHL team Former teams: Torpedo Ust-Kamenogorsk; HC Lada Togliatti; Metallurg Novokuznetsk; Salavat Yulaev Ufa; HC Spartak Moscow; HC Sochi; Severstal Cherepovets; Admiral Vladivostok
- Playing career: 2006–present

Alexander Mereskin (born December 3, 1987) is a Russian professional ice hockey centre currently playing with Torpedo Ust-Kamenogorsk of the Supreme Hockey League (VHL).

== Playing career ==
A veteran of 12 professional seasons, Mereskin opted to join HC Sochi on a two-year deal as a free agent on May 3, 2016.

After spending the 2017–18 season with Severstal Cherepovets, Mereskin continued his journeyman career in joining Admiral Vladivostok on a one-year contract on July 12, 2018.
