= Alexei Glukhov =

Russian ice hockey player

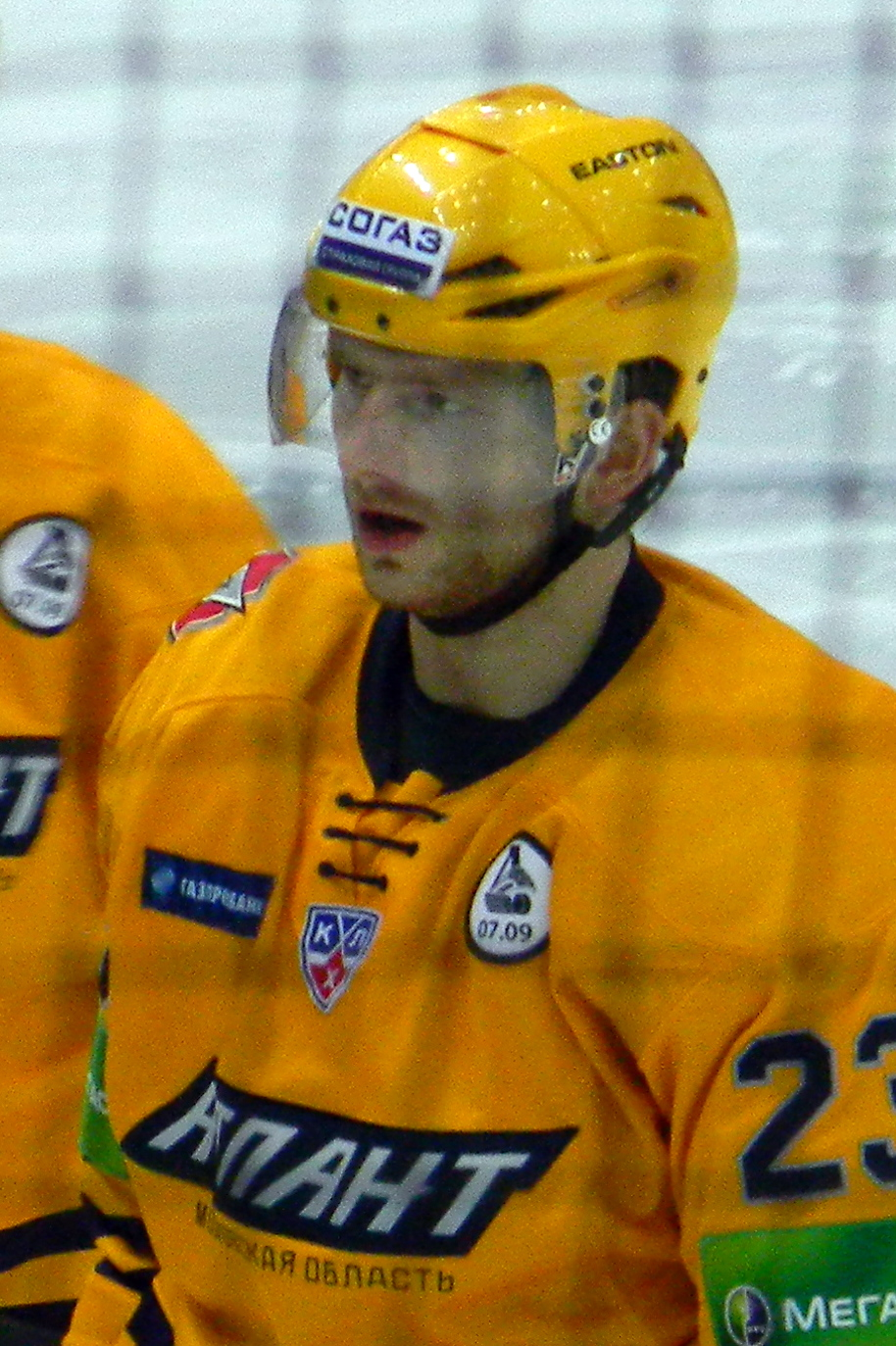
- Born: April 5, 1984 (age 42) Voskresensk, Russia
- Height: 6 ft 4 in (193 cm)
- Weight: 225 lb (102 kg; 16 st 1 lb)
- Position: Forward
- Shot: Left
- Played for: Khimik Voskresensk; Springfield Falcons; Severstal Cherepovets; Atlant Moscow Oblast; Salavat Yulaev Ufa; Avangard Omsk; Sibir Novosibirsk
- NHL draft: 286th overall, 2002; Tampa Bay Lightning
- Playing career: 2003–2017

Alexei Vladimirovich Glukhov (Russian: Алексей Владимирович Глухов; born April 5, 1984 in Voskresensk) is a Russian former professional ice hockey forward who last played under contract with HC Sibir Novosibirsk of the Kontinental Hockey League (KHL). He was selected by Tampa Bay Lightning in the 9th round (286th overall) of the 2002 NHL entry draft.

== Career statistics ==
			Regular season					Playoffs
Season	Team	League	GP	G	A	Pts	PIM	GP	G	A	Pts	PIM
1999–2000	Khimik–2 Voskresensk	RUS.3	10	2	2	4	2	—	—	—	—	—
2000–01	Khimik–2 Voskresensk	RUS.3	11	4	3	7	20	—	—	—	—	—
2000–01	Khimik Voskresensk	RUS.2	—	—	—	—	—	9	0	1	1	6
2001–02	Khimik Voskresensk	RUS.2	3	0	0	0	0	3	0	0	0	0
2001–02	Khimik–2 Voskresensk	RUS.3	36	9	23	32	64	—	—	—	—	—
2002–03	Khimik Voskresensk	RUS.2	38	4	4	8	30	13	1	5	6	4
2002–03	Khimik–2 Voskresensk	RUS.3	15	7	4	11	10	—	—	—	—	—
2003–04	Khimik Voskresensk	RSL	28	0	0	0	12	—	—	—	—	—
2003–04	Khimik–2 Voskresensk	RUS.3	9	7	1	8	6	—	—	—	—	—
2004–05	Khimik Voskresensk	RSL	9	0	0	0	6	—	—	—	—	—
2004–05	Kristall Elektrostal	RUS.2	16	2	2	4	20	—	—	—	—	—
2004–05	Springfield Falcons	AHL	3	0	1	1	6	—	—	—	—	—
2004–05	Victoria Salmon Kings	ECHL	32	5	12	17	12	—	—	—	—	—
2005–06	Khimik Moscow Oblast	RSL	45	2	14	16	70	9	2	1	3	10
2006–07	Severstal Cherepovets	RSL	52	2	14	16	97	5	0	0	0	4
2007–08	Severstal Cherepovets	RSL	57	7	13	20	86	8	2	0	2	12
2008–09	Atlant Moscow Oblast	KHL	43	10	10	20	28	7	1	1	2	4
2009–10	Atlant Moscow Oblast	KHL	51	5	12	17	34	4	0	1	1	0
2010–11	Atlant Moscow Oblast	KHL	54	5	12	17	34	24	2	5	7	12
2011–12	Atlant Moscow Oblast	KHL	50	6	14	20	24	10	0	0	0	6
2012–13	Salavat Yulaev Ufa	KHL	48	5	6	11	22	14	0	3	3	12
2013–14	Salavat Yulaev Ufa	KHL	40	3	6	9	35	5	0	0	0	2
2014–15	Salavat Yulaev Ufa	KHL	58	4	12	16	24	5	0	1	1	2
2015–16	Avangard Omsk	KHL	38	2	4	6	24	9	0	1	1	4
2016–17	Avangard Omsk	KHL	15	2	1	3	6	—	—	—	—	—
2016–17	Sibir Novosibirsk	KHL	31	4	4	8	43	—	—	—	—	—
RSL totals			191	11	41	52	271	22	4	1	5	26
KHL totals			428	46	81	127	274	78	3	12	15	42
