= Simon Fischer (ice hockey) =

American-born Swiss ice hockey player

- Born: June 21, 1988 (age 36); New Rochelle, New York, U.S.
- Height: 6 ft 1 in (185 cm)
- Weight: 187 lb (85 kg; 13 st 5 lb)
- Position: Left wing
- Shoots: Left
- SL team Former teams: HC La Chaux-de-Fonds; EV Zug; EHC Olten; EHC Chur; EHC Biel; SC Langenthal; Lausanne HC; EHC Visp; HC Red Ice
- NHL draft: Undrafted
- Playing career: 2006–present

Simon Fischer (born June 21, 1988) is an American-born Swiss professional ice hockey player who is currently playing with HC La Chaux-de-Fonds of the Swiss League (SL). He previously played in the National League (NL) for EV Zug, EHC Biel and Lausanne HC.

Fischer made his National League (NL) debut playing with EV Zug during the 2005-06 season.
