= 2018–19 National League (ice hockey) season =

2018–19 National League season
- League: National League
- Sport: Ice hockey
- Duration: September 21, 2018 – March 4, 2019
- Games: 50
- Teams: 12

Regular season
- Best record: SC Bern
- Runners-up: EV Zug
- Season MVP: Dominik Kubalík (HC Ambrì-Piotta)
- Top scorer: Dominik Kubalík (HC Ambrì-Piotta)

Playoffs
- Semi-Final champions: SC Bern
- Semi-Final runners-up: EHC Biel
- Semi-Final champions: EV Zug
- Semi-Final runners-up: Lausanne HC

Swiss champion NL
- Champions: SC Bern
- Runners-up: EV Zug

National League seasons
- ← 2017–18 2019–20 →

The 2018–19 National League season was the 81st season of Swiss professional ice hockey and the second season as the National League (NL).

ZSC Lions were the defending Swiss national champions, however missed the playoffs altogether.

SC Bern won the regular season for a third consecutive year, and went on to defeat regular season runners-up EV Zug in the playoff finals 4–1 to claim their 16th Swiss championship, and third in four years.

The qualification series between SC Rapperswil-Jona Lakers and SC Langenthal was not played, due to SC Langenthal's home arena not meeting NL requirements, therefore SC Rapperswil-Jona Lakers would remain in the NL for the 2019–20 season.

== Teams ==
NL teams for the 2018–19 season

Team	City	Arena	Capacity
HC Ambrì-Piotta	Ambrì	Valascia	6,500
SC Bern	Bern	PostFinance-Arena	17,031
EHC Biel	Biel/Bienne	Tissot Arena	6,521
HC Davos	Davos	Vaillant Arena	6,800
Fribourg-Gottéron	Fribourg	BCF Arena	6,500
Genève-Servette HC	Geneva	Patinoire des Vernets	7,135
Lausanne HC	Lausanne	Temporary Arena	6,700
HC Lugano	Lugano	Pista La Resega	7,800
SCL Tigers	Langnau im Emmental	Ilfis Stadium	6,000
SC Rapperswil-Jona Lakers	Rapperswil	Diners Club Arena	6,200
ZSC Lions	Zürich	Hallenstadion	11,200
EV Zug	Zug	Bossard Arena	7,200

== Regular season ==
Pos	Team	Pld	W	OTW	OTL	L	GF	GA	GD	Pts	Qualification
1	SC Bern	50	31	3	2	14	143	99	+44	101	Advance to Playoffs
2	EV Zug	50	30	1	5	14	159	115	+44	97	Advance to Playoffs
3	Lausanne HC	50	25	2	3	20	141	126	+15	82	Advance to Playoffs
4	EHC Biel	50	24	2	3	21	149	138	+11	79	Advance to Playoffs
5	HC Ambrì-Piotta	50	21	6	4	19	138	140	−2	79	Advance to Playoffs
6	SCL Tigers	50	22	4	4	20	132	126	+6	78	Advance to Playoffs
7	HC Lugano	50	24	2	2	22	160	141	+19	78	Advance to Playoffs
8	Genève-Servette HC	50	21	4	4	21	137	150	−13	75	Advance to Playoffs
9	ZSC Lions	50	19	6	5	20	129	132	−3	74	Advance to Playouts (Note: Relegation Playoffs)
10	Fribourg-Gottéron	50	22	3	2	23	125	125	0	74	Advance to Playouts
11	HC Davos	50	14	4	1	31	121	167	−46	51	Advance to Playouts
12	SC Rapperswil-Jona Lakers	50	9	1	3	37	92	167	−75	32	Advance to Playouts

Source: NLA
Rules for classification: 1) points; 2) higher number of points earned in games between the tied teams; 3) goal difference; 4) number of goals scored; 5) goal difference in games between the tied teams; 6) number of goals scored in games between the tied teams; 7) higher number of away goals scored; 8) higher number of away goals scored in games between the tied teams; 9) NL committee decision. Rules

== Player statistics ==
=== Scoring leaders ===
The following players led the league in points, at the conclusion of the regular season. If two or more skaters are tied (i.e. same number of points, goals and played games), all of the tied skaters are shown.

Player	Team	GP	G	A	Pts	+/–	PIM
Dominik Kubalík	HC Ambrì-Piotta	50	25	32	57	+5	18
Mark Arcobello	SC Bern	49	21	32	53	+20	79
Grégory Hofmann	HC Lugano	50	30	21	51	+15	24
Toni Rajala	EHC Biel	50	27	21	48	+8	36
Dustin Jeffrey	Lausanne HC	44	15	31	46	+9	10
Chris DiDomenico	SCL Tigers	48	10	36	46	+5	134
Lino Martschini	EV Zug	50	22	22	44	+14	6
Harri Pesonen	SCL Tigers	50	21	22	43	+1	40
Dominic Zwerger	HC Ambrì-Piotta	49	17	25	42	-6	30
Raffaele Sannitz	HC Lugano	48	11	29	40	+11	64

=== Leading goaltenders ===
The following goaltenders led the league in goals against average, provided that they have played at least 40% of their team's minutes, at the conclusion of the regular season.

Player	Team	GP	TOI	W	WO	LO	L	GA	SO	Sv%	GAA
Leonardo Genoni	SC Bern	43	2499	27	1	1	12	77	10	.933	1.85
Reto Berra	Fribourg-Gottéron	45	2632	19	2	1	21	97	3	.920	2.21
Tobias Stephan	EV Zug	36	2050	18	0	3	11	76	5	.925	2.22
Sandro Zurkirchen	Lausanne HC	36	2166	18	1	1	13	82	2	.927	2.27
Niklas Schlegel	ZSC Lions	26	1413	8	2	2	8	56	3	.914	2.38

== Playoffs ==
Quarter-Finals
1	SC Bern	4
8	Genève-Servette HC	2
4	EHC Biel	4
5	HC Ambrì-Piotta	1
(Pairings are reseeded after the first round)
2	EV Zug	4
7	HC Lugano	0
3	Lausanne HC	4
6	SCL Tigers	3

Semi-Finals
1	SC Bern	4
4	EHC Biel	3
2	EV Zug	4
3	Lausanne HC	1

Finals
1	SC Bern	4
2	EV Zug	1

== Relegation playoffs – Playouts ==
=== Ranking round ===
Pos	Team	Pld	W	OTW	OTL	L	GF	GA	GD	Pts
1	Fribourg-Gottéron	56	26	3	3	24	146	138	+8	87
2	ZSC Lions	56	21	7	5	23	141	152	−11	82
3	HC Davos	56	15	4	1	36	135	185	−50	54
4	SC Rapperswil-Jona Lakers	56	13	1	3	39	108	179	−71	44

Source: NLA
Rules for classification: 1) points; 2) higher number of points earned in games between the tied teams; 3) goal difference; 4) number of goals scored; 5) goal difference in games between the tied teams; 6) number of goals scored in games between the tied teams; 7) higher number of away goals scored; 8) higher number of away goals scored in games between the tied teams; 9) NL committee decision. Rules

=== Playout final ===
HC Davos 4–1 SC Rapperswil-Jona Lakers (3–2, 5–3, 2–3, 5–3, 3–1)

=== League Qualification ===
2018–19 Swiss League champions SC Langenthal's home arena Schoren Halle did not comply with the National League's requirements, and if promoted they would therefore have had to play their home games at an alternative arena. Initially SC Langenthal announced that they would still play the league qualification despite not intending to gain promotion. However on April 5, SC Langenthal announced that they would not be contesting the League Qualification, meaning SC Rapperswil-Jona Lakers would remain in the National League for the 2019–20 season.
