= 2012–13 NLA season =

2012–13 National League A season
- League: National League A
- Sport: Ice hockey
- Duration: September 12, 2012 – February 26, 2013
- Number of games: 50
- Number of teams: 12

Regular Season
- Best Record: Fribourg-Gottéron
- Runners-up: SC Bern
- Top scorer: Linus Omark (EV Zug)

Playoffs
- Semi-final #1 champions: Fribourg-Gottéron
- Semi-final #1 runners-up: ZSC Lions
- Semi-final #2 champions: SC Bern
- Semi-final #2 runners-up: EV Zug

National League A Championship
- Champions: SC Bern
- Runners-up: Fribourg-Gottéron

NLA seasons
- ← 2011–12 2013–14 →

The 2012–13 National League A season is the sixth ice hockey season of Switzerland's top hockey league, the National League A. Overall, it is the 75th season of Swiss professional hockey.

== Regular season ==
Final Standings

	Team	GP	Pts	W	L	OTW	OTL	SHW	SHL
1.	Fribourg-Gottéron	50	99	24	10	4	1	7	4
2.	SC Bern	50	92	27	15	1	1	2	4
3.	EV Zug	50	91	26	14	0	3	3	4
4.	ZSC Lions	50	89	24	16	5	1	2	2
5.	HC Davos	50	81	22	17	1	3	3	4
6.	HC Lugano	50	80	21	17	3	5	2	2
7.	Genève-Servette HC	50	80	23	20	3	2	1	1
8.	EHC Biel	50	72	19	21	3	1	5	4
9.	Kloten Flyers	50	69	16	21	3	2	5	4
10.	HC Ambrì-Piotta	50	53	14	29	0	1	4	2
11.	Rapperswil-Jona Lakers	50	53	13	27	2	4	2	2
12.	SCL Tigers	50	41	10	32	1	0	2	5

GP = Games Played, W = Wins, L = Loss, OTW = Overtime win, OTL = Overtime loss, SHW = Shootout win, SHL = Shootout loss
Color code: = Qualified for Playoffs, = Qualified for Relegation Playoffs

== Playoffs ==
Quarter-Finals
1	Fribourg-Gottéron	4
8	EHC Biel	3
2	SC Bern	4
7	Genève-Servette HC	3
(Pairings are reseeded after the first round)
3	EV Zug	4
6	HC Lugano	3
4	ZSC Lions	4
5	HC Davos	3

Semi-Finals
1	Fribourg-Gottéron	4
4	ZSC Lions	1
2	SC Bern	4
3	EV Zug	3

Finals
1	Fribourg-Gottéron	2
2	SC Bern	4

== Relegation Playoffs ==
The bottom 4 teams of the National League A will compete in a losing team advances tournament to determine if they should stay in the League. The loser of this tournament will compete against the champions of the National League B to determine which league they will play in next season.

Semi-Finals
9	Kloten Flyers	4
12	SCL Tigers	1
10	HC Ambrì-Piotta	4
11	Rapperswil-Jona Lakers	1

Finals
11	Rapperswil-Jona Lakers	4
12	SCL Tigers	3

== Playdowns ==
The SCL Tigers were defeated by Lausanne HC, champions of the National League B, in the promotion/relegation games with a series of 4-2. The 12th team of the National League A for the season 2013/2014 will be Lausanne HC.
