= 2013–14 NLA season =

2013–14 National League A season
- League: National League A
- Sport: Ice hockey
- Duration: September 12, 2013 – March 3, 2014
- Number of games: 50
- Number of teams: 12

Regular Season
- Best Record: ZSC Lions
- Runners-up: Fribourg-Gottéron

Playoffs
- Semi-final #1 champions: ZSC Lions
- Semi-final #1 runners-up: Genève-Servette HC
- Semi-final #2 champions: Kloten Flyers
- Semi-final #2 runners-up: Fribourg-Gottéron

National League A Championship
- Champions: ZSC Lions
- Runners-up: Kloten Flyers

NLA seasons
- ← 2012–13 2014–15 →

The 2013–14 National League A season is the seventh ice hockey season of Switzerland's top hockey league, the National League A. Overall, it is the 76th season of Swiss professional hockey. It was won by ZSC Lions after beating Kloten Flyers 4-0 in the playoff final.

== Regular season ==
=== Teams ===
After the 2012–13 season, SCL Tigers were defeated by Lausanne HC of National League B, switching places with them. The number of teams stands at 12.

NLA teams for the 2013–14 season

Team	City	Arena	Capacity
HC Ambrì-Piotta	Ambrì	Valascia	7,000
SC Bern	Bern	PostFinance-Arena	17,131
EHC Biel	Biel/Bienne	Eisstadion Biel	7,000
HC Davos	Davos	Vaillant Arena	7,280
HC Fribourg-Gottéron	Fribourg	BCF Arena	6,800
Genève-Servette HC	Geneva	Patinoire des Vernets	7,382
Kloten Flyers	Kloten	Kolping Arena	7,719
Lausanne HC	Lausanne	CIG de Malley	9,244
HC Lugano	Lugano	Pista La Resega	8,250
Rapperswil-Jona Lakers	Rapperswil	Diners Club Arena	6,200
EV Zug	Zug	Bossard Arena	7,015
ZSC Lions	Zurich	Hallenstadion	11,200

== Regular season ==
Rank	Team	GP	W	L	OTW	OTL	SOW	SOL	Goals	Diff.	Pts
1	ZSC Lions	50	32	9	1	2	0	6	167:111	56	106
2	Fribourg-Gottéron	50	25	18	2	0	2	3	151:147	4	86
3	Kloten Flyers	50	22	18	4	1	5	0	147:121	26	85
4	Genève-Servette HC	50	21	16	2	5	5	1	158:133	25	83
5	HC Lugano	50	23	18	2	3	3	1	142:114	28	83
6	HC Davos	50	22	20	1	1	5	1	151:133	18	80
7	HC Ambrì-Piotta	50	22	20	1	1	3	3	126:123	3	78
8	Lausanne HC	50	20	20	2	3	2	3	104:115	-11	74
9	SC Bern	50	19	22	3	3	1	2	126:129	-3	70
10	EV Zug	50	15	20	5	2	1	7	132:156	-24	66
11	EHC Biel	50	11	29	1	1	6	2	115:154	-39	50
12	Rapperswil-Jona Lakers	50	9	31	1	3	1	5	117:200	-83	39

== Playoffs ==
Quarterfinals
1	ZSC Lions	4
8	Lausanne HC	3
4	Genève-Servette HC	4
5	HC Lugano	1
2	Fribourg-Gottéron	4
7	HC Ambrì-Piotta	0
3	Kloten Flyers	4
6	HC Davos	2

Semifinals
1	ZSC Lions	4
4	Genève-Servette HC	3
2	Fribourg-Gottéron	2
3	Kloten Flyers	4

Final
1	ZSC Lions	4
3	Kloten Flyers	0

== Relegation round ==
Six games were played as part of the relegation round. Results from the regular season carried over.

Rank	Team	GP	W	L	OTW	OTL	SOW	SOL	Goals	Diff.	Pts
1	SC Bern	56	22	25	3	3	1	2	147:148	–1	79
2	EV Zug	56	19	22	5	2	1	7	152:175	–23	78
3	EHC Biel	56	13	33	1	1	6	2	130:168	–38	56
4	Rapperswil-Jona Lakers	56	12	34	1	3	1	5	136:223	–87	48

=== Final ===
The bottom two teams played in the final.

- EHC Biel - Rapperswil-Jona Lakers 2:4 (3:2 OT, 1:3, 2:3, 4:3 OT, 1:4, 4:5)

== Playouts ==
The bottom team from the relegation round, EHC Biel, played against HC Viège, the National League B champion, for the right to play in the 2014-15 NLA season.

- EHC Biel - EHC Visp 4:1 (5:2, 2:5, 5:1, 4:1, 3:2)
