= 2011 Spengler Cup =

2011 Spengler Cup Davos, Switzerland
Tournament details
- Host country: Switzerland
- Venue(s): Vaillant Arena, Davos
- Dates: 26–31 December 2011
- Teams: 6

Final positions
- Champions: (Switzerland) HC Davos (15th title)
- Runner-up: (Latvia) Dinamo Riga

Tournament statistics
- Games played: 11
- Goals scored: 67 (6.09 per game)
- Attendance: 69,401 (6,309 per game)
- Scoring leader(s): (Latvia) Roberts Bukarts (6 pts)

The 2011 Spengler Cup was held in Davos, Switzerland from 26 to 3 December 2011. All matches were played at host HC Davos's home Vaillant Arena. The number of teams was expanded in 2010 from 5 to 6 in comparison to previous seasons, and split into two groups of three. The two groups, named Torriani and Cattini, were named after legendary Swiss hockey players Bibi Torriani and Hans Cattini. HC Davos won the event for a record 15th time.

== Teams participating ==
The list of teams that have been confirmed for the tournament are as listed:

- (Switzerland) HC Davos (host)
- Team Canada
- (Latvia) Dinamo Riga
- (Germany) EHC Wolfsburg Grizzly Adams
- (Czech Republic) HC Vítkovice Steel
- (Switzerland) Kloten Flyers

The division of the teams into the two groups and the subsequent schedule were determined on 2 September 2011.

== Match Officials ==
Here is the list of match officials that have been confirmed for the tournament:

Referees	Linesmen
(Switzerland) Danny Kurmann	(Switzerland) Roger Arm
(Canada) Jean Hébert	(Switzerland) Roman Kaderli
(Germany) Georg Jablukov	(Switzerland) Andreas Kohler
(Switzerland) Didier Massy	(Switzerland) Peter Küng
(Switzerland) Daniel Stricker	(Switzerland) Joris Müller

== Group stage ==
=== Key ===
- W (regulation win) – 3 pts.
- OTW (overtime/shootout win) – 2 pts.
- OTL (overtime/shootout loss) – 1 pt.
- L (regulation loss) – 0 pts.

=== Group Torriani ===
Team	Pld	W	OTW	OTL	L	GF	GA	GD	Pts	Qualification
(Latvia) Dinamo Riga	2	2	0	0	0	12	3	+9	6	Clinched group
(Switzerland) Kloten Flyers	2	1	0	0	1	8	9	−1	3	Quarterfinal berth
(Germany) EHC Wolfsburg	2	0	0	0	2	1	9	−8	0	Quarterfinal berth

All times are local (UTC+1).

26 December 2011; 15:00	Kloten Flyers (Switzerland)	2–9 (0–0, 1–3, 1–6)	(Latvia) Dinamo Riga	Vaillant Arena; Attendance: 6,500

Game reference

Ronnie Rüeger
Goalies
Chris Holt
Referees:
(Switzerland) Daniel Stricker
(Canada) Jean Hébert

	0–1	21' – M. Karsums (N. Lucenius, G. Galviņš)
V. Stancescu (R. Wick) – 22'	1–1
	1–2	25' – M. Cipulis (J. Rēdlihs)
	1–3	29' – R. Bukarts (G. Meija)
	1–4	42' – S. Ozoliņš (M. Karsums) (PP)
	1–5	44' – Ģ. Ankipāns (G. Meija, R. Bukarts)
	1–6	46' – M. Cipulis (F. Warg)
	1–7	47' – J. Upitis (J. Štāls, G. Galviņš)
	1–8	49' – O. Cibuļskis
	1–9	55' – Ģ. Ankipāns (G. Meija, R. Bukarts) (PP)
E. Blum (M. DuPont) – 58'	2–9

8 min
Penalties
4 min

27 December 2011; 15:00	EHC Wolfsburg (Germany)	0–6 (0–1, 0–2, 0–3)	(Switzerland) Kloten Flyers	Vaillant Arena; Attendance: 6,010

Game reference

Daniar Dshunussow
Goalies
Michael Flückiger
Referees:
(Canada) Jean Hébert
(Germany) Georg Jablukov

0–1	14' – R. Wick (M. Nylander)
0–2	35' – M. DuPont (T. Santala) (PP)
0–3	36' – Y. Herren (A. Jacquemet, M. Liniger)
0–4	45' – M. Jenni (N. Nordgren, M. DuPont) (PP)
0–5	54' – V. Stancescu (D. Westcott, R. Wick)
0–6	57' – R. Wick (S. Berger)

30 min
Penalties
14 min

28 December 2011; 15:00	Dinamo Riga (Latvia)	3–1 (2–0, 0–0, 1–1)	(Germany) EHC Wolfsburg	Vaillant Arena; Attendance: 6,147

Game reference

Māris Jučers
Goalies
Lukas Lang
Referees:
(Switzerland) Danny Kurmann
(Switzerland) Daniel Stricker

F. Warg (J. Lundmark, O. Cibuļskis) – 11'	1–0
Ģ. Ankipāns (R. Bukarts) – 14'	2–0
(SH) R. Bukarts (G. Meija) – 46'	3–0
	3–1	54' – N. Paetsch (C. Fischer) (PP)

10 min
Penalties
4 min

=== Group Cattini ===
Team	Pld	W	OTW	OTL	L	GF	GA	GD	Pts	Qualification
(Switzerland) HC Davos	2	2	0	0	0	10	2	+8	6	Clinched group
Team Canada	2	1	0	0	1	8	9	−1	3	Quarterfinal berth
(Czech Republic) HC Vítkovice Steel	2	0	0	0	2	2	9	−7	0	Quarterfinal berth

All times are local (UTC+1).

26 December 2011; 20:15	Team Canada	7–1 (5–0, 1–0, 1–1)	(Czech Republic) HC Vítkovice Steel	Vaillant Arena; Attendance: 6,500

Game reference

Marty Turco
Goalies
Martin Falter
Referees:
(Germany) Georg Jablukov
(Switzerland) Danny Kurmann

J. Kwiatkowski (P. Pelletier, D. Walser) – 3'	1–0
D. Pittis (S. Roest, S. Heins) – 4'	2–0
J. Perrault (J. Hendry) – 8'	3–0
(PP) B. McLean (S. Heins) – 11'	4–0
R. Fata (R. Parent) – 17'	5–0
(PP) J. Kwiatkowski – 38'	6–0
	6–1	49' – N. Walker (P. Pohl)
(PP) B. McLean (J. Williams, D. Pittis) – 53'	7–1

8 min
Penalties
12 min
41
Shots
31

27 December 2011; 20:15	HC Davos (Switzerland)	2–1 (0–0, 2–1, 0–0)	(Czech Republic) HC Vítkovice Steel	Vaillant Arena; Attendance: 6,500

Game reference

Leonardo Genoni
Goalies
Roman Málek
Referees:
(Switzerland) Didier Massy
(Switzerland) Daniel Stricker

	0–1	26' – P. Pohl (N. Walker)
P. Tatíček (R. von Arx) – 39'	1–1
P. Tatíček (R. von Arx, P. Brendl) – 40'	2–1

8 min
Penalties
10 min

28 December 2011; 20:15	Team Canada	1–8 (0–1, 1–1, 0–6)	(Switzerland) HC Davos	Vaillant Arena; Attendance: 6,500

Game reference

Jake Allen
Goalies
Reto Berra
Referees:
(Switzerland) Didier Massy
(Canada) Jean Hébert

	0–1	18' – P. Sýkora (SH)
	0–2	34' – P. Sýkora (B. Forster)
P. Pelletier (J. Perrault) – 40'	1–2
	1–3	43' – P. Sejna (R. Earl) (PP)
	1–4	47' – R. Earl (P. Brendl, B. Forster)
	1–5	51' – P. Sýkora (P. Tatíček, R. von Arx)
	1–6	53' – P. Sejna (R. Earl) (PP)
	1–7	57' – D. Bürgler (J. Steinmann, J. Niinimaa)
	1–8	58' – P. Brendl (R. Earl)

4 min
Penalties
10 min

== Knockout stage ==
Quarterfinals
A2	(Switzerland) Kloten Flyers	1
B3	(Czech Republic) HC Vítkovice Steel	5
B2	Team Canada	2
A3	(Germany) EHC Wolfsburg	3**

Semifinals
B1	(Switzerland) HC Davos	4
QF1	(Czech Republic) HC Vítkovice Steel	2
A1	(Latvia) Dinamo Riga	4
QF2	(Germany) EHC Wolfsburg	1

Final
SF1	(Switzerland) HC Davos	3
SF2	(Latvia) Dinamo Riga	2

Key: * – final in overtime. ** – final in shootout.

=== Quarterfinals ===
All times are local (UTC+1).

29 December 2011; 15:00	Kloten Flyers (Switzerland)	1–5 (0–1, 0–2, 1–2)	(Czech Republic) HC Vítkovice Steel	Vaillant Arena; Attendance: 5,677

http://www.spenglercup.ch/eishockey/spengler-cup/kloten-flyers/hc-vitkovice/2011-12-29.html?l=en

Ronnie Rüeger
Goalies
Roman Málek
Referees:
(Germany) Georg Jablukov
(Switzerland) Didier Massy

	0–1	17' – J. Káňa (O. Sedivy)
	0–2	22' – T. Káňa (J. Sykora, G. Randegger)
	0–3	39' – J. Sykora (F. Collenberg)
	0–4	41' – P. Pohl (PP)
	0–5	57' – J. Štefanka (PP)
F. Du Bois (E. Blum) – 59'	1–5

8 min
Penalties
8 min

29 December 2011; 20:15	Team Canada	2–3 (SO) (1–1, 1–0, 0–1, 0–0, 0–1)	(Germany) EHC Wolfsburg	Vaillant Arena; Attendance: 6,067

Game reference

Marty Turco
Goalies
Daniar Dshunussow
Referees:
(Canada) Jean Hébert
(Switzerland) Danny Kurmann

D. Pittis – 14'	1–0
	1–1	19' – J. Laliberte (N. Milley)
(PP) K. McLean (S. Heins, C. Murphy) – 38'	2–1
	2–2	52' – C. Fischer (PP)

J. Perrault
S. Roest (miss)
J. P. Vigier (miss)
J. Perrault (miss)
Shootout
(miss) M. Bishai
K. Hospelt
(miss) T. Haskins
K. Hospelt

=== Semifinals ===
All times are local (UTC+1).

30 December 2011; 15:00	HC Davos (Switzerland)	4–2 (1–1, 2–1, 1–0)	(Czech Republic) HC Vítkovice Steel	Vaillant Arena; Attendance: 6,500

Game reference

Leonardo Genoni
Goalies
Roman Málek
Referees:
(Switzerland) Daniel Stricker
(Germany) Georg Jablukov

G. Sciaroni (R. Earl, P. Sejna) – 4'	1–0
	1–1	12' – O. Sedivy (F. Collenberg)
	1–2	24' – N. Walker (L. Kucsera)
P. Tatíček (M. Joggi, R. von Arx) – 25'	2–2
P. Brendl (P. Guggisberg, J. Niinimaa) – 30'	3–2
(EN) P. Sýkora (P. Tatíček) – 60'	4–2

30 December 2011; 20:15	Dinamo Riga (Latvia)	4–1 (1–1, 2–0, 1–0)	(Germany) EHC Wolfsburg	Vaillant Arena; Attendance: 6,500

Game reference

Chris Holt
Goalies
Daniar Dshunussow
Referees:
(Switzerland) Danny Kurmann
(Switzerland) Didier Massy

	0–1	12' – B. Kohl (A. Huebscher)
M. Bičevskis (A. Podziņš) – 15'	1–1
(PP) M. Karsums (N. Lucenius, G. Galviņš) – 27'	2–1
(SH) M. Karsums (N. Lucenius) – 29'	3–1
(EN) J. Lundmark – 60'	4–1

=== Final ===
All times are local (UTC+1).

31 December 2011; 12:00	HC Davos (Switzerland)	3–2 (2–0, 1–1, 0–1)	(Latvia) Dinamo Riga	Vaillant Arena; Attendance: 6,500

Game reference

Reto Berra
Goalies
Māris Jučers
Referees:
(Canada) Jean Hébert
(Germany) Georg Jablukov

G. Sciaroni (S. Rizzi, P. Sejna) – 2'	1–0
(PP) P. Sýkora (B. Forster, R. von Arx – 11'	2–0
	2–1	22' – J. Lundmark (M. Cipulis)
P. Brendl (R. Grossmann) – 31'	3–1
	3–2	60' – N. Lucenius

== Champions ==
2011 Spengler Cup Winners
(Switzerland)
HC Davos
Fifteenth title

== All-Star Team ==
Position	Player	Nationality	Team
Goaltender	Roman Málek	(Czech Republic) Czech	(Czech Republic) HC Vítkovice Steel
Right Defender	Beat Forster	(Switzerland) Swiss	(Switzerland) HC Davos
Left Defender	Sandis Ozoliņš	(Latvia) Latvian	(Latvia) Dinamo Riga
Right Wing	Petr Sýkora	(Czech Republic) Czech	(Switzerland) HC Davos
Center	Kai Hospelt	(Germany) German	(Germany) EHC Wolfsburg
Left Wing	Robbie Earl	(United States) American	(Switzerland) HC Davos

== Statistics ==
=== Scoring leaders ===
Player	Team	GP	G	A	Pts
(Latvia) Roberts Bukarts	Dinamo Riga	3	2	4	6
(Czech Republic) Petr Sýkora	HC Davos	3	5	0	5
(Czech Republic) Petr Tatíček	HC Davos	3	3	2	5
(United States) Robbie Earl	HC Davos	3	1	4	5
(Czech Republic) Pavel Brendl	HC Davos	3	3	1	4
(Latvia) Mārtiņš Karsums	Dinamo Riga	3	3	1	4

GP = Games Played G = Goals; A = Assists; Pts = Points

Source: Spenglercup.ch

18:57, 31 December 2011 (UTC)

== Television ==
Several television channels around the world will cover many or all matches of the Spengler Cup. As well as most Swiss channels, here is a listing of who else will cover the tournament:

- Schweizer Fernsehen (Switzerland, host broadcaster)
- The Sports Network (Canada)
- LTV7 (Latvia)
- Eurosport 2, British Eurosport, Eurosport Asia and Pacific, and Eurosport HD
- Nova Sport (Czech Republic, Slovakia)
