= Malek =

Malek may refer to:

- Malek (given name), masculine Arabic given name
- Malek (surname)
- Malek, Iran (disambiguation), places in Iran
- Malek (horse), a Chilean-bred racehorse
- Malek (Legacy of Kain), a character in the Legacy of Kain series
- Málek, Czech surname
- Małek, Polish surname

== See also ==
- Malik, a Semitic word meaning "king"
- Enrique Malek International Airport, serving David, a city in the Chiriquí Province of Panama.
