= Deh Malek =

Deh Malek or Deh-e Malek or Dehmalek (Persian: ده ملك), also rendered as Deh Malik, may refer to:

- Deh-e Malek, Fars
- Deh-e Malek, Kerman
- Deh Malek, Rabor, Kerman Province

== See also ==
- Malek, Iran (disambiguation)
