= Malek, Iran =

Malek (Persian: ملك) may refer to:

- Malek, Kaleybar, East Azerbaijan Province
- Malek, Varzaqan, East Azerbaijan Province
- Malek, Kerman

== See also ==
- Deh-e Malek (disambiguation)
- Malek (disambiguation)
- Malik
