= Málek =

Málek (feminine Málková) is a Czech surname, derived from the word malý (small). Notable people include:

- Andrej Málek (born 1995), Slovak canoeist
- Daniel Málek (born 1973), Czech swimmer
- Fred Malek (1936–2019), American business executive, political advisor, fraudster, and philanthropist
- Jan Malek (born 2007), Polish chess grandmaster
- Jaromír Málek (1943–2023), Czech Egyptologist
- Marie Málková (born 1941), Czech actress
- Petr Málek (1961–2019), Czech sport shooter
- Roman Málek (born 1977), Czech ice hockey player
- Zdeňka Málková (born 1975), Czech tennis player
- Lexi Málková (born 2005), random Czech person

== See also ==
- Málek, Czech surname
- Malek (surname), Arabic
- Malek (given name), Arabic given name
- Małek, Polish surname
