= Małek =

Małek (Polish pronunciation: [ˈmawɛk]) is a Polish surname, derived from the word mały (small). Notable people include:

- Jan Michał Małek (1928–2022), Polish-American engineer, entrepreneur, real estate investor and developer, economics enthusiast, and activist and philanthropist
- Jan Malek (born 2007), Polish chess grandmaster
- Janusz Małek (born 1958), Polish footballer
- Luke Malek, American attorney and politician
- Marzena Małek (born 1976), Polish civil servant and manager, who served as Minister of State Assets
- Mirosław Małek (born 1975), Polish windsurfer
- Paweł Małek (1933–2019), Polish sports shooter
- Robert Małek (born 1971), Polish football referee
- Tatjana Maria (née Małek; born 1987), Polish–German tennis player

== See also ==
- Malek (surname), Arabic
- Malek (given name), Arabic given name
