= Janne Niinimaa =

Finnish ice hockey player (born 1975)

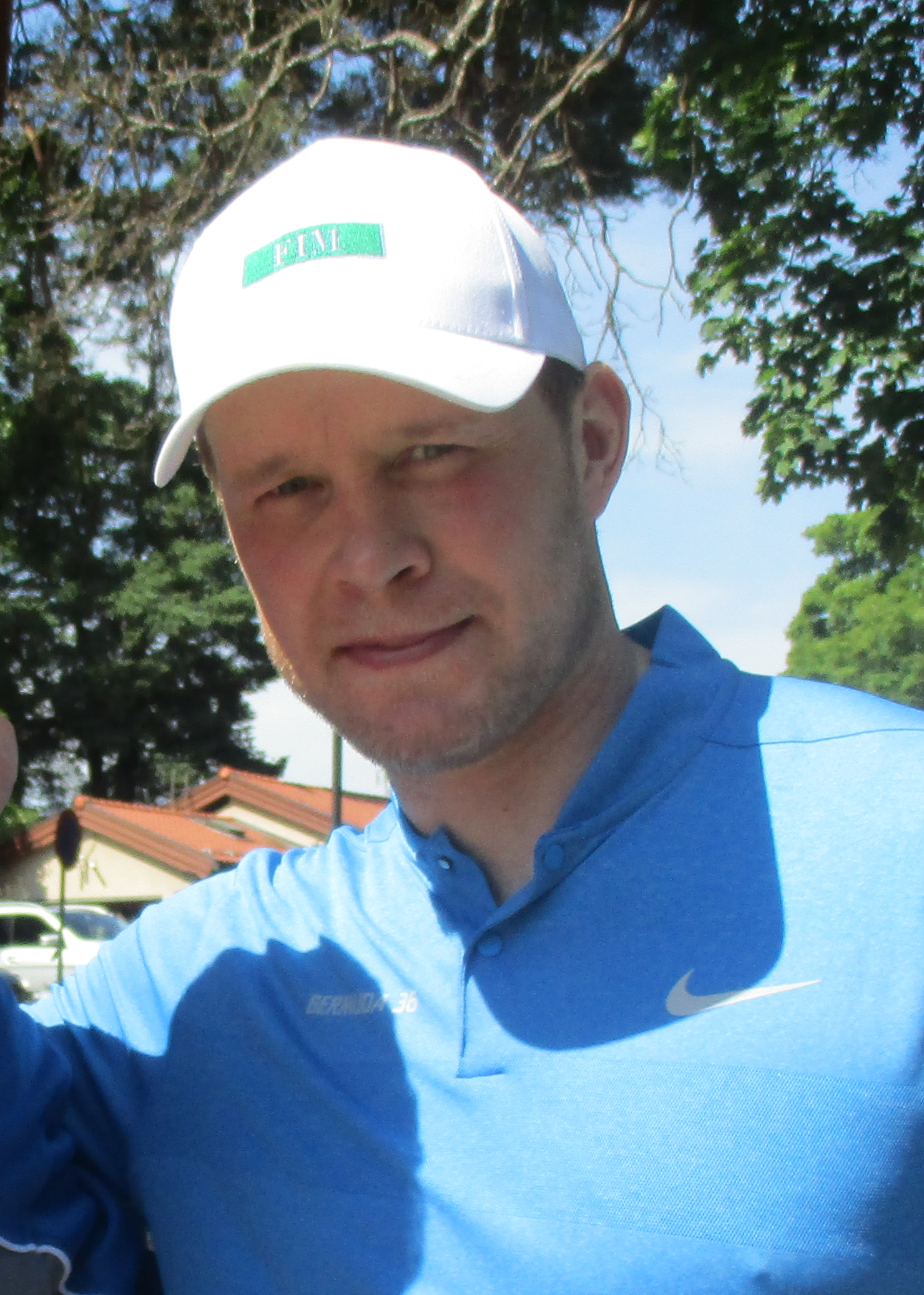
- Niinimaa in 2016
- Born: 22 May 1975 (age 51) Raahe, Finland
- Height: 6 ft 1 in (185 cm)
- Weight: 220 lb (100 kg; 15 st 10 lb)
- Position: Defence
- Shot: Left
- Played for: Jokerit; Philadelphia Flyers; Edmonton Oilers; New York Islanders; Malmö Redhawks; Kärpät; Dallas Stars; Montreal Canadiens; HC Davos; SCL Tigers; HV71; Luleå HF; Rapperswil-Jona Lakers
- National team: Finland
- NHL draft: 36th overall, 1993; Philadelphia Flyers
- Playing career: 1993–2013

Medal record

Men's ice hockey

Representing Finland

Olympic Games
Bronze medal – third place	1998 Nagano	Ice hockey

World Cup
Silver medal – second place	2004 Toronto	Ice hockey

World Championships
Gold medal – first place	1995 Sweden	Ice hockey
Bronze medal – third place	2000 Russia	Ice hockey

Janne Henrik Niinimaa (born May 22, 1975) is a Finnish former professional ice hockey player. He played 10 seasons in the National Hockey League (NHL) for the Philadelphia Flyers, Edmonton Oilers, New York Islanders, Dallas Stars, and Montreal Canadiens. He also played in the Finnish SM-liiga, Swedish Elitserien, and Swiss National League A.

== Playing career ==
Niinimaa was selected in the second round of the 1993 NHL entry draft, 36th overall, by the Philadelphia Flyers.

Following three seasons playing with Jokerit in Helsinki, Finland, Niinimaa made his debut with the Flyers in the 1996–97 NHL season, posting 44 points and a +12 rating, and being named to the NHL All-Rookie Team.

In the following 1998 season, Niinimaa was traded to the Edmonton Oilers, where he spent parts of six seasons. He earned himself an All-Star appearance in the 2000–01 NHL regular season. He was traded to the New York Islanders in 2003 and then was traded to the Dallas Stars and Montreal Canadiens. During the NHL lockout, Niinimaa returned to play in his native Finland. Niinimaa has twice represented Finland at the Winter Olympics, winning a bronze medal in 1998, and was on the national team when Finland won its first World Championship gold medal.

Despite these accolades, Ninimaa is perhaps best remembered for Darren McCarty's deke around him resulting in a goal in Game 4 of the 1997 Stanley Cup Finals, in which McCarty's Detroit Red Wings swept Niinimaa's Flyers.

Niinimaa retired on 10 February 2014.

== Personal life ==
On 2 August 2008, Niinimaa married Jaana Kehusmaa, a model from Oulu, at Kiiminki Church. Teemu Selänne, Saku Koivu, and Timo Jutila were among the invitees. They separated in July 2012.

== Transactions ==
- 26 June 1993 – Drafted by the Philadelphia Flyers
- 24 March 1998 – Traded by Philadelphia to the Edmonton Oilers in exchange for Dan McGillis and a 2nd round draft pick (Philadelphia selected Jason Beckett)
- 11 March 2003 – Traded by the Edmonton Oilers to the New York Islanders along with a second round draft pick (New York selected Evgeni Tunik) in exchange for Brad Isbister and Raffi Torres
- 10 January 2006 – Traded by the New York Islanders to the Dallas Stars along with a fifth round draft pick in exchange for John Erskine and a second round draft pick.
- 30 September 2006 – Traded by the Dallas Stars along with a fifth round pick in 2007 to the Montreal Canadiens in exchange for Mike Ribeiro and a 2008 sixth round pick.
- 14 September 2007 – Signed by HC Davos of the Swiss National League.
- 14 August 2008 – Signed by Kärpät of the SM-liiga.
- 27 November 2008 – Signed by SCL Tigers of the Swiss National League.
- 16 August 2009 – Signed by HV71 of Elitserien.

== Honours and accolades ==
- Elected to the Finnish Ice Hockey Hall of Fame in 2015 as a player.
- has played once NHL All-Star Game in 2001.
- Won the Swedish Champion (Le Mat Trophy) in 2009–10
- Won the Finnish Champion (Kanada-malja) in 1993–94, 1995–96 and 2004–05.
- Won the Spengler Cup in 2011.

== Career statistics ==
=== Regular season and playoffs ===
			Regular season					Playoffs
Season	Team	League	GP	G	A	Pts	PIM	GP	G	A	Pts	PIM
1991–92	Kärpät	FIN U20	3	0	0	0	4	—	—	—	—	—
1991–92	Kärpät	FIN.2	41	2	11	13	49	4	0	0	0	0
1992–93	Kärpät	FIN U20	10	3	9	12	16	—	—	—	—	—
1992–93	Kärpät	FIN.2	29	2	3	5	14	—	—	—	—	—
1992–93	KKP	FIN.3	1	0	2	2	2	—	—	—	—	—
1993–94	Jokerit	FIN U20	10	2	6	8	41	—	—	—	—	—
1993–94	Jokerit	SM-l	45	3	8	11	24	12	1	1	2	4
1994–95	Jokerit	FIN U20	3	1	2	3	8	—	—	—	—	—
1994–95	Jokerit	SM-l	42	7	10	17	36	10	1	4	5	35
1995–96	Jokerit	FIN U20	—	—	—	—	—	2	3	4	7	6
1995–96	Jokerit	SM-l	49	5	15	20	79	11	0	2	2	12
1996–97	Philadelphia Flyers	NHL	77	4	40	44	58	19	1	12	13	16
1997–98	Philadelphia Flyers	NHL	66	3	31	34	56	—	—	—	—	—
1997–98	Edmonton Oilers	NHL	11	1	8	9	6	11	1	1	2	12
1998–99	Edmonton Oilers	NHL	81	4	24	28	88	4	0	0	0	2
1999–2000	Edmonton Oilers	NHL	81	8	25	33	89	5	0	2	2	2
2000–01	Edmonton Oilers	NHL	82	12	34	46	90	6	0	2	2	6
2001–02	Edmonton Oilers	NHL	81	5	39	44	80	—	—	—	—	—
2002–03	Edmonton Oilers	NHL	63	4	24	28	66	—	—	—	—	—
2002–03	New York Islanders	NHL	13	1	5	6	14	5	0	1	1	12
2003–04	New York Islanders	NHL	82	9	19	28	64	5	1	2	3	2
2004–05	Malmö Redhawks	SEL	10	0	3	3	34	—	—	—	—	—
2004–05	Kärpät	SM-l	26	3	10	13	30	12	0	5	5	8
2005–06	New York Islanders	NHL	41	1	9	10	62	—	—	—	—	—
2005–06	Dallas Stars	NHL	22	2	4	6	24	4	0	1	1	8
2006–07	Montreal Canadiens	NHL	41	0	3	3	36	—	—	—	—	—
2007–08	HC Davos	NLA	48	9	28	37	127	—	—	—	—	—
2008–09	SC Langnau	NLA	20	8	10	18	20	—	—	—	—	—
2009–10	HV71	SEL	43	4	13	17	24	—	—	—	—	—
2010–11	Luleå HF	SEL	48	9	21	30	44	11	1	5	6	12
2011–12	Rapperswil–Jona Lakers	NLA	20	0	3	3	26	—	—	—	—	—
2012–13	Asplöven HC	SWE.2	7	1	3	4	10	—	—	—	—	—
SM-l totals			162	18	43	61	169	45	2	12	14	59
NHL totals			741	54	265	319	733	59	3	21	24	60
SEL totals			101	13	41	54	102	27	1	8	9	20

=== International ===
Year	Team	Event	GP	G	A	Pts	PIM
1992	Finland	EJC	6	4	3	7	8
1992	Finland	WJC	5	0	0	0	2
1993	Finland	EJC	6	1	1	2	20
1994	Finland	WJC	7	0	0	0	10
1995	Finland	WC	8	1	2	3	10
1995	Finland	WJC	7	2	3	5	6
1996	Finland	WC	5	1	0	1	10
1996	Finland	WCH	2	0	0	0	2
1998	Finland	OG	6	0	3	3	8
2000	Finland	WC	9	2	1	3	8
2002	Finland	OG	4	0	3	3	2
2002	Finland	WC	9	0	4	4	8
2003	Finland	WC	7	1	2	3	12
2004	Finland	WCH	3	0	0	0	0
2004	Finland	WC	7	0	5	5	2
2009	Finland	WC	6	0	1	1	16
Junior totals			31	7	7	14	46
Senior totals			66	5	21	26	78
