= 2005–06 Nationalliga A season =

2005–06 Nationalliga A Season
- League: Nationalliga A
- Sport: Ice hockey
- Duration: September 9, 2005 to April 17, 2006
- Games: 44
- Teams: 12

Regular Season
- Best Record: SC Bern
- Runners-up: HC Lugano
- Top scorer: Glen Metropolit (HC Lugano)

Playoffs
- Semi-Final #1 champions: HC Lugano
- Semi-Final #1 runners-up: Kloten Flyers
- Semi-Final #2 champions: HC Davos
- Semi-Final #2 runners-up: Rapperswil-Jona Lakers

Nationalliga A Championship
- Champions: HC Lugano
- Runners-up: HC Davos

NLA seasons
- ← 2004–05 2006–07 →

The 2005–06 Nationalliga A season was the 68th regular season of the Nationalliga A, the main professional ice hockey league in Switzerland.

The season started on September 9, 2005, and the last league qualification game was played on April 17, 2006.

== Regular season ==
=== Final standings ===
| | Team | GP | W | L | T | GF | GA | Pts |
|---|---|---|---|---|---|---|---|---|
| 1. | SC Bern | 44 | 28 | 14 | 2 | 142 | 106 | 58 |
| 2. | HC Lugano | 44 | 24 | 12 | 4 | 160 | 116 | 56 |
| 3. | HC Davos | 44 | 23 | 16 | 5 | 136 | 110 | 51 |
| 4. | Rapperswil-Jona Lakers | 44 | 20 | 17 | 7 | 129 | 124 | 47 |
| 5. | EV Zug | 44 | 20 | 19 | 5 | 142 | 146 | 45 |
| 6. | EHC Basel | 44 | 18 | 17 | 9 | 107 | 126 | 45 |
| 7. | HC Ambri-Piotta | 44 | 20 | 22 | 2 | 137 | 130 | 42 |
| 8. | Kloten Flyers | 44 | 16 | 20 | 8 | 122 | 128 | 40 |
| 9. | HC Fribourg-Gottéron | 44 | 17 | 21 | 6 | 136 | 154 | 40 |
| 10. | ZSC Lions | 44 | 18 | 23 | 3 | 131 | 142 | 39 |
| 11. | Genève-Servette HC | 44 | 16 | 21 | 7 | 132 | 145 | 39 |
| 12. | SCL Tigers | 44 | 10 | 28 | 6 | 101 | 148 | 25 |

=== Scoring leaders ===
Note: GP = Games played; G = Goals; A = Assists; Pts = Points; PIM = Penalty Minutes

| Player | Team | GP | G | A | Pts | PIM |
|---|---|---|---|---|---|---|
| Glen Metropolit | HC Lugano | 44 | 23 | 42 | 65 | 60 |
| Hnat Domenichelli | HC Ambri-Piotta | 44 | 35 | 24 | 59 | 18 |
| Jean-Guy Trudel | HC Ambri-Piotta | 44 | 24 | 35 | 59 | 48 |
| Sébastien Bordeleau | SC Bern | 44 | 24 | 30 | 54 | 56 |
| Patrick Fischer | EV Zug | 44 | 21 | 32 | 53 | 72 |
| Kimmo Rintanen | Kloten Flyers | 44 | 23 | 26 | 49 | 36 |
| Ville Peltonen | HC Lugano | 39 | 23 | 25 | 48 | 22 |
| Reto von Arx | HC Davos | 44 | 14 | 34 | 48 | 76 |
| Petteri Nummelin | HC Lugano | 38 | 13 | 33 | 46 | 22 |
| Christian Berglund | Rapperswil-Jona Lakers | 44 | 24 | 20 | 44 | 124 |

== Playoffs ==
=== Tournament Bracket ===
Quarterfinals
1 | SC Bern | 2
8 | Kloten Flyers | 4
2 | HC Lugano | 4
7 | HC Ambri-Piotta | 3
(Pairings are reseeded after the first round)
3 | HC Davos | 4
6 | EHC Basel | 1
4 | Rapperswil-Jona Lakers | 4
5 | EV Zug | 3

Semifinals
2 | Lugano | 4
8 | Kloten | 1
3 | Davos | 4
4 | Lakers | 1

Final
2 | Lugano | 4
3 | Davos | 1

=== Quarterfinals Results ===
SC Bern (1) vs. Kloten Flyers (8)
| Date | Away | Score | | Home |
|---|---|---|---|---|
| February 24 | Kloten | 0 | 3 | Bern |
| February 27 | Bern | 1 | 2 | Kloten |
| March 1 | Kloten | 6 | 3 | Bern |
| March 3 | Bern | 2 | 3 | Kloten |
| March 6 | Kloten | 0 | 3 | Bern |
| March 8 | Bern | 3 | 6 | Kloten |
Kloten Flyers wins series 4–2

HC Davos (3) vs. EHC Basel (6)
| Date | Away | Score | | Home |
|---|---|---|---|---|
| February 24 | Basel | 2 | 5 | Davos |
| February 27 | Davos | 1 | 3 | Basel |
| March 1 | Basel | 1 | 10 | Davos |
| March 3 | Davos | 5 | 2 | Basel |
| March 6 | Basel | 2 | 2 | Davos |
HC Davos wins series 4–1

HC Lugano (2) vs. HC Ambri-Piotta (7)
| Date | Away | Score | | Home |
|---|---|---|---|---|
| February 24 | Ambri-Piotta | 4 | 3 | Lugano |
| February 27 | Lugano | 0 | 3 | Ambri-Piotta |
| March 1 | Ambri-Piotta | 5 | 4 | Lugano |
| March 3 | Lugano | 5 | 4 | Ambri-Piotta |
| March 6 | Ambri-Piotta | 1 | 2 | Lugano |
| March 8 | Lugano | 5 | 2 | Ambri-Piotta |
| March 10 | Ambri-Piotta | 1 | 5 | Lugano |
HC Lugano wins series 4–3

Rapperswil-Jona Lakers (4) vs. EV Zug (5)
| Date | Away | Score | | Home |
|---|---|---|---|---|
| February 24 | Zug | 1 | 6 | Lakers |
| February 27 | Lakers | 0 | 2 | Zug |
| March 1 | Zug | 1 | 3 | Lakers |
| March 3 | Lakers | 3 | 5 | Zug |
| March 6 | Zug | 2 | 1 | Lakers |
| March 8 | Lakers | 5 | 2 | Zug |
| March 10 | Zug | 3 | 5 | Lakers |
Rapperswil-Jona Lakers wins series 4–3

=== Semifinals Results ===
HC Lugano (2) vs. Kloten Flyers (8)
| Date | Away | Score | | Home |
|---|---|---|---|---|
| March 13 | Kloten | 3 | 2 | Lugano |
| March 15 | Lugano | 6 | 4 | Kloten |
| March 17 | Lugano | 3 | 0 | Kloten |
| March 20 | Kloten | 2 | 3 | Lugano |
| March 22 | Lugano | 5 | 0 | Kloten |
HC Lugano wins series 4–1

HC Davos (3) vs. Rapperswil-Jona Lakers (4)
| Date | Away | Score | | Home |
|---|---|---|---|---|
| March 13 | Lakers | 2 | 4 | Davos |
| March 15 | Davos | 5 | 2 | Lakers |
| March 17 | Lakers | 4 | 2 | Davos |
| March 20 | Davos | 3 | 1 | Lakers |
| March 22 | Lakers | 0 | 5 | Davos |
HC Davos wins series 4–1

=== Finals Results ===
HC Lugano (2) vs. HC Davos (3)
| Date | Away | Score | | Home |
|---|---|---|---|---|
| March 29 | Davos | 0 | 5 | Lugano |
| March 31 | Lugano | 3 | 5 | Davos |
| April 3 | Davos | 3 | 7 | Lugano |
| April 5 | Lugano | 8 | 2 | Davos |
| April 7 | Davos | 1 | 3 | Lugano |
HC Lugano wins series 4–1

=== Scoring leaders ===
Note: GP = Games played; G = Goals; A = Assists; Pts = Points; PIM = Penalty Minutes

| Player | Team | GP | G | A | Pts | PIM |
|---|---|---|---|---|---|---|
| Petteri Nummelin | HC Lugano | 17 | 8 | 25 | 33 | 10 |
| Ville Peltonen | HC Lugano | 17 | 12 | 14 | 26 | 8 |
| Glen Metropolit | HC Lugano | 17 | 9 | 17 | 26 | 8 |
| Sandy Jeannin | HC Lugano | 16 | 8 | 12 | 20 | 4 |
| Claudio Micheli | Rapperswil-Jona Lakers | 12 | 10 | 7 | 17 | 16 |
| Reto von Arx | HC Davos | 15 | 6 | 11 | 17 | 14 |
| Ryan Gardner | HC Lugano | 17 | 8 | 7 | 15 | 18 |
| Jukka Hentunen | HC Lugano | 17 | 7 | 6 | 13 | 6 |
| Rafaele Sannitz | HC Lugano | 17 | 5 | 8 | 13 | 16 |
| Michel Riesen | HC Davos | 15 | 9 | 3 | 12 | 8 |

== Playout ==
=== Semifinals ===
Fribourg-Gottéron (9) vs. SCL Tigers (12)
| Date | Away | Home |
|---|---|---|
| February 24 | SCL Tigers 6 | 5 Fribourg-Gottéron |
| February 27 | Fribourg-Gottéron 4 | 5 SCL Tigers |
| March 1 | SCL Tigers 3 | 5 Fribourg-Gottéron |
| March 3 | Fribourg-Gottéron 1 | 5 SCL Tigers |
| March 6 | SCL Tigers 3 | 4 Fribourg-Gottéron |
| March 8 | Fribourg-Gottéron 3 | 6 SCL Tigers |
SCL Tigers wins series 4–2

ZSC Lions (10) vs. Genève-Servette HC (11)
| Date | Away | Home |
|---|---|---|
| February 24 | Genève-Servette HC 5 | 2 ZSC Lions |
| February 27 | ZSC Lions 3 | 4 Genève-Servette HC |
| March 1 | Genève-Servette HC 3 | 4 ZSC Lions |
| March 3 | ZSC Lions 3 | 0 Genève-Servette HC |
| March 6 | Genève-Servette HC 3 | 2 ZSC Lions |
| March 8 | ZSC Lions 4 | 5 Genève-Servette HC |
Genève-Servette HC wins series 4–2

=== Finals ===
Fribourg-Gottéron vs. ZSC Lions
| Date | Away | Home |
|---|---|---|
| March 13 | ZSC Lions 2 | 0 Fribourg-Gottéron |
| March 15 | Fribourg-Gottéron 2 | 3 ZSC Lions |
| March 17 | ZSC Lions 5 | 2 Fribourg-Gottéron |
| March 20 | Fribourg-Gottéron 1 | 5 ZSC Lions |
ZSC Lions wins series 4–0

== League qualification ==
Fribourg-Gottéron vs. EHC Biel
| Date | Away | Home |
|---|---|---|
| March 29 | EHC Biel 3 | 6 Fribourg-Gottéron |
| March 31 | Fribourg-Gottéron 3 | 2 EHC Biel |
| April 3 | EHC Biel 5 | 1 Fribourg-Gottéron |
| April 5 | Fribourg-Gottéron 7 | 2 EHC Biel |
| April 7 | EHC Biel 3 | 1 Fribourg-Gottéron |
| April 12 | Fribourg-Gottéron 5 | 3 EHC Biel |
Fribourg-Gottéron wins series 4–2

== Results from Puck.ch ==
- LNA Regular Season 2005-2006
- Playoff 2005-2006
- Playout 2005-2006
- LNA/LNB League Qualification 2005-2006
