= Malek (surname) =

Malek is a surname. Notable people with the name include:

- Ahmed Malek (1931–2008), Algerian artist, music film composer and conductor
- Alia Malek (born 1974), American journalist and lawyer
- Amy Malek (c. 1979/1980), American scholar, and sociocultural anthropologist
- Fred Malek (born 1936), American business executive, political advisor, and philanthropist
- George Malek-Yonan (1924–2014), Iranian Assyrian international attorney, politician, and athlete
- Hasan Malek (born 1946), Malaysian politician
- Leona Alford Malek (1878–1953), American home economist, editor, and writer
- Milton Malek-Yonan (1904–2002), Iranian Assyrian entrepreneur and inventor.
- Miklós Malek (composer) (born 1945), Hungarian classical composer, arranger, and musician
- Miklós Malek (musician), aka Miklós Malek Jr., (born 1975), Hungarian pop music songwriter, producer, artist, and television personality, son of composer Miklós Malek above
- Rami Malek (born 1981), American actor of Egyptian descent
- Roman Málek (born 1977), Czech ice hockey player
- Rosie Malek-Yonan (born 1965), Assyrian-American actress, author, director, public figure, and activist
- Yusuf Malek, Iranian-Iraqi Assyrian politician

== See also ==
- Málek, Czech surname
- Małek, Polish surname
- Malek (given name)
