= Ryan Parent =

Canadian ice hockey player (born 1987)

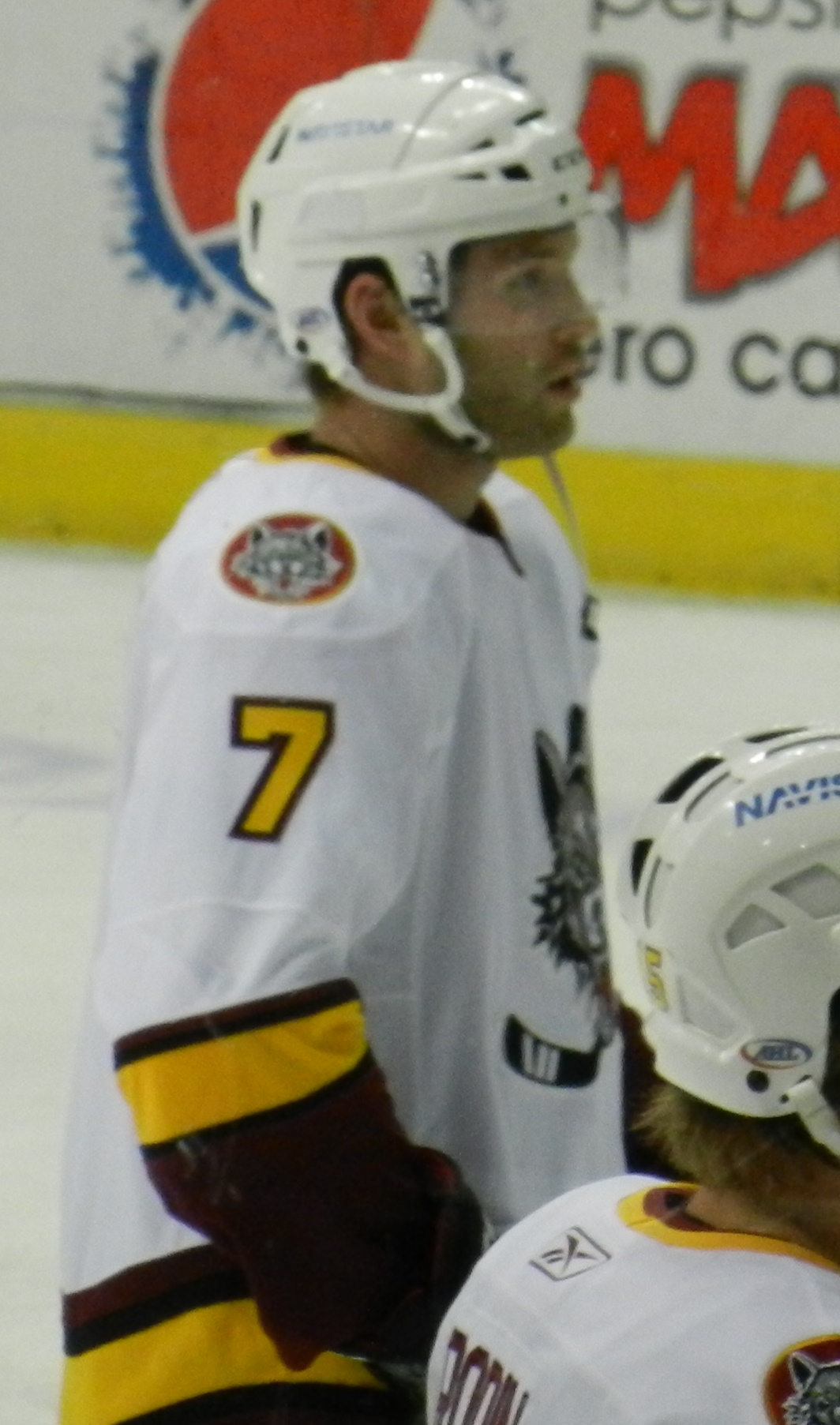
- Parent with the Chicago Wolves
- Born: March 17, 1987 (age 39) Prince Albert, Saskatchewan, Canada
- Height: 6 ft 3 in (191 cm)
- Weight: 198 lb (90 kg; 14 st 2 lb)
- Position: Defence
- Shot: Left
- Played for: Philadelphia Flyers; Vancouver Canucks
- NHL draft: 18th overall, 2005; Nashville Predators
- Playing career: 2006–2016

Ryan Parent (born March 17, 1987) is a Canadian former professional ice hockey defenceman who played for the Philadelphia Flyers and the Vancouver Canucks of the National Hockey League (NHL). He is currently head coach with the Utica Comets.

== Playing career ==
Parent who was born in Prince Albert, Saskatchewan, grew up in the remote town of Sioux Lookout, Ontario, playing minor hockey for the Flyers rep program until his minor bantam year. At age 15, he played AAA hockey for the Thunder Bay Kings Bantam team and was a teammate of future NHL'ers Tom Pyatt and Marc Staal. Parent was then signed by the Waterloo Siskins Jr. B. team for the 2002-03 season before being drafted by the Guelph Storm in the 1st round (8th overall) in the 2003 OHL Priority Selection.

Parent was drafted by the Nashville Predators in the first round, 18th overall, in the 2005 NHL entry draft. After playing three seasons in the Ontario Hockey League with the Guelph Storm, Parent joined the Milwaukee Admirals for the 2006 American Hockey League playoffs. He returned to the Guelph Storm for the 2006–07 season. Parent also played on both Canada's 2006 and 2007 World Jr. Hockey Championship gold-medal winning teams.

On February 15, 2007, Parent was traded along with Scottie Upshall, a 1st-round draft pick, and a 3rd-round draft pick to the Philadelphia Flyers in exchange for Peter Forsberg. On April 5, 2007, Parent made his NHL debut with the Flyers against the New Jersey Devils. He scored his first NHL goal during the 2009–10 season in a 7-4 Flyers loss against the Florida Panthers.

Parent is considered a defensive specialist and he has been often compared to NHL players Scott Hannan and Robyn Regehr. He was nicknamed "Bernie" by his Flyers teammates because of former Flyers net minder Bernie Parent. The two are not related and pronounce their last names differently.

On June 19, 2010, Parent was traded back to the Nashville Predators for the rights to Dan Hamhuis and a conditional draft pick in 2011 (in case Philadelphia did not sign Hamhuis). However, before the regular season began Parent was traded to the Vancouver Canucks along with Jonas Andersson for Shane O'Brien and Dan Gendur. Vancouver then put Parent on waivers. Parent cleared waivers but wasn't demoted immediately. He dressed for 4 games for the Canucks before he injured his groin. When he recovered, he was reassigned to the Canucks' AHL affiliate, the Manitoba Moose. He was recalled to the Canucks several times over the 2010-11 season, but didn't dress for another NHL game. Before the 2011-12 season, Parent was assigned by the Canucks to their new AHL affiliate, the Chicago Wolves. Parent was loaned to Team Canada for the 2011 Spengler Cup.

An unrestricted free agent going into the 2012–13 season due to the NHL lock-out, Parent was signed to a professional try-out contract with the Norfolk Admirals of the AHL on October 24, 2012. Parent was later signed by NHL affiliate, the Anaheim Ducks, on a one-year contract on January 16, 2013.

== Coaching career ==
On August 23, 2018, Parent was named as an assistant coach for the Binghamton Devils. He became interim head coach of the Utica Comets on November 6, 2024 when Kevin Dineen was fired.

== Career statistics ==
=== Regular season and playoffs ===
			Regular season					Playoffs
Season	Team	League	GP	G	A	Pts	PIM	GP	G	A	Pts	PIM
2002–03	Waterloo Siskins	MWJHL	41	2	8	10	36	4	0	1	1	0
2003–04	Guelph Storm	OHL	58	1	5	6	18	22	0	0	0	2
2004–05	Guelph Storm	OHL	66	2	17	19	36	4	0	1	1	4
2005–06	Guelph Storm	OHL	60	4	17	21	122	15	1	4	5	24
2005–06	Milwaukee Admirals	AHL	—	—	—	—	—	10	0	0	0	14
2006–07	Guelph Storm	OHL	43	3	7	10	86	4	0	1	1	14
2006–07	Philadelphia Phantoms	AHL	6	1	0	1	4	—	—	—	—	—
2006–07	Philadelphia Flyers	NHL	1	0	0	0	0	—	—	—	—	—
2007–08	Philadelphia Phantoms	AHL	53	1	7	8	42	—	—	—	—	—
2007–08	Philadelphia Flyers	NHL	22	0	0	0	6	4	0	1	1	0
2008–09	Philadelphia Phantoms	AHL	15	0	1	1	18	—	—	—	—	—
2008–09	Philadelphia Flyers	NHL	31	0	4	4	10	6	0	0	0	6
2009–10	Philadelphia Flyers	NHL	48	1	2	3	20	17	1	0	1	2
2010–11	Vancouver Canucks	NHL	4	0	0	0	0	—	—	—	—	—
2010–11	Manitoba Moose	AHL	39	1	1	2	56	—	—	—	—	—
2011–12	Chicago Wolves	AHL	22	1	5	6	31	5	0	1	1	10
2012–13	Norfolk Admirals	AHL	56	0	5	5	52	—	—	—	—	—
2013–14	Norfolk Admirals	AHL	26	0	3	3	26	5	0	0	0	4
2014–15	Ontario Reign	ECHL	6	0	1	1	0	—	—	—	—	—
2014–15	St. John's IceCaps	AHL	22	0	2	2	16	—	—	—	—	—
2014–15	Wilkes–Barre/Scranton Penguins	AHL	—	—	—	—	—	2	0	0	0	0
2015–16	Wilkes–Barre/Scranton Penguins	AHL	12	0	0	0	16	9	0	2	2	8
AHL totals			251	4	24	28	261	31	0	3	3	26
NHL totals			106	1	6	7	36	27	1	1	2	8

=== International ===
Medal record

Representing Canada

Ice hockey

World Junior Championships
Gold medal – first place	2007 Sweden	
Gold medal – first place	2006 Canada	

Representing Canada

IIHF World U18 Championship
Silver medal – second place	2005 Czech Republic	

Ivan Hlinka Memorial Tournament
Gold medal – first place	2004 Břeclav/Holodín/Pieštany	

Representing Canada Ontario

World U-17 Hockey Challenge
Silver medal – second place	2004 St. John's	

Year	Team	Event	Result	GP	G	A	Pts	PIM
2004	Canada Ontario	U17	1st place, gold medalist(s)	6	0	1	1	4
2004	Canada	U18	1st place, gold medalist(s)	5	1	2	3	12
2005	Canada	WJC18	2nd place, silver medalist(s)	6	0	0	0	6
2006	Canada	WJC	1st place, gold medalist(s)	6	0	0	0	12
2007	Canada	WJC	1st place, gold medalist(s)	6	0	0	0	6
Junior totals				29	1	3	4	40

== Awards and honours ==
Award	Year
OHL
Second All-Star Team	2006, 2007

Awards and achievements
Preceded by Alexander Radulov	Nashville Predators first-round draft pick 2005	Succeeded by Jonathon Blum
