= Janusz Małek =

Polish footballer

Personal information
- Date of birth: 10 February 1958 (age 68)
- Place of birth: Chmiel-Kolonia, Poland
- Height: 1.84 m (6 ft 0 in)
- Position: Defender

Senior career*
Years	Team	Apps	(Gls)
1980–1981	Stal Kraśnik		
1981–1984	Lech Poznań	62	(0)
1984–1994	Polonia Bytom		
1995–1997	Krisbut Myszków		
1997–1998	Szombierki Bytom		
1998–1999	KS Myszków		
2015	UKS Szopienice		
2018	Polonia Bytom II		
- * Club domestic league appearances and goals

Janusz Małek (born 10 February 1958) is a Polish former professional footballer who played as a defender.

== Honours ==
Lech Poznań

- Ekstraklasa: 1982–83
- Polish Cup: 1981–82
