= Petr Sýkora (ice hockey, born 1978) =

Czech ice hockey player (born 1978)

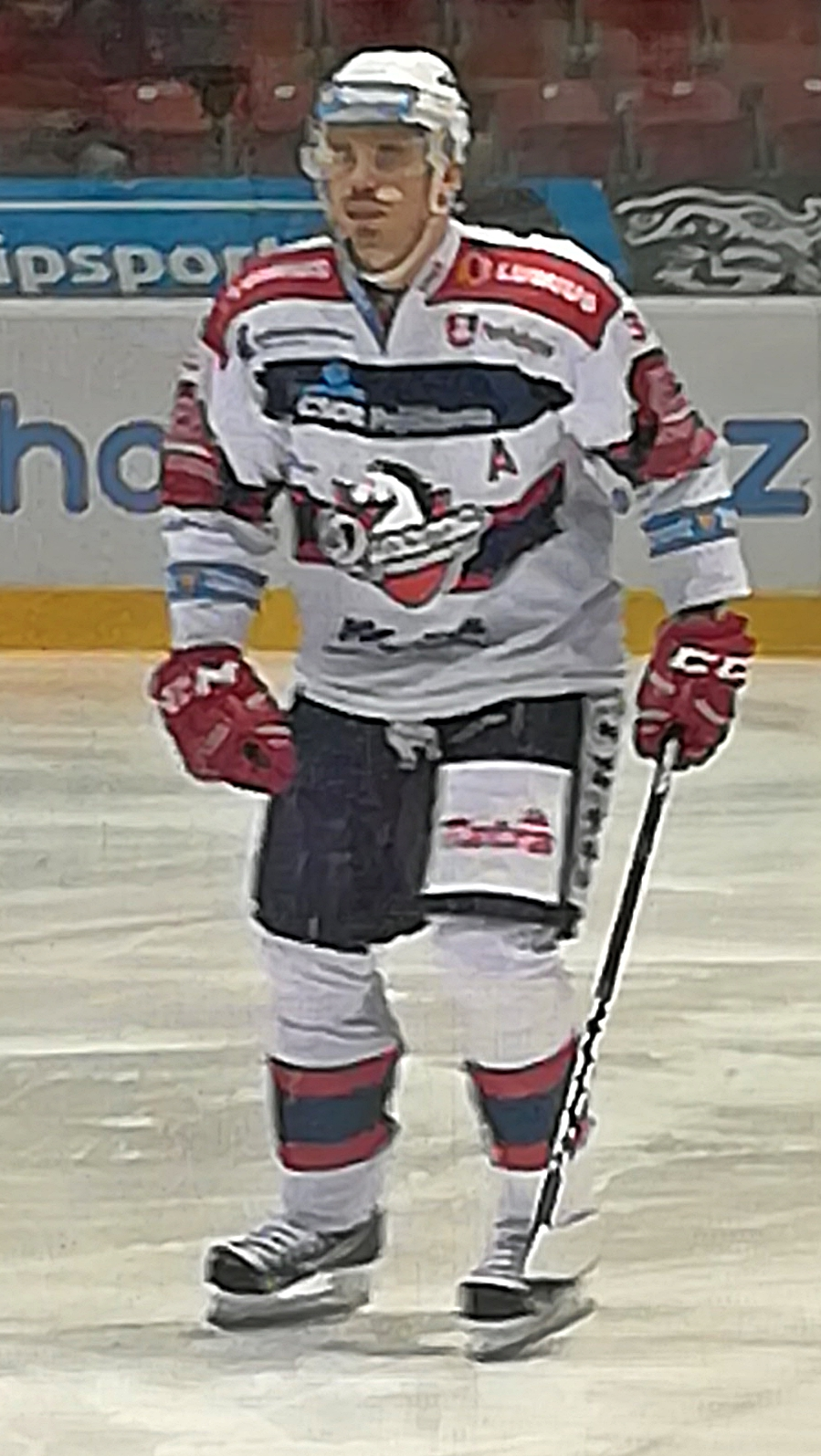
- Petr Sýkora
- Born: December 21, 1978 (age 47) Pardubice, Czechoslovakia
- Height: 6 ft 1 in (185 cm)
- Weight: 167 lb (76 kg; 11 st 13 lb)
- Position: Centre
- Shot: Right
- Czech Extraliga team Former teams: HC Dynamo Pardubice; Nashville Predators; Washington Capitals
- National team: Czech Republic
- NHL draft: 76th overall, 1997; Detroit Red Wings
- Playing career: 1998–2020

Petr Sýkora (born December 21, 1978) is a Czech former ice hockey player. He played 12 games in the National Hockey League with the Nashville Predators and Washington Capitals between 1999 and 2005. The rest of his career, which lasted from 1998 to 2020, was mainly spent in the Czech Extraliga. Internationally he played for the Czech national team at the 2007 World Championships. He is the younger brother of former NHL defenceman Michal Sýkora.

== Playing career ==
Sýkora was drafted by the Detroit Red Wings in the 1997 NHL entry draft in the 3rd round, 76th overall. On July 14, 1998, the Red Wings traded him (along with future considerations and a third-round pick in the 1999 NHL entry draft) to the Nashville Predators for Doug Brown. Sýkora suited up for two games for the Predators in the 1998–99 season and did not play in the NHL again until the 2005–06 NHL season. That season, he played ten games for the Washington Capitals, ultimately leaving the United States after finding the cultural transition difficult.

In his time away from the NHL, Sýkora played for HC Pardubice in the Czech Extraliga and HC Davos of the Swiss Nationalliga A.

== Career statistics ==
=== Regular season and playoffs ===
			Regular season					Playoffs
Season	Team	League	GP	G	A	Pts	PIM	GP	G	A	Pts	PIM
1994–95	HC Pardubice	CZE U20	38	35	33	68	—	—	—	—	—	—
1995–96	HC Pojišťovna IB Pardubice	CZE U20	26	13	9	22	—	—	—	—	—	—
1996–97	HC Pojišťovna IB Pardubice	CZE U20	12	14	4	18	—	—	—	—	—	—
1996–97	HC Pojišťovna IB Pardubice	CZE	28	1	3	4	2	—	—	—	—	—
1997–98	HC IPB Pojišťovna Pardubice	CZE	39	4	4	8	6	3	0	0	0	0
1998–99	Nashville Predators	NHL	2	0	0	0	0	—	—	—	—	—
1998–99	Milwaukee Admirals	IHL	73	14	15	29	50	2	1	1	2	0
1999–00	Milwaukee Admirals	IHL	3	0	1	1	2	—	—	—	—	—
1999–00	HC IPB Pojišťovna Pardubice	CZE	36	7	13	20	51	3	0	0	0	2
2000–01	HC IPB Pojišťovna Pardubice	CZE	47	26	18	44	42	7	5	3	8	6
2001–02	HC IPB Pojišťovna Pardubice	CZE	32	14	8	22	72	6	1	2	3	26
2002–03	HC ČSOB Pojišťovna Pardubice	CZE	45	18	18	36	86	19	3	3	6	39
2003–04	HC Moeller Pardubice	CZE	48	23	23	46	20	7	1	0	1	6
2004–05	HC Moeller Pardubice	CZE	43	25	10	35	28	16	3	2	5	33
2005–06	Washington Capitals	NHL	10	2	2	4	6	—	—	—	—	—
2005–06	HC Moeller Pardubice	CZE	28	11	14	25	46	—	—	—	—	—
2006–07	HC Moeller Pardubice	CZE	50	37	16	53	76	18	12	6	18	22
2007–08	HC Moeller Pardubice	CZE	42	23	8	31	38	—	—	—	—	—
2008–09	HC Davos	NLA	49	23	16	39	20	18	8	3	11	6
2009–10	HC Eaton Pardubice	CZE	48	27	15	42	56	13	12	4	16	10
2010–11	HC Davos	NLA	43	35	15	50	18	9	1	2	3	2
2011–12	HC Davos	NLA	46	21	28	49	4	4	0	0	0	2
2012–13	HC Davos	NLA	32	16	12	28	16	7	2	1	3	6
2013–14	HC ČSOB Pojišťovna Pardubice	CZE	47	17	14	31	84	10	5	3	8	0
2014–15	HC ČSOB Pojišťovna Pardubice	CZE	48	26	18	44	50	9	5	3	8	6
2015–16	HC Dynamo Pardubice	CZE	47	22	12	34	62	—	—	—	—	—
2016–17	HC Dynamo Pardubice	CZE	48	21	14	35	24	—	—	—	—	—
2017–18	HC Dynamo Pardubice	CZE	44	16	17	33	30	7	0	1	1	2
2018–19	HC Dynamo Pardubice	CZE	42	9	10	19	16	—	—	—	—	—
2019–20	HC Stadion Vrchlabí	CZE-3	38	38	29	67	8	—	—	—	—	—
CZE totals			762	327	235	562	789	118	47	27	74	152
NHL totals			12	2	2	4	6	—	—	—	—	—

=== International ===
Year	Team	Event	GP	G	A	Pts	PIM
1998	Czech Republic	WJC	7	2	2	4	2
2007	Czech Republic	WC	7	2	3	5	4
Junior totals			7	2	2	4	2
Senior totals			7	2	3	5	4
