= Lukas Lang =

Czech-born German ice hockey player

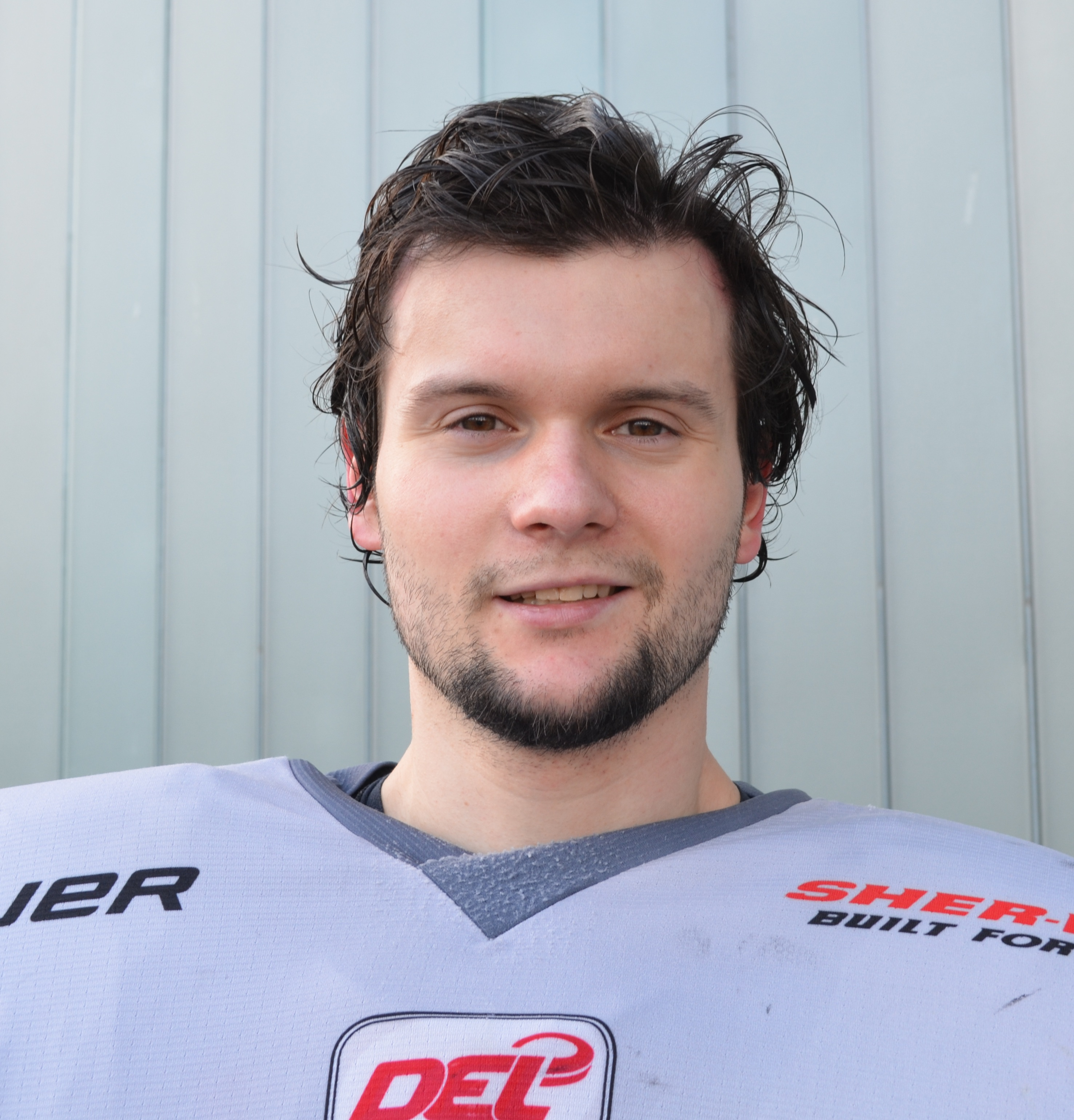
- Born: July 27, 1986 (age 38); Bruenn, Czechoslovakia
- Height: 6 ft 1 in (185 cm)
- Weight: 185 lb (84 kg; 13 st 3 lb)
- Position: Goaltender
- Shot: Left
- Played for: Nürnberg Ice Tigers; Füchse Duisburg; Adler Mannheim; Grizzly Adams Wolfsburg; Krefeld Pinguine; Düsseldorfer EG; EHC München
- Playing career: 2003–2016

Lukas Lang (born July 27, 1986) is a Czech-born German professional ice hockey goaltender. He is the son of former Czechoslovak international goaltender Karel Lang.

== Playing career ==
Lang signed a one-year contract, after a successful season with Schwenninger Wild Wings of the 2nd Bundesliga, with Krefeld Pinguine on May 3, 2013.

After a stint as backup with Düsseldorfer EG in the 2014–15 season, Lang continued his journeyman career initially agreeing to terms with EV Landshut of the DEL2 before signing with EHC München of the DEL to a one-year contract on August 15, 2015.
