= Roberts Bukarts =

Latvian ice hockey player (born 1990)

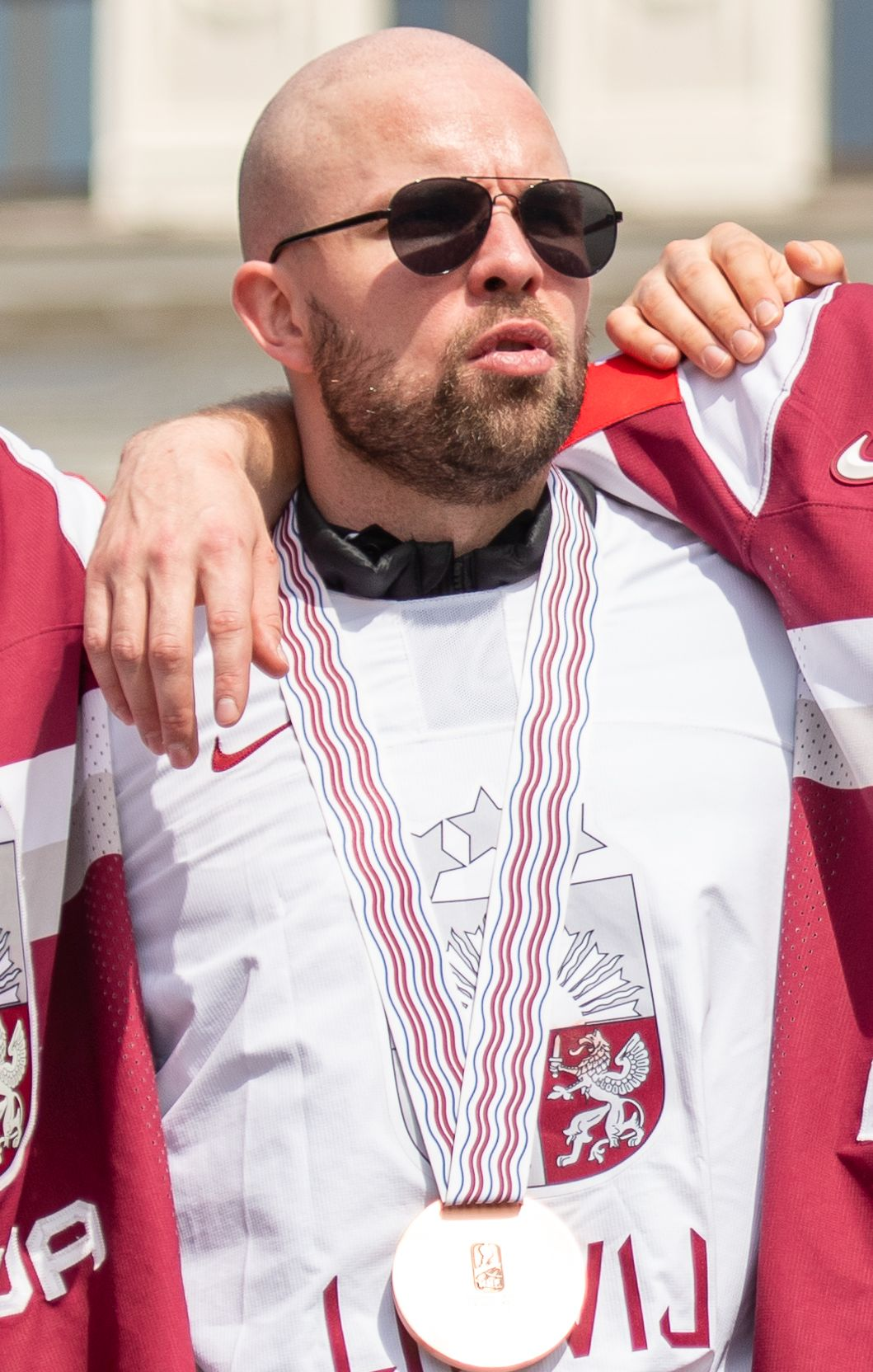
- Roberts Bukarts, 2023
- Born: June 27, 1990 (age 36) Jūrmala, Latvia
- Height: 6 ft 0 in (183 cm)
- Weight: 181 lb (82 kg; 12 st 13 lb)
- Position: Forward
- Shoots: Right
- Slovak team Former teams: HK Dukla Trenčín; Dinamo Riga; PSG Zlín; HC Oceláři Třinec; HC Sparta Praha; Severstal Cherepovets; HC Vítkovice Ridera; Pioneers Vorarlberg
- National team: Latvia
- Playing career: 2005–present

Roberts Bukarts (born June 27, 1990) is a Latvian professional ice hockey player who is a forward for HK Dukla Trenčín of the Slovak Extraliga.

== Playing career ==
Bukarts made his Kontinental Hockey League debut with Dinamo Riga during the 2009–10 season.

He has formerly played with PSG Zlín, HC Oceláři Třinec, HC Sparta Praha of the Czech Extraliga (EHL). He was a first round selection in the 2009 KHL Junior Draft.

== International play ==
Medal record

Representing Latvia

Ice hockey

World Championships
Bronze medal – third place	2023 Finland/Latvia	

Bukarts represented Latvia at the 2023 IIHF World Championship where he recorded two goals and one assist and won a bronze medal, Latvia's first ever IIHF World Championship medal.

== Career statistics ==
=== Regular season and playoffs ===
			Regular season					Playoffs
Season	Team	League	GP	G	A	Pts	PIM	GP	G	A	Pts	PIM
2008–09	Krylia Sovetov	RUS 2	44	11	6	17	12	—	—	—	—	—
2009–10	Dinamo Riga	KHL	32	3	4	7	4	3	1	0	1	0
2009–10	Dinamo-Juniors Riga	BXL	18	13	10	23	12	—	—	—	—	—
2010–11	Dinamo Riga	KHL	43	4	2	6	8	3	0	0	0	0
2010–11	HK Riga	MHL	43	12	21	14	6	3	3	2	5	2
2011–12	Dinamo Riga	KHL	26	3	3	6	0	7	0	0	0	4
2011–12	HK Riga	MHL	15	11	5	16	22	5	4	2	6	2
2012–13	Dinamo Riga	KHL	18	3	0	3	8	—	—	—	—	—
2012–13	Liepājas Metalurgs	BXL	14	6	4	10	4	—	—	—	—	—
2013–14	Dinamo Riga	KHL	37	4	8	12	14	6	1	3	4	4
2014–15	Dinamo Riga	KHL	43	6	8	14	16	—	—	—	—	—
2015–16	Dinamo Riga	KHL	7	2	0	2	0	—	—	—	—	—
2015–16	PSG Zlin	ELH	36	19	12	31	12	10	2	5	7	4
2016–17	PSG Zlin	ELH	50	19	18	37	26	—	—	—	—	—
2017–18	PSG Zlin	ELH	50	21	28	49	56	4	0	1	1	0
2018–19	HC Oceláři Třinec	ELH	33	5	14	19	10	—	—	—	—	—
2018–19	HC Sparta Praha	ELH	14	2	5	7	0	4	0	0	0	0
2019–20	HC Vítkovice Ridera	ELH	47	16	26	42	42	—	—	—	—	—
2020–21	Severstal Cherepovets	KHL	13	3	1	4	2	—	—	—	—	—
2020–21	Dinamo Riga	KHL	25	6	8	14	8	—	—	—	—	—
2021–22	HC Vítkovice Ridera	ELH	32	8	18	26	6	—	—	—	—	—
2022–23	HC Vítkovice Ridera	ELH	52	21	26	47	10	10	3	1	4	2
2023–24	HC Vítkovice Ridera	ELH	51	14	7	21	18	3	0	0	0	0
2024–25	HC Vítkovice Ridera	ELH	46	6	9	15	8	5	1	0	1	0
2025–26	Pioneers Vorarlberg	ICEHL	18	5	6	11	4	—	—	—	—	—
KHL totals			244	34	34	68	60	19	2	3	5	8
ELH totals			411	131	163	294	188	40	8	8	16	6
ICEHL totals			18	5	6	11	4	—	—	—	—	—

=== International ===
Year	Team	Event	GP	G	A	Pts	PIM
2006	Latvia	U18 D1	5	0	1	1	0
2007	Latvia	U18	6	1	3	4	0
2008	Latvia	U18 D1	5	4	3	7	2
2009	Latvia	WJC	6	4	2	6	10
2010	Latvia	WJC	6	6	1	7	4
2011	Latvia	WC	6	3	0	3	2
2012	Latvia	WC	3	0	0	0	0
2015	Latvia	WC	7	0	0	0	2
2016	Latvia	WC	7	1	3	4	0
2016	Latvia	OGQ	3	1	0	1	0
2017	Latvia	WC	7	0	5	5	4
2018	Latvia	WC	8	2	2	4	0
2019	Latvia	WC	7	4	0	4	2
2021	Latvia	WC	7	0	0	0	6
2021	Latvia	OGQ	3	0	2	2	0
2022	Latvia	WC	7	1	2	3	2
2023	Latvia	WC	10	2	1	3	0
2024	Latvia	WC	7	2	1	3	0
2025	Latvia	OGQ	3	3	0	3	0
2026	Latvia	OG	3	0	0	0	0
Junior totals			28	15	10	25	16
Senior totals			88	19	16	35	18
