= Niclas Lucenius =

Finnish ice hockey player (born 1989)

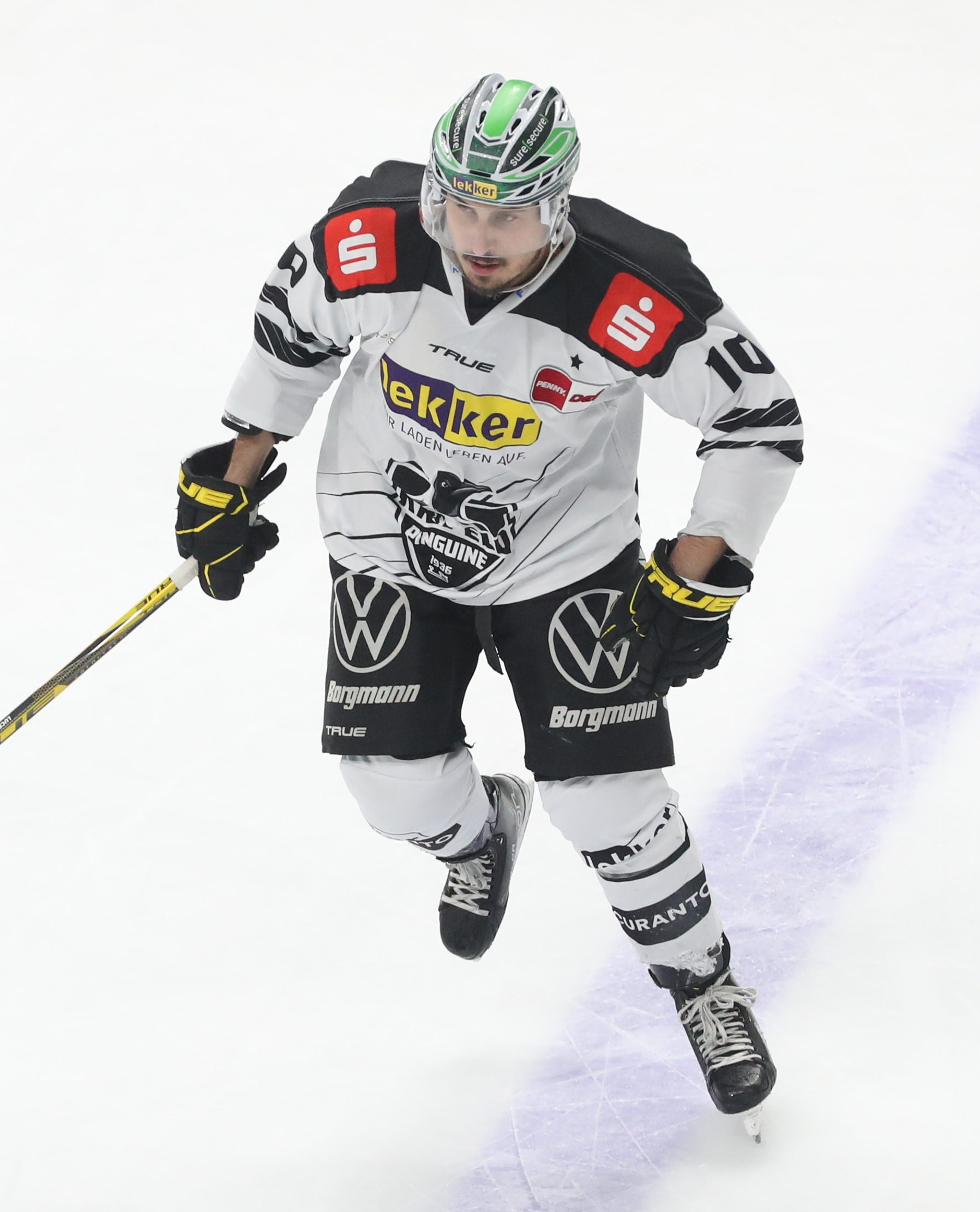
- Born: May 3, 1989 (age 37) Turku, Finland
- Height: 6 ft 0 in (183 cm)
- Weight: 189 lb (86 kg; 13 st 7 lb)
- Position: Centre
- Shoots: Left
- Liiga team Former teams: Vaasan Sport; Tappara; Dinamo Riga; HC TPS; SC Rapperswil-Jona Lakers; HC ’05 Banská Bystrica; HPK; Düsseldorfer EG
- NHL draft: 115th overall, 2007; Atlanta Thrashers
- Playing career: 2007–present

Niclas Lucenius (born May 3, 1989) is a Finnish professional ice hockey center. He is currently playing with Vaasan Sport of the Finnish Liiga. Lucenius was selected by the Atlanta Thrashers in the 4th round (115th overall) of the 2007 NHL entry draft.

Lucenius played for Tappara in SM-liiga from 2007 to 2011. He later reached agreement with Dinamo Riga played in Kontinental Hockey League in the 2011–12 season.

After parts of two seasons abroad, Lucenius returned to Finland during the 2016-17 season, joining LeKi of the Mestis.
