= Ondřej Šedivý =

Czech ice hockey player

- Born: September 30, 1989 (age 35); Bohumín, Czechoslovakia
- Height: 5 ft 11 in (180 cm)
- Weight: 183 lb (83 kg; 13 st 1 lb)
- Position: Right wing
- Shoots: Right
- Maxa liga team Former teams: HC Frýdek-Místek; HC Vítkovice; Orli Znojmo; HC TWK Innsbruck
- Playing career: 2009–present

Ondřej Šedivý (born September 30, 1989) is a Czech professional ice hockey player. He is currently under contract with HC Frýdek-Místek of the 1st Czech Republic Hockey League.

He previously played with home province club, HC Vítkovice in the Czech Extraliga during the 2010–11 Czech Extraliga season. and with HC TWK Innsbruck of the Austrian Hockey League (EBEL).
