= Deh Malek, Rabor =

Deh Malek ده ملك
- Village
- Location within Iran
- Coordinates: 28°56′41″N 57°03′41″E
- Country: Iran
- Province: Kerman
- County: Rabor
- Bakhsh: Hanza
- Rural District: Javaran

Population (2006)
  - Total: 52
- Time zone: UTC+3:30 (IRST)

Deh Malek (Persian: ده ملك) is a village in Javaran Rural District, Hanza District, Rabor County, Kerman Province, Iran. At the 2006 census, its population was 52, in 13 families.
