= Reto von Arx =

Swiss ice hockey player

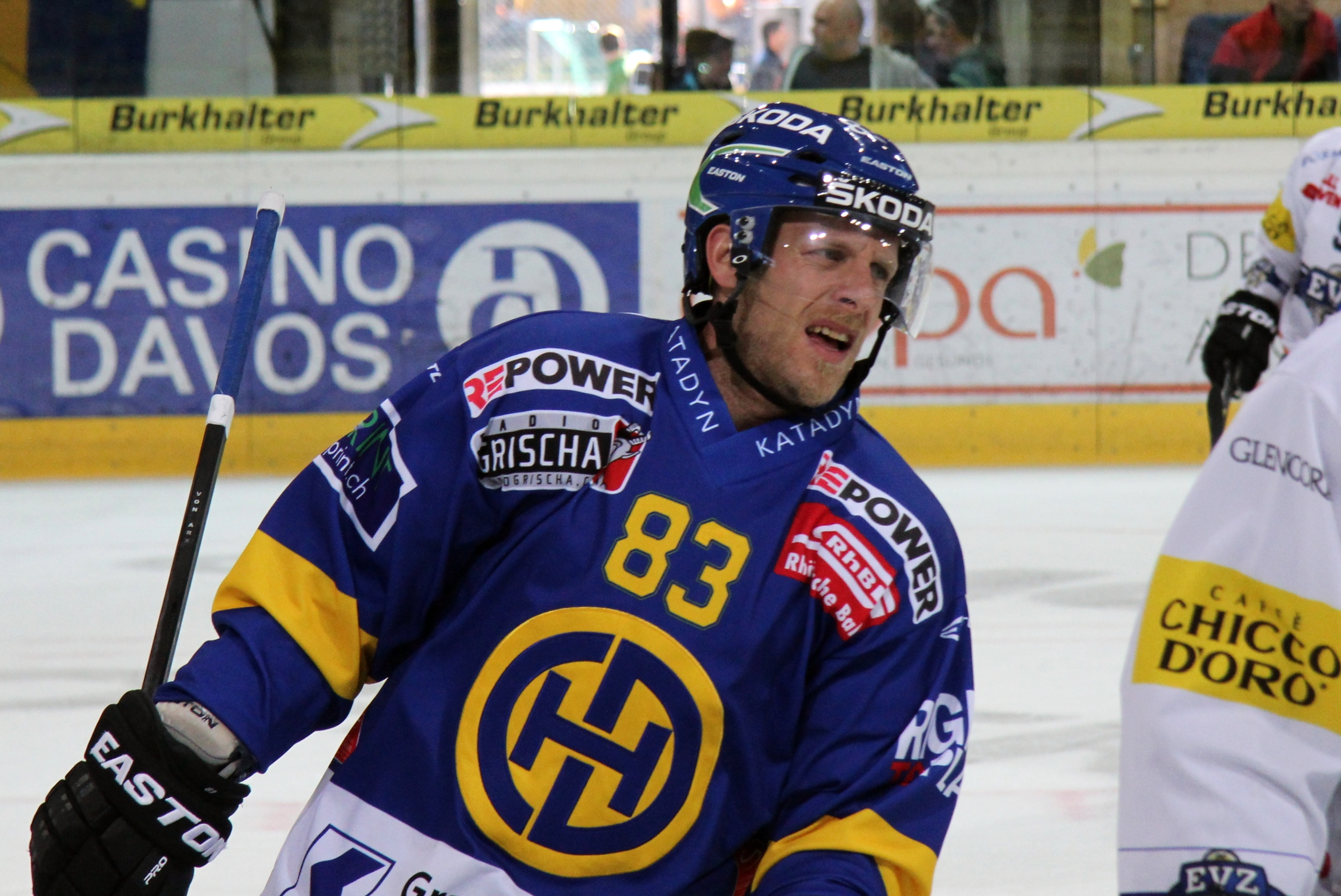
- Born: 13 September 1976 (age 49) Biel, Switzerland
- Height: 5 ft 11 in (180 cm)
- Weight: 190 lb (86 kg; 13 st 8 lb)
- Position: Centre
- Shot: Left
- Played for: HC Davos; Chicago Blackhawks
- National team: Switzerland
- NHL draft: 271st overall, 2000; Chicago Blackhawks
- Playing career: 1995–2015

Reto von Arx (born 13 September 1976) is a Swiss former ice hockey player. He played in the Swiss Nationalliga A from 1995 to 2015. He also played 19 games in the National Hockey League for the Chicago Blackhawks during the 2000–01 season. Internationally he played for the Swiss national team at multiple tournaments, including several World Championships and the 2002 Winter Olympics. He is currently the head coach of EHC Chur.

== Playing career ==
A product of SC Langnau, von Arx played in Switzerland's second division before signing with HC Davos of the top-flight National League A (NLA) in 1995.

Von Arx was drafted 271st overall in the 2000 NHL entry draft by the Chicago Blackhawks. He only played the 2000–01 season in the U.S. with the Blackhawks and affiliate the Norfolk Admirals before returning to Switzerland.

Von Arx retired from professional hockey after the 2014-15 NLA season. He played all his 1004 NLA games with HC Davos and won six Swiss championships with the club as well as two Spengler Cup titles (2006, 2011). He was named Most Valuable Player of the National League A three times (2001–02, 2005–06, 2008–09).

Internationally, he competed for Switzerland in the 2002 Olympic Games in Salt Lake City and at four World Championships.

== Coaching career ==
Before the 2015–16 season, he was named assistant coach for the Swiss national team along Felix Hollenstein and with former NHL player, Patrick Fischer as head coach. Von Arx remained in that job until July 2016 and then joined the coaching staff of the Swiss under-17 national team.

== Career statistics ==
=== Regular season and playoffs ===
			Regular season					Playoffs
Season	Team	League	GP	G	A	Pts	PIM	GP	G	A	Pts	PIM
1991–92	SC Langnau U20	SWI U20	—	—	—	—	—	—	—	—	—	—
1991–92	SC Langnau	SWI-3	1	0	0	0	0	—	—	—	—	—
1992–93	SC Langnau U20	SWI-U20	2	1	3	4	—	—	—	—	—	—
1992–93	SC Langnau	NLB	35	11	4	15	28	—	—	—	—	—
1993–94	SC Langnau U20	SWI-U20	8	4	10	14	—	—	—	—	—	—
1993–94	SC Langnau	SWI-3	32	35	31	66	42	3	2	2	4	—
1994–95	SC Langnau	NLB	36	14	9	23	72	5	1	2	3	27
1995–96	HC Davos	NDA	34	4	6	10	59	5	0	2	2	4
1996–97	HC Davos	NDA	42	10	17	27	78	6	1	3	4	4
1997–98	HC Davos	NDA	39	8	15	23	113	18	9	6	15	18
1998–99	HC Davos	NDA	45	21	20	41	76	6	4	6	10	16
1999–00	HC Davos	NLA	45	19	26	45	70	5	2	0	2	10
2000–01	Norfolk Admirals	AHL	49	16	26	42	28	9	1	2	3	8
2000–01	Chicago Blackhawks	NHL	19	3	1	4	4	—	—	—	—	—
2001–02	HC Davos	NLA	31	6	15	21	95	12	3	8	11	35
2002–03	HC Davos	NLA	42	10	32	42	71	17	4	8	12	28
2003–04	HC Davos	NLA	47	20	31	51	72	6	0	2	2	6
2004–05	HC Davos	NLA	43	11	27	38	75	15	4	3	7	24
2005–06	HC Davos	NLA	44	14	34	48	76	15	6	11	17	14
2006–07	HC Davos	NLA	38	11	38	49	46	19	2	8	10	38
2007–08	HC Davos	NLA	49	13	34	47	95	12	2	7	9	10
2008–09	HC Davos	NLA	44	15	24	39	80	21	7	8	15	16
2009–10	HC Davos	NLA	49	10	32	42	78	6	2	4	6	18
2010–11	HC Davos	NLA	49	15	33	48	54	14	1	11	12	6
2011–12	HC Davos	NLA	46	10	30	40	56	2	1	0	1	2
2012–13	HC Davos	NLA	42	11	19	30	54	5	2	3	5	4
2013–14	HC Davos	NLA	41	5	14	19	42	3	0	3	3	4
2014–15	HC Davos	NLA	43	1	10	11	26	4	1	1	2	2
NDA/NLA totals			813	214	457	671	1316	191	51	94	145	259
NHL totals			19	3	1	4	4	—	—	—	—	—

=== International ===
Year	Team	Event	GP	G	A	Pts	PIM
1993	Switzerland	EJC B	7	10	3	13	6
1995	Switzerland	WJC B	7	3	1	4	17
1996	Switzerland	WJC	6	5	2	7	35
1996	Switzerland	WC B	7	1	5	6	12
1997	Switzerland	WC B	7	1	4	5	6
1998	Switzerland	WC	9	2	2	4	12
1999	Switzerland	WC	6	2	2	4	10
2000	Switzerland	WC	7	1	2	3	2
2002	Switzerland	OLY	2	0	1	1	2
Junior totals			20	18	6	24	58
Senior totals			38	7	16	23	44
