= Ronnie Rüeger =

Swiss ice hockey player

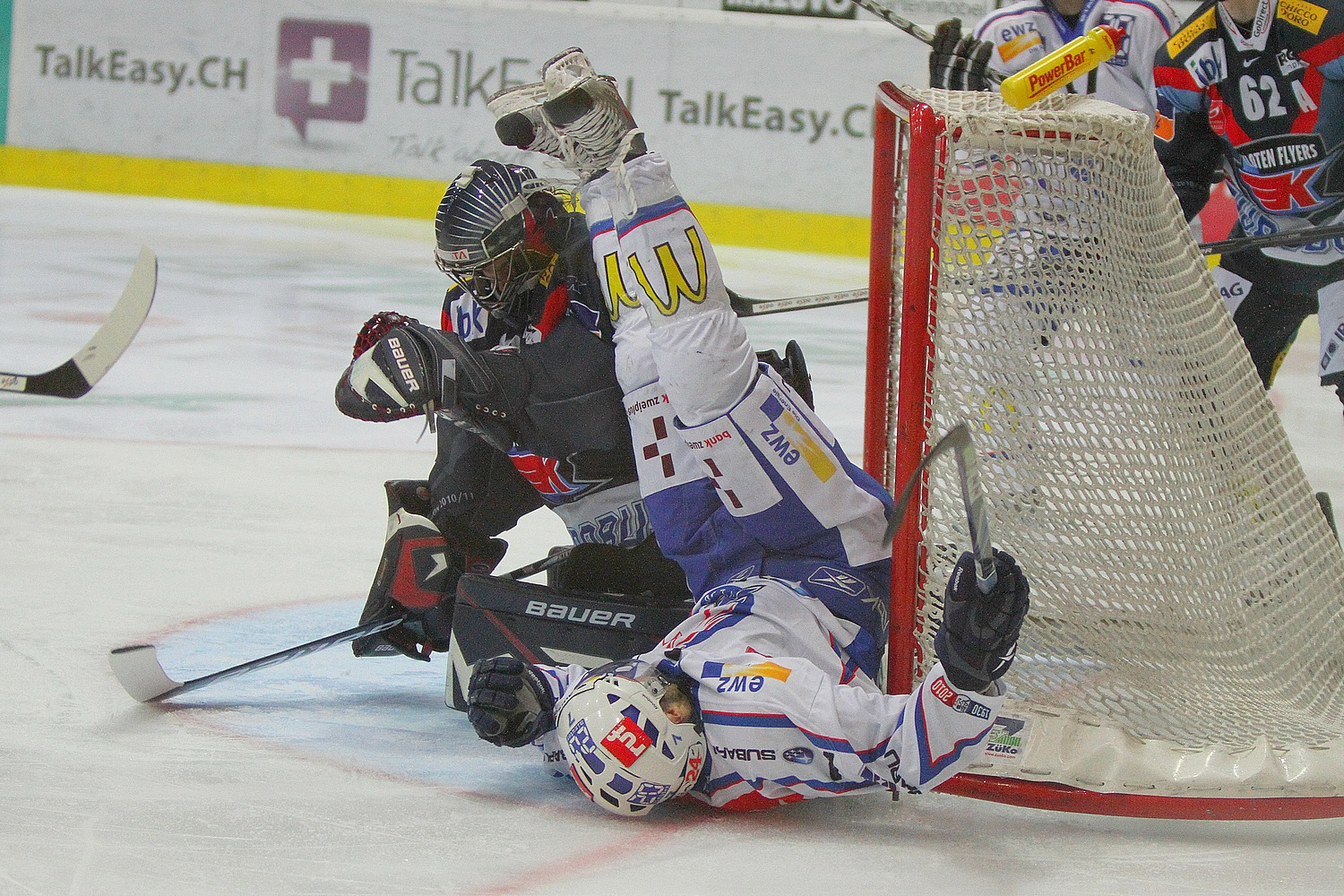
- Ronnie Rüeger (l) and Thibaut Monnet (r)
- Born: February 26, 1973 (age 52); Bülach, Switzerland
- Height: 6 ft 1 in (185 cm)
- Weight: 196 lb (89 kg; 14 st 0 lb)
- Position: Goaltender
- Caught: Left
- Played for: Kloten Flyers; HC Davos; HC Ambrì-Piotta; EV Zug; AIK IF; HC Lugano
- National team: Switzerland
- NHL draft: Undrafted
- Playing career: 1990–2013

Ronald Rüeger (born February 26, 1973, in Bülach, Switzerland) is a Swiss former professional ice hockey goaltender who played in the Swiss National League A (NLA). He also represented the Switzerland men's national ice hockey team on several occasions in the World Championships and Olympics in which he currently serves as a Goaltending Coach.
