= Moluk =

Moluk ملوك
- Village
- Location within Iran
- Coordinates: 38°55′06″N 47°08′25″E
- Country: Iran
- Province: East Azerbaijan
- County: Kaleybar
- Bakhsh: Central
- Rural District: Yeylaq

Population (2006)
  - Total: 116
- Time zone: UTC+3:30 (IRST)
  - Summer (DST): UTC+4:30 (IRDT)

Moluk (Persian: ملوك, also Romanized as Molūk and Malūk; also known as Malek and Molok) is a village in Yeylaq Rural District, in the Central District of Kaleybar County, East Azerbaijan Province, Iran. At the 2006 census, its population was 116, in 29 families.
