= Deh-e Maleku =

Deh-e Maleku ده ملكو
- Village
- Location within Iran
- Coordinates: 28°40′18″N 55°11′53″E
- Country: Iran
- Province: Fars
- County: Darab
- Bakhsh: Rostaq
- Rural District: Kuhestan

Population (2006)
  - Total: 96
- Time zone: UTC+3:30 (IRST)
  - Summer (DST): UTC+4:30 (IRDT)

Deh-e Maleku (Persian: ده ملكو, also Romanized as Deh-e Malekū; also known as Deh-e Malek) is a village in Kuhestan Rural District, Rostaq District, Darab County, Fars province, Iran. At the 2006 census, its population was 96, in 26 families.
