= Deh-e Malek, Kerman =

Deh-e Malek ده ملك
- Village
- Location within Iran
- Coordinates: 29°39′10″N 57°24′14″E
- Country: Iran
- Province: Kerman
- County: Kerman
- Bakhsh: Rayen
- Rural District: Rayen

Population (2006)
  - Total: 233
- Time zone: UTC+3:30 (IRST)

Deh-e Malek (Persian: ده ملك, also Romanized as Deh Malek; also known as Malek and Malik) is a village in Rayen Rural District, Rayen District, Kerman County, Kerman Province, Iran. At the 2006 census, its population was 233, in 51 families.
