= Roman Málek =

Czech ice hockey player

- Born: September 25, 1977 (age 48) Prague, Czechoslovakia
- Height: 5 ft 11 in (180 cm)
- Weight: 165 lb (75 kg; 11 st 11 lb)
- Position: Goaltender
- Caught: Left
- Played for: HC Slavia Praha; HC Plzeň; Metallurg Magnitogorsk; HC Karlovy Vary; Modo Hockey; HC Vítkovice; HC Sparta Praha; BK Mladá Boleslav
- National team: Czech Republic
- NHL draft: 158th overall, 2001; Philadelphia Flyers
- Playing career: 1997–2015

Roman Málek (born September 25, 1977) is a former Czech professional ice hockey goaltender who played in the Czech Extraliga, Russian Superleague, and Swedish Hockey League. He was selected by the Philadelphia Flyers in the 5th round (158th overall) of the 2001 NHL entry draft but did not play in America.

Málek played with HC Vítkovice in the Czech Extraliga during the 2010–11 season. He is now a Goalie Coach in Slavia Prague and runs Goalie Service Camps for young goalies.

He has recently build a training goalie net for his offsprings to practice during the coronavirus pandemic.
