= Malek (given name) =

Malek (in Arabic مالك) is a masculine Arabic given name. It also denotes king written (in Arabic ملك or Persian ملک). Notable people with the name include:

- Malek Ashraf (died 1357), a Chupanid ruler of northwestern Iran during the 14th century
- Malek Awab, Singaporean footballer
- Malek Bennabi (1905–1973), Algerian writer and philosopher
- Malek Boutih (born 1964), French politician and activist
- Malek Chergui (born 1988), French footballer of Algerian descent
- Malek Jandali (born 1972), German-born Syrian-American pianist and composer
- Malek Jaziri (born 1984), Tunisian tennis player
- Malek Koussa (born 1971), Syrian footballer
- Malek Maktabi, also known as Malik Maktaby, Lebanese television presenter
- Malek ِAlolayan (born 1981), Saudi Arabian footballer
- Malek the Paladin, leader of the Sarafan sorcerer-priests and antagonist in Blood Omen: Legacy of Kain

== See also ==
- Malek (surname)
